= Asian Players Tour Championship 2012/2013 – Event 1 =

Asian Players Tour Championship 2012/2013 Event 1

Tournament information
- Dates: 18–22 June 2012
- Venue: Zhangjiagang Sports Center
- City: Zhangjiagang
- Country: China
- Organisation: World Snooker
- Format: Minor-ranking event
- Total prize fund: £50,000
- Winner's share: £10,000
- Highest break: Cai Jianzhong (CHN) (127)

Final
- Champion: Stuart Bingham (ENG)
- Runner-up: Stephen Lee (ENG)
- Score: 4–3

The Guotai Liquor Asian Players Tour Championship 2012/2013 – Event 1 was a professional minor-ranking snooker tournament that took place between 18 and 22 June 2012 at the Zhangjiagang Sports Center in Zhangjiagang, China.

Stuart Bingham won his sixth professional title by defeating Stephen Lee 4–3 in the final. This win has also guaranteed Bingham a place in this season's PTC Finals.

== Prize fund and ranking points ==
The breakdown of prize money and ranking points of the event is shown below:

| | Prize fund | Ranking points^{1} |
|---|---|---|
| Winner | £10,000 | 2,000 |
| Runner-up | £5,000 | 1,600 |
| Semi-finalist | £2,500 | 1,280 |
| Quarter-finalist | £1,500 | 1,000 |
| Last 16 | £1,000 | 760 |
| Last 32 | £600 | 560 |
| Last 64 | £200 | 360 |
| Total | £50,000 | – |

- ^{1} Only professional players can earn ranking points.

== Main draw ==
=== Wildcard round ===
Best of 7 frames

| (China) Zhou Yuelong | 4–1 | (China) Zheng Peng |
| (China) Chen Zifan | 4–2 | (China) Luo Guangsheng |
| (China) Lu Ning | 4–3 | (China) Chen Bo |
| (China) Zhang Yang | 4–1 | (China) Mu Gang |
| (Hong Kong) Lin Tang Ho Alan | 0–4 | (China) Zhu Yinghui |
| (China) Sun Chang | 2–4 | (China) Yang Qingtian |
| (China) Lin Shuai | 4–0 | (Hong Kong) Yin Lun Cheng |
| (Hong Kong) Chan Ka Kin | 0–4 | (China) A Bulajiang |
| (China) Zhang Dongtao | w/o–w/d | (China) Li Yinxi |

| (China) Shi Hanqing | 4–1 | (China) Zhang Yadong |
| (Malaysia) Fang Yuanjun | 1–4 | (China) Zhao Xintong |
| (China) Zhang Yong | 1–4 | (Hong Kong) Fung Kwok Wai |
| (China) Zhang Yi | 4–2 | (Hong Kong) Au Chi-wai |
| (China) Xu Xinjian | 4–2 | (China) Ma Tingpeng |
| (China) Lyu Haotian | 4–1 | (China) Qiu Yalong |
| (China) Wang Yuchen | w/o–w/d | (South Korea) Hwang Chulho |
| (China) Lei Zhen | 1–4 | (China) Cao Kaisheng |

=== Main rounds ===
==== Top half ====
===== Section 1 =====
Last 64; Best of 7 frames
(Wales) Mark Williams | 4
(China) Zhou Yuelong | 1
(China) Cai Jianzhong | 4
(China) Tang Xu | 0
(Wales) Michael White | 4
(China) Chen Zifan | 2
(China) Lu Ning | 4
(England) Matthew Selt | 2
(Scotland) Marcus Campbell | 2
(China) Zhang Yang | 4
(China) Li Yuan | 4
(Australia) Ben Judge | 1
(China) Zhang Anda | 4
(China) Chen Ruifu | 1
(China) Zhu Yinghui | 4
(Wales) Dominic Dale | 3

Last 32; Best of 7 frames
(Wales) Mark Williams | 4
(China) Cai Jianzhong | 3
(Wales) Michael White | 4
(China) Lu Ning | 3
(China) Zhang Yang | 1
(China) Li Yuan | 4
(China) Zhang Anda | 4
(China) Zhu Yinghui | 2

Last 16; Best of 7 frames
(Wales) Mark Williams | 1
(Wales) Michael White | 4
(China) Li Yuan | 1
(China) Zhang Anda | 4

Quarter-finals; Best of 7 frames
(Wales) Michael White | 4
(China) Zhang Anda | 3

===== Section 2 =====
Last 64; Best of 7 frames
(England) Stuart Bingham | 4
(China) Yang Qingtian | 3
(China) Qi Ya | 0
(China) Jin Long | 4
(China) Li Yan | 4
(China) Cui Ming | 0
(China) Lin Shuai | 4
(England) Mark King | 3
(England) Robert Milkins | 4
(China) A Bulajiang | 0
(China) Lu Zhenwei | 4
(England) Alfie Burden | 3
(China) Rouzi Maimaiti | 4
(China) Da Hailin | 2
(China) Zhang Dongtao | 2
(China) Ding Junhui | 4

Last 32; Best of 7 frames
(England) Stuart Bingham | 4
(China) Jin Long | 1
(China) Li Yan | 3
(China) Lin Shuai | 4
(England) Robert Milkins | 4
(China) Lu Zhenwei | 0
(China) Rouzi Maimaiti | 0
(China) Ding Junhui | 4

Last 16; Best of 7 frames
(England) Stuart Bingham | 4
(China) Lin Shuai | 0
(England) Robert Milkins | 3
(China) Ding Junhui | 4

Quarter-finals; Best of 7 frames
(England) Stuart Bingham | 4
(China) Ding Junhui | 3

==== Bottom half ====
===== Section 3 =====
Last 64; Best of 7 frames
(England) Stephen Lee | 4
(China) Shi Hanqing | 1
(China) Lin Yongzhi | 4
(China) Chen Feilong | 2
(China) Yu Delu | 4
(China) Pa Ruke | 2
(China) Zhao Xintong | 4
(China) Xiao Guodong | 0
(Hong Kong) Marco Fu | 4
(Hong Kong) Fung Kwok Wai | 1
(China) Ma Bing | 3
(China) Tian Pengfei | 4
(England) Michael Wasley | w/d
(China) Mei Xiwen | w/o
(China) Zhang Yi | 1
(England) Mark Davis | 4

Last 32; Best of 7 frames
(England) Stephen Lee | 4
(China) Lin Yongzhi | 0
(China) Yu Delu | 1
(China) Zhao Xintong | 4
(Hong Kong) Marco Fu | 1
(China) Tian Pengfei | 4
(China) Mei Xiwen | 4
(England) Mark Davis | 3

Last 16; Best of 7 frames
(England) Stephen Lee | 4
(China) Zhao Xintong | 3
(China) Tian Pengfei | 4
(China) Mei Xiwen | 1

Quarter-finals; Best of 7 frames
(England) Stephen Lee | 4
(China) Tian Pengfei | 2

===== Section 4 =====
Last 64; Best of 7 frames
(England) Peter Ebdon | 3
(China) Xu Xinjian | 4
(China) Guan Zhen | 1
(China) Chen Zhe | 4
(China) Cao Yupeng | 2
(China) Wang Linhan | 4
(China) Lyu Haotian | 3
(England) Tom Ford | 4
(England) Ben Woollaston | 4
(China) Wang Yuchen | 0
(China) Pan Weixing | 4
(China) Liu Chuang | 3
(China) Li Hang | 1
(China) Cao Xinlong | 4
(China) Cao Kaisheng | 4
(Scotland) Stephen Maguire | 0

Last 32; Best of 7 frames
(China) Xu Xinjian | 0
(China) Chen Zhe | 4
(China) Wang Linhan | 3
(England) Tom Ford | 4
(England) Ben Woollaston | 4
(China) Pan Weixing | 0
(China) Cao Xinlong | 2
(China) Cao Kaisheng | 4

Last 16; Best of 7 frames
(China) Chen Zhe | 4
(England) Tom Ford | 3
(England) Ben Woollaston | 4
(China) Cao Kaisheng | 2

Quarter-finals; Best of 7 frames
(China) Chen Zhe | 4
(England) Ben Woollaston | 0

==== Finals ====
| Quarter-finals; Best of 7 frames | | Semi-finals; Best of 7 frames | | Final; Best of 7 frames |
| (Wales) Michael White | 4 |
| (China) Zhang Anda | 3 | (Wales) Michael White | 2 |
| (England) Stuart Bingham | 4 | (England) Stuart Bingham | 4 |
| (China) Ding Junhui | 3 | | | (England) Stuart Bingham | 4 |
| (England) Stephen Lee | 4 | | | (England) Stephen Lee | 3 |
| (China) Tian Pengfei | 2 | (England) Stephen Lee | 4 |
| (China) Chen Zhe | 4 | (China) Chen Zhe | 2 |
| (England) Ben Woollaston | 0 |

== Century breaks ==
- 127 – Cai Jianzhong
- 119 – Mark Williams
- 117, 112, 104 – Stuart Bingham
- 116 – Dominic Dale
- 114 – Tom Ford
- 112, 100 – Stephen Lee
- 109, 105, 100 – Michael White
- 107 – Robert Milkins
- 102 – Chen Zhe
- 102 – Ding Junhui
