= 2010 Wuxi Classic =

Rundili Wuxi Classic

Tournament information
- Dates: 3–6 June 2010
- Venue: Wuxi Sports Center
- City: Wuxi
- Country: China
- Organisation: WPBSA
- Format: Non-ranking event
- Highest break: 134

Final
- Champion: (England) Shaun Murphy
- Runner-up: (China) Ding Junhui
- Score: 9–8

The 2010 Rundili Wuxi Classic was a professional non-ranking snooker tournament held between 3–6 June 2010 at the Wuxi Sports Center in Wuxi, China. The event was known as Jiangsu Classic in 2009.

Mark Allen was the defending champion, but he lost 1–6 in the semi-finals against Shaun Murphy. Murphy then won in the final 9–8 against Ding Junhui, winning the last seven frames from 2–8 down.

== Main draw ==
Last 12; Best of 9 frames
(Hong Kong) Marco Fu | 5
(China) Liang Wenbo | 2
(Scotland) Stephen Hendry | 5
(China) Xiao Guodong | 3
(Wales) Ryan Day | 5
(China) Yu Delu | 4
(England) Mark Selby | 3
(China) Tian Pengfei | 5

Quarter-finals; Best of 9 frames
(Northern Ireland) Mark Allen | 5
(Hong Kong) Marco Fu | 3
(England) Shaun Murphy | 5
(Scotland) Stephen Hendry | 1
(China) Ding Junhui | 5
(Wales) Ryan Day | 2
(England) Joe Perry | 1
(China) Tian Pengfei | 5

Semi-finals; Best of 11 frames
(Northern Ireland) Mark Allen | 1
(England) Shaun Murphy | 6
(China) Ding Junhui | 6
(China) Tian Pengfei | 0

Final; Best of 17 frames
(England) Shaun Murphy | 9
(China) Ding Junhui | 8

== Final ==
Final: Best of 17 frames Wuxi City Sports Park Stadium, Wuxi, China, 6 June 2010.
| Shaun Murphy; England | 9–8 | Ding Junhui; China |
Afternoon: 5–89 (63), 39–88, 18–62, 64–37, 16–108 (67), 43–76 (62), 101–1 (101), 17–86; Evening: 38–81, 0–91 (75), 91–6 (78), 82–0, 92–0 (92), 63–8 (59), 72–18 (58), 96–0 (96), 86–0 (86)
| 101 | Highest break | 75 |
| 1 | Century breaks | 0 |
| 7 | 50+ breaks | 4 |

== Century breaks ==
- 134, 131 – Marco Fu
- 129 – Mark Selby
- 125, 113, 101, 100 – Shaun Murphy
- 108 – Ding Junhui
