= Asian Players Tour Championship 2012/2013 – Event 3 =

Asian Players Tour Championship 2012/2013 Event 3

Tournament information
- Dates: 5–9 November 2012
- Venue: Henan Province Sports Stadium
- City: Zhengzhou
- Country: China
- Organisation: World Snooker
- Format: Minor-ranking event
- Total prize fund: £50,000
- Winner's share: £10,000
- Highest break: Yu Delu (CHN) (140)

Final
- Champion: Stuart Bingham (ENG)
- Runner-up: Li Hang (CHN)
- Score: 4–3

The Guotai Liquor Asian Players Tour Championship 2012/2013 – Event 3 was a professional minor-ranking snooker tournament that took place between 5–9 November 2012 at the Henan Province Sports Stadium in Zhengzhou, China.

Stuart Bingham won his seventh professional title by defeating Li Hang 4–3 in the final.

== Prize fund and ranking points ==
The breakdown of prize money and ranking points of the event is shown below:

	Prize fund	Ranking points^{1}
Winner	£10,000	2,000
Runner-up	£5,000	1,600
Semi-finalist	£2,500	1,280
Quarter-finalist	£1,500	1,000
Last 16	£1,000	760
Last 32	£600	560
Last 64	£200	360
Total	£50,000	–

- ^{1} Only professional players can earn ranking points.

== Main draw ==
=== Top half ===
==== Section 1 ====
Last 128; Best of 7 frames
(China) Huang Jiahao	4
(China) Zou Jinhai	3
(China) Sun Hongrui	2
(China) Zhang Yang	4
(China) Zhang Dongtao	4
(Hong Kong) Chou Hon Man	0
(China) Ma Bing	4
(Hong Kong) Lau Ka Lam	0

Last 64; Best of 7 frames
(England) Stuart Bingham	4
(China) Huang Jiahao	1
(England) Michael Holt	4
(China) Wang Linhan	1
(China) Zhang Yang	4
(China) Zhang Dongtao	2
(China) Ma Bing	3
(China) Li Yan	4

Last 32; Best of 7 frames
(England) Stuart Bingham	4
(England) Michael Holt	2
(China) Zhang Yang	1
(China) Li Yan	4

Last 16; Best of 7 frames
(England) Stuart Bingham	4
(China) Li Yan	1

==== Section 2 ====
Last 128; Best of 7 frames
(Republic of Ireland) Ken Doherty	4
(China) Liu Ren	1
(China) Zhang Yadong	4
(China) Pa Ruke	1

Last 64; Best of 7 frames
(Republic of Ireland) Ken Doherty	4
(China) Tang Jun	2
(Hong Kong) Marco Fu	4
(China) Li Yuan	1
(China) Shi Hanqing	4
(China) Lin Yongzhi	2
(China) Lyu Haotian	4
(China) Zhang Yadong	3

Last 32; Best of 7 frames
(Republic of Ireland) Ken Doherty	4
(Hong Kong) Marco Fu	3
(China) Shi Hanqing	4
(China) Lyu Haotian	2

Last 16; Best of 7 frames
(Republic of Ireland) Ken Doherty	4
(China) Shi Hanqing	0

==== Section 3 ====
Last 128; Best of 7 frames
(China) Tian Jiaqi	3
(China) Zhang Yong	4
(China) Li Yingdong	1
(China) Yu Xuantang	4

Last 64; Best of 7 frames
(Australia) Ben Judge	0
(Wales) Matthew Stevens	4
(China) Zhang Yong	4
(China) Yu Xuantang	3
(China) Tian Pengfei	1
(China) Mei Xiwen	4
(England) Tom Ford	4
(China) Cui Ming	3

Last 32; Best of 7 frames
(Wales) Matthew Stevens	0
(China) Zhang Yong	4
(China) Mei Xiwen	3
(England) Tom Ford	4

Last 16; Best of 7 frames
(China) Zhang Yong	1
(England) Tom Ford	4

==== Section 4 ====
Last 128; Best of 7 frames
(China) Wang Lige	4
(China) Wang Yuchen	2
(China) Hu Hao	4
(China) Yang Qingtian	2

Last 64; Best of 7 frames
(China) Wang Lige	0
(China) Hu Hao	4
(Wales) Daniel Wells	2
(China) Zhu Yinghui	4
(England) Mark King	3
(England) Ricky Walden	4
(China) Xiao Guodong	4
(China) Rouzi Maimaiti	0

Last 32; Best of 7 frames
(China) Hu Hao	4
(China) Zhu Yinghui	1
(England) Ricky Walden	1
(China) Xiao Guodong	4

Last 16; Best of 7 frames
(China) Hu Hao	4
(China) Xiao Guodong	2

=== Bottom half ===
==== Section 5 ====
Last 128; Best of 7 frames
(China) Lei Zhen	1
(China) Ma Tingpeng	4
(China) Li Yujin	0
(China) Fang Xiongman	4
(Wales) Ryan Day	4
(Hong Kong) Chan Ka Kin	2

Last 64; Best of 7 frames
(China) Chen Zhe	1
(China) Ma Tingpeng	4
(China) Fang Xiongman	2
(China) Zhang Anda	4
(China) Lu Ning	2
(China) Guan Zhen	4
(Wales) Ryan Day	3
(China) Yu Delu	4

Last 32; Best of 7 frames
(China) Ma Tingpeng	2
(China) Zhang Anda	4
(China) Guan Zhen	2
(China) Yu Delu	4

Last 16; Best of 7 frames
(China) Zhang Anda	4
(China) Yu Delu	3

==== Section 6 ====
Last 128; Best of 7 frames
(England) Barry Pinches	4
(England) Ben Harrison	1
(China) Ju Reti	4
(China) Geng Mingqi	1
(China) Zhao Xintong	4
(China) Wang Jun	0
(China) Xiong Jun	1
(China) Ji Zhijun	4
(Hong Kong) Fung Kwok Wai	4
(China) Liu Jiaming	0

Last 64; Best of 7 frames
(England) Barry Pinches	0
(China) Ju Reti	4
(China) Zhao Xintong	1
(China) Zhou Yuelong	4
(China) Ji Zhijun	2
(Hong Kong) Fung Kwok Wai	4
(China) Li Hang	4
(China) Chen Feilong	1

Last 32; Best of 7 frames
(China) Ju Reti	4
(China) Zhou Yuelong	1
(Hong Kong) Fung Kwok Wai	2
(China) Li Hang	4

Last 16; Best of 7 frames
(China) Ju Reti	2
(China) Li Hang	4

==== Section 7 ====
Last 128; Best of 7 frames
(England) Andrew Higginson	4
(China) Niu Zhuang	1

Last 64; Best of 7 frames
(China) Liu Chuang	4
(China) Lu Chenwei	1
(England) Andrew Higginson	2
(England) Robert Milkins	4
(China) Chen Ruifu	4
(China) Jin Long	1
(China) Cai Jianzhong	4
(China) Pan Weixing	1

Last 32; Best of 7 frames
(China) Liu Chuang	0
(England) Robert Milkins	4
(China) Chen Ruifu	4
(China) Cai Jianzhong	0

Last 16; Best of 7 frames
(England) Robert Milkins	4
(China) Chen Ruifu	3

==== Section 8 ====
Last 128; Best of 7 frames
(England) Jimmy White	2
(China) Lin Shuai	4
(China) Yao Pengcheng	2
(China) Wang Zepeng	4

Last 64; Best of 7 frames
(China) Cao Yupeng	4
(China) Da Hailin	0
(China) Lin Shuai	3
(China) Xu Xinjian	4
(Wales) Dominic Dale	1
(China) Cao Xinlong	4
(China) Wang Zepeng	0
(China) Ding Junhui	4

Last 32; Best of 7 frames
(China) Cao Yupeng	4
(China) Xu Xinjian	0
(China) Cao Xinlong	4
(China) Ding Junhui	3

Last 16; Best of 7 frames
(China) Cao Yupeng	4
(China) Cao Xinlong	2

=== Finals ===
Quarter-finals; Best of 7 frames		Semi-finals; Best of 7 frames		Final; Best of 7 frames
(England) Stuart Bingham	4
(Republic of Ireland) Ken Doherty	1	(England) Stuart Bingham	4
(England) Tom Ford	4	(England) Tom Ford	3
(China) Hu Hao	1			(England) Stuart Bingham	4
(China) Zhang Anda	2			(China) Li Hang	3
(China) Li Hang	4	(China) Li Hang	4
(England) Robert Milkins	4	(England) Robert Milkins	1
(China) Cao Yupeng	0

== Century breaks ==
- 140 – Yu Delu
- 139 – Zhang Anda
- 124, 122, 112 – Tom Ford
- 122 – Lyu Haotian
- 120 – Chen Ruifu
- 112 – Ding Junhui
- 111 – Cao Yupeng
- 108 – Cao Xinlong
- 105 – Michael Holt
- 104 – Zhang Yang
- 104 – Andrew Higginson
- 104 – Stuart Bingham
- 102 – Ken Doherty
- 100 – Robert Milkins
