= 2013 Wuxi Classic =

Sports Lottery Cup Wuxi Classic
Tournament information
- Dates: 17–23 June 2013
- Venue: Wuxi City Sports Park Stadium
- City: Wuxi
- Country: China
- Organisation: World Snooker
- Format: Ranking event
- Total prize fund: £470,000
- Winner's share: £80,000
- Highest break: 138 (x2)

Final
- Champion: Neil Robertson (AUS)
- Runner-up: John Higgins (SCO)
- Score: 10–7

The 2013 Sports Lottery Cup Wuxi Classic was a professional ranking snooker tournament held between 17 and 23 June 2013 at the Wuxi City Sports Park Stadium in Wuxi, China. It was the first ranking event of the 2013/2014 season.

The tournament was the first to use the new format, similar to the one used in the minor-ranking Players Tour Championship events, where every player, including members of the top 16, started in the first round. Some of the sport's biggest names did not reach the tournament's final stage. Reigning world champion Ronnie O'Sullivan withdrew for personal reasons shortly before his qualifying match against Michael Wasley. World number one Mark Selby lost his qualifying match 3–5 to Andrew Pagett. World number four Shaun Murphy also exited the tournament at the qualifying stage, losing 1–5 to Alex Davies.

Nine-time women's world champion Reanne Evans defeated Thailand's Thepchaiya Un-Nooh 5–4 in her qualifying match to become the first woman ever to reach the final stages of a major professional ranking tournament. Evans was chosen as one of four players to play against local opponents in the wildcard round, and she lost 2–5 against Chinese teenager Zhu Yinghui.

Ricky Walden was the defending champion, but he lost 2–5 against Jimmy White in the last 64.

Neil Robertson won his eighth ranking title by defeating John Higgins 10–7 in the final. Robertson also made the 98th official maximum break during his qualifying match against Mohamed Khairy. This was Robertson's second 147 break and the first in the 2013/2014 season.

== Prize fund ==
The total prize money of the event was raised to £470,000 from the previous year's £400,000. This is £45,000 more than what was announced in 2012. The breakdown of prize money for this year is shown below:

- Winner: £80,000
- Runner-up: £35,000
- Semi-final: £20,000
- Quarter-final: £11,500
- Last 16: £8,000
- Last 32: £6,500
- Last 64: £3,000
- Non-televised highest break: £0
- Televised highest break: £2,000
- Non-televised maximum break: £3,000
- Total: £470,000

== Wildcard round ==
These matches were played in Wuxi on 17 June 2013.

| Match | | Score | |
|---|---|---|---|
| WC1 | Jimmy Robertson (ENG) | 5–4 | Zhou Yuelong (CHN) |
| WC2 | Reanne Evans (ENG) | 2–5 | Zhu Yinghui (CHN) |
| WC3 | Vinnie Calabrese (AUS) | 5–4 | Zhao Xintong (CHN) |
| WC4 | Adam Duffy (ENG) | 3–5 | Lu Ning (CHN) |

== Main draw ==
=== Top half ===
Last 64; Best of 9 frames
(England) Ricky Walden | 2
(England) Jimmy White | 5
(England) John Astley | 0
(England) Robert Milkins | 5
(Scotland) Scott Donaldson | 5
(England) Gareth Green | 3
(England) Jimmy Robertson | 5
(Scotland) Graeme Dott | 0
(Wales) Mark Williams | 5
(England) Liam Highfield | 4
(China) Tian Pengfei | 0
(England) Jack Lisowski | 5
(Wales) Ryan Day | 2
(England) Anthony Hamilton | 5
(China) Yu Delu | 2
(England) Stuart Bingham | 5
(England) Alex Davies | 2
(England) Joel Walker | 5
(China) Chen Zhe | 2
(England) Ben Woollaston | 5
(Wales) Michael White | 3
(China) Cao Yupeng | 5
(Republic of Ireland) Fergal O'Brien | 3
(England) Barry Hawkins | 5
(Hong Kong) Marco Fu | 5
(England) Nigel Bond | 2
(England) Rory McLeod | 3
(England) Mark King | 5
(England) Martin Gould | 5
(Norway) Kurt Maflin | 3
(China) Zhu Yinghui | 2
(Australia) Neil Robertson | 5

Last 32; Best of 9 frames
(England) Jimmy White | 3
(England) Robert Milkins | 5
(Scotland) Scott Donaldson | 5
(England) Jimmy Robertson | 4
(Wales) Mark Williams | 5
(England) Jack Lisowski | 4
(England) Anthony Hamilton | 5
(England) Stuart Bingham | 2
(England) Joel Walker | 2
(England) Ben Woollaston | 5
(China) Cao Yupeng | 5
(England) Barry Hawkins | 4
(Hong Kong) Marco Fu | 4
(England) Mark King | 5
(England) Martin Gould | 2
(Australia) Neil Robertson | 5

Last 16; Best of 9 frames
(England) Robert Milkins | 5
(Scotland) Scott Donaldson | 1
(Wales) Mark Williams | 3
(England) Anthony Hamilton | 5
(England) Ben Woollaston | 3
(China) Cao Yupeng | 5
(England) Mark King | 0
(Australia) Neil Robertson | 5

Quarter-finals; Best of 9 frames
(England) Robert Milkins | 5
(England) Anthony Hamilton | 3
(China) Cao Yupeng | 4
(Australia) Neil Robertson | 5

Semi-finals; Best of 11 frames
(England) Robert Milkins | 2
(Australia) Neil Robertson | 6

=== Bottom half ===
Last 64; Best of 9 frames
(Wales) Andrew Pagett | 2
(England) David Gilbert | 5
(Scotland) Alan McManus | 5
(Republic of Ireland) Ken Doherty | 3
(England) Joe Perry | 5
(England) Jamie Cope | 2
(Scotland) Jamie Burnett | 3
(China) Ding Junhui | 5
(Scotland) John Higgins | 5
(Australia) Vinnie Calabrese | 1
(Thailand) Dechawat Poomjaeng | 5
(Wales) Dominic Dale | 1
(England) Peter Ebdon | 3
(China) Xiao Guodong | 5
(China) Li Hang | 5
(England) Judd Trump | 2
(Northern Ireland) Mark Allen | 4
(England) Peter Lines | 5
(England) Steve Davis | 1
(England) Andrew Higginson | 5
(China) Liang Wenbo | 5
(Wales) Jamie Jones | 4
(China) Lu Ning | 1
(Wales) Matthew Stevens | 5
(England) Ali Carter | 5
(England) Alfie Burden | 2
(China) Lyu Haotian | 5
(England) Craig Steadman | 3
(Republic of Ireland) David Morris | 5
(England) Gary Wilson | 4
(Northern Ireland) Gerard Greene | 5
(England) Michael Wasley | 1

Last 32; Best of 9 frames
(England) David Gilbert | 5
(Scotland) Alan McManus | 2
(England) Joe Perry | 5
(China) Ding Junhui | 1
(Scotland) John Higgins | 5
(Thailand) Dechawat Poomjaeng | 1
(China) Xiao Guodong | 5
(China) Li Hang | 4
(England) Peter Lines | 5
(England) Andrew Higginson | 2
(China) Liang Wenbo | 3
(Wales) Matthew Stevens | 5
(England) Ali Carter | 5
(China) Lyu Haotian | 0
(Republic of Ireland) David Morris | 5
(Northern Ireland) Gerard Greene | 2

Last 16; Best of 9 frames
(England) David Gilbert | 2
(England) Joe Perry | 5
(Scotland) John Higgins | 5
(China) Xiao Guodong | 0
(England) Peter Lines | 3
(Wales) Matthew Stevens | 5
(England) Ali Carter | 4
(Republic of Ireland) David Morris | 5

Quarter-finals; Best of 9 frames
(England) Joe Perry | 2
(Scotland) John Higgins | 5
(Wales) Matthew Stevens | 5
(Republic of Ireland) David Morris | 2

Semi-finals; Best of 11 frames
(Scotland) John Higgins | 6
(Wales) Matthew Stevens | 2

== Final ==
Final: Best of 19 frames. Referee: Michaela Tabb. Wuxi City Sports Park Stadium, Wuxi, China, 23 June 2013.
| Neil Robertson; Australia | 10–7 | John Higgins; Scotland |
Afternoon: 80–6 (61), 0–78 (78), 31–83 (56), 99–0 (91), 32–78 (70), 1–111 (93), 16–82 (82), 72–0 (52), 118–6 (113); Evening: 91–0, 106–6 (57), 66–52, 83–0 (59), 1–67 (66), 71–9, 53–66, 97–0 (65)
| 113 | Highest break | 93 |
| 1 | Century breaks | 0 |
| 7 | 50+ breaks | 6 |

== Qualifying ==
These matches were held between 27 and 29 May 2013 at The Capital Venue in Gloucester, England. All matches were best of 9 frames.

| (England) Ricky Walden | 5–4 | (India) Pankaj Advani |
| (England) Jimmy White | 5–3 | (England) Lee Page |
| (England) Mike Dunn | 2–5 | (England) John Astley |
| (England) Robert Milkins | 5–3 | (England) Robbie Williams |
| (England) Tom Ford | 1–5 | (Scotland) Scott Donaldson |
| (China) Liu Chuang | 4–5 | (England) Gareth Green |
| (England) Jimmy Robertson | 5–1 | (England) Ryan Clark |
| (Scotland) Graeme Dott | 5–1 | (England) Christopher Keogan |
| (Wales) Mark Williams | 5–1 | (Scotland) Ross Muir |
| (England) Barry Pinches | 2–5 | (England) Liam Highfield |
| (China) Tian Pengfei | 5–3 | (Belgium) Luca Brecel |
| (England) Jack Lisowski | 5–1 | (England) Hammad Miah |
| (Wales) Ryan Day | 5–4 | (Thailand) Noppon Saengkham |
| (England) Anthony Hamilton | 5–3 | (England) Jamie O'Neill |
| (China) Yu Delu | 5–4 | (England) Sanderson Lam |
| (England) Stuart Bingham | 5–3 | (China) Li Yan |
| (England) Shaun Murphy | 1–5 | (England) Alex Davies |
| (England) Ian Burns | 2–5 | (England) Joel Walker |
| (England) Matthew Selt | 3–5 | (China) Chen Zhe |
| (England) Ben Woollaston | 5–1 | (England) Dylan Mitchell |
| (Wales) Michael White | 5–1 | (England) Sam Baird |
| (China) Cao Yupeng | 5–1 | (England) Paul Davison |
| (Republic of Ireland) Fergal O'Brien | 5–3 | (England) Ben Harrison |
| (England) Barry Hawkins | 5–1 | (England) Simon Bedford |
| (Hong Kong) Marco Fu | 5–1 | (Wales) Daniel Wells |
| (England) Nigel Bond | 5–3 | (England) Chris Norbury |
| (England) Rory McLeod | 5–0 | (England) Sean O'Sullivan |
| (England) Mark King | 5–1 | (England) Allan Taylor |
| (England) Martin Gould | 5–4 | (England) Ashley Carty |
| (Norway) Kurt Maflin | 5–3 | (Thailand) Thanawat Thirapongpaiboon |
| (Thailand) Thepchaiya Un-Nooh | 4–5 | (England) Reanne Evans |
| (Australia) Neil Robertson | 5–0 | (Egypt) Mohamed Khairy |

| (England) Mark Selby | 3–5 | (Wales) Andrew Pagett |
| (England) David Gilbert | 5–3 | (Wales) Jak Jones |
| (Scotland) Alan McManus | 5–3 | (Isle of Man) Darryl Hill |
| (Republic of Ireland) Ken Doherty | 5–2 | (Northern Ireland) Joe Swail |
| (England) Joe Perry | 5–1 | (England) Kyren Wilson |
| (England) Jamie Cope | 5–1 | (China) Zhang Anda |
| (Scotland) Jamie Burnett | 5–1 | (Wales) Andrew Rogers |
| (China) Ding Junhui | 5–4 | (India) Aditya Mehta |
| (Scotland) John Higgins | 5–2 | (England) Adam Wicheard |
| (Scotland) Anthony McGill | 3–5 | (Australia) Vinnie Calabrese |
| (Thailand) Dechawat Poomjaeng | 5–1 | (England) Darren Cook |
| (Wales) Dominic Dale | 5–1 | (England) Mitchell Travis |
| (England) Peter Ebdon | 5–1 | (England) Chris Wakelin |
| (China) Xiao Guodong | 5–3 | (England) Andrew Norman |
| (England) Mark Joyce | 3–5 | (China) Li Hang |
| (England) Judd Trump | 5–0 | (England) Phil O'Kane |
| (Northern Ireland) Mark Allen | 5–3 | (Scotland) Michael Leslie |
| (England) Peter Lines | 5–3 | (England) Sydney Wilson |
| (England) Steve Davis | 5–2 | (England) James Cahill |
| (England) Andrew Higginson | 5–3 | (Germany) Patrick Einsle |
| (China) Liang Wenbo | 5–2 | (Scotland) Fraser Patrick |
| (Wales) Jamie Jones | 5–3 | (England) David Grace |
| (England) Adam Duffy | 5–2 | (Malta) Tony Drago |
| (Wales) Matthew Stevens | 5–3 | (England) Zak Surety |
| (England) Ali Carter | 5–3 | (England) Elliot Slessor |
| (England) Alfie Burden | 5–3 | (England) Stuart Carrington |
| (England) Rod Lawler | 2–5 | (China) Lyu Haotian |
| (Scotland) Marcus Campbell | 3–5 | (England) Craig Steadman |
| (England) Michael Holt | 3–5 | (Republic of Ireland) David Morris |
| (Thailand) James Wattana | 2–5 | (England) Gary Wilson |
| (Northern Ireland) Gerard Greene | 5–3 | (England) Martin O'Donnell |
| (England) Ronnie O'Sullivan | w/d–w/o | (England) Michael Wasley |

== Century breaks ==
=== Qualifying stage centuries ===
- 147, 121 – Neil Robertson
- 139 – Tian Pengfei
- 135 – John Astley
- 135 – Lyu Haotian
- 133 – Dominic Dale
- 132 – Joe Perry
- 131 – Steve Davis
- 129, 109, 108 – Judd Trump
- 127 – Ricky Walden
- 121 – Stuart Bingham
- 116, 106 – Ding Junhui
- 116 – Kurt Maflin
- 115 – Martin Gould
- 112 – Anthony Hamilton
- 111, 108 – Mark Allen
- 111, 104 – Marco Fu
- 111 – Ben Woollaston
- 110 – Peter Lines
- 105 – Thepchaiya Un-Nooh
- 102 – Mark Williams
- 100 – Dechawat Poomjaeng
- 100 – Jamie Cope
- 100 – Gary Wilson

=== Televised stage centuries ===
- 138, 116, 101 – John Higgins
- 138, 103 – David Morris
- 127 – Anthony Hamilton
- 125 – Jimmy Robertson
- 122, 115 – Marco Fu
- 122, 102 – Cao Yupeng
- 120 – Robert Milkins
- 117, 104 – Fergal O'Brien
- 117 – Adam Duffy
- 115 – Lu Ning
- 113, 111 – Neil Robertson
- 106, 100, 100 – David Gilbert
- 105 – Stuart Bingham
- 104 – Matthew Stevens
- 104 – Mark Williams
- 102 – Scott Donaldson
- 100 – Jack Lisowski
- 100 – Peter Lines
