= 2008 Jiangsu Classic =

Guolian Securities Jiangsu Classic
Tournament information
- Dates: 4–8 June 2008
- Venue: Nanjing Olympic Sports Center Gymnasium; Wuxi Sports Center
- City: Nanjing; Wuxi
- Country: China
- Organisation: WPBSA
- Format: Non-ranking event
- Total prize fund: £64,000
- Winner's share: £20,000
- Highest break: 110

Final
- Champion: (China) Ding Junhui
- Runner-up: (England) Mark Selby
- Score: 6–5

The 2008 Guolian Securities Jiangsu Classic was a professional non-ranking snooker tournament that took place between 4 and 8 June 2008 in two cities in the Jiangsu Province, China.

The round-robin stage consisted of two groups of six players, eight top 16 players and four Chinese wild cards. The final was staged at the Wuxi Sports Center in Wuxi, while the rest of the tournament had been held at the Nanjing Olympic Sports Center Gymnasium in Nanjing.

Ding Junhui, the only player to have won all his matches, delighted his home crowd by taking the title with a tense final frame decider defeat of Mark Selby.

== Prize fund ==
The breakdown of prize money for this year is shown below:

- Winner: £20,000
- Runner-Up: £9,000
- Semi-final: £4,000
- 3rd place in group: £2,000
- 4th place in group: £1,000
- Appearance Fees for 8 professionals: £2,500
- Highest break: £1,000
- Total: £64,000

== Round-robin stage ==
=== Group A ===
POS	Player	MP	MW	FW	FL	FD	PTS
1	(England) Joe Perry	5	5	10	2	+8	5
2	(Wales) Ryan Day	5	4	8	4	+4	4
3	(China) Jin Long	5	2	6	6	0	2
4	(England) Shaun Murphy	5	2	5	7	−2	2
5	(China) Liang Wenbo	5	1	4	8	−4	1
6	(Australia) Neil Robertson	5	1	3	9	−6	1

(breaks above 50 shown between brackets), breaks 100 and above will be indicated bold.

- Shaun Murphy 2–0 Jin Long → (80) 137–0, (65) 107–0
- Neil Robertson 0–2 Liang Wenbo → 54–59, 3–115 (89)
- Ryan Day 0–2 Joe Perry → 43–65, 9–63 (62)
- Shaun Murphy 2–1 Liang Wenbo → 72–52, 1–85 (76), 69–18
- Ryan Day 2–1 Neil Robertson → 73–50, 30–68 (64), (59) 68–23
- Shaun Murphy 1–2 Neil Robertson → 7–81, 72-(52), 37–71
- Joe Perry 2–1 Jin Long → 72–23, 40–72, 77–40
- Ryan Day 2–1 Jin Long → 0-(86), (100)-0, (73) 77–0
- Joe Perry 2–1 Liang Wenbo → 40–76, 61–44, (77) 83–1
- Ryan Day 2–0 Liang Wenbo → (91) 92–28, (89)-20
- Shaun Murphy 0–2 Joe Perry → 44–64, ?-?
- Neil Robertson 0–2 Jin Long → 26–59 (59), 8–92
- Liang Wenbo 0–2 Jin Long → 40–80, 0–91 (62)
- Neil Robertson 0–2 Joe Perry → 6–94, 43–92 (81)
- Shaun Murphy 0–2 Ryan Day → 7–98 (62), 58–70

=== Group B ===
POS	Player	MP	MW	FW	FL	FD	PTS
1	(China) Ding Junhui	5	5	10	2	+8	5
2	(England) Mark Selby	5	3	7	6	+1	3
3	(England) Peter Ebdon	5	2	7	8	−1	2
4	(China) Liu Chuang	5	2	5	7	−2	2
5	(England) Ali Carter	5	2	5	8	−3	2
6	(China) Li Hang	5	1	5	8	−3	1

(breaks above 50 shown between brackets), breaks 100 and above will be indicated bold.

- Mark Selby 2–1 → Li Hang 57–7, 2–66 (64), (100) 119–4
- Peter Ebdon 1–2 Liu Chuang → (66) 79–25, (53)-55, 35–59
- Ali Carter 0–2 Ding Junhui → 15–109 (108), 2–64
- Mark Selby 2–0 Liu Chuang → (102) 111–0, (86)-33
- Ali Carter 2–1 Peter Ebdon → (68) 69–0, 0–102 (93), 68–35
- Ding Junhui 2–1 Li Hang → (72)-0, 31–70 (54), 85–44
- Mark Selby 1–2 Peter Ebdon → 71–43, 16-(100), 20–82 (68)
- Ali Carter 0–2 Li Hang → 0–79 (75), 4–50
- Ding Junhui 2–0 Liu Chuang → (77) 78–11, 61–54
- Ali Carter 2–1 Liu Chuang → 68–52, 23–72, 62–55
- Mark Selby 0–2 Ding Junhui → 10-(110), 30–69
- Peter Ebdon 2–1 Li Hang → (60) 84–8, 35–73, 66–17
- Liu Chuang 2–0 Li Hang → 68–8, 65–18
- Peter Ebdon 1–2 Ding Junhui → 2–76, (59) 77–0, 66–68
- Mark Selby 2–1 Ali Carter → (62) 67–24, 0–124 (52,72), (72)-1

== Knock-out stages ==
Semi-finals; Best of 9 frames
(England) Joe Perry	1
(England) Mark Selby*	4
(China) Ding Junhui**	4
(Wales) Ryan Day	0

Final; Best of 11 frames
(England) Mark Selby	5
(China) Ding Junhui	6

* 32–71, (51) 75–43, 1–75 (52), 1–81 (74), 22–97 (81)
** (52) 75–21, (81) 85–0, (75) 120–1, (108) 120–0

== Final ==
Final: Best of 11 frames. Wuxi City Sports Park Stadium, Wuxi, China, 8 June 2008.
Mark Selby; England	5–6	Ding Junhui; China
63–50, 52–60, 67–41, 36–76 (50), 24–68 (59), 38–77; 49–70 (70), 85–44 (64), 93–14 (85), 75–0 (74), 52–77 (52, 61)
85	Highest break	70
0	Century breaks	0
4	50+ breaks	4

== Century breaks ==
- 110, 108, 108 – Ding Junhui
- 102, 100 – Mark Selby
- 100 – Ryan Day
- 100 – Peter Ebdon
