= 2009 Jiangsu Classic =

Wuzhou International Group Jiangsu Classic
Tournament information
- Dates: 4–7 June 2009
- Venue: Wuxi Sports Center
- City: Wuxi
- Country: China
- Organisation: WPBSA
- Format: Non-ranking event
- Winner's share: £20,000
- Highest break: (England) Mark Selby (147)

Final
- Champion: (Northern Ireland) Mark Allen
- Runner-up: (China) Ding Junhui
- Score: 6–0

The 2009 Wuzhou International Group Jiangsu Classic was a professional non-ranking snooker tournament that took place between 4–7 June 2009 at the Wuxi Sports Center in Wuxi, China. The round-robin stage consisted of two groups of six players, ten top 16 players. The tournament was renamed the following year to Wuxi Classic.

Mark Selby made the 69th official maximum break during his last round robin match against Joe Perry. This was Selby's first official 147 break.

Mark Allen won his first professional title by defeating defending champion Ding Junhui 6–0.

== Prize fund ==
The breakdown of prize money for this year is shown below:

- Winner: £20,000
- Runner-Up: £9,000
- Semi-finalist: £8,000
- 3rd place in Group: £4,000
- 4th place in Group: £2,000
- Appearance Fees for professionals: £2,500
- Highest Break: £1,000

== Round robin stage ==
=== Group 1 ===
POS	Player	MP	MW	FW	FL	FD	PTS
1	(China) Ding Junhui	5	4	9	5	+4	4
2	(Northern Ireland) Mark Allen	5	3	7	4	+3	3
3	(Wales) Ryan Day	5	3	7	5	+2	3
4	(China) Li Hang	5	3	6	5	+1	3
5	(Scotland) Stephen Hendry	5	2	6	7	−1	2
6	(England) Peter Ebdon	5	0	3	10	−7	0

(breaks above 50 shown between brackets)
breaks 100 and above will be indicated bold.

- Ding Junhui 1–2 Li Hang → 29–47, (117) 118–12, 38–73 (65)
- Mark Allen 2–0 Stephen Hendry → (60) 77–40, 65–0
- Ryan Day 2–0 Peter Ebdon → (132)-0, (60) 66–51
- Ding Junhui 2–1 Stephen Hendry → 80–47, 32–71 (60), 64–43
- Ryan Day 2–0 Mark Allen → 53–52, 62–21
- Peter Ebdon 1–2 Li Hang → (55) 66–14, 44–68, 17–92
- Ding Junhui 2–1 Mark Allen → (52) 92–45, (53) 60–70, (78) 92–26
- Ryan Day 1–2 Li Hang → 69–13, 8-(77), 16-(62)
- Peter Ebdon 1–2 Stephen Hendry → 64–16, 9–73 (64), 28–66
- Ryan Day 2–1 Stephen Hendry → (68)-0, 14-(102), (76)-1
- Ding Junhui 2–1 Peter Ebdon → 49–70 (52), 70–46, 70–47
- Mark Allen 2–0 Li Hang → 79–44, (52) 68–49
- Stephen Hendry 2–0 Li Hang → 94–21, 71–7
- Mark Allen 2–0 Peter Ebdon → 78–73, 86–32
- Ding Junhui 2–0 Ryan Day → 65–16, 53–35

=== Group 2 ===
POS	Player	MP	MW	FW	FL	FD	PTS
1	(England) Shaun Murphy	5	4	8	3	+5	4*
2	(Hong Kong) Marco Fu	5	4	8	3	+5	4
3	(England) Joe Perry	5	3	7	6	+1	3
4	(England) Mark Selby	5	2	6	7	−1	2
5	(England) Ali Carter	5	2	5	8	−3	2
6	(China) Jin Long	5	0	3	10	−7	0

(breaks above 50 shown between brackets)
breaks 100 and above will be indicated bold.

- Shaun Murphy 2–0 Jin Long → 54–52, (114)-6
- Joe Perry 0–2 Marco Fu → 60–88, 13–74
- Ali Carter 0–2 Mark Selby → 33–70, 2–124 (92)
- Shaun Murphy 2–0 Marco Fu → 80–0, 72–0
- Ali Carter 2–1 Joe Perry → 0-(99), (56) 96–22, 45–38
- Mark Selby 2–1 Jin Long → 42–102, 68–41, 106–33
- Shaun Murphy 0–2 Joe Perry → 0-(74), 0–80
- Ali Carter 2–1 Jin Long → 1–80, (81) 85–15, 58–52
- Mark Selby 1–2 Marco Fu → 44–100 (58), 74–6, 6–60
- Ali Carter 0–2 Marco Fu → 29–55, 17–86 (81)
- Shaun Murphy 2–0 Mark Selby → 84–29, (52) 85–8
- Joe Perry 2–1 Jin Long → 28–61, 53–44, 64-(54)
- Marco Fu 2–0 Jin Long → (54) 69–29, 54–37
- Joe Perry 2–1 Mark Selby → 0–151 (147), 68–56, (74)-1
- Shaun Murphy 2–1 Ali Carter → 76–63, 26–82 (64), (85) 86–0

* Shaun Murphy topped the group ahead of Marco Fu due to winning their head to head match 2–0

== Knock-out stages ==
Semi-finals; Best of 9 frames
(China) Ding Junhui*	5
(Hong Kong) Marco Fu	1
(England) Shaun Murphy	2
(Northern Ireland) Mark Allen**	5

Final; Best of 11 frames
(China) Ding Junhui	0
(Northern Ireland) Mark Allen	6

* 76–51, 0–63, (104) 125–0, (124) 128–1, (97)-0, (72)-0
** 4–110 (86), 64–55, 25–66 (61), (74) 83–1, 16–78 (72), 4–124 (88), 47–76

== Final ==
Final: Best of 11 frames Wuxi Sports Center, Wuxi, China, 7 June 2009.
Ding Junhui; China	0–6	Mark Allen; Northern Ireland
0–105 (64), 8–81 (71), 19–102 (74), 41–63, 32–68, 14–67 (58)
37	Highest break	74
0	Century breaks	0
0	50+ breaks	4

== Century breaks ==
- 147 – Mark Selby
- 132 – Ryan Day
- 124, 117, 104 – Ding Junhui
- 114 – Shaun Murphy
- 102 – Stephen Hendry
