= Li Hang (snooker player) =

Chinese snooker player (born 1990)

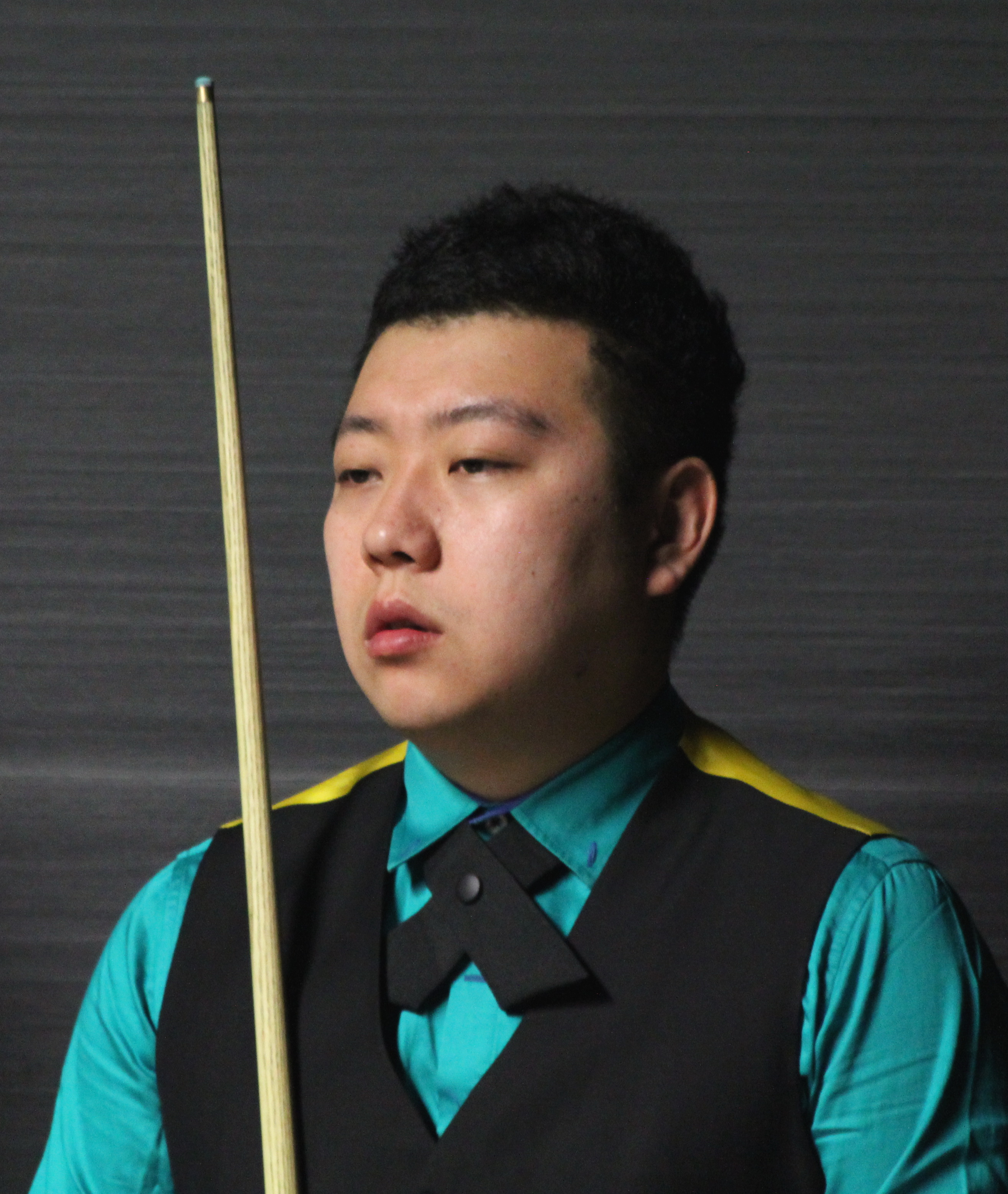
- Paul Hunter Classic 2016

Personal information
- Born: October 4, 1990 (age 36) Jinzhou, Liaoning, China

Sport
- Country: China
- Sport: Snooker
- Professional: 2008–2010, 2013–2023
- Highest ranking: 28 (April 2019)
- Century breaks: 111
- Best ranking finish: Semi-final (x2)

Li Hang (Chinese: 李行; pinyin: Lǐ Háng; born 4 October 1990) is a Chinese former professional snooker player who, in 2023, was permanently banned from the sport after committing a range of match-fixing offences. Li first competed professionally during the 2008–09 season. His best performances during his professional career were reaching two ranking semi-finals. He reached a career high of 28th in the snooker world rankings in 2019.

In December 2022, the WPBSA suspended Li from the professional tour amid a match-fixing investigation. In January 2023, it charged him with fixing a match, being concerned in fixing matches, approaching a player to fix a match, seeking to obstruct the investigation, and betting on snooker matches. Following an independent disciplinary tribunal, Li and compatriot Liang Wenbo were permanently banned from the sport, the only two lifetime bans ever handed down in professional snooker.

== Career ==
=== Early years ===
Li was entered into the wildcard round of the China Open as an amateur player for three consecutive years from 2006. He lost at this stage in 2006 and 2008, but in 2007 he beat Ian Preece 5–4 to reach the first round of a ranking event for the first time, where he lost 1–5 to 1997 world champion Ken Doherty. In April 2008, Li won the ACBS Asian Under-21 Snooker Championship with a 6–1 success over Li Yuan in the final. The title earned him a place on the 2008–09 snooker tour.

=== Professional debut ===
His first tournament as a professional was the 2008 Jiangsu Classic, where he finished last in his group, although he managed to beat the 2008 World Championship runner-up Ali Carter 2–0. In qualifying for the first ranking event of the year, the Northern Ireland Trophy, Li beat Robert Stephen 5–1 and David Morris 5–4 to reach the last qualifying round, where he was defeated 2–5 by Andrew Higginson. This was the closest he came to reaching the main stage of a tournament during the season, with it ending when Li lost 9–10 to Daniel Wells in the second round of World Championship qualifying. Li finished the year ranked world number 71.

=== 2009/2010 season ===
Li entered qualifying for five of the six ranking events during the 2009–10 season, losing in the first round in the UK Championship, China Open and World Championship. At the Grand Prix he saw off Brendan O'Donoghue and David Roe both by last frame deciders, before losing 3–5 to Mark Davis. Li enjoyed his best run in qualifying for the Welsh Open, reaching the final round by eliminating Ian Preece, Jin Long and Mike Dunn, but was then beaten 4–5 by Fergal O'Brien. However, his performances were not enough for him to retain his place on tour as he finished the season ranked 81st in the world, outside of the top 64 who remained.

=== Wildcard years ===
Competing as an amateur after losing his place on the main tour, Li could not enter qualifying for any ranking events. In the next three seasons he was placed into the wildcard round for five events in his homeland of China. The best run of his career to date came in the 2011 China Open by beating Ken Doherty 5–1 in the wildcard round and Graeme Dott 5–4 in the first round. By facing Shaun Murphy in the second round he played his third former world champion in succession and led 3–1 before being edged out 4–5. He also reached the first round the following year, but was whitewashed 0–5 by Mark Selby. In 2011 and 2012 Li entered Qualifying School in an attempt to win back his place on the tour, but was unsuccessful on each occasion. In the 2012–13 season Li entered all three of the new minor-ranking Asian Players Tour Championship events. He lost in the first round of the opener and the second round of the next, but then produced a fantastic result at Event 3. He won three matches to reach the quarter-finals and then beat compatriot Zhang Anda 4–2 and established top 32 player Robert Milkins 4–1 in the semis. In his first final in a professional event Li faced Stuart Bingham and raced into a 3–1 lead with a high break of 83 before his opponent came back to win the last three frames to edge the match 4–3. The result saw him finish fourth on the Asian Order of Merit, inside the top eight who qualified for the 2013–14 snooker tour. It also gave him a place in the PTC Finals, but he lost 0–4 to Barry Hawkins in the first round.

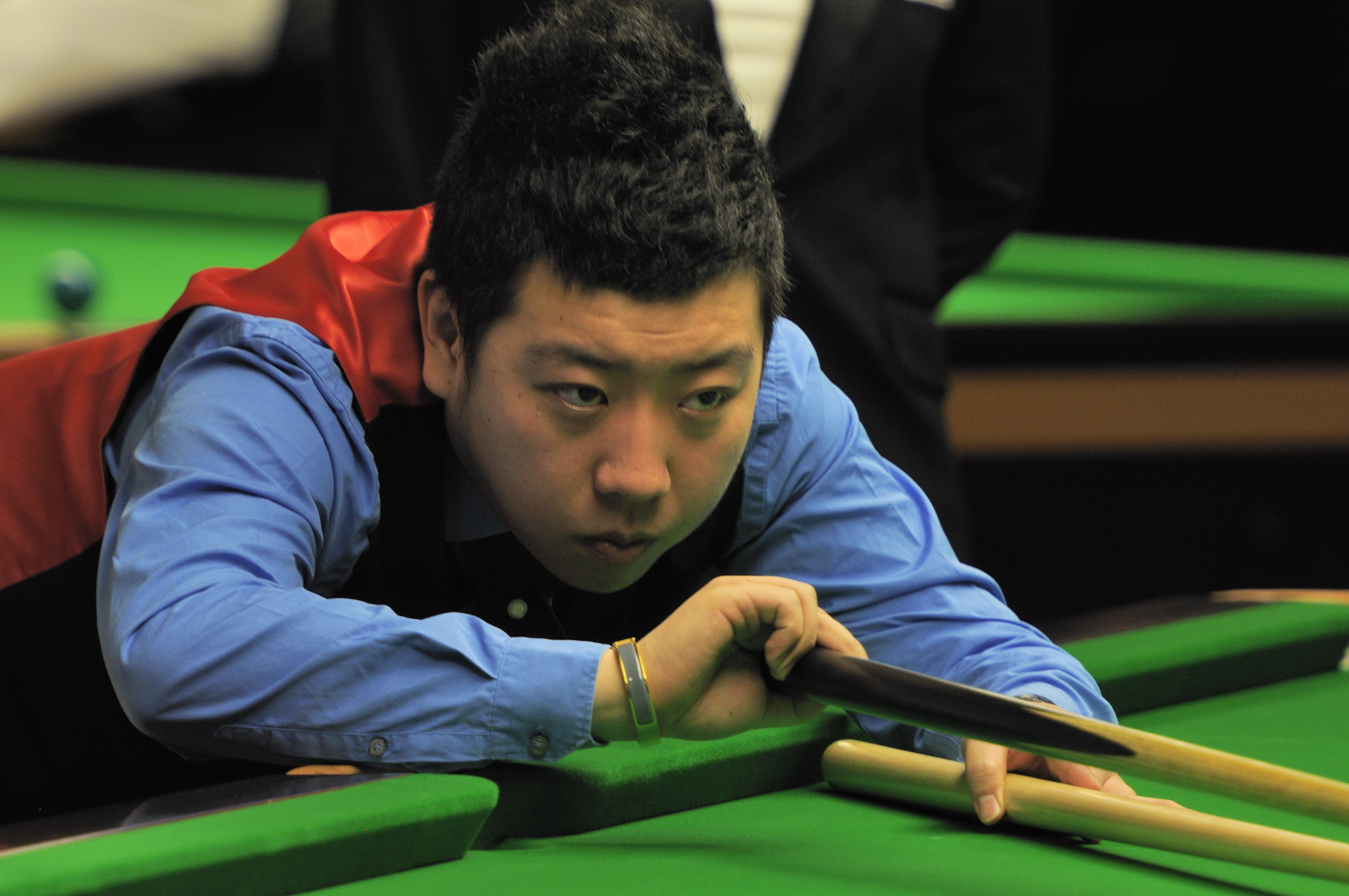
Li Hang at 2014 German Masters

=== Rejoining the tour ===
Li beat Mark Joyce in his opening match of the 2013–14 season to reach the first round of the Wuxi Classic where he made three breaks over 50 to establish a 3–0 lead over world number three Judd Trump and went on to seal a 5–2 win, the best of his career so far. He was edged out 5–4 by compatriot Xiao Guodong in the following round. At the UK Championship, Li beat David Gilbert and Andrew Higginson both by 6–4 scorelines to face world number one Neil Robertson in the last 32. Li gave the Australian a competitive game but lost 6–3, with Robertson stating afterwards that Li was much better than his ranking suggested and that his safety play had particularly impressed him. Li also qualified for the German Masters and China Open but lost 5–3 to ranking event winners Barry Hawkins and Marco Fu. Li whitewashed former world champion Peter Ebdon at the Welsh Open, before being beaten 4–1 by Anthony Hamilton in the last 64. Li was ranked world number 85 at the end of the season.

=== 2014/2015 season ===
Li won four matches at the Yixing Open, before losing 4–3 to Michael Holt in the quarter-finals. He defeated Nigel Bond, David Morris and Mark Joyce all by 5–2 scorelines to qualify for the Shanghai Masters, where he was beaten 5–3 by Stuart Bingham in the first round. At the International Championship, Li thrashed four-time world champion John Higgins 6–1 and Zhao Xintong also 6–1 to reach the last 16. A third 6–1 result followed, however it was Li's opponent Ronnie O'Sullivan who recorded it to end his tournament. Compatriot Liang Wenbo eliminated Li 5–1 in the first round of the German Masters. His second last 16 match in a ranking event came at the Indian Open thanks to wins over Allan Taylor and Stuart Carrington, but he lost 4–2 to Michael White. Following 10–1 and 10–7 victories over Chris Melling and Gary Wilson he stood one win away from qualifying for the World Championship for the first time. Li held 3–0 and 8–5 leads over Carrington but would ultimately lose 10–9. He ended a season inside the top 64 in the rankings for the first time as he was 55th.

=== 2015/2016 season ===
Li lost in the qualifying rounds for the first three ranking events of the 2015–16 season. A pair of 6–5 victories over Lee Walker and Ricky Walden saw him advance to the third round of the UK Championship, where he lost 6–3 to Jamie Burnett. Li was knocked out in the second round of the Welsh Open by Joe Perry and the only other ranking event he qualified for was the China Open, but he was beaten 5–3 by Walker in the first round.

== Performance and rankings timeline ==
Tournaments	2005/ 06	2006/ 07	2007/ 08	2008/ 09	2009/ 10	2010/ 11	2011/ 12	2012/ 13	2013/ 14	2014/ 15	2015/ 16	2016/ 17	2017/ 18	2018/ 19	2019/ 20	2020/ 21	2021/ 22	2022/ 23
Rankings (Note: From the 2010/2011 season it shows the ranking at the beginning of the season)	(Note: He was an amateur)			(Note: New players on the Main Tour don't have a ranking)	71					85	55	52	58	36	29	44	38	48
Ranking tournaments
Championship League	Not Held		Non-Ranking Event													2R	A	RR
European Masters (Note: The event was called the Malta Cup (2005/2006–2007/2008))	A	A	NR	Tournament Not Held								LQ	LQ	1R	LQ	1R	1R	WD
British Open	Tournament Not Held																2R	1R
Northern Ireland Open	Tournament Not Held											1R	2R	4R	2R	1R	LQ	3R
UK Championship	A	A	A	LQ	LQ	A	A	A	3R	1R	3R	1R	4R	2R	4R	3R	2R	LQ
Scottish Open	Tournament Not Held							MR	Tournament Not Held			3R	3R	1R	2R	SF	QF	LQ
English Open	Tournament Not Held											2R	2R	1R	2R	1R	2R	LQ
World Grand Prix	Tournament Not Held									NR	DNQ	DNQ	1R	DNQ	1R	1R	DNQ	DNQ
Shoot Out	Tournament Not Held					Non-Ranking Event						4R	1R	QF	3R	WD	1R	A
German Masters	Tournament Not Held					A	A	A	1R	1R	LQ	LQ	LQ	1R	LQ	LQ	LQ	WD
Welsh Open	A	A	A	LQ	LQ	A	A	A	2R	2R	2R	1R	WD	1R	1R	1R	1R	A
Players Championship (Note: The event was called the Players Tour Championship Grand Finals (2010/2011–2012/2013))	Tournament Not Held					A	A	1R	DNQ	DNQ	DNQ	DNQ	DNQ	DNQ	DNQ	DNQ	DNQ	DNQ
WST Classic	Tournament Not Held																	A
Tour Championship	Tournament Not Held													DNQ	DNQ	DNQ	DNQ	DNQ
World Championship	A	A	A	LQ	LQ	A	A	A	LQ	LQ	LQ	LQ	LQ	1R	A	LQ	LQ	A
Non-ranking tournaments
The Masters	A	A	A	LQ	A	A	A	A	A	A	A	A	A	A	A	A	A	A
Championship League	Not Held		A	A	A	A	A	A	A	A	A	A	A	A	A	RR	A	A
Six-red World Championship (Note: The event was called the Six-red Snooker International (2008/2009) and the Six-red World Grand Prix (2009/2010))	Tournament Not Held			A	A	A	NH	RR	A	A	A	A	A	A	A	Not Held		A
Former ranking tournaments
Northern Ireland Trophy	NR	A	A	LQ	Tournament Not Held													
Bahrain Championship	Tournament Not Held			LQ	Tournament Not Held													
Wuxi Classic (Note: The event was called the Jiangsu Classic (2008/2009–2009/2010))	Tournament Not Held			Non-Ranking Event				WR	2R	LQ	Tournament Not Held							
Australian Goldfields Open	Tournament Not Held						A	A	LQ	LQ	LQ	Tournament Not Held						
Shanghai Masters	Not Held		A	LQ	WD	WR	WR	A	LQ	1R	LQ	LQ	LQ	Non-Ranking		Tournament Not Held		
Paul Hunter Classic	Pro-am Event					Minor-Ranking Event						3R	A	A	NR	Tournament Not Held		
Indian Open	Tournament Not Held								LQ	3R	NH	LQ	1R	QF	Tournament Not Held			
China Open	WR	1R	WR	LQ	LQ	2R	1R	A	1R	LQ	1R	2R	LQ	3R	Tournament Not Held			
Riga Masters (Note: The event was called the Riga Open (2014/2015–2015/2016))	Tournament Not Held									Minor-Ranking		2R	LQ	2R	QF	Tournament Not Held		
International Championship	Tournament Not Held							A	LQ	3R	LQ	2R	2R	1R	LQ	Tournament Not Held		
China Championship	Tournament Not Held											NR	SF	LQ	2R	Tournament Not Held		
World Open	Tournament Not Held					A	A	A	LQ	Not Held		LQ	QF	LQ	1R	Tournament Not Held		
WST Pro Series	Tournament Not Held															RR	Not Held	
Turkish Masters	Tournament Not Held																LQ	NH
Gibraltar Open	Tournament Not Held										MR	A	2R	A	4R	1R	WD	NH
Former non-ranking tournaments
Beijing International Challenge	Tournament Not Held				A	LQ	Tournament Not Held											
Wuxi Classic	Tournament Not Held			RR	RR	A	A	Ranking Event			Tournament Not Held							
Shoot Out	Tournament Not Held					A	A	A	A	A	2R	Ranking Event						
Haining Open	Tournament Not Held									Minor-Ranking		F	4R	F	F	NH	A	NH

Performance Table Legend
LQ	lost in the qualifying draw	#R	lost in the early rounds of the tournament (WR = Wildcard round, RR = Round robin)	QF	lost in the quarter-finals
SF	lost in the semi-finals	F	lost in the final	W	won the tournament
DNQ	did not qualify for the tournament	A	did not participate in the tournament	WD	withdrew from the tournament

NH / Not Held	means an event was not held.
NR / Non-Ranking Event	means an event is/was no longer a ranking event.
R / Ranking Event	means an event is/was a ranking event.
MR / Minor-Ranking Event	means an event is/was a minor-ranking event.

== Career finals ==
=== Minor-ranking finals: 1 ===
Outcome	No.	Year	Championship	Opponent in the final	Score
Runner-up	1.	2012	Zhengzhou Open	(England) Stuart Bingham	3–4

=== Non-ranking finals: 4 ===
Outcome	No.	Year	Championship	Opponent in the final	Score
Runner-up	1.	2005	HK Spring Trophy	(China) Jin Long	#
Runner-up	2.	2016	Haining Open	(England) Matthew Selt	3–5
Runner-up	3.	2018	Haining Open (2)	(England) Mark Selby	4–5
Runner-up	4.	2019	Haining Open (3)	(Thailand) Thepchaiya Un-Nooh	3–5

=== Amateur finals: 2 (1 title) ===
Outcome	No.	Year	Championship	Opponent in the final	Score
Winner	1.	2008	ACBS Asian Under-21 Championship	(China) Li Yuan	6–1
Runner-up	1.	2010	IBSF World Under-21 Championship	(England) Sam Craigie	8–9
