= 2012 Wuxi Classic =

Wuxi Classic
Tournament information
- Dates: 25 June – 1 July 2012
- Venue: Wuxi City Sports Park Stadium
- City: Wuxi
- Country: China
- Organisation: World Snooker
- Format: Ranking event
- Total prize fund: £405,000
- Winner's share: £75,000
- Highest break: Stuart Bingham (ENG) (147)

Final
- Champion: Ricky Walden (ENG)
- Runner-up: Stuart Bingham (ENG)
- Score: 10–4

The 2012 Wuxi Classic was a professional ranking snooker tournament held between 25 June–1 July 2012 at the Wuxi City Sports Park Stadium in Wuxi, China. It was the first year of the tournament as a ranking event, having been non-ranking in its previous playings. It was also the first ranking event of the 2012/2013 season.

Mark Selby was the defending champion, but he lost in the quarter-finals 5–4 against Stuart Bingham.

Ricky Walden won his second ranking title by defeating Bingham 10–4 in the final. During the final Bingham made the 89th official maximum break. This was Bingham's third 147 break.

== Prize fund ==
It was announced on 2 May 2012, that this year's prize money would be £400,000, which would rise to £425,000 for next year and then to £450,000 for the following three years. The breakdown of prize money for this year is shown below:

- Winner: £75,000
- Runner-up: £30,000
- Semi-final: £18,000
- Quarter-final: £10,000
- Last 16: £7,500
- Last 32: £6,000
- Last 48: £2,300
- Last 64: £1,500
- Non-televised highest break: £200
- Televised highest break: £2,000
- Televised maximum break: £5,000
- Total: £405,000

== Wildcard round ==
These matches were played in Wuxi on 25 and 26 June 2012.

Match		Score	
WC1	Ken Doherty (IRL)	5–4	Lu Ning (CHN)
WC2	Jamie Burnett (SCO)	5–3	Jin Long (CHN)
WC3	Michael White (WAL)	4–5	Zhou Yuelong (CHN)
WC4	Rod Lawler (ENG)	5–2	Li Hang (CHN)
WC5	Dave Harold (ENG)	1–5	Rouzi Maimaiti (CHN)
WC6	Fergal O'Brien (IRL)	5–2	Lyu Haotian (CHN)
WC7	Michael Holt (ENG)	1–5	Zhu Yinghui (CHN)
WC8	Robert Milkins (ENG)	5–2	Chen Feilong (CHN)

== Main draw ==
Last 32; Best of 9 frames
1	(England) Mark Selby	5
(England) Barry Hawkins	2
12	(England) Martin Gould	3
(England) Jamie Cope	5
14	(England) Stuart Bingham	5
(England) Peter Ebdon	4
5	(England) Shaun Murphy	1
(Republic of Ireland) Ken Doherty	5
6	(Australia) Neil Robertson	1
(Scotland) Jamie Burnett	5
9	(China) Ding Junhui	2
(England) Mark Davis	5
11	(Scotland) Graeme Dott	5
(China) Zhou Yuelong	1
4	(Scotland) Stephen Maguire	4
(England) Rod Lawler	5
3	(Wales) Mark Williams	5
(England) Tom Ford	0
10	(Northern Ireland) Mark Allen	5
(China) Rouzi Maimaiti	1
15	(England) Ali Carter	3
(Republic of Ireland) Fergal O'Brien	5
7	(England) Stephen Lee	1
(Scotland) Marcus Campbell	5
8	(Wales) Matthew Stevens	w/d
(England) Joe Perry	w/o
13	(England) Ricky Walden	5
(China) Zhu Yinghui	0
16	(England) Andrew Higginson	3
(England) Robert Milkins	5
2	(England) Judd Trump	5
(Wales) Dominic Dale	1

Last 16; Best of 9 frames
1	(England) Mark Selby	5
(England) Jamie Cope	0
14	(England) Stuart Bingham	5
(Republic of Ireland) Ken Doherty	4
(Scotland) Jamie Burnett	3
(England) Mark Davis	5
11	(Scotland) Graeme Dott	5
(England) Rod Lawler	4
3	(Wales) Mark Williams	5
10	(Northern Ireland) Mark Allen	3
(Republic of Ireland) Fergal O'Brien	2
(Scotland) Marcus Campbell	5
(England) Joe Perry	4
13	(England) Ricky Walden	5
(England) Robert Milkins	5
2	(England) Judd Trump	3

Quarter-finals; Best of 9 frames
1	(England) Mark Selby	4
14	(England) Stuart Bingham	5
(England) Mark Davis	5
11	(Scotland) Graeme Dott	0
3	(Wales) Mark Williams	3
(Scotland) Marcus Campbell	5
13	(England) Ricky Walden	5
(England) Robert Milkins	3

Semi-finals; Best of 11 frames
14	(England) Stuart Bingham	6
(England) Mark Davis	5
(Scotland) Marcus Campbell	1
13	(England) Ricky Walden	6

Final; Best of 19 frames
14	(England) Stuart Bingham	4
13	(England) Ricky Walden	10

== Final ==
Final: Best of 19 frames. Referee: Brendan Moore. Wuxi City Sports Park Stadium, Wuxi, China, 1 July 2012.
Stuart Bingham (14); England	4–10	Ricky Walden (13); England
Afternoon: 57–59, 43–53, 1–69 (69), 22–62, 24–54, 147–0 (147), 1–57 (56), 33–65; Evening: 34–76, 24–74 (73), 103–0 (103), 100–0 (100), 92–20, 41–84 (74)
147	Highest break	74
3	Century breaks	0
3	50+ breaks	4

== Qualifying ==
These matches were held between 5 and 8 June 2012 at the World Snooker Academy in Sheffield, England. In the fourth frame of the match between Dominic Dale and Peter Lines, a 20-year-old record from the 1992 Asian Open was broken. They accumulated 192 points, then the most in a single frame in the history of snooker. Lines won the frame 108–84. The previous record was 185, made when Sean Storey defeated Graham Cripsey 93–92. The record stood until the quarter-finals of the 2023 UK Championship, when Mark Williams won frame eight of his match against Ding Junhui by a score of 101–94, for a total of 195 points.

Round 1 Best of 9 frames
(Thailand) Thepchaiya Un-Nooh	5
(England) Robbie Williams	2
(India) Aditya Mehta	5
(England) Sam Baird	3
(India) Pankaj Advani	4
(China) Chen Zhe	5
(Malta) Tony Drago	5
(England) Sean O'Sullivan	1
(Belgium) Luca Brecel	5
(Wales) Daniel Wells	1
(Iran) Hossein Vafaei	w/d
(Scotland) Fraser Patrick	w/o
(Thailand) Thanawat Thirapongpaiboon	5
(England) Ian Burns	3
(China) Zhang Anda	3
(England) Rod Lawler	5
(China) Tian Pengfei	5
(Wales) Duane Jones	4
(England) David Grace	2
(England) Martin O'Donnell	5
(Australia) Ben Judge	1
(England) Adrian Gunnell	5
(Scotland) Michael Leslie	2
(England) Paul Davison	5
(England) Liam Highfield	4
(England) Michael Wasley	5
(Norway) Kurt Maflin	5
(England) Jamie O'Neill	3
(England) Craig Steadman	5
(England) Michael Wild	3
(China) Cao Yupeng	4
(England) Joel Walker	5

Round 2 Best of 9 frames
(England) Jimmy Robertson	5
(Thailand) Thepchaiya Un-Nooh	0
(Thailand) James Wattana	1
(India) Aditya Mehta	5
(England) Simon Bedford	5
(China) Chen Zhe	0
(England) Adam Duffy	3
(Malta) Tony Drago	5
(Thailand) Dechawat Poomjaeng	4
(Belgium) Luca Brecel	5
(England) Mark Joyce	5
(Scotland) Fraser Patrick	3
(Wales) Michael White	5
(Thailand) Thanawat Thirapongpaiboon	3
(China) Yu Delu	4
(England) Rod Lawler	5
(England) Barry Pinches	5
(China) Tian Pengfei	0
(England) Alfie Burden	5
(England) Martin O'Donnell	3
(China) Li Yan	5
(England) Adrian Gunnell	2
(England) David Gilbert	5
(England) Paul Davison	3
(Thailand) Passakorn Suwannawat	5
(England) Michael Wasley	1
(England) Andy Hicks	1
(Norway) Kurt Maflin	5
(China) Liu Chuang	5
(England) Craig Steadman	4
(England) Peter Lines	5
(England) Joel Walker	4

Round 3 Best of 9 frames
(England) Nigel Bond	3
(England) Jimmy Robertson	5
(England) Jimmy White	1
(India) Aditya Mehta	5
(England) Matthew Selt	5
(England) Simon Bedford	3
(England) Jack Lisowski	5
(Malta) Tony Drago	1
(Scotland) Jamie Burnett	5
(Belgium) Luca Brecel	4
(England) Rory McLeod	5
(England) Mark Joyce	3
(China) Xiao Guodong	1
(Wales) Michael White	5
(China) Liang Wenbo	3
(England) Rod Lawler	5
(Scotland) Alan McManus	2
(England) Barry Pinches	5
(England) Dave Harold	5
(England) Alfie Burden	4
(Northern Ireland) Gerard Greene	5
(China) Li Yan	1
(Scotland) Anthony McGill	4
(England) David Gilbert	5
(England) Ben Woollaston	1
(Thailand) Passakorn Suwannawat	5
(England) Steve Davis	3
(Norway) Kurt Maflin	5
(England) Robert Milkins	5
(China) Liu Chuang	4
(England) Mike Dunn	1
(England) Peter Lines	5

Round 4 Best of 9 frames
(England) Barry Hawkins	5
(England) Jimmy Robertson	4
(England) Jamie Cope	5
(India) Aditya Mehta	4
(England) Peter Ebdon	5
(England) Matthew Selt	4
(Republic of Ireland) Ken Doherty	5
(England) Jack Lisowski	3
(Hong Kong) Marco Fu	2
(Scotland) Jamie Burnett	5
(England) Mark Davis	5
(England) Rory McLeod	2
(England) Anthony Hamilton	4
(Wales) Michael White	5
(Wales) Jamie Jones	2
(England) Rod Lawler	5
(England) Tom Ford	5
(England) Barry Pinches	0
(England) Mark King	4
(England) Dave Harold	5
(Republic of Ireland) Fergal O'Brien	5
(Northern Ireland) Gerard Greene	3
(Scotland) Marcus Campbell	5
(England) David Gilbert	4
(England) Joe Perry	5
(Thailand) Passakorn Suwannawat	1
(England) Michael Holt	5
(Norway) Kurt Maflin	4
(Wales) Ryan Day	0
(England) Robert Milkins	5
(Wales) Dominic Dale	5
(England) Peter Lines	4

== Century breaks ==
=== Qualifying stage centuries ===
- 136 – Thepchaiya Un-Nooh
- 136 – Mark Joyce
- 136 – Dechawat Poomjaeng
- 131 – David Grace
- 131 – Passakorn Suwannawat
- 130, 110 – Joe Perry
- 128, 102 – Anthony Hamilton
- 127 – Ian Burns
- 123, 105 – Kurt Maflin
- 123 – Simon Bedford
- 122, 108, 105 – Luca Brecel
- 118 – Chen Zhe
- 118 – Fergal O'Brien
- 112, 111 – Liam Highfield
- 112, 106, 100 – Jimmy Robertson
- 110, 105 – Mark King
- 110 – Dave Harold
- 107 – Michael Holt
- 107 – Paul Davison
- 104 – Zhang Anda
- 104 – Liu Chuang
- 103 – Marco Fu
- 100 – Yu Delu
- 100 – Michael White

=== Televised stage centuries ===
- 147, 143, 134, 124, 110, 103, 100 – Stuart Bingham
- 137, 113, 108 – Judd Trump
- 129 – Rod Lawler
- 120, 101 – Mark Selby
- 115 – Zhou Yuelong
- 104, 102 – Ricky Walden
- 102 – Ken Doherty
- 101 – Lu Ning
