= Chen Zhe =

Chinese snooker player (born 1993)

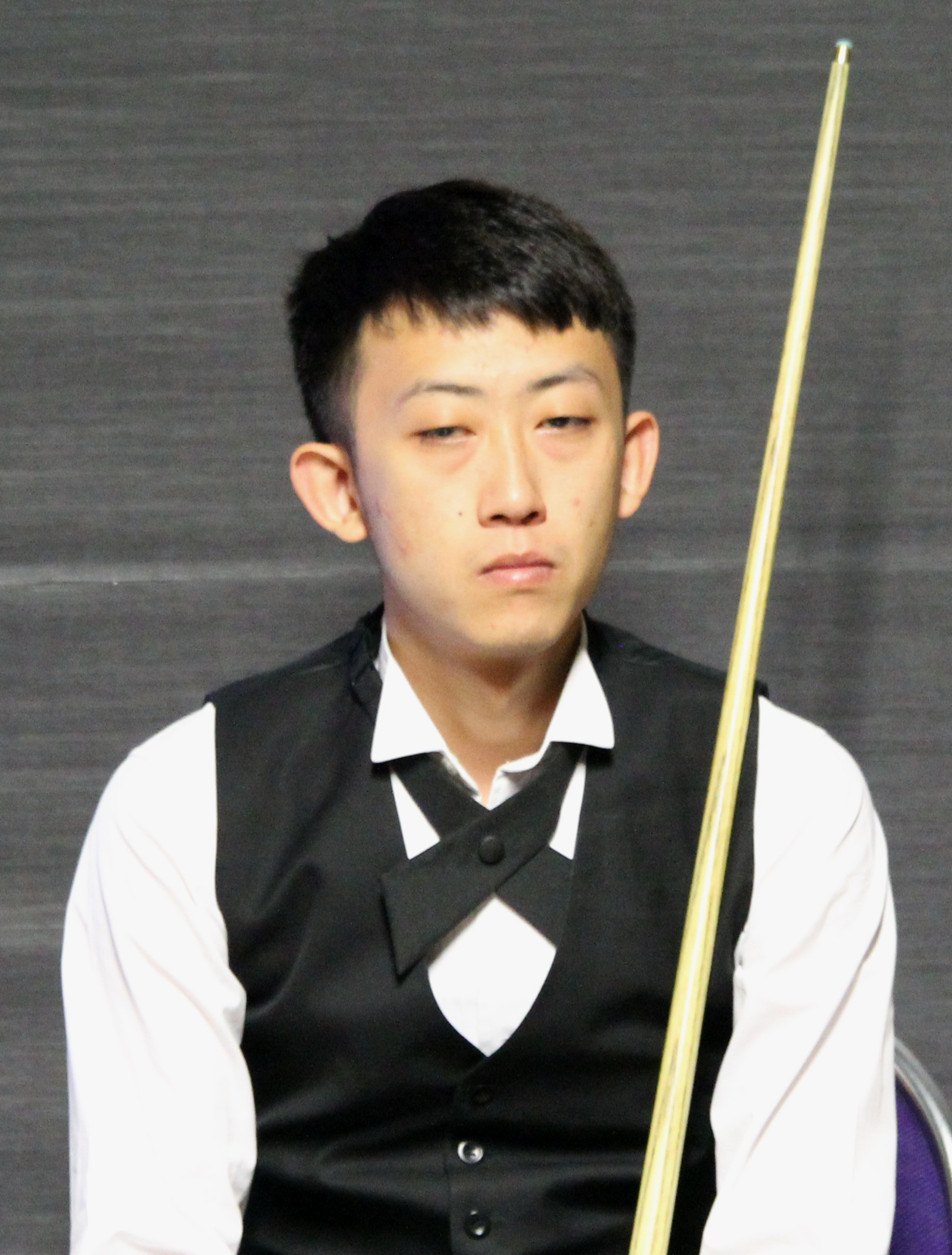
- Chen at the 2016 Paul Hunter Classic

Personal information
- Nickname: Sleepy
- Born: 28 February 1993 (age 33) Taiyuan, Shanxi, China

Sport
- Country: China
- Sport: Snooker
- Professional: 2012–2014, 2016–2018
- Highest ranking: 66 (July 2012)
- Best ranking finish: Last 32 (x1)

Chen Zhe (Chinese: 陈喆; born 28 February 1993) is a Chinese former professional snooker player from Shanxi who won five matches at the 2012 Q School to earn a two-year card to play on the World Snooker Tour starting in the 2012–13 season. He is based in Romford, England during the season and practices with Ronnie O'Sullivan.

== Career ==
=== Debut season ===
Chen won his first professional match on the Main Tour beating Pankaj Advani 5–4 in the 2012 Wuxi Classic first qualifying round. He was whitewashed 0–5 by Simon Bedford in the next round. He won three matches to reach the final qualifying round of both the World Open and China Open, losing to Michael Holt (3–5) and Jamie Cope (4–5) respectively. Chen got through to the semi-finals of the minor ranking Asian Players Tour Championship Event 1 by defeating the likes of Tom Ford and Ben Woollaston, but lost 2–4 to Stephen Lee. His season ended when he was beaten 7–10 by Sam Baird in the first round of World Championship Qualifying, which saw him finish his first season on tour ranked world number 78.

=== 2013/2014 season ===
In his opening match of the 2013–14 season, Chen defeated Matthew Selt 5–3 to qualify for the 2013 Wuxi Classic in China where he lost 5–2 to Ben Woollaston in the first round. Chen also qualified for the Indian Open with a 4–2 win over Robert Milkins, but was beaten 4–3 by Hammad Miah. Chen did not win another match in ranking events until in qualifying for the final event of the year, the World Championship, where he beat Anthony Parsons 10–8, before losing by a reverse of this scoreline in the second round against Mark Joyce. At the end of his second season Chen was ranked world number 89 and was relegated from the main tour as he was not in the top 64. He entered Q School to try and earn his place back with Chen being two wins from succeeding in the first event, but he lost 4–1 to Chris Melling.

=== 2014/2015 season ===
Chen's 2014–15 season was restricted to appearances at the three Asian Tour events. He was beaten 4–1 by Ju Reti in the first round of the Yixing Open and saw off Liang Wenbo 4–3 at the Haining City Open, before losing 4–3 to Ross Muir in the second round. At the Xuzhou Open he beat Feng Zeyuan, but surrendered a 3–0 lead in the second round against Mark Williams to be defeated 4–3. Chen entered the 2015 Q School and came close to progressing through the first event as he won four matches to reach the final round, where he lost 4–1 to Sydney Wilson. In the second event he was knocked out in the first round 4–0 by Andy Hicks.

=== 2015/2016 season ===
Chen successfully progressed through the first event of the 2016 Q School by winning five matches, concluding with a 4–1 victory over David Lilley to secure a new two-year tour place.

=== 2016/2017 season ===
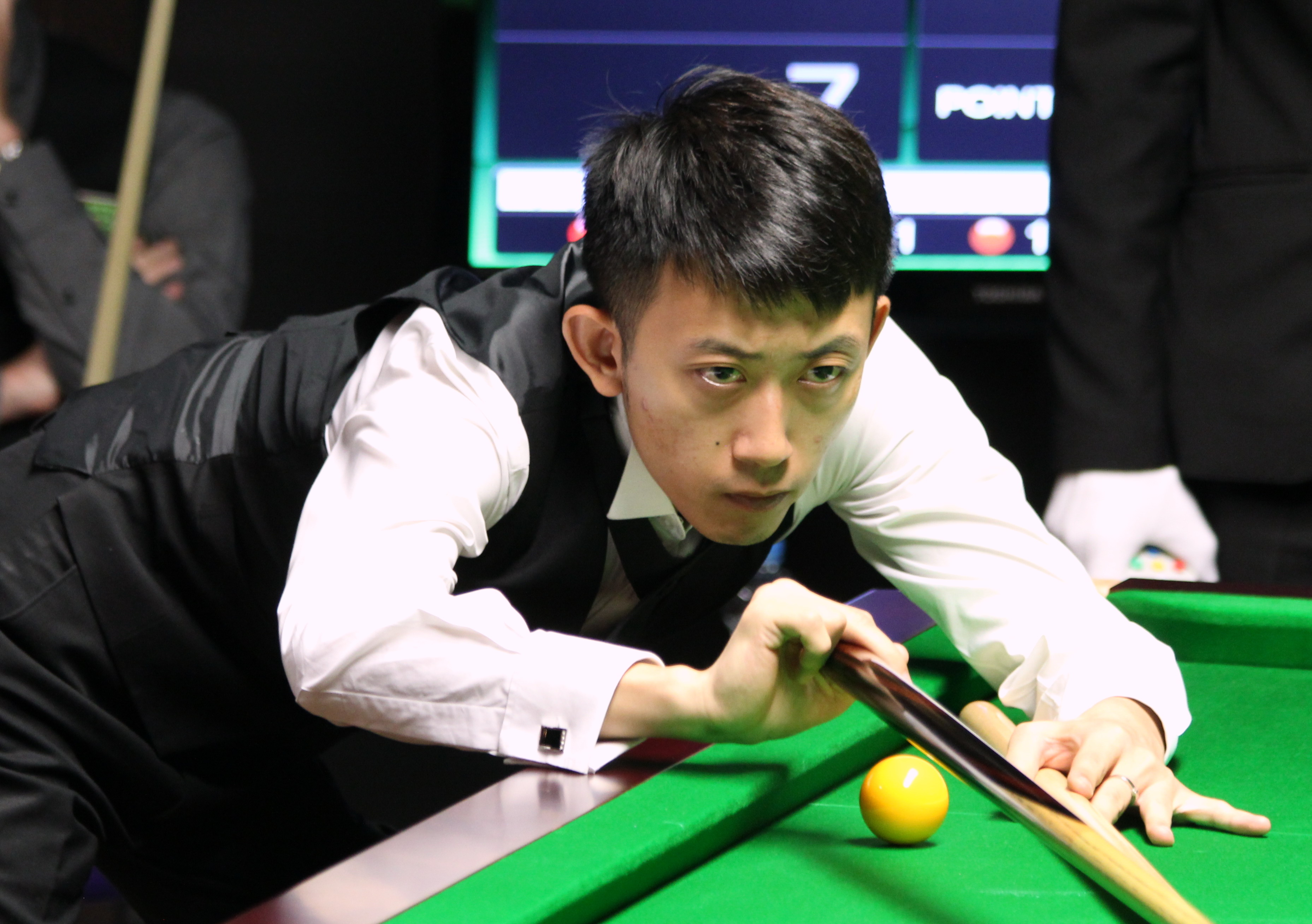
2016 Paul Hunter Classic

Chen won a match at the venue stage of a ranking event for the first time by defeating Ross Muir 4–1 in the first round of the Northern Ireland Open. He narrowly lost 4–3 to Michael White in the following round after having been 2–0 up. His only other match win after this came at the Shoot-Out.

== Performance and rankings timeline ==
Tournament	2010/ 11	2011/ 12	2012/ 13	2013/ 14	2014/ 15	2015/ 16	2016/ 17	2017/ 18	2018/ 19
Ranking (Note: It shows the ranking at the beginning of the season.)	(Note: He was an amateur.)		(Note: New players on the Main Tour don't have a ranking.)	78				93	
Ranking tournaments
Riga Masters (Note: The event was called the Riga Open (2014/2015–2015/2016))	Tournament Not Held				Minor-Rank.		WD	LQ	A
World Open	A	A	LQ	LQ	Not Held		LQ	2R	A
Paul Hunter Classic	Minor-Ranking Event						1R	WD	A
China Championship	Tournament Not Held						NR	LQ	A
European Masters	Tournament Not Held						LQ	1R	A
English Open	Tournament Not Held						1R	1R	A
International Championship	Not Held		LQ	LQ	A	A	LQ	LQ	A
Northern Ireland Open	Tournament Not Held						2R	1R	A
UK Championship	A	A	LQ	1R	A	A	1R	1R	A
Scottish Open	Not Held		MR	Tournament Not Held			1R	1R	A
German Masters	A	A	LQ	LQ	A	A	LQ	LQ	A
World Grand Prix	Tournament Not Held				NH	DNQ	DNQ	DNQ	DNQ
Welsh Open	A	A	LQ	1R	A	A	1R	1R	A
Shoot-Out	Variant Format Event						2R	1R	A
Indian Open	Not Held			1R	A	NH	LQ	LQ	A
Players Championship (Note: The event was called the Players Tour Championship Grand Finals (2010/2011–2012/2013))	DNQ	DNQ	DNQ	DNQ	DNQ	DNQ	DNQ	DNQ	DNQ
Gibraltar Open	Tournament Not Held					MR	A	1R	A
Tour Championship	Tournament Not Held								DNQ
China Open	A	A	LQ	LQ	A	A	LQ	1R	A
World Championship	A	A	LQ	LQ	A	A	LQ	LQ	A
Non-ranking tournaments
Haining Open	Tournament Not Held				MR		2R	4R	4R
Former ranking tournaments
Wuxi Classic	NR		LQ	1R	A	Tournament Not Held			
Australian Goldfields Open	A	A	LQ	LQ	A	LQ	Not Held		
Shanghai Masters	A	A	LQ	LQ	A	A	LQ	LQ	NR

Performance Table Legend
LQ	lost in the qualifying draw	#R	lost in the early rounds of the tournament (WR = Wildcard round, RR = Round robin)	QF	lost in the quarter-finals
SF	lost in the semi-finals	F	lost in the final	W	won the tournament
DNQ	did not qualify for the tournament	A	did not participate in the tournament	WD	withdrew from the tournament

NH / Not Held	means an event was not held.
NR / Non-Ranking Event	means an event is/was no longer a ranking event.
R / Ranking Event	means an event is/was a ranking event.
MR / Minor-Ranking Event	means an event is/was a minor-ranking event.
