= 2017 Haining Open =

CBSA Haining International Snooker Open
Tournament information
- Dates: 23–27 October 2017
- Venue: Haining Sports Center
- City: Haining
- Country: China
- Organisation: Chinese Billiards & Snooker Association
- Format: Non-ranking event
- Total prize fund: ¥472,000
- Winner's share: ¥120,000
- Highest break: (England) Mark Selby (147)

Final
- Champion: (England) Mark Selby
- Runner-up: (England) Tom Ford
- Score: 5–1

The 2017 CBSA Haining International Snooker Open was a non-ranking snooker tournament that took place from 23 to 27 October 2017 in Haining, China.

Matthew Selt was the defending champion, but he lost 2–4 against Yu Delu in the quarter-finals.

Mark Selby defeated Tom Ford 5–1 in the final and made a maximum break in the third frame. Selby's maximum does not count on the official maximum break list as this was a CBSA organised tournament.

== Prize fund ==
The breakdown of prize money of the event is shown below:

	Prize fund
Winner	¥120,000
Runner-up	¥50,000
Semi-finalist	¥20,000
Quarter-finalist	¥10,000
Last 16	¥6,000
Last 32	¥4,000
Last 64	¥2,500
Highest break	¥10,000
Maximum break	¥20,000
Total	¥472,000

== Main draw ==
=== Top half ===
==== Section 1 ====
Last 128; Best of 7 frames
(China) Guo Chuan	0
(China) Sun Jianjun	4
(China) Yang Zhongjie	2
(China) Xue Jirong	4
(China) Guo Jiajun	0
(China) Pang Junxu	4
(China) Wang Yuchen	4
(China) Zhou Jun	0
(China) Geng Mingqi	4
(China) Chen Wen	2
(China) Meng Yingjiu	2
(Myanmar) Win Koko	4
(China) Wu Zhe	1
(China) Li Yuan	4

Last 64; Best of 7 frames
(England) Matthew Selt	4
(China) Sun Jianjun	0
(China) Xue Jirong	4
(China) Pang Junxu	3
(China) Wang Yuchen	4
(China) Geng Mingqi	2
(Myanmar) Win Koko	3
(China) Li Yuan	4

Last 32; Best of 7 frames
(England) Matthew Selt	4
(China) Xue Jirong	0
(China) Wang Yuchen	2
(China) Li Yuan	4

Last 16; Best of 7 frames
(England) Matthew Selt	4
(China) Li Yuan	2

==== Section 2 ====
Last 128; Best of 7 frames
(China) Si Jiahui	2
(China) Lu Ning	4
(China) Li Yingdong	4
(China) Chen Bo	2
(China) Luo Zetao	1
(China) Qi Guoxiao	4
(China) Deng Haohui	4
(China) Tang Jun	0
(China) He Guoqiang	4
(China) Tang Hewen	2
(China) Li Ting	3
(China) Ren Jiaxing	4

Last 64; Best of 7 frames
(China) Yu Delu	4
(China) Lu Ning	1
(China) Li Yingdong	1
(China) Qi Guoxiao	4
(China) Deng Haohui	0
(China) He Guoqiang	4
(China) Ren Jiaxing	4
(China) Ju Reti	2

Last 32; Best of 7 frames
(China) Yu Delu	4
(China) Qi Guoxiao	2
(China) He Guoqiang	4
(China) Ren Jiaxing	1

Last 16; Best of 7 frames
(China) Yu Delu	4
(China) He Guoqiang	0

==== Section 3 ====
Last 128; Best of 7 frames
(China) Chang Bingyu	4
(China) Yin Xiaowei	0
(China) Feng Zeyuan	w/d
(China) Peng Yisong	w/o
(China) Long Zehuang	4
(China) Zhong Lin	1
(England) Gary Wilson	4
(China) Wang Zepeng	2
(China) Bo Junjie	2
(England) Elliot Slessor	4
(China) Tong Zhaoqing	1
(China) Cheng Sihong	4

Last 64; Best of 7 frames
(China) Chen Zhe	4
(China) Chang Bingyu	0
(China) Peng Yisong	1
(China) Long Zehuang	4
(England) Gary Wilson	1
(England) Elliot Slessor	4
(China) Cheng Sihong	0
(China) Niu Zhuang	4

Last 32; Best of 7 frames
(China) Chen Zhe	4
(China) Long Zehuang	2
(England) Elliot Slessor	4
(China) Niu Zhuang	3

Last 16; Best of 7 frames
(China) Chen Zhe	3
(England) Elliot Slessor	4

==== Section 4 ====
Last 128; Best of 7 frames
(Scotland) Ross Muir	4
(China) Liang Xiaolong	0
(China) Qin Jianfeng	1
(China) Deng Jinhong	4
(China) Song Yang	0
(England) Tom Ford	4
(Myanmar) Phone Myint Kyaw	4
(China) Tu Taojin	1
(China) Wang Chenkai	0
(China) Lei Peifan	4
(China) Zhang Yong	4
(China) Li Yan	1

Last 64; Best of 7 frames
(China) Ma Chunmao	4
(Scotland) Ross Muir	0
(China) Deng Jinhong	0
(England) Tom Ford	4
(Myanmar) Phone Myint Kyaw	4
(China) Lei Peifan	0
(China) Zhang Yong	4
(China) Cao Yupeng	1

Last 32; Best of 7 frames
(China) Ma Chunmao	0
(England) Tom Ford	4
(Myanmar) Phone Myint Kyaw	2
(China) Zhang Yong	4

Last 16; Best of 7 frames
(England) Tom Ford	4
(China) Zhang Yong	1

=== Bottom half ===
==== Section 5 ====
Last 128; Best of 7 frames
(China) Hu Hao	4
(China) Li Zhen	2
(China) Wu Yize	4
(China) Ma Yinzhu	1
(China) Chen Feng	4
(China) Bai Yulu	2
(England) Stuart Bingham	4
(China) Shen Jianming	0
(China) Li Luojun	0
(China) Tian Pengfei	4
(China) Zhao Hanyang	2
(China) Li Jun	4

Last 64; Best of 7 frames
(China) Li Hang	4
(China) Hu Hao	0
(China) Wu Yize	4
(China) Chen Feng	1
(England) Stuart Bingham	4
(China) Tian Pengfei	3
(China) Li Jun	2
(China) Zhang Jiankang	4

Last 32; Best of 7 frames
(China) Li Hang	4
(China) Wu Yize	0
(England) Stuart Bingham	4
(China) Zhang Jiankang	3

Last 16; Best of 7 frames
(China) Li Hang	1
(England) Stuart Bingham	4

==== Section 6 ====
Last 128; Best of 7 frames
(China) Luo Honghao	4
(China) Huang Jiahao	3
(China) Tian Chunming	0
(China) Mei Xiwen	4
(China) Sima Jun	4
(Scotland) Eden Sharav	1
(China) Pan Weixing	4
(China) Yang Jiaxin	1
(China) Tan Bangqin	1
(China) Yang Qingtian	4
(China) Wang Haonan	1
(China) Xiao Guodong	4

Last 64; Best of 7 frames
(China) Rouzi Maimaiti	1
(China) Luo Honghao	4
(China) Mei Xiwen	4
(China) Sima Jun	0
(China) Pan Weixing	3
(China) Yang Qingtian	4
(China) Xiao Guodong	3
(China) Chen Feilong	4

Last 32; Best of 7 frames
(China) Luo Honghao	1
(China) Mei Xiwen	4
(China) Yang Qingtian	4
(China) Chen Feilong	2

Last 16; Best of 7 frames
(China) Mei Xiwen	4
(China) Yang Qingtian	1

==== Section 7 ====
Last 128; Best of 7 frames
(China) Chen Ruifu	3
(China) Guan Zhen	4
(China) Wu Shengguang	4
(China) Xie Xiang	1
(China) Shen Cheng	1
(China) Zhang Hao	4
(China) Lü Chenwei	1
(China) Bai Langning	4
(China) Wu Xiangyang	1
(China) Zhao Jianbo	4
(China) Chen Junhao	1
(Myanmar) Ko Htet	4

Last 64; Best of 7 frames
(China) Fan Zhengyi	4
(China) Guan Zhen	1
(China) Wu Shengguang	2
(China) Zhang Hao	4
(China) Bai Langning	1
(China) Zhao Jianbo	4
(Myanmar) Ko Htet	2
(China) Lyu Haotian	4

Last 32; Best of 7 frames
(China) Fan Zhengyi	4
(China) Zhang Hao	1
(China) Zhao Jianbo	1
(China) Lyu Haotian	4

Last 16; Best of 7 frames
(China) Fan Zhengyi	4
(China) Lyu Haotian	2

==== Section 8 ====
Last 128; Best of 7 frames
(China) He Wenchong	2
(China) Ma Tingpeng	4
(China) Huang Zhong	1
(China) Liu Jiaming	4
(China) Shen Haoran	2
(China) Jin Long	4
(China) Liu Yiqi	1
(England) Mark Selby	4
(China) Zhang Zhijie	4
(China) Lei Zhen	3
(China) Qiu Yalong	4
(China) Wang Peng	3
(China) Yao Pengcheng	w/d
(England) Craig Steadman	w/o

Last 64; Best of 7 frames
(China) Ma Tingpeng	4
(China) Liu Jiaming	2
(China) Jin Long	2
(England) Mark Selby	4
(China) Zhang Zhijie	2
(China) Qiu Yalong	4
(England) Craig Steadman	1
(China) Zhang Anda	4

Last 32; Best of 7 frames
(China) Ma Tingpeng	2
(England) Mark Selby	4
(China) Qiu Yalong	3
(China) Zhang Anda	4

Last 16; Best of 7 frames
(England) Mark Selby	4
(China) Zhang Anda	0

=== Finals ===
Quarter-finals; Best of 7 frames
(England) Matthew Selt	2
(China) Yu Delu	4
(England) Elliot Slessor	2
(England) Tom Ford	4
(England) Stuart Bingham	4
(China) Mei Xiwen	2
(China) Fan Zhengyi	0
(England) Mark Selby	4

Semi-finals; Best of 7 frames
(China) Yu Delu	3
(England) Tom Ford	4
(England) Stuart Bingham	1
(England) Mark Selby	4

Final; Best of 9 frames
(England) Tom Ford	1
(England) Mark Selby	5

== Final ==
Final: Best of 9 frames. Referee: Haining Sports Center, Haining, China, 27 October 2017.
Tom Ford; England	1–5	Mark Selby; England
60–67 (Ford 50), 68–58 (61, 58), 0–147 (147), 0–76 (76), 2–99 (53), 0–128 (128)
61	Highest break	147
0	Century breaks	2
2	50+ breaks	5
