= 2013 Players Tour Championship Grand Final =

2013 Dafabet Players Tour Championship Grand Final

Tournament information
- Dates: 12–17 March 2013
- Venue: Bailey Allen Hall
- City: Galway
- Country: Ireland
- Organisation: World Snooker
- Format: Ranking event
- Total prize fund: £301,000
- Winner's share: £100,000
- Highest break: Ding Junhui (CHN) (147)

Final
- Champion: Ding Junhui (CHN)
- Runner-up: Neil Robertson (AUS)
- Score: 4–3

The 2013 Players Tour Championship Grand Final (officially the 2013 Dafabet Players Tour Championship Grand Final) was a professional ranking snooker tournament that took place between 12 and 17 March 2013 at the Bailey Allen Hall in Galway, Ireland. It was the ninth ranking event of the 2012/2013 season.

Stephen Lee was the defending champion, but he couldn't compete due to his suspension from professional snooker.

Ding Junhui won his sixth ranking title by defeating Neil Robertson 4–3 in the final. Ding also made the 97th official maximum break during his quarter-final match against Mark Allen. This was Ding's fifth 147 break and the ninth in the 2012/2013 season. This was the 250th ranking event to be staged in snooker.

== Prize fund and ranking points ==
The breakdown of prize money and ranking points of the event is shown below:

	Prize fund	Ranking points
Winner	£100,000	3,000
Runner-up	£40,000	2,400
Semi-finalist	£20,000	1,920
Quarter-finalist	£9,500	1,500
Last 16	£5,000	1,140
Last 32	£2,500	840
Highest break	£2,000	–
Maximum break	£1,000	–
Total	£301,000	–

== Seeding list ==
The players competed in 13 minor-ranking tournaments to earn points for the PTC and APTC Order of Merits. The seeding list of the Finals was based on the combined list from the earnings of both Order of Merits.

Rank	Player	PTC	APTC	Total points
1	Mark Selby (ENG)	34,900	0	34,900
2	Stuart Bingham (ENG)	4,950	20,600	25,550
3	Ding Junhui (CHN)	18,100	7,100	25,200
4	Judd Trump (ENG)	22,250	0	22,250
5	Stephen Maguire (SCO)	20,100	200	20,300
6	John Higgins (SCO)	19,150	0	19,150
7	Neil Robertson (AUS)	19,050	0	19,050
8	Rod Lawler (ENG)	16,400	0	16,400
9	Mark Allen (NIR)	16,050	0	16,050
10	Martin Gould (ENG)	15,950	0	15,950
11	Ben Woollaston (ENG)	11,300	2,500	13,800
12	Barry Hawkins (ENG)	9,550	1,500	11,050
13	Ken Doherty (IRL)	9,400	1,500	10,900
14	Graeme Dott (SCO)	10,500	0	10,500
15	Robert Milkins (ENG)	5,400	5,000	10,400
16	Marco Fu (HKG)	8,100	2,200	10,300
17	Mark Williams (WAL)	8,100	2,000	10,100
18	Andrew Higginson (ENG)	9,850	200	10,050
19	Jamie Burnett (SCO)	9,950	0	9,950
20	Jack Lisowski (ENG)	9,850	0	9,850
21	Anthony McGill (SCO)	9,400	0	9,400
22	Joe Perry (ENG)	8,300	1,000	9,300
23	Tom Ford (ENG)	4,700	4,500	9,200
24	Mark Davis (ENG)	7,550	1,200	8,750
25	Joe Swail (NIR)	8,600	0	8,600
26	Ali Carter (ENG)	8,550	0	8,550
27	Alfie Burden (ENG)	7,550	200	7,750
28	Kurt Maflin (NOR)	7,550	0	7,550
29	Xiao Guodong (CHN)	3,850	3,700	7,550
30	Mark Joyce (ENG)	7,400	0	7,400
31	Cao Yupeng (CHN)	2,050	4,200	6,250
32	Li Hang (CHN)	0	5,400	5,400

== Main draw ==
Last 32; Best of 7 frames
1	Mark Selby (ENG)	3
20	Jack Lisowski (ENG)	4
10	Martin Gould (ENG)	2
23	Tom Ford (ENG)	4
16	Marco Fu (HKG)	4
30	Mark Joyce (ENG)	2
6	John Higgins (SCO)	2
26	Ali Carter (ENG)	4
7	Neil Robertson (AUS)	4
19	Jamie Burnett (SCO)	2
12	Barry Hawkins (ENG)	4
32	Li Hang (CHN)	0
14	Graeme Dott (SCO)	1
29	Xiao Guodong (CHN)	4
4	Judd Trump (ENG)	3
27	Alfie Burden (ENG)	4
3	Ding Junhui (CHN)	4
18	Andrew Higginson (ENG)	3
15	Robert Milkins (ENG)	2
21	Anthony McGill (SCO)	4
9	Mark Allen (NIR)	4
24	Mark Davis (ENG)	0
5	Stephen Maguire (SCO)	3
25	Joe Swail (NIR)	4
8	Rod Lawler (ENG)	4
31	Cao Yupeng (CHN)	2
13	Ken Doherty (IRL)	2
28	Kurt Maflin (NOR)	4
11	Ben Woollaston (ENG)	4
17	Mark Williams (WAL)	3
2	Stuart Bingham (ENG)	2
22	Joe Perry (ENG)	4

Last 16; Best of 7 frames
20	(England) Jack Lisowski	3
23	(England) Tom Ford	4
16	(Hong Kong) Marco Fu	4
26	(England) Ali Carter	1
7	(Australia) Neil Robertson	4
12	(England) Barry Hawkins	1
29	(China) Xiao Guodong	4
27	(England) Alfie Burden	2
3	(China) Ding Junhui	4
21	(Scotland) Anthony McGill	3
9	(Northern Ireland) Mark Allen	4
25	(Northern Ireland) Joe Swail	0
8	(England) Rod Lawler	3
28	(Norway) Kurt Maflin	4
11	(England) Ben Woollaston	4
22	(England) Joe Perry	3

Quarter-finals; Best of 7 frames
23	(England) Tom Ford	4
16	(Hong Kong) Marco Fu	1
7	(Australia) Neil Robertson	4
29	(China) Xiao Guodong	1
3	(China) Ding Junhui	4
9	(Northern Ireland) Mark Allen	3
28	(Norway) Kurt Maflin	4
11	(England) Ben Woollaston	3

Semi-finals; Best of 7 frames
23	(England) Tom Ford	3
7	(Australia) Neil Robertson	4
3	(China) Ding Junhui	4
28	(Norway) Kurt Maflin	0

Final; Best of 7 frames
7	(Australia) Neil Robertson	3
3	(China) Ding Junhui	4

== Final ==
Final: Best of 7 frames. Referee: Michaela Tabb. Bailey Allen Hall, Galway, Ireland, 17 March 2013.
Neil Robertson (7); Australia	3–4	Ding Junhui (3); China
88–45 (88), 80–0 (58), 72–55 (60, 51), 0–122 (52, 70), 0–130 (130), 44–70, 7–98 (98)
88	Highest break	130
0	Century breaks	1
3	50+ breaks	5

== Century breaks ==
- 147, 138, 133, 130, 130, 118, 108, 101 – Ding Junhui
- 134 – Tom Ford
- 125 – Mark Allen
- 118 – John Higgins
- 113 – Alfie Burden
- 105 – Ken Doherty
- 104 – Marco Fu
- 100 – Martin Gould
- 100 – Barry Hawkins
