= Xiao Guodong =

Chinese snooker player (born 1989)

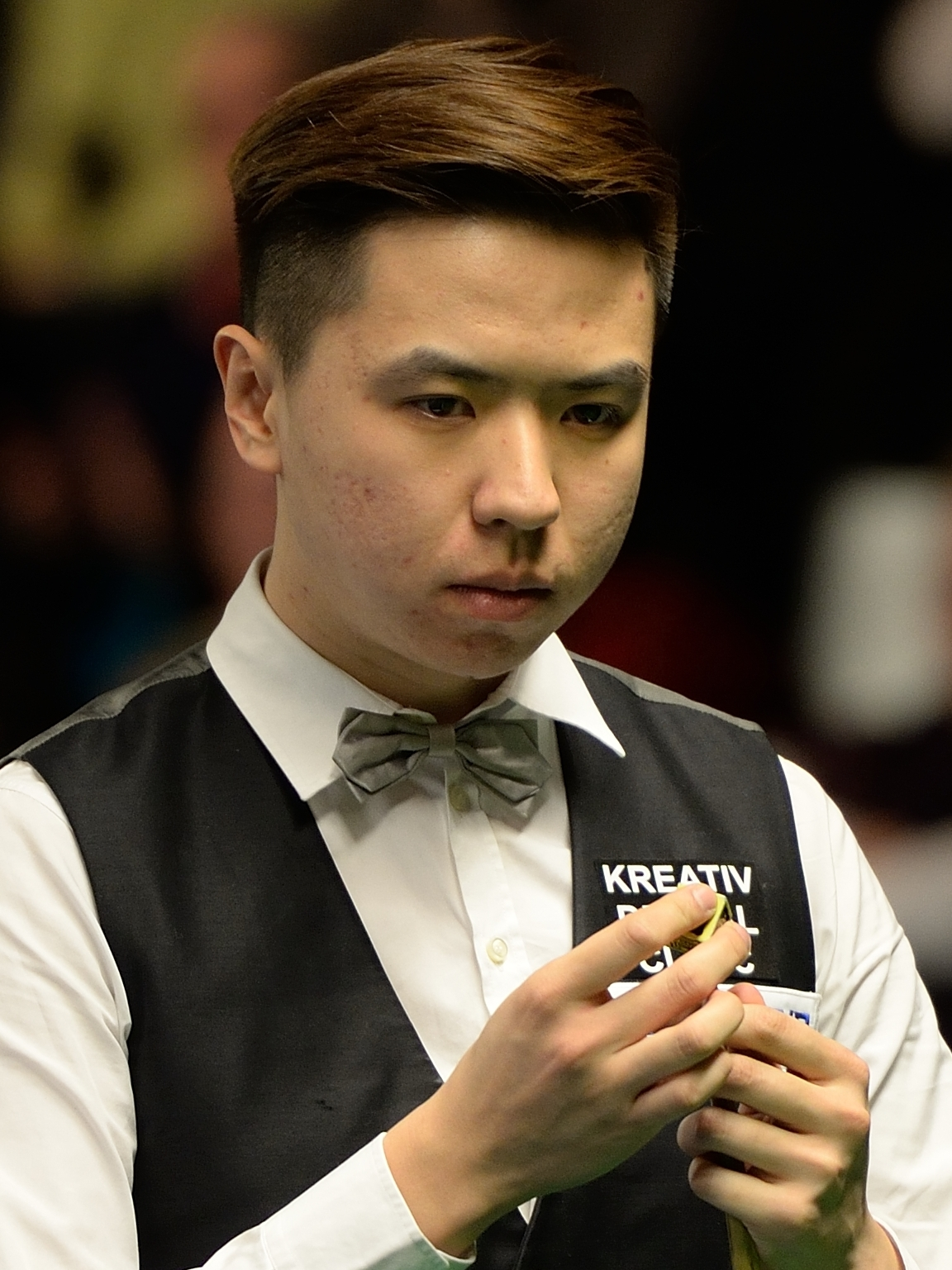
- Xiao at the 2015 German Masters

Personal information
- Nicknames: The Chongqing Cyberman; X-factor (until 2026)
- Born: 10 February 1989 (age 37) Yuzhong, Chongqing, China

Sport
- Country: China
- Sport: Snooker
- Professional: 2007/2008, 2009–present
- Highest ranking: 8 (August 2025)
- Current ranking: 14 (as of 7 November 2026)
- Maximum breaks: 4
- Century breaks: 367 (as of 19 November 2026)

Tournament wins
- Ranking: 2
Medal record
Representing China
Men's snooker
Asian Indoor Games
Bronze medal – third place	2007 Macau	Singles
Silver medal – second place	2007 Macau	Team
Gold medal – first place	2009 Ho Chi Minh City	Six-red singles
Asian Indoor and Martial Arts Games
Gold medal – first place	2013 Incheon	Six-red singles
World Games
Gold medal – first place	2025 Chengdu	Singles

Xiao Guodong
- Simplified Chinese: 肖国栋
- Traditional Chinese: 蕭國棟
Transcriptions
Standard Mandarin
- Hanyu Pinyin: Xiāo Guódòng
- IPA: [ɕjáʊ kwǒtʊ̂ŋ]
Yue: Cantonese
- Yale Romanization: Sīu Gwok Dung
- Jyutping: Siu¹ Gwok³ Dung³

Xiao Guodong (Chinese: 肖国栋; born 10 February 1989) is a Chinese professional snooker player who has won two ranking events. He turned professional in 2007 after winning the Asian Under-21 Championships. He won his first ranking event 17 years after first turning professional at the 2024 Wuhan Open, beating Si Jiahui 10–7 in only the third all-Chinese ranking event final. He also took part in the first ever all-Chinese ranking event final, when he lost 6–10 to Ding Junhui in the 2013 Shanghai Masters. In 2025, he retained his Wuhan Open title, defeating Gary Wilson 10‍–‍9 in the final, becoming only the fourth player in professional snooker history to defend their maiden ranking title, after John Parrott, Mark Allen and Wilson himself.

== Career ==
=== 2007–2010 ===
Xiao appeared as a wildcard in the 2007 China Open, and beat the then world number 50 Tom Ford 5–3, before losing 0–5 to Matthew Stevens.

In his first ranking tournament, the 2007 Grand Prix he finished 4th in his qualifying group by winning 3 out his 7 matches. In the 2007 Northern Ireland Trophy he beat Leo Fernandez 5-1 and Jimmy White 5–0, before he lost to David Gilbert 2–5.

He lost his first match in the 2007 UK Championship to Kurt Maflin and to the same player in the 2008 China Open qualifiers too. In the Welsh Open he lost to fellow Chinese player Liu Song 2–5.

A victory over Munraj Pal in the 2008 World Championship qualifiers set up a match with David Roe, which he lost 5–10.

Xiao won the Paul Hunter English Open in 2008.

In the 2009 China Open, he beat Michael Holt 5–3 in the wild-card round, progressing to the first round proper where he beat fellow Chinese player Ding Junhui 5–3. He gave three-time world champion Ronnie O'Sullivan a tough game in the next round as O'Sullivan began the match with two successive centuries before Xiao rallied to trail just 4–3, but lost the next frame to bow out of the tournament.

On 10 July 2009, on the World Snooker website, Xiao was voted in the Top 5 players to watch out for in the 2009–10 season.

=== 2011/2012 season ===
Xiao had a good season in the Players Tour Championship series of tournaments in the 2011–12 season. He reached the quarter-finals of Event 1 and Event 6 and went one better in Event 2, where he was knocked out in the last 4 against compatriot Ding Junhui. The results ensured he reached the 2012 Finals by finishing eighteenth in the Order of Merit. He played in the Finals against the advice of doctors as he had broken a bone in his hand three weeks earlier whilst sleeping on it awkwardly, but despite this beat Dominic Dale 4–2 in the first round of the event. Xiao then pulled off the result of his career to date by defeating recent UK champion, Judd Trump 4–2 to advance to his first ever ranking event quarter-final, where he was beaten by Andrew Higginson 1–4.

Xiao could not qualify for any of the other ranking events during the season, coming closest in the UK Championship, where he lost to Tom Ford in the final qualifying round. He finished the season ranked world number 41, meaning he had risen 23 places during the year.

=== 2012/2013 season ===
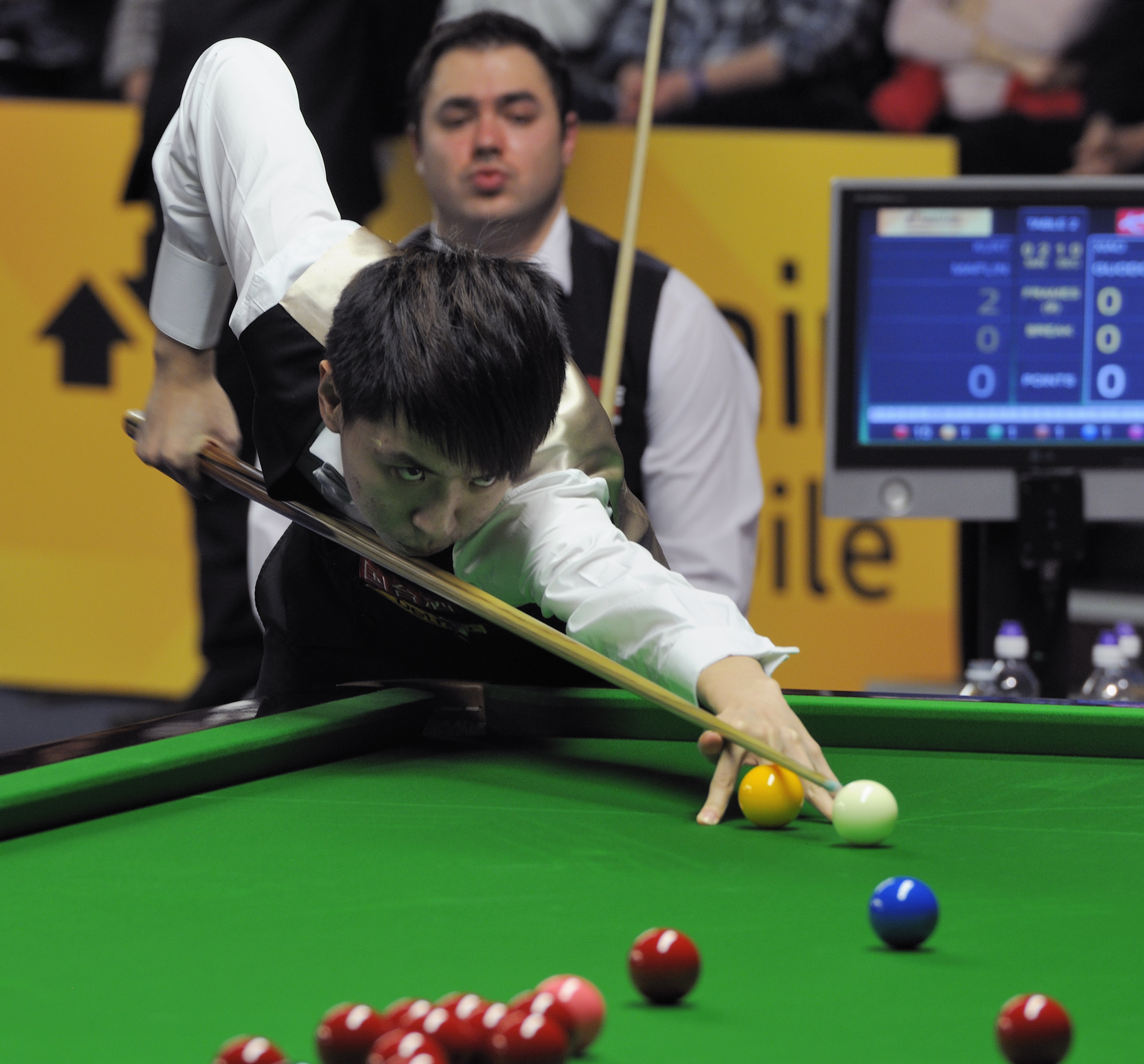
2013 German Masters

Xiao qualified for the Australian Goldfields Open and the German Masters during the 2012–13 season, losing in the first round in both to Barry Hawkins and Kurt Maflin respectively. He took advantage of the new Asian Players Tour Championship events by taking part in all three of them. He had his best result in the second event by defeating the likes of Marco Fu and Barry Hawkins to reach the semi-finals, where he lost 2–4 to Stephen Lee. His performances helped him to eighth on the Asian PTC Order of Merit, high enough to qualify for the Finals. There, Xiao reached the quarter-finals for the second successive year with wins over Graeme Dott and Alfie Burden, before losing 1–4 to Neil Robertson. Xiao's season came to an end when he lost 4–10 to Jimmy White in the third round of World Championship Qualifying, but he finished the year ranked world number 37, at the time his highest position.

=== 2013/2014 season ===
In his opening match of the season, Xiao defeated Andrew Norman 5–3 to qualify for the 2013 Wuxi Classic in China where he beat Peter Ebdon 5–3 in the first round and Li Hang 5–4 in the second. He then faced John Higgins in the last 16 and was whitewashed 0–5. Xiao could also not pick up a frame in the first round of the Australian Goldfields Open, as he lost 0–5 to Joe Perry. He won three matches to qualify for the Shanghai Masters and once there defeated Yuan Siyun 5–0 in the wildcard round. Xiao took advantage of a poor performance by Stephen Maguire in the first round to beat him 5–2 and then saw off Peter Lines 5–3. He continued his run to make the semi-finals of a ranking event for the first time as he came back from 4–2 down to beat Mark Davis 5–4 citing afterwards his work with Terry Griffiths as being a key factor in his success. In the semis he played Michael Holt who was also making his ranking event semi-final debut and from 3–3 Xiao made a break of 111, added the next frame and then closed the match out 6–3 with a 127 break. He played Ding Junhui in a first all-Chinese ranking final and was beaten 10–6, but the runner-up's cheque of £35,500 is the highest of his career to date and he also broke into the world's top 32 for the first time.

His second quarter-final appearance of the season came at the German Masters but he lost 5–2 to Ryan Day. Xiao's rise up the world rankings meant he only needed to win one match to reach the World Championship and he did so in emphatic fashion by thrashing Li Yan 10–1. In Xiao's debut in the event he rallied from 4–1 down against Ali Carter to end the first session 5–4 behind, but went on to lose 10–8. Xiao's rise up the rankings continued as he ended the campaign as the world number 23, an increase of 14 spots from the start of the season.

=== 2014/2015 season ===
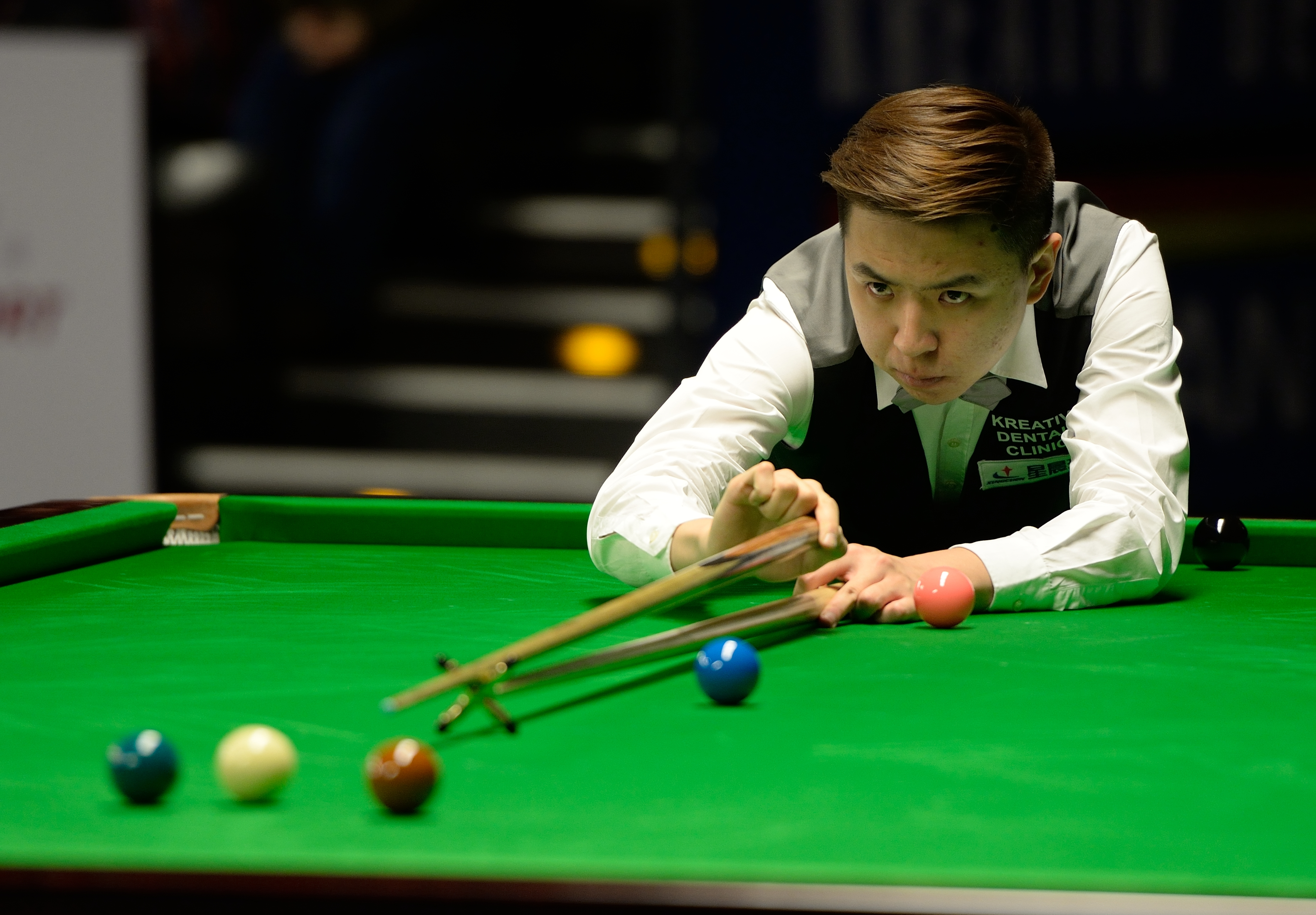
2015 German Masters

At the Australian Goldfields Open, Xiao recorded wins over Liam Highfield, Peter Ebdon and Matthew Stevens to reach the semi-finals of a ranking event for the second time, where Judd Trump defeated him 6–3. He beat Eden Sharav and Noppon Saengkham at the International Championship, but lost 6–4 to Robert Milkins in the third round and was knocked out by the same scoreline in the second round of the UK Championship against Matthew Selt. After edging Highfield 5–4 in the first round of the German Masters, Xiao was thrashed 5–0 by Neil Robertson. Xiao won five matches at the Shoot-Out, the tournament where every match is decided by one ten-minute frame, to reach the final. Xiao lost the lead with just six seconds remaining against Michael White. He progressed through to the final qualifying round of the World Championship and his match against Jimmy Robertson went into a deciding frame which Robertson won on the final pink.

=== 2015/2016 season ===
After having a high enough ranking to gain automatic entry into the Australian Goldfields Open (where he lost 5–3 to Ian Burns in the first round) Xiao's ranking steadily declined during the season as he could not get beyond the last 48 of any ranking event. He dropped 30 places to end it 51st in the world.

=== 2016/2017 season ===
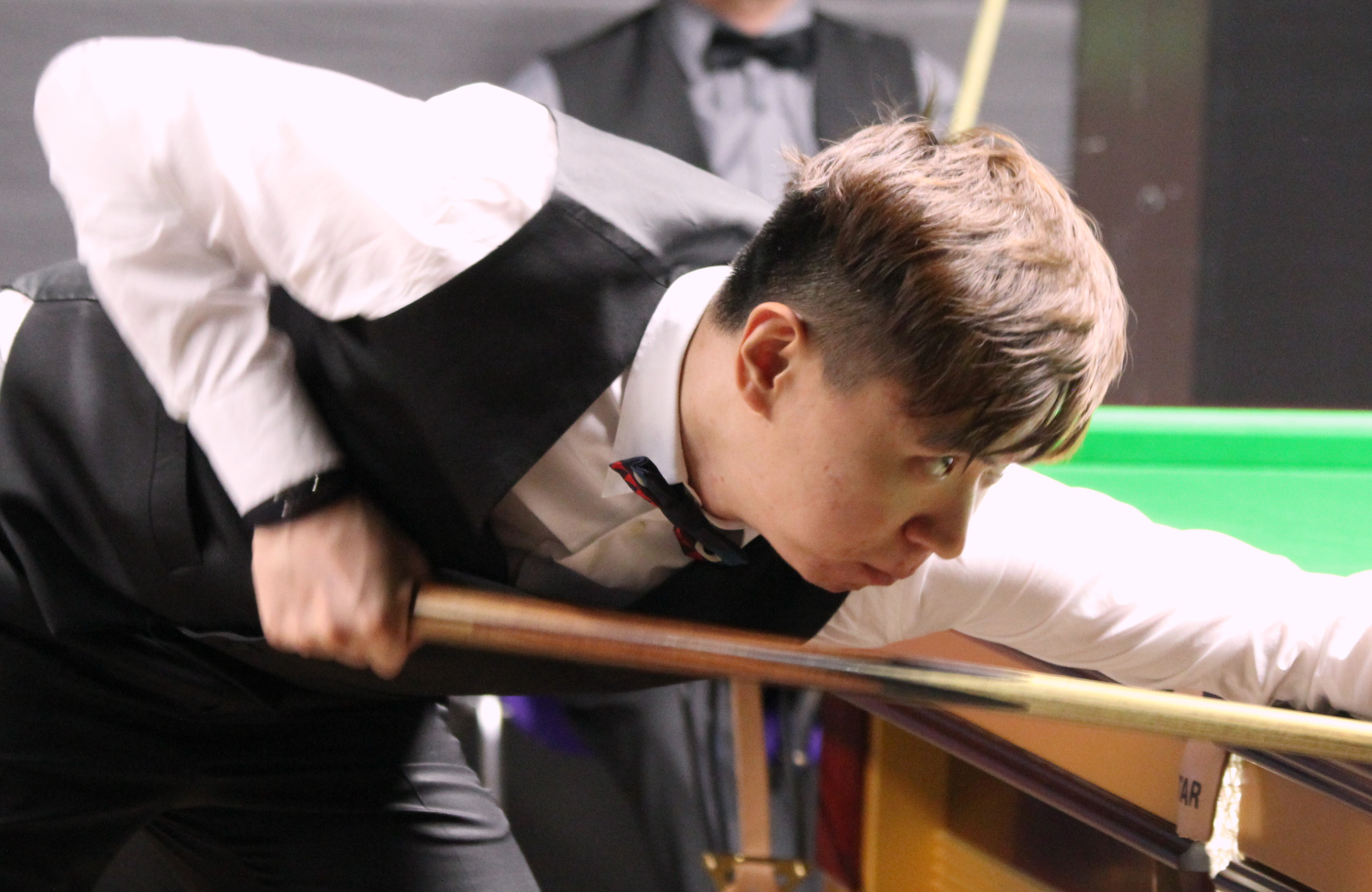
2016 Paul Hunter Classic

At the Riga Masters, Xiao beat Gareth Allen 4–0 and Jamie Jones and David Gilbert both 4–2 to reach his first ranking event quarter-final in two years. He lost 4–2 to Darren Morgan. Xiao defeated Michael Holt 4–1, Noppon Saengkham 4–0 and Neil Robertson 4–3 at the English Open, before being eliminated 4–3 by Chris Wakelin in the fourth round. During his second round match with Shaun Murphy at the Scottish Open, Xiao made a 132 break, the 100th century of his career and went on to win 4–1. He lost by a reversal of this scoreline to Mark Davis in the subsequent round. This was the first year that the Shoot-Out, the tournament where every match is settled by a 10-minute frame played under a shot clock, had its status upgraded to a ranking event. In his quarter-final match with David Gilbert, Xiao ran out of time when potting a yellow but the foul was not picked up by the referee. He won the match and reached the final of the event for the second time and lost by 67–19 points to Anthony McGill. Three comfortable victories saw Xiao qualify for the World Championship and he beat Ryan Day 10–4 in round one, before losing 13–6 to Mark Selby.

=== 2017/2018 season ===
Xiao reached three quarter-finals, but had victories over John Higgins, Mark Allen and Mark Selby (twice). He qualified for the World Championship, but lost to Ding Junhui 10–3. He finished the season ranked 39.

=== 2018/2019 season ===
Xiao missed two tournaments in August due to pneumonia. His best results came in the World Open (quarter final) and the World Grand Prix (semi-final). In the World Championship Qualifiers, he was unhappy when his opponent, Michael Judge played on for 20 minutes needing 8 snookers in the 8th frame. The session was duly suspended at 4-4, and Judge ultimately won 10–9. Xiao finished the season ranked 25.

=== 2019 to 2024 ===
From the start of the 2019-20 season, Xiao failed to reach the business end of most tournaments he entered, with only a single semi-final reached in the 2020 Gibraltar Open, which had been severely impacted due to the start of the COVID-19 pandemic. He did reach the quarter-final of the behind-closed-doors staging of the 2021 Gibraltar Open, but continued struggling for results in most events he was entering.

His results started to improve from the 2023 German Masters, in which he reached back-to-back quarter-finals of both that event and the following 2023 World Grand Prix. Although starting the 2023–24 snooker season as the world number 41, he began struggling for results again, with only one semi-final appearance at the 2023 British Open to show for his efforts, but the lack of events that had been played at this point meant he climbed to end the season as the world number 34.

=== 2024/25 season: First ranking title ===
The 2024–25 snooker season would prove to be significant in Xiao's career. At the inaugural Saudi Arabia Snooker Masters held near the start of the season, he reached the quarter-finals but lost to Shaun Murphy. In the 2024 Wuhan Open, he reached the main stages by beating Haydon Pinhey in qualifying 5–1, then proceeded to defeat Andrew Pagett, the then-reigning World Champion Kyren Wilson, Barry Hawkins, Shaun Murphy -- in a performance which included three back-to-back century breaks and restricting Murphy to just 21 points in the first four frames -- and Long Zehuang to reach the final of a ranking event for the first time since the 2017 Snooker Shoot Out. There, he met Si Jiahui who was making his second appearance in a ranking event final and who had made his maiden maximum break in the previous round. Although Si scored four century breaks in the final, the experience of Xiao over the seasons -- despite rarely reaching the final of tournaments -- prevailed as he defeated his compatriot 10–7 to win his first ever ranking title on the World Snooker Tour.

While the form that took Xiao to the title dried up over the next four tournaments with three first-round exits, his form returned in another event played in China: the 2024 International Championship, in which he defeated two former World Championship semi-finalists -- Ricky Walden and Mark Allen -- to reach the semi-finals, where he lost in a decider to Chris Wakelin.

His title victory in Wuhan permitted him to be invited to the 2024 Champion of Champions, an event which Xiao had never previously competed in. In the Group Semi-Finals, he faced four-time tournament winner Ronnie O'Sullivan: in the first three frames, Xiao failed to score a point as his opponent raced to a 3–0 lead. Despite losing the first three frames, Xiao hit back immediately by restricting O'Sullivan to just 7 points with three one-visit contributions which included a 130 century break, forcing a decider in which he won 4–3. In the Group Final that evening, he defeated another former World Champion in Mark Selby in his second consecutive decider 6–5, taking the decider with a contribution of 58. In the semi-finals, he proceeded to defeat Mark Allen 6–3, despite no century breaks being produced by either player in the match, to reach his first ever Champion of Champions final, doing so on his debut. His opponent in the final was three-time World Champion Mark Williams, but Xiao was unable to convert his chances and lost 10–6.

Xiao played in the 2024 UK Championship as a seeded player for the first time, but lost in the first round, which denied him an opportunity to make a debut at the 2025 Masters in January. Despite that, he reached back-to-back semi-finals at the 2024 Scottish Open, losing 6–4 to runner-up Wu Yize, and the 2025 German Masters, losing to the eventual champion Kyren Wilson.

He competed in the first Players Series event of the season, reaching the quarter-finals of the 2025 World Grand Prix -- which was being played in Hong Kong for the first time -- but lost to newly-crowned Scottish Open champion Lei Peifan. His success in the season meant he competed in the 2025 Players Championship and the 2025 Tour Championship: in both cases, he lost in the quarter-finals to John Higgins.

For the first time, Xiao was a Top 16 seed for the 2025 World Snooker Championship, having previously reached the Crucible Theatre three times as a qualifier. He won his first round match 10–4 by defeating Matthew Selt, reaching the second round for only the second time in his career. For the third time in just two months, Xiao faced John Higgins: despite lacking significant experience in competing in a best-of-25 frames match, he took Higgins all the way to a decider, but lost 13–12, ending the season as the world number 13 and securing his entry to the invitational 2025 Shanghai Masters in the new season as a seeded player.

=== 2025/26 season ===
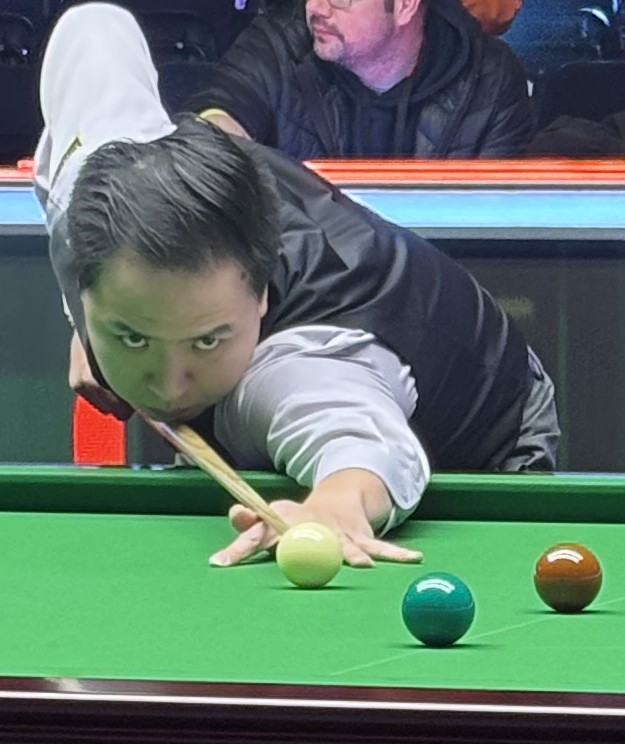
Xiao Guodong at the 2026 Masters

After reaching the quarter-finals of the Shanghai Masters, Xiao opted not to compete at the Saudi Arabia Masters in order to take part in the 2025 World Games, where he won gold in the men's snooker event. He entered the Wuhan Open as defending champion and retained his title with a 10–9 victory over Gary Wilson, claiming his second ranking title and rising to a career high of 8th in the world rankings.

== Performance and rankings timeline ==
Tournaments	2004/ 05	2006/ 07	2007/ 08	2008/ 09	2009/ 10	2010/ 11	2011/ 12	2012/ 13	2013/ 14	2014/ 15	2015/ 16	2016/ 17	2017/ 18	2018/ 19	2019/ 20	2020/ 21	2021/ 22	2022/ 23	2023/ 24	2024/ 25	2025/ 26	2026/ 27
Rankings (Note: It shows the ranking at the beginning of the season)	(Note: He was an amateur)		(Note: New players on the Main Tour don't have a ranking)			74	64	41	37	23	21	51	39	25	25	31	29	38	41	34	13	11
Ranking tournaments
Championship League	Not Held		Non-Ranking Event													2R	A	3R	3R	A	A	A
China Open	1R	LQ	2R	LQ	LQ	LQ	LQ	2R	LQ	LQ	LQ	1R	2R	1R	Tournament Not Held							2R
Wuhan Open	Tournament Not Held																		3R	W	W	SF
British Open	A	Tournament Not Held															1R	2R	SF	1R	3R	1R
English Open	Tournament Not Held											4R	4R	1R	4R	1R	1R	LQ	1R	1R	2R	1R
Shenzhen Open (Note: The event was called the Xi'an Grand Prix (2024/2025–2025/2026))	Tournament Not Held																			2R	A	LQ
Northern Ireland Open	Tournament Not Held											1R	3R	3R	1R	2R	1R	3R	LQ	1R	A	1R
International Championship	Tournament Not Held							LQ	2R	3R	1R	1R	2R	2R	2R	Not Held			2R	SF	1R	LQ
UK Championship	A	A	LQ	A	LQ	LQ	LQ	LQ	3R	2R	2R	2R	4R	3R	2R	4R	3R	1R	LQ	1R	1R	
Shoot Out	Tournament Not Held					Non-Ranking Event						F	2R	2R	3R	3R	1R	2R	1R	2R	A	
Scottish Open	Tournament Not Held							MR	Not Held			3R	QF	1R	3R	1R	2R	3R	LQ	SF	2R	
German Masters	Tournament Not Held					LQ	LQ	1R	QF	2R	LQ	LQ	QF	2R	LQ	LQ	LQ	QF	1R	SF	QF	
Welsh Open	A	A	LQ	A	LQ	LQ	LQ	LQ	3R	2R	1R	1R	1R	1R	3R	3R	LQ	LQ	1R	A	2R	
World Grand Prix	Tournament Not Held									NR	DNQ	DNQ	QF	SF	2R	1R	DNQ	QF	1R	QF	SF	
Players Championship (Note: The event was called the Players Tour Championship Grand Final (2010/2011–2015/2016))	Tournament Not Held					DNQ	QF	QF	DNQ	DNQ	DNQ	DNQ	DNQ	DNQ	DNQ	DNQ	DNQ	DNQ	DNQ	QF	1R	
World Open (Note: The event was called the Grand Prix (2004/2005, 2006/2007–2009/2010))	A	A	LQ	A	LQ	LQ	LQ	LQ	1R	Not Held		2R	2R	QF	2R	Not Held			LQ	1R	2R	
Tour Championship	Tournament Not Held													DNQ	DNQ	DNQ	DNQ	DNQ	DNQ	QF	DNQ	
World Championship	A	A	LQ	A	LQ	LQ	LQ	LQ	1R	LQ	LQ	2R	1R	LQ	A	LQ	LQ	LQ	LQ	2R	2R	
Non-ranking tournaments
Shanghai Masters	Not Held		Ranking Event											1R	2R	Not Held			A	A	QF	2R
Champion of Champions	Tournament Not Held								A	A	A	A	A	A	A	A	A	A	A	F	1R	
The Masters	A	A	LQ	A	A	A	A	A	A	A	A	A	A	A	A	A	A	A	A	A	QF	
Championship League	Not Held		A	A	A	A	A	A	A	2R	A	A	A	RR	RR	A	RR	2R	RR	2R	RR	
Former ranking tournaments
Northern Ireland Trophy	NR	A	LQ	A	Tournament Not Held																	
Wuxi Classic (Note: The event ran under the name Jiangsu Classic (2008/2009–2009/2010))	Not Held			Non-Ranking Event				LQ	3R	1R	Tournament Not Held											
Australian Goldfields Open	Tournament Not Held						LQ	1R	1R	SF	1R	Tournament Not Held										
Shanghai Masters	Not Held		1R	WR	LQ	LQ	LQ	LQ	F	LQ	LQ	LQ	1R	Non-Ranking		Not Held			Non-Ranking Event			
Paul Hunter Classic (Note: The event was called the Fürth German Open (2006/2007))	Pro-am Event					Minor-Ranking Event						2R	A	2R	NR	Tournament Not Held						
Indian Open	Tournament Not Held								LQ	A	NH	2R	LQ	WD	Tournament Not Held							
Riga Masters (Note: The event was called the Riga Open (2014/2015–2015/2016))	Tournament Not Held									Minor-Rank		QF	1R	1R	2R	Tournament Not Held						
China Championship	Tournament Not Held											NR	1R	2R	2R	Tournament Not Held						
WST Pro Series	Tournament Not Held															3R	Tournament Not Held					
Turkish Masters	Tournament Not Held																1R	Tournament Not Held				
Gibraltar Open	Tournament Not Held										MR	A	A	A	SF	QF	2R	Tournament Not Held				
WST Classic	Tournament Not Held																	1R	Tournament Not Held			
European Masters (Note: The event was called the Malta Cup (2004/2005, 2006/2007–2007/2008))	A	A	NR	Tournament Not Held								A	LQ	WD	2R	2R	2R	2R	2R	Not Held		
Saudi Arabia Masters	Tournament Not Held																			QF	A	NH
Former non-ranking tournaments
Beijing International Challenge	Tournament Not Held				A	RR	Tournament Not Held															
Wuxi Classic	Not Held			A	A	1R	A	Ranking Event			Tournament Not Held											
World Grand Prix	Tournament Not Held									1R	Ranking Event											
Shoot Out	Tournament Not Held					A	1R	1R	2R	F	2R	Ranking Event										
Six-red World Championship (Note: The event was called the Six-red Snooker International (2008/2009) and the Six-red World Grand Prix (2009/2010))	Not Held			A	A	A	NH	A	A	A	A	A	A	A	A	Not Held		LQ	Tournament Not Held			
Haining Open	Tournament Not Held									Minor-Rank		3R	2R	A	A	NH	A	A	Tournament Not Held			

Performance Table Legend
LQ	lost in the qualifying draw	#R	lost in the early rounds of the tournament (WR = Wildcard round, RR = Round robin)	QF	lost in the quarter-finals
SF	lost in the semi-finals	F	lost in the final	W	won the tournament
DNQ	did not qualify for the tournament	A	did not participate in the tournament	WD	withdrew from the tournament

NH / Not Held	means an event was not held.
NR / Non-Ranking Event	means an event is/was no longer a ranking event.
R / Ranking Event	means an event is/was a ranking event.
MR / Minor-Ranking Event	means an event is/was a minor-ranking event.
PA / Pro-am Event	means an event is/was a pro-am event.

== Career finals ==
=== Ranking finals: 4 (2 titles) ===
Outcome	No.	Year	Championship	Opponent in the final	Score	Ref.
Runner-up	1.	2013	Shanghai Masters	(China) Ding Junhui	6–10	
Runner-up	2.	2017	Snooker Shoot Out	(Scotland) Anthony McGill	0–1	
Winner	1.	2024	Wuhan Open	(China) Si Jiahui	10–7	
Winner	2.	2025	Wuhan Open (2)	(England) Gary Wilson	10–9	

=== Non-ranking finals: 3 (1 title) ===
Legend
Champion of Champions (0–1)
Other (1–1)

Outcome	No.	Year	Championship	Opponent in the final	Score	Ref.
Runner-up	1.	2015	Snooker Shoot Out	(Wales) Michael White	0–1	
Runner-up	2.	2024	Champion of Champions	(Wales) Mark Williams	6–10	
Winner	1.	2025	World Games	(Cyprus) Michael Georgiou	2–1	

=== Pro-am finals: 3 (3 titles) ===
Outcome	No.	Year	Championship	Opponent in the final	Score
Winner	1.	2008	Paul Hunter English Open	(England) Ben Woollaston	6–2
Winner	2.	2009	Asian Indoor Games	(China) Liang Wenbo	5–2
Winner	3.	2013	Asian Indoor and Martial Arts Games	(Iran) Amir Sarkhosh	5–4

=== Amateur finals: 4 (4 titles) ===
Outcome	No.	Year	Championship	Opponent in the final	Score	Ref.
Winner	1.	2007	Asian Under-21 Amateur Championship	(Thailand) Chinnakrit Yoawansiri	6–2	
Winner	2.	2008	PIOS – Event 2	(Thailand) Noppadol Sangnil	6–5	
Winner	3.	2009	PIOS – Event 6	(England) Jack Lisowski	6–0	
Winner	4.	2011	China Snooker Tour Finals	(China) Chen Feilong	5–0	
