= Wuxi Sports Center =

Sports venue in Wuxi, China

Coordinates: 31°32′46″N 120°15′47″E

- Interactive map of Wuxi Sports Center
- Location: Wuxi, China
- Owner: Wuxi Government
- Capacity: 28,800
- Surface: Grass
- Public transit: 4 at Wuxi Sports Center

Construction
- Built: 5 March 1993
- Opened: October 1994
- Cost: 74 million RMB

Tenant
- Wuxi Wugo F.C.

The Wuxi Sports Centre Stadium (Simplified Chinese: 无锡市体育中心) is a multi-use stadium in Wuxi, China. It is currently used mostly for association football matches. The stadium has a capacity of 28,800.
