= Wuxi Classic =

Snooker tournament in Wuxi, China

Tournament information
- Venue: Wuxi City Sports Park Stadium
- Location: Wuxi
- Country: China
- Established: 2008
- Organisation(s): World Professional Billiards and Snooker Association
- Format: Ranking event
- Total prize fund: £478,000
- Final champion: (Australia) Neil Robertson

The Wuxi Classic was a professional snooker tournament held from 2008 to 2014 in the city of Wuxi, China. It was a ranking event from 2012 through 2014. For the 2015/16 season, World Snooker reduced the number of ranking events held in China, which saw the tournament replaced by the snooker World Cup, also held in Wuxi. The last champion was Neil Robertson, who won the event in 2013 and retained his title in 2014.

== History ==
The event was introduced in 2008 as the Jiangsu Classic and was the third Main Tour event held in China. The tournament was played on a round-robin basis, with semi-finals and a final. The event's name was changed to Wuxi Classic in 2010, and the round-robin stage was abandoned.

In 2012 the tournament became a ranking event, and the Chinese organisers signed a five-year contract with prize money starting at £400,000 and increasing to £450,000 by 2014. In 2013 the tournament became the first to use a new format, where every player started in the first round. It was staged at the Wuxi City Sports Park Stadium, Wuxi, China.

There were three maximum breaks in the history of the tournament. The first was compiled by Mark Selby against Joe Perry in the group stage of the 2009 event. In 2012 Stuart Bingham became the third player to compile a 147 break in a ranking final. In the qualifying stage of the 2013 event Neil Robertson made the third maximum break against Mohamed Khairy.

== Winners ==
Year	Winner	Runner-up	Final score	Season
Jiangsu Classic (non–ranking)
2008	(China) Ding Junhui	(England) Mark Selby	6–5	2008/09
2009	(Northern Ireland) Mark Allen	(China) Ding Junhui	6–0	2009/10
Wuxi Classic (non–ranking)
2010	(England) Shaun Murphy	(China) Ding Junhui	9–8	2010/11
2011	(England) Mark Selby	(England) Ali Carter	9–7	2011/12
Wuxi Classic (ranking)
2012	(England) Ricky Walden	(England) Stuart Bingham	10–4	2012/13
2013	(Australia) Neil Robertson	(Scotland) John Higgins	10–7	2013/14
2014	(Australia) Neil Robertson	(England) Joe Perry	10–9	2014/15

== See also ==
- Xuzhou Open, a minor-ranking event also held in Jiangsu Province
