= 2018–19 snooker world rankings =

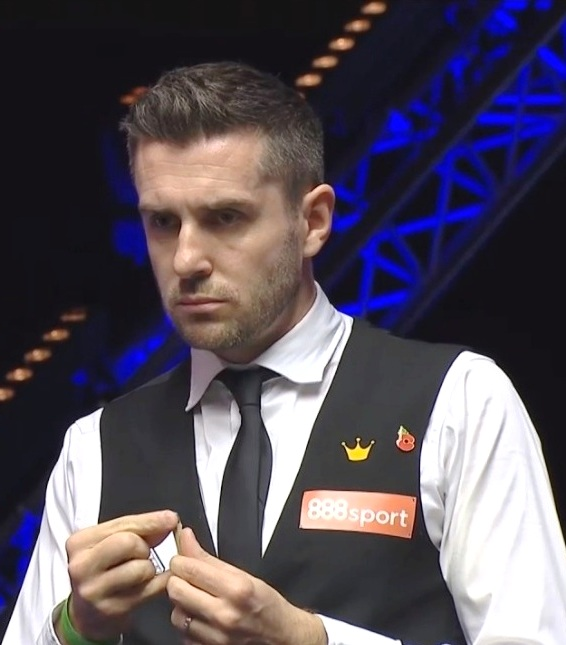
Mark Selby (pictured above) was ranked as the world number one at the start of the season, but Ronnie O'Sullivan (pictured below) ended the season as the best ranked player.

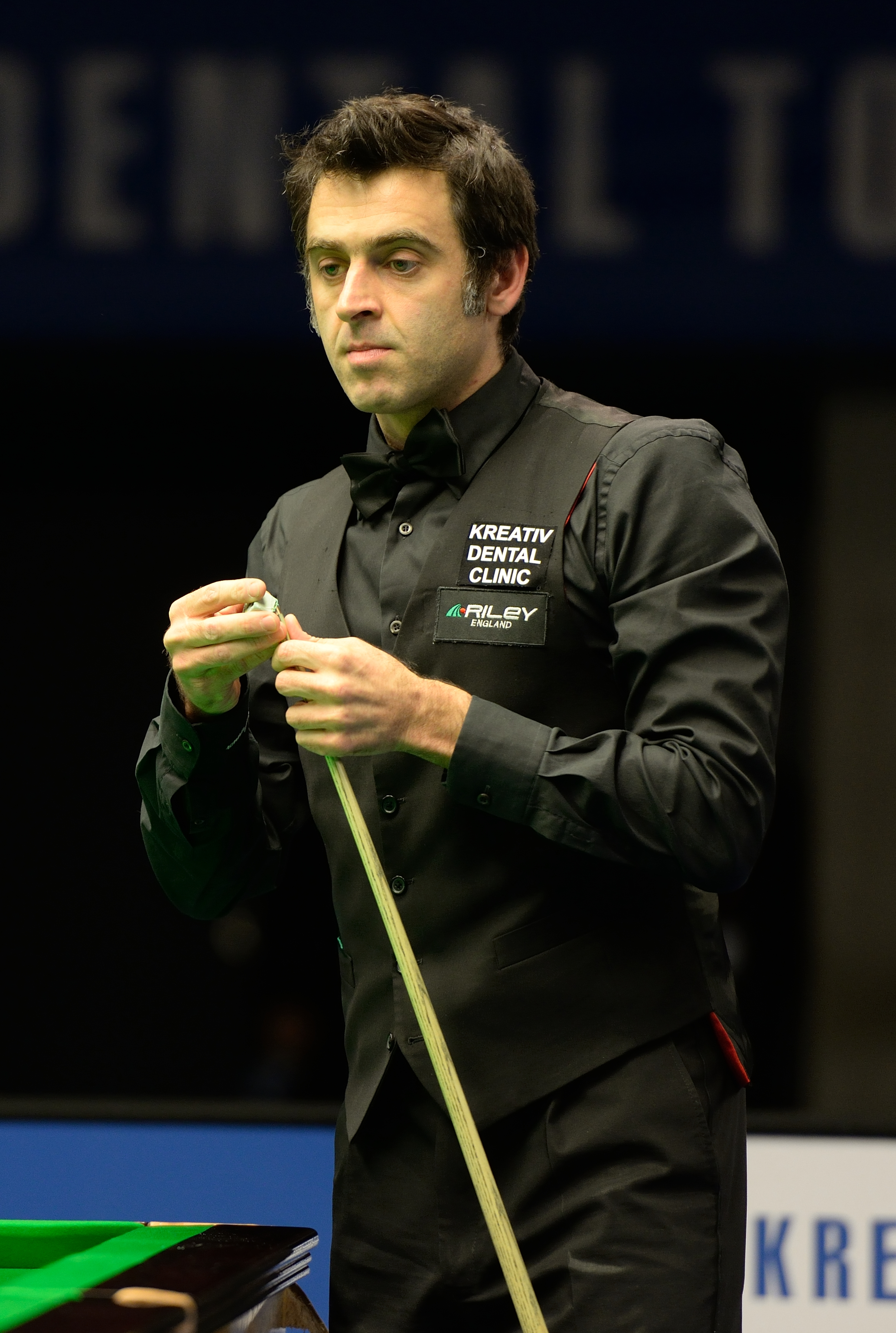

The sport of professional snooker has had a world ranking system in place since 1976. Certain tournaments were given "ranking" status, with the results at those events contributing to a player's world ranking. The events that made up the 1976–77 snooker season were the first to use a ranking points system. Originally, the world rankings were decided based only on results in the World Snooker Championship, but other events were later added. The system used for the 2018–19 snooker season was first used in the 2010–11 season, where players won ranking points based entirely on prize money won from these events. The rankings are based on the prior two seasons, with eleven revisions after specific tournaments throughout the season. These revisions are used as official rankings, with points awarded in the current season overwriting those from two years prior.

== Ranking list ==
=== Revision dates ===
Seedings for each event were based on the world rankings, with totals being updated at specific revision dates. On these dates, ranking points from the 2016–17 snooker season were removed from a player's total.

Revision dates
Revision point	Date	After	2016/2017 points dropped
1	30 July 2018	Riga Masters	Riga Masters
2	13 August 2018	World Open	World Open
3	1 October 2018	China Championship	Paul Hunter Classic; Indian Open; Shanghai Masters
4	8 October 2018	European Masters	European Masters
5	22 October 2018	English Open	English Open
6	19 November 2018	Northern Ireland Open	International Championship; Northern Ireland Open
7	10 December 2018	UK Championship	UK Championship
8	4 February 2019	German Masters	Scottish Open; German Masters
9	11 February 2019	World Grand Prix	World Grand Prix
10	8 April 2019	China Open	Welsh Open; Snooker Shoot Out; Players Championship; Gibraltar Open; China Open
11	7 May 2019	World Championship	World Championship

=== Seeding list ===
The following table contains the rankings which were used to determine the seedings for following tournaments. Other provisional and unofficial rankings are produced after each ranking event which are not noted here. Blank fields indicate that the player was not active on the tour, or had no ranking. The names are initially sorted by the scores at the end of the season.

Seeding list
Name	Revision 0 (Note: Seeding revision 0 was used for the seeding of the Riga Masters and World Open.)		Revision 1 (Note: Seeding revision 1 was used for the seeding of the Indian Open.)		Revision 2 (Note: Seeding revision 2 was used for the seeding of the China Championship, European Masters and Shanghai Masters.)		Revision 3 (Note: Seeding revision 3 was used for the seeding of the International Championship.)		Revision 4 (Note: Seeding revision 4 was used for the seeding of the English Open.)		Revision 5 (Note: Seeding revision 5 was used for the seeding of the Northern Ireland Open.)		Revision 6 (Note: Seeding revision 6 was used for the seeding of the UK Championship and the Scottish Open.)		Revision 7 (Note: Seeding revision 7 was used for the seeding of the Masters and the German Masters.)		Revision 8 (Note: Seeding revision 8 was used for the seeding of the Welsh Open and the China Open.)		Revision 9 (Note: Seeding revision 9 was used for the seeding of the Gibraltar Open.)		Revision 10 (Note: Seeding revision 10 was used for the seeding of the World Championship.)		Revision 11	
Name	Pos	Points	Pos	Points	Pos	Points	Pos	Points	Pos	Points	Pos	Points	Pos	Points	Pos	Points	Pos	Points	Pos	Points	Pos	Points	Pos	Points
Ronnie O'Sullivan	2	905,750	2	905,750	3	905,750	3	897,750	3	871,500	3	888,000	3	900,000	3	995,000	3	982,000	3	979,500	1	1,234,000	1	1,196,500
Judd Trump	5	660,250	5	655,750	5	657,250	5	669,250	5	617,000	5	593,000	5	654,500	5	664,500	5	673,000	4	765,500	7	666,500	2	1,166,500
Mark Williams	3	878,750	3	870,500	2	1,012,500	2	1,022,500	2	1,022,500	2	1,020,000	2	1,012,500	2	1,005,000	2	1,006,000	2	1,006,000	3	1,010,000	3	1,028,000
Neil Robertson	10	356,125	10	368,625	10	355,625	10	363,125	10	353,000	10	355,500	10	422,000	9	437,000	10	440,500	10	433,000	4	817,500	4	842,500
John Higgins	4	751,525	4	749,275	4	736,775	4	803,775	4	795,525	4	791,525	4	768,025	4	750,525	4	729,025	5	729,025	5	755,500	5	795,500
Mark Selby	1	1,315,275	1	1,314,750	1	1,321,250	1	1,417,500	1	1,410,375	1	1,410,375	1	1,326,875	1	1,156,875	1	1,158,125	1	1,165,625	2	1,097,225	6	752,225
Mark Allen	12	332,450	11	336,450	11	344,450	11	342,225	11	348,725	12	347,725	7	512,725	6	572,725	6	633,725	6	633,725	6	702,000	7	677,000
Kyren Wilson	9	416,250	9	422,250	9	428,750	9	427,225	9	433,225	9	429,725	11	413,725	10	436,225	8	514,725	7	522,225	8	548,725	8	561,225
Barry Hawkins	7	543,225	7	544,725	7	570,725	6	576,725	6	575,225	6	558,725	6	537,225	7	547,225	7	537,725	9	457,725	9	454,500	9	409,500
Ding Junhui	6	590,525	6	590,525	6	592,025	7	514,525	7	514,525	7	511,025	8	459,525	8	464,525	9	480,525	8	480,525	10	448,500	10	403,500
Jack Lisowski	26	180,862	24	204,812	21	224,812	22	229,412	22	239,100	21	242,600	17	272,100	16	287,100	16	292,100	15	297,100	11	406,600	11	398,600
David Gilbert	27	178,550	29	177,800	20	240,300	20	235,775	23	236,150	22	235,150	19	251,150	20	246,150	17	279,900	16	287,400	16	306,000	12	394,000
Stuart Bingham	13	324,587	13	322,337	12	315,837	15	297,312	15	300,000	11	350,000	14	324,000	12	354,000	12	344,000	12	346,500	12	385,500	13	390,500
Shaun Murphy	8	453,875	8	456,875	8	444,375	8	443,875	8	441,250	8	442,250	9	424,750	11	389,750	11	419,750	11	412,250	13	370,000	14	375,000
Luca Brecel	15	310,150	15	311,125	13	315,125	12	320,125	12	323,500	13	326,000	13	324,500	15	312,000	15	315,500	14	315,500	14	366,600	15	350,600
Stephen Maguire	17	291,025	16	306,025	14	310,025	16	285,525	16	285,525	15	303,025	15	304,525	14	312,025	13	325,525	13	328,025	15	333,500	16	346,000
Ali Carter	11	333,525	12	334,275	19	252,275	19	243,375	21	244,750	18	251,250	18	266,750	18	266,750	19	244,000	18	276,500	19	258,000	17	308,000
Ryan Day	16	303,862	17	304,837	15	304,837	14	297,812	13	307,500	14	311,500	12	326,000	13	316,000	14	320,000	17	285,000	17	285,000	18	295,000
Joe Perry	20	237,950	20	241,425	25	214,425	25	221,400	18	256,400	17	256,400	21	243,900	19	256,400	18	259,900	19	252,400	18	270,000	19	282,000
Gary Wilson	40	124,887	41	124,362	35	140,362	35	141,937	35	144,625	37	144,625	38	138,125	36	148,125	34	147,125	34	152,125	32	158,600	20	242,600
Yan Bingtao	23	215,125	23	214,375	22	222,375	21	233,150	24	233,525	23	230,025	22	230,525	22	230,525	22	231,525	23	231,525	20	237,000	21	236,000
Graeme Dott	22	219,175	22	224,125	24	217,625	24	228,625	25	226,000	24	226,000	23	223,000	23	228,000	21	234,500	20	234,500	21	233,500	22	228,500
Anthony McGill	14	320,300	14	317,300	16	304,800	18	252,275	19	250,025	19	251,025	20	247,525	21	242,525	20	240,025	22	232,525	24	203,000	23	223,000
Jimmy Robertson	34	148,587	35	146,337	36	139,837	36	136,562	26	210,250	25	212,750	24	212,750	25	207,750	23	215,250	24	220,250	22	228,725	24	222,725
Xiao Guodong	25	191,025	26	188,025	26	201,525	26	204,100	27	204,100	26	198,100	25	206,100	24	211,100	24	212,600	21	232,600	23	218,100	25	203,100
Lyu Haotian	61	94,000	61	94,000	59	98,000	41	130,000	40	130,000	42	130,000	41	130,000	40	130,000	40	132,500	40	132,500	27	175,500	26	190,500
Tom Ford	32	159,775	32	159,250	33	156,750	31	156,250	34	151,750	36	145,750	36	148,250	28	183,250	27	178,750	27	181,250	25	187,225	27	186,225
Mark King	21	221,050	21	224,525	23	220,525	23	229,000	20	246,500	20	247,500	28	184,500	26	194,500	26	193,750	26	186,250	26	180,725	28	178,725
Li Hang	36	136,450	36	138,400	37	138,400	38	135,500	37	138,500	38	136,000	37	139,000	38	144,000	36	144,500	36	144,500	28	168,000	29	176,000
Ricky Walden	28	177,975	27	183,975	28	190,475	27	187,575	29	189,075	29	185,075	30	169,575	33	159,575	33	156,325	35	151,325	30	163,600	30	173,600
Zhou Yuelong	33	159,450	31	159,900	32	157,400	32	155,400	32	159,400	32	162,900	32	161,900	34	156,900	30	164,400	31	159,400	35	155,500	31	169,500
Martin Gould	24	194,050	25	193,000	27	193,000	29	181,000	30	181,000	30	181,000	26	190,500	27	190,500	28	178,500	28	171,000	29	165,000	32	169,000
Mark Davis	41	124,500	40	127,975	42	127,975	43	127,700	45	123,450	34	150,950	33	155,950	35	155,950	35	146,950	32	154,450	38	151,725	33	163,725
Matthew Selt	59	94,900	60	94,900	57	99,900	59	95,500	59	95,500	59	96,500	60	96,500	54	101,500	51	103,000	51	103,000	34	156,100	34	163,100
Scott Donaldson	58	95,025	57	98,025	55	102,025	49	113,000	49	111,500	52	109,000	53	106,500	50	106,500	48	106,500	48	106,500	39	149,500	35	161,500
Robert Milkins	35	148,025	33	149,525	31	162,525	33	155,125	33	155,125	33	161,125	29	169,625	30	164,625	31	160,625	30	160,625	41	144,600	36	159,600
Thepchaiya Un-Nooh	56	98,000	58	98,000	63	81,000	63	78,225	64	81,225	63	84,725	58	98,725	53	103,725	56	100,725	54	100,725	43	137,725	37	157,725
Noppon Saengkham	52	102,650	53	102,125	40	134,625	34	143,125	36	143,125	35	150,625	34	154,625	32	159,625	32	157,625	29	165,125	31	162,600	38	156,600
Ben Woollaston	37	135,275	37	136,775	39	136,775	40	131,375	42	128,750	44	126,250	40	130,250	44	125,250	41	125,500	43	125,500	37	152,600	39	155,600
Hossein Vafaei	45	114,000	46	114,000	48	114,000	44	127,000	41	130,000	40	132,500	39	131,000	39	141,000	38	138,500	37	138,500	36	153,500	40	151,500
Liang Wenbo	19	258,900	19	261,900	18	255,400	17	261,500	17	263,000	27	195,500	27	185,000	29	180,000	29	173,000	33	153,000	33	158,500	41	148,500
Martin O'Donnell	67	46,100	67	46,100	67	50,100	65	70,100	65	70,100	66	70,100	59	97,600	46	120,100	43	122,600	42	127,600	47	131,100	42	146,100
Matthew Stevens	47	107,587	49	105,337	53	105,337	57	98,812	58	97,500	56	101,000	42	129,500	47	119,500	42	125,500	41	130,500	48	124,000	43	139,000
Michael Holt	31	163,050	34	147,300	34	148,800	37	135,900	38	133,275	39	133,275	46	125,275	43	125,275	45	121,525	46	116,525	42	138,000	44	136,000
Michael White	29	175,625	28	178,625	30	174,625	30	165,900	31	165,900	31	163,400	35	151,900	37	146,900	37	143,900	39	136,400	46	133,500	45	131,500
Michael Georgiou	49	105,737	50	105,212	51	109,212	53	105,412	53	107,100	53	107,100	51	108,600	59	98,600	53	102,600	52	102,600	52	110,600	46	130,600
Peter Ebdon	55	101,712	55	101,712	56	101,712	52	106,712	52	108,400	49	110,900	48	117,400	45	122,400	44	121,900	44	121,900	45	135,000	47	129,000
Chris Wakelin	48	106,300	48	111,775	46	115,775	46	118,975	46	121,975	47	114,475	49	114,475	49	114,475	47	113,975	47	113,975	49	123,950	48	125,950
Kurt Maflin	44	116,837	43	118,337	47	114,337	50	112,037	50	110,725	50	110,725	54	104,225	52	104,225	49	105,725	49	105,725	53	109,700	49	124,700
Stuart Carrington	50	104,075	44	118,025	44	118,025	51	111,500	48	114,500	48	113,500	45	125,500	42	125,500	39	133,000	38	138,000	44	136,500	50	120,500
Alan McManus	64	86,900	64	86,900	64	78,900	64	78,000	63	82,000	64	83,000	64	87,000	63	92,000	61	94,500	62	94,500	50	118,500	51	120,500
Sunny Akani	66	60,000	66	60,000	65	64,000	66	68,000	66	68,000	65	70,500	65	86,500	55	101,500	50	104,500	50	104,500	56	105,500	52	115,500
Yuan Sijun	71	28,000	74	28,000	70	32,000	68	52,000	68	55,000	68	58,500	67	74,500	68	74,500	64	83,000	61	95,500	51	113,000	53	113,000
Mark Joyce	42	121,837	42	121,837	43	125,837	45	126,312	44	125,000	45	125,000	47	118,000	48	118,000	46	117,500	45	117,500	54	109,000	54	111,000
Marco Fu	18	282,150	18	284,625	17	300,625	13	301,625	14	302,000	16	302,000	16	301,000	17	276,000	25	205,500	25	193,000	40	148,000	55	110,500
Ken Doherty	65	61,000	65	61,000	66	61,000	67	65,000	67	68,000	67	68,000	68	72,000	67	77,000	66	80,000	65	80,000	58	96,500	56	106,500
Andrew Higginson	54	102,525	54	102,000	52	106,000	56	100,100	57	99,600	57	97,100	56	100,600	56	100,600	58	99,100	56	99,100	55	108,600	57	100,600
Daniel Wells	63	89,212	63	89,212	62	81,212	62	84,212	62	82,900	62	86,400	66	81,900	66	81,900	59	98,400	57	98,400	62	93,500	58	100,500
Zhao Xintong			96	4,000	95	8,000	71	40,000	70	43,000	70	45,500	69	54,000	69	54,000	67	60,500	67	65,500	67	80,500	59	100,500
Robbie Williams	57	97,325	56	98,825	58	98,825	60	92,100	60	92,100	60	92,100	62	90,600	64	85,600	63	86,600	64	86,600	57	97,600	60	99,600
Liam Highfield	60	94,325	59	95,825	60	95,825	58	97,100	56	100,100	58	96,600	55	103,100	61	93,100	62	89,100	63	89,100	63	92,600	61	94,600
Anthony Hamilton	30	166,425	30	170,425	29	183,425	28	183,900	28	201,400	28	191,400	31	164,400	31	164,400	55	100,900	60	95,900	65	91,500	62	93,500
Fergal O'Brien	51	102,987	51	103,437	50	112,437	47	118,012	47	120,700	46	117,200	50	109,700	58	99,700	54	101,200	53	101,200	59	95,200	63	89,200
Mike Dunn	53	102,525	52	102,525	54	102,525	55	104,525	54	104,525	54	104,525	57	100,525	57	100,525	57	99,525	55	99,525	60	94,500	64	86,500
Dominic Dale	46	113,125	47	113,125	45	117,125	54	105,225	55	102,600	55	102,600	63	89,600	65	84,600	65	81,100	66	76,100	66	84,600	65	82,600
Jamie Jones	39	127,587	39	129,537	38	137,537	39	133,637	39	132,325	41	132,325	43	128,325	51	105,825	52	102,825	58	97,825	61	93,600	66	81,600
Eden Sharav	85	13,500	85	13,500	86	13,500	89	14,100	87	18,100	79	24,100	70	52,600	70	52,600	68	58,100	68	58,100	68	64,600	67	79,600
Lu Ning			109	0	115	0	116	1,000	118	1,000	121	1,000	113	7,000	89	22,000	85	28,500	85	28,500	72	62,500	68	77,500
Gerard Greene	68	36,500	68	38,000	68	38,000	69	42,600	71	42,600	71	42,600	72	45,100	73	45,100	70	50,600	70	50,600	69	63,600	69	73,600
Ian Burns	73	27,000	73	28,500	74	28,500	75	29,100	76	29,100	76	31,600	73	42,600	72	47,600	69	53,600	69	53,600	70	63,100	70	73,100
Rory McLeod	62	89,387	62	89,837	61	93,837	61	88,312	61	90,000	61	90,000	61	92,500	62	92,500	60	96,500	59	96,500	64	91,500	71	66,500
Sam Craigie			106	1,500	112	1,500	104	5,500	101	8,500	100	11,000	99	13,500	104	13,500	100	16,500	100	16,500	73	53,000	72	63,000
Alexander Ursenbacher	69	33,100	69	33,100	69	37,100	70	41,700	69	44,700	69	47,200	71	49,700	71	49,700	71	49,700	71	49,700	71	62,700	73	62,700
Tian Pengfei			103	1,500	110	1,500	115	1,500	93	12,500	95	12,500	92	19,000	79	29,000	77	35,000	77	35,000	81	41,000	74	61,000
Joe O'Connor			99	3,000	107	3,000	109	4,000	113	4,000	116	4,000	120	4,000	103	14,000	103	14,000	103	14,000	76	45,000	75	60,000
Duane Jones	79	20,000	79	20,000	79	20,000	81	20,000	81	23,000	82	23,000	84	23,000	87	23,000	72	43,000	72	43,000	74	48,500	76	58,500
Xu Si	74 (Note: Start ranking released by World Snooker does not match with the points at the end of last season.)	29,500	71	31,000	72	31,000	72	35,000	72	35,000	72	37,500	75	37,500	75	37,500	76	37,500	76	37,500	77	45,000	77	55,000
Mei Xiwen			105	1,500	93	9,500	84	17,000	89	17,000	84	20,500	85	23,000	82	28,000	86	28,000	86	28,000	78	44,000	78	54,000
Jimmy White	72	27,500	72	29,000	73	29,000	76	29,000	77	29,000	77	31,500	77	35,500	77	35,500	75	38,500	75	38,500	79	43,500	79	53,500
Zhang Yong	70	27,000	70	31,000	71	31,000	73	32,000	73	35,000	73	37,500	76	37,500	76	37,500	73	41,000	73	41,000	80	43,000	80	53,000
Luo Honghao			112	0	117	0	110	4,000	105	7,000	90	17,000	83	23,500	80	28,500	80	31,500	80	31,500	92	31,500	81	51,500
Nigel Bond	80	17,600	80	19,100	80	19,100	80	23,100	80	23,100	78	25,600	79	28,100	81	28,100	79	31,600	79	31,600	82	40,600	82	50,600
Peter Lines	75	23,725	75	25,225	75	25,225	74	29,725	74	33,725	74	33,725	74	40,225	74	40,225	74	40,225	74	40,225	75	47,725	83	47,725
Rod Lawler	94	5,600	93	7,100	90	11,100	93	12,100	95	12,100	98	12,100	101	12,100	97	17,100	99	17,100	99	17,100	83	40,600	84	40,600
Sam Baird			127	0	127	0	118	1,000	120	1,000	118	3,500	105	10,000	101	15,000	84	29,000	84	29,000	84	40,000	85	40,000
Craig Steadman			97	4,000	101	4,000	105	5,000	100	9,000	96	12,500	96	16,500	100	16,500	96	19,500	96	19,500	85	38,500	86	38,500
John Astley			128	0	128	0	111	4,000	114	4,000	117	4,000	111	8,000	113	8,000	109	11,000	109	11,000	102	22,000	87	37,000
Zhang Anda			124	0	104	4,000	88	14,500	82	20,500	83	20,500	81	27,000	84	27,000	81	30,500	81	30,500	86	35,000	88	35,000
Joe Swail	91	8,500	89	11,500	89	11,500	92	12,100	94	12,100	97	12,100	97	15,600	93	20,600	89	26,100	89	26,100	87	34,600	89	34,600
Robin Hull	76	22,500	76	24,000	76	24,000	78	24,000	78	24,000	80	24,000	80	27,500	83	27,500	82	30,000	82	30,000	88	34,500	90	34,500
Allan Taylor	78	20,750	78	20,750	78	20,750	77	25,350	75	29,350	75	31,850	78	31,850	78	31,850	78	31,850	78	31,850	89	32,850	91	32,850
Paul Davison	87	12,500	87	12,500	83	16,500	85	16,500	83	19,500	85	19,500	89	19,500	85	24,500	88	27,000	88	27,000	90	32,500	92	32,500
Jak Jones			120	0	97	8,000	99	8,000	96	12,000	99	12,000	102	12,000	88	22,000	87	27,500	87	27,500	91	32,000	93	32,000
Elliot Slessor			125	0	105	4,000	108	4,000	103	8,000	102	10,500	104	10,500	107	10,500	104	13,000	104	13,000	93	31,000	94	31,000
Ross Muir	90	10,000	91	10,000	92	10,000	94	10,600	90	16,600	91	16,600	90	19,100	94	19,100	90	25,600	90	25,600	94	30,600	95	30,600
Alfie Burden			104	1,500	111	1,500	113	2,500	110	5,500	112	5,500	93	19,000	96	19,000	83	29,000	83	29,000	95	29,000	96	29,000
Li Yuan	77	22,500	77	24,000	77	24,000	79	24,000	79	24,000	81	24,000	82	24,000	86	24,000	91	24,000	91	24,000	96	26,000	97	26,000
Oliver Lines			98	3,000	106	3,000	112	3,000	108	6,000	104	8,500	107	8,500	109	8,500	107	11,500	107	11,500	97	26,000	98	26,000
Billy Joe Castle	88	11,500	88	11,500	88	11,500	90	13,225	91	13,225	93	13,225	94	16,725	98	16,725	95	20,225	95	20,225	98	24,725	99	24,725
Chris Totten	84	14,500	84	14,500	85	14,500	87	14,500	88	17,500	89	17,500	86	21,000	90	21,000	92	24,000	92	24,000	99	24,000	100	24,000
Niu Zhuang	83	16,000	82	17,500	82	17,500	83	18,100	86	18,100	88	18,100	88	20,600	92	20,600	93	23,600	93	23,600	100	23,600	101	23,600
Chen Zifan	81	17,500	81	17,500	81	17,500	82	18,100	85	18,100	87	18,100	87	20,600	91	20,600	94	20,600	94	20,600	101	22,100	102	22,100
Soheil Vahedi	86	12,500	86	12,500	87	12,500	91	12,500	92	12,500	94	12,500	100	12,500	105	12,500	101	15,000	101	15,000	103	21,500	103	21,500
Jordan Brown			114	0	119	0	117	1,000	119	1,000	114	4,500	109	8,500	111	8,500	106	11,500	106	11,500	114	11,500	104	21,500
Lee Walker			102	1,500	99	5,500	97	8,500	97	11,500	92	14,000	95	16,500	99	16,500	98	19,000	98	19,000	104	21,000	105	21,000
Ashley Hugill	82	16,000	83	16,000	84	16,000	86	16,000	84	19,000	86	19,000	91	19,000	95	19,000	97	19,000	97	19,000	105	20,500	106	20,500
Hamza Akbar	89	10,500	90	10,500	91	10,500	95	10,500	98	10,500	101	10,500	98	14,000	102	14,000	102	14,000	102	14,000	106	19,000	107	19,000
Ashley Carty			100	3,000	108	3,000	100	7,000	104	7,000	107	7,000	112	7,000	115	7,000	113	9,500	113	9,500	107	18,000	108	18,000
James Wattana			126	0	126	0	128	0	127	0	127	0	122	4,000	123	4,000	119	4,000	119	4,000	108	17,500	109	17,500
Thor Chuan Leong			123	0	125	0	127	0	115	4,000	109	6,500	115	6,500	117	6,500	115	6,500	115	6,500	109	16,500	110	16,500
Lukas Kleckers	96	2,000	95	5,000	100	5,000	103	5,600	109	5,600	105	8,100	110	8,100	112	8,100	108	11,100	108	11,100	110	15,600	111	15,600
Jamie Clarke			119	0	122	0	125	0	125	0	126	0	127	0	127	0	125	0	125	0	111	15,500	112	15,500
Zhang Jiankang			115	0	120	0	119	600	116	3,600	110	6,100	116	6,100	118	6,100	112	9,600	112	9,600	112	13,600	113	13,600
Sanderson Lam	92	8,000	92	8,000	94	8,000	98	8,000	102	8,000	106	8,000	103	11,500	106	11,500	105	11,500	105	11,500	113	11,500	114	11,500
Sean O'Sullivan	93	6,000	94	6,000	98	6,000	102	6,000	107	6,000	111	6,000	108	8,500	110	8,500	114	8,500	114	8,500	115	11,000	115	11,000
Chen Feilong			110	0	116	0	123	0	123	0	124	0	125	2,500	114	7,500	110	10,000	110	10,000	116	10,500	116	10,500
Harvey Chandler			111	0	96	8,000	96	9,725	99	9,725	103	9,725	106	9,725	108	9,725	111	9,725	111	9,725	117	9,725	117	9,725
Kishan Hirani			117	0	121	0	120	600	121	600	122	600	123	3,100	124	3,100	122	3,100	122	3,100	118	8,600	118	8,600
Hammad Miah			122	0	124	0	114	1,725	117	1,725	120	1,725	117	5,225	119	5,225	117	5,225	117	5,225	119	7,725	119	7,725
Adam Stefanów			121	0	123	0	126	0	126	0	119	2,500	124	2,500	125	2,500	123	2,500	123	2,500	120	7,500	120	7,500
Rhys Clark	95	2,500	101	2,500	109	2,500	101	6,500	106	6,500	108	6,500	114	6,500	116	6,500	116	6,500	116	6,500	121	6,500	121	6,500
Andy Lee			116	0	102	4,000	107	4,000	112	4,000	115	4,000	119	4,000	121	4,000	121	4,000	121	4,000	122	6,500	122	6,500
Fan Zhengyi			113	0	118	0	124	0	124	0	125	0	121	4,000	122	4,000	120	4,000	120	4,000	123	5,500	123	5,500
Simon Lichtenberg			118	0	103	4,000	106	4,600	111	4,600	113	4,600	118	4,600	120	4,600	118	4,600	118	4,600	124	4,600	124	4,600
Basem Eltahhan	97	500	107	500	113	500	121	500	122	500	123	500	126	500	126	500	124	500	124	500	125	500	125	500
Mohamed Ibrahim			108	0	114	0	122	0																
Cao Yupeng	38	132,525	38	132,525	41	128,525	42	128,000	43	128,000	43	128,000	44	128,000	41	128,000								
Yu Delu	43	117,225	45	117,225	49	113,225	48	113,225	51	110,600	51	110,600	52	108,100	60	98,100								

== Ranking points ==
Preceded by 2017/2018	2018/2019 points	Succeeded by 2019/2020

Below is a list of points awarded to each player for the events they participated in. Blank fields indicate that the player did not participate at the event.

Ranking points
No.	Player	17/18 Season	Tournament																				18/19 Season	Total
No.	Player	17/18 Season	RM	WO	PHC	CC	EUM	ENO	IC	NIO	UK	SCO	GM	WGP	WEO	SSO	IO	PC	GO	TC	CO	WC	18/19 Season	Total
1	Ronnie O'Sullivan	693000					0	20000		30000	170000	0		5000	3500			125000		150000		0	503500	1196500
2	Judd Trump	314500		8000		20000	4000	6000	21500	70000	15000	20000	10000	100000	2500			30000		40000	5000	500000	852000	1166500
3	Mark Williams	749500	3000	150000		13000	0	3500	4000	2500	15000		10000	5000	2500			15000		20000	5000	30000	278500	1028000
4	Neil Robertson	202000	50000	8000		7500	3000	6000	75000	3500	15000	2500	10000	5000	70000		0	50000		60000	225000	50000	640500	842500
5	John Higgins	449500				75000	0	6000	0	0	5000	6000	4000	5000	10000		15000	15000			5000	200000	346000	795500
6	Mark Selby	455725		13000		150000	6000	2500	21500	20000	0		5000	12500	6000			10000		20000	0	30000	296500	752225
7	Mark Allen	243000	4000	8000		7500	11000	2500	175000	0	75000	70000		7500	3500		0	30000		40000	0	0	434000	677000
8	Kyren Wilson	289725	6000	13000	20000	4000	6000	0	4000	0	22500	6000	80000	12500	2500	1000		10000	3000	20000	11000	50000	271500	561225
9	Barry Hawkins	252500	1500	32500		20000	3000	3500	8500	0	15000	0	4000	20000	3500	500		10000	0		5000	30000	157000	409500
10	Ding Junhui	295000		8000		7500			13500		15000	6000	10000	7500	6000						5000	30000	108500	403500
11	Jack Lisowski	152100	25000	20000	3000	7500	11000	3500	32000	3500	15000	2500	4000	5000	6000		2000	15000	1500		90000	0	246500	398600
12	David Gilbert	97000	1500	75000		4000	3000	2500	13500	10000	10000	2500	35000	12500	0	500	2000	10000	4000		11000	100000	297000	394000
13	Stuart Bingham	100500	0	0		7500	4000	70000	4000	0	35000	0	5000	7500	30000	4000	6000	15000	25000	20000	27000	30000	290000	390500
14	Shaun Murphy	277000	3000	0	0	13000	0	3500	0	0	0	30000	4000	5000	2500	500	4000		2500		0	30000	98000	375000
15	Luca Brecel	255100	1500	8000	1000	4000	6000	2500	0	6000	10000	3500	0		0	2000	6000		0		45000	0	95500	350600
16	Stephen Maguire	169500	15000	8000		4000	0	20000	8500	0	22500	0	20000	7500	0			10000			11000	50000	176500	346000
17	Ali Carter	124000	3000	8000		4000	4000	10000	21500	6000	10000	6000	0	40000	0	500		10000	0		11000	50000	184000	308000
18	Ryan Day	192500	1500	8000		7500	11000	10000	8500	10000	0	10000	4000	5000	0				12000		5000	10000	102500	295000
19	Joe Perry	135500	4000	13000		7500	35000	0	8500	0	22500	3500	5000	5000	3500	0	4000	10000	0		5000	20000	146500	282000
20	Gary Wilson	75500	0	20000	600	7500	4000	0	0	3500	10000	0	3000	5000	2500	1000	2000		3000		5000	100000	167100	242600
21	Yan Bingtao	144000	1500	8000		13000	3000	2500	13500	0	10000	3500	5000	5000	0	0	4000		3000		5000	15000	92000	236000
22	Graeme Dott	159500	6000	0		13000	0	0	4000	0	10000	6000	3000		0	1000	6000		0		0	20000	69000	228500
23	Anthony McGill	164500	1500	0		4000	6000	3500	4000	0	0	0	0		0	0	0		1500		18000	20000	58500	223000
24	Jimmy Robertson	92000	0	0	1725	0	75000	2500	4000	2500	5000	3500	4000	5000	3500	500	2000	10000	1500		0	10000	130725	222725
25	Xiao Guodong	111000	1500	20000	600	7500		0	8500	3500	10000	0	5000	20000	0	500	0				5000	10000	92100	203100
26	Lyu Haotian	94000	0	4000		32000	0	0	0	0	0	2500	0		0	0	25000				18000	15000	96500	190500
27	Tom Ford	94725	0	4000	1000	7500	0	0	8500	3500	35000	0	3000	7500	2500	500	2000		1500		0	15000	91500	186225
28	Mark King	85725	4000	0	1000	13000	17500	3500	8500	2500	10000	2500	3000	5000	0	0	0		1500		11000	10000	93000	178725
29	Li Hang	99000	3000	0		0	3000	0	4000	6000	5000	0	4000		0	4000	10000				18000	20000	77000	176000
30	Ricky Walden	107600	6000	13000		0	6000	6000	0	0	0	0	4000		2500	500	0		0		18000	10000	66000	173600
31	Zhou Yuelong	78500	1500	4000	0	0	4000	6000	8500	6000	10000	3500	4000		2500	0	2000		4000		5000	30000	91000	169500
32	Martin Gould	123500	0			0	0	3500	13500		5000		3000		0	500					0	20000	45500	169000
33	Mark Davis	62000	4000	4000	1725	4000	4000	30000	4000	3500	5000	2500	0	7500	0	0	10000		1500		0	20000	101725	163725
34	Matthew Selt	57000	0	13000	600	4000	0	3500	4000	0	5000	0	3000		2500	500	50000		0		5000	15000	106100	163100
35	Scott Donaldson	35500	3000	4000	4500	13000	3000	0	0	3500	5000	2500	0		10000	0	10000		2500		45000	20000	126000	161500
36	Robert Milkins	89500	1500	13000	600	4000	0	6000	8500	0	5000	2500	5000		0	0	0		4000		5000	15000	70100	159600
37	Thepchaiya Un-Nooh	65500		4000	1725	0	3000	3500	4000	10000	5000	0	0		2500	32000	4000		2500		0	20000	92225	157725
38	Noppon Saengkham	66100	0	32500	1000	7500	0	10000	4000	0	10000	0	3000	7500	3500	0	0		1500		0	10000	90500	156600
39	Ben Woollaston	77000	1500	8000	600	0	0	3500	4000	0	5000	2500	4000		2500	500	2000		2500		27000	15000	78600	155600
40	Hossein Vafaei	62000				13000	3000	2500	8500	0	10000	0	0		20000	500	4000				18000	10000	89500	151500
41	Liang Wenbo	79500	3000	0		13000	6000	2500	4000	0	0	0	3000		2500		2000				18000	15000	69000	148500
42	Martin O'Donnell	46100	0	4000	0	20000	0	0	21500	6000	22500	2500	0	5000	3500	0	0		0		0	15000	100000	146100
43	Matthew Stevens	61000	0	4000		0	0	3500	32000	3500	5000	6000	4000	5000	0	0			0		0	15000	78000	139000
44	Michael Holt	66500	3000	8000		0	0	0	8500	3500	5000	2500	0		0	16000	2000		0		11000	10000	69500	136000
45	Michael White	98500	3000	0	1000	4000	0	0	0	2500	0	2500	0		0	8000	2000		0		0	10000	33000	131500
46	Michael Georgiou	82500	0	4000	600	0	3000	0	4000	0	0	2500	4000		6000	500	2000		1500		0	20000	48100	130600
47	Peter Ebdon	59000	0	4000	10000	4000	3000	2500	0	10000	5000	0	5000		0	0	4000		1500		11000	10000	70000	129000
48	Chris Wakelin	66725	6000	4000	1725	4000	3000	2500	4000	2500	5000	0	3000		0	0	6000		2500		5000	10000	59225	125950
49	Kurt Maflin	65600	1500	4000	600	4000	0	0	4000	2500	5000	0	4000		10000	500	0		3000		5000	15000	59100	124700
50	Stuart Carrington	45000	15000	4000	0	4000	3000	2500	13500	2500	0	10000	3000	5000	0	0	2000				11000	0	75500	120500
51	Alan McManus	56000	0	0		0	4000	3500	4000	2500	10000	2500	0		0	1000	0				27000	10000	64500	120500
52	Sunny Akani	60000	0	4000		4000	0	2500	13500	2500	15000	0	3000		0	1000	0				0	10000	55500	115500
53	Yuan Sijun	28000	0	4000	0	20000	3000	3500	13500	2500	0	3500	5000	12500	2500	0	4000		6000		5000	0	85000	113000
54	Mark Joyce	83500	0	4000	1000	4000	0	0	0	0	5000	3500	0		0	0	0		0		0	10000	27500	111000
55	Marco Fu	42000	3000	20000		4000	3000	2500	8500	0	10000	2500	0	7500	2500						5000	0	68500	110500
56	Ken Doherty	61000		0		4000	3000	0	4000	0	5000	0	3000		2500	500	0		2500		11000	10000	45500	106500
57	Andrew Higginson	54600	0	8000	1000	0	4000	0	4000	6000	5000	0	0		0	0	4000		3000		11000	0	46000	100600
58	Daniel Wells	40000	0	0	3000	4000	0	6000	0	2500	5000	20000	0		0	2000	0		3000		0	15000	60500	100500
59	Zhao Xintong	0	4000	4000		32000	3000	2500	8500	0	0	3500	3000	5000	10000	1000	4000		0		0	20000	100500	100500
60	Robbie Williams	58600	1500	4000	0	0	0	0	0	6000	0	2500	0		6000	0	0		0		11000	10000	41000	99600
61	Liam Highfield	59100	1500	0	1000	4000	3000	0	4000	2500	5000	0	0		0	0	2000		2500		0	10000	35500	94600
62	Anthony Hamilton	23500	4000	13000		4000	17500	0	0	0	0	2500	0		2500	0	15000		1500		0	10000	70000	93500
63	Fergal O'Brien	45100	1500	13000	600	7500	4000	0	0	0	0	0	4000		0	0	2000		1500		0	10000	44100	89200
64	Mike Dunn	66500	0	4000		4000	0	0	0	0	5000	2500	0		3500	1000	0		0		0	0	20000	86500
65	Dominic Dale	44500	0	4000	600	0	0	0	0	0	5000	2500	3000		2500	2000	2000		1500		5000	10000	38100	82600
66	Jamie Jones	62500	3000	8000	600	7500	0		0								0						19100	81600
67	Eden Sharav	13500	0	0	600	0	4000	6000	8500	20000	0	2500	3000		0		4000		2500		0	15000	66100	79600
68	Lu Ning	0	0	0	1000	0	0	0	0	6000	15000	3500	3000		0	0	10000		6000		18000	15000	77500	77500
69	Gerard Greene	36500	1500	0	600	4000	0	0	0	2500	0	2500	3000		0	0	2000		0		11000	10000	37100	73600
70	Ian Burns	27000	1500	0	600	0	0	2500	8500	2500	5000	6000	0		6000	0	2000		1500		0	10000	46100	73100
71	Rory McLeod	41000	1500	4000	0	0	3000	0	0	2500	5000	0	4000		0	2000	2000		1500		0	0	25500	66500
72	Sam Craigie	0	1500	0	0	4000	3000	2500	0	2500	0	0	3000		3500	0	6000		0		27000	10000	63000	63000
73	Alexander Ursenbacher	33100	0	4000	600	4000	3000	2500	0	2500	0	0	0		6000	0	2000				5000	0	29600	62700
74	Tian Pengfei	0	1500	0		0	11000	0	4000	2500	10000	6000	0		0	2000	0		4000		0	20000	61000	61000
75	Joe O'Connor	0	3000	0	1000	0	0	0	0	0	10000	0	0		20000	0	0		0		11000	15000	60000	60000
76	Duane Jones	20000	0	0		0	3000	0	0	0	0	0	20000		3500	0	2000		0		0	10000	38500	58500
77	Xu Si	29500	1500	0		4000	0	2500	0	0	0	0	0		2500	0	0		0		5000	10000	25500	55000
78	Mei Xiwen	0	1500	8000		7500	0	3500	0	2500	5000	0	0		2500	500	2000				11000	10000	54000	54000
79	Jimmy White	27500	1500	0		0	0	2500	4000	0	0	0	3000		2500	1000	0		1500		0	10000	26000	53500
80	Zhang Yong	27000	4000	0	1000	0	3000	2500	0	0	0	3500	0		0	0	2000		0		0	10000	26000	53000
81	Luo Honghao	0	0	0		4000	3000	10000	4000	2500	5000	0	3000		0	0	0		0		0	20000	51500	51500
82	Nigel Bond	17600	1500	0	0	4000	0	2500	0	2500	0	3500	0		2500	0	0		1500		5000	10000	33000	50600
83	Peter Lines	23725	1500	0	4500	0	4000	0	4000	2500	0	0	0		2500	500	2000		2500		0	0	24000	47725
84	Rod Lawler	5600	1500	4000	1000	0	0	0	0	0	5000	0	0		0	4000	0		1500		18000	0	35000	40600
85	Sam Baird	0	0	0	1000	0	0	2500	4000	2500	5000	10000	4000		0	4000	2000		0		5000	0	40000	40000
86	Craig Steadman	0	4000	0	1000	0	4000	3500	4000	0	0	0	3000		3500	500	4000		0		11000	0	38500	38500
87	John Astley	0	0	0	0	4000	0	0	4000	0	0	0	3000		0	500	4000		1500		5000	15000	37000	37000
88	Zhang Anda	0	0	4000	3000	7500	6000	0	4000	2500	0	3500	0		3500	1000	0		0		0	0	35000	35000
89	Joe Swail	8500	3000	0	600	0	0	0	0	3500	5000	2500	3000		2500	500	4000		1500		0	0	26100	34600
90	Robin Hull	22500	1500	0		0	0	0	0	3500	0	2500	0		0	0	2000		2500		0	0	12000	34500
91	Allan Taylor	20750	0	0	600	4000	4000	2500	0	0	0	0	0		0	1000	0		0		0	0	12100	32850
92	Paul Davison	12500	0	4000	0	0	3000	0	0	0	5000	2500	0		3500	0	2000		0		0	0	20000	32500
93	Jak Jones	0	0	8000		0	4000	0	0	0	10000	2500	3000		3500	1000	0		0		0	0	32000	32000
94	Elliot Slessor	0	0	4000	0	0	4000	2500	0	0	0	2500	0		6000	500	4000		2500		5000	0	31000	31000
95	Ross Muir	10000	0	0	600	0	6000	0	0	2500	0	3500	3000		2500	0	0		2500		0	0	20600	30600
96	Alfie Burden	0	1500	0	1000	0	3000	0	13500	0	0	10000	0		0	0	0		0		0	0	29000	29000
97	Oliver Lines	0	3000	0	0	0	3000	2500	0	0	0	0	3000		2500	1000	6000		0		5000	0	26000	26000
98	Li Yuan	22500	1500	0		0	0	0	0	0	0	0	0		0	0	2000				0		3500	26000
99	Billy Joe Castle	11500	0	0	1725	0	0	0	0	3500	0	3500	0		2500	500	0		1500		0	0	13225	24725
100	Chris Totten	14500	0	0	0	0	3000	0	0	3500	0	0	3000		0	0	0		0		0	0	9500	24000
101	Niu Zhuang	16000	1500	0	600	0	0	0	0	2500	0	0	3000		0	0	0				0	0	7600	23600
102	Chen Zifan	17500	0	0	600	0	0	0	0	2500	0	0	0		0	0	0		1500		0	0	4600	22100
103	Soheil Vahedi	12500	0	0		0	0	0	0	0	0	2500	0		2500		4000		0		0	0	9000	21500
104	Jordan Brown	0	0	0	1000	0	0	3500	4000	0	0	0	3000		0	0	0		0		0	10000	21500	21500
105	Lee Walker	0	1500	4000	3000	0	3000	2500	0	2500	0	2500	0		0	0	2000		0		0	0	21000	21000
106	Ashley Hugill	16000			0	0	3000	0	0	0	0	0	0		0	0	0		1500		0	0	4500	20500
107	Hamza Akbar	10500				0	0	0	0	3500	0	0	0		0	500	2000		2500		0	0	8500	19000
108	Ashley Carty	0	3000	0	0	4000	0	0	0	0	0	2500	0		0	0	2000		1500		5000	0	18000	18000
109	James Wattana	0		0		0	0	0	4000	0	0	0			2500	0					11000	0	17500	17500
110	Thor Chuan Leong	0	0	0	0	0	4000	2500	0	0	0	0	0		2500	500	2000				5000	0	16500	16500
111	Lukas Kleckers	2000	3000	0	600	0	0	2500	0	0	0	0	3000		3500	1000	0		0		0	0	13600	15600
112	Jamie Clarke	0	0	0	0	0	0	0	0	0	0	0	0		0	8000	0		2500		5000	0	15500	15500
113	Zhang Jiankang	0	0	0	600	0	3000	2500	0	0	0	3500	0		2500	0	0		1500		0		13600	13600
114	Sanderson Lam	8000	0	0	0	0	0	0	0	3500	0	0	0		0	0	0		0		0	0	3500	11500
115	Sean O'Sullivan	6000	0	0	0	0	0	0	0	2500	0	0	0		0	0	0		2500		0	0	5000	11000
116	Chen Feilong	0	0	0	0	0	0	0	0	2500	5000	2500	0		0	500	0		0		0	0	10500	10500
117	Harvey Chandler	0	0	8000	1725	0	0	0	0	0	0	0	0		0	0	0		0		0	0	9725	9725
118	Kishan Hirani	0	0	0	600	0	0	0	0	2500	0	0	0		0	500	0		0		5000	0	8600	8600
119	Hammad Miah	0	0	0	1725	0	0	0	0	3500	0	0	0		2500	0	0		0		0	0	7725	7725
120	Adam Stefanow	0	0	0	0	0	0	2500	0	0	0	0	0		0	0	0		0		5000	0	7500	7500
121	Andy Lee	0	0	4000	0	0	0	0	0	0	0	0	0		0	0	0		2500		0	0	6500	6500
122	Rhys Clark	2500	0	0		4000			0			0			0						0	0	4000	6500
123	Fan Zhengyi	0	0	0	0	0	0	0	4000	0	0	0	0		0	0	0		1500		0	0	5500	5500
124	Simon Lichtenberg	0	0	4000	600	0	0	0	0	0	0	0	0		0	0	0		0		0	0	4600	4600
125	Basem Eltahhan	500	0	0	0	0	0			0	0	0	0				0					0	0	500
