= Jimmy Robertson (snooker player) =

English snooker player (born 1986)

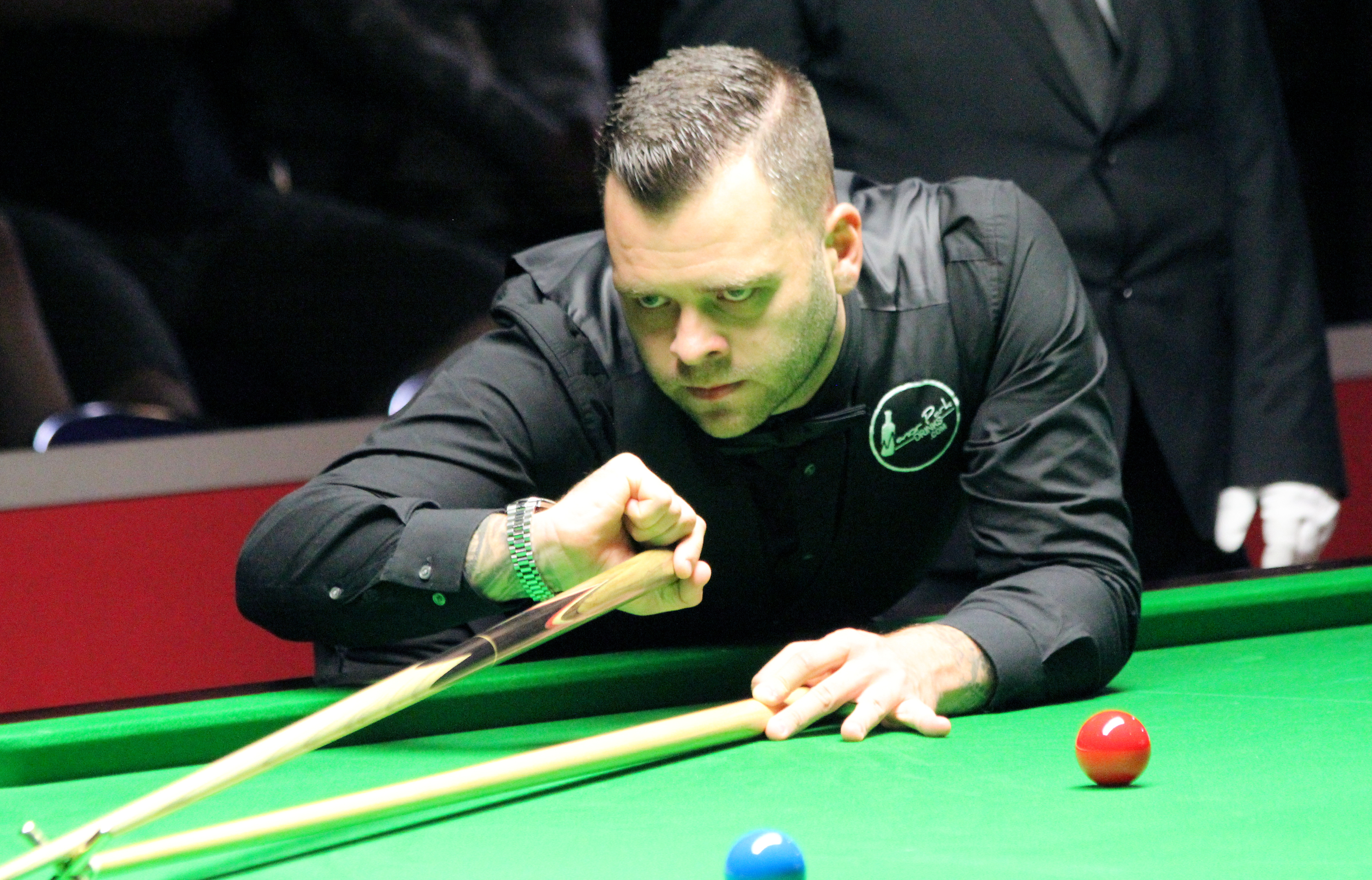
- Robertson at the 2018 Paul Hunter Classic

Personal information
- Born: 3 May 1986 (age 40) Bexhill-on-Sea, England

Sport
- Country: England
- Sport: Snooker
- Professional: 2002/03, 2007/08, 2009–present
- Highest ranking: 21 (March 2019)
- Current ranking: 41 (as of 7 November 2026)
- Century breaks: 230 (as of 17 November 2026)

Tournament wins
- Ranking: 1

Jimmy Robertson (born 3 May 1986) is an English professional snooker player.

In October 2018, Robertson won his first ranking title at the 2018 European Masters, defeating Joe Perry 9–6 in the final, despite never previously having gone beyond the quarter-finals of a ranking event. Robertson also holds the record for the most points scored in a frame in professional competition, scoring 178 against Lee Walker at the 2021 Scottish Open.

== Career ==
=== 2002–2011 ===
He was on the main tour for 2002–03 where he was the youngest player on the tour. He qualified for the main tour again in 2007–08, by becoming the number One Ranked English Amateur, through winning the EASB (English Governing Body) pro-Ticket Tour Rankings.

Robertson also won the EASB Pro-Ticket tour for a second time in April 2009, to finish as England's Number one Amateur for the second time, which guaranteed him a place on the World Snookers main Professional tour for the third time for the 2009/10 season. He also added the English Amateur Championships to his portfolio of victories, by beating David Craggs 9–8.

His third return to the professional main tour ranks in 2009/10, saw him rise up the ranks, to number 63 in the world. He got off to a terrific start in the first event, the Shanghai Masters, where he won his first three qualifiers, and then faced former world champion Graeme Dott. Despite taking a 4–1 lead, Robertson lost 4–5.

In the 2010/11, Robertson continued to rise up the rankings. He also qualified for the main draw of a ranking event for the first time, at the 2011 World Snooker Championship. He defeated Xiao Guodong, Tony Drago, and former world champion Ken Doherty to qualify for his Crucible debut. He won the first frame of his first round match against Mark Selby only to lose the match 10–1.

=== 2011–12 season ===
Robertson qualified for one ranking event in the 2011–12 season, the World Open, thanks to wins over Andrew Norman, Ken Doherty and Rory McLeod, before seeing off amateur Zhou Yuelong in the wildcard round at the event in Haikou, China. In the first round of the event proper he played Mark Allen and was beaten 1–5, with the Northern Irishman later going on to win the tournament. Robertson reached the semi-finals of Event 7 of the minor-ranking Players Tour Championship series, where he lost 0–4 to Matthew Stevens. He played in 11 out of 12 of these events, also picking up a last 16 finish in Event 4 to be placed 31st on the PTC Order of Merit, just outside the top 24 who made the Finals. Robertson finished the season ranked world number 55, inside the top 64 who automatically retained their places for the 2012–13 season.

=== 2012–13 season ===
Robertson qualified for two ranking events during the 2012/2013 season. The first of these was the Shanghai Masters by beating Tian Pengfei, Jack Lisowski and Anthony Hamilton, but he was defeated 4–5 by Jin Long in the wildcard round in Shanghai. His second appearance at a ranking event was at the China Open by seeing off Robbie Williams and Joe Perry in qualifying and this time came through the wildcard round with a 5–1 defeat of Wang Yuchen, compiling his highest competitive break of 142 in the process He faced Neil Robertson in the last 32 and was whitewashed 0–5. Robertson had a consistent season in the ten Players Tour Championship events, with his best result being a last 16 loss to Andrew Higginson in the Scottish Open, to finish 45th on the PTC Order of Merit. Robertson's season ended when he was beaten 3–10 by Liang Wenbo in the third round of World Championship Qualifying, to be placed world number 52 in the rankings.

=== 2013–14 season ===
He began the 2013–14 season by qualifying for the Wuxi Classic and whitewashed Graeme Dott 5–0 in the first round, before losing 5–4 to Scott Donaldson in the last 32. Robertson lost in the last 64 of four other ranking events during the season. He had a very good season in the European Tour events as he reached the quarter-finals of the Bulgarian Open where he was beaten 4–2 by Neil Robertson. Robertson had a very eventful tournament at the Bluebell Wood Open as Stuart Bingham made a 72 break in the deciding frame of their second round match, before Robertson cleared the table with a 73 break to win. In the last 16 he came back from 3–0 against Vinnie Calabrese to triumph 4–3 and reach another quarter-final, where Ding Junhui defeated him 4–1. Robertson finished 20th on the Order of Merit which saw him qualify for the Finals for the first time in his career, but he lost 4–2 to John Higgins in the opening round.

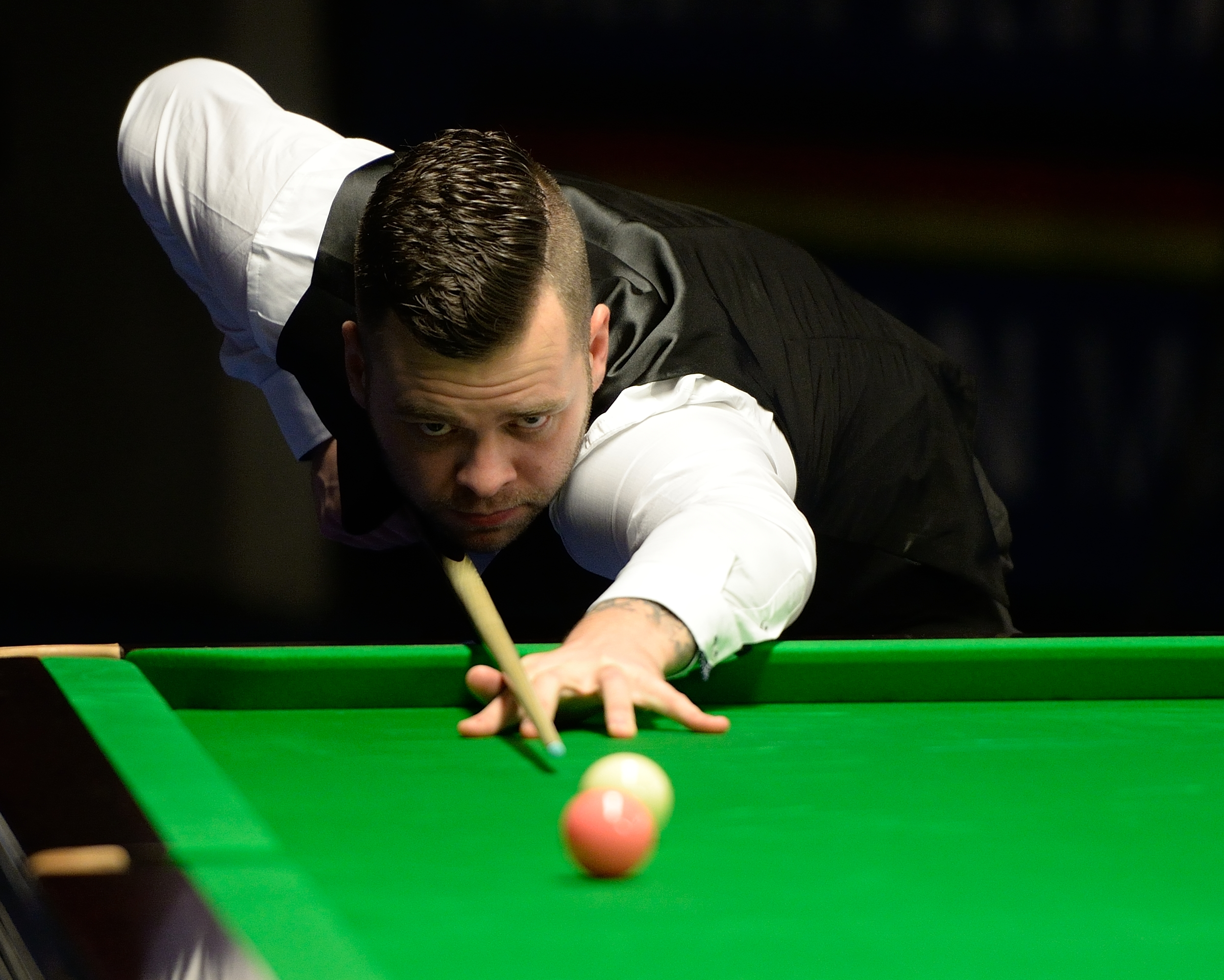
Jimmy Robertson at the 2015 German Masters

=== 2014–15 season ===
Robertson played at the venue stage of eight ranking tournaments this year, the most he has reached in any one season. However, he was unable to win past the last 32 in any of them. He had another good season in the minor-ranking Players Tour Championship events, losing in the semi-finals of the Asian Tour's Haining City Open 4–3 to Oliver Lines which saw him finish eighth on the Order of Merit. His other semi-final came on the European Tour at the Gdynia Open where he was whitewashed 4–0 by Mark Williams. Robertson was ranked 15th on their Order of Merit. He qualified for his second World Championship by edging Xiao Guodong 10–9 on the final pink. Robertson made a 106 break to level his first round tie with Marco Fu at 5–5, but would go on to lose 10–6. His ranking of 41st in the world was the highest Robertson had finished a season at that point in his career.

=== 2015–16 season ===
At the Haining Open, Robertson reached the semi-finals by knocking out Xiao Guodong and Thepchaiya Un-Nooh from the fourth round stage, but he lost 4–2 to Ding Junhui. He reached the last 16 of a ranking event for the first time in his career by beating Darryl Hill 6–2 and Barry Hawkins 6–4 at the International Championship and then lost 6–3 to Marco Fu. Robertson saw off Michael Wild 4–3 and Michael Holt 4–1 in reaching the third round of the Welsh Open, where he was thrashed 4–0 by Ronnie O'Sullivan. He lost 5–1 to Judd Trump in the second round of the China Open and 10–2 to Alan McManus in the last round of World Championship qualifying. Robertson's end of season ranking of 34 is the highest he has ever finished a year in his career.

=== 2016–17 season ===
Robertson reached the last 16 of a ranking event for the second time by beating Dechawat Poomjaeng 4–0 and Martin O'Donnell 4–3 at the Riga Masters and was defeated 4–1 by John Astley. He also recorded the event's high break of 138. Robertson was thrashed 5–0 by Shaun Murphy in the second round of the World Open after he had eliminated Wang Yuchen 5–1 in the opener. He won through to the third round of both the UK Championship and Welsh Open, but failed to pick up a frame in losses to Oliver Lines and Scott Donaldson respectively. Robertson defeated Cao Yupeng 10–8, Oliver Lines 10–4 and Rod Lawler 10–6 to qualify for the World Championship and played Mark Allen in the opening round. In a close match he was edged out 10–8.

=== 2017–18 season ===
With his partner Hayley due to give birth to their second child, Robertson withdrew from the 2017 Riga Masters. He also spoke about how he had been frustrated with his performances in big matches and had been working with a sports psychologist during the World Championship to help him prepare for the season ahead. His best performance in the first half of the season was reaching the last 16 of the 2017 World Open, where he lost 5–1 to Mark Williams. However he did reach the quarter-finals of a ranking event for the first time at the 2018 German Masters. After qualifying victories over Rhys Clark and Peter Lines, he defeated defending champion Anthony Hamilton 5–1 in the last 32 and Gary Wilson 5–3 in the last 16 before losing out to Williams 5–3. After losing in the opening round of the next five ranking events, he once again came through qualifying for the World Championship, defeating Alex Borg 10–2, Sam Baird 10–7 and Michael White 10–7. Making his fourth Crucible appearance, it was eventual tournament winner Williams who defeated him with a 10–5 victory in the first round.

=== 2018–19 season: first ranking title ===
"It means everything, it is everything I have dreamed of since I was a little boy. I am so happy to win my first title, to be honest I wasn’t sure this would ever happen. My season has been poor, and my career...I have had wins but not gone deep in tournaments. This has come out of the blue a bit, but somewhere in me I believed I had this in me even though I hadn’t produced it."

— Robertson on winning his first ranking title at the 2018 European Masters

Robertson had an up and down start to the 2018–19 snooker season, failing to qualify for the Riga Masters, World Open and China Championship, but reached the last 16 at the Paul Hunter Classic where he lost 4–0 to Jack Lisowski. At the European Masters, Robertson unexpectedly won the tournament and his first ranking title. After defeating Andy Lee 4–3 in qualifying, at the main stages of the tournament in Lommel, Belgium, his first three matches were also won in a deciding frame (4–3 victories against Zhang Yong, Zhou Yuelong and Anthony McGill respectively). He defeated Mark Allen 4–2 in the quarter-finals and Mark King 6–4 in the semi-finals to set up a final against Joe Perry, who had won one ranking event previously. In the first session Robertson raced into a 5–0 lead before Perry recovered to 5–3. In the second session Robertson went 7–3 ahead before Perry once again won three frames in a row to close the gap to 7–6. Robertson then managed to win the remaining two frames (with a century in the last frame) to win the match 9–6.

Due to his victory, Robertson received an entry to the Champion of Champions for the first time. Drawn against Shaun Murphy in the opening round, he lost 4–2. The boost to his seasons's ranking points also helped him to qualify for the Players Championship for the first time in its current format; he was whitewashed 6–0 by reigning world champion Judd Trump in the first round. In the first round of qualifying for the World Championship, Robertson recorded a rare whitewash of his own with a 10–0 victory over Chen Feilong; he then lost in the second round of qualifying 9–10 to Joe O'Connor.

=== 2019–20 season ===
Despite starting the season ranked 24th in the world, Robertson could not build on his success of the previous season during 2019–20 as he failed to advance beyond the last 32 of a ranking event in the first half of the season until the 2019 Scottish Open, where he reached the last 16 before losing 4–0 to eventual tournament winner Mark Selby. The furthest he advanced in a ranking tournament that season was at the 2020 Gibraltar Open where he was defeated in the quarter-finals 4–3 by Xiao Guodong in a tournament seriously effected by the emerging COVID-19 pandemic. At the rescheduled qualifying for the World Championship, Robertson lost 6–4 to Ashley Carty in the first round.

=== 2020–21 season ===
During the 2020–21 season which was played almost entirely behind closed doors, Robertson endured a nightmare run of results, losing in the opening round on five occasions and leaving his place on the tour in jeopardy; his best finish was at the 2020 English Open where he reached the last 32 before losing 4–1 to John Higgins. After reaching a career high ranking of 21st in March 2019, Robertson was ranked 61st before entering qualifying for the World Championship, and failure to win and results going against him could have resulted in Robertson dropping out of the top 64 in the rankings and being relegated from the tour. He faced Zhao Jianbo in the first round of qualifying and after trailing 3–0, won 6–5. Despite losing by the same scoreline to Lu Ning in the next round, the win was enough to narrowly maintain his place on the tour, finishing the season ranked 63rd. Robertson later revealed that working with a mind coach on his mental approach had helped him to get over the line in his decisive match and that he had "belief" in his ability going forward.

=== 2021–22 season ===
Robertson began the season with advancing to the second group phase of the Championship League. He then reached the second ranking semi-final of his career at the 2021 British Open where he lost 4–1 to eventual winner Mark Williams. After a narrow 4–3 defeat to Judd Trump at the 2021 Northern Ireland Open in the last 16, he reached the quarter-final of the 2021 World Grand Prix where he was defeated 5–2 by Ronnie O'Sullivan.

== Personal life ==
Robertson has two children with his partner Hayley and owns O'Sullivan's Snooker & Pool Club in his hometown of Bexhill-on-Sea, East Sussex. He is a close friend and practice partner of fellow professional Mark Davis.

== Performance and rankings timeline ==
Tournament	2002/ 03	2003/ 04	2004/ 05	2007/ 08	2009/ 10	2010/ 11	2011/ 12	2012/ 13	2013/ 14	2014/ 15	2015/ 16	2016/ 17	2017/ 18	2018/ 19	2019/ 20		2020/ 21	2021/ 22	2022/ 23	2023/ 24	2024/ 25	2025/ 26	2026/ 27
Ranking (Note: It shows the ranking at the beginning of the season)	(Note: New players on the Main Tour don't have a ranking)	(Note: He was an amateur)				63	53	55	52	54	41	34	38	34	24		28	63	25	24	49	35	33
Ranking tournaments
Championship League	Not Held			Non-Ranking Event													RR	2R	2R	RR	RR	RR	2R
China Open	Not Held		A	LQ	LQ	LQ	LQ	1R	1R	1R	2R	1R	1R	LQ	Tournament Not Held								LQ
Wuhan Open	Tournament Not Held																			LQ	1R	1R	LQ
British Open	LQ	A	A	Tournament Not Held														SF	2R	2R	LQ	LQ	1R
English Open	Tournament Not Held											1R	3R	2R	2R		3R	1R	LQ	2R	1R	1R	1R
Shenzhen Open (Note: The event was called the Xi'an Grand Prix (2024/2025–2025/2026))	Tournament Not Held																				3R	2R	SF
Northern Ireland Open	Tournament Not Held											2R	3R	2R	2R		1R	3R	2R	2R	2R	2R	LQ
International Championship	Tournament Not Held							LQ	LQ	1R	3R	1R	2R	1R	2R		Not Held			1R	1R	2R	LQ
UK Championship	LQ	A	A	LQ	LQ	LQ	LQ	LQ	2R	2R	2R	3R	3R	2R	2R		1R	2R	LQ	LQ	LQ	LQ	
Shoot Out	Tournament Not Held					Non-Ranking Event						3R	1R	2R	1R		1R	1R	2R	4R	1R	2R	
Scottish Open (Note: The event was called the Players Championship (2003/2004))	LQ	A	Tournament Not Held					MR	Not Held			1R	2R	3R	4R		1R	2R	2R	1R	1R	LQ	
German Masters	Tournament Not Held					LQ	LQ	LQ	1R	1R	1R	LQ	QF	1R	LQ		LQ	1R	2R	1R	2R	QF	LQ
Welsh Open	LQ	A	A	LQ	LQ	LQ	LQ	LQ	2R	2R	3R	3R	1R	3R	3R		2R	3R	LQ	LQ	1R	1R	
World Grand Prix	Tournament Not Held									NR	DNQ	DNQ	1R	1R	DNQ		DNQ	QF	DNQ	DNQ	2R	DNQ	
Players Championship (Note: The event was called the Players Tour Championship Grand Final (2010/2011–2015/2016))	Tournament Not Held					DNQ	DNQ	DNQ	1R	1R	1R	DNQ	DNQ	1R	DNQ		DNQ	SF	DNQ	DNQ	DNQ	DNQ	
World Open (Note: The event was called the LG Cup (2002/2003–2003/2004) and the LG Cup (2004/2005, 2007/2008 and 2009/2010))	Tournament Not Held					LQ	1R	LQ	LQ	Not Held		2R	3R	LQ	2R		Not Held			LQ	3R	LQ	
Tour Championship	Tournament Not Held													DNQ	DNQ		DNQ	DNQ	DNQ	DNQ	DNQ	DNQ	
World Championship	LQ	LQ	LQ	LQ	LQ	1R	LQ	LQ	LQ	1R	LQ	1R	1R	LQ	LQ		LQ	LQ	1R	LQ	LQ	LQ	
Non-ranking tournaments
Champion of Champions	Tournament Not Held								A	A	A	A	A	1R	A		A	A	A	A	A	A	
The Masters	LQ	A	A	LQ	LQ	A	A	A	A	A	A	A	A	A	A		A	A	A	A	A	A	
Championship League	Not Held			A	A	A	A	A	A	A	A	A	RR	RR	RR	RR	A	A	RR	RR	RR	RR	
Former ranking tournaments
Irish Masters	LQ	A	A	Tournament Not Held																			
Northern Ireland Trophy	Not Held			LQ	Tournament Not Held																		
Wuxi Classic (Note: The event was called the Jiangsu Classic (2009/2010))	Tournament Not Held				Non-Ranking			LQ	2R	LQ	Tournament Not Held												
Australian Goldfields Open	Tournament Not Held						LQ	LQ	LQ	LQ	LQ	Tournament Not Held											
Shanghai Masters	Not Held			LQ	LQ	LQ	LQ	WR	LQ	1R	LQ	LQ	2R	Non-Ranking			Not Held			Non-Ranking Event			
Paul Hunter Classic (Note: The event was called the Grand Prix Fürth (2004/2005))	Not Held		Pro-am Event			Minor-Ranking Event						1R	1R	4R	NR		Tournament Not Held						
Indian Open	Tournament Not Held								LQ	LQ	NH	1R	1R	1R	Tournament Not Held								
Riga Masters (Note: The event was called the Riga Open (2014/2015–2015/2016))	Tournament Not Held									Minor-Rank		3R	WD	LQ	LQ		Tournament Not Held						
China Championship	Tournament Not Held											NR	1R	LQ	LQ		Tournament Not Held						
WST Pro Series	Tournament Not Held																RR	Tournament Not Held					
Turkish Masters	Tournament Not Held																	2R	Tournament Not Held				
Gibraltar Open	Tournament Not Held										MR	2R	1R	2R	QF		2R	4R	Tournament Not Held				
WST Classic	Tournament Not Held																		1R	Tournament Not Held			
European Masters (Note: The event was called the European Open (2002/2003–2003/2004) and the Malta Cup (2004/2005 and 2007/2008))	LQ	A	A	NR	Tournament Not Held							LQ	LQ	W	LQ		1R	LQ	2R	3R	Not Held		
Saudi Arabia Masters	Tournament Not Held																				QF	3R	NH
Former non-ranking tournaments
Masters Qualifying Event (Note: The event was called the Benson and Hedges Championship (2002/2003))	1R	A	A	1R	1R	Tournament Not Held																	
Shoot Out	Tournament Not Held					1R	1R	3R	2R	1R	2R	Ranking Event											
Six-red World Championship (Note: The event was called the Six-red World Grand Prix (2009/2010))	Tournament Not Held				A	A	NH	A	A	A	A	A	A	RR	A		Not Held		RR	Tournament Not Held			
Haining Open	Tournament Not Held									Minor-Rank		1R	A	3R	3R		NH	A	A	Tournament Not Held			

Performance Table Legend
LQ	lost in the qualifying draw	#R	lost in the early rounds of the tournament (WR = Wildcard round, RR = Round robin)	QF	lost in the quarter-finals
SF	lost in the semi-finals	F	lost in the final	W	won the tournament
DNQ	did not qualify for the tournament	A	did not participate in the tournament	WD	withdrew from the tournament

NH / Not Held	means an event was not held.
NR / Non-Ranking Event	means an event is/was no longer a ranking event.
R / Ranking Event	means an event is/was a ranking event.
MR / Minor-Ranking Event	means an event is/was a minor-ranking event.

== Career finals ==
=== Ranking finals: 1 (1 title) ===
Outcome	No.	Year	Championship	Opponent in the final	Score
Winner	1.	2018	European Masters	(England) Joe Perry	9–6

=== Amateur finals: 1 (1 title) ===
Outcome	No.	Year	Championship	Opponent in the final	Score
Winner	1.	2009	English Amateur Championship	(England) David Craggs	9–8
