= 2019 World Grand Prix =

2019 World Grand Prix may refer to:

- 2019 World Grand Prix (darts)
- 2019 World Grand Prix (snooker)
