= 2018 World Open (snooker) =

World Open
Tournament information
- Dates: 6–12 August 2018
- Venue: Yushan No.1 Middle School
- City: Yushan
- Country: China
- Organisation: World Snooker
- Format: Ranking event
- Total prize fund: £735,000
- Winner's share: £150,000
- Highest break: David Gilbert (ENG) (142); Noppon Saengkham (THA) (142)

Final
- Champion: Mark Williams (WAL)
- Runner-up: David Gilbert (ENG)
- Score: 10–9

The 2018 HongRuiMa Yushan World Open was a professional ranking snooker tournament that took place between 6 and 12 August 2018 in Yushan, China. It was the second ranking event of the 2018/19 season.

Qualifying took place between 6–9 July in Preston. Ding Junhui was the defending champion, who defeated Kyren Wilson 10–3 in the 2017 World Open final, but lost 4–5 to Robert Milkins in the last 32 of the 2018 event.

Mark Williams won his 22nd ranking title, defeating David Gilbert 10–9 in the final. Williams trailed 5–9 but won the last 5 frames. It was the fourth time he had won this event, having won it twice when the tournament was named the Grand Prix and once when the tournament was named the LG Cup.

== Prize fund ==
The breakdown of prize money for this year is shown below:

- Winner: £150,000
- Runner-up: £75,000
- Semi-final: £32,500
- Quarter-final: £20,000
- Last 16: £13,000
- Last 32: £8,000
- Last 64: £4,000
- Highest break: £5,000
- Total: £735,000

The "rolling 147 prize" for a maximum break stood at £15,000

== Main draw ==
Last 64; Best of 9 frames
(China) Ding Junhui	5
(China) Yuan Sijun	3
(England) Robert Milkins	5
(England) David Lilley	4
(Hong Kong) Marco Fu	5
(England) Peter Ebdon	4
(England) James Cahill	4
(England) Andrew Higginson	5
(Wales) Matthew Stevens	w/d
(England) David Gilbert	w/o
(England) Rory McLeod	0
(England) Ali Carter	5
(Wales) Dominic Dale	3
(England) Ricky Walden	5
(Hong Kong) Andy Lee	1
(Australia) Neil Robertson	5
(England) Barry Hawkins	5
(Thailand) Sunny Akani	2
(England) Michael Holt	5
(England) Mark Davis	3
(Wales) Lee Walker	4
(England) Matthew Selt	5
(China) Yan Bingtao	5
(England) Stuart Carrington	0
(Republic of Ireland) Fergal O'Brien	5
(China) Zhao Xintong	4
(Scotland) Scott Donaldson	4
(Belgium) Luca Brecel	5
(England) Gary Wilson	5
(England) Tom Ford	3
(England) Martin O'Donnell	1
(England) Judd Trump	5
(England) Mark Selby	5
(England) Elliot Slessor	3
(China) Zhou Yuelong	2
(Wales) Jamie Jones	5
(Wales) Ryan Day	5
(England) Robbie Williams	2
(England) Rod Lawler	3
(Thailand) Noppon Saengkham	5
(Cyprus) Michael Georgiou	1
(China) Xiao Guodong	5
(Wales) Jak Jones	5
(China) Zhang Anda	3
(England) Mark Joyce	2
(England) Anthony Hamilton	5
(Germany) Simon Lichtenberg	2
(China) Mei Xiwen	5
(England) Kyren Wilson	5
(England) Paul Davison	1
(England) Harvey Chandler	5
(Norway) Kurt Maflin	4
(Northern Ireland) Mark Allen	5
(China) Lyu Haotian	1
(England) Jack Lisowski	5
(England) Chris Wakelin	0
(England) Mike Dunn	4
(England) Joe Perry	5
(Thailand) Thepchaiya Un-Nooh	4
(Scotland) Stephen Maguire	5
(England) Ben Woollaston	5
(China) Chang Bingyu	1
(Switzerland) Alexander Ursenbacher	1
(Wales) Mark Williams	5

Last 32; Best of 9 frames
(China) Ding Junhui	4
(England) Robert Milkins	5
(Hong Kong) Marco Fu	5
(England) Andrew Higginson	4
(England) David Gilbert	5
(England) Ali Carter	3
(England) Ricky Walden	5
(Australia) Neil Robertson	3
(England) Barry Hawkins	5
(England) Michael Holt	2
(England) Matthew Selt	5
(China) Yan Bingtao	3
(Republic of Ireland) Fergal O'Brien	5
(Belgium) Luca Brecel	4
(England) Gary Wilson	5
(England) Judd Trump	3
(England) Mark Selby	5
(Wales) Jamie Jones	2
(Wales) Ryan Day	2
(Thailand) Noppon Saengkham	5
(China) Xiao Guodong	5
(Wales) Jak Jones	0
(England) Anthony Hamilton	5
(China) Mei Xiwen	4
(England) Kyren Wilson	5
(England) Harvey Chandler	3
(Northern Ireland) Mark Allen	1
(England) Jack Lisowski	5
(England) Joe Perry	5
(Scotland) Stephen Maguire	4
(England) Ben Woollaston	2
(Wales) Mark Williams	5

Last 16; Best of 9 frames
(England) Robert Milkins	2
(Hong Kong) Marco Fu	5
(England) David Gilbert	5
(England) Ricky Walden	3
(England) Barry Hawkins	5
(England) Matthew Selt	4
(Republic of Ireland) Fergal O'Brien	2
(England) Gary Wilson	5
(England) Mark Selby	4
(Thailand) Noppon Saengkham	5
(China) Xiao Guodong	5
(England) Anthony Hamilton	3
(England) Kyren Wilson	4
(England) Jack Lisowski	5
(England) Joe Perry	1
(Wales) Mark Williams	5

Quarter-finals; Best of 9 frames
(Hong Kong) Marco Fu	3
(England) David Gilbert	5
(England) Barry Hawkins	5
(England) Gary Wilson	3
(Thailand) Noppon Saengkham	5
(China) Xiao Guodong	1
(England) Jack Lisowski	3
(Wales) Mark Williams	5

Semi-finals; Best of 11 frames
(England) David Gilbert	6
(England) Barry Hawkins	4
(Thailand) Noppon Saengkham	5
(Wales) Mark Williams	6

Final; Best of 19 frames
(England) David Gilbert	9
(Wales) Mark Williams	10

== Final ==
Final: Best of 19 frames; Referee: Peggy Li. Yushan No.1 Middle School, Yushan, China, 12 August 2018.
David Gilbert; England	9–10	Mark Williams; Wales
Afternoon: 72–45, 76–22, 0–96, 90–0, 0–121 (121), 142–0 (142), 12–76, 24–68, 69–0; Evening: 68–58, 95–0, 95–38, 15–77, 103–27, 39–80, 16–64, 45–71, 0–81, 18–72
142	Highest break	121
1	Century breaks	1

== Qualifying ==
These matches were held between 6 and 9 July 2018 at the Preston Guild Hall in Preston, England. All matches were best of 9 frames.

(China) Ding Junhui	5–4 (Note: Match was held over and played in Yushan)	(Thailand) James Wattana
(China) Xu Si	4–5	(China) Yuan Sijun
(England) Robert Milkins	5–0	(China) Chen Zifan
(China) Li Hang	4–5	(England) David Lilley
(Hong Kong) Marco Fu	5–0	(Scotland) Chris Totten
(England) Peter Ebdon	5–3	(Wales) Jamie Clarke
(China) Liang Wenbo	1–5	(England) James Cahill
(England) Andrew Higginson	5–3	(China) Luo Honghao
(Wales) Matthew Stevens	5–0	(England) Allan Taylor
(England) David Gilbert	5–1	(China) Niu Zhuang
(England) Rory McLeod	5–3	(Malaysia) Thor Chuan Leong
(England) Ali Carter	5–0	(Egypt) Basem Eltahhan
(Wales) Dominic Dale	5–4	(England) Hammad Miah
(England) Ricky Walden	5–2	(Northern Ireland) Joe Swail
(Wales) Daniel Wells	2–5	(Hong Kong) Andy Lee
(Australia) Neil Robertson	5–0	(China) He Guoqiang
(England) Barry Hawkins	5–2	(England) Alfie Burden
(Thailand) Sunny Akani	5–0	(China) Fan Zhengyi
(England) Michael Holt	5–2	(England) John Astley
(England) Mark Davis	5–1	(England) Sam Baird
(Scotland) Anthony McGill	1–5	(Wales) Lee Walker
(England) Matthew Selt	5–3	(England) Joe O'Connor
(China) Yan Bingtao	5–3	(England) Ashley Carty
(England) Stuart Carrington	5–2	(Wales) Duane Jones
(Republic of Ireland) Fergal O'Brien	5–3	(Finland) Robin Hull
(Scotland) Graeme Dott	3–5	(China) Zhao Xintong
(Scotland) Scott Donaldson	5–1	(England) Sanderson Lam
(Belgium) Luca Brecel	5–1	(England) Ian Burns
(England) Gary Wilson	5–1	(England) Jimmy White
(England) Tom Ford	5–4	(Thailand) Dechawat Poomjaeng
(England) Martin O'Donnell	5–1	(Iran) Soheil Vahedi
(England) Judd Trump	5–0	(Wales) Kishan Hirani
(England) Mark Selby	5–3	(England) Luke Simmonds
(Northern Ireland) Gerard Greene	0–5	(England) Elliot Slessor
(China) Zhou Yuelong	5–3	(England) Adam Duffy
(Wales) Jamie Jones	w/o–w/d	(England) Sam Craigie
(Wales) Ryan Day	5–4	(Scotland) Ross Muir
(England) Robbie Williams	5–4	(England) Oliver Lines
(England) Mark King	4–5	(England) Rod Lawler
(Thailand) Noppon Saengkham	5–2	(England) Sean O'Sullivan
(Cyprus) Michael Georgiou	5–1	(Northern Ireland) Jordan Brown
(China) Xiao Guodong	5–2	(China) Zhang Yong
(England) Liam Highfield	4–5	(Wales) Jak Jones
(England) Stuart Bingham	4–5	(China) Zhang Anda
(England) Mark Joyce	5–2	(China) Chen Feilong
(England) Anthony Hamilton	5–1	(Scotland) Rhys Clark
(Republic of Ireland) Ken Doherty	2–5	(Germany) Simon Lichtenberg
(England) Shaun Murphy	4–5	(China) Mei Xiwen
(England) Kyren Wilson	5–3	(England) Nigel Bond
(Scotland) Alan McManus	2–5	(England) Paul Davison
(Wales) Michael White	4–5	(England) Harvey Chandler
(Norway) Kurt Maflin	5–1	(China) Lu Ning
(Northern Ireland) Mark Allen	5–2	(England) Peter Lines
(China) Lyu Haotian	5–1	(Scotland) Eden Sharav
(England) Jack Lisowski	5–2	(China) Zhang Jiankang
(England) Chris Wakelin	5–3	(England) Craig Steadman
(England) Mike Dunn	5–0	(China) Luo Zetao
(England) Joe Perry	5–3	(China) Li Yuan
(Thailand) Thepchaiya Un-Nooh	5–1	(England) Billy Joe Castle
(Scotland) Stephen Maguire	5–4	(Poland) Adam Stefanow
(England) Ben Woollaston	5–1	(China) Bai Langning
(England) Jimmy Robertson	4–5	(China) Chang Bingyu
(Switzerland) Alexander Ursenbacher	5–4	(China) Tian Pengfei
(Wales) Mark Williams	5–4	(Germany) Lukas Kleckers

== Century breaks ==
=== Televised stage centuries ===
Total: 49

- 142, 140, 122, 101 – David Gilbert
- 142, 111 – Noppon Saengkham
- 132, 114, 110, 109, 106, 103 – Neil Robertson
- 128 – Michael Holt
- 124, 101 – Barry Hawkins
- 121, 120, 104 – Mark Williams
- 121, 111 – Fergal O'Brien
- 120 – Ali Carter
- 118, 118, 103 – Marco Fu
- 115, 100 – Jack Lisowski
- 115, 103 – Anthony Hamilton
- 115 – Ding Junhui
- 113, 112, 104, 103 – Gary Wilson
- 112 – Mike Dunn
- 111, 101 – Xiao Guodong
- 109 – Stephen Maguire
- 108 – David Lilley
- 107 – Ryan Day
- 107 – Kyren Wilson
- 105 – Elliot Slessor
- 103 – Mark Allen
- 103 – Harvey Chandler
- 102 – Mark Selby
- 102 – James Wattana
- 102 – Jak Jones
- 101 – Mark Davis
- 100 – Andrew Higginson
- 100 – Jamie Jones

=== Qualifying stage centuries ===
Total: 14

- 140 – Robbie Williams
- 133 – David Gilbert
- 131, 109, 108 – Noppon Saengkham
- 124 – Peter Ebdon
- 121 – Judd Trump
- 118, 102 – Fergal O'Brien
- 118 – Marco Fu
- 109 – Mark Joyce
- 108 – Joe Perry
- 104 – Ricky Walden
- 102 – Mark Allen
