= Gary Wilson (snooker player) =

English snooker player (born 1985)

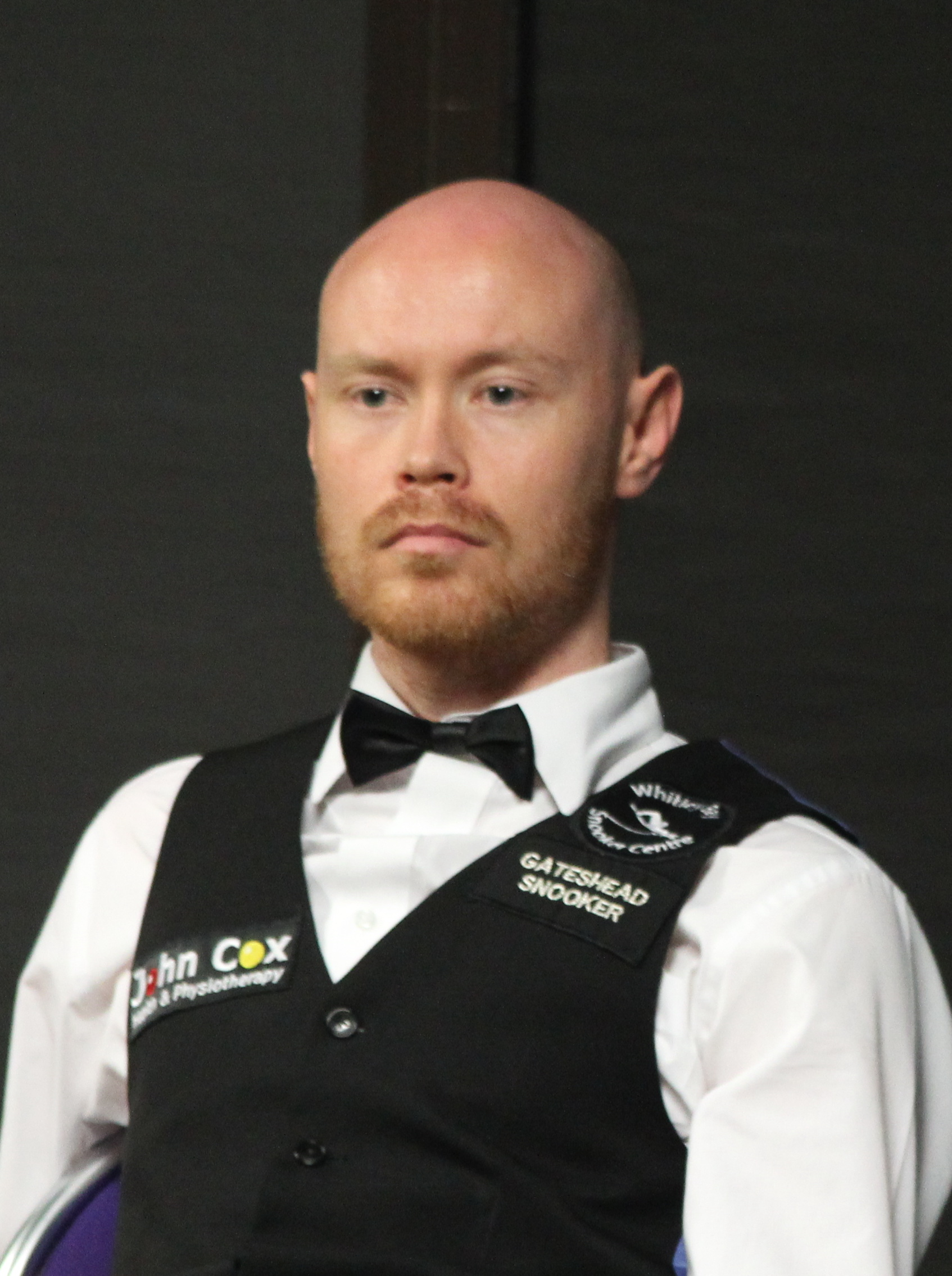
- Wilson at the 2016 Paul Hunter Classic

Personal information
- Nickname: The Tyneside Terror
- Born: 11 August 1985 (age 41) Wallsend, England

Sport
- Country: England
- Sport: Snooker
- Professional: 2004–2006, 2013–present
- Highest ranking: 10 (April 2024)
- Current ranking: 28 (as of 7 November 2026)
- Maximum breaks: 6
- Century breaks: 311 (as of 19 November 2026)

Tournament wins
- Ranking: 3

Gary Wilson (born 11 August 1985) is an English professional snooker player from Wallsend in North Tyneside, Tyne and Wear.

After showing promise from a young age, Wilson won the IBSF World U-21 Championship before turning professional in 2004. He dropped off the tour in 2006, however, and did not regain his professional status until 2013. During his second period as an amateur, Wilson won the English Amateur Championship in 2012 and reached the final of the World Amateur Championship the same year.

Noted for his cue ball control and break-building ability, Wilson has won three ranking titles, the Scottish Open in 2022 and 2023, and the 2024 Welsh Open. He was also runner-up at the 2015 China Open and the 2021 British Open, as well as reaching the semi-final of the 2019 World Championship as a qualifier.

== Career ==
=== Early career ===
Wilson started playing snooker aged three and soon started showing promise. At the age of 8 he had already been put into a team performing in the local league, despite some clubs refusing to allow a child to play. Aged 9, he made his first century, and appeared for the first time at the BBC1's snooker game show series Junior Big Break: Stars of the Future (he would make two more appearances on the show). He played exhibition matches with John Parrott and Willie Thorne, and defeated Jimmy White and Ronnie O'Sullivan in level matches. Wilson went on to win a number of national titles, including the UK Under-18 championship twice, and was widely regarded as one of the most promising junior players in the country.

In 2003, Wilson made his international debut at the European U-19's Championship in Latvia. The same year he started his professional career by playing Challenge Tour, the second-level professional tour at the time, and won the fourth event in 2004 to finish fourth in the rankings and secure his place on the main tour for 2004–05 season. Wilson's biggest achievement that year, however, was the victory at the World Under-21 Snooker Championship in Ireland. Having won all seven of his round robin matches while dropping only two frames, he went all the way to the final, defeating the likes of Pankaj Advani, Aditya Mehta and Liang Wenbo. In the final Wilson saw off Kobkit Palajin with breaks of 142 and 135 to win 11–5.

In his debut season Wilson reached the last 48 of the Irish Masters and last 64 of the China Open. These results were just enough to ensure that he would remain on tour for another year. The next season, Wilson reached the last 64 stage twice, but the rest of his performances were unsuccessful, and following defeat to James Tatton in the World Championship qualifying, he fell off the tour. In 2013 Wilson commented: "At the end of it, when you looked at the rankings it was only by one match and I was gutted. The thing is, at the time, and this is not an excuse, the game was nowhere near as popular as now. It was going through a really bad patch and there were only six tournaments in all compared to now when there are 20–25 tournaments per season. It meant if you had two bad tournaments and you were not doing too well you did not have much time to recover. It is so different now."

=== Amateur years and return to main tour ===
Wilson was to spend the next four years attempting to regain his tour place via the PIOS tour, having come close to finishing inside the top 8 on several occasions. He was forced to start working as a taxi driver at the time to make a living.

Following the introduction of the Q School, Wilson again came close to winning a tour card, reaching the fourth round twice in 2011 and once in 2012. He also took part in the 2012 IBSF World Championship in Bulgaria, having finished top of the English amateur rankings. He reached the final but lost 8–10 to Muhammad Asif. During the 2011–12 season Wilson entered a number of PTC events, defeating the likes of Peter Ebdon and Marco Fu, and reaching the last 32 twice. The next season was even better, as he performed consistently and reached the last 16 of Scottish Open; as a result he finished third among the amateur players on the Order of Merit, and finally regained his tour place after seven years. Wilson said, "I knew if I went quite far in that last event I would be able to turn professional off that, so losing the world amateur final did not end my dreams".

=== 2013–14 season ===
Wilson had one of the strongest starts to the season among the new players on tour. In the first tournament, the Wuxi Classic, he defeated James Wattana to qualify for his second ever venue appearance; there he would lose in a deciding frame to David Morris. After failing to qualify for both the Australian Open and the Shanghai Masters, Wilson had his best result to date at the inaugural Indian Open, defeating Jimmy White, Dominic Dale and Marco Fu on the way to the last 16, where he lost again in the deciding frame, this time to Michael White. Following his first round defeat at the International Championship to Wattana, Wilson went on to reach the last 32 of both the UK Championship and the German Masters. During the qualifying match for the latter tournament against Ricky Walden in December, Wilson made his first maximum break in professional competition. He also performed successfully at the European Tour events, winning his first round matches at every tournament. The highlight was his first ever semi-final at the Rotterdam Open where he was leading eventual tournament winner Mark Williams 3–1 but lost 4–3. Thanks to these performances, Wilson finished 24th on the Order of Merit to qualify for the Finals, where he was whitewashed 4–0 by Fu. Wilson's season came to a disappointing end as he was beaten 10–4 by James Cahill in the opening round of World Championship qualifying. However, he had made enough money during the year to give up his taxi driver job and concentrate on playing snooker full-time in the future.

=== 2014–15 season ===
Wilson qualified for the 2014 Wuxi Classic, the opening ranking event of the season, where he lost 5–3 to Alan McManus in the first round. He couldn't regain his momentum from last year as he failed to progress beyond the last 64 stage of any tournament in the first half of the season. Wilson's breakthrough came in February at the Welsh Open, as he defeated Zhang Anda, John Astley and Joe Perry. He then knocked out Neil Robertson 4–2 to reach his first major quarter-final, stating afterwards that he had proven that he could handle the big occasions. Wilson took an early 2–1 lead against Ben Woollaston, but lost four frames in a row to be beaten 5–2. In the opening round of the Indian Open, Wilson was edged out 4–3 by Adam Duffy.

At the China Open, Wilson eliminated Liang Wenbo 5–3, Ricky Walden 5–2 and Dechawat Poomjaeng 5–1 to play in his second ranking event quarter-final in under two months. Despite defeating Barry Hawkins 5–3, Wilson said that he was struggling with his game but hoped to find his form in the semi-finals against home favourite and reigning champion Ding Junhui. He fell 3–1 down, but moved 5–3 ahead with four breaks of 50 or above. Ding took the match into a deciding frame in which Wilson made a 72 to set up a meeting with reigning world champion Mark Selby in the final, in which Wilson was heavily beaten 10–2. Wilson said later that he didn't feel the occasion got to him, but simply missed the majority of chances that came his way and cued across the ball many times. His last match of the season was a 10–7 loss to Li Hang in the second round of World Championship qualifying. Wilson's successful year resulted in him increasing his ranking by 34 places in 12 months to end the season as 34th in the world.

=== 2015–16 season ===
Wilson could not build on last year's exploits during the 2015–16 season. He lost in the qualifiers for the first three ranking events. He beat Martin O'Donnell 6–3 at the UK Championship, before being defeated 6–4 by Martin Gould in the second round. Wilson reached the same stage of the Welsh Open, but lost 4–1 to Liang Wenbo. He qualified for the China Open, but he was knocked out 5–3 by Stephen Maguire in the opening round.

=== 2016–17 season ===
At the Indian Open, Wilson overcame Zhao Xintong 4–1 and Anthony Hamilton 4–2, but lost 4–2 to Akani Songsermsawad. His only last 16 appearance of the season came at the Northern Ireland Open, courtesy of knocking out Peter Lines 4–0, Andrew Higginson 4–3 and Sam Baird 4–3, before he was defeated 4–3 by Mark Allen. Wilson qualified for the China Open and beat Graeme Dott 5–3, but then was beaten 5–1 by Shaun Murphy.

Wilson qualified for the 2017 World Championship. Making his second 147 in the fourth frame of his first round qualifier against Josh Boileau, he edged through 10–9. In the second qualifying round he defeated Peter Lines 10–7, then Michael White 10–3. In his three matches he made eight centuries, more than double that of any other player. He rated the achievement of qualifying bigger than reaching the final of the China Open in 2015. On his debut in the event he played Ronnie O'Sullivan, and rallied from 5–1 to be down only 5–4 after the first session. He fell 9–5 behind, before winning two frames in a row, but O'Sullivan then got the frame he needed to progress 10–7. Wilson made two century breaks during the match.

=== 2017–18 season ===
Wilson was a quarter-finalist at the 2017 Paul Hunter Classic, but lost 4–2 to Jamie Jones. In the second half of the season, he made it to the semi-finals of the 2018 Welsh Open, where he was defeated 6–2 by John Higgins.

=== 2018–19 season ===
Early in the season, Wilson made two quarter-final appearances, at the non-ranking Haining Open, and right after that at the ranking World Open. At the 2019 Snooker World Championship Wilson defeated Luca Brecel, Mark Selby and Ali Carter before losing 17–11 to eventual winner Judd Trump in the semi-finals.

=== 2019–20 season ===
Wilson reached a quarter- and a semi-final in both the first and the second half of the season. In August, in the quarter-final stage of the 2019 International Championship he faced Mark Selby, who narrowly knocked him out by the scoreline of 6–5. A month later, Wilson reached the semi-final of the 2019 Six-red World Championship, losing to Stephen Maguire 7–5. At the start of the next year, Wilson suffered another 6–5 defeat, this time by Zhou Yuelong, at the 2020 European Masters semi-final. Next month he exited the 2020 World Grand Prix at the quarter-finals, losing to Tom Ford 5–2.

=== 2020–21 season ===
At the WST Pro Series, Wilson made his third career maximum break when he was playing against Liam Highfield in the group stage. This was the first maximum break in the history of the event.

=== 2021–22 season ===
Wilson was a runner-up to Mark Williams at the 2021 British Open, losing by the scoreline of 4–6. This was Wilson's second ranking final appearance. At the 2021 UK Championship, he made his fourth maximum break in his first round match against Ian Burns.

=== 2022–23 season: first ranking title ===
Wilson secured his first ranking title at the 2022 Scottish Open, defeating Joe O'Connor 9–2 in the final. He also made it to the quarter-finals of the 2023 Players Championship by beating Ding Junhui 6–3, but there he suffered a 1–6 loss to Kyren Wilson.

=== 2023–24 season: second and third ranking titles ===
Wilson successfully defended his title at the 2023 Scottish Open, with a 9–5 victory over Noppon Saengkham in the final, then went on and also won the last tournament in the Home Nations Series, the 2024 Welsh Open, beating Martin O'Donnell 9–4. This made him the third player, after Mark Selby and Judd Trump, to win two Home Nations events in one season. During the Welsh Open, Wilson made his fifth maximum break in the second frame of his semi-final match against John Higgins, after attempting a maximum in the first frame already. He was a quarter-finalist at the 2024 World Grand Prix as well, but lost 1–5 to Ronnie O'Sullivan, the eventual winner of the tournament. Wilson's result was the same at the 2024 Players Championship, being defeated 4–6 by Mark Allen. In the 2024 Tour Championship he made it to the semi-final stage, where once again he faced O'Sullivan and lost to him 7–10. At the 2024 World Championship, Wilson lost in the first round to Stuart Bingham 5‍–‍10.

=== 2024‍–‍25 season ===
In the last 32 of the 2024 UK Championship, Wilson was beaten 1‍–‍6 by Michael Holt. At the 2025 Masters, Wilson lost in the first round to Shaun Murphy 3‍–‍6. Afterwards he said "My game's shot" as he revealed his frustrations with his recent form.

=== 2025‍–‍26 season ===
In August, Wilson reached the final of the Wuhan Open where he was defeated in a final-frame decider 9‍–‍10 by Xiao Guodong.

== Performance and rankings timeline ==
Tournament	2003/ 04	2004/ 05	2005/ 06	2011/ 12	2012/ 13	2013/ 14	2014/ 15	2015/ 16	2016/ 17	2017/ 18	2018/ 19	2019/ 20		2020/ 21	2021/ 22	2022/ 23	2023/ 24	2024/ 25	2025/ 26	2026/ 27
Ranking (Note: From the 2010/2011 season it shows the ranking at the beginning of the season)	(Note: He was an amateur)	(Note: New players on the Main Tour don't have a ranking)	79				68	34	42	57	40	20		18	33	33	14	11	18	24
Ranking tournaments
Championship League	Not Held			Non-Ranking Event										RR	RR	2R	RR	2R	RR	2R
China Open	NH	LQ	LQ	A	A	1R	F	1R	2R	3R	1R	Tournament Not Held								LQ
Wuhan Open	Tournament Not Held																LQ	1R	F	1R
British Open	A	LQ	Tournament Not Held												F	2R	2R	LQ	2R	LQ
English Open	Tournament Not Held								1R	2R	1R	4R		4R	1R	1R	2R	1R	2R	1R
Shenzhen Open (Note: The event was called the Xi'an Grand Prix (2024/2025–2025/2026))	Tournament Not Held																	2R	SF	1R
Northern Ireland Open	Tournament Not Held								4R	4R	3R	1R		1R	2R	LQ	2R	1R	3R	1R
International Championship	Tournament Not Held				A	1R	LQ	LQ	1R	1R	LQ	QF		Not Held			2R	QF	2R	1R
UK Championship	A	LQ	LQ	A	A	3R	1R	2R	1R	1R	3R	4R		1R	2R	LQ	LQ	1R	1R	
Shoot Out	Not Held			Non-Ranking Event					1R	2R	3R	1R		1R	2R	3R	1R	2R	3R	
Scottish Open (Note: The event was called the Players Championship (2003/2004))	A	Not Held			MR	Not Held			2R	2R	1R	2R		1R	2R	W	W	1R	1R	
German Masters	Not Held			A	A	2R	LQ	A	LQ	2R	LQ	2R		LQ	LQ	LQ	LQ	1R	LQ	
Welsh Open	A	LQ	LQ	A	A	1R	QF	2R	1R	SF	2R	2R		2R	1R	LQ	W	1R	2R	
World Grand Prix	Tournament Not Held						NR	DNQ	DNQ	DNQ	1R	QF		DNQ	1R	1R	QF	1R	1R	
Players Championship (Note: The event was called the Players Tour Championship Grand Final (2011/2012–2015/2016))	Not Held			DNQ	DNQ	1R	DNQ	DNQ	DNQ	DNQ	DNQ	DNQ		DNQ	1R	QF	QF	DNQ	DNQ	
World Open (Note: The event was called the LG Cup (2003/2004) and the Grand Prix (2004/2005–2005/2006))	A	LQ	1R	A	A	LQ	Not Held		1R	1R	QF	LQ		Not Held			LQ	1R	QF	
Tour Championship	Tournament Not Held										DNQ	DNQ		DNQ	DNQ	DNQ	SF	DNQ	DNQ	
World Championship	LQ	LQ	LQ	A	A	LQ	LQ	LQ	1R	LQ	SF	LQ		1R	LQ	2R	1R	LQ	1R	
Non-ranking tournaments
Shanghai Masters	Not Held			Ranking Event							A	A		Not Held			1R	1R	A	A
Champion of Champions	Tournament Not Held					A	A	A	A	A	A	A		A	A	A	1R	1R	A	
The Masters	LQ	A	LQ	A	A	A	A	A	A	A	A	A		1R	A	A	A	1R	1R	
Championship League	Not Held			A	A	A	A	A	A	A	A	2R	2R	RR	RR	RR	RR	RR	RR	
Former ranking tournaments
Irish Masters	A	LQ	Tournament Not Held																	
Wuxi Classic	Not Held			NR	A	1R	1R	Tournament Not Held												
Australian Goldfields Open	Not Held			A	A	LQ	LQ	LQ	Tournament Not Held											
Shanghai Masters	Not Held			A	A	LQ	LQ	LQ	LQ	1R	Non-Ranking			Not Held			Non-Ranking Event			
Paul Hunter Classic	NH	Pro-am		Minor-Ranking Event					2R	QF	2R	NR		Tournament Not Held						
Indian Open	Tournament Not Held					3R	1R	NH	3R	2R	1R	Tournament Not Held								
Riga Masters (Note: The event was called the Riga Open (2014/2015–2015/2016))	Tournament Not Held						Minor-Rank		1R	1R	LQ	3R		Tournament Not Held						
China Championship	Tournament Not Held								NR	LQ	2R	LQ		Tournament Not Held						
WST Pro Series	Tournament Not Held													RR	Tournament Not Held					
Turkish Masters	Tournament Not Held														LQ	Tournament Not Held				
Gibraltar Open	Tournament Not Held							MR	2R	2R	4R	1R		1R	2R	Tournament Not Held				
WST Classic	Tournament Not Held															SF	Tournament Not Held			
European Masters (Note: The event was called the European Open (2003/2004) and the Malta Cup (2004/2005–2005/2006))	A	LQ	LQ	Tournament Not Held					LQ	LQ	2R	SF		WD	1R	2R	LQ	Not Held		
Saudi Arabia Masters	Tournament Not Held																	6R	5R	NH
Former non-ranking tournaments
General Cup (Note: The event was called the General Cup International (2004/2005–2011/2012))	NH	RR	NH	A	A	A	A	A	Tournament Not Held											
Shoot Out	Not Held			A	A	A	1R	3R	Ranking Event											
Paul Hunter Classic	NH	Pro-am		Minor-Ranking Event					Ranking Event			1R		Tournament Not Held						
Six-red World Championship	Tournament Not Held				A	3R	A	A	A	A	A	SF		Not Held		LQ	Tournament Not Held			
Haining Open	Tournament Not Held						Minor-Rank		A	1R	QF	A		NH	A	A	Tournament Not Held			

Performance Table Legend
LQ	lost in the qualifying draw	#R	lost in the early rounds of the tournament (WR = Wildcard round, RR = Round robin)	QF	lost in the quarter-finals
SF	lost in the semi–finals	F	lost in the final	W	won the tournament
DNQ	did not qualify for the tournament	A	did not participate in the tournament	WD	withdrew from the tournament

NH / Not Held	means an event was not held.
NR / Non-Ranking Event	means an event is/was no longer a ranking event.
R / Ranking Event	means an event is/was a ranking event.
MR / Minor-Ranking Event	means an event is/was a minor-ranking event.
PA / Pro-am Event	means an event is/was a pro-am event.

== Career finals ==
=== Ranking finals: 6 (3 titles) ===
Outcome	No.	Year	Championship	Opponent in the final	Score
Runner-up	1.	2015	China Open	(England) Mark Selby	2–10
Runner-up	2.	2021	British Open	(Wales) Mark Williams	4–6
Winner	1.	2022	Scottish Open	(England) Joe O'Connor	9–2
Winner	2.	2023	Scottish Open (2)	(Thailand) Noppon Saengkham	9–5
Winner	3.	2024	Welsh Open	(England) Martin O'Donnell	9–4
Runner-up	3.	2025	Wuhan Open	(China) Xiao Guodong	9–10

=== Non-ranking finals: 2 (1 title) ===
Outcome	No.	Year	Championship	Opponent in the final	Score
Runner-up	1.	2003	Challenge Tour – Event 2	(Scotland) Hugh Abernethy	0–6
Winner	1.	2004	Challenge Tour – Event 4	(China) Jin Long	6–4

=== Team finals: 1 ===
Outcome	No.	Year	Championship	Team/partner	Opponent(s) in the final	Score
Runner-up	1.	2007	World Mixed Doubles Championship	(England) Pam Wood	(England) Joe Perry (England) Leah Willett	1–3

=== Amateur finals: 6 (5 titles) ===
Outcome	No.	Year	Championship	Opponent in the final	Score
Winner	1.	2002	English Under-18 Championship	(England) Matthew Selt	8–5
Winner	2.	2003	English Under-18 Championship (2)	(England) Jamie O'Neill	8–4
Winner	3.	2004	IBSF World Under-21 Championship	(Thailand) Kobkit Palajin	11–5
Winner	4.	2012	English Amateur Championship	(England) Martin O'Donnell	10–9
Winner	5.	2012	EBSA Qualifying Tour – Belgium	(England) Elliot Slessor	3–0
Runner–up	1.	2012	IBSF World Snooker Championship	(Pakistan) Muhammad Asif	8–10
