= 2017 World Open (snooker) =

World Open
Tournament information
- Dates: 18–24 September 2017
- Venue: Yushan No.1 Middle School
- City: Yushan
- Country: China
- Organisation: World Snooker
- Format: Ranking event
- Total prize fund: £700,000
- Winner's share: £150,000
- Highest break: Li Hang (CHN) (143)

Final
- Champion: Ding Junhui (CHN)
- Runner-up: Kyren Wilson (ENG)
- Score: 10–3

The 2017 Yushan World Open was a professional ranking snooker tournament that took place between 18 and 24 September 2017 in Yushan, China. It was the fifth ranking event of the 2017/2018 season.

Qualifying took place between 6–9 August in Preston.

Ali Carter was the defending champion but he chose not to participate.

Ding Junhui won his 13th ranking title, defeating Kyren Wilson 10–3 in the final. It was Ding's first ranking event win since the 2016 Shanghai Masters, a year earlier.

== Prize fund ==
The breakdown of prize money for this year is shown below:

- Winner: £150,000
- Runner-up: £75,000
- Semi-final: £32,000
- Quarter-final: £18,000
- Last 16: £12,000
- Last 32: £7,000
- Last 64: £4,000
- Highest break: £3,000
- Total: £700,000

The "rolling 147 prize" for a maximum break stood at £30,000.

== Main draw ==
Last 64; Best of 9 frames
(England) Mark Selby	2
(Wales) Lee Walker	5
(England) Robert Milkins	5
(Wales) Jamie Jones	1
(Scotland) Anthony McGill	5
(Wales) Duane Jones	2
(Scotland) Stephen Maguire	5
(Republic of Ireland) Ken Doherty	2
(China) Cao Yupeng	5
(China) Ma Chunmao	0
(England) Alfie Burden	2
(England) Stuart Bingham	5
(England) Mike Dunn	1
(Belgium) Luca Brecel	5
(Wales) Daniel Wells	5
(England) Shaun Murphy	3
(Hong Kong) Marco Fu	5
(England) Ian Burns	3
(Scotland) Graeme Dott	2
(England) Peter Ebdon	5
(China) Liang Wenbo	4
(China) Li Hang	5
(England) Ricky Walden	5
(England) Andrew Higginson	1
(China) Yu Delu	4
(England) Joe Perry	5
(England) Gary Wilson	1
(Wales) Ryan Day	5
(China) Xiao Guodong	5
(Wales) Dominic Dale	1
(China) Zhang Anda	3
(China) Ding Junhui	5
(England) Sam Craigie	4
(England) John Astley	5
(England) Tom Ford	3
(England) Jimmy Robertson	5
(Wales) Mark Williams	5
(Wales) Matthew Stevens	0
(England) Mark King	3
(China) Chen Zhe	5
(England) Mark Joyce	3
(England) Michael Holt	5
(Iran) Hossein Vafaei	w/d
(England) Kyren Wilson	w/o
(Thailand) Thepchaiya Un-Nooh	5
(China) Hu Hao	2
(England) Chris Wakelin	5
(England) Barry Hawkins	4
(Australia) Neil Robertson	5
(Thailand) Noppon Saengkham	1
(England) Ben Woollaston	5
(Scotland) Eden Sharav	4
(Northern Ireland) Mark Allen	5
(England) Oliver Lines	1
(England) Allan Taylor	5
(Cyprus) Michael Georgiou	1
(China) Tian Pengfei	4
(England) David Gilbert	5
(England) Jack Lisowski	1
(England) Martin Gould	5
(England) Matthew Selt	5
(England) Elliot Slessor	2
(Switzerland) Alexander Ursenbacher	0
(Scotland) John Higgins	5

Last 32; Best of 9 frames
(Wales) Lee Walker	5
(England) Robert Milkins	2
(Scotland) Anthony McGill	5
(Scotland) Stephen Maguire	4
(China) Cao Yupeng	5
(England) Stuart Bingham	4
(Belgium) Luca Brecel	5
(Wales) Daniel Wells	4
(Hong Kong) Marco Fu	3
(England) Peter Ebdon	5
(China) Li Hang	5
(England) Ricky Walden	3
(England) Joe Perry	5
(Wales) Ryan Day	0
(China) Xiao Guodong	0
(China) Ding Junhui	5
(England) John Astley	2
(England) Jimmy Robertson	5
(Wales) Mark Williams	5
(China) Chen Zhe	0
(England) Michael Holt	3
(England) Kyren Wilson	5
(Thailand) Thepchaiya Un-Nooh	5
(England) Chris Wakelin	2
(Australia) Neil Robertson	5
(England) Ben Woollaston	4
(Northern Ireland) Mark Allen	5
(England) Allan Taylor	2
(England) David Gilbert	5
(England) Martin Gould	2
(England) Matthew Selt	4
(Scotland) John Higgins	5

Last 16; Best of 9 frames
(Wales) Lee Walker	0
(Scotland) Anthony McGill	5
(China) Cao Yupeng	4
(Belgium) Luca Brecel	5
(England) Peter Ebdon	3
(China) Li Hang	5
(England) Joe Perry	1
(China) Ding Junhui	5
(England) Jimmy Robertson	1
(Wales) Mark Williams	5
(England) Kyren Wilson	5
(Thailand) Thepchaiya Un-Nooh	3
(Australia) Neil Robertson	4
(Northern Ireland) Mark Allen	5
(England) David Gilbert	5
(Scotland) John Higgins	2

Quarter-finals; Best of 9 frames
(Scotland) Anthony McGill	4
(Belgium) Luca Brecel	5
(China) Li Hang	3
(China) Ding Junhui	5
(Wales) Mark Williams	1
(England) Kyren Wilson	5
(Northern Ireland) Mark Allen	5
(England) David Gilbert	1

Semi-finals; Best of 11 frames
(Belgium) Luca Brecel	4
(China) Ding Junhui	6
(England) Kyren Wilson	6
(Northern Ireland) Mark Allen	5

Final; Best of 19 frames
(China) Ding Junhui	10
(England) Kyren Wilson	3

== Final ==
Final: Best of 19 frames. Referee: Xie Yixin. Yushan No.1 Middle School, Yushan, China, 24 September 2017.
Ding Junhui; China	10–3	Kyren Wilson; England
Afternoon: 88–28, 1–71 (67), 61–16, 75–8 (67), 93–7 (93), 70–43 (58), 70–23, 0–104 (104), 8–79 (66); Evening: 67–14 (67), 107–6 (69), 71–14 (71), 67–61 (Ding 54)
93	Highest break	104
0	Century breaks	1
7	50+ breaks	3

== Qualifying ==
These matches were held between 6 and 9 August 2017 at the Preston Guild Hall in Preston, England. All matches were best of 9 frames.

(England) Mark Selby	5–2 (Note: Match was held over and played in Yushan.)	(Thailand) Kritsanut Lertsattayathorn
(Wales) Lee Walker	5–1	(England) Paul Davison
(England) Robert Milkins	5–4	(Wales) Jak Jones
(Wales) Jamie Jones	5–2	(Republic of Ireland) Josh Boileau
(Scotland) Anthony McGill	5–4	(China) Zhao Xintong
(Norway) Kurt Maflin	3–5	(Wales) Duane Jones
(Scotland) Stephen Maguire	5–1	(Australia) Matthew Bolton
(England) Robbie Williams	3–5	(Republic of Ireland) Ken Doherty
(England) David Grace	0–5	(China) Cao Yupeng
(Wales) Michael White	1–5	(China) Ma Chunmao (Note: Wildcard)
(England) Alfie Burden	5–1	(England) Craig Steadman
(England) Stuart Bingham	5–1	(China) Mei Xiwen
(England) Mike Dunn	5–0	(Iran) Soheil Vahedi
(Belgium) Luca Brecel	5–4	(Scotland) Ross Muir
(Wales) Daniel Wells	5–3	(Northern Ireland) Gerard Greene
(England) Shaun Murphy	5–1	(Malta) Alex Borg
(Hong Kong) Marco Fu	5–3	(England) Sean O'Sullivan
(Scotland) Scott Donaldson	0–5	(England) Ian Burns
(Scotland) Graeme Dott	w/o–w/d	(Pakistan) Hamza Akbar
(England) Peter Ebdon	5–4	(China) Niu Zhuang
(China) Liang Wenbo	5–4	(Thailand) Sunny Akani
(China) Li Hang	5–3	(Finland) Robin Hull
(England) Ricky Walden	5–2	(England) Jamie Curtis-Barrett
(England) Andrew Higginson	5–1	(England) Martin O'Donnell
(China) Yu Delu	5–2	(China) Zhang Yong
(England) Joe Perry	5–2	(Wales) Ian Preece
(England) Gary Wilson	5–1	(England) Nigel Bond
(Wales) Ryan Day	5–3	(England) Rod Lawler
(China) Xiao Guodong	5–3	(Germany) Lukas Kleckers
(Wales) Dominic Dale	5–0	(Wales) Jackson Page
(China) Zhang Anda	5–2	(China) Yuan Sijun
(China) Ding Junhui	5–1	(England) Hammad Miah

(England) Judd Trump	0–5	(England) Sam Craigie
(England) John Astley	5–1	(Scotland) Chris Totten
(England) Tom Ford	5–1	(Thailand) Boonyarit Keattikun
(England) Jimmy Robertson	5–2	(China) Luo Honghao
(Wales) Mark Williams	5–0	(England) Christopher Keogan
(Wales) Matthew Stevens	5–0	(Australia) Kurt Dunham
(England) Mark King	5–2	(China) Li Yuan
(England) Sam Baird	3–5	(China) Chen Zhe
(England) Mark Joyce	5–3	(India) Aditya Mehta
(England) Michael Holt	5–1	(England) Billy Joe Castle
(Iran) Hossein Vafaei	5–4	(England) Ashley Hugill
(England) Kyren Wilson	5–1	(Malaysia) Thor Chuan Leong
(Thailand) Thepchaiya Un-Nooh	5–1	(China) Fang Xiongman
(Scotland) Alan McManus	0–5	(China) Hu Hao
(England) Chris Wakelin	5–4	(Thailand) James Wattana
(England) Barry Hawkins	5–0	(Wales) David John
(Australia) Neil Robertson	5–1	(England) Sanderson Lam
(Thailand) Noppon Saengkham	5–3	(England) Adam Duffy
(England) Ben Woollaston	5–0	(England) Peter Lines
(England) Rory McLeod	4–5	(Scotland) Eden Sharav
(Northern Ireland) Mark Allen	5–1	(China) Wang Yuchen
(England) Oliver Lines	5–2	(China) Chen Zifan
(England) Anthony Hamilton	4–5	(England) Allan Taylor
(Republic of Ireland) Fergal O'Brien	0–5	(Cyprus) Michael Georgiou
(China) Tian Pengfei	5–1	(England) Jimmy White
(England) David Gilbert	5–1	(Scotland) Rhys Clark
(England) Jack Lisowski	5–4	(China) Xu Si
(England) Martin Gould	5–1	(China) Fan Zhengyi
(England) Matthew Selt	5–2	(England) Mitchell Mann
(England) Mark Davis	4–5	(England) Elliot Slessor
(England) Liam Highfield	3–5	(Switzerland) Alexander Ursenbacher
(Scotland) John Higgins	5–2	(Northern Ireland) Joe Swail

== Century breaks ==
=== Qualifying stage centuries ===
Total: 22

- 138 – Thepchaiya Un-Nooh
- 131 – Robin Hull
- 131 – Jamie Jones
- 129 – Barry Hawkins
- 126 – Xiao Guodong
- 120 – Cao Yupeng
- 116 – James Wattana
- 113 – Peter Ebdon
- 112 – Jack Lisowski
- 112 – Robert Milkins
- 110 – Matthew Stevens
- 109 – Oliver Lines
- 107 – Tom Ford
- 106 – Luca Brecel
- 105 – Stuart Bingham
- 104 – Ryan Day
- 102 – Zhang Anda
- 102 – Chen Zhe
- 101 – Fang Xiongman
- 100 – Alfie Burden
- 100 – Marco Fu
- 100 – Noppon Saengkham

=== Televised stage centuries ===
Total: 48

- 143, 127, 118, 102 – Li Hang
- 142, 142 – Thepchaiya Un-Nooh
- 142 – Jimmy Robertson
- 137 – Anthony McGill
- 136 – Marco Fu
- 135, 127, 127, 113, 104, 102 – Kyren Wilson
- 132, 130 – David Gilbert
- 132 – Duane Jones
- 129 – Peter Ebdon
- 129 – Michael Holt
- 128, 121, 110, 108 – Ding Junhui
- 126, 125 – John Higgins
- 126, 121, 108 – Mark Williams
- 123, 110 – John Astley
- 119, 101 – Sunny Akani
- 117, 105 – Luca Brecel
- 117 – Robert Milkins
- 117 – Elliot Slessor
- 114 – Joe Perry
- 114 – Chris Wakelin
- 112 – Eden Sharav
- 105, 103 – Mark Allen
- 105 – Stuart Bingham
- 105 – Yu Delu
- 105 – Tian Pengfei
- 103, 100 – Neil Robertson
- 103 – Matthew Selt
