= 2019 World Grand Prix (snooker) =

Snooker tournament

2019 Coral World Grand Prix

Tournament information
- Dates: 4–10 February 2019
- Venue: The Centaur
- City: Cheltenham
- Country: England
- Organisation: World Snooker
- Format: Ranking event
- Total prize fund: £375,000
- Winner's share: £100,000
- Highest break: Barry Hawkins (ENG) (143)

Final
- Champion: Judd Trump (ENG)
- Runner-up: Ali Carter (ENG)
- Score: 10–6

The 2019 World Grand Prix (officially the 2019 Coral World Grand Prix) was a professional snooker tournament that took place from 4 to 10 February 2019 at The Centaur, Cheltenham Racecourse in Cheltenham, England. It was the twelfth ranking event of the 2018/2019 season and a part of the newly created Coral Cup.

Judd Trump won his 10th ranking title, beating Ali Carter 10–6 in the final.

== Prize fund ==
The breakdown of prize money for this year is shown below:

- Winner: £100,000
- Runner-up: £40,000
- Semi-final: £20,000
- Quarter-final: £12,500
- Last 16: £7,500
- Last 32: £5,000
- Highest break: £5,000
- Total: £375,000

The "rolling 147 prize" for a maximum break: £10,000

== Seeding list ==
The top 32 players on the one-year ranking list, running from the 2018 Riga Masters until and including the 2019 German Masters, qualified for the tournament.

Rank	Player	Total points
1	(Northern Ireland) Mark Allen	353,000
2	(England) Ronnie O'Sullivan	220,000
3	(England) Mark Selby	218,000
4	(Wales) Mark Williams	201,000
5	(Australia) Neil Robertson	180,500
6	(England) Judd Trump	174,500
7	(England) Kyren Wilson	161,500
8	(England) David Gilbert	157,000
9	(England) Jack Lisowski	127,000
10	(England) Stuart Bingham	125,500
11	(England) Joe Perry	99,000
12	(England) Jimmy Robertson	98,225
13	(Scotland) Stephen Maguire	98,000
14	(Scotland) John Higgins	96,000
15	(England) Barry Hawkins	88,000
16	(England) Martin O'Donnell	76,500
17	(England) Ali Carter	72,500
18	(Wales) Ryan Day	70,500
19	(Thailand) Noppon Saengkham	68,000
20	(England) Mark King	65,500
21	(England) Mark Davis	62,725
22	(England) Tom Ford	62,500
23	(China) Zhao Xintong	60,500
24	(China) Ding Junhui	60,000
25	(China) Yan Bingtao	60,000
26	(Wales) Matthew Stevens	58,000
27	(England) Stuart Carrington	57,500
28	(China) Xiao Guodong	56,600
29	(China) Yuan Sijun	55,000
30	(England) Shaun Murphy	53,500
31	(Hong Kong) Marco Fu	53,500
32	(England) Gary Wilson	48,600

- Ranking points (prize money won in GBP)

== Tournament draw ==
Last 32; Best of 7 frames
1	(Northern Ireland) Mark Allen	4
32	(England) Gary Wilson	2
16	(England) Martin O'Donnell	3
17	(England) Ali Carter	4
9	(England) Jack Lisowski	1
24	(China) Ding Junhui	4
8	(England) David Gilbert	4
25	(China) Yan Bingtao	0
5	(Australia) Neil Robertson	3
28	(China) Xiao Guodong	4
12	(England) Jimmy Robertson	3
21	(England) Mark Davis	4
13	(Scotland) Stephen Maguire	4
20	(England) Mark King	1
4	(Wales) Mark Williams	3
29	(China) Yuan Sijun	4
3	(England) Mark Selby	4
30	(England) Shaun Murphy	1
14	(Scotland) John Higgins	2
19	(Thailand) Noppon Saengkham	4
11	(England) Joe Perry	3
22	(England) Tom Ford	4
6	(England) Judd Trump	4
27	(England) Stuart Carrington	3
7	(England) Kyren Wilson	4
26	(Wales) Matthew Stevens	3
10	(England) Stuart Bingham	4
23	(China) Zhao Xintong	1
15	(England) Barry Hawkins	4
18	(Wales) Ryan Day	1
2	(England) Ronnie O'Sullivan	2
31	(Hong Kong) Marco Fu	4

Last 16; Best of 7 frames
1	(Northern Ireland) Mark Allen	1
17	(England) Ali Carter	4
24	(China) Ding Junhui	0
8	(England) David Gilbert	4
28	(China) Xiao Guodong	4
21	(England) Mark Davis	1
13	(Scotland) Stephen Maguire	2
29	(China) Yuan Sijun	4
3	(England) Mark Selby	4
19	(Thailand) Noppon Saengkham	2
22	(England) Tom Ford	2
6	(England) Judd Trump	4
7	(England) Kyren Wilson	4
10	(England) Stuart Bingham	0
15	(England) Barry Hawkins	4
31	(Hong Kong) Marco Fu	1

Quarter-finals; Best of 9 frames
17	(England) Ali Carter	5
8	(England) David Gilbert	1
28	(China) Xiao Guodong	5
29	(China) Yuan Sijun	4
3	(England) Mark Selby	1
6	(England) Judd Trump	5
7	(England) Kyren Wilson	2
15	(England) Barry Hawkins	5

Semi-finals; Best of 11 frames
17	(England) Ali Carter	6
28	(China) Xiao Guodong	0
6	(England) Judd Trump	6
15	(England) Barry Hawkins	5

Final; Best of 19 frames
17	(England) Ali Carter	6
6	(England) Judd Trump	10

== Final ==
Final: Best of 19 frames. Referee: Olivier Marteel; The Centaur, Cheltenham Racecourse, Cheltenham, England, 10 February 2019.
Ali Carter (17); England	6–10	Judd Trump (6); England
Afternoon: 16–68, 73–59, 70–9, 4–125 (113), 2–71, 1–72, 8–106, 95–20, 0–132 (132); Evening: 133–0, 37–67, 83–0, 69–67, 13–72, 1–78, 1–54
99	Highest break	132
0	Century breaks	2

== Century breaks ==
Total: 25

- 143, 134, 130, 116 – Barry Hawkins
- 138, 118, 101, 101 – David Gilbert
- 138 – Mark Williams
- 132, 122, 113, 102, 100 – Judd Trump
- 131, 102 – Stuart Bingham
- 131, 100 – Yuan Sijun
- 127 – Ryan Day
- 126 – Ali Carter
- 126 – Ding Junhui
- 119 – Jimmy Robertson
- 108 – John Higgins
- 106 – Xiao Guodong
- 103 – Noppon Saengkham
