= 2022 English Open (snooker) =

Snooker tournament

2022 BetVictor English Open
Tournament information
- Dates: 12–18 December 2022
- Venue: Brentwood Centre
- City: Brentwood
- Country: England
- Organisation: World Snooker Tour
- Format: Ranking event
- Total prize fund: £427,000
- Winner's share: £80,000
- Highest break: Mark Williams (WAL) (147)

Final
- Champion: Mark Selby (ENG)
- Runner-up: Luca Brecel (BEL)
- Score: 9–6

The 2022 English Open (officially the 2022 BetVictor English Open) was a professional snooker tournament that took place from 12 to 18 December 2022 at the Brentwood Centre in Brentwood, England. The seventh ranking event of the 2022–23 season, it was the third tournament in the Home Nations Series, following the Northern Ireland Open and the Scottish Open and preceding the Welsh Open. It was the fourth of eight tournaments in the season's European Series. Qualifiers took place from 25 to 30 October at the Morningside Arena in Leicester, although matches involving the top 16 players in the world rankings were held over to be played at the final venue. Organised by the World Snooker Tour and sponsored by BetVictor, the tournament was broadcast by Eurosport in the UK and Europe. The winner received £80,000 from a total prize fund of £427,000.

On the first day of the tournament, the WPBSA suspended Yan Bingtao from professional competition, making him the seventh player suspended from the tour since October amid a major match-fixing investigation.

Neil Robertson was the defending champion, having defeated John Higgins 9–8 in the 2021 final. However, he was beaten 4–6 by Mark Selby in the semi-finals, meaning that he lost at the semi-final stage in each of the season's first three Home Nations events. Selby recorded his first win over Robertson in two years, after seven consecutive losses to him, and reached his first ranking final since winning the 2021 World Championship. He went on to win the event, defeating Luca Brecel 9–6 in the final to capture his 21st ranking title. He became the first player to win the English Open twice, and the second player, after Judd Trump, to win four Home Nations tournaments.

Mark Williams made the tournament's highest break, the third maximum break of his career, in the fourth frame of his quarter-final match against Robertson. Aged 47 years and 270 days, he became the oldest player to make an officially recognised maximum break in professional competition.

== Prize fund ==
The breakdown of prize money for this event is shown below:

- Winner: £80,000
- Runner-up: £35,000
- Semi-final: £17,500
- Quarter-final: £11,000
- Last 16: £7,500
- Last 32: £4,500
- Last 64: £3,000
- Highest break: £5,000
- Total: £427,000

== Main draw ==
=== Top half ===
Last 64; Best of 7 frames
Neil Robertson (AUS) (1)	4
Lei Peifan (CHN)	3
Elliot Slessor (ENG)	w/o
Chang Bingyu (CHN)	w/d
Ryan Day (WAL) (16)	4
Hammad Miah (ENG)	3
Ricky Walden (ENG) (17)	4
Liam Highfield (ENG)	0
Peter Lines (ENG)	1
Marco Fu (HKG)	4
Muhammad Asif (PAK)	2
Barry Hawkins (ENG) (9)	4
Louis Heathcote (ENG)	3
Matthew Selt (ENG) (25)	4
Dominic Dale (WAL)	2
Mark Williams (WAL) (8)	4
John Higgins (SCO) (5)	4
Mark King (ENG)	1
Robert Milkins (ENG) (28)	4
Julien Leclercq (BEL)	1
Jack Lisowski (ENG) (12)	4
Stuart Carrington (ENG)	0
Ali Carter (ENG) (21)	4
Chen Zifan (CHN)	0
Michael White (WAL)	1
Anthony McGill (SCO) (20)	4
Sam Craigie (ENG)	1
Shaun Murphy (ENG) (13)	4
Wu Yize (CHN)	4
Cao Yupeng (CHN)	3
Joe O'Connor (ENG)	2
Mark Selby (ENG) (4)	4

Last 32; Best of 7 frames
(Australia) Neil Robertson (1)	4
(England) Elliot Slessor	0
(Wales) Ryan Day (16)	4
(England) Ricky Walden (17)	3
(Hong Kong) Marco Fu	2
(England) Barry Hawkins (9)	4
(England) Matthew Selt (25)	0
(Wales) Mark Williams (8)	4
(Scotland) John Higgins (5)	4
(England) Robert Milkins (28)	3
(England) Jack Lisowski (12)	2
(England) Ali Carter (21)	4
(Scotland) Anthony McGill (20)	2
(England) Shaun Murphy (13)	4
(China) Wu Yize	1
(England) Mark Selby (4)	4

Last 16; Best of 7 frames
(Australia) Neil Robertson (1)	4
(Wales) Ryan Day (16)	2
(England) Barry Hawkins (9)	2
(Wales) Mark Williams (8)	4
(Scotland) John Higgins (5)	2
(England) Ali Carter (21)	4
(England) Shaun Murphy (13)	3
(England) Mark Selby (4)	4

Quarter-finals; Best of 9 frames
(Australia) Neil Robertson (1)	5
(Wales) Mark Williams (8)	3
(England) Ali Carter (21)	3
(England) Mark Selby (4)	5

Semi-finals; Best of 11 frames
(Australia) Neil Robertson (1)	4
(England) Mark Selby (4)	6

=== Bottom half ===
Last 64; Best of 7 frames
Judd Trump (ENG) (3)	4
Craig Steadman (ENG)	1
Lu Ning (CHN)	w/d
Fraser Patrick (SCO)	w/o
Thepchaiya Un-Nooh (THA)	4
Tian Pengfei (CHN)	1
David Gilbert (ENG) (19)	1
Yuan Sijun (CHN)	4
Mark Davis (ENG)	2
Scott Donaldson (SCO)	4
Oliver Lines (ENG)	2
Luca Brecel (BEL) (11)	4
Ken Doherty (IRL)	2
Jamie Jones (WAL) (27)	4
Ben Woollaston (ENG)	0
Kyren Wilson (ENG) (6)	4
Zhao Xintong (CHN) (7)	4
Andres Petrov (EST)	0
Zhang Anda (CHN)	1
John Astley (ENG)	4
Mark Allen (NIR) (10)	4
Dylan Emery (WAL)	1
Xu Si (CHN)	1
Ding Junhui (CHN)	4
Pang Junxu (CHN)	4
Hossein Vafaei (IRN) (18)	2
Fan Zhengyi (CHN)	3
Ashley Hugill (ENG)	4
Martin Gould (ENG)	4
Gary Wilson (ENG) (31)	2
Dechawat Poomjaeng (THA)	2
Ronnie O'Sullivan (ENG) (2)	4

Last 32; Best of 7 frames
(England) Judd Trump (3)	4
(Scotland) Fraser Patrick	0
(Thailand) Thepchaiya Un-Nooh	4
(China) Yuan Sijun	1
(Scotland) Scott Donaldson	1
(Belgium) Luca Brecel (11)	4
(Wales) Jamie Jones (27)	4
(England) Kyren Wilson (6)	1
(China) Zhao Xintong (7)	0
(England) John Astley	4
(Northern Ireland) Mark Allen (10)	4
(China) Ding Junhui	3
(China) Pang Junxu	2
(England) Ashley Hugill	4
(England) Martin Gould	4
(England) Ronnie O'Sullivan (2)	1

Last 16; Best of 7 frames
(England) Judd Trump (3)	4
(Thailand) Thepchaiya Un-Nooh	2
(Belgium) Luca Brecel (11)	4
(Wales) Jamie Jones (27)	2
(England) John Astley	1
(Northern Ireland) Mark Allen (10)	4
(England) Ashley Hugill	4
(England) Martin Gould	1

Quarter-finals; Best of 9 frames
(England) Judd Trump (3)	1
(Belgium) Luca Brecel (11)	5
(Northern Ireland) Mark Allen (10)	5
(England) Ashley Hugill	0

Semi-finals; Best of 11 frames
(Belgium) Luca Brecel (11)	6
(Northern Ireland) Mark Allen (10)	2

=== Final ===
Final: Best of 17 frames. Referee: Tatiana Woollaston; Brentwood Centre, Brentwood, England, 18 December 2022
Mark Selby (4); England	9–6	Luca Brecel (11); Belgium
Afternoon: 90–0, 64–4, 74–14, 27–96, 77–43, 45–96, 7–78, 2–72; Evening: 83–33, 73–5, 0–123 (122), 67–36, 62–20, 0–113 (113), 87–0
90	Highest break	122
0	Century breaks	2

== Qualifying ==
Qualification for the tournament took place from 25 to 30 October 2022 at the Morningside Arena in Leicester, England.

=== Main Qualifying ===
A single pre-qualifying match was played before the main qualifying draw was conducted:

- PQ3: Ian Burns (ENG) 4–2 Sanderson Lam (ENG)
- Lei Peifan (CHN) 4–1 Chris Wakelin (ENG)
- Tom Ford (ENG) 1–4 Elliot Slessor (ENG)
- Chang Bingyu (CHN) 4–0 Fergal O'Brien (IRL)
- Lukas Kleckers (GER) 0–4 Hammad Miah (ENG)
- Ricky Walden (ENG) 4–1 Bai Langning (CHN)
- Aaron Hill (IRL) 3–4 Liam Highfield (ENG)
- Liang Wenbo (CHN) w/d–w/o Peter Lines (ENG)
- Oliver Brown (ENG) 2–4 Muhammad Asif (PAK)
- Jamie O'Neill (ENG) 2–4 Louis Heathcote (ENG)
- Dominic Dale (WAL) 4–2 Zak Surety (ENG)
- David Lilley (ENG) 3–4 Mark King (ENG)
- Robert Milkins (ENG) 4–1 Duane Jones (WAL)
- Si Jiahui (CHN) 0–4 Julien Leclercq (BEL)
- Stuart Carrington (ENG) 4–2 Jak Jones (WAL)
- Ali Carter (ENG) 4–1 Adam Duffy (ENG)
- Chen Zifan (CHN) 4–3 Mink Nutcharut (THA)
- Michael White (WAL) 4–0 Michael Judge (IRL)
- Anthony McGill (SCO) 4–3 David Grace (ENG)
- Graeme Dott (SCO) 3–4 Sam Craigie (ENG)
- Anton Kazakov (UKR) 1–4 Wu Yize (CHN)
- Joe Perry (ENG) 1–4 Cao Yupeng (CHN)
- Jenson Kendrick (ENG) 2–4 Joe O'Connor (ENG)
- Craig Steadman (ENG) 4–0 Himanshu Jain (IND)
- Lu Ning (CHN) 4–2 James Cahill (ENG)
- Fraser Patrick (SCO) 4–0 Jimmy White (ENG)
- Tian Pengfei (CHN) 4–1 Peng Yisong (CHN)
- David Gilbert (ENG) 4–2 Mohamed Ibrahim (EGY)
- Rebecca Kenna (ENG) 0–4 Yuan Sijun (CHN)
- Xiao Guodong (CHN) 2–4 Mark Davis (ENG)
- Jordan Brown (NIR) 2–4 Scott Donaldson (SCO)
- Dean Young (SCO) 0–4 Oliver Lines (ENG)
- Ken Doherty (IRL) 4–1 Robbie Williams (ENG)
- Jamie Jones (WAL) 4–2 Alfie Burden (ENG)
- Jamie Clarke (WAL) 3–4 Ben Woollaston (ENG)
- Andres Petrov (EST) 4–3 Victor Sarkis (BRA)
- Stephen Maguire (SCO) 0–4 Zhang Anda (CHN)
- John Astley (ENG) 4–0 Ng On-yee (HKG)
- Dylan Emery (WAL) 4–0 Li Hang (CHN)
- Zhou Yuelong (CHN) 2–4 Xu Si (CHN)
- Ding Junhui (CHN) 4–0 Ian Burns (ENG)
- Pang Junxu (CHN) 4–0 Barry Pinches (ENG)
- Hossein Vafaei (IRN) 4–2 Zhang Jiankang (CHN)
- Fan Zhengyi (CHN) 4–1 Andy Hicks (ENG)
- Andy Lee (HKG) 2–4 Martin Gould (ENG)
- Gary Wilson (ENG) 4–1 Lyu Haotian (CHN)
- Dechawat Poomjaeng (THA) 4–3 Alexander Ursenbacher (SUI)

=== Held-Over Matches ===
Matches involving the Top 16, the defending champion and the nominated wild-card players were played at the Brentwood Centre. The matches involving winners from the held-over pre-qualifying matches were also held over to the venue.

- PQ1: Marco Fu (HKG) 4–0 Lewis Ullah (ENG)
- PQ2: Callum Beresford (ENG) 4–1 Ryan Thomerson (AUS)
- Neil Robertson (AUS) (1) 4–0 Andrew Pagett (WAL)
- Ryan Day (WAL) 4–2 Asjad Iqbal (PAK)
- Jimmy Robertson (ENG) 1–4 Marco Fu (HKG)
- Barry Hawkins (ENG) (9) 4–1 Rod Lawler (ENG)
- Matthew Selt (ENG) 4–0 Callum Beresford (ENG)
- Mark Williams (WAL) (8) 4–3 Matthew Stevens (WAL)
- John Higgins (SCO) (5) 4–0 Gerard Greene (NIR)
- Jack Lisowski (ENG) 4–2 Sean O'Sullivan (ENG)
- Shaun Murphy (ENG) 4–2 Anthony Hamilton (ENG)
- Mark Selby (ENG) (4) 4–3 Noppon Saengkham (THA)
- Judd Trump (ENG) (3) 4–3 Jackson Page (WAL)
- Stuart Bingham (ENG) 1–4 Thepchaiya Un-Nooh (THA)
- Luca Brecel (BEL) 4–3 Mark Joyce (ENG)
- Kyren Wilson (ENG) (6) 4–0 Reanne Evans (ENG)
- Zhao Xintong (CHN) (7) 4–2 Allan Taylor (ENG)
- Mark Allen (NIR) 4–1 Mitchell Mann (ENG)
- Yan Bingtao (CHN) (15) w/d–w/o Ashley Hugill (ENG)
- Ronnie O'Sullivan (ENG) (2) 4–3 Ben Mertens (BEL)

== Century breaks ==
=== Main stage centuries ===
Total: 73

- 147, 135, 134, 130, 123 – Mark Williams
- 142, 136, 100 – Ali Carter
- 141, 135, 113, 109, 100 – Mark Allen
- 141, 130, 127, 122, 110, 102, 100 – Neil Robertson
- 137, 105 – Mark Joyce
- 136, 134, 121 – Lei Peifan
- 136, 128, 127, 105, 104, 102 – Mark Selby
- 135, 122, 113, 108, 101 – Luca Brecel
- 135 – Zhao Xintong
- 130, 126, 103 – Ryan Day
- 129, 125, 122, 122, 102 – Thepchaiya Un-Nooh
- 128, 118 – Judd Trump
- 128, 118 – Martin Gould
- 128 – Scott Donaldson
- 127, 126, 101 – Barry Hawkins
- 127, 119, 111, 105 – Shaun Murphy
- 124 – Ding Junhui
- 121, 111 – Jack Lisowski
- 121 – Pang Junxu
- 118 – Sam Craigie
- 114 – Louis Heathcote
- 113 – Matthew Selt
- 111 – Marco Fu
- 106 – Cao Yupeng
- 106 – Noppon Saengkham
- 104 – Ronnie O'Sullivan
- 103 – John Higgins
- 102 – Jamie Jones
- 102 – Yuan Sijun
- 101 – Ashley Hugill
- 101 – Tian Pengfei

=== Qualifying stage centuries ===
Total: 26

- 141 – Michael White
- 140 – Wu Yize
- 138, 134, 106 – Ding Junhui
- 134 – Muhammad Asif
- 132 – David Gilbert
- 122 – Alfie Burden
- 122 – Chen Zifan
- 120, 105 – Xu Si
- 118 – Lu Ning
- 112, 100 – Sam Craigie
- 109 – Mohamed Ibrahim
- 109 – Jamie Jones
- 107, 100 – Dylan Emery
- 104 – Chang Bingyu
- 104 – Martin Gould
- 103 – Ricky Walden
- 101 – Fan Zhengyi
- 101 – Zhang Anda
- 101 – Zhou Yuelong
- 100 – Ali Carter
- 100 – Mark Davis
