= 2022 Scottish Open (snooker) =

2022 BetVictor Scottish Open
Tournament information
- Dates: 28 November – 4 December 2022
- Venue: Meadowbank Sports Centre
- City: Edinburgh
- Country: Scotland
- Organisation: World Snooker Tour
- Format: Ranking event
- Total prize fund: £427,000
- Winner's share: £80,000
- Highest break: Judd Trump (ENG) (147)

Final
- Champion: Gary Wilson (ENG)
- Runner-up: Joe O'Connor (ENG)
- Score: 9–2

The 2022 Scottish Open (officially the 2022 BetVictor Scottish Open) was a professional snooker tournament that took place from 28 November to 4 December 2022 at Meadowbank Sports Centre in Edinburgh, Scotland, the first time since the 2003 event that the tournament was staged in that city. It was the sixth ranking event of the 2022–23 season and the second tournament in the Home Nations Series, following the Northern Ireland Open and preceding the English Open and the Welsh Open. It was the third of eight tournaments in the season's European Series. Qualifiers were held from 4 to 9 October at the Chase Leisure Centre in Cannock, England, although matches involving the top 16 players in the world rankings were held over and played at the main venue. Sponsored by BetVictor, the tournament was broadcast by Eurosport in the UK and Europe. The winner received £80,000 from a total prize fund of £427,000.

Luca Brecel was the defending champion, having defeated John Higgins 9–5 in the 2021 final. However, Brecel lost 3–4 to Fraser Patrick in the first round. World number 32 Gary Wilson reached his third ranking final, having previously been runner-up at the 2015 China Open and the 2021 British Open, while world number 55 Joe O'Connor reached a ranking final for the first time. Wilson won the last six frames of the final to clinch a 9–2 victory over O'Connor and capture the first ranking title of his career.

Judd Trump compiled the highest break of the tournament, making the eighth maximum break of his career in his second-round match against Mitchell Mann. In doing so, Trump became only the second player, after Shaun Murphy, to make three maximums in a calendar year, having previously achieved 147s at the 2022 Turkish Masters and the 2022 Champion of Champions.

During his first-round match against Bai Langning, world number one Ronnie O'Sullivan was believed to have set a new record for the fastest televised century break, with the time initially given as three minutes and 24 seconds. However, after reviewing the footage, tour officials added ten seconds to the time of O'Sullivan's break, putting it three seconds outside the record of three minutes and 31 seconds set by Tony Drago at the 1996 UK Championship.

== Prize fund ==
The breakdown of prize money for this event is shown below:

- Winner: £80,000
- Runner-up: £35,000
- Semi-final: £17,500
- Quarter-final: £11,000
- Last 16: £7,500
- Last 32: £4,500
- Last 64: £3,000
- Highest break: £5,000
- Total: £427,000

== Main draw ==
=== Top half ===
Last 64; Best of 7 frames
Fraser Patrick (SCO)	3
Sam Craigie (ENG)	4
Dylan Emery (WAL)	1
Zhang Anda (CHN)	4
Ryan Day (WAL) (16)	4
Lyu Haotian (CHN)	2
Ricky Walden (ENG) (17)	4
Mark King (ENG)	3
Pang Junxu (CHN)	2
Jimmy Robertson (ENG) (24)	4
Liang Wenbo (CHN)	w/d
Mark Williams (WAL) (9)	w/o
Ding Junhui (CHN)	4
Mark Joyce (ENG)	2
Joe O'Connor (ENG)	4
Zhao Xintong (CHN) (8)	3
Mark Selby (ENG) (5)	4
John Astley (ENG)	0
Robert Milkins (ENG) (28)	4
Stuart Carrington (ENG)	2
Jack Lisowski (ENG) (12)	4
Allan Taylor (ENG)	0
Ali Carter (ENG) (21)	4
Robbie Williams (ENG)	2
Sean O'Sullivan (ENG)	0
Anthony McGill (SCO) (20)	4
Scott Donaldson (SCO)	4
Shaun Murphy (ENG) (13)	0
Graeme Dott (SCO)	3
Joe Perry (ENG) (29)	4
Himanshu Jain (IND)	1
Neil Robertson (AUS) (4)	4

Last 32; Best of 7 frames
(England) Sam Craigie	4
(China) Zhang Anda	2
(Wales) Ryan Day (16)	0
(England) Ricky Walden (17)	4
(England) Jimmy Robertson (24)	0
(Wales) Mark Williams (9)	4
(China) Ding Junhui	2
(England) Joe O'Connor	4
(England) Mark Selby (5)	4
(England) Robert Milkins (28)	1
(England) Jack Lisowski (12)	4
(England) Ali Carter (21)	3
(Scotland) Anthony McGill (20)	4
(Scotland) Scott Donaldson	3
(England) Joe Perry (29)	1
(Australia) Neil Robertson (4)	4

Last 16; Best of 7 frames
(England) Sam Craigie	1
(England) Ricky Walden (17)	4
(Wales) Mark Williams (9)	3
(England) Joe O'Connor	4
(England) Mark Selby (5)	4
(England) Jack Lisowski (12)	2
(Scotland) Anthony McGill (20)	2
(Australia) Neil Robertson (4)	4

Quarter-finals; Best of 9 frames
(England) Ricky Walden (17)	1
(England) Joe O'Connor	5
(England) Mark Selby (5)	2
(Australia) Neil Robertson (4)	5

Semi-finals; Best of 11 frames
(England) Joe O'Connor	6
(Australia) Neil Robertson (4)	3

=== Bottom half ===
Last 64; Best of 7 frames
Judd Trump (ENG) (3)	4
Mitchell Mann (ENG)	0
Jamie Clarke (WAL)	4
Hammad Miah (ENG)	2
Zak Surety (ENG)	2
Tian Pengfei (CHN)	4
Xu Si (CHN)	3
Xiao Guodong (CHN)	4
Chang Bingyu (CHN)	w/d
Thepchaiya Un-Nooh (THA)	w/o
Martin Gould (ENG)	2
Mark Allen (NIR) (11)	4
Chen Zifan (CHN)	0
Jamie Jones (WAL) (27)	4
Cao Yupeng (CHN)	3
John Higgins (SCO) (6)	4
Kyren Wilson (ENG) (7)	4
Matthew Stevens (WAL)	3
Stephen Maguire (SCO) (26)	4
Ashley Hugill (ENG)	1
Barry Hawkins (ENG) (10)	4
Michael White (WAL)	1
Zhou Yuelong (CHN) (23)	4
David Lilley (ENG)	1
Noppon Saengkham (THA)	0
Hossein Vafaei (IRN) (18)	4
Liam Highfield (ENG)	3
Yan Bingtao (CHN) (15)	4
Ken Doherty (IRL)	2
Gary Wilson (ENG) (31)	4
Ben Woollaston (ENG)	2
Ronnie O'Sullivan (ENG) (2)	4

Last 32; Best of 7 frames
(England) Judd Trump (3)	4
(Wales) Jamie Clarke	1
(China) Tian Pengfei	2
(China) Xiao Guodong	4
(Thailand) Thepchaiya Un-Nooh	4
(Northern Ireland) Mark Allen (11)	1
(Wales) Jamie Jones (27)	4
(Scotland) John Higgins (6)	3
(England) Kyren Wilson (7)	4
(Scotland) Stephen Maguire (26)	2
(England) Barry Hawkins (10)	0
(China) Zhou Yuelong (23)	4
(Iran) Hossein Vafaei (18)	4
(China) Yan Bingtao (15)	3
(England) Gary Wilson (31)	4
(England) Ronnie O'Sullivan (2)	3

Last 16; Best of 7 frames
(England) Judd Trump (3)	4
(China) Xiao Guodong	2
(Thailand) Thepchaiya Un-Nooh	4
(Wales) Jamie Jones (27)	3
(England) Kyren Wilson (7)	4
(China) Zhou Yuelong (23)	2
(Iran) Hossein Vafaei (18)	3
(England) Gary Wilson (31)	4

Quarter-finals; Best of 9 frames
(England) Judd Trump (3)	4
(Thailand) Thepchaiya Un-Nooh	5
(England) Kyren Wilson (7)	3
(England) Gary Wilson (31)	5

Semi-finals; Best of 11 frames
(Thailand) Thepchaiya Un-Nooh	4
(England) Gary Wilson (31)	6

=== Final ===
Final: Best of 17 frames. Referee: Ben Williams; Meadowbank Sports Centre, Edinburgh, Scotland, 4 December 2022
Joe O'Connor; England	2–9	Gary Wilson (31); England
Afternoon: 8–129 (102), 99–0, 64–67, 0–88, 82–7, 12–102 (102), 34–80, 44–74; Evening: 32–81, 46–54, 0–94
99	Highest break	102
0	Century breaks	2

== Qualifying ==
Qualification for the tournament took place from 9 to 14 October 2022 at the Chase Leisure Centre in Cannock.

- Sam Craigie (ENG) 4–3 Dean Young (SCO)
- Tom Ford (ENG) 3–4 Dylan Emery (WAL)
- Zhang Anda (CHN) 4–2 Duane Jones (WAL)
- Lyu Haotian (CHN) 4–2 Alfie Burden (ENG)
- Ricky Walden (ENG) 4–2 Peng Yisong (CHN)
- Si Jiahui (CHN) 1–4 Mark King (ENG)
- Julien Leclercq (BEL) 1–4 Pang Junxu (CHN)
- Jimmy Robertson (ENG) 4–1 Oliver Brown (ENG)
- Oliver Lines (ENG) 2–4 Liang Wenbo (CHN)
- Ding Junhui (CHN) 4–1 Elliot Slessor (ENG)
- Matthew Selt (ENG) 3–4 Mark Joyce (ENG)
- Zhang Jiankang (CHN) 1–4 Joe O'Connor (ENG)
- Robert Milkins (ENG) 4–3 Barry Pinches (ENG)
- Stuart Carrington (ENG) 4–0 Asjad Iqbal (PAK)
- Allan Taylor (ENG) 4–1 Jenson Kendrick (ENG)
- Ali Carter (ENG) 4–2 David Grace (ENG)
- Lukas Kleckers (GER) 3–4 Sean O'Sullivan (ENG)
- Anthony McGill (SCO) 4–1 Wu Yize (CHN)
- Scott Donaldson (SCO) 4–2 Louis Heathcote (ENG)
- Muhammad Asif (PAK) 0–4 Graeme Dott (SCO)
- Joe Perry (ENG) 4–2 Zhao Jianbo (CHN)
- Himanshu Jain (IND) 4–3 Jimmy White (ENG)
- Mitchell Mann (ENG) 4–1 Reanne Evans (ENG)
- Lu Ning (CHN) 3–4 Jamie Clarke (WAL)
- Rebecca Kenna (ENG) 1–4 Hammad Miah (ENG)
- Fergal O'Brien (IRL) 0–4 Tian Pengfei (CHN)
- David Gilbert (ENG) 3–4 Xu Si (CHN)
- Xiao Guodong (CHN) 4–1 Victor Sarkis (BRA)
- Chang Bingyu (CHN) 4–1 Alexander Ursenbacher (SUI)
- Jordan Brown (NIR) 3–4 Thepchaiya Un-Nooh (THA)
- Adam Duffy (ENG) 2–4 Martin Gould (ENG)
- Chen Zifan (CHN) 4–0 Ryan Thomerson (AUS)
- Jamie Jones (WAL) 4–2 Jak Jones (WAL)
- Cao Yupeng (CHN) 4–2 Yuan Sijun (CHN)
- Anton Kazakov (UKR) 1–4 Matthew Stevens (WAL)
- Stephen Maguire (SCO) 4–0 Michael Judge (IRL)
- Ashley Hugill (ENG) 4–1 Ben Mertens (BEL)
- Michael White (WAL) 4–2 Andy Hicks (ENG)
- Zhou Yuelong (CHN) 4–2 Rod Lawler (ENG)
- Craig Steadman (ENG) 1–4 David Lilley (ENG)
- Noppon Saengkham (THA) 4–1 Mink Nutcharut (THA)
- Hossein Vafaei (IRN) 4–3 Ian Burns (ENG)
- James Cahill (ENG) 3–4 Liam Highfield (ENG)
- Ken Doherty (IRL) 4–2 Dominic Dale (WAL)
- Gary Wilson (ENG) 4–1 Jamie O'Neill (ENG)
- Ben Woollaston (ENG) 4–2 Chris Wakelin (ENG)

=== Held-over matches ===
Matches involving top 16 and wild card players were played at Meadowbank Sports Centre.

- Luca Brecel (BEL) (1) 3–4 Fraser Patrick (SCO)
- Ryan Day (WAL) 4–2 Fan Zhengyi (CHN)
- Mark Williams (WAL) (9) 4–1 Andres Petrov (EST)
- Zhao Xintong (CHN) (8) 4–2 Jackson Page (WAL)
- Mark Selby (ENG) (5) 4–2 Aaron Hill (IRL)
- John Astley (ENG) 4–1 Amaan Iqbal (SCO)
- Jack Lisowski (ENG) 4–1 Gerard Greene (NIR)
- Liam Graham (SCO) 1–4 Robbie Williams (ENG)
- Shaun Murphy (ENG) 4–0 Lei Peifan (CHN)
- Neil Robertson (AUS) (4) 4–1 Mark Davis (ENG)
- Judd Trump (ENG) (3) 4–0 Sanderson Lam (ENG)
- Stuart Bingham (ENG) 3–4 Zak Surety (ENG)
- Mark Allen (NIR) 4–1 Andy Lee (HKG)
- John Higgins (SCO) (6) 4–2 Anthony Hamilton (ENG)
- Kyren Wilson (ENG) (7) 4–0 Ng On-yee (HKG)
- Barry Hawkins (ENG) 4–0 Andrew Pagett (WAL)
- Yan Bingtao (CHN) 4–1 Li Hang (CHN)
- Ronnie O'Sullivan (ENG) (2) 4–0 Bai Langning (CHN)

== Century breaks ==
=== Main stage centuries ===
Total: 86

- 147, 107, 104, 102 – Judd Trump
- 142, 123, 114 – Mark Williams
- 139, 137, 105, 101 – Jack Lisowski
- 137, 133, 127, 117, 116, 104, 104, 101, 100 – Neil Robertson
- 137, 127, 104 – Joe O'Connor
- 136, 111 – Yan Bingtao
- 135, 129, 122 – Zhao Xintong
- 134, 130, 123, 122, 115, 102, 102 – Gary Wilson
- 134 – Tian Pengfei
- 133 – Zak Surety
- 132, 110 – Zhou Yuelong
- 132, 108 – Ding Junhui
- 132, 107 – Mark Allen
- 132 – Ben Woollaston
- 131, 129, 128, 120 – Jamie Jones
- 131, 121, 117, 114, 102, 100, 100, 100 – Kyren Wilson
- 131 – Robbie Williams
- 124 – Aaron Hill
- 123 – Anthony Hamilton
- 122, 109, 101 – Hossein Vafaei
- 118 – Ronnie O'Sullivan
- 116 – Ricky Walden
- 112, 109, 106, 104 – Thepchaiya Un-Nooh
- 112, 105, 104 – Mark Selby
- 108, 103 – John Higgins
- 108 – Mark Joyce
- 107, 107, 101 – Ali Carter
- 107, 104, 100 – Shaun Murphy
- 107 – Pang Junxu
- 105, 102, 100 – Stephen Maguire
- 100 – Barry Hawkins
- 100 – Anthony McGill

=== Qualifying stage centuries ===
Total: 25

- 137 – Gary Wilson
- 126 – Barry Pinches
- 125, 120 – Ding Junhui
- 124 – Lyu Haotian
- 124 – Si Jiahui
- 121 – David Lilley
- 119 – Liang Wenbo
- 117, 113, 104 – Liam Highfield
- 117 – David Grace
- 117 – Xu Si
- 115 – Mitchell Mann
- 113 – Dylan Emery
- 112 – Sam Craigie
- 111 – Dominic Dale
- 108 – James Cahill
- 104 – Chang Bingyu
- 104 – Thepchaiya Un-Nooh
- 103 – Ali Carter
- 102, 100 – Stuart Carrington
- 101 – Scott Donaldson
- 101 – Wu Yize
