= Sam Craigie =

English snooker player

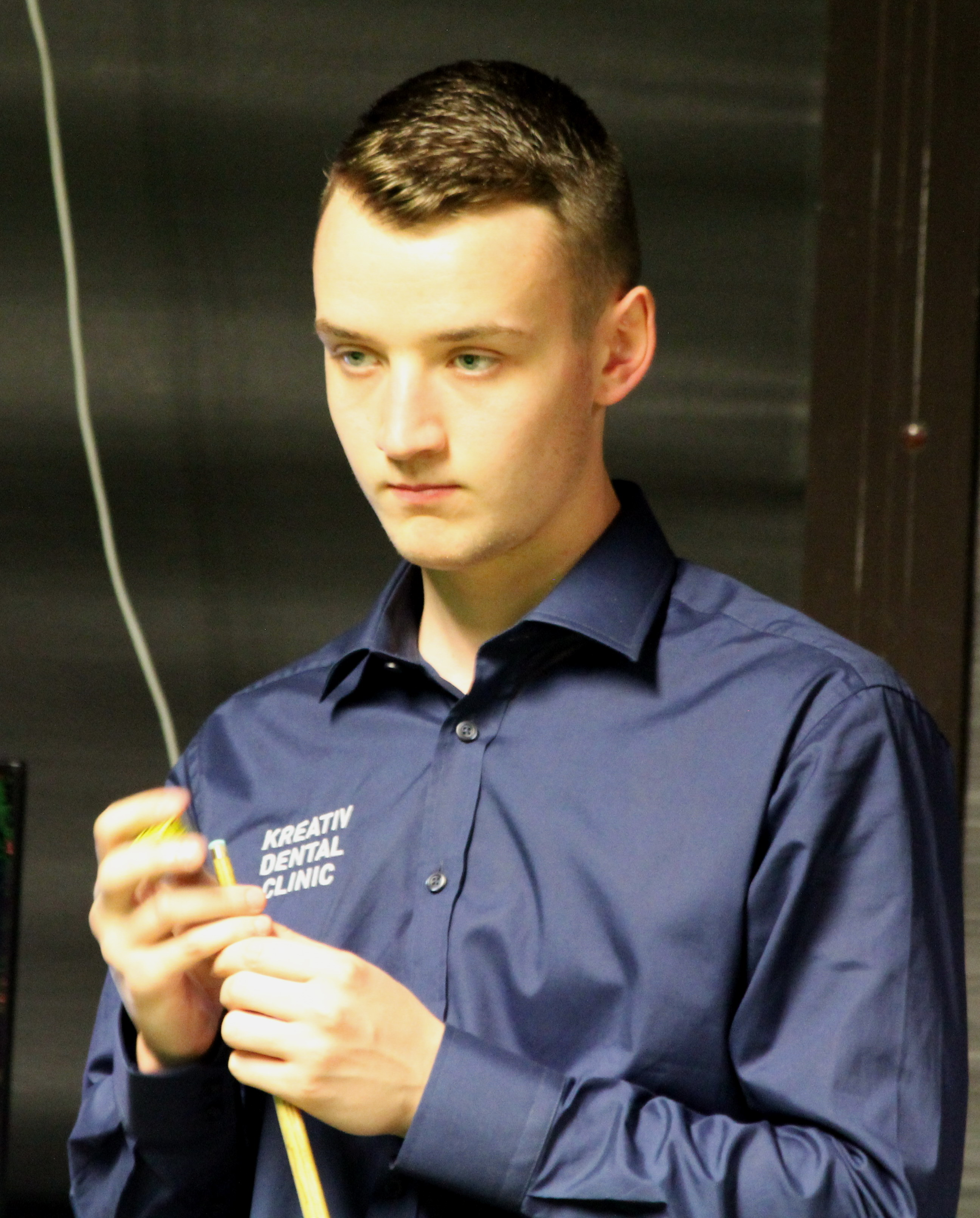
- Craigie at the 2015 Paul Hunter Classic

Personal information
- Born: 29 December 1993 (age 32) Newcastle upon Tyne, England

Sport
- Country: England
- Sport: Snooker
- Professional: 2011/2012, 2016–present
- Highest ranking: 33 (February 2023)
- Current ranking: 66 (as of 26 October 2026)
- Century breaks: 130 (as of 1 November 2026)
- Best ranking finish: 3rd (2021 WST Pro Series)

Sam Craigie (born 29 December 1993) is an English professional snooker player from Newcastle. He enjoyed a successful junior career before turning professional in 2011.

== Career ==
=== Early career ===
Craigie qualified for the 2011/2012 Main Tour after winning the 2010 IBSF World Under 21 Championships. He defeated his brother Stephen 7–6 in the semi-finals before beating Li Hang 9–8 in the final to secure the title.

=== 2011/2012 season ===
In his debut season on the snooker tour he was unranked and therefore needed to win four qualifying matches to make the main draws of the ranking events. He won two matches in attempts to reach both the Australian Goldfields Open and German Masters respectively and had his best set of results in qualifying for the China Open, where he beat Adam Wicheard, Liu Song and Gerard Greene, before losing to Ricky Walden 3–5 in the final round. Craigie played in 11 of the 12 minor-ranking Players Tour Championship events throughout the season, with his best finish coming in Event 11 where he was defeated by Walden again, this time in the last 16 by 4 frames to 2. Craigie finished his first season ranked outside of the top 64 who automatically retained their places for the 2012/2013 season and therefore dropped off the main tour.

=== Following years ===
Craigie played in two events in the 2012/2013 season, but could only pick up one frame. He did not enter an event in the following season, but did play in 2015 Q School, coming closest to rejoining the tour in the first event when he was defeated 4–2 by Adam Duffy in the last 32.

=== 2016/2017 season ===
In 2016, Craigie received a two-year tour card for the 2016/2017 and 2017/2018 seasons after successfully qualifying through the EBSA Play-Offs in Sheffield, beating Adam Duffy 4–3 in the last round of the event. He qualified for the World Open with a 5–3 victory over 1997 world champion Ken Doherty and won his first match in a main draw of a ranking event by beating Marco Fu 5–3 in the opening round. Craigie was then edged out 5–4 by Matthew Selt. Craigie made a century and two fifty plus breaks to whitewash Jamie Jones 4–0 at the Northern Ireland Open, before John Higgins made a 147, 137 and 130 in a second round 4–1 defeat. Craigie was 3–1 ahead of Mark King at the interval of their first round match at the UK Championship and that quickly became 4–1 when King was docked a frame for forgetting his cue at the resumption of play. Craigie went on to win 6–2, but in the second round lost 6–5 to Luca Brecel after leading 5–3. Shaun Murphy knocked Craigie out of the Shoot-Out and in the second round of the Gibraltar Open.

He dropped off the tour at the end of the 2017/18 season but entered 2018 Q School in an attempt to win back a place. He defeated former crucible semi-finalist Andy Hicks in round 3 of the first event and beat Dechawat Poomjaeng in the final round to secure his return to the tour at the first event.

=== 2018/2019 season ===
In April 2019, he reached the quarter final of a ranking event for the first time at the China Open after beating the likes of Ryan Day, Ali Carter and Liang Wenbo before being whitewashed by Neil Robertson.

=== 2019/2020 season ===
Craigie's best result for the season was reaching the Last 32 of the Riga Masters after beating Long Zehuang and Jamie O'Neil before losing 4–3 to Matthew Selt.

=== 2020/2021 season ===
Craigie qualified for the World Snooker Championship for the first time after beating Ashley Hugill, Hossein Vafaei, and Zhao Xintong in the qualifying rounds. He drew Mark Williams in the first round.

== Personal life ==
Craigie's elder brother Stephen is a former professional snooker player.

== Performance and rankings timeline ==
Tournament	2010/ 11	2011/ 12	2012/ 13	2015/ 16	2016/ 17	2017/ 18	2018/ 19	2019/ 20	2020/ 21	2021/ 22	2022/ 23	2023/ 24	2024/ 25	2025/ 26	2026/ 27
Ranking (Note: It shows the ranking at the beginning of the season)	(Note: He was an amateur)	(Note: New players on the Main Tour don't have a ranking)				76	(Note: Players qualified through Q School started the season without ranking points)	66	58	50	44	51	46	(Note: Players issued an invitational tour card began the season without ranking points)	70
Ranking tournaments
Championship League	Non-Ranking Event								RR	RR	RR	3R	A	2R	WD
China Open	A	LQ	A	A	LQ	2R	QF	Tournament Not Held							LQ
Wuhan Open	Tournament Not Held											2R	WD	LQ	LQ
British Open	Tournament Not Held									1R	LQ	LQ	WD	1R	LQ
English Open	Tournament Not Held				WD	1R	2R	2R	WD	LQ	1R	LQ	WD	LQ	2R
Shenzhen Open (Note: The event was called the Xi'an Grand Prix (2024/2025–2025/2026))	Tournament Not Held												WD	LQ	LQ
Northern Ireland Open	Tournament Not Held				2R	4R	2R	1R	2R	1R	1R	2R	A	LQ	SF
International Championship	Not Held		A	LQ	LQ	1R	LQ	1R	Not Held			1R	A	WD	2R
UK Championship	A	LQ	A	A	2R	1R	1R	1R	1R	3R	QF	LQ	A	LQ	
Shoot Out	Non-Ranking Event				3R	A	1R	1R	2R	WD	2R	WD	A	WD	
Scottish Open	Not Held		MR	NH	1R	2R	1R	1R	3R	2R	3R	2R	A	1R	
German Masters	A	LQ	A	LQ	LQ	LQ	LQ	LQ	LQ	2R	1R	SF	A	LQ	
Welsh Open	A	LQ	A	1R	1R	3R	3R	1R	2R	WD	1R	LQ	A	3R	
World Grand Prix	Not Held			DNQ	DNQ	DNQ	DNQ	DNQ	DNQ	DNQ	2R	DNQ	DNQ	DNQ	
Players Championship (Note: The event was called the Players Tour Championship Grand Final (2010/2011–2012/2013 and 2015/2016))	DNQ	DNQ	DNQ	DNQ	DNQ	DNQ	DNQ	DNQ	DNQ	DNQ	DNQ	DNQ	DNQ	DNQ	
World Open	A	LQ	A	NH	2R	1R	WD	1R	Not Held			WD	A	2R	
Tour Championship	Tournament Not Held						DNQ	DNQ	DNQ	DNQ	DNQ	DNQ	DNQ	DNQ	
World Championship	A	LQ	A	A	LQ	LQ	LQ	LQ	1R	LQ	LQ	LQ	A	LQ	
Non-ranking tournaments
Championship League	A	A	A	A	A	A	A	2R	A	A	A	RR	A	A	
Former ranking tournaments
Australian Goldfields Open	NH	LQ	A	LQ	Tournament Not Held										
Shanghai Masters	A	LQ	A	A	LQ	LQ	Non-Ranking		Not Held			Non-Ranking Event			
Paul Hunter Classic	Minor-Ranking Event				A	2R	1R	NR	Tournament Not Held						
Indian Open	Tournament Not Held				LQ	LQ	3R	Tournament Not Held							
Riga Masters (Note: The event was called the Riga Open (2015/2016))	Not Held			MR	1R	2R	WD	2R	Tournament Not Held						
China Championship	Tournament Not Held				NR	LQ	1R	1R	Tournament Not Held						
WST Pro Series	Tournament Not Held								3R	Tournament Not Held					
Turkish Masters	Tournament Not Held									3R	Tournament Not Held				
Gibraltar Open	Not Held			MR	2R	3R	WD	2R	1R	WD	Tournament Not Held				
WST Classic	Tournament Not Held										1R	Tournament Not Held			
European Masters	Tournament Not Held				LQ	LQ	1R	LQ	1R	WD	LQ	LQ	Not Held		
Saudi Arabia Masters	Tournament Not Held												WD	4R	NH

Performance Table Legend
LQ	lost in the qualifying draw	#R	lost in the early rounds of the tournament (WR = Wildcard round, RR = Round robin)	QF	lost in the quarter-finals
SF	lost in the semi–finals	F	lost in the final	W	won the tournament
DNQ	did not qualify for the tournament	A	did not participate in the tournament	WD	withdrew from the tournament

NH / Not Held	means an event was not held.
NR / Non-Ranking Event	means an event is/was no longer a ranking event.
R / Ranking Event	means an event is/was a ranking event.
MR / Minor-Ranking Event	means an event is/was a minor-ranking event.
PA / Pro-am Event	means an event is/was a pro-am event.

== Career finals ==
=== Amateur finals: 1 (1 title) ===
Outcome	No.	Year	Championship	Opponent in the final	Score
Winner	1.	2010	IBSF World Under-21 Snooker Championship	(China) Li Hang	9–8
