= 2019 China Open (snooker) =

Snooker tournament

2019 XingPai China Open
Tournament information
- Dates: 1–7 April 2019
- Venue: Olympic Sports Center Gymnasium
- City: Beijing
- Country: China
- Organisation: World Snooker
- Format: Ranking event
- Total prize fund: £1,000,000
- Winner's share: £225,000
- Highest break: Stuart Bingham (ENG) (147)

Final
- Champion: Neil Robertson (AUS)
- Runner-up: Jack Lisowski (ENG)
- Score: 11–4

The 2019 China Open (officially the 2019 XingPai China Open) was a professional ranking snooker tournament, that took place between 1–7 April 2019 in Beijing, China. It was the nineteenth and penultimate ranking event of the 2018/2019 season.

Neil Robertson won his second China Open title, and the 16th ranking title of his career, defeating Jack Lisowski 11–4 in the final.

Mark Selby was the two-time reigning champion, having defended his 2017 title with an 11–3 win against Barry Hawkins in the 2018 final. However, he lost 3–6 to Craig Steadman in qualifying.

Stuart Bingham made the highest break of the event, with his fifth 147 break of his career in his second round match with Peter Ebdon. It was the 151st 147 in snooker history.

== Prize fund ==
The breakdown of prize money is shown below.

- Winner: £225,000
- Runner-up: £90,000
- Semi-final: £45,000
- Quarter-final: £27,000
- Last 16: £18,000
- Last 32: £11,000
- Last 64: £5,000
- Televised highest break: £7,000
- Total: £1,000,000

The "rolling 147 prize" for a maximum break: £20,000

== Main draw ==
Last 64; Best of 11 frames
(England) Craig Steadman | 6
(Wales) Dominic Dale | 5
(China) Liang Wenbo | 6
(England) Gary Wilson | 3
(Wales) Ryan Day | 1
(England) Sam Craigie | 6
(England) Ali Carter | 6
(Norway) Kurt Maflin | 5
(China) Mei Xiwen | 6
(Hong Kong) Marco Fu | 3
(Wales) Kishan Hirani | 2
(Australia) Neil Robertson | 6
(Switzerland) Alexander Ursenbacher | 1
(England) Mark King | 6
(China) Lu Ning | 6
(England) Barry Hawkins | 5
(China) Pang Junxu | 2
(Scotland) Alan McManus | 6
(Wales) Jamie Clarke | 4
(England) Stuart Carrington | 6
(Scotland) Stephen Maguire | 6
(China) Xu Si | 1
(Scotland) Anthony McGill | 6
(England) Nigel Bond | 4
(England) Michael Holt | 6
(China) Xiao Guodong | 4
(England) Sam Baird | 1
(Belgium) Luca Brecel | 6
(Iran) Hossein Vafaei | 6
(England) Robert Milkins | 2
(England) Joe O'Connor | 6
(Scotland) John Higgins | 2
(England) Judd Trump | 5
(England) Robbie Williams | 6
(China) Zhou Yuelong | 3
(China) Li Hang | 6
(England) Jack Lisowski | 6
(England) John Astley | 2
(Northern Ireland) Gerard Greene | 6
(England) Chris Wakelin | 2
(England) Peter Ebdon | 6
(China) Yan Bingtao | 2
(England) Elliot Slessor | 0
(England) Stuart Bingham | 6
(Malaysia) Thor Chuan Leong | 2
(England) Rod Lawler | 6
(China) Yuan Sijun | 1
(England) Kyren Wilson | 6
(China) Ding Junhui | 3
(Thailand) James Wattana | 6
(England) Oliver Lines | 4
(China) Lyu Haotian | 6
(Poland) Adam Stefanow | 1
(England) Andrew Higginson | 6
(England) Ashley Carty | 4
(England) Ben Woollaston | 6
(Scotland) Scott Donaldson | 6
(England) Joe Perry | 4
(England) Matthew Selt | 4
(England) David Gilbert | 6
(England) Ricky Walden | 6
(China) Chang Bingyu | 4
(Republic of Ireland) Ken Doherty | 6
(Wales) Mark Williams | 4

Last 32; Best of 11 frames
(England) Craig Steadman | 5
(China) Liang Wenbo | 6
(England) Sam Craigie | 6
(England) Ali Carter | 4
(China) Mei Xiwen | 3
(Australia) Neil Robertson | 6
(England) Mark King | 2
(China) Lu Ning | 6
(Scotland) Alan McManus | 6
(England) Stuart Carrington | 0
(Scotland) Stephen Maguire | 3
(Scotland) Anthony McGill | 6
(England) Michael Holt | 4
(Belgium) Luca Brecel | 6
(Iran) Hossein Vafaei | 6
(England) Joe O'Connor | 3
(England) Robbie Williams | 4
(China) Li Hang | 6
(England) Jack Lisowski | 6
(Northern Ireland) Gerard Greene | 3
(England) Peter Ebdon | 3
(England) Stuart Bingham | 6
(England) Rod Lawler | 6
(England) Kyren Wilson | 4
(Thailand) James Wattana | 2
(China) Lyu Haotian | 6
(England) Andrew Higginson | 3
(England) Ben Woollaston | 6
(Scotland) Scott Donaldson | 6
(England) David Gilbert | 3
(England) Ricky Walden | 6
(Republic of Ireland) Ken Doherty | 1

Last 16; Best of 11 frames
(China) Liang Wenbo | 2
(England) Sam Craigie | 6
(Australia) Neil Robertson | 6
(China) Lu Ning | 0
(Scotland) Alan McManus | 6
(Scotland) Anthony McGill | 3
(Belgium) Luca Brecel | 6
(Iran) Hossein Vafaei | 0
(China) Li Hang | 4
(England) Jack Lisowski | 6
(England) Stuart Bingham | 6
(England) Rod Lawler | 1
(China) Lyu Haotian | 4
(England) Ben Woollaston | 6
(Scotland) Scott Donaldson | 6
(England) Ricky Walden | 5

Quarter-finals; Best of 11 frames
(England) Sam Craigie | 0
(Australia) Neil Robertson | 6
(Scotland) Alan McManus | 1
(Belgium) Luca Brecel | 6
(England) Jack Lisowski | 6
(England) Stuart Bingham | 5
(England) Ben Woollaston | 4
(Scotland) Scott Donaldson | 6

Semi-finals; Best of 19 frames
(Australia) Neil Robertson | 10
(Belgium) Luca Brecel | 7
(England) Jack Lisowski | 10
(Scotland) Scott Donaldson | 1

Final; Best of 21 frames
(Australia) Neil Robertson | 11
(England) Jack Lisowski | 4

== Final ==
Final: Best of 21 frames. Referee: Wang Wei. Olympic Sports Center Gymnasium, Beijing, China, 7 April 2019.
| Neil Robertson; Australia | 11–4 | Jack Lisowski; England |
Afternoon: 86–32, 141–0 (141), 66–13, 109–23, 13–62, 78–30, 100–0 (100), 75–16, 66–47, 60–77; Evеning: 133–0, 76–14, 60–74, 6–73, 79–1
| 141 | Highest break | 55 |
| 2 | Century breaks | 0 |

== Qualifying ==
Qualifying – excluding held over matches – took place between 18 and 20 February 2019 at the Chase Leisure Centre in Cannock, England. All qualifying matches were best of 11 frames.

| (England) Mark Selby | 3–6 (Note: Match held over and played in Beijing on 1 April 2019.) | (England) Craig Steadman |
| (Wales) Dominic Dale | w/o–w/d | (Scotland) Rhys Clark |
| (China) Liang Wenbo | 6–5 | (China) Zhao Xintong |
| (England) Gary Wilson | 6–1 | (England) Jimmy White |
| (Wales) Ryan Day | 6–2 | (China) Zhang Anda |
| (Thailand) Sunny Akani | 2–6 | (England) Sam Craigie |
| (England) Ali Carter | 6–3 | (England) Allan Taylor |
| (Norway) Kurt Maflin | 6–4 | (England) Ashley Hugill |
| (England) Martin O'Donnell | 4–6 | (China) Mei Xiwen |
| (Hong Kong) Marco Fu | 6–1 | (China) Niu Zhuang |
| (Wales) Daniel Wells | 4–6 | (Wales) Kishan Hirani |
| (Australia) Neil Robertson | 6–0 | (Pakistan) Hamza Akbar |
| (Wales) Matthew Stevens | 5–6 | (Switzerland) Alexander Ursenbacher |
| (England) Mark King | 6–3 | (China) Bai Langning |
| (England) Rory McLeod | 4–6 | (China) Lu Ning |
| (England) Barry Hawkins | 6–3 | (Finland) Robin Hull |
| (Northern Ireland) Mark Allen | w/d–w/o | (China) Pang Junxu |
| (Scotland) Alan McManus | 6–3 | (China) Luo Honghao |
| (Thailand) Noppon Saengkham | 4–6 | (Wales) Jamie Clarke |
| (England) Stuart Carrington | 6–1 | (Germany) Lukas Kleckers |
| (Scotland) Stephen Maguire | 6–1 | (China) Zhang Yong |
| (Thailand) Thepchaiya Un-Nooh | 5–6 | (China) Xu Si |
| (Scotland) Anthony McGill | 6–3 | (Germany) Simon Lichtenberg |
| (England) Mark Joyce | 4–6 | (England) Nigel Bond |
| (England) Michael Holt | 6–5 | (Northern Ireland) Joe Swail |
| (China) Xiao Guodong | 6–1 | (Iran) Soheil Vahedi |
| (Republic of Ireland) Fergal O'Brien | 5–6 | (England) Sam Baird |
| (Belgium) Luca Brecel | 6–1 | (Hong Kong) Andy Lee |
| (Iran) Hossein Vafaei | 6–4 | (England) Hammad Miah |
| (England) Robert Milkins | 6–1 | (Israel) Eden Sharav |
| (England) Liam Highfield | 3–6 | (England) Joe O'Connor |
| (Scotland) John Higgins | 6–1 | (Scotland) Chris Totten |

| (England) Judd Trump | 6–2 | (Wales) Jak Jones |
| (England) Robbie Williams | 6–2 | (China) Tian Pengfei |
| (China) Zhou Yuelong | 6–1 | (Wales) Lee Walker |
| (China) Li Hang | 6–0 | (Northern Ireland) Jordan Brown |
| (England) Jack Lisowski | 6–2 | (England) Alfie Burden |
| (Cyprus) Michael Georgiou | 5–6 | (England) John Astley |
| (Scotland) Graeme Dott | 5–6 | (Northern Ireland) Gerard Greene |
| (England) Chris Wakelin | 6–4 | (England) Peter Lines |
| (England) Peter Ebdon | 6–0 | (England) Sanderson Lam |
| (China) Yan Bingtao | 6–0 | (China) Fan Zhengyi |
| (England) Mike Dunn | 4–6 | (England) Elliot Slessor |
| (England) Stuart Bingham | 6–2 | (China) Chen Zifan |
| (Wales) Michael White | 1–6 | (Malaysia) Thor Chuan Leong |
| (England) Martin Gould | 0–6 | (England) Rod Lawler |
| (China) Yuan Sijun | 6–4 | (England) Ian Burns |
| (England) Kyren Wilson | 6–1 | (China) Chen Feilong |
| (China) Ding Junhui | 6–1 | (China) Zhang Jiankang |
| (England) Anthony Hamilton | 3–6 | (Thailand) James Wattana |
| (England) Tom Ford | 2–6 | (England) Oliver Lines |
| (China) Lyu Haotian | 6–4 | (Scotland) Ross Muir |
| (England) Shaun Murphy | 4–6 | (Poland) Adam Stefanow |
| (England) Andrew Higginson | 6–4 | (Wales) Duane Jones |
| (England) Jimmy Robertson | 3–6 | (England) Ashley Carty |
| (England) Ben Woollaston | 6–1 | (China) Li Yuan |
| (Scotland) Scott Donaldson | 6–1 | (England) Billy Joe Castle |
| (England) Joe Perry | 6–3 | (China) Wu Yize |
| (England) Matthew Selt | 6–1 | (England) David Lilley |
| (England) David Gilbert | 6–2 | (England) Sean O'Sullivan |
| (England) Ricky Walden | 6–2 | (England) James Cahill |
| (England) Mark Davis | 4–6 | (China) Chang Bingyu |
| (Republic of Ireland) Ken Doherty | 6–3 | (England) Paul Davison |
| (Wales) Mark Williams | 6–4 | (England) Harvey Chandler |

== Century breaks ==
=== Main stage centuries ===
Total: 78 11 of these centuries were made in held over matches, by Ding Junhui, Xiao Guodong (2), Mark King, Harvey Chandler, Wu Yize, Soheil Vahedi, Craig Steadman and Mark Williams (3).

- 147, 140, 116, 108, 104, 103, 101, 100 – Stuart Bingham
- 142, 108, 105 – Craig Steadman
- 141, 141, 138, 135, 119, 115, 100, 100 – Neil Robertson
- 139, 130, 116, 108, 102 – Luca Brecel
- 139 – Ding Junhui
- 136, 114, 108, 105 – Jack Lisowski
- 136, 120, 116, 107 – Sam Craigie
- 136 – Kyren Wilson
- 135, 119 – Ben Woollaston
- 134, 132, 130, 105 – Scott Donaldson
- 134, 132 – Michael Holt
- 134, 112 – Liang Wenbo
- 134 – Zhou Yuelong
- 133, 110 – Xiao Guodong
- 133, 100 – Anthony McGill
- 130, 107 – Mark King
- 130 – Harvey Chandler
- 129, 125 – Hossein Vafaei
- 128, 103 – Stephen Maguire
- 124 – Nigel Bond
- 124 – Marco Fu
- 120 – Wu Yize
- 119 – Robbie Williams
- 117 – Ali Carter
- 115, 103 – Ken Doherty
- 115 – Soheil Vahedi
- 111, 105 – Li Hang
- 109, 105, 102 – Alan McManus
- 108, 100 – David Gilbert
- 107 – Joe O'Connor
- 107 – James Wattana
- 106, 102, 101 – Mark Williams
- 104 – Lu Ning
- 104 – Ricky Walden

=== Qualifying stage centuries ===
Total: 35

- 146, 108 – Hossein Vafaei
- 143 – Anthony Hamilton
- 142, 118 – Neil Robertson
- 140 – Ashley Hugill
- 140 – Thepchaiya Un-Nooh
- 135 – Barry Hawkins
- 131 – Matthew Stevens
- 130 – Fergal O'Brien
- 129 – Joe O'Connor
- 128, 105 – Xu Si
- 127, 105 – Ken Doherty
- 117, 111 – Matthew Selt
- 116 – Lu Ning
- 111, 101 – Gerard Greene
- 108, 103 – Chris Wakelin
- 108 – Luca Brecel
- 108 – Ryan Day
- 108 – Mei Xiwen
- 106 – Ian Burns
- 104 – Ricky Walden
- 102, 101 – Kyren Wilson
- 102 – Martin O'Donnell
- 101 – Rory McLeod
- 101 – Yuan Sijun
- 100 – Sam Baird
- 100 – Robert Milkins
- 100 – Joe Swail
