= Yuan Sijun =

Chinese snooker player (born 2000)

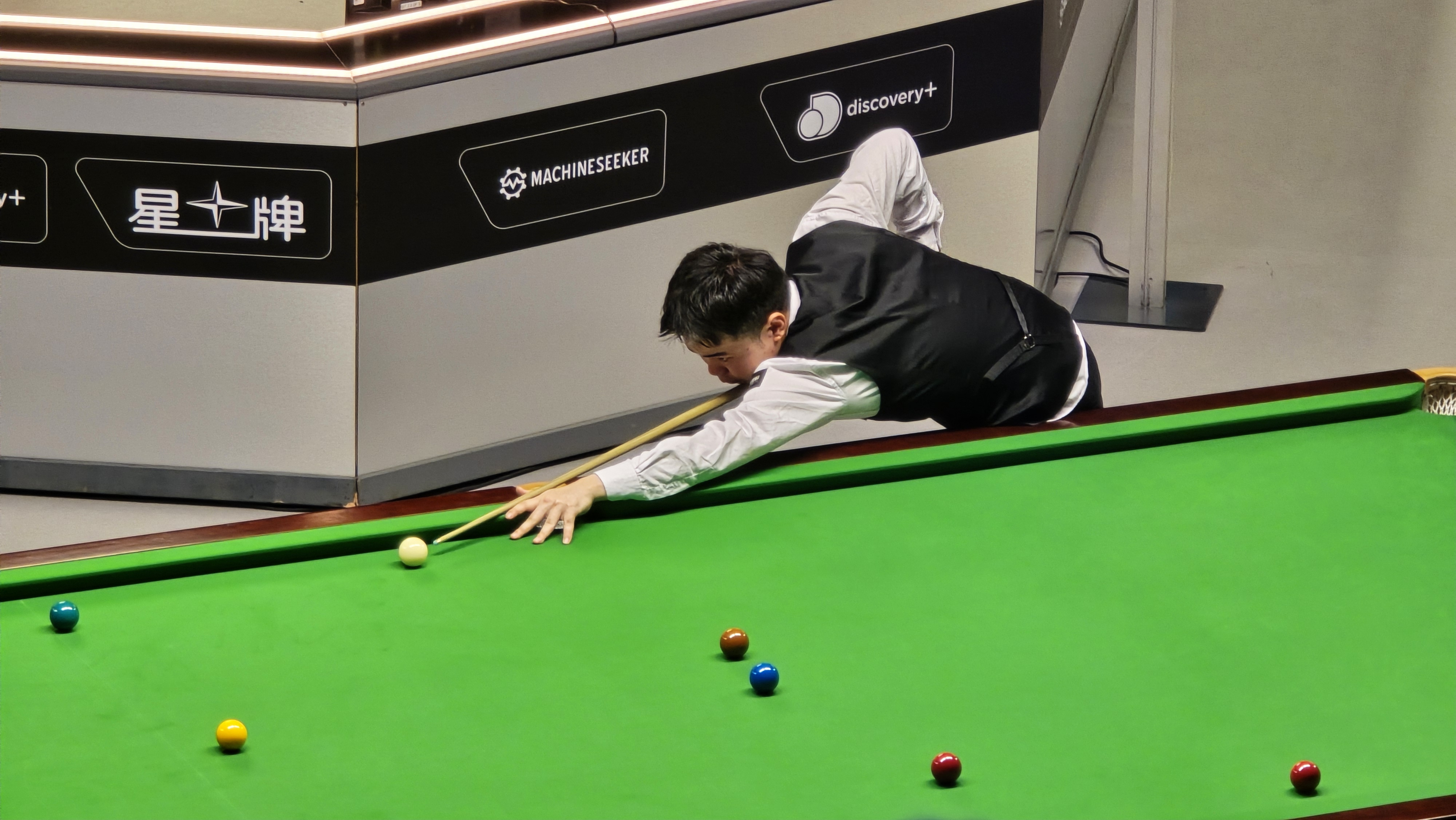
- Yuan in 2025

Personal information
- Born: 29 May 2000 (age 26) Nanchang, Jiangxi, China

Sport
- Country: China
- Sport: Snooker
- Professional: 2017–present
- Highest ranking: 26 (October 2026)
- Current ranking: 27 (as of 26 October 2026)
- Century breaks: 147 (as of 4 November 2026)
- Best ranking finish: Runner-up (2026 Shenzhen Open)

Yuan Sijun
- Simplified Chinese: 袁思俊
- Traditional Chinese: 袁思俊
Transcriptions
Standard Mandarin
- Hanyu Pinyin: Yuán Sījùn
Yue: Cantonese
- Yale Romanization: Yùhn Sī Jeun
- Jyutping: Jyun⁴ Si¹ Zoen³

Yuan Sijun (Chinese: 袁思俊; born 29 May 2000) is a Chinese professional snooker player.

== Career ==
Yuan started to play snooker at the age of 10 and played as a wildcard in many professional tournaments between ages of 13 and 16. Yuan first drew attention in 2016 when, at the age of 15, he defeated world number 13 Martin Gould in a 5–0 whitewash in the opening round of the 2016 China Open before losing 2–5 to Graeme Dott. Remarkably, when he again faced Martin Gould in the 2016 Shanghai Masters in October 2016, he produced the same result, a 5–0 win.

In 2015, Yuan entered the 2015 ACBS Asian Under-21 Snooker Championship where he reached the final, but lost eventually to Akani Songsermsawad. Two years later, Yuan once again made it to the final, where he defeated Fan Zhengyi 6–2 to win the Asian Under-21 Championship; as a result, he was given a two-year card on the professional World Snooker Tour for the 2017–18 and 2018–19 seasons. Yuan began the 2017–18 as the youngest player on the professional tour.

=== 2017/2018 season ===
Yuan's first match as a professional was a narrow loss to Oliver Lines in the 2017 Riga Masters qualifiers on 31 May 2017, two days after his 17th birthday. His first win was a 4–2 defeat of Allan Taylor in the European Masters qualifiers. Yuan's best wins were 4–1 against Joe Perry in the English Open (which included two centuries), and 5–4 against Shaun Murphy in the Shanghai Masters. In the World Championship, he beat Fergal O'Brien 10–5, before losing 10–9 to Matthew Stevens, despite leading 9-7 and missing several chances to win. In total Yuan managed only 8 wins in his first season, and ended the season ranked 92.

=== 2018/2019 season ===
With wins over Ricky Walden, Alexander Ursenbacher, Ding Junhui and Mark King, Yuan reached his first quarter-final at the China Championship, before losing to World No.1 Mark Selby. For the next few months, he progressed steadily, beating the likes of Mark Allen and Kyren Wilson. In the German Masters, he beat 4-time World Champion John Higgins 5–4 on the final black, somewhat controversially as the cue-ball appeared to touch the rest (a foul stroke) after the players had shaken hands.

Yuan's solid results in the first half of the 2018/19 season lifted him into the top-32 on the 1-year rankings, thus qualifying for the World Grand Prix in Cheltenham. He beat World Champion Mark Williams 4-3 and Stephen Maguire 4–2 to reach his second quarter-final, losing to flatmate Xiao Guodong 5–4.

Just shy of his 19th birthday, Yuan made remarkable progress in the 2018/19 season. He attracted praise from commentators Jimmy White, Ronnie O'Sullivan and Stephen Hendry, who described him as 'one of the best youngsters since the likes of Ding Junhui, Ronnie O'Sullivan, Mark Williams, or John Higgins'.

=== 2019/2020 season ===
In the International Championship Yuan suffered an agonising loss on the final black to Shaun Murphy 6–5, despite making 8 breaks over 50. This contributed to a loss of form, reaching the last 16 only once, in the Northern Ireland Open. With the arrival of COVID-19, the snooker season was suspended. Yuan Sijun returned to Nanchang, but was unable to play snooker due to lockdown restrictions. He did not return for the rescheduled World Championship.

=== 2020/2021 season ===
Yuan Sijun returned from China after the COVID-19 suspension in September 2020, having not picked up a cue for 6 months. This contributed to a poor season. Yuan's most notable achievement was reaching the third round of the Northern Ireland Open, beating close friend Luo Honghao and Tom Ford before eventually losing 4–0 to Ding Junhui.

In the World Championship he lost his first match by 6–5 to Rod Lawler, missing a simple pink in the final frame. This loss meant that he was relegated from the tour.

=== 2021/2022 season ===
Yuan Sijun entered the 2021 Q School to try to regain his tour card. He was successful in first event, beating Mitchell Mann 4–2 in the final match.

Yuan's best result of 2021-22 was a 3rd round appearance in the European Masters, beating Stuart Carrington and Ricky Walden, before losing to Liang Wenbo. He also scored wins over Matt Selt, Barry Hawkins and Mark Davis. At the World Championship, he reached the final qualifying round for the first time, with 6-3 wins over Ross Muir and Steven Hallworth, a 6–1 win over Ryan Day, before losing 10–7 to Liam Highfield. Yuan finished the season ranked 68. Along with several other Chinese players, Yuan did not return to China during the summer break.

=== 2022/2023 season ===
The first tournament of the 2022–23 season was the Summer Championship League. Yuan Sijun won his first round group, against Barry Hawkins, Ken Doherty and Lei Peifan, without losing a frame. In the second round group, he continued this run by beating World Champion Ronnie O'Sullivan 3–0. But 2-2 draws against Ali Carter and Pang Junxu meant he finished 2nd in the group.

=== 2026/2027 season ===
Sijun reached his first ranking final at the 2026 Shenzhen Open, and was defeated 5–10 by Wu Yize.

== Personal life ==
At the start of the 2018/2019 season, Yuan Sijun moved to Darlington and is based at the Q House Academy. In 2020, he moved to the newly opened Ding Junhui Snooker Academy in Sheffield.

== Performance and rankings timeline ==
Tournament	2013/ 14	2014/ 15	2015/ 16	2016/ 17	2017/ 18	2018/ 19	2019/ 20	2020/ 21	2021/ 22	2022/ 23	2023/ 24	2024/ 25	2025/ 26	2026/ 27
Ranking (Note: It shows the ranking at the beginning of the season)	(Note: He was an amateur)				(Note: New players on the Main Tour don't have a ranking)	71	53	45	(Note: Players qualified through Q School started the season without ranking points)	68	50	38	30	30
Ranking tournaments
Championship League	Non-Ranking Event							RR	RR	2R	RR	RR	2R	RR
China Open	WR	WR	2R	A	1R	1R	Tournament Not Held							LQ
Wuhan Open	Tournament Not Held										3R	2R	2R	1R
British Open	Tournament Not Held								1R	QF	2R	2R	1R	LQ
English Open	Not Held			A	3R	3R	2R	2R	LQ	2R	3R	LQ	2R	3R
Shenzhen Open (Note: The event was called the Xi'an Grand Prix (2024/2025–2025/2026))	Tournament Not Held											2R	2R	F
Northern Ireland Open	Not Held			A	2R	2R	4R	3R	1R	LQ	QF	1R	3R	LQ
International Championship	WR	A	A	1R	LQ	3R	1R	Not Held			LQ	2R	2R	3R
UK Championship	A	A	A	A	1R	1R	2R	1R	1R	LQ	1R	LQ	LQ	
Shoot Out	Non-Ranking Event			A	1R	1R	1R	WD	2R	4R	1R	1R	QF	
Scottish Open	Not Held			A	1R	3R	2R	1R	LQ	LQ	1R	1R	3R	
German Masters	A	A	A	A	LQ	2R	1R	1R	LQ	LQ	3R	SF	LQ	
Welsh Open	A	A	A	A	1R	2R	2R	1R	2R	QF	LQ	3R	2R	
World Grand Prix	NH	NR	DNQ	DNQ	DNQ	QF	DNQ	DNQ	DNQ	DNQ	1R	1R	2R	
Players Championship (Note: The event was called the Players Championship Grand Final (2013/2014–2015/2016))	DNQ	DNQ	DNQ	DNQ	DNQ	DNQ	DNQ	DNQ	DNQ	DNQ	DNQ	DNQ	DNQ	
World Open	1R	Not Held		A	LQ	1R	LQ	Not Held			2R	1R	LQ	
Tour Championship	Tournament Not Held					DNQ	DNQ	DNQ	DNQ	DNQ	DNQ	DNQ	DNQ	
World Championship	A	A	A	A	LQ	LQ	A	LQ	LQ	LQ	LQ	LQ	LQ	
Non-ranking tournaments
Shanghai Masters	Ranking Event					A	A	Not Held			A	A	1R	
Championship League	A	A	A	A	A	A	A	A	A	A	A	A	WD	
Former ranking tournaments
Shanghai Masters	WR	WR	WR	1R	1R	NR		Not Held			Non-Ranking Event			
Indian Open	A	A	NH	A	LQ	2R	Tournament Not Held							
Riga Masters (Note: The event was called the Riga Open (2014/2015–2015/2016))	NH	MR		A	LQ	LQ	2R	Tournament Not Held						
China Championship	Not Held			NR	LQ	QF	1R	Tournament Not Held						
WST Pro Series	Tournament Not Held							RR	Tournament Not Held					
Turkish Masters	Tournament Not Held								2R	Tournament Not Held				
Gibraltar Open	Not Held		MR	A	1R	SF	2R	1R	3R	Tournament Not Held				
WST Classic	Tournament Not Held									2R	Tournament Not Held			
European Masters	Not Held			A	1R	1R	LQ	1R	3R	1R	LQ	Not Held		
Saudi Arabia Masters	Tournament Not Held											5R	5R	NH
Former non-ranking tournaments
Six-red World Championship	A	A	RR	3R	A	A	A	Not Held		LQ	Tournament Not Held			
Haining Open	NH	MR		1R	A	A	A	NH	A	W	Tournament Not Held			

Performance Table Legend
LQ	lost in the qualifying draw	#R	lost in the early rounds of the tournament (WR = Wildcard round, RR = Round robin)	QF	lost in the quarter-finals
SF	lost in the semi-finals	F	lost in the final	W	won the tournament
DNQ	did not qualify for the tournament	A	did not participate in the tournament	WD	withdrew from the tournament

NH / Not Held	means an event was not held.
NR / Non-Ranking Event	means an event is/was no longer a ranking event.
R / Ranking Event	means an event is/was a ranking event.
MR / Minor-Ranking Event	means an event is/was a minor-ranking event.

== Career finals ==
=== Ranking finals: 1 ===
Outcome	No.	Year	Championship	Opponent in the final	Score
Runner-up	1.	2026	Shenzhen Open	(China) Wu Yize	5-10

=== Non-ranking finals: 1 (1 title) ===
Outcome	No.	Year	Championship	Opponent in the final	Score
Winner	1.	2023	Haining Open	(China) Wu Yize	5–1

=== Pro-am finals: 1 (1 title) ===
Outcome	No.	Year	Championship	Opponent in the final	Score
Winner	1.	2019	Huizhou Open	(China) Pang Junxu	5–2

=== Amateur finals: 2 (1 title) ===
Outcome	No.	Year	Championship	Opponent in the final	Score
Runner-up	1.	2015	Asian Under-21 Championship	(Thailand) Sunny Akani	4–6
Winner	1.	2017	Asian Under-21 Championship	(China) Fan Zhengyi	6–2
