= 2021 World Snooker Championship =

Professional snooker tournament

2021 Betfred World Snooker Championship

Tournament information
- Dates: 17 April – 3 May 2021
- Venue: Crucible Theatre
- City: Sheffield
- Country: England
- Organisation: World Snooker Tour
- Format: Ranking event
- Total prize fund: £2,395,000
- Winner's share: £500,000
- Highest break: Shaun Murphy (ENG) (144)

Final
- Champion: Mark Selby (ENG)
- Runner-up: Shaun Murphy (ENG)
- Score: 18–15

The 2021 World Snooker Championship (officially the 2021 Betfred World Snooker Championship) was a professional snooker tournament that took place from 17 April to 3 May 2021 at the Crucible Theatre in Sheffield, England. It was the 45th consecutive year the World Snooker Championship was held at the Crucible Theatre and the 15th and final ranking event of the 2020–21 snooker season. It was organised by the World Snooker Tour. The event was sponsored by sports betting company Betfred and broadcast by the BBC, Eurosport and Matchroom Sport. It featured a total prize fund of £2,395,000 of which the winner received £500,000.

Qualifying for the tournament took place between 5 and 14 April 2021 at the English Institute of Sport in Sheffield. There were 128 participants in the qualifying rounds, consisting of a mix of professional and invited amateur players. The main stage of the tournament featured 32 players: the top 16 players from the snooker world rankings and an additional 16 players from the qualifying rounds. Ronnie O'Sullivan was the defending champion, having won his sixth world title at the previous year's event, where he defeated Kyren Wilson 18–8 in the final. O'Sullivan lost in the second round to Anthony McGill 12–13. Mark Selby defeated Shaun Murphy 18–15 in the final to win his fourth world title and the 20th ranking title of his career. There were a record 108 century breaks made at the Crucible, with an additional 106 made in qualifying rounds. The tournament's highest break was 144 by Murphy in the second round.

== Background ==
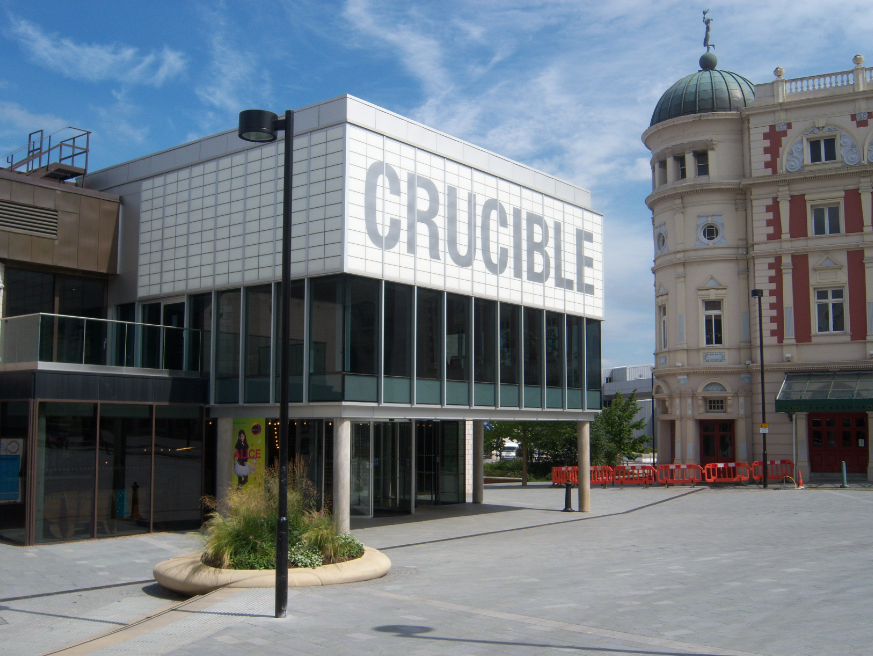
The main draw of the tournament was played at the Crucible Theatre in Sheffield, England.

The World Snooker Championship features 32 professional players competing in one-on-one snooker matches in a single-elimination format, each match played over a number of frames. The 32 players for the event are selected through a mix of the snooker world rankings and a pre-tournament qualifying stage. The first World Snooker Championship final took place in 1927. The final was held at Camkin's Hall in Birmingham, England, and the title was won by Joe Davis. Since 1977, the event has been held at the Crucible Theatre in Sheffield, England. It is organised by World Snooker along with the World Professional Billiards and Snooker Association (WPBSA). As of 2022, Stephen Hendry and Ronnie O’Sullivan are the event's most successful participants in the modern era, having both won the championship seven times. The 2020 championship had been won by English player Ronnie O'Sullivan, who defeated compatriot Kyren Wilson in the final 18–8 to win his sixth world title. The event was returned to its traditional April schedule after the 2020 championship was delayed to late July because of the COVID-19 pandemic. The winner of the 2021 championship received £500,000 from a total prize fund of £2,395,000.

=== Format ===
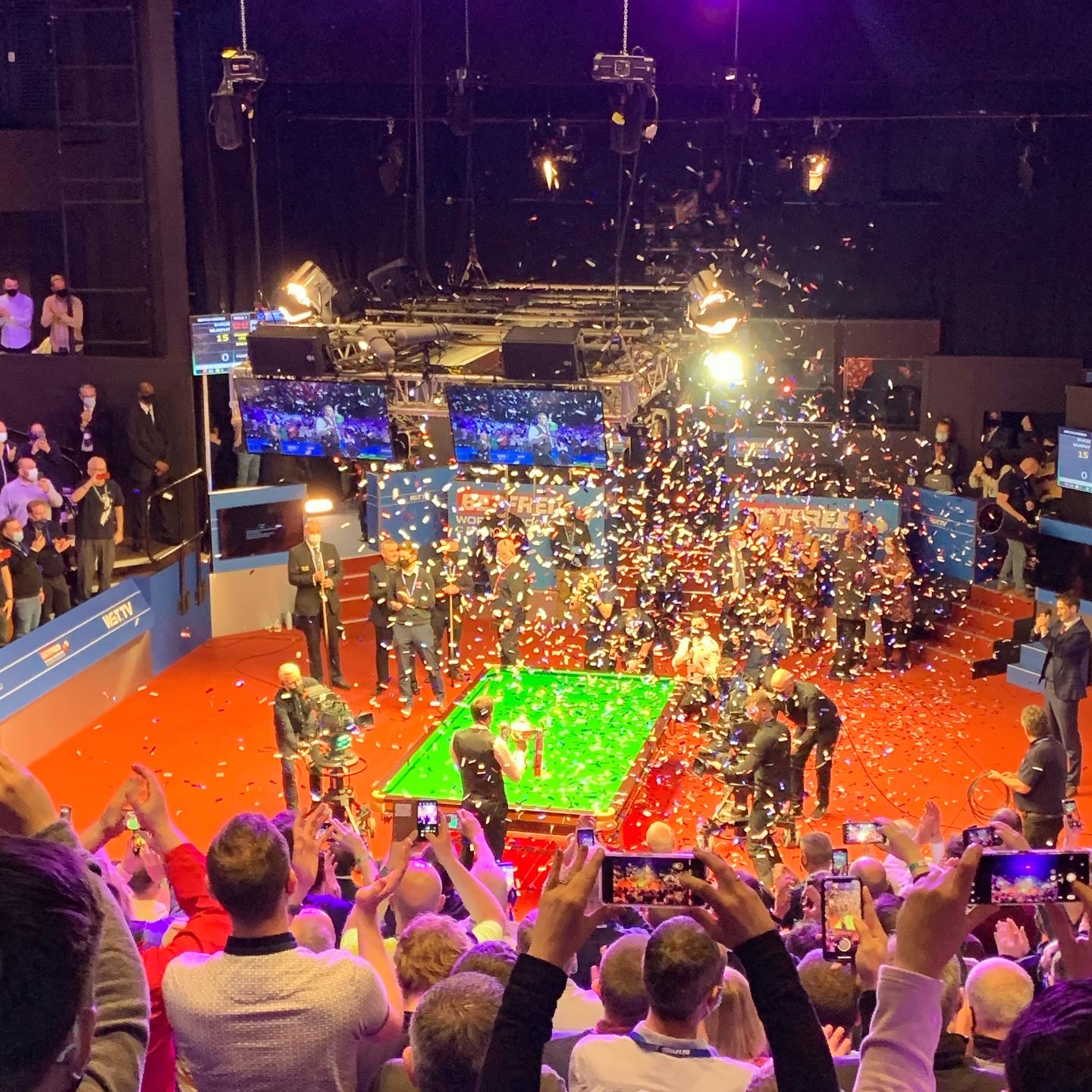
The event was sponsored by sports betting company Betfred, who also presented the trophy (trophy presentation pictured).

The 2021 World Snooker Championship took place between 17 April and 3 May 2021 at the Crucible Theatre. The event featured a 32-player main draw, preceded by a 128-player qualifying draw held at the English Institute of Sport. Qualifying for the event was played between 5 and 14 April, finishing three days before the start of the main draw. The qualifying stage was played over four rounds, and the higher-ranked players were seeded and given byes to the later rounds. The tournament was the last of 15 ranking events in the 2020–21 season on the World Snooker Tour. It was the 45th consecutive year that the tournament had been held at the Crucible, and the 53rd successive world championship to be contested through the modern knockout format. The tournament was sponsored by sports betting company Betfred, as it had been since 2009.

The top 16 players in the latest 2020–21 snooker world rankings automatically qualified for the main draw as seeded players. Defending champion Ronnie O'Sullivan was automatically seeded first overall. The remaining 15 seeds were allocated based on the latest world rankings, released after the 2021 Tour Championship. Matches in the first round of the main draw were played as the best of 19 frames, second-round matches and quarter-finals were played as the best of 25 frames, and the semi-finals were played as the best of 33 frames. The final was played over two days as a best-of-35-frames match.

=== Coverage ===
The tournament was broadcast in the United Kingdom on the BBC and Eurosport. The event was broadcast in Europe and Australia by Eurosport. Other international broadcasts were provided by Kuaishou, Migu, Zhibo.tv, Youku, and CCTV in China; by NowTV in Hong Kong; and by DAZN in Canada, the United States, and Brazil. In territories where there was no other coverage, the event was broadcast by Matchroom Sport.

On 13 March 2021, World Snooker announced that the championship would welcome a limited number of spectators, as part of the Events Research Programme run by the British government in response to the ongoing COVID-19 pandemic. Details were announced on 7 April, beginning with an audience of 33 per cent of the arena's full capacity for the first round, an increasing number of spectators through the tournament, and a full-capacity crowd to be admitted for the final. All spectators were tested for COVID-19 before and after attending the event.

=== Prize fund ===
The winner of the event received £500,000 from a total prize fund of £2,395,000. The breakdown of prize money is shown below:

- Winner: £500,000
- Runner-up: £200,000
- Semi-finalists: £100,000
- Quarter-finalists: £50,000
- Last 16: £30,000
- Last 32: £20,000
- Last 48: £15,000
- Last 80: £10,000
- Last 112: £5,000
- Highest break (qualifying stage included): £15,000

== Summary ==
=== Qualifying ===
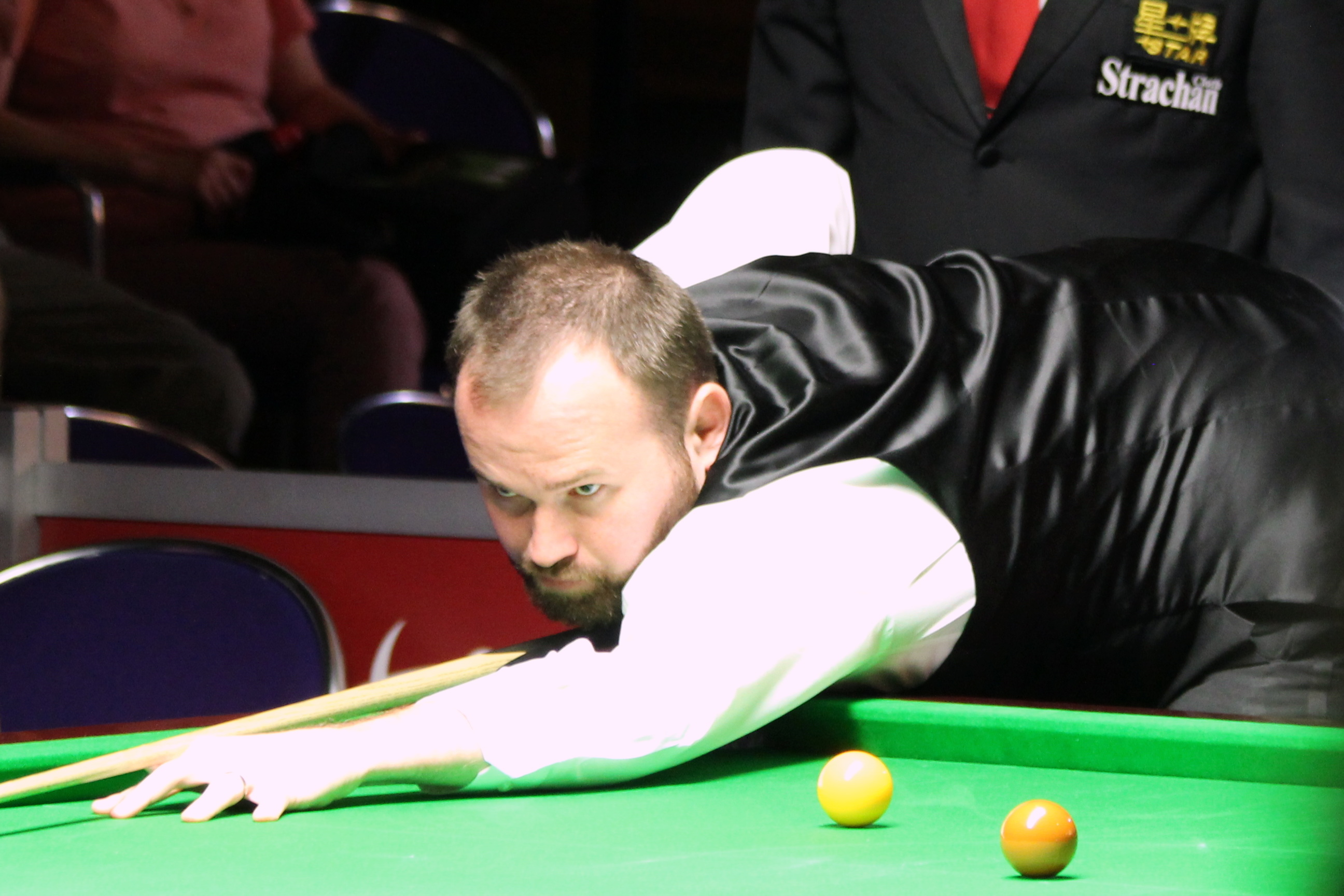
Mark Joyce progressed through qualifying for the first time.

Qualifying for the event was held between 5 and 14 April over four rounds, and 16 players qualified for the main stage. Seven-time champion Stephen Hendry was playing in the World Championship for the first time since announcing his retirement in 2012. He met six-time runner-up Jimmy White in the first round, the pair having met in four previous finals. Hendry defeated White 6–3, but lost his second-round match 1–6 to Xu Si. The defeat for White meant he was not ranked high enough to remain on the World Snooker Tour, but he was later given an invitational place for the following two seasons.

Three-time World Championship semi-finalist Alan McManus announced his retirement after his second-round loss to Bai Langning. Bai reached the final round of qualifying by defeating Ben Woollaston 6–5. Two amateur players progressed through the first round. Julien Leclercq defeated Soheil Vahedi 6–5 in the first round, but lost 2–6 to Chang Bingyu. Florian Nüßle defeated world number 111 Ben Hancorn in the first round 6–2, but lost to world number 50 Mark King 3–6 in the second round. World number 84 Jamie Clarke was trailing 0–5 in his second-round match against Jamie O'Neill, but won six frames in a row to win the match. He then defeated world number 20 Joe Perry 6–2 to reach the final round of qualifying.

The fourth and final round of qualifying took place on 13 and 14 April. Matches in this round were played over the best of 19 frames. Four players were competing having started in the opening round: Bai Langning, Jamie Clarke, Igor Figueiredo, and Steven Hallworth, but all four lost their final qualifying match. Bai lost 5–10 to Martin Gould; Clarke led 7–2, but won just one more frame, as he lost 8–10 to Mark Davis; Figueiredo lost 7–10 to Mark Joyce and Hallworth lost to 2019 semi-finalist Gary Wilson 3–10.

=== First round ===
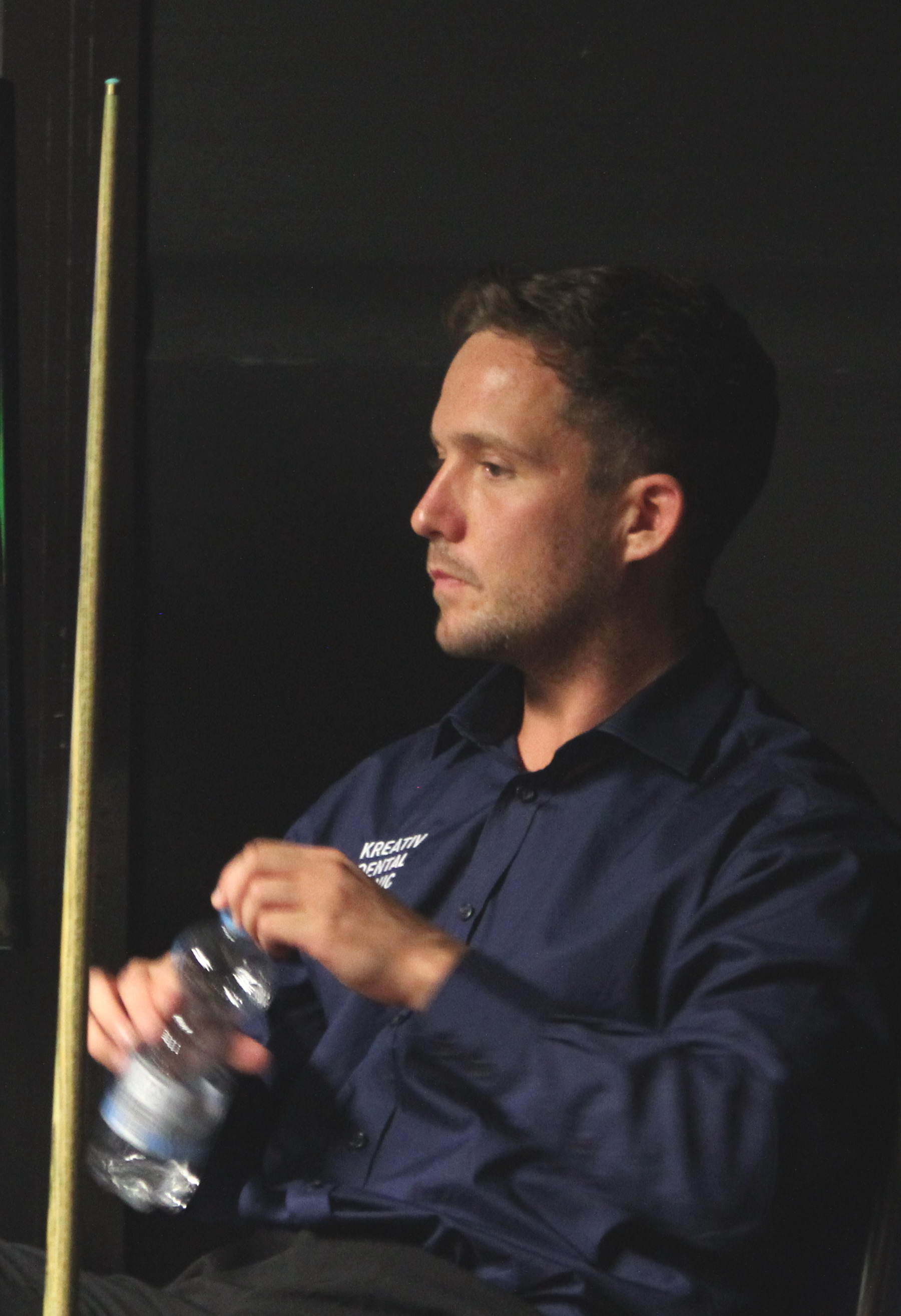
Jamie Jones qualified for the second round for the first time since completing a ban in 2018.

The draw for the main stage of the tournament was held on 15 April 2021. The opening round took place between 17 and 22 April, each match played as the best of 19 frames. Defending champion O'Sullivan played debutant Joyce in the opening match. O'Sullivan led 3–1, before Joyce made two half-century breaks to trail by one frame. O'Sullivan won the last two frames of the first session to take a 6–3 lead. Joyce won the first frame in the second session, but O'Sullivan took the next to lead 7–4 and then scored three century breaks of 124, 137, and 112 to win the match 10–4. Reigning Masters champion Yan Bingtao played Gould, making five breaks higher than 50 and tying the score at 4–4, having only played eight frames in their opening session. Yan then made two century breaks to lead 8–5, and won the match 10–6. David Gilbert, the 2019 semi-finalist, won seven of the first eight frames of his match against Chris Wakelin, winning the first session 7–2 and the match 10–4. The 2010 champion and third seed Neil Robertson led 6–3 over Liang Wenbo after their first session. Robertson won all four frames in the second session to progress with a 10–3 victory.

Jamie Jones had returned to the tour for the 2020–21 season, having lost his professional status in 2019 after serving a year-long ban for contravening betting regulations. Jones trailed Stephen Maguire 0–3, but pulled ahead to lead 5–4 after the first session, and took all five frames played in the second session to win the match 10–4. He commented that he felt the ban had caused him to "lose everything", while Maguire commented that he was "frustrated. I don’t think there's a word for how I played. If there is a word, I'd get fined!". The previous year's semi-finalist Anthony McGill led Ricky Walden 5–4 in the first session, and won five of the next six to win 10–5. Four-time champion John Higgins played qualifier Tian Pengfei. The pair played just seven of the nine allotted frames in their opening session due to slow play, Tian winning four of the first five to lead 4–3. In the second session, Tian took three of the first four frames to lead 7–4. Higgins, however, won five frames in a row to lead 9–7 before the match was halted as their afternoon session overran. When the match resumed later, Higgins took the 17th frame to win 10–7. After the match, Higgins suggested that Tian would be "kicking himself" for not taking advantage of his own "soul destroying" performance.

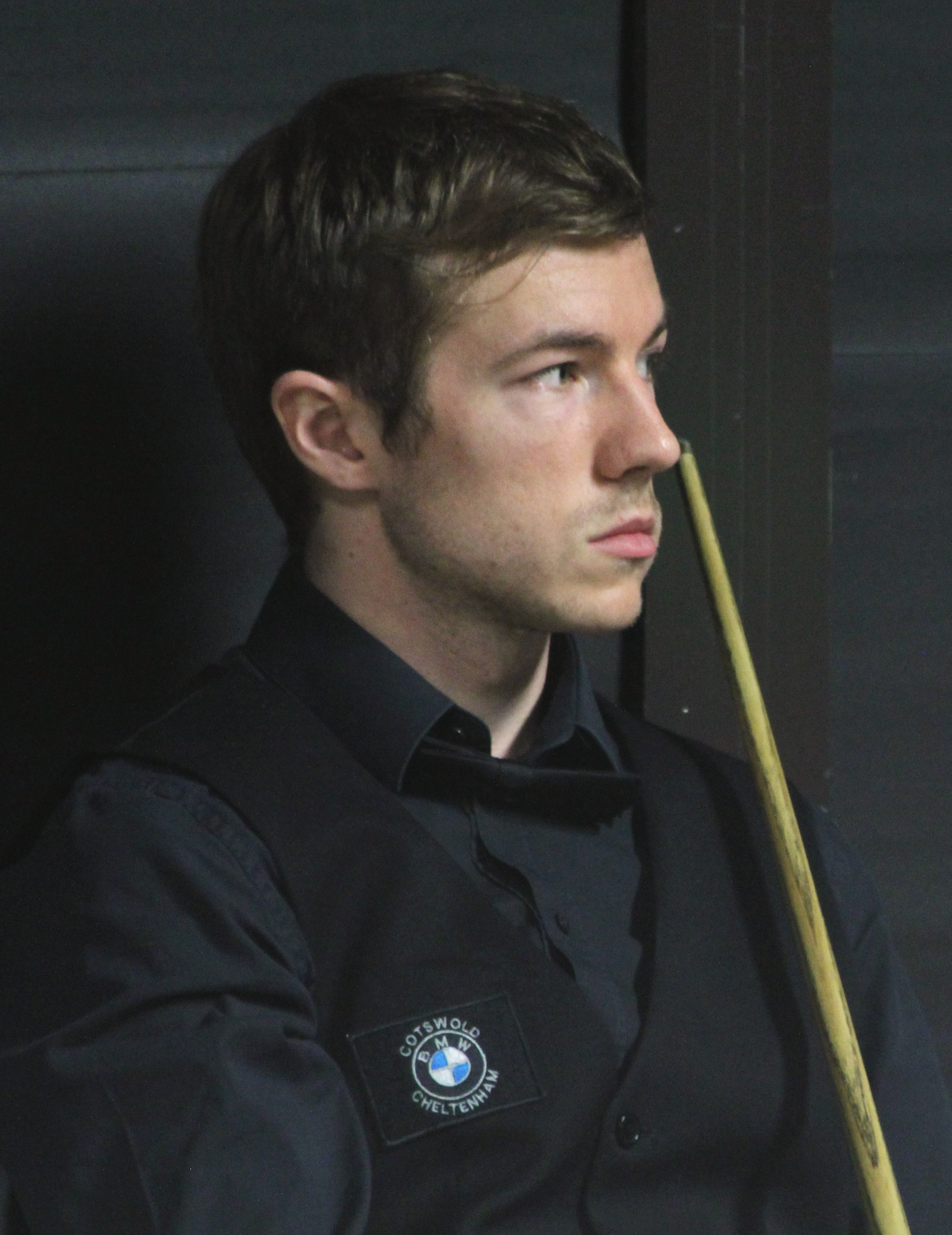
Jack Lisowski won his first round match 10–9 over two-time finalist Ali Carter.

Kyren Wilson trailed 1–5 in his match against Gary Wilson, but recovered by winning the last three frames of the opening session to only trail 4–5. He also took the first three frames of the second session to move ahead 7–5. Gary Wilson made two half-century breaks to tie the match 7–7, before Kyren scored a half century and a break of 119 to lead 9–7. Gary Wilson took frame 18, but Kyren Wilson won the match with a break of 73. Jack Lisowski trailed Ali Carter 1–3, but ended up leading 5–4 after the first session. The pair were later tied at 8–8, before Carter won frame 17 and Lisowski won the next with a break of 82 to force a deciding frame. Lisowski made a break of 60 to win the final frame and the match. When interviewed afterwards, he admitted that Carter was the "worst draw" but added: "I've never won a tournament so why not make the World Championship the first one?" Mark Allen defeated Lyu Haotian, having led 7–2 after the first session and then winning three straight frames to take the match 10–2. The first session of the match between Ding Junhui and Stuart Bingham ended with a fluke on the final black ball, Ding attempting a pot, in which the black ended in the opposite corner from where he was attempting a pot, giving him a 5–4 lead. Bingham made breaks of 60, 92, and 104, en route to a 9–8 advantage, before Ding took frame 18 to tie the match and force a deciding frame. This final frame was delayed until after the next session ended; Ding made a break of 45, but misjudged a pot on a red ball, allowing Bingham to make a break of 70 to win the match.

World number one Judd Trump defeated Liam Highfield 10–4, having won the opening session 7–2. Barry Hawkins took a 6–3 lead over Matthew Selt after their first session of play, and took four of the five frames in the second session to win the match 10–4. Three-time champion Mark Williams trailed 0–2 at the start of his match against Sam Craigie, but won five of the next seven frames to take a 5–4 lead. On the resumption of play, Williams won five straight frames to take the match 10–4. Commenting afterwards he indicated he was not going to turn down any opportunity to pot a ball after that first session, that he would "go for everything". The 2005 champion Shaun Murphy trailed 3–5 in his match against Mark Davis, but won the final frame of the first session with a break of 113. Murphy credited this century for giving him additional motivation for the second session as he won six of the eight frames to seal a 10–7 victory. The final match of the first round was contested between Mark Selby and Kurt Maflin. Selby won the first three frames, before Maflin took the fourth with a break of 91. Maflin only scored six points across the next four frames as Selby finished the first session 8–1 ahead. He then took the next two frames to win the match 10–1. Only two of the sixteen qualifiers advanced to the second round.

=== Second round ===
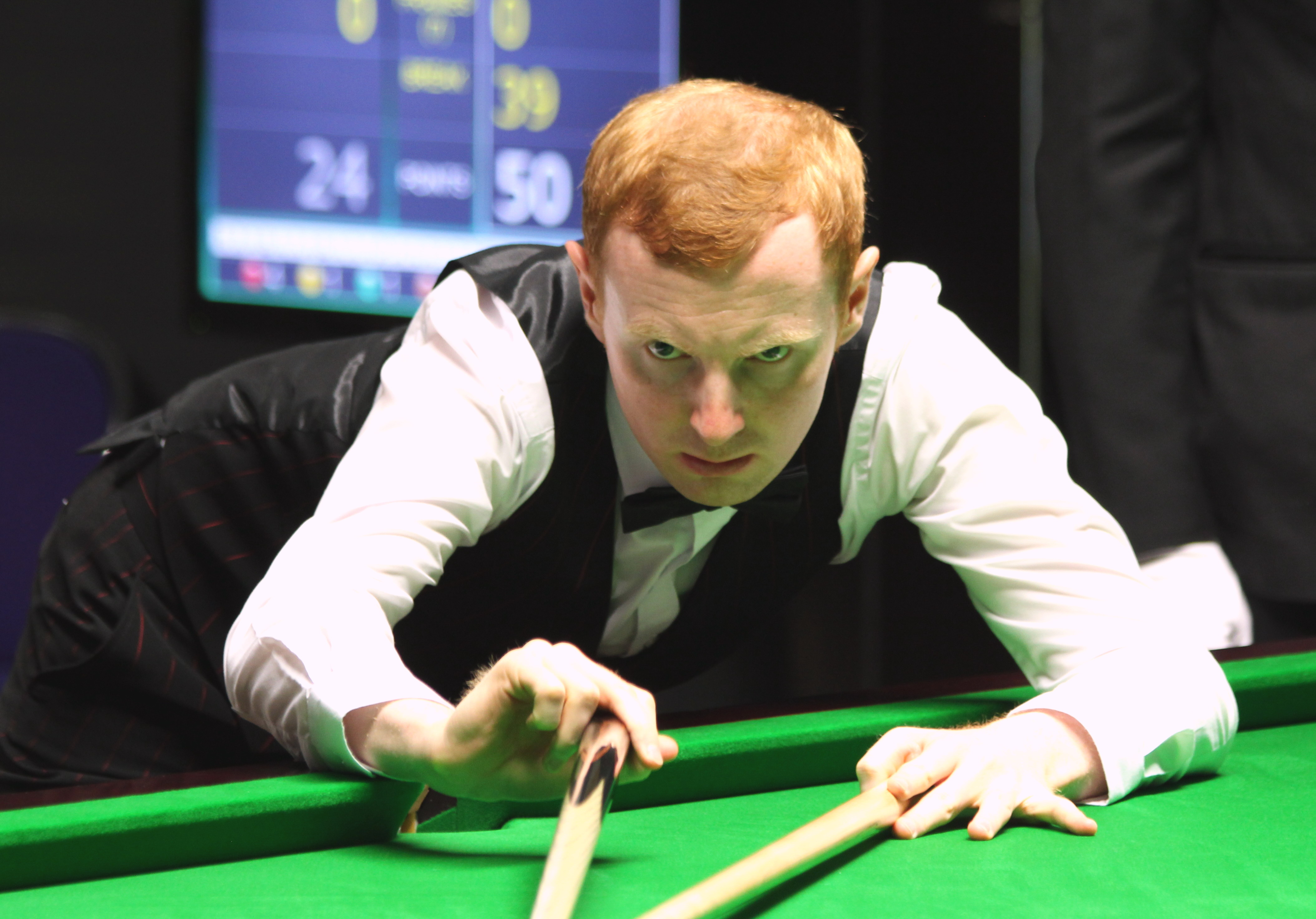
Anthony McGill defeated the defending champion Ronnie O'Sullivan on a deciding frame 13–12.

The second-round matches were played from 22 to 26 April, as the best of 25 frames over three sessions. O'Sullivan met McGill, who had never defeated him in their six professional matches. O'Sullivan made breaks of 81, 105 and 138 to lead 4–1, but McGill won the final three frames to tie the match 4–4 after the first session. McGill also won the next four frames (seven in a row) with breaks of 71, 126 and 89. O'Sullivan won frame 13, before McGill won the next two. The final frame of the second session was won by O'Sullivan to trail 6–10. The third session saw O'Sullivan win the first five frames to lead 11–10. McGill won the next frame, before O'Sullivan won frame 23. McGill forced a deciding frame, tying the scores at 12–12 with a break of 136. O'Sullivan had the first chance to score points in the frame, but missed a pot on a red, allowing McGill to win the frame and match.

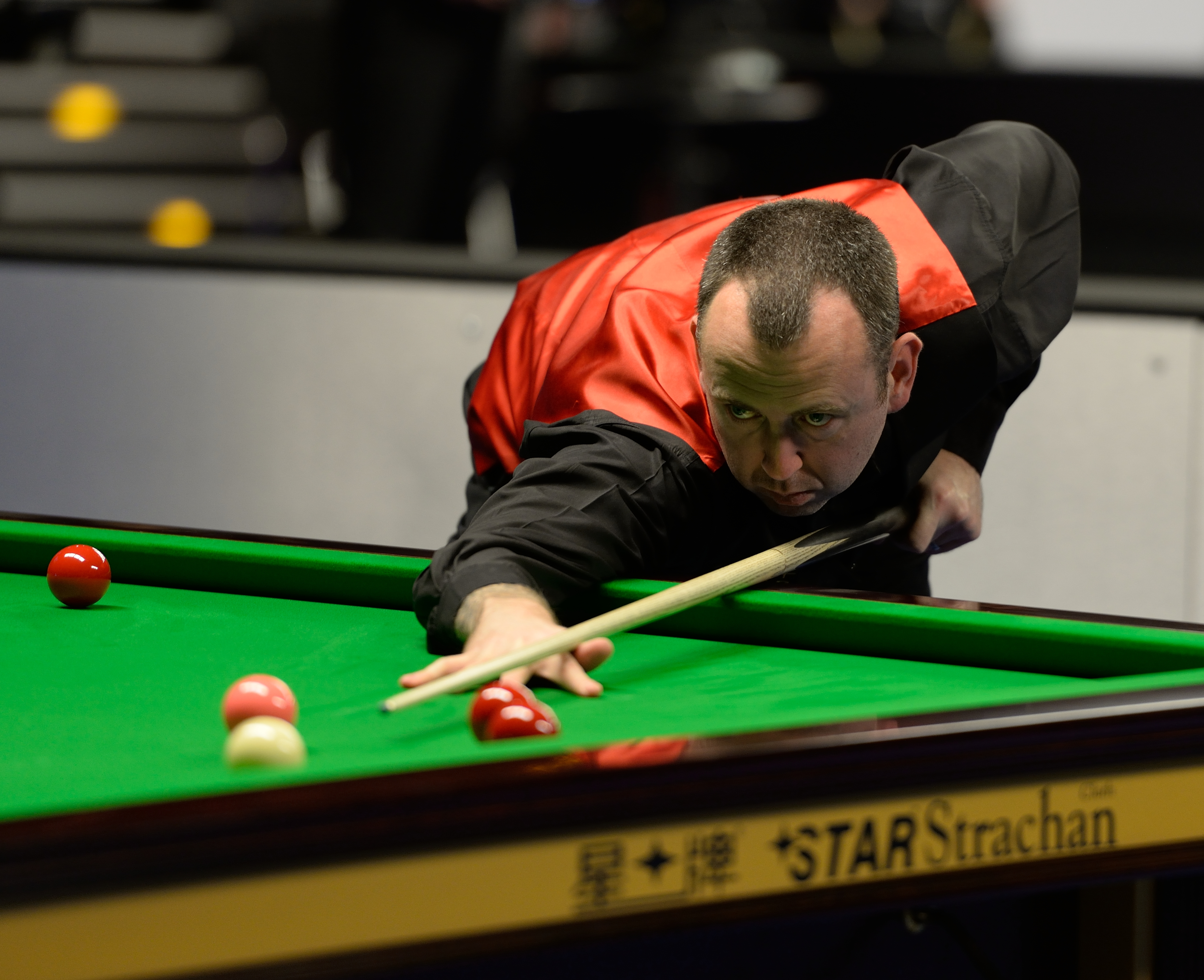
Mark Williams defeated John Higgins 13–7, in a rematch of the 2018 final.

Robertson met Lisowski and led 5–3 and then 9–7 after the second session. He made breaks of 126 and 87 to go 11–7 ahead, before going in-off in the next, allowing Lisowski to win the frame. He made a break of 71 in frame 20 and won the match two frames later, a 13–9 victory. This was Robertson's sixth successive victory over Lisowski. Robertson, however, praised Lisowski's play, saying "Jack did really well throughout the whole match... I really want to see [him] do well. He's such a nice guy and so talented". Wilson led Hawkins 9–4 before Hawkins won the final three frames of the second session to trail by two. Hawkins made breaks of 107 and 53 to tie the match at 9–9, but Wilson won four more frames to win 13–10. The match contained 22 breaks of 50 or above in the 23 frames played. In a rematch of the 2018 World Snooker Championship final, Williams played Higgins. Williams lost three of the first four frames, but won nine successive frames to lead 10–3. Higgins won the final three frames of the second session, but Williams took three of the next four frames, all with breaks over 70, to complete a 13–7 victory. Williams commented that he was playing as well as he had during the 2002–03 snooker season, in which he won all three Triple Crown events.

The two remaining qualifiers left in the competition – Bingham and Jones – met in the second round. The pair were tied after the first session 4–4, with seven breaks over 50. During the second frame, with Bingham leading 109–0 with just two balls remaining, the referee awarded him the frame. Jones, however, wished to play on only to pot the pink ball, as he had not potted a ball to that point, but still lost the frame 109–6. Bingham won the second session, leading 10–6, before winning three frames in the third to win 13–6. Gilbert led Trump 3–1, but missed a black ball, allowing Trump to win the next four frames to lead after the first session. Gilbert won just two of the frames in the second session as Trump led 11–5 and went on to win 13–8. Murphy faced the last Chinese player remaining, Yan, and won the opening session 6–2, making the highest break of the tournament, a 144. Murphy also led by four frames after the second session 10–6, and won three of the four frames in the third session to win 13–7. Despite the loss, Yan made more half-century breaks than Murphy. Fourth seed Selby faced thirteenth seed Allen, and led 6–2 after the opening session, making six breaks over 50. Selby's lead was cut to 8–6, but he won the final frame of the second session to lead by three. He won the match taking four of the next five frames to win 13–7. Five of the top eight seeds made the quarter-finals.

=== Quarter-finals ===
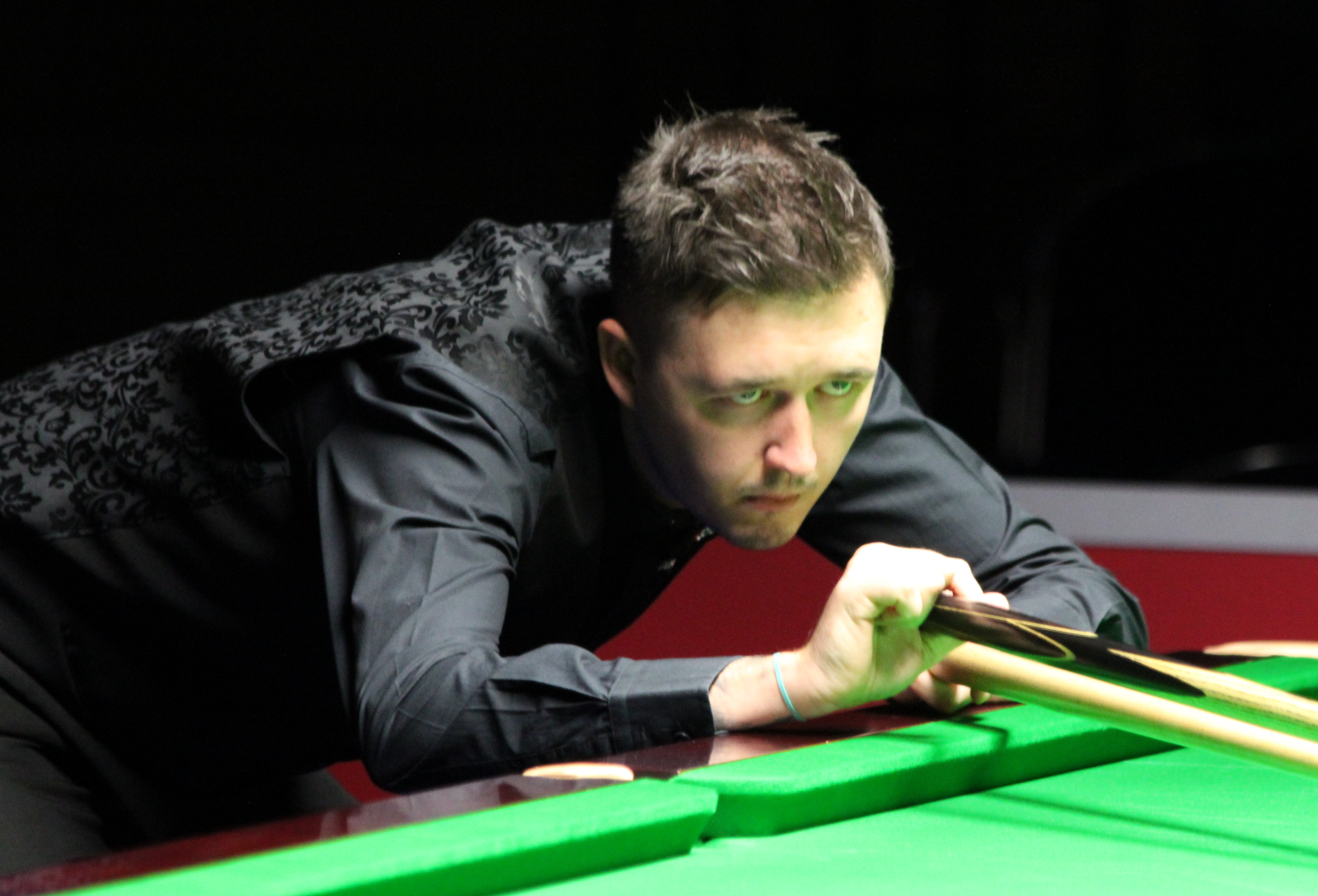
Kyren Wilson won five straight frames to defeat third seed Neil Robertson.

The quarter-finals were played on 27 and 28 April as best of 25 frames held over three sessions. Robertson played Wilson, and took a 5–3 lead after the opening session. After they were tied at 8–8 at the end of the second session, Wilson won five straight frames to win the match 13–8. Selby defeated Williams with a session to spare. With a pot success of 99 per cent in the first four frames, Selby won the opening session 6–2, before winning seven of the next eight to win 13–3. Throughout the tournament, Williams was playing a break off where he rolled up to the reds, rather than play a safety shot to bring the cue ball to the baulk end, which other players such as O'Sullivan had also attempted. Williams defended the strategy and commented that he had received backlash from fans and fellow players.

After making his 500th career century in frame five, Bingham led McGill 6–4 before McGill won five of the next six with breaks of 126, 83, 92, 130 and 75 to lead by two. In the final session, McGill won the first frame before Bingham made breaks of 75, 51, 90 and 91 to take an 11–10 lead. McGill had the first chance in frame 22, but went in-off, allowing Bingham to win the frame. However, McGill won the next two frames to force a deciding frame. McGill had the first chance in the final frame, but was unable to get position on a red after going into the pack. Bingham, however, made a break of 125 to win the match, which he called "the best of my career". McGill, however, was confident despite the loss, saying "What I am doing is working, I am going in the right direction." Murphy and Trump were tied at 4–4 after the first session, and then at 6–6 before Murphy won the last four frames of the second session to lead 10–6. Trump won five of the next six frames to tie the match at 11–11, during which Murphy made a high break of only 30. Murphy, however, won the next two frames to win the match 13–11.

=== Semi-finals ===
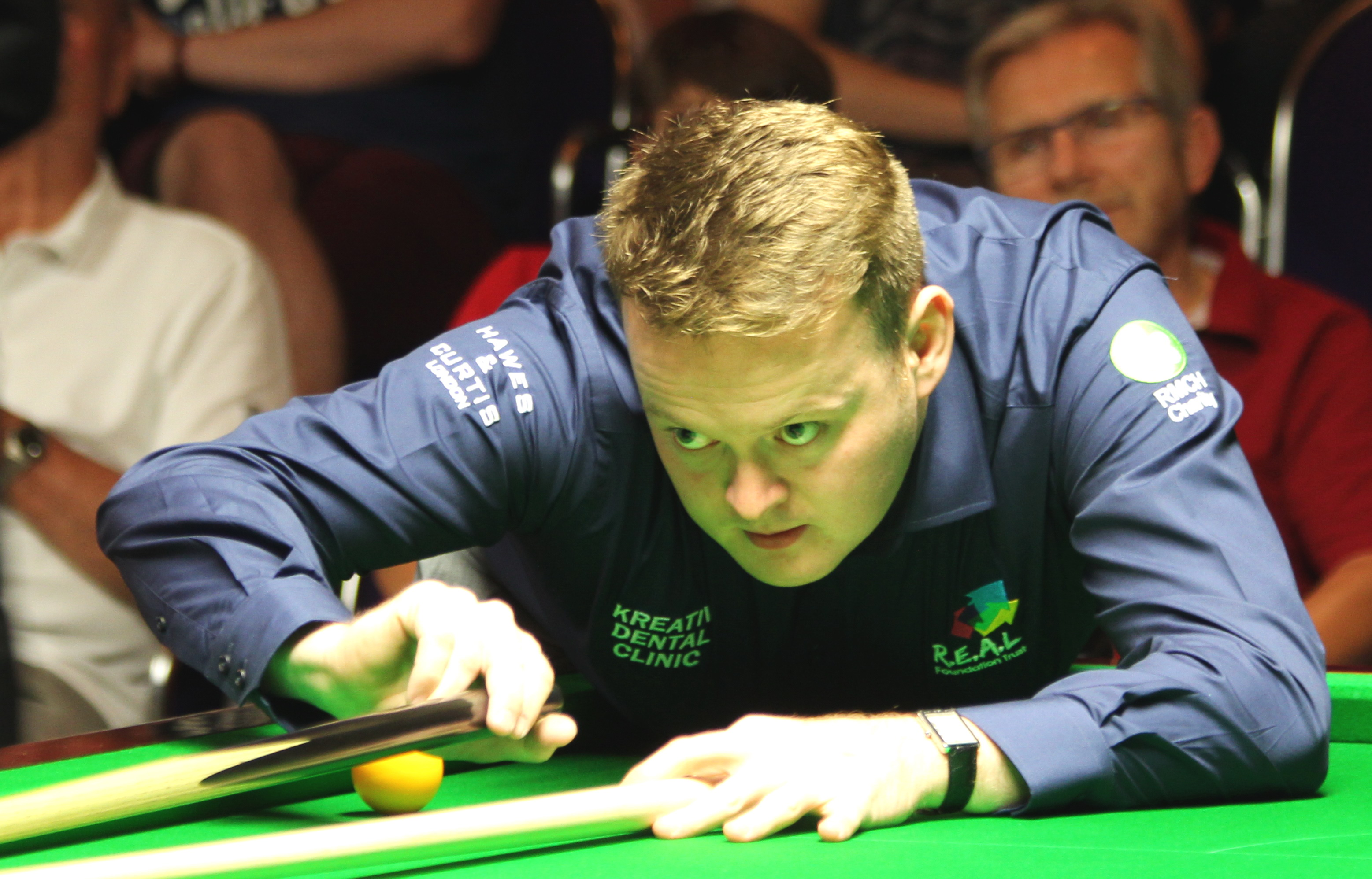
After trailing by six frames, Shaun Murphy defeated Kyren Wilson 17–12.

The semi-finals were played between 29 April and 1 May as the best of 33 frames held over four sessions. After Murphy won the opening frame, Wilson won the second frame and made a century break in frame three. After going 3–1 ahead, Wilson made breaks of 121 and 127, a total of 248 points without reply. Wilson ended the first session 6–2 ahead. After winning frame nine, Wilson was placed into a snooker from which he failed to escape on several occasions, conceding 53 foul points to Murphy and allowing him to win the frame. Wilson won frames 11, 13 and 14 to lead by six frames at 10–4. Murphy won the final two frames of the session, punching the air in celebration, to trail by four. Wilson won the first frame of the third session, but Murphy won six of the next seven frames to tie the match 12–12. In the final session, Murphy won five straight frames to win the match 17–12. In total, Murphy won 13 out of the last 15 frames to win the match. After the match, Wilson commented that some of Murphy's celebrations were "theatrical", but Murphy replied that they were "in a theatre and we are putting on a show."

Bingham took the opening frame against Selby, but trailed 1–3 into the mid-session interval. Bingham, however, made breaks of 92 and 82 in winning three straight frames to lead 4–3 and the match was tied at 4–4 after the first session. Selby made a break of 52 in frame nine, but still lost the frame as Bingham led again at 6–5. Selby won four of the next five frames to lead 9–7, during which he made two century breaks. Bingham tied the scores at 9–9 after breaks of 131 and 96, before frame 19 was also won by Bingham on the final black ball. During the frame, Selby was asked to play a shot by the referee after not having acted for three minutes. Bingham also won the next two frames, before the one after was halted twice for a re-rack and won by Selby. Selby won the next frame, but Bingham won the last of the session to lead 13–11. In the fourth session, Selby tied the score by winning the opening two frames, before Bingham won the next to lead 14–13. Selby then won three straight frames to get to one frame away from victory. Bingham won the next frame, but due to the length of the session, the remaining frames were delayed until the culmination of the other semi-final with the scores at 16–15. Returning three hours later, Selby won frame 32 after laying a snooker behind the green ball. This match was more than three and a half hours longer than the other semi-final, in part due to extended safety play and two frames having to be restarted twice.

=== Final ===
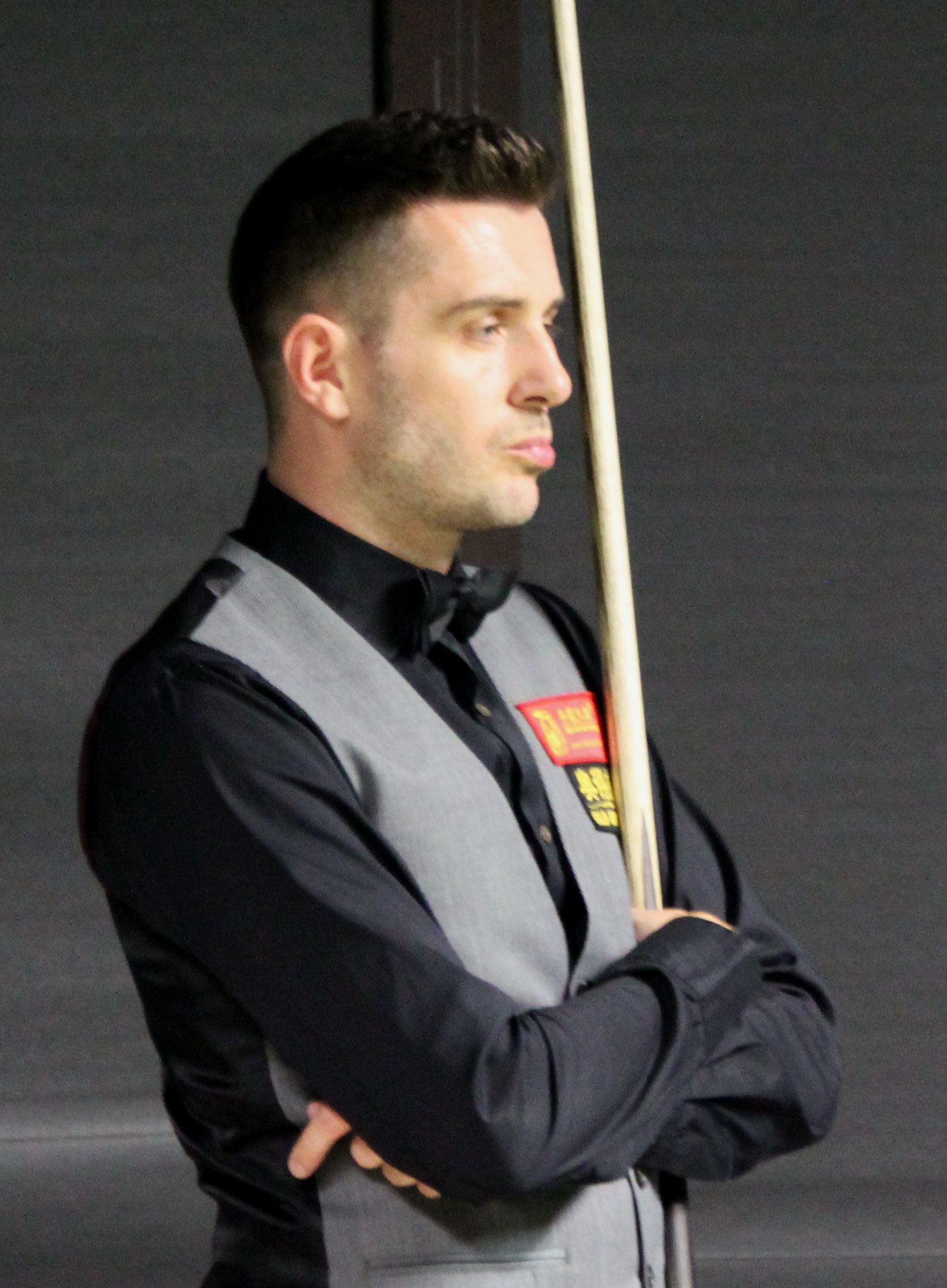
Mark Selby won his fourth world title with an 18–15 victory over Shaun Murphy in the final.

The final was played on 2 and 3 May as the best of 35 frames held over four sessions, between Mark Selby and Shaun Murphy. Both players had won the World Championship previously. Murphy was appearing in his fourth final, having won the title in 2005, and been runner-up in 2009 and 2015; Selby was playing in his fifth final, having won the event in 2014, 2016, and 2017, and been runner-up in 2007. The two players shared the same coach, Chris Henry.

Murphy won the first two frames of the match, but missed a pot in the third frame on a break of 65, allowing Selby to win the frame. Selby compiled a break of 89 in frame four to draw level at 2–2. Murphy took three of the next four frames to lead by two after the first session. Selby then tied the score again at 6–6 by winning three of the first four frames in the second session, despite Murphy not missing a pot in the first three. Selby then won four of the next five frames to end the second session 10–7 ahead, as Murphy failed to pot a ball for an hour.

Murphy won the first frame of the third session with a break of 77, but missed the final black ball in the next, allowing Selby to win frame 19. Murphy won the next frame, but Selby scored the first century break of the final, a 107, in frame 21. Selby won frame 22 to lead by four frames, before Murphy made a break of 100. Murphy also won the next frame, but trailed 11–14 after Selby won the final frame of the third session. Selby won the opening frame of the fourth and final session, before Murphy cleared the table with a break of 43 to cut Selby's lead to 15–12. The two went into the mid-session interval at 16–13 after Selby played a poor safety shot. After a safety battle, Selby won the next frame with a break of 120, and was one frame away from victory at 17–13. Murphy, however, won the next two frames with breaks of 100 and 102. After Murphy missed a pot on a red down the cushion in frame 33, Selby cleared the table to win the match 18–15.

This was Selby's fourth championship, behind only Hendry (with seven), Steve Davis, Ray Reardon, and Ronnie O'Sullivan (each with six) in the modern era, and equal with John Higgins. Davis commented that Selby was the "best all-rounder we have ever seen", and suggested he may win more world championships than Hendry. The final was broadcast to a peak audience of 4.1 million viewers on domestic television, equating to 27 per cent of all viewers in the United Kingdom, compared with the 2.9 million viewers for the 2020 event. The win raised Selby from fourth in the world rankings up to world number two. Murphy, who had celebrated specific shots throughout the event, vowed to use the experience to be more of an entertainer for the coming 2021–22 season. He reflected: "In terms of performance, it turned my year around and ended a poor season on a high note." Selby commented: "To win it once against Ronnie O'Sullivan for the first time was a dream come true – to win it four times is something I could only have dreamed of."

== Main draw ==
The results for the main draw are shown below. Numbers given in brackets are the players' seedings. Match winners are denoted in bold.

**First round** Best of 19 frames
17 April
**Ronnie O'Sullivan** (ENG) (1)	**10**
Mark Joyce (ENG)	4
18 & 19 April
**Anthony McGill** (SCO) (16)	**10**
Ricky Walden (ENG)	5
19 & 20 April
Ding Junhui (CHN) (9)	9
**Stuart Bingham** (ENG)	**10**
17 & 18 April
Stephen Maguire (SCO) (8)	4
**Jamie Jones** (WAL)	**10**
18 & 19 April
**John Higgins** (SCO) (5)	**10**
Tian Pengfei (CHN)	7
21 April
**Mark Williams** (WAL) (12)	**10**
Sam Craigie (ENG)	4
20 April
**Mark Allen** (NIR) (13)	**10**
Lyu Haotian (CHN)	2
21 & 22 April
**Mark Selby** (ENG) (4)	**10**
Kurt Maflin (NOR)	1
17 & 18 April
**Neil Robertson** (AUS) (3)	**10**
Liang Wenbo (CHN)	3
19 & 20 April
**Jack Lisowski** (ENG) (14)	**10**
Ali Carter (ENG)	9
20 & 21 April
**Barry Hawkins** (ENG) (11)	**10**
Matthew Selt (ENG)	3
19 April
**Kyren Wilson** (ENG) (6)	**10**
Gary Wilson (ENG)	8
21 & 22 April
**Shaun Murphy** (ENG) (7)	**10**
Mark Davis (ENG)	7
18 April
**Yan Bingtao** (CHN) (10)	**10**
Martin Gould (ENG)	6
17 & 18 April
**David Gilbert** (ENG) (15)	**10**
Chris Wakelin (ENG)	4
20 & 21 April
**Judd Trump** (ENG) (2)	**10**
Liam Highfield (ENG)	4

**Second round** Best of 25 frames
22 & 23 April
(England) Ronnie O'Sullivan (1)	12
(Scotland) **Anthony McGill** (16)	**13**
25 & 26 April
(England) **Stuart Bingham**	**13**
(Wales) Jamie Jones	6
23 & 24 April
(Scotland) John Higgins (5)	7
(Wales) **Mark Williams** (12)	**13**
24, 25 & 26 April
(Northern Ireland) Mark Allen (13)	7
(England) **Mark Selby** (4)	**13**
22, 23 & 24 April
(Australia) **Neil Robertson** (3)	**13**
(England) Jack Lisowski (14)	9
23 & 24 April
(England) Barry Hawkins (11)	10
(England) **Kyren Wilson** (6)	**13**
24, 25 & 26 April
(England) **Shaun Murphy** (7)	**13**
(China) Yan Bingtao (10)	7
25 & 26 April
(England) David Gilbert (15)	8
(England) **Judd Trump** (2)	**13**

**Quarter-finals**; Best of 25 frames
27 & 28 April
(Scotland) Anthony McGill (16)	12
(England) **Stuart Bingham**	**13**
27 & 28 April
(Wales) Mark Williams (12)	3
(England) **Mark Selby** (4)	**13**
27 & 28 April
(Australia) Neil Robertson (3)	8
(England) **Kyren Wilson** (6)	**13**
27 & 28 April
(England) **Shaun Murphy** (7)	**13**
(England) Judd Trump (2)	11

**Semi-finals**; Best of 33 frames
29, 30 April & 1 May
(England) Stuart Bingham	15
(England) **Mark Selby** (4)	**17**
29, 30 April & 1 May
(England) Kyren Wilson (6)	12
(England) **Shaun Murphy** (7)	**17**

**Final**; Best of 35 frames
2 & 3 May
(England) **Mark Selby** (4)	**18**
(England) Shaun Murphy (7)	15

Final: (Best of 35 frames) Crucible Theatre, Sheffield, 2 & 3 May 2021; Referee: Paul Collier
**Mark Selby (4)**; England				**18**–15			Shaun Murphy (7); England			
Session 1: 3–**5**
Frame	1	2	3	4	5	6	7	8	9	10
Selby	49	46	**68**^{†}	**89**^{†} (89)	0	**66**^{†}	8	54	N/A	N/A
Murphy	**57**^{†}	**67**^{†}	65 (65)	7	**75**^{†} (75)	1	**71**^{†} (64)	**80**^{†} (52)	N/A	N/A
Session 2: **7**–2 (**10**–7)
Frame	1	2	3	4	5	6	7	8	9	10
Selby	**85**^{†} (85)	0	**72**^{†} (67)	**107**^{†} (86)	34	**109**^{†} (57)	**90**^{†} (90)	**88**^{†}	**69**^{†}	N/A
Murphy	49	**98**^{†} (98)	34	0	**97**^{†} (64)	0	34	4	26	N/A
Session 3: 4–4 (**14**–11)
Frame	1	2	3	4	5	6	7	8	9	10
Selby	4	**69**^{†} (62)	41	**134**^{†} (107)	**104**^{†} (54,50)	1	0	**131**^{†} (62,69)	N/A	N/A
Murphy	**84**^{†} (77)	58	**69**^{†}	0	14	**100**^{†} (100)	**108**^{†} (56)	0	N/A	N/A
Session 4: 4–4 (**18**–15)
Frame	1	2	3	4	5	6	7	8	9	10
Selby	**70**^{†} (66)	48	**108**^{†} (68)	11	**120**^{†} (120)	7	8	**71**^{†}	N/A	N/A
Murphy	28	**73**^{†}	0	**79**^{†} (58)	0	**100**^{†} (100)	**126**^{†} (103)	57	N/A	N/A
**120**				Highest break			103			
2				Century breaks			**3**			
**15**				50+ breaks			12			
(England) **Mark Selby** wins the 2021 Betfred World Snooker Championship. † = Winner of frame

== Qualifying ==
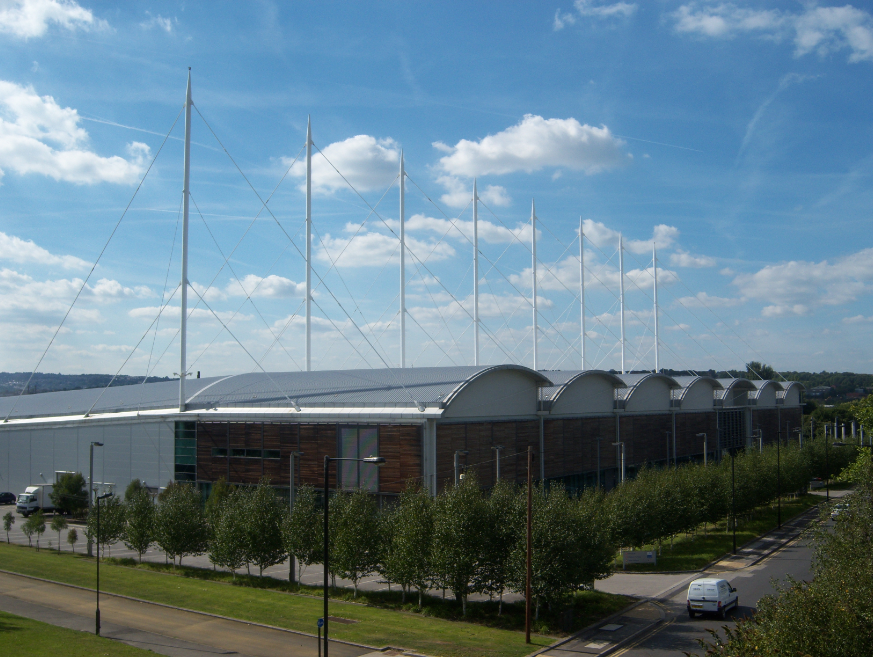
The qualifying rounds were played at the English Institute of Sport in Sheffield.

Qualifying for the main stages of the tournament took place between 5 and 14 April 2021 at the English Institute of Sport in Sheffield. The WPBSA selected 16 amateur players to participate in the qualifying rounds together with the 112 professionals outside the top 16 of the world rankings. The amateur players were selected based on performances in the 2020–21 season, and because of the disruption caused by the COVID-19 pandemic, performances in the 2019–20 season were also included.

Antoni Kowalski and Wu Yize were initially invited, but withdrew and were replaced by Hamim Hussain and Julien Leclercq. Noppon Saengkham, who was scheduled to enter in the third qualifying round, was forced to withdraw after testing positive for COVID-19. Finally, additional amateur players were given places to fill out the remaining places.

=== Qualifying draw ===
The results from qualifying are shown below. Numbers given before players' names show world rankings of the top 112 players, while "a" indicates the amateur players in the draw. The match winners are denoted in bold text.

**Round 1 (Last 144)**; Best of 11 frames
82	Jimmy White (ENG)	3
**Stephen Hendry** (SCO)	**6**
112	Zak Surety (ENG)	4
**Fan Zhengyi** (CHN)	**6**
95	Ken Doherty (IRL)	4
**Lee Walker** (WAL)	**6**
97	**Oliver Lines** (ENG)	**6**
a	Dylan Emery (WAL)	1
104	**Fraser Patrick** (SCO)	**6**
a	Leo Fernandez (IRL)	4
88	Barry Pinches (ENG)	0
**Jamie Wilson** (ENG)	**6**
105	**Gao Yang** (CHN)	**6**
a	Paul Davison (ENG)	3
89	Soheil Vahedi (IRN)	5
a	**Julien Leclercq** (BEL)	**6**
85	**Andy Hicks** (ENG)	**6**
a	Reanne Evans (ENG)	2
108	**Billy Castle** (ENG)	**6**
a	Connor Benzey (ENG)	3
94	**David Lilley** (ENG)	**w/o**
Amine Amiri (MAR)	w/d
100	**Brandon Sargeant** (ENG)	**6**
a	Rebecca Kenna (ENG)	4
101	**Zhao Jianbo** (CHN)	**6**
a	Ross Muir (SCO)	3
93	**Rod Lawler** (ENG)	**6**
Alex Borg (MLT)	1
109	**Fergal O'Brien** (IRL)	**6**
a	Fergal Quinn (NIR)	3
84	**Jamie Clarke** (WAL)	**6**
Iulian Boiko (UKR)	4
83	**Igor Figueiredo** (BRA)	**6**
Farakh Ajaib (PAK)	0
110	**Rory McLeod** (JAM)	**6**
a	Brian Ochoiski (FRA)	5
92	**Ashley Carty** (ENG)	**6**
a	Michael White (WAL)	4
99	**Peter Lines** (ENG)	**6**
a	Mark Lloyd (ENG)	5
102	Allan Taylor (ENG)	4
**Bai Langning** (CHN)	**6**
91	**Duane Jones** (WAL)	**6**
a	Hayden Staniland (ENG)	5
107	**Steven Hallworth** (ENG)	**6**
a	Dean Young (SCO)	2
86	**James Cahill** (ENG)	**6**
Sean Maddocks (ENG)	1
87	**Si Jiahui** (CHN)	**6**
a	Hamim Hussain (ENG)	1
106	Peter Devlin (ENG)	1
**Lukas Kleckers** (GER)	**6**
90	**Kacper Filipiak** (POL)	**6**
Riley Parsons (ENG)	4
103	Aaron Hill (IRL)	4
**Ashley Hugill** (ENG)	**6**
98	**Lei Peifan** (CHN)	**6**
a	Ben Mertens (BEL)	5
96	**Simon Lichtenberg** (GER)	**6**
a	Ivan Kakovskii (RUS)	3
111	Ben Hancorn (ENG)	2
a	**Florian Nüßle** (AUT)	**6**
81	**Mitchell Mann** (ENG)	**6**
a	Robbie McGuigan (NIR)	5

**Round 2 (Last 112)**; Best of 11 frames
80	**Xu Si** (CHN)	**6**
Stephen Hendry (SCO)	1
49	**Liam Highfield** (ENG)	**6**
Fan Zhengyi (CHN)	5
65	**Nigel Bond** (ENG)	**6**
Lee Walker (WAL)	4
64	**Dominic Dale** (WAL)	**6**
97	Oliver Lines (ENG)	4
57	**Joe O'Connor** (ENG)	**6**
104	Fraser Patrick (SCO)	2
72	**Jak Jones** (WAL)	**6**
Jamie Wilson (ENG)	4
56	**Lyu Haotian** (CHN)	**6**
105	Gao Yang (CHN)	5
73	**Chang Bingyu** (CHN)	**6**
a	Julien Leclercq (BEL)	2
76	**Eden Sharav** (ISR)	**6**
85	Andy Hicks (ENG)	1
52	**Tian Pengfei** (CHN)	**6**
108	Billy Castle (ENG)	3
69	**Jamie Jones** (WAL)	**6**
94	David Lilley (ENG)	4
60	**Andrew Higginson** (ENG)	**6**
100	Brandon Sargeant (ENG)	3
61	**Jimmy Robertson** (ENG)	**6**
101	Zhao Jianbo (CHN)	5
68	Yuan Sijun (CHN)	5
93	**Rod Lawler** (ENG)	**6**
54	**Stuart Carrington** (ENG)	**6**
109	Fergal O'Brien (IRL)	2
77	Jamie O'Neill (ENG)	5
84	**Jamie Clarke** (WAL)	**6**
78	Robbie Williams (ENG)	5
83	**Igor Figueiredo** (BRA)	**6**
51	**Anthony Hamilton** (ENG)	**6**
110	Rory McLeod (JAM)	1
67	**Louis Heathcote** (ENG)	**6**
94	Ashley Carty (ENG)	2
62	Luo Honghao (CHN)	3
99	**Peter Lines** (ENG)	**6**
59	Alan McManus (SCO)	3
**Bai Langning** (CHN)	**6**
70	Daniel Wells (WAL)	4
91	**Duane Jones** (WAL)	**6**
53	David Grace (ENG)	3
107	**Steven Hallworth** (ENG)	**6**
75	**Gerard Greene** (NIR)	**6**
86	James Cahill (ENG)	5
74	**Pang Junxu** (CHN)	**6**
87	Si Jiahui (CHN)	4
55	**Alexander Ursenbacher** (SUI)	**6**
Lukas Kleckers (GER)	2
71	Jackson Page (WAL)	5
90	**Kacper Filipiak** (POL)	**6**
58	**Sam Craigie** (ENG)	**6**
Ashley Hugill (ENG)	3
63	**Chris Wakelin** (ENG)	**6**
98	Lei Peifan (CHN)	5
66	**Ian Burns** (ENG)	**6**
96	Simon Lichtenberg (GER)	4
50	**Mark King** (ENG)	**6**
a	Florian Nüßle (AUT)	3
79	**Chen Zifan** (CHN)	**6**
81	Mitchell Mann (ENG)	5

**Round 3 (Last 80)**; Best of 11 frames
17	**Zhou Yuelong** (CHN)	**6**
80	Xu Si (CHN)	5
48	Elliot Slessor (ENG)	5
49	**Liam Highfield** (ENG)	**6**
32	**Matthew Selt** (ENG)	**6**
65	Nigel Bond (ENG)	5
33	**Scott Donaldson** (SCO)	**6**
64	Dominic Dale (WAL)	5
40	**Robert Milkins** (ENG)	**6**
57	Joe O'Connor (ENG)	5
25	**Kurt Maflin** (NOR)	**6**
72	Jak Jones (WAL)	4
41	Noppon Saengkham (THA)	w/d
56	**Lyu Haotian** (CHN)	**w/o**
24	Tom Ford (ENG)	4
73	**Chang Bingyu** (CHN)	**6**
21	**Graeme Dott** (SCO)	**6**
76	Eden Sharav (ISR)	3
44	Sunny Akani (THA)	4
53	**Tian Pengfei** (CHN)	**6**
28	Michael Holt (ENG)	3
69	**Jamie Jones** (WAL)	**6**
37	**Li Hang** (CHN)	**6**
60	Andrew Higginson (ENG)	2
36	**Lu Ning** (CHN)	**6**
61	Jimmy Robertson (ENG)	5
29	**Liang Wenbo** (CHN)	**6**
93	Rod Lawler (ENG)	3
45	**Mark Davis** (ENG)	**6**
52	Stuart Carrington (ENG)	4
20	Joe Perry (ENG)	2
84	**Jamie Clarke** (WAL)	**6**
19	Thepchaiya Un-Nooh (THA)	5
83	**Igor Figueiredo** (BRA)	**6**
46	**Mark Joyce** (ENG)	**6**
51	Anthony Hamilton (ENG)	3
30	**Ryan Day** (WAL)	**6**
67	Louis Heathcote (ENG)	5
35	**Ricky Walden** (ENG)	**6**
99	Peter Lines (ENG)	1
38	Ben Woollaston (ENG)	5
**Bai Langning** (CHN)	**6**
27	**Martin Gould** (ENG)	**6**
91	Duane Jones (WAL)	4
43	Jordan Brown (NIR)	5
107	**Steven Hallworth** (ENG)	**6**
22	**Gary Wilson** (ENG)	**6**
75	Gerard Greene (NIR)	4
23	**Ali Carter** (ENG)	**6**
74	Pang Junxu (CHN)	4
42	Martin O'Donnell (ENG)	5
55	**Alexander Ursenbacher** (SUI)	**6**
26	**Zhao Xintong** (CHN)	**6**
90	Kacper Filipiak (POL)	3
39	Hossein Vafaei (IRN)	0
58	**Sam Craigie** (ENG)	**6**
34	Matthew Stevens (WAL)	3
63	**Chris Wakelin** (ENG)	**6**
31	**Xiao Guodong** (CHN)	**6**
66	Ian Burns (ENG)	1
47	**Luca Brecel** (BEL)	**6**
50	Mark King (ENG)	3
18	**Stuart Bingham** (ENG)	**6**
79	Chen Zifan (CHN)	1

**Round 4 (Last 48)**; Best of 19 frames
17	(China) Zhou Yuelong	7
49	(England) **Liam Highfield**	**10**
32	(England) **Matthew Selt**	**10**
33	(Scotland) Scott Donaldson	3
40	(England) Robert Milkins	4
25	(Norway) **Kurt Maflin**	**10**
56	(China) **Lyu Haotian**	**10**
73	(China) Chang Bingyu	6
21	(Scotland) Graeme Dott	7
53	(China) **Tian Pengfei**	**10**
69	(Wales) **Jamie Jones**	**10**
37	(China) Li Hang	5
36	(China) Lu Ning	7
29	(China) **Liang Wenbo**	**10**
45	(England) **Mark Davis**	**10**
84	(Wales) Jamie Clarke	8
83	(Brazil) Igor Figueiredo	7
46	(England) **Mark Joyce**	**10**
30	(Wales) Ryan Day	5
35	(England) **Ricky Walden**	**10**
(China) Bai Langning	5
27	(England) **Martin Gould**	**10**
107	(England) Steven Hallworth	3
22	(England) **Gary Wilson**	**10**
23	(England) **Ali Carter**	**10**
55	(Switzerland) Alexander Ursenbacher	4
26	(China) Zhao Xintong	9
58	(England) **Sam Craigie**	**10**
63	(England) **Chris Wakelin**	**10**
31	(China) Xiao Guodong	7
47	(Belgium) Luca Brecel	5
18	(England) **Stuart Bingham**	**10**

== Century breaks ==
=== Main stage centuries ===
A record number of century breaks, 108, was made during the main event. There were 22 players that made at least one century break. The highest break was a 144 made by Shaun Murphy in his second-round match against Yan Bingtao.

- 144, 131, 124, 120, 117, 113, 109, 104, 103, 100, 100 – Shaun Murphy
- 142, 135, 134, 134, 134, 132, 132, 125, 121, 120, 107, 101 – Mark Selby
- 139, 133, 131, 127, 121, 119, 115, 110, 107, 102 – Kyren Wilson
- 139, 116, 102 – Mark Allen
- 138, 137, 124, 112, 105 – Ronnie O'Sullivan
- 138 – Liam Highfield
- 137, 135, 126, 126, 113, 110, 108, 105, 100, 100 – Neil Robertson
- 137, 126, 123, 107 – Barry Hawkins
- 136, 130, 130, 126, 126, 119, 106, 105 – Anthony McGill
- 135, 127, 113, 107 – John Higgins
- 132, 111, 100 – David Gilbert
- 131, 131, 129, 127, 125, 122, 120, 119, 117, 108, 104, 102, 100 – Stuart Bingham
- 130, 116, 101, 100 – Yan Bingtao
- 126 – Liang Wenbo
- 121, 116 – Jack Lisowski
- 121 – Jamie Jones
- 116, 114, 111, 111, 107, 105, 105 – Judd Trump
- 112, 105 – Ricky Walden
- 111, 108, 102, 101 – Mark Williams
- 111 – Tian Pengfei
- 109 – Martin Gould
- 105 – Ding Junhui

=== Qualifying stage centuries ===
A total of 106 century breaks were made during the qualifying rounds. The highest was a 143 made by Mark Davis in his third-round match against Stuart Carrington.

- 143 – Mark Davis
- 142, 137, 135, 110, 110, 106 – Matthew Selt
- 140, 140, 120, 108 – Stuart Bingham
- 140 – Fergal O'Brien
- 139 – Ali Carter
- 139 – Alexander Ursenbacher
- 138, 131 – Li Hang
- 138 – Lei Peifan
- 137, 134, 125, 122 – Oliver Lines
- 137, 114, 114, 104 – Joe O'Connor
- 137, 112, 103 – Duane Jones
- 136, 113, 102 – Bai Langning
- 136 – Gerard Greene
- 135, 125, 111, 110, 100 – Chang Bingyu
- 135 – Mark Joyce
- 134, 134 – Lukas Kleckers
- 133, 120 – Xiao Guodong
- 133, 105, 104 – Igor Figueiredo
- 132 – Liam Highfield
- 132 – Michael Holt
- 131, 114, 100 – Lyu Haotian
- 131, 108 – Gary Wilson
- 130, 123 – Jak Jones
- 130, 106 – Liang Wenbo
- 130 – Lu Ning
- 126, 120, 107, 100 – Chris Wakelin
- 126, 117, 106 – Sam Craigie
- 125 – Robbie Williams
- 124, 116, 100 – Stuart Carrington
- 124, 104 – Dominic Dale
- 123, 113, 104 – Zhao Jianbo
- 122 – Nigel Bond
- 122 – Si Jiahui
- 121, 114, 110, 108 – Tian Pengfei
- 120, 111 – Mark King
- 119, 106, 104 – Kurt Maflin
- 117, 103, 101, 100, 100 – Jamie Jones
- 114 – Julien Leclercq
- 114 – Michael White
- 110 – Chen Zifan
- 109 – Ricky Walden
- 108, 103 – Fraser Patrick
- 108 – Dylan Emery
- 106 – Pang Junxu
- 105 – Ashley Hugill
- 105 – Yuan Sijun
- 104, 100 – Louis Heathcote
- 103, 102 – Steven Hallworth
- 103, 100 – Martin Gould
- 103 – Elliot Slessor
