= Asian Tour 2013/2014 – Event 4 =

Asian Tour 2013/2014 Event 4
Tournament information
- Dates: 4–8 March 2014
- Venue: Dongguan Dongcheng Sports Garden
- City: Dongguan
- Country: China
- Organisation: World Snooker
- Format: Minor-ranking event
- Total prize fund: £50,000
- Winner's share: £10,000
- Highest break: Liang Wenbo (CHN) (143)

Final
- Champion: Stuart Bingham (ENG)
- Runner-up: Liang Wenbo (CHN)
- Score: 4–1

The Asian Tour 2013/2014 – Event 4 (also known as the 2014 Dongguan Open) was a professional minor-ranking snooker tournament that took place between 4–8 March 2014 at the Dongguan Dongcheng Sports Garden in Dongguan, China.

Stuart Bingham won his ninth professional title by defeating Liang Wenbo 4–1 in the final.

== Prize fund and ranking points ==
The breakdown of prize money and ranking points of the event is shown below:

	Prize fund	Ranking points^{1}
Winner	£10,000	2,000
Runner-up	£5,000	1,600
Semi-finalist	£2,500	1,280
Quarter-finalist	£1,500	1,000
Last 16	£1,000	760
Last 32	£600	560
Last 64	£200	360
Total	£50,000	–

- ^{1} Only professional players can earn ranking points.

== Main draw ==
=== Top half ===
==== Section 1 ====
Last 128; Best of 7 frames
(China) Pan Weixing	3
(China) Cheng Sihong	4
(China) Fang Xiongman	4
(China) Song Yang	3
(China) Li Yan	2
(China) Xu Si	4
(China) Huang Jiahao	4
(Hong Kong) Chan Ka Kin	1
(China) Ding Junhui	4
(China) Wang Qianwei	2
(Scotland) Graeme Dott	4
(England) Craig Steadman	1
(China) Li Hang	4
(Hong Kong) Ng Yam Shui	1

Last 64; Best of 7 frames
(China) Liang Wenbo	4
(China) Cheng Sihong	0
(China) Fang Xiongman	4
(China) Xu Si	0
(China) Huang Jiahao	2
(China) Ding Junhui	4
(Scotland) Graeme Dott	3
(China) Li Hang	4

Last 32; Best of 7 frames
(China) Liang Wenbo	4
(China) Fang Xiongman	0
(China) Ding Junhui	4
(China) Li Hang	0

Last 16; Best of 7 frames
(China) Liang Wenbo	4
(China) Ding Junhui	3

==== Section 2 ====
Last 128; Best of 7 frames
(Hong Kong) Au Chi-wai	4
(Australia) Timothy Ng	1
(China) Zhou Yuelong	4
(China) Li Ningning	1
(China) Ma Bing	4
(China) Xiong Jun	0
(China) Zou Junhai	2
(China) He Guoqiang	4
(China) Wang Zepeng	4
(China) Zhang Hanxuan	0
(China) Cao Xinlong	3
(China) Maihe Muti	4
(Thailand) Dechawat Poomjaeng	4
(China) Fan Zhengyi	2
(China) Wang Yuchen	1
(China) Ji Zhijun	4

Last 64; Best of 7 frames
(Hong Kong) Au Chi-wai	4
(China) Zhou Yuelong	2
(China) Ma Bing	4
(China) He Guoqiang	0
(China) Wang Zepeng	4
(China) Maihe Muti	0
(Thailand) Dechawat Poomjaeng	4
(China) Ji Zhijun	0

Last 32; Best of 7 frames
(Hong Kong) Au Chi-wai	4
(China) Ma Bing	3
(China) Wang Zepeng	2
(Thailand) Dechawat Poomjaeng	4

Last 16; Best of 7 frames
(Hong Kong) Au Chi-wai	1
(Thailand) Dechawat Poomjaeng	4

==== Section 3 ====
Last 128; Best of 7 frames
(China) Hu Hao	2
(England) Mark Davis	4
(England) Ben Woollaston	4
(China) Chen Junhao	1
(China) Zhao Xintong	4
(China) Zhang Yi	3
(China) Yu Delu	4
(Hong Kong) Chang Yu Kiu	0
(China) Li Yuan	4
(Hong Kong) Lin Tang Ho	3
(China) Lu Ning	1
(Republic of Ireland) Ken Doherty	4
(China) Luo Honghao	3
(China) Pang Junxu	4
(China) Shan Xianshu	2
(China) Ding Wei	4

Last 64; Best of 7 frames
(England) Mark Davis	2
(England) Ben Woollaston	4
(China) Zhao Xintong	3
(China) Yu Delu	4
(China) Li Yuan	0
(Republic of Ireland) Ken Doherty	4
(China) Pang Junxu	4
(China) Ding Wei	0

Last 32; Best of 7 frames
(England) Ben Woollaston	3
(China) Yu Delu	4
(Republic of Ireland) Ken Doherty	4
(China) Pang Junxu	1

Last 16; Best of 7 frames
(China) Yu Delu	4
(Republic of Ireland) Ken Doherty	3

==== Section 4 ====
Last 128; Best of 7 frames
(Wales) Daniel Wells	0
(England) Tom Ford	4
(China) Yan Bingtao	4
(China) Chen Bo	0
(China) Guan Zhen	4
(China) Liu Jiaming	3
(England) Barry Pinches	4
(Hong Kong) Man Ming Wa	1
(England) Paul Davison	4
(China) Chen Yelong	0
(Scotland) Alan McManus	4
(Scotland) Michael Leslie	2
(England) Michael Holt	2
(China) Cao Kaisheng	4
(Scotland) Anthony McGill	3
(Norway) Kurt Maflin	4

Last 64; Best of 7 frames
(England) Tom Ford	4
(China) Yan Bingtao	3
(China) Guan Zhen	1
(England) Barry Pinches	4
(England) Paul Davison	1
(Scotland) Alan McManus	4
(China) Cao Kaisheng	1
(Norway) Kurt Maflin	4

Last 32; Best of 7 frames
(England) Tom Ford	4
(England) Barry Pinches	2
(Scotland) Alan McManus	4
(Norway) Kurt Maflin	1

Last 16; Best of 7 frames
(England) Tom Ford	4
(Scotland) Alan McManus	3

=== Bottom half ===
==== Section 5 ====
Last 128; Best of 7 frames
(China) Niu Zhuang	4
(China) Yang Gangxinfu	2
(China) Zhong Lin	4
(China) Wang Qixing	0
(China) Mei Xiwen	0
(China) Zhang Yadong	4
(Scotland) Ross Muir	4
(China) Long Yun	1
(England) Alex Davies	4
(China) Feng Zeyuan	1
(England) Gary Wilson	4
(China) Huang Hooyong	0
(China) Lu Chenwei	4
(England) James Cahill	2

Last 64; Best of 7 frames
(China) Lyu Haotian	4
(China) Niu Zhuang	2
(China) Zhong Lin	4
(China) Zhang Yadong	1
(Scotland) Ross Muir	2
(England) Alex Davies	4
(England) Gary Wilson	4
(China) Lu Chenwei	1

Last 32; Best of 7 frames
(China) Lyu Haotian	2
(China) Zhong Lin	4
(England) Alex Davies	3
(England) Gary Wilson	4

Last 16; Best of 7 frames
(China) Zhong Lin	2
(England) Gary Wilson	4

==== Section 6 ====
Last 128; Best of 7 frames
(China) Zhang Yong	0
(China) Sun Peng	4
(China) Pa Ruke	3
(China) Sun Hongrui	4
(China) Chen Zifan	4
(China) Luo Guangsheng	1
(China) Da Hailin	w/d
(China) Ma Yinzhu	w/o
(China) Chen Wen	2
(China) Qiu Yalong	4
(China) Cai Jianzhong	4
(China) Yao Pengcheng	2
(China) Chen Zhe	4
(England) Mark Joyce	2
(China) Rouzi Maimaiti	4
(China) Gao Le	2

Last 64; Best of 7 frames
(China) Sun Peng	4
(China) Sun Hongrui	3
(China) Chen Zifan	4
(China) Ma Yinzhu	1
(China) Qiu Yalong	2
(China) Cai Jianzhong	4
(China) Chen Zhe	3
(China) Rouzi Maimaiti	4

Last 32; Best of 7 frames
(China) Sun Peng	4
(China) Chen Zifan	3
(China) Cai Jianzhong	4
(China) Rouzi Maimaiti	3

Last 16; Best of 7 frames
(China) Sun Peng	2
(China) Cai Jianzhong	4

==== Section 7 ====
Last 128; Best of 7 frames
(Scotland) Scott Donaldson	4
(China) Yuan Sijun	1
(China) Feng Yu	4
(China) Li Yujin	2
(China) Chen Ruifu	4
(Hong Kong) Ng On Yee	1
(England) Stuart Bingham	4
(China) Li Yingdong	0
(China) Lin Shuai	4
(China) Yu Xuantang	0
(China) Xu Xinjian	0
(England) Jimmy White	4
(China) Zhang Anda	4
(China) Zhang Zihao	1
(China) Chen Feilong	4
(China) Lei Zhen	2

Last 64; Best of 7 frames
(Scotland) Scott Donaldson	4
(China) Feng Yu	1
(China) Chen Ruifu	0
(England) Stuart Bingham	4
(China) Lin Shuai	4
(England) Jimmy White	1
(China) Zhang Anda	1
(China) Chen Feilong	4

Last 32; Best of 7 frames
(Scotland) Scott Donaldson	1
(England) Stuart Bingham	4
(China) Lin Shuai	4
(China) Chen Feilong	1

Last 16; Best of 7 frames
(England) Stuart Bingham	4
(China) Lin Shuai	0

==== Section 8 ====
Last 128; Best of 7 frames
(England) Robert Milkins	4
(China) Yang Haifeng	0
(England) Jack Lisowski	4
(China) Li Jianbing	2
(China) Lin Yongzhi	4
(China) Wu Fan	1
(China) Jin Long	4
(China) Long Zehuang	1
(China) Tang Jun	4
(China) Ma Tingpeng	2
(China) Tian Pengfei	4
(Hong Kong) Chan Mingtung	1
(China) Zhu Yinghui	n/s
(Thailand) Thanawat Thirapongpaiboon	w/o

Last 64; Best of 7 frames
(England) Robert Milkins	3
(England) Jack Lisowski	4
(China) Lin Yongzhi	2
(China) Jin Long	4
(China) Tang Jun	0
(China) Tian Pengfei	4
(Thailand) Thanawat Thirapongpaiboon	0
(China) Ju Reti	4

Last 32; Best of 7 frames
(England) Jack Lisowski	4
(China) Jin Long	2
(China) Tian Pengfei	3
(China) Ju Reti	4

Last 16; Best of 7 frames
(England) Jack Lisowski	4
(China) Ju Reti	2

=== Finals ===
Quarter-finals; Best of 7 frames		Semi-finals; Best of 7 frames		Final; Best of 7 frames
(China) Liang Wenbo	4
(Thailand) Dechawat Poomjaeng	2	(China) Liang Wenbo	4
(China) Yu Delu	4	(China) Yu Delu	2
(England) Tom Ford	2			(China) Liang Wenbo	1
(England) Gary Wilson	1			(England) Stuart Bingham	4
(China) Cai Jianzhong	4	(China) Cai Jianzhong	2
(England) Stuart Bingham	4	(England) Stuart Bingham	4
(England) Jack Lisowski	2

== Century breaks ==
- 143, 113, 111 – Liang Wenbo
- 137, 111, 103, 101 – Ding Junhui
- 136, 123, 105, 103 – Yu Delu
- 136 – Michael Leslie
- 133, 103 – Alan McManus
- 131 – Zhou Yuelong
- 127, 126 – Ken Doherty
- 127 – Jimmy White
- 125 – Gary Wilson
- 124, 116 – Barry Pinches
- 112 – Robert Milkins
- 105, 100 – Stuart Bingham
- 104 – Rouzi Maimaiti
- 102 – Feng Yu
