= Asian Tour 2013/2014 – Event 1 =

Asian Tour 2013/2014 Event 1

Tournament information
- Dates: 11–15 June 2013
- Venue: Yixing Sports Centre
- City: Yixing
- Country: China
- Organisation: World Snooker
- Format: Minor-ranking event
- Total prize fund: £50,000
- Winner's share: £10,000
- Highest break: Michael White (WAL) (141)

Final
- Champion: Joe Perry (ENG)
- Runner-up: Mark Selby (ENG)
- Score: 4–1

The Asian Tour 2013/2014 – Event 1 (also known as the 2013 Yixing Open) was a professional minor-ranking snooker tournament that took place between 11 and 15 June 2013 at the Yixing Sports Centre in Yixing, China.

Joe Perry won his first title carrying ranking points by defeating Mark Selby 4–1 in the final. This was Perry's first professional title since the 2008 Championship League.

== Prize fund and ranking points ==
The breakdown of prize money and ranking points of the event is shown below:

	Prize fund	Ranking points^{1}
Winner	£10,000	2,000
Runner-up	£5,000	1,600
Semi-finalist	£2,500	1,280
Quarter-finalist	£1,500	1,000
Last 16	£1,000	760
Last 32	£600	560
Last 64	£200	360
Total	£50,000	–

- ^{1} Only professional players can earn ranking points.

== Main draw ==
=== Preliminary round ===
Best of 7 frames

(China) Li Haibin	2–4	(China) Zhu Yinghui
(China) Liu Yijun	1–4	(China) Liu Ren
(China) Zhao Hanyang	2–4	(China) Yuan Sijun
(China) Zhang Dongtao	w/d–w/o	(China) Wang Shi
(China) Lei Zhen	4–1	(China) Zhang Wei
(China) Liu Jiaming	2–4	(China) Cai Jianzhong

(China) Cui Ming	4–0	(China) Li Zhen
(China) Yu Yongsheng	2–4	(China) Zhang Yang
(China) Zhang Zihao	4–3	(China) Cheng Feng
(China) Xiong Jun	2–4	(China) Luo Honghao
(China) Sun Peng	1–4	(China) Guan Zhen

=== Main rounds ===
==== Top half ====
===== Section 1 =====
Last 128; Best of 7 frames
(England) Mark Selby	4
(China) Ye Shaojun	0
(China) Li Yuan	4
(China) Zhu Yinghui	2
(England) Craig Steadman	2
(China) Wang Heng	4
(England) Nigel Bond	4
(China) Niu Zhuang	2
(Norway) Kurt Maflin	4
(China) Liu Ren	0
(China) Ma Bing	4
(China) Lin Shuai	0
(Brazil) Igor Figueiredo	w/d
(China) Zhong Lin	w/o
(England) Matthew Selt	4
(China) Yuan Sijun	0

Last 64; Best of 7 frames
(England) Mark Selby	4
(China) Li Yuan	0
(China) Wang Heng	2
(England) Nigel Bond	4
(Norway) Kurt Maflin	2
(China) Ma Bing	4
(China) Zhong Lin	0
(England) Matthew Selt	4

Last 32; Best of 7 frames
(England) Mark Selby	4
(England) Nigel Bond	0
(China) Ma Bing	0
(England) Matthew Selt	4

Last 16; Best of 7 frames
(England) Mark Selby	4
(England) Matthew Selt	3

===== Section 2 =====
Last 128; Best of 7 frames
(China) Xiao Guodong	4
(China) Pu Jingsong	2
(England) Michael Wasley	4
(England) Reanne Evans	1
(Wales) Daniel Wells	4
(China) Yang Gangxinfu	2
(China) Li Yan	3
(China) Fang Fan	4
(Wales) Mark Williams	1
(China) Ju Reti	4
(England) Mike Dunn	4
(China) Wang Shi	0
(China) Liu Chuang	4
(China) Lu Chenwei	3
(China) Jin Long	4
(China) Lei Zhen	2

Last 64; Best of 7 frames
(China) Xiao Guodong	4
(England) Michael Wasley	1
(Wales) Daniel Wells	4
(China) Fang Fan	1
(China) Ju Reti	4
(England) Mike Dunn	3
(China) Liu Chuang	4
(China) Jin Long	2

Last 32; Best of 7 frames
(China) Xiao Guodong	4
(Wales) Daniel Wells	0
(China) Ju Reti	1
(China) Liu Chuang	4

Last 16; Best of 7 frames
(China) Xiao Guodong	1
(China) Liu Chuang	4

===== Section 3 =====
Last 128; Best of 7 frames
(Iran) Hossein Vafaei	w/d
(China) Hu Hao	w/o
(Scotland) Jamie Burnett	4
(China) Huang Hooyong	2
(China) Chen Ruifu	3
(China) Cai Jianzhong	4
(Scotland) Scott Donaldson	4
(China) Lu Ning	2
(China) Chen Zhe	2
(China) Zhang Yadong	4
(England) Mark King	3
(China) Mei Xiwen	4
(England) Michael Holt	w/d
(China) Chen Zifan	w/o
(Wales) Andrew Pagett	4
(China) Jiang Yuanlong	0

Last 64; Best of 7 frames
(China) Hu Hao	3
(Scotland) Jamie Burnett	4
(China) Cai Jianzhong	0
(Scotland) Scott Donaldson	4
(China) Zhang Yadong	2
(China) Mei Xiwen	4
(China) Chen Zifan	0
(Wales) Andrew Pagett	4

Last 32; Best of 7 frames
(Scotland) Jamie Burnett	3
(Scotland) Scott Donaldson	4
(China) Mei Xiwen	2
(Wales) Andrew Pagett	4

Last 16; Best of 7 frames
(Scotland) Scott Donaldson	4
(Wales) Andrew Pagett	2

===== Section 4 =====
Last 128; Best of 7 frames
(Northern Ireland) Gerard Greene	4
(China) Han Fei	0
(England) Peter Lines	4
(China) Li Wei	1
(China) Cao Xinlong	4
(China) Shan Xianshu	1
(Thailand) Dechawat Poomjaeng	4
(China) Cui Ming	3
(China) Chen Feilong	4
(China) Chen Bo	0
(China) Tian Pengfei	4
(China) Zhong Weihao	0
(England) Alfie Burden	3
(China) Yang Qingtian	4
(Scotland) Graeme Dott	4
(China) Zhou Yuelong	2

Last 64; Best of 7 frames
(Northern Ireland) Gerard Greene	4
(England) Peter Lines	0
(China) Cao Xinlong	0
(Thailand) Dechawat Poomjaeng	4
(China) Chen Feilong	2
(China) Tian Pengfei	4
(China) Yang Qingtian	4
(Scotland) Graeme Dott	2

Last 32; Best of 7 frames
(Northern Ireland) Gerard Greene	2
(Thailand) Dechawat Poomjaeng	4
(China) Tian Pengfei	4
(China) Yang Qingtian	2

Last 16; Best of 7 frames
(Thailand) Dechawat Poomjaeng	0
(China) Tian Pengfei	4

==== Bottom half ====
===== Section 5 =====
Last 128; Best of 7 frames
(England) Paul Davison	w/o
(China) Liu Ying	w/d
(Scotland) John Higgins	w/o
(China) Qi Ya	w/d
(England) Gary Wilson	4
(China) Ma Tingpeng	0
(England) Robert Milkins	4
(China) Ma Yinzhu	1
(Thailand) James Wattana	4
(China) Zhang Yong	1
(China) Li Hang	4
(China) Wang Yuchen	0
(England) Joe Perry	4
(China) Ma Jianjun	0
(China) Lin Yongzhi	2
(China) Pan Weixing	4

Last 64; Best of 7 frames
(England) Paul Davison	1
(Scotland) John Higgins	4
(England) Gary Wilson	3
(England) Robert Milkins	4
(Thailand) James Wattana	4
(China) Li Hang	2
(England) Joe Perry	4
(China) Pan Weixing	0

Last 32; Best of 7 frames
(Scotland) John Higgins	2
(England) Robert Milkins	4
(Thailand) James Wattana	0
(England) Joe Perry	4

Last 16; Best of 7 frames
(England) Robert Milkins	2
(England) Joe Perry	4

===== Section 6 =====
Last 128; Best of 7 frames
(England) Jack Lisowski	4
(China) Sun Jianjun	1
(China) Rouzi Maimaiti	1
(China) Fang Xiongman	4
(Wales) Ryan Day	4
(China) Pa Ruke	2
(England) Rory McLeod	4
(China) Liao Songtao	1
(China) Cao Yupeng	4
(China) Zhang Yang	0
(Hong Kong) Marco Fu	4
(China) Li Jianbing	0
(England) Jimmy White	4
(China) Cui Bo	0
(England) Ben Woollaston	4
(China) Xu Xinjian	2

Last 64; Best of 7 frames
(England) Jack Lisowski	4
(China) Fang Xiongman	2
(Wales) Ryan Day	4
(England) Rory McLeod	1
(China) Cao Yupeng	4
(Hong Kong) Marco Fu	3
(England) Jimmy White	1
(England) Ben Woollaston	4

Last 32; Best of 7 frames
(England) Jack Lisowski	4
(Wales) Ryan Day	3
(China) Cao Yupeng	4
(England) Ben Woollaston	0

Last 16; Best of 7 frames
(England) Jack Lisowski	3
(China) Cao Yupeng	4

===== Section 7 =====
Last 128; Best of 7 frames
(China) Zhang Anda	4
(China) Zhang Hanxuan	0
(Wales) Dominic Dale	4
(China) Maihe Muti	1
(England) Alex Davies	4
(China) Zhang Zihao	1
(Wales) Jamie Jones	4
(China) Luo Honghao	2
(China) Lyu Haotian	3
(China) Guan Zhen	4
(China) Tang Jun	4
(China) Li Yujin	0
(China) Liang Wenbo	4
(China) Li Yunhao	0
(China) Yu Delu	4
(China) Huang Jiahao	0

Last 64; Best of 7 frames
(China) Zhang Anda	2
(Wales) Dominic Dale	4
(England) Alex Davies	4
(Wales) Jamie Jones	0
(China) Guan Zhen	4
(China) Tang Jun	1
(China) Liang Wenbo	1
(China) Yu Delu	4

Last 32; Best of 7 frames
(Wales) Dominic Dale	3
(England) Alex Davies	4
(China) Guan Zhen	2
(China) Yu Delu	4

Last 16; Best of 7 frames
(England) Alex Davies	1
(China) Yu Delu	4

===== Section 8 =====
Last 128; Best of 7 frames
(England) Jimmy Robertson	4
(China) Pang Junxu	2
(China) Wang Linhan	3
(China) Da Hailin	4
(Scotland) Alan McManus	4
(China) Wang Zepeng	0
(Wales) Michael White	4
(China) Zhao Xintong	3
(China) Shi Hanqing	w/o
(China) An Dongchi	w/d
(England) Liam Highfield	4
(China) Feng Zeyuan	2
(Australia) Vinnie Calabrese	2
(China) Yan Bingtao	4
(China) Ding Junhui	4
(China) Long Zehuang	0

Last 64; Best of 7 frames
(England) Jimmy Robertson	3
(China) Da Hailin	4
(Scotland) Alan McManus	4
(Wales) Michael White	1
(China) Shi Hanqing	2
(England) Liam Highfield	4
(China) Yan Bingtao	1
(China) Ding Junhui	4

Last 32; Best of 7 frames
(China) Da Hailin	1
(Scotland) Alan McManus	4
(England) Liam Highfield	3
(China) Ding Junhui	4

Last 16; Best of 7 frames
(Scotland) Alan McManus	4
(China) Ding Junhui	2

==== Finals ====
Quarter-finals; Best of 7 frames		Semi-finals; Best of 7 frames		Final; Best of 7 frames
(England) Mark Selby	4
(China) Liu Chuang	0	(England) Mark Selby	4
(Scotland) Scott Donaldson	4	(Scotland) Scott Donaldson	0
(China) Tian Pengfei	3			(England) Mark Selby	1
(England) Joe Perry	4			(England) Joe Perry	4
(China) Cao Yupeng	3	(England) Joe Perry	4
(China) Yu Delu	1	(Scotland) Alan McManus	2
(Scotland) Alan McManus	4

== Century breaks ==
- 141 – Michael White
- 137, 120 – Mark Selby
- 127 – Jack Lisowski
- 125 – Jin Long
- 125 – Jimmy White
- 121, 105 – Ding Junhui
- 120 – Cui Ming
- 120 – Li Hang
- 118 – Alfie Burden
- 117, 100 – Liu Chuang
- 117 – Yu Delu
- 116 – John Higgins
- 116 – Zhang Anda
- 116 – Mei Xiwen
- 113 – Ju Reti
- 113 – Jimmy Robertson
- 109 – Zhang Yang
- 109 – Gerard Greene
- 105 – Dominic Dale
- 103 – Cao Xinlong
- 102 – Robert Milkins
- 101, 100 – Guan Zhen
