= Asian Tour 2013/2014 – Event 2 =

Asian Tour 2013/2014 Event 2
Tournament information
- Dates: 23–27 September 2013
- Venue: Zhangjiagang Sports Center
- City: Zhangjiagang
- Country: China
- Organisation: World Snooker
- Format: Minor-ranking event
- Total prize fund: £50,000
- Winner's share: £10,000
- Highest break: Ju Reti (CHN) (142)

Final
- Champion: Ju Reti (CHN)
- Runner-up: Michael Holt (ENG)
- Score: 4–1

The Asian Tour 2013/2014 – Event 2 (also known as the 2013 Zhangjiagang Open) was a professional minor-ranking snooker tournament that took place between 23 and 27 September 2013 at the Zhangjiagang Sports Center in Zhangjiagang, China.

Ju Reti won his first professional title by defeating Michael Holt 4–1 in the final. Ju became the first amateur player to win a Players Tour Championship title.

== Prize fund and ranking points ==
The breakdown of prize money and ranking points of the event is shown below:

	Prize fund	Ranking points^{1}
Winner	£10,000	2,000
Runner-up	£5,000	1,600
Semi-finalist	£2,500	1,280
Quarter-finalist	£1,500	1,000
Last 16	£1,000	760
Last 32	£600	560
Last 64	£200	360
Total	£50,000	–

- ^{1} Only professional players can earn ranking points.

== Main draw ==
=== Top half ===
==== Section 1 ====
Last 128; Best of 7 frames
(China) Zhang Yadong	2
(China) Wang Yuchen	4
(China) Ma Tingpeng	w/o
(China) Chen Zhihui	w/d
(China) Zhou Yuelong	4
(Hong Kong) Leong Man Hoi	0
(China) Chen Feilong	4
(China) Feng Zeyuan	1
(China) Wang Heng	4
(China) Li Jianbing	2
(China) Guan Zhen	4
(China) Li Haibin	0

Last 64; Best of 7 frames
(Scotland) Scott Donaldson	4
(England) Matthew Selt	2
(China) Wang Yuchen	1
(China) Ma Tingpeng	4
(China) Zhou Yuelong	4
(China) Chen Feilong	2
(China) Wang Heng	1
(China) Guan Zhen	4

Last 32; Best of 7 frames
(Scotland) Scott Donaldson	3
(China) Ma Tingpeng	4
(China) Zhou Yuelong	4
(China) Guan Zhen	3

Last 16; Best of 7 frames
(China) Ma Tingpeng	0
(China) Zhou Yuelong	4

==== Section 2 ====
Last 128; Best of 7 frames
(England) David Grace	4
(China) Chen Junhao	1
(England) Ben Woollaston	4
(China) Li Junchen	0
(China) Lin Yongzhi	4
(China) Luo Guangsheng	1
(England) Michael Holt	4
(China) Niu Zhuang	1
(China) Cai Jianzhong	4
(China) Zhou Xiao	0
(China) Lyu Haotian	w/d
(China) Luo Honghao	w/o
(Wales) Matthew Stevens	w/d
(Hong Kong) Lin Tang Ho Alan	w/o

Last 64; Best of 7 frames
(China) Yang Qingtian	3
(England) David Grace	4
(England) Ben Woollaston	4
(China) Lin Yongzhi	0
(England) Michael Holt	4
(China) Cai Jianzhong	0
(China) Luo Honghao	4
(Hong Kong) Lin Tang Ho Alan	1

Last 32; Best of 7 frames
(England) David Grace	4
(England) Ben Woollaston	3
(England) Michael Holt	4
(China) Luo Honghao	2

Last 16; Best of 7 frames
(England) David Grace	1
(England) Michael Holt	4

==== Section 3 ====
Last 128; Best of 7 frames
(China) Mei Xiwen	4
(China) Ma Yinzhu	2
(England) Peter Lines	4
(China) Yang Gangxinfu	2
(England) Mark Joyce	4
(China) Wang Shi	0
(England) Paul Davison	4
(China) Zhang Zihao	1
(China) Rouzi Maimaiti	4
(China) Pa Ruke	3
(China) Zhang Anda	4
(China) Li Yujin	1

Last 64; Best of 7 frames
(China) Mei Xiwen	4
(England) Peter Lines	3
(England) Mark Joyce	1
(China) Xiao Guodong	4
(England) Paul Davison	3
(China) Rouzi Maimaiti	4
(China) Liu Chuang	4
(China) Zhang Anda	3

Last 32; Best of 7 frames
(China) Mei Xiwen	4
(China) Xiao Guodong	3
(China) Rouzi Maimaiti	4
(China) Liu Chuang	3

Last 16; Best of 7 frames
(China) Mei Xiwen	1
(China) Rouzi Maimaiti	4

==== Section 4 ====
Last 128; Best of 7 frames
(China) Chen Ruifu	4
(China) Liu Jiaming	1
(China) Cui Ming	w/d
(China) Ha Simu	w/o
(Qatar) Ahmed Saif	1
(China) Zou Junhai	4
(China) Zhong Lin	4
(China) Zhang Hanxuan	1
(China) Lu Ning	4
(China) Lei Zhen	2
(China) Ma Bing	4
(China) Maihe Muti	0
(China) Liang Wenbo	4
(Hong Kong) Chan Mingtung	2

Last 64; Best of 7 frames
(China) Chen Ruifu	4
(China) Ha Simu	1
(China) Zou Junhai	3
(China) Zhong Lin	4
(China) Lu Ning	4
(China) Ma Bing	2
(China) Yu Delu	1
(China) Liang Wenbo	4

Last 32; Best of 7 frames
(China) Chen Ruifu	0
(China) Zhong Lin	4
(China) Lu Ning	3
(China) Liang Wenbo	4

Last 16; Best of 7 frames
(China) Zhong Lin	0
(China) Liang Wenbo	4

=== Bottom half ===
==== Section 5 ====
Last 128; Best of 7 frames
(Wales) Daniel Wells	2
(China) Wang Zepeng	4
(China) Hu Hao	4
(China) Chen Bo	1
(China) Zhao Xintong	4
(Hong Kong) Wai Ho Chung	0
(China) Xu Xinjian	4
(China) Xiao Wei	0
(China) Ju Reti	4
(China) Qin Jianfeng	2
(China) Wang Linhan	3
(China) Sun Jianjun	4
(China) Chen Zifan	w/o
(China) Zhang Dongtao	w/d

Last 64; Best of 7 frames
(China) Cao Yupeng	4
(China) Wang Zepeng	1
(China) Hu Hao	4
(China) Zhao Xintong	3
(China) Xu Xinjian	1
(China) Ju Reti	4
(China) Sun Jianjun	0
(China) Chen Zifan	4

Last 32; Best of 7 frames
(China) Cao Yupeng	4
(China) Hu Hao	3
(China) Ju Reti	4
(China) Chen Zifan	1

Last 16; Best of 7 frames
(China) Cao Yupeng	1
(China) Ju Reti	4

==== Section 6 ====
Last 128; Best of 7 frames
(England) Barry Pinches	w/d
(China) Chen Wen	w/o
(China) Pan Weixing	4
(China) Sun Hongrui	2
(Scotland) Ross Muir	4
(China) Geng Mingqi	2
(China) Da Hailin	4
(China) Shan Xianshu	3
(China) Li Hang	4
(China) Qiu Yalong	1
(China) Zhu Yinghui	4
(China) Li Chao	0

Last 64; Best of 7 frames
(China) Chen Wen	0
(China) Ding Junhui	4
(China) Pan Weixing	1
(Scotland) Ross Muir	4
(China) Da Hailin	4
(China) Li Hang	2
(England) Jack Lisowski	w/d
(China) Zhu Yinghui	w/o

Last 32; Best of 7 frames
(China) Ding Junhui	3
(Scotland) Ross Muir	4
(China) Da Hailin	4
(China) Zhu Yinghui	2

Last 16; Best of 7 frames
(Scotland) Ross Muir	0
(China) Da Hailin	4

==== Section 7 ====
Last 128; Best of 7 frames
(England) Mike Dunn	4
(China) Tian Jiaqi	0
(China) Cao Xinlong	4
(China) Liu Yiqi	0
(China) Lu Chenwei	4
(China) Mao Zhijun	0
(China) Li Yan	4
(China) Yao Pengcheng	2
(China) Chen Zhe	w/o
(China) Liang Mingzhu	w/d
(China) Lin Shuai	4
(China) He Guoqiang	1
(China) Yan Bingtao	4
(China) Pang Junxu	0

Last 64; Best of 7 frames
(England) Mike Dunn	3
(China) Cao Xinlong	4
(China) Lu Chenwei	4
(China) Li Yan	1
(Wales) Ryan Day	w/d
(China) Chen Zhe	w/o
(China) Lin Shuai	1
(China) Yan Bingtao	4

Last 32; Best of 7 frames
(China) Cao Xinlong	1
(China) Lu Chenwei	4
(China) Chen Zhe	1
(China) Yan Bingtao	4

Last 16; Best of 7 frames
(China) Lu Chenwei	4
(China) Yan Bingtao	3

==== Section 8 ====
Last 128; Best of 7 frames
(China) Tang Jun	4
(China) Huang Hooyong	3
(China) Zhang Yang	3
(Hong Kong) Au Chi-wai	4
(China) Shi Hanqing	4
(China) Ji Zhijun	2
(China) Jin Long	4
(China) Huang Jiahao	1
(China) Li Yuan	4
(China) Li Yingdong	0
(China) Zhang Yong	4
(China) Yuan Sijun	2
(China) Fang Xiongman	4
(China) Sun Peng	3

Last 64; Best of 7 frames
(China) Tang Jun	4
(Hong Kong) Au Chi-wai	2
(China) Shi Hanqing	1
(China) Jin Long	4
(China) Li Yuan	4
(China) Zhang Yong	1
(China) Fang Xiongman	4
(China) Tian Pengfei	3

Last 32; Best of 7 frames
(China) Tang Jun	4
(China) Jin Long	0
(China) Li Yuan	0
(China) Fang Xiongman	4

Last 16; Best of 7 frames
(China) Tang Jun	4
(China) Fang Xiongman	0

=== Finals ===
Quarter-finals; Best of 7 frames		Semi-finals; Best of 7 frames		Final; Best of 7 frames
(China) Zhou Yuelong	1
(England) Michael Holt	4	(England) Michael Holt	4
(China) Rouzi Maimaiti	1	(China) Liang Wenbo	1
(China) Liang Wenbo	4			(England) Michael Holt	1
(China) Ju Reti	4			(China) Ju Reti	4
(China) Da Hailin	3	(China) Ju Reti	4
(China) Lu Chenwei	4	(China) Lu Chenwei	2
(China) Tang Jun	2

== Century breaks ==
- 142 – Ju Reti
- 141 – Ding Junhui
- 137 – Niu Zhuang
- 135, 122, 110 – Zhou Yuelong
- 132 – Scott Donaldson
- 127 – Paul Davison
- 125 – Liu Chuang
- 122 – Mark Joyce
- 118, 105 – Tang Jun
- 116 – Huang Hooyong
- 108, 108 – Michael Holt
- 107, 101 – Ben Woollaston
- 104 – Daniel Wells
- 103, 100 – Liang Wenbo
- 103 – David Grace
- 101 – Mike Dunn
