= Asian Tour 2014/2015 – Event 2 =

Asian Tour 2014/2015 Event 2
Tournament information
- Dates: 20–24 October 2014
- Venue: Haining Sports Center
- City: Haining
- Country: China
- Organisation: World Snooker
- Format: Minor-ranking event
- Total prize fund: £51,000
- Winner's share: £10,000
- Highest break: Ryan Day (WAL) (147)

Final
- Champion: Stuart Bingham (ENG)
- Runner-up: Oliver Lines (ENG)
- Score: 4–0

The Asian Tour 2014/2015 – Event 2 (also known as the 2014 Haining China Leather City Open) was a professional minor-ranking snooker tournament that took place between 20 and 24 October 2014 at the Haining Sports Center in Haining, China.

Ryan Day made the 107th official maximum break during his last 32 match against Cao Yupeng. This was Day's first official 147 break and also the second maximum break in the 2014/2015 season.

Stuart Bingham won his fourth Asian Tour title by defeating Oliver Lines 4–0 in the final. The Haining Open was nineteen-year-old Lines' first professional final, in his maiden year on tour.

== Prize fund ==
The breakdown of prize money of the event is shown below:

	Prize fund
Winner	£10,000
Runner-up	£5,000
Semi-finalist	£2,500
Quarter-finalist	£1,500
Last 16	£1,000
Last 32	£600
Last 64	£200
Maximum break	£1,000
Total	£51,000

== Main draw ==
=== Preliminary round ===
Best of 7 frames

(China) Chen Wen	2–4	(China) Liu Jiaming
(China) He Guoqiang	4–0	(China) Bai Langning

(China) Sun Hongrui	4–2	(China) Liang Jianfeng

=== Main rounds ===
==== Top half ====
===== Section 1 =====
Last 128; Best of 7 frames
(China) Ding Junhui	4
(China) Li Wei	0
(China) Pa Ruke	3
(China) Zhang Yong	4
(Hong Kong) Au Chi-wai	4
(China) Ma Tingpeng	1
(England) Barry Pinches	4
(China) Bo Junjie	0
(England) Ian Glover	4
(China) Shi Liu	0
(England) Mark Davis	4
(China) Wang Zepeng	0
(China) Chen Zifan	4
(China) Liu Ren	2
(England) Joe Perry	4
(China) Shi Zhenlong	1

Last 64; Best of 7 frames
(China) Ding Junhui	4
(China) Zhang Yong	2
(Hong Kong) Au Chi-wai	1
(England) Barry Pinches	4
(England) Ian Glover	1
(England) Mark Davis	4
(China) Chen Zifan	1
(England) Joe Perry	4

Last 32; Best of 7 frames
(China) Ding Junhui	4
(England) Barry Pinches	1
(England) Mark Davis	0
(England) Joe Perry	4

Last 16; Best of 7 frames
(China) Ding Junhui	4
(England) Joe Perry	3

===== Section 2 =====
Last 128; Best of 7 frames
(Scotland) Ross Muir	4
(China) Huang Jiahao	3
(China) Liang Wenbo	3
(China) Chen Zhe	4
(China) Wang Heng	4
(China) Gao Le	1
(England) Craig Steadman	4
(China) Li Jiuwei	0
(England) Stuart Bingham	4
(China) A Bulajiang	1
(China) Yan Bingtao	4
(China) Liu Jiaming	3
(China) Chen Feilong	3
(China) Zhao Xintong	4
(Norway) Kurt Maflin	2
(China) Niu Zhuang	4

Last 64; Best of 7 frames
(Scotland) Ross Muir	4
(China) Chen Zhe	3
(China) Wang Heng	1
(England) Craig Steadman	4
(England) Stuart Bingham	4
(China) Yan Bingtao	1
(China) Zhao Xintong	4
(China) Niu Zhuang	2

Last 32; Best of 7 frames
(Scotland) Ross Muir	4
(England) Craig Steadman	0
(England) Stuart Bingham	4
(China) Zhao Xintong	2

Last 16; Best of 7 frames
(Scotland) Ross Muir	3
(England) Stuart Bingham	4

===== Section 3 =====
Last 128; Best of 7 frames
(Thailand) Dechawat Poomjaeng	4
(China) Huang Nian	2
(England) Jimmy White	4
(China) Wang Pengfei	1
(China) Tang Jun	4
(China) Ma Bing	1
(China) Liu Chuang	1
(China) Wang Yuchen	4
(England) Matthew Selt	4
(China) Zhang Zihao	0
(England) Ian Burns	4
(China) Jin Long	0
(China) Guan Zhen	4
(China) Pang Junxu	0
(China) Cao Xinlong	4
(China) Li Zhen	2

Last 64; Best of 7 frames
(Thailand) Dechawat Poomjaeng	0
(England) Jimmy White	4
(China) Tang Jun	4
(China) Wang Yuchen	1
(England) Matthew Selt	4
(England) Ian Burns	0
(China) Guan Zhen	4
(China) Cao Xinlong	0

Last 32; Best of 7 frames
(England) Jimmy White	4
(China) Tang Jun	0
(England) Matthew Selt	4
(China) Guan Zhen	0

Last 16; Best of 7 frames
(England) Jimmy White	0
(England) Matthew Selt	4

===== Section 4 =====
Last 128; Best of 7 frames
(China) Zhang Anda	2
(China) Lin Shuai	4
(Australia) Vinnie Calabrese	w/d
(China) He Guoqiang	w/o
(England) Alex Davies	w/d
(China) Hu Yufan	w/o
(China) Lu Ning	4
(China) Pan Weixing	2
(China) Lu Chenwei	4
(England) Paul Davison	2
(England) Peter Ebdon	4
(China) Ren Jiaxing	1
(China) Cheng Sihong	4
(China) Zhang Cunyue	0
(Scotland) Scott Donaldson	4
(China) Maihe Muti	2

Last 64; Best of 7 frames
(China) Lin Shuai	4
(China) He Guoqiang	2
(China) Hu Yufan	0
(China) Lu Ning	4
(China) Lu Chenwei	1
(England) Peter Ebdon	4
(China) Cheng Sihong	2
(Scotland) Scott Donaldson	4

Last 32; Best of 7 frames
(China) Lin Shuai	4
(China) Lu Ning	3
(England) Peter Ebdon	4
(Scotland) Scott Donaldson	2

Last 16; Best of 7 frames
(China) Lin Shuai	2
(England) Peter Ebdon	4

==== Bottom half ====
===== Section 5 =====
Last 128; Best of 7 frames
(China) Li Hang	4
(China) Li Yan	2
(England) Sean O'Sullivan	4
(China) Lin Yongzhi	2
(China) Mei Xiwen	4
(China) Zhang Xinwei	0
(China) Tian Pengfei	4
(Hong Kong) Lin Tang Ho	3
(China) Ju Reti	4
(China) Feng Zeyuan	3
(China) Cai Jianzhong	2
(China) Wang Wu	4
(China) Fang Xiongman	4
(China) Sun Hongrui	0
(England) Ben Woollaston	4
(China) Wang Peng	0

Last 64; Best of 7 frames
(China) Li Hang	4
(England) Sean O'Sullivan	2
(China) Mei Xiwen	1
(China) Tian Pengfei	4
(China) Ju Reti	4
(China) Wang Wu	1
(China) Fang Xiongman	2
(England) Ben Woollaston	4

Last 32; Best of 7 frames
(China) Li Hang	3
(China) Tian Pengfei	4
(China) Ju Reti	2
(England) Ben Woollaston	4

Last 16; Best of 7 frames
(China) Tian Pengfei	4
(England) Ben Woollaston	1

===== Section 6 =====
Last 128; Best of 7 frames
(Thailand) Thepchaiya Un-Nooh	4
(China) Sun Peng	0
(England) Jimmy Robertson	4
(China) Li Tianen	1
(Wales) Andrew Pagett	3
(China) Xu Si	4
(Thailand) Noppon Saengkham	4
(China) Wang Chenkai	3
(Hong Kong) Marco Fu	w/d
(China) Da Hailin	w/o
(China) Lyu Haotian	2
(China) Hu Hao	4
(China) Shan Xianshu	1
(China) Chen Junhao	4
(China) Xiao Guodong	4
(China) Yao Pengcheng	0

Last 64; Best of 7 frames
(Thailand) Thepchaiya Un-Nooh	3
(England) Jimmy Robertson	4
(China) Xu Si	4
(Thailand) Noppon Saengkham	3
(China) Da Hailin	4
(China) Hu Hao	3
(China) Chen Junhao	1
(China) Xiao Guodong	4

Last 32; Best of 7 frames
(England) Jimmy Robertson	4
(China) Xu Si	1
(China) Da Hailin	2
(China) Xiao Guodong	4

Last 16; Best of 7 frames
(England) Jimmy Robertson	4
(China) Xiao Guodong	0

===== Section 7 =====
Last 128; Best of 7 frames
(China) Yu Delu	2
(Scotland) Eden Sharav	4
(China) Luo Honghao	4
(China) Wang Baosheng	1
(England) Mike Dunn	4
(China) Zhang Yadong	1
(Wales) Mark Williams	4
(China) Zhang Hanxuan	0
(China) Zhou Yuelong	4
(China) Chen Ruifu	2
(England) Mitchell Mann	4
(China) Li Yujin	1
(China) Zhong Lin	4
(China) Lin Chuangwei	2
(England) Oliver Lines	4
(China) Zhao Hanyang	0

Last 64; Best of 7 frames
(Scotland) Eden Sharav	0
(China) Luo Honghao	4
(England) Mike Dunn	4
(Wales) Mark Williams	0
(China) Zhou Yuelong	4
(England) Mitchell Mann	2
(China) Zhong Lin	1
(England) Oliver Lines	4

Last 32; Best of 7 frames
(China) Luo Honghao	1
(England) Mike Dunn	4
(China) Zhou Yuelong	2
(England) Oliver Lines	4

Last 16; Best of 7 frames
(England) Mike Dunn	3
(England) Oliver Lines	4

===== Section 8 =====
Last 128; Best of 7 frames
(Scotland) Graeme Dott	4
(China) Geng Mingqi	2
(England) Liam Highfield	w/d
(China) Cao Kaisheng	w/o
(England) Mark Joyce	4
(China) Zhou Jun	3
(England) Mark King	4
(China) Chen Yaochen	0
(China) Cao Yupeng	4
(China) Sun Chang	2
(England) Ricky Walden	4
(China) Yin Xiaowei	0
(China) Rouzi Maimaiti	4
(China) Fan Zhengyi	2
(Wales) Ryan Day	4
(China) Ding Kai	0

Last 64; Best of 7 frames
(Scotland) Graeme Dott	4
(China) Cao Kaisheng	2
(England) Mark Joyce	0
(England) Mark King	4
(China) Cao Yupeng	4
(England) Ricky Walden	0
(China) Rouzi Maimaiti	0
(Wales) Ryan Day	4

Last 32; Best of 7 frames
(Scotland) Graeme Dott	4
(England) Mark King	1
(China) Cao Yupeng	1
(Wales) Ryan Day	4

Last 16; Best of 7 frames
(Scotland) Graeme Dott	1
(Wales) Ryan Day	4

==== Finals ====
Quarter-finals; Best of 7 frames		Semi-finals; Best of 7 frames		Final; Best of 7 frames
(China) Ding Junhui	0
(England) Stuart Bingham	4	(England) Stuart Bingham	4
(England) Matthew Selt	4	(England) Matthew Selt	1
(England) Peter Ebdon	3			(England) Stuart Bingham	4
(China) Tian Pengfei	2			(England) Oliver Lines	0
(England) Jimmy Robertson	4	(England) Jimmy Robertson	3
(England) Oliver Lines	4	(England) Oliver Lines	4
(Wales) Ryan Day	2

== Century breaks ==
- 147, 139 – Ryan Day
- 137, 137, 114, 102, 101 – Stuart Bingham
- 136 – Jimmy White
- 130 – Ross Muir
- 127 – Liang Wenbo
- 126, 123 – Ding Junhui
- 123, 106 – Graeme Dott
- 121 – Tian Pengfei
- 120, 113 – Oliver Lines
- 115 – Mark Davis
- 114, 101, 100 – Jimmy Robertson
- 113, 100 – Zhao Xintong
- 104 – Joe Perry
- 102 – Matthew Selt
