= Asian Tour 2015/2016 – Event 1 =

Asian Tour 2015/2016 Event 1
Tournament information
- Dates: 19–23 October 2015
- Venue: Haining Sports Center
- City: Haining
- Country: China
- Organisation: World Snooker
- Format: Minor-ranking event
- Total prize fund: £70,000
- Winner's share: £13,500
- Highest break: Tian Pengfei (CHN) (135); Liang Wenbo (CHN) (135)

Final
- Champion: Ding Junhui (CHN)
- Runner-up: Ricky Walden (ENG)
- Score: 4–3

The Asian Tour 2015/2016 – Event 1 (also known as the 2015 Haining Open) was a professional minor-ranking snooker tournament that took place between 19 and 23 October 2015 in Haining, China.

Stuart Bingham was the defending champion, but chose not to defend his title; Ding Junhui won the title for the first time, beating Ricky Walden 4–3 in the final.

== Prize fund ==
The breakdown of prize money of the event is shown below:

	Prize fund
Winner	£13,500
Runner-up	£6,500
Semi-finalist	£3,500
Quarter-finalist	£1,750
Last 16	£1,300
Last 32	£800
Last 64	£400
Total	£70,000

== Main draw ==
=== Round 1 ===
Best of 7 frames

(Hong Kong) Ng On Yee	3–4	(China) Ding Kai
(Hong Kong) Andy Lee	4–1	(China) Gong Xiaoqing
(China) Pan Weixing	4–0	(China) Wang Haonan
(China) Shen Haoran	1–4	(China) Duan Yanfeng
(China) Qin Jianfeng	w/o–w/d	(England) Hammad Miah
(China) Zhang Yang	4–1	(China) Wu Shengguang
(China) Zhang Zhijie	4–0	(Hong Kong) Chau Hon Man
(China) Si Jiaxin	4–2	(China) Wang Chenkai
(China) Lu Jiaming	4–3	(China) Ren Zuijie
(China) Yao Pengcheng	4–2	(China) Long Zehuang
(China) Li Yan	4–2	(China) Li Yingdong

(England) Nico Elton	3–4	(China) Li Zhen
(China) Chen Wen	4–2	(England) Elliot Slessor
(Hong Kong) Lin Tang Ho	0–4	(China) Zhang Chi
(China) Zhang Zihao	4–2	(China) Min Changqing
(Republic of Ireland) Leo Fernandez	4–2	(China) Ren Jiaxing
(China) Chen Feng	2–4	(China) Zhao Hanyang
(England) Sam Craigie	w/d–w/o	(China) Wu Sicheng
(China) Deng Jinhong	0–4	(China) Huang Zishun
(China) Sun Chang	4–3	(England) George Pragnall
(China) Li Ningning	4–1	(China) Chang Bingyu

=== Top half ===
==== Section 1 ====
Last 128; Best of 7 frames
(China) Ding Junhui	4
(China) Xu Si	1
(China) Tang Jun	4
(China) Ding Kai	0
(China) Lu Ning	3
(China) Wang Zepeng	4
(England) Peter Lines	4
(China) He Wenchong	0
(China) Cao Yupeng	4
(Hong Kong) Andy Lee	0
(China) Ju Reti	0
(China) Liu Fan	4
(Malaysia) Thor Chuan Leong	3
(China) He Guoqiang	4
(England) Mark King	4
(China) Pan Weixing	1

Last 64; Best of 7 frames
(China) Ding Junhui	4
(China) Tang Jun	0
(China) Wang Zepeng	2
(England) Peter Lines	4
(China) Cao Yupeng	3
(China) Liu Fan	4
(China) He Guoqiang	1
(England) Mark King	4

Last 32; Best of 7 frames
(China) Ding Junhui	4
(England) Peter Lines	3
(China) Liu Fan	0
(England) Mark King	4

Last 16; Best of 7 frames
(China) Ding Junhui	4
(England) Mark King	1

==== Section 2 ====
Last 128; Best of 7 frames
(Norway) Kurt Maflin	4
(China) Song Yang	1
(Scotland) Ross Muir	4
(China) Cheng Sihong	3
(Wales) Gareth Allen	1
(China) Hu Hao	4
(China) Zhang Anda	4
(China) Sun Peng	2
(Thailand) Dechawat Poomjaeng	4
(China) Chen Zhe	3
(China) Cao Xinlong	w/d
(China) Mei Xiwen	w/o
(China) Chen Zifan	3
(China) Duan Yanfeng	4
(China) Liang Wenbo	4
(China) Chen Bo	0

Last 64; Best of 7 frames
(Norway) Kurt Maflin	4
(Scotland) Ross Muir	2
(China) Hu Hao	3
(China) Zhang Anda	4
(Thailand) Dechawat Poomjaeng	0
(China) Mei Xiwen	4
(China) Duan Yanfeng	2
(China) Liang Wenbo	4

Last 32; Best of 7 frames
(Norway) Kurt Maflin	1
(China) Zhang Anda	4
(China) Mei Xiwen	2
(China) Liang Wenbo	4

Last 16; Best of 7 frames
(China) Zhang Anda	4
(China) Liang Wenbo	3

==== Section 3 ====
Last 128; Best of 7 frames
(China) Xiao Guodong	4
(China) Qin Jianfeng	0
(England) Steven Hallworth	2
(China) Zhang Yang	4
(China) Yan Bingtao	2
(England) Oliver Brown	4
(China) Zhou Yuelong	4
(Northern Ireland) Conor McCormack	0
(England) Barry Pinches	4
(China) Li Yujin	1
(China) Zhang Yong	2
(China) Paruke Aierken	4
(England) Chris Wakelin	3
(China) Luo Honghao	4
(England) Jimmy Robertson	4
(China) Zhang Zhijie	0

Last 64; Best of 7 frames
(China) Xiao Guodong	4
(China) Zhang Yang	1
(England) Oliver Brown	2
(China) Zhou Yuelong	4
(England) Barry Pinches	4
(China) Paruke Aierken	2
(China) Luo Honghao	1
(England) Jimmy Robertson	4

Last 32; Best of 7 frames
(China) Xiao Guodong	4
(China) Zhou Yuelong	1
(England) Barry Pinches	3
(England) Jimmy Robertson	4

Last 16; Best of 7 frames
(China) Xiao Guodong	1
(England) Jimmy Robertson	4

==== Section 4 ====
Last 128; Best of 7 frames
(Thailand) Thepchaiya Un-Nooh	4
(China) Qi Guoxiao	1
(Thailand) James Wattana	4
(China) Si Jiaxin	3
(China) Cai Jianzhong	4
(China) Liu Jiaming	2
(China) Yu Delu	3
(China) Huang Zhong	4
(England) Michael Wasley	1
(China) Yao Pengcheng	4
(England) Sean O'Sullivan	4
(China) Chen Junhao	0
(England) James Cahill	4
(China) Jin Long	2
(Hong Kong) Marco Fu	4
(China) Zhao Xintong	1

Last 64; Best of 7 frames
(Thailand) Thepchaiya Un-Nooh	4
(Thailand) James Wattana	0
(China) Cai Jianzhong	4
(China) Huang Zhong	2
(China) Yao Pengcheng	1
(England) Sean O'Sullivan	4
(England) James Cahill	1
(Hong Kong) Marco Fu	4

Last 32; Best of 7 frames
(Thailand) Thepchaiya Un-Nooh	4
(China) Cai Jianzhong	2
(England) Sean O'Sullivan	3
(Hong Kong) Marco Fu	4

Last 16; Best of 7 frames
(Thailand) Thepchaiya Un-Nooh	4
(Hong Kong) Marco Fu	3

=== Bottom half ===
==== Section 5 ====
Last 128; Best of 7 frames
(Scotland) John Higgins	4
(China) Li Yan	1
(China) Guan Zhen	4
(China) Pang Junxu	2
(China) Zhong Lin	4
(China) Cao Kaisheng	3
(England) Oliver Lines	1
(China) Li Yuan	4
(England) Tom Ford	4
(India) Hritik Jain	0
(China) Rouzi Maimaiti	4
(China) Li Zhen	0
(China) Fang Xiongman	3
(China) Fan Zhengyi	4
(England) Ben Woollaston	4
(China) Chen Wen	2

Last 64; Best of 7 frames
(Scotland) John Higgins	4
(China) Guan Zhen	2
(China) Zhong Lin	0
(China) Li Yuan	4
(England) Tom Ford	4
(China) Rouzi Maimaiti	1
(China) Fan Zhengyi	3
(England) Ben Woollaston	4

Last 32; Best of 7 frames
(Scotland) John Higgins	4
(China) Li Yuan	2
(England) Tom Ford	1
(England) Ben Woollaston	4

Last 16; Best of 7 frames
(Scotland) John Higgins	3
(England) Ben Woollaston	4

==== Section 6 ====
Last 128; Best of 7 frames
(Wales) Dominic Dale	4
(China) Wang Peng	1
(China) Lin Shuai	1
(China) Yuan Sijun	4
(Thailand) Noppon Saengkham	w/o
(China) Shan Xianshu	w/d
(Scotland) Scott Donaldson	4
(China) Zhang Chi	1
(Thailand) Thanawat Thirapongpaiboon	4
(China) Geng Mingqi	2
(England) Ian Glover	4
(China) Xu Yuan	2
(England) Sydney Wilson	2
(China) Zhang Zihao	4
(England) Robert Milkins	4
(China) Feng Zeyuan	2

Last 64; Best of 7 frames
(Wales) Dominic Dale	4
(China) Yuan Sijun	0
(Thailand) Noppon Saengkham	1
(Scotland) Scott Donaldson	4
(Thailand) Thanawat Thirapongpaiboon	4
(England) Ian Glover	0
(China) Zhang Zihao	1
(England) Robert Milkins	4

Last 32; Best of 7 frames
(Wales) Dominic Dale	4
(Scotland) Scott Donaldson	2
(Thailand) Thanawat Thirapongpaiboon	0
(England) Robert Milkins	4

Last 16; Best of 7 frames
(Wales) Dominic Dale	3
(England) Robert Milkins	4

==== Section 7 ====
Last 128; Best of 7 frames
(England) Matthew Selt	3
(Republic of Ireland) Leo Fernandez	4
(China) Lu Chenwei	3
(China) Zhao Hanyang	4
(England) Paul Davison	4
(England) Charlie Walters	2
(China) Li Hang	4
(China) Ma Ting Peng	2
(China) Tian Pengfei	4
(China) Lei Zhen	0
(China) Chen Feilong	4
(China) Wu Sicheng	0
(England) Martin O'Donnell	4
(England) Michael Williams	0
(England) Gary Wilson	4
(China) Huang Jiahao	2

Last 64; Best of 7 frames
(Republic of Ireland) Leo Fernandez	4
(China) Zhao Hanyang	0
(England) Paul Davison	3
(China) Li Hang	4
(China) Tian Pengfei	4
(China) Chen Feilong	0
(England) Martin O'Donnell	4
(England) Gary Wilson	2

Last 32; Best of 7 frames
(Republic of Ireland) Leo Fernandez	4
(China) Li Hang	0
(China) Tian Pengfei	4
(England) Martin O'Donnell	2

Last 16; Best of 7 frames
(Republic of Ireland) Leo Fernandez	4
(China) Tian Pengfei	3

==== Section 8 ====
Last 128; Best of 7 frames
(England) Mike Dunn	2
(China) Lyu Haotian	4
(England) Sanderson Lam	4
(China) Ma Daojun	2
(China) Ma Bing	4
(China) Huang Zishun	0
(England) Craig Steadman	4
(Hong Kong) Man Ming Wa	0
(England) Michael Georgiou	4
(China) Wang Yuchen	1
(China) Niu Zhuang	4
(China) Sun Chang	1
(Hong Kong) Au Chi-wai	4
(China) Si Jiahui	2
(England) Ricky Walden	4
(China) Li Ningning	0

Last 64; Best of 7 frames
(China) Lyu Haotian	4
(England) Sanderson Lam	1
(China) Ma Bing	4
(England) Craig Steadman	2
(England) Michael Georgiou	4
(China) Niu Zhuang	3
(Hong Kong) Au Chi-wai	2
(England) Ricky Walden	4

Last 32; Best of 7 frames
(China) Lyu Haotian	4
(China) Ma Bing	2
(England) Michael Georgiou	1
(England) Ricky Walden	4

Last 16; Best of 7 frames
(China) Lyu Haotian	1
(England) Ricky Walden	4

=== Finals ===
Quarter-finals; Best of 7 frames		Semi-finals; Best of 7 frames		Final; Best of 7 frames
(China) Ding Junhui	4
(China) Zhang Anda	3	(China) Ding Junhui	4
(England) Jimmy Robertson	4	(England) Jimmy Robertson	2
(Thailand) Thepchaiya Un-Nooh	3			(China) Ding Junhui	4
(England) Ben Woollaston	2			(England) Ricky Walden	3
(England) Robert Milkins	4	(England) Robert Milkins	1
(Republic of Ireland) Leo Fernandez	1	(England) Ricky Walden	4
(England) Ricky Walden	4

== Century breaks ==
- 135, 127, 122 – Tian Pengfei
- 135 – Liang Wenbo
- 130, 123, 121, 102, 100 – Ding Junhui
- 128 – Jimmy Robertson
- 122 – Lyu Haotian
- 121 – Wang Yuchen
- 119, 117, 108 – Marco Fu
- 115, 100 – Ricky Walden
- 110 – James Wattana
- 106 – John Higgins
- 106 – Ding Kai
- 105 – Zhang Anda
- 101 – Hu Hao
- 100 – Robert Milkins
