= 2018 Haining Open =

CBSA Haining Snooker International Open
Tournament information
- Dates: 31 July – 4 August 2018
- Venue: International Campus Zhejiang University
- City: Haining
- Country: China
- Organisation: Chinese Billiards & Snooker Association
- Format: Non-ranking event
- Total prize fund: ¥472,000
- Winner's share: ¥120,000
- Highest break: (England) Joe Perry (123)

Final
- Champion: (England) Mark Selby
- Runner-up: (China) Li Hang
- Score: 5–4

The 2018 CBSA Haining Snooker International Open was a non-ranking snooker tournament that took place between 31 July–4 August 2018 in Haining, China.

== Prize fund ==
The breakdown of prize money of the event is shown below:

	Prize fund
Winner	¥120,000
Runner-up	¥50,000
Semi-finalist	¥20,000
Quarter-finalist	¥10,000
Last 16	¥6,000
Last 32	¥4,000
Last 64	¥2,500
Highest break	¥10,000
Maximum break	¥20,000
Total	¥472,000

== Main draw ==
=== Top half ===
==== Section 1 ====
Last 128; Best of 7 frames
(China) Ren Jiaxing	0
(China) Liang Xiaolong	4
(China) Liu Hongyu	1
(China) Long Zehuang	4
(China) Cai Jianzhong	4
(China) Yuan Sijun	2
(England) Mark Selby	4
(Germany) Simon Lichtenberg	3
(England) Paul Davison	4
(China) Li Zhen	2
(China) Qiao Tianhao	0
(China) Si Jiahui	4
(China) Ma Yinzhu	0
(China) Wang Zepeng	4

Last 64; Best of 7 frames
(China) Zhang Anda	4
(China) Liang Xiaolong	2
(China) Long Zehuang	3
(China) Cai Jianzhong	4
(England) Mark Selby	4
(England) Paul Davison	0
(China) Si Jiahui	4
(China) Wang Zepeng	2

Last 32; Best of 7 frames
(China) Zhang Anda	4
(China) Cai Jianzhong	1
(England) Mark Selby	4
(China) Si Jiahui	1

Last 16; Best of 7 frames
(China) Zhang Anda	1
(England) Mark Selby	4

==== Section 2 ====
Last 128; Best of 7 frames
(China) Rouzi Maimaiti	4
(China) Cai Yifan	1
(Thailand) Nutcharut Wongharuthai	1
(China) Bo Junjie	4
(China) Xing Zihao	1
(China) Zhang Zhijie	4
(China) Yang Zhongjie	0
(England) Gary Wilson	4
(England) Mark Davis	1
(China) Li Jianbing	4
(China) Yang Ke	0
(China) Pang Junxu	4
(China) Zhang Hao	3
(China) Peng Yisong	4
(China) Lyu Chenwei	3
(China) Li Yuan	4

Last 64; Best of 7 frames
(China) Rouzi Maimaiti	2
(China) Bo Junjie	4
(China) Zhang Zhijie	1
(England) Gary Wilson	4
(China) Li Jianbing	1
(China) Pang Junxu	4
(China) Peng Yisong	3
(China) Li Yuan	4

Last 32; Best of 7 frames
(China) Bo Junjie	1
(England) Gary Wilson	4
(China) Pang Junxu	3
(China) Li Yuan	4

Last 16; Best of 7 frames
(England) Gary Wilson	4
(China) Li Yuan	2

==== Section 3 ====
Last 128; Best of 7 frames
(China) Zhang Yang	4
(Japan) Keishin Kamihashi	1
(China) Wang Haonan	0
(Thailand) Sompol Saetang	4
(China) Song Changhui	1
(Thailand) Thepchaiya Un-Nooh	4
(England) Mark King	4
(Myanmar) Ko Htet	0
(China) Sima Jun	1
(Germany) Lukas Kleckers	4
(China) Guan Zhen	3
(China) Deng Haohui	4
(China) Fang Xiongman	0
(China) He Guoqiang	4

Last 64; Best of 7 frames
(China) Bai Langning	0
(China) Zhang Yang	4
(Thailand) Sompol Saetang	0
(Thailand) Thepchaiya Un-Nooh	4
(England) Mark King	4
(Germany) Lukas Kleckers	2
(China) Deng Haohui	3
(China) He Guoqiang	4

Last 32; Best of 7 frames
(China) Zhang Yang	4
(Thailand) Thepchaiya Un-Nooh	2
(England) Mark King	4
(China) He Guoqiang	3

Last 16; Best of 7 frames
(China) Zhang Yang	0
(England) Mark King	4

==== Section 4 ====
Last 128; Best of 7 frames
(China) Ma Chunmao	4
(China) Tian Chunming	0
(China) Xu Yuan	4
(China) Tang Jun	2
(China) Cai Wei	2
(China) Wang Peng	4
(China) Qin Jianfeng	1
(England) Joe Perry	4
(England) Matthew Selt	4
(China) Hong Chengchun	0
(China) Chen Ruifu	4
(China) Tang Hewen	0
(China) Geng Mingqi	4
(China) Li Ting	2

Last 64; Best of 7 frames
(China) Ma Chunmao	4
(China) Xu Yuan	2
(China) Wang Peng	1
(England) Joe Perry	4
(England) Matthew Selt	4
(China) Chen Ruifu	3
(China) Geng Mingqi	0
(China) Chang Bingyu	4

Last 32; Best of 7 frames
(China) Ma Chunmao	1
(England) Joe Perry	4
(England) Matthew Selt	4
(China) Chang Bingyu	3

Last 16; Best of 7 frames
(England) Joe Perry	2
(England) Matthew Selt	4

=== Bottom half ===
==== Section 5 ====
Last 128; Best of 7 frames
(China) Li Yingdong	4
(China) Liu Yiqi	3
(China) Zhao Jianbo	4
(England) Barrie Vesty	0
(China) Jiang Jun	0
(England) Elliot Slessor	4
(China) Liang Wenbo	4
(China) Liu Xin	1
(China) Bai Yulu	2
(China) Liu Jiaming	4
(China) Huang Zhong	4
(China) Deng Jinhong	0
(Myanmar) Win Ko Ko	1
(Thailand) Suchakree Poomjang	4

Last 64; Best of 7 frames
(China) Li Hang	4
(China) Li Yingdong	0
(China) Zhao Jianbo	1
(England) Elliot Slessor	4
(China) Liang Wenbo	0
(China) Liu Jiaming	4
(China) Huang Zhong	4
(Thailand) Suchakree Poomjang	2

Last 32; Best of 7 frames
(China) Li Hang	4
(England) Elliot Slessor	1
(China) Liu Jiaming	3
(China) Huang Zhong	4

Last 16; Best of 7 frames
(China) Li Hang	4
(China) Huang Zhong	0

==== Section 6 ====
Last 128; Best of 7 frames
(China) Mei Xiwen	4
(China) Song Yang	0
(China) Zhou Jun	4
(China) Ouyang Shuji	3
(Myanmar) Phone Myint Kyaw	4
(China) Yin Siaowei	2
(China) Li Zhao	0
(England) Michael Holt	4
(England) Mike Dunn	4
(China) Tao Guanyun	0
(China) Tian Wenshun	3
(China) Sun Jianjun	4
(China) Yang Jiaxin	3
(China) Zhong Lin	4
(China) Wu Junchi	w/o
(China) Niu Zhuang	w/d

Last 64; Best of 7 frames
(China) Mei Xiwen	4
(China) Zhou Jun	1
(Myanmar) Phone Myint Kyaw	1
(England) Michael Holt	4
(England) Mike Dunn	4
(China) Sun Jianjun	0
(China) Zhong Lin	4
(China) Wu Junchi	3

Last 32; Best of 7 frames
(China) Mei Xiwen	4
(England) Michael Holt	3
(England) Mike Dunn	4
(China) Zhong Lin	1

Last 16; Best of 7 frames
(China) Mei Xiwen	4
(England) Mike Dunn	0

==== Section 7 ====
Last 128; Best of 7 frames
(China) Ju Reti	4
(China) Ma Tingpeng	2
(China) Hu Hao	4
(China) Ren Jun	2
(China) Yang Qingtian	4
(China) Li Yan	1
(Singapore) Soh Hong Hwee	0
(Cyprus) Michael Georgiou	4
(England) Jimmy Robertson	4
(China) Zhang Kai	1
(China) Jiao Xingyu	4
(China) Wu Yize	2
(China) Qiu Yalong	4
(China) Xia Bo	2
(China) Wu Shengguang	3
(China) Chen Zhe	4

Last 64; Best of 7 frames
(China) Ju Reti	4
(China) Hu Hao	1
(China) Yang Qingtian	1
(Cyprus) Michael Georgiou	4
(England) Jimmy Robertson	4
(China) Jiao Xingyu	0
(China) Qiu Yalong	1
(China) Chen Zhe	4

Last 32; Best of 7 frames
(China) Ju Reti	4
(Cyprus) Michael Georgiou	2
(England) Jimmy Robertson	3
(China) Chen Zhe	4

Last 16; Best of 7 frames
(China) Ju Reti	4
(China) Chen Zhe	2

==== Section 8 ====
Last 128; Best of 7 frames
(China) Huang Jiahao	0
(Hong Kong) Andy Lee	4
(China) Gao Yang	w/o
(China) Peng Gangyong	w/d
(China) Wang Yuchen	4
(China) Wu Ze	2
(China) Qi Guoxiao	0
(England) Barry Hawkins	4
(Thailand) Sunny Akani	4
(China) Chen Feng	1
(China) Lei Peifan	3
(China) Luo Zetao	4
(China) Shen Haoran	3
(China) Yao Pengcheng	4

Last 64; Best of 7 frames
(Hong Kong) Andy Lee	4
(China) Gao Yang	0
(China) Wang Yuchen	4
(England) Barry Hawkins	2
(Thailand) Sunny Akani	4
(China) Luo Zetao	0
(China) Yao Pengcheng	4
(China) Fan Zhengyi	1

Last 32; Best of 7 frames
(Hong Kong) Andy Lee	0
(China) Wang Yuchen	4
(Thailand) Sunny Akani	4
(China) Yao Pengcheng	2

Last 16; Best of 7 frames
(China) Wang Yuchen	0
(Thailand) Sunny Akani	4

=== Finals ===
Quarter-finals; Best of 7 frames
(England) Mark Selby	4
(England) Gary Wilson	1
(England) Mark King	4
(England) Matthew Selt	2
(China) Li Hang	4
(China) Mei Xiwen	0
(China) Ju Reti	2
(Thailand) Sunny Akani	4

Semi-finals; Best of 7 frames
(England) Mark Selby	4
(England) Mark King	2
(China) Li Hang	4
(Thailand) Sunny Akani	2

Final; Best of 9 frames
(England) Mark Selby	5
(China) Li Hang	4

== Final ==
Final: Best of 9 frames. Referee: International Campus Zhejiang University, Haining, China, 4 August 2018.
Mark Selby; England	5–4	Li Hang; China
58–76 (52, 70), 20–69 (69), 40–72, 65–53, 20–63 (51), 73–32 (68), 74–51 (Li 51), 58–42, 64–33
68	Highest break	70
0	Century breaks	0
2	50+ breaks	4
