= Yixing Open =

Snooker tournament in Yixing, China

Tournament information
- Venue: Yixing Sports Centre
- Location: Yixing
- Country: China
- Established: 2013
- Organisation(s): World Professional Billiards and Snooker Association
- Format: Minor-ranking event
- Total prize fund: £50,000
- Final year: 2014
- Final champion: (China) Ding Junhui

The Yixing Open was a pro–am minor-ranking snooker tournament which is part of the Players Tour Championship. The tournament started in 2013 and was staged at the Yixing Sports Centre in Yixing, China. Ding Junhui was the last champion.

== Winners ==
Year	Winner	Runner-up	Final score	Season
2013	(England) Joe Perry	(England) Mark Selby	4–1	2013/14
2014	(China) Ding Junhui	(England) Michael Holt	4–2	2014/15

== See also ==
- Asian Players Tour Championship 2012/2013 – Event 2
