= 2014 Players Tour Championship Grand Final =

2014 Wyldecrest Parks Players Tour Championship Grand Final

Tournament information
- Dates: 25–29 March 2014
- Venue: Preston Guild Hall
- City: Preston
- Country: England
- Organisation: World Snooker
- Format: Ranking event
- Total prize fund: £300,000
- Winner's share: £100,000
- Highest break: Ronnie O'Sullivan (ENG) (140)

Final
- Champion: Barry Hawkins (ENG)
- Runner-up: Gerard Greene (NIR)
- Score: 4–0

The 2014 Players Tour Championship Grand Final (officially the 2014 Wyldecrest Parks Players Tour Championship Grand Final) was a professional ranking snooker tournament that took place between 25 and 29 March 2014 at the Guild Hall in Preston, England. It was the tenth ranking event of the 2013/2014 season.

It was originally planned, that the event would take place in Bangkok, Thailand, but due to the political unrest in the country the World Professional Billiards and Snooker Association decided to relocate the event. This was the first professional tournament at the Guild Hall since the 2005 Grand Prix.

Ding Junhui was the defending champion, but he lost 3–4 against Ben Woollaston in the last 32.

Barry Hawkins won his second ranking title by defeating Gerard Greene 4–0 in the final. This was Greene's first ranking final.

== Prize fund and ranking points ==
The breakdown of prize money and ranking points of the event is shown below:

	Prize fund	Ranking points
Winner	£100,000	3,000
Runner-up	£38,000	2,400
Semi-finalist	£20,000	1,920
Quarter-finalist	£10,000	1,500
Last 16	£5,000	1,140
Last 32	£2,500	840
Highest break	£2,000	–
Total	£300,000	–

== Seeding list ==
The players competed in 12 minor-ranking tournaments to earn points for the European Tour and Asian Tour Order of Merits. The seeding list of the Finals was based on the combined list from the earnings of both Order of Merits.

Rank	Player	European Tour	Asian Tour	Total points
1	Mark Allen (NIR)	45,250	0	45,250
2	Mark Selby (ENG)	37,516	5,200	42,716
3	Ronnie O'Sullivan (ENG)	38,616	0	38,616
4	Mark Williams (WAL)	30,683	0	30,683
5	Shaun Murphy (ENG)	29,499	0	29,499
6	John Higgins (SCO)	26,350	1,200	27,550
7	Ricky Walden (ENG)	25,100	0	25,100
8	Stuart Bingham (ENG)	12,783	10,200	22,983
9	Ding Junhui (CHN)	18,333	2,600	20,933
10	Liang Wenbo (CHN)	2,783	17,700	20,483
11	Judd Trump (ENG)	20,249	0	20,249
12	Fergal O'Brien (IRL)	17,199	0	17,199
13	Sam Baird (ENG)	16,351	0	16,351
14	Joe Perry (ENG)	5,682	10,000	15,682
15	Marco Fu (HKG)	15,100	200	15,300
16	Stephen Maguire (SCO)	14,766	0	14,766
17	Neil Robertson (AUS)	14,083	0	14,083
18	Gerard Greene (NIR)	12,783	600	13,383
19	Jamie Jones (WAL)	13,100	200	13,300
20	Gary Wilson (ENG)	10,032	3,200	13,232
21	Ben Woollaston (ENG)	10,516	2,400	12,916
22	David Gilbert (ENG)	12,883	0	12,883
23	Ju Reti (CHN)	0	12,200	12,200
24	Ryan Day (WAL)	10,950	600	11,550
25	Scott Donaldson (SCO)	6,699	4,700	11,399
26	Michael Holt (ENG)	6,215	5,000	11,215
27	Jimmy Robertson (ENG)	10,516	200	10,716
28	Mark Davis (ENG)	10,450	200	10,650
29	Anthony Hamilton (ENG)	10,234	0	10,234
30	Barry Hawkins (ENG)	9,683	0	9,683
31	Yu Delu (CHN)	1,600	4,400	6,000
32	Lyu Haotian (CHN)	0	5,600	5,600

== Main draw ==
Last 32; Best of 7 frames
1	Mark Allen (NIR)	4
19	Jamie Jones (WAL)	2
12	Fergal O'Brien (IRL)	4
26	Michael Holt (ENG)	3
13	Sam Baird (ENG)	3
29	Anthony Hamilton (ENG)	4
7	Ricky Walden (ENG)	1
18	Gerard Greene (NIR)	4
6	John Higgins (SCO)	4
27	Jimmy Robertson (ENG)	2
9	Ding Junhui (CHN)	3
21	Ben Woollaston (ENG)	4
15	Marco Fu (HKG)	4
20	Gary Wilson (ENG)	0
4	Mark Williams (WAL)	4
32	Lyu Haotian (CHN)	1
3	Ronnie O'Sullivan (ENG)	4
25	Scott Donaldson (SCO)	0
10	Liang Wenbo (CHN)	2
31	Yu Delu (CHN)	4
16	Stephen Maguire (SCO)	0
30	Barry Hawkins (ENG)	4
8	Stuart Bingham (ENG)	3
24	Ryan Day (WAL)	4
5	Shaun Murphy (ENG)	4
17	Neil Robertson (AUS)	2
11	Judd Trump (ENG)	4
23	Ju Reti (CHN)	1
14	Joe Perry (ENG)	4
28	Mark Davis (ENG)	3
2	Mark Selby (ENG)	0
22	David Gilbert (ENG)	4

Last 16; Best of 7 frames
1	(Northern Ireland) Mark Allen	4
12	(Republic of Ireland) Fergal O'Brien	1
29	(England) Anthony Hamilton	3
18	(Northern Ireland) Gerard Greene	4
6	(Scotland) John Higgins	4
21	(England) Ben Woollaston	2
15	(Hong Kong) Marco Fu	4
4	(Wales) Mark Williams	2
3	(England) Ronnie O'Sullivan	3
31	(China) Yu Delu	4
30	(England) Barry Hawkins	4
24	(Wales) Ryan Day	3
5	(England) Shaun Murphy	0
11	(England) Judd Trump	4
14	(England) Joe Perry	4
22	(England) David Gilbert	1

Quarter-finals; Best of 7 frames
1	(Northern Ireland) Mark Allen	2
18	(Northern Ireland) Gerard Greene	4
6	(Scotland) John Higgins	1
15	(Hong Kong) Marco Fu	4
31	(China) Yu Delu	1
30	(England) Barry Hawkins	4
11	(England) Judd Trump	4
14	(England) Joe Perry	2

Semi-finals; Best of 7 frames
18	(Northern Ireland) Gerard Greene	4
15	(Hong Kong) Marco Fu	2
30	(England) Barry Hawkins	4
11	(England) Judd Trump	1

Final; Best of 7 frames
18	(Northern Ireland) Gerard Greene	0
30	(England) Barry Hawkins	4

== Final ==
Final: Best of 7 frames. Referee: Olivier Marteel. Guild Hall, Preston, England, 29 March 2014.
Gerard Greene (18); Northern Ireland	0–4	Barry Hawkins (30); England
0–119 (117), 0–75 (75), 35–61 (50), 15–62
34	Highest break	117
0	Century breaks	1
0	50+ breaks	3

== Century breaks ==
- 140, 109 – Ronnie O'Sullivan
- 136, 113, 107 – Mark Allen
- 133, 128, 123, 121 – Joe Perry
- 131, 117 – Barry Hawkins
- 130 – Jimmy Robertson
- 126 – Anthony Hamilton
- 121, 102 – Marco Fu
- 111 – John Higgins
- 102 – Yu Delu
