= Lü Chenwei =

Chinese snooker player

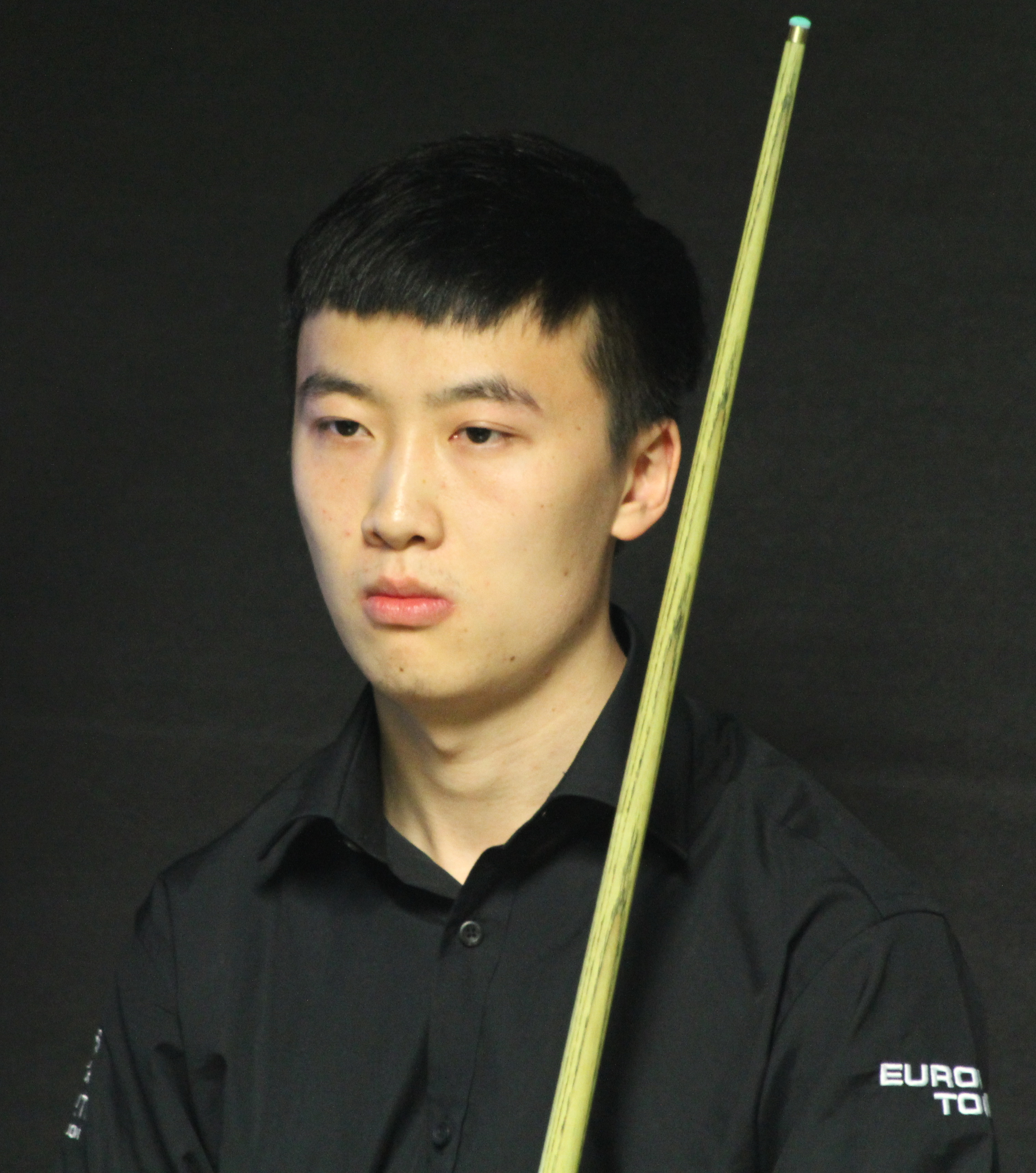
- Paul Hunter Classic 2014

Personal information
- Born: 16 January 1991 (age 35) Taiyuan, Shanxi, China

Sport
- Country: China
- Sport: Snooker
- Professional: 2014–2016
- Highest ranking: 88 (July–August 2015)

Lü Chenwei, also spelled Lyu Chenwei (Chinese: 吕琛玮; born 16 January 1991) is a Chinese former professional snooker player.

== Career ==
Lü appeared in the 2010 China Open as a wildcard aged 19, but lost 5–2 to Robert Milkins. When the Asian Players Tour Championship events were introduced in 2012, it gave Lü an opportunity to qualify for the professional snooker tour. It was in 2013/2014 events where Lü started to make an impact and he reached the semi-finals of the 2013 Zhangjiagang Open, where he lost out to the eventual winner Ju Reti 4–2. This result was the main factor in Lü gaining a tour year place on the professional World Snooker Tour for the 2014–15 and 2015–16 seasons.

=== Debut season ===
Lü won a match as a professional at the first attempt by beating Dominic Dale 5–2 to qualify for the 2014 Wuxi Classic, where he lost 5–2 to Jack Lisowski. He could not win another match in a qualifying event during the rest of the season. He played in his first UK Championship as all tour players start at the venue stage of this event, but was defeated 6–1 by Ryan Day in the first round. Lü was the world number 113 after his first season on tour.

=== 2015/2016 season ===
Lü won one match all season which came at a minor-ranking European Tour event. He did come very close to beating two-time world champion Mark Williams in the opening round of the Welsh Open by levelling at 3–3 from 3–1 down, but could not take advantage of numerous chances that came his way in the decider. He played in Q School to earn a place back on tour and lost twice in the fourth round. Whilst this was not enough it did give him entry to some events as a top-up player due to his Q School Order of Merit ranking.

=== 2016/2017 season ===
He qualified for the Paul Hunter Classic and was whitewashed 4–0 by Thepchaiya Un-Nooh in the opening round. Lü entered Q School but did not get beyond the third round of either event.

== Performance and rankings timeline ==
Tournament	2009/ 10	2012/ 13	2013/ 14	2014/ 15	2015/ 16	2016/ 17	2017/ 18	2018/ 19
Ranking (Note: It shows the ranking at the beginning of the season.)	(Note: He was an amateur.)			(Note: New players on the Main Tour don't have a ranking.)	113			
Ranking tournaments
International Championship	NH	A	A	LQ	LQ	LQ	A	A
UK Championship	A	A	A	1R	1R	A	A	A
German Masters	A	A	A	LQ	LQ	A	A	A
Welsh Open	A	A	A	1R	1R	A	A	A
Indian Open	Not Held		A	LQ	NH	LQ	A	A
Players Championship (Note: The event was called the Players Tour Championship Grand Finals (2012/2013))	NH	DNQ	DNQ	DNQ	DNQ	DNQ	DNQ	DNQ
China Open	WR	A	A	LQ	LQ	A	A	A
World Championship	A	A	A	LQ	LQ	A	A	A
Non-ranking tournaments
Haining Open	Not Held			MR		1R	1R	1R
Former ranking tournaments
Wuxi Classic (Note: The event was called the Jiangsu Classic (2009/2010))	NR	A	A	1R	Tournament Not Held			
Australian Goldfields Open	NH	A	A	LQ	LQ	Tournament Not Held		
Shanghai Masters	A	A	A	LQ	LQ	A	A	NR

Performance Table Legend
LQ	lost in the qualifying draw	#R	lost in the early rounds of the tournament (WR = Wildcard round, RR = Round robin)	QF	lost in the quarter-finals
SF	lost in the semi-finals	F	lost in the final	W	won the tournament
DNQ	did not qualify for the tournament	A	did not participate in the tournament	WD	withdrew from the tournament

NH / Not Held	means an event was not held.
NR / Non-Ranking Event	means an event is/was no longer a ranking event.
R / Ranking Event	means an event is/was a ranking event.
MR / Minor-Ranking Event	means an event is/was a minor-ranking event.
