= 2016 Haining Open =

CBSA Haining International Snooker Open
Tournament information
- Dates: 17–21 October 2016
- Venue: Haining Sports Center
- City: Haining
- Country: China
- Organisation: Chinese Billiards & Snooker Association
- Format: Non-ranking event
- Total prize fund: ¥420,000
- Winner's share: ¥100,000
- Highest break: (China) Jin Long (140)

Final
- Champion: (England) Matthew Selt
- Runner-up: (China) Li Hang
- Score: 5–3

The 2016 CBSA Haining International Snooker Open was a non-ranking snooker tournament that took place from 17 to 21 October 2016 in Haining, China.

Matthew Selt defeated Li Hang 5–3 in the final.

== Prize fund ==
The breakdown of prize money of the event is shown below:

	Prize fund
Winner	¥100,000
Runner-up	¥50,000
Semi-finalist	¥25,000
Quarter-finalist	¥12,000
Last 16	¥6,000
Last 32	¥3,000
Last 64	¥1,500
Highest break	¥8,000
Maximum break	¥20,000
Total	¥420,000

== Main draw ==
=== Top half ===
==== Section 1 ====
Last 128; Best of 7 frames
(China) Zhou Yuelong	3
(China) Chen Feilong	4
(Thailand) Sompol Saetang	4
(China) Ren Zuijie	2
(China) Xie Jintao	3
(China) Ju Reti	4
(China) Wu Dan	0
(China) Fan Zhengyi	4
(England) Jimmy Robertson	2
(Thailand) Suchakree Poomjang	4
(China) Ouyang Sheji	1
(China) Wang Zepeng	4
(China) Ye Guangwei	0
(Hong Kong) Andy Lee	4
(England) Peter McCullagh	1
(China) Ma Bin	4

Last 64; Best of 7 frames
(China) Chen Feilong	4
(Thailand) Sompol Saetang	3
(China) Ju Reti	4
(China) Fan Zhengyi	1
(Thailand) Suchakree Poomjang	4
(China) Wang Zepeng	3
(Hong Kong) Andy Lee	4
(China) Ma Bin	2

Last 32; Best of 7 frames
(China) Chen Feilong	1
(China) Ju Reti	4
(Thailand) Suchakree Poomjang	4
(Hong Kong) Andy Lee	1

Last 16; Best of 7 frames
(China) Ju Reti	4
(Thailand) Suchakree Poomjang	1

==== Section 2 ====
Last 128; Best of 7 frames
(China) Chen Zifan	4
(China) Bo Junjie	1
(China) Wu Zhe	4
(Russia) Ivan Kakovsky	1
(China) Hao Jian	0
(China) Yang Jiaxin	4
(China) Mei Xiwen	2
(England) Sean O'Sullivan	4
(England) Matthew Selt	4
(China) Wang Haowei	1
(China) Li Yan	3
(China) Zhou Jun	4
(Singapore) Boon Chin Ang	3
(Australia) Ryan Thomerson	4
(China) Bai Yun	0
(China) Lyu Haotian	4

Last 64; Best of 7 frames
(China) Chen Zifan	3
(China) Wu Zhe	4
(China) Yang Jiaxin	0
(England) Sean O'Sullivan	4
(England) Matthew Selt	4
(China) Zhou Jun	1
(Australia) Ryan Thomerson	0
(China) Lyu Haotian	4

Last 32; Best of 7 frames
(China) Wu Zhe	0
(England) Sean O'Sullivan	4
(England) Matthew Selt	4
(China) Lyu Haotian	1

Last 16; Best of 7 frames
(England) Sean O'Sullivan	2
(England) Matthew Selt	4

==== Section 3 ====
Last 128; Best of 7 frames
(China) Niu Zhuang	4
(China) Wang Heng	2
(Singapore) Chan Keng	4
(China) Si Majun	0
(Wales) Jamie Clarke	4
(China) He Wenchong	1
(China) Yuan Sijun	2
(England) Martin O'Donnell	4
(Scotland) Eden Sharav	4
(China) Xi Zhengbing	2
(China) Kong Ning	1
(China) Jin Long	4
(China) Yao Pengcheng	4
(China) Huang Zishun	2
(China) Cai Jianzhong	3
(China) Wang Yuchen	4

Last 64; Best of 7 frames
(China) Niu Zhuang	4
(Singapore) Chan Keng	1
(Wales) Jamie Clarke	1
(England) Martin O'Donnell	4
(Scotland) Eden Sharav	4
(China) Jin Long	1
(China) Yao Pengcheng	3
(China) Wang Yuchen	4

Last 32; Best of 7 frames
(China) Niu Zhuang	4
(England) Martin O'Donnell	1
(Scotland) Eden Sharav	4
(China) Wang Yuchen	0

Last 16; Best of 7 frames
(China) Niu Zhuang	2
(Scotland) Eden Sharav	4

==== Section 4 ====
Last 128; Best of 7 frames
(China) Xu Si	3
(China) Bai Langning	4
(China) Guan Zhen	4
(China) Cai Yifan	0
(China) Zhang Zihao	4
(China) Liang Xiao Long	1
(China) Wu Zhengguang	1
(England) Martin Gould	4
(Norway) Kurt Maflin	4
(China) Qi Guoxiao	3
(China) Chen Junhao	4
(China) Yang Guanjun	1
(China) Huang Jiahao	4
(Singapore) Ong Jia Jun	3
(China) Duan Yanfeng	1
(China) Tian Pengfei	4

Last 64; Best of 7 frames
(China) Bai Langning	4
(China) Guan Zhen	3
(China) Zhang Zihao	1
(England) Martin Gould	4
(Norway) Kurt Maflin	4
(China) Chen Junhao	2
(China) Huang Jiahao	4
(China) Tian Pengfei	3

Last 32; Best of 7 frames
(China) Bai Langning	0
(England) Martin Gould	4
(Norway) Kurt Maflin	3
(China) Huang Jiahao	4

Last 16; Best of 7 frames
(England) Martin Gould	4
(China) Huang Jiahao	3

=== Bottom half ===
==== Section 5 ====
Last 128; Best of 7 frames
(China) Li Hang	4
(China) Pan Weixing	3
(China) Wang Chenkai	2
(China) Li Yindong	4
(China) Pang Junxu	4
(China) Ren Jiaxing	3
(China) Deng Jinhong	1
(England) David Grace	4
(Scotland) Ross Muir	4
(China) Wu Zhefan	0
(China) Shen Zhe	0
(China) Shen Haoran	4
(China) Geng Mingqi	2
(China) Song Yang	4
(China) Chang Bingyu	2
(China) Rouzi Maimaiti	4

Last 64; Best of 7 frames
(China) Li Hang	4
(China) Li Yindong	1
(China) Pang Junxu	4
(England) David Grace	3
(Scotland) Ross Muir	4
(China) Shen Haoran	1
(China) Song Yang	3
(China) Rouzi Maimaiti	4

Last 32; Best of 7 frames
(China) Li Hang	4
(China) Pang Junxu	2
(Scotland) Ross Muir	1
(China) Rouzi Maimaiti	4

Last 16; Best of 7 frames
(China) Li Hang	4
(China) Rouzi Maimaiti	2

==== Section 6 ====
Last 128; Best of 7 frames
(China) Lu Ning	4
(China) Long Zehuang	1
(China) Ma Tingpeng	4
(China) Paruke Aierken	2
(China) Li Yuan	4
(China) Cheng Sihong	1
(China) Li Zhen	4
(England) Paul Davison	1
(Wales) Jak Jones	4
(China) Wang Peng	2
(China) Zhao Hanyang	4
(China) Yin Xiaowei	2
(China) Gu Hongjie	1
(China) Zhong Lin	4
(China) Wang Haonan	0
(China) Xiao Guodong	4

Last 64; Best of 7 frames
(China) Lu Ning	4
(China) Ma Tingpeng	1
(China) Li Yuan	4
(China) Li Zhen	2
(Wales) Jak Jones	4
(China) Zhao Hanyang	0
(China) Zhong Lin	0
(China) Xiao Guodong	4

Last 32; Best of 7 frames
(China) Lu Ning	2
(China) Li Yuan	4
(Wales) Jak Jones	4
(China) Xiao Guodong	2

Last 16; Best of 7 frames
(China) Li Yuan	3
(Wales) Jak Jones	4

==== Section 7 ====
Last 128; Best of 7 frames
(China) Yu Delu	4
(China) Cao Yupeng	2
(China) Luo Honghao	4
(China) Lei Peifan	0
(China) Chen Feng	4
(China) Li Yujin	1
(China) Si Jiahui	1
(England) Mark King	4
(Thailand) Noppon Saengkham	4
(China) Zhang Jiankang	1
(China) Chen Ruifu	3
(China) Tu Taojin	4
(China) Qin Jianfeng	3
(China) Tang Jun	4
(Singapore) Lim Chun Kiat	1
(China) Hu Hao	4

Last 64; Best of 7 frames
(China) Yu Delu	1
(China) Luo Honghao	4
(China) Chen Feng	0
(England) Mark King	4
(Thailand) Noppon Saengkham	4
(China) Tu Taojin	0
(China) Tang Jun	4
(China) Hu Hao	3

Last 32; Best of 7 frames
(China) Luo Honghao	0
(England) Mark King	4
(Thailand) Noppon Saengkham	4
(China) Tang Jun	2

Last 16; Best of 7 frames
(England) Mark King	4
(Thailand) Noppon Saengkham	3

==== Section 8 ====
Last 128; Best of 7 frames
(China) Chen Zhe	4
(Singapore) Loh Siang Leng	0
(China) Zhang Yong	4
(China) Lü Chenwei	1
(China) Mao Hua	1
(China) Peng Yisong	4
(China) Yang Bingkun	0
(England) Tom Ford	4
(England) Craig Steadman	4
(China) Yang Haifeng	0
(China) Zhang Zhijie	4
(China) Liu Jiaming	3
(China) Feng Zeyuan	4
(China) He Guoqiang	3
(China) Gu Xiaoming	1
(China) Zhang Anda	4

Last 64; Best of 7 frames
(China) Chen Zhe	0
(China) Zhang Yong	4
(China) Peng Yisong	1
(England) Tom Ford	4
(England) Craig Steadman	4
(China) Zhang Zhijie	2
(China) Feng Zeyuan	2
(China) Zhang Anda	4

Last 32; Best of 7 frames
(China) Zhang Yong	1
(England) Tom Ford	4
(England) Craig Steadman	2
(China) Zhang Anda	4

Last 16; Best of 7 frames
(England) Tom Ford	2
(China) Zhang Anda	4

=== Finals ===
Quarter-finals; Best of 7 frames
(China) Ju Reti	2
(England) Matthew Selt	4
(Scotland) Eden Sharav	3
(England) Martin Gould	4
(China) Li Hang	4
(Wales) Jak Jones	3
(England) Mark King	3
(China) Zhang Anda	4

Semi-finals; Best of 7 frames
(England) Matthew Selt	4
(England) Martin Gould	3
(China) Li Hang	4
(China) Zhang Anda	3

Final; Best of 9 frames
(England) Matthew Selt	5
(China) Li Hang	3
