= Rouzi Maimaiti =

Chinese professional snooker player

Personal information
- Born: 4 July 1983 (age 43) Korla, Xinjiang, China

Sport
- Country: China
- Sport: Snooker
- Professional: 2014–2017
- Highest ranking: 92 (July–August 2015)
- Best ranking finish: Last 32 (x1)

Rouzi Maimaiti (Uyghur: روزا مەمەت, romanized: Roza Memet; Chinese: 肉孜买买提; born 4 July 1983) is a Chinese former professional snooker player.

== Career ==
Maimaiti has been a wildcard player at several ranking tournaments before turning professional. He lost the majority of the matches except a 5–1 over Dave Harold in the 2012 Wuxi Classic, before suffering a reverse to Mark Allen in the last 32 stage. Also in the 2012–13 season, Maimaiti entered into the new Asian Players Tour Championship events with little success, winning only one match The 2013/2014 events were much more successful and with eight wins in the four events Maimaiti was able to qualify for one of the four professional World Snooker Tour cards available through the Asian Tour of Merit money list. Maimaiti qualified for the 2014–15 and 2015–16 seasons and then re-qualified for the 2016–17 and 2017–18 seasons.

=== Professional ===
Rouzi only played in the three Asian Tour events during the 2014–15 season. He won four matches to reach the quarter-finals of the Xuzhou Open, where he lost 4–1 to Joe Perry which saw him finish 25th on the Order of Merit. The following season he only played in the Haining Open, losing 4–1 to Tom Ford in the second round. Despite dropping off the tour having finished a lowly 115th in the world, he received the Chinese nomination for a new two-year tour place. He did not enter a single event in the 2016–17 season.

== Performance and rankings timeline ==
Tournament	2010/ 11	2011/ 12	2012/ 13	2013/ 14	2014/ 15	2015/ 16	2016/ 17	2017/ 18	2018/ 19	2019/ 20
Ranking (Note: It shows the ranking at the beginning of the season.)	(Note: He was an amateur.)				(Note: New players don't have a ranking.)	118	(Note: Players qualified through CBSA China Tour nomination started the season without ranking points.)			
Ranking tournaments
World Open	A	WR	A	A	Not held		A	A	A	A
Players Championship (Note: The event was called the Players Tour Championship Grand Finals (2010/2011–2012/2013))	DNQ	DNQ	DNQ	DNQ	DNQ	DNQ	DNQ	DNQ	DNQ	DNQ
China Open	WR	A	A	A	A	A	A	A	A	A
Non-ranking tournaments
Haining Open	Tournament Not Held				MR		4R	2R	2R	1R
Former ranking tournaments
Wuxi Classic	Non Ranking		1R	A	A	Tournament Not Held				
Shanghai Masters	WR	WR	A	A	A	A	A	A	Non-Ranking	
Former non-ranking tournaments
Wuxi Classic	A	1R	Ranking			Tournament Not Held				

Performance Table Legend
LQ	lost in the qualifying draw	#R	lost in the early rounds of the tournament (WR = Wildcard round, RR = Round robin)	QF	lost in the quarter-finals
SF	lost in the semi-finals	F	lost in the final	W	won the tournament
DNQ	did not qualify for the tournament	A	did not participate in the tournament	WD	withdrew from the tournament

NH / Not Held	means an event was not held.
NR / Non-Ranking Event	means an event is/was no longer a ranking event.
R / Ranking Event	means an event is/was a ranking event.
MR / Minor-Ranking Event	means an event is/was a minor-ranking event.
