= Players Tour Championship 2013/2014 =

The Players Tour Championship 2013/2014 was a series of snooker tournaments which started on 6 June 2013 and ended on 29 March 2014, with events held across Europe and Asia. In this season the European events formed the European Tour and events held in Asia the Asian Tour. The twelve regular minor-ranking events concluded with the Finals.

== Schedule ==
Date (Note: Dates use the month day format)			Tournament Name	Venue	City	Winner	Runner–up	Score	References
06–06	06–09	BUL	European Tour – Event 1 (Note: Event also known as the 2013 Bulgarian Open.)	Universiada Hall	Sofia	(Scotland) John Higgins	(Australia) Neil Robertson	4–1	
06–11	06–15	CHN	Asian Tour – Event 1 (Note: Event also known as the 2013 Yixing Open.)	Yixing Sports Centre	Yixing	(England) Joe Perry	(England) Mark Selby	4–1	
07–18	07–21	NLD	European Tour – Event 2 (Note: Event also known as the 2013 Rotterdam Open.)	Topsport Centrum	Rotterdam	(Wales) Mark Williams	(England) Mark Selby	4–3	
08–14	08–17	ENG	European Tour – Event 3 (Note: Event also known as the 2013 Bluebell Wood Open.)	Doncaster Dome	Doncaster	(England) Ricky Walden	(Hong Kong) Marco Fu	4–3	
08–22	08–25	GER	European Tour – Event 4 (Note: Event also known as the 2013 Paul Hunter Classic.)	Stadthalle	Fürth	(England) Ronnie O'Sullivan	(Northern Ireland) Gerard Greene	4–0	
09–23	09–27	CHN	Asian Tour – Event 2 (Note: Event also known as the 2013 Zhangjiagang Open.)	Zhangjiagang Sports Center	Zhangjiagang	(China) Ju Reti	(England) Michael Holt	4–1	
10–03	10–06	GER	European Tour – Event 5 (Note: Event also known as the 2013 Ruhr Open.)	RWE-Sporthalle	Mülheim	(Northern Ireland) Mark Allen	(China) Ding Junhui	4–1	
10–20	10–24	CHN	Asian Tour – Event 3 (Note: Event also known as the 2013 Zhengzhou Open.)	Guanhua Grand Hotel	Zhengzhou	(China) Liang Wenbo	(China) Lyu Haotian	4–0	
11–07	11–10	ENG	European Tour – Event 6 (Note: Event also known as the 2013 Kay Suzanne Memorial Cup.)	The Capital Venue	Gloucester	(Northern Ireland) Mark Allen	(England) Judd Trump	4–1	
11–14	11–17	BEL	European Tour – Event 7 (Note: Event also known as the 2013 Antwerp Open.)	Lotto Arena	Antwerp	(England) Mark Selby	(England) Ronnie O'Sullivan	4–3	
02–06	02–09	POL	European Tour – Event 8 (Note: Event also known as the 2014 Gdynia Open.)	Gdynia Sports Arena	Gdynia	(England) Shaun Murphy	(Republic of Ireland) Fergal O'Brien	4–1	
03–04	03–08	CHN	Asian Tour – Event 4 (Note: Event also known as the 2014 Dongguan Open.)	Dongguan Dongcheng Sports Garden	Dongguan	(England) Stuart Bingham	(China) Liang Wenbo	4–1	
03–25	03–29	ENG	Players Tour Championship – Finals (Note: Event also known as the 2014 Players Championship Grand Final.)	Guild Hall	Preston	(England) Barry Hawkins	(Northern Ireland) Gerard Greene	4–0	

== Order of Merit ==
=== European Tour ===
The calculation method of the European Tour Order of Merit was changed this season. The previously used £1=€1 system was changed to accommodate the increasing prize money of the continental European events. World Snooker decided to use the £1=€1.2 conversation rate.

Player qualified for the Finals through the Asian Tour Order of Merit

After 8 out of 8 events:

Rank	Player	Total Points	Events Played
1	(Northern Ireland) Mark Allen	45,250	5
2	(England) Ronnie O'Sullivan	38,616	6
3	(England) Mark Selby	37,516	5
4	(Wales) Mark Willams	30,683	7
5	(England) Shaun Murphy	29,499	7
6	(Scotland) John Higgins	26,350	7
7	(England) Ricky Walden	25,100	6
8	(England) Judd Trump	20,249	8
9	(China) Ding Junhui	18,333	4
10	(Republic of Ireland) Fergal O'Brien	17,199	8
11	(England) Sam Baird	16,351	8
12	(Hong Kong) Marco Fu	15,100	6
13	(Scotland) Stephen Maguire	14,766	6
14	(Australia) Neil Robertson	14,083	6
15	(Wales) Jamie Jones	13,100	8
16	(England) David Gilbert	12,883	8
17	(England) Stuart Bingham	12,783	7
18	(Northern Ireland) Gerard Greene	12,783	8
19	(Wales) Ryan Day	10,950	8
20	(England) Jimmy Robertson	10,516	7
21	(England) Ben Woollaston	10,516	8
22	(England) Mark Davis	10,450	8
23	(England) Anthony Hamilton	10,234	8
24	(England) Gary Wilson	10,032	8
25	(England) Barry Hawkins	9,683	7

(Top 25 players out of 515)

=== Asian Tour ===
Player qualified for the Finals through the European Tour Order of Merit

After 4 out of 4 events:

Rank	Player	Total Points	Events Played
1	(China) Liang Wenbo	17,700	4
2	(China) Ju Reti	12,200	4
3	(England) Stuart Bingham	10,200	2
4	(England) Joe Perry	10,000	1
5	(China) Lyu Haotian	5,600	3
6	(England) Mark Selby	5,200	2
7	(England) Michael Holt	5,000	2
8	(Scotland) Scott Donaldson	4,700	4
9	(China) Yu Delu	4,400	4

(Top 9 players out of 202)

== Finals ==
The Finals of the Players Tour Championship 2013/2014 took place between 25–29 March 2014 at the Guild Hall in Preston, England. It was contested by the top 24 players on the European Tour Order of Merit, and the top eight from the Asian Tour Order of Merit. If a player qualified from both Order of Merits, then the highest position counted and the next player on the other list qualified. If a player finished on both lists on the same place, then the European Tour Order of Merit took precedence and the next player from the Asian Tour Order of Merit qualified. The seeding list of the Finals was based on the combined list from the earnings of both Order of Merits.

Final: Best of 7 frames. Referee: Olivier Marteel. Guild Hall, Preston, England, 29 March 2014.
Gerard Greene (18); Northern Ireland	0–4	Barry Hawkins (30); England
0–119 (117), 0–75 (75), 35–61 (50), 15–62
34	Highest break	117
0	Century breaks	1
0	50+ breaks	3
