= Ju Reti =

Chinese snooker player (born 1983)

Personal information
- Born: 19 September 1983 (age 43) Bortala, Xinjiang, China

Sport
- Country: China
- Sport: Snooker
- Professional: 2014–2016
- Highest ranking: 93 (July 2015)
- Best ranking finish: Last 32 (x1)

Tournament wins
- Minor-ranking: 1

Ju Reti (Chinese: 居热提; Uyghur: بارى مەمتىلى, romanized: Jür'et Abdurëhim; born 19 September 1983) is a Chinese former professional snooker player.

== Career ==
=== Amateur ===
==== 2012/2013 ====
Ju, a farmer, from the Xinjiang region China of the Uyghur ethnic group started to enter Asian Players Tour Championship when they were introduced in the 2012/2013 season, entering in Event 2, where he lost to Mark Williams in the last 64 and Event 3 where he reached the last 16 stage as he lost to Li Hang, over these two events Ju won four matches and won £1,500 in prize money as he was ranked 37th in the Asian Order of Merit.

==== 2013/2014 ====
The following season, Ju entered in all four of the Asian Tour Events in the 2013/2014 season, reaching the last 32 of the 2013 Yixing Open, where he also scored his first century break. In the 2013 Zhangjiagang Open, Ju managed to reach the final where he faced Michael Holt and Ju became the first amateur winner of a Player Tour Event, after a 4–1 win over Holt, he won £10,000 in prize money and made the highest break of the tournament with 142. In the final two Asian Events of the season, Ju reached the last 32 of the 2013 Zhengzhou Open and the last 16 of the 2014 Dongguan Open, these results netted Ju £12,200 in prize money and was ranked 2nd in the Asian Order of Merit which gained him qualification the 2014 Players Championship Grand Finals and a two-year card of the professional snooker tour for the 2014–15 and 2015–16 seasons. At the Players Championship Grand Finals, Ju took the first frame against Judd Trump with a break of 75 in the last 32 stage, but lost 4–1 at the event held at Preston's Guild Hall.

=== Professional ===
Ju only played in the three Asian Tour events in the 2014–15 season. A pair of last 32 exits saw him finish 30th on the Order of Merit. He only played in the Haining Open the following year, losing 4–0 in the first round, and has now dropped off the tour.

== Performance and rankings timeline ==
Tournament	2012/ 13	2013/ 14	2014/ 15	2016/ 17	2017/ 18	2018/ 19	2019/ 20
Ranking (Note: It shows the ranking at the beginning of the season.)	(Note: He was an amateur.)		(Note: New players on the Main Tour don't have a ranking.)				
Ranking tournaments
Players Championship Grand Final (Note: The event was called the Players Tour Championship Grand Finals (2012/2013))	DNQ	1R	DNQ	DNQ	DNQ	DNQ	DNQ
Non-ranking tournaments
Haining Open	Not Held		MR	QF	1R	QF	2R

Performance Table Legend
LQ	lost in the qualifying draw	#R	lost in the early rounds of the tournament (WR = Wildcard round, RR = Round robin)	QF	lost in the quarter-finals
SF	lost in the semi-finals	F	lost in the final	W	won the tournament
DNQ	did not qualify for the tournament	A	did not participate in the tournament	WD	withdrew from the tournament

NH / Not held	means an event was not held.
MR / Minor-ranking event	means an event is/was a minor-ranking event.
NR / Non-ranking event	means an event is/was no longer a ranking event.
R / Ranking event	means an event is/was now a ranking event

== Career finals ==
=== Minor-ranking finals: 1 (1 title) ===
Outcome	No.	Year	Championship	Opponent in the final	Score	Ref.
Winner	1.	2013	Zhangjiagang Open	(England) Michael Holt	4–1	
