= Li Yuan (snooker player) =

Chinese snooker player

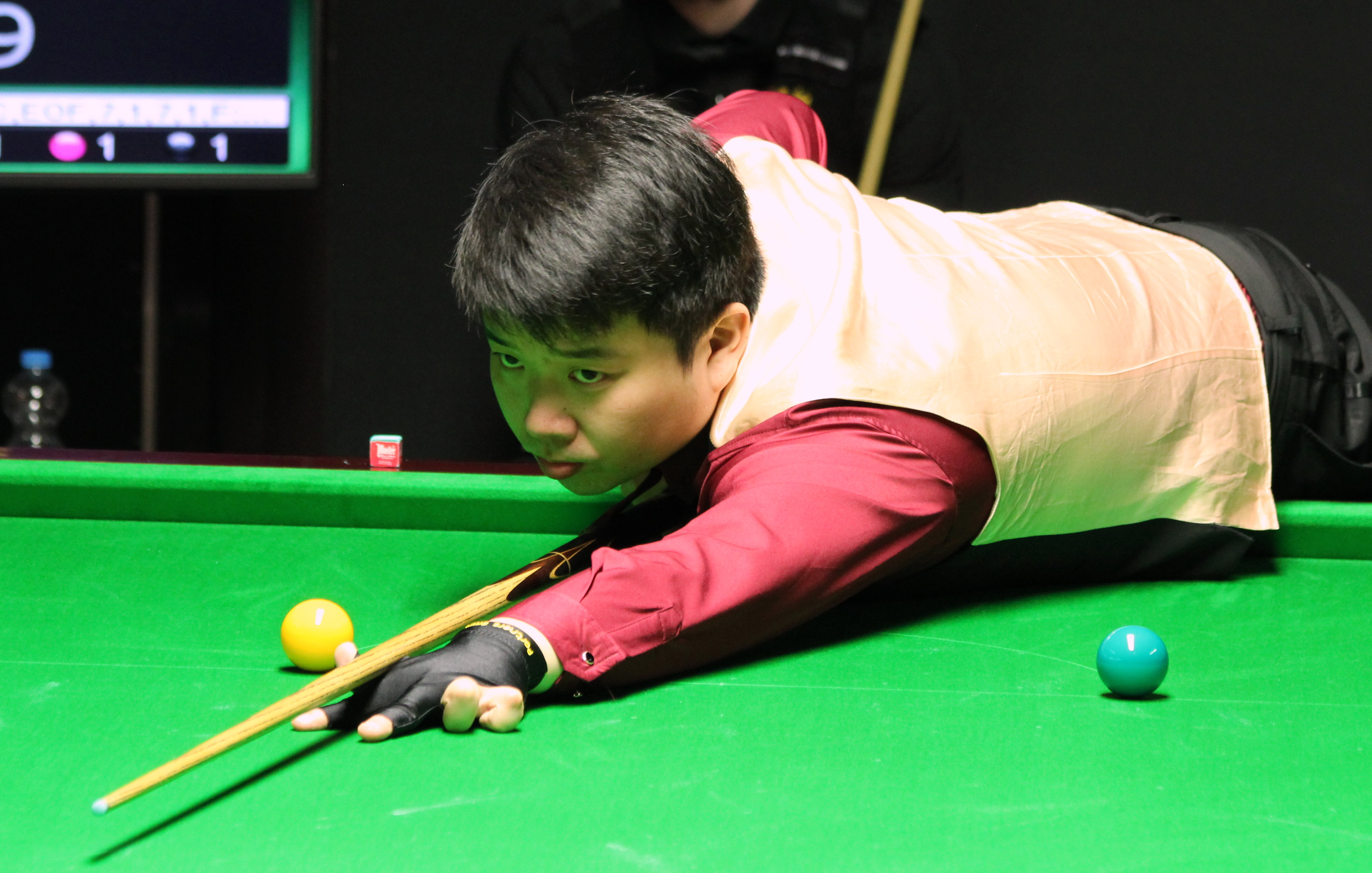
- Paul Hunter Classic 2017

Personal information
- Born: 20 October 1989 (age 36) Beijing, China

Sport
- Country: China
- Sport: Snooker
- Professional: 2017–2019
- Highest ranking: 77 (August 2018)
- Best ranking finish: Quarter-final (x1)

Li Yuan (Chinese: 李远; born 20 October 1989) is a Chinese former professional snooker player.

== Career ==
Li had previously appeared as a wildcard at several ranking tournaments, such as the 2008 China Open where he pushed Marco Fu to a deciding frame, narrowly losing 5–4. The following season he appeared at the 2008 Shanghai Masters where he lost 5–1 to Andy Hicks. He then played in several Asian Tour Events, reaching the last 16 on two occasions, before appearing at the 2017 China Open wildcard round where he was defeated by 5–1 by Jimmy White.

Li turned professional in 2017, after being nominated as one of the two players from the CBSA China Snooker Tour.

== Performance and rankings timeline ==
Tournament	2007/ 08	2008/ 09	2012/ 13	2013/ 14	2014/ 15	2015/ 16	2016/ 17	2017/ 18	2018/ 19
Ranking (Note: It shows the ranking at the beginning of the season.)	(Note: He was an amateur.)							(Note: New players on the Main Tour don't have a ranking.)	77
Ranking tournaments
Riga Masters	Tournament Not Held				MR		A	WD	1R
World Open	A	A	A	A	Not Held		A	LQ	LQ
Paul Hunter Classic	Pro-Am		Minor-Ranking Event				A	1R	A
China Championship	Tournament Not Held						NR	WD	LQ
European Masters	Tournament Not Held						A	1R	LQ
English Open	Tournament Not Held						A	2R	1R
International Championship	Not Held		A	A	A	A	A	1R	LQ
Northern Ireland Open	Tournament Not Held						A	QF	1R
UK Championship	A	A	A	A	A	A	A	1R	1R
Scottish Open	Not Held		MR	Not Held			A	1R	1R
German Masters	Not Held		A	A	A	A	A	LQ	LQ
World Grand Prix	Tournament Not Held				NR	DNQ	DNQ	DNQ	DNQ
Welsh Open	A	A	A	A	A	A	A	1R	1R
Shoot-Out	Not Held		Non-Ranking Event				A	1R	1R
Indian Open	Tournament Not Held			A	A	NH	A	LQ	1R
Players Championship	Not Held		DNQ	DNQ	DNQ	DNQ	DNQ	DNQ	DNQ
Gibraltar Open	Tournament Not Held					MR	A	1R	A
Tour Championship	Tournament Not Held								DNQ
China Open	WR	A	A	A	A	A	WR	LQ	LQ
World Championship	A	A	A	A	A	A	A	LQ	A
Non-ranking tournaments
Haining Open	Tournament Not Held				MR		4R	4R	4R
Former ranking tournaments
Shanghai Masters	A	WR	A	A	A	A	A	1R	NR

Performance Table Legend
LQ	lost in the qualifying draw	#R	lost in the early rounds of the tournament (WR = Wildcard round, RR = Round robin)	QF	lost in the quarter-finals
SF	lost in the semi-finals	F	lost in the final	W	won the tournament
DNQ	did not qualify for the tournament	A	did not participate in the tournament	WD	withdrew from the tournament

NH / Not Held	means an event was not held.
NR / Non-Ranking Event	means an event is/was no longer a ranking event.
R / Ranking Event	means an event is/was a ranking event.
MR / Minor-Ranking Event	means an event is/was a minor-ranking event.

== Career finals ==
=== Amateur finals: 1 ===
Outcome	No.	Year	Championship	Opponent in the final	Score
Runner-up	1.	2008	ACBS Asian Under-21 Championship	(China) Li Hang	1–6
