= Chen Feilong =

Chinese snooker player

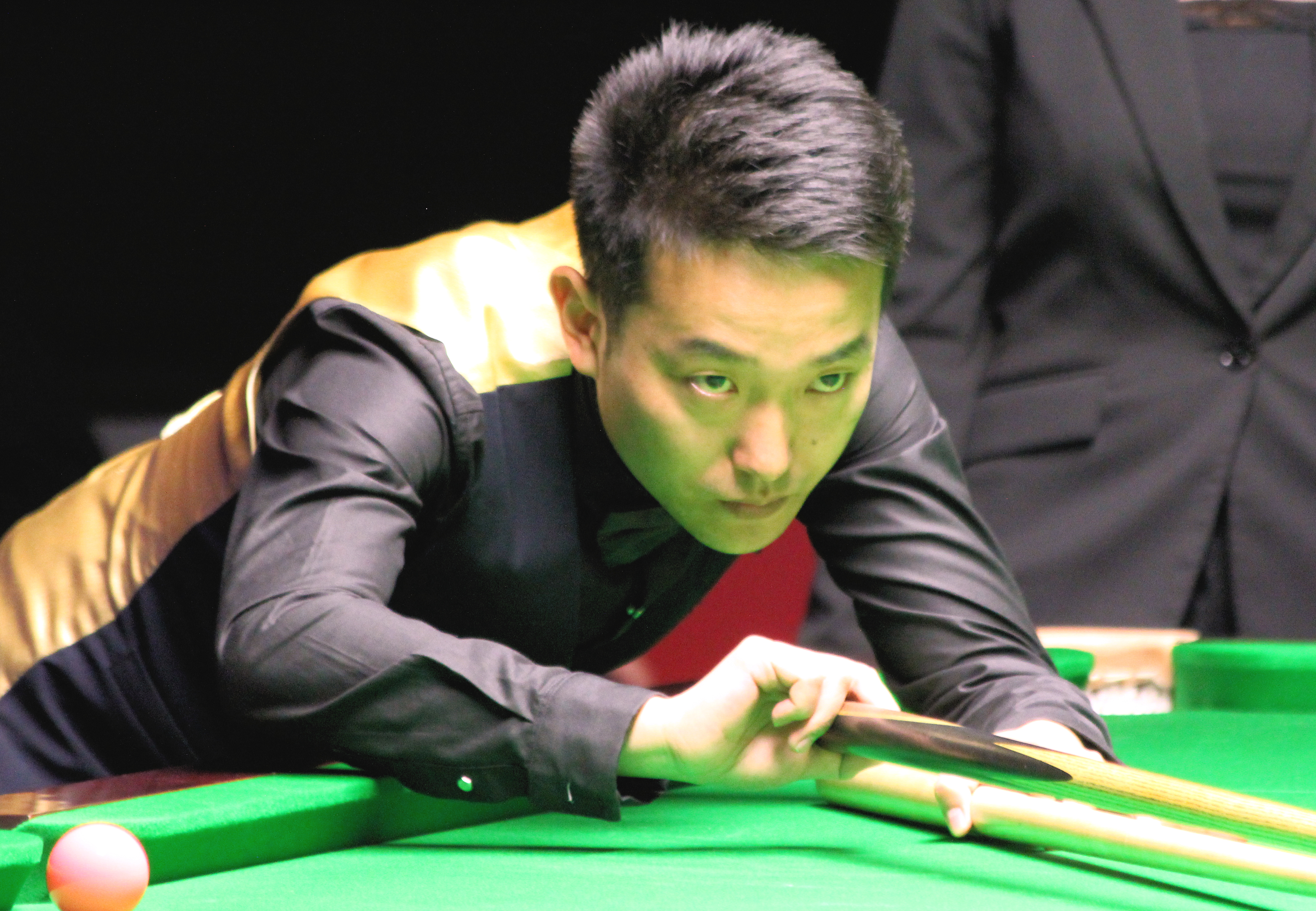
- Paul Hunter Classic 2018

Personal information
- Born: 4 September 1982 (age 44) Yibin, Sichuan, China

Sport
- Country: China
- Sport: Snooker
- Professional: 2018–2020
- Highest ranking: 86 (June 2019)
- Best ranking finish: Last 32 (x1)

Chen Feilong
- Traditional Chinese: 陳飛龍
- Simplified Chinese: 陈飞龙
Transcriptions
Standard Mandarin
- Hanyu Pinyin: Chén Fēilóng
Yue: Cantonese
- Yale Romanization: Chàhn Fēi Lùhng
- Jyutping: Can⁴ Fei¹ Lung⁴

Chen Feilong (Chinese: 陈飞龙; born 4 September 1982) is a former professional Chinese snooker player, playing on the World Snooker Tour from the 2018–19 season.

== Career ==
He has been awarded a two-year professional tour card following his performances on the CBSA China Tour. Ahead of the 2018–19 season, he had been announced as being based at Q House Snooker Academy in Darlington as a resident professional.

At the 2018 Northern Ireland Open, Chen picked up his first tournament match win, defeating Marco Fu 4–2; before losing to Martin O'Donnell in the second round. On 28 November 2018, Chen defeated former World Champion Shaun Murphy 6–3 in the first round at the 2018 UK Championship.

== Performance and rankings timeline ==
Tournament	2011/ 12	2012/ 13	2013/ 14	2014/ 15	2015/ 16	2016/ 17	2017/ 18	2018/ 19	2019/ 20
Ranking (Note: It shows the ranking at the beginning of the season.)	(Note: He was an amateur.)							(Note: New players on the Main Tour don't have a ranking.)	86
Ranking tournaments
Riga Masters (Note: The event was called the Riga Open (2014/2015–2015/2016))	Not Held			Minor-Rank.		A	A	LQ	WD
International Championship	NH	WR	A	A	A	A	A	LQ	LQ
China Championship	Tournament Not Held					NR	A	LQ	LQ
English Open	Tournament Not Held					A	A	1R	2R
World Open	A	A	A	Not Held		A	A	LQ	LQ
Northern Ireland Open	Tournament Not Held					A	A	2R	2R
UK Championship	A	A	A	A	A	A	A	2R	1R
Scottish Open	NH	MR	Not Held			A	A	2R	1R
European Masters	Tournament Not Held					A	A	LQ	LQ
German Masters	A	A	A	A	A	A	A	LQ	LQ
World Grand Prix	Not Held			NR	DNQ	DNQ	DNQ	DNQ	DNQ
Welsh Open	A	A	A	A	A	A	A	1R	2R
Shoot-Out	Variant Format Event					A	A	2R	2R
Players Championship (Note: The event was called the Players Tour Championship Grand Finals (2010/2011–2012/2013))	DNQ	DNQ	DNQ	DNQ	DNQ	DNQ	DNQ	DNQ	DNQ
Gibraltar Open	Tournament Not Held				MR	A	A	1R	1R
Tour Championship	Tournament Not Held							DNQ	DNQ
World Championship	A	A	A	A	A	A	A	LQ	LQ
Non-ranking tournaments
Haining Open	Not Held			MR		3R	3R	A	A
Former ranking tournaments
Wuxi Classic	NR	WR	A	A	Tournament Not Held				
Shanghai Masters	A	1R	A	A	A	A	LQ	Non-Rank.	
Paul Hunter Classic	Minor-Ranking					A	A	1R	NR
Indian Open	Not Held		A	A	NH	A	A	LQ	NH
China Open	WR	A	A	A	A	A	LQ	LQ	NH

Performance Table Legend
LQ	lost in the qualifying draw	#R	lost in the early rounds of the tournament (WR = Wildcard round, RR = Round robin)	QF	lost in the quarter-finals
SF	lost in the semi-finals	F	lost in the final	W	won the tournament
DNQ	did not qualify for the tournament	A	did not participate in the tournament	WD	withdrew from the tournament

NH / Not Held	means an event was not held.
NR / Non-Ranking Event	means an event is/was no longer a ranking event.
R / Ranking Event	means an event is/was a ranking event.
MR / Minor-Ranking Event	means an event is/was a minor-ranking event.
