= Haining Open =

Chinese snooker tournament

Tournament information
- Location: Haining
- Country: China
- Established: 2014
- Organisation(s): CBSA (2016–2023); WPBSA (2014–2015)
- Format: Non-ranking event
- Final year: 2023

The Haining Open was a non-ranking snooker tournament. It was a minor-ranking part of the Players Tour Championship until 2015.

== History ==
The tournament started in 2014 and was staged at the Haining Sports Center in Haining, Zhejiang, China. The inaugural tournament was won by Stuart Bingham who defeated fellow countryman Oliver Lines 4–0 in the final. In 2015, Ding Junhui won the tournament.

Matthew Selt was the winner of the now CBSA sanctioned Haining Open tournament in 2016. The event now sanctioned by CBSA wanted to keep the event after the recent demise of the Asian Tour. Thepchaiya Un-Nooh was the 2019 Haining Open champion.

As a result of travel restrictions brought about by the COVID-19 pandemic, the tournament did not run in the 2020–21 season. The 2021-22 edition of the event was played for Chinese players mostly due to the travel restrictions still being in place.

== Winners ==
| Year | Winner | Runner-up | Final score | Season |
Haining Open (Minor-ranking)
| 2014 | (England) Stuart Bingham | (England) Oliver Lines | 4–0 | 2014–15 |
| 2015 | (China) Ding Junhui | (England) Ricky Walden | 4–3 | 2015–16 |
Haining Open (Non-ranking)
| 2016 | (England) Matthew Selt | (China) Li Hang | 5–3 | 2016–17 |
| 2017 | (England) Mark Selby | (England) Tom Ford | 5–1 | 2017–18 |
| 2018 | (England) Mark Selby | (China) Li Hang | 5–4 | 2018–19 |
| 2019 | (Thailand) Thepchaiya Un-Nooh | (China) Li Hang | 5–3 | 2019–20 |
| 2020 | Cancelled due to the COVID-19 pandemic | | | 2020–21 |
| 2021 | (China) He Guoqiang | (China) Huang Jiahao | 5–0 | 2021–22 |
| 2023 | (China) Yuan Sijun | (China) Wu Yize | 5–1 | 2022–23 |

== See also ==
- World Open, a ranking tournament held in nearby Yushan
