= Niu Zhuang =

Chinese snooker player

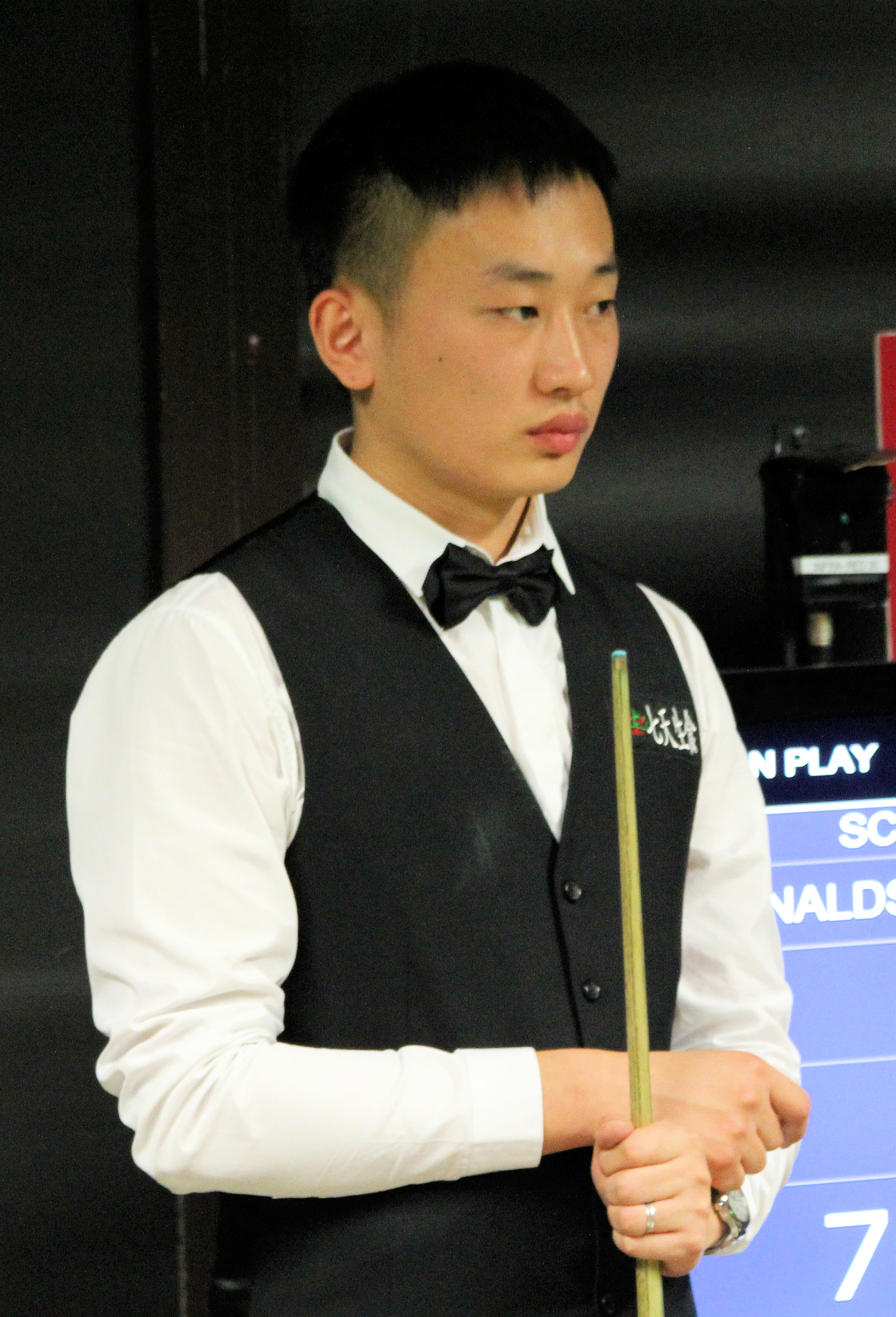
- Paul Hunter Classic 2018

Personal information
- Born: 26 June 1994 (age 32) Fuyang, Anhui, China

Sport
- Country: China
- Sport: Snooker
- Professional: 2017–2019
- Highest ranking: 82 (August 2018)
- Best ranking finish: Last 32 (x1)

Niu Zhuang (Chinese: 牛壮; born 26 June 1994) is a Chinese former professional snooker player.

== Career ==
Niu first received attention in world snooker when he entered APTC Event 2 in 2012, reaching the last 16 and defeating established professionals Mark King (4–0) and future World Champion Stuart Bingham (4–3). He reached the same stage at the 2015 Xuzhou Open where he was defeated by Alfie Burden. His most notable result was defeating Matthew Selt 4–1 in the last 64.

He achieved a two-year world snooker tour card in May 2017 due to his performances on the Chinese professional tour.

== Performance and rankings timeline ==
Tournament	2012/ 13	2013/ 14	2014/ 15	2015/ 16	2016/ 17	2017/ 18	2018/ 19
Ranking (Note: It shows the ranking at the beginning of the season.)	(Note: He was an amateur.)					(Note: New players on the Main Tour don't have a ranking.)	83
Ranking tournaments
Riga Masters	Not Held		MR		A	WD	1R
World Open	A	A	A	NH	A	LQ	LQ
Paul Hunter Classic	Minor-Ranking				A	A	2R
China Championship	Not Held				NR	LQ	LQ
European Masters	Not Held				A	LQ	LQ
English Open	Not Held				A	1R	1R
International Championship	WR	A	A	A	A	1R	LQ
Northern Ireland Open	Not Held				A	2R	2R
UK Championship	A	A	A	A	A	1R	1R
Scottish Open	MR	Not Held			A	2R	1R
German Masters	A	A	A	A	A	1R	LQ
World Grand Prix	Not Held		NR	DNQ	DNQ	DNQ	DNQ
Welsh Open	A	A	A	A	A	1R	1R
Shoot-Out	Non-Ranking Event				A	1R	WD
Indian Open	NH	A	A	NH	A	1R	LQ
Players Championship	DNQ	DNQ	DNQ	DNQ	DNQ	DNQ	DNQ
Gibraltar Open	Not Held			MR	A	2R	A
Tour Championship	Tournament Not Held						DNQ
China Open	A	A	A	WR	1R	LQ	LQ
World Championship	A	A	A	A	LQ	LQ	LQ
Non-ranking tournaments
Haining Open	Not Held		MR		4R	3R	WD
Former ranking tournaments
Wuxi Classic	A	A	WR	Tournament Not Held			
Shanghai Masters	A	A	WR	WR	WR	LQ	NR

Performance Table Legend
LQ	lost in the qualifying draw	#R	lost in the early rounds of the tournament (WR = Wildcard round, RR = Round robin)	QF	lost in the quarter-finals
SF	lost in the semi-finals	F	lost in the final	W	won the tournament
DNQ	did not qualify for the tournament	A	did not participate in the tournament	WD	withdrew from the tournament

NH / Not Held	means an event was not held.
NR / Non-Ranking Event	means an event is/was no longer a ranking event.
R / Ranking Event	means an event is/was a ranking event.
MR / Minor-Ranking Event	means an event is/was a minor-ranking event.
