= Cao Xinlong =

Chinese snooker player

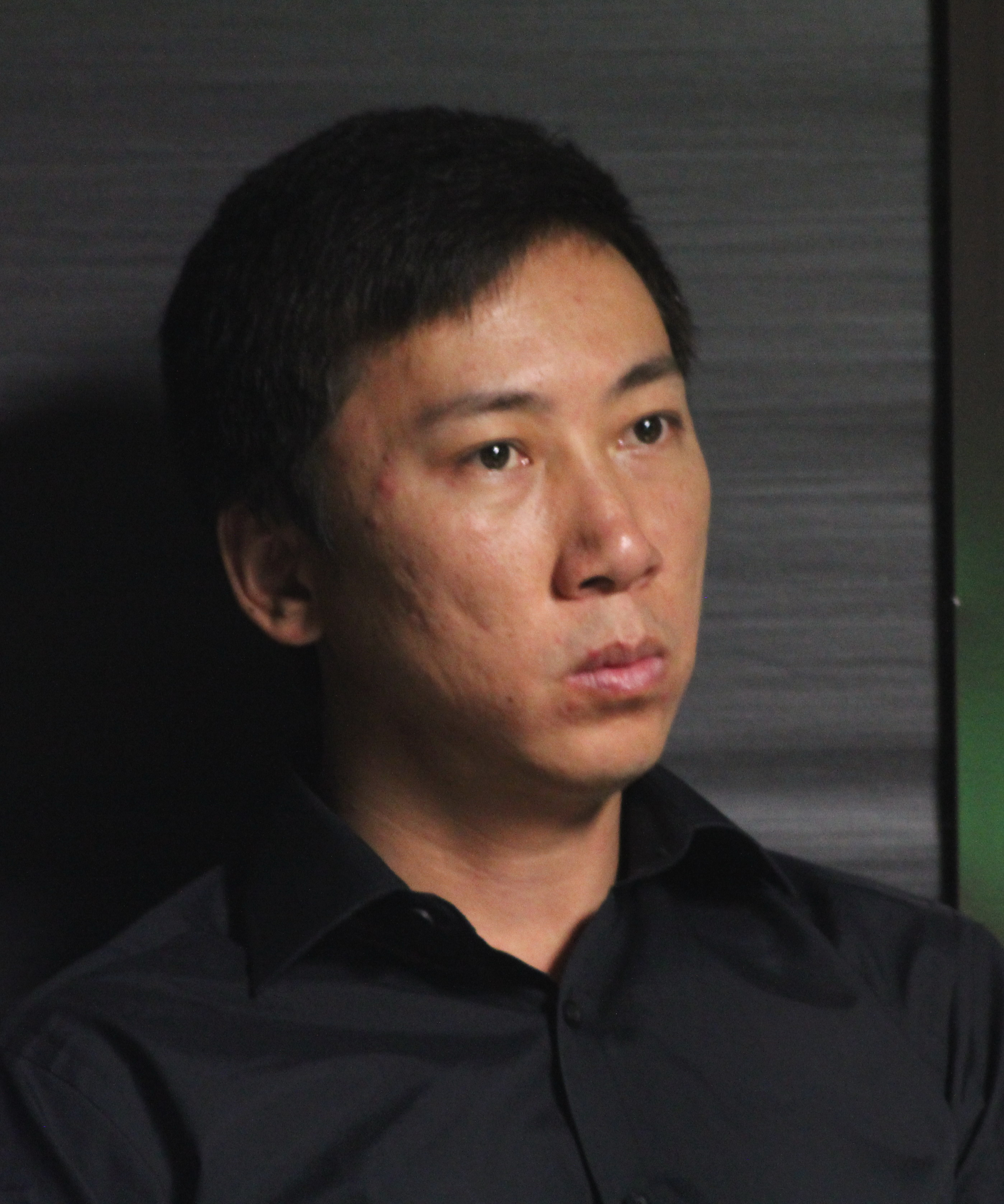
- Paul Hunter Classic 2014

Personal information
- Born: 16 August 1981 (age 45) Xinjiang, China

Sport
- Country: China
- Sport: Snooker
- Professional: 2013–2015
- Highest ranking: 92 (June–July 2014)
- Best ranking finish: Last 32 (x1)

Cao Xinlong (Chinese: 曹新龙; pinyin: Cáo Xīnlóng; born 16 August 1981) is a former professional snooker player from the People's Republic of China.

Cao turned professional in 2013 after finished fourth highest ranked amateur on the APTC Order of Merit, winning a tour card for 2013–14 and 2014–15 seasons.

== Career ==
=== 2013/14 season ===
Cao's best performances during the debut season came at the Asian Tour events where he reached last 32 stage twice. Elsewhere he was to struggle, winning just two matches in the full ranking tournaments. He finished the season ranked 115.

=== 2014/2015 season ===
Cao failed to win a match in any ranking event qualifier or European Tour event during the 2014–15 season. His only victories came on the Asian Tour where two last 32 exits out of the three events saw him placed 30th on the Order of Merit. Cao dropped off the tour at the end of the season as he was the world number 112.

== Performance and rankings timeline ==
Tournaments	2004/ 05	2007/ 08	2008/ 09	2011/ 12	2012/ 13	2013/ 14	2014/ 15
Rankings (Note: From the 2010/2011 season it shows the ranking at the beginning of the season.)	(Note: He was an amateur.)					(Note: New players on the Main Tour don't have a ranking.)	115
Ranking tournaments
Wuxi Classic (Note: The event was called the Jiangsu Classic (2008/2009))	Not held		Non-ranking		A	A	LQ
Australian Goldfields Open	Not held			A	A	A	LQ
Shanghai Masters	NH	WR	WR	WR	A	WD	LQ
International Championship	Not held				A	LQ	LQ
UK Championship	A	A	A	A	A	1R	1R
German Masters	Not held			A	A	WD	LQ
Welsh Open	A	A	A	A	A	1R	1R
Indian Open	Not held					A	LQ
Players Championship Grand Final (Note: The event was called the Players Tour Championship Grand Finals (2011/2012–2012/2013))	Not held			A	DNQ	DNQ	DNQ
China Open	WR	WR	1R	A	A	LQ	LQ
World Championship	A	A	A	A	A	LQ	A
Former ranking tournaments
World Open (Note: The event was called the Grand Prix (2004/2005–2008/2009))	A	A	A	A	A	LQ	NH

Performance Table Legend
LQ	lost in the qualifying draw	#R	lost in the early rounds of the tournament (WR = Wildcard round, RR = Round robin)	QF	lost in the quarter-finals
SF	lost in the semi-finals	F	lost in the final	W	won the tournament
DNQ	did not qualify for the tournament	A	did not participate in the tournament	WD	withdrew from the tournament

NH / Not Held	means an event was not held.
NR / Non-Ranking Event	means an event is/was no longer a ranking event.
R / Ranking Event	means an event is/was a ranking event.
MR / Minor-Ranking Event	means an event is/was a minor-ranking event.
