= Players Tour Championship =

Professional snooker tournaments

Tournament information
- Established: 2010
- Organisation(s): World Professional Billiards and Snooker Association
- Format: Minor-ranking events Ranking event (Tour Finals)
- Final year: 2016
- Final champion: Mark Allen (NIR)

The Players Tour Championship was a series of snooker tournaments comprising some minor-ranking events played in Europe, and an Asian leg comprising some minor-ranking events in Asia. The series concluded with a Grand Final, where qualification was based on performance in the other PTC events, and had the status of a full ranking tournament. Each regular event lasted for at least three days, with qualifying days for amateurs should the event be oversubscribed. Each event costs £100 to enter, and Main Tour players can gain ranking points in the events.

== History ==
The inaugural series ran from late June, with six events at the World Snooker Academy in Sheffield, one in Gloucester and another five in mainland Europe (with 3 in Germany). The finals took place in March featuring the best 24 players who had won the most money and played at least 6 events; 3 in Sheffield and 3 in mainland Europe. The prize money at each event was £50,000 or €50,000 at the regular events, with a total of £200,000 available in the Finals. The first event was held in the World Snooker Academy from 25 to 27 June 2010. In the first season the six events at the Academy were sponsored by Star Xing Pai. The prize money for the Finals was increased to £250,000 in 2011/2012. Originally the events played outside Sheffield were called Euro Players Tour Championship, but this distinction was abandoned for the second season.

In the 2012/2013 season the Players Tour Championship was expanded. The PTCs would no longer take place at the World Snooker Academy and instead were played at the South West Snooker Academy. In addition there was a decrease of PTCs being played in England, reduced to four events, with three new PTCs being created in Asia, called Asian Players Tour Championship. From this season the European events formed the European Tour, their prize money was increased to €70,000, and they were sponsored by Betfair. Finally as a result the Finals was expanded to accommodate 32 players instead of 24; with each tournament winner from the APTCs and the next top 4 players on the Asian Order of Merit qualifying; with an additional player qualifying from the UK/European Order of Merit. The seedings of the final were based on the combined list of both Order of Merits. The prize money of the Finals was also increased to £300,000, excluding the £1,000 prize money for Ding Junhui's maximum break.

In the 2013/2014 season the number of minor-ranking PTC events was reduced to twelve. The number of events played in England was further decreased to two, and the number of Asian events was raised to four. From this season the events held in Asia formed the Asian Tour, and the English events became part of the European Tour. The prize money of the continental European Tour events was increased to €125,000. The Finals still accommodated 32 players, but the number of qualified players from the Order of Merits has also changed with 24 coming through the European Tour Order of Merit and eight through the Asian Tour Order of Merit. The calculation method of the European Tour Order of Merit was also changed this season. The previously used €1=£1 system was changed to accommodate the increasing prize money of the continental European events. World Snooker decided to use the €1.2=£1 conversion rate.

In the 2014/2015 season the number of minor-ranking PTC events was further reduced to only nine events. There are no events played in England, and the number of Asian events was reduced to three after the second event, originally planned to be held in August, had to be cancelled. The prize money of the Grand Final was increased to £350,000.

== Reaction: criticism and support ==
The PTC has been both criticised and supported by players.

The PTC was criticised by several players for its comparatively low prize fund and associated costs. The events offered a top prize of just £10,000 while the first professional round offered no prize money at all. Ronnie O'Sullivan believed that the top players were not rewarded appropriately for what they do, while the lower-ranked players were left with financial losses, and stated that he felt "blackmailed" into entering the events due to the governing body's decision to attach ranking points to them. O'Sullivan likened the experience of competing on the PTC to being "raped". Stephen Maguire echoed O'Sullivan's sentiments, commenting that players were left out of pocket unless they did "really well", and that he felt like a "prostitute" being "forced" to play in the events. Maguire further criticised the lack of atmosphere and audience at some of the events. Another player described the European PTC events as "buying ranking points".

Steve Davis, on the other hand, believed that the events have been well received by most of the players and fans, and that they are integral to reinvigorating the circuit. Neil Robertson concurred with Davis' view and considered them important in developing the game overseas, and expressed his hopes that they would develop into fully sponsored and televised tournaments. Stephen Hendry welcomed the increase in playing opportunities for the players, but sympathised with O'Sullivan's view about being 'blackmailed' into entering the events, stating that he believed the events were too "top heavy" on ranking points considering "how little money there is to win".

The World Snooker Association stated that they had an obligation to provide playing opportunities for all players on the tour, and that while the top prize for the PTC events was relatively low, 24 players qualify for the Grand Final, which offered a top prize of £70,000 in 2011/2012. It affirmed its stance by stating "Two seasons ago there were only seven or eight events on the main tour calendar; now there are nearly 30 and total prize money has virtually doubled."

== Series finals and Order of Merit winners ==
Season	Winner	Runner-up	Final score	Order of Merit winner(s)	Refs
Players Tour Championship Finals (ranking event)
2010/2011	Shaun Murphy (ENG)	Martin Gould (ENG)	4–0	Shaun Murphy (ENG)	
2011/2012	Stephen Lee (ENG)	Neil Robertson (AUS)	4–0	Judd Trump (ENG)	
2012/2013	Ding Junhui (CHN)	Neil Robertson (AUS)	4–3	Mark Selby (ENG) and Stuart Bingham (ENG)	
2013/2014	Barry Hawkins (ENG)	Gerard Greene (NIR)	4–0	Mark Allen (NIR) and Liang Wenbo (CHN)	
2014/2015	Joe Perry (ENG)	Mark Williams (WAL)	4–3	Shaun Murphy (ENG) and Joe Perry (ENG)	
2015/2016	Mark Allen (NIR)	Ricky Walden (ENG)	10–6	Mark Selby (ENG) and Ding Junhui (CHN)	

== Statistics ==
=== Players Tour Championship – (Minor-ranking events) ===
Rank	Name	Nationality	Winner	Runner-up	Finals	First win	Last win
1	Mark Selby	England	7	3	10	2010	2016
2	Mark Allen	Northern Ireland	5	1	6	2012	2015
3	Judd Trump	England	4	4	8	2010	2012
4	Ding Junhui	China	4	3	7	2010	2015
5	Shaun Murphy	England	4	2	6	2010	2014
6	Neil Robertson	Australia	4	1	5	2011	2015
7	Stuart Bingham	England	4	0	4	2012	2014
8	John Higgins	Scotland	3	3	6	2010	2013
8	Stephen Maguire	Scotland	3	3	6	2012	2014
8	Ronnie O'Sullivan	England	3	3	6	2011	2013
11	Joe Perry	England	2	2	4	2013	2015
11	Michael Holt	England	2	2	4	2010	2011
13	Mark Williams	Wales	2	1	3	2010	2013
13	Stephen Lee	England	2	1	3	2010	2012
13	Tom Ford	England	2	1	3	2010	2011
16	Martin Gould	England	1	4	5	2012	2012
17	Liang Wenbo	China	1	2	3	2013	2013
17	Ricky Walden	England	1	2	3	2013	2013
17	Marco Fu	Hong Kong	1	2	3	2015	2015
20	Barry Pinches	England	1	1	2	2010	2010
20	Dominic Dale	Wales	1	1	2	2010	2010
22	Marcus Campbell	Scotland	1	0	1	2010	2010
22	Ben Woollaston	England	1	0	1	2011	2011
22	Andrew Higginson	England	1	0	1	2011	2011
22	Rod Lawler	England	1	0	1	2012	2012
22	Ju Reti	China	1	0	1	2013	2013
22	Barry Hawkins	England	1	0	1	2015	2015
22	Ali Carter	England	1	0	1	2015	2015
22	Rory McLeod	England	1	0	1	2015	2015
30	Jack Lisowski	England	0	2	2	N/A	N/A
30	Graeme Dott	Scotland	0	2	2	N/A	N/A
32	Anthony Hamilton	England	0	1	1	N/A	N/A
32	Matthew Couch	England	0	1	1	N/A	N/A
32	Jamie Jones	Wales	0	1	1	N/A	N/A
32	Mark Davis	England	0	1	1	N/A	N/A
32	Matthew Stevens	Wales	0	1	1	N/A	N/A
32	Joe Swail	Northern Ireland	0	1	1	N/A	N/A
32	Jamie Burnett	Scotland	0	1	1	N/A	N/A
32	Li Hang	China	0	1	1	N/A	N/A
32	Anthony McGill	Scotland	0	1	1	N/A	N/A
32	Gerard Greene	Northern Ireland	0	1	1	N/A	N/A
32	Lyu Haotian	China	0	1	1	N/A	N/A
32	Fergal O'Brien	Ireland	0	1	1	N/A	N/A
32	Oliver Lines	England	0	1	1	N/A	N/A
32	Robert Milkins	England	0	1	1	N/A	N/A
32	Matthew Selt	England	0	1	1	N/A	N/A
32	Thepchaiya Un-Nooh	Thailand	0	1	1	N/A	N/A
32	Tian Pengfei	China	0	1	1	N/A	N/A
32	Ryan Day	Wales	0	1	1	N/A	N/A
32	Michael White	Wales	0	1	1	N/A	N/A
Total Events			65	65	65	2010	2016

=== Event champions by country ===
Country	Players	Total	First title	Last title
England	18	39	2010	2016
Scotland	3	7	2010	2014
China	3	6	2010	2015
Northern Ireland	1	5	2012	2015
Australia	1	4	2011	2015
Wales	2	3	2010	2013
Hong Kong	1	1	2015	2015
