= 2015–16 snooker world rankings =

Preceded by 2014–15	2015–16	Succeeded by 2016–17

2015–16 snooker world rankings: The professional world rankings for all the professional snooker players who qualified for the 2015‍–‍16 season are listed below. The rankings work as a two-year rolling list. The points for each tournament two years ago are removed, when the corresponding tournament during the current season finishes. The following table contains the rankings, which were used to determine the seedings for certain tournaments.

Name	Country	Revision 1 (Note: Revision 1 was used for the seeding of the Australian Goldfields Open.)		Revision 2 (Note: Revision 2 was used for the seeding of the Shanghai Masters.)		Revision 3 (Note: Revision 3 was used for the seeding of the International Championship.)		Revision 4 (Note: Revision 4 was used for the seeding of the UK Championship.)		Revision 5 (Note: Revision 5 was used for the seeding of the Masters and the German Masters.)		Revision 6 (Note: Revision 6 was used for the seeding of the Welsh Open.)		Revision 7 (Note: Revision 7 was used for the seeding of the China Open.)		Revision 8 (Note: Revision 8 was used for the seeding of the World Snooker Championship.)		Revision 9	
Mark Selby	England	1	760,382	1	748,882	1	729,307	1	735,332	1	697,232	1	678,124	1	679,374	1	650,041	1	680,041
Stuart Bingham	England	2	608,028	2	595,278	2	608,745	2	591,212	2	567,720	2	570,303	2	572,803	2	592,720	2	586,720
Judd Trump	England	7	395,832	7	401,332	7	436,474	5	432,474	5	419,141	5	418,666	6	396,999	5	456,166	3	453,166
Shaun Murphy	England	6	457,499	6	451,249	6	454,974	4	465,116	4	468,116	4	467,533	4	466,366	3	475,058	4	450,058
Neil Robertson	Australia	3	602,693	4	503,943	4	482,943	3	479,443	3	475,943	3	475,943	3	473,443	4	461,360	5	406,360
John Higgins	Scotland	13	284,000	12	285,900	12	263,450	7	376,150	7	385,875	7	385,817	7	384,817	8	373,925	6	400,925
Mark Allen	Northern Ireland	12	314,500	11	311,500	10	327,225	10	331,450	11	298,367	11	296,450	9	298,200	7	386,700	7	392,700
Ricky Walden	England	10	318,171	10	318,827	11	295,727	12	297,310	12	271,027	12	271,752	11	271,752	9	318,752	8	324,752
Ding Junhui	China	4	592,100	3	584,600	3	511,600	9	356,500	9	334,500	9	331,692	12	266,525	17	183,425	9	314,925
Ronnie O'Sullivan	England	5	465,866	5	465,866	5	459,766	6	431,933	6	410,250	6	400,250	5	401,750	6	399,250	10	296,250
Joe Perry	England	9	358,723	9	336,348	9	330,232	11	312,632	10	304,932	10	301,599	10	294,766	10	306,083	11	290,083
Marco Fu	Hong Kong	11	315,566	13	265,116	13	248,516	14	198,841	14	217,241	13	234,074	13	235,824	14	203,241	12	253,241
Mark Williams	Wales	14	246,233	14	238,233	14	227,142	13	224,142	13	221,542	14	219,625	14	220,125	13	208,625	13	237,375
Barry Hawkins	England	8	381,433	8	368,683	8	363,458	8	363,875	8	345,358	8	344,775	8	346,025	11	250,025	14	228,025
Martin Gould	England	26	125,111	25	132,267	25	132,651	25	127,734	20	148,259	20	148,259	15	208,259	12	229,759	15	217,759
Kyren Wilson	England	56	62,251	54	62,782	22	136,849	22	134,374	24	141,757	24	142,899	19	157,899	19	174,899	16	195,899
Liang Wenbo	China	22	145,901	21	139,201	21	146,126	29	118,426	15	178,851	15	183,351	16	182,184	18	178,101	17	187,101
Stephen Maguire	Scotland	15	200,966	15	210,966	15	203,558	15	187,958	16	174,358	17	174,883	18	179,883	16	187,450	18	181,450
Michael White	Wales	17	177,220	16	177,832	16	178,349	16	175,541	17	171,883	16	179,883	17	180,133	15	190,033	19	178,033
Alan McManus	Scotland	23	137,206	26	128,159	23	135,959	23	128,776	26	130,093	26	130,035	26	128,868	29	122,951	20	163,951
Robert Milkins	England	16	187,660	19	160,160	19	157,977	17	156,044	21	147,761	22	147,761	22	147,761	21	154,644	21	163,644
David Gilbert	England	35	101,716	38	93,216	41	82,941	21	142,858	19	149,366	19	148,783	23	147,533	22	154,433	22	155,683
Ryan Day	Wales	20	162,987	20	154,699	20	154,707	19	147,732	18	156,299	18	155,282	24	146,115	20	156,557	23	153,807
Graeme Dott	Scotland	18	175,516	17	172,316	17	173,716	18	154,658	25	141,658	25	141,183	20	153,683	24	142,483	24	151,483
Matthew Selt	England	30	110,157	28	117,157	26	127,391	24	128,133	22	147,475	21	148,000	21	148,000	23	151,900	25	150,000
Mark Davis	England	19	171,985	18	162,610	18	158,985	20	142,985	23	146,468	23	147,368	25	139,035	26	139,277	26	139,877
Ben Woollaston	England	32	108,203	33	99,415	33	101,165	30	111,857	30	117,524	30	113,049	31	115,549	25	141,949	27	137,699
Anthony McGill	Scotland	24	137,112	23	136,643	24	132,984	27	124,467	28	119,992	28	120,517	29	119,517	30	118,017	28	135,017
Michael Holt	England	25	131,475	24	135,131	27	127,265	26	126,207	27	125,232	27	125,174	27	120,591	28	123,533	29	133,533
Luca Brecel	Belgium	44	78,431	44	77,431	42	82,881	40	88,023	36	94,215	36	95,357	28	120,357	27	128,757	30	130,357
Peter Ebdon	England	31	108,917	30	105,417	30	111,692	34	100,917	32	109,342	31	111,067	32	111,317	32	114,842	31	123,842
Ali Carter	England	29	114,050	29	112,050	28	125,100	28	120,000	29	118,300	29	117,300	30	119,050	31	115,050	32	121,050
Thepchaiya Un-Nooh	Thailand	49	71,745	46	71,698	48	71,448	36	95,615	34	103,615	34	103,032	36	101,782	35	98,307	33	103,207
Jimmy Robertson	England	41	86,610	42	79,863	46	73,713	38	88,738	38	90,280	38	90,280	38	90,530	36	96,972	34	98,372
Jamie Jones	Wales	38	96,083	31	102,383	31	104,833	32	105,441	31	109,383	32	109,700	33	111,200	33	106,683	35	98,183
Mark King	England	36	98,834	35	94,834	36	94,151	37	92,351	39	87,734	39	89,734	37	90,984	37	92,067	36	97,717
Mike Dunn	England	42	80,342	45	75,454	44	76,696	45	75,996	41	81,313	41	81,838	41	82,088	41	77,530	37	87,430
Dominic Dale	Wales	33	105,824	39	92,849	37	93,483	33	100,925	33	106,050	33	109,050	34	104,883	34	102,408	38	87,308
Jack Lisowski	England	53	69,332	52	66,332	53	66,299	49	70,824	43	80,349	51	75,349	50	74,349	43	76,749	39	86,149
Fergal O'Brien	Ireland	27	121,849	27	118,599	29	113,458	31	105,983	35	101,025	35	100,925	35	102,675	39	83,575	40	85,925
Mark Joyce	England	47	76,331	41	81,831	45	76,648	51	69,865	44	80,007	44	79,424	39	85,674	40	78,091	41	79,691
Gary Wilson	England	34	102,775	32	99,481	38	93,156	42	82,998	50	77,215	48	77,157	49	74,657	48	73,074	42	79,674
Tom Ford	England	59	60,324	61	50,949	54	61,516	54	63,258	51	75,558	49	76,458	48	75,208	38	84,933	43	79,533
Matthew Stevens	Wales	28	117,626	34	97,626	34	94,951	41	86,951	48	77,368	50	76,368	47	75,368	46	73,368	44	79,018
Dechawat Poomjaeng	Thailand	43	80,061	51	67,873	49	70,048	48	70,865	45	79,865	43	79,865	43	78,865	42	76,890	45	78,290
Sam Baird	England	72	36,332	65	36,832	65	36,832	68	37,357	67	41,857	66	42,382	64	42,382	59	54,107	46	76,107
Rod Lawler	England	39	94,870	36	94,823	35	94,732	39	88,674	40	85,991	40	86,308	51	71,141	44	76,224	47	75,724
Tian Pengfei	China	82	23,116	70	23,116	70	27,016	60	49,316	59	53,316	59	54,216	59	57,216	45	74,616	48	74,616
Rory McLeod	England	62	56,149	63	47,199	61	48,524	52	64,074	58	60,474	58	59,474	58	62,474	55	66,616	49	72,716
Kurt Maflin	Norway	37	96,730	37	93,483	39	89,825	43	82,942	47	78,767	46	77,375	46	76,958	54	67,383	50	72,283
Xiao Guodong	China	21	150,599	22	136,911	32	101,836	35	96,453	37	91,978	37	91,978	40	85,145	47	73,145	51	71,045
Li Hang	China	55	65,194	56	58,900	55	61,450	55	62,750	55	62,750	55	63,275	55	63,525	56	65,325	52	70,925
Joe Swail	Northern Ireland	64	54,582	59	55,488	60	55,996	58	53,663	53	65,080	53	65,080	53	66,580	51	71,997	53	66,997
Zhou Yuelong	China	75	28,283	68	29,283	68	30,308	62	43,108	60	48,008	60	48,533	60	50,033	58	55,758	54	65,658
Robbie Williams	England	50	70,164	49	69,664	50	69,848	56	60,290	57	60,690	57	61,007	57	62,507	57	63,924	55	65,174
Andrew Higginson	England	48	75,026	48	70,682	51	68,524	50	70,666	52	67,966	52	69,108	52	69,358	49	72,858	56	64,358
Ken Doherty	Ireland	45	78,338	47	71,150	47	72,725	47	72,808	49	77,333	47	77,333	42	79,083	52	70,083	57	63,983
Jamie Burnett	Scotland	46	77,950	43	78,350	43	80,375	44	79,375	42	81,275	42	81,275	45	77,108	50	72,608	58	60,608
Robin Hull	Finland	61	56,166	57	56,166	58	56,166	59	53,166	56	61,566	56	61,566	56	63,066	53	69,966	59	60,566
David Grace	England	111	5,166	86	5,416	78	13,416	81	13,416	63	43,416	61	46,416	62	46,416	60	52,916	60	59,516
Oliver Lines	England	78	27,833	69	28,333	69	30,058	67	37,583	64	42,483	63	44,208	63	44,208	63	44,208	61	50,808
Ian Burns	England	89	16,672	71	22,672	71	26,172	71	30,172	72	30,697	72	31,222	70	34,222	64	40,722	62	50,622
Yu Delu	China	52	69,819	53	64,850	57	58,250	53	63,375	54	64,375	54	63,900	54	65,400	62	50,900	63	50,400
Stuart Carrington	England	63	55,733	58	55,639	59	56,139	61	49,081	62	44,806	62	44,806	61	47,806	61	51,331	64	49,431
Zhang Anda	China	83	21,216	72	22,216	72	24,216	72	26,866	73	27,391	73	28,291	73	32,041	71	32,566	65	45,816
Gerard Greene	Northern Ireland	40	87,809	40	84,740	40	86,957	46	75,857	46	78,782	45	78,782	44	77,532	65	39,032	66	45,132
Liam Highfield	England	74	29,066	67	29,566	66	32,566	70	32,566	71	32,566	71	33,091	72	33,091	70	34,816	67	44,716
Craig Steadman	England	73	30,449	66	30,449	67	31,474	69	35,874	70	35,874	70	35,874	69	35,874	67	36,399	68	42,999
David Morris	Ireland	51	70,016	55	59,516	56	59,058	57	55,141	68	41,441	68	40,858	66	41,108	68	35,633	69	42,233
Mitchell Mann	England	88	17,366	75	17,866	75	18,391	75	19,291	76	19,816	76	19,816	76	19,816	74	27,541	70	40,791
Anthony Hamilton	England	58	61,399	62	50,399	63	44,807	65	41,807	66	42,190	65	43,090	68	40,423	72	29,823	71	39,223
Cao Yupeng	China	60	59,447	64	46,400	64	42,925	64	42,325	65	42,325	67	42,325	67	41,075	66	36,575	72	38,175
Peter Lines	England	57	61,618	60	53,449	62	47,149	66	40,166	69	35,983	69	35,983	71	33,483	69	34,925	73	36,525
Lee Walker	Wales	104	7,983	83	8,483	84	10,408	76	18,308	78	18,308	77	19,208	77	19,208	75	26,233	74	32,833
Alfie Burden	England			115	0	101	1,425	105	1,950	104	2,475	95	5,475	93	8,475	77	23,500	75	30,100
Michael Georgiou	England	90	15,766	74	20,266	74	20,791	74	21,591	74	25,591	74	25,591	74	25,591	73	28,591	76	28,591
Martin O'Donnell	England			101	250	94	2,550	89	7,350	92	7,875	92	7,875	90	9,375	78	20,275	77	26,875
Jamie Cope	England			99	500	83	10,500	79	14,500	77	18,500	78	18,500	78	18,500	79	18,500	78	25,100
Joel Walker	England	87	17,566	73	22,066	73	23,616	73	23,616	75	24,141	75	24,666	75	24,666	76	24,666	79	24,666
Ross Muir	Scotland			108	250	109	750	95	5,150	89	9,150	89	9,150	89	10,650	80	17,550	80	24,150
Scott Donaldson	Scotland	93	12,866	77	12,866	76	15,616	77	16,416	79	16,416	79	16,416	79	16,416	81	16,941	81	23,541
Noppon Saengkham	Thailand			122	0	122	0	97	4,400	98	4,400	99	4,400	101	4,400	82	16,900	82	23,500
Chris Wakelin	England			94	1,000	97	2,050	91	6,575	88	10,575	87	11,100	87	11,100	83	15,100	83	21,700
Nigel Bond	England			110	250	111	750	118	750	109	1,650	104	3,375	99	4,875	94	8,875	84	18,775
Zak Surety	England	97	10,666	80	10,666	80	11,691	82	11,691	84	12,216	82	13,116	80	14,616	84	14,616	85	14,616
Michael Wasley	England	92	13,582	76	14,082	77	14,582	78	14,582	80	14,582	80	14,582	81	14,582	85	14,582	86	14,582
Daniel Wells	Wales			104	250	104	1,150	93	5,675	85	11,400	85	12,300	85	12,300	86	14,300	87	14,300
Barry Pinches	England	94	12,839	78	12,839	79	12,839	80	13,639	81	13,639	81	13,639	82	13,639	87	13,639	88	13,639
Hossein Vafaei	Iran	126	0	87	4,500	88	6,500	92	6,500	94	6,500	93	7,025	94	7,025	97	7,025	89	13,625
Sean O'Sullivan	England			100	250	92	2,875	88	8,200	82	12,725	84	12,725	84	12,725	88	13,250	90	13,250
Chris Melling	England	96	10,832	79	10,832	81	11,332	83	11,332	83	12,232	83	12,757	83	12,757	89	12,757	91	12,757
Darryl Hill	Isle of Man			116	0	115	525	96	4,525	96	5,050	97	5,050	98	5,050	90	11,550	92	11,550
Michael Leslie	Scotland	105	7,972	82	8,972	85	9,472	85	10,372	87	10,897	86	11,422	86	11,422	91	11,422	93	11,422
Tony Drago	Malta	98	10,416	81	10,416	82	10,941	84	10,941	86	10,941	88	10,941	88	10,941	92	10,941	94	10,941
Rhys Clark	Scotland			113	250	119	250	116	775	116	1,300	116	1,300	106	2,800	93	9,825	95	9,825
Thanawat Thirapongpaiboon	Thailand	103	8,000	84	8,000	86	8,000	86	8,800	90	8,800	90	8,800	91	8,800	95	8,800	96	8,800
Sanderson Lam	England			106	250	107	775	87	8,700	91	8,700	91	8,700	92	8,700	96	8,700	97	8,700
Zhang Yong	China			119	0	118	500	110	1,400	114	1,400	114	1,400	115	1,400	115	1,400	98	8,000
Paul Davison	England			111	250	112	750	113	1,150	117	1,150	117	1,150	117	1,150	116	1,150	99	7,750
Lu Ning	China	114	3,067	89	3,317	89	5,317	94	5,317	95	5,317	96	5,317	95	6,817	98	6,817	100	6,817
Sydney Wilson	England			112	250	113	750	119	750	97	4,750	98	4,750	100	4,750	99	6,750	101	6,750
Hamza Akbar	Pakistan			123	0	123	0	123	0	123	0	123	0	123	0	122	0	102	6,600
Steve Davis	England	106	6,583	85	6,583	87	6,583	90	6,583	93	6,583	94	6,583	96	6,583	100	6,583	103	6,583
Steven Hallworth	England	116	2,416	91	2,666	93	2,666	102	2,666	103	2,666	105	2,666	97	5,666	101	6,191	104	6,191
Thor Chuan Leong	Malaysia	125	0	114	0	95	2,250	101	2,775	102	3,300	100	4,200	102	4,200	102	5,925	105	5,925
James Wattana	Thailand	123	400	98	400	105	900	111	1,300	115	1,300	115	1,300	116	1,300	103	5,300	106	5,300
Ian Glover	England	115	2,966	90	3,216	91	3,216	100	3,616	101	3,616	101	4,141	103	4,141	104	4,141	107	4,141
Lu Chenwei	China	113	3,600	88	3,600	90	3,600	98	4,125	99	4,125	102	4,125	104	4,125	105	4,125	108	4,125
Michael Wild	England			120	0	120	0	99	4,000	100	4,000	103	4,000	105	4,000	106	4,000	109	4,000
James Cahill	England			105	250	106	775	106	1,700	108	1,700	110	1,700	111	1,700	107	3,700	110	3,700
Allan Taylor	England			95	1,000	100	1,500	108	1,500	112	1,500	112	1,500	113	1,500	108	3,500	111	3,500
Gareth Allen	Wales			102	250	96	2,250	103	2,250	105	2,250	106	2,250	107	2,250	109	2,775	112	2,775
Eden Sharav	Scotland			103	250	103	1,275	112	1,275	106	2,175	107	2,175	108	2,175	110	2,700	113	2,700
Rouzi Maimaiti	China	118	1,700	92	1,700	98	1,700	104	2,100	107	2,100	108	2,100	109	2,100	111	2,100	114	2,100
Jason Weston	England			117	0	116	750	114	1,050	110	1,575	109	2,100	110	2,100	112	2,100	115	2,100
Fraser Patrick	Scotland			97	500	99	1,525	107	1,525	111	1,525	111	1,525	112	1,525	113	2,050	116	2,050
Ju Reti	China	120	1,400	93	1,400	102	1,400	109	1,400	113	1,400	113	1,400	114	1,400	114	1,400	117	1,400
Duane Jones	Wales			107	250	108	775	115	775	118	775	118	775	118	775	117	775	118	775
Vinnie Calabrese	Australia			109	250	110	750	117	750	119	750	119	750	119	750	118	750	119	750
Liu Chuang	China	122	600	96	600	114	600	120	600	120	600	120	600	120	600	119	600	120	600
Jimmy White	England			118	0	117	500	121	500	121	500	121	500	121	500	120	500	121	500
Steve Mifsud	Australia	127	0	121	0	121	0	122	0	122	0	122	0	122	0	121	0	122	0
Akani Songsermsawad	Thailand			124	0	124	0	124	0	124	0	124	0	124	0	123	0	123	0
Itaro Santos	Brazil			125	0	125	0	125	0	125	0	125	0	125	0	124	0	124	0
Hatem Yassen	Egypt			126	0	126	0	126	0	126	0	126	0	126	0	125	0	125	0
Igor Figueiredo	Brazil			127	0	127	0	127	0	127	0	127	0	127	0	126	0	126	0
Stephen Hendry	Scotland	128	0	128	0	128	0	128	0	128	0	128	0	128	0	127	0	127	0
Aditya Mehta	India	54	68,041	50	68,072	52	67,689	63	42,672	61	46,197	64	43,389	65	42,139	Resigned from the Tour			
