= 2016–17 snooker world rankings =

Preceded by 2015–16	2016–17	Succeeded by 2017–18

2016–17 snooker world rankings: The professional world rankings for all the professional snooker players who qualified for the 2016‍–‍17 season are listed below. The rankings work as a two-year rolling list. The points for each tournament two years ago are removed when the corresponding tournament during the current season finishes. The following table contains the rankings, which were used to determine the seedings for certain tournaments.

Name	Country	Revision 1 (Note: Revision 1 was used for the seeding of the Indian Open and the World Open.)		Revision 2 (Note: Revision 2 was used for the seeding of the Shanghai Masters.)		Revision 3 (Note: Revision 3 was used for the seeding of the International Championship and the European Masters.)		Revision 4 (Note: Revision 4 was used for the seeding of the English Open.)		Revision 5 (Note: Revision 5 was used for the seeding of the Northern Ireland Open and the UK Championship.)		Revision 6 (Note: Revision 6 was used for the seeding of the Scottish Open, Masters and the German Masters.)		Revision 7 (Note: Revision 7 was used for the seeding of the China Open.)		Revision 8 (Note: Revision 8 was used for the seeding of the Welsh Open.)		Revision 9		Revision 10 (Note: Revision 10 was used for the seeding of the World Snooker Championship.)		Revision 11	
Mark Selby	England	1	680,041	1	659,733	1	675,150	1	690,650	1	827,942	1	994,942	1	994,942	1	932,025	1	935,425	1	943,425	1	1,298,425
John Higgins	Scotland	6	400,925	5	401,308	5	400,725	5	408,725	6	440,892	3	456,809	3	484,892	3	483,892	6	421,500	6	423,000	2	563,000
Judd Trump	England	3	453,166	4	411,166	4	401,166	4	409,166	3	516,499	4	446,499	4	463,166	4	456,333	3	488,500	2	598,000	3	538,000
Ding Junhui	China	9	314,925	9	311,425	9	311,425	6	376,925	4	443,925	5	444,925	6	444,925	5	442,425	5	448,450	4	465,950	4	510,950
Barry Hawkins	England	14	228,025	15	214,525	16	213,525	16	221,525	14	238,025	10	270,025	12	271,025	12	276,025	7	386,750	7	380,250	5	395,250
Marco Fu	Hong Kong	12	253,241	13	244,333	13	243,750	12	243,750	13	238,375	14	253,958	8	323,375	8	325,125	9	336,625	8	376,125	6	393,625
Neil Robertson	Australia	5	406,360	7	361,499	7	359,582	7	359,582	7	380,624	7	365,291	7	371,291	7	365,958	8	358,125	9	363,125	7	358,125
Shaun Murphy	England	4	450,058	3	456,308	3	455,308	3	447,308	5	442,100	6	444,267	5	446,767	6	419,100	4	454,350	5	457,350	8	357,350
Stuart Bingham	England	2	586,720	2	581,509	2	582,034	2	516,534	2	545,846	2	518,929	2	517,012	2	527,845	2	597,262	3	588,762	9	313,762
Mark Allen	Northern Ireland	7	392,700	6	382,700	6	363,592	8	336,592	10	279,592	9	294,592	10	300,592	9	299,425	10	309,650	11	302,650	10	307,650
Liang Wenbo	China	17	187,101	20	180,601	19	179,584	20	179,584	11	265,084	11	267,667	11	277,667	14	261,000	13	278,500	13	289,500	11	305,500
Ali Carter	England	32	121,050	16	213,300	15	214,200	14	226,200	12	244,325	13	254,325	14	256,825	11	283,075	12	289,075	10	322,575	12	302,575
Kyren Wilson	England	16	195,899	14	226,399	14	226,924	15	225,174	15	225,091	16	241,508	16	246,925	15	248,425	15	246,425	14	264,425	13	301,925
Ronnie O'Sullivan	England	10	296,250	10	296,250	11	294,333	10	302,333	8	326,583	12	257,583	13	267,583	13	262,250	14	269,750	12	291,250	14	298,750
Mark Williams	Wales	13	237,375	12	251,008	12	251,008	13	243,008	16	222,808	15	242,975	15	247,975	16	245,975	17	210,975	17	199,975	15	211,975
Martin Gould	England	15	217,759	17	197,142	17	196,559	18	194,559	20	185,059	19	187,059	19	187,059	18	197,892	19	200,975	18	194,975	16	210,975
Anthony McGill	Scotland	28	135,017	18	193,600	18	193,125	17	197,375	18	204,125	18	192,625	18	195,125	19	192,625	16	229,650	15	230,150	17	200,150
Ryan Day	Wales	23	153,807	26	152,832	24	153,357	23	157,357	23	159,586	25	166,003	24	167,503	24	166,670	18	209,587	16	209,087	18	197,087
David Gilbert	England	22	155,683	22	166,850	22	166,792	22	174,792	21	177,917	20	186,417	20	185,417	20	186,667	20	192,650	20	188,650	19	194,650
Mark King	England	36	97,717	35	100,042	35	99,984	35	102,984	35	106,967	22	175,050	21	176,550	21	175,533	22	187,975	21	188,475	20	191,475
Ricky Walden	England	8	324,752	8	316,308	8	312,208	9	312,208	17	211,591	17	213,091	17	216,008	17	219,758	21	191,400	22	187,400	21	187,400
Joe Perry	England	11	290,083	11	294,608	10	295,133	11	295,133	9	302,716	8	306,633	9	306,800	10	294,133	11	292,700	19	193,700	22	181,700
Michael Holt	England	29	133,533	28	144,783	28	145,683	26	149,683	22	168,808	23	172,725	22	174,225	22	175,475	23	181,500	23	175,500	23	178,500
Stephen Maguire	Scotland	18	181,450	19	181,167	20	179,250	19	190,750	19	196,250	21	176,250	25	158,917	27	145,250	24	143,275	24	140,775	24	178,275
Anthony Hamilton	England			100	3,000	102	3,525	106	3,525	76	20,525	68	40,525	66	46,525	37	106,525	33	119,925	25	134,925	25	142,925
Michael White	Wales	19	178,033	21	174,533	21	175,258	21	175,258	24	159,258	24	170,675	23	173,175	23	174,925	27	133,825	27	129,825	26	135,825
Luca Brecel	Belgium	30	130,357	31	129,299	31	128,299	32	125,799	30	129,091	26	151,091	26	150,508	26	150,508	28	126,075	30	122,075	27	132,075
Ben Woollaston	England	27	137,699	29	137,599	29	137,599	27	141,849	26	146,474	27	146,891	27	148,808	25	150,708	34	118,025	28	124,525	28	130,525
Alan McManus	Scotland	20	163,951	24	155,367	25	152,934	28	140,934	28	138,517	28	146,017	28	146,017	28	144,767	25	135,850	26	132,850	29	128,850
Graeme Dott	Scotland	24	151,483	25	152,933	26	151,933	29	139,933	27	144,558	30	129,558	30	131,475	30	130,875	30	125,375	29	122,875	30	127,875
Tom Ford	England	43	79,533	40	81,558	38	90,558	37	90,558	34	108,058	36	107,558	37	107,558	36	112,558	36	115,500	32	115,500	31	122,500
Zhou Yuelong	China	54	65,658	49	71,925	49	71,925	47	71,525	43	78,425	40	95,925	40	95,925	42	94,425	37	108,325	37	108,325	32	118,325
Dominic Dale	Wales	38	87,308	38	87,725	36	91,642	40	85,642	38	91,684	37	106,684	35	110,767	35	113,767	32	121,350	35	110,850	33	116,850
Matthew Selt	England	25	150,000	23	155,883	23	155,300	24	155,300	25	155,300	29	142,300	29	132,300	29	131,100	29	125,500	33	114,000	34	110,000
Robert Milkins	England	21	163,644	27	149,283	27	147,366	25	153,366	31	122,783	34	113,783	32	123,783	32	125,283	26	133,975	31	121,475	35	109,475
Jamie Jones	Wales	35	98,183	37	88,283	39	90,283	36	93,783	37	95,095	33	117,012	34	115,095	34	116,845	35	116,987	36	108,987	36	108,987
Mark Davis	England	26	139,877	30	134,374	30	136,791	30	136,791	29	136,608	31	123,108	31	128,108	31	127,108	31	123,750	34	111,250	37	107,250
Jimmy Robertson	England	34	98,372	34	107,233	34	106,650	34	103,650	36	101,545	35	110,045	36	109,462	38	105,962	40	104,487	39	101,487	38	105,487
Xiao Guodong	China	51	71,045	52	69,934	55	68,542	49	70,542	56	67,542	52	69,542	53	72,042	57	67,275	46	81,775	44	85,775	39	101,775
Peter Ebdon	England	31	123,842	32	126,842	32	126,842	31	126,842	33	109,654	38	103,571	38	104,154	39	102,987	41	99,887	42	89,387	40	99,387
Rory McLeod	England	49	72,716	54	68,183	54	68,708	53	68,958	52	70,270	55	66,270	58	65,687	58	65,687	58	64,687	54	72,687	41	97,687
Thepchaiya Un-Nooh	Thailand	33	103,207	33	122,624	33	126,541	33	124,041	32	120,841	32	119,841	33	119,258	33	117,258	38	105,675	38	101,675	42	95,675
Mike Dunn	England	37	87,430	36	91,958	37	90,958	38	88,458	40	87,458	43	88,875	43	92,375	44	92,375	42	92,400	41	92,400	43	94,400
David Grace	England	60	59,516	58	61,516	57	64,516	55	64,516	46	74,058	49	73,475	48	73,475	51	73,475	50	77,475	51	77,475	44	93,475
Fergal O'Brien	Ireland	40	85,925	41	80,725	41	79,333	52	69,333	51	70,562	44	82,145	44	84,062	46	81,562	45	84,062	45	85,062	45	92,062
Stuart Carrington	England	64	49,431	61	55,592	61	56,117	58	61,617	54	68,534	54	66,617	55	69,117	55	70,867	52	76,450	48	80,450	46	84,450
Yu Delu	China	63	50,400	64	49,900	64	45,900	64	45,900	64	45,525	59	59,025	46	79,025	47	78,675	47	80,175	47	81,175	47	84,175
Mark Joyce	England	41	79,691	50	71,441	50	71,383	45	73,383	44	77,495	45	78,912	45	81,412	45	81,662	51	76,662	46	81,662	48	83,662
Andrew Higginson	England	56	64,358	56	66,300	56	67,200	56	64,200	49	71,617	47	74,200	49	73,200	49	74,700	53	75,200	49	80,200	49	79,200
Tian Pengfei	China	48	74,616	47	75,466	48	72,133	50	70,383	47	72,883	51	72,300	51	72,300	54	71,550	56	67,575	52	75,575	50	77,575
Sam Baird	England	46	76,107	48	72,132	46	73,274	48	71,524	50	70,941	46	78,858	47	77,858	48	76,608	54	74,025	53	74,025	51	76,025
Kurt Maflin	Norway	50	72,283	46	75,700	44	76,600	42	80,850	42	85,579	41	93,579	42	94,162	43	94,162	39	104,687	43	87,687	52	75,687
Robbie Williams	England	55	65,174	55	68,174	52	69,316	51	69,566	53	68,649	48	73,566	50	72,983	52	73,233	49	78,650	50	78,650	53	74,650
Jack Lisowski	England	39	86,149	44	77,699	43	78,016	44	75,016	45	75,745	50	72,745	52	72,162	50	73,662	48	78,662	55	72,162	54	74,162
Matthew Stevens	Wales	44	79,018	43	78,824	42	78,766	41	81,766	41	86,495	42	91,912	41	94,412	41	95,912	43	88,912	40	92,412	55	72,412
Yan Bingtao	China			104	2,250	99	3,975	101	4,475	77	20,100	70	36,100	70	36,100	68	43,600	61	55,125	63	55,125	56	71,125
Gary Wilson	England	42	79,674	39	86,199	40	86,141	39	86,141	39	90,870	39	96,870	39	98,787	40	98,837	44	87,362	59	58,862	57	68,862
Li Hang	China	52	70,925	51	70,058	51	70,375	54	66,375	57	63,275	57	63,275	57	66,775	59	64,075	59	58,575	56	65,075	58	68,075
Hossein Vafaei	Iran	73	13,625	75	13,625	75	13,625	75	13,625	82	13,625	78	23,625	79	26,125	81	26,125	76	32,625	64	53,625	59	65,625
Oliver Lines	England	61	50,808	60	56,725	60	56,725	61	56,725	61	53,037	53	67454	54	69,954	56	68,704	57	66,787	58	62,787	60	64,787
Alfie Burden	England	65	30,100	65	36,100	65	36,100	65	36,100	63	48,350	64	48,350	65	48,350	66	48,350	65	52,350	61	56,350	61	64,350
Daniel Wells	Wales	72	14,300	69	24,300	69	24,300	69	26,300	67	37,112	66	42,112	67	45,612	67	45,612	69	47,512	62	55,512	62	63,512
Chris Wakelin	England	70	21,700	72	22,225	72	22,750	70	24,750	66	38,750	65	46,250	64	49,750	65	49,750	64	53,275	65	53,275	63	61,275
Noppon Saengkham	Thailand	69	23,500	71	24,025	71	24,025	72	24,025	72	26,525	75	31,525	72	35,025	71	36,525	73	37,550	72	44,050	64	60,050
Scott Donaldson	Scotland			112	0	113	525	92	6,525	83	13,525	77	24,525	77	27,025	77	27,025	68	47,525	66	51,525	65	59,525
Ian Burns	England	62	50,622	62	54,783	62	54,783	63	53,033	62	48,645	63	48,645	63	51,562	64	50,312	62	53,812	60	57,812	66	57,812
Ross Muir	Scotland	68	24,150	70	24,150	70	24,150	71	24,650	70	31,150	69	36,150	69	36,150	70	37,650	70	43,150	70	47,150	67	55,150
Rod Lawler	England	47	75,724	45	76,724	47	72,624	46	72,874	55	68,103	60	57,770	60	56,770	62	55,520	67	50,437	71	46,437	68	52,437
Robin Hull	Finland	59	60,566	63	54,066	63	54,066	62	53,666	59	60,291	56	65,791	56	68,708	53	72,458	55	72,375	57	64,375	69	52,375
Dechawat Poomjaeng	Thailand	45	78,290	42	79,232	45	76,424	43	75,924	48	72,141	58	62,558	59	62,558	60	62,358	60	57,275	68	49,275	70	51,275
Joe Swail	Northern Ireland	53	66,997	53	68,633	53	69,158	57	63,158	60	55,387	62	53,470	61	55,970	61	55,970	63	53,387	67	50,387	71	49,387
Nigel Bond	England	71	18,775	66	32,275	66	32,275	66	35,275	68	35,275	71	35,275	71	35,275	72	35,275	71	40,275	73	40,275	72	48,275
Ken Doherty	Ireland	57	63,983	57	63,233	58	63,233	60	57,233	58	61,233	61	54,150	62	54,150	63	52,900	66	51,400	69	48,400	73	47,400
Martin O'Donnell	England	66	26,875	67	29,925	67	29,925	67	31,925	69	31,925	74	31,925	75	31,925	75	31,925	77	32,450	75	38,950	74	46,950
Rhys Clark	Scotland	76	9,825	79	9,825	78	10,350	79	10,850	73	21,350	76	26,350	76	28,850	76	28,850	80	30,250	78	34,250	75	42,250
Jamie Cope	England	67	25,100	68	29,625	68	29,625	68	30,125	71	30,125	72	32,625	74	32,625	74	32,625	74	35,125	74	39,125	76	39,125
John Astley	England			77	10,500	77	11,400	77	11,400	75	20,900	79	23,400	81	23,400	78	26,400	79	31,125	80	31,125	76	39,125
Zhang Anda	China			83	8,000	83	8,000	78	11,000	84	13,500	73	32,000	73	34,500	73	34,500	75	34,500	76	38,500	78	38,500
Akani Songsermsawad	Thailand	91	0	80	9,000	82	9,000	82	9,500	78	16,000	83	19,500	82	22,000	82	25,000	82	25,500	82	25,500	79	37,500
Liam Highfield	England			106	2,000	100	3,725	105	3,725	99	7,225	81	22,225	80	24,725	79	26,225	81	27,225	81	27,225	80	35,225
Lee Walker	Wales			92	4,525	92	5,425	94	5,925	87	12,425	90	14,925	93	14,925	94	14,925	88	21,825	91	21,825	81	33,825
Mei Xiwen	China			112	0	112	900	85	8,900	86	12,712	80	22,712	78	26,212	80	26,212	78	32,212	79	32,212	82	32,212
Eden Sharav	Scotland	86	2,700	91	4,700	93	4,700	98	5,200	94	9,200	98	11,700	99	11,700	101	11,700	96	15,725	89	22,225	83	30,225
Jamie Burnett	Scotland	58	60,608	59	58,108	59	58,108	59	58,108	65	40,608	67	40,608	68	40,608	69	40,608	72	38,025	77	35,025	84	26,025
Hammad Miah	England			93	4,000	96	4,000	90	7,000	97	8,312	95	13,312	95	13,312	97	13,312	102	13,837	104	13,837	85	25,837
Allan Taylor	England	84	3,500	78	10,025	79	10,025	81	10,525	89	11,837	94	14,337	94	14,337	92	15,837	89	19,737	83	23,737	86	23,737
Zhao Xintong	China			99	3,050	101	3,575	95	5,575	85	13,387	85	18,387	86	18,387	83	22,137	83	23,537	84	23,537	87	23,537
James Wattana	Thailand			90	6,000	90	6,000	93	6,500	74	21,000	82	21,000	84	21,000	85	21,000	84	23,500	85	23,500	88	23,500
Sean O'Sullivan	England	74	13,250	74	14,300	74	14,300	74	14,800	81	14,800	91	14,800	85	20,800	86	20,800	85	23,300	86	23,300	89	23,300
Michael Georgiou	Cyprus			97	3,525	95	4,425	99	4,925	106	6,237	84	18,737	83	21,237	84	21,237	86	23,237	87	23,237	90	23,237
Paul Davison	England	79	7,750	85	7,750	85	7,750	80	10,750	92	10,750	87	15,750	90	15,750	93	15,750	93	18,250	88	22,250	91	22,250
Mitchell Mann	England			106	2,000	108	2,000	112	2,000	116	2,000	93	14,500	87	18,000	88	18,000	87	22,025	90	22,025	92	22,025
Sanderson Lam	England	77	8,700	81	8,700	80	9,225	83	9,225	93	9,225	97	12,725	97	12,725	100	12,725	99	14,450	92	20,950	93	20,950
Jimmy White	England	90	500	103	2,500	91	5,500	96	5,500	108	5,500	105	8,000	102	11,500	95	14,500	95	16,025	93	20,025	94	20,025
Zhang Yong	China	78	8,000	73	14,525	73	14,525	73	15,025	80	15,025	89	15,025	92	15,025	87	18,025	90	19,550	94	19,550	95	19,550
Jak Jones	Wales			109	1,050	109	1,050	114	1,050	79	15,362	88	15,362	91	15,362	91	16,862	91	18,862	95	18,862	96	18,862
Sam Craigie	England			86	7,025	86	7,025	89	7,025	96	8,337	86	15,837	89	15,837	89	17,337	91	18,862	95	18,862	96	18,862
Duane Jones	Wales	89	775	84	7,775	84	7,775	87	8,275	88	12,087	92	14,587	88	17,087	90	17,087	94	17,612	97	17,612	98	17,612
Aditya Mehta	India			112	0	116	0	120	0	101	7,000	103	9,500	98	12,000	96	13,500	103	13,500	98	17,500	99	17,500
Sydney Wilson	England	80	6,750	87	6,750	87	6,750	91	6,750	102	6,750	108	6,750	105	9,250	106	9,250	110	9,250	112	9,250	100	17,250
Ian Preece	Wales			112	0	116	0	107	3,000	104	6,500	110	6,500	106	9,000	107	9,000	111	9,000	113	9,000	101	17,000
Fang Xiongman	China			102	2,525	105	2,525	109	2,525	114	2,525	119	2,525	114	5,025	113	6,525	116	7,550	116	7,550	102	15,550
Wang Yuchen	China			93	4,000	96	4,000	103	4,000	98	8,000	96	13,000	96	13,000	99	13,000	97	15,500	99	15,500	103	15,500
Darryl Hill	Isle of Man	75	11,550	76	11,550	76	11,550	76	11,550	91	11,550	100	11,550	101	11,550	102	11,550	98	15,050	100	15,050	104	15,050
Fraser Patrick	Scotland	88	2,050	101	2,575	104	2,575	108	2,575	107	6,075	102	9,575	104	9,575	104	9,575	106	10,600	101	14,600	105	14,600
James Cahill	England	83	3,700	82	8,225	81	9,125	84	9,125	90	11,625	99	11,625	100	11,625	98	13,125	100	14,125	102	14,125	106	14,125
Craig Steadman	England			112	0	113	525	116	1,025	113	3,525	112	6,025	113	6,025	111	7,525	101	14,050	103	14,050	107	14,050
Alex Borg	Malta			112	0	116	0	120	0	123	0	120	2,500	115	5,000	114	6,500	111	9,000	105	13,000	108	13,000
Thor Chuan Leong	Malaysia			89	6,500	89	6,500	86	8,500	95	8,500	104	8,500	107	8,500	108	8,500	104	11,900	106	11,900	109	11,900
Gareth Allen	Wales	85	2,775	98	3,300	103	3,300	97	5,300	111	5,300	113	5,300	110	7,800	110	7,800	115	7,800	107	11,800	110	11,800
Igor Figueiredo	Brazil	94	0	112	0	116	0	120	0	123	0	124	0	121	2,500	118	4,000	105	11,725	108	11,725	111	11,725
Hamza Akbar	Pakistan	81	6,600	88	6,600	88	6,600	88	7,100	100	7,100	101	9,600	103	9,600	103	9,600	107	10,100	109	10,100	112	10,100
Adam Duffy	England			110	525	109	1,050	102	4,050	110	5,362	107	7,862	109	7,862	105	9,362	108	9,362	110	9,362	113	9,362
Elliot Slessor	England			106	2,000	105	2,525	109	2,525	105	6,337	111	6,337	112	6,337	115	6,337	108	9,362	110	9,362	113	9,362
Josh Boileau	Ireland			112	0	116	0	120	0	117	1,312	114	4,812	116	4,812	116	4,812	113	8,312	114	8,312	115	8,312
Kritsanut Lertsattayathorn	Thailand			112	0	116	0	112	2,000	108	5,500	105	8,000	108	8,000	109	8,000	114	8,000	115	8,000	116	8,000
Michael Wild	England	82	4,000	93	4,000	96	4,000	103	4,000	103	6,625	109	6,625	111	6,625	112	6,625	117	6,625	117	6,625	117	6,625
Cao Yupeng	China			93	4,000	94	4,525	100	4,525	112	4,525	115	4,525	117	4,525	117	4,525	118	6,525	118	6,525	118	6,525
Christopher Keogan	England			110	525	109	1,050	115	1,050	119	1,050	123	1,050	124	1,050	122	2,550	119	5,050	119	5,050	119	5,050
Boonyarit Keattikun	Thailand			112	0	116	0	120	0	123	0	124	0	125	0	124	1,500	120	4,000	120	4,000	120	4,000
Chen Zhe	China			112	0	116	0	118	500	121	500	117	3,000	119	3,000	120	3,000	121	3,500	121	3,500	121	3,500
Jamie Curtis-Barrett	England			112	0	116	0	118	500	121	500	117	3,000	119	3,000	120	3,000	121	3,500	121	3,500	121	3,500
Kurt Dunham	Australia			112	0	113	525	117	525	120	525	116	3,025	118	3,025	119	3,025	123	3,025	123	3,025	123	3,025
Jason Weston	England	87	2,100	105	2,100	107	2,100	111	2,100	115	2,100	121	2,100	122	2,100	123	2,100	124	2,600	124	2,600	124	2,600
David John	Wales			112	0	116	0	120	0	117	1,312	122	1,312	123	1,312	125	1,312	125	2,337	125	2,337	125	2,337
Itaro Santos	Brazil	92	0	112	0	116	0	120	0	123	0	124	0	125	0	126	0	126	0	126	0	126	0
Hatem Yassen	Egypt	93	0	112	0	116	0	120	0	123	0	124	0	125	0	126	0	126	0	126	0	126	0
Rouzi Maimaiti	China			112	0	116	0	120	0	123	0	124	0	125	0	126	0	126	0	126	0	126	0
Leo Fernandez	Ireland			112	0	116	0	120	0	123	0	124	0	125	0	126	0	126	0	126	0	126	0
