= 2015 Q School =

Snooker tournaments

Tournament information
- Dates: 14–25 May 2015
- Venue: Meadowside Centre
- City: Burton-upon-Trent
- Country: England
- Format: Qualifying School
- Qualifiers: 8 via the 2 events

The 2015 Q School was a series of two snooker tournaments held at the start of the 2015–16 snooker season. An event for amateur players, it served as a qualification event for a place on the professional World Snooker Tour for the following two seasons. The events took place in May 2015 at the Meadowside Centre in Burton-upon-Trent, England with a total 8 players qualifying via the two tournaments.

== Format ==
The 2015 Q School consisted of two events. The two events had 166 entries competing for 8 places on the main tour, four players qualifying from each of the two events. All matches were the best of seven frames.

== Event 1 ==
The first 2015 Q School event was held from 14 to 19 May 2015. Sydney Wilson, Daniel Wells, Eden Sharav and Rhys Clark qualified. Wells had previously held a tour card. The results of the four final matches are given below.

- Sydney Wilson (ENG) 4–1 Chen Zhe (CHN)
- Daniel Wells (WAL) 4–1 Alexander Ursenbacher (SWI)
- Eden Sharav (SCO) 4–3 Adam Duffy (ENG)
- Rhys Clark (SCO) 4–1 Leo Fernandez (IRL)

== Event 2 ==
The second 2015 Q School event was held from 20 to 25 May 2015. Jason Weston, Gareth Allen, Duane Jones and Paul Davison qualified. Weston and Davison had previously held a tour card. The results of the four final matches are given below.

- Jason Weston (ENG) 4–2 Kuldesh Johal (ENG)
- Gareth Allen (WAL) 4–2 Alex Taubman (WAL)
- Duane Jones (WAL) 4–3 Zhao Xintong (CHN)
- Paul Davison (ENG) 4–3 Luke Simmonds (ENG)

== Q School Order of Merit ==
A Q School Order of Merit was produced for players who didn't qualify from the two events. The Order of Merit was used to top up fields for the 2015–16 snooker season where an event failed to attract the required number of entries. The rankings in the Order of Merit were based on the number of frames won in the two Q School events. Players who received a bye into the second round were awarded four points for round one. Where players were equal, those who won the most frames in the first event were ranked higher.

The leading players in the Q School Order of Merit are given below. Luke Simmonds and Zhao Xintong tied for the leading position, and were selected at random for a top-up place, where only one was available.

Rank	Player	Event 1	Event 2	Total
T1	(England) Luke Simmonds	19	23	42
T1	(China) Zhao Xintong	19	23	42
3	(England) Adam Duffy	23	15	38
4	(Switzerland) Alexander Ursenbacher	21	15	36
5	(England) Andy Hicks	16	19	35
6	(England) Kuldesh Johal	10	22	32
7	(Republic of Ireland) Leo Fernandez	21	10	31
8	(England) Hammad Miah	11	18	29
9	(England) Ashley Hugill	18	10	28
10	(Republic of Ireland) Greg Casey	10	18	28

== Two-season performance of qualifiers ==
The following table shows the rankings of the 8 qualifiers from the 2015 Q School, at the end of the 2016–17 snooker season, the end of their two guaranteed seasons on the tour, together with their tour status for the 2017–18 snooker season. Players in the top-64 of the rankings retained their place on the tour while those outside the top-64 lost their place unless they qualified under a different category.

Player	End of 2016–17 season		Status for 2017–18 season
Player	Money	Ranking	Status for 2017–18 season
Sydney Wilson (ENG)	17,250	100	Amateur
Daniel Wells (WAL)	63,512	62	Retained place on tour
Eden Sharav (SCO)	30,225	83	Qualified through the one-year list
Rhys Clark (SCO)	42,250	75	Qualified through the one-year list
Jason Weston (ENG)	2,600	124	Amateur
Gareth Allen (WAL)	11,800	110	Amateur
Duane Jones (WAL)	17,612	98	Qualified through the 2017 Q School
Paul Davison (ENG)	22,250	91	Qualified through the 2017 Q School
