= 2016 China Open (snooker) =

BAIC Motor China Open
Tournament information
- Dates: 28 March – 3 April 2016
- Venue: Beijing University Students' Gymnasium
- City: Beijing
- Country: China
- Organisation: World Snooker
- Format: Ranking event
- Total prize fund: £510,000
- Winner's share: £85,000
- Highest break: Stuart Bingham (ENG) (143)

Final
- Champion: Judd Trump (ENG)
- Runner-up: Ricky Walden (ENG)
- Score: 10–4

The 2016 BAIC Motor China Open was a professional ranking snooker tournament, that took place between 28 March and 3 April 2016 at the Beijing University Students' Gymnasium in Beijing, China. It was the ninth ranking event of the 2015–16 season.

Mark Selby was the defending champion, but he withdrew for personal reasons.

Judd Trump defeated Ricky Walden 10–4 in the final to win his fifth career ranking title.

== Prize fund ==
The breakdown of prize money for this year is shown below:

- Winner: £85,000
- Runner-up: £35,000
- Semi-final: £21,000
- Quarter-final: £12,500
- Last 16: £8,000
- Last 32: £6,500
- Last 64: £4,000
- Televised highest break: £2,000
- Total: £510,000

The "rolling 147 prize" for a maximum break stood at £15,000, but was not won.

== Wildcard round ==
These matches were played in Beijing on 28 March 2016.

Match		Score	
WC1	Martin O'Donnell (ENG)	5–0	Wang Yuchen (CHN)
WC2	Andrew Higginson (ENG)	3–5	Yuan Sijun (CHN)
WC3	Tian Pengfei (CHN)	5–1	Niu Zhuang (CHN)
WC4	Ian Burns (ENG)	5–3	Guan Zhen (CHN)

== Main draw ==
Last 64; Best of 9 frames
(Isle of Man) Darryl Hill	5
(Thailand) James Wattana	3
(Wales) Jamie Jones	1
(Wales) Dominic Dale	5
(Wales) Michael White	1
(England) Jack Lisowski	5
(Scotland) Stephen Maguire	5
(England) Gary Wilson	3
(Scotland) Rhys Clark	5
(England) Mark Davis	4
(England) Alfie Burden	5
(England) Joe Perry	0
(England) Mike Dunn	5
(Scotland) Alan McManus	4
(England) Rory McLeod	5
(England) Mitchell Mann	0
(England) Judd Trump	w/o
(England) Stuart Carrington	w/d
(Scotland) Anthony McGill	3
(England) Jimmy Robertson	5
(Hong Kong) Marco Fu	5
(China) Yu De Lu	2
(England) Robert Milkins	5
(Scotland) Ross Muir	4
(England) Chris Wakelin	4
(England) Matthew Selt	5
(Northern Ireland) Joe Swail	2
(England) Martin O'Donnell	5
(England) Mark King	5
(England) Ali Carter	2
(England) David Grace	3
(England) Shaun Murphy	5
(Australia) Neil Robertson	3
(Thailand) Noppon Saengkham	5
(England) Ben Woollaston	w/o
(England) Adam Duffy	w/d
(England) Martin Gould	0
(China) Yuan Sijun	5
(Scotland) Graeme Dott	5
(Wales) Matthew Stevens	1
(Northern Ireland) Gerard Greene	1
(England) David Gilbert	5
(China) Li Hang	3
(Wales) Lee Walker	5
(England) Mark Joyce	5
(Belgium) Luca Brecel	2
(China) Zhou Yuelong	2
(Scotland) John Higgins	5
(England) Barry Hawkins	4
(China) Tian Pengfei	5
(England) Michael Holt	5
(England) Nigel Bond	2
(England) Ricky Walden	w/o
(Finland) Robin Hull	w/d
(Wales) Ryan Day	5
(Thailand) Dechawat Poomjaeng	4
(England) Tom Ford	3
(England) Kyren Wilson	5
(England) Rod Lawler	5
(England) Peter Lines	1
(England) Ian Burns	5
(England) Peter Ebdon	0
(England) Sam Baird	3
(England) Stuart Bingham	5

Last 32; Best of 9 frames
(Isle of Man) Darryl Hill	3
(Wales) Dominic Dale	5
(England) Jack Lisowski	2
(Scotland) Stephen Maguire	5
(Scotland) Rhys Clark	4
(England) Alfie Burden	5
(England) Mike Dunn	2
(England) Rory McLeod	5
(England) Judd Trump	5
(England) Jimmy Robertson	1
(Hong Kong) Marco Fu	5
(England) Robert Milkins	0
(England) Matthew Selt	1
(England) Martin O'Donnell	5
(England) Mark King	5
(England) Shaun Murphy	3
(Thailand) Noppon Saengkham	5
(England) Ben Woollaston	4
(China) Yuan Sijun	2
(Scotland) Graeme Dott	5
(England) David Gilbert	5
(Wales) Lee Walker	1
(England) Mark Joyce	1
(Scotland) John Higgins	5
(China) Tian Pengfei	5
(England) Michael Holt	2
(England) Ricky Walden	5
(Wales) Ryan Day	3
(England) Kyren Wilson	1
(England) Rod Lawler	5
(England) Ian Burns	3
(England) Stuart Bingham	5

Last 16; Best of 9 frames
(Wales) Dominic Dale	1
(Scotland) Stephen Maguire	5
(England) Alfie Burden	5
(England) Rory McLeod	1
(England) Judd Trump	5
(Hong Kong) Marco Fu	1
(England) Martin O'Donnell	0
(England) Mark King	5
(Thailand) Noppon Saengkham	5
(Scotland) Graeme Dott	1
(England) David Gilbert	3
(Scotland) John Higgins	5
(China) Tian Pengfei	4
(England) Ricky Walden	5
(England) Rod Lawler	2
(England) Stuart Bingham	5

Quarter-finals; Best of 9 frames
(Scotland) Stephen Maguire	5
(England) Alfie Burden	1
(England) Judd Trump	5
(England) Mark King	3
(Thailand) Noppon Saengkham	3
(Scotland) John Higgins	5
(England) Ricky Walden	5
(England) Stuart Bingham	1

Semi-finals; Best of 11 frames
(Scotland) Stephen Maguire	0
(England) Judd Trump	6
(Scotland) John Higgins	5
(England) Ricky Walden	6

Final; Best of 19 frames
(England) Judd Trump	10
(England) Ricky Walden	4

== Final ==
Final: Best of 19 frames. Referee: Jan Verhaas. Beijing University Students' Gymnasium, Beijing, China, 3 April 2016.
Judd Trump; England	10–4	Ricky Walden; England
Afternoon: 25–75 (71), 53–63, 65–33, 0–108 (108), 96–4 (90), 60–22, 72–60, 67–28 (59); Evening: 67–40, 68–36, 65–35, 91–35 (69), 8–97 (64), 75–6 (55)
90	Highest break	108
0	Century breaks	1
4	50+ breaks	3

== Qualifying ==
These matches were played from 9–11 February 2016 at the Barnsley Metrodome in Barnsley, England, except for 4 matches which were held over to be played in Beijing on 28 March 2016. All matches were best of 9 frames.

(England) Mark Selby	w/d–w/o	(Isle of Man) Darryl Hill
(Republic of Ireland) David Morris	3–5	(Thailand) James Wattana
(Wales) Jamie Jones	5–0	(China) Lu Chenwei
(Wales) Dominic Dale	5–0	(Egypt) Hatem Yassen
(Wales) Michael White	5–4	(England) Craig Steadman
(England) Jack Lisowski	5–1	(China) Zhang Yong
(Scotland) Stephen Maguire	5–3	(England) Andy Hicks
(England) Gary Wilson	5–1	(England) Paul Davison
(Republic of Ireland) Ken Doherty	0–5	(Scotland) Rhys Clark
(England) Mark Davis	5–0	(England) Steven Hallworth
(England) Robbie Williams	2–5	(England) Alfie Burden
(England) Joe Perry	5–2	(Scotland) Fraser Patrick
(England) Mike Dunn	5–3	(England) Ashley Hugill
(Scotland) Alan McManus	5–4	(England) Sydney Wilson
(England) Rory McLeod	5–4	(England) James Cahill
(Northern Ireland) Mark Allen	2–5	(England) Mitchell Mann
(England) Judd Trump	5–0	(England) Joel Walker
(England) Stuart Carrington	5–1	(China) Lu Ning
(Scotland) Anthony McGill	5–1	(England) Jake Nicholson
(England) Jimmy Robertson	5–0	(Brazil) Itaro Santos
(Hong Kong) Marco Fu	5–2	(Wales) Gareth Allen
(China) Yu De Lu	5–2	(Australia) Vinnie Calabrese
(England) Robert Milkins	5–2	(Wales) Daniel Wells
(Scotland) Jamie Burnett	0–5	(Scotland) Ross Muir
(Norway) Kurt Maflin	3–5	(England) Chris Wakelin
(England) Matthew Selt	5–2	(England) Jamie Cope
(Northern Ireland) Joe Swail	5–3	(England) Ian Glover
(Wales) Mark Williams	3–5	(England) Martin O'Donnell
(England) Mark King	5–2	(Pakistan) Hamza Akbar
(England) Ali Carter	5–1	(Wales) Alex Taubman
(England) David Grace	5–1	(England) Jason Weston
(England) Shaun Murphy	5–1	(England) Zak Surety

(Australia) Neil Robertson	5–3	(Iran) Hossein Vafaei
(England) Oliver Lines	4–5	(Thailand) Noppon Saengkham
(England) Ben Woollaston	5–1	(China) Zhao Xintong
(Thailand) Thepchaiya Un-Nooh	3–5	(England) Adam Duffy
(England) Martin Gould	5–1	(Scotland) Scott Donaldson
(England) Andrew Higginson	5–3	(England) Liam Highfield
(Scotland) Graeme Dott	5–4	(England) Jimmy White
(Wales) Matthew Stevens	5–1	(England) Chris Melling
(Northern Ireland) Gerard Greene	5–4	(England) Oliver Brown
(England) David Gilbert	5–4	(Wales) Duane Jones
(China) Li Hang	5–4	(Malaysia) Thor Chuan Leong
(China) Ding Junhui	1–5 (Note: Match held over and played in Beijing.)	(Wales) Lee Walker
(England) Mark Joyce	5–3	(England) Sean O'Sullivan
(Belgium) Luca Brecel	5–1	(China) Zhang Anda
(China) Zhou Yuelong	5–1	(Northern Ireland) Jordan Brown
(Scotland) John Higgins	5–2	(England) Michael Wasley
(England) Barry Hawkins	5–0	(England) Sanderson Lam
(China) Tian Pengfei	5–3	(Republic of Ireland) Leo Fernandez
(England) Michael Holt	5–1	(England) Matthew Day
(China) Xiao Guodong	2–5	(England) Nigel Bond
(England) Ricky Walden	5–4	(England) Barry Pinches
(Finland) Robin Hull	5–1	(Scotland) Eden Sharav
(Wales) Ryan Day	5–1	(England) Brett Miller
(Thailand) Dechawat Poomjaeng	5–4	(Scotland) Michael Leslie
(England) Tom Ford	5–2	(England) Michael Wild
(England) Kyren Wilson	5–3	(England) Anthony Hamilton
(England) Rod Lawler	5–4	(England) Hammad Miah
(China) Liang Wenbo	2–5	(England) Peter Lines
(Republic of Ireland) Fergal O'Brien	4–5	(England) Ian Burns
(England) Peter Ebdon	5–4	(England) Michael Georgiou
(England) Sam Baird	5–3	(England) Allan Taylor
(England) Stuart Bingham	5–0	(China) Cao Yupeng

== Century breaks ==
=== Qualifying stage centuries ===
- 142, 108 – Ryan Day
- 140 – Joe Perry
- 137, 123 – Anthony Hamilton
- 136, 104 – Shaun Murphy
- 135 – Tian Pengfei
- 132 – Jamie Cope
- 132 – Neil Robertson
- 129 – Marco Fu
- 128, 109 – Barry Hawkins
- 125, 108, 103, 100 – Kyren Wilson
- 125 – Lu Ning
- 124 – Chris Wakelin
- 123 – Noppon Saengkham
- 121 – John Higgins
- 115 – Matthew Stevens
- 113 – Dominic Dale
- 110 – Dechawat Poomjaeng
- 108 – Judd Trump
- 106, 100 – Michael Holt
- 104 – Rhys Clark
- 104 – Peter Ebdon
- 104 – Stephen Maguire
- 103, 100 – Ben Woollaston
- 103 – Michael Georgiou
- 103 – Robert Milkins
- 102 – Mitchell Mann
- 101 – Mark Joyce
- 100 – Eden Sharav
- 100 – Mark Allen

=== Televised stage centuries ===
- 143, 128, 119, 109 – Stuart Bingham
- 136 – Ding Junhui
- 135 – Ian Burns
- 135, 131, 113, 108 – Ricky Walden
- 133, 108 – Tian Pengfei
- 123, 115, 111 – Marco Fu
- 120, 103 – Zhou Yuelong
- 117, 116 – Alfie Burden
- 116 – Mark Joyce
- 115, 102 – David Gilbert
- 114 – John Higgins
- 110, 109, 100 – Judd Trump
- 109, 105, 101 – Dominic Dale
- 106, 106 – Neil Robertson
- 106 – Ben Woollaston
- 105 – Alan McManus
- 102 – Yuan Sijun
- 101 – Stephen Maguire
- 101 – Ryan Day
- 100 – Michael Holt
- 100 – Anthony McGill
