= 2017 Gibraltar Open =

Snooker tournament

2017 jojobet.com Gibraltar Open
Tournament information
- Dates: 1–5 March 2017
- Venue: Tercentenary Sports Hall
- City: Gibraltar
- Organisation: World Snooker
- Format: Ranking event
- Total prize fund: €125,000
- Winner's share: €25,000
- Highest break: Jack Lisowski (ENG) (145)

Final
- Champion: Shaun Murphy (ENG)
- Runner-up: Judd Trump (ENG)
- Score: 4–2

The 2017 Gibraltar Open (officially the 2017 jojobet.com Gibraltar Open) was a professional ranking snooker tournament that took place from 1 to 5 March 2017, at the Tercentenary Sports Hall in Gibraltar. It was the 16th ranking event of the 2016/2017 season. The main event ran from 3 to 5 March and was preceded by amateur pre-qualifying rounds on 1 and 2 March.

Marco Fu was the defending champion, but he chose not to participate in this edition of the tournament.

Shaun Murphy won the tournament, beating Judd Trump 4–2 in the final.

== Prize fund ==
The breakdown of prize money for this year is shown below.

- Winner: €25,000
- Runner-up: €12,000
- Semi-finals: €6,000
- Quarter-finals: €4,000
- Last 16: €2,300
- Last 32: €1,200
- Last 64: €700
- Total: €125,000

The "rolling 147 prize" for a maximum break stood at £20,000 (€26,600).

== Main draw ==
Main rounds draw

=== Top half ===
==== Section 1 ====
Last 128; Best of 7 frames
(Wales) Matthew Stevens	3
(Wales) Michael White	4
(Norway) Kurt Maflin	4
(Pakistan) Hamza Akbar	0
(England) Oliver Lines	3
(England) Charlie Walters	4
(England) Barry Hawkins	4
(England) Jeff Cundy	0
(Republic of Ireland) Ken Doherty	w/d
(England) Shaun Murphy	w/o
(England) Sam Craigie	4
(England) John Foster	0
(England) Allan Taylor	4
(England) Saqib Nasir	3
(England) Elliot Slessor	4
(Republic of Ireland) Josh Boileau	0

Last 64; Best of 7 frames
(Wales) Michael White	4
(Norway) Kurt Maflin	0
(England) Charlie Walters	1
(England) Barry Hawkins	4
(England) Shaun Murphy	4
(England) Sam Craigie	1
(England) Allan Taylor	4
(England) Elliot Slessor	2

Last 32; Best of 7 frames
(Wales) Michael White	2
(England) Barry Hawkins	4
(England) Shaun Murphy	4
(England) Allan Taylor	3

Last 16; Best of 7 frames
(England) Barry Hawkins	1
(England) Shaun Murphy	4

==== Section 2 ====
Last 128; Best of 7 frames
(England) Jimmy Robertson	4
(Wales) Ben Jones	2
(England) Paul Davison	3
(Wales) Lee Walker	4
(England) Mark Davis	4
(England) Mark Joyce	2
(England) Robbie Williams	3
(Wales) David John	4
(China) Zhao Xintong	4
(Belgium) Laurens De Staelen	0
(Northern Ireland) Joe Swail	2
(England) Martin O'Donnell	4
(Wales) Mark Williams	4
(England) Adam Edge	1
(England) Andrew Higginson	2
(China) Zhang Yong	4

Last 64; Best of 7 frames
(England) Jimmy Robertson	0
(Wales) Lee Walker	4
(England) Mark Davis	4
(Wales) David John	3
(China) Zhao Xintong	4
(England) Martin O'Donnell	2
(Wales) Mark Williams	4
(China) Zhang Yong	2

Last 32; Best of 7 frames
(Wales) Lee Walker	3
(England) Mark Davis	4
(China) Zhao Xintong	3
(Wales) Mark Williams	4

Last 16; Best of 7 frames
(England) Mark Davis	3
(Wales) Mark Williams	4

==== Section 3 ====
Last 128; Best of 7 frames
(England) Alfie Burden	4
(England) Ian Burns	2
(Scotland) Anthony McGill	4
(England) Joe O'Connor	2
(England) Mike Dunn	4
(England) Michael Wild	2
(China) Zhou Yuelong	4
(England) James Cahill	0
(China) Liang Wenbo	1
(England) Ricky Walden	4
(China) Yan Bingtao	4
(England) Ashley Carty	1
(England) Robert Milkins	4
(England) Christopher Keogan	2
(England) Adam Duffy	1
(England) Mark Selby	4

Last 64; Best of 7 frames
(England) Alfie Burden	4
(Scotland) Anthony McGill	2
(England) Mike Dunn	0
(China) Zhou Yuelong	4
(England) Ricky Walden	4
(China) Yan Bingtao	3
(England) Robert Milkins	3
(England) Mark Selby	4

Last 32; Best of 7 frames
(England) Alfie Burden	4
(China) Zhou Yuelong	2
(England) Ricky Walden	4
(England) Mark Selby	3

Last 16; Best of 7 frames
(England) Alfie Burden	4
(England) Ricky Walden	3

==== Section 4 ====
Last 128; Best of 7 frames
(England) Gary Wilson	4
(England) Peter Lines	3
(Malaysia) Thor Chuan Leong	4
(Wales) Matthew Roberts	0
(Scotland) Fraser Patrick	4
(England) Stephen Kershaw	2
(England) Sydney Wilson	1
(Brazil) Igor Figueiredo	4
(Isle of Man) Darryl Hill	0
(England) Steven Hallworth	4
(England) Nigel Bond	4
(India) Aditya Mehta	3
(Wales) Daniel Wells	4
(England) Kyren Wilson	3
(China) Fang Xiongman	4
(England) Mitchell Grinstead	1

Last 64; Best of 7 frames
(England) Gary Wilson	1
(Malaysia) Thor Chuan Leong	4
(Scotland) Fraser Patrick	3
(Brazil) Igor Figueiredo	4
(England) Steven Hallworth	1
(England) Nigel Bond	4
(Wales) Daniel Wells	4
(China) Fang Xiongman	3

Last 32; Best of 7 frames
(Malaysia) Thor Chuan Leong	3
(Brazil) Igor Figueiredo	4
(England) Nigel Bond	4
(Wales) Daniel Wells	0

Last 16; Best of 7 frames
(Brazil) Igor Figueiredo	2
(England) Nigel Bond	4

=== Bottom half ===
==== Section 5 ====
Last 128; Best of 7 frames
(Scotland) Ross Muir	0
(Northern Ireland) Mark Allen	4
(Wales) Dominic Dale	0
(Scotland) John Higgins	4
(Iran) Hossein Vafaei	1
(England) David Gilbert	4
(China) Ding Junhui	4
(England) Jason Weston	1
(England) Anthony Hamilton	w/o
(England) Stuart Carrington	w/d
(China) Tian Pengfei	4
(England) Liam Highfield	2
(England) Mark King	4
(England) Simon Dent	3
(England) Jack Lisowski	w/o
(Brazil) Itaro Santos	w/d

Last 64; Best of 7 frames
(Northern Ireland) Mark Allen	4
(Scotland) John Higgins	1
(England) David Gilbert	4
(China) Ding Junhui	3
(England) Anthony Hamilton	4
(China) Tian Pengfei	2
(England) Mark King	2
(England) Jack Lisowski	4

Last 32; Best of 7 frames
(Northern Ireland) Mark Allen	4
(England) David Gilbert	1
(England) Anthony Hamilton	0
(England) Jack Lisowski	4

Last 16; Best of 7 frames
(Northern Ireland) Mark Allen	1
(England) Jack Lisowski	4

==== Section 6 ====
Last 128; Best of 7 frames
(Scotland) Stephen Maguire	4
(Northern Ireland) Gerard Greene	3
(England) Matthew Selt	4
(England) Rory McLeod	0
(England) Jamie Curtis-Barrett	0
(England) Judd Trump	4
(England) Craig Steadman	4
(England) Brandon Sargeant	1
(Scotland) Scott Donaldson	1
(England) Tom Ford	4
(England) Peter Ebdon	4
(Wales) Jamie Clarke	0
(China) Wang Yuchen	3
(England) Sanderson Lam	4
(China) Zhang Anda	3
(Thailand) Noppon Saengkham	4

Last 64; Best of 7 frames
(Scotland) Stephen Maguire	2
(England) Matthew Selt	4
(England) Judd Trump	4
(England) Craig Steadman	1
(England) Tom Ford	0
(England) Peter Ebdon	4
(England) Sanderson Lam	4
(Thailand) Noppon Saengkham	1

Last 32; Best of 7 frames
(England) Matthew Selt	1
(England) Judd Trump	4
(England) Peter Ebdon	1
(England) Sanderson Lam	4

Last 16; Best of 7 frames
(England) Judd Trump	4
(England) Sanderson Lam	1

==== Section 7 ====
Last 128; Best of 7 frames
(England) Jamie Cope	2
(Wales) Duane Jones	4
(Belgium) Luca Brecel	4
(England) Martin Pitcher	1
(England) Michael Holt	4
(England) Ian Martin	3
(Wales) Ryan Day	4
(England) Phil O'Kane	0
(Republic of Ireland) Fergal O'Brien	3
(England) Ben Woollaston	4
(Scotland) Eden Sharav	4
(England) Sam Baird	1
(England) John Astley	4
(Austria) Andreas Ploner	1
(Cyprus) Michael Georgiou	3
(England) George Pragnall	4

Last 64; Best of 7 frames
(Wales) Duane Jones	0
(Belgium) Luca Brecel	4
(England) Michael Holt	2
(Wales) Ryan Day	4
(England) Ben Woollaston	4
(Scotland) Eden Sharav	2
(England) John Astley	4
(England) George Pragnall	1

Last 32; Best of 7 frames
(Belgium) Luca Brecel	3
(Wales) Ryan Day	4
(England) Ben Woollaston	1
(England) John Astley	4

Last 16; Best of 7 frames
(Wales) Ryan Day	4
(England) John Astley	2

==== Section 8 ====
Last 128; Best of 7 frames
(Scotland) Rhys Clark	4
(England) Sean O'Sullivan	1
(England) Mitchell Mann	4
(England) David Grace	3
(Wales) Gareth Allen	1
(England) Chris Wakelin	4
(Australia) Neil Robertson	4
(England) Jaspal Bamotra	0
(England) Jimmy White	4
(Australia) Kurt Dunham	1
(England) Joe Perry	4
(England) Zack Richardson	2
(England) Hammad Miah	4
(England) Dan Barsley	0
(China) Mei Xiwen	1
(Wales) Jamie Jones	4

Last 64; Best of 7 frames
(Scotland) Rhys Clark	4
(England) Mitchell Mann	3
(England) Chris Wakelin	2
(Australia) Neil Robertson	4
(England) Jimmy White	2
(England) Joe Perry	4
(England) Hammad Miah	0
(Wales) Jamie Jones	4

Last 32; Best of 7 frames
(Scotland) Rhys Clark	2
(Australia) Neil Robertson	4
(England) Joe Perry	1
(Wales) Jamie Jones	4

Last 16; Best of 7 frames
(Australia) Neil Robertson	4
(Wales) Jamie Jones	0

=== Finals ===
Quarter-finals; Best of 7 frames
(England) Shaun Murphy	4
(Wales) Mark Williams	3
(England) Alfie Burden	3
(England) Nigel Bond	4
(England) Jack Lisowski	1
(England) Judd Trump	4
(Wales) Ryan Day	4
(Australia) Neil Robertson	2

Semi-finals; Best of 7 frames
(England) Shaun Murphy	4
(England) Nigel Bond	0
(England) Judd Trump	4
(Wales) Ryan Day	2

Final; Best of 7 frames
(England) Shaun Murphy	4
(England) Judd Trump	2

=== Final ===
Final: Best of 7 frames. Referee: Peggy Li; Tercentenary Sports Hall, Gibraltar, 5 March 2017.
Shaun Murphy; England	4–2	Judd Trump; England
0–117 (59), 83–45, 0–84 (84), 75–7 (60), 76–56 (56, 56), 96–34 (96)
96	Highest break	84
0	Century breaks	0
3	50+ breaks	3

== Preliminary rounds ==
These matches were played in Gibraltar on 1–2 March 2017. All matches were the best of 7 frames.

=== Round 1 ===
- Match 1: (Germany) Simon Lichtenberg 4–0 (Bulgaria) Ivelin Boyanov Bozhanov
- Match 2: (England) Jeff Cundy 4–3 (England) Oliver Brown
- Match 3: (Wales) Thomas Rees 0–4 (England) Barry Pinches
- Match 4: (England) John Foster 4–0 (Spain) David Alcaide
- Match 5: (England) Sam Harvey 1–4 (Scotland) Michael Collumb
- Match 6: (Germany) Daniel Schneider 4–2 (England) Matthew Glasby
- Match 7: (England) Joe Steele 4–1 (Gibraltar) Andrew Olivero
- Match 8: (England) Ryan Causton w/o–n/s (Qatar) Nader Al Dosari
- Match 9: (England) Joe O'Connor 4–2 (Republic of Ireland) Greg Casey
- Match 10: (England) David Lilley 3–4 (Republic of Ireland) Charlie Sweeney
- Match 11: (England) Joshua Cooper 4–0 (Northern Ireland) Conor McCormack
- Match 12: (Wales) Alex Taubman 4–2 (England) Michael Williams

- Match 13: (England) Danny Connolly 4–3 (England) Matthew Day
- Match 14: (Republic of Ireland) Daniel O'Regan 4–1 (Belgium) Jurian Heusdens
- Match 15: (England) Steven Hallworth 4–0 (Gibraltar) Francis Becerra
- Match 16: (England) Mark Vincent 4–3 (England) James Budd
- Match 17: (England) Simon Dent 4–0 (England) Mike Collins
- Match 18: (England) Lee Prickman 4–3 (England) John Fearick
- Match 19: (England) Joshua Thomond 0–4 (Northern Ireland) Gerard Greene
- Match 20: (Denmark) Ejler Hame 1–4 (England) Ian Glover

- Match 21: (England) Richard Beckham 1–4 (England) Brandon Sargeant
- Match 22: (England) Jenson Kendrick 1–4 (Wales) Jamie Clarke
- Match 23: (England) Ben Murphy 4–2 (Poland) Adam Stefanow
- Match 24: (England) Sean McAllister 2–4 (Germany) Robin Otto
- Match 25: (England) Manasawin Phetmalaikul 1–4 (England) Ian Martin
- Match 26: (England) Nev Graham 2–4 (England) Phil O'Kane
- Match 27: (Austria) Andreas Ploner w/o–n/s (Morocco) Mourad Naitali
- Match 28: (Belgium) Hans Blanckaert 3–4 (Spain) Francisco Sánchez Ruiz

- Match 29: (Germany) Felix Frede 0–4 (England) George Pragnall
- Match 30: (South Africa) Paul Burrell 4–0 (England) Andrew Urbaniak
- Match 31: (England) Zack Richardson 4–0 (England) Bhavesh Sodha
- Match 32: (England) James Dabell 4–1 (England) Rees Carter
- Match 33: (England) Adam Longley 2–4 (England) Dan Barsley

=== Round 2 ===
- Match 34: (England) Charlie Walters 4–2 (Germany) Simon Lichtenberg
- Match 35: (England) Louis Heathcote 2–4 (England) Jeff Cundy
- Match 36: (England) Barry Pinches 3–4 (England) John Foster

- Match 37: (England) Saqib Nasir 4–1 (Scotland) Michael Collumb
- Match 38: (Wales) Ben Jones 4–0 (Germany) Daniel Schneider
- Match 39: (Belgium) Laurens De Staelen 4–1 (England) Joe Steele
- Match 40: (England) Adam Edge 4–0 (England) Ryan Causton
- Match 41: (England) Joe O'Connor 4–3 (Republic of Ireland) Charlie Sweeney
- Match 42: (England) Ashley Carty 4–0 (England) Joshua Cooper
- Match 43: (England) Peter Lines 4–0 (Wales) Alex Taubman
- Match 44: (Wales) Matthew Roberts 4–3 (England) Danny Connolly

- Match 45: (England) Stephen Kershaw 4–3 (Republic of Ireland) Daniel O'Regan
- Match 46: (Bulgaria) Boris Lazarkov 0–4 (England) Steven Hallworth
- Match 47: (England) Mitchell Grinstead 4–0 (England) Mark Vincent
- Match 48: (England) Simon Dent 4–3 (England) Lee Prickman
- Match 49: (Northern Ireland) Gerard Greene 4–2 (England) Ian Glover
- Match 50: (England) Patrick Whelan 2–4 (England) Brandon Sargeant
- Match 51: (England) Joel Walker 2–4 (Wales) Jamie Clarke
- Match 52: (England) Martin Pitcher 4–1 (England) Ben Murphy

- Match 53: (Germany) Robin Otto 1–4 (England) Ian Martin
- Match 54: (England) Daniel Devlin w/d–w/o (England) Phil O'Kane
- Match 55: (England) Ashley Hugill 1–4 (Austria) Andreas Ploner
- Match 56: (Spain) Francisco Sánchez Ruíz 0–4 (England) George Pragnall
- Match 57: (England) Jaspal Bamotra 4–2 (South Africa) Paul Burrell
- Match 58: (England) Zack Richardson 4–0 (England) James Dabell
- Match 59: (England) Kaif Shazad 0–4 (England) Dan Barsley

== Century breaks ==
=== Main rounds centuries ===
Total: 48

- 145, 129, 106, 104 – Jack Lisowski
- 140, 137, 122 – Shaun Murphy
- 138, 135, 101 – Mark Allen
- 136 – Sam Craigie
- 136 – Luca Brecel
- 135 – John Astley
- 133, 131, 109, 102 – Alfie Burden
- 132, 102 – Ricky Walden
- 131 – David John
- 130, 108, 101 – Neil Robertson
- 129, 117, 102 – Ryan Day
- 129, 114, 112, 103 – Judd Trump
- 128, 102 – Gary Wilson
- 128 – Gerard Greene
- 127 – Mark Davis
- 127 – Zhou Yuelong
- 121 – John Higgins
- 118 – Zhang Yong
- 107 – Michael White
- 107 – Ben Woollaston
- 107 – Zhang Anda
- 105, 100 – Barry Hawkins
- 105 – Jamie Jones
- 104 – Fang Xiongman
- 102 – Mark Williams
- 102 – Charlie Walters
- 101 – Mitchell Mann
- 100 – Steven Hallworth
