= 2016 English Open (snooker) =

2016 Coral English Open
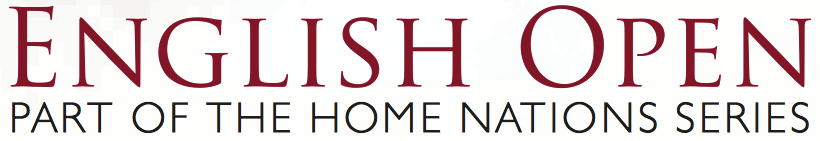

Tournament information
- Dates: 10–16 October 2016
- Venue: EventCity
- City: Manchester
- Country: England
- Organisation: World Snooker
- Format: Ranking event
- Total prize fund: £366,000
- Winner's share: £70,000
- Highest break: Alfie Burden (ENG) (147)

Final
- Champion: Liang Wenbo (CHN)
- Runner-up: Judd Trump (ENG)
- Score: 9–6

The 2016 English Open (officially the 2016 BetVictor English Open) was a professional ranking snooker tournament that took place between 10 and 16 October 2016 at the EventCity in Manchester, England. It was the seventh ranking event of the 2016/2017 season.

This was the inaugural English Open event, being held as part of a new Home Nations Series introduced in the 2016/2017 season with the existing Welsh Open and new Northern Ireland Open and Scottish Open tournaments. The winner of the English Open is awarded the Davis Trophy which is named in honour of six-time world champion Steve Davis.

Liang Wenbo captured his only ranking title by beating Judd Trump 9–6 in the final. As a result, he qualified for the Champion of Champions in November.

Alfie Burden made the 122nd official maximum break in the sixth frame of his first round match against Daniel Wells. It was Burden's first professional maximum break.

== Prize fund ==
The breakdown of prize money for this year is shown below:

- Winner: £70,000
- Runner-up: £30,000
- Semi-final: £20,000
- Quarter-final: £10,000
- Last 16: £6,000
- Last 32: £3,500
- Last 64: £2,500
- Highest break: £2,000
- Total: £366,000

The "rolling 147 prize" for a maximum break stood at £10,000.

== Main draw ==
=== Top half ===
==== Section 1 ====
Last 128; Best of 7 frames
(England) Mark Selby (1)	4
(England) Gary Wilson	0
(England) Sam Craigie	w/d
(England) Liam Highfield	w/o
(Wales) Gareth Allen	3
(Scotland) Stephen Maguire	4
(Wales) Ryan Day	4
(Norway) Kurt Maflin	1
(England) Barry Hawkins (16)	4
(England) Jack Lisowski	3
(England) Mark Davis	4
(China) Tian Pengfei	1
(Wales) Dominic Dale	2
(England) David Grace	4
(England) Andrew Higginson	4
(England) Nigel Bond	1

Last 64; Best of 7 frames
(England) Mark Selby (1)	3
(England) Liam Highfield	4
(Scotland) Stephen Maguire	3
(Wales) Ryan Day	4
(England) Barry Hawkins (16)	4
(England) Mark Davis	2
(England) David Grace	4
(England) Andrew Higginson	3

Last 32; Best of 7 frames
(England) Liam Highfield	1
(Wales) Ryan Day	4
(England) Barry Hawkins (16)	4
(England) David Grace	1

Last 16; Best of 7 frames
(Wales) Ryan Day	1
(England) Barry Hawkins (16)	4

==== Section 2 ====
Last 128; Best of 7 frames
(Wales) Michael White	4
(England) Jason Weston	0
(Thailand) Boonyarit Keattikun	3
(Thailand) Kritsanut Lertsattayathorn	4
(Malta) Alex Borg	0
(China) Li Hang	4
(England) Ricky Walden (9)	4
(Finland) Robin Hull	1
(Thailand) Dechawat Poomjaeng	2
(England) John Astley	4
(China) Yan Bingtao	4
(England) Sanderson Lam	2
(England) Sean O'Sullivan	2
(Scotland) Scott Donaldson	4
(Northern Ireland) Mark Allen (8)	4
(England) Jamie Curtis-Barrett	1

Last 64; Best of 7 frames
(Wales) Michael White	1
(Thailand) Kritsanut Lertsattayathorn	4
(China) Li Hang	3
(England) Ricky Walden (9)	4
(England) John Astley	0
(China) Yan Bingtao	4
(Scotland) Scott Donaldson	1
(Northern Ireland) Mark Allen (8)	4

Last 32; Best of 7 frames
(Thailand) Kritsanut Lertsattayathorn	3
(England) Ricky Walden (9)	4
(China) Yan Bingtao	4
(Northern Ireland) Mark Allen (8)	3

Last 16; Best of 7 frames
(England) Ricky Walden (9)	4
(China) Yan Bingtao	1

==== Section 3 ====
Last 128; Best of 7 frames
(Scotland) John Higgins (5)	4
(England) Michael Wild	2
(England) Mark King	4
(Malaysia) Rory Thor	3
(Scotland) Fraser Patrick	4
(England) Zak Surety	1
(Scotland) Eden Sharav	1
(Thailand) James Wattana	4
(Hong Kong) Marco Fu (12)	4
(England) Martin O'Donnell	3
(England) Rory McLeod	2
(England) Tom Ford	4
(Brazil) Itaro Santos	1
(Northern Ireland) Joe Swail	4
(England) James Cahill	4
(Poland) Adam Stefanow	3

Last 64; Best of 7 frames
(Scotland) John Higgins (5)	4
(England) Mark King	1
(Scotland) Fraser Patrick	4
(Thailand) James Wattana	2
(Hong Kong) Marco Fu (12)	2
(England) Tom Ford	4
(Northern Ireland) Joe Swail	4
(England) James Cahill	1

Last 32; Best of 7 frames
(Scotland) John Higgins (5)	4
(Scotland) Fraser Patrick	3
(England) Tom Ford	4
(Northern Ireland) Joe Swail	2

Last 16; Best of 7 frames
(Scotland) John Higgins (5)	4
(England) Tom Ford	1

==== Section 4 ====
Last 128; Best of 7 frames
(England) Oliver Lines	1
(Wales) Ian Preece	4
(England) Mark Joyce	3
(England) Craig Steadman	4
(England) Ian Burns	4
(England) Christopher Keogan	2
(Wales) Mark Williams (13)	4
(Wales) David John	2
(England) Martin Gould	4
(England) Sydney Wilson	1
(China) Zhou Yuelong	4
(England) Jimmy White	3
(Wales) Matthew Stevens	1
(England) Jamie Bodle	4
(England) Judd Trump (4)	4
(Republic of Ireland) Ken Doherty	1

Last 64; Best of 7 frames
(Wales) Ian Preece	4
(England) Craig Steadman	1
(England) Ian Burns	1
(Wales) Mark Williams (13)	4
(England) Martin Gould	4
(China) Zhou Yuelong	2
(England) Jamie Bodle	3
(England) Judd Trump (4)	4

Last 32; Best of 7 frames
(Wales) Ian Preece	1
(Wales) Mark Williams (13)	4
(England) Martin Gould	1
(England) Judd Trump (4)	4

Last 16; Best of 7 frames
(Wales) Mark Williams (13)	0
(England) Judd Trump (4)	4

=== Bottom half ===
==== Section 5 ====
Last 128; Best of 7 frames
(England) Shaun Murphy (3)	4
(China) Chen Zhe	0
(China) Liang Wenbo	4
(Scotland) Graeme Dott	0
(England) Robbie Williams	0
(Republic of Ireland) Fergal O'Brien	4
(Scotland) Ross Muir	4
(China) Zhang Yong	3
(England) Ali Carter (14)	4
(Belgium) Luca Brecel	3
(Thailand) Sunny Akani	4
(Australia) Kurt Dunham	0
(England) Ben Woollaston	4
(China) Cao Yupeng	1
(Republic of Ireland) Josh Boileau	2
(China) Zhang Anda	4

Last 64; Best of 7 frames
(England) Shaun Murphy (3)	3
(China) Liang Wenbo	4
(Republic of Ireland) Fergal O'Brien	4
(Scotland) Ross Muir	2
(England) Ali Carter (14)	4
(Thailand) Sunny Akani	3
(England) Ben Woollaston	4
(China) Zhang Anda	3

Last 32; Best of 7 frames
(China) Liang Wenbo	4
(Republic of Ireland) Fergal O'Brien	2
(England) Ali Carter (14)	2
(England) Ben Woollaston	4

Last 16; Best of 7 frames
(China) Liang Wenbo	4
(England) Ben Woollaston	3

==== Section 6 ====
Last 128; Best of 7 frames
(China) Yu Delu	1
(England) Rod Lawler	4
(England) Peter Ebdon	1
(England) Stuart Carrington	4
(England) Adam Duffy	1
(England) Anthony Hamilton	4
(England) Joe Perry (11)	2
(England) Matthew Selt	4
(England) Sam Baird	3
(England) Elliot Slessor	4
(Wales) Jak Jones	4
(England) Brandon Sargeant	0
(Isle of Man) Darryl Hill	1
(China) Mei Xiwen	4
(China) Ding Junhui (6)	4
(England) Mitchell Mann	0

Last 64; Best of 7 frames
(England) Rod Lawler	3
(England) Stuart Carrington	4
(England) Anthony Hamilton	4
(England) Matthew Selt	2
(England) Elliot Slessor	3
(Wales) Jak Jones	4
(China) Mei Xiwen	0
(China) Ding Junhui (6)	4

Last 32; Best of 7 frames
(England) Stuart Carrington	1
(England) Anthony Hamilton	4
(Wales) Jak Jones	4
(China) Ding Junhui (6)	2

Last 16; Best of 7 frames
(England) Anthony Hamilton	4
(Wales) Jak Jones	3

==== Section 7 ====
Last 128; Best of 7 frames
(Australia) Neil Robertson (7)	4
(Pakistan) Hamza Akbar	1
(England) Mike Dunn	0
(Wales) Duane Jones	4
(Thailand) Noppon Saengkham	4
(Cyprus) Michael Georgiou	1
(England) Michael Holt	1
(China) Xiao Guodong	4
(England) Ronnie O'Sullivan (10)	4
(England) Jimmy Robertson	0
(China) Zhao Xintong	4
(China) Wang Yuchen	0
(Scotland) Anthony McGill	4
(England) Jamie Cope	2
(England) Chris Wakelin	4
(England) Allan Taylor	3

Last 64; Best of 7 frames
(Australia) Neil Robertson (7)	4
(Wales) Duane Jones	1
(Thailand) Noppon Saengkham	0
(China) Xiao Guodong	4
(England) Ronnie O'Sullivan (10)	4
(China) Zhao Xintong	3
(Scotland) Anthony McGill	1
(England) Chris Wakelin	4

Last 32; Best of 7 frames
(Australia) Neil Robertson (7)	3
(China) Xiao Guodong	4
(England) Ronnie O'Sullivan (10)	3
(England) Chris Wakelin	4

Last 16; Best of 7 frames
(China) Xiao Guodong	3
(England) Chris Wakelin	4

==== Section 8 ====
Last 128; Best of 7 frames
(India) Aditya Mehta	3
(Wales) Lee Walker	4
(Wales) Jamie Jones	w/d
(Scotland) Rhys Clark	w/o
(England) Alfie Burden	3
(Wales) Daniel Wells	4
(England) Kyren Wilson (15)	4
(England) Wayne Townsend	0
(England) Hammad Miah	1
(England) David Gilbert	4
(England) Peter Lines	4
(England) Paul Davison	1
(Scotland) Alan McManus	4
(Thailand) Thepchaiya Un-Nooh	1
(England) Stuart Bingham (2)	4
(England) Robert Milkins	3

Last 64; Best of 7 frames
(Wales) Lee Walker	2
(Scotland) Rhys Clark	4
(Wales) Daniel Wells	1
(England) Kyren Wilson (15)	4
(England) David Gilbert	4
(England) Peter Lines	0
(Scotland) Alan McManus	2
(England) Stuart Bingham (2)	4

Last 32; Best of 7 frames
(Scotland) Rhys Clark	4
(England) Kyren Wilson (15)	3
(England) David Gilbert	0
(England) Stuart Bingham (2)	4

Last 16; Best of 7 frames
(Scotland) Rhys Clark	1
(England) Stuart Bingham (2)	4

=== Finals ===
Quarter-finals; Best of 9 frames
(England) Barry Hawkins (16)	5
(England) Ricky Walden (9)	2
(Scotland) John Higgins (5)	1
(England) Judd Trump (4)	5
(China) Liang Wenbo	5
(England) Anthony Hamilton	2
(England) Chris Wakelin	0
(England) Stuart Bingham (2)	5

Semi-finals; Best of 11 frames
(England) Barry Hawkins (16)	2
(England) Judd Trump (4)	6
(China) Liang Wenbo	6
(England) Stuart Bingham (2)	5

Final; Best of 17 frames
(England) Judd Trump (4)	6
(China) Liang Wenbo	9

== Final ==
Final: Best of 17 frames. Referee: Greg Coniglio. EventCity, Manchester, England, 16 October 2016.
Judd Trump (4); England	6–9	Liang Wenbo; China
Afternoon: 9–126 (95), 0–95 (95), 63–2, 76–45 (54), 0–88 (76), 0–96 (92), 62–69 (Trump 51), 67–13 (52); Evening: 132–0 (132), 0–84 (84), 0–115 (98), 69–31 (51), 69–0 (50), 41–69 (62), 51–75
132	Highest break	98
1	Century breaks	0
6	50+ breaks	7

== Century breaks ==
- 147 – Alfie Burden
- 140 – Li Hang
- 139, 125, 121, 102 – Neil Robertson
- 138, 136, 136, 134, 106 – Liang Wenbo
- 138 – Ali Carter
- 138 – Mark Williams
- 136 – Tian Pengfei
- 135, 106, 102 – Xiao Guodong
- 134, 132, 120 – Judd Trump
- 134 – Joe Perry
- 132 – Mark Allen
- 130, 107 – Zhao Xintong
- 130, 106 – Chris Wakelin
- 130 – Zhang Anda
- 126, 117, 110 – Stephen Maguire
- 126 – Kritsanut Lertsattayathorn
- 125 – Mark Joyce
- 122 – Anthony McGill
- 121 – Ian Preece
- 118, 103 – Kyren Wilson
- 116, 116 – Stuart Bingham
- 116, 115 – Ricky Walden
- 115 – Martin Gould
- 114, 103 – John Higgins
- 114 – Barry Hawkins
- 113 – Zhou Yuelong
- 112 – Scott Donaldson
- 111, 102 – David Gilbert
- 111 – Duane Jones
- 110 – Ronnie O'Sullivan
- 108, 106 – Ding Junhui
- 108 – Shaun Murphy
- 107 – Ben Woollaston
- 107 – Tom Ford
- 105 – Michael Holt
- 105 – Ross Muir
- 104 – Allan Taylor
- 103, 100 – Marco Fu
- 101 – Rory McLeod
- 100 – Ryan Day
- 100 – Rod Lawler
