= 2016 Welsh Open (snooker) =

2016 BetVictor Welsh Open
Tournament information
- Dates: 15–21 February 2016
- Venue: Motorpoint Arena
- City: Cardiff
- Country: Wales
- Organisation: World Snooker
- Format: Ranking event
- Total prize fund: £324,000
- Winner's share: £60,000
- Highest break: Ding Junhui (CHN) (147)

Final
- Champion: Ronnie O'Sullivan (ENG)
- Runner-up: Neil Robertson (AUS)
- Score: 9–5

The 2016 Welsh Open (officially the 2016 BetVictor Welsh Open) was a professional ranking snooker tournament held at the Motorpoint Arena in Cardiff from 15 to 21 February 2016. It was the sixth ranking event of the 2015/2016 season.

The defending champion John Higgins lost 1–4 against Michael White in the last 16.

Playing Barry Pinches in the first round, Ronnie O'Sullivan declined the opportunity to make a maximum break, describing the £10,000 prize money on offer as "too cheap". He potted the pink off the penultimate red and made a 146. World Snooker chairman Barry Hearn called O'Sullivan's actions "unacceptable" and "disrespectful".

Ding Junhui made the 117th official maximum break in the sixth frame of his quarter-final against Neil Robertson. It was Ding's sixth maximum break in professional competition.

O'Sullivan met Robertson in the final. From 2–5 behind, O'Sullivan won seven frames in a row, finishing with a break of 141 in the 14th frame, to defeat Robertson 9–5 and equal John Higgins's record of four Welsh Open titles. It was O'Sullivan's 28th ranking title, which put him in joint second place with Higgins and Steve Davis for the number of career ranking titles.

== Prize fund ==
The breakdown of prize money is shown below:

- Winner: £60,000
- Runner-up: £30,000
- Semi-finals: £20,000
- Quarter-finals: £10,000
- Last 16: £5,000
- Last 32: £3,000
- Last 64: £2,000
- Highest break: £2,000
- Total: £324,000

The "rolling 147 prize" for a maximum break was £10,000 (2nd ranking event since it was last won, £5,000 added for each ranking event)

== Main draw ==
128 players started the tournament with 12 tables in the arena in the early stages.

=== Top half ===
==== Section 1 ====
Last 128; Best of 7 frames
(Scotland) John Higgins	4
(England) Andy Hicks	0
(England) Sam Baird	4
(Malaysia) Thor Chuan Leong	2
(England) Peter Ebdon	4
(China) Zhang Anda	0
(Wales) Jamie Jones	0
(England) Michael Georgiou	4
(China) Liang Wenbo	4
(Egypt) Hatem Yassen	0
(England) Gary Wilson	4
(England) Jimmy White	1
(Wales) Michael White	4
(England) Joe O'Connor	2
(England) Tom Ford	4
(England) Jason Weston	1

Last 64; Best of 7 frames
(Scotland) John Higgins	4
(England) Sam Baird	0
(England) Peter Ebdon	2
(England) Michael Georgiou	4
(China) Liang Wenbo	4
(England) Gary Wilson	1
(Wales) Michael White	4
(England) Tom Ford	3

Last 32; Best of 7 frames
(Scotland) John Higgins	4
(England) Michael Georgiou	1
(China) Liang Wenbo	1
(Wales) Michael White	4

Last 16; Best of 7 frames
(Scotland) John Higgins	1
(Wales) Michael White	4

==== Section 2 ====
Last 128; Best of 7 frames
(England) Mike Dunn	4
(England) Chris Wakelin	3
(Wales) Ryan Day	4
(Australia) Vinnie Calabrese	0
(Finland) Robin Hull	4
(Iran) Hossein Vafaei	2
(Northern Ireland) Mark Allen	4
(England) Sam Craigie	0
(China) Xiao Guodong	1
(England) James Cahill	4
(England) Mark Davis	4
(China) Zhao Xintong	2
(England) Robbie Williams	4
(England) Luke Simmonds	3
(England) Barry Hawkins	4
(Wales) Lee Walker	2

Last 64; Best of 7 frames
(England) Mike Dunn	3
(Wales) Ryan Day	4
(Finland) Robin Hull	3
(Northern Ireland) Mark Allen	4
(England) James Cahill	1
(England) Mark Davis	4
(England) Robbie Williams	3
(England) Barry Hawkins	4

Last 32; Best of 7 frames
(Wales) Ryan Day	1
(Northern Ireland) Mark Allen	4
(England) Mark Davis	2
(England) Barry Hawkins	4

Last 16; Best of 7 frames
(Northern Ireland) Mark Allen	4
(England) Barry Hawkins	3

==== Section 3 ====
Last 128; Best of 7 frames
(England) Shaun Murphy	4
(Brazil) Itaro Santos	1
(China) Zhou Yuelong	2
(England) Mitchell Mann	4
(Belgium) Luca Brecel	4
(England) Ian Burns	3
(England) Mark King	4
(Scotland) Scott Donaldson	0
(China) Ding Junhui	4
(England) Steven Hallworth	1
(Northern Ireland) Joe Swail	4
(England) Zak Surety	1
(England) Matthew Selt	4
(England) Nigel Bond	0
(Northern Ireland) Gerard Greene	3
(England) Sydney Wilson	4

Last 64; Best of 7 frames
(England) Shaun Murphy	4
(England) Mitchell Mann	3
(Belgium) Luca Brecel	4
(England) Mark King	3
(China) Ding Junhui	4
(Northern Ireland) Joe Swail	3
(England) Matthew Selt	4
(England) Sydney Wilson	1

Last 32; Best of 7 frames
(England) Shaun Murphy	2
(Belgium) Luca Brecel	4
(China) Ding Junhui	4
(England) Matthew Selt	3

Last 16; Best of 7 frames
(Belgium) Luca Brecel	2
(China) Ding Junhui	4

==== Section 4 ====
Last 128; Best of 7 frames
(Scotland) Jamie Burnett	w/d
(Scotland) Ross Muir	w/o
(Scotland) Graeme Dott	4
(Isle of Man) Darryl Hill	1
(England) Andrew Higginson	2
(Wales) Daniel Wells	4
(Hong Kong) Marco Fu	4
(England) Joel Walker	0
(Thailand) Thepchaiya Un-Nooh	4
(England) Paul Davison	2
(Scotland) Anthony McGill	4
(England) Liam Highfield	3
(England) Stuart Carrington	4
(Northern Ireland) Jordan Brown	0
(Australia) Neil Robertson	4
(Scotland) Fraser Patrick	3

Last 64; Best of 7 frames
(Scotland) Ross Muir	3
(Scotland) Graeme Dott	4
(Wales) Daniel Wells	1
(Hong Kong) Marco Fu	4
(Thailand) Thepchaiya Un-Nooh	1
(Scotland) Anthony McGill	4
(England) Stuart Carrington	1
(Australia) Neil Robertson	4

Last 32; Best of 7 frames
(Scotland) Graeme Dott	2
(Hong Kong) Marco Fu	4
(Scotland) Anthony McGill	2
(Australia) Neil Robertson	4

Last 16; Best of 7 frames
(Hong Kong) Marco Fu	2
(Australia) Neil Robertson	4

=== Bottom half ===
==== Section 5 ====
Last 128; Best of 7 frames
(England) Mark Selby	4
(Wales) Duane Jones	0
(England) David Grace	2
(England) Peter Lines	4
(England) Ali Carter	4
(China) Cao Yupeng	1
(Republic of Ireland) Fergal O'Brien	4
(Thailand) Noppon Saengkham	3
(Wales) Mark Williams	4
(China) Lu Chenwei	3
(England) Rod Lawler	4
(England) Sanderson Lam	3
(England) Kyren Wilson	3
(Republic of Ireland) Leo Fernandez	4
(Norway) Kurt Maflin	4
(England) Hammad Miah	3

Last 64; Best of 7 frames
(England) Mark Selby	4
(England) Peter Lines	2
(England) Ali Carter	3
(Republic of Ireland) Fergal O'Brien	4
(Wales) Mark Williams	4
(England) Rod Lawler	2
(Republic of Ireland) Leo Fernandez	1
(Norway) Kurt Maflin	4

Last 32; Best of 7 frames
(England) Mark Selby	4
(Republic of Ireland) Fergal O'Brien	2
(Wales) Mark Williams	4
(Norway) Kurt Maflin	2

Last 16; Best of 7 frames
(England) Mark Selby	4
(Wales) Mark Williams	2

==== Section 6 ====
Last 128; Best of 7 frames
(Thailand) Dechawat Poomjaeng	4
(England) Craig Steadman	1
(England) Robert Milkins	4
(England) Sean O'Sullivan	3
(China) Yu Delu	4
(England) Ian Glover	3
(England) Ricky Walden	4
(Thailand) James Wattana	3
(England) Jimmy Robertson	4
(England) Michael Wild	3
(England) Michael Holt	4
(Pakistan) Hamza Akbar	3
(China) Tian Pengfei	4
(England) Ashley Hugill	2
(England) Ronnie O'Sullivan	4
(England) Barry Pinches	1

Last 64; Best of 7 frames
(Thailand) Dechawat Poomjaeng	4
(England) Robert Milkins	1
(China) Yu Delu	4
(England) Ricky Walden	3
(England) Jimmy Robertson	4
(England) Michael Holt	1
(China) Tian Pengfei	0
(England) Ronnie O'Sullivan	4

Last 32; Best of 7 frames
(Thailand) Dechawat Poomjaeng	3
(China) Yu Delu	4
(England) Jimmy Robertson	0
(England) Ronnie O'Sullivan	4

Last 16; Best of 7 frames
(China) Yu Delu	1
(England) Ronnie O'Sullivan	4

==== Section 7 ====
Last 128; Best of 7 frames
(England) Judd Trump	4
(Scotland) Michael Leslie	0
(England) Rory McLeod	4
(England) Michael Wasley	3
(Scotland) Alan McManus	4
(Scotland) Rhys Clark	3
(England) Mark Joyce	4
(Wales) Gareth Allen	0
(England) Joe Perry	4
(Malta) Tony Drago	0
(China) Li Hang	4
(England) Chris Melling	0
(England) David Gilbert	4
(China) Zhang Yong	0
(Republic of Ireland) Ken Doherty	4
(China) Lu Ning	0

Last 64; Best of 7 frames
(England) Judd Trump	4
(England) Rory McLeod	1
(Scotland) Alan McManus	4
(England) Mark Joyce	1
(England) Joe Perry	4
(China) Li Hang	2
(England) David Gilbert	3
(Republic of Ireland) Ken Doherty	4

Last 32; Best of 7 frames
(England) Judd Trump	4
(Scotland) Alan McManus	2
(England) Joe Perry	4
(Republic of Ireland) Ken Doherty	2

Last 16; Best of 7 frames
(England) Judd Trump	3
(England) Joe Perry	4

==== Section 8 ====
Last 128; Best of 7 frames
(Wales) Matthew Stevens	4
(Republic of Ireland) David Morris	2
(Scotland) Stephen Maguire	3
(England) Martin O'Donnell	4
(England) Jack Lisowski	4
(Scotland) Eden Sharav	2
(England) Martin Gould	4
(England) Adam Duffy	1
(Wales) Dominic Dale	3
(England) Alfie Burden	4
(England) Ben Woollaston	4
(England) Jamie Cope	0
(England) Oliver Lines	1
(England) Allan Taylor	4
(England) Stuart Bingham	1
(England) Anthony Hamilton	4

Last 64; Best of 7 frames
(Wales) Matthew Stevens	4
(England) Martin O'Donnell	2
(England) Jack Lisowski	3
(England) Martin Gould	4
(England) Alfie Burden	1
(England) Ben Woollaston	4
(England) Allan Taylor	2
(England) Anthony Hamilton	4

Last 32; Best of 7 frames
(Wales) Matthew Stevens	3
(England) Martin Gould	4
(England) Ben Woollaston	4
(England) Anthony Hamilton	3

Last 16; Best of 7 frames
(England) Martin Gould	1
(England) Ben Woollaston	4

=== Finals ===
Quarter-finals; Best of 9 frames
(Wales) Michael White	0
(Northern Ireland) Mark Allen	5
(China) Ding Junhui	2
(Australia) Neil Robertson	5
(England) Mark Selby	1
(England) Ronnie O'Sullivan	5
(England) Joe Perry	5
(England) Ben Woollaston	1

Semi-finals; Best of 11 frames
(Northern Ireland) Mark Allen	4
(Australia) Neil Robertson	6
(England) Ronnie O'Sullivan	6
(England) Joe Perry	3

Final; Best of 17 frames
(Australia) Neil Robertson	5
(England) Ronnie O'Sullivan	9

== Final ==
Final: Best of 17 frames. Referee: Terry Camilleri; Motorpoint Arena, Cardiff, Wales, 21 February 2016.
Neil Robertson; Australia	5–9	Ronnie O'Sullivan; England
Afternoon: 64–5, 78–0 (78), 33–88 (60), 76–1 (76), 12–71 (60), 66–0, 77–1 (77), 20–85; Evening: 39–94 (57), 42–78, 26–74 (67), 21–71 (70), 1–79 (61), 0–141 (141)
78	Highest break	141
0	Century breaks	1
3	50+ breaks	7

== Century breaks ==
- 147, 126, 120 – Ding Junhui
- 146, 141, 132, 132, 131, 124, 112, 110, 102, 101 – Ronnie O'Sullivan
- 141, 140, 126, 107 – Neil Robertson
- 139, 130 – Joe Perry
- 139 – Peter Ebdon
- 137, 115, 105, 104, 100 – John Higgins
- 135, 125, 124, 105 – Mark Allen
- 135, 108 – Shaun Murphy
- 134 – Mark Davis
- 133 – Allan Taylor
- 133 – Eden Sharav
- 131 – Matthew Stevens
- 130 – Martin O'Donnell
- 128, 115 – Mark Selby
- 127 – Rod Lawler
- 126, 112 – Anthony Hamilton
- 124, 112 – Judd Trump
- 118, 101 – Michael White
- 116, 101 – Marco Fu
- 115 – Jack Lisowski
- 115 – Tom Ford
- 114, 105 – Robin Hull
- 113 – Lee Walker
- 113 – Robbie Williams
- 112 – Itaro Santos
- 111 – Kurt Maflin
- 110, 109 – Alan McManus
- 107 – Anthony McGill
- 107 – Martin Gould
- 107 – Michael Holt
- 106, 103 – Liang Wenbo
- 105 – Dechawat Poomjaeng
- 105 – Michael Wasley
- 104 – David Grace
- 104 – Gary Wilson
- 103 – David Gilbert
- 103 – Mike Dunn
- 102 – Ashley Hugill
