= Jamie Curtis-Barrett =

English snooker player

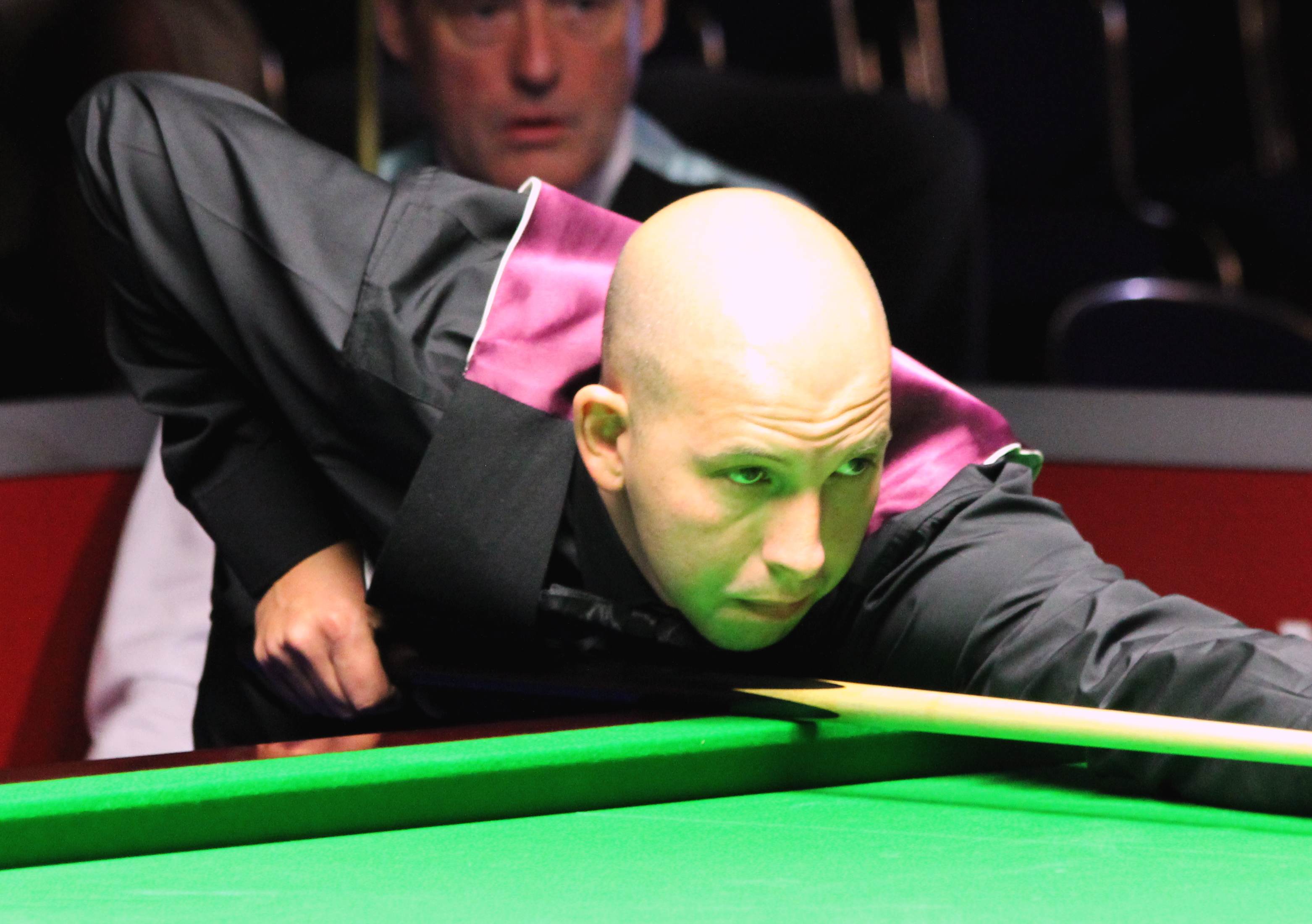
- Paul Hunter Classic 2016

Personal information
- Born: 19 April 1984 (age 42) Grimsby, Lincolnshire, England

Sport
- Country: England
- Sport: Snooker
- Professional: 2016–2018
- Highest ranking: 92 (June 2017)

Jamie Curtis-Barrett (born 19 April 1984 in Grimsby, Lincolnshire) is an English snooker player.

== Career ==
After playing snooker from the age of 11, Curtis-Barrett drifted away from the game after the death of his grandfather who had been a huge influence on his game. He began playing regularly again in the 2000s and earning a sponsor in 2009.

As an amateur, he entered qualifying for both the 2015 Australian Goldfields Open and 2016 German Masters, losing in the first qualifying round of both tournaments.

Curtis-Barrett turned professional after finishing second on the 2016 Q School Order of Merit. He won three matches in his opening season; defeating James Cahill 5–3 in Shanghai Masters qualifying before being eliminated by Jamie Jones; Matthew Selt 4–2 at the Northern Ireland Open before losing in the second round to David Gilbert; and a single frame encounter with Sam Baird in the Snooker Shoot-Out, where he was knocked out in the second round by eventual winner Anthony McGill. His season ended on a low note when he was whitewashed 10-0 by Jamie Jones in the first round of qualifying for the World Championship.

Entry to the shoot out in 2018 was followed by a first round defeat to Zhang Yong. He entered the 2018 Q School in a bid to win back his place on the world snooker tour, he won in the first round against Belgium's Hans Blanckaert.

== Performance and rankings timeline ==
Tournament	2015/ 16	2016/ 17	2017/ 18	2018/ 19	2020/ 21
Ranking (Note: It shows the ranking at the beginning of the season.)	(Note: He was an amateur.)	(Note: New players on the Main Tour don't have a ranking.)	92		
Ranking tournaments
European Masters	NH	A	LQ	A	A
English Open	NH	1R	1R	A	A
Championship League	Non-Ranking Event				RR
Northern Ireland Open	NH	2R	2R	A	A
UK Championship	A	1R	1R	A	1R
Scottish Open	NH	1R	2R	A	A
World Grand Prix	DNQ	DNQ	DNQ	DNQ	DNQ
German Masters	LQ	LQ	LQ	A	LQ
Shoot-Out	A	2R	1R	A	1R
Welsh Open	A	1R	1R	A	1R
Players Championship	DNQ	DNQ	DNQ	DNQ	DNQ
Gibraltar Open	MR	1R	2R	1R	1R
WST Pro Series	Tournament Not Held				RR
Tour Championship	Tournament Not Held			DNQ	DNQ
World Championship	A	LQ	LQ	A	A
Former ranking tournaments
Australian Goldfields Open	LQ	Tournament Not Held			
Shanghai Masters	LQ	LQ	LQ	NR	NH
Riga Masters	MR	LQ	1R	A	NH
World Open	NH	A	LQ	A	NH
China Championship	NH	NR	LQ	A	NH
International Championship	A	A	LQ	A	NH
Indian Open	NH	A	LQ	A	NH
China Open	A	LQ	LQ	A	NH
Paul Hunter Classic	MR	1R	2R	LQ	NH

Performance Table Legend
LQ	lost in the qualifying draw	#R	lost in the early rounds of the tournament (WR = Wildcard round, RR = Round robin)	QF	lost in the quarter-finals
SF	lost in the semi-finals	F	lost in the final	W	won the tournament
DNQ	did not qualify for the tournament	A	did not participate in the tournament	WD	withdrew from the tournament

NH / Not Held	means an event was not held.
NR / Non-Ranking Event	means an event is/was no longer a ranking event.
R / Ranking Event	means an event is/was a ranking event.
MR / Minor-Ranking Event	means an event is/was a minor-ranking event.

== Career finals ==
=== Amateur finals: 1 (1 title) ===
Outcome	No.	Year	Championship	Opponent in the final	Score
Winner	1.	2022	English Amateur Championship	(England) John Welsh	10–5

=== Seniors finals: 1 ===
Outcome	No.	Year	Championship	Opponent in the final	Score
Runner-up	1.	2025	Seniors Tour – Event 3	(Northern Ireland) Gerard Greene	2–4
