= Rhys Clark (snooker player) =

Scottish snooker player

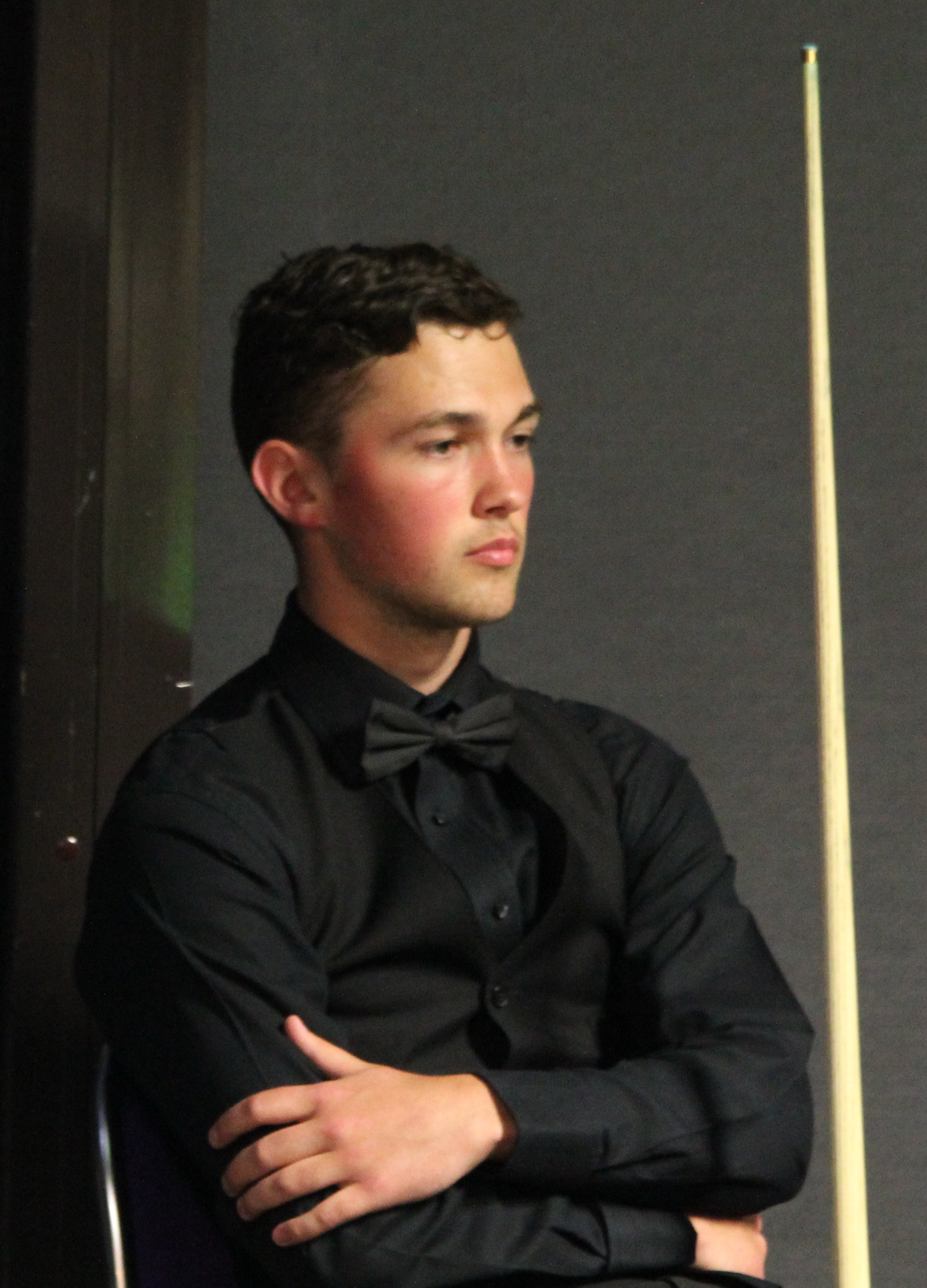
- Paul Hunter Classic 2016

Personal information
- Born: 17 August 1994 (age 32) Stonehouse, South Lanarkshire

Sport
- Country: Scotland
- Sport: Snooker
- Professional: 2015–2019
- Highest ranking: 73 (October 2016)
- Best ranking finish: Last 16 (x2)

Rhys Clark (born 17 August 1994) is a former Scottish professional snooker player.

== Career ==
=== Amateur ===
From the village of Stonehouse, South Lanarkshire in Scotland, Clark started playing snooker from aged 11. As an amateur he featured in various professional tournaments with his best results coming in the 2014 World Snooker Championship first round qualifier where he beat Mike Dunn 10–2 and the 2015 Indian Open wildcard round where he beat former professional Pankaj Advani 4–3.

=== Professional ===
In the first event of the 2015 Q School, Clark reached the final round and made breaks of 63 and 59 against Leo Fernandez and won 4–1, a win which gave Clark a two-year card to the World Snooker Tour for the 2015–16 season and 2016–17 seasons. He won his first match by beating Grant Miles 5–1 in the 2015 Australian Goldfields Open qualifiers, before losing by a reverse of this scoreline to Li Hang. At the UK Championship he was knocked out in the first round 1–6 by Mark Davis. A 5–0 whitewash over Ken Doherty with a high break of 104 saw Clark qualify for the China Open. In Clark's first appearance at a Chinese ranking event he won a match at a venue for the first time by beating Davis 5–4. In the next round Clark made breaks over 50 in each of the four frames he won, but was edged out 4–5 by Alfie Burden. His first season as a professional ended with an opening round 5–10 defeat to David Gilbert in World Championship qualifying.

Clark received a bye to the second round of the 2016 English Open and then eliminated Lee Walker 4–2 and Kyren Wilson 4–3 (finished the match with 50 plus breaks in five successive frames) to advance to the last 16 of a ranking event for the first time and he lost 1–4 to Stuart Bingham. Clark earned a second round televised match with Ronnie O'Sullivan at the UK Championship after squeezing past Li Hang 6–5, but was whitewashed 0–6. He knocked out Sean O'Sullivan 4–1 and Mitchell Mann at the Gibraltar Open, before losing 2–4 to Neil Robertson Clark ended the season 75th in the world rankings, but has earned a new two-year tour card through the one-year ranking list.

== Performance and rankings timeline ==
Tournament	2012/ 13	2013/ 14	2014/ 15	2015/ 16	2016/ 17	2017/ 18	2018/ 19
Ranking (Note: It shows the ranking at the beginning of the season.)	(Note: He was an amateur.)			(Note: New players on the Main Tour don't have a ranking.)	95	(Note: Players qualified One Year Ranking List started the season without ranking points.)	95
Ranking tournaments
Riga Masters (Note: The event was called the Riga Open (2014/2015–2015/2016))	Not Held		MR		LQ	LQ	WD
World Open	A	LQ	Not Held		LQ	LQ	LQ
Paul Hunter Classic	Minor-Ranking Event				2R	1R	A
China Championship	Tournament Not Held				NR	LQ	1R
European Masters	Tournament Not Held				2R	LQ	A
English Open	Tournament Not Held				4R	2R	A
International Championship	LQ	A	A	LQ	LQ	LQ	LQ
Northern Ireland Open	Tournament Not Held				1R	1R	A
UK Championship	A	1R	A	1R	2R	WD	A
Scottish Open	MR	Not Held			2R	1R	1R
German Masters	A	A	A	LQ	LQ	LQ	A
World Grand Prix	Not Held		NR	DNQ	DNQ	DNQ	DNQ
Welsh Open	A	1R	A	1R	1R	1R	1R
Shoot-Out	Non-Ranking Event				2R	A	A
Indian Open	NH	LQ	1R	NH	LQ	LQ	A
Players Championship (Note: The event was called the Players Tour Championship Grand Finals (2011/2012–2012/2013))	DNQ	DNQ	DNQ	DNQ	DNQ	DNQ	DNQ
Gibraltar Open	Not Held			MR	3R	A	A
Tour Championship	Tournament Not Held						DNQ
China Open	A	A	LQ	2R	1R	LQ	WD
World Championship	A	LQ	LQ	LQ	LQ	LQ	LQ
Former ranking tournaments
Australian Goldfields Open	A	A	A	LQ	Not Held		
Shanghai Masters	A	LQ	A	LQ	LQ	LQ	NR

Performance Table Legend
LQ	lost in the qualifying draw	#R	lost in the early rounds of the tournament (WR = Wildcard round, RR = Round robin)	QF	lost in the quarter-finals
SF	lost in the semi-finals	F	lost in the final	W	won the tournament
DNQ	did not qualify for the tournament	A	did not participate in the tournament	WD	withdrew from the tournament

NH / Not Held	means an event was not held.
NR / Non-Ranking Event	means an event is/was no longer a ranking event.
R / Ranking Event	means an event is/was a ranking event.
MR / Minor-Ranking Event	means an event is/was a minor-ranking event.
