= 2016 Northern Ireland Open =

2016 Coral Northern Ireland Open

Tournament information
- Dates: 14–20 November 2016
- Venue: Titanic Exhibition Centre
- City: Belfast
- Country: Northern Ireland
- Organisation: World Snooker
- Format: Ranking event
- Total prize fund: £366,000
- Winner's share: £70,000
- Highest break: John Higgins (SCO) (147)

Final
- Champion: Mark King (ENG)
- Runner-up: Barry Hawkins (ENG)
- Score: 9–8

The 2016 Northern Ireland Open (officially the 2016 Coral Northern Ireland Open) was a professional ranking snooker tournament that took place between 14 and 20 November 2016 at the Titanic Exhibition Centre in Belfast, Northern Ireland. It was the ninth ranking event of the 2016/2017 season.

This was the inaugural Northern Ireland Open event, being held as part of a new Home Nations Series introduced in the 2016/2017 season with the existing Welsh Open and new English Open and Scottish Open tournaments. The winner of the Northern Ireland Open is awarded the Alex Higgins Trophy which is named in honour of Northern Irish two-time world champion Alex Higgins.

Mark King won the first ranking title of his career by defeating Barry Hawkins 9–8 in the final.

John Higgins made the 123rd official maximum break in the fifth frame of his last 64 match against Sam Craigie. It was Higgins' eighth professional maximum.

== Prize fund ==
The breakdown of prize money for this year is shown below:

- Winner: £70,000
- Runner-up: £30,000
- Semi-final: £20,000
- Quarter-final: £10,000
- Last 16: £6,000
- Last 32: £3,500
- Last 64: £2,500
- Highest break: £2,000
- Total: £366,000

The "rolling 147 prize" for a maximum break stood at £10,000.

== Main draw ==
=== Top half ===
==== Section 1 ====
Last 128; Best of 7 frames
(England) Judd Trump (1) | w/d
(England) Peter Ebdon | w/o
(England) Michael Wild | 2
(England) Adam Duffy | 4
(Australia) Kurt Dunham | 4
(England) Christopher Keogan | 2
(England) Robert Milkins | 1
(Scotland) Scott Donaldson | 4
(Scotland) Stephen Maguire (16) | 3
(Scotland) Alan McManus | 4
(China) Wang Yuchen | 1
(England) Sanderson Lam | 4
(England) Zak Surety | 4
(Isle of Man) Darryl Hill | 3
(Iran) Hossein Vafaei | 4
(England) Rod Lawler | 3

Last 64; Best of 7 frames
(England) Peter Ebdon | 4
(England) Adam Duffy | 3
(Australia) Kurt Dunham | 3
(Scotland) Scott Donaldson | 4
(Scotland) Alan McManus | 0
(England) Sanderson Lam | 4
(England) Zak Surety | 2
(Iran) Hossein Vafaei | 4

Last 32; Best of 7 frames
(England) Peter Ebdon | 2
(Scotland) Scott Donaldson | 4
(England) Sanderson Lam | 1
(Iran) Hossein Vafaei | 4

Last 16; Best of 7 frames
(Scotland) Scott Donaldson | 2
(Iran) Hossein Vafaei | 4

==== Section 2 ====
Last 128; Best of 7 frames
(China) Zhang Yong | 2
(Norway) Kurt Maflin | 4
(Malta) Alex Borg | 4
(Thailand) Dechawat Poomjaeng | 2
(England) Mike Dunn | 3
(Republic of Ireland) Josh Boileau | 4
(England) Ali Carter (9) | w/d
(Pakistan) Hamza Akbar | w/o
(Republic of Ireland) Fergal O'Brien | 4
(China) Tian Pengfei | 2
(Malaysia) Thor Chuan Leong | 1
(England) Mitchell Mann | 4
(England) Mark King | 4
(Brazil) Igor Figueiredo | 1
(China) Liang Wenbo (8) | 4
(England) Nigel Bond | 1

Last 64; Best of 7 frames
(Norway) Kurt Maflin | 4
(Malta) Alex Borg | 1
(Republic of Ireland) Josh Boileau | 4
(Pakistan) Hamza Akbar | 2
(Republic of Ireland) Fergal O'Brien | 4
(England) Mitchell Mann | 0
(England) Mark King | 4
(China) Liang Wenbo (8) | 2

Last 32; Best of 7 frames
(Norway) Kurt Maflin | 4
(Republic of Ireland) Josh Boileau | 1
(Republic of Ireland) Fergal O'Brien | 0
(England) Mark King | 4

Last 16; Best of 7 frames
(Norway) Kurt Maflin | 2
(England) Mark King | 4

==== Section 3 ====
Last 128; Best of 7 frames
(England) Ronnie O'Sullivan (5) | 4
(Wales) David John | 1
(Wales) Gareth Allen | 2
(England) Jimmy White | 4
(China) Zhang Anda | 4
(Wales) Ian Preece | 0
(England) Chris Wakelin | 4
(Thailand) James Wattana | 1
(England) Kyren Wilson (12) | 4
(England) Hammad Miah | 2
(Northern Ireland) Jordan Brown | 4
(England) Ben Woollaston | 2
(China) Cao Yupeng | 1
(Thailand) Sunny Akani | 4
(England) Mark Davis | 4
(England) Jason Weston | 0

Last 64; Best of 7 frames
(England) Ronnie O'Sullivan (5) | 4
(England) Jimmy White | 1
(China) Zhang Anda | 4
(England) Chris Wakelin | 3
(England) Kyren Wilson (12) | 4
(Northern Ireland) Jordan Brown | 2
(Thailand) Sunny Akani | 4
(England) Mark Davis | 3

Last 32; Best of 7 frames
(England) Ronnie O'Sullivan (5) | 4
(China) Zhang Anda | 0
(England) Kyren Wilson (12) | 4
(Thailand) Sunny Akani | 2

Last 16; Best of 7 frames
(England) Ronnie O'Sullivan (5) | 3
(England) Kyren Wilson (12) | 4

==== Section 4 ====
Last 128; Best of 7 frames
(England) Matthew Selt | 2
(England) Jamie Curtis-Barrett | 4
(China) Zhao Xintong | 1
(England) David Gilbert | 4
(England) Craig Steadman | 4
(England) Alfie Burden | 1
(Wales) Mark Williams (13) | 4
(England) David Grace | 2
(China) Zhou Yuelong | 4
(Wales) Matthew Stevens | 3
(England) Allan Taylor | 4
(China) Li Hang | 2
(England) Sam Craigie | 4
(Wales) Jamie Jones | 0
(Scotland) John Higgins (4) | 4
(England) Paul Davison | 0

Last 64; Best of 7 frames
(England) Jamie Curtis-Barrett | 1
(England) David Gilbert | 4
(England) Craig Steadman | 0
(Wales) Mark Williams (13) | 4
(China) Zhou Yuelong | 4
(England) Allan Taylor | 0
(England) Sam Craigie | 1
(Scotland) John Higgins (4) | 4

Last 32; Best of 7 frames
(England) David Gilbert | 2
(Wales) Mark Williams (13) | 4
(China) Zhou Yuelong | 0
(Scotland) John Higgins (4) | 4

Last 16; Best of 7 frames
(Wales) Mark Williams (13) | 4
(Scotland) John Higgins (4) | 1

=== Bottom half ===
==== Section 5 ====
Last 128; Best of 7 frames
(England) Shaun Murphy (3) | 0
(Belgium) Luca Brecel | 4
(Poland) Adam Stefanow | 2
(England) Jamie Cope | 4
(Scotland) Graeme Dott | 0
(Wales) Michael White | 4
(China) Chen Zhe | 4
(Scotland) Ross Muir | 1
(England) Ricky Walden (14) | 4
(England) Sean O'Sullivan | 2
(Thailand) Kritsanut Lertsattayathorn | 4
(England) Rory McLeod | 2
(England) Tom Ford | 4
(England) Ian Burns | 2
(Wales) Dominic Dale | 4
(Northern Ireland) Joe Swail | 2

Last 64; Best of 7 frames
(Belgium) Luca Brecel | 4
(England) Jamie Cope | 2
(Wales) Michael White | 4
(China) Chen Zhe | 3
(England) Ricky Walden (14) | 4
(Thailand) Kritsanut Lertsattayathorn | 3
(England) Tom Ford | 0
(Wales) Dominic Dale | 4

Last 32; Best of 7 frames
(Belgium) Luca Brecel | 1
(Wales) Michael White | 4
(England) Ricky Walden (14) | 2
(Wales) Dominic Dale | 4

Last 16; Best of 7 frames
(Wales) Michael White | 4
(Wales) Dominic Dale | 2

==== Section 6 ====
Last 128; Best of 7 frames
(China) Mei Xiwen | 1
(Wales) Duane Jones | 4
(Scotland) Fraser Patrick | 4
(Scotland) Marc Davis | 1
(England) Stuart Carrington | 3
(England) Michael Holt | 4
(England) Barry Hawkins (11) | 4
(England) Martin O'Donnell | 0
(England) Jack Lisowski | 4
(England) David Lilley | 3
(England) John Astley | 4
(China) Xiao Guodong | 3
(England) Elliot Slessor | 2
(England) Jimmy Robertson | 4
(England) Joe Perry (6) | 4
(Brazil) Itaro Santos | 0

Last 64; Best of 7 frames
(Wales) Duane Jones | 0
(Scotland) Fraser Patrick | 4
(England) Michael Holt | 1
(England) Barry Hawkins (11) | 4
(England) Jack Lisowski | 4
(England) John Astley | 1
(England) Jimmy Robertson | 3
(England) Joe Perry (6) | 4

Last 32; Best of 7 frames
(Scotland) Fraser Patrick | 0
(England) Barry Hawkins (11) | 4
(England) Jack Lisowski | 4
(England) Joe Perry (6) | 3

Last 16; Best of 7 frames
(England) Barry Hawkins (11) | 4
(England) Jack Lisowski | 0

==== Section 7 ====
Last 128; Best of 7 frames
(Northern Ireland) Mark Allen (7) | 4
(England) Mark Joyce | 1
(Cyprus) Michael Georgiou | 4
(Northern Ireland) Patrick Wallace | 2
(Finland) Robin Hull | 4
(England) James Cahill | 2
(Wales) Lee Walker | 4
(Scotland) Rhys Clark | 2
(Hong Kong) Marco Fu (10) | 4
(Wales) Ryan Day | 3
(Thailand) Noppon Saengkham | 3
(England) Sam Baird | 4
(England) Andrew Higginson | 4
(Wales) Daniel Wells | 1
(England) Gary Wilson | 4
(England) Peter Lines | 0

Last 64; Best of 7 frames
(Northern Ireland) Mark Allen (7) | 4
(Cyprus) Michael Georgiou | 2
(Finland) Robin Hull | 4
(Wales) Lee Walker | 2
(Hong Kong) Marco Fu (10) | 3
(England) Sam Baird | 4
(England) Andrew Higginson | 3
(England) Gary Wilson | 4

Last 32; Best of 7 frames
(Northern Ireland) Mark Allen (7) | 4
(Finland) Robin Hull | 1
(England) Sam Baird | 3
(England) Gary Wilson | 4

Last 16; Best of 7 frames
(Northern Ireland) Mark Allen (7) | 4
(England) Gary Wilson | 3

==== Section 8 ====
Last 128; Best of 7 frames
(England) Ashley Hugill | 0
(Republic of Ireland) Ken Doherty | 4
(England) Anthony Hamilton | 4
(Thailand) Boonyarit Keattikun | 2
(India) Aditya Mehta | 4
(England) Sydney Wilson | 2
(Scotland) Anthony McGill (15) | 4
(China) Fang Xiongman | 2
(Scotland) Eden Sharav | 4
(England) Oliver Lines | 1
(England) Steven Hallworth | 1
(China) Yan Bingtao | 4
(England) Robbie Williams | 4
(Thailand) Thepchaiya Un-Nooh | 2
(China) Ding Junhui (2) | 2
(China) Yu Delu | 4

Last 64; Best of 7 frames
(Republic of Ireland) Ken Doherty | 3
(England) Anthony Hamilton | 4
(India) Aditya Mehta | 3
(Scotland) Anthony McGill (15) | 4
(Scotland) Eden Sharav | 0
(China) Yan Bingtao | 4
(England) Robbie Williams | 4
(China) Yu Delu | 1

Last 32; Best of 7 frames
(England) Anthony Hamilton | 4
(Scotland) Anthony McGill (15) | 2
(China) Yan Bingtao | 4
(England) Robbie Williams | 3

Last 16; Best of 7 frames
(England) Anthony Hamilton | 4
(China) Yan Bingtao | 3

=== Finals ===
Quarter-finals; Best of 9 frames
(Iran) Hossein Vafaei | 3
(England) Mark King | 5
(England) Kyren Wilson (12) | 5
(Wales) Mark Williams (13) | 4
(Wales) Michael White | 2
(England) Barry Hawkins (11) | 5
(Northern Ireland) Mark Allen (7) | 2
(England) Anthony Hamilton | 5

Semi-finals; Best of 11 frames
(England) Mark King | 6
(England) Kyren Wilson (12) | 2
(England) Barry Hawkins (11) | 6
(England) Anthony Hamilton | 5

Final; Best of 17 frames
(England) Mark King | 9
(England) Barry Hawkins (11) | 8

== Final ==
Final: Best of 17 frames. Referee: Terry Camilleri. Titanic Exhibition Centre, Belfast, Northern Ireland, 20 November 2016.
| Mark King; England | 9–8 | Barry Hawkins (11); England |
Afternoon: 1–85 (85), 6–118 (113), 126–11 (110), 49–80, 1–60, 14–64, 66–18, 90–1; Evening: 95–5 (62), 101–13 (100), 83–1, 76–6 (54), 0–73 (73), 40–82 (76), 65–28, 65–72, 84–33
| 110 | Highest break | 113 |
| 2 | Century breaks | 1 |
| 4 | 50+ breaks | 4 |

== Century breaks ==
- 147, 137, 130, 107 – John Higgins
- 142 – Fergal O'Brien
- 141, 133, 131, 126, 117, 108 – Ronnie O'Sullivan
- 139 – Mark Williams
- 138, 134, 124 – Anthony Hamilton
- 137, 130, 117, 104 – Michael White
- 133 – Dominic Dale
- 131 – Chen Zhe
- 130, 121 – Yan Bingtao
- 126, 117, 113 – Barry Hawkins
- 126 – Kurt Dunham
- 125, 108 – Rhys Clark
- 125 – Alfie Burden
- 125 – James Cahill
- 121 – David Gilbert
- 120 – Peter Ebdon
- 119, 112, 101 – Kurt Maflin
- 119 – Hossein Vafaei
- 118 – Marco Fu
- 118 – Alan McManus
- 117 – Luca Brecel
- 116, 109 – Ricky Walden
- 113, 109, 100 – Kyren Wilson
- 112 – Michael Georgiou
- 110, 100 – Mark King
- 110 – Anthony McGill
- 110 – Tom Ford
- 109 – Mark Allen
- 106 – Scott Donaldson
- 106 – Sam Baird
- 104 – Sam Craigie
- 104 – Yu Delu
- 103 – Jamie Curtis-Barrett
- 102 – Jordan Brown
- 102 – Ken Doherty
- 102 – Liang Wenbo
- 101 – Robbie Williams
- 102 – Stephen Maguire
- 100 – Jack Lisowski
- 100 – Eden Sharav
