= Jason Weston =

English snooker player

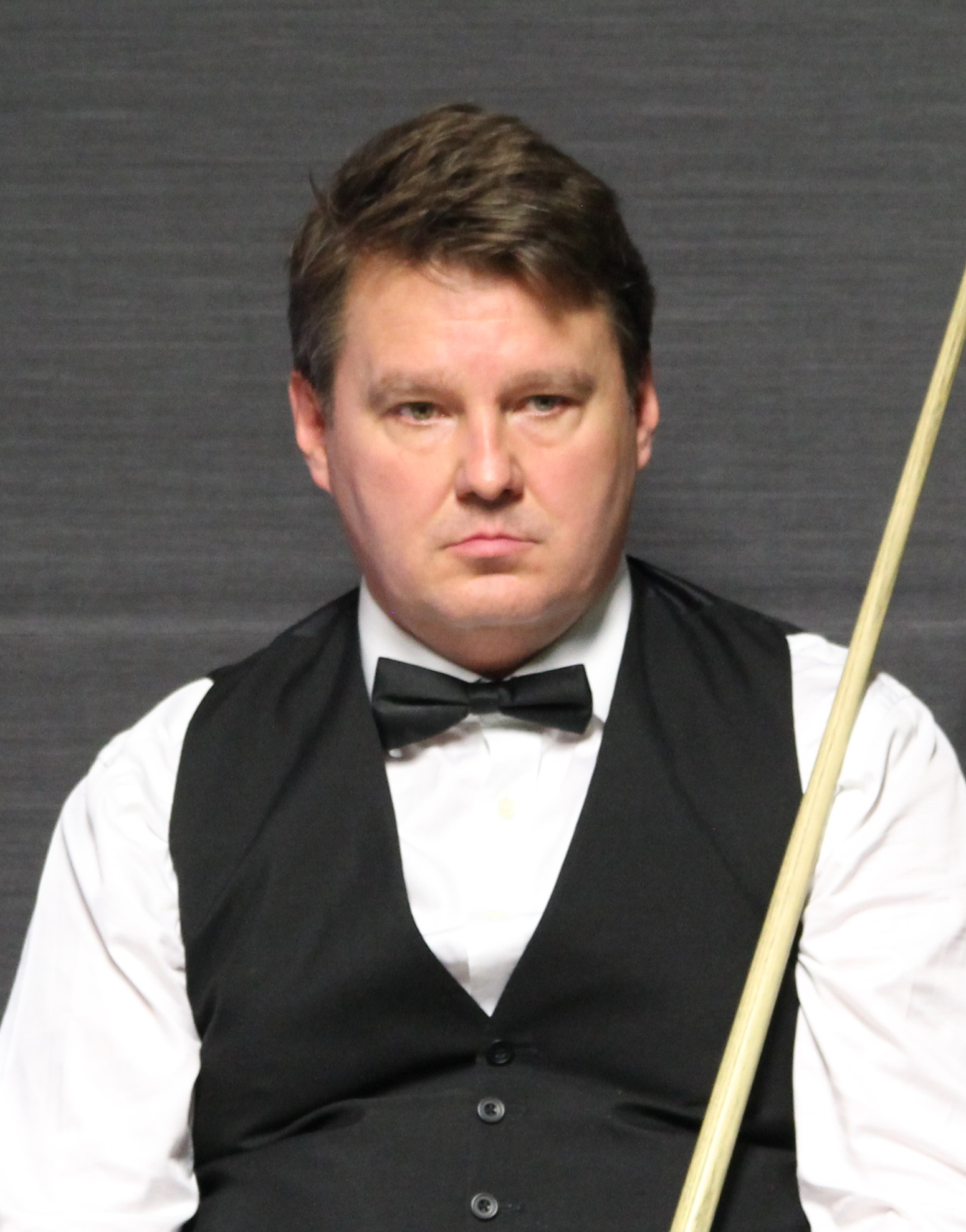
- Paul Hunter Classic 2016

Personal information
- Born: 11 January 1971 (age 55) Portsmouth, England

Sport
- Country: England
- Sport: Snooker
- Professional: 1991–1997, 1998–2001, 2002/2003, 2015–2017
- Highest ranking: 90 (June 2016)
- Best ranking finish: Last 32 (x2)

Jason Weston (born 11 January 1971 in Portsmouth) is an English former professional snooker player. He competed on the main tour between 1991 and 1997 and intermittently until 2003, at one point being ranked the world number 90.

After entering the 2015 Q School, Weston regained his professional status for the 2015–16 season after a twelve-year absence.

== Career ==
Weston, first turned professional at the start of the 1991–92 season, in a season which he reached the semi-final of the Benson & Hedges Satellite Championship, losing to future World Champion Ken Doherty, an event which the winner gain entry as a wildcard to the Masters. Weston qualified for the 1992 British Open in Derby, losing to Eddie Charlton in the last 32. However he then struggled to match these season and had an on-off career on the main tour, before ending to his career in 2003 after suffering from chronic fatigue syndrome.

During the 2014–15 season Weston returned to competition snooker at the pro-am 2015 Gdynia Open.

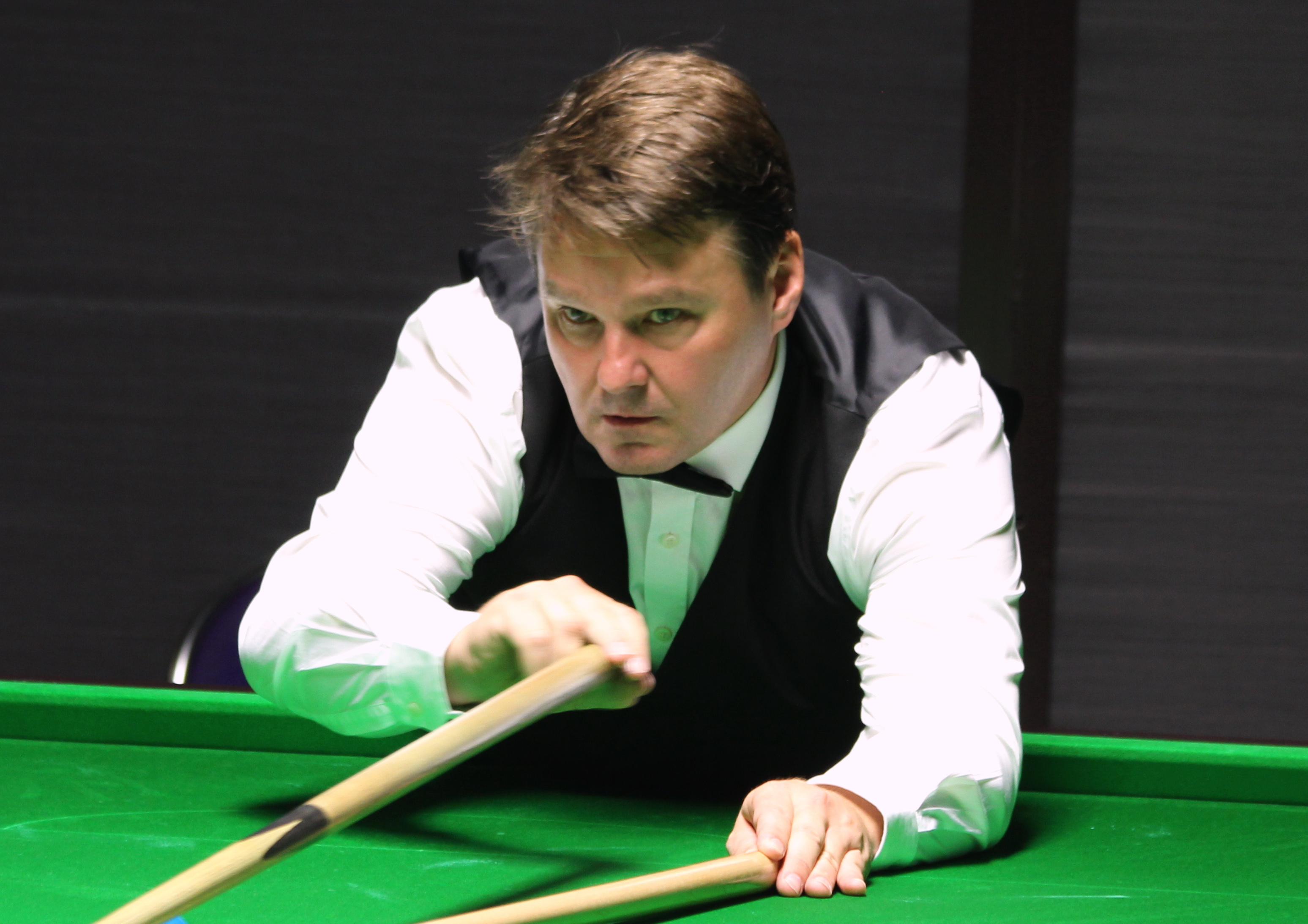
2016 Paul Hunter Classic

Weston entered the 2015 Q School at which eight two-year professional tour cards were on offer. Weston was successful in the second event with wins over Corey Deuel, Owais Ali, Simon Dent, Matthew Day, Joe Roberts and Kuldesh Johal 4–2 in the quarter final ensured his place of the World Snooker Tour for the 2015–16 and 2016–17 seasons. Weston only won 4 matches (including one walkover) during the 2015/16 season, all at the minor-ranking European Tour events. The following season was even worse, as his only win came at the single-frame Shoot-Out event. As a result, Weston was relegated from the tour.

== Performance and rankings timeline ==
Tournament	1991/ 92	1992/ 93	1993/ 94	1994/ 95	1995/ 96	1996/ 97	1997/ 98	1998/ 99	1999/ 00	2000/ 01	2001/ 02	2002/ 03	2014/ 15	2015/ 16	2016/ 17
Ranking (Note: From the 2010/2011 season it shows the ranking at the beginning of the season.)	(Note: New players on the Main Tour don't have a ranking.)	98	118	102	111	123	(Note: He was an amateur.)		123	131					115
Ranking tournaments
Riga Masters (Note: The event was called the Riga Open (2014/2015–2015/2016))	Tournament Not Held												Minor-Rank.		LQ
Indian Open	Tournament Not Held												A	NH	LQ
World Open (Note: The event was called the Grand Prix (2008/2009–2009/2010) and the Haikou World Open (2011/2012–2013/2014))	LQ	LQ	LQ	LQ	LQ	LQ	LQ	LQ	A	LQ	A	LQ	NR	DNQ	LQ
Paul Hunter Classic	Tournament Not Held												Minor-Rank.		1R
Shanghai Masters	Tournament Not Held												A	LQ	LQ
European Masters (Note: The event was called the Malta Cup (2004/2005–2007/2008))	LQ	2R	LQ	LQ	LQ	LQ	NH	LQ	Not Held		A	LQ	Not Held		LQ
English Open	Tournament Not Held														1R
International Championship	Tournament Not Held												A	LQ	LQ
Northern Ireland Open	Tournament Not Held														1R
UK Championship	LQ	LQ	LQ	LQ	LQ	1R	LQ	LQ	A	LQ	A	LQ	A	1R	1R
Scottish Open (Note: The event run under different names as International Open (1992/1993–1996/1997))	NH	LQ	LQ	LQ	LQ	1R	A	LQ	A	LQ	A	LQ	Not Held		1R
German Masters (Note: The event run under different name as German Open (1995/1996–1997/1998))	Not Held				LQ	LQ	LQ	NR	Tournament Not Held				A	LQ	LQ
World Grand Prix	Tournament Not Held												NR	A	DNQ
Welsh Open	LQ	1R	LQ	1R	LQ	LQ	LQ	LQ	A	LQ	A	LQ	A	1R	1R
Shoot-Out	Tournament Not Held											Non-ranking Event			2R
Gibraltar Open	Tournament Not Held													MR	1R
Players Championship (Note: The event was called the Players Tour Championship Grand Finals (2010/2011–2012/2013) and the Players Championship Grand Final (2013/2014–2015/2016))	Tournament Not Held												DNQ	DNQ	DNQ
China Open (Note: The event run under different name as China International (1997/1998–1998/1999))	Tournament Not Held						NR	LQ	A	LQ	A	NH	A	LQ	LQ
World Championship	LQ	LQ	LQ	LQ	LQ	LQ	LQ	LQ	LQ	LQ	LQ	LQ	A	LQ	LQ
Non-ranking tournaments
The Masters	LQ	LQ	A	WD	A	LQ	LQ	A	LQ	LQ	LQ	LQ	A	A	A
Former ranking tournaments
Classic	LQ	Tournament Not Held													
Strachan Open (Note: The event run under different name as Strachan Challenge (1992/1993–1993/1994))	LQ	MR	NR	Tournament Not Held											
Dubai Classic (Note: The event run under different names as Thailand Classic (1995/1996) and Asian Classic (1996/1997))	LQ	LQ	LQ	LQ	LQ	LQ	Tournament Not Held								
Thailand Masters (Note: The event run under different names as Asian Open (1991/1992–1992/1993) and Thailand Open (1993/1994–1996/1997))	WD	LQ	LQ	LQ	LQ	LQ	A	LQ	A	A	A	NR	Not Held		
British Open	2R	LQ	LQ	LQ	LQ	LQ	A	LQ	A	LQ	Tournament Not Held				
Irish Masters	Non-Ranking Event											LQ	Not Held		
Australian Goldfields Open (Note: The event run under different names as Australian Open (1994/1995) and Australian Masters (1995/1996))	Tournament Not Held			NR		Not Held							A	LQ	NH
Shoot-Out	Tournament Not Held												A	A	RV

Performance Table Legend
LQ	lost in the qualifying draw	#R	lost in the early rounds of the tournament (WR = Wildcard round, RR = Round robin)	QF	lost in the quarter-finals
SF	lost in the semi-finals	F	lost in the final	W	won the tournament
DNQ	did not qualify for the tournament	A	did not participate in the tournament	WD	withdrew from the tournament
DQ	disqualified from the tournament				

NH / Not Held	event was not held.
NR / Non-Ranking Event	event is/was no longer a ranking event.
R / Ranking Event	event is/was a ranking event.
MR / Minor-Ranking Event	event is/was a minor-ranking event.
