= 2015 Shanghai Masters =

Bank of Communications OTO Shanghai Masters

Tournament information
- Dates: 14–20 September 2015
- Venue: Shanghai Grand Stage
- City: Shanghai
- Country: China
- Organisation: World Snooker
- Format: Ranking event
- Total prize fund: £465,200
- Winner's share: £85,000
- Highest break: Luca Brecel (BEL) (140)

Final
- Champion: Kyren Wilson (ENG)
- Runner-up: Judd Trump (ENG)
- Score: 10–9

The 2015 Bank of Communications OTO Shanghai Masters was a professional ranking snooker tournament that took place between 14 and 20 September 2015 at the Shanghai Grand Stage in Shanghai, China. The ninth edition of the tournament since it was first held in 2007, it was the second ranking event of the 2015/2016 season.

Stuart Bingham was the defending champion, but he lost 3–6 against Judd Trump in the semi-finals.

Kyren Wilson won his first ranking title, defeating Trump 10–9 in the final.

== Prize fund ==
The breakdown of prize money from this year is shown below:

- Winner: £85,000
- Runner-up: £35,000
- Semi-final: £19,500
- Quarter-final: £12,000
- Last 16: £8,000
- Last 32: £6,000
- Last 48: £3,000
- Last 64: £2,000
- Last 96: £500
- Non-televised highest break: £200
- Televised highest break: £2,000
- Total: £465,200

== Wildcard round ==
These matches were played in Shanghai on 14 and 15 September 2015.

Match		Score	
WC1	Jamie Jones (WAL)	1–5	Fang Xiongman (CHN)
WC2	Mike Dunn (ENG)	5–0	Niu Zhuang (CHN)
WC3	Robert Milkins (ENG)	5–0	Chen Zifan (CHN)
WC4	Tom Ford (ENG)	5–2	Han Bin (CHN)
WC5	Jamie Cope (ENG)	5–2	Lin Shuai (CHN)
WC6	Alan McManus (SCO)	5–2	Yao Pengcheng (CHN)
WC7	Kyren Wilson (ENG)	5–1	Wang Yuchen (CHN)
WC8	Peter Ebdon (ENG)	5–2	Yuan Sijun (CHN)

== Main draw ==
Last 32; Best of 9 frames
1	(England) Stuart Bingham	5
(China) Fang Xiongman	2
12	(Hong Kong) Marco Fu	3
(England) Mike Dunn	5
11	(Scotland) John Higgins	5
(China) Liang Wenbo	1
7	(England) Barry Hawkins	1
(England) Martin Gould	5
6	(England) Judd Trump	5
(England) Robert Milkins	0
9	(England) Ricky Walden	w/d
(England) Matthew Selt	w/o
13	(Wales) Mark Williams	5
(England) Tom Ford	1
4	(Australia) Neil Robertson	4
(England) Jamie Cope	5
3	(China) Ding Junhui	5
(Scotland) Alan McManus	1
16	(Scotland) Graeme Dott	3
(Wales) Ryan Day	5
14	(Scotland) Stephen Maguire	1
(England) Michael Holt	5
8	(England) Joe Perry	2
(England) Kyren Wilson	5
5	(England) Shaun Murphy	5
(England) Peter Ebdon	4
15	(Wales) Michael White	1
(England) Mark Davis	5
12	(Northern Ireland) Mark Allen	5
(Belgium) Luca Brecel	3
2	(England) Mark Selby	w/d
(England) David Grace	w/o

Last 16; Best of 9 frames
1	(England) Stuart Bingham	5
(England) Mike Dunn	1
11	(Scotland) John Higgins	3
(England) Martin Gould	5
6	(England) Judd Trump	5
(England) Matthew Selt	4
13	(Wales) Mark Williams	5
(England) Jamie Cope	3
3	(China) Ding Junhui	5
(Wales) Ryan Day	4
(England) Michael Holt	1
(England) Kyren Wilson	5
5	(England) Shaun Murphy	3
(England) Mark Davis	5
12	(Northern Ireland) Mark Allen	5
(England) David Grace	1

Quarter-finals; Best of 9 frames
1	(England) Stuart Bingham	5
(England) Martin Gould	4
6	(England) Judd Trump	5
13	(Wales) Mark Williams	1
3	(China) Ding Junhui	4
(England) Kyren Wilson	5
(England) Mark Davis	1
12	(Northern Ireland) Mark Allen	5

Semi-finals; Best of 11 frames
1	(England) Stuart Bingham	3
6	(England) Judd Trump	6
(England) Kyren Wilson	6
12	(Northern Ireland) Mark Allen	1

Final; Best of 19 frames
6	(England) Judd Trump	9
(England) Kyren Wilson	10

- Ricky Walden withdrew to attend the birth of his son, which took place on 14 September.
- Mark Selby withdrew as his father-in-law died shortly before the tournament began.

== Final ==
Final: Best of 19 frames. Referee: Brendan Moore. Shanghai Grand Stage, Shanghai, China, 20 September 2015.
Judd Trump (6); England	9–10	Kyren Wilson; England
Afternoon: 1–62, 81–0 (81), 24–71, 74–0 (72), 42–68, 41–71 (71), 60–13, 22–76 (58), 40–78 (62); Evening: 33–75, 121–0 (115), 46–83 (68), 86–7 (76), 58–45 (50), 70–29, 22–80, 90–0 (89), 79–40 (60), 0–78 (75)
115	Highest break	75
1	Century breaks	0
7	50+ breaks	5

== Qualifying ==
These matches were held between 5 and 9 August 2015 at the Barnsley Metrodome in Barnsley, England.

Round 1 Best of 9 frames
(England) Ian Burns	5
(England) Sean O'Sullivan	4
(China) Zhou Yuelong	5
(England) Hammad Miah	4
(England) Craig Steadman	5
(England) Kuldesh Johal	4
(England) Oliver Lines	3
(England) Jimmy White	5
(England) Michael Wasley	5
(England) James Cahill	3
(China) Zhang Anda	5
(England) Andy Hicks	1
(England) Liam Highfield	5
(England) Michael Wild	0
(England) Chris Melling	5
(Wales) Daniel Wells	4
(Malta) Tony Drago	1
(Scotland) Ross Muir	5
(England) Zak Surety	5
(England) Jason Weston	1
(Iran) Hossein Vafaei	5
(England) Alfie Burden	1
(Scotland) Rhys Clark	4
(England) Paul Davison	5
(China) Lü Chenwei	4
(Republic of Ireland) Leo Fernandez	5
(England) Allan Taylor	w/o
(Pakistan) Hamza Akbar	w/d
(England) Mitchell Mann	1
(England) Jamie Cope	5
(England) Martin O'Donnell	5
(England) Jake Nicholson	1
(China) Lu Ning	5
(England) Sanderson Lam	2
(Scotland) Scott Donaldson	5
(Northern Ireland) Jordan Brown	2
(Wales) Lee Walker	5
(England) Ashley Hugill	2
(Scotland) Michael Leslie	5
(England) Luke Simmonds	1
(England) Barry Pinches	1
(Wales) Gareth Allen	5
(England) Michael Georgiou	3
(Wales) Alex Taubman	5
(England) Joel Walker	5
(England) Adam Duffy	2
(Australia) Vinnie Calabrese	5
(Malaysia) Thor Chuan Leong	1
(Wales) Duane Jones	3
(England) Sydney Wilson	5
(Thailand) Thanawat Thirapongpaiboon	2
(Scotland) Eden Sharav	5
(China) Tian Pengfei	5
(Thailand) Noppon Saengkham	1
(Scotland) Fraser Patrick	5
(Isle of Man) Darryl Hill	3
(England) Steven Hallworth	1
(China) Zhang Yong	5
(England) Chris Wakelin	0
(England) Nigel Bond	5
(England) David Grace	5
(England) Joe O'Connor	3
(England) Ian Glover	3
(Thailand) James Wattana	5

Round 2 Best of 9 frames
(England) Mark Joyce	5
(England) Ian Burns	3
(Republic of Ireland) David Morris	5
(China) Zhou Yuelong	3
(England) Mike Dunn	5
(England) Craig Steadman	4
(England) Jack Lisowski	5
(England) Jimmy White	0
(England) Andrew Higginson	5
(England) Michael Wasley	4
(England) Stuart Carrington	2
(China) Zhang Anda	5
(Finland) Robin Hull	2
(England) Liam Highfield	5
(Republic of Ireland) Ken Doherty	5
(England) Chris Melling	0
(Thailand) Dechawat Poomjaeng	5
(Scotland) Ross Muir	3
(Northern Ireland) Gerard Greene	5
(England) Zak Surety	0
(England) Anthony Hamilton	2
(Iran) Hossein Vafaei	5
(Northern Ireland) Joe Swail	5
(England) Paul Davison	2
(England) Sam Baird	4
(Republic of Ireland) Leo Fernandez	5
(England) Tom Ford	5
(England) Allan Taylor	2
(England) Jimmy Robertson	2
(England) Jamie Cope	5
(England) Robbie Williams	5
(England) Martin O'Donnell	4
(Norway) Kurt Maflin	4
(China) Lu Ning	5
(England) Rory McLeod	5
(Scotland) Scott Donaldson	3
(Wales) Dominic Dale	5
(Wales) Lee Walker	4
(England) Rod Lawler	5
(Scotland) Michael Leslie	1
(India) Aditya Mehta	1
(Wales) Gareth Allen	5
(China) Li Hang	5
(Wales) Alex Taubman	3
(England) Mark King	5
(England) Joel Walker	1
(England) Kyren Wilson	5
(Australia) Vinnie Calabrese	0
(England) Peter Lines	5
(England) Sydney Wilson	1
(Scotland) Jamie Burnett	5
(Scotland) Eden Sharav	0
(China) Yu Delu	1
(China) Tian Pengfei	5
(Wales) Matthew Stevens	5
(Scotland) Fraser Patrick	0
(England) David Gilbert	5
(China) Zhang Yong	0
(Belgium) Luca Brecel	5
(England) Nigel Bond	2
(Thailand) Thepchaiya Un-Nooh	2
(England) David Grace	5
(China) Cao Yupeng	5
(Thailand) James Wattana	1

Round 3 Best of 9 frames
(England) Mark Joyce	4
(Republic of Ireland) David Morris	5
(England) Mike Dunn	5
(England) Jack Lisowski	2
(England) Andrew Higginson	5
(China) Zhang Anda	4
(England) Liam Highfield	5
(Republic of Ireland) Ken Doherty	0
(Thailand) Dechawat Poomjaeng	3
(Northern Ireland) Gerard Greene	5
(Iran) Hossein Vafaei	4
(Northern Ireland) Joe Swail	5
(Republic of Ireland) Leo Fernandez	3
(England) Tom Ford	5
(England) Jamie Cope	5
(England) Robbie Williams	1
(China) Lu Ning	1
(England) Rory McLeod	5
(Wales) Dominic Dale	5
(England) Rod Lawler	2
(Wales) Gareth Allen	1
(China) Li Hang	5
(England) Mark King	3
(England) Kyren Wilson	5
(England) Peter Lines	3
(Scotland) Jamie Burnett	5
(China) Tian Pengfei	5
(Wales) Matthew Stevens	0
(England) David Gilbert	3
(Belgium) Luca Brecel	5
(England) David Grace	5
(China) Cao Yupeng	4

Round 4 Best of 9 frames
(Wales) Jamie Jones	5
(Republic of Ireland) David Morris	3
(China) Xiao Guodong	4
(England) Mike Dunn	5
(China) Liang Wenbo	5
(England) Andrew Higginson	4
(England) Martin Gould	5
(England) Liam Highfield	2
(England) Robert Milkins	5
(Northern Ireland) Gerard Greene	3
(England) Matthew Selt	5
(Northern Ireland) Joe Swail	3
(England) Ben Woollaston	3
(England) Tom Ford	5
(England) Gary Wilson	4
(England) Jamie Cope	5
(Scotland) Alan McManus	5
(England) Rory McLeod	4
(Wales) Ryan Day	5
(Wales) Dominic Dale	1
(England) Michael Holt	5
(China) Li Hang	3
(Scotland) Anthony McGill	4
(England) Kyren Wilson	5
(England) Peter Ebdon	5
(Scotland) Jamie Burnett	1
(England) Mark Davis	5
(China) Tian Pengfei	4
(Republic of Ireland) Fergal O'Brien	4
(Belgium) Luca Brecel	5
(England) Ali Carter	3
(England) David Grace	5

== Century breaks ==
=== Qualifying stage centuries ===
- 140, 131 – Cao Yupeng
- 138 – Zhou Yuelong
- 136 – Anthony Hamilton
- 136 – Martin O'Donnell
- 134, 104 – Zhang Anda
- 133, 117 – Tom Ford
- 133, 114 – Tian Pengfei
- 131 – Zhang Yong
- 129 – Mike Dunn
- 128, 102 – Kyren Wilson
- 128 – Fergal O'Brien
- 128 – Jimmy Robertson
- 127 – Liam Highfield
- 126 – Mark King
- 121, 108, 104 – Luca Brecel
- 121, 101 – Anthony McGill
- 121 – Nigel Bond
- 119 – Joel Walker
- 119 – Kurt Maflin
- 118 – Dominic Dale
- 113 – Robert Milkins
- 110 – Joe Swail
- 110 – Hossein Vafaei
- 110 – Alex Taubman
- 109 – Gerard Greene
- 108, 100 – Ross Muir
- 108 – Li Hang
- 106, 104 – Jamie Burnett
- 106, 103 – Jamie Cope
- 103 – Rory McLeod
- 102 – Liang Wenbo
- 102 – Matthew Stevens
- 101 – Paul Davison
- 100 – Rod Lawler
- 100 – Rhys Clark
- 100 – Lee Walker

=== Televised stage centuries ===
- 140 – Luca Brecel
- 134 – Peter Ebdon
- 128, 108, 104 – Mark Williams
- 126 – Mark Davis
- 123 – Kyren Wilson
- 122, 115, 104, 100 – Judd Trump
- 122, 100 – Alan McManus
- 120 – Mike Dunn
- 118, 103 – Stuart Bingham
- 115, 104 – Fang Xiongman
- 109 – Martin Gould
- 107 – Shaun Murphy
- 104 – Ding Junhui
- 101 – Mark Allen
- 101 – Michael Holt
