= 1982 World Amateur Snooker Championship =

Tournament information
- Dates: 6–19 September 1982
- Venue: Village Square Leisure Centre
- City: Calgary
- Country: Canada
- Organisation: Billiards and Snooker Control Council, International Billiards and Snooker Federation
- Format: Round-robin and knockout
- Highest break: Terry Parsons (WAL), 103

Final
- Champion: Terry Parsons (WAL)
- Runner-up: Jim Bear (CAN)
- Score: 11–8

The 1982 World Amateur Snooker Championship was the tenth edition of the tournament also known as the IBSF World Snooker Championship. The 1982 tournament was played in Calgary, Canada from 6 to 19 September 1982. Terry Parsons defeated Jim Bear 11–8 in the final to win the title.

== Tournament summary ==
The first World Amateur Snooker Championship was held in 1963, and, after the second event in 1966, had been played every two years since. The 1982 tournament was held at the Village Square Leisure Centre in Calgary from 6 to 19 September 1982.

There were 36 competitors, who played in four Round-robin groups each of nine entrants from 6 to 14 September. The top two players from each group qualified for the quarter-finals. Dene O'Kane was the top seed for the event, but failed to progress, finishing third in his group behind Joe Grech and Tony Kearney.

Bear took a 5–1 lead in the final during the first session and extended this to 7–1 before Parsons won the next five frames to leave Bear 7–5 ahead going into the concluding session. Parsons then won a further three frames, to lead 8–7. Bear equalised at 8–8, but Parsons then added the next three frames to his tally to secure an 11–8 victory.

The highest break of the competition was 103, compiled by Parsons.

== Main draw ==
Players in bold denote match winners.

**Quarter-finals**; Best of 9 frames
**Wayne Jones (WAL)**	**5**
Tony Kearney (IRE)	1
**Terry Parsons (WAL)**	**5**
Malcolm Bradley (ENG)	0
**Joe Grech (MLT)**	**5**
Paddy Browne (IRE)	3
**Jim Bear (CAN)**	**5**
Paul Mifsud (MLT)	2

**Semi-finals**; Best of 15 frames
Wayne Jones (WAL)	5
**Terry Parsons (WAL)**	**8**
Joe Grech (MLT)	7
**Jim Bear (CAN)**	**8**

**Final**; Best of 21 frames
**Terry Parsons (WAL)**	**11**
Jim Bear (CAN)	8
