= 1985 UK Championship =

1985 Coral UK Championship
Tournament information
- Dates: 15 November – 1 December 1985
- Venue: Preston Guild Hall
- City: Preston
- Country: England
- Organisation: WPBSA
- Format: Ranking event
- Total prize fund: £120,000
- Winner's share: £24,000
- Highest break: Willie Thorne (ENG) (140)

Final
- Champion: Steve Davis (ENG)
- Runner-up: Willie Thorne (ENG)
- Score: 16–14

The 1985 UK Championship (officially the 1985 Coral UK Championship) was a professional ranking snooker tournament that took place between 15 November and 1 December 1985 at the Guild Hall in Preston, England. The last-16 televised stages were shown on the BBC from 23 November through to the end of the championship. The event was sponsored by sports betting company Coral.

Steve Davis won his fourth UK Championship title by defeating Willie Thorne 16–14 in the final. Thorne had led 12–6 and 13–8, but the match turned after Thorne missed a straightforward blue off its spot which would have given him a 14–8 lead. Davis subsequently won the frame and seven of the next eight to clinch the title. Stephen Hendry made his debut in the tournament, aged sixteen, but lost his first qualifying round match 2–9 to Omprakesh Agrawal.

The highest break of the tournament was a 140 made by Willie Thorne during the non-televised stages; the highest break of the televised stages was a 135 made by Neal Foulds.

The final attracted an average of 10.8 million viewers on BBC1, peaking at 13.6 million.

== Prize fund ==
The breakdown of prize money for this year is shown below:

- Winner £24,000
- Runner-up £14,000
- Total £120,000

== Main draw ==
Last 64; Best of 17 frames
(England) Steve Davis	9
(Republic of Ireland) Dessie Sheehan	1
(Malta) Tony Drago	9
(England) Mark Wildman	5
(England) Tony Meo	9
(England) Steve Longworth	5
(England) Danny Fowler	9
(South Africa) Perrie Mans	2
(Wales) Doug Mountjoy	9
(Canada) Mario Morra	2
(England) Barry West	9
(Republic of Ireland) Eugene Hughes	3
(Wales) Ray Reardon	9
(England) Graham Miles	4
(Scotland) Murdo MacLeod	9
(Northern Ireland) Tommy Murphy	7
(England) Jimmy White	9
(England) Malcolm Bradley	4
(Wales) Tony Chappel	9
(New Zealand) Dene O'Kane	5
(Northern Ireland) Alex Higgins	9
(England) Ray Edmonds	8
(England) Fred Davis	9
(Canada) Bill Werbeniuk	7
(England) David Taylor	9
(Canada) Bernie Mikkelsen	6
(Australia) John Campbell	9
(England) Paul Medati	7
(England) Tony Knowles	9
(Northern Ireland) Joe O'Boye	5
(England) John Spencer	9
(England) Vic Harris	5
(Canada) Cliff Thorburn	9
(England) Les Dodd	4
(England) John Parrott	9
(Scotland) Eddie Sinclair	2
(England) Willie Thorne	9
(Republic of Ireland) Paddy Browne	6
(England) John Virgo	9
(Wales) Wayne Jones	7
(South Africa) Silvino Francisco	9
(Canada) Jim Wych	8
(England) Dave Martin	9
(England) Mike Darrington	3
(Wales) Terry Griffiths	9
(England) Tony Jones	5
(England) Dean Reynolds	9
(Northern Ireland) Jack McLaughlin	7
(Canada) Kirk Stevens	9
(Wales) Steve Newbury	7
(England) Mike Hallett	9
(England) Jim Meadowcroft	1
(South Africa) Peter Francisco	9
(Australia) Eddie Charlton	5
(England) Rex Williams	9
(Australia) Warren King	5
(England) Joe Johnson	9
(Thailand) Sakchai Sim Ngam	4
(England) Neal Foulds	9
(Republic of Ireland) Patsy Fagan	5
(Northern Ireland) Dennis Taylor	9
(Canada) Jim Bear	3
(England) Graham Cripsey	9
(Wales) Cliff Wilson	7

Last 32; Best of 17 frames
(England) Steve Davis	9
(Malta) Tony Drago	2
(England) Tony Meo	9
(England) Danny Fowler	2
(Wales) Doug Mountjoy	4
(England) Barry West	9
(Wales) Ray Reardon	5
(Scotland) Murdo MacLeod	9
(England) Jimmy White	9
(Wales) Tony Chappel	5
(Northern Ireland) Alex Higgins	9
(England) Fred Davis	2
(England) David Taylor	9
(Australia) John Campbell	4
(England) Tony Knowles	9
(England) John Spencer	7
(Canada) Cliff Thorburn	9
(England) John Parrott	6
(England) Willie Thorne	9
(England) John Virgo	8
(South Africa) Silvino Francisco	9
(England) Dave Martin	6
(Wales) Terry Griffiths	9
(England) Dean Reynolds	7
(Canada) Kirk Stevens	9
(England) Mike Hallett	5
(South Africa) Peter Francisco	7
(England) Rex Williams	9
(England) Joe Johnson	8
(England) Neal Foulds	9
(Northern Ireland) Dennis Taylor	9
(England) Graham Cripsey	2

Last 16; Best of 17 frames
(England) Steve Davis	9
(England) Tony Meo	5
(England) Barry West	9
(Scotland) Murdo MacLeod	4
(England) Jimmy White	9
(Northern Ireland) Alex Higgins	6
(England) David Taylor	7
(England) Tony Knowles	9
(Canada) Cliff Thorburn	7
(England) Willie Thorne	9
(South Africa) Silvino Francisco	5
(Wales) Terry Griffiths	9
(Canada) Kirk Stevens	9
(England) Rex Williams	7
(England) Neal Foulds	5
(Northern Ireland) Dennis Taylor	9

Quarter-finals; Best of 17 frames
(England) Steve Davis	9
(England) Barry West	1
(England) Jimmy White	9
(England) Tony Knowles	4
(England) Willie Thorne	9
(Wales) Terry Griffiths	7
(Canada) Kirk Stevens	1
(Northern Ireland) Dennis Taylor	9

Semi-finals; Best of 17 frames
(England) Steve Davis	9
(England) Jimmy White	5
(England) Willie Thorne	9
(Northern Ireland) Dennis Taylor	7

Final; Best of 31 frames
(England) Steve Davis	16
(England) Willie Thorne	14

== Final ==
Final: Best of 31 frames. Referee: Jim Thorpe; The Guild Hall, Preston, England, 30 November and 1 December 1985.
Steve Davis; England	16–14	Willie Thorne; England
First session: 76–25, 23–112 (112), 84–47, 0–90, 34–98 (70), 6–83 (69), 78–1; Second session: 85–4, 0–122 (121), 121–5 (104), 11–95 (87), 30–101 (66), 71–67 (Thorne 67), 39–75 (63); Third session: 59–88, 56–69 (Davis 56, Thorne 68), 0–135 (115), 30–75 (61), 80–0 (76), 89–25 (64), 0–98; Fourth session: 68–59, 63–1 (63), 70–13, 71–10, 69–41, 12–96 (96), 129–1 (86), 64–19, 70–19
104	Highest break	121
1	Century breaks	3
6	50+ breaks	12

== Century breaks ==
- 140, 121, 115, 112, 112, 104, 102 – Willie Thorne
- 137, 101 – Alex Higgins
- 136, 130, 105 – Neal Foulds
- 135 – Dennis Taylor
- 134, 103 – Peter Francisco
- 130 – Mario Morra
- 128, 115 – Cliff Thorburn
- 128, 111, 109 – Terry Griffiths
- 127, 122, 115, 106, 104, 102 – Steve Davis
- 122 – Steve Newbury
- 119, 108, 104, 103 – John Virgo
- 110 – Omprakesh Agrawal
- 109 – John Spencer
- 109 – Kirk Stevens
- 107, 107, 101, 100 – Jimmy White
- 106 – John Campbell
- 105 – Joe Johnson
- 101 – Ray Edmonds
- 101 – Warren King
