= Omprakesh Agrawal =

Indian snooker player (1955–1994)

Personal information
- Born: 27 April 1955 Parel, Mumbai, India
- Died: 15 May 1994 (aged 39)

Sport
- Country: India
- Sport: Snooker
- Professional: 1985–1987
- Highest ranking: 89 (1986/1987)

Omprakesh Bankelal Agrawal also known as either Omprakash Agarwal or Omprakash Agrawal (27 April 1955 – 15 May 1994), was an Indian professional snooker player. As an amateur, he was world champion in 1984.

== Career ==
Born in 1955, Agrawal played at the 1984 World Amateur Snooker Championship, where he won seven of nine matches to qualify in second place from his group, before defeating Dilwyn John of Wales and Jon Wright of England to reach the final. There, he faced defending world champion Terry Parsons of Wales, winning the match 11–7 to become World Amateur champion. He also became the first snooker player outside the UK to win an amateur snooker world championship.

This enabled Agrawal to compete on the sport's main tour for the 1985/1986 season. He won his first-ever professional match, beating Paul Watchorn 5–2 in the Matchroom Trophy, but lost by the same scoreline in the next round to Danny Fowler. Agrawal followed this with victories over Jim Rempe and John Dunning in qualifying for the 1985 Grand Prix as he reached the last 64; at that stage, however, he was whitewashed 0–5 by the incumbent World Champion Steve Davis.

In the 1985 UK Championship, he was drawn against Stephen Hendry in the first round, and despite having lost the first frame, compiled a break of 110 in defeating him 9–2. In the next round, he led Mario Morra 8–6, but could not prevent an 8–9 loss.

Further defeats to Graham Miles in the British Open and Steve Newbury in the 1986 World Championship followed, but Agrawal's performances were sufficient for him to finish his first season ranked 89th.

The 1986/1987 season brought poor form; he played in only the International Open, the Grand Prix, the UK Championship, the Classic and the British Open, losing his first match in each tournament. Agrawal resigned his professional status in 1987.

== Death ==
Agrawal died of cancer in May 1994, aged 39.

== Performance and rankings timeline ==
Tournament	1985/ 86	1986/ 87
Ranking (Note: It shows the ranking at the beginning of the season)	(Note: New players on the Main Tour don't have a ranking)	89
Ranking tournaments
International Open (Note: The event was called the Matchroom Trophy (1985/1986))	LQ	LQ
Grand Prix	LQ	LQ
UK Championship	LQ	LQ
The Classic	LQ	LQ
British Open	LQ	LQ
World Championship	LQ	WD

Performance Table Legend
LQ	lost in the qualifying draw	#R	lost in the early rounds of the tournament (WR = Wildcard round, RR = Round robin)	QF	lost in the quarter-finals
SF	lost in the semi-finals	F	lost in the final	W	won the tournament
DNQ	did not qualify for the tournament	A	did not participate in the tournament	WD	withdrew from the tournament

NH / Not Held	means an event was not held.
NR / Non-Ranking Event	means an event is/was no longer a ranking event.
R / Ranking Event	means an event is/was a ranking event.
MR / Minor-Ranking Event	means an event is/was a minor-ranking event.

== Career finals ==
=== Amateur finals: 1 (1 title) ===
Outcome	No.	Year	Championship	Opponent in the final	Score
Winner	1.	1984	World Amateur Championship	(Wales) Terry Parsons	11–7
