= 2015 Australian Goldfields Open =

Australian Goldfields Open
Tournament information
- Dates: 29 June – 5 July 2015
- Venue: Bendigo Stadium
- City: Bendigo
- Country: Australia
- Organisation: World Snooker
- Format: Ranking event
- Total prize fund: $521,600
- Winner's share: $75,000
- Highest break: Ricky Walden (ENG) (142)

Final
- Champion: John Higgins (SCO)
- Runner-up: Martin Gould (ENG)
- Score: 9–8

The 2015 Australian Goldfields Open was a professional ranking snooker tournament that took place between 29 June and 5 July 2015 at the Bendigo Stadium in Bendigo, Australia. It was the first ranking event of the 2015/2016 season.

Judd Trump was the defending champion, but he lost 1–5 against Stephen Maguire in the quarter-finals.

John Higgins defeated Martin Gould 9–8 in the final to win the 27th ranking title of his career.

== Prize fund ==
The breakdown of prize money for this year is shown below:

- Winner: $75,000
- Runner-up: $32,000
- Semi-final: $20,000
- Quarter-final: $17,000
- Last 16: $12,000
- Last 32: $9,000
- Last 48: $2,000
- Last 64: $1000
- Last 96: $500
- Non-televised highest break: $100
- Televised highest break: $2,500
- Total: $521,600

== Wildcard round ==
Match		Score	
WC1	Matthew Selt (ENG)	5–0	Ben Judge (AUS)
WC2	Ben Woollaston (ENG)	3–5	Adrian Ridley (AUS)

== Main draw ==
Last 32; Best of 9 frames
1	(England) Judd Trump	5
(England) Jack Lisowski	0
15	(China) Xiao Guodong	3
(England) Ian Burns	5
11	(Scotland) Stephen Maguire	5
(England) Joel Walker	0
7	(England) Ricky Walden	5
(England) Andrew Higginson	3
8	(Hong Kong) Marco Fu	4
(England) Martin Gould	5
16	(England) Michael Holt	5
(Northern Ireland) Gerard Greene	0
9	(Northern Ireland) Mark Allen	2
(England) Mark Joyce	5
4	(Australia) Neil Robertson	4
(England) Matthew Selt	5
3	(England) Mark Selby	5
(England) Mark King	1
14	(England) Mark Davis	4
(Wales) Jamie Jones	5
13	(Wales) Michael White	5
(Iran) Hossein Vafaei	3
5	(England) Shaun Murphy	4
(England) Ali Carter	5
6	(England) Joe Perry	5
(Scotland) Jamie Burnett	3
12	(England) Robert Milkins	5
(Australia) Adrian Ridley	1
10	(Scotland) John Higgins	5
(England) Michael Georgiou	2
2	(England) Stuart Bingham	4
(Republic of Ireland) Fergal O'Brien	5

Last 16; Best of 9 frames
1	(England) Judd Trump	5
(England) Ian Burns	2
11	(Scotland) Stephen Maguire	5
7	(England) Ricky Walden	4
(England) Martin Gould	5
16	(England) Michael Holt	3
(England) Mark Joyce	4
(England) Matthew Selt	5
3	(England) Mark Selby	1
(Wales) Jamie Jones	5
13	(Wales) Michael White	5
(England) Ali Carter	4
6	(England) Joe Perry	5
12	(England) Robert Milkins	3
10	(Scotland) John Higgins	5
(Republic of Ireland) Fergal O'Brien	1

Quarter-finals; Best of 9 frames
1	(England) Judd Trump	1
11	(Scotland) Stephen Maguire	5
(England) Martin Gould	5
(England) Matthew Selt	1
(Wales) Jamie Jones	5
13	(Wales) Michael White	4
6	(England) Joe Perry	3
10	(Scotland) John Higgins	5

Semi-finals; Best of 11 frames
11	(Scotland) Stephen Maguire	1
(England) Martin Gould	6
(Wales) Jamie Jones	4
10	(Scotland) John Higgins	6

Final; Best of 17 frames
(England) Martin Gould	8
10	(Scotland) John Higgins	9

== Final ==
Final: Best of 17 frames. Referee: Olivier Marteel. Bendigo Stadium, Bendigo, Australia, 5 July 2015.
Martin Gould; England	8–9	John Higgins (10); Scotland
Afternoon: 8–90 (90), 57–58, 101–13 (101), 101–25 (86), 67–32, 89–5 (89), 0–126 (112), 12–66; Evening: 25–74, 13–82, 138–0 (138), 40–68 (68), 70–45 (55), 100–1 (58), 33–92 (60), 68–54, 8–89 (89)
138	Highest Break	112
2	Century Breaks	1
6	50+ Breaks	5

== Qualifying stages ==
The qualifying stages for this event took place at K2 in Crawley, England between 1–5 June 2015.

Round 1 Best of 9 frames
(England) Nigel Bond	5
(England) Sam Craigie	4
(England) Sydney Wilson	5
(England) Oliver Brown	2
(Australia) Vinnie Calabrese	5
(England) Billy Joe Castle	2
(England) Jimmy White	4
(England) Saqib Nasir	5
(England) Jamie Cope	5
(Scotland) Scott Macfarlane	2
(England) Adam Duffy	5
(England) Ashley Carty	4
(England) Jason Weston	2
(England) Hammad Miah	5
(England) Paul Davison	5
(England) Sam Harvey	1
(England) James Cahill	5
(England) Jeff Cundy	2
(Wales) Duane Jones	5
(England) Samuel Thistlewhite	1
(China) Lu Ning	5
(England) Joe O'Connor	4
(Scotland) Fraser Patrick	5
(England) Michael Williams	0
(China) Lu Chenwei	1
(England) Nick Jennings	5
(Scotland) Eden Sharav	5
(England) Andrew Milliard	3
(China) Zhao Xintong	5
(England) Kuldesh Johal	1
(Wales) Daniel Wells	5
(England) Jamie Curtis-Barrett	3
(Scotland) Rhys Clark	5
(England) Grant Miles	1
(England) Allan Taylor	5
(England) Simon Dent	2
(England) Chris Wakelin	5
(Wales) Alex Taubman	1
(China) Zhang Yong	1
(England) Ashley Hugill	5
(China) Yan Bingtao	w/d
(China) Chen Zhe	w/o
(Iran) Hossein Vafaei	5
(England) Charlie Walters	3
(England) Sanderson Lam	5
(England) Matthew Day	3
(England) Ian Glover	5
(Scotland) Ross Higgins	0
(England) Steven Hallworth	5
(England) Jake Nicholson	0
(Wales) Gareth Allen	5
(England) Adam Edge	3
(England) Martin O'Donnell	5
(Republic of Ireland) Leo Fernandez	3
(England) Alfie Burden	1
(Wales) David John	5
(Scotland) Ross Muir	5
(England) Callum Downing	4
(England) Sean O'Sullivan	5
(England) Brandon Sargeant	2
(Isle of Man) Darryl Hill	3
(Scotland) Dylan Craig	5
(England) David Grace	5
(England) Christopher Keogan	4

Round 2 Best of 9 frames
(England) Rory McLeod	5
(England) Nigel Bond	2
(England) Jack Lisowski	5
(England) Sydney Wilson	2
(England) Michael Wasley	5
(Australia) Vinnie Calabrese	1
(England) Ian Burns	5
(England) Saqib Nasir	1
(England) Joel Walker	5
(England) Jamie Cope	2
(Scotland) Scott Donaldson	1
(England) Adam Duffy	5
(England) Anthony Hamilton	5
(England) Hammad Miah	1
(England) Andrew Higginson	5
(England) Paul Davison	2
(Scotland) Michael Leslie	5
(England) James Cahill	3
(England) Sam Baird	5
(Wales) Duane Jones	1
(Republic of Ireland) David Morris	5
(China) Lu Ning	2
(England) Tom Ford	1
(Scotland) Fraser Patrick	5
(England) Robbie Williams	5
(England) Nick Jennings	2
(England) Mark Joyce	5
(Scotland) Eden Sharav	1
(England) Barry Pinches	2
(China) Zhao Xintong	5
(China) Zhang Anda	5
(Wales) Daniel Wells	2
(China) Li Hang	5
(Scotland) Rhys Clark	1
(England) Stuart Carrington	4
(England) Allan Taylor	5
(England) Craig Steadman	0
(England) Chris Wakelin	5
(England) Liam Highfield	5
(England) Ashley Hugill	0
(Wales) Lee Walker	5
(China) Chen Zhe	2
(England) Zak Surety	3
(Iran) Hossein Vafaei	5
(Republic of Ireland) Ken Doherty	5
(England) Sanderson Lam	1
(England) Kyren Wilson	5
(England) Ian Glover	3
(England) Oliver Lines	5
(England) Steven Hallworth	3
(Scotland) Jamie Burnett	5
(Wales) Gareth Allen	1
(China) Zhou Yuelong	5
(England) Martin O'Donnell	3
(England) Peter Lines	5
(Wales) David John	1
(England) Michael Georgiou	5
(Scotland) Ross Muir	0
(India) Aditya Mehta	5
(England) Sean O'Sullivan	4
(Northern Ireland) Joe Swail	5
(Scotland) Dylan Craig	0
(England) Mitchell Mann	5
(England) David Grace	4

Round 3 Best of 9 frames
(England) Rory McLeod	4
(England) Jack Lisowski	5
(England) Michael Wasley	2
(England) Ian Burns	5
(England) Joel Walker	5
(England) Adam Duffy	3
(England) Anthony Hamilton	3
(England) Andrew Higginson	5
(Scotland) Michael Leslie	5
(England) Sam Baird	0
(Republic of Ireland) David Morris	5
(Scotland) Fraser Patrick	3
(England) Robbie Williams	1
(England) Mark Joyce	5
(China) Zhao Xintong	3
(China) Zhang Anda	5
(China) Li Hang	4
(England) Allan Taylor	5
(England) Chris Wakelin	5
(England) Liam Highfield	2
(Wales) Lee Walker	4
(Iran) Hossein Vafaei	5
(Republic of Ireland) Ken Doherty	4
(England) Kyren Wilson	5
(England) Oliver Lines	2
(Scotland) Jamie Burnett	5
(China) Zhou Yuelong	5
(England) Peter Lines	3
(England) Michael Georgiou	5
(India) Aditya Mehta	4
(Northern Ireland) Joe Swail	5
(England) Mitchell Mann	3

Round 4 Best of 9 frames
(England) Jimmy Robertson	1
(England) Jack Lisowski	5
(England) Rod Lawler	4
(England) Ian Burns	5
(England) Gary Wilson	3
(England) Joel Walker	5
(England) Mike Dunn	3
(England) Andrew Higginson	5
(England) Martin Gould	5
(Scotland) Michael Leslie	1
(Northern Ireland) Gerard Greene	5
(Republic of Ireland) David Morris	0
(Belgium) Luca Brecel	4
(England) Mark Joyce	5
(England) Matthew Selt	5
(China) Zhang Anda	1
(England) Mark King	5
(England) Allan Taylor	4
(Wales) Jamie Jones	5
(England) Chris Wakelin	3
(Wales) Dominic Dale	3
(Iran) Hossein Vafaei	5
(England) Ali Carter	5
(England) Kyren Wilson	1
(England) Peter Ebdon	4
(Scotland) Jamie Burnett	5
(England) Ben Woollaston	5
(China) Zhou Yuelong	2
(England) David Gilbert	4
(England) Michael Georgiou	5
(Republic of Ireland) Fergal O'Brien	5
(Northern Ireland) Joe Swail	2

== Century breaks ==
=== Qualifying stage centuries ===
- 133 – Michael Wasley
- 132, 127 – Zhang Anda
- 132 – Allan Taylor
- 130 – Andrew Higginson
- 130 – David Morris
- 127 – David Grace
- 122 – Ian Glover
- 118, 104, 101 – Chris Wakelin
- 115, 100 – Kyren Wilson
- 113 – Zhao Xintong
- 110, 100 – Barry Pinches
- 109 – James Cahill
- 108 – Ken Doherty
- 107, 102 – Rory McLeod
- 106 – Chen Zhe
- 106 – Peter Ebdon
- 105 – Andrew Higginson
- 105 – Peter Lines
- 104 – Daniel Wells
- 104 – Mike Dunn
- 102 – David Gilbert
- 101 – Michael Leslie
- 101 – Ian Burns
- 100 – Rhys Clark
- 100 – Jamie Cope
- 100 – Hammad Miah
- 100 – Jamie Burnett

=== Televised stage centuries ===
- 142 – Ricky Walden
- 141 – Mark Selby
- 138, 122, 109, 101, 100 – Martin Gould
- 137 – Joe Perry
- 136 – Robert Milkins
- 134, 133, 112 – John Higgins
- 132 – Jamie Jones
- 128 – Fergal O'Brien
- 114, 111, 102 – Judd Trump
- 114 – Ali Carter
- 106 – Mark Joyce
