= 2016 UK Championship =

Snooker tournament

2016 Betway UK Championship

Tournament information
- Dates: 22 November – 4 December 2016
- Venue: Barbican Centre
- City: York
- Country: England
- Organisation: World Snooker
- Format: Ranking event
- Total prize fund: £850,000
- Winner's share: £170,000
- Highest break: Mark Allen (NIR) (147)

Final
- Champion: Mark Selby (ENG)
- Runner-up: Ronnie O'Sullivan (ENG)
- Score: 10–7

The 2016 UK Championship (officially the 2016 Betway UK Championship) was a professional ranking snooker tournament that took place from 22 November to 4 December 2016 at the Barbican Centre in York, England. It was the tenth ranking event of the 2016/2017 season.

Neil Robertson was the defending champion, but he lost 3–6 in the first round to Peter Lines.

In his last 64 match against Barry Hawkins, Fergal O'Brien made 5 centuries, setting up a new record in a best of 11 match.

Mark Allen made the 124th official maximum break in the 7th frame of his last 64 match against Rod Lawler. It was Allen's first maximum break, and it was the fifth time in a row, that a maximum was made in a UK Championship.

105 centuries were made during the tournament, breaking last year's record of 104, which included 10 from both Selby and O'Sullivan.

Mark Selby claimed his second UK title by beating Ronnie O'Sullivan 10–7 in the final. This was Selby's 10th ranking title. This also made him the sixth player to have completed the Triple Crown twice.

== Prize fund ==
The breakdown of prize money for this year is shown below:

- Winner: £170,000
- Runner-up: £75,000
- Semi-final: £35,000
- Quarter-final: £22,500
- Last 16: £15,000
- Last 32: £10,000
- Last 64: £5,000
- Highest break: £5,000
- Total: £850,000

The "rolling 147 prize" for a maximum break stood at £5,000.

== Main draw ==
=== Top half ===
==== Section 1 ====
Last 128; Best of 11 frames
1 | Neil Robertson (AUS) | 3
A | Peter Lines (ENG) | 6
64 | Alfie Burden (ENG) | 2
65 | Chris Wakelin (ENG) | 6
32 | Thepchaiya Un-Nooh (THA) | 5
97 | Liam Highfield (ENG) | 6
33 | Peter Ebdon (ENG) | 5
96 | Wang Yuchen (CHN) | 6
16 | Mark Williams (WAL) | 6
113 | Jason Weston (ENG) | 1
49 | Andrew Higginson (ENG) | 6
80 | Hossein Vafaei (IRN) | 4
17 | Ricky Walden (ENG) | 6
112 | Fang Xiongman (CHN) | 0
48 | Dechawat Poomjaeng (THA) | 4
81 | Scott Donaldson (SCO) | 6

Last 64; Best of 11 frames
A | (England) Peter Lines | 6
65 | (England) Chris Wakelin | 4
97 | (England) Liam Highfield | 6
96 | (China) Wang Yuchen | 5
16 | (Wales) Mark Williams | 6
49 | (England) Andrew Higginson | 2
17 | (England) Ricky Walden | 6
81 | (Scotland) Scott Donaldson | 2

Last 32; Best of 11 frames
A | (England) Peter Lines | 2
97 | (England) Liam Highfield | 6
16 | (Wales) Mark Williams | 6
17 | (England) Ricky Walden | 5

Last 16; Best of 11 frames
97 | (England) Liam Highfield | 5
16 | (Wales) Mark Williams | 6

==== Section 2 ====
Last 128; Best of 11 frames
41 | Matthew Stevens (WAL) | 6
88 | James Cahill (ENG) | 1
24 | Michael White (WAL) | 6
105 | Fraser Patrick (SCO) | 5
56 | Xiao Guodong (CHN) | 6
73 | John Astley (ENG) | 3
9 | Joe Perry (ENG) | 6
120 | Jamie Curtis-Barrett (ENG) | 3
40 | Mike Dunn (ENG) | 6
89 | Darryl Hill (IOM) | 1
25 | Matthew Selt (ENG) | 2
104 | Michael Georgiou (CYP) | 6
57 | Li Hang (CHN) | 5
72 | Rhys Clark (SCO) | 6
8 | Ronnie O'Sullivan (ENG) | 6
121 | Boonyarit Keattikun (THA) | 0

Last 64; Best of 11 frames
41 | (Wales) Matthew Stevens | 6
24 | (Wales) Michael White | 4
56 | (China) Xiao Guodong | 4
9 | (England) Joe Perry | 6
40 | (England) Mike Dunn | 4
104 | (Cyprus) Michael Georgiou | 6
72 | (Scotland) Rhys Clark | 0
8 | (England) Ronnie O'Sullivan | 6

Last 32; Best of 11 frames
41 | (Wales) Matthew Stevens | 6
9 | (England) Joe Perry | 2
104 | (Cyprus) Michael Georgiou | 1
8 | (England) Ronnie O'Sullivan | 6

Last 16; Best of 11 frames
41 | (Wales) Matthew Stevens | 2
8 | (England) Ronnie O'Sullivan | 6

==== Section 3 ====
Last 128; Best of 11 frames
5 | Ding Junhui (CHN) | 6
124 | Igor Figueiredo (BRA) | 5
60 | Joe Swail (NIR) | 5
69 | Ross Muir (SCO) | 6
28 | Alan McManus (SCO) | 6
101 | Michael Wild (ENG) | 5
37 | Jamie Jones (WAL) | 6
92 | Eden Sharav (SCO) | 1
12 | Ali Carter (ENG) | 6
117 | Christopher Keogan (ENG) | 1
53 | Robbie Williams (ENG) | 6
76 | Sunny Akani (THA) | 1
21 | David Gilbert (ENG) | 6
108 | Adam Duffy (ENG) | 2
44 | Mark Joyce (ENG) | 6
85 | Lee Walker (WAL) | 3

Last 64; Best of 11 frames
5 | (China) Ding Junhui | 6
69 | (Scotland) Ross Muir | 2
28 | (Scotland) Alan McManus | 2
37 | (Wales) Jamie Jones | 6
12 | (England) Ali Carter | 6
53 | (England) Robbie Williams | 2
21 | (England) David Gilbert | 6
44 | (England) Mark Joyce | 2

Last 32; Best of 11 frames
5 | (China) Ding Junhui | 2
37 | (Wales) Jamie Jones | 6
12 | (England) Ali Carter | 5
21 | (England) David Gilbert | 6

Last 16; Best of 11 frames
37 | (Wales) Jamie Jones | 6
21 | (England) David Gilbert | 2

==== Section 4 ====
Last 128; Best of 11 frames
45 | Jack Lisowski (ENG) | 5
84 | Mei Xiwen (CHN) | 6
20 | Martin Gould (ENG) | 6
109 | Gareth Allen (WAL) | 2
52 | Rory McLeod (ENG) | 6
77 | Jak Jones (WAL) | 3
13 | Marco Fu (HKG) | 6
116 | Josh Boileau (IRL) | 2
36 | Jimmy Robertson (ENG) | 6
93 | Rory Thor (MYS) | 0
29 | Mark Davis (ENG) | 6
100 | Sydney Wilson (ENG) | 3
61 | Oliver Lines (ENG) | 6
68 | Martin O'Donnell (ENG) | 5
4 | Judd Trump (ENG) | 6
125 | James Wattana (THA) | 2

Last 64; Best of 11 frames
84 | (China) Mei Xiwen | 6
20 | (England) Martin Gould | 3
52 | (England) Rory McLeod | 0
13 | (Hong Kong) Marco Fu | 6
36 | (England) Jimmy Robertson | 6
29 | (England) Mark Davis | 2
61 | (England) Oliver Lines | 6
4 | (England) Judd Trump | 2

Last 32; Best of 11 frames
84 | (China) Mei Xiwen | 4
13 | (Hong Kong) Marco Fu | 6
36 | (England) Jimmy Robertson | 0
61 | (England) Oliver Lines | 6

Last 16; Best of 11 frames
13 | (Hong Kong) Marco Fu | 6
61 | (England) Oliver Lines | 0

=== Bottom half ===
==== Section 5 ====
Last 128; Best of 11 frames
3 | Stuart Bingham (ENG) | 6
A | Adam Stefanow (POL) | 0
62 | Yu Delu (CHN) | 6
67 | Nigel Bond (ENG) | 3
30 | Luca Brecel (BEL) | 6
99 | Aditya Mehta (IND) | 0
35 | Mark King (ENG) | 2
94 | Sam Craigie (ENG) | 6
14 | Barry Hawkins (ENG) | 6
115 | David John (WAL) | 0
51 | Fergal O'Brien (IRL) | 6
78 | Zhang Yong (CHN) | 2
19 | Stephen Maguire (SCO) | 6
110 | Cao Yupeng (CHN) | 1
46 | David Grace (ENG) | 2
83 | Zhao Xintong (CHN) | 6

Last 64; Best of 11 frames
3 | (England) Stuart Bingham | 4
62 | (China) Yu Delu | 6
30 | (Belgium) Luca Brecel | 6
94 | (England) Sam Craigie | 5
14 | (England) Barry Hawkins | 5
51 | (Republic of Ireland) Fergal O'Brien | 6
19 | (Scotland) Stephen Maguire | 6
83 | (China) Zhao Xintong | 2

Last 32; Best of 11 frames
62 | (China) Yu Delu | 1
30 | (Belgium) Luca Brecel | 6
51 | (Republic of Ireland) Fergal O'Brien | 5
19 | (Scotland) Stephen Maguire | 6

Last 16; Best of 11 frames
30 | (Belgium) Luca Brecel | 6
19 | (Scotland) Stephen Maguire | 3

==== Section 6 ====
Last 128; Best of 11 frames
43 | Zhou Yuelong (CHN) | 6
86 | Duane Jones (WAL) | 3
22 | Michael Holt (ENG) | 6
107 | Kritsanut Lertsattayathorn (THA) | 2
54 | Stuart Carrington (ENG) | 5
75 | Yan Bingtao (CHN) | 6
11 | Liang Wenbo (CHN) | 6
118 | Kurt Dunham (AUS) | 1
38 | Dominic Dale (WAL) | 6
91 | Sanderson Lam (ENG) | 5
27 | Graeme Dott (SCO) | 6
102 | Ian Preece (WAL) | 1
59 | Robin Hull (FIN) | 6
70 | Jamie Cope (ENG) | 1
6 | Shaun Murphy (ENG) | 6
123 | Itaro Santos (BRA) | 3

Last 64; Best of 11 frames
43 | (China) Zhou Yuelong | 6
22 | (England) Michael Holt | 1
75 | (China) Yan Bingtao | 6
11 | (China) Liang Wenbo | 4
38 | (Wales) Dominic Dale | 6
27 | (Scotland) Graeme Dott | 3
59 | (Finland) Robin Hull | 3
6 | (England) Shaun Murphy | 6

Last 32; Best of 11 frames
43 | (China) Zhou Yuelong | 6
75 | (China) Yan Bingtao | 5
38 | (Wales) Dominic Dale | 5
6 | (England) Shaun Murphy | 6

Last 16; Best of 11 frames
43 | (China) Zhou Yuelong | 2
6 | (England) Shaun Murphy | 6

==== Section 7 ====
Last 128; Best of 11 frames
7 | John Higgins (SCO) | 6
122 | Alex Borg (MLT) | 3
58 | Ken Doherty (IRL) | 0
71 | Noppon Saengkham (THA) | 6
26 | Ben Woollaston (ENG) | 6
103 | Elliot Slessor (ENG) | 5
39 | Gary Wilson (ENG) | 3
90 | Paul Davison (ENG) | 6
10 | Mark Allen (NIR) | 6
119 | Chen Zhe (CHN) | 4
55 | Rod Lawler (ENG) | 6
74 | Anthony Hamilton (ENG) | 3
23 | Ryan Day (WAL) | 6
106 | Jimmy White (ENG) | 2
42 | Kurt Maflin (NOR) | 6
87 | Allan Taylor (ENG) | 0

Last 64; Best of 11 frames
7 | (Scotland) John Higgins | 6
71 | (Thailand) Noppon Saengkham | 4
26 | (England) Ben Woollaston | 6
90 | (England) Paul Davison | 4
10 | (Northern Ireland) Mark Allen | 6
55 | (England) Rod Lawler | 4
23 | (Wales) Ryan Day | 6
42 | (Norway) Kurt Maflin | 2

Last 32; Best of 11 frames
7 | (Scotland) John Higgins | 6
26 | (England) Ben Woollaston | 2
10 | (Northern Ireland) Mark Allen | 6
23 | (Wales) Ryan Day | 5

Last 16; Best of 11 frames
7 | (Scotland) John Higgins | 6
10 | (Northern Ireland) Mark Allen | 3

==== Section 8 ====
Last 128; Best of 11 frames
47 | Tian Pengfei (CHN) | 2
82 | Zhang Anda (CHN) | 6
18 | Anthony McGill (SCO) | 6
111 | Craig Steadman (ENG) | 5
50 | Sam Baird (ENG) | 6
79 | Sean O'Sullivan (ENG) | 2
15 | Kyren Wilson (ENG) | 3
114 | Mitchell Mann (ENG) | 6
34 | Tom Ford (ENG) | 5
95 | Hammad Miah (ENG) | 6
31 | Robert Milkins (ENG) | 6
98 | Hamza Akbar (PAK) | 1
63 | Ian Burns (ENG) | 5
66 | Daniel Wells (WAL) | 6
2 | Mark Selby (ENG) | 6
A | Andy Hicks (ENG) | 1

Last 64; Best of 11 frames
82 | (China) Zhang Anda | 6
18 | (Scotland) Anthony McGill | 3
50 | (England) Sam Baird | 2
114 | (England) Mitchell Mann | 6
95 | (England) Hammad Miah | 5
31 | (England) Robert Milkins | 6
66 | (Wales) Daniel Wells | 4
2 | (England) Mark Selby | 6

Last 32; Best of 11 frames
82 | (China) Zhang Anda | 6
114 | (England) Mitchell Mann | 3
31 | (England) Robert Milkins | 1
2 | (England) Mark Selby | 6

Last 16; Best of 11 frames
82 | (China) Zhang Anda | 1
2 | (England) Mark Selby | 6

=== Finals ===
Quarter-finals; Best of 11 frames
16 | (Wales) Mark Williams | 2
8 | (England) Ronnie O'Sullivan | 6
37 | (Wales) Jamie Jones | 5
13 | (Hong Kong) Marco Fu | 6
30 | (Belgium) Luca Brecel | 1
6 | (England) Shaun Murphy | 6
7 | (Scotland) John Higgins | 5
2 | (England) Mark Selby | 6

Semi-finals; Best of 11 frames
8 | (England) Ronnie O'Sullivan | 6
13 | (Hong Kong) Marco Fu | 5
6 | (England) Shaun Murphy | 2
2 | (England) Mark Selby | 6

Final; Best of 19 frames
8 | (England) Ronnie O'Sullivan | 7
2 | (England) Mark Selby | 10

== Final ==
Final: Best of 19 frames. Referee: Olivier Marteel. Barbican Centre, York, England, 4 December 2016.
| Ronnie O'Sullivan (8); England | 7–10 | Mark Selby (2); England |
Afternoon: 138–0 (124), 41–71, 63–0 (63), 8–103 (67), 0–82 (63), 32–58, 1–109 (51, 58), 0–128 (87); Evening: 9–65 (56), 144–0 (56, 80), 50–36, 134–0 (134), 0–137 (137), 130–0 (130), 82–0 (82), 1–134 (134), 5–118 (107)
| 134 | Highest break | 137 |
| 3 | Century breaks | 3 |
| 7 | 50+ breaks | 9 |

== Century breaks ==
- 147, 137, 136, 136, 132, 105 – Mark Allen
- 141, 126 – Mark King
- 140 – Jimmy Robertson
- 137, 134, 120, 119, 109, 107, 102, 101, 100, 100 – Mark Selby
- 137 – Scott Donaldson
- 136, 101 – Joe Perry
- 134, 131, 130, 130, 129, 124, 112, 106, 103, 101 – Ronnie O'Sullivan
- 134 – Michael Georgiou
- 132, 126, 106, 101 – John Higgins
- 131, 106 – Noppon Saengkham
- 130 – Alan McManus
- 129 – Barry Hawkins
- 128, 125, 118, 114, 100 – Marco Fu
- 128, 116, 112, 101, 101 – Stephen Maguire
- 127, 121, 108 – Stuart Bingham
- 127 – Jamie Jones
- 126, 118 – Ryan Day
- 126, 108, 102 – David Gilbert
- 126 – Gary Wilson
- 125, 110 – Liam Highfield
- 125, 105, 105 – Zhang Anda
- 123, 120 – Sam Baird
- 122 – Wang Yuchen
- 121 – Mark Williams
- 119, 115, 112, 110, 103 – Shaun Murphy
- 119 – Dominic Dale
- 119 – Xiao Guodong
- 116, 111, 100 – Ali Carter
- 113, 111, 111, 101, 100 – Fergal O'Brien
- 113 – Kurt Maflin
- 113 – Sanderson Lam
- 112 – Hammad Miah
- 112 – Robbie Williams
- 109 – Judd Trump
- 108 – Rory McLeod
- 107, 103 – Mark Davis
- 107, 100 – Liang Wenbo
- 106 – Mark Joyce
- 105 – Igor Figueiredo
- 104 – Anthony McGill
- 103 – Robin Hull
- 103 – Martin Gould
- 102, 102 – Luca Brecel
- 102 – Yan Bingtao
- 101 – Ben Woollaston
- 100 – Josh Boileau
