= 2016 Scottish Open (snooker) =

2016 Coral Scottish Open
Tournament information
- Dates: 12–18 December 2016
- Venue: Commonwealth Arena
- City: Glasgow
- Country: Scotland
- Organisation: World Snooker
- Format: Ranking event
- Total prize fund: £366,000
- Winner's share: £70,000
- Highest break: Marco Fu (HKG) (142)

Final
- Champion: Marco Fu (HKG)
- Runner-up: John Higgins (SCO)
- Score: 9–4

The 2016 Scottish Open (officially the 2016 Coral Scottish Open) was a professional ranking snooker tournament that began on 12 December and ended on 18 December 2016 at the Commonwealth Arena in Glasgow, Scotland. It was the eleventh ranking event of the 2016/2017 season.

The Scottish Open returned as a full-ranking event, being held as part of a new Home Nations Series introduced in the 2016/2017 season with the existing Welsh Open and new English Open and Northern Ireland Open tournaments. The winner of the Scottish Open is awarded the Stephen Hendry Trophy which is named in honour of Scottish seven-time world champion Stephen Hendry.

Ding Junhui was the defending champion but he decided not to compete this year. Marco Fu captured his third ranking title by beating John Higgins 9–4, after having trailed 1–4. He also made the tournament's highest break, a 142 in his second round 4–1 win over Liam Highfield.

== Prize fund ==
The breakdown of prize money for this year is shown below:

- Winner: £70,000
- Runner-up: £30,000
- Semi-final: £20,000
- Quarter-final: £10,000
- Last 16: £6,000
- Last 32: £3,500
- Last 64: £2,500
- Highest break: £2,000
- Total: £366,000

The "rolling 147 prize" for a maximum break stands at £5,000.

== Main draw ==
=== Top half ===
==== Section 1 ====
Last 128; Best of 7 frames
(England) Stuart Bingham (1)	3
(England) Mark Joyce	4
(Republic of Ireland) Josh Boileau	3
(China) Yu Delu	4
(England) Jamie Curtis-Barrett	0
(Wales) Daniel Wells	4
(Norway) Kurt Maflin	4
(England) Sam Craigie	1
(Scotland) Anthony McGill (16)	4
(England) John Astley	1
(England) Mitchell Mann	4
(England) Sam Baird	2
(England) Robbie Williams	1
(England) Sean O'Sullivan	4
(England) Mark King	4
(Australia) Kurt Dunham	0

Last 64; Best of 7 frames
(England) Mark Joyce	3
(China) Yu Delu	4
(Wales) Daniel Wells	4
(Norway) Kurt Maflin	1
(Scotland) Anthony McGill (16)	1
(England) Mitchell Mann	4
(England) Sean O'Sullivan	4
(England) Mark King	1

Last 32; Best of 7 frames
(China) Yu Delu	4
(Wales) Daniel Wells	3
(England) Mitchell Mann	1
(England) Sean O'Sullivan	4

Last 16; Best of 7 frames
(China) Yu Delu	4
(England) Sean O'Sullivan	3

==== Section 2 ====
Last 128; Best of 7 frames
(England) Ian Burns	w/o
(England) Martin Gould	w/d
(England) Alfie Burden	0
(China) Zhang Anda	4
(Thailand) Dechawat Poomjaeng	2
(England) Sydney Wilson	4
(China) Liang Wenbo (9)	4
(Isle of Man) Darryl Hill	2
(England) Mike Dunn	4
(England) Jason Weston	2
(Wales) Gareth Allen	4
(Scotland) Ross Muir	3
(Republic of Ireland) Ken Doherty	0
(Wales) Matthew Stevens	4
(England) Barry Hawkins (8)	4
(England) Hammad Miah	0

Last 64; Best of 7 frames
(England) Ian Burns	4
(China) Zhang Anda	0
(England) Sydney Wilson	1
(China) Liang Wenbo (9)	4
(England) Mike Dunn	4
(Wales) Gareth Allen	3
(Wales) Matthew Stevens	2
(England) Barry Hawkins (8)	4

Last 32; Best of 7 frames
(England) Ian Burns	0
(China) Liang Wenbo (9)	4
(England) Mike Dunn	1
(England) Barry Hawkins (8)	4

Last 16; Best of 7 frames
(China) Liang Wenbo (9)	4
(England) Barry Hawkins (8)	3

==== Section 3 ====
Last 128; Best of 7 frames
(Australia) Neil Robertson (5)	4
(Malaysia) Rory Thor	1
(England) Gary Wilson	4
(England) Allan Taylor	1
(Wales) Lee Walker	1
(Northern Ireland) Joe Swail	4
(Thailand) Kritsanut Lertsattayathorn	3
(England) Stuart Carrington	4
(Hong Kong) Marco Fu (12)	4
(England) Sanderson Lam	1
(England) Liam Highfield	4
(England) Tom Ford	1
(Thailand) Boonyarit Keattikun	0
(Finland) Robin Hull	4
(China) Cao Yupeng	0
(Wales) Michael White	4

Last 64; Best of 7 frames
(Australia) Neil Robertson (5)	4
(England) Gary Wilson	2
(Northern Ireland) Joe Swail	4
(England) Stuart Carrington	2
(Hong Kong) Marco Fu (12)	4
(England) Liam Highfield	1
(Finland) Robin Hull	4
(Wales) Michael White	1

Last 32; Best of 7 frames
(Australia) Neil Robertson (5)	4
(Northern Ireland) Joe Swail	2
(Hong Kong) Marco Fu (12)	4
(Finland) Robin Hull	0

Last 16; Best of 7 frames
(Australia) Neil Robertson (5)	3
(Hong Kong) Marco Fu (12)	4

==== Section 4 ====
Last 128; Best of 7 frames
(Republic of Ireland) Fergal O'Brien	4
(England) Brandon Sargeant	0
(China) Zhou Yuelong	0
(Scotland) Stephen Maguire	4
(England) Michael Holt	4
(England) David Grace	3
(Wales) Mark Williams (13)	4
(England) Rod Lawler	0
(England) Rory McLeod	0
(England) Mark Davis	4
(Wales) Jak Jones	0
(Scotland) Graeme Dott	4
(China) Wang Yuchen	1
(China) Xiao Guodong	4
(England) Shaun Murphy (4)	4
(China) Zhao Xintong	2

Last 64; Best of 7 frames
(Republic of Ireland) Fergal O'Brien	2
(Scotland) Stephen Maguire	4
(England) Michael Holt	1
(Wales) Mark Williams (13)	4
(England) Mark Davis	4
(Scotland) Graeme Dott	0
(China) Xiao Guodong	4
(England) Shaun Murphy (4)	1

Last 32; Best of 7 frames
(Scotland) Stephen Maguire	3
(Wales) Mark Williams (13)	4
(England) Mark Davis	4
(China) Xiao Guodong	1

Last 16; Best of 7 frames
(Wales) Mark Williams (13)	3
(England) Mark Davis	4

=== Bottom half ===
==== Section 5 ====
Last 128; Best of 7 frames
(England) Judd Trump (3)	4
(China) Zhang Yong	0
(England) Jimmy Robertson	3
(Brazil) Igor Figueiredo	4
(England) Craig Steadman	3
(Thailand) Noppon Saengkham	4
(China) Yan Bingtao	1
(India) Aditya Mehta	4
(England) Kyren Wilson (14)	4
(Wales) Jamie Jones	0
(England) Ben Woollaston	4
(Scotland) Ross Vallance	1
(Scotland) Rhys Clark	4
(Scotland) Eden Sharav	3
(England) Oliver Lines	4
(China) Chen Zhe	2

Last 64; Best of 7 frames
(England) Judd Trump (3)	4
(Brazil) Igor Figueiredo	0
(Thailand) Noppon Saengkham	4
(India) Aditya Mehta	2
(England) Kyren Wilson (14)	4
(England) Ben Woollaston	0
(Scotland) Rhys Clark	3
(England) Oliver Lines	4

Last 32; Best of 7 frames
(England) Judd Trump (3)	4
(Thailand) Noppon Saengkham	0
(England) Kyren Wilson (14)	4
(England) Oliver Lines	0

Last 16; Best of 7 frames
(England) Judd Trump (3)	4
(England) Kyren Wilson (14)	2

==== Section 6 ====
Last 128; Best of 7 frames
(Scotland) Fraser Patrick	3
(England) Anthony Hamilton	4
(Cyprus) Michael Georgiou	4
(England) Peter Lines	1
(England) Nigel Bond	0
(England) Chris Wakelin	4
(England) Ali Carter (11)	4
(Thailand) Thepchaiya Un-Nooh	2
(England) Michael Wild	3
(Wales) Ian Preece	4
(England) Robert Milkins	4
(England) David Gilbert	0
(England) Jack Lisowski	1
(Iran) Hossein Vafaei	4
(England) Joe Perry (6)	4
(England) Adam Duffy	3

Last 64; Best of 7 frames
(England) Anthony Hamilton	4
(Cyprus) Michael Georgiou	2
(England) Chris Wakelin	4
(England) Ali Carter (11)	3
(Wales) Ian Preece	0
(England) Robert Milkins	4
(Iran) Hossein Vafaei	0
(England) Joe Perry (6)	4

Last 32; Best of 7 frames
(England) Anthony Hamilton	4
(England) Chris Wakelin	0
(England) Robert Milkins	4
(England) Joe Perry (6)	1

Last 16; Best of 7 frames
(England) Anthony Hamilton	3
(England) Robert Milkins	4

==== Section 7 ====
Last 128; Best of 7 frames
(Northern Ireland) Mark Allen (7)	4
(England) Christopher Keogan	3
(China) Fang Xiongman	4
(England) Martin O'Donnell	2
(Thailand) Sunny Akani	4
(England) Andrew Higginson	3
(Thailand) James Wattana	1
(China) Li Hang	4
(England) Ronnie O'Sullivan (10)	4
(England) Matthew Selt	2
(England) James Cahill	3
(Poland) Adam Stefanow	4
(Wales) Ryan Day	4
(England) Elliot Slessor	1
(England) Jimmy White	4
(Wales) David John	0

Last 64; Best of 7 frames
(Northern Ireland) Mark Allen (7)	4
(China) Fang Xiongman	0
(Thailand) Sunny Akani	1
(China) Li Hang	4
(England) Ronnie O'Sullivan (10)	4
(Poland) Adam Stefanow	1
(Wales) Ryan Day	0
(England) Jimmy White	4

Last 32; Best of 7 frames
(Northern Ireland) Mark Allen (7)	4
(China) Li Hang	3
(England) Ronnie O'Sullivan (10)	4
(England) Jimmy White	2

Last 16; Best of 7 frames
(Northern Ireland) Mark Allen (7)	2
(England) Ronnie O'Sullivan (10)	4

==== Section 8 ====
Last 128; Best of 7 frames
(Wales) Dominic Dale	4
(Scotland) Chris Totten	2
(Belgium) Luca Brecel	2
(Wales) Duane Jones	4
(England) Daniel Womersley	2
(Malta) Alex Borg	4
(England) Ricky Walden (15)	4
(China) Tian Pengfei	1
(England) Paul Davison	0
(China) Mei Xiwen	4
(England) Jamie Cope	1
(England) Peter Ebdon	4
(Brazil) Itaro Santos	0
(Scotland) Scott Donaldson	4
(Scotland) John Higgins (2)	4
(Scotland) Alan McManus	1

Last 64; Best of 7 frames
(Wales) Dominic Dale	4
(Wales) Duane Jones	0
(Malta) Alex Borg	3
(England) Ricky Walden (15)	4
(China) Mei Xiwen	4
(England) Peter Ebdon	2
(Scotland) Scott Donaldson	0
(Scotland) John Higgins (2)	4

Last 32; Best of 7 frames
(Wales) Dominic Dale	4
(England) Ricky Walden (15)	3
(China) Mei Xiwen	0
(Scotland) John Higgins (2)	4

Last 16; Best of 7 frames
(Wales) Dominic Dale	0
(Scotland) John Higgins (2)	4

=== Finals ===
Quarter-finals; Best of 9 frames
(China) Yu Delu	5
(China) Liang Wenbo (9)	4
(Hong Kong) Marco Fu (12)	5
(England) Mark Davis	1
(England) Judd Trump (3)	5
(England) Robert Milkins	3
(England) Ronnie O'Sullivan (10)	2
(Scotland) John Higgins (2)	5

Semi-finals; Best of 11 frames
(China) Yu Delu	1
(Hong Kong) Marco Fu (12)	6
(England) Judd Trump (3)	5
(Scotland) John Higgins (2)	6

Final; Best of 17 frames
(Hong Kong) Marco Fu (12)	9
(Scotland) John Higgins (2)	4

== Final ==
Final: Best of 17 frames. Referee: Leo Scullion. Commonwealth Arena, Glasgow, Scotland, 18 December 2016.
Marco Fu (12); Hong Kong	9–4	John Higgins (2); Scotland
Afternoon: 0–126 (126), 25–102 (101), 0–100 (100), 106–1 (106), 0–78 (78), 101–28, 94–36 (58), 78–32 (54); Evening: 62–35, 89–0 (89), 66–57 (59), 84–24 (59), 68–34 (60)
106	Highest break	126
1	Century breaks	3
7	50+ breaks	4

== Century breaks ==
- 142, 141, 135, 132, 130, 127, 113, 110, 106, 104, 100 – Marco Fu
- 139, 110 – Mark Williams
- 135, 107, 104 – Neil Robertson
- 134 – Mike Dunn
- 134 – Sean O'Sullivan
- 133 – Jimmy White
- 132, 129 – Xiao Guodong
- 132, 126, 113, 112, 100 – Judd Trump
- 132, 112 – Michael White
- 130 – Stephen Maguire
- 126, 111 – Anthony Hamilton
- 126, 110, 104, 101, 101, 100 – John Higgins
- 126 – Stuart Carrington
- 124, 114, 104, 103 – Ronnie O'Sullivan
- 121 – Tom Ford
- 120 – Andrew Higginson
- 117 – Robin Hull
- 116, 101 – Stuart Bingham
- 115 – Lee Walker
- 115 – Liang Wenbo
- 114, 109 – Mark Davis
- 114 – Fergal O'Brien
- 110 – Ryan Day
- 108 – Hossein Vafaei
- 106 – Joe Perry
- 106 – Robert Milkins
- 105 – Ricky Walden
- 104 – Chris Wakelin
- 103 – Yu Delu
- 102 – Gary Wilson
- 102 – Mark Allen
- 101, 100 – Barry Hawkins
- 101 – Kyren Wilson
- 100, 100 – Shaun Murphy
