= 1984 World Amateur Snooker Championship =

Tournament information
- Dates: 17 October – 4 November 1984
- Venue: Grand Hotel
- City: Malahide, County Dublin
- Country: Ireland
- Organisation: International Billiards and Snooker Federation, Billiards and Snooker Control Council
- Format: Round-robin and knockout
- Highest break: Tony Drago (MLT), 132

Final
- Champion: Omprakesh Agrawal (IND)
- Runner-up: Terry Parsons (WAL)
- Score: 11–7

The 1984 World Amateur Snooker Championship was the eleventh edition of the tournament also known as the IBSF World Snooker Championship. The tournament was played at the Grand Hotel in Malahide, County Dublin, Ireland from 17 October to 4 November 1984. Omprakesh Agrawal defeated defending champion Terry Parsons 11–7 in the final to win the title.

== Tournament summary ==
The first World Amateur Snooker Championship was held in 1963, and, after the second event in 1966, had been played every two years since. The 1984 tournament was held in Dublin from 17 October to 4 November 1984 at the Grand Hotel in Malahide, County Dublin. The tournament became an annual event from 1985.

For 1984, there were 41 competitors, from 22 different countries, who played in Round-robin groups. The top two players from each group qualified for the quarter-finals. Defending champion Terry Parsons was the top seed, with Tony Drago second. The tournament was sponsored by Benson and Hedges, and was also known as the Benson and Hedges World Amateur Championship. In the first frame of his qualifying group match against Henry Thwaites, 15-year-old Stephen Hendry scored a break of 118. Alain Robidoux narrowly failed to qualify from qualifying group B. He had the same number of matches won as second-placed Tony Drago, but a worse difference between frames won and lost.

In the final, Agrawal faced Parson. They players were level at 7–7 after four sessions, before Agrawal won four successive frames to secure victory at 11–7. He was the first player not from either England or Wales to win the title.

The highest break of the competition was 132, a new championship record, compiled by Drago against Christian D'Avoine.

The International Billiards and Snooker Federation (IBSF) had been running the World Amateur Snooker Championship since 1972. On 31 October 1984, the IBSF's annual general meeting voted to change its constitution, state that it was the governing body of international amateur snooker in "co-operation with" the Billiards and Snooker Control Council (B&SCC). At this time, the B&SCC's constitution proclaimed itself as the governing body for amateur snooker.

== Main draw ==
Players in bold denote match winners.

**Quarter-finals**; Best of 9 frames
**Omprakesh Agrawal (IND)**	**5**
Dilwyn John (WAL)	4
**Jon Wright (ENG)**	**5**
Alf Micallef (MLT)	1
**Chris Archer (ENG)**	**5**
Tony Drago (MLT)	4
**Terry Parsons (WAL)**	**5**
Glen Wilkinson (AUS)	2

**Semi-finals**; Best of 15 frames
**Omprakesh Agrawal (IND)**	**8**
Jon Wright (ENG)	'5
Chris Archer (ENG)	3
**Terry Parsons (WAL)**	**8**

**Final**; Best of 21 frames
**Omprakesh Agrawal (IND)**	**11**
Terry Parsons (WAL)	7
