= Welsh Amateur Championship (snooker) =

Tournament information
- Country: Wales
- Established: 1928; 98 years ago
- Organisation(s): Welsh Billiards & Snooker Association
- Format: Amateur event
- Recent edition: 2026
- Current champion: (Wales) Darren Morgan

The Welsh Amateur Championship is an annual snooker competition played in Wales and is the highest ranking and most prestigious amateur event in Wales.

The competition was first established back in 1928 which was won by J. Emrys Harries. The championship is currently held by Alfie Davies who defeated David John in 2025 by 8 frames to 1. Final was played at Penygraig Labour Club. Tom Jones is the most successful player in the tournaments history winning the championship 8 times over a 17-year period.

Currently former champions Jackson Page, Ryan Day, Daniel Wells, Jamie Jones, Dylan Emery and Jamie Clarke are all playing on the world tour.

== Winners ==
Year	Winner	Runner-up	Final score
1928	(Wales) J. Emrys Harries	(Wales) T. Atkins	4–0
1929	(Wales) C. Curtis	(Wales) H. Martin	5–2
1930	(Wales) Tom Jones	Unknown	Unknown
1931	(Wales) Tom Jones	(Wales) A. Withers	4–1
1932	(Wales) Tom Jones	(Wales) Brin Gravenor	4–1
1933	(Wales) Tom Jones	(Wales) Brin Gravenor	4–2
1934	(Wales) Tom Jones	(Wales) Brin Gravenor	4–3
1935	(Wales) Tom Jones	(Wales) Gwyn Howells	4–3
1936	(Wales) C. Jenners	(Wales) Gwyn Howells	4–1
1937	(Wales) Gwyn Howells	(Wales) R. James	4–2
1938	(Wales) Brin Gravenor	(Wales) Tom Jones	4–0
1939	(Wales) Willie E. James	(Wales) W. Eastabrook	4–0
1940–1945 No competition due to World War II
1946	(Wales) Brin Gravenor	(Wales) W. V. Hayes	4–1
1947	(Wales) Tom Jones	(Wales) Richie Smith	Unknown
1948	(Wales) Richie Smith	(Wales) John Ford	5–3
1949	(Wales) John Ford	(Wales) C. Coles	Unknown
1950	(Wales) Ray Reardon	(Wales) John Ford	5–3
1951	(Wales) Ray Reardon	(Wales) Richie Smith	5–2
1952	(Wales) Ray Reardon	(Wales) John Ford	5–3
1953	(Wales) Ray Reardon	(Wales) Aubrey Kemp	5–3
1954	(Wales) Ray Reardon	(Wales) John Ford	Unknown
1955	(Wales) Ray Reardon	(Wales) John Ford	5–2
1956	(Wales) Cliff Wilson	(Wales) V. Wilkins	Unknown
1957	(Wales) Des Meredith	(Wales) Noel Williams	5–0
1958	(Wales) Aubrey Kemp	(Wales) Des Meredith	Unknown
1959	(Wales) John R. Price	(Wales) Mario Berni	Unknown
1960	(Wales) Len Luker	(Wales) Aubrey Kemp	Unknown
1961	(Wales) Terry Parsons	(Wales) John R. Price	6–2
1962	(Wales) John Ford	(Wales) Mario Berni	Unknown
1953	(Wales) Des Meredith	(Wales) John Ford	Unknown
1964	(Wales) Mario Berni	(Wales) John Ford	Unknown
1965	(Wales) Terry Parsons	(Wales) John Ford	6–2
1966	(Wales) Lynn L. O'Neill	(Wales) Doug Mountjoy	Unknown
1967	(Wales) Lynn L. O'Neill	(Wales) Ken Weed	Unknown
1968	(Wales) Doug Mountjoy	(Wales) John Terry	6–5
1969	(Wales) Terry Parsons	(Wales) John Prosser	6–1
1970	(Wales) Des May	(Wales) Geoff Thomas	Unknown
1971	(Wales) Des May	(Wales) Roy Oriel	6–4
1972	(Wales) Geoff Thomas	(Wales) Terry Griffiths	6–2
1973	(Wales) Alwyn Lloyd	(Wales) Geoff Thomas	8–6
1974	(Wales) Alwyn Lloyd	(Wales) Geoff Thomas	8–5
1975	(Wales) Terry Griffiths	(Wales) Geoff Thomas	8–7
1976	(Wales) Doug Mountjoy	(Wales) Alwyn Lloyd	8–6
1977	(Wales) Cliff Wilson	(Wales) Dai Thomas	8–1
1978	(Wales) Alwyn Lloyd	(Wales) Steve Newbury	8–4
1979	(Wales) Cliff Wilson	(Wales) Geoff Thomas	8–5
1980	(Wales) Steve Newbury	(Wales) Alwyn Lloyd	8–6
1981	(Wales) Colin Roscoe	(Wales) Elwyn Richards	9–5
1982	(Wales) Terry Parsons	(Wales) Mario Berni	9–7
1983	(Wales) Wayne Jones	(Wales) Terry Parsons	8–4
1984	(Wales) Terry Parsons	(Wales) Wayne Jones	8–7
1985	(Wales) Mark Bennett	(Wales) Dilwyn John	8–7
1986	(Wales) Kerry Jones	(Wales) John Griffiths	8–2
1987	(Wales) Darren Morgan	(Wales) John Herbert	8–4
1988	(Wales) Paul Dawkins	(Wales) Ron Jones	8–3
1989	(Wales) Paul Dawkins	(Wales) Nick Jones	8–3
1990	(Wales) Ron Jones	(Wales) Rob Harrhy	8–3
1991	(Wales) Dominic Dale	(Wales) David Bell	8–7
1992	(Wales) Ron Jones	(Wales) John Mills	8–6
1993	(Wales) Andrew Peters	(Wales) David Bell	8–5
1994	(Wales) Elfed Evans	(Wales) Ron Jones	8–4
1995	(Wales) John Payne	(Wales) Tim English	8–7
1996	(Wales) David Bell	(Wales) Ron Jones	8–5
1997	(Wales) Milton Davies	(Wales) Matthew Farrant	7–5
1998	(Wales) Ryan Day	(Wales) Ron Jones	8–4
1999	(Wales) Ian Preece	(Wales) Milton Davies	8–7
2000	(Wales) David Mills	(Wales) Tim English	8–7
2001	(Wales) David Mills	(Wales) David John	9–7
2002	(Wales) Tim English	(Wales) Elfed Evans	9–7
2003	(Wales) Elfed Evans	(Wales) Gavin Lewis	7–2
2004	(Wales) Tim English	(Wales) Gavin Pantall	7–4
2005	(Wales) Andrew Pagett	(Wales) Michael White	6–4
2006	(Wales) Jamie Jones	(Wales) Philip Williams	9–8
2007	(Wales) Philip Williams	(Wales) Anthony Davies	8–3
2008	(Wales) Jamie Jones	(Wales) David Donovan	8–2
2009	(Wales) Michael White	(Wales) Darren Morgan	8–2
2010	(Wales) Andrew Pagett	(Wales) Gareth Allen	8–0
2011	(Wales) Daniel Wells	(Wales) David John	8–4
2012	(Wales) Duane Jones	(Wales) Elfed Evans	8–4
2013	(Wales) David John	(Wales) Alex Taubman	8–4
2014	(Wales) Jamie Clarke	(Wales) Lee Walker	8–6
2015	(Wales) Darren Morgan	(Wales) Daniel Wells	8–0
2016	(Wales) David John	(Wales) Darren Morgan	8–7
2017	(Wales) Rhydian Richards	(Wales) Darren Morgan	8–4
2018	(Wales) Jackson Page	(Wales) Ian Sargeant	8–1
2019	(Wales) Darren Morgan	(Wales) Gavin Lewis	8–2
2021	(Wales) Dylan Emery	(Wales) Paul Davies	8–6
2022	(Wales) Darren Morgan	(Wales) Liam Davies	8–2
2023	(Wales) Elfed Evans	(Wales) Alfie Davies	8–4
2024	(Wales) Alex Taubman	(Wales) Alfie Davies	8–6
2025	(Wales) Alfie Davies	(Wales) David John	8-1
2026	(Wales) Darren Morgan	(Wales) Riley Powell	8-4

== Stats ==
=== Finalists ===
Rank	Name	Winner	Runner-up	Total
1	Tom Jones	7	1	9
2	Ray Reardon	6	0	6
3	Darren Morgan	5	3	8
4	Terry Parsons	5	1	6
5	Alwyn Lloyd	3	2	5
5	Elfed Evans	3	2	5
7	Cliff Wilson	3	0	3
8	John Ford	2	8	10
9	Ron Jones	2	4	6
10	Brin Gravenor	2	3	5
11	David John	2	3	5
12	Tim English	2	2	4
13	Des Meredith	2	1	3
13	Doug Mountjoy	2	1	3
15	Jamie Jones	2	0	2
15	David Mills	2	0	2
15	Des May	2	0	2
15	Paul Dawkins	2	0	2
15	Lynn L. O'Neill	2	0	2
15	Andrew Pagett	2	0	2
21	Geoff Thomas	1	5	6
22	Mario Berni	1	3	4
23	David Bell	1	2	3
23	Richie Smith	1	2	3
23	Aubrey Kemp	1	2	3
23	Alfie Davies	1	2	3
23	Gwyn Howells	1	2	3
28	Daniel Wells	1	1	2
28	Terry Griffiths	1	1	2
28	Milton Davies	1	1	2
28	Steve Newbury	1	1	2
28	John R. Price	1	1	2
28	Wayne Jones	1	1	2
28	Philip Williams	1	1	2
28	Alex Taubman	1	1	2
28	Michael White	1	1	2
36	Ryan Day	1	0	1
36	Len Luker	1	0	1
36	C. Jenners	1	0	1
36	J. Emrys Harries	1	0	1
36	John Payne	1	0	1
36	Jamie Clarke	1	0	1
36	C. Curtis	1	0	1
36	Kerry Jones	1	0	1
36	Ian Preece	1	0	1
36	Mark Bennett	1	0	1
36	Andrew Peters	1	0	1
36	Duane Jones	1	0	1
36	Dominic Dale	1	0	1
36	Willie E. James	1	0	1
36	Colin Roscoe	1	0	1
36	Rhydian Richards	1	0	1
36	Dylan Emery	1	0	1
53	Gavin Lewis	0	2	2
55	V. Wilkins	0	1	1
55	Lee Walker	0	1	1
55	David Donovan	0	1	1
55	H. Martin	0	1	1
55	Rob Harrhy	0	1	1
55	John Mills	0	1	1
55	R. James	0	1	1
55	T. Atkins	0	1	1
55	A. Withers	0	1	1
55	W. Eastabrook	0	1	1
55	Matthew Farrant	0	1	1
55	W. V. Hayes	0	1	1
55	C. Coles	0	1	1
55	John Prosser	0	1	1
55	Noel Williams	0	1	1
55	John Terry	0	1	1
55	Elwyn Richards	0	1	1
55	Dai Thomas	0	1	1
55	Ken Weed	0	1	1
55	John Herbert	0	1	1
55	Roy Oriel	0	1	1
55	John Griffiths	0	1	1
55	Nick Jones	0	1	1
55	Dilwyn John	0	1	1
55	Gareth Allen	0	1	1
55	Gavin Pantall	0	1	1
55	Ian Sargeant	0	1	1
55	Anthony Davies	0	1	1
55	Paul Davies	0	1	1
55	Liam Davies	0	1	1
