= David John (snooker player) =

Welsh snooker player (born 1984)

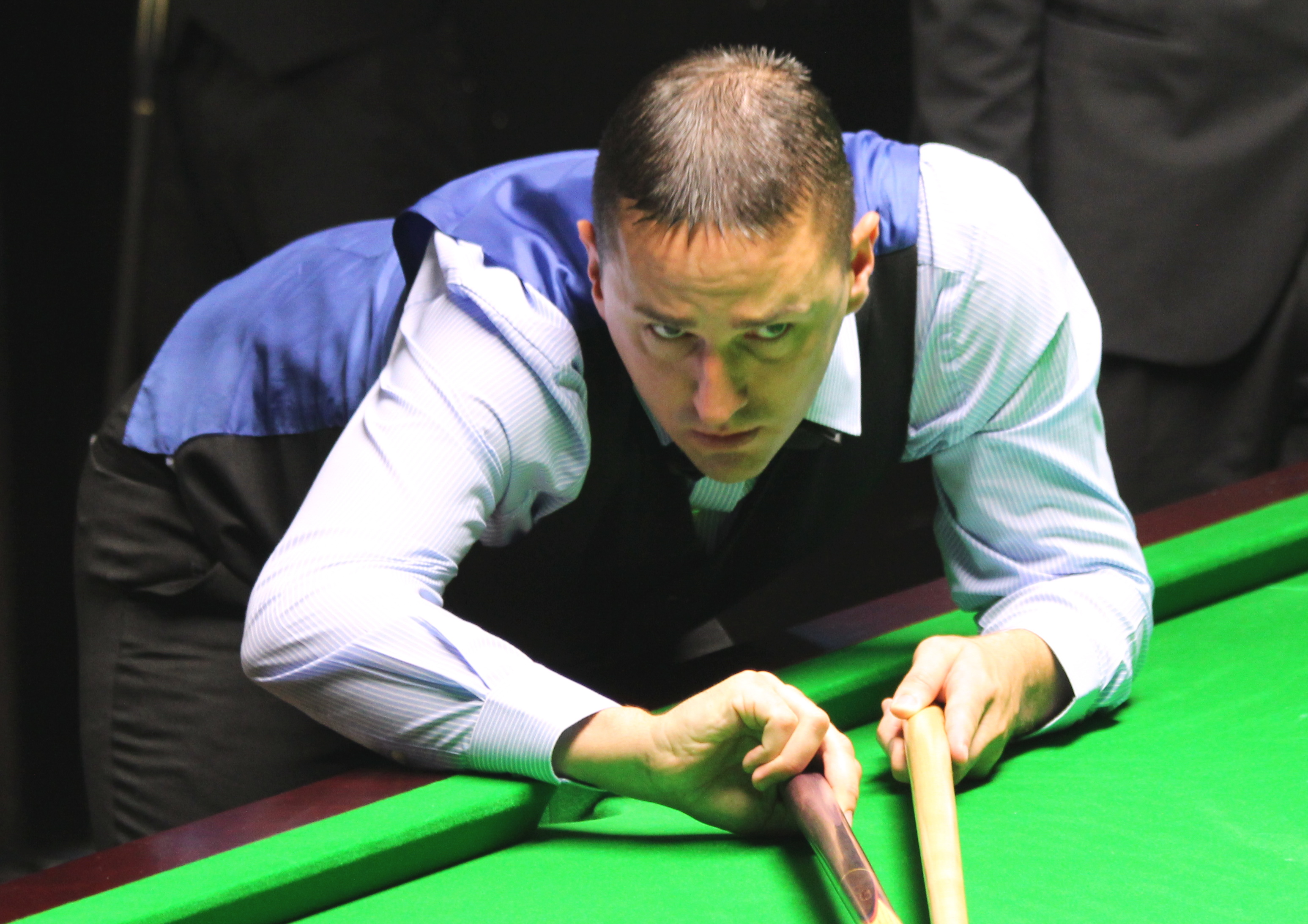
- Paul Hunter Classic 2016

Personal information
- Born: 24 November 1984 (age 41) Bridgend, Glamorgan

Sport
- Country: Wales
- Sport: Snooker
- Professional: 2002/2003, 2016–2018
- Highest ranking: 75(June 2017)

David "Dai" John (born 24 November 1984 in Bridgend, Glamorgan) is a Welsh former professional snooker player. John was banned from snooker until 21 December 2023 after being found guilty of match fixing by the WPBSA in February 2019.

== Career ==
=== Early years ===
John drew attention in 2000 by reaching the quarter-finals at the European Under-19 Championship. His first major success occurred in 2002 when he won the EBSA European Championship after defeating David McLellan 7–2, he continued this success at amateur level for the remainder of the year and reached the final of the IBSF World Under-21 Snooker Championship lost but 9–11 against China's Ding Junhui.

For the 2002–03 snooker season John joined the main tour. In the first world ranking tournament of the season, the 2002 LG Cup, John secured a 5–3 win against Andrew Higginson before being eliminated in the following round by Martin Dziewialtowski. After this John struggled for much of the season with his best performance of the season came in the 2003 Welsh Open where John reached the third qualifying round before losing 4–5 to future World Champion Mark Selby in a final frame decider. John finished the season ranked 111th .

In June 2003, John defeated fellow countryman Andrew Pagett 7–3 to retain the EBSA European Championship, becoming the first person to do so. As of 2022, John, Robin Hull and Maltese player Alex Borg are the only players to have won the EBSA European Championship consecutively.

=== Amateur years ===
“I should’ve knuckled down for three or four years. I thought I could do both, get up at 5, get back at 2, but you can’t do both. That’s when my snooker started going downhill. I know the ability is still there, it’s just the practice.”

— David John

Having dropped off of the tour at the end of the 2002–03 snooker season John spent the next 13 years playing as an amateur. During this time he twice won the Welsh Amateur Championship.

In June 2015, John entered Australian Goldfields Open, defeating world number 44 Alfie Burden in the first qualifying round 5–1. Although he was ultimately defeated by Peter Lines by the same score in the following round, this performance encouraged John that he could still make a full-time return to the game at a professional level.

=== Return to professional status ===
After a 13-year absence John earned a place on the main tour by coming through the 2016 Q School. He beat Zak Surety 4–1 in the final round of the second event to secure a two-year tour card.

== Performance and rankings timeline ==
Tournament	2001/ 02	2002/ 03	2003/ 04	2004/ 05	2015/ 16	2016/ 17	2017/ 18
Ranking (Note: From the 2010/2011 season it shows the ranking at the beginning of the season.)	(Note: He was an amateur.)	(Note: New players on the Main Tour do not have a ranking.)					95
Ranking tournaments
Riga Masters (Note: The event was called the Riga Open (2015/2016))	Tournament Not Held				MR	WD	LQ
China Championship	Tournament Not Held					NR	LQ
Paul Hunter Classic	Tournament Not Held				MR	1R	1R
Indian Open	Tournament Not Held				NH	LQ	LQ
World Open (Note: The event was called the LG Cup (2002/2003))	A	LQ	A	A	NH	LQ	LQ
European Masters	A	LQ	A	A	NH	LQ	LQ
English Open	Tournament Not Held					1R	A
International Championship	Tournament Not Held				A	LQ	A
Shanghai Masters	Tournament Not Held				A	LQ	A
Northern Ireland Open	Tournament Not Held					1R	A
UK Championship	A	LQ	A	A	A	1R	A
Scottish Open	A	LQ	A	Not Held		1R	A
German Masters	Tournament Not Held				A	LQ	A
Shoot-Out	Tournament Not Held				VF	2R	1R
World Grand Prix	Tournament Not Held				NR	DNQ	DNQ
Welsh Open	A	LQ	A	A	A	1R	1R
Gibraltar Open	Tournament Not Held				MR	2R	A
Players Championship (Note: The event was called the Players Championship Grand Final (2015/2016))	Tournament Not Held				DNQ	DNQ	DNQ
China Open	A	Not Held		A	A	LQ	LQ
World Championship	LQ	LQ	LQ	LQ	A	LQ	LQ
Non-ranking tournaments
The Masters	A	LQ	A	A	A	A	A
Former ranking tournaments
British Open	A	LQ	A	A	Not Held		
Irish Masters	A	LQ	A	A	Not Held		
Australian Goldfields Open	Tournament Not Held				LQ	Not Held	

Performance Table Legend
LQ	lost in the qualifying draw	#R	lost in the early rounds of the tournament (WR = Wildcard round, RR = Round robin)	QF	lost in the quarter-finals
SF	lost in the semi-finals	F	lost in the final	W	won the tournament
DNQ	did not qualify for the tournament	A	did not participate in the tournament	WD	withdrew from the tournament

NH / Not Held	means an event was not held.
NR / Non-Ranking Event	means an event is/was no longer a ranking event.
R / Ranking Event	means an event is/was a ranking event.
MR / Minor-Ranking Event	means an event is/was a minor-ranking event.
PA / Pro-am Event	means an event is/was a pro-am event.

== Career finals ==
=== Amateur finals: 8 (4 titles) ===
Outcome	No.	Year	Championship	Opponent in the final	Score
Runner-up	1.	2001	Welsh Amateur Championship	(Wales) David Mills	9–7
Winner	1.	2002	EBSA European Snooker Championship	(Scotland) David McLellan	7–2
Runner-up	2.	2002	IBSF World Under-21 Championship	(China) Ding Junhui	9–11
Winner	2.	2003	EBSA European Snooker Championship (2)	(Wales) Andrew Pagett	7–3
Runner-up	3.	2011	Welsh Amateur Championship (2)	(Wales) Daniel Wells	4–8
Winner	3.	2013	Welsh Amateur Championship	(Wales) Alex Taubman	8–4
Winner	4.	2016	Welsh Amateur Championship (2)	(Wales) Darren Morgan	8–7
Runner-up	4.	2025	Welsh Amateur Championship (3)	(Wales) Alfie Davies	1–8
