= Gareth Allen =

Welsh snooker player (born 1988)

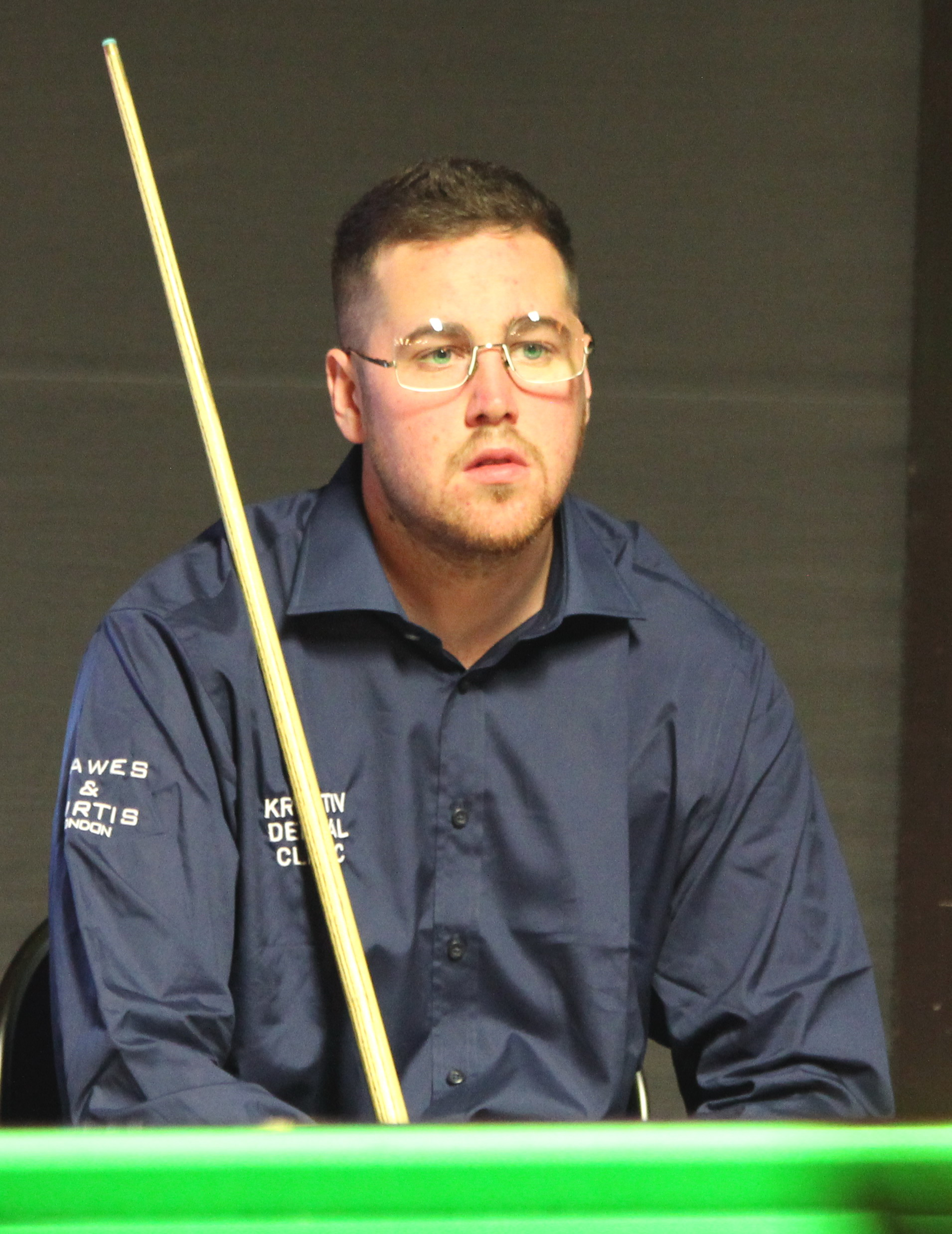
- Paul Hunter Classic 2015

Personal information
- Nickname: G-force
- Born: 9 September 1988 (age 38) Mynydd Isa, Flintshire

Sport
- Country: Wales
- Sport: Snooker
- Professional: 2015–2017
- Highest ranking: 86 (June 2016)

Gareth Allen (born 9 September 1988 in Mynydd Isa, near Buckley, Flintshire) is a Welsh former professional snooker player.

== Career ==
Allen started playing snooker aged three, joining his local snooker club and playing on full sized table at twelve. In a lengthy amateur career, Allen made his debut for the Welsh international side aged eighteen, where he reached the last 16 of the 2010 Amateur World Snooker Championship and narrowly missed out on a professional tour card in 2013, where he lost in the final to Robin Hull in the EBSA European Snooker Championships. He was also a regular competitor in Players Tour Championship events, where in the professional rounds he beat pros such as Kurt Maflin, Alfie Burden, Andrew Norman, Joel Walker and Nigel Bond.

He was also a regular competitor in the end of season Q School events since their introduction and in 2012 he lost in a quarter-final match against Paul Davison, which would have gained him pro tour status had he won. However, his run did enable him to feature in several ranking events during the 2012–13 season, with the highlight being a win over then top 32 player Rory McLeod 4–2 in qualifying in his home event the 2013 Welsh Open. His next match against John Higgins was televised, which he lost 4–1.

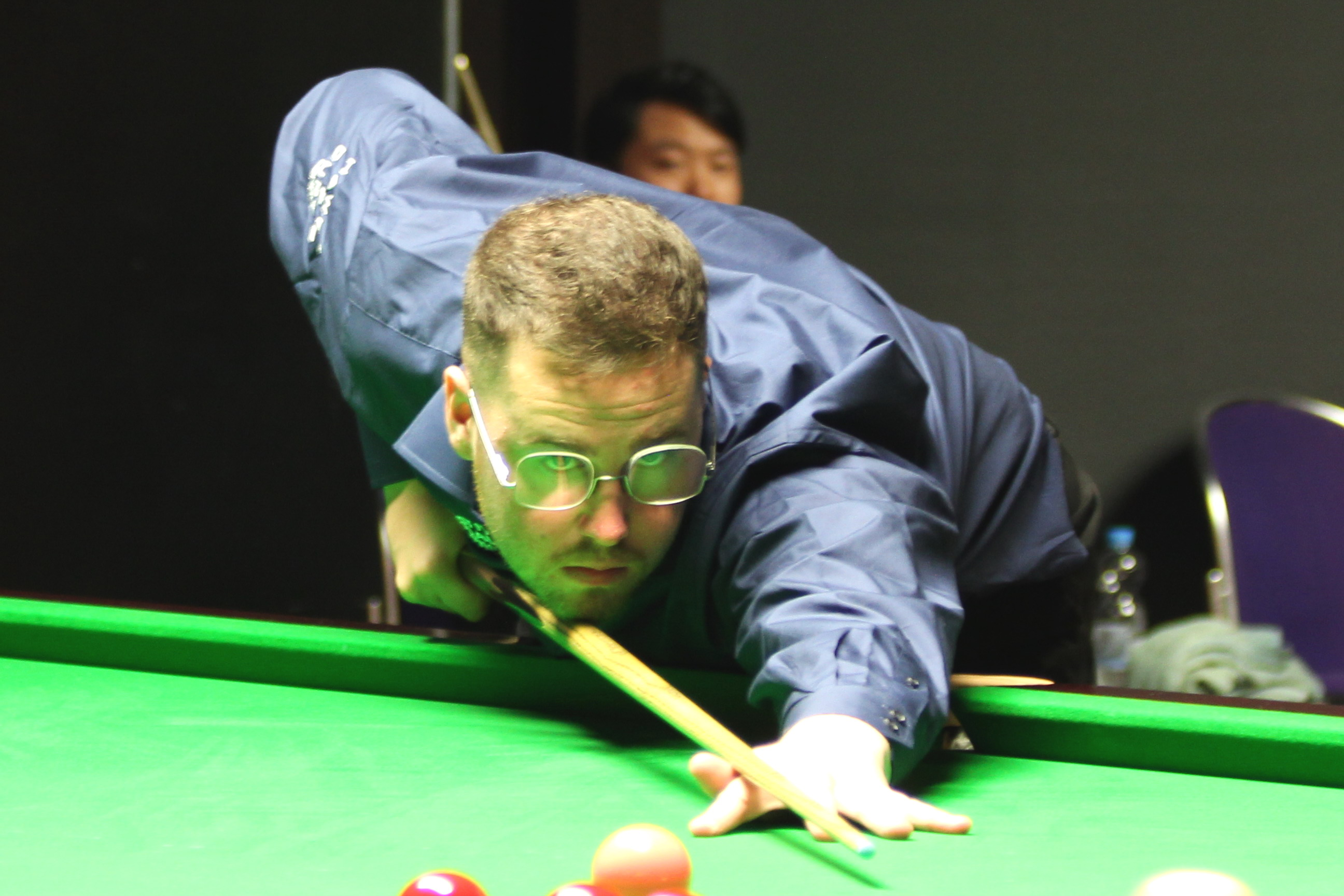
2015 Paul Hunter Classic

Allen was successful in the 2015 Q School and earned a tour card for the 2015–16 and 2016–17 seasons by beating Alex Taubman 4–2 in his final match of the second event. He won his first match as a professional by beating Adam Edge 5–3 in Australian Goldfields Open qualifying, but lost 5–1 to Jamie Burnett in the second round. Allen saw off Barry Pinches and Aditya Mehta both 5–1 in the qualifying rounds for the Shanghai Masters, before losing by a reversal of this scoreline to Li Hang. He made his debut at the venue stage of a ranking event in York for the UK Championship and was defeated 6–1 by Liang Wenbo. Allen then lost 15 successive matches from August 2015 until the start of the 2016–17 season, when he beat Kurt Maflin 4–3 to qualify for the Riga Masters. Allen won a match at the venue stage of a ranking event for the first time by edging past Ross Muir 4–3 in the opening round of the Scottish Open and then lost 4–3 to Mike Dunn. A 5–4 win over Robin Hull saw him qualify for the China Open, where he was beaten 5–0 by Ronnie O'Sullivan in the second round. Allen fell off the tour at the end of the season as he was placed 110th in the world rankings. Following his relegation from the tour, Allen announced his retirement from the game and started coaching after gaining his coaching qualification through the WPBSA.

== Performance and rankings timeline ==
Tournament	2010/ 11	2011/ 12	2012/ 13	2013/ 14	2014/ 15	2015/ 16	2016/ 17
Ranking (Note: It shows the ranking at the beginning of the season.)	(Note: He was an amateur.)					(Note: New players on the Main Tour don't have a ranking.)	112
Ranking tournaments
Riga Masters (Note: The event was called the Riga Open (2014/2015–2015/2016))	Tournament Not Held				Minor-Rank.		1R
Indian Open	Not Held			A	A	NH	LQ
World Open	A	A	LQ	A	Not Held		LQ
Paul Hunter Classic	Minor-Ranking Event						1R
Shanghai Masters	A	A	LQ	A	A	LQ	LQ
European Masters	Tournament Not Held						LQ
English Open	Tournament Not Held						1R
International Championship	Not Held		LQ	A	A	LQ	LQ
Northern Ireland Open	Tournament Not Held						1R
UK Championship	A	A	LQ	A	A	1R	1R
Scottish Open	Not Held		MR	Tournament Not Held			2R
German Masters	A	A	A	A	A	LQ	LQ
World Grand Prix	Tournament Not Held				NR	DNQ	DNQ
Welsh Open	A	A	LQ	A	A	1R	1R
Gibraltar Open	Tournament Not Held					MR	1R
Players Championship (Note: The event was called the Players Tour Championship Grand Finals (2010/2011–2015/2016))	DNQ	DNQ	DNQ	DNQ	DNQ	DNQ	DNQ
China Open	A	A	LQ	A	A	LQ	1R
World Championship	A	A	A	A	A	LQ	LQ
Non-ranking tournaments
Six-red World Championship (Note: The event was called the Six-red Snooker International (2008/2009))	A	NH	A	A	RR	A	A
Former ranking tournaments
Australian Goldfields Open	NH	A	A	A	A	LQ	NH

Performance Table Legend
LQ	lost in the qualifying draw	#R	lost in the early rounds of the tournament (WR = Wildcard round, RR = Round robin)	QF	lost in the quarter-finals
SF	lost in the semi-finals	F	lost in the final	W	won the tournament
DNQ	did not qualify for the tournament	A	did not participate in the tournament	WD	withdrew from the tournament

NH / Not Held	means an event was not held.
NR / Non-Ranking Event	means an event is/was no longer a ranking event.
R / Ranking Event	means an event is/was a ranking event.
MR / Minor-Ranking Event	means an event is/was a minor-ranking event.

== Career finals ==
=== Amateur finals: 2 ===
Outcome	No.	Year	Championship	Opponent in the final	Score
Runner-up	1.	2010	Welsh Amateur Championship	(Wales) Andrew Pagett	0–8
Runner-up	2.	2013	European Amateur Championships	(Finland) Robin Hull	2–7
