= IBSF World Championship =

IBSF World Championship may refer to:

- IBSF World Snooker Championship
- IBSF World Championships (bobsleigh and skeleton)
