= Terry Parsons =

Welsh snooker player

Personal information
- Born: 19 June 1935 Trealaw, Glamorgan, Wales
- Died: 8 May 1999 (aged 63) Pen-y-graig, Mid Glamorgan, Wales

Sport
- Country: Wales
- Sport: Snooker

Terence Parsons (19 June 1935 – 8 May 1999) was a Welsh amateur snooker player. He won five Welsh national snooker championship titles and an Amateur World Championship title during his professional career. He became a Welsh national champion in 1961, 1965, 1969, 1982 and 1984 and won the World Amateur Snooker Championship in 1982 at the age of 47.

== Career ==
Parsons won his maiden Welsh Amateur Snooker Championship title in 1961 with a comfortable 6–2 win over John Price in the final. He registered his second Welsh Amateur Snooker Championship title win in 1965 with a 6–2 win over Bob Berryman. In 1969, he won his third Welsh Snooker Championship title with a 6–1 victory over John Prosser.

After a gap of twelve years, he participated in the Welsh Amateur Snooker Championship in 1981 and reached the quarterfinals of the competition. However, he eventually lost to the tournament's finalist Elwyn Richards and was knocked out of the tournament. In the following year in 1982, he came back strong to clinch his fourth career Welsh Amateur Snooker Championship title after defeating Mario Berni 9–7 in the final.

Parsons also participated at the 1982 World Amateur Snooker Championship which was held in Calgary, Canada. In his maiden appearance at the World Amateur Championship, he reached his first ever Amateur World Championship final with seven wins and the only loss came against Paddy Browne of Ireland. He defeated Malcolm Bradley in the quarterfinals with a whitewash victory and registered a 8–5 victory over his Welsh compatriot Wayne Jones. He secured his maiden Amateur World Championship title by defeating Jim Bear of Canada with a 11–8 victory in the final despite Parsons trialling 7–1 in the opening session of the final. He also became the fourth Welsh snooker player to win Snooker World Championship after Gary Owen, Doug Mountjoy and Cliff Wilson. Parsons's world triumph outside Wales was considered as a great achievement since he had the prolonged issue of homesickness.

He suffered his first defeat in a Welsh Amateur Snooker Championship final (his fifth career Welsh Snooker Championship final) in 1983 losing to Wayne Jones 4–8. The following year, he defeated his arch-rival and 1983 winner Wayne Jones 8–7 in a close finish during the final of the 1984 Welsh Amateur Snooker Championship in a matter of 6 career finals.

He also took part at the 1984 World Amateur Snooker Championship which was held in Dublin, Ireland as a defending world champion. He reached the main round with eight wins and only two defeats from ten matches. He registered comfortable wins over Australia's Glen Wilkinson and England's Chris Archer in the quarterfinals and semifinals respectively to qualify for his second straight IBSF World Championship final. However, he couldn't retain his world championship title after losing to India's Omprakesh Agrawal 11–7 in the final.

He won the 1985 WPBSA Pro Ticket Series 87-88 professional tour qualifiers defeating Robert Marshall in the final. However, he lost to Harry Morgan in the round 1 of the 1986 WPBSA Pro Ticket Series 87-88 professional tour qualifiers. He was knocked out of last 16 of the 1985 Welsh Amateur Snooker Championship after losing to England's Bob Dorkins.

In addition, he also served as a postman in the Rhondda Valley sending mails. He spent most of his time at the Pen-y-graig Labour Club and played a pivotal role in steering the club to record seven CIU finals including four titles. Parsons alone bagged five individual prizes for his performance and his valiant effort of 138 remains as the jointly highest held break in the competition's history. In 1998, he won the Welsh National Over 40s snooker championship. He continued to excel in Welsh local amateur snooker events until his sixties.

He was known to have had a solid gameplan and solid allround game. However, he had not competed at the professional circuit due to his anxiety and homesick issues. He remained as an amateur player until the end of his career.

== Personal life ==
He was married and had two sons and a daughter. He was diagnosed with leukaemia in April 1999 and died on 8 May 1999 at the age of 63 in Pen-y-graig. He was diagnosed with leukaemia just around two weeks prior to his untimely demise and also underwent chemotherapy to treat the leukaemia. His condition however deteriorated after the chemotherapy.

== Legacy ==
A special snooker event was organised on 12 May 2007 in Pen-y-graig Labour Club in Wales in memory of Terry Parsons.

=== Amateur finals: 8 (6 titles) ===
Outcome	No.	Year	Championship	Opponent in the final/ Runner-up	Score
Winner	1.	1961	Welsh Amateur Championship	(Wales) John Price	6–2
Winner	2.	1965	Welsh Amateur Championship (2)	(Wales) Bob Berryman	6–2
Winner	3.	1969	Welsh Amateur Championship (3)	(Wales) John Prosser	6–1
Winner	4.	1982	Welsh Amateur Championship (4)	(Wales) Mario Berni	9–7
Winner	5.	1982	World Amateur Championship	(Canada) Jim Bear	11–8
Runner-up	1.	1983	Welsh Amateur Championship	(Wales) Wayne Jones	4–8
Winner	6.	1984	Welsh Amateur Championship (5)	(Wales) Wayne Jones	8–7
Runner-up	2.	1984	World Amateur Championship	(India) Omprakesh Agrawal	11–7
