= Sydney Wilson =

English snooker player

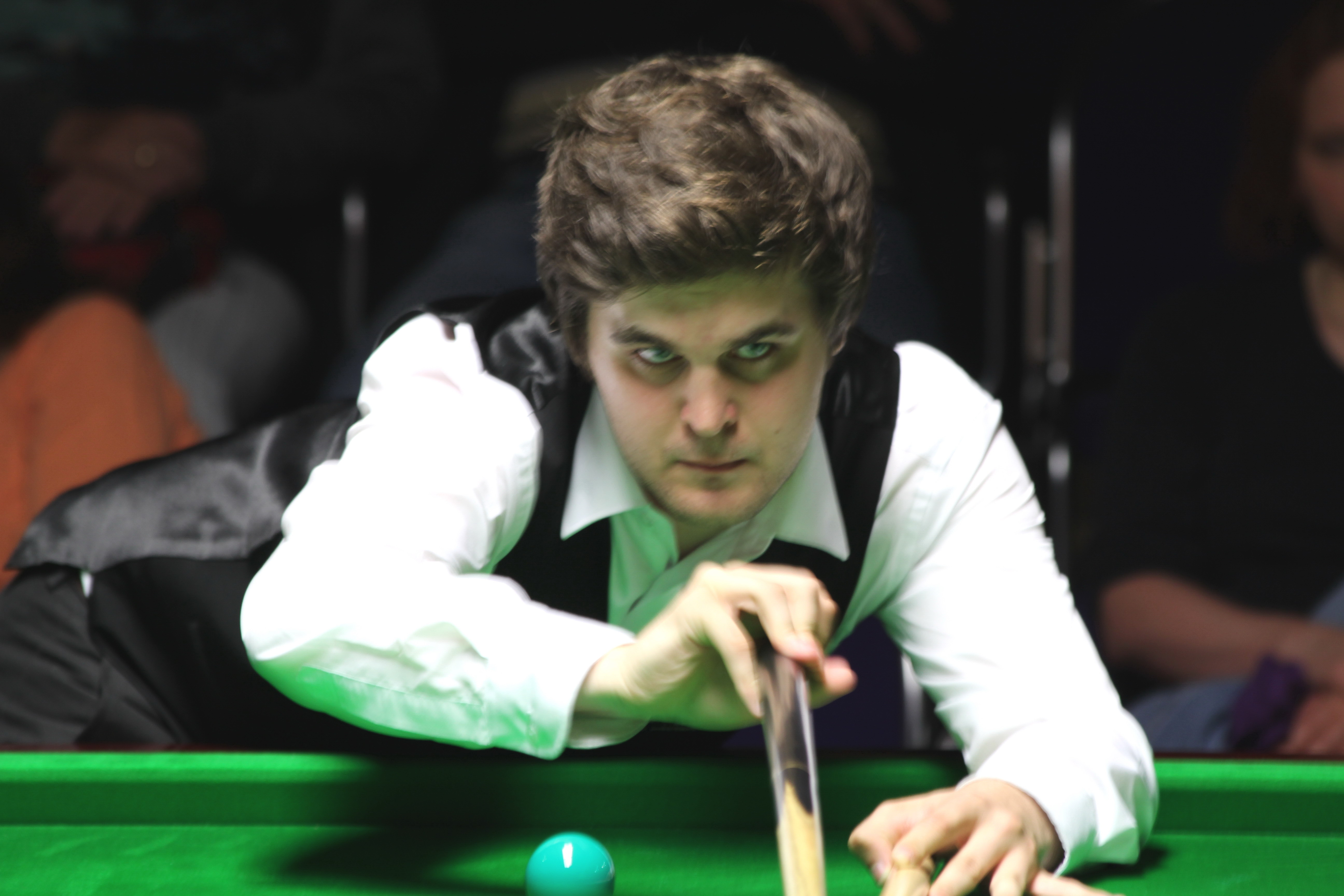
- Wilson at the 2013 Paul Hunter Classic

Personal information
- Born: 6 April 1990 (age 36) Southend-on-Sea, Essex, England

Sport
- Country: England
- Sport: Snooker
- Professional: 2015–2017
- Highest ranking: 80 (June 2016)

Sydney Wilson (born 6 April 1990 in Southend-on-Sea, Essex) is an English former professional snooker player.

== Career ==
Wilson began playing snooker at the age of three with his father teaching him the basics of the game. He later took lessons from Vic Harris, a former professional player. As a teenager, he beat most of the best players in his class and won several junior tournaments. At 15, he began playing in the Pontin's International Open Series. He participated for five seasons with his best finish being a second round defeat in 2009. Due to a lack of financial opportunities he had to sell his own snooker table and could not afford to practice full-time. He played in 2011 Q School but could not get beyond the third round. In the 2011–12 season he took part in seven of the twelve tournaments in the Players Tour Championship.

The following year he won a match in the main rounds of a PTC for the first time with a 4–2 success over Gerard Greene in the first event in Gloucester. Wilson was knocked out 4–3 by Dave Harold in the second round. In Q School, he lost in the fourth round in the second and third events. His high Q School Order of Merit placing gave him entry into many ranking event qualifiers for the 2013–14 season, but he was unable to win a match. Wilson made his debut at the venue stage of a ranking event at the 2014 Welsh Open and he led world number 11 Mark Allen 3–0 and made a break of 54 in the fourth frame. However, Allen responded by winning four successive frames to edge it 4–3, with Wilson stating afterwards that a kick in the fourth frame had ruined his chance of winning. He came within two wins of securing a professional tour card in the first event of Q School, but lost 4–3 to Duane Jones.

Wilson's only win during the 2014–15 season came at the 2015 German Masters when he defeated Anthony Hamilton 5–3, before losing by a reverse of this scoreline to Ryan Day. In the second round of the first event of the 2015 Q School he defeated ex-professional Marcus Campbell. Wilson won three more matches to reach the final round and beat Chen Zhe 4–1 to seal his professional status for the first time, earning a two-year tour card starting with the 2015–16 season, with Wilson stating that his goal is to remain on tour. He won his first match on tour by beating Oliver Brown 5–2 in the first round of the 2015 Australian Goldfields Open qualifiers, before losing 5–2 to Jack Lisowski. At the UK Championship Wilson won a ranking event match at the venue stage for the first time in his career by seeing off Michael White, who at world number 15 was ranked 100 places higher than Wilson. He lost 6–2 to Mark Joyce in the subsequent round. In the German Masters qualifiers, Mike Dunn edged past Wilson 5–4 and by 86–79 points on the final black. Wilson defeated Gerard Greene 4–3 at the Welsh Open, but lost 4–1 to Matthew Selt in the second round.

Wilson opened the 2016–17 season with 11 straight defeats, before beating Dechawat Poomjaeng 4–2 at the Scottish Open. He was defeated 4–1 by Liang Wenbo in the second round. Wilson recorded a 10–6 victory over Kurt Maflin in the first round of World Championship qualifying, before losing 10–7 to Rory McLeod and was relegated from the tour after not getting past the third round of both Q School events.

Wilson has practiced in Stepfield Snooker Club in Witham, where two-time World Championship runner-up Ali Carter plays.

== Performance and rankings timeline ==
Tournament	2011/ 12	2012/ 13	2013/ 14	2014/ 15	2015/ 16	2016/ 17	2019/ 20	2021/ 22
Ranking (Note: It shows the ranking at the beginning of the season.)	(Note: He was an amateur.)				(Note: New players on the Main Tour don't have a ranking.)	101		
Ranking tournaments
Championship League	Non-Ranking Event							RR
British Open	Tournament Not Held							A
Northern Ireland Open	Tournament Not Held					1R	A	A
English Open	Tournament Not Held					1R	A	A
UK Championship	A	A	A	A	2R	1R	A	A
Scottish Open	NH	MR	Tournament Not Held			2R	A	A
World Grand Prix	Tournament Not Held			NR	DNQ	DNQ	DNQ	DNQ
Shoot-Out	Non-Ranking Event					1R	A	A
German Masters	A	A	LQ	LQ	LQ	LQ	A	A
Players Championship (Note: The event was called the Players Tour Championship Finals (2011/2012–2015/2016))	DNQ	DNQ	DNQ	DNQ	DNQ	DNQ	DNQ	DNQ
European Masters	Tournament Not Held					LQ	A	A
Welsh Open	A	A	1R	1R	2R	1R	A	A
Turkish Masters	Tournament Not Held							A
Gibraltar Open	Tournament Not Held				MR	1R	A	A
Tour Championship	Tournament Not Held						DNQ	DNQ
World Championship	A	A	LQ	LQ	LQ	LQ	WD	A
Former ranking tournaments
Wuxi Classic	NR	A	LQ	LQ	Tournament Not Held			
Australian Goldfields Open	A	A	LQ	LQ	LQ	Tournament Not Held		
Paul Hunter Classic	Minor-Ranking Event					1R	NR	NH
Shanghai Masters	A	A	LQ	LQ	LQ	LQ	NR	NH
Indian Open	Not Held		LQ	LQ	NH	LQ	Not Held	
China Open	A	A	LQ	LQ	LQ	LQ	Not Held	
Riga Masters (Note: The event was called the Riga Open (2014/2015–2015/2016))	Tournament Not Held			Minor-Ranking		LQ	A	NH
International Championship	NH	A	A	LQ	LQ	LQ	A	NH
China Championship	Tournament Not Held					NR	A	NH
World Open (Note: The event was called the Haikou World Open (2011/2012–2013/2014))	A	A	LQ	Not Held		LQ	A	NH

Performance Table Legend
LQ	lost in the qualifying draw	#R	lost in the early rounds of the tournament (WR = Wildcard round, RR = Round robin)	QF	lost in the quarter-finals
SF	lost in the semi-finals	F	lost in the final	W	won the tournament
DNQ	did not qualify for the tournament	A	did not participate in the tournament	WD	withdrew from the tournament

NH / Not Held	means an event was not held.
NR / Non-Ranking Event	means an event is/was no longer a ranking event.
R / Ranking Event	means an event is/was a ranking event.
MR / Minor-Ranking Event	means an event is/was a minor-ranking event.
