= Duane Jones (snooker player) =

Welsh snooker player

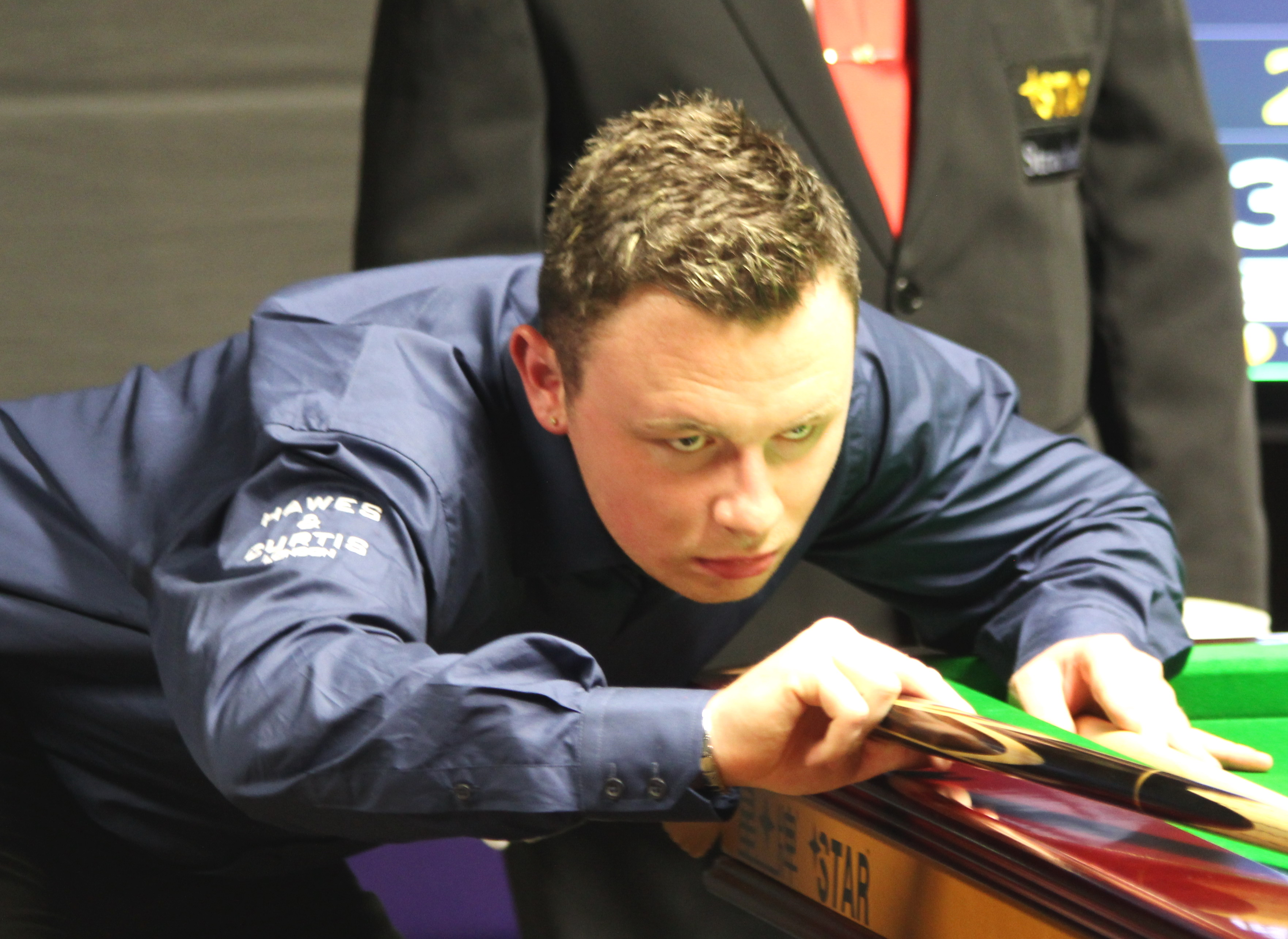
- Jones at the 2015 Paul Hunter Classic

Personal information
- Born: 30 April 1993 (age 33) Mountain Ash, Rhondda Cynon Taf, Wales

Sport
- Country: Wales
- Sport: Snooker
- Professional: 2015–2023, 2024-2026
- Highest ranking: 69 (July 2025)
- Best ranking finish: Semi-final (2019 German Masters)

Duane Jones (born 30 April 1993) is a former Welsh professional snooker player.

== Career ==
=== Junior ===
Jones started playing snooker aged twelve, joining his local snooker club and playing on full sized tables after being impressed at how easy Jimmy White made the game look on television. He later became Welsh under-16 captain and the youngest player to win the singles in the Aberdare Valley Snooker League.

=== Amateur ===
During the 2010–11 season, Jones started to feature in Players Tour Championship events, as well as Q School and ranking events as a top up player. In the 2013 Welsh Open, Jones beat former World Championship semi-finalist Andy Hicks in the opening round of qualifying 4–3, before a narrow 4–3 defeat to former world champion Neil Robertson in the following round. Jones, lost at the final stage of Q School in 2013 (to Lee Spick) and 2014 (to Chris Melling), however these performance did earn him the chance to compete in more ranking events as a top up amateur player. The most notable result he recorded being a 5–2 win over top 16 player Joe Perry with breaks of 141, 137, 75 and 74 to qualify for the 2014 China Open, where he lost 5–3 to Yu Delu in the first round.

=== Professional ===
Jones was successful in the 2015 Q School and earned a tour card for the 2015–16 and 2016–17 seasons by beating Zhao Xintong 4–3 in his final match of the second event, in a black ball finish in the deciding frame. His first win as a professional came at attempt number one as he defeated Sam Thistlewhite 5–1 in the 2015 Australian Goldfields Open qualifiers, before falling 5–1 to Sam Baird. Jones only won one more match in the rest of the season, which included losing his last eight.

Jones qualified for the 2016 Indian Open with a 4–2 victory over Yu Delu and narrowly beat Liam Highfield 4–3 in the first round to reach the last 32 of a ranking event for the first time, where he lost 4–1 to Peter Ebdon. He got to the second round in three of the four Home Nations tournaments, but was knocked out each time. He finished the year outside the top 64, but immediately regained his professional status with a victory in event two of Q-School. Wins over Simon Bedford, Peter Delaney, Declan Brennan, Hao Hu and Alex Davies ensured Jones would be back on the tour for the next two seasons.

Jones regained a tour card by coming through the 23/24 Q Tour Global Playoff, winning event 1.

== Performance and rankings timeline ==
Tournament	2010/ 11	2011/ 12	2012/ 13	2013/ 14	2014/ 15	2015/ 16	2016/ 17	2017/ 18	2018/ 19	2019/ 20	2020/ 21	2021/ 22	2022/ 23	2023/ 24	2024/ 25	2025/ 26
Ranking (Note: It shows the ranking at the beginning of the season)	(Note: He was an amateur)					(Note: New players on the Main Tour don't have a ranking)	118	(Note: Players qualified through Q School started the season without prize money ranking points)	79	(Note: Players qualified One Year Ranking List started the season without ranking points)	88		75			69
Ranking tournaments
Championship League	Non-Ranking Event										RR	RR	RR	RR	RR	RR
Saudi Arabia Masters	Tournament Not Held														3R	3R
Wuhan Open	Tournament Not Held													A	3R	LQ
English Open	Tournament Not Held						2R	1R	1R	1R	1R	LQ	LQ	A	LQ	LQ
British Open	Tournament Not Held											3R	LQ	A	1R	LQ
Xi'an Grand Prix	Tournament Not Held														LQ	LQ
Northern Ireland Open	Tournament Not Held						2R	2R	1R	1R	1R	1R	LQ	LQ	LQ	LQ
International Championship	Not Held		A	A	A	A	LQ	LQ	LQ	1R	Not Held			A	LQ	LQ
UK Championship	A	A	WD	A	A	1R	1R	1R	1R	1R	1R	1R	LQ	LQ	LQ	LQ
Shoot Out	Non-Ranking Event						1R	2R	1R	1R	2R	3R	1R	3R	3R	2R
Scottish Open	Not Held		MR	Not Held			2R	1R	1R	1R	1R	1R	LQ	LQ	LQ	LQ
German Masters	A	A	A	LQ	LQ	LQ	LQ	LQ	SF	LQ	1R	LQ	LQ	A	LQ	LQ
World Grand Prix	Tournament Not Held				NR	DNQ	DNQ	DNQ	DNQ	DNQ	DNQ	DNQ	DNQ	DNQ	DNQ	DNQ
Players Championship (Note: The event was called the Players Tour Championship Grand Final (2010/2011–2015/2016))	DNQ	DNQ	DNQ	DNQ	DNQ	DNQ	DNQ	DNQ	DNQ	DNQ	DNQ	DNQ	DNQ	DNQ	DNQ	DNQ
Welsh Open	A	A	LQ	1R	1R	1R	1R	1R	3R	1R	1R	LQ	LQ	2R	LQ	LQ
World Open	A	A	LQ	A	Not Held		1R	1R	LQ	LQ	Not Held			A	2R	LQ
Tour Championship	Tournament Not Held								DNQ	DNQ	DNQ	DNQ	DNQ	DNQ	DNQ	DNQ
World Championship	A	A	A	A	A	LQ	LQ	LQ	LQ	LQ	LQ	LQ	LQ	LQ	LQ	LQ
Former ranking tournaments
Wuxi Classic	Non-Ranking		LQ	A	A	Tournament Not Held										
Australian Goldfields Open	NH	A	LQ	A	A	LQ	Tournament Not Held									
Shanghai Masters	A	A	A	LQ	A	LQ	LQ	LQ	Non-Ranking		Not Held			Non-Ranking		
Indian Open	Not Held			A	A	NH	2R	1R	1R	Tournament Not Held						
China Open	A	A	A	1R	A	A	LQ	2R	LQ	Tournament Not Held						
Riga Masters (Note: The event was called the Riga Open (2014/2015–2015/2016))	Tournament Not Held				Minor-Rank		LQ	LQ	LQ	WD	Tournament Not Held					
China Championship	Tournament Not Held						NR	LQ	LQ	LQ	Tournament Not Held					
WST Pro Series	Tournament Not Held										RR	Tournament Not Held				
Turkish Masters	Tournament Not Held											LQ	Tournament Not Held			
Gibraltar Open	Tournament Not Held					MR	2R	1R	1R	2R	1R	2R	Tournament Not Held			
WST Classic	Tournament Not Held												1R	Not Held		
European Masters	Tournament Not Held						LQ	LQ	1R	LQ	3R	1R	LQ	3R	Not Held	
Former non-ranking tournaments
Six-red World Championship	A	NH	A	A	A	A	A	A	A	A	Not Held		LQ	Not Held		

Performance Table Legend
LQ	lost in the qualifying draw	#R	lost in the early rounds of the tournament (WR = Wildcard round, RR = Round robin)	QF	lost in the quarter-finals
SF	lost in the semi-finals	F	lost in the final	W	won the tournament
DNQ	did not qualify for the tournament	A	did not participate in the tournament	WD	withdrew from the tournament

NH / Not Held	means an event was not held.
NR / Non-Ranking Event	means an event is/was no longer a ranking event.
R / Ranking Event	means an event is/was a ranking event.
MR / Minor-Ranking Event	means an event is/was a minor-ranking event.

== Career finals ==
=== Amateur finals: 3 (2 titles) ===
Outcome	No.	Year	Championship	Opponent in the final	Score
Runner-up	1.	2008	Junior Pot Black	(Republic of Ireland) Jason Devaney	0–1
Winner	1.	2012	Welsh Amateur Championship	(Wales) Elfed Evans	8–4
Winner	2.	2013	IBSF World 6-Reds Snooker Championship	(Republic of Ireland) Michael Judge	6–4
