= Michael Georgiou =

British-Cypriot snooker player

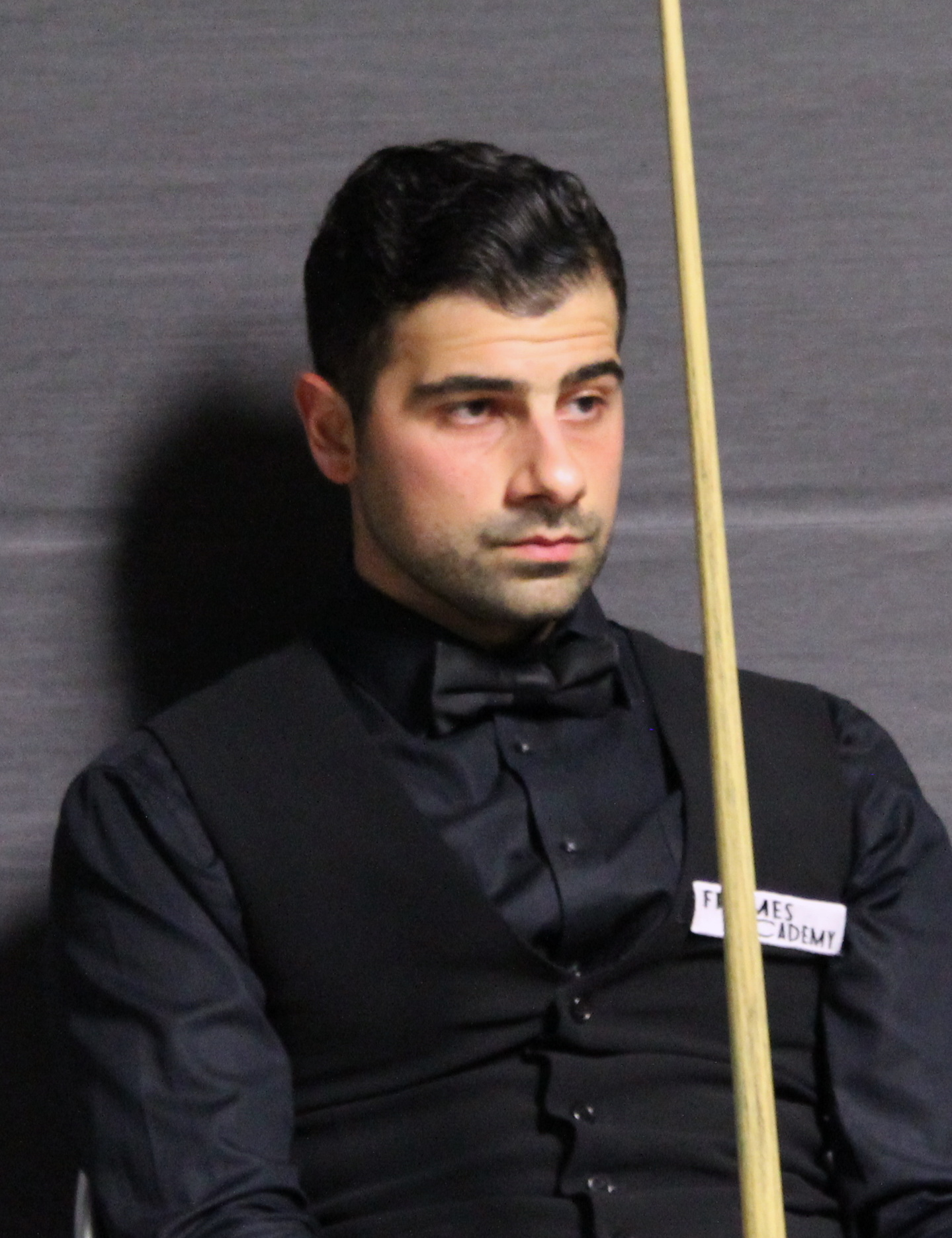
- Georgiou at the 2016 Paul Hunter Classic

Personal information
- Nickname: The Pride of Cyprus
- Born: 18 January 1988 (age 38) Forest Hill, England

Sport
- Country: England (until 2016); Cyprus (2016–present)
- Sport: Snooker
- Professional: 2008/2009, 2014–2020
- Highest ranking: 46 (May–July 2019)
- Maximum breaks: 1

Tournament wins
- Ranking: 1

Michael Georgiou (born 18 January 1988) is a British-Cypriot former professional snooker player from Forest Hill. He is a practice partner of Igor Figueiredo and Hammad Miah, who practises at Whetstone Snooker Club.

In 2018, Georgiou won his first professional ranking title by defeating Graeme Dott in the final of the Snooker Shoot-Out.

Michael Georgiou made the 140th official maximum break in the third frame of the last 128 match against Umut Dikme at the 2018 Paul Hunter Classic. It was Michael's first professional maximum break.

In 2019 he became the first Cypriot player to qualify for the World Snooker Championship in Sheffield defeating Lee Walker 10–7, Peter Ebdon 10–8 and Yan Bingtao 10–8 in the 3 qualifying rounds to make his Crucible debut.

== Career ==
Georgiou qualified for the main tour by winning the 2007 IBSF World Under-21 Snooker Championship in India. However it was a season to forget as he failed to win a single match and lost his tour place as a result.

Georgiou spent the next two seasons competing in the PIOS series then decided to give up snooker and started a career in recruitment. He commented: "I was doing a 9-to-5 job, sitting behind a desk. But I always kept an eye on snooker and when I saw how the sport had changed and the opportunities that are there now, I decided to give it another try". Georgiou returned to serious action in 2013 as he entered the Q School, his best run coming at the second event where he defeated Dessie Sheehan and Darren Bond, before losing to eventual qualifier Ahmed Saif. Georgiou continued to enter European Tour events as an amateur during the 2013/14 season, while also participating in the EBSA Qualifying Tour where he reached final of one of the tournaments to qualify for the play-offs. There Georgiou was beaten to the two-year tour card by Zak Surety; however he was more successful in the 2014 Q School where, after losing early in Event 1, he went all the way in Event 2 by defeating Adam Wicheard, Gareth Green, Sean O'Sullivan, Jordan Brown and in the final round Ashley Carty to confirm his return to the main tour for the 2014–15 and 2015–16 seasons.

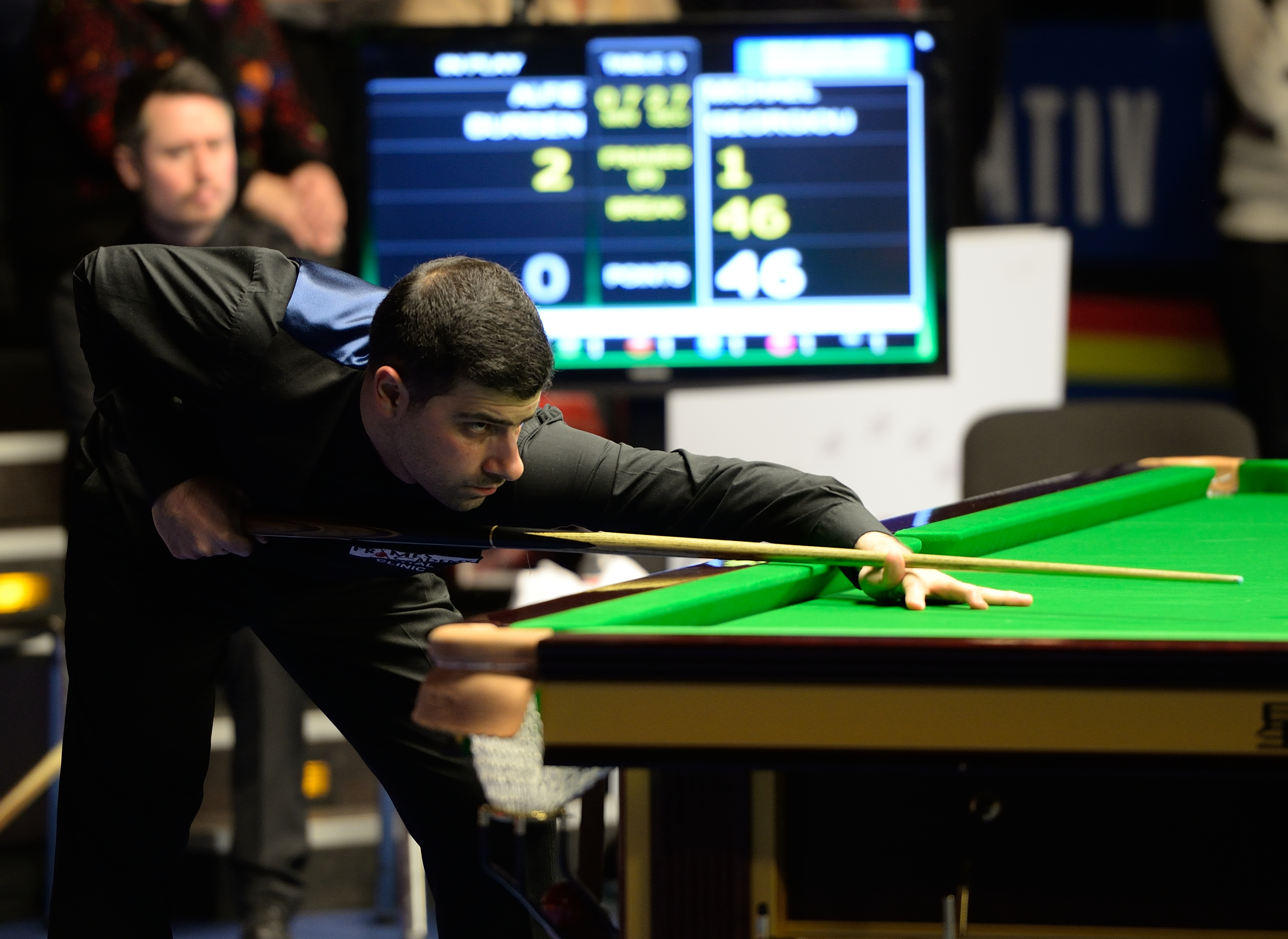
Michael Georgiou at 2015 German Masters

Georgiou started his comeback season in the best possible way as he whitewashed Aditya Mehta 5–0 to qualify for the venue stages of the 2014 Wuxi Classic, where he beat Marcus Campbell 5–2, before losing 5–3 to Neil Robertson. Anthony McGill eliminated him 6–4 in the first round of the UK Championship, but Georgiou then overcame 2006 world champion Graeme Dott 5–1 and Andrew Pagett 5–3 in qualifying for the German Masters. He lost 5–3 against Alfie Burden. Georgiou's best form came at the Welsh Open where he defeated Peter Lines 4–1, Lee Walker 4–2 and Dott 4–3 to reach the last 16 of a ranking event for the first time. However, he suffered a 4–2 defeat to four-time world champion John Higgins.

Georgiou made his debut in the Australian Goldfields Open by beating Ross Muir 5–0, Aditya Mehta 5–4 and David Gilbert 5–4, but lost 5–2 to John Higgins in the first round. Before the UK Championship he had been practicing with seven-time world champion Stephen Hendry and knocked out David Morris 6–5 in the opening round. He was defeated 6–2 by Mark Allen in the second round. Gergiou reached the third round of the Welsh Open by overcoming Jamie Jones 4–0 and Peter Ebdon 4–2, but lost 4–1 to Higgins for the second year in a row. He needed to qualify for the World Championship to remain on tour, but lost his opening game 10–6 to Noppon Saengkham meaning he needed to come through Q School to earn his place back.

Georgiou announced that he would be representing Cyprus at the 2016 Q School. Georgiou was successful in the second event, regaining his tour place defeating Craig Steadman 4–1 in the final round and as a result would qualify for the tour as a Cypriot player. He got to the third round of the Paul Hunter Classic courtesy of beating Fraser Patrick 4–1 and David Gilbert 4–2 and lost 4–1 to Gerard Greene. Georgiou secured 6–2 and 6–4 wins over Matthew Selt and Mike Dunn to set up a third round encounter with Ronnie O'Sullivan at the UK Championship. Georgiou took the opening frame, but would go on to lose 6–1 and described his opponent as not human after the match such was his standard of play. He had a fourth round showing at the Shoot-Out and was eliminated by Andy Hicks. Georgiou moved out of London to Northern Ireland for a different pace of life and to be around fellow pro's Jordan Brown and Mark Allen, however results didn't follow and after a second round defeat to Jimmy White in qualifying for the delayed 2020 World Snooker Championship saw his ranking drop low enough for him to be off the professional tour.

== Performance and rankings timeline ==
Tournament	2008/ 09	2014/ 15	2015/ 16	2016/ 17	2017/ 18	2018/ 19	2019/ 20	2021/ 22	2022/ 23
Ranking (Note: From the 2010/2011 season it shows the ranking at the beginning of the season.)	(Note: New players don't have a ranking)		90	(Note: Players qualified through the Q School started the season without ranking points)	74	49	46	(Note: He was an amateur)	
Ranking tournaments
Championship League	Tournament Not Held							RR	A
European Masters	Tournament Not Held			LQ	2R	1R	LQ	LQ	A
British Open	Tournament Not Held							2R	A
Northern Ireland Open	Tournament Not Held			2R	2R	1R	1R	LQ	A
UK Championship	LQ	1R	2R	3R	2R	1R	2R	1R	A
Scottish Open	Tournament Not Held			2R	1R	2R	1R	1R	A
English Open	Tournament Not Held			1R	1R	1R	2R	1R	A
World Grand Prix	NH	NR	DNQ	DNQ	2R	DNQ	DNQ	DNQ	DNQ
Shoot Out	NH	Non-Ranking		4R	W	2R	1R	4R	2R
German Masters	NH	1R	LQ	LQ	1R	1R	QF	1R	A
Welsh Open	LQ	4R	3R	1R	2R	4R	1R	LQ	A
Players Championship (Note: The event was called the Players Tour Championship Grand Final (2014/2015–2015/2016))	NH	DNQ	DNQ	DNQ	DNQ	DNQ	DNQ	DNQ	DNQ
Tour Championship	Tournament Not Held					DNQ	DNQ	DNQ	DNQ
World Championship	LQ	LQ	LQ	LQ	LQ	1R	LQ	LQ	LQ
Non-ranking tournaments
Champion of Champions	NH	A	A	A	A	1R	A	A	A
The Masters	LQ	A	A	A	A	A	A	A	A
Former ranking tournaments
Northern Ireland Trophy	LQ	Tournament Not Held							
Bahrain Championship	LQ	Tournament Not Held							
Wuxi Classic (Note: The event was called the Jiangsu Classic (2008/2009))	NR	2R	Tournament Not Held						
Australian Goldfields Open	NH	LQ	1R	Tournament Not Held					
Shanghai Masters	LQ	LQ	LQ	LQ	1R	Non-Ranking		Not Held	
Paul Hunter Classic	PA	Minor-Ranking		3R	3R	2R	NR	Not Held	
Indian Open	NH	LQ	NH	2R	LQ	1R	Tournament Not Held		
China Open	LQ	LQ	LQ	LQ	LQ	LQ	Tournament Not Held		
Riga Masters (Note: The event was called the Riga Open (2014/2015–2015/2016))	NH	Minor-Ranking		1R	1R	LQ	LQ	Not Held	
International Championship	NH	LQ	LQ	LQ	LQ	1R	LQ	Not Held	
China Championship	Tournament Not Held			NR	1R	LQ	LQ	Not Held	
World Open (Note: The event was called the Grand Prix (2008/2009))	LQ	Not Held		LQ	1R	1R	1R	Not Held	
Turkish Masters	Tournament Not Held							LQ	NH
Gibraltar Open	Not Held		MR	1R	3R	2R	1R	3R	NH
Former non-ranking tournaments
Shoot Out	NH	A	1R	Ranking Event					
Haining Open	NH	Minor-Ranking		A	A	3R	4R	A	NH

Performance Table Legend
LQ	lost in the qualifying draw	#R	lost in the early rounds of the tournament (WR = Wildcard round, RR = Round robin)	QF	lost in the quarter-finals
SF	lost in the semi-finals	F	lost in the final	W	won the tournament
DNQ	did not qualify for the tournament	A	did not participate in the tournament	WD	withdrew from the tournament

NH / Not Held	means an event was not held.
NR / Non-Ranking Event	means an event is/was no longer a ranking event.
R / Ranking Event	means an event is/was a ranking event.
MR / Minor-Ranking Event	means an event is/was a minor-ranking event.

== Career finals ==
=== Ranking finals: 1 (1 title) ===
Outcome	No.	Year	Championship	Opponent in the final	Score
Winner	1.	2018	Snooker Shoot Out	(Scotland) Graeme Dott	1–0

=== Non-ranking finals: 1 ===
Outcome	No.	Year	Championship	Opponent in the final	Score
Runner-up	1.	2025	World Games	(China) Xiao Guodong	1–2

=== Pro-am finals: 3 (2 titles) ===
Outcome	No.	Year	Championship	Opponent in the final	Score
Winner	1.	2009	Pontins Autumn Open	(Wales) David Donovan	5–2
Winner	2.	2018	Vienna Snooker Open	(Scotland) Ross Muir	5–4
Runner-up	1.	2018	Golden Q Cup	(Belgium) Luca Brecel	1–5

=== Amateur finals: 2 (1 title) ===
Outcome	No.	Year	Championship	Opponent in the final	Score
Runner-up	1.	2007	English Under-19 Championship	(England) John Astley	1–5
Winner	1.	2007	IBSF World Under-21 Championship	(China) Zhang Anda	11–6
Winner	2.	2025	Commonwealth Snooker Championship	(Scotland) Ross Vallance	3–0
