= Malcolm Bradley =

English snooker player

Personal information
- Born: 8 July 1948 (age 78)

Sport
- Country: England
- Sport: Snooker
- Professional: 1984–1992
- Highest ranking: 40

Malcolm Bradley (born 8 July 1948) is an English former professional snooker player.

== Career ==
In 1982, Bradley reached the final of the English Amateur Championship, finishing as runner-up after being defeated 9–13 by Dave Chalmers. Bradley and Chalmers both represented England at the 1982 IBSF World Snooker Championship. Bradley qualified from his round-robin qualifying group with seven wins in eight matches, but lost 0–5 in the quarter-finals to the eventual champion Terry Parsons.

Having previously applied to become a professional player in 1983, he was accepted by the World Professional Billiards and Snooker Association on 8 May 1984.

A successful first season, which included reaching the last 16 of the 1985 British Open, saw him achieve 40th place for the Snooker world rankings 1985/1986. This was the highest ranking he attained in his professional career, and his performance in the British Open was the furthest he ever progressed in a ranking tournament.

Bradley's best finish at the World Snooker Championship was in 1987, when in the qualifying competition he reached the last 48 with wins against Brian Rowswell and Joe O'Boye before losing 7–10 against Jim Wych.

He ended the 1991–92 snooker season ranked 130th, and did not play professionally again.

== Career highlights ==
Outcome	Year	Championship	Opponent in the final	Score	Ref.
Runner-up	1982	English Amateur Championship	Dave Chalmers (ENG)	9–13	
