= European Tour 2013/2014 – Event 2 =

European Tour 2013/2014 Event 2

Tournament information
- Dates: 18–21 July 2013
- Venue: Topsport Centrum
- City: Rotterdam
- Country: Netherlands
- Organisation: World Snooker
- Format: Minor-ranking event
- Total prize fund: €125,000
- Winner's share: €25,000
- Highest break: Matthew Selt (ENG) (142)

Final
- Champion: Mark Williams (WAL)
- Runner-up: Mark Selby (ENG)
- Score: 4–3

The European Tour 2013/2014 – Event 2 (also known as the 2013 Rotterdam Open) was a professional minor-ranking snooker tournament that took place between 18 and 21 July 2013 at the Topsport Centrum in Rotterdam, Netherlands. This was the second ever professional snooker tournament in the Netherlands after the 1991 European Open.

Mark Williams won his 25th professional title by defeating Mark Selby 4–3 in the final.

== Prize fund and ranking points ==
The breakdown of prize money and ranking points of the event is shown below:

	Prize fund	Ranking points^{1}
Winner	€25,000	2,000
Runner-up	€12,000	1,600
Semi-finalist	€6,000	1,280
Quarter-finalist	€4,000	1,000
Last 16	€2,300	760
Last 32	€1,200	560
Last 64	€700	360
Total	€125,000	–

- ^{1} Only professional players can earn ranking points.

== Main draw ==
=== Preliminary rounds ===
==== Round 1 ====
Best of 7 frames

(England) Sam Thistlewhite	4–3	(England) Saqib Nasir
(Germany) Diana Schuler	0–4	(Netherlands) Theodor den Hartog
(Netherlands) Ton Berkhout	w/o–w/d	(India) David Singh
(England) Joe Steele	3–4	(Belgium) Wendy Jans
(Netherlands) Mitchell Van Den Bergh	0–4	(Scotland) Dylan Craig
(Northern Ireland) Jordan Brown	4–0	(England) Zen Beechey
(Wales) Alex Taubman	4–0	(Belgium) Olivier Vandenboheede
(England) Adam Edge	4–1	(Belgium) Jean Pierre De Blaer
(Belgium) Kevin Van Hove	4–1	(England) Bash Maqsood
(England) Kashif Khan	0–4	(Netherlands) Jasha Kiers
(England) Gareth Green	4–0	(Wales) Kishan Hirani
(England) Sanderson Lam	4–3	(England) Ian Glover
(Netherlands) Leon Alewijnse	0–4	(England) Matthew Day
(England) Damian Wilks	4–0	(Netherlands) Xander van Rossum
(Netherlands) Kevin Chan	0–4	(England) Jeff Cundy
(Poland) Talip Yigitsoy	0–4	(Netherlands) Jeroen Van Driel
(Portugal) Filipe Cardoso	0–4	(Belgium) Kevin Vandevoort
(England) James Silverwood	w/d–w/o	(Belgium) Wan Chooi Tan
(England) Daniel Ward	4–1	(Netherlands) Ameer Baksh
(Netherlands) Frans Veling	2–4	(England) Jordan Geldard
(England) Ryan Causton	4–3	(England) Thomas Newcombe

(Netherlands) Manon Melief	0–4	(England) Joe Roberts
(England) Henry Roper	0–4	(Scotland) Marc Davis
(Belgium) Jurian Heusdens	4–0	(Netherlands) Huib Kuilboer
(Netherlands) Bas Verviers	0–4	(England) Benji Buckley
(Sweden) Ron Florax	0–4	(Belgium) Alain Van Der Steen
(Thailand) Ratchayothin Yotharuck	2–4	(England) Mitchell Travis
(Netherlands) Feylin Janssen	4–0	(Netherlands) Toby van Diepen
(Netherlands) Gosse Vledder	0–4	(Germany) Phil Barnes
(Netherlands) Rene Dikstra	1–4	(England) Oliver Brown
(England) Michael Tomlinson	3–4	(England) Shane Castle
(England) Ben Harrison	4–2	(England) Michael Wild
(Netherlands) Emile Bastiaan Hendriksen	0–4	(Wales) Ben Jones
(Netherlands) Juriaan Van Den Nieuwenhuizen	0–4	(England) Mark Vincent
(Netherlands) Nico Bouma	0–4	(England) Jamie Bodle
(Netherlands) Sander Tierolf	w/o–w/d	(England) Craig Barber
(England) Michael Georgiou	4–0	(Netherlands) Albert Pronk
(England) Sydney Wilson	4–1	(Scotland) Ross Higgins
(England) Phil O'Kane	4–1	(Netherlands) Raymond Huisman
(Wales) Gareth Allen	4–0	(Netherlands) Jarl Hinfelaar
(Belgium) Pascal Decloedt	0–4	(England) Christopher Keogan

==== Round 2 ====
Best of 7 frames

(England) Sam Harvey	4–3	(England) Sam Thistlewhite
(Netherlands) Fozan Masood	4–2	(Netherlands) Theodor den Hartog
(Netherlands) Florian Moederscheim	2–4	(Netherlands) Ton Berkhout
(England) Matthew Couch	4–1	(Belgium) Wendy Jans
(Scotland) Dylan Craig	4–2	(Northern Ireland) Jordan Brown
(England) Declan Weston	2–4	(Wales) Alex Taubman
(England) Martin Ball	4–1	(England) Adam Edge
(Belgium) Kevin Van Hove	4–0	(Netherlands) Jasha Kiers
(England) Gareth Green	4–1	(England) Sanderson Lam
(England) Matthew Day	4–2	(England) Damian Wilks
(Netherlands) Mario Veltman	0–4	(England) Jeff Cundy
(Scotland) Mark Owens	4–1	(Netherlands) Jeroen Van Driel
(Belgium) Kevin Vandevoort	2–4	(Belgium) Wan Chooi Tan
(England) Daniel Ward	4–0	(England) Jordan Geldard
(England) Sean Hopkin	0–4	(England) Ryan Causton

(England) Gary Steele	0–4	(England) Joe Roberts
(Belgium) Hans Blanckaert	1–4	(Scotland) Marc Davis
(Netherlands) Jerom Meeus	1–4	(Belgium) Jurian Heusdens
(Netherlands) Bas Herberigs	1–4	(England) Benji Buckley
(Belgium) Alain Van Der Steen	0–4	(England) Mitchell Travis
(Belgium) Tomasz Skalski	4–0	(Netherlands) Feylin Janssen
(Germany) Phil Barnes	2–4	(England) Oliver Brown
(Netherlands) Joris Maas	2–4	(England) Shane Castle
(England) Charlie Walters	2–4	(England) Ben Harrison
(Wales) Ben Jones	4–3	(England) Mark Vincent
(England) Reanne Evans	4–0	(England) Jamie Bodle
(Netherlands) Sander Tierolf	1–4	(England) Michael Georgiou
(England) Sydney Wilson	4–1	(England) Phil O'Kane
(Wales) Gareth Allen	1–4	(England) Christopher Keogan

=== Main rounds ===
==== Top half ====
===== Section 1 =====
Last 128; Best of 7 frames
(Scotland) John Higgins	4
(England) Sam Harvey	0
(Wales) Andrew Pagett	0
(England) Elliot Slessor	4
(England) Michael Wasley	4
(Netherlands) Fozan Masood	2
(Wales) Daniel Wells	4
(Netherlands) Ton Berkhout	1
(England) Anthony Hamilton	4
(England) Allan Taylor	2
(England) Jack Lisowski	4
(England) Matthew Couch	1
(England) Sean O'Sullivan	2
(Scotland) Stephen Maguire	4
(England) Alfie Burden	4
(Scotland) Dylan Craig	1

Last 64; Best of 7 frames
(Scotland) John Higgins	4
(England) Elliot Slessor	1
(England) Michael Wasley	1
(Wales) Daniel Wells	4
(England) Anthony Hamilton	4
(England) Jack Lisowski	0
(Scotland) Stephen Maguire	4
(England) Alfie Burden	2

Last 32; Best of 7 frames
(Scotland) John Higgins	4
(Wales) Daniel Wells	3
(England) Anthony Hamilton	3
(Scotland) Stephen Maguire	4

Last 16; Best of 7 frames
(Scotland) John Higgins	1
(Scotland) Stephen Maguire	4

===== Section 2 =====
Last 128; Best of 7 frames
(England) Barry Pinches	w/o
(Hong Kong) Marco Fu	w/d
(England) Joel Walker	1
(India) Pankaj Advani	4
(Wales) Ryan Day	4
(England) Ryan Clark	0
(England) Stuart Carrington	4
(Wales) Alex Taubman	0
(England) Nigel Bond	w/o
(China) Liang Wenbo	w/d
(England) Ian Burns	2
(England) Chris Wakelin	4
(England) David Gilbert	4
(England) Martin Ball	0
(England) Robbie Williams	4
(England) Paul Davison	2

Last 64; Best of 7 frames
(England) Barry Pinches	2
(India) Pankaj Advani	4
(Wales) Ryan Day	4
(England) Stuart Carrington	2
(England) Nigel Bond	1
(England) Chris Wakelin	4
(England) David Gilbert	4
(England) Robbie Williams	3

Last 32; Best of 7 frames
(India) Pankaj Advani	2
(Wales) Ryan Day	4
(England) Chris Wakelin	0
(England) David Gilbert	4

Last 16; Best of 7 frames
(Wales) Ryan Day	3
(England) David Gilbert	4

===== Section 3 =====
Last 128; Best of 7 frames
(Northern Ireland) Gerard Greene	3
(England) Andrew Norman	4
(England) Mike Dunn	w/o
(England) Lee Spick	w/d
(Scotland) Anthony McGill	4
(Finland) Robin Hull	2
(England) Michael Holt	4
(Wales) Jak Jones	2
(England) James Cahill	2
(Belgium) Kevin Van Hove	4
(England) Martin Gould	4
(England) Gareth Green	1
(Wales) Jamie Jones	4
(England) Matthew Day	2
(Scotland) Michael Leslie	4
(England) Jeff Cundy	0

Last 64; Best of 7 frames
(England) Andrew Norman	4
(England) Mike Dunn	2
(Scotland) Anthony McGill	4
(England) Michael Holt	1
(Belgium) Kevin Van Hove	1
(England) Martin Gould	4
(Wales) Jamie Jones	4
(Scotland) Michael Leslie	3

Last 32; Best of 7 frames
(England) Andrew Norman	3
(Scotland) Anthony McGill	4
(England) Martin Gould	4
(Wales) Jamie Jones	3

Last 16; Best of 7 frames
(Scotland) Anthony McGill	1
(England) Martin Gould	4

===== Section 4 =====
Last 128; Best of 7 frames
(England) Jimmy Robertson	4
(England) Chris Norbury	1
(Wales) Michael White	1
(Republic of Ireland) David Morris	4
(England) Judd Trump	4
(Australia) Vinnie Calabrese	0
(England) Mark Joyce	4
(Scotland) Mark Owens	3
(England) John Astley	w/o
(Egypt) Mohamed Khairy	w/d
(Scotland) Fraser Patrick	4
(Belgium) Wan Chooi Tan	2
(Scotland) Scott Donaldson	1
(England) Mark Selby	4
(England) Andrew Higginson	2
(England) Daniel Ward	4

Last 64; Best of 7 frames
(England) Jimmy Robertson	4
(Republic of Ireland) David Morris	2
(England) Judd Trump	4
(England) Mark Joyce	0
(England) John Astley	4
(Scotland) Fraser Patrick	2
(England) Mark Selby	4
(England) Daniel Ward	0

Last 32; Best of 7 frames
(England) Jimmy Robertson	4
(England) Judd Trump	3
(England) John Astley	2
(England) Mark Selby	4

Last 16; Best of 7 frames
(England) Jimmy Robertson	0
(England) Mark Selby	4

==== Bottom half ====
===== Section 5 =====
Last 128; Best of 7 frames
(England) Barry Hawkins	w/d
(England) Ryan Causton	w/o
(England) Adam Duffy	0
(England) Stuart Bingham	4
(England) Simon Bedford	3
(England) Joe Roberts	4
(England) Hammad Miah	4
(Scotland) Marc Davis	1
(Scotland) Marcus Campbell	4
(Belgium) Jurian Heusdens	1
(England) Matthew Selt	4
(England) Peter Lines	2
(England) Robert Milkins	4
(England) Craig Steadman	2
(England) Martin O'Donnell	4
(England) Benji Buckley	0

Last 64; Best of 7 frames
(England) Ryan Causton	1
(England) Stuart Bingham	4
(England) Joe Roberts	1
(England) Hammad Miah	4
(Scotland) Marcus Campbell	4
(England) Matthew Selt	3
(England) Robert Milkins	2
(England) Martin O'Donnell	4

Last 32; Best of 7 frames
(England) Stuart Bingham	4
(England) Hammad Miah	3
(Scotland) Marcus Campbell	3
(England) Martin O'Donnell	4

Last 16; Best of 7 frames
(England) Stuart Bingham	4
(England) Martin O'Donnell	0

===== Section 6 =====
Last 128; Best of 7 frames
(Scotland) Alan McManus	2
(India) Aditya Mehta	4
(Wales) Mark Williams	w/o
(England) Jimmy White	w/d
(Republic of Ireland) Fergal O'Brien	4
(England) Mitchell Travis	0
(England) Jamie O'Neill	4
(England) Rory McLeod	3
(Norway) Kurt Maflin	4
(Scotland) Ross Muir	2
(England) Tom Ford	4
(Thailand) Noppon Saengkham	2
(England) Sam Baird	4
(Belgium) Tomasz Skalski	1
(England) Joe Perry	4
(England) Oliver Brown	2

Last 64; Best of 7 frames
(India) Aditya Mehta	0
(Wales) Mark Williams	4
(Republic of Ireland) Fergal O'Brien	2
(England) Jamie O'Neill	4
(Norway) Kurt Maflin	4
(England) Tom Ford	0
(England) Sam Baird	4
(England) Joe Perry	3

Last 32; Best of 7 frames
(Wales) Mark Williams	4
(England) Jamie O'Neill	2
(Norway) Kurt Maflin	2
(England) Sam Baird	4

Last 16; Best of 7 frames
(Wales) Mark Williams	4
(England) Sam Baird	2

===== Section 7 =====
Last 128; Best of 7 frames
(England) Jamie Cope	4
(England) Shane Castle	3
(England) Liam Highfield	4
(Scotland) Jamie Burnett	1
(Germany) Patrick Einsle	w/o
(England) Ali Carter	w/d
(England) Gary Wilson	4
(Qatar) Ahmed Saif	2
(Wales) Matthew Stevens	4
(England) Ben Harrison	3
(England) Ben Woollaston	3
(England) Ricky Walden	4
(Northern Ireland) Joe Swail	4
(Thailand) Thanawat Thirapongpaiboon	1
(England) Shaun Murphy	4
(Wales) Ben Jones	0

Last 64; Best of 7 frames
(England) Jamie Cope	4
(England) Liam Highfield	1
(Germany) Patrick Einsle	1
(England) Gary Wilson	4
(Wales) Matthew Stevens	1
(England) Ricky Walden	4
(Northern Ireland) Joe Swail	4
(England) Shaun Murphy	3

Last 32; Best of 7 frames
(England) Jamie Cope	1
(England) Gary Wilson	4
(England) Ricky Walden	2
(Northern Ireland) Joe Swail	4

Last 16; Best of 7 frames
(England) Gary Wilson	4
(Northern Ireland) Joe Swail	2

===== Section 8 =====
Last 128; Best of 7 frames
(Malta) Tony Drago	4
(Switzerland) Alexander Ursenbacher	3
(England) Rod Lawler	4
(England) Reanne Evans	0
(England) Mark Davis	4
(England) Michael Georgiou	2
(Belgium) Luca Brecel	2
(England) Lee Page	4
(Wales) Dominic Dale	4
(England) Alex Davies	1
(England) Kyren Wilson	4
(England) Sydney Wilson	1
(England) David Grace	4
(England) Christopher Keogan	1
(Australia) Neil Robertson	w/d
(Thailand) Passakorn Suwannawat	w/o

Last 64; Best of 7 frames
(Malta) Tony Drago	4
(England) Rod Lawler	3
(England) Mark Davis	4
(England) Lee Page	1
(Wales) Dominic Dale	1
(England) Kyren Wilson	4
(England) David Grace	4
(Thailand) Passakorn Suwannawat	2

Last 32; Best of 7 frames
(Malta) Tony Drago	2
(England) Mark Davis	4
(England) Kyren Wilson	1
(England) David Grace	4

Last 16; Best of 7 frames
(England) Mark Davis	4
(England) David Grace	1

==== Finals ====
Quarter-finals; Best of 7 frames		Semi-finals; Best of 7 frames		Final; Best of 7 frames
(Scotland) Stephen Maguire	1
(England) David Gilbert	4	(England) David Gilbert	3
(England) Martin Gould	3	(England) Mark Selby	4
(England) Mark Selby	4			(England) Mark Selby	3
(England) Stuart Bingham	2			(Wales) Mark Williams	4
(Wales) Mark Williams	4	(Wales) Mark Williams	4
(England) Gary Wilson	4	(England) Gary Wilson	3
(England) Mark Davis	3

== Century breaks ==
- 142 – Matthew Selt
- 140, 129, 102 – Ryan Day
- 140 – Rod Lawler
- 137, 107 – Martin Gould
- 137 – Stuart Carrington
- 136, 132, 115, 111 – Mark Selby
- 136, 116 – Mark Williams
- 135 – Jimmy Robertson
- 132, 100 – Fergal O'Brien
- 131 – Tom Ford
- 130 – Stephen Maguire
- 125, 113 – Judd Trump
- 125 – Martin O'Donnell
- 123, 105 – Ricky Walden
- 119 – Hammad Miah
- 116, 104 – Daniel Wells
- 116 – Joe Perry
- 113 – Gareth Allen
- 113 – Jamie Cope
- 111 – Robbie Williams
- 109, 104, 101 – John Higgins
- 108, 104 – Sam Baird
- 107, 104 – Anthony McGill
- 106 – David Gilbert
- 103 – Sydney Wilson
- 100 – Jeff Cundy
- 100 – Michael Georgiou
- 100 – Luca Brecel
- 100 – Jamie O'Neill
- 100 – Mark Joyce
