= 2018 China Championship =

2018 Evergrande China Championship
Tournament information
- Dates: 24–30 September 2018
- Venue: Guangzhou Tianhe Sports Centre
- City: Guangzhou
- Country: China
- Organisation: World Snooker
- Format: Ranking event
- Total prize fund: £725,000
- Winner's share: £150,000
- Highest break: Ali Carter (ENG) (144)

Final
- Champion: Mark Selby (ENG)
- Runner-up: John Higgins (SCO)
- Score: 10–9

The 2018 China Championship (officially the 2018 Evergrande China Championship) was professional ranking snooker tournament, that took place between 24 and 30 September 2018 in Guangzhou, China, with qualifying took place from 19 to 22 August 2018 in Preston, England. It was the fourth ranking event of the 2018/2019 season.

Luca Brecel was the defending champion, but he lost to Martin O'Donnell 3–5 in the first round. Mark Selby won the event, defeating John Higgins in the final 10–9. Selby's win was his 15th professional ranking event win.

== Prize fund ==
The event had a prize pool of £725,000, with the following breakdown for the player's reaching the following positions.

- Winner: £150,000
- Runner-up: £75,000
- Semi-final: £32,000
- Quarter-final: £20,000
- Last 16: £13,000
- Last 32: £7,500
- Last 64: £4,000
- Televised highest break: £4,000

The event also had a "rolling 147 prize" for a maximum break, which stood as £5,000.

== Main draw ==
The main draw of the event featured 64 players. Players in bold denote match winners.

=== Top half ===
**Last 64**; Best of 9 frames
(Belgium) Luca Brecel	3
**(England) Martin O'Donnell**	**5**
**(England) Tom Ford**	**5**
(England) Nigel Bond	0
(Hong Kong) Marco Fu	3
**(China) Zhang Anda**	**5**
**(China) Liang Wenbo**	**5**
(England) John Astley	3
(England) Mark Joyce	1
**(England) Joe Perry**	**5**
**(China) Lyu Haotian**	**w/o**
(England) Kyren Wilson	w/d
(England) Mark Davis	0
**(China) Xiao Guodong**	**5**
(England) Liam Highfield	1
**(England) Shaun Murphy**	**5**
**(England) Judd Trump**	**5**
(Scotland) Rhys Clark	0
(England) Anthony Hamilton	4
**(Wales) Jamie Jones**	**5**
**(England) Stuart Bingham**	**5**
(England) Peter Ebdon	3
**(China) Yan Bingtao**	**5**
(England) Chris Wakelin	4
(Norway) Kurt Maflin	3
**(England) Jack Lisowski**	**5**
**(Scotland) Scott Donaldson**	**5**
(Scotland) Stephen Maguire	2
**(China) Mei Xiwen**	**5**
(Wales) Michael White	4
(England) Allan Taylor	3
**(Scotland) John Higgins**	**5**

**Last 32**; Best of 9 frames
**(England) Martin O'Donnell**	**5**
(England) Tom Ford	4
(China) Zhang Anda	2
**(China) Liang Wenbo**	**5**
(England) Joe Perry	3
**(China) Lyu Haotian**	**5**
(China) Xiao Guodong	2
**(England) Shaun Murphy**	**5**
**(England) Judd Trump**	**5**
(Wales) Jamie Jones	2
(England) Stuart Bingham	2
**(China) Yan Bingtao**	**5**
(England) Jack Lisowski	3
**(Scotland) Scott Donaldson**	**5**
(China) Mei Xiwen	4
**(Scotland) John Higgins**	**5**

**Last 16**; Best of 9 frames
**(England) Martin O'Donnell**	**5**
(China) Liang Wenbo	2
**(China) Lyu Haotian**	**5**
(England) Shaun Murphy	3
**(England) Judd Trump**	**5**
(China) Yan Bingtao	1
(Scotland) Scott Donaldson	3
**(Scotland) John Higgins**	**5**

**Quarter-finals**; Best of 9 frames
(England) Martin O'Donnell	1
**(China) Lyu Haotian**	**5**
(England) Judd Trump	3
**(Scotland) John Higgins**	**5**

**Semi-finals**; Best of 11 frames
(China) Lyu Haotian	3
**(Scotland) John Higgins**	**6**

=== Bottom half ===
**Last 64**; Best of 9 frames
**(England) Mark Selby**	**5**
(Thailand) Sunny Akani	3
(England) Robert Milkins	3
**(China) Chang Bingyu**	**5**
**(Wales) Ryan Day**	**5**
(England) Mike Dunn	1
(England) David Gilbert	3
**(Iran) Hossein Vafaei**	**5**
(England) Sam Craigie	3
**(England) Mark King**	**5**
(England) Matthew Selt	1
**(Northern Ireland) Mark Allen**	**5**
(Switzerland) Alexander Ursenbacher	2
**(China) Yuan Sijun**	**5**
(Wales) Daniel Wells	1
**(China) Ding Junhui**	**5**
**(England) Barry Hawkins**	**5**
(England) Ashley Carty	3
(China) Xu Si	2
**(Thailand) Noppon Saengkham**	**5**
**(Australia) Neil Robertson**	**5**
(Northern Ireland) Gerard Greene	2
**(Scotland) Graeme Dott**	**5**
(England) Stuart Carrington	4
**(Republic of Ireland) Fergal O'Brien**	**5**
(England) Ali Carter	1
**(China) Zhao Xintong**	**5**
(Scotland) Anthony McGill	4
**(England) Gary Wilson**	**5**
(China) Luo Honghao	2
(Republic of Ireland) Ken Doherty	0
**(Wales) Mark Williams**	**5**

**Last 32**; Best of 9 frames
**(England) Mark Selby**	**5**
(China) Chang Bingyu	1
(Wales) Ryan Day	3
**(Iran) Hossein Vafaei**	**5**
**(England) Mark King**	**5**
(Northern Ireland) Mark Allen	1
**(China) Yuan Sijun**	**5**
(China) Ding Junhui	4
**(England) Barry Hawkins**	**5**
(Thailand) Noppon Saengkham	4
(Australia) Neil Robertson	2
**(Scotland) Graeme Dott**	**5**
(Republic of Ireland) Fergal O'Brien	2
**(China) Zhao Xintong**	**5**
(England) Gary Wilson	2
**(Wales) Mark Williams**	**5**

**Last 16**; Best of 9 frames
**(England) Mark Selby**	**5**
(Iran) Hossein Vafaei	3
(England) Mark King	3
**(China) Yuan Sijun**	**5**
**(England) Barry Hawkins**	**5**
(Scotland) Graeme Dott	2
**(China) Zhao Xintong**	**5**
(Wales) Mark Williams	3

**Quarter-finals**; Best of 9 frames
**(England) Mark Selby**	**5**
(China) Yuan Sijun	2
(England) Barry Hawkins	4
**(China) Zhao Xintong**	**5**

**Semi-finals**; Best of 11 frames
**(England) Mark Selby**	**6**
(China) Zhao Xintong	4

=== Final ===
Final: Best of 19 frames. Referee: Zhu Ying. Guangzhou Tianhe Sports Centre, Guangzhou, China, 30 September 2018.
John Higgins; Scotland	9–**10**	**Mark Selby**; England
Afternoon: **65**–17, 6–**83**, 21–**60**, 0–**70**, **75**–7, **58**–1, **67**–5, 0–**119** (118), **85**–14; Evening: 4–**70**, **71**–39, 25–**66**, 26–**77**, **65**–38, **86**–34, 49–**86**, **68**–60, 52–**74**, 12–**72**
85	Highest break	**118**
0	Century breaks	**1**

== Qualifying ==
These matches were held between 19 and 22 August 2018 at the Preston Guild Hall in Preston, England. All matches were best of 9 frames.

(Belgium) Luca Brecel	5–1 (Note: Match held over and played in Guangzhou.)	(England) Joe O'Connor
(England) Martin O'Donnell	5–3	(England) Elliot Slessor
(England) Tom Ford	5–0	(England) Paul Davison
(England) Michael Holt	3–5	(England) Nigel Bond
(Hong Kong) Marco Fu	5–2	(England) Sam Baird
(England) Andrew Higginson	3–5	(China) Zhang Anda
(China) Liang Wenbo	5–4	(England) Alfie Burden
(Cyprus) Michael Georgiou	4–5	(England) John Astley
(England) Mark Joyce	5–1	(Thailand) James Wattana
(England) Joe Perry	5–2	(England) Ashley Hugill
(China) Lyu Haotian	5–4	(China) Li Yuan
(England) Kyren Wilson	5–1	(Germany) Lukas Kleckers
(England) Mark Davis	5–1	(Pakistan) Hamza Akbar
(China) Xiao Guodong	5–1	(China) Zhang Yong
(England) Liam Highfield	5–2	(England) Hammad Miah
(England) Shaun Murphy	5–2	(Northern Ireland) Jordan Brown
(England) Judd Trump	5–3	(Scotland) Eden Sharav
(Thailand) Thepchaiya Un-Nooh	4–5	(Scotland) Rhys Clark
(England) Anthony Hamilton	5–0	(Iran) Soheil Vahedi
(Wales) Jamie Jones	5–2	(Poland) Adam Stefanow
(England) Stuart Bingham	5–4	(England) Craig Steadman
(England) Peter Ebdon	5–3	(England) Harvey Chandler
(China) Yan Bingtao	5–3	(China) Niu Zhuang
(England) Chris Wakelin	5–4	(Malaysia) Thor Chuan Leong
(Norway) Kurt Maflin	5–1	(England) Sanderson Lam
(England) Jack Lisowski	5–4	(England) Ian Burns
(Scotland) Scott Donaldson	5–0	(Egypt) Basem Eltahhan
(Scotland) Stephen Maguire	5–1	(China) Chen Feilong
(China) Li Hang	2–5	(China) Mei Xiwen
(Wales) Michael White	5–3	(England) Oliver Lines
(Scotland) Alan McManus	1–5	(England) Allan Taylor
(Scotland) John Higgins	5–1	(Wales) Duane Jones
(England) Mark Selby	5–2	(England) Jimmy White
(Thailand) Sunny Akani	5–2	(Finland) Robin Hull
(England) Robert Milkins	5–2	(Scotland) Chris Totten
(England) Jimmy Robertson	3–5	(China) Chang Bingyu
(Wales) Ryan Day	5–2	(Wales) Jak Jones
(England) Mike Dunn	5–1	(China) Luo Zetao
(England) David Gilbert	5–0	(Wales) Kishan Hirani
(Iran) Hossein Vafaei	5–2	(China) Chen Zifan
(Wales) Dominic Dale	2–5	(England) Sam Craigie
(England) Mark King	5–1	(China) Zhang Jiankang
(England) Matthew Selt	5–2	(Wales) Jamie Clarke
(Northern Ireland) Mark Allen	5–2	(England) Sean O'Sullivan
(England) Ben Woollaston	0–5	(Switzerland) Alexander Ursenbacher
(England) Ricky Walden	2–5	(China) Yuan Sijun
(Wales) Daniel Wells	5–4	(England) Billy Joe Castle
(China) Ding Junhui	5–3	(Wales) Lee Walker
(England) Barry Hawkins	5–0	(Germany) Simon Lichtenberg
(England) Rory McLeod	3–5	(England) Ashley Carty
(England) Martin Gould	4–5	(China) Xu Si
(Thailand) Noppon Saengkham	5–1	(China) Lu Ning
(Australia) Neil Robertson	5–3	(Scotland) Ross Muir
(England) Robbie Williams	0–5	(Northern Ireland) Gerard Greene
(Scotland) Graeme Dott	5–2	(China) Bai Langning
(England) Stuart Carrington	5–3	(China) He Guoqiang
(Republic of Ireland) Fergal O'Brien	5–2	(England) Peter Lines
(England) Ali Carter	5–1	(Hong Kong) Andy Lee
(Wales) Matthew Stevens	3–5	(China) Zhao Xintong
(Scotland) Anthony McGill	5–3	(Northern Ireland) Joe Swail
(England) Gary Wilson	5–3	(China) Fan Zhengyi
(China) Zhou Yuelong	1–5	(China) Luo Honghao
(Republic of Ireland) Ken Doherty	5–3	(China) Tian Pengfei
(Wales) Mark Williams	5–0	(England) Rod Lawler

== Century breaks ==
=== Main stage centuries ===
Total: 29

- 144 – Ali Carter
- 136, 108 – Mark Williams
- 131 – Anthony Hamilton
- 128, 111 – Yan Bingtao
- 127 – Jamie Jones
- 126 – Graeme Dott
- 125 – Ding Junhui
- 124, 102 – Lyu Haotian
- 121 – Fergal O'Brien
- 120 – Neil Robertson
- 118, 108, 100 – Mark Selby
- 117 – Peter Ebdon
- 113 – Stuart Bingham
- 111, 102 – Judd Trump
- 110 – Luo Honghao
- 110 – Zhao Xintong
- 108 – Shaun Murphy
- 108 – Yuan Sijun
- 108 – Hossein Vafaei
- 105 – Scott Donaldson
- 103 – Liang Wenbo
- 101 – Mark Allen
- 100 – Ryan Day

=== Qualifying stage centuries ===
Total: 31

- 138 – Joe Perry
- 135 – Liam Highfield
- 135 – Martin Gould
- 131 – Jak Jones
- 124, 103 – Mark Allen
- 123, 109 – Ryan Day
- 123 – Shaun Murphy
- 122 – David Gilbert
- 121 – Peter Ebdon
- 118 – Mark Selby
- 117, 114 – Stephen Maguire
- 117 – Graeme Dott
- 115 – Liang Wenbo
- 114 – Billy Joe Castle
- 112 – Tian Pengfei
- 109 – John Higgins
- 109 – Zhang Anda
- 106, 101 – Chen Zifan
- 106 – Tom Ford
- 106 – Niu Zhuang
- 105 – Jamie Jones
- 103 – Stuart Carrington
- 102 – Noppon Saengkham
- 102 – Mark Williams
- 101 – Marco Fu
- 101 – Neil Robertson
- 100 – Jimmy Robertson
