= Martin O'Donnell (snooker player) =

English snooker player (born 1986)

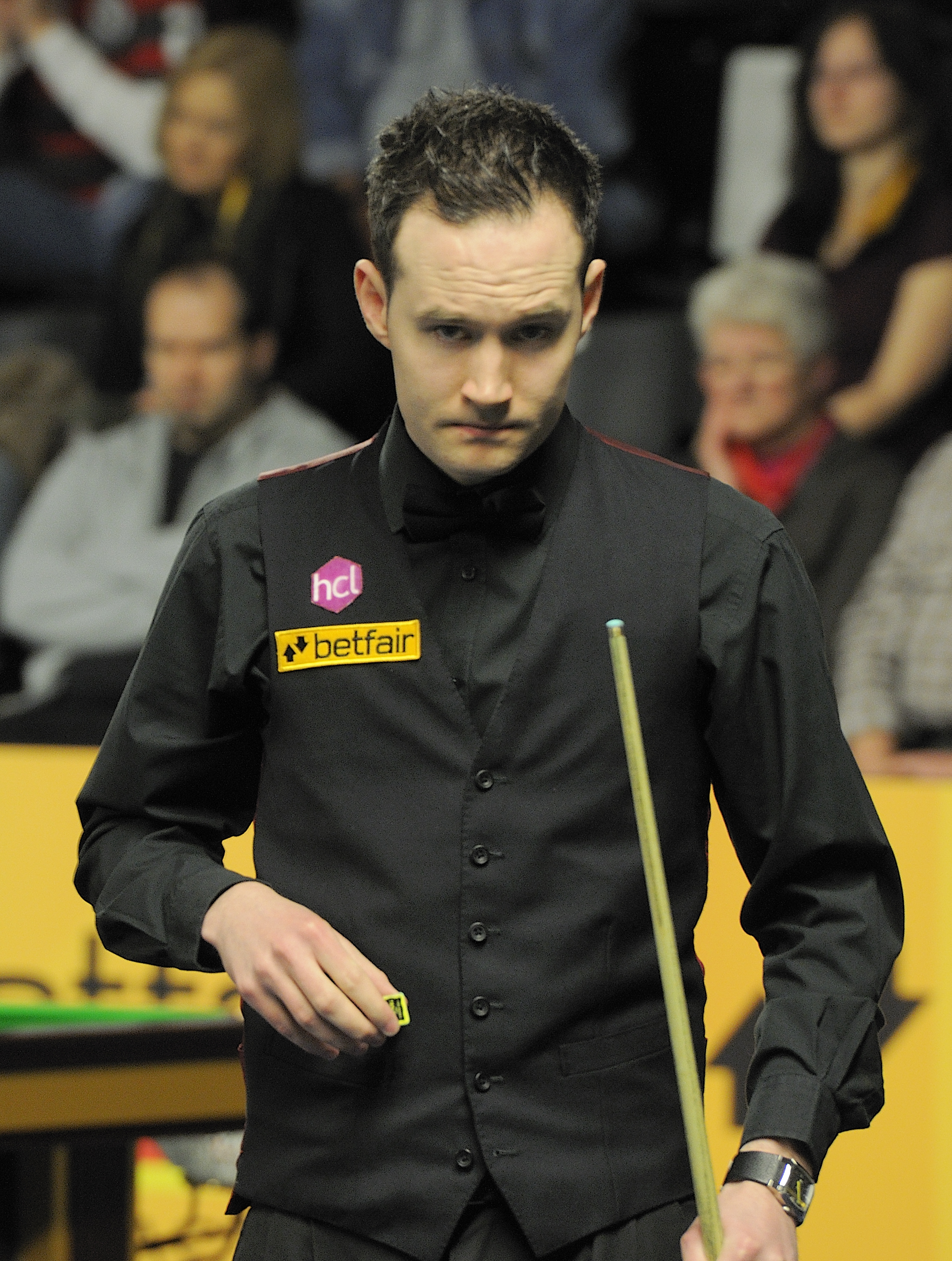
- O'Donnell at the 2013 German Masters

Personal information
- Nickname: The Minister of Defence
- Born: 4 June 1986 (age 40) England

Sport
- Country: England
- Sport: Snooker
- Professional: 2012–2014, 2015–2022, 2023–present
- Highest ranking: 30 (October 2020)
- Current ranking: 57 (as of 7 November 2026)
- Best ranking finish: Runner-up (2024 Welsh Open)

Martin O'Donnell (born 4 June 1986) is an English professional snooker player. He gained a two-year place on the main snooker tour by coming through the 2012 Q School. He finished with the most points during the Q Tour of the 2022–23 season and gained a two-year tour card as a result. He is known as "The Minister of Defence" because his initials spell out "MoD", in what is jocularly taken as a reference to the UK government body responsible for the Armed Forces.

== Career ==
=== Early career ===
As an amateur, O'Donnell played in all 12 of the Players Tour Championship events during the 2010/2011 season. He reached the second round on three occasions, but could not progress any further; however, in Event 3 he defeated former world champion Shaun Murphy 4–3. O'Donnell finished 109th on the Order of Merit. He entered the 2011 Q School in an attempt to turn professional and in the final event he was one match away from achieving this. He played Kurt Maflin and lost 1–4.

In the 2011/2012 season, O'Donnell was again confined to entering the PTC events, playing 9 of the 12. He reached the main draw on six occasions but failed to win a match once there. He won the SnookerBacker Classic, which guaranteed him entry into Q School at the end of the season. O'Donnell won five matches at the first 2012 Q School event, concluding with a 4–1 victory over Adrian Ridley, to secure a two-year tour card beginning with the 2012/2013 season.

=== Professional debut ===
O'Donnell's first match as a professional was in qualifying for the Wuxi Classic. He beat David Grace 5–2, before losing to Alfie Burden 3–5. He went one better in qualifying for the next ranking event, the Australian Goldfields Open, by defeating Jeff Cundy and Grace once more, but was then whitewashed 0–5 by David Gilbert. He did not win two consecutive matches in qualifying for any other event this season.

O'Donnell played in all ten minor-ranking Players Tour Championship events and did not win a match in any of them, until his final attempt at the European Tour Event 5 in Scotland. He saw off Sean O'Sullivan, Craig Steadman, Kurt Maflin all by 4–3 scorelines to reach the quarter-finals, but his run was ended as Andrew Higginson advanced with a 4–2 win. This helped O'Donnell to finish 83rd on the PTC Order of Merit. His season ended when he was beaten 5–10 by Tian Pengfei in the first round of World Championship Qualifying. O'Donnell finished his first year on the tour ranked at world number 86.

=== 2013/2014 season ===
O'Donnell was beaten in the qualifying rounds for eight ranking events in the 2013/2014 season. All 128 players on the tour entered the UK Championship and Welsh Open at the first round stage, with O'Donnell losing at this stage in both. The only event he qualified for this season was the China Open by defeating David Gilbert 5–1. He received a bye through the first round due to Stuart Bingham's withdrawal which meant he would play in the last 32 of a ranking event for the first time. O'Donnell faced Craig Steadman and was edged out 5–4. In the European Tour events his best result came at the Rotterdam Open where he beat experienced players Robert Milkins and Marcus Campbell, before losing 4–0 to Stuart Bingham in the last 16. As he ended his second season at world number 92, outside the top 64 in the rankings, his other route to remain on tour next year was through the European Order of Merit, with eight places available to non-qualified players. O'Donnell finished 59th, less than 300 points short of Tony Drago who received the final spot and entered the 2014 Q School to retain his professional status. He was eliminated in the last 64 in both events and had amateur status for the coming season.

=== 2014/2015 season ===
O'Donnell qualified for the first round of three of the six European Tour events during the 2014/2015 season. His only win came at the first event, the Riga Open where he defeated Alfie Burden 4–2, but then lost 4–1 to Mark Williams in the second round. At the end of the season he won his place back on the tour by coming through three matches at the EBSA Play-offs, culminating with a 4–3 victory over Jamie Clarke.

=== 2015/2016 season ===
O'Donnell overcame Gerard Greene 6–4 to qualify for the International Championship and lost 6–2 to Neil Robertson in the first round. In the first round of the Welsh Open he knocked out Stephen Maguire, making a 130 break along the way, but was then defeated 4–2 by Matthew Stevens. O'Donnell beat another multiple ranking event winner when he recovered from 3–1 down to Mark Williams to triumph 5–3 and qualify for the China Open. He then ousted Joe Swail 5–2 and Matthew Selt 5–1 to reach the last 16 of a ranking event for the first time, but he was thrashed 5–0 by Mark King.

=== 2016/2017 season ===
O'Donnell qualified for the Riga Masters and beat Sam Craigie 4–3, before losing 4–3 to Jimmy Robertson. He had to wait until the penultimate event of the year to reach the last 32 again as he qualified for the China Open by edging past Thepchaiya Un-Nooh 5–4 and thrashed Jimmy Robertson 5–0. O'Donnell would be defeated 5–1 by Mark Selby and played in the 2017 Q School as he was ranked 74th in the world, outside the top 64 who kept their places. He lost 4–1 to Lukas Kleckers in the last round of the first event and 4–3 to Ashley Carty in the third round of the second, but took the final place through the Q School Order of Merit to earn a new two-year tour card.

== Performance and rankings timeline ==
Tournament	2004/ 05	2010/ 11	2011/ 12	2012/ 13	2013/ 14	2014/ 15	2015/ 16	2016/ 17	2017/ 18	2018/ 19	2019/ 20	2020/ 21	2021/ 22	2022/ 23	2023/ 24	2024/ 25	2025/ 26	2026/ 27
Ranking (Note: It shows the ranking at the beginning of the season)	(Note: He was an amateur)			(Note: New players on the Main Tour don't have a ranking)	86			77	(Note: Players qualified through Q School started the season without prize money ranking points)	67	42	34	48			63	43	52
Ranking tournaments
Championship League	NH	Non-Ranking Event										RR	RR	A	2R	3R	RR	RR
China Open	A	A	A	LQ	2R	A	3R	2R	1R	LQ	Tournament Not Held							LQ
Wuhan Open	Tournament Not Held														2R	2R	LQ	LQ
British Open	A	Tournament Not Held											2R	A	LQ	1R	2R	LQ
English Open	Tournament Not Held							1R	1R	1R	2R	2R	1R	A	QF	LQ	1R	LQ
Shenzhen Open (Note: The event was called the Xi'an Grand Prix (2024/2025–2025/2026))	Tournament Not Held															LQ	LQ	LQ
Northern Ireland Open	Tournament Not Held							1R	WD	4R	2R	1R	1R	A	2R	3R	2R	3R
International Championship	Not Held			LQ	LQ	A	1R	A	3R	QF	LQ	Not Held			LQ	1R	1R	
UK Championship	A	A	A	LQ	1R	A	1R	1R	1R	QF	3R	1R	2R	LQ	LQ	LQ	LQ	
Shoot Out	Non-Ranking Event							1R	SF	1R	2R	QF	1R	A	1R	QF	1R	
Scottish Open	Not Held			MR	Not Held			1R	1R	2R	2R	3R	3R	A	3R	LQ	LQ	
German Masters	NH	A	A	LQ	LQ	A	LQ	LQ	LQ	LQ	LQ	LQ	LQ	A	1R	LQ	LQ	
Welsh Open	A	A	A	LQ	1R	A	2R	1R	1R	3R	3R	3R	LQ	A	F	LQ	2R	
World Grand Prix	Tournament Not Held					NR	DNQ	DNQ	DNQ	1R	DNQ	DNQ	DNQ	DNQ	DNQ	DNQ	DNQ	
Players Championship (Note: The event was called the Players Tour Championship Grand Final (2010/2011-2015/2016))	NH	DNQ	DNQ	DNQ	DNQ	DNQ	DNQ	DNQ	DNQ	DNQ	DNQ	DNQ	DNQ	DNQ	DNQ	DNQ	DNQ	
World Open (Note: The event was called the Grand Prix (2004/2005))	A	A	A	LQ	LQ	Not held		LQ	LQ	1R	2R	Not Held			LQ	1R	2R	
Tour Championship	Tournament Not Held									DNQ	DNQ	DNQ	DNQ	DNQ	DNQ	DNQ	DNQ	
World Championship	LQ	A	A	LQ	LQ	A	LQ	LQ	LQ	LQ	LQ	LQ	LQ	LQ	LQ	LQ	LQ	
Non-ranking tournaments
Championship League	NH	A	A	A	A	A	A	A	A	A	RR	A	A	A	A	A	A	
Former ranking tournaments
Wuxi Classic	NH	Non-Ranking		LQ	LQ	A	Tournament Not Held											
Australian Goldfields Open	Not Held		A	LQ	LQ	LQ	LQ	Tournament Not Held										
Shanghai Masters	NH	A	A	LQ	LQ	A	LQ	LQ	LQ	Non-Ranking		Not Held			Non-Ranking Event			
Paul Hunter Classic	PA	Minor-Ranking Event						1R	2R	1R	NR	Tournament Not Held						
Indian Open	Tournament Not Held				LQ	A	NH	1R	2R	LQ	Tournament Not Held							
Riga Masters (Note: The event was called the Riga Open (2014/2015–2015/2016))	Tournament Not Held					Minor-Rank		2R	LQ	LQ	LQ	Tournament Not Held						
China Championship	Tournament Not Held							NR	LQ	QF	1R	Tournament Not Held						
WST Pro Series	Tournament Not Held											2R	Tournament Not Held					
Turkish Masters	Tournament Not Held												1R	Tournament Not Held				
Gibraltar Open	Tournament Not Held						MR	2R	3R	1R	3R	1R	1R	Tournament Not Held				
European Masters (Note: The event was called the Malta Cup (2004/2005))	A	Tournament Not Held						A	2R	LQ	LQ	3R	LQ	A	LQ	Not Held		
Saudi Arabia Masters	Tournament Not Held															4R	5R	NH
Former non-ranking tournaments
Haining Open	Tournament Not Held					Minor-Rank		3R	A	A	A	NH	A	A	Tournament Not Held			

Performance Table Legend
LQ	lost in the qualifying draw	#R	lost in the early rounds of the tournament (WR = Wildcard round, RR = Round robin)	QF	lost in the quarter-finals
SF	lost in the semi-finals	F	lost in the final	W	won the tournament
DNQ	did not qualify for the tournament	A	did not participate in the tournament	WD	withdrew from the tournament

NH / Not Held	means an event was not held.
NR / Non-Ranking Event	means an event is/was no longer a ranking event.
R / Ranking Event	means an event is/was a ranking event.
MR / Minor-Ranking Event	means an event is/was a minor-ranking event.

== Career finals ==
=== Ranking finals: 1 ===
Outcome	No.	Year	Championship	Opponent in the final	Score
Runner-up	1.	2024	Welsh Open	(England) Gary Wilson	4–9

=== Pro-am finals: 1 (1 title) ===
Outcome	No.	Year	Championship	Opponent in the final	Score
Winner	1.	2017	Italian Snooker Open	(Switzerland) Alexander Ursenbacher	3–2

=== Amateur finals: 8 (4 titles) ===
Outcome	No.	Year	Championship	Opponent in the final	Score
Runner-up	1.	2006	English Amateur Championship	(England) Mark Joyce	3–8
Runner-up	2.	2012	English Amateur Championship (2)	(England) Gary Wilson	9–10
Winner	3.	2012	Snookerbacker Classic – Grand Finals	(Republic of Ireland) John Sutton	4–0
Winner	4.	2022	Q Tour – Event 2	(England) George Pragnell	5–1
Runner-up	5.	2022	Snooker Legends – The 900	(England) Ant Parsons	0–1
Winner	7	2022	Q Tour – Event 6	(Scotland) Ross Muir	5–1
Winner	8	2023	Snookerz Christmas Cracker	(England) Paul Ganley	3–1
