= Darryl Hill (snooker player) =

British snooker player

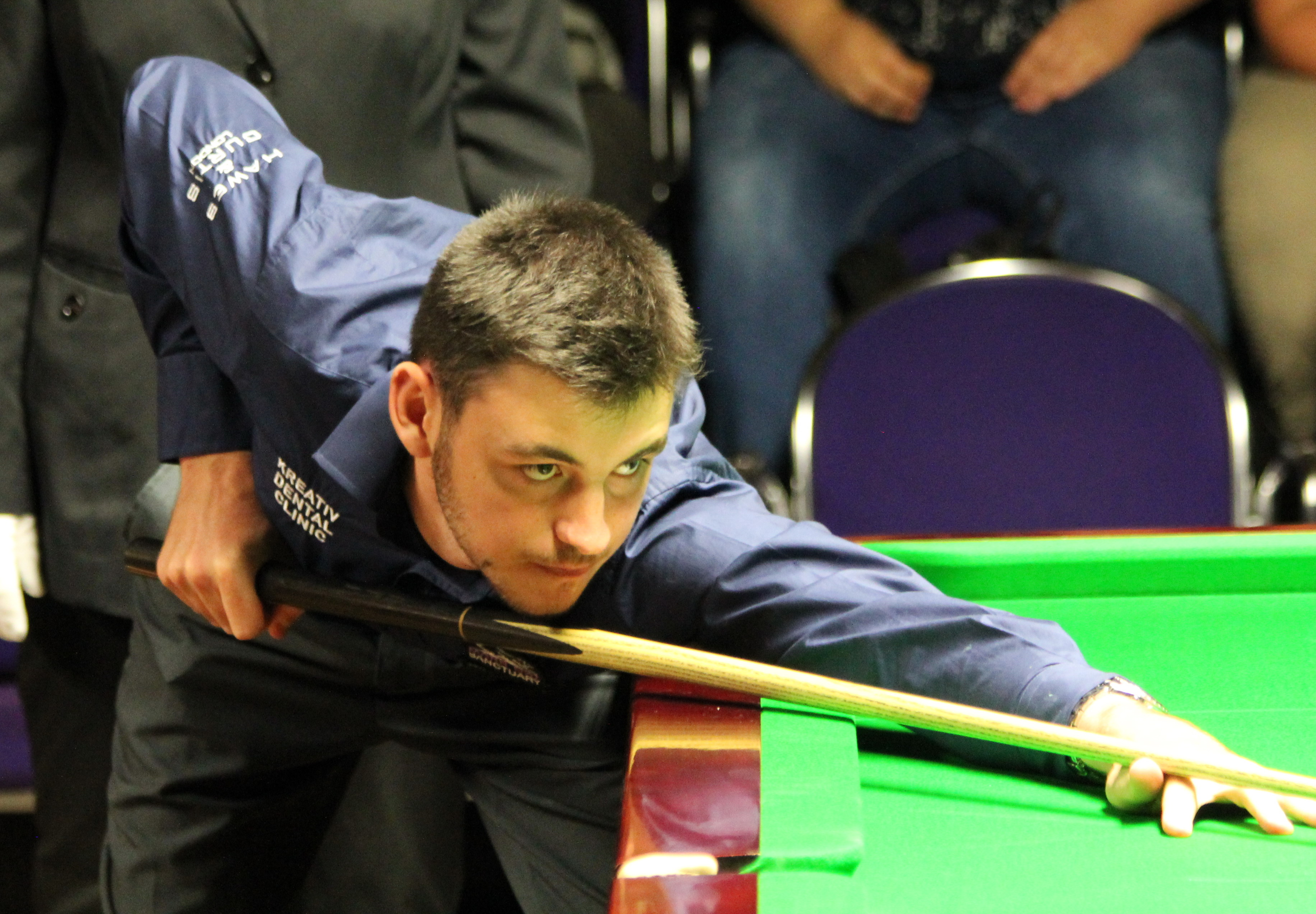
- Paul Hunter Classic 2015

Personal information
- Born: 30 April 1996 (age 30) Leeds, Yorkshire

Sport
- Country: Isle of Man
- Sport: Snooker
- Professional: 2015–2017
- Highest ranking: 75 (June–July 2016)
- Best ranking finish: Last 32 (x2)

Darryl Hill (born 30 April 1996 in Leeds, Yorkshire) is an English-born Manx former professional snooker player.

== Career ==
In 2014, Hill entered the EBSA European Under-21 Snooker Championships as the number one ranked entrant, but lost in the third round to Ashley Carty. The following year, Hill made it to the final, where he defeated Louis Heathcote 6–3 to win the 2015 EBSA European Under-21 Snooker Championships; as a result, he was given a two-year card on the professional World Snooker Tour for the 2015–16 and 2016–17 seasons.

Hill beat Robert Milkins 6–4 to qualify for the 2015 International Championship. On his debut at the main stage of a ranking event, he was defeated 6–2 by Jimmy Robertson. He played at the UK Championship and Welsh Open for the first time, losing 6–3 to Thepchaiya Un-Nooh in the former and 4–1 to Graeme Dott in the latter. Hill received a bye in the first round of the China Open, due to Mark Selby withdrawing, and won a second-round ranking event match for the first time by beating James Wattana 5–3, before losing by a reversal of this scoreline to Dominic Dale. At the end of the season, Hill was awarded the World Snooker Rookie of the Year award.

Hill lost his first 12 matches of the 2016–17 season, which included a 4–5 loss to Ronnie O'Sullivan having led the match 2-0 and 4–3 in the German Masters, before finally picking up a win in February at the Welsh Open as he beat Dechawat Poomjaeng 4–1. He lost 4–1 to Ali Carter in the next round. Hill was eliminated in the third round of the Shoot-Out by Li Hang and dropped off the tour at the end of the season, after he only won one match in the two Q School events.

On the Isle of Man, Hill was named the 2015 Under 21 Sportsman of the Year at the Isle of Man Sports Awards Ceremony and in 2017, he became the first snooker player to be inducted into the Manx Sporting Hall of Fame.

== Personal life ==
Hill has worked at the Mann Cat Sanctuary since the age of nine to the present day. Hill is also a keen musician and has commercially released his own music.

During Hill's second year on the professional snooker tour he was plagued with health problems and was diagnosed with ulcerative colitis, a form of inflammatory bowel disease. At the end of the season he took some time out from the game to concentrate on his health. He has since returned to compete in World and European amateur events.

In the summer of 2020, he opened his own cuesports centre on the Isle of Man, named The Cue Zone IOM.

== Performance and rankings timeline ==
Tournament	2011/ 12	2012/ 13	2013/ 14	2014/ 15	2015/ 16	2016/ 17
Ranking (Note: It shows the ranking at the beginning of the season.)	(Note: He was an amateur.)				(Note: New players on the Main Tour don't have a ranking.)	92
Ranking tournaments
Riga Masters (Note: The event was called the Riga Open (2014/2015–2015/2016))	Not Held			Minor-Rank.		LQ
Indian Open	Not Held		A	LQ	NH	LQ
World Open	A	A	A	Not Held		LQ
Paul Hunter Classic	Minor-Ranking Event					WD
Shanghai Masters	A	A	A	A	LQ	LQ
European Masters	Tournament Not Held					LQ
English Open	Tournament Not Held					1R
International Championship	NH	A	LQ	A	1R	LQ
Northern Ireland Open	Tournament Not Held					1R
UK Championship	A	A	A	A	1R	1R
Scottish Open	NH	MR	Tournament Not Held			1R
German Masters	A	A	A	A	LQ	LQ
World Grand Prix	Not Held			NR	DNQ	DNQ
Welsh Open	A	A	A	A	1R	2R
Shoot-Out	Non-Ranking Event					3R
Gibraltar Open	Tournament Not Held				MR	1R
Players Championship (Note: The event was called the Players Tour Championship Grand Finals (2011/2012–2012/2013))	DNQ	DNQ	DNQ	DNQ	DNQ	DNQ
China Open	A	A	A	A	2R	LQ
World Championship	A	A	A	LQ	LQ	LQ
Former ranking tournaments
Wuxi Classic	NR	A	LQ	A	Not Held	
Australian Goldfields Open	A	A	LQ	LQ	LQ	NH

Performance Table Legend
LQ	lost in the qualifying draw	#R	lost in the early rounds of the tournament (WR = Wildcard round, RR = Round robin)	QF	lost in the quarter-finals
SF	lost in the semi-finals	F	lost in the final	W	won the tournament
DNQ	did not qualify for the tournament	A	did not participate in the tournament	WD	withdrew from the tournament

NH / Not Held	means an event was not held.
NR / Non-Ranking Event	means an event is/was no longer a ranking event.
R / Ranking Event	means an event is/was a ranking event.
MR / Minor-Ranking Event	means an event is/was a minor-ranking event.

== Career finals ==
=== Amateur finals: 6 (4 titles) ===
Outcome	No.	Year	Championship	Opponent in the final	Score
Winner	1.	2010	Isle of Man Amateur Championship	(Isle of Man) Tom Miller	5–4
Winner	2.	2015	European Under-21 Snooker Championship	(England) Louis Heathcote	6–3
Winner	3.	2018	Isle of Man Amateur Championship	(Isle of Man) John Kennish	5–3
Runner-up	1.	2019	Isle of Man Amateur Championship	(Isle of Man) John Kennish	4–5
Winner	4.	2020	Isle of Man Amateur Championship	(Isle of Man) John Kennish	5–3
Runner-up	2.	2022	Isle of Man Amateur Championship	(Isle of Man) John Kennish	0–6
