= 2015 International Championship =

Tournament information
- Dates: 25 October – 1 November 2015
- Venue: Baihu Media Broadcasting Centre
- City: Daqing
- Country: China
- Organisation: World Snooker
- Format: Ranking event
- Total prize fund: £657,000
- Winner's share: £125,000
- Highest break: Zhao Xintong (CHN) (142)

Final
- Champion: John Higgins (SCO)
- Runner-up: David Gilbert (ENG)
- Score: 10–5

The 2015 International Championship was a professional ranking snooker tournament that took place between 25 October and 1 November 2015 at the Baihu Media Broadcasting Centre in Daqing, China. It was the third ranking event of the 2015/2016 season.

Ricky Walden was the defending champion, but he lost 4–6 against Tian Pengfei in the qualifying round.

John Higgins won his 28th ranking title, defeating David Gilbert 10–5 in the final.

== Prize fund ==
The breakdown of prize money for this year is shown below:

- Winner: £125,000
- Runner-up: £65,000
- Semi-final: £30,000
- Quarter-final: £17,500
- Last 16: £12,000
- Last 32: £7,000
- Last 64: £4,000
- Televised highest break: £1,000
- Total: £657,000

== Wildcard round ==
These matches were played on 25 October 2015.

Match		Score	
WC1	Noppon Saengkham (THA)	6–5	Lin Shuai (CHN)
WC2	Daniel Wells (WAL)	6–2	Fang Xiongman (CHN)
WC3	Ken Doherty (IRL)	6–2	Chen Zifan (CHN)
WC4	Aditya Mehta (IND)	4–6	Wang Yuchen (CHN)

== Main draw ==
Last 64; Best of 11 frames
(China) Tian Pengfei	6
(China) Cao Yupeng	2
(England) Andrew Higginson	4
(China) Liang Wenbo	6
(England) Kyren Wilson	6
(England) Jamie Cope	4
(Northern Ireland) Joe Swail	4
(Northern Ireland) Mark Allen	6
(Wales) Mark Williams	6
(England) Ian Burns	3
(Thailand) Thepchaiya Un-Nooh	6
(Scotland) Ross Muir	5
(England) Martin Gould	2
(China) Zhou Yuelong	6
(England) Sanderson Lam	6
(England) Michael Wild	0
(England) Barry Hawkins	6
(England) Chris Wakelin	4
(England) Jimmy Robertson	6
(Isle of Man) Darryl Hill	2
(England) Ali Carter	5
(England) Jack Lisowski	6
(Wales) Matthew Stevens	2
(Hong Kong) Marco Fu	6
(Thailand) Noppon Saengkham	4
(England) Oliver Lines	6
(England) David Gilbert	6
(China) Xiao Guodong	5
(Wales) Ryan Day	6
(England) Mark Joyce	3
(England) Craig Steadman	2
(China) Ding Junhui	6
(England) Mark Selby	6
(England) Mike Dunn	3
(England) Sean O'Sullivan	0
(Scotland) Anthony McGill	6
(Wales) Lee Walker	6
(Wales) Daniel Wells	4
(Thailand) Dechawat Poomjaeng	5
(Wales) Michael White	6
(Scotland) Graeme Dott	6
(Scotland) Jamie Burnett	2
(Republic of Ireland) Ken Doherty	0
(England) Peter Ebdon	6
(Republic of Ireland) Fergal O'Brien	6
(England) Tom Ford	3
(England) Martin O'Donnell	2
(Australia) Neil Robertson	6
(England) Shaun Murphy	6
(Belgium) Luca Brecel	2
(Norway) Kurt Maflin	2
(Wales) Jamie Jones	6
(England) Michael Holt	6
(England) Rod Lawler	4
(China) Zhao Xintong	2
(Scotland) John Higgins	6
(England) Joe Perry	6
(China) Wang Yuchen	1
(Wales) Dominic Dale	6
(England) Matthew Selt	1
(England) Ben Woollaston	6
(England) Robbie Williams	5
(China) Yu Delu	6
(England) Stuart Bingham	2

Last 32; Best of 11 frames
(China) Tian Pengfei	6
(China) Liang Wenbo	3
(England) Kyren Wilson	3
(Northern Ireland) Mark Allen	6
(Wales) Mark Williams	5
(Thailand) Thepchaiya Un-Nooh	6
(China) Zhou Yuelong	6
(England) Sanderson Lam	0
(England) Barry Hawkins	4
(England) Jimmy Robertson	6
(England) Jack Lisowski	3
(Hong Kong) Marco Fu	6
(England) Oliver Lines	4
(England) David Gilbert	6
(Wales) Ryan Day	6
(China) Ding Junhui	5
(England) Mark Selby	6
(Scotland) Anthony McGill	1
(Wales) Lee Walker	3
(Wales) Michael White	6
(Scotland) Graeme Dott	6
(England) Peter Ebdon	3
(Republic of Ireland) Fergal O'Brien	3
(Australia) Neil Robertson	6
(England) Shaun Murphy	6
(Wales) Jamie Jones	2
(England) Michael Holt	3
(Scotland) John Higgins	6
(England) Joe Perry	6
(Wales) Dominic Dale	3
(England) Ben Woollaston	6
(China) Yu Delu	5

Last 16; Best of 11 frames
(China) Tian Pengfei	1
(Northern Ireland) Mark Allen	6
(Thailand) Thepchaiya Un-Nooh	6
(China) Zhou Yuelong	5
(England) Jimmy Robertson	3
(Hong Kong) Marco Fu	6
(England) David Gilbert	6
(Wales) Ryan Day	4
(England) Mark Selby	6
(Wales) Michael White	3
(Scotland) Graeme Dott	1
(Australia) Neil Robertson	6
(England) Shaun Murphy	0
(Scotland) John Higgins	6
(England) Joe Perry	6
(England) Ben Woollaston	5

Quarter-finals; Best of 11 frames
(Northern Ireland) Mark Allen	5
(Thailand) Thepchaiya Un-Nooh	6
(Hong Kong) Marco Fu	5
(England) David Gilbert	6
(England) Mark Selby	6
(Australia) Neil Robertson	4
(Scotland) John Higgins	6
(England) Joe Perry	3

Semi-finals; Best of 17 frames
(Thailand) Thepchaiya Un-Nooh	5
(England) David Gilbert	9
(England) Mark Selby	4
(Scotland) John Higgins	9

Final; Best of 19 frames
(England) David Gilbert	5
(Scotland) John Higgins	10

== Final ==
Final: Best of 19 frames. Referee: Jan Verhaas. Baihu Media Broadcasting Centre, Daqing, China, 1 November 2015.
David Gilbert; England	5–10	John Higgins; Scotland
Afternoon: 64–53, 33–71 (56), 100–0 (100), 2–82 (66), 9–93 (69), 43–66, 83–9 (77), 75–0 (59), 0–108 (108); Evening: 8–135 (129), 0–88 (88), 98–4 (51), 54–88 (54, 88), 18–72 (52), 22–93 (56)
100	Highest break	129
1	Century breaks	2
5	50+ breaks	9

== Qualifying ==
These matches took place between 30 September and 3 October 2015 in Barnsley, England. Matches involved Ricky Walden, Liang Wenbo, Ding Junhui and Stuart Bingham, were played on 25 October 2015 in China. All matches were best of 11 frames.

(England) Ricky Walden	4–6	(China) Tian Pengfei
(China) Cao Yupeng	6–2	(England) Liam Highfield
(England) Andrew Higginson	6–3	(China) Zhang Yong
(China) Liang Wenbo	6–3	(Wales) Alex Taubman
(England) Kyren Wilson	6–1	(Malaysia) Thor Chuan Leong
(England) Anthony Hamilton	2–6	(England) Jamie Cope
(Northern Ireland) Joe Swail	6–5	(England) Allan Taylor
(Northern Ireland) Mark Allen	6–5	(Scotland) Scott Donaldson
(Wales) Mark Williams	6–3	(England) Nigel Bond
(England) Mark King	2–6	(England) Ian Burns
(Thailand) Thepchaiya Un-Nooh	6–5	(England) Hammad Miah
(Scotland) Alan McManus	5–6	(Scotland) Ross Muir
(England) Martin Gould	6–4	(Wales) Gareth Allen
(England) Sam Baird	4–6	(China) Zhou Yuelong
(Republic of Ireland) David Morris	3–6	(England) Sanderson Lam
(England) Judd Trump	0–6	(England) Michael Wild
(England) Barry Hawkins	6–0	(Scotland) Rhys Clark
(England) Peter Lines	4–6	(England) Chris Wakelin
(England) Jimmy Robertson	6–1	(China) Lu Ning
(England) Robert Milkins	4–6	(Isle of Man) Darryl Hill
(England) Ali Carter	6–0	(England) Luke Simmonds
(England) Jack Lisowski	6–3	(Iran) Hossein Vafaei Ayouri
(Wales) Matthew Stevens	6–0	(Scotland) Fraser Patrick
(Hong Kong) Marco Fu	6–2	(England) Paul Davison
(Scotland) Stephen Maguire	2–6	(Thailand) Noppon Saengkham
(England) Gary Wilson	3–6	(England) Oliver Lines
(England) David Gilbert	6–2	(England) Barry Pinches
(China) Xiao Guodong	6–0	(England) Jason Weston
(Wales) Ryan Day	6–1	(China) Zhang Anda
(England) Mark Joyce	6–2	(Pakistan) Hamza Akbar
(China) Li Hang	2–6	(England) Craig Steadman
(China) Ding Junhui	6–4	(England) Sam Craigie

(England) Mark Selby	6–1	(Scotland) Eden Sharav
(England) Mike Dunn	6–3	(England) Mitchell Mann
(Finland) Robin Hull	3–6	(England) Sean O'Sullivan
(Scotland) Anthony McGill	6–3	(Thailand) James Wattana
(England) Mark Davis	5–6	(Wales) Lee Walker
(England) Rory McLeod	1–6	(Wales) Daniel Wells
(Thailand) Dechawat Poomjaeng	6–4	(England) Michael Georgiou
(Wales) Michael White	6–5	(England) Alfie Burden
(Scotland) Graeme Dott	6–3	(England) Andy Hicks
(Scotland) Jamie Burnett	6–2	(England) James Cahill
(Republic of Ireland) Ken Doherty	6–3	(Australia) Vinnie Calabrese
(England) Peter Ebdon	6–1	(England) Zak Surety
(Republic of Ireland) Fergal O'Brien	6–2	(Egypt) Hatem Yassen
(England) Tom Ford	6–1	(Scotland) Michael Leslie
(Northern Ireland) Gerard Greene	4–6	(England) Martin O'Donnell
(Australia) Neil Robertson	6–3	(England) Kuldesh Johal
(England) Shaun Murphy	6–2	(China) Lü Chenwei
(Belgium) Luca Brecel	6–1	(England) David Grace
(Norway) Kurt Maflin	6–2	(England) Joe O'Connor
(Wales) Jamie Jones	6–4	(Thailand) Thanawat Thirapongpaiboon
(England) Michael Holt	6–1	(England) Jake Nicholson
(England) Rod Lawler	6–3	(England) Jimmy White
(England) Stuart Carrington	0–6	(China) Zhao Xintong
(Scotland) John Higgins	6–1	(England) Ashley Hugill
(England) Joe Perry	6–1	(England) Michael Wasley
(India) Aditya Mehta	6–1	(England) Ian Glover
(Wales) Dominic Dale	6–2	(England) Sydney Wilson
(England) Matthew Selt	6–2	(England) Adam Duffy
(England) Ben Woollaston	6–3	(Republic of Ireland) Leo Fernandez
(England) Robbie Williams	6–2	(England) Joel Walker
(China) Yu Delu	6–1	(England) Chris Melling
(England) Stuart Bingham	6–1	(England) Steven Hallworth

== Century breaks ==
=== Qualifying stage centuries ===
- 142 – Mark Allen
- 136, 111 – Liam Highfield
- 134 – Shaun Murphy
- 133, 106 – Marco Fu
- 133 – Matthew Selt
- 132, 121 – Luca Brecel
- 131 – Ben Woollaston
- 131 – Mark Joyce
- 129, 125 – Jack Lisowski
- 128 – Sanderson Lam
- 122 – Michael Holt
- 120 – Rod Lawler
- 120 – Dechawat Poomjaeng
- 118 – Mark Selby
- 110 – Allan Taylor
- 105 – Adam Duffy
- 105 – Ryan Day
- 104 – Thepchaiya Un-Nooh
- 104 – Peter Ebdon
- 103 – Yu Delu
- 103 – Lee Walker
- 102 – Anthony McGill
- 102 – Cao Yupeng
- 100 – Ali Carter

=== Televised stage centuries ===
- 142 – Zhao Xintong
- 141, 108 – Jimmy Robertson
- 138, 129, 113, 108, 106, 103, 101 – John Higgins
- 138, 115 – Zhou Yuelong
- 138 – Cao Yupeng
- 137, 106, 105, 101, 100 – Marco Fu
- 137 – Ben Woollaston
- 130, 112, 112, 105, 100 – David Gilbert
- 127, 127, 104 – Neil Robertson
- 126, 118, 100 – Mark Allen
- 124 – Xiao Guodong
- 121, 101 – Liang Wenbo
- 121 – Graeme Dott
- 118 – Ross Muir
- 115, 100 – Mark Selby
- 112, 111, 108 – Ryan Day
- 112 – Barry Hawkins
- 110, 106 – Tian Pengfei
- 110 – Dominic Dale
- 110 – Peter Ebdon
- 108 – Fang Xiongman
- 105 – Martin O'Donnell
- 103 – Thepchaiya Un-Nooh
- 100 – Jack Lisowski
- 100 – Fergal O'Brien
- 100 – Sam Craigie
