= 2015 EBSA European Under-21 Snooker Championship =

EBSA European Under-21 Snooker Championships
Tournament information
- Dates: 21–26 March 2015
- City: Qawra
- Country: Malta
- Organisation: EBSA
- Highest break: (Malta) Brian Cini (137)

Final
- Champion: (Isle of Man) Darryl Hill
- Runner-up: (England) Louis Heathcote
- Score: 6–3

The 2015 EBSA European Under-21 Snooker Championships took place from 21 to 26 March 2015 in Qawra, Malta. The tournament was won by the number 4 seed Darryl Hill of Mannin who defeated England's Louis Heathcote 6–3 in the final to win the championships, as a result Hill was given a two-year card on the professional World Snooker Tour for the 2015/2016 and 2016/2017 seasons.

== Results ==
=== Round 1 ===
Best of 5 frames

| 1 | (Scotland) Rhys Clark | 3–0 | 64 | (Romania) Alexandru Statache |
| 33 | (Sweden) Arpat Pulat | 0–3 | 32 | (Poland) Kacper Filipiak |
| 17 | (Germany) Lukas Kleckers | 3–0 | 48 | (Finland) Patrik Tiihonen |
| 49 | (Sweden) Belan Sharif | 3–2 | 16 | (Wales) Tyler Rees |
| 9 | (Republic of Ireland) Josh Boileau | 3–0 | 56 | (Russia) Mikhail Terekhov |
| 41 | (Latvia) Rodion Judin | 3–2 | 24 | (Sweden) Simon Lindblom |
| 25 | (Switzerland) Marvin Losi | 3–2 | 40 | (Russia) Barseg Petrosyan |
| 57 | (Israel) Amir Nardeia | 0–3 | 8 | (Poland) Adam Stefanow |
| 5 | (England) Luke Garland | 3–0 | 60 | (Germany) Richard Wienold |
| 37 | (Sweden) Benjamin McCabe | 0–3 | 28 | (Poland) Patryk Masłowski |
| 21 | (Israel) Maor Shalom | 3–0 | 44 | (Romania) Andrei Orzan |
| 53 | (Croatia) Filip Bermanec | 0–3 | 12 | (Israel) Shachar Ruberg |
| 13 | (Poland) Kamil Zubrzycki | 3–1 | 52 | (Slovakia) Patrik Sedlak |
| 45 | (France) Nicolas Mortreux | 0–3 | 20 | (Wales) Callum Lloyd |
| 29 | (Germany) Simon Lichtenberg | 3–1 | 36 | (England) Jordan Winbourne |
| 61 | (Belgium) Wesley Pelgrims | 0–3 | 4 | (Isle of Man) Darryl Hill |

| 3 | (England) Louis Heathcote | 3–1 | 62 | (Malta) John Farrugia |
| 35 | (Republic of Ireland) Aaron Moyles | 2–3 | 30 | (Netherlands) Tim De Ruyter |
| 19 | (Lithuania) Vilius Schulte | 3–1 | 46 | (Austria) Manuel Pomwenger |
| 51 | (Austria) Dominik Scherübl | 0–3 | 14 | (Scotland) Chris Totten |
| 11 | (Wales) Tom Rees | 3–0 | 51 | (Malta) Shaun Deguara |
| 43 | (Finland) Olli-Pekka Virho | 3–0 | 22 | (Malta) Chris Peplow |
| 27 | (Austria) Florian Nüßle | 1–3 | 38 | (France) Yannick Tarillon |
| 59 | (Poland) Michał Kotiuk | 1–3 | 6 | (Malta) Brian Cini |
| 7 | (Scotland) Dylan Craig | 3–0 | 58 | (Belgium) Dennis Deroose |
| 39 | (Romania) Mario Amza | 0–3 | 26 | (Scotland) Lee Mein |
| 23 | (France) Niel Vincent | 0–3 | 42 | (Republic of Ireland) Shane Bates |
| 55 | (Romania) Vladu Mihai | 3–0 | 10 | (Belgium) Kobe Vanoppen |
| 15 | (England) William Lemons | 3–1 | 50 | (Belarus) Vladislav Kalinovski |
| 47 | (Republic of Ireland) Stephen Bateman | 0–3 | 18 | (Belgium) Jeff Jacobs |
| 31 | (Germany) Felix Frede | 0–3 | 34 | (Poland) Mateusz Baranowski |
| 63 | (Russia) Ivan Kakovsky | 1–3 | 2 | (Wales) Jamie Clarke |

Round 2 Best of 7 frames
1 | (Scotland) Rhys Clark | 4
32 | (Poland) Kacper Filipiak | 3
17 | (Germany) Lukas Kleckers | 4
49 | (Sweden) Belan Sharif | 1
9 | (Republic of Ireland) Josh Boileau | 2
41 | (Latvia) Rodion Judin | 4
25 | (Switzerland) Marvin Losi | 0
8 | (Poland) Adam Stefanow | 4
5 | (England) Luke Garland | 1
28 | (Poland) Patryk Masłowski | 4
21 | (Israel) Maor Shalom | 3
12 | (Israel) Shachar Ruberg | 4
13 | (Poland) Kamil Zubrzycki | 4
20 | (Wales) Callum Lloyd | 2
29 | (Germany) Simon Lichtenberg | 0
4 | (Isle of Man) Darryl Hill | 4
3 | (England) Louis Heathcote | 4
30 | (Netherlands) Tim De Ruyter | 0
19 | (Lithuania) Vilius Schulte | 0
14 | (Scotland) Chris Totten | 4
11 | (Wales) Tom Rees | 4
42 | (Finland) Olli-Pekka Virho | 2
38 | (France) Yannick Tarillon | 1
6 | (Malta) Brian Cini | 4
7 | (Scotland) Dylan Craig | 4
26 | (Scotland) Lee Mein | 2
42 | (Republic of Ireland) Shane Bates | 3
55 | (Romania) Vladu Mihai | 4
15 | (England) William Lemons | 4
18 | (Belgium) Jeff Jacobs | 2
34 | (Poland) Mateusz Baranowski | 2
2 | (Wales) Jamie Clarke | 4

Round 3 Best of 7 frames
1 | (Scotland) Rhys Clark | 2
17 | (Germany) Lukas Kleckers | 4
41 | (Latvia) Rodion Judin | 2
8 | (Poland) Adam Stefanow | 4
5 | (Poland) Patryk Masłowski | 3
12 | (Israel) Shachar Ruberg | 4
13 | (Poland) Kamil Zubrzycki | 2
4 | (Isle of Man) Darryl Hill | 4
3 | (England) Louis Heathcote | 4
14 | (Scotland) Chris Totten | 0
11 | (Wales) Tom Rees | 1
6 | (Malta) Brian Cini | 4
7 | (Scotland) Dylan Craig | 4
55 | (Romania) Vladu Mihai | 0
15 | (England) William Lemons | 4
2 | (Wales) Jamie Clarke | 2

Quarter-Finals; Best of 9 frames
17 | (Germany) Lukas Kleckers | 5
8 | (Poland) Adam Stefanow | 3
12 | (Israel) Shachar Ruberg | 2
4 | (Isle of Man) Darryl Hill | 5
3 | (England) Louis Heathcote | 5
6 | (Malta) Brian Cini | 0
23 | (Scotland) Dylan Craig | 5
15 | (England) William Lemons | 1

Semi-Finals; Best of 9 frames
17 | (Germany) Lukas Kleckers | 4
4 | (Isle of Man) Darryl Hill | 5
3 | (England) Louis Heathcote | 5
7 | (Scotland) Dylan Craig | 2

Final; Best of 11 frames
4 | (Isle of Man) Darryl Hill | 6
3 | (England) Louis Heathcote | 3
