= 2022–23 Q Tour =

Series of snooker tournaments

Details
- Duration: 2 September 2022 – 5 March 2023
- Tournaments: 7

The 2022–23 Q Tour was a series of snooker tournaments that took place during the 2022–23 snooker season. The Q Tour is the second-tier tour, run by the World Professional Billiards and Snooker Association, for players not on the main World Snooker Tour.

A series of six events was played with the leading money-winner gaining a place on the main tour for the 2023–24 snooker season. The 16 highest-ranked players who had not already got a place on the main tour for the 2023–24 season, gained entry to a further event, the WPBSA Q Tour Playoff, the winner of which also got a place.

Martin O'Donnell won two of the six events to be the leading money-winner and gain a place on the main tour. Ashley Carty won the playoff to gain the second place.

== Format ==
Except for the playoff, events were played over three days. The first day was an open qualifying day with 16 places available. The main draw started on the second day when the 16 qualifiers were joined by the 48 seeded players who qualified based on their rankings in the 2022 Q School Order of Merit to make a first round field of 64 players. There were 3 rounds on the second day and a further three on the final day, to determine the winner of the event. The 48 who qualified directly included the top 32 eligible players from the 2022 UK Q School Order of Merit, the top eight from the 2022 Asia-Oceania Q School Order of Merit, and the eight highest ranked junior players not already qualified.

=== Prize fund ===
Each event featured a prize fund of £12,000 with the winner receiving £2,500.

- Winner: £2,500
- Runner-up: £1,200
- Semi-final: £750
- Quarter-final: £550
- Last 16: £275
- Last 32: £150
- Total: £12,000

== Schedule ==
The schedule for the six regular events and the playoff is given below.

Date		Country	Tournament	Venue	City	Field	Winner	Runner-up	Score	Ref.
2 Sep	4 Sep	ENG	Event 1	North East Snooker Centre	North Shields	118	(Scotland) Ross Muir	(England) George Pragnell	5–2	
16 Sep	18 Sep	ENG	Event 2	Castle Snooker Club	Brighton	120	(England) Martin O'Donnell	(England) George Pragnell	5–1	
14 Oct	16 Oct	BEL	Event 3	Delta Moon	Mons	90	(Pakistan) Farakh Ajaib	(England) Harvey Chandler	5–3	
25 Nov	27 Nov	SWE	Event 4	Snookerhallen	Stockholm	91	(England) Billy Castle	(England) Andrew Higginson	5–4	
9 Dec	11 Dec	ENG	Event 5	Landywood Snooker Club	Great Wyrley	103	(Wales) Daniel Wells	(England) Sydney Wilson	5–2	
6 Jan	8 Jan	ENG	Event 6	Northern Snooker Centre	Leeds	124	(England) Martin O'Donnell	(Scotland) Ross Muir	5–1	
4 Mar	5 Mar	ENG	Playoff	Q House Snooker Academy	Darlington	16	(England) Ashley Carty	(Austria) Florian Nüßle	5–2	

== Rankings ==
Below are listed the leading players in the prize money rankings. Players on equal points were ranked by "countback", with the player having won the most prize money in the latest event played being ranked higher.

Rank	Player	Event 1	Event 2	Event 3	Event 4	Event 5	Event 6	Total (£)
1	(England) Martin O'Donnell +	150	2,500	275	150	0	2,500	5,575
2	(Scotland) Ross Muir	2,500	150	750	275	150	1,200	5,025
3	(Wales) Daniel Wells	150	550	550	0	2,500	275	4,025
4	(England) Billy Castle	550	0	150	2,500	0	750	3,950
5	(England) George Pragnell	1,200	1,200	550	550	275	0	3,775
6	(Pakistan) Farakh Ajaib	275	150	2,500	550	150	0	3,625
7	(Jamaica) Rory McLeod	750	550	150	275	275	150	2,150
8	(Wales) Liam Davies	0	0	0	750	750	550	2,050
9	(England) Andrew Higginson	275	0	275	1,200	150	150	2,050
10	(England) Harvey Chandler	0	150	1,200	0	275	275	1,900
11	(Israel) Eden Sharav	550	275	0	150	275	550	1,800
12	(England) Sydney Wilson	0	0	–	–	1,200	550	1,750
13	(England) Ashley Carty +	275	750	150	0	550	0	1,725
14	(England) Hamim Hussain	275	550	550	150	0	150	1,675
15	(England) Steven Hallworth	150	0	150	275	275	750	1,600
16	(England) Joshua Thomond	150	275	750	150	275	0	1,600
17	(England) Peter Devlin	150	150	150	150	550	150	1,300
18	(Austria) Florian Nüßle	275	275	275	150	150	150	1,275
19	(England) Jamie Curtis-Barrett	550	150	550	-	0	0	1,250
20	(England) Luke Simmonds	750	150	0	0	0	275	1,175

+ Qualified for the main tour

== Event 1 ==
The first event took place at North East Snooker Centre, North Shields, from 2 to 4 September 2022. Ross Muir beat George Pragnell 5–2 in the final. Muir lost just five frames in the six rounds of the event. The final-day results are given below.

Quarter-finals; Best of 7 frames
(England) Jamie Curtis-Barrett	0
(Scotland) Ross Muir	4
(Jamaica) Rory McLeod	4
(Israel) Eden Sharav	2
(England) Stan Moody	0
(England) George Pragnell	4
(England) Billy Castle	1
(England) Luke Simmonds	4

Semi-finals; Best of 7 frames
(Scotland) Ross Muir	4
(Jamaica) Rory McLeod	1
(England) George Pragnell	4
(England) Luke Simmonds	2

Final; Best of 9 frames
(Scotland) Ross Muir	5
(England) George Pragnell	2

== Event 2 ==
The second event took place at Castle Snooker Club, Brighton, from 16 to 18 September 2022. Martin O'Donnell beat George Pragnell 5–1 in the final, having won his quarter and semi-final matches in the deciding frame. The final-day results are given below.

Quarter-finals; Best of 7 frames
(England) Hamim Hussain	3
(England) George Pragnell	4
(Jamaica) Rory McLeod	1
(China) Gao Yang	4
(England) Jack Haley	2
(England) Ashley Carty	4
(England) Martin O'Donnell	4
(Wales) Daniel Wells	3

Semi-finals; Best of 7 frames
(England) George Pragnell	4
(China) Gao Yang	3
(England) Ashley Carty	3
(England) Martin O'Donnell	4

Final; Best of 9 frames
(England) George Pragnell	1
(England) Martin O'Donnell	5

== Event 3 ==
The third event took place at the Delta Moon Club, Mons, Belgium from 14 to 16 October 2022. Farakh Ajaib beat Harvey Chandler 5–3 in the final. Chandler took a 2–0 lead before Ajaib won the next four frames, with a 45 clearance in frame 6 after Chandler had made a break of 60. The final-day results are given below.

Quarter-finals; Best of 7 frames
(England) Harvey Chandler	4
(England) Jamie Curtis-Barrett	3
(England) Josh Thomond	4
(England) Hamim Hussain	3
(Wales) Daniel Wells	3
(Scotland) Ross Muir	4
(England) George Pragnell	1
(Pakistan) Farakh Ajaib	4

Semi-finals; Best of 7 frames
(England) Harvey Chandler	4
(England) Josh Thomond	1
(Scotland) Ross Muir	3
(Pakistan) Farakh Ajaib	4

Final; Best of 9 frames
(England) Harvey Chandler	3
(Pakistan) Farakh Ajaib	5

== Event 4 ==
The fourth event took place at the Snookerhallen Club, Stockholm, Sweden from 25 to 27 November 2022. Billy Castle beat Andrew Higginson in the deciding frame of the final, on a re-spotted black. The final-day results are given below.

Quarter-finals; Best of 7 frames
(England) George Pragnell	2
(England) Andrew Higginson	4
(France) Brian Ochoiski	4
(England) Kuldesh Johal	1
(England) Billy Castle	4
(Pakistan) Farakh Ajaib	1
(Finland) Robin Hull	1
(Wales) Liam Davies	4

Semi-finals; Best of 7 frames
(England) Andrew Higginson	4
(France) Brian Ochoiski	2
(England) Billy Castle	4
(Wales) Liam Davies	1

Final; Best of 9 frames
(England) Andrew Higginson	4
(England) Billy Castle	5

== Event 5 ==
The fifth event took place at Landywood Snooker Club, Great Wyrley, from 9 to 11 December 2022. Daniel Wells beat Sydney Wilson 5–2 in the final. Wells lost the first three frames of his semi-final against Michael Georgiou, but won the next four to reach the final. The final-day results are given below.

Quarter-finals; Best of 7 frames
(England) Jamie Wilson	1
(Cyprus) Michael Georgiou	4
(England) Haydon Pinhey	1
(Wales) Daniel Wells	4
(England) Ashley Carty	3
(Wales) Liam Davies	4
(England) Sydney Wilson	4
(England) Peter Devlin	0

Semi-finals; Best of 7 frames
(Cyprus) Michael Georgiou	3
(Wales) Daniel Wells	4
(Wales) Liam Davies	1
(England) Sydney Wilson	4

Final; Best of 9 frames
(Wales) Daniel Wells	5
(England) Sydney Wilson	2

== Event 6 ==
The sixth event took place at the Northern Snooker Centre, Leeds, from 6 to 8 January 2023. The final was between Ross Muir and Martin O'Donnell. Both had won a Q Tour event earlier in the season and the points situation was such that the winner of the match would head the rankings and gain a place on the main tour for the following season. In the final O'Donnell won the opening frame with a break of 142 and went on to win the match by five frames to one. The final-day results are given below.

Quarter-finals; Best of 7 frames
(Scotland) Ross Muir	4
(Wales) Liam Davies	0
(England) Billy Castle	4
(England) Sydney Wilson	2
(Israel) Eden Sharav	1
(England) Steven Hallworth	4
(England) Simon Bedford	1
(England) Martin O'Donnell	4

Semi-finals; Best of 7 frames
(Scotland) Ross Muir	4
(England) Billy Castle	3
(England) Steven Hallworth	2
(England) Martin O'Donnell	4

Final; Best of 9 frames
(Scotland) Ross Muir	1
(England) Martin O'Donnell	5

== Playoff ==
The final event, the WPBSA Q Tour Playoff, was held at the Q House Snooker Academy in Darlington on 4 and 5 March. The event saw the 16 highest ranked players, excluding the player already qualified for the main tour, competed for a further place on that tour. Daniel Wells withdrew on medical grounds and was replaced by Florian Nüßle. Two rounds were played each day with matches over 7 frames except for the final which was over 9 frames. The draw was seeded, based on the final rankings. Ashley Carty beat Florian Nüßle 5–2 in the final. Carty lost the first three frames in his opening match against Farakh Ajaib but recovered to win 4–3. He was two frames down in his semi-final match against top seed Ross Muir but again won four frames in a row to win 4–2.

Last-16; Best of 7 frames
(Scotland) Ross Muir	4
(England) Peter Devlin	2
(England) Andrew Higginson	2
(England) Harvey Chandler	4
(Pakistan) Farakh Ajaib	3
(England) Ashley Carty	4
(England) George Pragnell	3
(England) Hamim Hussain	4
(England) Billy Castle	1
(England) Steven Hallworth	4
(Jamaica) Rory McLeod	2
(England) Sydney Wilson	4
(Wales) Liam Davies	4
(Israel) Eden Sharav	0
(Austria) Florian Nüßle	4
(England) Joshua Thomond	0

Quarter-finals; Best of 7 frames
(Scotland) Ross Muir	4
(England) Harvey Chandler	1
(England) Ashley Carty	4
(England) Hamim Hussain	1
(England) Steven Hallworth	4
(England) Sydney Wilson	1
(Wales) Liam Davies	3
(Austria) Florian Nüßle	4

Semi-finals; Best of 7 frames
(Scotland) Ross Muir	2
(England) Ashley Carty	4
(England) Steven Hallworth	1
(Austria) Florian Nüßle	4

Final; Best of 9 frames
(England) Ashley Carty	5
(Austria) Florian Nüßle	2
