= 2019 Gibraltar Open =

Snooker tournament

2019 Betway Gibraltar Open
Tournament information
- Dates: 15–17 March 2019
- Venue: Tercentenary Sports Hall
- City: Gibraltar
- Organisation: World Snooker
- Format: Ranking event
- Total prize fund: £177,000
- Winner's share: £25,000
- Highest break: Stuart Bingham (ENG) (142); Chen Feilong (CHN) (142)

Final
- Champion: Stuart Bingham (ENG)
- Runner-up: Ryan Day (WAL)
- Score: 4–1

The 2019 Gibraltar Open (officially the 2019 Betway Gibraltar Open) was a professional ranking snooker tournament that took place from 15 to 17 March 2019 at the Tercentenary Sports Hall in Gibraltar with qualifying rounds taking place 13–14 March 2019. It was the seventeenth ranking event of the 2018/2019 season.

Stuart Bingham won his 6th career ranking title by defeating defending champion Ryan Day 4–1 in the final.

== Prize fund ==
The breakdown of prize money for this year is shown below:

- Winner: £25,000
- Runner-up: £12,000
- Semi-final: £6,000
- Quarter-final: £4,000
- Last 16: £3,000
- Last 32: £2,500
- Last 64: £1,500
- Total: £177,000

The "rolling 147 prize" for a maximum break: £10,000

== Main draw ==
=== Top half ===
==== Section 1 ====
Last 128; Best of 7 frames
(Wales) Ryan Day	4
(Germany) Lukas Kleckers	0
(Thailand) Noppon Saengkham	4
(Republic of Ireland) Leo Fernandez	0
(England) Elliot Slessor	4
(England) Mark Winsor	1
(Scotland) Chris Totten	w/d
(England) Mark Davis	w/o
(England) Mark King	4
(England) Mark Joyce	0
(Germany) Simon Lichtenberg	2
(England) Chris Wakelin	4
(Wales) Jak Jones	1
(England) David Grace	4
(England) Peter Ebdon	4
(England) Jamie Curtis-Barrett	1

Last 64; Best of 7 frames
(Wales) Ryan Day	4
(Thailand) Noppon Saengkham	1
(England) Elliot Slessor	4
(England) Mark Davis	2
(England) Mark King	2
(England) Chris Wakelin	4
(England) David Grace	4
(England) Peter Ebdon	3

Last 32; Best of 7 frames
(Wales) Ryan Day	4
(England) Elliot Slessor	3
(England) Chris Wakelin	1
(England) David Grace	4

Last 16; Best of 7 frames
(Wales) Ryan Day	4
(England) David Grace	3

==== Section 2 ====
Last 128; Best of 7 frames
(England) Peter Lines	4
(England) Matthew Glasby	2
(China) Fan Zhengyi	4
(England) Harvey Chandler	3
(Wales) Daniel Wells	4
(England) Marvin Morgan	2
(England) Ali Carter	w/d
(Wales) Khurram Khan	w/o
(England) Billy Joe Castle	w/o
(England) Sam Craigie	w/d
(Pakistan) Hamza Akbar	4
(Wales) Michael White	3
(Northern Ireland) Joe Swail	4
(Northern Ireland) Gerard Greene	3
(England) David Gilbert	4
(Spain) David Alcaide	1

Last 64; Best of 7 frames
(England) Peter Lines	4
(China) Fan Zhengyi	3
(Wales) Daniel Wells	4
(Wales) Khurram Khan	0
(England) Billy Joe Castle	3
(Pakistan) Hamza Akbar	4
(Northern Ireland) Joe Swail	2
(England) David Gilbert	4

Last 32; Best of 7 frames
(England) Peter Lines	0
(Wales) Daniel Wells	4
(Pakistan) Hamza Akbar	2
(England) David Gilbert	4

Last 16; Best of 7 frames
(Wales) Daniel Wells	3
(England) David Gilbert	4

==== Section 3 ====
Last 128; Best of 7 frames
(Belgium) Luca Brecel	3
(England) Liam Highfield	4
(Republic of Ireland) Fergal O'Brien	4
(Norway) Christopher Watts	0
(China) Chen Feilong	2
(China) Tian Pengfei	4
(Cyprus) Michael Georgiou	4
(England) Paul Davison	2
(China) Yan Bingtao	4
(Wales) Lee Walker	3
(Wales) Kishan Hirani	1
(England) Barry Pinches	4
(China) Chen Zifan	4
(England) Farakh Ajaib	1
(Finland) Robin Hull	4
(China) Zhang Anda	2

Last 64; Best of 7 frames
(England) Liam Highfield	4
(Republic of Ireland) Fergal O'Brien	1
(China) Tian Pengfei	4
(Cyprus) Michael Georgiou	0
(China) Yan Bingtao	4
(England) Barry Pinches	2
(China) Chen Zifan	2
(Finland) Robin Hull	4

Last 32; Best of 7 frames
(England) Liam Highfield	0
(China) Tian Pengfei	4
(China) Yan Bingtao	4
(Finland) Robin Hull	1

Last 16; Best of 7 frames
(China) Tian Pengfei	4
(China) Yan Bingtao	3

==== Section 4 ====
Last 128; Best of 7 frames
(Wales) Jamie Clarke	4
(China) Luo Honghao	1
(England) Nigel Bond	4
(England) Daniel Bagley	1
(England) Michael Holt	3
(England) Oliver Brown	4
(England) Jimmy Robertson	4
(England) Sam Baird	0
(England) Ricky Walden	3
(England) Jamie O'Neill	4
(China) Lu Ning	4
(England) Adam Ashley	3
(Wales) Dominic Dale	4
(Wales) Elfed Evans	3
(England) Shaun Murphy	w/o
(Wales) Matthew Stevens	w/d

Last 64; Best of 7 frames
(Wales) Jamie Clarke	4
(England) Nigel Bond	0
(England) Oliver Brown	4
(England) Jimmy Robertson	3
(England) Jamie O'Neill	2
(China) Lu Ning	4
(Wales) Dominic Dale	2
(England) Shaun Murphy	4

Last 32; Best of 7 frames
(Wales) Jamie Clarke	2
(England) Oliver Brown	4
(China) Lu Ning	4
(England) Shaun Murphy	2

Last 16; Best of 7 frames
(England) Oliver Brown	2
(China) Lu Ning	4

=== Bottom half ===
==== Section 5 ====
Last 128; Best of 7 frames
(England) Barry Hawkins	3
(England) Ashley Carty	4
(England) Andrew Higginson	4
(Scotland) Dylan Craig	1
(Hong Kong) Andy Lee	4
(England) Curtis Daher	0
(England) Allan Taylor	3
(England) Kuldesh Johal	4
(Scotland) Anthony McGill	4
(China) Zhang Yong	3
(Scotland) Scott Donaldson	4
(Wales) Duane Jones	3
(England) Matthew Selt	3
(England) Andy Hicks	4
(China) Zhou Yuelong	4
(Poland) Łukasz Guzowski	0

Last 64; Best of 7 frames
(England) Ashley Carty	2
(England) Andrew Higginson	4
(Hong Kong) Andy Lee	4
(England) Kuldesh Johal	3
(Scotland) Anthony McGill	3
(Scotland) Scott Donaldson	4
(England) Andy Hicks	1
(China) Zhou Yuelong	4

Last 32; Best of 7 frames
(England) Andrew Higginson	4
(Hong Kong) Andy Lee	0
(Scotland) Scott Donaldson	1
(China) Zhou Yuelong	4

Last 16; Best of 7 frames
(England) Andrew Higginson	3
(China) Zhou Yuelong	4

==== Section 6 ====
Last 128; Best of 7 frames
(Norway) Kurt Maflin	4
(England) Joe O'Connor	1
(England) Rory McLeod	4
(Ukraine) Sergey Isaenko	0
(Iran) Soheil Vahedi	1
(Thailand) Thepchaiya Un-Nooh	4
(Scotland) Graeme Dott	w/d
(England) John Astley	w/o
(England) Ashley Hugill	4
(England) Halim Hussain	0
(Israel) Eden Sharav	4
(England) Mike Finn	3
(England) Anthony Hamilton	4
(Portugal) Francisco Domingues	0
(England) Stuart Bingham	4
(England) Mike Dunn	1

Last 64; Best of 7 frames
(Norway) Kurt Maflin	4
(England) Rory McLeod	1
(Thailand) Thepchaiya Un-Nooh	4
(England) John Astley	1
(England) Ashley Hugill	3
(Israel) Eden Sharav	4
(England) Anthony Hamilton	0
(England) Stuart Bingham	4

Last 32; Best of 7 frames
(Norway) Kurt Maflin	4
(Thailand) Thepchaiya Un-Nooh	1
(Israel) Eden Sharav	3
(England) Stuart Bingham	4

Last 16; Best of 7 frames
(Norway) Kurt Maflin	2
(England) Stuart Bingham	4

==== Section 7 ====
Last 128; Best of 7 frames
(England) Jack Lisowski	4
(England) Hammad Miah	1
(England) Gary Wilson	4
(China) Zhao Xintong	2
(Republic of Ireland) Ken Doherty	4
(England) Oliver Lines	0
(England) Martin O'Donnell	3
(Spain) Francisco Sánchez Ruiz	4
(England) Joe Perry	2
(England) Sean O'Sullivan	4
(England) Ian Burns	4
(England) Alfie Burden	1
(China) Yuan Sijun	4
(England) Sanderson Lam	0
(England) Craig Steadman	1
(England) James Cahill	4

Last 64; Best of 7 frames
(England) Jack Lisowski	3
(England) Gary Wilson	4
(Republic of Ireland) Ken Doherty	4
(Spain) Francisco Sánchez Ruiz	2
(England) Sean O'Sullivan	4
(England) Ian Burns	2
(China) Yuan Sijun	4
(England) James Cahill	3

Last 32; Best of 7 frames
(England) Gary Wilson	4
(Republic of Ireland) Ken Doherty	1
(England) Sean O'Sullivan	1
(China) Yuan Sijun	4

Last 16; Best of 7 frames
(England) Gary Wilson	2
(China) Yuan Sijun	4

==== Section 8 ====
Last 128; Best of 7 frames
(England) Ben Woollaston	4
(Republic of Ireland) Ronan Whyte	0
(China) Xu Si	2
(China) Zhang Jiankang	4
(Poland) Adam Stefanow	2
(England) Robert Milkins	4
(England) Tom Ford	4
(England) David Lilley	3
(England) Rod Lawler	4
(Wales) Steven Thomas	0
(Scotland) Ross Muir	4
(Belgium) Kevin Van Hove	0
(England) Robbie Williams	2
(England) Jimmy White	4
(England) Kyren Wilson	4
(Northern Ireland) Jordan Brown	0

Last 64; Best of 7 frames
(England) Ben Woollaston	4
(China) Zhang Jiankang	2
(England) Robert Milkins	4
(England) Tom Ford	2
(England) Rod Lawler	1
(Scotland) Ross Muir	4
(England) Jimmy White	1
(England) Kyren Wilson	4

Last 32; Best of 7 frames
(England) Ben Woollaston	1
(England) Robert Milkins	4
(Scotland) Ross Muir	1
(England) Kyren Wilson	4

Last 16; Best of 7 frames
(England) Robert Milkins	4
(England) Kyren Wilson	2

=== Finals ===
Quarter-finals; Best of 7 frames
(Wales) Ryan Day	4
(England) David Gilbert	2
(China) Tian Pengfei	3
(China) Lu Ning	4
(China) Zhou Yuelong	0
(England) Stuart Bingham	4
(China) Yuan Sijun	4
(England) Robert Milkins	3

Semi-finals; Best of 7 frames
(Wales) Ryan Day	4
(China) Lu Ning	2
(England) Stuart Bingham	4
(China) Yuan Sijun	0

Final; Best of 7 frames
(Wales) Ryan Day	1
(England) Stuart Bingham	4

== Final ==
Final: Best of 7 frames. Referee: Małgorzata Kanieska. Tercentenary Sports Hall, Gibraltar, 17 March 2019.
Ryan Day; Wales	1–4	Stuart Bingham; England
83–52, 13–115 (100), 0–84, 5–103 (103), 41–81
83	Highest break	103
0	Century breaks	2

== Amateur pre-qualifying ==
Qualifying rounds were played in Gibraltar on 13–14 March 2019. All matches were played best of 7 frames.

=== Round 1 ===
(Republic of Ireland) Leo Fernandez	4–1	(England) Peter Devlin
(England) Mark Winsor	4–1	(England) Dan Barsley
(England) Jenson Kendrick	1–4	(England) David Grace
(Norway) Edwin Ingebrigtsen	1–4	(England) Adam Nash
(Gibraltar) Francis Becerra	w/o–w/d	(England) Bhavesh Sodha
(Wales) Khurram Khan	4–0	(England) Joshua Mallender
(England) Martin Pitcher	1–4	(Spain) David Alcaide
(Norway) Christopher Watts	4–2	(England) George Pragnall
(England) Ian Martin	1–4	(England) Barry Pinches
(England) Patrick Whelan	4–3	(England) Luke Pinches
(Ukraine) Iulian Boiko	4–1	(England) Sean Maddocks
(Gibraltar) Blythe Reeve	0–4	(France) Fabian Monnin
(England) Steven Breward	0–4	(Germany) Daniel Schneider
(Scotland) Aaron Graham	0–4	(Saudi Arabia) Omar Alajlani

(England) Curtis Daher	4–1	(England) Rishi Gohill
(Saudi Arabia) Nezar Asseri	1–4	(England) Kuldesh Johal
(England) Paul Gibbs	0–4	(England) Damian Wilks
(Scotland) Abid Manzoor	2–4	(England) James Budd
(England) Nick Jennings	4–2	(England) Andrew Milliard
(Gibraltar) Gareth Lopez	0–4	(England) Halim Hussain
(England) Mike Finn	4–1	(England) Mitchell Grinstead
(South Africa) Paul Burrell	3–4	(Portugal) Francisco Domingues
(Spain) Francisco Sánchez Ruiz	4–0	(France) Christophe Rives-Lange
(Wales) Callum Lloyd	1–4	(England) James Cahill
(Republic of Ireland) Ronan Whyte	4–3	(Saudi Arabia) Hani Owaidhi
(Wales) Jackson Page	0–4	(England) David Lilley
(Republic of Ireland) Tony Corrigan	3–4	(Wales) Steven Thomas
(Belgium) Kevin Van Hove	4–0	(China) Eric Pei

=== Round 2 ===
(England) Aaran Hetherington	0–4	(Republic of Ireland) Leo Fernandez
(England) Henry Roper	1–4	(England) Mark Winsor
(Bulgaria) Ivelin Boyanov Bozhanov	0–4	(England) David Grace
(England) Jamie Curtis-Barrett	4–0	(England) Adam Nash
(Morocco) Yassine Zaraoni	1–4	(England) Matthew Glasby
(England) Marvin Morgan	4–2	(Gibraltar) Francis Becerra
(England) Dale Prime	0–4	(Wales) Khurram Khan
(England) Andrew Urbaniak	0–4	(Spain) David Alcaide
(Saudi Arabia) Aymn Alamri	1–4	(Norway) Christopher Watts
(England) Stephen Kershaw	0–4	(England) Barry Pinches
(England) Farakh Ajaib	4–3	(England) Patrick Whelan
(England) Daniel Bagley	4–0	(England) Paul Thompson
(England) Oliver Brown	4–2	(Ukraine) Iulian Boiko
(England) Jamie O'Neill	4–0	(France) Fabian Monnin
(England) Adam Ashley	4–2	(Germany) Daniel Schneider
(Wales) Elfed Evans	4–0	(Saudi Arabia) Omar Alajlani

(Scotland) Dylan Craig	4–2	(England) Mark Vincent
(England) Jonathan Noble	2–4	(England) Curtis Daher
(Gibraltar) Andrew Olivero	0–4	(England) Kuldesh Johal
(England) Andy Hicks	4–1	(England) Damian Wilks
(Poland) Łukasz Guzowski	4–2	(England) James Budd
(Ukraine) Sergey Isaenko	4–2	(England) Nick Jennings
(England) James Height	1–4	(England) Halim Hussain
(England) Danny Brindle	2–4	(England) Mike Finn
(England) Jack Moore	0–4	(Portugal) Francisco Domingues
(England) Sean McAllister	2–4	(Spain) Francisco Sánchez Ruiz
(England) Umar Younis	0–4	(England) James Cahill
(Gibraltar) Adrian Holmes	0–4	(Republic of Ireland) Ronan Whyte
(Saudi Arabia) Abdulraouf Sayegh	1–4	(England) David Lilley
(England) Lee Prickman	1–4	(Wales) Steven Thomas
(England) Shahidul Islam	0–4	(Belgium) Kevin Van Hove

== Century breaks ==
=== Main stage centuries ===
Total: 46

- 142, 134, 112, 103, 103, 102, 102, 100, 100 – Stuart Bingham
- 142 – Chen Feilong
- 139, 112 – Thepchaiya Un-Nooh
- 139, 109 – Kyren Wilson
- 139 – Paul Davison
- 139 – Chris Wakelin
- 136, 111 – Kurt Maflin
- 135, 105 – Peter Ebdon
- 129 – Ashley Carty
- 129 – Sean O'Sullivan
- 127 – Jamie Clarke
- 126 – Zhao Xintong
- 123 – David Lilley
- 122, 107 – David Gilbert
- 120, 103, 103, 101 – Yuan Sijun
- 120 – Hammad Miah
- 120 – Jimmy White
- 117 – Jack Lisowski
- 115 – Barry Pinches
- 112 – Yan Bingtao
- 109 – James Cahill
- 108 – Joe Swail
- 106 – Daniel Wells
- 105 – Hamza Akbar
- 104 – Zhou Yuelong
- 103 – Ross Muir
- 102 – Martin O'Donnell
- 101, 100 – Gary Wilson
- 100 – Ryan Day

=== Qualifying rounds centuries ===
Total: 1

- 100 – Barry Pinches
