= Daniel Wells (snooker player) =

Welsh snooker player (born 1988)

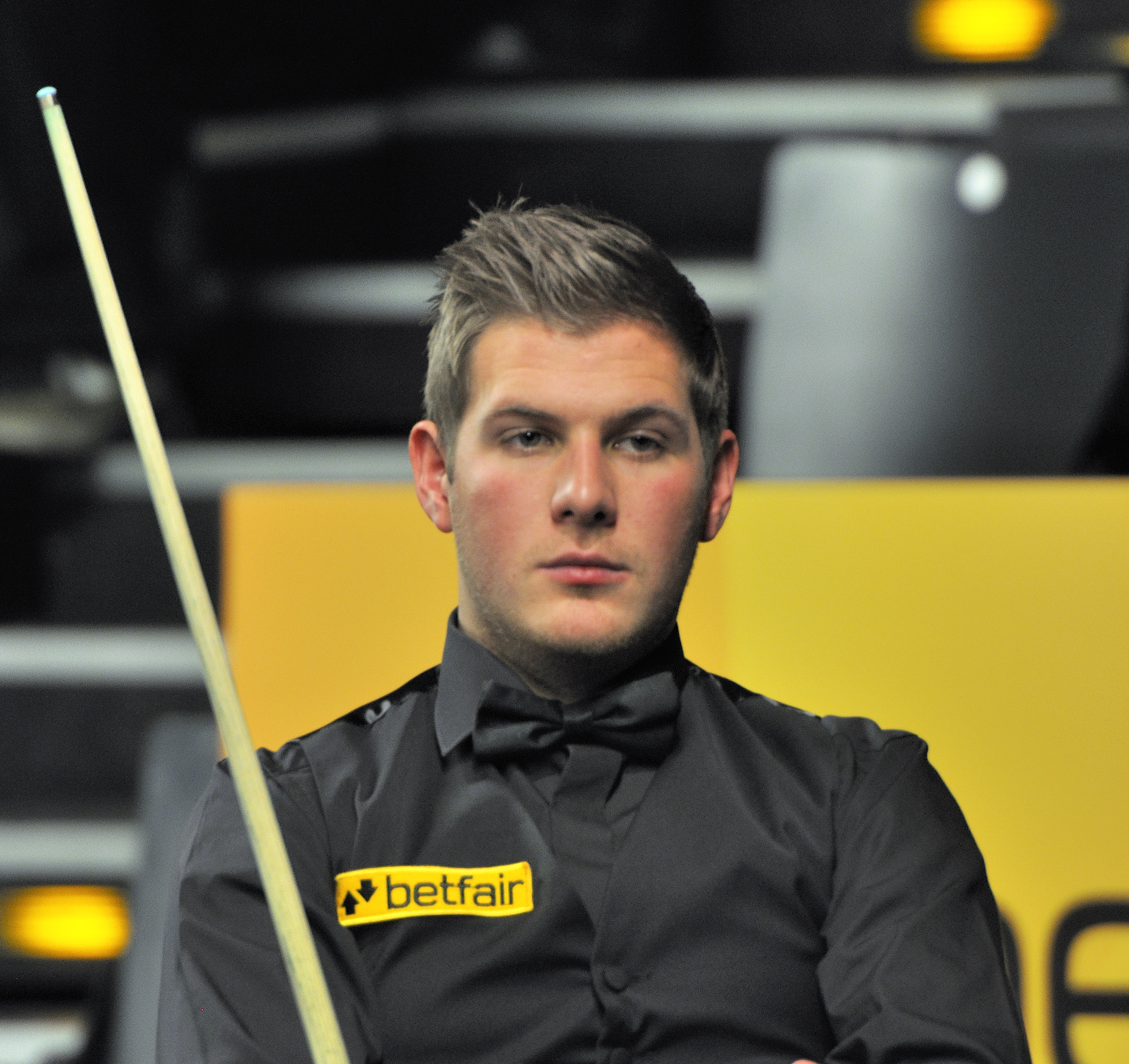
- Wells at the 2013 German Masters

Personal information
- Born: 31 July 1988 (age 38) Neath, Glamorgan, Wales

Sport
- Country: Wales
- Sport: Snooker
- Professional: 2008–2010, 2011–2014, 2015–2021, 2023–present
- Highest ranking: 39 (February 2026)
- Current ranking: 47 (as of 7 November 2026)
- Century breaks: 128 (as of 19 November 2026)
- Best ranking finish: Semi-final (x4)

Daniel Wells (born 31 July 1988) is a Welsh professional snooker player from Neath. He has twice come through Qualifying School to play on the professional snooker tour, and turned professional again at the beginning of the 2023–24 season after placing top of the 2022–23 One Year Ranking List for players outside the top 64, despite competing as an amateur for the entire season.

== Career ==
=== Early career ===
He was awarded the inaugural Paul Hunter Scholarship. This gave him the chance to practise in the World Snooker Academy in Sheffield, alongside professional players, such as Peter Ebdon and Ding Junhui.

He first qualified for the Main Tour for the 2008–09 season by finishing ranked fifth on the International Open Series rankings.

=== 2008/2009 ===
He had consistent results on his first spell on the main tour, winning his first qualifying match in most events, apart from defeat in the first qualifying round to Stefan Mazrocis in the Grand Prix. This was followed by a run to the penultimate qualifying round of the Bahrain Championship where he lost to John Parrott 3–5.

An impressive run to the last 16 of the Masters Qualifying tournament included a 5–4 win over Liang Wenbo. He followed this with a defeat to Li Hang in the first qualifying round of UK Championship 3–9.

At the World Championship, Wells needed a good run of results to ensure his place on the tour for the following season. A sequence of 10–9 wins over Li Hang, Ian Preece and Marcus Campbell took him to the final qualifying round where he lost 9–10 to Barry Hawkins in the final qualifying match. In his four qualifying matches, he played the maximum 76 frames. His ranking rose to No. 70.

=== 2009/2010 ===
Wells started the new season with a win over fellow Welshman Ian Preece 5–3 in the Shanghai Masters before losing to Joe Delaney in the next round by the same scoreline. In the UK Championship, he narrowly lost 8–9 to fellow Welshman Michael White. In his home championship, the Welsh Open, Wells narrowly lost in the first qualifying round to James Wattana 4–5. Another first qualifying round defeat in the China Open meant that Wells was again in danger of losing his place on the tour. Wells failed to repeat his exploits of the previous season in the World Championship as he lost 7–10 to former world No. 12 David Gray in the first qualifying round. This meant that he fell off the tour.

=== 2010/2011 ===
Despite not being on the main tour during the 2010–11 season Wells entered many of the PTC and EPTC events, and recorded some impressive wins eventually finishing 29th on the Order of Merit. He regained a place on the main tour for 2011–12 by finishing top of the Welsh rankings. Wells also won the European Snooker Championships and the European Team Championships (with team Wales).

=== 2011/2012 ===
As an unranked player on the tour Wells would need to win four qualifying matches to reach the main draw of the ranking events. However, he only won three matches during the season, including going without a single victory in the 11 of 12 Players Tour Championship events that he played. He finished the season without a ranking and had to enter Q School in an attempt to earn a place on the tour for the 2012–13 season. In May, Wells won five matches at the second 2012 Q School event concluding with a 4–3 win over Michael Wasley to earn a place on the tour for the next two seasons.

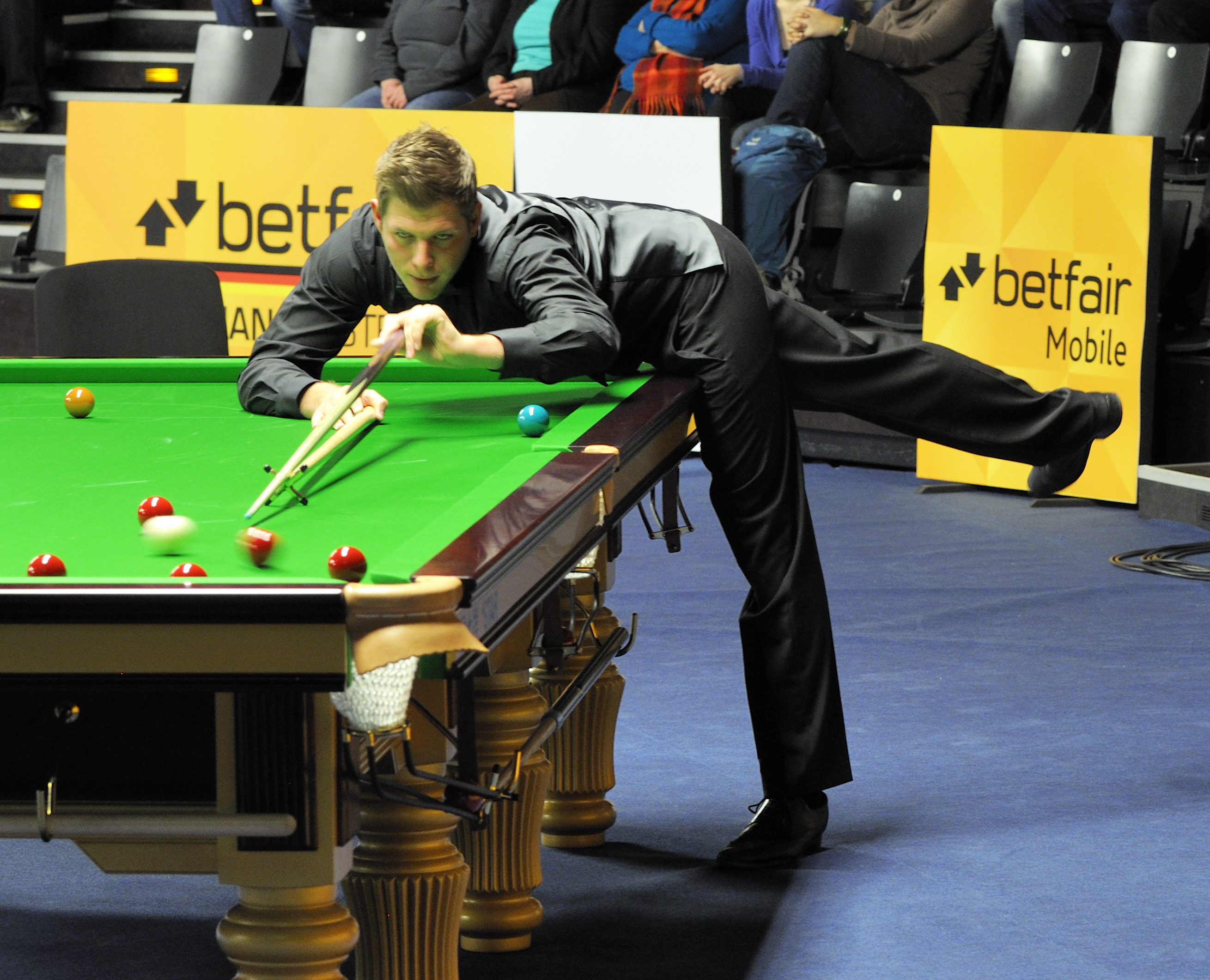
Daniel Wells at the 2013 German Masters

=== 2012/2013 ===
Wells did not win two consecutive matches in qualifying for any of the ranking events in the 2012/2013 season, and therefore did not reach the main draw for any tournaments. He played in all ten Players Tour Championship events this season, with his best results being two last 64 defeats, to be placed 101st on the PTC Order of Merit. His season ended when he was beaten 7–10 by Aditya Mehta in the first round of World Championship Qualifying which saw him finish ranked world number 87.

=== 2013/2014 ===
Wells lost in the qualifying rounds of the first five ranking events in the 2013–14 season, but received automatic entry into the UK Championship as all 128 players began the tournament in the first round. It was here that Wells won the first match at a main venue for the first time in his career by defeating Alfie Burden 6–4, but he then lost 6–3 to Joe Perry. The only event Wells qualified for this season was the German Masters, with an impressive 5–1 victory over Nigel Bond, before he was eliminated in the first round 5–1 by Gary Wilson. After Wells was beaten 10–7 by Kurt Maflin in the second round of World Championship qualifying he was ranked world number 100 meaning he could no longer reach the top 64 and was relegated from the tour. He played in the 2014 Q School in an attempt to regain his place and came closest to doing so in the second event when he lost in the last 16 to Ashley Carty.

=== 2014/2015 ===
Wells was back to being an amateur player for the 2014–15 season, but still considered himself as a professional as he was playing for his living. He faced Ronnie O'Sullivan in the first round of the UK Championship and, despite his opponent playing with a broken ankle, Wells was beaten 6–2. He lost 4–2 to Gerard Greene in the first round of the Welsh Open. Wells qualified for his first China Open by defeating Robbie Williams 5–3 and lost the last three frames in the first round against Graeme Dott to be eliminated 5–3. At the first event of the 2015 Q School he eliminated Alexander Ursenbacher 4–1 in the final round to earn a two-year tour card starting with the 2015–16 season.

=== 2015/2016 ===
Wells played in his first International Championship by beating Rory McLeod 6–1 and advanced through a wildcard round in China, before losing 6–4 to Lee Walker in the first round. He won three matches to reach the last 16 of the Bulgarian Open where he was eliminated 4–0 by Mike Dunn. He would finish 39th on the European Order of Merit. Wells saw off Rod Lawler 6–4 at the UK Championship, despite abandoning his car due to traffic and running to the venue before the match. He lost 6–3 to Ali Carter in the second round. Wells reached the same stage of the Welsh Open by beating Andrew Higginson 4–2, but was knocked out 4–1 by Marco Fu.

=== 2016/2017 ===
Wells began using a new cue at the beginning of the 2016–17 season and it proved to be his most successful year to date. He qualified for the World Open by thrashing Tian Pengfei 5–0 and then beat Xu Si 5–3, before recording another 5–0 whitewash this time over Kyren Wilson to reach the last 16 of a ranking event for the first time. After being 2–0 down to Ali Carter he moved 4–2 ahead, before missing chances to play in the quarter-finals and was defeated 5–4. Wells qualified for the International Championship by overcoming Mark Allen 6–5 and eliminated Stuart Carrington 6–2 in the first round, but then lost 6–5 to Michael Holt having been 5–3 up. A 6–5 win over Ian Burns at the UK Championship saw Wells face world number one Mark Selby in the second round. Wells was 3–1 ahead, but would be defeated 6–4. He advanced to the third round of both the Scottish Open and Gibraltar Open, losing 4–3 to Yu Delu and 4–0 to Nigel Bond respectively. Wells qualified for the China Open with a 5–3 victory over Marco Fu and reached the last 16 for the second time this season by beating Jamie Cope 5–3 and Matthew Stevens 5–2, but lost 5–1 to Stephen Maguire. Wells finished a season within the top 64 in the world rankings for the first time as he was number 62.

=== 2018/2019 ===
He advanced to the quarter-final of the Paul Hunter Classic losing 4–3 to Kyren Wilson. Wells reached the semifinal of a ranking tournament for the first time at the 2018 Scottish Open, and despite leading 4–0, and 5–2 over Mark Allen he lost 6–5. He advanced to the four round of both the English Open, Shoot-Out and Gibraltar Open, losing 4–3 to Ali Carter, 1–0 to Rod Lawler and 4–3 to David Gilbert respectively.

== Performance and rankings timeline ==
Tournament	2008/ 09	2009/ 10	2010/ 11	2011/ 12	2012/ 13	2013/ 14	2014/ 15	2015/ 16	2016/ 17	2017/ 18	2018/ 19	2019/ 20	2020/ 21	2021/ 22	2022/ 23	2023/ 24	2024/ 25	2025/ 26	2026/ 27
Ranking (Note: It shows the ranking at the beginning of the season)	(Note: New players on the Main Tour don't have a ranking)	70	(Note: He was an amateur)		(Note: Players qualified through Q School started the season without ranking points)	87			87	61	63	58	56			(Note: Players qualified One Year Ranking List started the season without ranking points)	66	44	45
Ranking tournaments
Championship League	Non-Ranking Event												WD	A	2R	2R	RR	RR	RR
China Open	LQ	LQ	A	LQ	LQ	LQ	1R	LQ	3R	LQ	LQ	Tournament Not Held							LQ
Wuhan Open	Tournament Not Held															1R	LQ	LQ	2R
British Open	Tournament Not Held													A	LQ	1R	LQ	LQ	1R
English Open	Tournament Not Held								2R	2R	4R	2R	1R	A	A	LQ	LQ	1R	2R
Shenzhen Open (Note: The event was called the Xi'an Grand Prix (2024/2025–2025/2026))	Tournament Not Held																SF	SF	LQ
Northern Ireland Open	Tournament Not Held								1R	1R	2R	1R	1R	A	2R	LQ	LQ	1R	3R
International Championship	Tournament Not Held				LQ	LQ	LQ	1R	2R	LQ	LQ	2R	Not Held			3R	LQ	2R	2R
UK Championship	LQ	LQ	A	LQ	LQ	2R	1R	2R	2R	1R	2R	2R	1R	A	A	LQ	LQ	LQ	
Shoot Out	Not Held		Non-Ranking Event						3R	1R	4R	2R	1R	A	SF	1R	1R	1R	
Scottish Open	Tournament Not Held				MR	Not Held			3R	3R	SF	1R	1R	A	A	1R	1R	LQ	
German Masters	Not Held		1R	LQ	LQ	1R	LQ	LQ	LQ	LQ	LQ	LQ	LQ	A	1R	LQ	2R	LQ	
Welsh Open	LQ	LQ	A	LQ	LQ	1R	1R	2R	1R	2R	1R	3R	1R	A	3R	2R	LQ	LQ	
World Grand Prix	Tournament Not Held						NR	DNQ	DNQ	DNQ	DNQ	DNQ	DNQ	DNQ	DNQ	DNQ	DNQ	DNQ	
Players Championship (Note: The event was called the Players Tour Championship Grand Final (2010/2011–2015/2016))	Not Held		DNQ	DNQ	DNQ	DNQ	DNQ	DNQ	DNQ	DNQ	DNQ	DNQ	DNQ	DNQ	DNQ	DNQ	DNQ	DNQ	
World Open (Note: The event was called the Grand Prix (2008/2009–2009/2010))	LQ	LQ	LQ	LQ	LQ	LQ	Not Held		3R	2R	LQ	LQ	Not Held			3R	2R	2R	
Tour Championship	Tournament Not Held										DNQ	DNQ	DNQ	DNQ	DNQ	DNQ	DNQ	DNQ	
World Championship	LQ	LQ	A	LQ	LQ	LQ	LQ	LQ	LQ	LQ	LQ	LQ	LQ	LQ	LQ	LQ	1R	LQ	
Non-ranking tournaments
The Masters	LQ	LQ	A	A	A	A	A	A	A	A	A	A	A	A	A	A	A	A	
Championship League	A	A	A	A	A	A	A	A	A	A	A	RR	A	A	A	A	A	A	
Former ranking tournaments
Northern Ireland Trophy	LQ	Tournament Not Held																	
Bahrain Championship	LQ	Tournament Not Held																	
Wuxi Classic (Note: The event was called the Jiangsu Classic (2008/2009–2009/2010))	Non-Ranking Event				LQ	LQ	LQ	Tournament Not Held											
Australian Goldfields Open	Not Held			LQ	LQ	LQ	LQ	LQ	Tournament Not Held										
Shanghai Masters	LQ	LQ	A	LQ	LQ	LQ	LQ	LQ	LQ	1R	Non-Ranking		Not Held			Non-Ranking Event			
Paul Hunter Classic	Pro-am		Minor-Ranking Event						A	1R	QF	NR	Tournament Not Held						
Indian Open	Tournament Not Held					LQ	LQ	NH	1R	1R	LQ	Tournament Not Held							
Riga Masters (Note: The event was called the Riga Open (2014/2015–2015/2016))	Tournament Not Held						Minor-Rank		LQ	LQ	LQ	2R	Tournament Not Held						
China Championship	Tournament Not Held								NR	1R	1R	1R	Tournament Not Held						
WST Pro Series	Tournament Not Held												RR	Tournament Not Held					
Gibraltar Open	Tournament Not Held							MR	3R	2R	4R	2R	2R	A	Tournament Not Held				
WST Classic	Tournament Not Held														3R	Tournament Not Held			
European Masters	Tournament Not Held								LQ	LQ	LQ	1R	WD	A	3R	1R	Not Held		
Saudi Arabia Masters	Tournament Not Held																2R	3R	NH

Performance Table Legend
LQ	lost in the qualifying draw	#R	lost in the early rounds of the tournament (WR = Wildcard round, RR = Round robin)	QF	lost in the quarter-finals
SF	lost in the semi-finals	F	lost in the final	W	won the tournament
DNQ	did not qualify for the tournament	A	did not participate in the tournament	WD	withdrew from the tournament

NH / Not Held	means an event was not held.
NR / Non-Ranking Event	means an event is/was no longer a ranking event.
R / Ranking Event	means an event is/was a ranking event.
MR / Minor-Ranking Event	means an event is/was a minor-ranking event.
PA / Pro-am Event	means an event is/was a pro-am event.

== Career finals ==
=== Pro-am finals: 1 ===
Outcome	No.	Year	Championship	Opponent in the final	Score
Runner-up	1.	2007	Pontins Spring Open	(Republic of Ireland) Leo Fernandez	2–5

=== Amateur finals: 5 (3 titles) ===
Outcome	No.	Year	Championship	Opponent in the final	Score
Runner-up	1.	2007	PIOS – Event 5	(England) Peter Lines	5–6
Winner	1.	2011	Welsh Amateur Championship	(Wales) David John	8–4
Winner	2.	2011	EBSA European Snooker Championship	(Republic of Ireland) Vincent Muldoon	7–4
Runner-up	2.	2015	Welsh Amateur Championship	(Wales) Darren Morgan	0–8
Winner	3.	2022	Q Tour – Event 5	(England) Sydney Wilson	5–2
