= Ross Muir =

Scottish snooker player

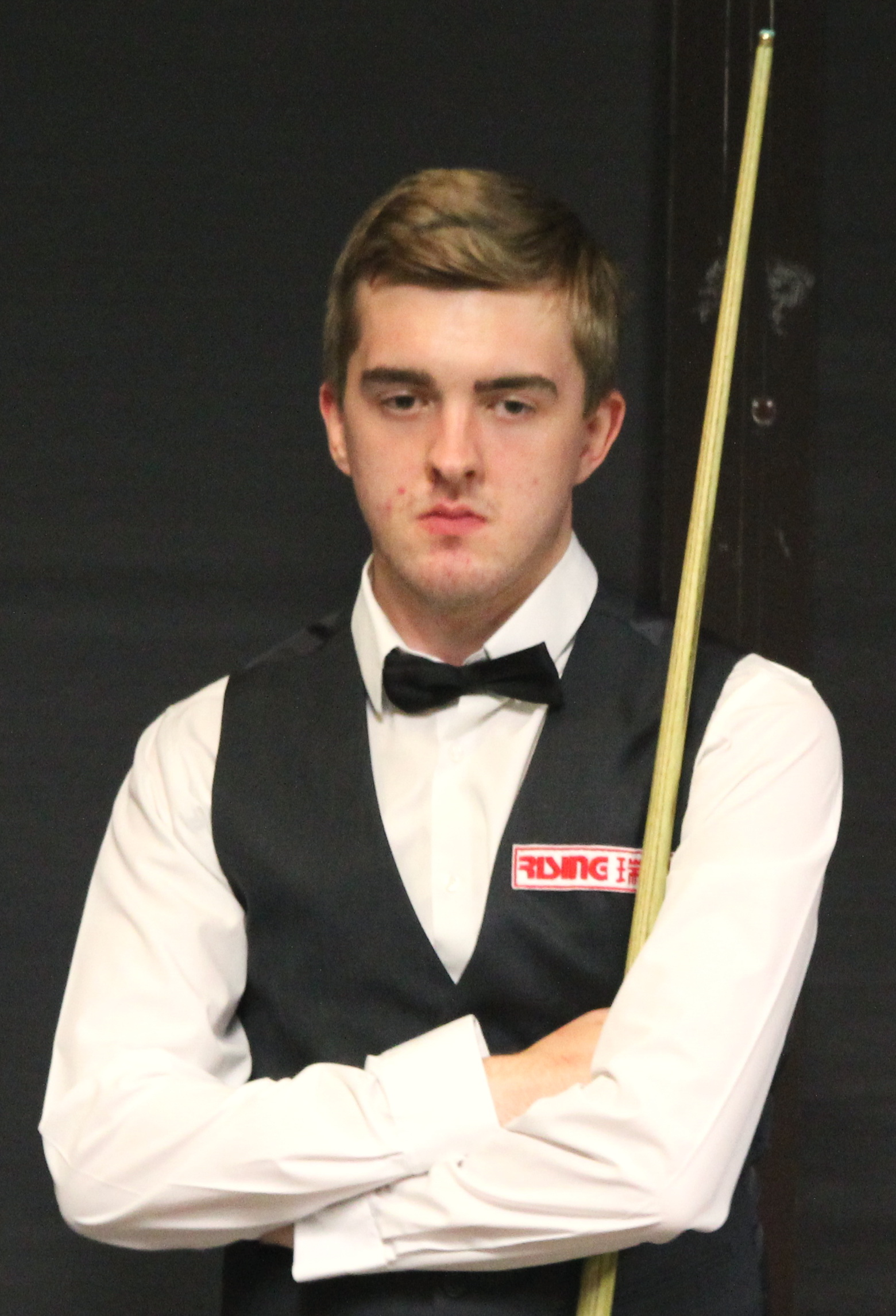
- Paul Hunter Classic 2016

Personal information
- Born: 6 October 1995 (age 31) Edinburgh, Scotland

Sport
- Country: Scotland
- Sport: Snooker
- Professional: 2013–2019, 2023–present
- Highest ranking: 67 (May 2017)
- Current ranking: 81 (as of 26 October 2026)
- Maximum breaks: 1
- Best ranking finish: Last 16 (x7)

Ross Muir (born 6 October 1995 in Edinburgh), nicknamed "Stenhouse", is a Scottish professional snooker player. He turned professional in 2013 after graduating from event two of Q School, defeating David Morris 4–0 in the final round.

== Career ==
=== Junior career ===
Muir had a very successful junior career, winning many titles including the prestigious televised Junior Pot Black at the Crucible Theatre in Sheffield by defeating Jak Jones in the final, the under 14 section of the Lt. Col Walter Rowley OBE Junior Star of the Future, the Scottish National Championship, and captained the Scottish under 16's team to glory in the 2011 Home Internationals Series in Prestatyn, Wales which was the first time Scotland had won the title since 1993. Muir won a place on the main snooker tour for the 2013–14 season after coming through the second event of the 2013 Q School, defeating David Morris 4–0 in the final round.

=== 2013/2014 ===
Muir's first match as a professional was a 5–1 loss against two-time world champion Mark Williams in qualifying for the 2013 Wuxi Classic. His first wins came in qualifying for the next event, the Australian Goldfields Open, by defeating James Cahill and Rod Lawler both 5–1, before losing 5–2 to Liam Highfield. At the Asian Tour event, the Zhangjiagang Open, he defeated world number seven Ding Junhui 4–3 in the last 32 by compiling a break of 80 in the final frame, before being whitewashed 4–0 by Da Hailin in the next round. Muir could not win a match in ranking event qualifying in the rest of the season until the final event, the World Championship, when he beat David Grace 10–6, but then lost 10–5 against Nigel Bond in the subsequent round. Muir finished his debut season on the main tour at world number 113.

=== 2014/2015 ===
Muir failed to qualify for a ranking event during the 2014–15 season. All 128 players on the tour automatically play at the venue stage of the UK Championship and Welsh Open, with Muir being knocked out in the first round 6–5 by Peter Ebdon and 4–1 by Michael White respectively. Muir threatened a comeback in the opening round of the World Championship qualifiers when he rallied from 9–4 down against Cao Yupeng to win four successive frames, but lost the next to be beaten 10–8. Muir would be relegated from the snooker tour as he is finished the season as the world number 99. However, one last 16 and two last 32 finishes in the three Asian Tour events saw him finish 18th on the Asian Order of Merit and claim the first of four places on offer for a new two-year card.

=== 2015/2016 ===
In a match lasting almost seven hours, Muir beat experienced campaigner Alan McManus 6–5 to qualify for the International Championship. It was the first time he played in a ranking event outside of the UK and he lost 6–5 to Thepchaiya Un-Nooh in the first round. Muir stated that he had been using a mind coach to help with the psychological side of the game. He won a match at the venue stage of a ranking event for the first time by edging past Mark King 6–5 at the UK Championship. The deciding frames kept coming for Muir but it was Ben Woollaston who would triumph 6–5 in the second round. He also played in the second round of the Welsh Open because of Jamie Burnett's withdrawal and lost 4–3 to Graeme Dott. Muir whitewashed Burnett 5–0 to qualify for the China Open and was knocked out 5–4 by Robert Milkins in the opening round. In the first round of the World Championship qualifying Muir beat Sean O'Sullivan 10–5, before losing to Ding Junhui 10–1 in the second round.

=== 2016/2017 ===
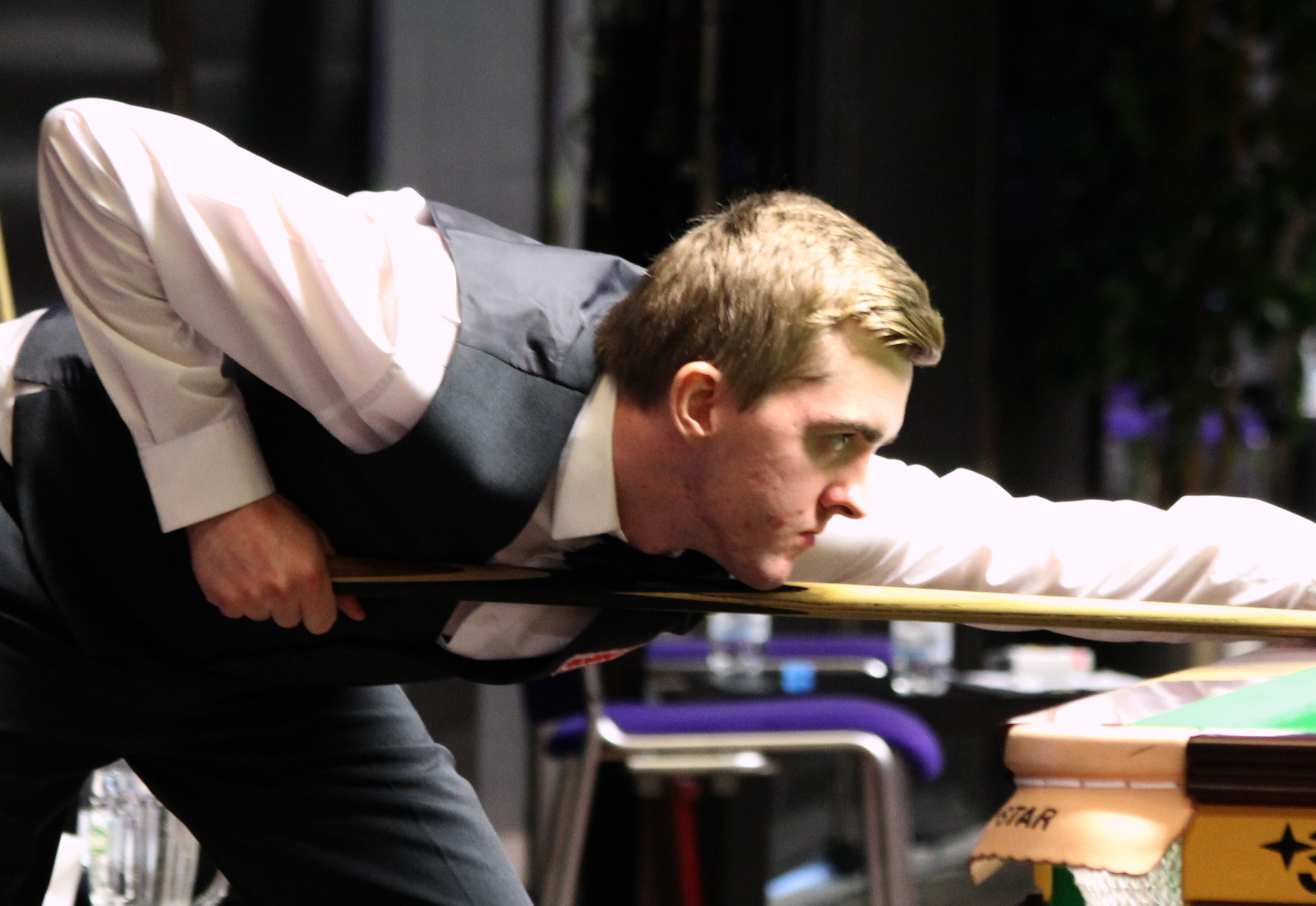
2016 Paul Hunter Classic

In the first round of the 2016 UK Championship, Muir beat Joe Swail 6–5, after having trailed 5–2. In a televised match against Ding Junhui in the next round he lost 6–2, having held a narrow 2–1 advantage. He made his first professional maximum break whilst defeating Itaro Santos 5–2 in the qualifying rounds for the German Masters. Muir then met Ali Carter who had also made a 147 on the same day and was edged out 5–4. At the Welsh Open, Muir eliminated Mark Joyce 4–3 and Marco Fu 4–0, before losing 4–1 in the third round to Zhou Yuelong. He reached the last 16 of a ranking event for the first time at the Shoot-Out, which had had its status upgraded this season, and was beaten by Anthony Hamilton. He was thrashed 5–0 by Eden Sharav in the first round of the China Open and just fell short of getting into the top 64 in the world rankings at the end of the season as he was 67th. However, Muir did enough to claim a two-year tour card on the one-year list.

=== 2018/2019 ===
In the 2018 European Masters, Muir reached the last 16 defeating Martin Gould 4–2, Lee Walker 4–2, Gary Wilson 4-2 before losing to Mark Allen 4–3. After defeating defending champion Neil Robertson 4–2 in the second round of the 2018 Scottish Open, Muir revealed he is prone to Retinal migraine issues.

=== 2019/2020 ===
After retirement at the end of the 2018/2019 season, after some improvement in health, he returned and competed in some of the second-tier, Challenge Tour. Now an amateur in status, Muir was able to enter the 2020 European Masters, but lost in the first round of qualifying to Kurt Maflin, 5–2. Muir reached the semi-finals of 2020 WSF World Championship in Malta and EBSA European Championship in Portugal.

== Personal life ==
Muir attended Musselburgh Grammar school growing up in Musselburgh, East Lothian. He was a goalkeeper in his childhood and was scouted by Celtic. He is also a keen tennis player.

== Performance and rankings timeline ==
Tournament	2011/ 12	2012/ 13	2013/ 14	2014/ 15	2015/ 16	2016/ 17	2017/ 18	2018/ 19	2019/ 20	2020/ 21	2021/ 22	2022/ 23	2023/ 24	2024/ 25	2025/ 26	2026/ 27
Ranking (Note: It shows the ranking at the beginning of the season)	(Note: He was an amateur)		(Note: New players on the Main Tour don't have a ranking)	113	(Note: Players qualified through Asian Tour Order of Merit started the season without prize money ranking points)	80	(Note: Players qualified One Year Ranking List started the season without ranking points)	90						75		84
Ranking tournaments
Championship League	Non-Ranking Event									A	RR	RR	RR	RR	RR	RR
China Open	A	A	LQ	LQ	1R	1R	LQ	LQ	Tournament Not Held							LQ
Wuhan Open	Tournament Not Held												LQ	LQ	LQ	LQ
British Open	Tournament Not Held										4R	2R	1R	LQ	LQ	2R
English Open	Tournament Not Held					2R	2R	1R	A	A	3R	A	LQ	3R	1R	2R
Shenzhen Open (Note: The event was called the Xi'an Grand Prix (2024/2025–2025/2026))	Tournament Not Held													LQ	LQ	LQ
Northern Ireland Open	Tournament Not Held					1R	3R	2R	A	A	LQ	LQ	1R	LQ	LQ	LQ
International Championship	NH	A	LQ	LQ	1R	WR	LQ	LQ	A	Not Held			2R	1R	LQ	1R
UK Championship	A	A	1R	1R	2R	2R	1R	1R	A	A	1R	LQ	LQ	LQ	LQ	
Shoot Out	Non-Ranking Event					4R	1R	1R	A	A	1R	2R	1R	1R	3R	
Scottish Open	NH	MR	Not Held			1R	1R	3R	A	A	A	A	LQ	LQ	LQ	
German Masters	A	A	LQ	LQ	LQ	LQ	LQ	LQ	A	A	LQ	1R	LQ	2R	LQ	
Welsh Open	A	A	1R	1R	2R	3R	1R	2R	A	A	LQ	1R	1R	1R	LQ	
World Grand Prix	Not Held			NR	DNQ	DNQ	DNQ	DNQ	DNQ	DNQ	DNQ	DNQ	DNQ	DNQ	DNQ	
Players Championship (Note: The event was called the Players Tour Championship Grand Final (2011/2012–2015/2016))	DNQ	DNQ	DNQ	DNQ	DNQ	DNQ	DNQ	DNQ	DNQ	DNQ	DNQ	DNQ	DNQ	DNQ	DNQ	
World Open	A	A	LQ	Not Held		LQ	LQ	LQ	A	Not Held			LQ	LQ	LQ	
Tour Championship	Tournament Not Held							DNQ	DNQ	DNQ	DNQ	DNQ	DNQ	DNQ	DNQ	
World Championship	A	A	LQ	LQ	LQ	LQ	LQ	LQ	LQ	LQ	LQ	LQ	LQ	LQ	LQ	
Former ranking tournaments
Wuxi Classic	NR	A	LQ	LQ	Tournament Not Held											
Australian Goldfields Open	A	A	LQ	LQ	LQ	Tournament Not Held										
Shanghai Masters	A	A	LQ	LQ	LQ	LQ	LQ	Non-Ranking		Not Held			Non-Ranking Event			
Paul Hunter Classic	Minor-Ranking Event					1R	1R	2R	NR	Tournament Not Held						
Indian Open	Not Held		LQ	LQ	NH	LQ	LQ	LQ	Tournament Not Held							
Riga Masters (Note: The event was called the Riga Open (2014/2015–2015/2016))	Not Held			Minor-Rank		LQ	LQ	LQ	A	Tournament Not Held						
China Championship	Tournament Not Held					NR	LQ	LQ	A	Tournament Not Held						
Turkish Masters	Tournament Not Held										LQ	Tournament Not Held				
Gibraltar Open	Tournament Not Held				MR	1R	1R	3R	A	A	2R	Tournament Not Held				
European Masters	Tournament Not Held					LQ	2R	3R	LQ	A	LQ	LQ	2R	Not Held		
Saudi Arabia Masters	Tournament Not Held													2R	2R	NH
Former non-ranking tournaments
Haining Open	Not Held			Minor-Rank		3R	2R	A	A	NH	A	A	Tournament Not Held			

Performance Table Legend
LQ	lost in the qualifying draw	#R	lost in the early rounds of the tournament (WR = Wildcard round, RR = Round robin)	QF	lost in the quarter-finals
SF	lost in the semi-finals	F	lost in the final	W	won the tournament
DNQ	did not qualify for the tournament	A	did not participate in the tournament	WD	withdrew from the tournament

NH / Not Held	means an event was not held.
NR / Non-Ranking Event	means an event is/was no longer a ranking event.
R / Ranking Event	means an event is/was a ranking event.
MR / Minor-Ranking Event	means an event is/was a minor-ranking event.

== Career finals ==
=== Pro-am finals: 4 (3 titles) ===
Outcome	Year	Championship	Opponent in the final	Score
Runner-up	2018	Vienna Snooker Open	(Cyprus) Michael Georgiou	4–5
Winner	2019	3 Kings Open	(Austria) Andreas Ploner	4–1
Winner	2019	Rheintal Open	(Austria) Andreas Ploner	3–0
Winner	2024	Italian Snooker Open	(Italy) Giuseppe Maisano	3-0

=== Amateur finals: 8 (5 titles) ===
Outcome	Year	Championship	Opponent in the final	Score
Winner	2009	Junior Pot Black	(Wales) Jak Jones	1–0
Winner	2010	Pontins Star of the Future	(England) Adam Bobat	3–1
Runner-up	2011	European Under-17 Championship	(England) Zak Barton	1–5
Runner-up	2011	Pontins Star of the Future	(Scotland) Eden Sharav	0–4
Winner	2013	Scottish Amateur Championship	(Scotland) Dylan Craig	7–3
Winner	2022	Q Tour - Event 1	(England) George Pragnell	5–2
Runner-up	2022	Q Tour - Event 6	(England) Martin O'Donnell	1–5
Winner	2023	European Amateur Championships	(Scotland) Michael Collumb	5–1
