= European Tour 2014/2015 – Event 5 =

European Tour 2014/2015 Event 5

Tournament information
- Dates: 11–14 December 2014
- Venue: Casal Vistoso Sports Centre
- City: Lisbon
- Country: Portugal
- Organisation: World Snooker
- Format: Minor-ranking event
- Total prize fund: €125,631
- Winner's share: €25,000
- Highest break: Ben Woollaston (ENG) (147)

Final
- Champion: Stephen Maguire (SCO)
- Runner-up: Matthew Selt (ENG)
- Score: 4–2

The Kreativ Dental European Tour 2014/2015 – Event 5 (also known as the 2014 Kreativ Dental Lisbon Open) was a professional minor-ranking snooker tournament that took place between 11 and 14 December 2014 at the Casal Vistoso Sports Centre in Lisbon, Portugal.

The tournament was the first ever professional snooker event in Portugal, the final of which attracted more than a thousand spectators. Over a dozen Portuguese amateur players took part, including national champion Rui Santos.

Ben Woollaston made the 110th official maximum break during his last 128 match against Joe Steele. This was Woollaston's first official 147 break and also the fifth maximum break in the 2014/2015 season.

Stephen Maguire won his third minor-ranking event by defeating Matthew Selt 4–2 in the final. The Lisbon Open was Selt's first professional final.

== Prize fund ==
The breakdown of prize money of the event is shown below:

	Prize fund
Winner	€25,000
Runner-up	€12,000
Semi-finalist	€6,000
Quarter-finalist	€4,000
Last 16	€2,300
Last 32	€1,200
Last 64	€700
Maximum break	€631
Total	€125,631

== Main draw ==
=== Preliminary rounds ===
==== Round 1 ====
Best of 7 frames

(Northern Ireland) Conor McCormack	0–4	(England) Mitchell Travis
(Isle of Man) Darryl Hill	1–4	(Scotland) Dylan Craig
(Belgium) Jeff Jacobs	4–1	(Austria) Andreas Ploner
(England) Jake Nicholson	w/o–w/d	(Wales) Jack Bradford
(England) Ryan Causton	w/o–w/d	(Wales) Mark Davies
(England) Ashley Carty	4–1	(England) Ashley Hugill
(Wales) Alex Taubman	2–4	(England) Matthew Glasby
(Republic of Ireland) Mark Dooley	0–4	(England) Adam Duffy
(England) Matthew Day	4–2	(England) Jeff Cundy
(England) Martin O'Donnell	4–2	(Scotland) Marc Davis
(Wales) Ben Jones	0–4	(England) Sean O'Sullivan
(England) Christopher Keogan	4–0	(Belgium) Daan Leysen
(Belgium) Jurian Heusdens	4–1	(Netherlands) Manon Melief
(Republic of Ireland) Dessie Sheehan	4–1	(Northern Ireland) Paul Ludden

(England) Oliver Brown	4–0	(Portugal) Telmo Falcão
(Malta) Brian Cini	4–0	(Germany) Daniel Schneider
(Portugal) Rui Santos	0–4	(Wales) Jamie Clarke
(Scotland) Chris Totten	3–4	(Portugal) João Grilo
(Portugal) Henrique Correia	1–4	(Northern Ireland) Billy Brown
(Portugal) António Ferreira	n/s–w/o	(England) Nico Elton
(Netherlands) Kevin Chan	0–4	(England) Michael Tomlinson
(England) Sydney Wilson	4–0	(Portugal) António Costa
(England) Joe O'Connor	4–2	(Portugal) Nuno Santos
(Portugal) João Silva	0–4	(England) Luke Garland
(Wales) Kishan Hirani	4–0	(Portugal) Tiago Silva
(England) Paul Davison	4–0	(England) Chris Jones
(Portugal) Luís Alves	0–4	(Republic of Ireland) Josh Boileau
(Scotland) Eden Sharav	2–4	(Germany) Felix Frede

==== Round 2 ====
Best of 7 frames

(Portugal) Alexandre Almeida	0–4	(England) Mitchell Travis
(Scotland) Dylan Craig	4–1	(Belgium) Jeff Jacobs
(England) Richard Beckham	4–3	(England) Jake Nicholson
(Wales) Gareth Allen	4–3	(England) Ryan Causton
(England) Michael Williams	0–4	(England) Ashley Carty
(England) Sanderson Lam	4–2	(England) Matthew Glasby
(Germany) Lukas Kleckers	4–2	(England) Adam Duffy
(England) Matthew Day	0–4	(England) Martin O'Donnell
(Wales) Daniel Wells	3–4	(England) Sean O'Sullivan
(England) Christopher Keogan	4–1	(Belgium) Jurian Heusdens
(Portugal) Francisco Domingues	0–4	(Republic of Ireland) Dessie Sheehan
(Scotland) Ross Higgins	0–4	(England) Oliver Brown

(England) Zack Richardson	4–2	(Malta) Brian Cini
(Portugal) Hélder Júlio	0–4	(Wales) Jamie Clarke
(Portugal) António Couto	0–4	(Portugal) João Grilo
(England) Joe Steele	4–1	(Northern Ireland) Billy Brown
(Wales) Thomas Rees	0–4	(England) Nico Elton
(Belgium) Hans Blanckaert	1–4	(England) Michael Tomlinson
(Scotland) Michael Collumb	2–4	(England) Sydney Wilson
(England) Reanne Evans	2–4	(England) Joe O'Connor
(England) William Lemons	3–4	(England) Luke Garland
(Belgium) Tomasz Skalski	4–1	(Wales) Kishan Hirani
(England) Paul Davison	2–4	(Republic of Ireland) Josh Boileau
(England) Jayson Wholly	0–4	(Germany) Felix Frede

=== Main rounds ===
==== Top half ====
===== Section 1 =====
Last 128; Best of 7 frames
(England) Shaun Murphy	1
(England) Craig Steadman	4
(England) Kyren Wilson	w/o
(Qatar) Ahmed Saif	w/d
(England) Jack Lisowski	4
(England) Mitchell Travis	1
(Northern Ireland) Joe Swail	4
(Scotland) Dylan Craig	0
(England) Stuart Bingham	4
(Wales) Andrew Pagett	0
(England) Stuart Carrington	w/d
(England) John Astley	w/o
(England) James Cahill	2
(England) Alex Davies	4
(England) Chris Wakelin	3
(England) Richard Beckham	4

Last 64; Best of 7 frames
(England) Craig Steadman	4
(England) Kyren Wilson	3
(England) Jack Lisowski	3
(Northern Ireland) Joe Swail	4
(England) Stuart Bingham	4
(England) John Astley	1
(England) Alex Davies	4
(England) Richard Beckham	2

Last 32; Best of 7 frames
(England) Craig Steadman	4
(Northern Ireland) Joe Swail	3
(England) Stuart Bingham	4
(England) Alex Davies	2

Last 16; Best of 7 frames
(England) Craig Steadman	4
(England) Stuart Bingham	0

===== Section 2 =====
Last 128; Best of 7 frames
(England) Mark Davis	4
(China) Lyu Haotian	0
(England) Liam Highfield	2
(Wales) Gareth Allen	4
(Wales) Matthew Stevens	3
(England) Alfie Burden	4
(England) Mark King	4
(England) Ashley Carty	1
(Thailand) Dechawat Poomjaeng	1
(Australia) Vinnie Calabrese	4
(Wales) Jak Jones	0
(England) Joel Walker	4
(England) Oliver Lines	4
(China) Lu Ning (Note: A match-fixing investigation undertaken in 2023 found that Lu had agreed to fix the outcome of this match, for which he accepted to be true.)	2
(Wales) Michael White	3
(Republic of Ireland) David Morris	4

Last 64; Best of 7 frames
(England) Mark Davis	4
(Wales) Gareth Allen	1
(England) Alfie Burden	3
(England) Mark King	4
(Australia) Vinnie Calabrese	1
(England) Joel Walker	4
(England) Oliver Lines	4
(Republic of Ireland) David Morris	1

Last 32; Best of 7 frames
(England) Mark Davis	4
(England) Mark King	3
(England) Joel Walker	4
(England) Oliver Lines	1

Last 16; Best of 7 frames
(England) Mark Davis	4
(England) Joel Walker	1

===== Section 3 =====
Last 128; Best of 7 frames
(Scotland) Stephen Maguire	4
(England) Sanderson Lam	3
(England) Mark Joyce	3
(Finland) Robin Hull	4
(Scotland) Scott Donaldson	1
(England) Barry Pinches	4
(England) Robbie Williams	4
(China) Yu Delu	2
(England) Jimmy Robertson	4
(Scotland) Michael Leslie	0
(Scotland) John Higgins	4
(Germany) Lukas Kleckers	1
(England) Allan Taylor	4
(England) Martin O'Donnell	2
(Belgium) Luca Brecel	4
(Thailand) Ratchayothin Yotharuck	2

Last 64; Best of 7 frames
(Scotland) Stephen Maguire	4
(Finland) Robin Hull	1
(England) Barry Pinches	4
(England) Robbie Williams	1
(England) Jimmy Robertson	1
(Scotland) John Higgins	4
(England) Allan Taylor	4
(Belgium) Luca Brecel	2

Last 32; Best of 7 frames
(Scotland) Stephen Maguire	4
(England) Barry Pinches	0
(Scotland) John Higgins	4
(England) Allan Taylor	1

Last 16; Best of 7 frames
(Scotland) Stephen Maguire	4
(Scotland) John Higgins	2

===== Section 4 =====
Last 128; Best of 7 frames
(Scotland) Alan McManus	w/d
(Scotland) Ross Muir	w/o
(England) Nigel Bond	w/o
(China) Lu Chenwei	w/d
(England) David Grace	3
(Thailand) Noppon Saengkham	4
(China) Liang Wenbo	2
(England) Mitchell Mann	4
(China) Tian Pengfei	2
(Norway) Kurt Maflin	4
(England) Gary Wilson	4
(China) Zhou Yuelong	2
(Northern Ireland) Gerard Greene	4
(England) Michael Georgiou	2
(England) Rod Lawler	4
(England) Sean O'Sullivan	1

Last 64; Best of 7 frames
(Scotland) Ross Muir	4
(England) Nigel Bond	1
(Thailand) Noppon Saengkham	4
(England) Mitchell Mann	3
(Norway) Kurt Maflin	4
(England) Gary Wilson	0
(Northern Ireland) Gerard Greene	3
(England) Rod Lawler	4

Last 32; Best of 7 frames
(Scotland) Ross Muir	1
(Thailand) Noppon Saengkham	4
(Norway) Kurt Maflin	4
(England) Rod Lawler	3

Last 16; Best of 7 frames
(Thailand) Noppon Saengkham	4
(Norway) Kurt Maflin	3

==== Bottom half ====
===== Section 5 =====
Last 128; Best of 7 frames
(England) Robert Milkins	1
(England) Ian Burns	4
(China) Xiao Guodong	4
(England) Christopher Keogan	1
(England) Jimmy White	4
(Republic of Ireland) Dessie Sheehan	0
(Wales) Jamie Jones	4
(England) Oliver Brown	2
(Republic of Ireland) Fergal O'Brien	4
(China) Cao Yupeng	1
(England) Joe Perry	4
(China) Zhang Anda	0
(England) Ian Glover	0
(England) Zack Richardson	4
(Scotland) Anthony McGill	3
(Wales) Jamie Clarke	4

Last 64; Best of 7 frames
(England) Ian Burns	2
(China) Xiao Guodong	4
(England) Jimmy White	1
(Wales) Jamie Jones	4
(Republic of Ireland) Fergal O'Brien	3
(England) Joe Perry	4
(England) Zack Richardson	2
(Wales) Jamie Clarke	4

Last 32; Best of 7 frames
(China) Xiao Guodong	1
(Wales) Jamie Jones	4
(England) Joe Perry	4
(Wales) Jamie Clarke	1

Last 16; Best of 7 frames
(Wales) Jamie Jones	3
(England) Joe Perry	4

===== Section 6 =====
Last 128; Best of 7 frames
(England) Barry Hawkins	4
(England) Chris Norbury	1
(England) Chris Melling	3
(England) Rory McLeod	4
(England) Andrew Higginson	4
(England) Lee Page	1
(England) Mike Dunn	1
(England) Dave Harold	4
(Scotland) Fraser Patrick	4
(Switzerland) Alexander Ursenbacher	2
(England) Michael Holt	4
(Portugal) João Grilo	1
(England) Ben Woollaston	4
(England) Joe Steele	0
(England) Peter Ebdon	4
(England) Nico Elton	0

Last 64; Best of 7 frames
(England) Barry Hawkins	4
(England) Rory McLeod	2
(England) Andrew Higginson	4
(England) Dave Harold	2
(Scotland) Fraser Patrick	2
(England) Michael Holt	4
(England) Ben Woollaston	3
(England) Peter Ebdon	4

Last 32; Best of 7 frames
(England) Barry Hawkins	4
(England) Andrew Higginson	0
(England) Michael Holt	1
(England) Peter Ebdon	4

Last 16; Best of 7 frames
(England) Barry Hawkins	4
(England) Peter Ebdon	3

===== Section 7 =====
Last 128; Best of 7 frames
(England) Ricky Walden	4
(Scotland) Marcus Campbell	2
(Wales) Ryan Day	4
(China) Li Hang	1
(Scotland) Graeme Dott	4
(England) Michael Tomlinson	2
(England) Matthew Selt	4
(China) Cao Xinlong	0
(England) Jamie Cope	4
(England) Zak Surety	2
(England) David Gilbert	4
(England) Sydney Wilson	2
(Wales) Dominic Dale	4
(England) Joe O'Connor	0
(Hong Kong) Marco Fu	4
(England) Steven Hallworth	0

Last 64; Best of 7 frames
(England) Ricky Walden	3
(Wales) Ryan Day	4
(Scotland) Graeme Dott	1
(England) Matthew Selt	4
(England) Jamie Cope	2
(England) David Gilbert	4
(Wales) Dominic Dale	4
(Hong Kong) Marco Fu	0

Last 32; Best of 7 frames
(Wales) Ryan Day	2
(England) Matthew Selt	4
(England) David Gilbert	1
(Wales) Dominic Dale	4

Last 16; Best of 7 frames
(England) Matthew Selt	4
(Wales) Dominic Dale	1

===== Section 8 =====
Last 128; Best of 7 frames
(England) Michael Wasley	w/o
(England) Ali Carter	w/d
(England) Sam Baird	4
(England) Luke Garland	2
(England) Elliot Slessor	4
(England) Peter Lines	2
(India) Aditya Mehta	4
(England) Hammad Miah	1
(Wales) Mark Williams	4
(Belgium) Tomasz Skalski	1
(England) Anthony Hamilton	4
(Republic of Ireland) Josh Boileau	0
(Thailand) Thepchaiya Un-Nooh	4
(Germany) Felix Frede	1
(England) Judd Trump	4
(England) Tom Ford	0

Last 64; Best of 7 frames
(England) Michael Wasley	3
(England) Sam Baird	4
(England) Elliot Slessor	0
(India) Aditya Mehta	4
(Wales) Mark Williams	4
(England) Anthony Hamilton	3
(Thailand) Thepchaiya Un-Nooh	0
(England) Judd Trump	4

Last 32; Best of 7 frames
(England) Sam Baird	1
(India) Aditya Mehta	4
(Wales) Mark Williams	3
(England) Judd Trump	4

Last 16; Best of 7 frames
(India) Aditya Mehta	2
(England) Judd Trump	4

==== Finals ====
Quarter-finals; Best of 7 frames		Semi-finals; Best of 7 frames		Final; Best of 7 frames
(England) Craig Steadman	3
(England) Mark Davis	4	(England) Mark Davis	0
(Scotland) Stephen Maguire	4	(Scotland) Stephen Maguire	4
(Thailand) Noppon Saengkham	2			(Scotland) Stephen Maguire	4
(England) Joe Perry	2			(England) Matthew Selt	2
(England) Barry Hawkins	4	(England) Barry Hawkins	2
(England) Matthew Selt	4	(England) Matthew Selt	4
(England) Judd Trump	1

== Century breaks ==
- 147 – Ben Woollaston
- 143 – Barry Hawkins
- 141, 101 – Matthew Stevens
- 140, 104, 100 – Alfie Burden
- 139, 116 – Judd Trump
- 138 – Marco Fu
- 137, 123 – Andrew Higginson
- 131, 117, 101 – John Higgins
- 131, 114 – Kurt Maflin
- 128 – Mitchell Mann
- 125 – Jamie Jones
- 122, 115 – Craig Steadman
- 119, 118 – Aditya Mehta
- 118 – Joe Perry
- 112 – Allan Taylor
- 110, 102, 100 – Stephen Maguire
- 110 – Gerard Greene
- 109 – Thepchaiya Un-Nooh
- 108 – Anthony Hamilton
- 106 – Michael Holt
- 106 – Graeme Dott
- 105, 101 – Dominic Dale
- 105 – Marcus Campbell
- 105 – Richard Beckham
- 105 – Tian Pengfei
- 105 – Jack Lisowski
- 104 – Chris Melling
- 104 – Mark King
- 104 – Mark Davis
- 103 – Joe Swail
- 103 – Alex Davies
- 103 – Peter Ebdon
- 101 – Xiao Guodong
- 100, 100 – David Gilbert
