= Larkov =

Larkov is a surname. Notable people with the surname include:

- Andrey Larkov (born 1989), Russian cross-country skier
- Mykhailo Larkov (born 2009), Ukrainian snooker and billiards player
