= 2020 Championship League =

2020 Championship League may refer to:

- 2020 Championship League (June 2020), a non-ranking snooker tournament held in June 2020
- 2020 Championship League (ranking), a ranking snooker tournament held in September and October 2020
