= Craig Steadman =

English snooker player (born 1982)

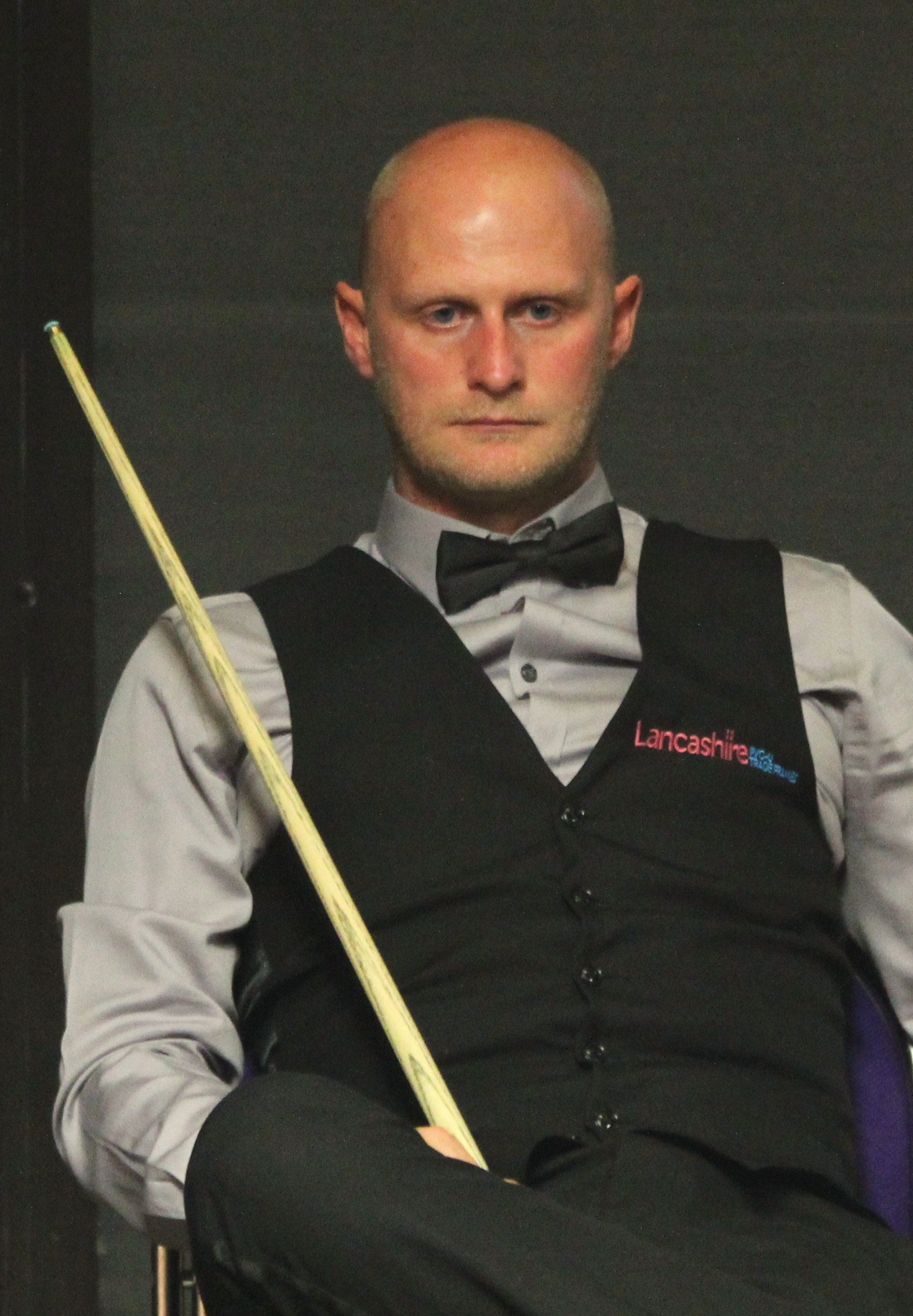
- Steadman at the 2016 Paul Hunter Classic

Personal information
- Born: 14 July 1982 (age 44) Farnworth, England

Sport
- Country: England
- Sport: Snooker
- Professional: 2009/2010, 2012–2020, 2021–2023, 2026–present
- Highest ranking: 66 (July–August 2015, March 2016)
- Current ranking: 119 (as of 4 October 2026)
- Best ranking finish: Semi-final (2021 Snooker Shoot Out)

Craig Steadman (born 14 July 1982) is an English professional snooker player.

== Career ==
=== Early career ===
Steadman began his professional career by playing Challenge Tour in 2001, at the time the second-level professional tour. He reached the quarter final at the 2006 IBSF World Championships in Amman, Jordan, where he was eliminated by Manan Chandra 6–3. He reached the final of the 2008 European Snooker Championships but was defeated 7–6 by David Grace. He first entered Main Tour for the 2009–10 season, after finishing the 2008/09 PIOS rankings on the rank 8. On 23 May 2009 he won the English Team Championship with Manchester.

=== 2011/2012 season ===
He made it to the main draw of a ranking event for the first time in 2012, by beating Mike Dunn 5–3 in the wildcard round for the German Masters. He played Matthew Stevens in the first round, but was comfortably beaten 5–1. Despite not being on the main snooker tour Steadman played in all 12 of the minor-ranking Players Tour Championship events throughout the season, reaching the last 32 on four occasions. These performances were enough to see him earn a place back on the tour for the 2012–13 season. Steadman decided to accept the invitation back on to the main tour only at the last minute, as he felt snooker was distracting him from his main career as a professional artist.

=== 2012/2013 season ===
Steadman took advantage of a new flatter structure used in the qualifiers for the 2013 Welsh Open, whereby he would only need to win two matches to reach the venue by defeating Yu Delu and Jamie Burnett with the loss of only one frame. However, in Newport he was whitewashed 0–4 by Stuart Bingham. Steadman played in all ten PTC's this season, with his best results being three last 32 defeats to finish 65th on the Order of Merit. His season ended when he lost 6–10 to Kurt Maflin in the second round of World Championship Qualifying to finish the year ranked world number 83.

=== 2013/2014 season ===
In his opening match, Steadman defeated Marcus Campbell 5–3 to qualify for the 2013 Wuxi Classic in China where he faced Lü Haotian in the first round and lost 5–3. He also qualified for the International Championship and World Open, but lost in the opening round of each. At the China Open, Steadman beat Michael Holt and Martin O'Donnell to advance to the last 16 of a ranking event for the first time, where he was defeated 5–2 by Mike Dunn. In qualifying for the World Championship, Steadman saw off Jak Jones 10–7 to play Steve Davis in the second round. He led 9–5 before Davis won three frames in a row but Steadman then took a 46-minute 18th frame on the colours to win 10–8, in a result that relegated six-time world champion Davis from the main tour. Steadman himself lost his place on the tour in the next round when he was defeated 10–6 by Dechawat Poomjaeng as he was ranked world number 78, outside of the top 64. He entered the 2014 Q School and dropped just two frames in his five matches of the first event to earn a new two-year tour card for the 2014–15 and 2015–16 seasons.

=== 2014/2015 season ===
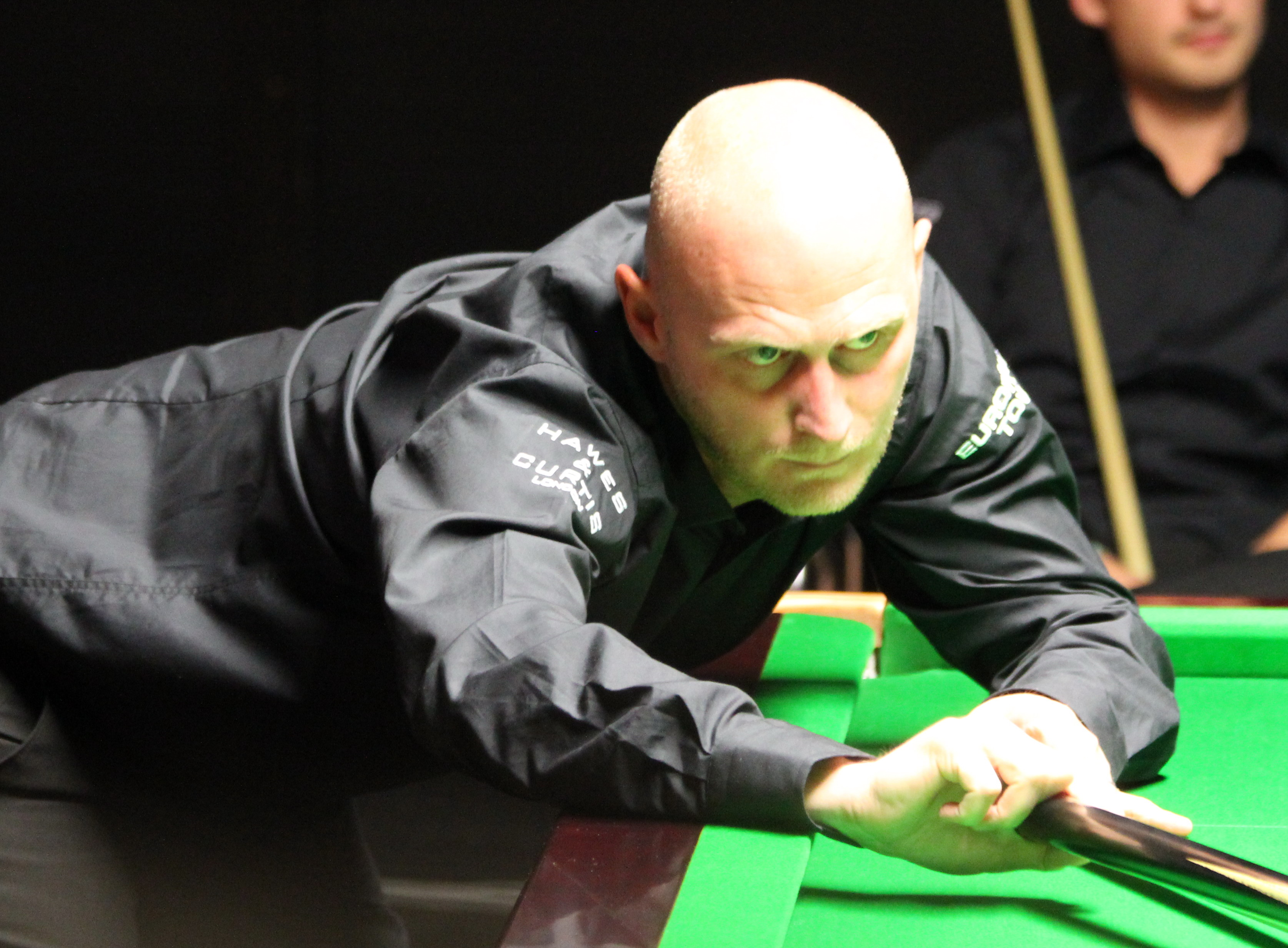
2014 Paul Hunter Classic

Steadman began the 2014–15 season by qualifying for the Wuxi Classic for the second year in a row and was beaten 5–2 by Marco Fu in the first round. He also qualified for the International Championship by defeating Cao Yupeng 6–4 and he saw off Graeme Dott 6–1 in the first round, before losing 6–3 to Ian Burns. Despite Anthony Hamilton being docked a frame for arriving late to their first round UK Championship meeting, Steadman was edged out 6–5 in a scrappy six-and-a-half-hour match. Steadman described his performance as pathetic afterwards, but responded in his very next event the Lisbon Open. He began the tournament with a 4–1 win over Shaun Murphy, a player who had won the last two European Tour events, and then earned a pair of deciding frame victories against Kyren Wilson (came back from 3–0 down to win 4–3) and Joe Swail (came back from 3–1 down to win 4–3). Steadman then whitewashed Stuart Bingham 4–0 to reach his first quarter-final in a professional event, where he lost 4–3 to Mark Davis.

In April, Steadman qualified for the televised stages of the World Championship for the first time, courtesy of wins over Rhys Clark, Michael White and Jamie Burnett. He described playing five-time winner of the event Ronnie O'Sullivan in the first round an honour and was defeated 10–3.

=== 2015/2016 season ===
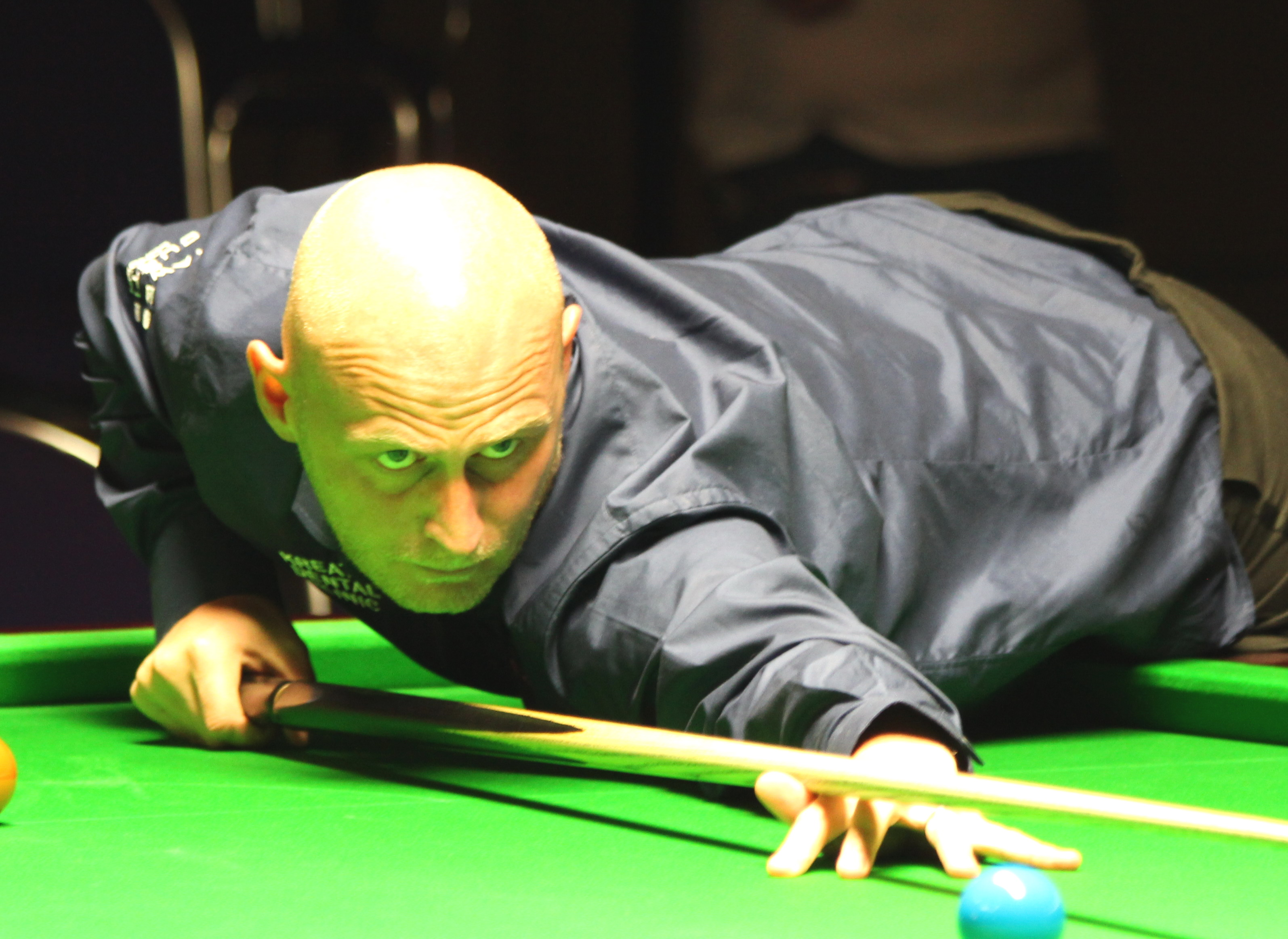
2015 Paul Hunter Classic

A 6–2 triumph over Li Hang saw Steadman qualify for the International Championship for the third successive year, but he lost 6–2 to Ding Junhui in the opening round. He also lost in the first round of both the UK Championship (6–3 to Zhou Yuelong) and Welsh Open (4–1 to Dechawat Poomjaeng). Steadman was knocked out in the fifth round of first event of the 2016 Q School and the final round of the second event. This meant that he earned a new two-year tour card by ending in first place on the Q School Order of Merit.

=== 2016/2017 season ===
Steadman lost in the second round of three events in the first half of the 2016–17 season and also let 3–0 and 5–3 leads slip against Anthony McGill in the first round of the UK Championship to be defeated 6–5. His best form of the year came at the Welsh Open, where he reached the last 16 of an event for the second time in his career after eliminating Jak Jones 4–2, Sam Baird 4–1 and Anthony Hamilton 4–2. However, he was then whitewashed 4–0 by Barry Hawkins.

=== 2017/2018 season ===
Steadman reached the third round of three ranking events throughout the 2017–18 season. However, he wasn't able to accumulate enough ranking points by the end of the season and was thus relegated from the tour. He entered 2018 Q School in a bid to re-enter the professional snooker tour. He did so defeating Adam Duffy 4–0 in the final round of the second event.

=== 2020/2021 season ===
Steadman this season competed as an amateur and in the Shoot Out he made it to the semi-finals. His previous best in a ranking event was the last 16. He did not participate in qualifying for the World Championships.

== Performance and rankings timeline ==
Tournament	1999/ 00	2000/ 01	2001/ 02	2002/ 03	2003/ 04	2004/ 05	2009/ 10	2010/ 11	2011/ 12	2012/ 13	2013/ 14	2014/ 15	2015/ 16	2016/ 17	2017/ 18	2018/ 19	2019/ 20	2020/ 21	2021/ 22	2022/ 23	2023/ 24	2024/ 25	2025/ 26	2026/ 27
Ranking (Note: It shows the ranking at the beginning of the season)	(Note: He was an amateur)						(Note: New players on the Main Tour don't have a ranking)				83	(Note: Players qualified through Q School started the season without ranking points)	73		82		72			80				
Ranking tournaments
Championship League	Tournament Not Held						Non-Ranking Event											A	2R	RR	RR	WD	RR	RR
China Open	A	A	A	Not Held		A	LQ	A	A	LQ	3R	LQ	LQ	LQ	1R	2R	Tournament Not Held							LQ
Wuhan Open	Tournament Not Held																				A	A	A	LQ
British Open	A	A	A	A	A	A	Tournament Not Held												1R	2R	A	A	A	LQ
English Open	Tournament Not Held													2R	2R	3R	1R	A	LQ	1R	A	A	A	LQ
Shenzhen Open (Note: The event was called the Xi'an Grand Prix (2024/2025–2025/2026))	Tournament Not Held																					A	A	LQ
Northern Ireland Open	Tournament Not Held													2R	1R	1R	2R	A	LQ	1R	A	A	A	LQ
International Championship	Tournament Not Held									LQ	1R	2R	1R	LQ	LQ	1R	LQ	Not Held			A	A	A	LQ
UK Championship	A	A	A	A	A	A	LQ	A	A	LQ	1R	1R	1R	1R	1R	1R	1R	A	1R	LQ	LQ	LQ	A	
Shoot Out	Tournament Not Held							Non-Ranking Event						1R	1R	2R	4R	SF	2R	1R	A	A	1R	
Scottish Open (Note: The event was called the Players Championship (2003/2004))	A	A	A	A	A	Tournament Not Held				MR	Not Held			1R	3R	1R	1R	A	1R	LQ	A	A	A	
German Masters	Tournament Not Held							A	1R	LQ	LQ	LQ	LQ	LQ	LQ	LQ	LQ	A	2R	LQ	A	A	A	
Welsh Open	A	A	A	A	A	A	LQ	A	A	1R	2R	1R	1R	4R	3R	3R	1R	A	1R	LQ	A	A	A	
World Grand Prix	Tournament Not Held											NR	DNQ	DNQ	DNQ	DNQ	DNQ	DNQ	DNQ	DNQ	DNQ	DNQ	DNQ	
Players Championship (Note: The event was called the Players Tour Championship Grand Final (2010/2011–2015/2016))	Tournament Not Held							DNQ	DNQ	DNQ	DNQ	DNQ	DNQ	DNQ	DNQ	DNQ	DNQ	DNQ	DNQ	DNQ	DNQ	DNQ	DNQ	
World Open (Note: The event was called the Grand Prix (1999/2000–2000/2001 and 2004/2005–2009/2010) and the LG Cup (2001/2002–2003/2004))	A	A	A	A	A	A	LQ	A	A	LQ	1R	Not Held		LQ	LQ	LQ	2R	Not Held			A	A	A	
Tour Championship	Tournament Not Held															DNQ	DNQ	DNQ	DNQ	DNQ	DNQ	DNQ	DNQ	
World Championship	LQ	LQ	LQ	LQ	LQ	LQ	LQ	A	A	LQ	LQ	1R	LQ	LQ	LQ	LQ	LQ	A	LQ	LQ	A	A	LQ	
Non-ranking tournaments
The Masters	A	A	LQ	LQ	A	A	LQ	A	A	A	A	A	A	A	A	A	A	A	A	A	A	A	A	
Championship League	Tournament Not Held						A	A	A	A	A	A	A	A	A	A	RR	A	A	A	A	A	A	
Former ranking tournaments
Wuxi Classic (Note: The event was called the Jiangsu Classic (2009/2010))	Tournament Not Held						Non-Ranking Event			LQ	1R	1R	Tournament Not Held											
Australian Goldfields Open	Tournament Not Held								A	LQ	LQ	LQ	LQ	Tournament Not Held										
Shanghai Masters	Tournament Not Held						LQ	A	A	LQ	LQ	LQ	LQ	LQ	LQ	Non-Ranking		Not Held			Non-Ranking Event			
Paul Hunter Classic (Note: The event was called the Grand Prix Fürth (2004/2005))	Tournament Not Held					Pro-Am		Minor-Ranking Event						2R	3R	3R	NR	Tournament Not Held						
Indian Open	Tournament Not Held										LQ	LQ	NH	LQ	LQ	2R	Tournament Not Held							
Riga Masters (Note: The event was called the Riga Open (2014/2015–2015/2016))	Tournament Not Held											Minor-Rank		LQ	2R	3R	1R	Tournament Not Held						
China Championship	Tournament Not Held													NR	LQ	LQ	LQ	Tournament Not Held						
Turkish Masters	Tournament Not Held																		LQ	Tournament Not Held				
Gibraltar Open	Tournament Not Held												MR	2R	2R	1R	2R	A	1R	Tournament Not Held				
WST Classic	Tournament Not Held																			1R	Tournament Not Held			
European Masters (Note: The event was called the European Open (2001/2002–2003/2004) and the Malta Cup (2004/2005))	Not Held		A	A	A	A	Tournament Not Held							LQ	LQ	2R	LQ	A	LQ	LQ	A	Not Held		
Former non-ranking tournaments
Merseyside Professional Championship	A	A	1R	A	A	3R	Tournament Not Held																	
Six-red World Championship (Note: The event was called the Six-red World Grand Prix (2009–2010))	Tournament Not Held						A	A	NH	A	A	A	A	A	A	A	A	Not Held		LQ	Tournament Not Held			
Haining Open	Tournament Not Held											Minor-Rank		3R	2R	A	3R	NH	A	A	Tournament Not Held			

Performance Table Legend
LQ	lost in the qualifying draw	#R	lost in the early rounds of the tournament (WR = Wildcard round, RR = Round robin)	QF	lost in the quarter-finals
SF	lost in the semi-finals	F	lost in the final	W	won the tournament
DNQ	did not qualify for the tournament	A	did not participate in the tournament	WD	withdrew from the tournament

NH / Not Held	means an event was not held.
NR / Non-Ranking Event	means an event is/was no longer a ranking event.
R / Ranking Event	means an event is/was a ranking event.
MR / Minor-Ranking Event	means an event is/was a minor-ranking event.
PA / Pro-am Event	means an event is/was a pro-am event.

== Career finals ==
=== Pro-am finals: 8 (2 titles) ===
Outcome	No.	Year	Championship	Opponent in the final	Score
Runner-up	1.	2007	Pontins Pro-Am - Event 1	(England) Andrew Norman	2–4
Winner	1.	2008	Pontins Autumn Open	(Republic of Ireland) Leo Fernandez	5–0
Runner-up	2.	2008	Pontins World Series Grand Final	(England) Jamie Cope	1–4
Runner-up	3.	2012	Paul Hunter English Open	(England) Adam Duffy	3–6
Runner-up	4.	2013	Paul Hunter English Open (2)	(England) Stuart Carrington	3–5
Runner-up	5.	2013	Vienna Snooker Open	(England) Mark King	0–5
Winner	2.	2019	Independence Day Cup	(Poland) Mateusz Baranowski	4–0
Runner-up	6.	2024	Vienna Snooker Open (2)	(Switzerland) Alexander Ursenbacher	4–5

=== Amateur finals: 8 (1 title) ===
Outcome	No.	Year	Championship	Opponent in the final	Score
Runner-up	1.	2004	English Open	(England) Judd Trump	7–8
Runner-up	2.	2007	PIOS – Event 7	(Belgium) Bjorn Haneveer	2–6
Winner	1.	2008	PIOS – Event 4	(England) Mike Hallett	6–1
Runner-up	3.	2008	European Snooker Championship	(England) David Grace	6–7
Runner-up	4.	2023	Q Tour – Event 1	(Wales) Liam Davies	2–5
Runner-up	5.	2024	Q Tour – Event 3	(China) Zhao Xintong	3–4
Runner-up	6.	2025	Q Tour – Event 4	(Wales) Jamie Clarke	2–4
Runner-up	7.	2026	Q Tour – Event 6	(Wales) Ashley Carty	1–4
