= 2025–26 Q Tour =

Series of snooker tournaments

Details
- Duration: 19 June 2025 – 17 March 2026
- Tournaments: 21; Organised by WPBSA: Q Tour Europe (7); Q Tour Global Play-Offs; Regional organisers: Q Tour Americas (4); Q Tour Asia-Pacific (5); Q Tour Middle East (4)

Play-offs and winners
- Location: Gandía, Spain
- Promoted: Jamie Clarke (WAL); Ashley Carty (ENG); Ashley Hugill (ENG); Craig Steadman (ENG)

The 2025–26 Q Tour was a multi-regional series of second-tier snooker tournaments, run by the World Professional Billiards and Snooker Association (WPBSA). It took place during the 2025–26 snooker season for players not on the main tour.

Jamie Clarke led the Q Tour Europe rankings to gain a place on the main tour, followed by Ashley Carty, Ashley Hugill and Craig Steadman who have won their respective play-offs. It is the first time only English and Welsh players are promoted to the main tour since the expansion of Q Tour in the 2023–24 season.

== Overview ==
A series of seven Q Tour Europe events were played, with the leading money-winner gaining a place on the main tour for the 2026–27 snooker season. Eighteen players – the highest-ranked players who have not already secured a place on the main tour for the 2026–27 season – gained entry to a further event, the WPBSA Q Tour Global Play-Off. They are joined by five players from the Regional Q Tour winners outside Europe and one player from the CBSA China Tour third-ranked. These players will compete for a further three places on the World Snooker Tour.

This season saw increase of prize money, more than doubled from £14,300 last season to £30,000 per event. An extended event duration from three to four days, along with a new seeding structure and points-based system, was also introduced.

== Q Tour Europe ==
=== Format ===
Q Tour Europe events were generally played over four days. The main draw starts on the second day when the 16 successful qualifiers are joined by the 48 seeded players who qualified based on their rankings in the 2025 Q School Orders of Merit to make a first round field of 64 players. There are two rounds on the second day and a further four on the final day, to determine the winner of the event. The 48 who qualified directly included the top 32 eligible players from the 2025 UK Q School Order of Merit, the top eight from the 2025 Asia-Oceania Q School Order of Merit, and the eight highest ranked junior players on the 2025 UK Q School Order of Merit, not already qualified.

=== Prize fund ===
Each Q Tour Europe event featured a prize fund of £30,000, with the winner receiving £6,000.

- Winner: £6,000
- Runner-up: £3,000
- Semi-final: £2,000
- Quarter-final: £1,250
- Last 16: £750
- Last 32: £350
- Total: £30,000

=== Schedule ===
The schedule for the Q Tour Europe events is given below.

| Date | | Country | Tournament | Venue | City | Field | Winner | Runner-up | Score | Ref. |
|---|---|---|---|---|---|---|---|---|---|---|
| 29 Aug | 31 Aug | SWE | Event 1 | Snookerhallen | Stockholm | 94 | (England) Hammad Miah | (England) Patrick Whelan | 4–2 | |
| 25 Sep | 28 Sep | AUT | Event 2 | Austrian Snooker Academy | Vienna | 117 | (England) Peter Lines | (England) Peter Devlin | 4–3 | |
| 9 Oct | 12 Oct | ALB | Event 3 (Note: Held as part of the 2025 Autumn EBSA European Snooker Championships.) | Grand Blue Fafa Resort | Kafaje | 104 | (England) Simon Blackwell | (England) Mark Joyce | 4–3 | |
| 29 Oct | 1 Nov | ENG | Event 4 | Northern Snooker Centre | Leeds | 139 | (Wales) Jamie Clarke | (England) Craig Steadman | 4–2 | |
| 5 Dec | 7 Dec | BUL | Event 5 | Bulgarian Snooker Academy | Sofia | 93 | (Wales) Jamie Clarke | (England) Stuart Carrington | 4–2 | |
| 13 Feb | 15 Feb | BEL | Event 6 | Delta Moon Snooker Club | Mons | 78 | (England) Ashley Carty | (England) Craig Steadman | 4–1 | |
| 26 Feb | 1 Mar | ENG | Event 7 | Landywood Snooker Club | Great Wyrley | 106 | (England) Ashley Hugill | (Wales) Alfie Davies | 4–2 | |

=== Rankings ===
Below are listed the leading players in the rankings. A new points-based system was introduced to replace the previous system which was based on prize money.

| Rank | Player | Event 1 | Event 2 | Event 3 | Event 4 | Event 5 | Event 6 | Event 7 | Total |
|---|---|---|---|---|---|---|---|---|---|
| 1 | (Wales) Jamie Clarke * | 1,680 | 3,430 | 3,430 | 10,000 | 10,000 | 1,680 | 3,430 | 33,650 |
| 2 | (England) Hammad Miah ^ | 10,000 | 0 | 4,900 | 4,900 | 2,400 | 2,400 | 2,400 | 27,000 |
| 3 | (England) Peter Lines + | 4,900 | 10,000 | 2,400 | 3,430 | 3,430 | 1,680 | 0 | 25,840 |
| 4 | (England) Oliver Sykes ^ | 3,430 | 3,430 | 4,900 | 1,680 | 4,900 | 4,900 | 2,400 | 25,640 |
| 5 | (England) Craig Steadman % | 3,430 | 2,400 | 0 | 7,000 | 2,400 | 7,000 | 1,680 | 23,910 |
| 6 | (England) Stuart Carrington + | 1,680 | 1,680 | 3,430 | 4,900 | 7,000 | 2,400 | 2,400 | 23,490 |
| 7 | (England) Ashley Hugill % | 0 | 4,900 | 0 | 1,680 | 1,680 | 4,900 | 10,000 | 23,160 |
| 8 | (England) Ashley Carty % | 1,680 | 1,175 | 2,400 | 2,400 | 1,680 | 10,000 | 2,400 | 21,735 |
| 9 | (England) Simon Blackwell + | 2,400 | 0 | 10,000 | 2,400 | 3,430 | 1,680 | 1,680 | 21,590 |
| 10 | (Wales) Alfie Davies + | 2,400 | 3,430 | 2,400 | 1,175 | 3,430 | 0 | 7,000 | 19,835 |
| 11 | (England) George Pragnell + | 0 | 4,900 | 3,430 | 2,400 | 2,400 | 3,430 | 1,680 | 18,240 |
| 12 | (England) Patrick Whelan + | 7,000 | 1,680 | 1,680 | 1,680 | 1,680 | 2,400 | 1,680 | 17,800 |
| 13 | (England) Mark Joyce + | – | 1,680 | 7,000 | 1,680 | 3,430 | – | 1,680 | 15,470 |
| 14 | (Australia) Ryan Thomerson + | 2,400 | 1,175 | 3,430 | 1,680 | 2,400 | 2,400 | 1,680 | 15,165 |
| 15 | (England) Luke Pinches + | 1,175 | 1,680 | 2,400 | 1,680 | 1,680 | 1,680 | 3,430 | 13,725 |
| 16 | (England) Barry Pinches + | 3,430 | 2,400 | 0 | 2,400 | 1,680 | – | 3,430 | 13,340 |
| 17 | (England) Alex Millington + | 1,175 | 2,400 | 1,680 | 1,175 | 1,680 | 3,430 | 1,680 | 13,220 |
| 18 | (England) Alfie Burden ^ | 3,430 | 0 | 1,680 | 2,400 | 4,900 | 0 | 0 | 12,410 |
| 19 | (England) Andrew Higginson + | 0 | 2,400 | 1,680 | 1,175 | 1,680 | 3,430 | 1,680 | 12,045 |
| 20 | (Ukraine) Michael Larkov ^ | 4,900 | 1,680 | 0 | 1,175 | 2,400 | 1,680 | – | 11,835 |
| 21 | (England) Peter Devlin + | 0 | 7,000 | 2,400 | 0 | 0 | 2,400 | 0 | 11,800 |
| 22 | (England) Hayden Staniland + | 1,175 | 1,680 | 1,175 | 1,175 | 1,680 | 2,400 | 2,400 | 11,685 |
| 23 | (England) Sean O'Sullivan + ^ | 1,680 | 2,400 | 1,680 | 2,400 | 1,680 | 1,680 | 0 | 11,520 |
| 24 | (Wales) Oliver Briffett-Payne + | – | 2,400 | 1,175 | 3,430 | 1,680 | 1,680 | 0 | 10,365 |
| 25 | (England) Callum Beresford + | – | 1,680 | 2,400 | 2,400 | 0 | 1,680 | 1,175 | 9,335 |
| 26 | (England) Daniel Womersley + | 1,680 | 1,175 | 0 | 1,175 | 1,680 | 2,400 | 1,175 | 9,285 |

* Qualified for the main tour by order of merit
^ Qualified for the main tour through other means
% Qualified for the main tour as play-off winner
+ Qualified for the play-offs

=== Event 1 ===
The first Q Tour Europe event took place at the Snookerhallen in Stockholm from 29 to 31 August 2025. Hammad Miah beat Patrick Whelan 4–2 in the final. The final-day results are given below.

Quarter-finals; Best of 7 frames
Alfie Burden (ENG) | 1
Hammad Miah (ENG) | 4
Craig Steadman (ENG) | 0
Peter Lines (ENG) | 4
Barry Pinches (ENG) | 1
Michael Larkov (UKR) | 4
Oliver Sykes (ENG) | 3
Patrick Whelan (ENG) | 4

Semi-finals; Best of 7 frames
(England) Hammad Miah | 4
(England) Peter Lines | 2
(Ukraine) Michael Larkov | 2
(England) Patrick Whelan | 4

Final; Best of 7 frames
(England) Hammad Miah | 4
(England) Patrick Whelan | 2

=== Event 2 ===
The second Q Tour Europe event took place at the Austrian Snooker Academy in Vienna from 25 to 28 September 2025. Peter Lines beat Peter Devlin 4–3 in the final. The final-day results are given below.

Quarter-finals; Best of 7 frames
Jamie Clarke (WAL) | 1
George Pragnell (ENG) | 4
Oliver Sykes (ENG) | 3
Peter Lines (ENG) | 4
Ashley Hugill (ENG) | 4
Alfie Davies (WAL) | 1
Mark Lloyd (ENG) | 3
Peter Devlin (ENG) | 4

Semi-finals; Best of 7 frames
(England) George Pragnell | 3
(England) Peter Lines | 4
(England) Ashley Hugill | 0
(England) Peter Devlin | 4

Final; Best of 7 frames
(England) Peter Lines | 4
(England) Peter Devlin | 3

=== Event 3 ===
The third Q Tour Europe event took place at the Grand Blue Fafa Resort in Golem, Kavajë, Albania from 9 to 12 October 2025. Simon Blackwell beat Mark Joyce 4–3 in the final. The final-day results are given below.

Quarter-finals; Best of 7 frames
Ryan Thomerson (AUS) | 3
Simon Blackwell (ENG) | 4
Oliver Sykes (ENG) | 4
Stuart Carrington (ENG) | 2
Mark Joyce (ENG) | 4
George Pragnell (ENG) | 0
Jamie Clarke (WAL) | 1
Hammad Miah (ENG) | 4

Semi-finals; Best of 7 frames
(England) Simon Blackwell | 4
(England) Oliver Sykes | 0
(England) Mark Joyce | 4
(England) Hammad Miah | 2

Final; Best of 7 frames
(England) Simon Blackwell | 4
(England) Mark Joyce | 3

=== Event 4 ===
The fourth Q Tour Europe event took place at the Northern Snooker Centre in Leeds from 29 October to 1 November 2025. Jamie Clarke beat Craig Steadman 4–2 in the final. The final-day results are given below.

Quarter-finals; Best of 7 frames
Peter Lines (ENG) | 3
Jamie Clarke (WAL) | 4
Stuart Carrington (ENG) | 4
Riley Powell (WAL) | 1
Craig Steadman (ENG) | 4
Oliver Briffett-Payne (WAL) | 2
Jake Crofts (ENG) | 0
Hammad Miah (ENG) | 4

Semi-finals; Best of 7 frames
(Wales) Jamie Clarke | 4
(England) Stuart Carrington | 1
(England) Craig Steadman | 4
(England) Hammad Miah | 2

Final; Best of 7 frames
(Wales) Jamie Clarke | 4
(England) Craig Steadman | 2

=== Event 5 ===
The fifth Q Tour Europe event took place at the Bulgarian Snooker Academy in Sofia, Bulgaria from 5 to 7 December 2025. Jamie Clarke beat Stuart Carrington 4–2 in the final to win his second Q Tour event of the season. The final-day results are given below.

Quarter-finals; Best of 7 frames
Peter Lines (ENG) | 1
Stuart Carrington (ENG) | 4
Oliver Sykes (ENG) | 4
Simon Blackwell (ENG) | 0
Jamie Clarke (WAL) | 4
Alfie Davies (WAL) | 0
Mark Joyce (ENG) | 3
Alfie Burden (ENG) | 4

Semi-finals; Best of 7 frames
(England) Stuart Carrington | 4
(England) Oliver Sykes | 2
(Wales) Jamie Clarke | 4
(England) Alfie Burden | 3

Final; Best of 7 frames
(England) Stuart Carrington | 2
(Wales) Jamie Clarke | 4

=== Event 6 ===
The sixth Q Tour Europe event took place at the Delta Moon Snooker Club in Mons, Belgium from 13 to 15 February 2026. Ashley Carty defeated Craig Steadman 4–1 in the final. The final-day results are given below.

Quarter-finals; Best of 7 frames
Ashley Carty (ENG) | 4
George Pragnell (ENG) | 1
Oliver Sykes (ENG) | 4
Alex Millington (ENG) | 1
Ashley Hugill (ENG) | 4
Andrew Higginson (ENG) | 0
Craig Steadman (ENG) | 4
Zachary Richardson (ENG) | 1

Semi-finals; Best of 7 frames
(England) Ashley Carty | 4
(England) Oliver Sykes | 2
(England) Ashley Hugill | 2
(England) Craig Steadman | 4

Final; Best of 7 frames
(England) Ashley Carty | 4
(England) Craig Steadman | 1

=== Event 7 ===
The seventh Q Tour Europe event was held at the Landywood Snooker Club in Great Wyrley from 26 February to 1 March 2026. Jamie Clarke gained a place on the main tour after his last-16 win over Sybren Sokolowski, which guaranteed that he would finish top of the Q Tour Europe rankings. Ashley Hugill defeated Alfie Davies 4–2 in the final. The final-day results are given below.

Quarter-finals; Best of 7 frames
Jamie Clarke (WAL) | 1
Nattanapong Chaikul (THA) | 4
Luke Pinches (ENG) | 0
Ashley Hugill (ENG) | 4
Alfie Davies (WAL) | 4
Barry Pinches (ENG) | 1
Sean Maddocks (ENG) | 1
Antony Parsons (ENG) | 4

Semi-finals; Best of 7 frames
(Thailand) Nattanapong Chaikul | 2
(England) Ashley Hugill | 4
(Wales) Alfie Davies | 4
(England) Antony Parsons | 1

Final; Best of 7 frames
(England) Ashley Hugill | 4
(Wales) Alfie Davies | 2

== Q Tour Global ==
The Q Tour Global consisted of regional Q Tour series held outside Europe.

=== Americas series ===
The schedule for the Q Tour Americas events is given below.

| Date | | Country | Tournament | Venue | City | Field | Winner | Runner-up | Score | Ref. |
|---|---|---|---|---|---|---|---|---|---|---|
| 19 Jun | 22 Jun | BRA | Event 1 | Iate Club | Rio de Janeiro | 40 | Igor Figueiredo (BRA) | Claudio Menechini (BRA) | 5–1 | |
| 30 Oct | 2 Nov | BRA | Event 2 | H Niterói Hotel | Rio de Janeiro | 40 | Igor Figueiredo (BRA) | Claudio Menechini (BRA) | 5–0 | |
| 10 Jan | 12 Jan | CAN | Event 3 | The Corner Bank | Toronto | 12 | Alan Whitfield (CAN) | Jason Williams (CAN) | 4–1 | |
| 13 Feb | 16 Feb | USA | Event 4 | California Snooker Academy | San Jose | 24 | Adam Nijiati (USA) | Hasanain Khalid Alsultani (USA) | 5–4 | |

=== Asia Pacific series ===
The schedule for the Q Tour Asia Pacific events is given below.

| Date | | Country | Tournament | Venue | City | Field | Winner | Runner-up | Score | Ref. |
|---|---|---|---|---|---|---|---|---|---|---|
| 27 Jun | 29 Jun | AUS | Event 1 (Note: Event also known as the West Coast International.) | Pot Black Snooker Centre | Perth | 41 | Vinnie Calabrese (AUS) | Salman Asif (AUS) | 5–0 | |
| 11 Jul | 13 Jul | NZL | Event 2 (Note: Event also known as the New Zealand Open.) | Cuthberts Green | Christchurch | 56 | Cody Turner (NZL) | Mark Canovan (NZL) | 5–1 | |
| 1 Aug | 3 Aug | AUS | Event 3 (Note: Event also known as the Fred Osbourne Classic.) | Commercial Club Albury | Albury | 82 | Steve Mifsud (AUS) | Hassan Kerde (AUS) | 4–0 | |
| 9 Oct | 12 Oct | AUS | Event 4 (Note: Event also known as the Bob Hawke AC Australian Open.) | Mounties Club | Sydney | 96 | Vinnie Calabrese (AUS) | Hassan Kerde (AUS) | 6–4 | |
| 23 Jan | 26 Jan | AUS | Event 5 | Redcliffe Snooker Club | Brisbane | 55 | Vinnie Calabrese (AUS) | Daniell Haenga (NZL) | 5–1 | |

=== Middle East series ===
The schedule for the Q Tour Middle East events is given below.

| Date | | Country | Tournament | Venue | City | Field | Winner | Runner-up | Score | Ref. |
|---|---|---|---|---|---|---|---|---|---|---|
| 21 Sep | 24 Sep | UAE | Event 1 | EBSF Cue Sports Academy | Dubai | 60 | Mostafa Dorgham (EGY) | Ali Jaleel (IRQ) | 4–2 | |
| 25 Sep | 28 Sep | UAE | Event 2 | EBSF Cue Sports Academy | Dubai | 59 | Ali Gharahgozlou (IRN) | Ali Jaleel (IRQ) | 4–2 | |
| 20 Jan | 23 Jan | UAE | Event 3 | EBSF Cue Sports Academy | Dubai | 64 | Siyavosh Mozayani (IRN) | Ali Alobaidli (QAT) | 4–2 | |
| 24 Jan | 27 Jan | UAE | Event 4 | EBSF Cue Sports Academy | Dubai | 55 | Ali Ali (IRQ) | Emad Adnan (IRQ) | 4–1 | |

== Q Tour Playoff ==
The final event, the WPBSA Q Tour Playoff, was held in Gandía, Spain, from 15 to 17 March, following the EBSA Spring Championships. There were just three entries from Q Tour Global: Alan Whitfield and Hasanain Khalid Alsultani from the American series and Ismail Türker from the Middle East series. That meant that the Q Tour Europe qualification was extended to the leading 21 eligible players in the rankings. Ashley Carty, Ashley Hugill and Craig Steadman won their respective play-offs and thereby secured a return to the World Snooker Tour starting with the 2026–27 season.

=== Playoff 1 ===
Quarter-finals; Best of 9 frames
Peter Lines (ENG) | 5
Oliver Briffett-Payne (WAL) | 1
Barry Pinches (ENG) | 5
Ryan Thomerson (AUS) | 1
Simon Blackwell (ENG) | 2
Peter Devlin (ENG) | 5
Hayden Staniland (ENG) | 3
Ashley Carty (ENG) | 5

Semi-finals; Best of 11 frames
(England) Peter Lines | 6
(England) Barry Pinches | 5
(England) Peter Devlin | 5
(England) Ashley Carty | 6

Final; Best of 19 frames
(England) Peter Lines | 8
(England) Ashley Carty | 10

=== Playoff 2 ===
Quarter-finals; Best of 9 frames
Daniel Womersley (ENG) | 5
Andrew Higginson (ENG) | 4
Ismail Türker (TUR) | 3
Mark Joyce (ENG) | 5
Alfie Davies (WAL) | 5
Sean O'Sullivan (ENG) | 3
Luke Pinches (ENG) | 1
Ashley Hugill (ENG) | 5

Semi-finals; Best of 11 frames
(England) Daniel Womersley | 2
(England) Mark Joyce | 6
(Wales) Alfie Davies | 3
(England) Ashley Hugill | 6

Final; Best of 19 frames
(England) Mark Joyce | 5
(England) Ashley Hugill | 10

=== Playoff 3 ===
Quarter-finals; Best of 9 frames
Craig Steadman (ENG) | 5
Callum Beresford (ENG) | 0
Alan Whitfield (CAN) | 0
Patrick Whelan (ENG) | 5
George Pragnell (ENG) | 5
Hasanain Khalid Alsultani (USA) | 0
Alex Millington (ENG) | 3
Stuart Carrington (ENG) | 5

Semi-finals; Best of 11 frames
(England) Craig Steadman | 6
(England) Patrick Whelan | 5
(England) George Pragnell | 5
(England) Stuart Carrington | 6

Final; Best of 19 frames
(England) Craig Steadman | 10
(England) Stuart Carrington | 7

== See also ==
- 2025 Q School
