= 2016 EBSA European Snooker Championship =

EBSA European Snooker Championships
Tournament information
- Dates: 12–21 February 2016
- Venue: Haston City Centre
- City: Wrocław
- Country: Poland
- Winner's share: €3,300
- Highest break: (Republic of Ireland) Michael Judge (133)

Final
- Champion: (Wales) Jak Jones
- Runner-up: (Wales) Jamie Clarke
- Score: 7–4

The 2016 EBSA European Snooker Championships was an amateur snooker tournament that took place from 12 February to 21 February 2016 in Wrocław, Poland. It was the 25th edition of the EBSA European Snooker Championships and also doubles as a qualification event for the World Snooker Tour.

The tournament was won by 34th seed Jak Jones who defeated fellow countryman Jamie Clarke 7–4 in the final. This was Clarke's second consecutive loss in the European Championships final. As a result, Jones was given a two-year card on the professional World Snooker Tour for the 2016/2017 and 2017/2018 seasons.

== Results ==
=== Round 1 ===
Best of 7 frames

65	(Germany) Sascha Breuer	4–1	64	(Poland) Paweł Koch
33	(Austria) Dominik Scherübl	4–2	96	(Poland) Ariel Trębocha
81	(Latvia) Maris Volajs	2–4	48	(Scotland) Lee Mein
49	(Israel) Shachar Ruberg	4–2	80	(Poland) Karol Lelek
73	(Austria) Paul Schopf	3–4	56	(Iceland) Sigurdur Kristjansson
41	(Israel) Roey Fernandez	3–4	88	(France) Brian Ochoiski
89	(Czech Republic) Ales Herout	4–3	40	(Malta) Aaron Busuttil
57	(Israel) David Vaitzman	4–0	72	(Russia) Ivan Kakovsky
69	(Malta) Simon Zammit	4–3	60	(Northern Ireland) Dermot McGlinchey
37	(Isle of Man) John Kennish	4–0	92	(Scotland) Barry Wraith
85	(Norway) Erik Dullerud	0–4	44	(Sweden) Simon Lindblom
53	(Scotland) Chris Totten	4–0	76	(Italy) Gianmarco Tonini
77	(Israel) Maor Shalom	1–4	52	(Czech Republic) Lukas Krenek
45	(Germany) Robin Otto	1–4	84	(France) Niel Vincent
93	(Bosnia and Herzegovina) Kenan Terzić	4–1	36	(Austria) Andreas Ploner
61	(Poland) Paweł Rogoza	1–4	68	(Sweden) Belan Sharif

67	(Northern Ireland) Conor McCormack	1–4	62	(Sweden) Suleman Salam
35	(Belgium) Laurens De Staelen	4–2	94	(Croatia) Tin Venos
83	(Sweden) Arpat Pulat	4–2	46	(Czech Republic) Shay Arama
51	(Cyprus) Antonis Poullos	4–3	78	(Denmark) Danny Eriksen
75	(Austria) Hans Nirnberger	1–4	54	(Malta) Philip Ciantar
43	(Czech Republic) Daniel Mily	4–0	86	(Albania) Eklent Kaçi
91	(Netherlands) Maurice Le Duc	3–4	38	(Malta) Chris Peplow
59	(Finland) Mika Hummelin	4–1	70	(Switzerland) Tom Zimmermann
71	(Poland) Jarosław Kowalski	4–3	71	(Lithuania) Simonas Dragunas
39	(Germany) Felix Frede	4–1	90	(Portugal) Pedro France
87	(Lithuania) Vilius Schulte	2–4	42	(Poland) Mateusz Baranowski
55	(Denmark) Rune Kampe	4–0	74	(Latvia) Rodion Judin
79	(Poland) Patryk Masłowski	4–2	50	(Hungary) Zsolt Fenyvesi
47	(Wales) Jack Bradford	4–2	82	(Serbia) Sasa Stojanovic
95	(France) David Gauthier	0–4	34	(Wales) Jak Jones
63	(Poland) Marek Zubrzycki	3–4	66	(Poland) Maciej Kusak

=== Round 2 ===
Best of 7 frames

1	(Wales) Jamie Carke	4–0	65	(Germany) Sascha Breuer
33	(Austria) Dominik Scherübl	2–4	32	(Poland) Marcin Nitschke
17	(Republic of Ireland) Jason Devaney	4–0	48	(Scotland) Lee Mein
49	(Israel) Shachar Ruberg	1–4	16	(Malta) Alex Borg
9	(Poland) Adam Stefanów	4–0	56	(Iceland) Sigurdur Kristjansson
88	(France) Brian Ochoiski	0–4	24	(Poland) Krzysztof Wróbel
25	(Netherlands) Reind Duut	1–4	89	(Czech Republic) Ales Herout
57	(Israel) David Vaitzman	3–4	8	(Wales) David John
5	(England) Michael Rhodes	4–2	69	(Malta) Simon Zammit
37	(Isle of Man) John Kennish	1–4	28	(England) Callum Downing
21	(Belgium) Tomasz Skalski	4–1	44	(Sweden) Simon Lindblom
53	(Scotland) Chris Totten	4–3	12	(Belgium) Kevin Van Hove
13	(Iceland) Kristján Helgason	4–3	52	(Czech Republic) Lukas Krenek
84	(France) Niel Vincent	1–4	20	(Wales) Rhydian Richards
29	(Wales) Alex Taubman	1–4	36	(Austria) Andreas Ploner
61	(Poland) Paweł Rogoza	1–4	4	(Republic of Ireland) Michael Judge

3	(England) Billy Joe Castle	4–1	62	(Sweden) Suleman Salam
35	(Belgium) Laurens De Staelen	0–4	30	(Estonia) Andres Petrov
19	(Scotland) Robert Carlisle	4–3	83	(Sweden) Arpat Pulat
51	(Cyprus) Antonis Poullos	4–3	14	(Germany) Patrick Einsle
11	(England) Darryn Walker	4–0	54	(Malta) Philip Ciantar
43	(Czech Republic) Daniel Mily	2–4	22	(Belgium) Jeff Jacobs
27	(Belgium) Jurian Heusdens	3–4	38	(Malta) Chris Peplow
59	(Finland) Mika Hummelin	2–4	6	(Scotland) Michael Collumb
7	(Republic of Ireland) Ryan Cronin	4–1	71	(Poland) Jarosław Kowalski
39	(Germany) Felix Frede	2–4	26	(Switzerland) Alexander Ursenbacher
23	(England) Adam Edge	1–4	42	(Poland) Mateusz Baranowski
55	(Denmark) Rune Kampe	3–4	10	(Poland) Kacper Filipiak
15	(Republic of Ireland) Josh Boileau	4–0	79	(Poland) Patryk Masłowski
47	(Wales) Jack Bradford	1–4	18	(Republic of Ireland) Brendan O'Donoghue
31	(Germany) Lukas Kleckers	2–4	34	(Wales) Jak Jones
66	(Poland) Maciej Kusak	0–4	2	(Malta) Brian Cini

Round 2 Best of 7 frames
1	(Wales) Jamie Clarke	4
32	(Poland) Marcin Nitschke	1
17	(Republic of Ireland) Jason Devaney	3
16	(Malta) Alex Borg	4
9	(Poland) Adam Stefanów	4
24	(Poland) Krzysztof Wróbel	1
89	(Czech Republic) Ales Herout	3
8	(Wales) David John	4
5	(England) Michael Rhodes	4
28	(England) Callum Downing	1
21	(Belgium) Tomasz Skalski	4
53	(Scotland) Chris Totten	1
13	(Iceland) Kristján Helgason	2
20	(Wales) Rhydian Richards	4
36	(Austria) Andreas Ploner	1
4	(Republic of Ireland) Michael Judge	4
3	(England) Billy Joe Castle	0
30	(Estonia) Andres Petrov	4
19	(Scotland) Robert Carlisle	4
51	(Cyprus) Antonis Poullos	0
11	(England) Darryn Walker	0
22	(Belgium) Jeff Jacobs	4
36	(Malta) Chris Peplow	1
6	(Scotland) Michael Collumb	4
7	(Republic of Ireland) Ryan Cronin	0
26	(Switzerland) Alexander Ursenbacher	4
42	(Poland) Mateusz Baranowski	3
10	(Poland) Kacper Filipiak	4
15	(Republic of Ireland) Josh Boileau	1
18	(Republic of Ireland) Brendan O'Donoghue	4
34	(Wales) Jak Jones	4
2	(Malta) Brian Cini	0

Round 3 Best of 9 frames
1	(Wales) Jamie Clarke	5
16	(Malta) Alex Borg	3
9	(Poland) Adam Stefanów	5
8	(Wales) David John	3
5	(England) Michael Rhodes	3
21	(Belgium) Tomasz Skalski	5
20	(Wales) Rhydian Richards	5
4	(Republic of Ireland) Michael Judge	4
30	(Estonia) Andres Petrov	5
19	(Scotland) Robert Carlisle	2
22	(Belgium) Jeff Jacobs	3
6	(Scotland) Michael Collumb	5
26	(Switzerland) Alexander Ursenbacher	2
10	(Poland) Kacper Filipiak	5
18	(Republic of Ireland) Brendan O'Donoghue	3
34	(Wales) Jak Jones	5

Quarter-Finals; Best of 9 frames
1	(Wales) Jamie Clarke	5
9	(Poland) Adam Stefanów	4
21	(Belgium) Tomasz Skalski	2
20	(Wales) Rhydian Richards	5
30	(Estonia) Andres Petrov	5
6	(Scotland) Michael Collumb	1
10	(Poland) Kacper Filipiak	4
34	(Wales) Jak Jones	5

Semi-Finals; Best of 11 frames
1	(Wales) Jamie Clarke	6
20	(Wales) Rhydian Richards	5
30	(Estonia) Andres Petrov	4
34	(Wales) Jak Jones	6

Final; Best of 13 frames
1	(Wales) Jamie Clarke	4
34	(Wales) Jak Jones	7
