= 2020 Championship League (June 2020) =

Snooker tournament, held June 2020

2020 Championship League (June)
Tournament information
- Dates: 1–11 June 2020
- Venue: Marshall Arena
- City: Milton Keynes
- Country: England
- Organisation: Matchroom Sport
- Format: Non-ranking event
- Total prize fund: £218,000
- Winner's share: £30,000
- Highest break: Joe O'Connor (ENG) (143)

Final
- Champion: Luca Brecel (BEL)
- Runner-up: Ben Woollaston (ENG)
- Score: Round-robin

The 2020 Championship League (also known as the 2020 Matchroom.com Championship League) was a professional non-ranking snooker tournament that took place from 1 to 11 June 2020 at the Marshall Arena in Milton Keynes, England. It was the 14th edition of the Championship League. The event featured 64 players from the World Snooker Tour competing in three rounds of round-robin groups of four players. The initial group stage matches were played between 1 and 8 June, the group winners' stage on 9 and 10 June, and the finals stage on 11 June. It was one of the first live sporting events to be held in the United Kingdom since the start of the coronavirus lockdown in March 2020.

Luca Brecel won the tournament, finishing top of the final group ahead of Ben Woollaston, Stuart Bingham and Ryan Day. The event was broadcast on ITV4 in the United Kingdom, Eurosport across Europe, Superstars Online, Youku and Zhibo.tv in China, Fox Sports in Australia and Sky in New Zealand. Elsewhere, the event was broadcast on Matchroom Sport.

== Tournament format ==
The 2020 Championship League was held between 1 and 11 June 2020 at the Marshall Arena in Milton Keynes, England. The tournament took place without an audience whilst maintaining social distancing. Originally due to take place in Leicester, the event was moved to Milton Keynes because of the on-site facilities at the venue, meaning that the players and officials did not need to leave the location for the duration of their involvement once they had arrived. All players were tested for COVID-19 prior to taking part. The event was sponsored by Matchroom Sport and broadcast live domestically on ITV4. It was also broadcast by Eurosport across Europe, Superstars Online, Youku and Zhibo.tv in China, Fox Sports in Australia and Sky in New Zealand.

There were 64 snooker professionals taking part in the event. The competition began with 16 rounds of group matches, each group consisting of four players. Two groups were played to a finish every day from 1 to 8 June, using a two-table setup in the arena. The groups were contested using a round-robin format, with six matches played in each group. All matches were played as the best of four frames, with three points awarded for a win and one point for a draw. Group positions were determined by points scored, frame difference and then head-to-head results between players who were tied. Places that were still tied were then determined by the highest break made in the group.

The 16 players that topped the group tables qualified for the group winners' stage, consisting of four groups of four players. Two of the four groups played to a finish on 9 June and the other two groups on 10 June, again using two tables. The four winners from the group winners' stage qualified for the tournament finals played on 11 June using a single table. The winner of this final group took the Championship League title and a place at the 2020 Champion of Champions.

=== Prize fund ===
The breakdown of prize money for the tournament is shown below.

Group stage

- Winner: £4,000
- Runner-up: £2,000
- Third place: £1,500
- Fourth place: £1,000

Group winners' stage

- Winner: £6,000
- Runner-up: £2,500
- Third place: £2,000
- Fourth place: £1,500

Final group

- Winner: £20,000
- Runner-up: £8,000
- Third place: £4,000
- Fourth place: £2,000

- Tournament total: £218,000

== Tournament summary ==
=== Group stages ===
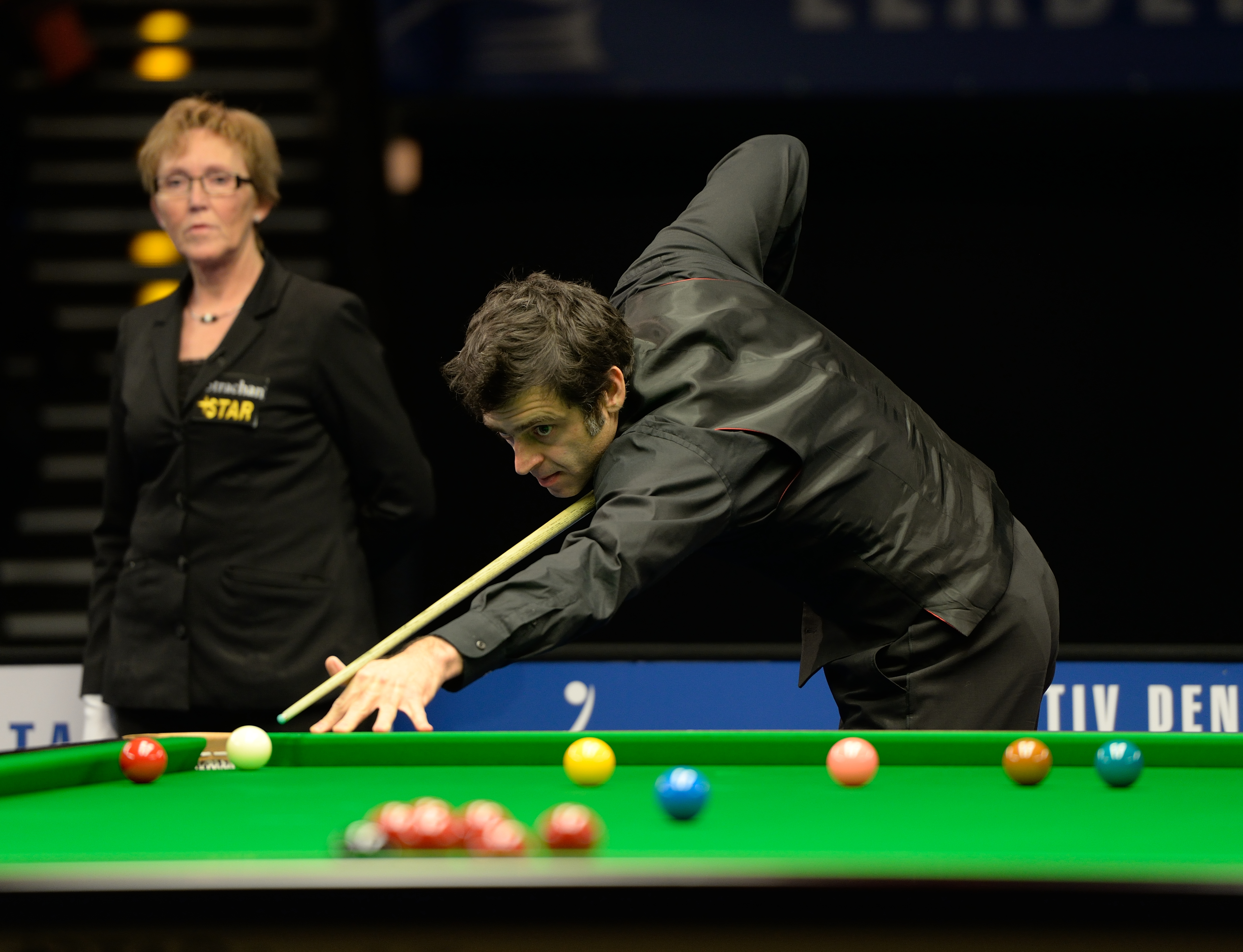
Ronnie O'Sullivan won all three of his group games 3–0.

The first round of group games was played from 1 to 8 June. Reigning world champion Judd Trump won all three group games to qualify from group 2, losing a frame to both Elliot Slessor and Daniel Wells. David Gilbert drew his second match against Jak Jones, but won against Stuart Carrington 3–0 to progress, with Carrington scoring only five points. Belgian player Luca Brecel and Englishman Jack Lisowski both defeated Oliver Lines and drew against Robbie Williams. Brecel made a break of 138 during his win over Lines and took a 2–1 lead over Lisowski. He required a break higher than 138, but was unable, tying the match at 2–2, with Brecel progressing. In group 3, Mark Joyce won all three matches leading Mark Davis. Ryan Day and Kyren Wilson met in the final match of group 12, with the victor winning the group. Day won the first two frames, before Wilson won frame 3. With the higher break, a 111, Wilson could progress with a 2–2 draw, however Day made a break of 86 to win.

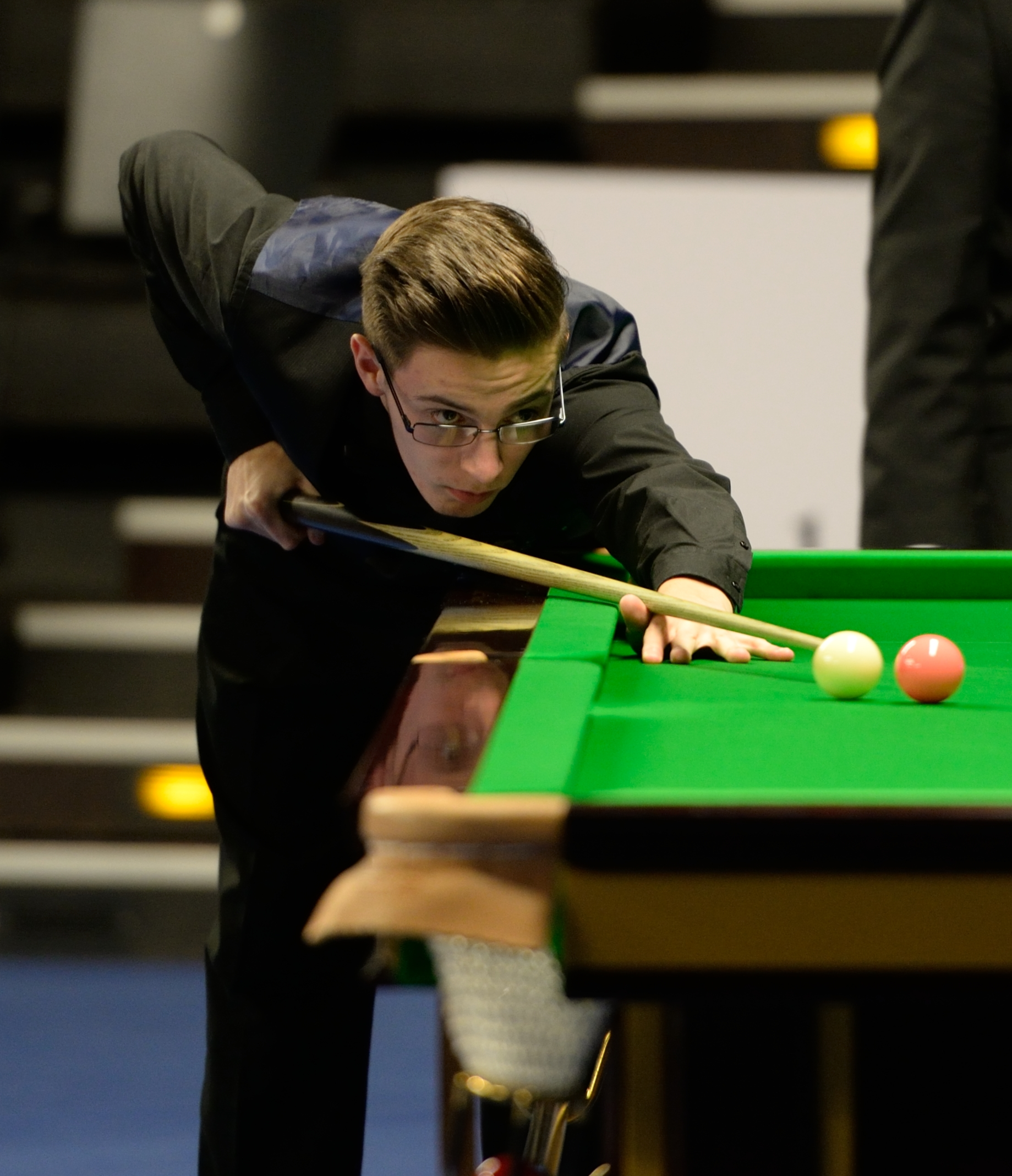
World number 83, Ashley Carty, won group 16 over 2010 World Snooker Championship winner Neil Robertson.

In group 4, Harvey Chandler drew his first match against Joe Perry, but won his other two matches to lead the group. Liang Wenbo won group 5 with three wins whilst Joe O'Connor finished second, who made the highest break of his career, and of the event a 143 in his draw with Mark Selby. Gary Wilson won group 14, scoring four century breaks in ten frames. Both Ronnie O'Sullivan and Tom Ford won groups on 5 June, with O'Sullivan not losing a single frame. Stuart Bingham and Ricky Walden both finished group 1 with a win and two draws. The final match of the group was between Jamie Clarke and Jordan Brown. Jordan requiring a 3–0 win to progress, but the match was won by Clarke. Bingham won the group with a break of 94, but Walden made a 89 break, but played a harder shot on the black ball, attempting to make a maximum break. Ben Woollaston won group 8, but spent the tournament estranged from his wife Tatiana Woollaston, who had been refereeing the event due to the social distancing rules.

Barry Hawkins won group 7, ahead of Anthony McGill with two wins and a draw. Former world champion Neil Robertson lost his opening match to Ashley Carty, who won the group. Martin O'Donnell and Mark Allen both won two matches, before they met in the final match of the round. The match finished 2–2, with O'Donnell winning the group with a better frame difference. Group 6 was won by Sam Craigie, who finished above Masters finalist Ali Carter.

=== Winners' and final groups ===
The 16 group winners were split into four groups, labelled A through D and played on 9 and 10 June. Three players finished on six points in group C. Ronnie O'Sullivan won a fourth straight match without losing a frame, before winning 3–1 against Sam Craigie, who defeated Stuart Bingham in his first match, and defeated Harvey Chandler in the final match. The match between O'Sullivan and Bingham would decide the winner of the group, but Bingham won 3–0 to lead the other players on frame difference.

Martin O'Donnell defeated Sam Woollaston 3–1, before Woollaston won his next two matches 3–0, with three century breaks over Tom Ford to win the group on frame difference. Luca Brecel won group A after defeating Ashley Carty, and drawing his other two games 2–2. When leading Mark Joyce 2–0, Brecel missed hitting a red ball on three occasions forcing him to forfeit the frame. Ryan Day defeated reigning world champion Judd Trump in the opening match of group B, which he went on to win with two other draws. In the final match, against Barry Hawkins, Day needed to win one frame to go through to the final group, and won frame one with a break of 62.

The final group was played on 11 June. The opening match was between Brecel and Bingham, with Brecel winning all three frames. Woollaston then defeated Ryan Day 3–1, before Day drew his remaining two matches to finish the group fourth on two points. Stuart Bingham defeated Woollaston 3–1 finishing third with four points. The final match was between Brecel and Woollaston. Woolaston could win the tournament with a win, or Brecel would win the championship. Brecel won the first frame, with a break of 67, but Woollaston won the second frame after a fluke on the pink ball. In the third frame, Woollaston took a 2–1 lead, with a century break of 126, so whoever won the final frame would win the event. In the deciding frame, Brecel made a break of 111 to draw the match, and win the tournament, ahead of Woollaston, who finished as runner-up.

== Group stage ==
The group stage consisted of 16 groups, each containing four players. Two groups played to a finish each day from 1 to 8 June.

=== Order of play ===
Date	Group
1 June	Group 2
1 June	Group 13
2 June	Group 3
2 June	Group 9
3 June	Group 4
3 June	Group 12
4 June	Group 5
4 June	Group 14

Date	Group
5 June	Group 10
5 June	Group 15
6 June	Group 1
6 June	Group 8
7 June	Group 7
7 June	Group 16
8 June	Group 6
8 June	Group 11

=== Group 1 ===
Group 1 was played on 6 June.

==== Matches ====
- Stuart Bingham 3–0 Jamie Clarke
- Ricky Walden 2–2 Jordan Brown
- Ricky Walden 3–0 Jamie Clarke
- Stuart Bingham 2–2 Jordan Brown
- Stuart Bingham 2–2 Ricky Walden
- Jordan Brown 0–3 Jamie Clarke

==== Table ====
Pos.	Player	P	W	D	L	FW	FL	FD	HB	Pts
1	Stuart Bingham (ENG)	3	1	2	0	7	4	+3	94	5
2	Ricky Walden (ENG)	3	1	2	0	7	4	+3	89	5
3	Jamie Clarke (WAL)	3	1	0	2	3	6	−3	105	3
4	Jordan Brown (NIR)	3	0	2	1	4	7	−3	74	2

=== Group 2 ===
Group 2 was played on 1 June.

==== Matches ====
- Judd Trump 3–0 David Grace
- Daniel Wells 1–3 Elliot Slessor
- Daniel Wells 2–2 David Grace
- Judd Trump 3–1 Elliot Slessor
- Elliot Slessor 3–1 David Grace
- Judd Trump 3–1 Daniel Wells

==== Table ====
Pos.	Player	P	W	D	L	FW	FL	FD	HB	Pts
1	Judd Trump (ENG)	3	3	0	0	9	2	+7	63	9
2	Elliot Slessor (ENG)	3	2	0	1	7	5	+2	106	6
3	Daniel Wells (WAL)	3	0	1	2	4	8	−4	85	1
4	David Grace (ENG)	3	0	1	2	3	8	−5	39	1

=== Group 3 ===
Group 3 was played on 2 June.

==== Matches ====
- Mark Davis 1–3 Mark Joyce
- Michael Holt 3–1 Louis Heathcote
- Michael Holt 1–3 Mark Joyce
- Mark Davis 2–2 Louis Heathcote
- Michael Holt 1–3 Mark Davis
- Mark Joyce 3–1 Louis Heathcote

==== Table ====
Pos.	Player	P	W	D	L	FW	FL	FD	HB	Pts
1	Mark Joyce (ENG)	3	3	0	0	9	3	+6	101	9
2	Mark Davis (ENG)	3	1	1	1	6	6	0	66	4
3	Michael Holt (ENG)	3	1	0	2	5	7	−2	65	3
4	Louis Heathcote (ENG)	3	0	1	2	4	8	−4	121	1

=== Group 4 ===
Group 4 was played on 3 June.

==== Matches ====
- Mark King 1–3 Sam Baird
- Joe Perry 2–2 Harvey Chandler
- Joe Perry 2–2 Sam Baird
- Mark King 1–3 Harvey Chandler
- Joe Perry 2–2 Mark King
- Sam Baird 1–3 Harvey Chandler

==== Table ====
Pos.	Player	P	W	D	L	FW	FL	FD	HB	Pts
1	Harvey Chandler (ENG)	3	2	1	0	8	4	+4	101	7
2	Sam Baird (ENG)	3	1	1	1	6	6	0	96	4
3	Joe Perry (ENG)	3	0	3	0	6	6	0	74	3
4	Mark King (ENG)	3	0	1	2	4	8	−4	85	1

=== Group 5 ===
Group 5 was played on 4 June.

==== Matches ====
- Mark Selby 3–1 Lee Walker
- Liang Wenbo 3–1 Joe O'Connor
- Liang Wenbo 3–0 Lee Walker
- Mark Selby 2–2 Joe O'Connor
- Joe O'Connor 3–1 Lee Walker
- Mark Selby 0–3 Liang Wenbo

==== Table ====
Pos.	Player	P	W	D	L	FW	FL	FD	HB	Pts
1	Liang Wenbo (CHN)	3	3	0	0	9	1	+8	117	9
2	Joe O'Connor (ENG)	3	1	1	1	6	6	0	143	4
3	Mark Selby (ENG)	3	1	1	1	5	6	−1	89	4
4	Lee Walker (WAL)	3	0	0	3	2	9	−7	66	0

=== Group 6 ===
Group 6 was played on 8 June.

==== Matches ====
- Matthew Selt 0–3 Sam Craigie
- Ali Carter 1–3 Dominic Dale
- Ali Carter 2–2 Sam Craigie
- Matthew Selt 2–2 Dominic Dale
- Ali Carter 3–1 Matthew Selt
- Sam Craigie 3–0 Dominic Dale

==== Table ====
Pos.	Player	P	W	D	L	FW	FL	FD	HB	Pts
1	Sam Craigie (ENG)	3	2	1	0	8	2	+6	131	7
2	Ali Carter (ENG)	3	1	1	1	6	6	0	114	4
3	Dominic Dale (WAL)	3	1	1	1	5	6	−1	67	4
4	Matthew Selt (ENG)	3	0	1	2	3	8	−5	137	1

=== Group 7 ===
Group 7 was played on 7 June.

==== Matches ====
- Anthony McGill 2–2 Craig Steadman
- Barry Hawkins 3–0 Hammad Miah
- Barry Hawkins 3–0 Craig Steadman
- Anthony McGill 3–1 Hammad Miah
- Barry Hawkins 2–2 Anthony McGill
- Craig Steadman 0–3 Hammad Miah

==== Table ====
Pos.	Player	P	W	D	L	FW	FL	FD	HB	Pts
1	Barry Hawkins (ENG)	3	2	1	0	8	2	+6	96	7
2	Anthony McGill (SCO)	3	1	2	0	7	5	+2	107	5
3	Hammad Miah (ENG)	3	1	0	2	4	6	−2	75	3
4	Craig Steadman (ENG)	3	0	1	2	2	8	−6	53	1

=== Group 8 ===
Group 8 was played on 6 June.

==== Matches ====
- Ben Woollaston 3–0 Liam Highfield
- Jimmy Robertson 3–0 Thor Chuan Leong
- Jimmy Robertson 2–2 Liam Highfield
- Ben Woollaston 3–0 Thor Chuan Leong
- Liam Highfield 3–0 Thor Chuan Leong
- Jimmy Robertson 2–2 Ben Woollaston

==== Table ====
Pos.	Player	P	W	D	L	FW	FL	FD	HB	Pts
1	Ben Woollaston (ENG)	3	2	1	0	8	2	+6	71	7
2	Jimmy Robertson (ENG)	3	1	2	0	7	4	+3	81	5
3	Liam Highfield (ENG)	3	1	1	1	5	5	0	95	4
4	Thor Chuan Leong (MAS)	3	0	0	3	0	9	−9	65	0

=== Group 9 ===
Group 9 was played on 2 June.

==== Matches ====
- Jack Lisowski 3–0 Oliver Lines
- Luca Brecel 2–2 Robbie Williams
- Luca Brecel 3–0 Oliver Lines
- Jack Lisowski 2–2 Robbie Williams
- Robbie Williams 0–3 Oliver Lines
- Jack Lisowski 2–2 Luca Brecel

==== Table ====
Pos.	Player	P	W	D	L	FW	FL	FD	HB	Pts
1	Luca Brecel (BEL)	3	1	2	0	7	4	+3	138	5
2	Jack Lisowski (ENG)	3	1	2	0	7	4	+3	104	5
3	Oliver Lines (ENG)	3	1	0	2	3	6	−3	136	3
4	Robbie Williams (ENG)	3	0	2	1	4	7	−3	84	2

=== Group 10 ===
Group 10 was played on 5 June.

==== Matches ====
- Ronnie O'Sullivan 3–0 Kishan Hirani
- Chris Wakelin 3–0 Michael Georgiou
- Chris Wakelin 2–2 Kishan Hirani
- Ronnie O'Sullivan 3–0 Michael Georgiou
- Ronnie O'Sullivan 3–0 Chris Wakelin
- Michael Georgiou 1–3 Kishan Hirani

==== Table ====
Pos.	Player	P	W	D	L	FW	FL	FD	HB	Pts
1	Ronnie O'Sullivan (ENG)	3	3	0	0	9	0	+9	116	9
2	Chris Wakelin (ENG)	3	1	1	1	5	5	0	119	4
3	Kishan Hirani (WAL)	3	1	1	1	5	6	−1	35	4
4	Michael Georgiou (CYP)	3	0	0	3	1	9	−8	39	0

=== Group 11 ===
Group 11 was played on 8 June.

==== Matches ====
- Mark Allen 3–1 Nigel Bond
- Martin O'Donnell 3–0 Michael White
- Martin O'Donnell 3–1 Nigel Bond
- Mark Allen 3–1 Michael White
- Michael White 3–0 Nigel Bond
- Mark Allen 2–2 Martin O'Donnell

==== Table ====
Pos.	Player	P	W	D	L	FW	FL	FD	HB	Pts
1	Martin O'Donnell (ENG)	3	2	1	0	8	3	+5	62	7
2	Mark Allen (NIR)	3	2	1	0	8	4	+4	85	7
3	Michael White (WAL)	3	1	0	2	4	6	−2	60	3
4	Nigel Bond (ENG)	3	0	0	3	2	9	−7	61	0

=== Group 12 ===
Group 12 was played on 3 June.

==== Matches ====
- Kyren Wilson 2–2 Chen Feilong
- Ryan Day 3–0 Alfie Burden
- Ryan Day 2–2 Chen Feilong
- Kyren Wilson 3–0 Alfie Burden
- Alfie Burden 3–0 Chen Feilong
- Kyren Wilson 1–3 Ryan Day

==== Table ====
Pos.	Player	P	W	D	L	FW	FL	FD	HB	Pts
1	Ryan Day (WAL)	3	2	1	0	8	3	+5	91	7
2	Kyren Wilson (ENG)	3	1	1	1	6	5	+1	111	4
3	Alfie Burden (ENG)	3	1	0	2	3	6	−3	88	3
4	Chen Feilong (CHN)	3	0	2	1	4	7	−3	102	2

=== Group 13 ===
Group 13 was played on 1 June.

==== Matches ====
- Stuart Carrington 3–1 Jak Jones
- David Gilbert 3–0 Jackson Page
- David Gilbert 2–2 Jak Jones
- Stuart Carrington 2–2 Jackson Page
- David Gilbert 3–0 Stuart Carrington
- Jak Jones 0–3 Jackson Page

==== Table ====
Pos.	Player	P	W	D	L	FW	FL	FD	HB	Pts
1	David Gilbert (ENG)	3	2	1	0	8	2	+6	100	7
2	Jackson Page (WAL)	3	1	1	1	5	5	0	45	4
3	Stuart Carrington (ENG)	3	1	1	1	5	6	−1	69	4
4	Jak Jones (WAL)	3	0	1	2	3	8	−5	83	1

=== Group 14 ===
Group 14 was played on 4 June.

==== Matches ====
- Gerard Greene 3–1 John Astley
- Gary Wilson 3–0 Mitchell Mann
- Gary Wilson 3–1 John Astley
- Gerard Greene 2–2 Mitchell Mann
- Gary Wilson 3–0 Gerard Greene
- John Astley 2–2 Mitchell Mann

==== Table ====
Pos.	Player	P	W	D	L	FW	FL	FD	HB	Pts
1	Gary Wilson (ENG)	3	3	0	0	9	1	+8	134	9
2	Gerard Greene (NIR)	3	1	1	1	5	6	−1	85	4
3	Mitchell Mann (ENG)	3	0	2	1	4	7	−3	90	2
4	John Astley (ENG)	3	0	1	2	4	8	−4	75	1

=== Group 15 ===
Group 15 was played on 5 June.

==== Matches ====
- Robert Milkins 3–0 Mike Dunn
- Tom Ford 3–0 Ian Burns
- Tom Ford 3–0 Mike Dunn
- Robert Milkins 2–2 Ian Burns
- Tom Ford 3–1 Robert Milkins
- Mike Dunn 1–3 Ian Burns

==== Table ====
Pos.	Player	P	W	D	L	FW	FL	FD	HB	Pts
1	Tom Ford (ENG)	3	3	0	0	9	1	+8	130	9
2	Robert Milkins (ENG)	3	1	1	1	6	5	+1	51	4
3	Ian Burns (ENG)	3	1	1	1	5	6	−1	68	4
4	Mike Dunn (ENG)	3	0	0	3	1	9	−8	34	0

=== Group 16 ===
Group 16 was played on 7 June.

==== Matches ====
- Neil Robertson 1–3 Ashley Carty
- Kurt Maflin 1–3 Ken Doherty
- Kurt Maflin 2–2 Ashley Carty
- Neil Robertson 2–2 Ken Doherty
- Neil Robertson 3–1 Kurt Maflin
- Ken Doherty 1–3 Ashley Carty

==== Table ====
Pos.	Player	P	W	D	L	FW	FL	FD	HB	Pts
1	Ashley Carty (ENG)	3	2	1	0	8	4	+4	87	7
2	Neil Robertson (AUS)	3	1	1	1	6	6	0	119	4
3	Ken Doherty (IRL)	3	1	1	1	6	6	0	90	4
4	Kurt Maflin (NOR)	3	0	1	2	4	8	−4	24	1

== Group winners' stage ==
The group winners' stage consisted of four groups, each containing four players. Groups C and D played to a finish on 9 June. Groups A and B played to a finish on 10 June.

=== Group A ===
==== Matches ====
- Luca Brecel 2–2 Mark Joyce
- Gary Wilson 1–3 Ashley Carty
- Gary Wilson 3–0 Mark Joyce
- Luca Brecel 3–1 Ashley Carty
- Gary Wilson 2–2 Luca Brecel
- Mark Joyce 3–1 Ashley Carty

==== Table ====
Pos.	Player	P	W	D	L	FW	FL	FD	HB	Pts
1	Luca Brecel (BEL)	3	1	2	0	7	5	+2	109	5
2	Gary Wilson (ENG)	3	1	1	1	6	5	+1	132	4
3	Mark Joyce (ENG)	3	1	1	1	5	6	−1	60	4
4	Ashley Carty (ENG)	3	1	0	2	5	7	−2	97	3

=== Group B ===
==== Matches ====
- Judd Trump 0–3 Ryan Day
- David Gilbert 2–2 Barry Hawkins
- David Gilbert 2–2 Ryan Day
- Judd Trump 3–1 Barry Hawkins
- Judd Trump 2–2 David Gilbert
- Barry Hawkins 2–2 Ryan Day

==== Table ====
Pos.	Player	P	W	D	L	FW	FL	FD	HB	Pts
1	Ryan Day (WAL)	3	1	2	0	7	4	+3	122	5
2	Judd Trump (ENG)	3	1	1	1	5	6	−1	60	4
3	David Gilbert (ENG)	3	0	3	0	6	6	0	120	3
4	Barry Hawkins (ENG)	3	0	2	1	5	7	−2	130	2

=== Group C ===
==== Matches ====
- Ronnie O'Sullivan 3–0 Harvey Chandler
- Stuart Bingham 1–3 Sam Craigie
- Stuart Bingham 3–0 Harvey Chandler
- Ronnie O'Sullivan 3–1 Sam Craigie
- Ronnie O'Sullivan 0–3 Stuart Bingham
- Sam Craigie 3–0 Harvey Chandler

==== Table ====
Pos.	Player	P	W	D	L	FW	FL	FD	HB	Pts
1	Stuart Bingham (ENG)	3	2	0	1	7	3	+4	75	6
2	Sam Craigie (ENG)	3	2	0	1	7	4	+3	97	6
3	Ronnie O'Sullivan (ENG)	3	2	0	1	6	4	+2	104	6
4	Harvey Chandler (ENG)	3	0	0	3	0	9	−9	42	0

=== Group D ===
==== Matches ====
- Tom Ford 2–2 Liang Wenbo
- Martin O'Donnell 3–1 Ben Woollaston
- Martin O'Donnell 3–1 Liang Wenbo
- Tom Ford 0–3 Ben Woollaston
- Tom Ford 3–1 Martin O'Donnell
- Liang Wenbo 0–3 Ben Woollaston

==== Table ====
Pos.	Player	P	W	D	L	FW	FL	FD	HB	Pts
1	Ben Woollaston (ENG)	3	2	0	1	7	3	+4	134	6
2	Martin O'Donnell (ENG)	3	2	0	1	7	5	+2	128	6
3	Tom Ford (ENG)	3	1	1	1	5	6	−1	95	4
4	Liang Wenbo (CHN)	3	0	1	2	3	8	−5	75	1

== Final group ==
The tournament finals, consisting of one final group of four players, were played on 11 June. Luca Brecel won the event after finishing top of the final group, with Ben Woollaston the runner-up.

=== Matches ===
- Stuart Bingham 0–3 Luca Brecel
- Ryan Day 1–3 Ben Woollaston
- Ryan Day 2–2 Luca Brecel
- Stuart Bingham 3–1 Ben Woollaston
- Stuart Bingham 2–2 Ryan Day
- Luca Brecel 2–2 Ben Woollaston

=== Table ===
Pos.	Player	P	W	D	L	FW	FL	FD	HB	Pts
1	Luca Brecel (BEL)	3	1	2	0	7	4	+3	111	5
2	Ben Woollaston (ENG)	3	1	1	1	6	6	0	141	4
3	Stuart Bingham (ENG)	3	1	1	1	5	6	−1	74	4
4	Ryan Day (WAL)	3	0	2	1	5	7	−2	105	2

Key: P = Matches played; W = Matches won; D = Matches drawn; L = Matches lost; FW = Frames won; FL = Frames lost; FD = Frame difference; HB = Highest break

== Century breaks ==
In total, there were 53 century breaks made during the event. The highest was a 143 made by Joe O'Connor in group 5. Scores in bold denote the highest break in the indicated group.

- **143** (5) – Joe O'Connor
- **141** (FG), **134** (D), 127, 126, 101 – Ben Woollaston
- **138** (9), 111, 109, 106, 105 – Luca Brecel
- **137** (6) – Matthew Selt
- 136 – Oliver Lines
- **134** (14), **132** (A), 125, 107, 100 – Gary Wilson
- 131, 123 – Sam Craigie
- **130** (B), 114 – Barry Hawkins
- **130** (15) – Tom Ford
- 128 – Martin O'Donnell
- 122, 107, 105, 103 – Ryan Day
- **121** (3) – Louis Heathcote
- 120, 117, **100** (13) – David Gilbert
- **119** (10) – Chris Wakelin
- **119** (16), 107, 106 – Neil Robertson
- 117, 103, 100 – Liang Wenbo
- 116, 112, **104** (C), 101 – Ronnie O'Sullivan
- 114 – Ali Carter
- **111** (12) – Kyren Wilson
- **107** (7), 106 – Anthony McGill
- **106** (2) – Elliot Slessor
- **105** (1) – Jamie Clarke
- 104 – Jack Lisowski
- 102 – Chen Feilong
- **101** (4) – Harvey Chandler
- 101 – Mark Joyce
