= Michael Larkov =

Ukrainian snooker player

Personal information
- Full name: Mykhailo Mykhailovych Larkov
- Born: 5 January 2009 (age 17) Shepetivka

Sport
- Country: Ukraine
- Sport: Snooker
- Highest ranking: 109 (July 2026)
- Current ranking: 125 (as of 7 November 2026)

Mykhailo Mykhailovych Larkov (Note: In this name that follows East Slavic naming customs, the patronymic is Mykhailovych and the family name is Larkov.; Ukrainian: Михайло Михайлович Ларков, pronounced [mɪˈxɑjlo mɪˈxɑjlɔvɪtʃ ˈlɑrkɔv].; Various transliterations of Larkov's given name have been used by different sources. The transliteration Mykhailo follows the official transliteration table as suggested by a Ukrainian Cabinet of Ministers resolution in 2010. The WST, the WPBSA and snooker.org all currently use the English/German variant Michael.) (born 5 January 2009), better known as Michael Larkov, is a Ukrainian professional snooker player. In January 2026, he won the WSF World Junior Championship, and with it earned a two-year card on the World Snooker Tour starting with the 2026–27 snooker season.

== Biography ==
Larkov was born in Shepetivka, Khmelnytskyi Oblast, Ukraine. In 2021, aged 12, he became the youngest winner of the Ukrainian pyramid billiards Championship. In 2022 Larkov won the bronze medal at the World Open Under-16 Snooker Championships. Larkov moved to Germany with his family after the 2022 Russian invasion of Ukraine, and went to school in Dortmund. He continued to play snooker and won the 2023-24 German Snooker Tour, as a 15 year-old.

Larkov was a semi-finalist at the 2024 DMT Best of Europe Snooker Championship, losing to Belgian professional Ben Mertens. That year, Larkov defeated Kyrylo Baidala in the final of the 2024 Ukrainian National Snooker Championship in Lviv. As a 16 year-old, Larkov hit the top break in the tournament (140) and reached the semi-finals at the 2025–26 Q Tour Event 1, losing to eventual winner Hammad Miah in Stockholm, Sweden.

In January 2026, he won the WSF Junior Snooker Championship, in Bulgaria, winning 4-0 against Thailand’s Prin Ratmukda in the semi-final before beating Wang Xinbo of China 5-2 in the final, the win earned him a two-year World Snooker Tour (WST) tour card, starting from the 2026-27 snooker season. The following week, he advanced to the knockout stages of the WSF Championship in Sofia. He lost 10-5 to Ross Muir in the first round of qualifying for the 2026 World Snooker Championship.

Larkov played his debut event as a professional in the qualifying rounds for the 2026 China Open in June 2026, losing in the first round to Hammad Miah. That month, he had his first match win as a professional with a defeat of Antoni Kowalski of Poland in the first qualifying round of the 2026 Wuhan Open.

== Performance and rankings timeline ==
Tournament	2025/ 26	2026/ 27
Ranking (Note: It shows the ranking at the beginning of the season)	(Note: He was an amateur)	(Note: New players don't have a ranking)
Ranking tournaments
Championship League	A	RR
China Open	NH	LQ
Wuhan Open	A	LQ
British Open	A	LQ
English Open	A	LQ
Shenzhen Open (Note: The event was called the Xi'an Grand Prix (2025/2026))	A	LQ
Northern Ireland Open	A	LQ
International Championship	A	LQ
UK Championship	A	LQ
Shoot Out	A	
Scottish Open	A	
German Masters	A	LQ
Welsh Open	A	
World Grand Prix	DNQ	
Players Championship	DNQ	
World Open	A	
Tour Championship	DNQ	
World Championship	LQ	

Performance Table Legend
LQ	lost in the qualifying draw	#R	lost in the early rounds of the tournament (WR = Wildcard round, RR = Round robin)	QF	lost in the quarter-finals
SF	lost in the semi-finals	F	lost in the final	W	won the tournament
DNQ	did not qualify for the tournament	A	did not participate in the tournament	WD	withdrew from the tournament
DQ	disqualified from the tournament				

NH / Not Held	event was not held
NR / Non-Ranking Event	event is/was no longer a ranking event
R / Ranking Event	event is/was a ranking event
MR / Minor-Ranking Event	means an event is/was a minor-ranking event
PA / Pro-am Event	means an event is/was a pro-am event

== Career finals ==
=== Amateur finals: 17 (10 titles) ===
Outcome	No.	Year	Championship	Opponent in the final	Score
Runner-up	1.	2022	German Snooker Tour - Event 20 (2022–2023)	(Turkey) Enes Bakirci	0–2
Winner	1.	2022	German Snooker Tour - Event 24 (2022–2023)	(Germany) Christian Richter	3–2
Winner	2.	2022	German Snooker Tour - Event 54 (2022–2023)	(Germany) Christian Richter	2–0
Winner	3.	2023	German Snooker Tour - Event 85 (2022–2023)	(Ukraine) Heorhii Petrunko	2–1
Winner	4.	2023	German Snooker Tour - Event 34 (2023–2024)	(Ukraine) Matvei Lagodzinschii	1–0
Winner	5.	2023	German Snooker Tour - Event 37 (2023–2024)	(Ukraine) Matvei Lagodzinschii	2–0
Runner-up	2.	2023	German Snooker Tour - Event 39 (2023–2024)	(Germany) Richard Wienold	1–2
Runner-up	3.	2023	German Snooker Tour - Event 65 (2023–2024)	(Syria) Omar Alkojah	1–2
Runner-up	4.	2023	German Snooker Tour - Event 72 (2023–2024)	(Ukraine) Heorhii Petrunko	1–3
Runner-up	5.	2024	German Grand Prix - Event 3 (2023–2024)	(Germany) Alexander Widau	0–3
Runner-up	6.	2024	German Grand Prix - Event 4 (2023–2024)	(Germany) Alexander Widau	0–3
Runner-up	7.	2024	German Snooker Tour - Event 122 (2023–2024)	(Germany) Lukas Kleckers	0–2
Winner	6.	2024	German Snooker Tour - Final (2023–2024)	(Germany) Lukas Kleckers	1–0
Winner	7.	2024	German Snooker Tour - Event 40 (2024–2025)	(Turkey) Ismail Türker	2–0
Winner	8.	2024	Ukrainian Amateur Championship	(Ukraine) Kyryl Baidala	5–1
Winner	9.	2025	German Grand Prix - Event 5 (2024–2025)	(Germany) Fabian Haken	3–0
Winner	10.	2026	WSF Junior Championship	(China) Wang Xinbo	5–2

=== Team finals: 1 (1 title) ===
Outcome	No.	Year	Championship	Team/Partner	Opponent(s) in the final	Score	Ref.
Winner	1.	2025	EBSA European Team Snooker Championship	Ukraine; Anton Kazakov	Malta 3 Philip Ciantar; Isaac Borg	3–1	
