= Jamie Clarke (snooker player) =

Welsh snooker player (born 1994)

Personal information
- Born: 5 October 1994 (age 32) Llanelli, Carmarthenshire

Sport
- Country: Wales
- Sport: Snooker
- Professional: 2018–2025, 2026–present
- Highest ranking: 43 (November 2022)
- Current ranking: 93 (as of 7 November 2026)
- Best ranking finish: Semi-final (2019 Shoot Out)

Jamie Clarke (born 5 October 1994) is a Welsh professional snooker player.

== Career ==
Clarke drew attention in 2014 when he defeated former world number 8 Darren Morgan in 6–0 whitewash in the semi-finals of the Welsh Amateur Championship before going on to defeat Lee Walker to capture the highest ranking and most prestigious amateur event in Wales. In 2015 Clarke entered several events in an attempt to qualify for the World Snooker Tour and narrowly missed out by losing in the final of tournaments on 3 occasions. In April, Clarke lost 3–4 in a final-frame decider to Martin O'Donnell in the final round of the EBSA Qualifying Tour Play-off. Clarke would go on to enter Q School in May 2015, but would be unable to advance further than the third round. In June 2015, Clarke qualified for the knockout stage of EBSA European Snooker Championship as the 19th seed where he lost 4–7 to Michael Wild in the final.

The following month at the IBSF World Under-21 Snooker Championship Clarke once again reached the tournament final before losing 7–8 in the deciding frame to Boonyarit Keattikun. In February 2016, Clarke once again reached the final of the EBSA European Snooker Championship as the number 1 seed, however he was once again defeated 4–7 losing to fellow countryman Jak Jones. Two months later Clarke again lost a final-frame decider 3–4 to Elliot Slessor in the final round of the EBSA Qualifying Tour Play-off. This was Clarke's fifth defeat in the final round of a tournament to qualify for the World Snooker Tour. Clarke was finally able to gain professional status at the sixth attempt, in the EBSA Tour Qualifying Play-offs, thanks to victories over former World Championship semi-finalist Andy Hicks and English amateur George Pragnall.

He qualified for the first time for the 2020 World Snooker Championship, defeating Mark Allen 10–8 in the first round despite Allen scoring 5 centuries. Clarke was involved in a controversial incident during his second round match against Anthony McGill. Clarke was leading 7–2 when McGill complained to him directly that he had stood in his eyeline on several occasions during the match while he was getting down on a shot. Referee Jan Verhaas intervened but it seemed to unsettle Clarke after he won the frame. During the interval he tweeted 'You want to dance, let's dance.' McGill won the remaining five frames of the session to trail 7–8. Ultimately the match went to a decider; Clarke was in first during the deciding frame before failing to escape from a snooker, and leaving a free ball. This was enough for McGill to win the match and see Clarke lose 12–13.

Clarke's campaign at the 2021 World Snooker Championship ended in a similar fashion. In the last qualifying round, he led Mark Davis 7-2 after the first session before Davis won seven frames on a spin in the second session, with Clarke eventually losing 8–10.

== Performance and rankings timeline ==
Tournament	2013/ 14	2014/ 15	2015/ 16	2016/ 17	2017/ 18	2018/ 19	2019/ 20	2020/ 21	2021/ 22	2022/ 23	2023/ 24	2024/ 25	2025/ 26	2026/ 27
Ranking (Note: It shows the ranking at the beginning of the season)	(Note: He was an amateur)					(Note: New players on the Main Tour don't have a ranking)	84	(Note: Players who qualified via a World Championship Wildcard start without ranking points)	67	49	56	59		
Ranking tournaments
Championship League	Non-Ranking Event							2R	RR	2R	RR	RR	A	RR
China Open	A	LQ	A	A	A	1R	Tournament Not Held							LQ
Wuhan Open	Tournament Not Held										1R	2R	A	LQ
British Open	Tournament Not Held								1R	1R	LQ	1R	A	1R
English Open	Not Held			A	A	1R	1R	3R	3R	LQ	LQ	1R	A	2R
Shenzhen Open (Note: The event was called the Xi'an Grand Prix (2024/2025–2025/2026))	Tournament Not Held											1R	A	LQ
Northern Ireland Open	Not Held			A	1R	1R	1R	1R	LQ	1R	1R	1R	A	LQ
International Championship	A	A	A	A	A	LQ	LQ	Not Held			LQ	1R	A	LQ
UK Championship	A	A	A	A	A	1R	1R	2R	1R	2R	2R	LQ	LQ	LQ
Shoot Out	Non-Ranking			A	A	SF	4R	1R	QF	1R	2R	1R	A	
Scottish Open	Not Held			A	A	1R	1R	2R	LQ	2R	1R	LQ	A	
German Masters	A	LQ	A	A	LQ	LQ	1R	LQ	LQ	LQ	2R	LQ	A	
Welsh Open	A	1R	A	A	A	1R	1R	1R	1R	LQ	1R	2R	A	
World Grand Prix	NH	NR	DNQ	DNQ	DNQ	DNQ	DNQ	DNQ	DNQ	DNQ	DNQ	DNQ	DNQ	
Players Championship	DNQ	DNQ	DNQ	DNQ	DNQ	DNQ	DNQ	DNQ	DNQ	DNQ	DNQ	DNQ	DNQ	
World Open	A	Not Held		A	A	LQ	LQ	Not Held			LQ	LQ	A	
Tour Championship	Tournament Not Held					DNQ	DNQ	DNQ	DNQ	DNQ	DNQ	DNQ	DNQ	
World Championship	A	LQ	LQ	A	A	LQ	2R	LQ	1R	LQ	LQ	LQ	LQ	
Non-ranking tournaments
Championship League	A	A	A	A	A	A	RR	A	A	A	A	A	A	
Former ranking tournaments
Wuxi Classic	A	LQ	Tournament Not Held											
Australian Goldfields Open	LQ	A	A	Tournament Not Held										
Shanghai Masters	A	LQ	A	A	A	Non-Ranking		Not Held			Non-Ranking Event			
Paul Hunter Classic	Minor-Ranking			LQ	1R	1R	NR	Tournament Not Held						
Indian Open	A	LQ	NH	A	LQ	LQ	Tournament Not Held							
Riga Masters (Note: The event was called the Riga Open (2014/2015–2015/2016))	NH	Minor-Ranking		A	LQ	LQ	LQ	Tournament Not Held						
China Championship	Not Held			NR	A	LQ	LQ	Tournament Not Held						
WST Pro Series	Tournament Not Held							RR	Tournament Not Held					
Turkish Masters	Tournament Not Held								LQ	Tournament Not Held				
Gibraltar Open	Not Held		MR	1R	3R	3R	2R	4R	1R	Tournament Not Held				
WST Classic	Tournament Not Held									3R	Tournament Not Held			
European Masters	Not Held			A	1R	LQ	LQ	3R	1R	LQ	LQ	Not Held		
Saudi Arabia Masters	Tournament Not Held											2R	A	NH
Former non-ranking tournaments
Six-red World Championship	A	3R	2R	A	A	A	A	Not Held		LQ	Tournament Not Held			
Haining Open	NH	Minor-Ranking		2R	A	A	A	NH	A	A	Tournament Not Held			

Performance Table Legend
LQ	lost in the qualifying draw	#R	lost in the early rounds of the tournament (WR = Wildcard round, RR = Round robin)	QF	lost in the quarter-finals
SF	lost in the semi-finals	F	lost in the final	W	won the tournament
DNQ	did not qualify for the tournament	A	did not participate in the tournament	WD	withdrew from the tournament

NH / Not Held	means an event was not held.
NR / Non-Ranking Event	means an event is/was no longer a ranking event.
R / Ranking Event	means an event is/was a ranking event.
MR / Minor-Ranking Event	means an event is/was a minor-ranking event.

== Career finals ==
=== Amateur finals: 8 (4 titles) ===
Outcome	No.	Year	Championship	Opponent in the final	Score
Winner	1.	2010	Junior Pot Black	(Wales) Tom Rees	1–0
Runner-up	1	2010	Pontins Star of the Future	(Scotland) Anthony McGill	1–4
Winner	2.	2014	Welsh Amateur Championship	(Wales) Lee Walker	8–6
Runner-up	2.	2015	European Snooker Championship	(England) Michael Wild	4–7
Runner-up	3.	2015	World Under-21 Snooker Championship	(Thailand) Boonyarit Keattikun	7–8
Runner-up	4.	2016	European Snooker Championship	(Wales) Jak Jones	4–7
Winner	3.	2025	Q Tour - Event 4	(England) Craig Steadman	4–2
Winner	4.	2025	Q Tour - Event 5	(England) Stuart Carrington	4–2

=== Team finals: 1 ===
Outcome	No.	Year	Championship	Team/partner	Opponent in the final	Score
Runner-up	1.	2014	World Mixed Doubles Championship	(Belgium) Wendy Jans	(England) Ben Woollaston (Belarus) Yana Shut	0–3
