= Jak Jones =

Welsh snooker player (born 1993)

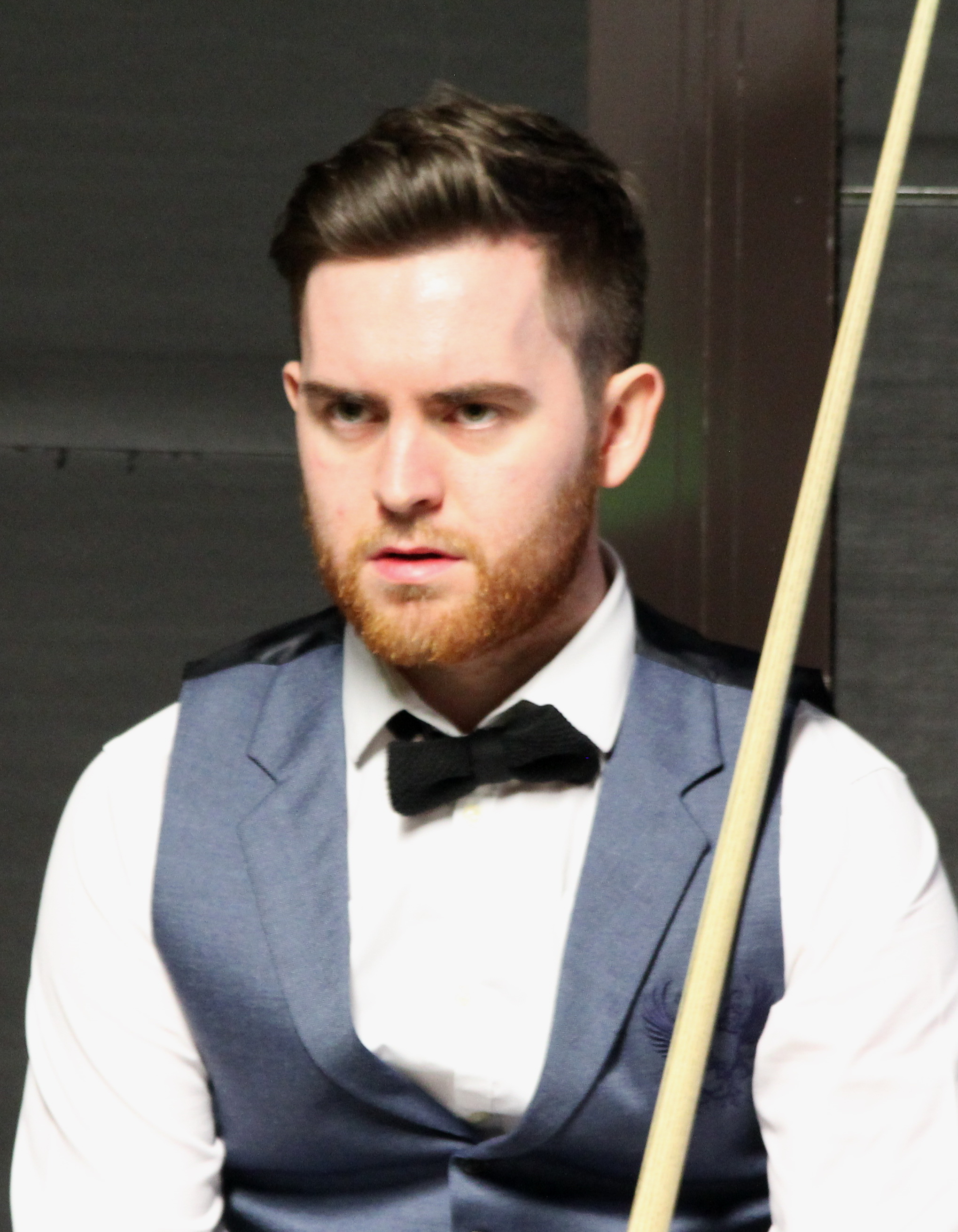
- Jones at the 2016 Paul Hunter Classic

Personal information
- Nickname: The Silent Assassin
- Born: 29 July 1993 (age 33) Cwmbran, Torfaen, Wales

Sport
- Country: Wales
- Sport: Snooker
- Professional: 2010/2011, 2013–2015, 2016–present
- Highest ranking: 14 (May 2024)
- Current ranking: 17 (as of 7 November 2026)
- Maximum breaks: 1
- Century breaks: 187 (as of 18 November 2026)

Tournament wins
- Ranking: 2

Jak Jones (born 29 July 1993) is a Welsh professional snooker player from Cwmbran, Torfaen, in South Wales. He became a professional in 2010 at the age of 16 after winning the 2010 European Under-19 Snooker Championship in Malta. He was professional for a single season, and again from 2013 to 2015 before returning to the tour in 2016.

In 2024, ranked 44th in the world, he reached the final of the 2024 World Snooker Championship, his first ranking event final. He lost the final to Kyren Wilson 14‍–‍18. In 2026, Jones defeated David Gilbert in the final of the 2026 Championship League to win his first ranking title.

== Career ==
=== Early years ===
Jones's talent was first spotted by chance, on a holiday in Corfu, by Darren Morgan – a 1994 Snooker World Championship semi-finalist – who was on his honeymoon there.

Jones first turned professional in 2010 after winning the European Under-19 Snooker Championships, defeating Anthony McGill 6–4 in the final. In his first year on the tour, Jones only won one match in his attempts to qualify for the seven ranking events. He played in all 12 of the minor-ranking Players Tour Championship (PTC) events throughout the year, with his best results being two last 32 defeats, and was placed 85th on the PTC Order of Merit. He ended his debut season ranked world number 94, meaning he was relegated from the tour as he did not finish inside the top 64.

Having dropped off the tour, Jones could only enter PTC events for the next couple of seasons; he played in 10 of the 12. At the second event, he beat Anthony Hamilton 4–3, James Wattana 4–2 and Sam Craigie 4–1 to reach the last 16, where he was edged out 3–4 by Rory McLeod. Two other last 32 defeats saw Jones finish 75th on the PTC Order of Merit.

Jones played in seven out of twelve PTC events during the 2012–13 season. He won a total of three matches and was ranked 106th on the Order of Merit. He earned a place in the EBSA Qualifying Tour Play-offs by finishing number 2 in the rankings and winning the Scottish Amateur Open. He beat Elliot Slessor 4–2 and John Parkin 4–0 to claim a place back on the snooker tour for the 2013–14 season.

=== 2013–2016 ===
Jones lost all 16 matches he played in the 2013–14 season, meaning that he finished with a world ranking of 128.

In the 2014–15 season, he qualified for the Australian Goldfields Open by edging past Joe O'Connor 5–4: it was his first win on the main tour in 18 months. He was beaten 1–5 by Nigel Bond in the subsequent round. In the second round of the Riga Open he recorded the biggest win of his career by knocking out world number one Neil Robertson 4–3, before losing by a reverse of this scoreline to Sean O'Sullivan. He later finished 67th on the Order of Merit. He did not win more than one match at any other event during the rest of the season until the World Championship, when he defeated Aditya Mehta 10–7 and Jack Lisowski 10–5. This meant that Jones was just one victory away from qualifying for the biggest event on the snooker calendar. He recovered from 0–4 down against Ryan Day to level at 6–6. However, he then lost four frames in a row to be beaten 6–10. He fell off the tour at the end of the season as he was the world number 95, outside the top 64 who retain their places.

After falling off the professional tour, Jones did not play in a single professional event during the 2015–16 season, but by beating Jamie Clarke 7–4 in the final of the 2016 EBSA European Championship he earned a two-year main tour card.

=== 2016–2020 ===
Jones beat Jamie Cope 4–3 at the Riga Masters, before being thrashed 0–4 by Mark Williams. He defeated Brandon Sargeant 4–0 and Elliot Slessor 4–3 at the English Open, then recorded a shock 4–2 win over Ding Junhui, a player ranked 105 places above him, despite having a high break of 34. Jones was 3–1 up on Anthony Hamilton in the fourth round, but lost 3–4. At the International Championship, he saw off Jimmy Robertson 6–4 and was then defeated 2–6 by John Higgins in the second round. He reached the fourth round at the Shoot-Out, before being defeated by Shaun Murphy. At the end of the season, he reached his new highest world ranking of 77.

Despite his new ranking, Jones was unable to progress beyond the second round of any ranking event over the course of the 2017–18 season, He dropped off the tour but entered the 2018 Q School in an attempt to win back a place, and secured his return to the tour at the first event.

The highlights of his 2018–19 season were reaching the last 32 of the UK Championship where he lost 2–6 to Sunny Akani, and the Welsh Open where he lost 1–4 to Joe O'Connor. By the end of the season he had marginally improved his best season-end ranking to 75.

His best results in the 2019–20 season came early on, where he reached the last 32 of the Riga Masters (losing 4–2 to Matthew Selt) and the International Championship (losing 3–6 to Gary Wilson). He finished the season just outside the top 64 in 67th, but finished in second place (behind Jordan Brown) on the one-year ranking list for players ranked outside the top 64, thus receiving a new tour card.

=== 2020–2022 ===
During the 2020–21 season which was largely played behind closed doors due to the COVID-19 pandemic, Jones progressed to the quarter-finals of a ranking event for first time. At the 2020 English Open, he recorded victories over Elliot Slessor (4–1), Jack Lisowski (4–3), Ben Hancorn (4–2), and compatriot Matthew Stevens (4–3) before losing 1–5 to John Higgins in the quarter-finals. Although he was unable to match this result over the remainder of the season, he finished with a career-high ranking of 65.

In 2021–22, he continued to consistently qualify for events, and had a relatively strong finish to the season. At the first round of the Turkish Masters, he defeated Mark Allen 5–4 in a final-frame decider. He then defeated Hossein Vafaei 5–4 in the last 32, before losing to former world champion Shaun Murphy 3–5 in the last 16. At the next ranking event, the Gibraltar Open, he received a walkover against Vafaei, before defeating both Robbie Williams and Luca Brecel 4–3 in final-frame deciders. He then recorded impressive victories over former world champions Neil Robertson (4–1) and Stuart Bingham (4–0) to progress to his maiden ranking semi-final where he was defeated 4–2 by eventual tournament winner Robert Milkins.

=== 2022–23 season ===
With a new high ranking of 41, he had a relatively quiet first half of the season, not progressing beyond the last 64 of a ranking event. In the second half of the season, he recorded back-to-back last 16 finishes at the Shoot Out and the Welsh Open, where he was defeated by Chris Wakelin and Pang Junxu respectively. At the 2023 World Snooker Championship, he entered the second round of qualifying where was drawn against Adam Duffy, winning 10–6. He then defeated Robbie Williams in the next round 10–9 in a final-frame decider, before being drawn against 2013 world finalist Barry Hawkins in the final round of qualifying. Jones defeated Hawkins 10–8 to progress to the final stage of the World Championship and the Crucible Theatre for the first time. Drawn against two-time world finalist Ali Carter in the first round, he recorded an impressive 10–6 victory to progress to the last 16 where he faced 2010 world champion Neil Robertson, one of the pre-tournament favourites. Jones led virtually throughout the match (the only point at which he trailed was at 5–4) and produced a shock 13–7 win to progress to the quarter-finals. Faced with Mark Allen in the quarter-finals, who Jones called the "player of the season" in the match build-up, Jones built a 4–2 lead, but despite a plucky performance and a match that lasted over eight hours, he was defeated 10–13.

=== 2023–24 season ===
Jones started the 2023–24 season with three victories from three in the Championship League ranking event to top his group in the first stage; he did not progress from his group in the second stage. He once again had a quiet first half of the season, with his best performance being a last 32 finish at the International Championship, where he lost 4–6 to Ronnie O'Sullivan. After a last 16 finish at his home tournament, the Welsh Open (where he lost 0–4 to Dominic Dale), he entered qualifying for the World Snooker Championship. He had victories over compatriot Jamie Clarke (10–6) and Zhou Yuelong (10–4) to progress to the Crucible as a qualifier for the second consecutive season. He was drawn against world number 11 Zhang Anda in the last 32, whom he defeated 10–4. He then defeated 2023 semi-finalist Si Jiahui 13–9 in the last 16 to reach the quarter-finals for the second successive season. Facing Judd Trump – one of the pre-tournament favourites – in the quarter-finals, Jones completed a 13–9 victory to progress to the semi-finals of the World Championship for the first time. He overcame Stuart Bingham 17–12 in the semi-finals to reach the World Championship final where he lost 14–18 to Kyren Wilson.

Two of Jones's losing opponents, Trump and Bingham, criticised his playing style, complaining about his tactical approach. Jones responded that the comments were an excuse.

=== 2024–present ===
Jones exited the 2025 World Championship in the first round, losing 4–10 to eventual champion Zhao Xintong.

Jones won his first ranking title after 16 years on the professional circuit at the 2026 Championship League, defeating David Gilbert in the final in July. He went on to win another ranking title two months later at the 2026 British Open, where he defeated Mark Selby 10–6.

Jones reached the final of the 2026 Northern Ireland Open, but was defeated 2–9 by Kyren Wilson.

Jones's walk-on music is "Dakota" by Stereophonics.

== Performance and rankings timeline ==
| Tournament | 2010/ 11 | 2011/ 12 | 2012/ 13 | 2013/ 14 | 2014/ 15 | 2016/ 17 | 2017/ 18 | 2018/ 19 | 2019/ 20 | 2020/ 21 | 2021/ 22 | 2022/ 23 | 2023/ 24 | 2024/ 25 | 2025/ 26 | 2026/ 27 |
|---|---|---|---|---|---|---|---|---|---|---|---|---|---|---|---|---|
| Ranking (Note: It shows the ranking at the beginning of the season) | (Note: New players on the Main Tour don't have a ranking) | (Note: He was an amateur) | | | 128 | | 77 | (Note: Players qualified through Q School started the season without ranking points) | 75 | (Note: Players qualified One Year Ranking List started the season without ranking points) | 65 | 41 | 35 | 14 | 21 | 32 |
Ranking tournaments
| Championship League | Tournament Not Held | | | | | | | | | RR | RR | RR | 2R | 2R | RR | W |
| China Open | LQ | A | A | LQ | LQ | LQ | 2R | LQ | Tournament Not Held | | | | | | | LQ |
| Wuhan Open | Tournament Not Held | | | | | | | | | | | | 1R | 2R | 2R | 1R |
| British Open | Tournament Not Held | | | | | | | | | | 3R | 2R | LQ | QF | 2R | W |
| English Open | Tournament Not Held | | | | | 4R | 1R | 1R | 1R | QF | 1R | LQ | LQ | 1R | SF | WD |
| Shenzhen Open (Note: The event was called the Xi'an Grand Prix (2024/2025–2025/2026)) | Tournament Not Held | | | | | | | | | | | | | 3R | 3R | LQ |
| Northern Ireland Open | Tournament Not Held | | | | | A | 2R | 1R | 2R | 2R | 2R | LQ | 2R | 2R | 1R | F |
| International Championship | Not Held | | A | LQ | A | 2R | LQ | LQ | 3R | Not Held | | | 2R | LQ | 2R | 1R |
| UK Championship | LQ | A | A | 1R | 1R | 1R | 2R | 3R | 2R | 3R | 2R | LQ | LQ | 2R | LQ | |
| Shoot Out | Non-Ranking Event | | | | | 4R | 2R | 3R | 3R | 1R | 3R | 4R | 1R | 2R | WD | |
| Scottish Open | Not Held | | MR | Not Held | | 1R | 1R | 2R | 1R | 2R | LQ | LQ | LQ | 2R | WD | |
| German Masters | LQ | A | A | LQ | WD | LQ | LQ | LQ | 1R | 2R | LQ | LQ | LQ | 3R | 2R | LQ |
| Welsh Open | LQ | A | A | 1R | 1R | 1R | 2R | 3R | 1R | 3R | 2R | 3R | 3R | 1R | 3R | |
| World Grand Prix | Not Held | | | NR | DNQ | DNQ | DNQ | DNQ | DNQ | 1R | DNQ | DNQ | DNQ | 1R | 2R | |
| Players Championship (Note: The event was called the Players Tour Championship Grand Final (2010/2011–2014/2015)) | DNQ | DNQ | DNQ | DNQ | DNQ | DNQ | DNQ | DNQ | DNQ | DNQ | DNQ | DNQ | DNQ | DNQ | DNQ | |
| World Open | LQ | A | A | LQ | NH | LQ | LQ | 2R | LQ | Not Held | | | 1R | WD | WD | |
| Tour Championship | Tournament Not Held | | | | | | | DNQ | DNQ | DNQ | DNQ | DNQ | DNQ | DNQ | DNQ | |
| World Championship | LQ | A | A | LQ | LQ | LQ | LQ | LQ | LQ | LQ | LQ | QF | F | 1R | 1R | |
Non-ranking tournaments
| Shanghai Masters | Ranking Event | | | | | | | A | A | Not Held | | | A | 1R | A | A |
| Champion of Champions | Not Held | | | A | A | A | A | A | A | A | A | A | A | QF | A | QF |
| Championship League | A | A | A | A | A | A | A | A | RR | A | A | A | RR | WD | RR | |
Former ranking tournaments
| Wuxi Classic | Non-Ranking | | A | LQ | LQ | Tournament Not Held | | | | | | | | | | |
| Australian Goldfields Open | NH | A | A | LQ | LQ | Tournament Not Held | | | | | | | | | | |
| Shanghai Masters | LQ | A | A | LQ | LQ | A | LQ | Non-Ranking | | Not Held | | | Non-Ranking Event | | | |
| Paul Hunter Classic | Minor-Ranking Event | | | | | 1R | 2R | A | NR | Tournament Not Held | | | | | | |
| Indian Open | Not Held | | | LQ | LQ | A | LQ | LQ | Tournament Not Held | | | | | | | |
| Riga Masters (Note: The event was called the Riga Open (2014/2015)) | Tournament Not Held | | | | MR | 2R | LQ | LQ | 3R | Tournament Not Held | | | | | | |
| China Championship | Tournament Not Held | | | | | NR | LQ | LQ | 1R | Tournament Not Held | | | | | | |
| WST Pro Series | Tournament Not Held | | | | | | | | | RR | Tournament Not Held | | | | | |
| Turkish Masters | Tournament Not Held | | | | | | | | | | 3R | Tournament Not Held | | | | |
| Gibraltar Open | Tournament Not Held | | | | | A | 2R | 1R | 1R | 2R | SF | Tournament Not Held | | | | |
| WST Classic | Tournament Not Held | | | | | | | | | | | 2R | Tournament Not Held | | | |
| European Masters | Tournament Not Held | | | | | LQ | 1R | 2R | 1R | 2R | 1R | 1R | LQ | Not Held | | |
| Saudi Arabia Masters | Tournament Not Held | | | | | | | | | | | | | 5R | 4R | NH |
Former non-ranking tournaments
| Six-red World Championship | A | NH | A | A | A | A | A | A | A | Not Held | | LQ | Tournament Not Held | | | |
| Haining Open | Tournament Not Held | | | | MR | QF | A | A | A | NH | A | NH | A | Not Held | | |

Performance Table Legend
| LQ | lost in the qualifying draw | #R | lost in the early rounds of the tournament (WR = Wildcard round, RR = Round robin) | QF | lost in the quarter-finals |
| SF | lost in the semi-finals | F | lost in the final | W | won the tournament |
| DNQ | did not qualify for the tournament | A | did not participate in the tournament | WD | withdrew from the tournament |

| NH / Not Held | means an event was not held. |
| NR / Non-Ranking Event | means an event is/was not a ranking event. |
| R / Ranking Event | means an event is/was a ranking event. |
| MR / Minor-Ranking Event | means an event is/was a minor-ranking event. |

== Career finals ==
=== Ranking finals: 4 (2 titles) ===
Legend
World Championship (0–1)
Other (2-1)

| Outcome | No. | Year | Championship | Opponent | Score |
|---|---|---|---|---|---|
| Runner-up | 1. | 2024 | World Snooker Championship | (England) Kyren Wilson | 14–18 |
| Winner | 1. | 2026 | Championship League | (England) David Gilbert | 3–2 |
| Winner | 2. | 2026 | British Open | (England) Mark Selby | 10–6 |
| Runner-up | 2. | 2026 | Northern Ireland Open | (England) Kyren Wilson | 2–9 |

=== Amateur finals: 4 (2 titles) ===
| Outcome | No. | Year | Championship | Opponent in the final | Score |
|---|---|---|---|---|---|
| Runner-up | 1. | 2009 | Junior Pot Black | (Scotland) Ross Muir | 0–1 |
| Runner-up | 2. | 2009 | PIOS – Event 4 | (Wales) Jamie Jones | 0–6 |
| Winner | 1. | 2010 | European Under-19 Snooker Championships | (Scotland) Anthony McGill | 6–4 |
| Winner | 2. | 2016 | European Snooker Championship | (Wales) Jamie Clarke | 7–4 |
