= European Tour 2013/2014 – Event 8 =

European Tour 2013/2014 Event 8

Tournament information
- Dates: 6–9 February 2014
- Venue: Gdynia Sports Arena
- City: Gdynia
- Country: Poland
- Organisation: World Snooker
- Format: Minor-ranking event
- Total prize fund: €125,600
- Winner's share: €25,000
- Highest break: Shaun Murphy (ENG) (147)

Final
- Champion: Shaun Murphy (ENG)
- Runner-up: Fergal O'Brien (IRL)
- Score: 4–1

The European Tour 2013/2014 – Event 8 (also known as the 2014 Gdynia Open) was a professional minor-ranking snooker tournament that took place between 6–9 February 2014 at the Gdynia Sports Arena in Gdynia, Poland.

Neil Robertson was the defending champion, but he lost 3–4 against Alan McManus in the last 64.

Shaun Murphy won in the final 4–1 against Fergal O'Brien. This was Murphy's first title since the 2011 Brazil Masters 29 months earlier. Murphy also made the 104th official maximum break during his last 16 match against Jamie Jones. This was Murphy's third official 147 break, and the seventh in the 2013/2014 season.

== Prize fund and ranking points ==
The breakdown of prize money and ranking points of the event is shown below:

	Prize fund	Ranking points^{1}
Winner	€25,000	2,000
Runner-up	€12,000	1,600
Semi-finalist	€6,000	1,280
Quarter-finalist	€4,000	1,000
Last 16	€2,300	760
Last 32	€1,200	560
Last 64	€700	360
Maximum break	€600	–
Total	€125,600	–

- ^{1} Only professional players can earn ranking points.

== Main draw ==
=== Preliminary rounds ===
==== Round 1 ====
Best of 7 frames

(Poland) Krzysztof Wrobel	4–1	(Poland) Maciej Maciejwski

==== Round 2 ====
Best of 7 frames

(Poland) Marcin Nitschke	4–1	(Poland) Grzegorz Biernadski
(Poland) Maciej Sarapuk	0–4	(England) Thomas Goldstein
(Poland) Kacper Filipiak	4–0	(Poland) Tomasz Malecki
(England) Oliver Brown	4–0	(Poland) Michal Ebert
(Portugal) Filipe Cardoso	3–4	(Poland) Wojciech Przylucki
(Germany) Felix Buchfeld	n/s–w/o	(Poland) Mateusz Goslinowski
(Poland) Marcin Bek	1–4	(Poland) Rafał Jewtuch
(England) Michael Wild	w/d–w/o	(Scotland) Ross Higgins
(Norway) Anita Maflin	0–4	(England) Joe Steele
(Scotland) Michael Collumb	4–0	(Poland) Antoni Kowalski
(Poland) Mateusz Baranowski	0–4	(England) Sanderson Lam
(Poland) Kevin Dabrowski	0–4	(Belgium) Hans Blanckaert
(Poland) Konrad Piekarczyk	0–4	(Scotland) David Frew
(Poland) Mateusz Nowak	4–2	(Poland) Wojciech Bojewski
(England) Kashif Khan	w/d–w/o	(England) Sam Harvey
(Poland) Krzysztof Wrobel	3–4	(England) Michael Georgiou

(Poland) Karol Lelek	4–0	(Poland) Rafal Gorecki
(Ukraine) Tetyana Volovelska	0–4	(England) Christopher Keogan
(England) Oliver Lines	4–0	(England) Brian Cox
(Wales) Gareth Allen	4–1	(England) Charlie Walters
(Poland) Adrian Materek	1–4	(Northern Ireland) Billy Brown
(Poland) Oliwia Lachowicz	w/d–w/o	(England) Robert Valiant
(Poland) Kamil Zubrzycki	w/d–w/o	(Wales) Jamie Clarke
(Poland) Maciej Kielkowicz	0–4	(England) Jeff Cundy
(England) Nathan Jones	4–2	(Poland) Maciej Michowski
(England) Ben Harrison	w/d–w/o	(England) Matthew Hudson
(Poland) Michal Matuszczyk	0–4	(England) Ricky Norris
(England) Matthew Day	4–1	(England) Ryan Causton
(Poland) Konrad Sor	1–4	(Poland) Marcin Kolibski
(Poland) Tomasz Marczak	0–4	(Poland) Jaroslaw Kowalski
(Poland) Pawel Rogoza	2–4	(Poland) Adam Stefanow
(Poland) Denis Lachowicz	w/d–w/o	(England) Sydney Wilson

==== Round 3 ====
Best of 7 frames

(Poland) Marcin Nitschke	4–2	(England) Thomas Goldstein
(Poland) Kacper Filipiak	4–2	(England) Oliver Brown
(Poland) Wojciech Przylucki	4–0	(Poland) Mateusz Goslinowski
(Poland) Rafał Jewtuch	4–3	(Scotland) Ross Higgins
(England) Joe Steele	0–4	(Scotland) Michael Collumb
(England) Sanderson Lam	4–2	(Belgium) Hans Blanckaert
(Scotland) David Frew	4–1	(Poland) Mateusz Nowak
(England) Sam Harvey	1–4	(England) Michael Georgiou

(Poland) Karol Lelek	1–4	(England) Christopher Keogan
(England) Oliver Lines	1–4	(Wales) Gareth Allen
(Northern Ireland) Billy Brown	0–4	(England) Robert Valiant
(Wales) Jamie Clarke	4–3	(England) Jeff Cundy
(England) Nathan Jones	w/o–w/d	(England) Matthew Hudson
(England) Ricky Norris	2–4	(England) Matthew Day
(Poland) Marcin Kolibski	4–1	(Poland) Jaroslaw Kowalski
(Poland) Adam Stefanow	4–1	(England) Sydney Wilson

=== Main rounds ===
==== Top half ====
===== Section 1 =====
Last 128; Best of 7 frames
(England) Mark Selby	4
(China) Chen Zhe	0
(England) Anthony Hamilton	4
(Poland) Marcin Nitschke	1
(Wales) Matthew Stevens	1
(England) Allan Taylor	4
(England) Matthew Selt	4
(Qatar) Ahmed Saif	2
(England) Martin Gould	4
(Poland) Kacper Filipiak	1
(England) Peter Lines	4
(China) Xiao Guodong	3
(England) Robert Milkins	4
(England) Paul Davison	3
(England) John Astley	3
(Scotland) Fraser Patrick	4

Last 64; Best of 7 frames
(England) Mark Selby	3
(England) Anthony Hamilton	4
(England) Allan Taylor	0
(England) Matthew Selt	4
(England) Martin Gould	4
(England) Peter Lines	1
(England) Robert Milkins	4
(Scotland) Fraser Patrick	0

Last 32; Best of 7 frames
(England) Anthony Hamilton	0
(England) Matthew Selt	4
(England) Martin Gould	2
(England) Robert Milkins	4

Last 16; Best of 7 frames
(England) Matthew Selt	4
(England) Robert Milkins	0

===== Section 2 =====
Last 128; Best of 7 frames
(England) Judd Trump	4
(China) Liu Chuang	2
(England) Chris Wakelin	4
(Switzerland) Alexander Ursenbacher	2
(England) Mike Dunn	4
(Scotland) Michael Leslie	2
(England) Steve Davis	4
(Poland) Wojciech Przylucki	1
(England) Tom Ford	4
(Poland) Rafał Jewtuch	0
(India) Aditya Mehta	4
(Thailand) James Wattana	0
(England) Mark King	4
(England) Chris Norbury	3
(England) Joe Perry	4
(Wales) Daniel Wells	1

Last 64; Best of 7 frames
(England) Judd Trump	4
(England) Chris Wakelin	0
(England) Mike Dunn	2
(England) Steve Davis	4
(England) Tom Ford	4
(India) Aditya Mehta	1
(England) Mark King	4
(England) Joe Perry	1

Last 32; Best of 7 frames
(England) Judd Trump	4
(England) Steve Davis	3
(England) Tom Ford	3
(England) Mark King	4

Last 16; Best of 7 frames
(England) Judd Trump	4
(England) Mark King	3

===== Section 3 =====
Last 128; Best of 7 frames
(England) Michael Holt	4
(China) Li Hang	1
(Wales) Jamie Jones	4
(Scotland) Michael Collumb	2
(England) Mark Davis	4
(Thailand) Ratchayothin Yotharuck	2
(England) Martin O'Donnell	4
(Wales) Jak Jones	3
(England) Kyren Wilson	3
(China) Tian Pengfei	4
(England) Robbie Williams	4
(China) Li Yan	0
(England) Stuart Bingham	4
(England) Sanderson Lam	0
(England) Shaun Murphy	4
(England) Jamie O'Neil	0

Last 64; Best of 7 frames
(England) Michael Holt	0
(Wales) Jamie Jones	4
(England) Mark Davis	1
(England) Martin O'Donnell	4
(China) Tian Pengfei	4
(England) Robbie Williams	2
(England) Stuart Bingham	1
(England) Shaun Murphy	4

Last 32; Best of 7 frames
(Wales) Jamie Jones	4
(England) Martin O'Donnell	3
(China) Tian Pengfei	1
(England) Shaun Murphy	4

Last 16; Best of 7 frames
(Wales) Jamie Jones	2
(England) Shaun Murphy	4

===== Section 4 =====
Last 128; Best of 7 frames
(Scotland) Stephen Maguire	4
(China) Cao Xinlong	0
(Wales) Ryan Day	w/o
(Finland) Robin Hull	w/d
(England) Gary Wilson	4
(England) Adam Duffy	3
(England) Michael Wasley	4
(Scotland) David Frew	0
(England) Barry Hawkins	4
(England) Ryan Clark	1
(Thailand) Thanawat Thirapongpaiboon	w/d
(England) Jimmy White	w/o
(Scotland) John Higgins	4
(England) Michael Georgiou	0
(Scotland) Anthony McGill	3
(England) Elliot Slessor	4

Last 64; Best of 7 frames
(Scotland) Stephen Maguire	4
(Wales) Ryan Day	0
(England) Gary Wilson	3
(England) Michael Wasley	4
(England) Barry Hawkins	4
(England) Jimmy White	1
(Scotland) John Higgins	4
(England) Elliot Slessor	3

Last 32; Best of 7 frames
(Scotland) Stephen Maguire	4
(England) Michael Wasley	1
(England) Barry Hawkins	3
(Scotland) John Higgins	4

Last 16; Best of 7 frames
(Scotland) Stephen Maguire	4
(Scotland) John Higgins	2

==== Bottom half ====
===== Section 5 =====
Last 128; Best of 7 frames
(England) Ricky Walden	w/d
(England) Christopher Keogan	w/o
(Scotland) Marcus Campbell	4
(England) Andrew Higginson	1
(England) Joel Walker	1
(Wales) Gareth Allen	4
(England) Andrew Norman	4
(England) Dave Harold	3
(Northern Ireland) Joe Swail	4
(Scotland) Ross Muir	0
(Wales) Michael White	3
(England) Craig Steadman	4
(England) Alfie Burden	4
(Thailand) Noppon Saengkham	3
(England) Jimmy Robertson	4
(Wales) Andrew Pagett	3

Last 64; Best of 7 frames
(England) Christopher Keogan	1
(Scotland) Marcus Campbell	4
(Wales) Gareth Allen	4
(England) Andrew Norman	2
(Northern Ireland) Joe Swail	3
(England) Craig Steadman	4
(England) Alfie Burden	4
(England) Jimmy Robertson	1

Last 32; Best of 7 frames
(Scotland) Marcus Campbell	4
(Wales) Gareth Allen	3
(England) Craig Steadman	2
(England) Alfie Burden	4

Last 16; Best of 7 frames
(Scotland) Marcus Campbell	1
(England) Alfie Burden	4

===== Section 6 =====
Last 128; Best of 7 frames
(Hong Kong) Marco Fu	4
(England) Robert Valiant	0
(England) Nigel Bond	4
(England) Hammad Miah	1
(England) Sam Baird	4
(Australia) Vinnie Calabrese	2
(Belgium) Luca Brecel	1
(Wales) Jamie Clarke	4
(England) Barry Pinches	4
(England) Nathan Jones	3
(India) Pankaj Advani	2
(Malta) Alex Borg	4
(England) Ian Burns	4
(China) Yu Delu	0
(Scotland) Scott Donaldson	4
(England) James Cahill	3

Last 64; Best of 7 frames
(Hong Kong) Marco Fu	0
(England) Nigel Bond	4
(England) Sam Baird	4
(Wales) Jamie Clarke	0
(England) Barry Pinches	4
(Malta) Alex Borg	1
(England) Ian Burns	4
(Scotland) Scott Donaldson	1

Last 32; Best of 7 frames
(England) Nigel Bond	3
(England) Sam Baird	4
(England) Barry Pinches	4
(England) Ian Burns	3

Last 16; Best of 7 frames
(England) Sam Baird	4
(England) Barry Pinches	2

===== Section 7 =====
Last 128; Best of 7 frames
(England) David Gilbert	4
(China) Cao Yupeng	1
(England) David Grace	4
(England) Matthew Day	0
(England) Mark Joyce	4
(Republic of Ireland) Ken Doherty	3
(Northern Ireland) Gerard Greene	3
(China) Zhang Anda	4
(Norway) Kurt Maflin	2
(England) Lee Page	4
(England) Rod Lawler	4
(Poland) Marcin Kolibski	0
(England) Ben Woollaston	1
(England) Rory McLeod	4
(Republic of Ireland) David Morris	w/d
(England) Jamie Cope	w/o

Last 64; Best of 7 frames
(England) David Gilbert	4
(England) David Grace	1
(England) Mark Joyce	1
(China) Zhang Anda	4
(England) Lee Page	2
(England) Rod Lawler	4
(England) Rory McLeod	1
(England) Jamie Cope	4

Last 32; Best of 7 frames
(England) David Gilbert	3
(China) Zhang Anda	4
(England) Rod Lawler	4
(England) Jamie Cope	0

Last 16; Best of 7 frames
(China) Zhang Anda	4
(England) Rod Lawler	1

===== Section 8 =====
Last 128; Best of 7 frames
(Scotland) Graeme Dott	4
(England) Peter Ebdon	3
(England) Stuart Carrington	3
(Germany) Patrick Einsle	4
(Australia) Neil Robertson	4
(Poland) Adam Stefanow	1
(Scotland) Alan McManus	4
(England) Sean O'Sullivan	3
(Republic of Ireland) Fergal O'Brien	4
(England) Alex Davies	1
(Malta) Tony Drago	4
(England) Liam Highfield	0
(Wales) Dominic Dale	4
(Thailand) Dechawat Poomjaeng	1
(Wales) Mark Williams	3
(China) Liang Wenbo	4

Last 64; Best of 7 frames
(Scotland) Graeme Dott	4
(Germany) Patrick Einsle	2
(Australia) Neil Robertson	3
(Scotland) Alan McManus	4
(Republic of Ireland) Fergal O'Brien	4
(Malta) Tony Drago	3
(Wales) Dominic Dale	4
(China) Liang Wenbo	1

Last 32; Best of 7 frames
(Scotland) Graeme Dott	1
(Scotland) Alan McManus	4
(Republic of Ireland) Fergal O'Brien	4
(Wales) Dominic Dale	3

Last 16; Best of 7 frames
(Scotland) Alan McManus	1
(Republic of Ireland) Fergal O'Brien	4

==== Finals ====
Quarter-finals; Best of 7 frames		Semi-finals; Best of 7 frames		Final; Best of 7 frames
(England) Matthew Selt	4
(England) Judd Trump	1	(England) Matthew Selt	1
(England) Shaun Murphy	4	(England) Shaun Murphy	4
(Scotland) Stephen Maguire	3			(England) Shaun Murphy	4
(England) Alfie Burden	3			(Republic of Ireland) Fergal O'Brien	1
(England) Sam Baird	4	(England) Sam Baird	1
(China) Zhang Anda	2	(Republic of Ireland) Fergal O'Brien	4
(Republic of Ireland) Fergal O'Brien	4

== Century breaks ==
- 147, 138, 136, 128, 103 – Shaun Murphy
- 138 – Liu Chuang
- 137 – Steve Davis
- 136, 133 – Alfie Burden
- 136, 120, 107 – Martin Gould
- 133, 111, 106, 103 – Sam Baird
- 129, 100 – Mark King
- 127 – Gareth Allen
- 126 – Peter Ebdon
- 125, 109 – Alan McManus
- 123 – Rod Lawler
- 121, 100 – Mark Davis
- 118 – Marcus Campbell
- 113 – Fergal O'Brien
- 113 – Zhang Anda
- 112, 100 – Neil Robertson
- 110 – Mark Selby
- 108 – Stephen Maguire
- 106 – Chris Norbury
- 106 – Matthew Selt
- 106 – Kurt Maflin
- 105 – Judd Trump
- 104 – Jak Jones
- 103 – Tian Pengfei
- 102 – Ken Doherty
- 101 – David Grace
- 100 – Ian Burns
- 100 – Dominic Dale
