= European Tour 2015/2016 – Event 6 =

European Tour 2015/2016 Event 6

Tournament information
- Dates: 23–28 February 2016
- Venue: Gdynia Sports Arena
- City: Gdynia
- Country: Poland
- Organisation: World Snooker
- Format: Minor-ranking event
- Total prize fund: €125,000
- Winner's share: €25,000
- Highest break: Anthony Hamilton (ENG) (139); Rod Lawler (ENG) (139)

Final
- Champion: Mark Selby (ENG)
- Runner-up: Martin Gould (ENG)
- Score: 4–1

The European Tour 2015/2016 – Event 6 (also known as the 2016 Gdynia Open) was a professional minor-ranking snooker tournament held between 23 and 28 February 2016 in Gdynia, Poland.

Neil Robertson was the defending champion, but he chose not to defend his title. Local 12-year-old Antoni Kowalski attracted attention with a 4–1 win over Liam Taylor in the opening round, before being beaten 4–0 by Richard Beckham in the next.

== Prize fund ==
The breakdown of prize money of the event is shown below:

	Prize fund
Winner	€25,000
Runner-up	€12,000
Semi-finalist	€6,000
Quarter-finalist	€4,000
Last 16	€2,300
Last 32	€1,200
Last 64	€700
Total	€125,000

== Main draw ==
=== Preliminary rounds ===
==== Round 1 ====
Best of 7 frames

(England) Robbie Purdham	w/d–w/o	(England) Simon Dent
(Republic of Ireland) Mark Dooley	1–4	(England) Ashley Hugill
(Germany) Robin Otto	4–1	(England) Majid Khan
(England) Peter Devlin	1–4	(Latvia) Rodion Judin
(Poland) Felix Vidler	w/o–w/d	(England) Jamie Barrett
(England) David Ackers	0–4	(England) Saqib Nasir
(England) Richard Somauroo	4–1	(Ukraine) Andrii Buchynskyi
(Poland) Rafal Jewtuch	w/o–n/s	(Poland) Phan Quoc Binh
(England) Scott Lyons	4–3	(England) Brandon Sargeant
(England) Freddie Blunden	4–0	(England) Rees Carter
(England) Phil O'Kane	4–0	(Poland) Grzegorz Loniewski
(England) Michael Rhodes	w/o–n/s	(Poland) Wojciech Bojewski
(England) Jeremy Lee	4–0	(Finland) Aki Suutari
(England) Adam King	1–4	(Belgium) Jurian Heusdens
(England) Ryan Causton	4–1	(England) Daniel Womersley
(Poland) Jaroslaw Kowalski	2–4	(Austria) Andreas Ploner
(England) Adam Bobat	4–0	(England) Kieran Briggs
(Poland) Michal Matuszczyk	1–4	(England) Matt Lancaster
(Poland) Marcin Kolibski	0–4	(England) Gareth Green
(Republic of Ireland) Dessie Sheehan	0–4	(England) Nico Elton
(Poland) Rafal Szymanek	0–4	(Malta) Alex Borg
(Republic of Ireland) Josh Boileau	3–4	(England) Declan Bristow
(Wales) Thomas Rees	4–1	(England) Neil Guidon
(England) Andrew Greaves	3–4	(Northern Ireland) Conor McCormack
(England) Chris Norbury	4–3	(England) Zack Richardson
(Poland) Maciej Kielkowicz	0–4	(Russia) Aleksandr Kurgankov

(Denmark) Hussam Al-Shaffar	4–1	(Poland) Damian Adamus
(England) Lewis Gillen	4–0	(England) Aaron Lowe
(France) Stephane Ochoiski	n/s–w/o	(England) Ashley Carty
(Norway) Bjorn Gulbrandsen	1–4	(England) Matthew Pudney
(England) Joe Roberts	4–1	(Scotland) Mark Owens
(Poland) Tomasz Gieraltowski	1–4	(England) Manasawin Phetmalaikul
(England) Joshua Baddeley	4–0	(Poland) Ariel Trebocha
(Bosnia and Herzegovina) Danijel Vranjes	3–4	(England) Adam Longley
(England) Adam Edge	4–3	(Republic of Ireland) Tony Corrigan
(Poland) Antoni Kowalski	4–1	(England) Liam Taylor
(Republic of Ireland) Daniel O'Regan	4–1	(Poland) Krzysztof Kubicki
(England) Joe O'Connor	3–4	(Wales) Kishan Hirani
(Germany) Felix Frede	3–4	(Scotland) David Greig
(Germany) Daniel Schneider	w/o–w/d	Israel Pertman
(Wales) Jamie Clarke	4–1	(Scotland) Lee Mein
(England) Hammad Miah	4–2	(England) Dean Sheridan
(Belgium) Tomasz Skalski	4–0	(England) James Clements
(Poland) Kacper Filipiak	4–2	(England) George Pragnall
(England) Adam Duffy	4–0	(Poland) Wiktor Doberschotz
(Poland) Tytus Pawlak	0–4	(England) Christopher Keogan
(Sweden) Ron Florax	0–4	(Poland) Adam Stefanow
(England) Mick Dagostino	0–4	(Germany) Simon Lichtenberg
(Poland) Maciej Sarapuk	0–4	(Scotland) Michael Collumb
(Germany) Lukas Kleckers	4–0	(Poland) Waldemar Matuszkiewicz
(Jamaica) Paul Moss	0–4	(England) Sam Craigie
(England) Jamie O'Neill	3–4	(Poland) Grzegorz Biernadski

==== Round 2 ====
Best of 7 frames

(Poland) Paul Stelmaszuk	1–4	(England) Simon Dent
(Republic of Ireland) Anthony Bonnar	1–4	(England) Ashley Hugill
(England) Charlie Walters	2–4	(Germany) Robin Otto
(Scotland) Dylan Craig	4–0	(Latvia) Rodion Judin
(England) Matthew Glasby	4–0	(Poland) Felix Vidler
(England) Michael Williams	4–3	(England) Saqib Nasir
(Poland) Mateusz Baranowski	4–0	(England) Richard Somauroo
(England) Bhavesh Sodha	0–4	(Poland) Rafal Jewtuch
(Poland) Bartosz Olchowka	1–4	(England) Scott Lyons
(England) Freddie Blunden	0–4	(England) Phil O'Kane
(Poland) Piotr Olejnik	0–4	(England) Michael Rhodes
(Northern Ireland) Declan Brennan	4–0	(England) Jeremy Lee
(England) Louis Heathcote	4–2	(Belgium) Jurian Heusdens
(Poland) Daniel Holoyda	3–4	(England) Ryan Causton
(Israel) Shay Arama	n/s–w/o	(Austria) Andreas Ploner
(England) Joshua Cooper	4–3	(England) Adam Bobat
(England) Andy Maivel	4–1	(England) Matt Lancaster
(England) Billy Brown	2–4	(England) Gareth Green
(England) Nico Elton	3–4	(Malta) Alex Borg
(England) Elliot Slessor	4–2	(England) Declan Bristow
(England) Jenson Kendrick	2–4	(Wales) Thomas Rees
(Denmark) Rune Kampe	w/d–w/o	(Northern Ireland) Conor McCormack
(Poland) Andrzej Pakula	1–4	(England) Chris Norbury
(England) Matthew Day	4–0	(Russia) Aleksandr Kurgankov
(Scotland) Marc J Davis	4–0	(Denmark) Hussam Al-Shaffar

(England) Jake Nicholson	4–3	(England) Lewis Gillen
(England) Joe Steele	1–4	(England) Ashley Carty
(England) Gary Frederick	4–0	(England) Matthew Pudney
(Scotland) Chris Totten	3–4	(England) Joe Roberts
(England) Anthony Green	3–4	(England) Manasawin Phetmalaikul
(England) Chris Jones	1–4	(England) Joshua Baddeley
(Latvia) Maris Volajs	2–4	(England) Adam Longley
(England) Mohammed Rangzib	4–2	(England) Adam Edge
(England) Richard Beckham	4–0	(Poland) Antoni Kowalski
(Poland) Lukasz Guzowski	0–4	(Republic of Ireland) Daniel O'Regan
(Belgium) Hans Blanckaert	1–4	(Wales) Kishan Hirani
(Poland) Maciej Michowski	1–4	(Scotland) David Greig
(England) Sam Thistlewhite	3–4	(Germany) Daniel Schneider
(Scotland) Ross Higgins	0–4	(Wales) Jamie Clarke
(Finland) Jyri Virtanen	0–4	(England) Hammad Miah
(England) Karl Townsend	4–1	(Belgium) Tomasz Skalski
(Poland) Karol Lelek	0–4	(Poland) Kacper Filipiak
(Poland) Krzysztof Drazkiewicz	0–4	(England) Adam Duffy
(Jordan) Essam Saadeh	0–4	(England) Christopher Keogan
(Malta) Brian Cini	w/d–w/o	(Poland) Adam Stefanow
(Wales) Alex Taubman	4–2	(Germany) Simon Lichtenberg
(Slovakia) Patrik Sedlak	n/s–w/o	(Scotland) Michael Collumb
(Scotland) Gary Thomson	2–4	(Germany) Lukas Kleckers
(Wales) Ben Jones	0–4	(England) Sam Craigie
(England) Oliver Brown	4–1	(Poland) Grzegorz Biernadski

==== Round 3 ====
Best of 7 frames

(England) Simon Dent	1–4	(England) Ashley Hugill
(Germany) Robin Otto	0–4	(Scotland) Dylan Craig
(England) Matthew Glasby	0–4	(England) Michael Williams
(Poland) Mateusz Baranowski	4–0	(Poland) Rafal Jewtuch
(England) Scott Lyons	0–4	(England) Phil O'Kane
(England) Michael Rhodes	4–1	(Northern Ireland) Declan Brennan
(England) Louis Heathcote	1–4	(England) Ryan Causton
(Austria) Andreas Ploner	4–3	(England) Joshua Cooper
(England) Andy Maivel	0–4	(England) Gareth Green
(Malta) Alex Borg	3–4	(England) Elliot Slessor
(Wales) Thomas Rees	4–1	(Northern Ireland) Conor McCormack
(England) Chris Norbury	4–0	(England) Matthew Day
(Scotland) Marc J Davis	4–1	(England) Jake Nicholson

(England) Ashley Carty	4–1	(England) Gary Frederick
(England) Joe Roberts	4–1	(England) Manasawin Phetmalaikul
(England) Joshua Baddeley	4–0	(England) Adam Longley
(England) Mohammed Rangzib	0–4	(England) Richard Beckham
(Republic of Ireland) Daniel O'Regan	1–4	(Wales) Kishan Hirani
(Scotland) David Greig	4–2	(Germany) Daniel Schneider
(Wales) Jamie Clarke	4–3	(England) Hammad Miah
(England) Karl Townsend	0–4	(Poland) Kacper Filipiak
(England) Adam Duffy	4–2	(England) Christopher Keogan
(Poland) Adam Stefanow	4–2	(Wales) Alex Taubman
(Scotland) Michael Collumb	4–2	(Germany) Lukas Kleckers
(England) Sam Craigie	1–4	(England) Oliver Brown

=== Main rounds ===
==== Top half ====
===== Section 1 =====
Last 128; Best of 7 frames
(England) Barry Hawkins	4
(China) Yu Delu	0
(England) Jimmy Robertson	4
(England) Michael Wasley	2
(England) Joe Perry	4
(England) Ashley Hugill	2
(England) Oliver Lines	2
(Scotland) Dylan Craig	4
(England) Stuart Bingham	3
(Scotland) Fraser Patrick	4
(Wales) Daniel Wells	0
(Scotland) Ross Muir	4
(China) Zhou Yuelong	w/o
(Brazil) Itaro Santos	w/d
(England) Judd Trump	w/d
(England) Michael Williams	w/o

Last 64; Best of 7 frames
(England) Barry Hawkins	4
(England) Jimmy Robertson	3
(England) Joe Perry	4
(Scotland) Dylan Craig	1
(Scotland) Fraser Patrick	0
(Scotland) Ross Muir	4
(China) Zhou Yuelong	4
(England) Michael Williams	1

Last 32; Best of 7 frames
(England) Barry Hawkins	4
(England) Joe Perry	2
(Scotland) Ross Muir	3
(China) Zhou Yuelong	4

Last 16; Best of 7 frames
(England) Barry Hawkins	4
(China) Zhou Yuelong	3

===== Section 2 =====
Last 128; Best of 7 frames
(England) Michael Holt	4
(England) Ian Glover	3
(England) Martin O'Donnell	4
(Poland) Mateusz Baranowski	1
(England) Robert Milkins	1
(England) Peter Lines	4
(England) Kyren Wilson	4
(Wales) Duane Jones	1
(Malaysia) Thor Chuan Leong	4
(England) Phil O'Kane	2
(Norway) Kurt Maflin	4
(England) Michael Rhodes	1
(India) Aditya Mehta	w/d
(Wales) Gareth Allen	w/o
(Wales) Mark Williams	1
(China) Ding Junhui	4

Last 64; Best of 7 frames
(England) Michael Holt	1
(England) Martin O'Donnell	4
(England) Peter Lines	2
(England) Kyren Wilson	4
(Malaysia) Thor Chuan Leong	4
(Norway) Kurt Maflin	3
(Wales) Gareth Allen	0
(China) Ding Junhui	4

Last 32; Best of 7 frames
(England) Martin O'Donnell	1
(England) Kyren Wilson	4
(Malaysia) Thor Chuan Leong	4
(China) Ding Junhui	1

Last 16; Best of 7 frames
(England) Kyren Wilson	4
(Malaysia) Thor Chuan Leong	0

===== Section 3 =====
Last 128; Best of 7 frames
(Wales) Ryan Day	4
(England) Mark Joyce	1
(Scotland) Michael Leslie	2
(England) Ryan Causton	4
(Scotland) Scott Donaldson	4
(England) Sydney Wilson	1
(England) David Gilbert	w/o
(Iran) Hossein Vafaei	w/d
(England) Ben Woollaston	4
(Austria) Andreas Ploner	1
(Wales) Lee Walker	4
(England) Gareth Green	1
(China) Li Hang	4
(England) Paul Davison	3
(England) Mike Dunn	4
(Isle of Man) Darryl Hill	2

Last 64; Best of 7 frames
(Wales) Ryan Day	3
(England) Ryan Causton	4
(Scotland) Scott Donaldson	3
(England) David Gilbert	4
(England) Ben Woollaston	4
(Wales) Lee Walker	2
(China) Li Hang	4
(England) Mike Dunn	3

Last 32; Best of 7 frames
(England) Ryan Causton	4
(England) David Gilbert	1
(England) Ben Woollaston	4
(China) Li Hang	1

Last 16; Best of 7 frames
(England) Ryan Causton	0
(England) Ben Woollaston	4

===== Section 4 =====
Last 128; Best of 7 frames
(China) Liang Wenbo	0
(England) Elliot Slessor	4
(England) Ian Burns	0
(Finland) Robin Hull	4
(Scotland) Anthony McGill	2
(England) Liam Highfield	4
(England) Stuart Carrington	4
(Wales) Thomas Rees	0
(Wales) Dominic Dale	4
(England) Allan Taylor	2
(England) Robbie Williams	2
(England) Martin Gould	4
(Wales) Jamie Jones	4
(England) Chris Norbury	1
(England) Shaun Murphy	4
(Scotland) Marc J Davis	2

Last 64; Best of 7 frames
(England) Elliot Slessor	1
(Finland) Robin Hull	4
(England) Liam Highfield	4
(England) Stuart Carrington	0
(Wales) Dominic Dale	1
(England) Martin Gould	4
(Wales) Jamie Jones	4
(England) Shaun Murphy	1

Last 32; Best of 7 frames
(Finland) Robin Hull	3
(England) Liam Highfield	4
(England) Martin Gould	4
(Wales) Jamie Jones	3

Last 16; Best of 7 frames
(England) Liam Highfield	1
(England) Martin Gould	4

==== Bottom half ====
===== Section 5 =====
Last 128; Best of 7 frames
(Hong Kong) Marco Fu	4
(Australia) Vinnie Calabrese	1
(England) Rod Lawler	3
(Republic of Ireland) David Morris	4
(China) Zhang Anda	4
(England) Barry Pinches	2
(England) Matthew Selt	4
(England) Ashley Carty	3
(Scotland) Graeme Dott	2
(Scotland) Rhys Clark	4
(England) Mitchell Mann	4
(England) Sanderson Lam	3
(England) Jack Lisowski	4
(China) Cao Yupeng	2
(Scotland) Alan McManus	3
(Thailand) Dechawat Poomjaeng	4

Last 64; Best of 7 frames
(Hong Kong) Marco Fu	4
(Republic of Ireland) David Morris	0
(China) Zhang Anda	0
(England) Matthew Selt	4
(Scotland) Rhys Clark	3
(England) Mitchell Mann	4
(England) Jack Lisowski	4
(Thailand) Dechawat Poomjaeng	2

Last 32; Best of 7 frames
(Hong Kong) Marco Fu	4
(England) Matthew Selt	0
(England) Mitchell Mann	4
(England) Jack Lisowski	2

Last 16; Best of 7 frames
(Hong Kong) Marco Fu	4
(England) Mitchell Mann	1

===== Section 6 =====
Last 128; Best of 7 frames
(England) Mark Selby	4
(England) Joe Roberts	2
(Scotland) John Higgins	w/o
(Thailand) James Wattana	w/d
(England) David Grace	3
(England) Steven Hallworth	4
(Belgium) Luca Brecel	4
(Northern Ireland) Joe Swail	3
(England) Sam Baird	4
(England) Joshua Baddeley	0
(England) Chris Wakelin	2
(England) Richard Beckham	4
(England) Gary Wilson	2
(Thailand) Thepchaiya Un-Nooh	4
(Wales) Michael White	4
(Wales) Kishan Hirani	1

Last 64; Best of 7 frames
(England) Mark Selby	4
(Scotland) John Higgins	2
(England) Steven Hallworth	3
(Belgium) Luca Brecel	4
(England) Sam Baird	4
(England) Richard Beckham	1
(Thailand) Thepchaiya Un-Nooh	2
(Wales) Michael White	4

Last 32; Best of 7 frames
(England) Mark Selby	4
(Belgium) Luca Brecel	3
(England) Sam Baird	4
(Wales) Michael White	2

Last 16; Best of 7 frames
(England) Mark Selby	4
(England) Sam Baird	3

===== Section 7 =====
Last 128; Best of 7 frames
(England) Tom Ford	4
(Thailand) Noppon Saengkham	3
(England) Sean O'Sullivan	4
(England) Michael Georgiou	2
(Scotland) Stephen Maguire	4
(Wales) Matthew Stevens	2
(England) Alfie Burden	4
(Scotland) David Greig	3
(England) Andrew Higginson	4
(Wales) Jamie Clarke	3
(Northern Ireland) Gerard Greene	3
(Poland) Kacper Filipiak	4
(Republic of Ireland) Ken Doherty	w/d
(England) Adam Duffy	w/o
(China) Tian Pengfei	4
(Poland) Adam Stefanow	1

Last 64; Best of 7 frames
(England) Tom Ford	4
(England) Sean O'Sullivan	2
(Scotland) Stephen Maguire	4
(England) Alfie Burden	1
(England) Andrew Higginson	4
(Poland) Kacper Filipiak	3
(England) Adam Duffy	2
(China) Tian Pengfei	4

Last 32; Best of 7 frames
(England) Tom Ford	4
(Scotland) Stephen Maguire	0
(England) Andrew Higginson	4
(China) Tian Pengfei	2

Last 16; Best of 7 frames
(England) Tom Ford	0
(England) Andrew Higginson	4

===== Section 8 =====
Last 128; Best of 7 frames
(England) Mark King	4
(England) Michael Wild	2
(England) Zak Surety	2
(Scotland) Eden Sharav	4
(England) Joel Walker	2
(England) Anthony Hamilton	4
(England) Peter Ebdon	4
(Scotland) Michael Collumb	3
(England) Mark Davis	4
(Pakistan) Hamza Akbar	2
(Republic of Ireland) Fergal O'Brien	4
(England) Oliver Brown	1
(England) Jason Weston	w/d
(England) Craig Steadman	w/o
(England) Rory McLeod	4
(England) Chris Melling	1

Last 64; Best of 7 frames
(England) Mark King	4
(Scotland) Eden Sharav	1
(England) Anthony Hamilton	4
(England) Peter Ebdon	1
(England) Mark Davis	3
(Republic of Ireland) Fergal O'Brien	4
(England) Craig Steadman	1
(England) Rory McLeod	4

Last 32; Best of 7 frames
(England) Mark King	4
(England) Anthony Hamilton	2
(Republic of Ireland) Fergal O'Brien	2
(England) Rory McLeod	4

Last 16; Best of 7 frames
(England) Mark King	4
(England) Rory McLeod	1

==== Finals ====
Quarter-finals; Best of 7 frames		Semi-finals; Best of 7 frames		Final; Best of 7 frames
(England) Barry Hawkins	3
(England) Kyren Wilson	4	(England) Kyren Wilson	2
(England) Ben Woollaston	1	(England) Martin Gould	4
(England) Martin Gould	4			(England) Martin Gould	1
(Hong Kong) Marco Fu	1			(England) Mark Selby	4
(England) Mark Selby	4	(England) Mark Selby	4
(England) Andrew Higginson	4	(England) Andrew Higginson	2
(England) Mark King	3

== Century breaks ==
- 139 – Anthony Hamilton
- 139 – Rod Lawler
- 136, 122 – Andrew Higginson
- 136 – Noppon Saengkham
- 135, 123, 103 – Barry Hawkins
- 133 – Richard Beckham
- 132 – Tian Pengfei
- 130, 108 – Stephen Maguire
- 129 – Martin O'Donnell
- 128 – Graeme Dott
- 127, 125, 116, 104 – Martin Gould
- 125, 107, 103 – Marco Fu
- 125, 101 – Sam Baird
- 125 – Robbie Williams
- 123, 100 – Mitchell Mann
- 123 – Zhang Anda
- 121, 110, 104, 101 – Mark Selby
- 120 – Mark King
- 119 – Mark Davis
- 118, 104 – Joe Perry
- 115 – Robin Hull
- 114, 108 – Ryan Day
- 112, 103, 100 – Kyren Wilson
- 111 – Luca Brecel
- 109 – Rory McLeod
- 107 – Ben Woollaston
- 105 – Zhou Yuelong
- 104, 102 – Alan McManus
- 104, 101 – Tom Ford
- 104 – Michael White
- 103 – Eden Sharav
- 102 – Louis Heathcote
- 101, 100 – Dominic Dale
