= Slessor =

Slessor is a surname. Notable people with the surname include:

- Catherine Slessor Scottish architecture writer
- Elliot Slessor (born 1994), English snooker player
- Frederick Slessor (1831–1905), British railway engineer
- John Slessor (1897–1975), Marshal of the Royal Air Force
- Kenneth Slessor (1901–1971), Australian poet
- Mary Slessor (1848–1915), Scottish missionary
- Tim Slessor (1931–2026), British filmmaker

== See also ==
- Slesser
