= Slesser =

Slesser is a surname. Notable people with the surname include:

- Henry Slesser (1883–1979), British barrister, politician, and judge
- Malcolm Slesser (1926–2007), Scottish energy analyst, scientist, and mountaineer
- Terry Slesser, English blues rock singer

== See also ==
- Slessor
- Slusser
