= Mateusz Baranowski =

Polish snooker player

Personal information
- Nickname: The Baron
- Born: 19 July 1997 (age 29)

Sport
- Country: Poland
- Sport: Snooker
- Professional: 2025–present
- Highest ranking: 83 (26 October 2026)
- Current ranking: 84 (as of 7 November 2026)
- Best ranking finish: Last 16 (2026 Northern Ireland Open)

Mateusz Baranowski (born 19 July 1997) is a Polish professional snooker player. He earned a two-year card on the World Snooker Tour from the 2025-26 snooker season.

== Career ==
He is from Zielona Góra. He is a multiple-time Polish national champion having won the title in 2017, 2018, 2022 and 2025, and also reached the semi-finals in 2015, 2020, and 2023.

He reached the final of the WSF Championship on 31 January 2025, where he was defeated by Brian Cini of Malta. For this performance, he was awarded a place in the qualifying rounds for the 2025 World Snooker Championship. In the first round, he recorded a 10-2 win over Iranian professional Amir Sarkhosh. He was then beaten 10-2 in the next round against Ishpreet Singh Chadha.

He competed at Q School in May 2025, where he reached the final round with a 4-3 win over Phil O'Kane before facing Patrick Whelan. He won 4-2 against Whelan and earned a two-year card on the World Snooker Tour, starting from the 2025-26 snooker season.

=== 2025-26 season ===
He made his professional debut in June 2025 in the qualifying round for the Wuhan Open with a 5-2 defeat to experienced pro Tom Ford. He was drawn in the round-robin stage of the 2025 Championship League against Lei Peifan, Long Zehuang and English amateur Ryan Davies, recording a win over Davies. He defeated Wang Yuchen 4-3 in the first qualifying round of the 2025 Northern Ireland Open, recovering from 3-0 down. He reached the last-32 of the 2025 Xi'an Grand Prix, where he lost a deciding frame to Gary Wilson. In April, he recorded a 10-5 win over Florian Nüßle in the first round of qualifying for the 2026 World Snooker Championship, before losing to Ricky Walden.

=== 2026-27 season ===
In September 2026, he defeated Ricky Walden to reach the main draw at the 2026 Scottish Open. The following month, Baranowski reached the last-16 of a ranking event for the first time in his career by beating Wang Xinbo at the 2026 Northern Ireland Open.

== Personal life ==
He formerly worked as a barman in his local snooker hall. He has coached the Polish Junior Snooker Team, which included a 14-year-old Michał Szubarczyk.

== Performance and rankings timeline ==
Tournament	2011/ 12	2013/ 14	2014/ 15	2015/ 16	2016/ 17	2017/ 18	2018/ 19	2024/ 25	2025/ 26	2026/ 27
Ranking (Note: It shows the ranking at the beginning of the season)	(Note: He was an amateur)								(Note: New players on the Main Tour don't have a ranking)	85
Ranking tournaments
Championship League	Non-Ranking Event							A	RR	RR
China Open	A	A	A	A	A	A	A	Not Held		LQ
Wuhan Open	Tournament Not Held							A	LQ	LQ
British Open	Tournament Not Held							A	LQ	LQ
English Open	Tournament Not Held				A	A	A	A	LQ	1R
Shenzhen Open (Note: The event was called the Xi'an Grand Prix (2024/2025–2025/2026))	Tournament Not Held							A	2R	LQ
Northern Ireland Open	Tournament Not Held				A	A	A	A	LQ	3R
International Championship	NH	A	A	A	A	A	A	A	LQ	LQ
UK Championship	A	A	A	A	A	A	A	A	LQ	LQ
Shoot Out	Non-Ranking			A	A	A	A	A	1R	
Scottish Open	Tournament Not Held				A	A	A	A	LQ	
German Masters	A	A	A	A	A	A	A	A	LQ	LQ
Welsh Open	A	A	A	A	A	A	A	A	LQ	
World Grand Prix	Not Held		NR	DNQ	DNQ	DNQ	DNQ	DNQ	DNQ	
Players Championship (Note: The event was called the Players Tour Championship Grand Final (2011/2012, 2013/2014–2015/2016))	DNQ	DNQ	DNQ	DNQ	DNQ	DNQ	DNQ	DNQ	DNQ	
World Open	A	A	Not Held		A	A	A	A	LQ	
Tour Championship	Tournament Not Held						DNQ	DNQ	DNQ	
World Championship	A	A	A	LQ	A	A	A	LQ	LQ	
Former ranking tournaments
Paul Hunter Classic	Minor-Ranking Event					LQ	LQ	Not Held		
Saudi Arabia Masters	Tournament Not Held							A	1R	NH
Former non-ranking tournaments
Six-red World Championship	NH	A	A	A	RR	A	A	Not Held		

Performance Table Legend
LQ	lost in the qualifying draw	#R	lost in the early rounds of the tournament (WR = Wildcard round, RR = Round robin)	QF	lost in the quarter-finals
SF	lost in the semi-finals	F	lost in the final	W	won the tournament
DNQ	did not qualify for the tournament	A	did not participate in the tournament	WD	withdrew from the tournament

NH / Not Held	means an event was not held.
NR / Non-Ranking Event	means an event is/was no longer a ranking event.
R / Ranking Event	means an event is/was a ranking event.
MR / Minor-Ranking Event	means an event is/was a minor-ranking event.

== Career finals ==
=== Pro-am finals: 1 ===
Outcome	No.	Year	Championship	Opponent in the final	Score
Runner-up	1.	2019	Independence Day Cup	(England) Craig Steadman	0–4

=== Amateur finals: 9 (5 titles) ===
Outcome	No.	Year	Championship	Opponent in the final	Score
Runner-up	1.	2015	Polish Amateur Championship	(Poland) Adam Stefanow	2–7
Winner	1.	2016	EBSA European 6-Reds Championship	(Germany) Lukas Kleckers	4–3
Winner	2.	2017	Polish Amateur Championship	(Poland) Kacper Filipiak	6–5
Winner	3.	2018	Polish Amateur Championship (2)	(Poland) Kacper Filipiak	6–4
Runner-up	2.	2020	Polish Amateur Championship (2)	(Poland) Antoni Kowalski	4–6
Winner	4.	2022	Polish Amateur Championship (3)	(Poland) Konrad Juszczyszyn	5–1
Runner-up	3.	2023	Polish Amateur Championship (3)	(Poland) Antoni Kowalski	2–5
Runner-up	4.	2024	Polish Amateur Championship (4)	(Poland) Antoni Kowalski	1–5
Winner	5.	2025	Polish Amateur Championship (4)	(Poland) Daniel Holoyda	5–2

=== Team finals: 3 (2 titles) ===
Outcome	No.	Year	Championship	Team/Partner	Opponent(s) in the final	Score
Runner-up	1.	2019	European Team Snooker Championships	Poland 1 Tomasz Skalski	Malta; Duncan Bezzina; Tony Drago	2–4
Winner	1.	2022	European Team Snooker Championships	Poland 1 Antoni Kowalski	Belgium 1 Julien Leclercq; Kevin Hanssens	5–3
Winner	2.	2023	European Team Snooker Championships (2)	Poland 1 Antoni Kowalski	Israel; Shachar Ruberg; Eden Sharav	5–4
