= Antoni Kowalski =

Polish snooker player (born 2004)

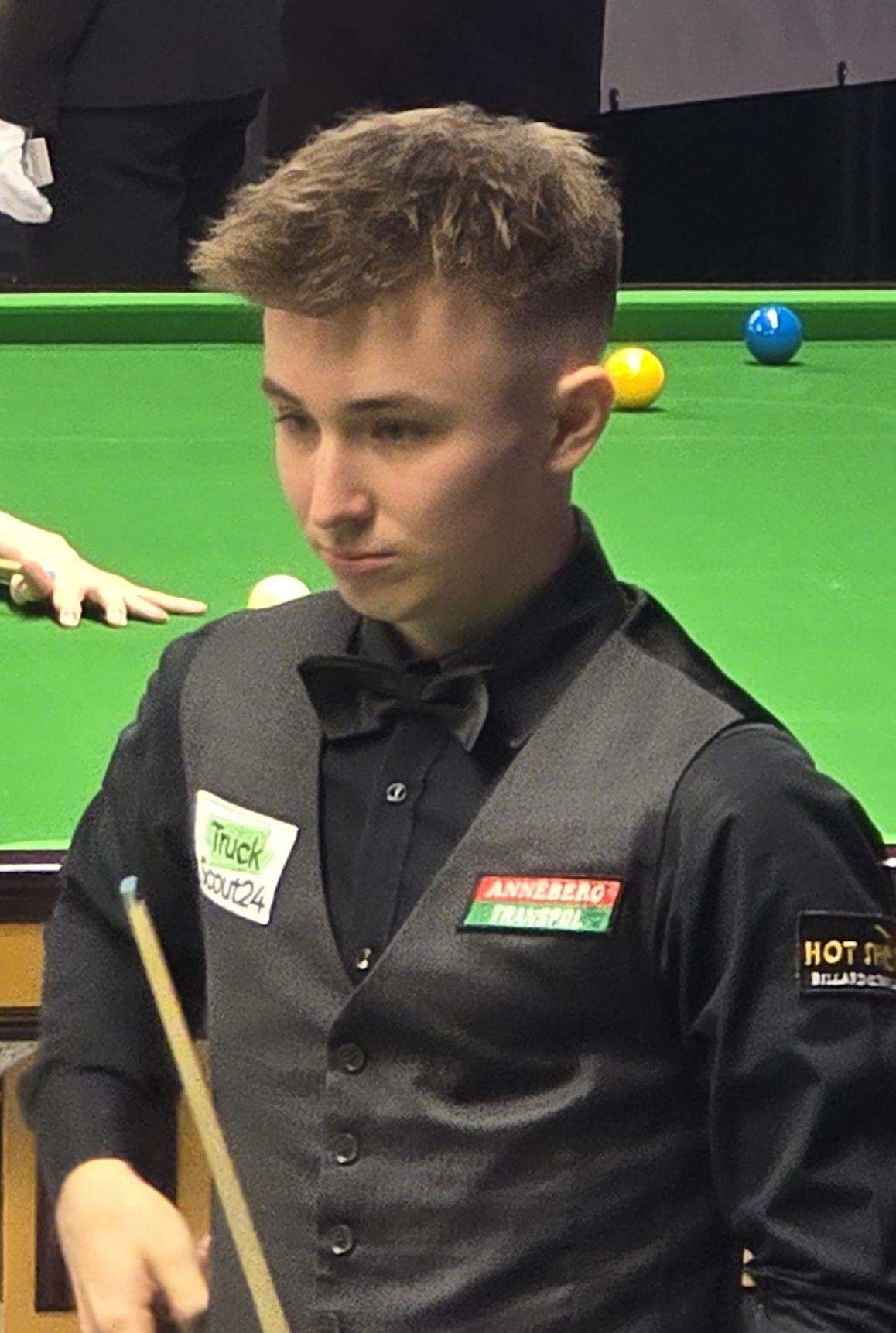

Personal information
- Nickname: The Flying Pole
- Born: 9 February 2004 (age 22) Zielona Góra, Poland

Sport
- Country: Poland
- Sport: Snooker
- Professional: 2024–present
- Highest ranking: 65 (May 2026)
- Current ranking: 105 (as of 7 November 2026)
- Best ranking finish: Last 16 (2024 Shoot Out)

Antoni Kowalski (born 9 February 2004) is a Polish professional snooker player. He has earned a two-year card on the World Snooker Tour from the 2024–25 snooker season.

He is the first Polish player to qualify for the main draw of the World Snooker Championship at the Crucible.

== Early life ==
Kowalski is from Zielona Góra in Poland.

== Career ==
In 2019, he won the World Open Under-16 Snooker Championships, defeating Hungarian Bulcsú Révész 4–2 in the final. He became the first Polish player to win the title.

In 2022, Kowalski was runner up to Liam Davies in the Under-18 and Under-21 categories at the IBSF World Snooker Championship.

In January 2023, Kowalski defeated Mateusz Baranowski 5–2 in the final of the Polish Championship in Lublin. It was his second Polish national championship, having also won the title in 2021.

=== 2023-24 season ===
In November 2023, Kowalski secured the biggest title of his career as he defeated Rory McLeod 5–3 in the final to win the Landywood Q Tour title.

In January 2024, he defeated Baranowski in the final of the Polish national championship again, for his third national title. In March 2024, he reached the final of the EBSA European Under-21 Snooker Championships where he lost to Liam Davies.

=== 2024-25 season ===
He entered Q School in May 2024 and in the second event he progressed to the latter stages with wins over Jed Mann, and former professional James Cahill. In the final round he faced Englishman Simon Blackwell and triumphed 4–1 to earn an assured two-year card on the World Snooker Tour.

He began his pro career at the 2024 Championship League in Leicester in June 2024 with his results including a 2–2 draw with World Championship finalist Jak Jones in his round robin group. He reached the third round of the 2024 Saudi Arabia Snooker Masters with a 4–0 win over He Guoqiang. He defeated Hammad Miah at the 2024 Northern Ireland Open in September 2024. In December 2024, he reached the last-16 of the 2024 Snooker Shoot Out. That month, he reached the last-64 of the 2025 German Masters with a 5–0 win over Martin O'Donnell, and the last-64 of the 2025 World Open.

=== 2025-26 season ===
He was drawn in the round-robin stage of the 2025 Championship League against Stuart Bingham, Hatem Yassin and Halim Hussain, finishing second in the group behind Bingham with two wins. In April 2026, he moved into the third round of qualifying for the 2026 World Snooker Championship with a 10-1 win over Connor Benzey before defeating Joe O'Connor 10-8 to set-up a final round match against Jamie Jones. He won the match against Jones 10-8 which assured he retained his place on the World Snooker Tour; a defeat would have resulted in relegation. With the win he also became the first Polish player to qualify for The Crucible setting up a first round match against Mark Williams, which he lost 10-4.

== Performance and rankings timeline ==
Tournament	2013/ 14	2014/ 15	2015/ 16	2017/ 18	2018/ 19	2019/ 20	2020/ 21	2024/ 25	2025/ 26	2026/ 27
Ranking (Note: It shows the ranking at the beginning of the season)	(Note: He was an amateur)							(Note: New players on the Main Tour don't have a ranking)	71	(Note: Players qualified One Year Ranking List started the season without ranking points)
Ranking tournaments
Championship League	Non-Ranking Event						A	RR	RR	RR
China Open	A	A	A	A	A	Tournament Not Held				LQ
Wuhan Open	Tournament Not Held							LQ	LQ	LQ
British Open	Tournament Not Held							1R	2R	LQ
English Open	Not Held			A	A	A	A	LQ	LQ	1R
Shenzhen Open (Note: The event was called the Xi'an Grand Prix (2024/2025–2025/2026))	Tournament Not Held							LQ	LQ	LQ
Northern Ireland Open	Not Held			A	A	A	A	LQ	LQ	LQ
International Championship	A	A	A	A	A	A	NH	LQ	LQ	LQ
UK Championship	A	A	A	A	A	A	A	LQ	LQ	LQ
Shoot Out	Non-Ranking Event			A	A	A	A	4R	1R	
Scottish Open	Not Held			A	A	A	A	1R	1R	LQ
German Masters	A	A	A	A	A	A	A	1R	LQ	LQ
Welsh Open	A	A	A	A	A	A	A	LQ	1R	
World Grand Prix	NH	NR	DNQ	DNQ	DNQ	DNQ	DNQ	DNQ	DNQ	
Players Championship (Note: The event was called the Players Tour Championship Grand Final (2013/2014–2015/2016))	DNQ	DNQ	DNQ	DNQ	DNQ	DNQ	DNQ	DNQ	DNQ	
World Open	A	Not Held		A	A	A	NH	2R	1R	
Tour Championship	Tournament Not Held				DNQ	DNQ	DNQ	DNQ	DNQ	
World Championship	A	A	A	A	A	LQ	A	LQ	1R	
Non-ranking tournaments
Championship League	A	A	A	A	A	A	A	A	RR	
Former ranking tournaments
Paul Hunter Classic	Minor-Ranking			LQ	LQ	NR	Tournament Not Held			
European Masters	Not Held			A	A	A	2R	Not Held		
Saudi Arabia Masters	Tournament Not Held							3R	3R	NH

Performance Table Legend
LQ	lost in the qualifying draw	#R	lost in the early rounds of the tournament (WR = Wildcard round, RR = Round robin)	QF	lost in the quarter-finals
SF	lost in the semi-finals	F	lost in the final	W	won the tournament
DNQ	did not qualify for the tournament	A	did not participate in the tournament	WD	withdrew from the tournament

NH / Not Held	means an event was not held.
NR / Non-Ranking Event	means an event is/was no longer a ranking event.
R / Ranking Event	means an event is/was a ranking event.
MR / Minor-Ranking Event	means an event is/was a minor-ranking event.

== Career finals ==
=== Pro-am finals: 1 ===
Outcome	No.	Year	Championship	Opponent in the final	Score
Runner-up	1.	2024	Belgian Open	(England) Joe O'Connor	2–4

=== Amateur finals: 8 (5 titles) ===
Outcome	No.	Year	Championship	Opponent in the final	Score
Winner	1.	2019	World Open Under-16 Snooker Championships	(Hungary) Bulcsú Révész	4–2
Winner	2.	2020	Polish Amateur Championship	(Poland) Mateusz Baranowski	6–4
Runner-up	1.	2022	IBSF World Under-18 Snooker Championship	(Wales) Liam Davies	3–4
Runner-up	2.	2022	IBSF World Under-21 Snooker Championship	(Wales) Liam Davies	1–5
Winner	3.	2023	Polish Amateur Championship (2)	(Poland) Mateusz Baranowski	5–2
Winner	4.	2023	Q Tour – Event 4	(Jamaica) Rory McLeod	5–3
Winner	5.	2024	Polish Amateur Championship (3)	(Poland) Mateusz Baranowski	5–1
Runner-up	3.	2024	EBSA European Under-21 Snooker Championships	(Wales) Liam Davies	3–5

=== Team finals: 2 (2 titles) ===
Outcome	No.	Year	Championship	Team/Partner	Opponent(s) in the final	Score
Winner	1.	2022	European Team Snooker Championships	Poland 1 Mateusz Baranowski	Belgium 1 Julien Leclercq; Kevin Hanssens	5–3
Winner	2.	2023	European Team Snooker Championships (2)	Poland 1 Mateusz Baranowski	Israel; Shachar Ruberg; Eden Sharav	5–4
