= 2017 Welsh Open (snooker) =

2017 Coral Welsh Open

Tournament information
- Dates: 13–19 February 2017
- Venue: Motorpoint Arena
- City: Cardiff
- Country: Wales
- Organisation: World Snooker
- Format: Ranking event
- Total prize fund: £366,000
- Winner's share: £70,000
- Highest break: Mark Davis (ENG) (144)

Final
- Champion: Stuart Bingham (ENG)
- Runner-up: Judd Trump (ENG)
- Score: 9–8

The 2017 Welsh Open (officially the 2017 Coral Welsh Open) was a professional snooker tournament that took place from 13 to 19 February 2017 at the Motorpoint Arena in Cardiff. It was the fourteenth ranking event of the 2016/2017 season.

The 2017 Welsh Open was held as part of a new Home Nations Series, introduced in the 2016/2017 season with the new English Open, Northern Ireland Open and Scottish Open tournaments. The tournament's trophy was renamed to the Ray Reardon Trophy in honour of six-time world champion Ray Reardon.

The defending champion Ronnie O'Sullivan lost 3–4 against Mark Davis in the last 64.

Stuart Bingham won his first Welsh Open title and fourth ranking title overall, beating Judd Trump 9–8 in the final.

== Prize fund ==
The breakdown of prize money is shown below.

- Winner: £70,000
- Runner-up: £30,000
- Semi-finals: £20,000
- Quarter-finals: £10,000
- Last 16: £6,000
- Last 32: £3,500
- Last 64: £2,500
- Highest break: £2,000
- Total: £366,000

The "rolling 147 prize" for a maximum break stood at £10,000.

== Main draw ==
=== Top half ===
==== Section 1 ====
Last 128; Best of 7 frames
(England) Ronnie O'Sullivan (1)	4
(England) Tom Ford	1
(China) Li Hang	2
(England) Mark Davis	4
(Republic of Ireland) Fergal O'Brien	4
(China) Cao Yupeng	1
(Thailand) Sunny Akani	2
(England) Chris Wakelin	4
(Wales) Mark Williams (16)	3
(England) Elliot Slessor	4
(England) Jimmy Robertson	4
(India) Aditya Mehta	3
(Wales) David John	2
(England) Mark King	4
(Scotland) Scott Donaldson	4
(England) Jack Lisowski	1

Last 64; Best of 7 frames
(England) Ronnie O'Sullivan (1)	3
(England) Mark Davis	4
(Republic of Ireland) Fergal O'Brien	4
(England) Chris Wakelin	2
(England) Elliot Slessor	2
(England) Jimmy Robertson	4
(England) Mark King	2
(Scotland) Scott Donaldson	4

Last 32; Best of 7 frames
(England) Mark Davis	4
(Republic of Ireland) Fergal O'Brien	2
(England) Jimmy Robertson	0
(Scotland) Scott Donaldson	4

Last 16; Best of 7 frames
(England) Mark Davis	3
(Scotland) Scott Donaldson	4

==== Section 2 ====
Last 128; Best of 7 frames
(China) Zhou Yuelong	4
(Thailand) Noppon Saengkham	0
(England) Paul Davison	4
(Northern Ireland) Joe Swail	0
(England) Mark Joyce	3
(Scotland) Ross Muir	4
(Hong Kong) Marco Fu (9)	4
(England) Martin Gould	2
(England) Ricky Walden	3
(Scotland) Graeme Dott	4
(England) Michael Wild	3
(Poland) Adam Stefanow	4
(Scotland) Rhys Clark	2
(Wales) Lee Walker	4
(Australia) Neil Robertson (8)	4
(England) Jimmy White	1

Last 64; Best of 7 frames
(China) Zhou Yuelong	4
(England) Paul Davison	1
(Scotland) Ross Muir	4
(Hong Kong) Marco Fu (9)	0
(Scotland) Graeme Dott	4
(Poland) Adam Stefanow	1
(Wales) Lee Walker	4
(Australia) Neil Robertson (8)	3

Last 32; Best of 7 frames
(China) Zhou Yuelong	4
(Scotland) Ross Muir	1
(Scotland) Graeme Dott	2
(Wales) Lee Walker	4

Last 16; Best of 7 frames
(China) Zhou Yuelong	4
(Wales) Lee Walker	0

==== Section 3 ====
Last 128; Best of 7 frames
(England) Judd Trump (5)	4
(England) Andrew Higginson	1
(Egypt) Hatem Yassen	1
(Malta) Alex Borg	4
(Wales) Jackson Page	4
(England) Jason Weston	3
(England) John Astley	4
(Wales) Ian Preece	1
(England) Ali Carter (12)	4
(China) Zhao Xintong	2
(Thailand) Dechawat Poomjaeng	1
(Isle of Man) Darryl Hill	4
(Iran) Hossein Vafaei	4
(England) Sanderson Lam	3
(Scotland) Alan McManus	2
(England) Christopher Keogan	4

Last 64; Best of 7 frames
(England) Judd Trump (5)	4
(Malta) Alex Borg	2
(Wales) Jackson Page	4
(England) John Astley	3
(England) Ali Carter (12)	4
(Isle of Man) Darryl Hill	1
(Iran) Hossein Vafaei	4
(England) Christopher Keogan	2

Last 32; Best of 7 frames
(England) Judd Trump (5)	4
(Wales) Jackson Page	0
(England) Ali Carter (12)	1
(Iran) Hossein Vafaei	4

Last 16; Best of 7 frames
(England) Judd Trump (5)	4
(Iran) Hossein Vafaei	1

==== Section 4 ====
Last 128; Best of 7 frames
(Thailand) Thepchaiya Un-Nooh	4
(England) Ben Woollaston	0
(England) David Gilbert	3
(Wales) Ryan Day	4
(China) Tian Pengfei	4
(China) Chen Zhe	2
(England) Barry Hawkins (13)	4
(Scotland) Fraser Patrick	1
(England) Jamie Cope	4
(England) Nigel Bond	0
(Belgium) Luca Brecel	2
(England) Anthony Hamilton	4
(Wales) Jak Jones	2
(England) Craig Steadman	4
(Scotland) John Higgins (4)	2
(England) Sam Baird	4

Last 64; Best of 7 frames
(Thailand) Thepchaiya Un-Nooh	4
(Wales) Ryan Day	1
(China) Tian Pengfei	0
(England) Barry Hawkins (13)	4
(England) Jamie Cope	1
(England) Anthony Hamilton	4
(England) Craig Steadman	4
(England) Sam Baird	1

Last 32; Best of 7 frames
(Thailand) Thepchaiya Un-Nooh	1
(England) Barry Hawkins (13)	4
(England) Anthony Hamilton	2
(England) Craig Steadman	4

Last 16; Best of 7 frames
(England) Barry Hawkins (13)	4
(England) Craig Steadman	0

=== Bottom half ===
==== Section 5 ====
Last 128; Best of 7 frames
(England) Stuart Bingham (3)	4
(Wales) Matthew Stevens	2
(England) Gary Wilson	3
(England) Rory McLeod	4
(Scotland) Stephen Maguire	4
(China) Zhang Yong	2
(England) Ian Burns	4
(England) James Cahill	3
(China) Liang Wenbo (14)	4
(England) Rod Lawler	2
(Wales) Duane Jones	1
(Wales) Michael White	4
(England) Andy Hicks	4
(England) Martin O'Donnell	2
(England) David Grace	2
(England) Robbie Williams	4

Last 64; Best of 7 frames
(England) Stuart Bingham (3)	4
(England) Rory McLeod	2
(Scotland) Stephen Maguire	3
(England) Ian Burns	4
(China) Liang Wenbo (14)	3
(Wales) Michael White	4
(England) Andy Hicks	3
(England) Robbie Williams	4

Last 32; Best of 7 frames
(England) Stuart Bingham (3)	4
(England) Ian Burns	0
(Wales) Michael White	2
(England) Robbie Williams	4

Last 16; Best of 7 frames
(England) Stuart Bingham (3)	4
(England) Robbie Williams	0

==== Section 6 ====
Last 128; Best of 7 frames
(Wales) Tyler Rees	1
(Wales) Jamie Jones	4
(Wales) Dominic Dale	4
(China) Zhang Anda	0
(England) Alfie Burden	0
(Brazil) Igor Figueiredo	4
(England) Joe Perry (11)	3
(Scotland) Anthony McGill	4
(England) Stuart Carrington	4
(England) Sam Craigie	2
(Wales) Gareth Allen	3
(China) Wang Yuchen	4
(Cyprus) Michael Georgiou	1
(England) Allan Taylor	4
(China) Ding Junhui (6)	2
(Finland) Robin Hull	4

Last 64; Best of 7 frames
(Wales) Jamie Jones	2
(Wales) Dominic Dale	4
(Brazil) Igor Figueiredo	4
(Scotland) Anthony McGill	2
(England) Stuart Carrington	4
(China) Wang Yuchen	2
(England) Allan Taylor	1
(Finland) Robin Hull	4

Last 32; Best of 7 frames
(Wales) Dominic Dale	1
(Brazil) Igor Figueiredo	4
(England) Stuart Carrington	4
(Finland) Robin Hull	0

Last 16; Best of 7 frames
(Brazil) Igor Figueiredo	1
(England) Stuart Carrington	4

==== Section 7 ====
Last 128; Best of 7 frames
(England) Shaun Murphy (7)	4
(England) Jamie Curtis-Barrett	0
(England) Hammad Miah	1
(Republic of Ireland) Josh Boileau	4
(China) Yu Delu	0
(England) Robert Milkins	4
(England) Oliver Lines	1
(Scotland) Eden Sharav	4
(Northern Ireland) Mark Allen (10)	4
(England) Sydney Wilson	0
(Thailand) Boonyarit Keattikun	4
(Republic of Ireland) Ken Doherty	1
(Pakistan) Hamza Akbar	2
(England) Peter Ebdon	4
(England) Matthew Selt	3
(China) Mei Xiwen	4

Last 64; Best of 7 frames
(England) Shaun Murphy (7)	2
(Republic of Ireland) Josh Boileau	4
(England) Robert Milkins	4
(Scotland) Eden Sharav	1
(Northern Ireland) Mark Allen (10)	4
(Thailand) Boonyarit Keattikun	1
(England) Peter Ebdon	0
(China) Mei Xiwen	4

Last 32; Best of 7 frames
(Republic of Ireland) Josh Boileau	0
(England) Robert Milkins	4
(Northern Ireland) Mark Allen (10)	2
(China) Mei Xiwen	4

Last 16; Best of 7 frames
(England) Robert Milkins	4
(China) Mei Xiwen	2

==== Section 8 ====
Last 128; Best of 7 frames
(China) Fang Xiongman	1
(Norway) Kurt Maflin	4
(Thailand) James Wattana	4
(China) Xiao Guodong	3
(England) Michael Holt	1
(England) Mitchell Mann	4
(England) Kyren Wilson (15)	2
(England) Sean O'Sullivan	4
(England) Adam Duffy	3
(Malaysia) Thor Chuan Leong	4
(China) Yan Bingtao	4
(Wales) Daniel Wells	1
(England) Mike Dunn	4
(Australia) Kurt Dunham	1
(England) Mark Selby (2)	4
(England) Liam Highfield	0

Last 64; Best of 7 frames
(Norway) Kurt Maflin	4
(Thailand) James Wattana	3
(England) Mitchell Mann	4
(England) Sean O'Sullivan	2
(Malaysia) Thor Chuan Leong	3
(China) Yan Bingtao	4
(England) Mike Dunn	2
(England) Mark Selby (2)	4

Last 32; Best of 7 frames
(Norway) Kurt Maflin	4
(England) Mitchell Mann	2
(China) Yan Bingtao	4
(England) Mark Selby (2)	1

Last 16; Best of 7 frames
(Norway) Kurt Maflin	4
(China) Yan Bingtao	1

=== Finals ===
Quarter-finals; Best of 9 frames
(Scotland) Scott Donaldson	5
(China) Zhou Yuelong	0
(England) Judd Trump (5)	5
(England) Barry Hawkins (13)	4
(England) Stuart Bingham (3)	5
(England) Stuart Carrington	3
(England) Robert Milkins	5
(Norway) Kurt Maflin	2

Semi-finals; Best of 11 frames
(Scotland) Scott Donaldson	3
(England) Judd Trump (5)	6
(England) Stuart Bingham (3)	6
(England) Robert Milkins	0

Final; Best of 17 frames
(England) Judd Trump (5)	8
(England) Stuart Bingham (3)	9

== Final ==
Final: Best of 17 frames. Referee: Colin Humphries. Motorpoint Arena, Cardiff, Wales, 19 February 2017.
Judd Trump (5); England	8–9	Stuart Bingham (3); England
Afternoon: 45–69 (69), 64–65 (64, 65), 1–74 (74), 21–61, 63–35, 130–0 (68, 58), 0–87 (87), 61–50; Evening: 91–1, 48–63 (63), 69–0, 74–36, 52–62, 66–31, 64–46, 57–71, 25–79 (55)
68	Highest break	87
0	Century breaks	0
3	50+ breaks	6

== Century breaks ==
Total: 55

- 144 – Mark Davis
- 143, 133, 111, 102 – Neil Robertson
- 142 – Fergal O'Brien
- 140, 131, 102 – Judd Trump
- 136, 123, 118, 103 – Hossein Vafaei
- 136 – Yan Bingtao
- 132, 113 – Anthony Hamilton
- 131 – Mei Xiwen
- 130 – Lee Walker
- 128, 101 – Stuart Carrington
- 128 – Michael White
- 127, 103, 101, 101 – Stuart Bingham
- 126 – Graeme Dott
- 120 – Mitchell Mann
- 118 – Andy Hicks
- 117 – Joe Perry
- 116, 113 – Kurt Maflin
- 115 – Robert Milkins
- 114 – Aditya Mehta
- 113, 101, 100 – Barry Hawkins
- 109, 101 – Anthony McGill
- 109 – Josh Boileau
- 108, 107, 101 – Jimmy Robertson
- 108 – Gareth Allen
- 106 – Sanderson Lam
- 105 – Robin Hull
- 105 – Igor Figueiredo
- 105 – Craig Steadman
- 104 – Ricky Walden
- 102 – Jimmy White
- 101 – Ronnie O'Sullivan
- 101 – Allan Taylor
- 101 – Zhou Yuelong
- 100 – Ryan Day
- 100 – Stephen Maguire
- 100 – Robbie Williams
