= Christopher Keogan =

English snooker player

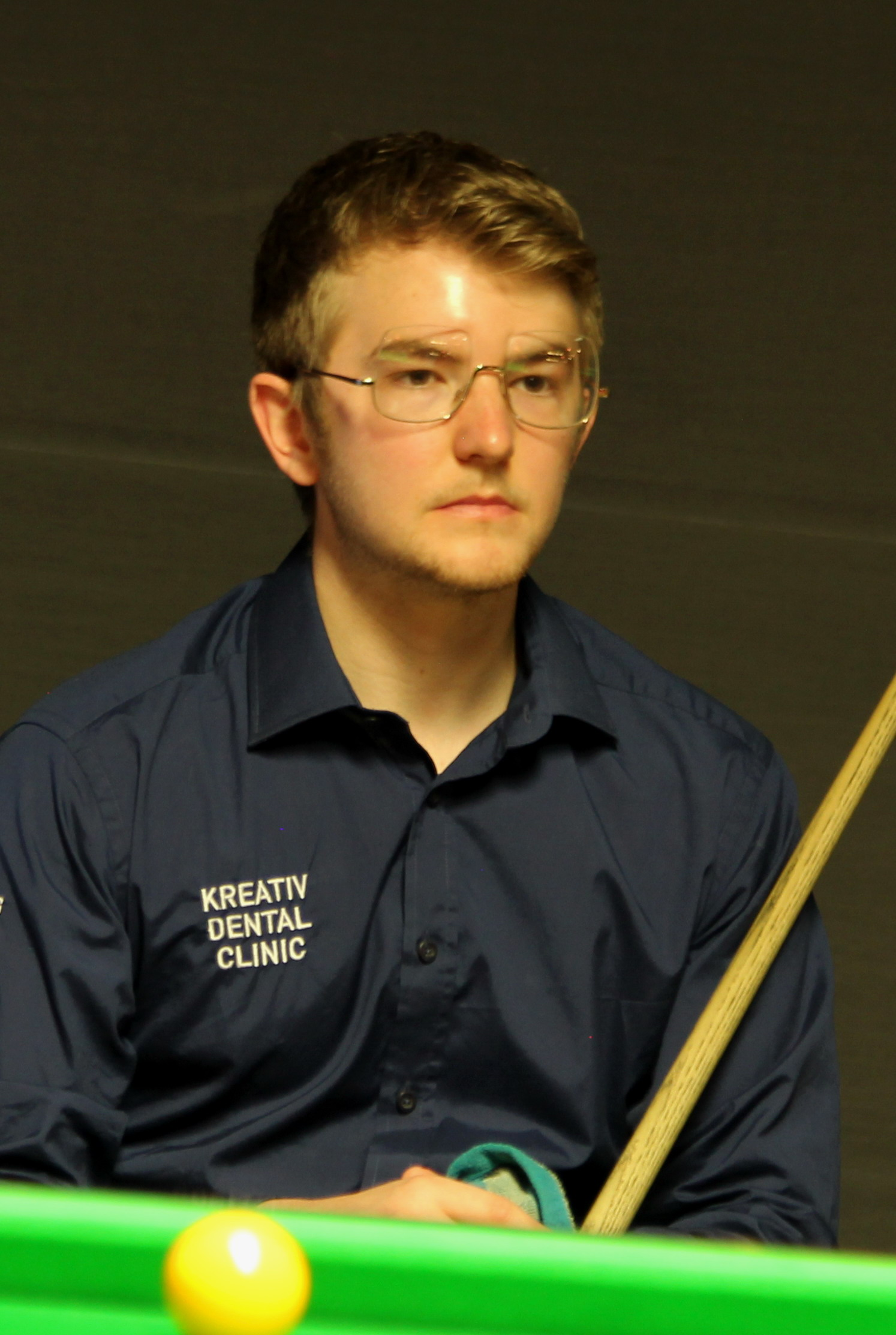
- Keogan in 2015

Personal information
- Born: 26 August 1992 (age 34) Doncaster, Yorkshire, England

Sport
- Country: England
- Sport: Snooker
- Professional: 2016–2018
- Highest ranking: 91 (June 2017)
- Best ranking finish: Last 16 (x1)

Christopher Keogan (born 26 August 1992) is an English former professional snooker player.

== Career ==
From the town of Doncaster, Yorkshire in England, Keogan started playing snooker at the age of 6. In his early years he was coached by Steve Prest and at age 13 was widely considered one of the most promising upcoming snooker talents, with then world champion Shaun Murphy tipping Keogan as a future world champion himself. At the first event of the 2016 Q School, Keogan defeated highly rated youngsters Jamie Clarke and Adam Stefanow as well as former professionals Lü Chenwei and Joel Walker before he reached the final round against Marc Davis whom he defeated 4–0, a win which gave Keogan a two-year card to the World Snooker Tour for the 2016–17 season and 2017–18 seasons. He lost in the last 64 of four events during his first season as a professional. He dropped off the tour at the end of the 2017/18 season but entered the 2018 Q School in an attempt to win back a place.

== Personal life ==
Keogan is a keen football fan and is a supporter of Doncaster Rovers. Keogan is also an enthusiastic badminton player. His childhood idol was Paul Hunter. He has three older siblings one brother and two sisters.

== Performance and rankings timeline ==
Tournament	2013/ 14	2015/ 16	2016/ 17	2017/ 18	2019/ 20
Ranking (Note: It shows the ranking at the beginning of the season.)	(Note: He was an amateur.)		(Note: New players on the Main Tour don't have a ranking.)	90	
Ranking tournaments
Riga Masters	NH	MR	1R	1R	3R
International Championship	LQ	A	LQ	LQ	A
China Championship	Not Held		NR	LQ	A
English Open	Not Held		1R	1R	A
World Open	LQ	NH	LQ	LQ	A
Northern Ireland Open	Not Held		1R	1R	A
UK Championship	A	A	1R	1R	A
Scottish Open	Not Held		1R	2R	A
European Masters	Not Held		LQ	LQ	A
German Masters	LQ	A	LQ	LQ	A
World Grand Prix	NH	DNQ	DNQ	DNQ	DNQ
Welsh Open	A	A	2R	1R	A
Shoot-Out	NR		1R	1R	A
Players Championship	DNQ	DNQ	DNQ	DNQ	DNQ
Gibraltar Open	NH	MR	1R	1R	A
Tour Championship	Tournament Not Held				DNQ
World Championship	LQ	A	LQ	LQ	LQ
Former ranking tournaments
Wuxi Classic	LQ	Not Held			
Australian Goldfields Open	LQ	LQ	Not Held		
Shanghai Masters	A	A	LQ	LQ	NR
Paul Hunter Classic	MR		2R	1R	NH
Indian Open	LQ	NH	LQ	LQ	NH
China Open	LQ	A	LQ	LQ	NH

Performance Table Legend
LQ	lost in the qualifying draw	#R	lost in the early rounds of the tournament (WR = Wildcard round, RR = Round robin)	QF	lost in the quarter-finals
SF	lost in the semi-finals	F	lost in the final	W	won the tournament
DNQ	did not qualify for the tournament	A	did not participate in the tournament	WD	withdrew from the tournament

NH / Not Held	means an event was not held.
NR / Non-Ranking Event	means an event is/was no longer a ranking event.
R / Ranking Event	means an event is/was a ranking event.
MR / Minor-Ranking Event	means an event is/was a minor-ranking event.
