= 2019 English Open (snooker) =

Snooker tournament

2019 19.com English Open
Tournament information
- Dates: 14–20 October 2019
- Venue: K2 Leisure Centre
- City: Crawley
- Country: England
- Organisation: World Snooker
- Format: Ranking event
- Total prize fund: £405,000
- Winner's share: £70,000
- Highest break: Tom Ford (ENG) (147)

Final
- Champion: Mark Selby (ENG)
- Runner-up: David Gilbert (ENG)
- Score: 9–1

The 2019 English Open (officially the 2019 19.com English Open) was a professional snooker tournament that took place from 14 to 20 October 2019 at the K2 Leisure Centre in Crawley, England. It was the fourth ranking event of the 2019–20 snooker season and the first of the 2019 Home Nations Series. The event was the fourth edition of the English Open, first held in 2016. Betting company 19.com sponsored the tournament.

The defending champion was Stuart Bingham, who defeated Mark Davis 9–7 in the 2018 final. Bingham lost 1–4 to Si Jiahui in the second round of the tournament. Mark Selby defeated David Gilbert 9–1 in the final to win his 16th ranking title.

A total of 71 century breaks were made during the tournament. Tom Ford made the highest break of the event, his fifth career maximum break, and the second 147 of the season, in the deciding frame of his 4–3 win over Shaun Murphy in the last 16.

== Format ==
The English Open was first played in 2016 as a world ranking tournament and a part of the Home Nations Series. The 2019 event was held in the K2 Leisure Centre, Crawley, England. The event was the fourth ranking tournament of the 2019–20 snooker season, and the first of four Home Nations Series events. The event followed the China Championship and preceded the World Open.

Stuart Bingham, who defeated Mark Davis 9–7 in the 2018 final was the defending champion. All matches were played as the best of 7 frames until the quarter-finals, at which point the number increased: 9 in the quarter-finals; 11 in the semi-finals; and the best of 19 frames in the final. Chinese sports prediction website 19.com sponsored the event, which was broadcast by Quest in the United Kingdom and the Republic of Ireland; in Europe by Eurosport; NowTV in Hong Kong; Superstars Online, Youku and Zhibo.tv in China; DAZN in Canada; Truesport in Thailand and Sky Sport in New Zealand.

=== Prize fund ===
The event's total prize fund was a total of £405,000, with the winner receiving £70,000. The breakdown of prize money for the tournament is shown below:

- Winner: £70,000
- Runner-up: £30,000
- Semi-final: £20,000
- Quarter-final: £10,000
- Last 16: £7,500
- Last 32: £4,000
- Last 64: £3,000
- Highest break: £5,000
- Total: £405,000

== Summary ==
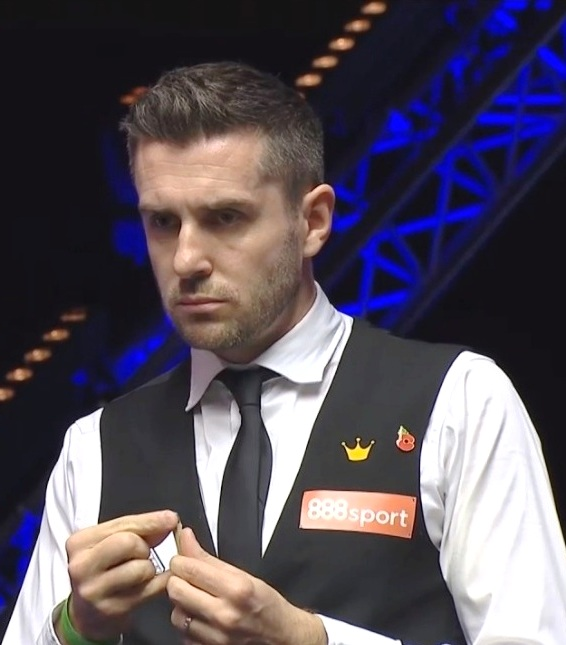
Mark Selby won the event with a 9–1 win over David Gilbert

Rounds one to four were played between 14 and 17 October as the best of seven frames. Tian Pengfei defeated Gerard Greene, Alan McManus and Dominic Dale to reach the last 16 round. He met Si Jiahui, who had defeated the defending champion Stuart Bingham in the second round 4–1. Tian completed a whitewash over Si Jiahui. Tom Ford, seeded 24, completed 4–0 wins over Peter Lines and Lu Ning before defeating Kyren Wilson 4–2. In the last 16, Ford played Shaun Murphy, and made a maximum break in the final frame to win the match 4–3. Twelfth seed David Gilbert defeated Stuart Carrington, amateur Ryan Davies, Kurt Maflin to meet Zhao Xintong in the last 16, which he won 4–3. Ricky Walden received a bye in his second round match against Sam Craigie, after Craigie failed to arrive before defeating Michael Holt 4–3 to reach the last 16. There he met Thepchaiya Un-Nooh and won 4–2.

Chinese player Mei Xiwen defeated Yan Bingtao, Li Hang and Elliot Slessor. He met five-time World Snooker Championship winner Ronnie O'Sullivan, defeating him 4–3. Mark Selby, ranked sixth defeated Barry Pinches, Martin O'Donnell and Matthew Selt before defeating Xiao Guodong 4–1 to reach the quarter-finals. Mark Allen completed two whitewashes over Andy Lee and tenth seed Barry Hawkins to progress to the quarter-finals. World number 80 Lee Walker defeated Chen Zifan and Robbie Williams to play world number one Judd Trump in the last 32. Trump did not pot a ball in the opening two frames as Walker won the match 4–2, and defeated Gary Wilson to reach the quarter-finals.

The quarter-finals were played on 18 October as the best of 9 frames. Ford completed a 5-0 whitewash over Tian. Allen defeated Walker, who won only frame 5. Selby defeated Mei, who had led by three frames. The match between Gilbert and Walden went to a deciding frame as Gilbert won 5–4. The semi-finals were played as the best of 11 frames on 19 October. The first was held as Gilbert defeated Ford 6–3. Allen and Selby faced off in the second semi-final, as Selby led 3–1 but later trailed 3–5. Selby took the last three frames to win the match 6–5.

The final was played on 20 October between Selby and Gilbert, as the best of 17 frames held over two sessions. Selby won the first five frames with breaks of 88, 68, 79 and 85 before Gilbert won frame six with a century break. Selby made a break of 130 in frame seven, before a 97 in the last frame of the session put him 7–1 up. Selby won both of the two frames in the second session, with a century break in frame 10 to win 9–1. After the win, Selby commented, "It's been a long time since I won my last tournament .. I've been second guessing myself wondering if I am doing things right." He also commented that Gilbert would win a ranking event soon. This was the 16th career ranking win for Selby.

== Main draw ==
The results from the event are shown below. Seeded players have their seedings in brackets. Players highlighted in bold denote match winners.

=== Top half ===
==== Section 1 ====
Last 128; Best of 7 frames
**Stuart Bingham (ENG) (1)**	**4**
Kacper Filipiak (POL)	3
**Si Jiahui (CHN)**	**4**
Soheil Vahedi (IRN)	0
**Zhou Yuelong (CHN) (32)**	**4**
Michael White (WAL)	2
**Ben Woollaston (ENG)**	**4**
Andrew Higginson (ENG)	3
Ali Carter (ENG) (16)	2
**Alan McManus (SCO)**	**4**
Gerard Greene (NIR)	3
**Tian Pengfei (CHN)**	**4**
Ding Junhui (CHN) (17)	3
**Dominic Dale (WAL)**	**4**
Matthew Stevens (WAL)	2
**Xu Si (CHN)**	**4**

Last 64; Best of 7 frames
Stuart Bingham (ENG) (1)	1
**Si Jiahui (CHN)**	**4**
**Zhou Yuelong (CHN) (32)**	**4**
Ben Woollaston (ENG)	0
Alan McManus (SCO)	2
**Tian Pengfei (CHN)**	**4**
**Dominic Dale (WAL)**	**4**
Xu Si (CHN)	1

Last 32; Best of 7 frames
**Si Jiahui (CHN)**	**4**
Zhou Yuelong (CHN) (32)	0
**Tian Pengfei (CHN)**	**4**
Dominic Dale (WAL)	2

Last 16; Best of 7 frames
Si Jiahui (CHN)	0
**Tian Pengfei (CHN)**	**4**

==== Section 2 ====
Last 128; Best of 7 frames
Duane Jones (WAL)	3
**Lu Ning (CHN)**	**4**
**Tom Ford (ENG) (24)**	**4**
Peter Lines (ENG)	0
**Bai Langning (CHN)**	**4**
Jimmy White (ENG)	2
**Kyren Wilson (ENG) (9)**	**4**
Liang Wenbo (CHN)	1
**Fan Zhengyi (CHN)**	**4**
Riley Parsons (ENG)	3
Anthony McGill (SCO) (25)	2
**Chris Wakelin (ENG)**	**4**
Martin Gould (ENG)	3
**Sunny Akani (THA)**	**4**
**Shaun Murphy (ENG) (8)**	**4**
Chang Bingyu (CHN)	2

Last 64; Best of 7 frames
Lu Ning (CHN)	0
**Tom Ford (ENG) (24)**	**4**
Bai Langning (CHN)	3
**Kyren Wilson (ENG) (9)**	**4**
**Fan Zhengyi (CHN)**	**4**
Chris Wakelin (ENG)	3
Sunny Akani (THA)	1
**Shaun Murphy (ENG) (8)**	**4**

Last 32; Best of 7 frames
**Tom Ford (ENG) (24)**	**4**
Kyren Wilson (ENG) (9)	2
Fan Zhengyi (CHN)	0
**Shaun Murphy (ENG) (8)**	**4**

Last 16; Best of 7 frames
**Tom Ford (ENG) (24)**	**4**
Shaun Murphy (ENG) (8)	3

==== Section 3 ====
Last 128; Best of 7 frames
**Neil Robertson (AUS) (5)**	**4**
Kishan Hirani (WAL)	0
**Marco Fu (HKG)**	**4**
Ken Doherty (IRL)	0
Scott Donaldson (SCO) (28)	3
**Zhao Xintong (CHN)**	**4**
**Anthony Hamilton (ENG)**	**4**
Zhang Jiankang (CHN)	2
**David Gilbert (ENG) (12)**	**4**
Stuart Carrington (ENG)	1
**Ryan Davies (ENG)**	**4**
Lei Peifan (CHN)	2
**Jimmy Robertson (ENG) (21)**	**4**
Robert Milkins (ENG)	2
**Kurt Maflin (NOR)**	**4**
Noppon Saengkham (THA)	3

Last 64; Best of 7 frames
**Neil Robertson (AUS) (5)**	**4**
Marco Fu (HKG)	2
**Zhao Xintong (CHN)**	**4**
Anthony Hamilton (ENG)	0
**David Gilbert (ENG) (12)**	**4**
Ryan Davies (ENG)	0
Jimmy Robertson (ENG) (21)	3
**Kurt Maflin (NOR)**	**4**

Last 32; Best of 7 frames
Neil Robertson (AUS) (5)	0
**Zhao Xintong (CHN)**	**4**
**David Gilbert (ENG) (12)**	**4**
Kurt Maflin (NOR)	2

Last 16; Best of 7 frames
Zhao Xintong (CHN)	3
**David Gilbert (ENG) (12)**	**4**

==== Section 4 ====
Last 128; Best of 7 frames
Harvey Chandler (ENG)	2
**Mike Dunn (ENG)**	**4**
**Graeme Dott (SCO) (20)**	**4**
Mark Davis (ENG)	2
**Joe O'Connor (ENG)**	**4**
Ian Burns (ENG)	2
Stephen Maguire (SCO) (13)	0
**Thepchaiya Un-Nooh (THA)**	**4**
Luo Honghao (CHN)	2
**Sam Craigie (ENG)**	**4**
**Ricky Walden (ENG) (29)**	**4**
Alex Borg (MLT)	0
**Michael Holt (ENG)**	**4**
James Cahill (ENG)	1
**Mark Williams (WAL) (4)**	**4**
Jamie Clarke (WAL)	2

Last 64; Best of 7 frames
Mike Dunn (ENG)	0
**Graeme Dott (SCO) (20)**	**4**
Joe O'Connor (ENG)	3
**Thepchaiya Un-Nooh (THA)**	**4**
Sam Craigie (ENG)	w/d
Ricky Walden (ENG) (29)	**w/o**
**Michael Holt (ENG)**	**4**
Mark Williams (WAL) (4)	1

Last 32; Best of 7 frames
Graeme Dott (SCO) (20)	2
**Thepchaiya Un-Nooh (THA)**	**4**
**Ricky Walden (ENG) (29)**	**4**
Michael Holt (ENG)	3

Last 16; Best of 7 frames
Thepchaiya Un-Nooh (THA)	2
**Ricky Walden (ENG) (29)**	**4**

=== Bottom half ===
==== Section 5 ====
Last 128; Best of 7 frames
**Ronnie O'Sullivan (ENG) (3)**	**4**
Jamie O'Neill (ENG)	3
**Yuan Sijun (CHN)**	**4**
Igor Figueiredo (BRA)	0
**Hossein Vafaei (IRN) (30)**	**4**
Simon Lichtenberg (GER)	3
Thor Chuan Leong (MYS)	3
**Chen Feilong (CHN)**	**4**
Yan Bingtao (CHN) (14)	3
**Mei Xiwen (CHN)**	**4**
Li Hang (CHN)	**w/o**
Fraser Patrick (SCO)	w/d
**Ryan Day (WAL) (19)**	**4**
Eden Sharav (ISR)	0
Ashley Carty (ENG)	0
**Elliot Slessor (ENG)**	**4**

Last 64; Best of 7 frames
**Ronnie O'Sullivan (ENG) (3)**	**4**
Yuan Sijun (CHN)	3
**Hossein Vafaei (IRN) (30)**	**4**
Chen Feilong (CHN)	2
**Mei Xiwen (CHN)**	**4**
Li Hang (CHN)	0
Ryan Day (WAL) (19)	2
**Elliot Slessor (ENG)**	**4**

Last 32; Best of 7 frames
**Ronnie O'Sullivan (ENG) (3)**	**4**
Hossein Vafaei (IRN) (30)	1
**Mei Xiwen (CHN)**	**4**
Elliot Slessor (ENG)	1

Last 16; Best of 7 frames
Ronnie O'Sullivan (ENG) (3)	3
**Mei Xiwen (CHN)**	**4**

==== Section 6 ====
Last 128; Best of 7 frames
Jak Jones (WAL)	3
**Brandon Sargeant (ENG)**	**4**
**Xiao Guodong (CHN) (22)**	**4**
Rod Lawler (ENG)	2
**Alfie Burden (ENG)**	**4**
Andy Hicks (ENG)	3
**Jack Lisowski (ENG) (11)**	**4**
Jackson Page (WAL)	1
**Hammad Miah (ENG)**	**4**
Mitchell Mann (ENG)	2
**Matthew Selt (ENG) (27)**	**4**
Craig Steadman (ENG)	0
Alexander Ursenbacher (SUI)	2
**Martin O'Donnell (ENG)**	**4**
**Mark Selby (ENG) (6)**	**4**
Barry Pinches (ENG)	2

Last 64; Best of 7 frames
Brandon Sargeant (ENG)	0
**Xiao Guodong (CHN) (22)**	**4**
Alfie Burden (ENG)	3
**Jack Lisowski (ENG) (11)**	**4**
Hammad Miah (ENG)	1
**Matthew Selt (ENG) (27)**	**4**
Martin O'Donnell (ENG)	1
**Mark Selby (ENG) (6)**	**4**

Last 32; Best of 7 frames
**Xiao Guodong (CHN) (22)**	**4**
Jack Lisowski (ENG) (11)	3
Matthew Selt (ENG) (27)	2
**Mark Selby (ENG) (6)**	**4**

Last 16; Best of 7 frames
Xiao Guodong (CHN) (22)	1
**Mark Selby (ENG) (6)**	**4**

==== Section 7 ====
Last 128; Best of 7 frames
**Mark Allen (NIR) (7)**	**4**
James Wattana (THA)	2
**Andy Lee (HKG)**	**4**
David Lilley (ENG)	3
Luca Brecel (BEL) (26)	1
**Adam Stefanow (POL)**	**4**
Jordan Brown (NIR)	1
**Louis Heathcote (ENG)**	**4**
**Barry Hawkins (ENG) (10)**	**4**
Amine Amiri (MAR)	0
**Michael Georgiou (CYP)**	**4**
David Grace (ENG)	3
Lyu Haotian (CHN) (23)	1
**Zhang Anda (CHN)**	**4**
**Fergal O'Brien (IRL)**	**4**
Nigel Bond (ENG)	0

Last 64; Best of 7 frames
**Mark Allen (NIR) (7)**	**4**
Andy Lee (HKG)	0
Adam Stefanow (POL)	3
**Louis Heathcote (ENG)**	**4**
**Barry Hawkins (ENG) (10)**	**4**
Michael Georgiou (CYP)	0
Zhang Anda (CHN)	2
**Fergal O'Brien (IRL)**	**4**

Last 32; Best of 7 frames
**Mark Allen (NIR) (7)**	**4**
Louis Heathcote (ENG)	1
**Barry Hawkins (ENG) (10)**	**4**
Fergal O'Brien (IRL)	2

Last 16; Best of 7 frames
**Mark Allen (NIR) (7)**	**4**
Barry Hawkins (ENG) (10)	0

==== Section 8 ====
Last 128; Best of 7 frames
Billy Joe Castle (ENG)	2
**John Astley (ENG)**	**4**
**Gary Wilson (ENG) (18)**	**4**
Mark Joyce (ENG)	1
**Liam Highfield (ENG)**	**4**
Oliver Lines (ENG)	1
**Joe Perry (ENG) (15)**	**4**
Mark Lloyd (ENG)	1
**Lee Walker (WAL)**	**4**
Chen Zifan (CHN)	1
Mark King (ENG) (31)	0
**Robbie Williams (ENG)**	**4**
Sam Baird (ENG)	3
**Daniel Wells (WAL)**	**4**
**Judd Trump (ENG) (2)**	**4**
Peter Ebdon (ENG)	0

Last 64; Best of 7 frames
John Astley (ENG)	1
**Gary Wilson (ENG) (18)**	**4**
Liam Highfield (ENG)	2
**Joe Perry (ENG) (15)**	**4**
**Lee Walker (WAL)**	**4**
Robbie Williams (ENG)	3
Daniel Wells (WAL)	0
**Judd Trump (ENG) (2)**	**4**

Last 32; Best of 7 frames
**Gary Wilson (ENG) (18)**	**4**
Joe Perry (ENG) (15)	3
**Lee Walker (WAL)**	**4**
Judd Trump (ENG) (2)	2

Last 16; Best of 7 frames
Gary Wilson (ENG) (18)	3
**Lee Walker (WAL)**	**4**

=== Finals ===
**Quarter-finals**; Best of 9 frames
Tian Pengfei (CHN)	0
**Tom Ford (ENG) (24)**	**5**
**David Gilbert (ENG) (12)**	**5**
Ricky Walden (ENG) (29)	4
Mei Xiwen (CHN)	3
**Mark Selby (ENG) (6)**	**5**
**Mark Allen (NIR) (7)**	**5**
Lee Walker (WAL)	1

**Semi-finals**; Best of 11 frames
Tom Ford (ENG) (24)	3
**David Gilbert (ENG) (12)**	**6**
**Mark Selby (ENG) (6)**	**6**
Mark Allen (NIR) (7)	5

**Final**; Best of 17 frames
David Gilbert (ENG) (12)	1
**Mark Selby (ENG) (6)**	**9**

=== Final ===
Final: Best of 17 frames. Referee: Terry Camilleri. K2 Leisure Centre, Crawley, England, 20 October 2019.
David Gilbert (12); England	1–**9**	**Mark Selby** (6); England
Afternoon: 0–**88**, 5–**95**, 9–**92**, 0–**85**, 44–**77**, **101**–0 (101), 0–**130** (130), 0–**113**; Evening: 65–**68**, 4–**101** (101)
101	Highest break	**130**
1	Century breaks	**2**

== Century breaks ==
A total of 71 century breaks were made during the event. The highest was a maximum break made by Ford in the final frame of his 4–3 win over Murphy.

- 147, 128, 124, 102, 101 – Tom Ford
- 143 – Barry Hawkins
- 142 – Dominic Dale
- 142 – Mark Williams
- 141 – Gary Wilson
- 136, 134, 130, 127, 112, 101 – David Gilbert
- 136 – Fergal O'Brien
- 135, 108, 101 – Judd Trump
- 134, 102 – Ronnie O'Sullivan
- 134 – Jimmy Robertson
- 133 – Shaun Murphy
- 132, 130, 130, 103, 101 – Mark Selby
- 130 – Riley Parsons
- 129, 125, 100 – Mark Allen
- 128 – Joe Perry
- 128 – Xiao Guodong
- 127 – Joe O'Connor
- 126, 126 – Lee Walker
- 125, 124 – Ricky Walden
- 125, 121 – Yan Bingtao
- 124, 122, 122 – Tian Pengfei
- 122, 107 – Michael Holt
- 120 – Mike Dunn
- 120 – Luo Honghao
- 119 – Zhou Yuelong
- 118, 100 – Neil Robertson
- 118 – Sunny Akani
- 117, 104 – Thepchaiya Un-Nooh
- 115, 115, 101 – Kurt Maflin
- 114 – Jamie O'Neill
- 111, 103 – Stuart Bingham
- 108, 106 – Mei Xiwen
- 108 – Ryan Day
- 107 – Hammad Miah
- 106 – Anthony McGill
- 105 – Zhang Anda
- 104 – Yuan Sijun
- 103 – Adam Stefanow
- 103 – Matthew Stevens
- 102 – Andy Lee
- 100 – Kacper Filipiak
