= Slusser =

Slusser is an adapted Dutch occupational surname. Notable people with the surname include:

- George Edgar Slusser (1939–2014), American scholar, professor, and writer
- James Slusser (1916–1996), American police officer
- Jean Paul Slusser (1886–1981), American painter, designer, art critic, and professor
- Lewis Slusser (1820–1892), American politician and physician
- Mary Shepherd Slusser (1918–2017), American archaeologist
- Susan Slusser (born 1967), American sportswriter
