= Kacper Filipiak =

Polish professional snooker player (born 1995)

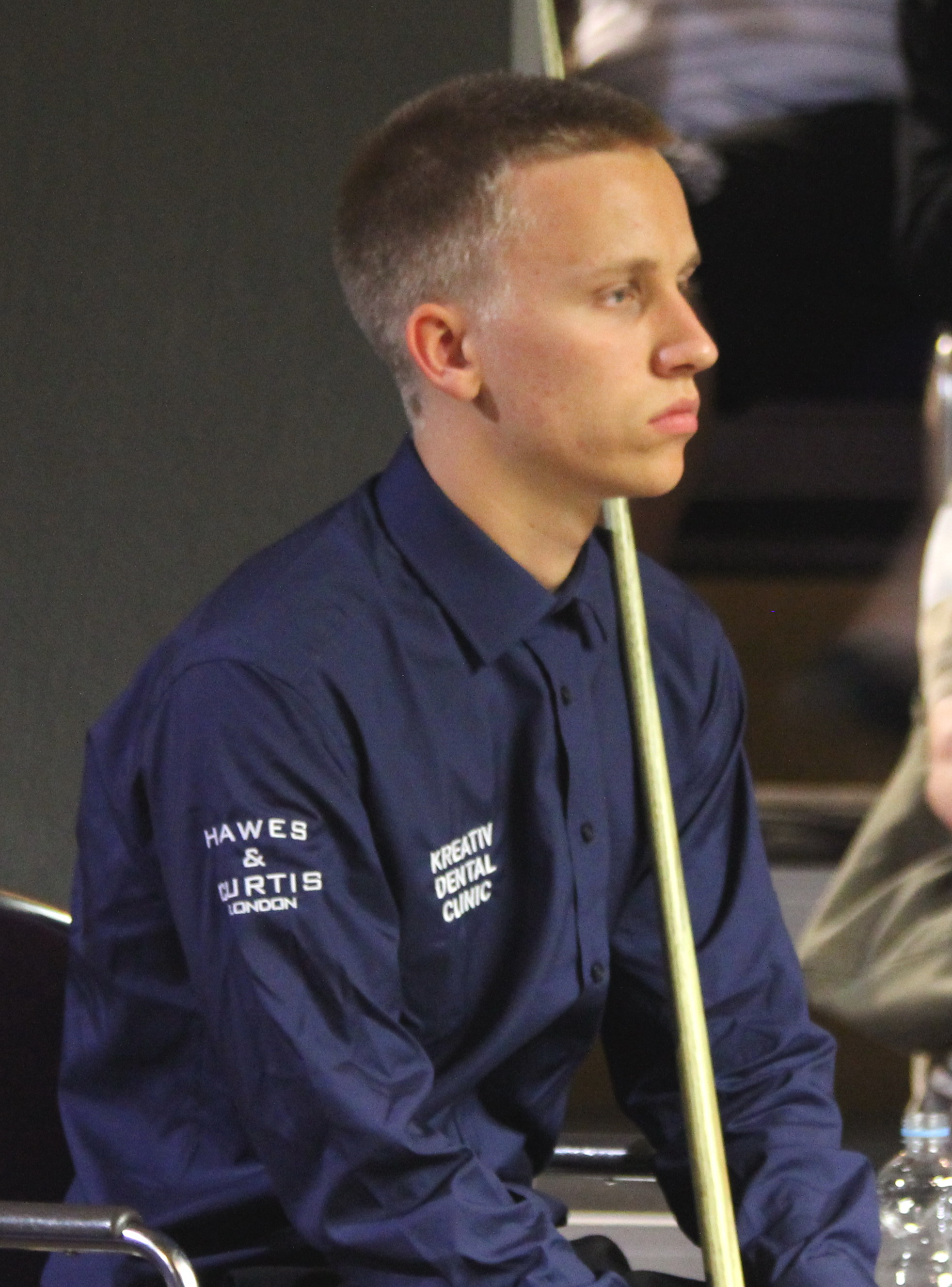
- Filipiak at the 2015 Paul Hunter Classic

Personal information
- Nickname: The Kid
- Born: 19 November 1995 (age 30) Warsaw, Masovian, Poland

Sport
- Country: Poland
- Sport: Snooker
- Professional: 2011/2012, 2019–2021
- Highest ranking: 76 (September 2020)
- Best ranking finish: Last 32 (x1)

Kacper Filipiak (born 19 November 1995) is a Polish retired professional snooker player. He turned professional in 2011 after winning the European Under-21 Championship, and became Poland's first player on snooker's professional Main Tour. He was the first Polish player to make a 147 in competitive competition, doing so in a PLS Top 16 match against Marcin Nitschke. He was also a professional player from 2019 to 2021, having qualified by winning the 2019 EBSA European Snooker Championship.

== Career ==
=== Debut season ===
The 2011/2012 snooker season was Filipiak's first as a professional. At the age of 15 he became the youngest professional player (the record has since been taken by fellow Polish player Michał Szubarczyk in 2025). Filipiak performed impressively at the Snooker World Cup, beating the likes of John Higgins, Stephen Maguire and Marco Fu in the singles matches; this led to him being tipped as a future world champion by Ronnie O'Sullivan. However, his results in the ranking tournaments were disappointing: he entered five of the eight ranking events, but failed to win a single match, picking just four frames during the season. Filipiak also had a poor set of results in the PTC events throughout the season, as he played in 10 of the 12 tournaments but did not win a match. He finished the year ranked world number 86, out of the top 64 who retained their places for the 2012/2013 season. Filipiak entered Q School in a bid to win a place for the upcoming season and played in all three events without picking up a single victory and dropped off the main snooker tour.

=== Amateur years ===
Filipiak could only enter Players Tour Championship events the 2012/2013 season. He played in five, but could only qualify for the first round in three, losing his match once there in all of them. He entered Q School in 2014 but was unable to win enough matches to earn a main tour card. He played in three of the six European Tour events in the 2014/2015 season with his only win coming at the Gdynia Open, where he beat Gerard Greene 4–2, before falling 4–0 to Oliver Lines in the second round. He once again had an unsuccessful Q School. Filipiak lost in the quarter-finals of the 2015 IBSF World Under-21 Snooker Championship 6–5 to Josh Boileau.

After beating Gerard Greene 4–3 at the Gdynia Open, Filipiak made his televised debut in the second round against Andrew Higginson and lost 4–3. He won the 2019 EBSA European Snooker Championship. He therefore gained a two-year professional tour card to return to the tour for the 2019/2020 and 2020/2021 seasons.

At the end of the 2020/2021 season, Filipiak was ranked 86th, and therefore lost his place on the tour. He announced his retirement from professional snooker following a 6-3 defeat to Zhao Xintong during the third qualifying round of the 2021 World Snooker Championship.

== Performance and rankings timeline ==
Tournament	2010/ 11	2011/ 12	2012/ 13	2013/ 14	2014/ 15	2015/ 16	2017/ 18	2019/ 20	2020/ 21
Ranking (Note: It shows the ranking at the beginning of the season.)	(Note: He was an amateur.)	(Note: New players on the Main Tour don't have a ranking.)							76
Ranking tournaments
European Masters	Tournament Not Held						A	LQ	1R
English Open	Tournament Not Held						A	1R	1R
Championship League	Non-Ranking Event								RR
Northern Ireland Open	Tournament Not Held						A	2R	1R
UK Championship	A	LQ	A	A	A	A	A	1R	1R
Scottish Open	Not Held		MR	Not Held			A	2R	1R
World Grand Prix	Tournament Not Held					NR	DNQ	DNQ	DNQ
German Masters	A	LQ	A	A	A	A	A	LQ	1R
Shoot-Out	Non-Ranking Event						A	1R	WD
Welsh Open	A	A	A	A	A	A	A	1R	1R
Players Championship (Note: The event was called the Players Tour Championship Finals (2010/2011–2015/2016))	DNQ	DNQ	DNQ	DNQ	DNQ	DNQ	DNQ	DNQ	DNQ
Gibraltar Open	Tournament Not Held					MR	A	1R	1R
WST Pro Series	Tournament Not Held								RR
Tour Championship	Tournament Not Held							DNQ	DNQ
World Championship	A	LQ	A	A	A	A	LQ	LQ	LQ
Non-ranking tournaments
Six-red World Championship	A	A	A	A	2R	A	A	A	NH
Former ranking tournaments
Australian Goldfields Open	NH	LQ	A	A	A	Tournament Not Held			
Shanghai Masters	A	LQ	A	A	A	A	A	NR	NH
Paul Hunter Classic	Minor-Ranking Event						1R	NR	NH
China Open	A	LQ	A	A	A	A	A	Not Held	
Riga Masters (Note: The event was called the Riga Open (2014/2015–2015/2016))	Tournament Not Held				Minor-Rank.		A	1R	NH
International Championship	Not Held		A	A	A	A	A	LQ	NH
China Championship	Tournament Not Held						A	LQ	NH
World Open	A	A	A	Not Held		A	A	LQ	NH

Performance Table Legend
LQ	lost in the qualifying draw	#R	lost in the early rounds of the tournament (WR = Wildcard round, RR = Round robin)	QF	lost in the quarter-finals
SF	lost in the semi-finals	F	lost in the final	W	won the tournament
DNQ	did not qualify for the tournament	A	did not participate in the tournament	WD	withdrew from the tournament

NH / Not Held	means an event was not held.
NR / Non-Ranking Event	means an event is/was no longer a ranking event.
R / Ranking Event	means an event is/was a ranking event.
MR / Minor-Ranking Event	means an event is/was a minor-ranking event.

== Career finals ==
=== Amateur finals: 8 (4 titles) ===
Outcome	No.	Year	Championship	Opponent in the final	Score
Winner	1.	2011	EBSA European Under-21 Snooker Championships	(Scotland) Michael Leslie	6–3
Winner	2.	2014	Polish Amateur Championship	(Poland) Michał Zieliński	7–2
Runner-up	1.	2014	IBSF World 6-Reds Snooker Championship	(India) Pankaj Advani	1–6
Runner-up	2.	2016	Polish Amateur Championship	(Belgium) Tomasz Skalski	5–6
Runner-up	3.	2017	Polish Amateur Championship (2)	(Poland) Mateusz Baranowski	5–6
Runner-up	4.	2018	Polish Amateur Championship (3)	(Poland) Mateusz Baranowski	4–6
Winner	3.	2019	Polish Amateur Championship (2)	(Poland) Paweł Rogoza	6–3
Winner	4.	2019	EBSA European Snooker Championship	(England) David Lilley	5–4
