= Polish Amateur Championship (snooker) =

Tournament information
- Country: Poland
- Established: 1993; 33 years ago
- Organisation(s): Polish Association of Snooker & Billiards
- Format: Amateur event
- Recent edition: 2026
- Current champion: (Poland) Mateusz Baranowski

The Polish Amateur Championship is an annual snooker competition played in Poland and is the highest ranking amateur event in Poland.

The competition was first established in 1993. The championship is currently held by Mateusz Baranowski, who defeated Tomasz Skalski 5–0 in the 2026 final to win the national title for the record fifth time.

== Winners ==
Year	Winner	Runner-up	Final score	City
1993	(Poland) Arkadiusz Iwaniczuk	(Poland) Grzegorz Szymanik	5–2	Poland
1994	(Sweden) Martin Karlsson	(Poland) Bartłomiej Lachowicz	5–2	Warsaw
1995	(Poland) Kuba Sawicki	(Poland) Maksymilian Janicki	5–2	Lublin
1996	(Poland) Tomasz Kościelak	(Poland) Przemysław Kruk	5–4	Kalisz
1997	(Poland) Rafał Jewtuch	(Poland) Tomasz Kościelak	5–1	Wrocław
1998	(Poland) Marek Derek	(Poland) Rafał Górecki	5–4	Warsaw
1999	(Poland) Kuba Sawicki	(Poland) Marek Derek	5–1	Lublin
2000	(Poland) Marek Derek	(Poland) Rafał Jewtuch	6–2	Kalisz
2001	(Poland) Marek Derek	(Poland) Kuba Sawicki	7–1	Warsaw
2002	(Poland) Marcin Nitschke	(Poland) Krzysztof Wróbel	4–0	Kalisz
2003	(Poland) Rafał Jewtuch	(Poland) Marcin Nitschke	5–1	Warsaw
2004	(Poland) Jarosław Kowalski	(Poland) Rafał Jewtuch	7–2	Warsaw
2005	(Poland) Jarosław Kowalski	(Poland) Rafał Jewtuch	5–4	Ostrów Wielkopolski
2006	(Poland) Rafał Jewtuch	(Poland) Rafał Górecki	7–5	Warsaw
2007	(Poland) Marcin Nitschke	(Poland) Jacek Walter	7–4	Kalisz
2008	(Poland) Rafał Jewtuch	(Poland) Marcin Nitschke	7–6	Warsaw
2009	(Poland) Michal Zielinski	(Poland) Marek Zubrzycki	7–1	Lublin
2010	(Poland) Michal Zielinski	(Poland) Rafał Jewtuch	7–0	Warsaw
2011	(Poland) Rafal Gorecki	(Poland) Michal Zielinski	7–4	Zielona Góra
2012	(Poland) Krzysztof Wrobel	(Poland) Marcin Nitschke	7–0	Warsaw
2013	(Poland) Michal Zielinski	(Poland) Krzysztof Wrobel	7–6	Wrocław
2014	(Poland) Kacper Filipiak	(Poland) Michał Zieliński	7–2	Wrocław
2015	(Poland) Adam Stefanow	(Poland) Mateusz Baranowski	7–2	Lublin
2016	(Belgium) Tomasz Skalski	(Poland) Kacper Filipiak	6–5	Lublin
2017	(Poland) Mateusz Baranowski	(Poland) Kacper Filipiak	6–5	Lublin
2018	(Poland) Mateusz Baranowski	(Poland) Kacper Filipiak	6–4	Warsaw
2019	(Poland) Kacper Filipiak	(Poland) Paweł Rogoza	6–3	Warsaw
2020	(Poland) Antoni Kowalski	(Poland) Mateusz Baranowski	6–4	Lublin
2021	(Poland) Konrad Juszczyszyn	(Poland) Grzegorz Biernadski	6–3	Lublin
2022	(Poland) Mateusz Baranowski	(Poland) Konrad Juszczyszyn	5–1	Lublin
2023	(Poland) Antoni Kowalski	(Poland) Mateusz Baranowski	5–2	Lublin
2024	(Poland) Antoni Kowalski	(Poland) Mateusz Baranowski	5–1	Lublin
2025	(Poland) Mateusz Baranowski	(Poland) Daniel Holoyda	5–2	Lublin
2026	(Poland) Mateusz Baranowski	(Poland) Tomasz Skalski	5–0	Zielona Góra
