= Lewis Slusser =

American politician and physician (1820–1892)

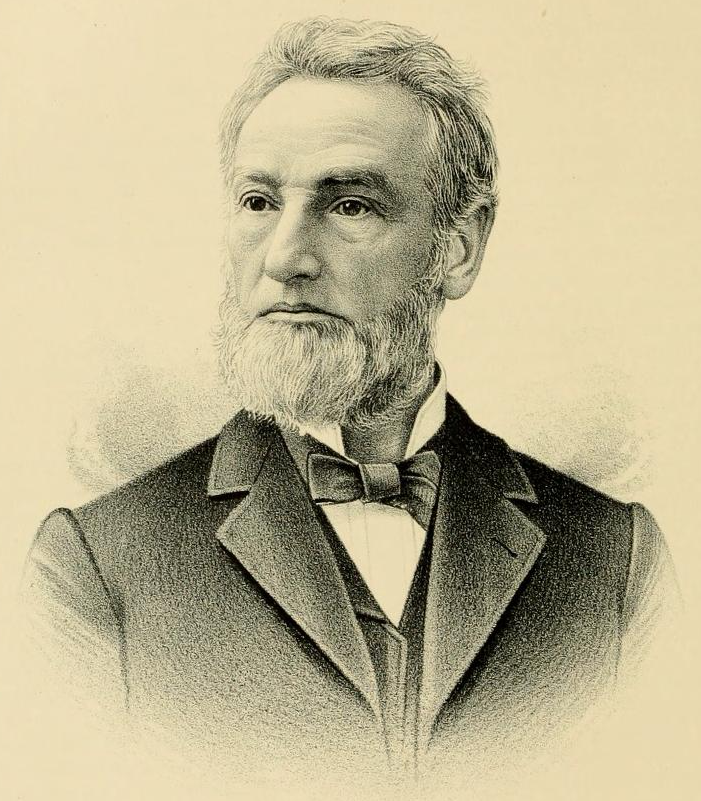
- Slusser in 1892 publication

Member of the Ohio House of Representatives from the Stark County district
- In office 1858–1862 Serving with James E. Chase
- Preceded by: William Hatcher and James W. Underhill
- Succeeded by: Solomon Lind and Joseph Schell

Personal details
- Born: January 21, 1820 Canton, Ohio, U.S.
- Died: December 23, 1892 (aged 72)
- Resting place: Canton, Ohio, U.S.
- Party: Democratic
- Spouse(s): Sarah Pierce (died 1863) Helena Ricks
- Children: 5
- Education: Jefferson College; National Medical College
- Alma mater: Ohio Medical College
- Occupation: Politician; physician
- Military career
- Allegiance: United States
- Branch: Union Army
- Service years: 1861–1865
- Units: 69th Ohio Infantry Regiment; 26th Ohio Infantry Regiment
- Conflicts: American Civil War

Lewis Slusser (January 21, 1820 – December 23, 1892) was an American politician and physician from Ohio. He served as a member of the Ohio House of Representatives, representing Stark County from 1858 to 1862.

== Early life ==
Lewis Slusser was born on January 21, 1820, at his family farm in Canton, Ohio, to Nancy (née Dewalt) and John Slusser. His father was from Cumberland County, Pennsylvania, and served in the War of 1812 and worked as a cabinet maker. Slusser grew up in Canton and attended public schools. He attended Jefferson College for three and a half years. He then moved to Georgia and taught school there for about five years. He studied medicine with Dr. Ramsey of Wilkes County, Georgia, for about three years. He then attended lectures at the National Medical College in Washington, D.C. Slusser returned to Canton and practiced medicine under instructors for two years. He graduated from Ohio Medical College in 1848.

== Career ==
In 1849, Slusser practiced medicine in Canal Fulton, Ohio. He remained there until the outbreak of the Civil War.

Slusser was a Democrat. He was a member of the Ohio House of Representatives, representing Stark County from 1858 to 1862. He was chairman of the committee on benevolent institutions. While in the legislature, he helped pass legislation for the appointment of a medical board of examiners that assessed fitness of surgeons in the U.S. Army.

In 1861, Slusser was appointed surgeon of the 69th Ohio Infantry Regiment. He later became medical director of the brigade and then the division. After his regiment left service, Slusser joined the IV Corps as surgeon of the 26th Ohio Infantry Regiment. He served in New Orleans and then went to the Mexican border. In November 1865, he was discharged.

Slusser returned to Canton and continued his medical practice until 1873. In 1873, he was elected as medical superintendent of the Cleveland Insane Asylum. In 1876, he resigned the role and returned to Canton to practice medicine. He continued working until 1889 when he had a stroke. He wrote articles for the News-Democrat.

== Personal life ==
Slusser married Sarah Pierce, daughter of Dr. Joseph Pierce. His wife joined him while he was in service in Nashville. She died in 1863. He married Helena Ricks, sister of Judge A. J. Ricks, of Pittsburgh, Pennsylvania. He had five children, including Georgia and Lucile.

Slusser died on December 23, 1892. He was cremated in Pittsburgh and the remains were buried at the family lot in Canton.
