= Elliot Slessor =

English snooker player

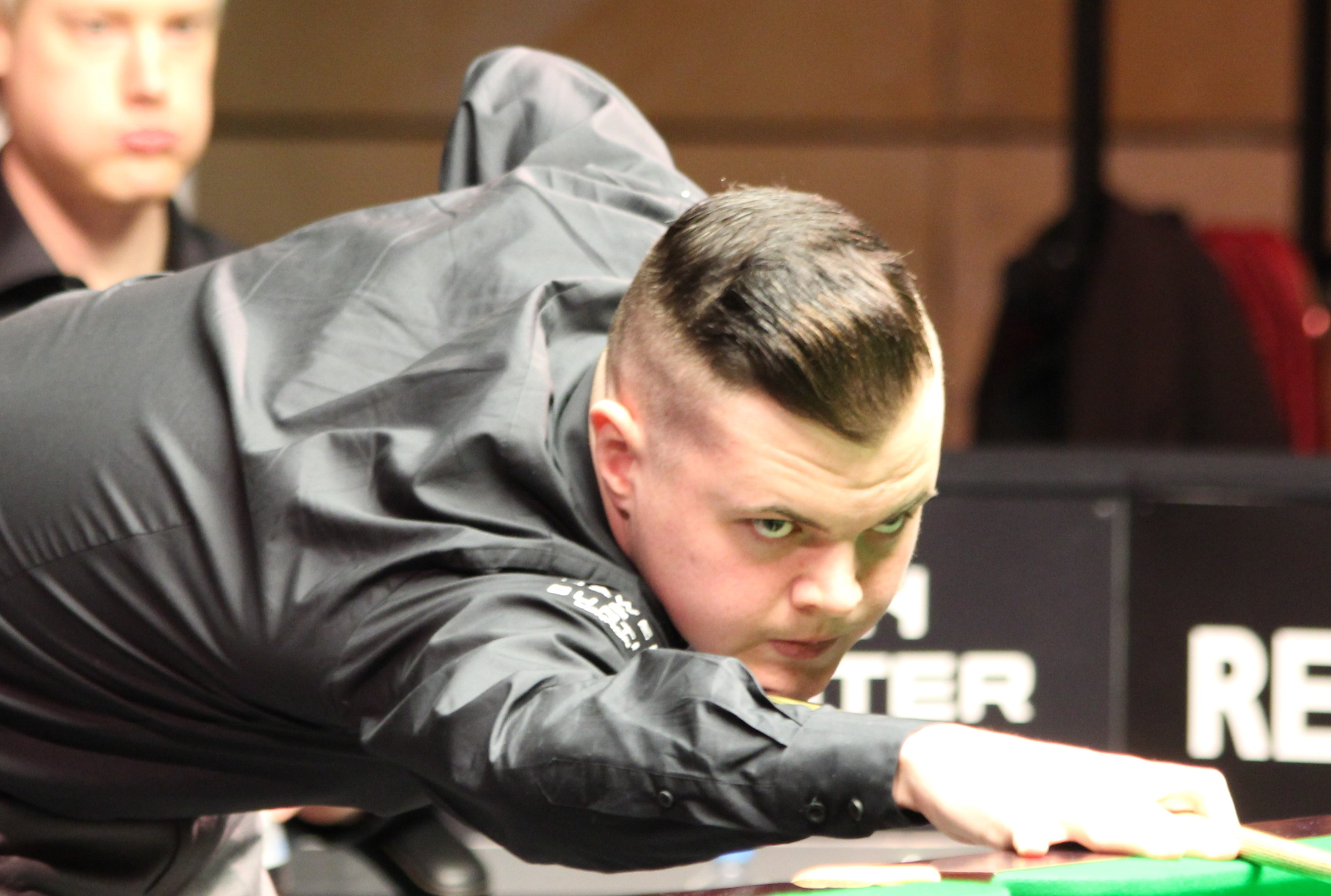
- Paul Hunter Classic 2014

Personal information
- Born: 4 August 1994 (age 32) Gateshead

Sport
- Country: England
- Sport: Snooker
- Professional: 2013–2015, 2016–present
- Highest ranking: 19 (May 2026)
- Current ranking: 24 (as of 26 October 2026)
- Century breaks: 123 (as of 4 November 2026)
- Best ranking finish: Semi-final (x5)

Elliot Slessor (born 4 August 1994) is an English professional snooker player.

In May 2013, Slessor qualified for the 2013–14 and 2014–15 professional Main Tour as one of four semi-finalists from the first Q School event. During this period he earned the nickname “The Gateshead Grinder” in reference to his fiery demeanour at the table and mouth movements during his cue action.

== Career ==
Slessor began playing snooker at the age of eight after his aunt bought him a table for Christmas. He joined the main snooker tour in May 2013 after he won through the 2013 Q School courtesy of a 4–0 victory over Chris Wakelin.

=== 2013/2014 season ===
Slessor's first wins as a professional were at the qualifying rounds of the 2013 Australian Goldfields Open 5–4 against Jamie Clarke and 5–2 against Cao Yupeng, before losing 5–2 to Simon Bedford. His debut at the main stage of a ranking event came at the Indian Open by seeing off Kurt Maflin 4–2. In New Delhi he lost 4–2 to Mark Davis. Slessor also suffered first round exits at the UK Championship and Welsh Open 6–2 to Liang Wenbo and 4–1 to Stephen Maguire respectively. He finished his first season on tour ranked world number 112.

=== 2014/2015 season ===
Slessor automatically played in the opening rounds of the UK Championship and Welsh Open, where he was knocked out 6–4 by David Gilbert and 4–3 by Jamie Cope. He qualified for the China Open by coming back from 3–1 down against Xiao Guodong to win 5–4. He then raced into a 3–0 lead over Matthew Selt and held on to beat him 5–3 and play in the last 32 of a ranking event for the first time in his career. Slessor faced reigning world champion Mark Selby and was thrashed 5–0. He played in Q School to try and win his place back on the tour as he finished the season as the world number 91. Slessor was beaten in the third round of the first event of the 2015 Q School 4–1 by Oliver Brown and was docked three frames in the second round of event two after arriving late and went on to lose 4–1 against Alex Taubman.

=== 2015/2016 season ===
Slessor played in five of the six European Tour events and reached the main draw in all of them. His only win came against Liang Wenbo 4–0 at the Gdynia Open, before losing 4–1 to Robin Hull in the second round. Slessor gained a two-year tour card starting in the 2016–17 season after coming through qualifying from the EBSA Play-Offs at the end of the 2015–16 season. Slessor beat Jamie Clarke 4–3 in the final round.

=== 2016/2017 season ===
Slessor got to the second round of four ranking events in the 2016–17 season, but lost all of them. This did include a 4–3 victory over home favourite Mark Williams in the opening round of the Welsh Open, where Slessor made a break of 90 in the final frame.

=== 2017/2018 season ===
In Indian Open, Slessor got to the quarter-final, by beating Alan McManus 4–3, Joe Perry 4–3, by leading 3–0, Shaun Murphy 4–1, before losing Mark King 2–4. Slessor got his best ranking finish in his career in the Northern Ireland Open. He beat Ronnie O'Sullivan in the third round by 4–1, before losing 2–6 by Mark Williams.

In the 2019 Welsh Open, Slessor faced Zhang Anda in the last 32. Leading 2-1, Slessor required 7 snookers to win the frame. He got the 7 snookers he required, but missed the pink. He lost that frame, but went on to win the match 4-2. He lost 4-2 to Kurt Maflin in the last 16.

== Performance and rankings timeline ==
| Tournament | 2011/ 12 | 2012/ 13 | 2013/ 14 | 2014/ 15 | 2015/ 16 | 2016/ 17 | 2017/ 18 | 2018/ 19 | 2019/ 20 | 2020/ 21 | 2021/ 22 | 2022/ 23 | 2023/ 24 | 2024/ 25 | 2025/ 26 | 2026/ 27 |
|---|---|---|---|---|---|---|---|---|---|---|---|---|---|---|---|---|
| Ranking (Note: It shows the ranking at the beginning of the season) | (Note: He was an amateur) | | (Note: New players on the Main Tour don't have a ranking) | 112 | | | 85 | (Note: Players qualified One Year Ranking List started the season without ranking points) | 76 | 60 | 50 | 60 | 47 | 42 | 29 | 19 |
Ranking tournaments
| Championship League | Non-Ranking Event | | | | | | | | | RR | RR | 2R | RR | RR | 2R | 3R |
| China Open | A | A | LQ | 2R | A | LQ | 2R | 1R | Tournament Not Held | | | | | | | LQ |
| Wuhan Open | Tournament Not Held | | | | | | | | | | | | 1R | 2R | 1R | LQ |
| British Open | Tournament Not Held | | | | | | | | | | SF | 1R | LQ | QF | LQ | 2R |
| English Open | Tournament Not Held | | | | | 2R | 1R | 2R | 3R | 1R | LQ | 2R | 2R | LQ | QF | 1R |
| Shenzhen Open (Note: The event was called the Xi'an Grand Prix (2024/2025–2025/2026)) | Tournament Not Held | | | | | | | | | | | | | 1R | 2R | 2R |
| Northern Ireland Open | Tournament Not Held | | | | | 1R | SF | 1R | 1R | 2R | 1R | 1R | LQ | SF | 2R | QF |
| International Championship | NH | A | LQ | LQ | A | LQ | LQ | LQ | 2R | Not Held | | | 1R | 1R | 2R | LQ |
| UK Championship | A | A | 1R | 1R | A | 1R | 1R | 1R | 1R | 3R | 1R | LQ | 1R | LQ | 2R | |
| Shoot Out | Non-Ranking Event | | | | | 1R | 3R | 2R | 2R | 3R | 2R | 2R | QF | 4R | 4R | |
| Scottish Open | NH | MR | Not Held | | | 1R | 4R | 2R | 3R | 1R | LQ | LQ | LQ | LQ | 2R | |
| German Masters | A | A | LQ | LQ | A | LQ | LQ | LQ | QF | LQ | LQ | 2R | 2R | 3R | 1R | |
| Welsh Open | A | A | 1R | 1R | A | 2R | 1R | 4R | 2R | 2R | 2R | 1R | SF | 2R | 1R | |
| World Grand Prix | Not Held | | | NR | DNQ | DNQ | DNQ | DNQ | DNQ | DNQ | DNQ | DNQ | DNQ | 1R | 2R | |
| Players Championship (Note: The event was called the Players Tour Championship Grand Final (2011/2012–2015/2016)) | DNQ | DNQ | DNQ | DNQ | DNQ | DNQ | DNQ | DNQ | DNQ | DNQ | DNQ | DNQ | DNQ | DNQ | 1R | |
| World Open | A | A | LQ | Not Held | | LQ | 1R | 1R | 2R | Not Held | | | QF | 2R | 1R | |
| Tour Championship | Tournament Not Held | | | | | | | DNQ | DNQ | DNQ | DNQ | DNQ | DNQ | DNQ | DNQ | |
| World Championship | A | A | LQ | LQ | A | LQ | LQ | LQ | 1R | LQ | LQ | 1R | LQ | LQ | LQ | |
Non-ranking tournaments
| Championship League | A | A | A | A | A | A | A | A | RR | A | A | A | RR | RR | SF | |
Former ranking tournaments
| Wuxi Classic | NR | A | LQ | LQ | Tournament Not Held | | | | | | | | | | | |
| Australian Goldfields Open | A | A | LQ | LQ | A | Tournament Not Held | | | | | | | | | | |
| Shanghai Masters | A | A | LQ | LQ | A | LQ | LQ | Non-Ranking | | Not Held | | | Non-Ranking Event | | | |
| Paul Hunter Classic | Minor-Ranking Event | | | | | 2R | 1R | 1R | NR | Tournament Not Held | | | | | | |
| Indian Open | Not Held | | 1R | LQ | NH | 1R | QF | 2R | Tournament Not Held | | | | | | | |
| Riga Masters (Note: The event was called the Riga Open (2014/2015–2015/2016)) | Not Held | | | Minor-Ranking | | LQ | 1R | LQ | LQ | Tournament Not Held | | | | | | |
| China Championship | Tournament Not Held | | | | | NR | 1R | LQ | LQ | Tournament Not Held | | | | | | |
| WST Pro Series | Tournament Not Held | | | | | | | | | RR | Tournament Not Held | | | | | |
| Turkish Masters | Tournament Not Held | | | | | | | | | | 2R | Tournament Not Held | | | | |
| Gibraltar Open | Tournament Not Held | | | | MR | 2R | 1R | 3R | 3R | 2R | 1R | Tournament Not Held | | | | |
| WST Classic | Tournament Not Held | | | | | | | | | | | 2R | Tournament Not Held | | | |
| European Masters | Tournament Not Held | | | | | LQ | LQ | 2R | LQ | WD | LQ | LQ | 1R | Not Held | | |
| Saudi Arabia Masters | Tournament Not Held | | | | | | | | | | | | | 6R | SF | NH |
Former non-ranking tournaments
| Six-red World Championship | NH | A | A | A | A | A | A | A | A | Not Held | | LQ | Tournament Not Held | | | |
| Haining Open | Not Held | | | Minor-Rank | | A | 3R | 3R | 1R | NH | A | A | Tournament Not Held | | | |

Performance Table Legend
| LQ | lost in the qualifying draw | #R | lost in the early rounds of the tournament (WR = Wildcard round, RR = Round robin) | QF | lost in the quarter-finals |
| SF | lost in the semi-finals | F | lost in the final | W | won the tournament |
| DNQ | did not qualify for the tournament | A | did not participate in the tournament | WD | withdrew from the tournament |

| NH / Not Held | means an event was not held. |
| NR / Non-Ranking Event | means an event is/was no longer a ranking event. |
| R / Ranking Event | means an event is/was a ranking event. |
| MR / Minor-Ranking Event | means an event is/was a minor-ranking event. |
