= Adam Stefanów =

Polish snooker player

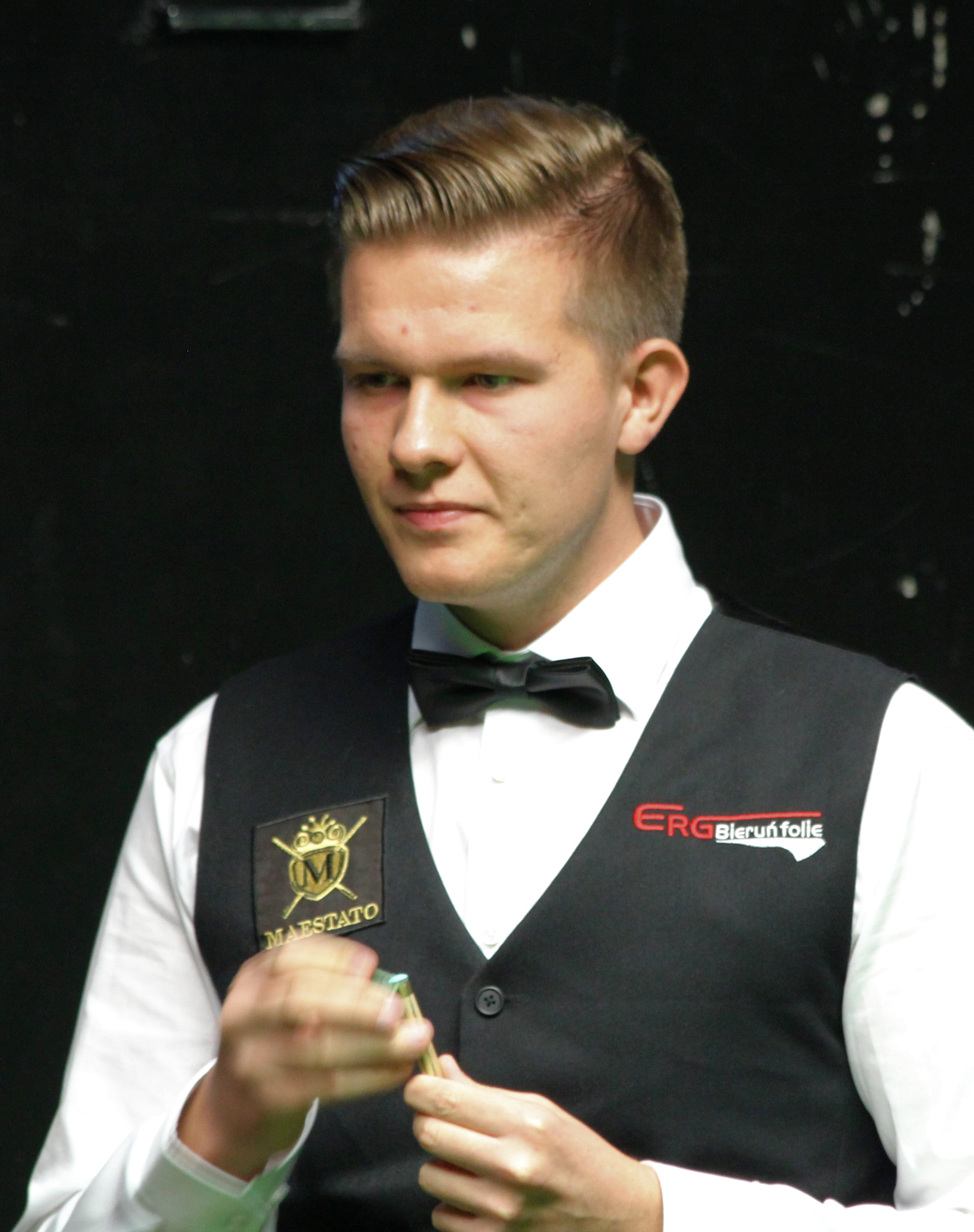
- Paul Hunter Classic 2018

Personal information
- Born: 22 March 1994 (age 32) Nowa Sól, Lubuskie

Sport
- Country: Poland
- Sport: Snooker
- Professional: 2018–2020
- Highest ranking: 88 (July–August 2019)

Adam Stefanów (born 22 March 1994 in Nowa Sól, Lubuskie) is a Polish former professional snooker player. Stefanów lives in Sheffield, England. He received an Invitational Tour Card after finishing runner-up in the 2018 WSF Championship. His two-year card started in the 2018/2019 season.

== Career ==
Stefanów was high enough in the Q School Order of Merit after the 2016 Q School to be given a place in a number of ranking tournaments in the 2016/17 season as an amateur. He recorded wins against Ben Woollaston in the Riga Masters, James Cahill in the Scottish Open and Michael Wild in the 2017 Welsh Open.

He was largely unsuccessful at the 2017 Q School in comparison to the previous year and therefore wasn't able to compete in any professional tournaments of note in the 2017/18 season, however, he finished runner-up in the 2018 WSF Championship in March 2018 which saw him receive a place in both the qualifying draw in the 2018 World Championship and a full tour card for the following two seasons. He won his first round tie at 2018 World Championship qualifying 10–8 against Gary Wilson, before losing out 4–10 against Thepchaiya Un-Nooh.

His first full season on tour was relatively quiet, winning just two matches all season, one however of which was quite a notable 6–4 win against Shaun Murphy in qualifying for the China Open. Over in China in the venue stages he was defeated in the Last 64 1–6 by Andrew Higginson.

In the 2019/20 season he defeated former two-time ranking event winner Michael White 4–0 to qualify for the Riga Masters but was defeated 1–4 by Liam Highfield in Riga. His final professional win that season was a 4–1 win over Luca Brecel in the English Open.

He dropped off the tour at the end of the season. He entered the 2020 Q School to try and regain his tour card, but withdrew from each tournament before it began, possibly due to COVID-19 travel restrictions at the time and has since not entered any amateur or professional snooker tournament.

== Performance and rankings timeline ==
Tournament	2016/ 17	2017/ 18	2018/ 19	2019/ 20
Ranking (Note: It shows the ranking at the beginning of the season.)	(Note: He was an amateur.)		(Note: New players on the Main Tour don't have a ranking.)	90
Ranking tournaments
Riga Masters	1R	A	LQ	1R
International Championship	A	A	LQ	LQ
China Championship	NR	A	LQ	LQ
English Open	1R	A	2R	2R
World Open	LQ	A	LQ	LQ
Northern Ireland Open	1R	A	1R	1R
UK Championship	1R	A	1R	1R
Scottish Open	2R	A	1R	1R
European Masters	A	A	LQ	LQ
German Masters	LQ	A	LQ	LQ
World Grand Prix	DNQ	DNQ	DNQ	DNQ
Welsh Open	2R	A	1R	1R
Shoot-Out	1R	A	1R	1R
Players Championship	DNQ	DNQ	DNQ	DNQ
Gibraltar Open	LQ	A	1R	1R
Tour Championship	Not Held		DNQ	DNQ
World Championship	LQ	LQ	LQ	LQ
Former ranking tournaments
Shanghai Masters	LQ	A	Non-Rank.	
Paul Hunter Classic	LQ	1R	1R	NR
Indian Open	LQ	A	LQ	NH
China Open	LQ	A	1R	NH

Performance Table Legend
LQ	lost in the qualifying draw	#R	lost in the early rounds of the tournament (WR = Wildcard round, RR = Round robin)	QF	lost in the quarter-finals
SF	lost in the semi-finals	F	lost in the final	W	won the tournament
DNQ	did not qualify for the tournament	A	did not participate in the tournament	WD	withdrew from the tournament

NH / Not Held	means an event was not held.
NR / Non-Ranking Event	means an event is/was no longer a ranking event.
R / Ranking Event	means an event is/was a ranking event.
MR / Minor-Ranking Event	means an event is/was a minor-ranking event.

== Career finals ==
=== Amateur finals: 2 (1 title) ===
Outcome	No.	Year	Championship	Opponent in the final	Score
Winner	1.	2015	Polish Amateur Championship	(Poland) Mateusz Baranowski	7–2
Runner-up	1.	2018	WSF Championship	(China) Luo Honghao	0–6
