= Rafał Jewtuch =

Polish snooker player (born 1973)

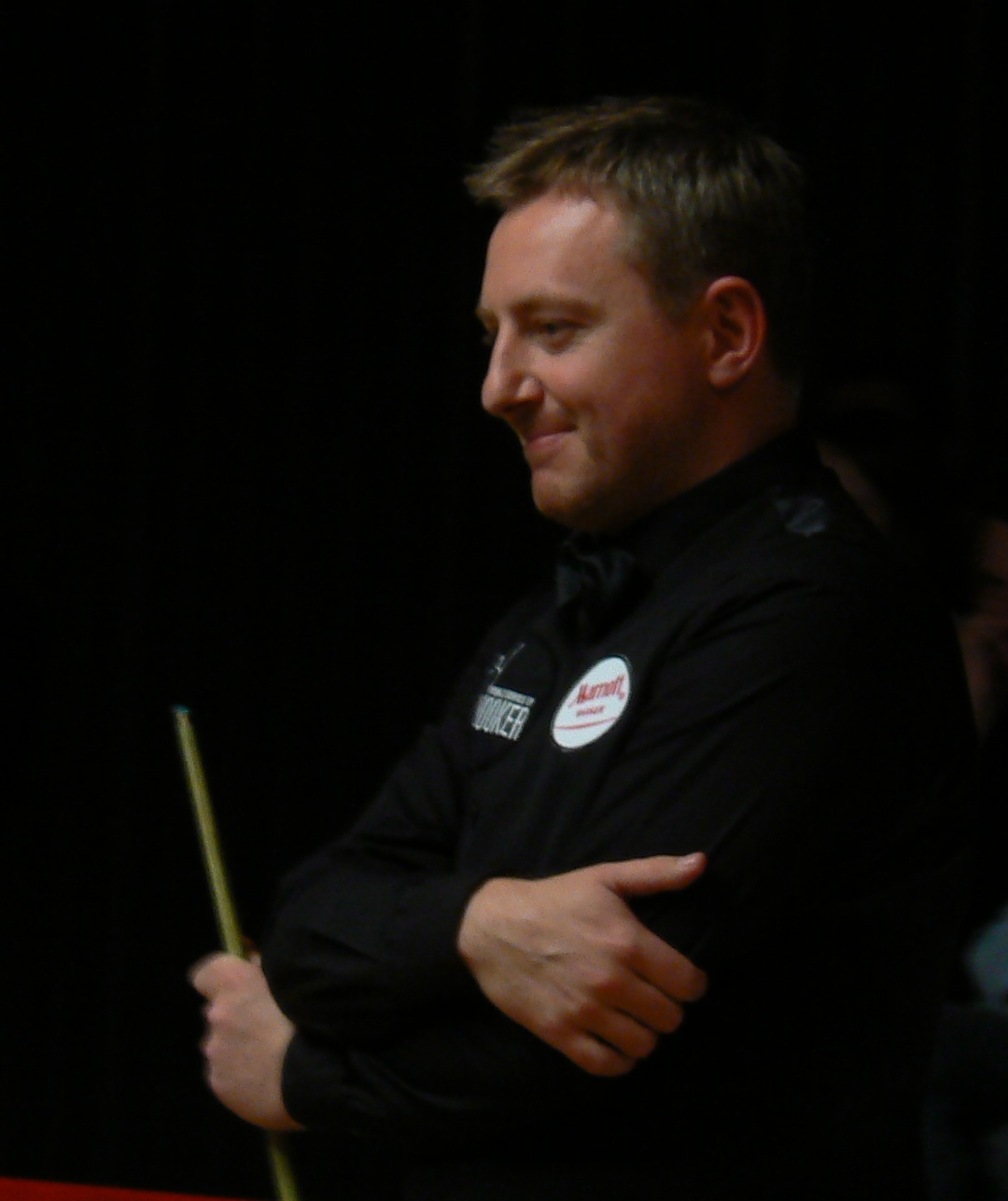

Personal information
- Born: 17 April 1973 (age 53) Warsaw, Poland

Sport
- Country: Poland
- Sport: Snooker

Marcin Rafał Jewtuch (born 17 April 1973) is a Polish amateur snooker player. He also commentates on snooker matches for Polish Eurosport.

== Tournament wins ==
=== Amateur ===
- Poland Senior International Team Championship - 2002
- 147 Club Open - 2003

| Outcome | No. | Year | Championship | Opponent in the final | Score |
|---|---|---|---|---|---|
| Winner | 1. | 1997 | Polish Amateur Championship | (Poland) Tomasz Kościelak | 5–1 |
| Runner-up | 2. | 2000 | Polish Amateur Championship | (Poland) Marek Derek | 2–6 |
| Winner | 3. | 2003 | Polish Amateur Championship | (Poland) Marcin Nitschke | 5–1 |
| Runner-up | 4. | 2004 | Polish Amateur Championship | (Poland) Jarosław Kowalski | 2–7 |
| Runner-up | 5. | 2005 | Polish Amateur Championship | (Poland) Jarosław Kowalski | 4–5 |
| Winner | 6. | 2006 | Polish Amateur Championship | (Poland) Rafał Górecki | 7–5 |
| Winner | 7. | 2008 | Polish Amateur Championship | (Poland) Marcin Nitschke | 7–6 |
| Runner-up | 8. | 2010 | Polish Amateur Championship | (Poland) Michał Zieliński | 0–7 |
