= Northern Ireland Open (snooker) =

Snooker tournament held in Belfast

- Part of the Home Nations Series

Tournament information
- Venue: Waterfront Hall
- Location: Belfast
- Country: Northern Ireland
- Established: 2016
- Organisation(s): World Snooker Tour
- Format: Ranking event
- Total prize fund: £550,400
- Winner's share: £100,000
- Recent edition: 2026
- Current champion: Kyren Wilson (ENG)

The Northern Ireland Open is a professional ranking snooker tournament held in Belfast as part of the four-event Home Nations Series. The players compete for the Alex Higgins Trophy, named for the late two-time world champion who was born and raised in Belfast. The inaugural edition of the tournament was held in 2016 and was won by Mark King. The reigning champion is Kyren Wilson.

== History ==
Professional snooker competition was first contested in Northern Ireland in the name of Northern Ireland Classic in 1981; subsequent ranking events were held from 2006 to 2008 but have been discontinued since.

On 29 April 2015, World Snooker chairman Barry Hearn announced that the Northern Ireland Open at a Belfast venue would be added to the main tour in 2016, as part of a new Home Nations Series with the existing Welsh Open and Scottish Open, and the new English Open tournaments.

In 2017, Yan Bingtao became the youngest player to reach a ranking final. Yan came close to breaking Ronnie O'Sullivan's record of being the youngest player to win a ranking event, which had stood for 24 years, but he narrowly lost to Mark Williams 8–9 after having led 8–7. This final also featured one of the biggest age gaps between finalists as Williams was almost 25 years older than Yan. Additionally, Yan also became the first player born in the 2000s to reach the final of a ranking tournament.

In 2018, 2019 and 2020, Judd Trump defeated Ronnie O'Sullivan 9–7 in each final. The 2020 tournament was staged outside Northern Ireland, at the Marshall Arena in Milton Keynes, because of the impact of the COVID-19 pandemic in the United Kingdom on the 2020–21 snooker season.

In 2021, Mark Allen became the first Northern Irish player to win the event, knocking out defending champion Judd Trump in the quarter-finals and beating John Higgins 9–8 in the final, after trailing 6–8. In 2022, Allen successfully defended the title, coming from 1–4 down to beat Zhou Yuelong 9–4.

In 2023, Judd Trump regained the title for a record-extending fourth time, beating Chris Wakelin 9–3 in the final. Trump reached the final again in 2024 but lost 3–9 to reigning World Champion Kyren Wilson who became the first right-handed player to win the event.

== Venue ==
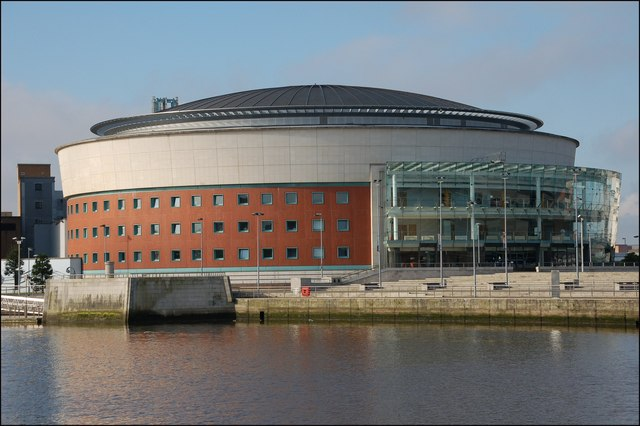
The Waterfront Hall in Belfast

Other than the first edition in 2016, where it was held at the Titanic Belfast complex, and in 2020 during the COVID-19 pandemic, the event has been regularly held at the Waterfront Hall, an auditorium adjacent to the River Lagan; it is the only venue within the Home Nation Series to have a multi-level balcony seating, which contributes to its unique atmosphere and is praised by players such as Kyren Wilson. The final of the 2025 event was attended by 1,435 spectators, a record UK attendance number only outside of The Masters, which is held in London.

== Winners ==
Year	Winner	Runner-up	Final score	Venue	City	Season
2016	Mark King (ENG)	Barry Hawkins (ENG)	9–8	Titanic Exhibition Centre	Belfast, Northern Ireland	2016/17
2017	Mark Williams (WAL)	Yan Bingtao (CHN)	9–8	Waterfront Hall	Belfast, Northern Ireland	2017/18
2018	Judd Trump (ENG)	Ronnie O'Sullivan (ENG)	9–7	Waterfront Hall	Belfast, Northern Ireland	2018/19
2019	Judd Trump (ENG)	Ronnie O'Sullivan (ENG)	9–7	Waterfront Hall	Belfast, Northern Ireland	2019/20
2020	Judd Trump (ENG)	Ronnie O'Sullivan (ENG)	9–7	Marshall Arena	Milton Keynes, England	2020/21
2021	Mark Allen (NIR)	John Higgins (SCO)	9–8	Waterfront Hall	Belfast, Northern Ireland	2021/22
2022	Mark Allen (NIR)	Zhou Yuelong (CHN)	9–4	Waterfront Hall	Belfast, Northern Ireland	2022/23
2023	Judd Trump (ENG)	Chris Wakelin (ENG)	9–3	Waterfront Hall	Belfast, Northern Ireland	2023/24
2024	Kyren Wilson (ENG)	Judd Trump (ENG)	9–3	Waterfront Hall	Belfast, Northern Ireland	2024/25
2025	Jack Lisowski (ENG)	Judd Trump (ENG)	9–8	Waterfront Hall	Belfast, Northern Ireland	2025/26
2026	Kyren Wilson (ENG)	Jak Jones (WAL)	9–2	Waterfront Hall	Belfast, Northern Ireland	2026/27

== Finalists ==
Name	Nationality	Winner	Runner-up	Finals
**Judd Trump**	England	4	2	6
**Mark Allen**	Northern Ireland	2	0	2
**Kyren Wilson**	England	2	0	2
Mark King	England	1	0	1
**Mark Williams**	Wales	1	0	1
**Jack Lisowski**	England	1	0	1
**Ronnie O'Sullivan**	England	0	3	3
**Barry Hawkins**	Scotland	0	1	1
Yan Bingtao	China	0	1	1
**John Higgins**	Scotland	0	1	1
**Zhou Yuelong**	China	0	1	1
**Chris Wakelin**	England	0	1	1
**Jak Jones**	Wales	0	1	1

Legend
The names of active players are marked in **bold**.

== See also ==
- Northern Ireland Trophy
- Irish Open (renamed to European Masters)
- Irish Masters
- Irish Professional Championship
- 2011 Alex Higgins International Trophy
