= 2024–25 snooker world rankings =

Preceded by 2023–24	2024–25	Succeeded by 2025–26

The sport of professional snooker has had a world ranking system in place since 1976. Certain tournaments were given "ranking" status, with the results at those events contributing to a player's world ranking. The events that made up the 1976–77 snooker season were the first to award players with ranking points. Originally, the world rankings were decided based only on results in the World Snooker Championship, but other events were later added. The system used for the 2024–25 snooker season was first used in the 2010–11 season, where players won ranking points based entirely on prize money won from these events. The rankings are based on the prior two seasons, with eight revisions after specific tournaments throughout the season. These revisions are used as official rankings, with points awarded in the current season overwriting those from two years prior.

Mark Allen began the season as the highest ranked player until he was surpassed by Judd Trump after the 2024 Xi'an Grand Prix. Trump retained number one status for the remainder of the 2024–25 snooker season.

== Ranking list ==
=== Revision dates ===
Seedings for each event were based on the world rankings, with totals being updated at specific revision dates. On these dates, ranking points from the 2022–23 snooker season were removed from a player's total.

Revision dates
Revision point	Date	After	2022/2023 points dropped
1	3 July 2024	Championship League	Championship League
2	25 August 2024	Xi'an Grand Prix	European Masters
3	7 September 2024	Saudi Arabia Masters	—
4	22 September 2024	English Open	—
5	29 September 2024	British Open	British Open
6	12 October 2024	Wuhan Open	—
7	27 October 2024	Northern Ireland Open	Northern Ireland Open
8	10 November 2024	International Championship	–
9	1 December 2024	UK Championship	UK Championship
10	7 December 2024	Shoot Out	Scottish Open
11	15 December 2024	Scottish Open	English Open
12	2 February 2025	German Masters	World Grand Prix; Shoot Out; German Masters
13	16 February 2025	Welsh Open	Welsh Open
14	1 March 2025	World Open	Players Championship
15	9 March 2025	World Grand Prix	–
16	23 March 2025	Players Championship	WST Classic
17	6 April 2025	Tour Championship	Tour Championship
Total	5 May 2025	World Championship	World Championship

=== Seeding list ===
The following table contains the rankings during the 2024–25 snooker season; blank fields indicate that the player had no ranking.

Name	Seeding revisions									
Name	0 (Note: Rankings after World Championship.)	1 (Note: Rankings after Championship League.)	2 (Note: Rankings after Xi'an Grand Prix.)	3 (Note: Rankings after English Open.)	4 (Note: Rankings after Wuhan Open.)	5 (Note: Rankings after International Championship.)	6 (Note: Rankings after UK Championship.)	7 (Note: Rankings after Scottish Open.)	8 (Note: Rankings after Tour Championship.)	9 (Note: Rankings after World Championship.)
Mark Allen (NIR)	1	1	2	3	3	3	5	4	8	10
Judd Trump (ENG)	2	2	1	1	1	1	1	1	1	1
Kyren Wilson (ENG)	3	3	3	2	2	2	2	2	2	2
Luca Brecel (BEL)	4	4	6	6	6	7	7	8	7	38
Ronnie O'Sullivan (ENG)	5	5	4	4	5	5	4	3	5	5
Mark Selby (ENG)	6	6	5	5	4	4	3	5	4	7
Shaun Murphy (ENG)	7	7	7	8	8	9	8	7	15	13
Ding Junhui (CHN)	8	8	8	9	9	8	9	9	10	6
Mark Williams (WAL)	9	9	9	7	7	6	6	6	6	3
Ali Carter (ENG)	10	10	10	11	11	12	12	11	18	16
Gary Wilson (ENG)	11	11	11	10	12	10	11	16	17	17
Zhang Anda (CHN)	12	12	12	12	10	11	10	10	12	11
Tom Ford (ENG)	13	13	13	14	17	19	22	19	21	18
Jak Jones (WAL)	14	14	14	16	15	17	18	18	16	20
Barry Hawkins (ENG)	15	15	16	18	19	20	13	12	11	9
John Higgins (SCO)	16	16	15	17	14	14	15	14	3	4
Robert Milkins (ENG)	17	17	18	22	23	23	23	23	41	48
Ryan Day (WAL)	18	18	17	19	29	28	29	29	36	36
Jack Lisowski (ENG)	19	19	19	20	20	21	21	22	25	24
Si Jiahui (CHN)	20	20	22	13	13	13	14	13	13	14
Hossein Vafaei (IRN)	21	21	21	23	24	24	24	26	24	23
David Gilbert (ENG)	22	22	20	21	21	22	20	21	23	22
Zhou Yuelong (CHN)	23	23	24	26	26	30	31	32	32	31
Chris Wakelin (ENG)	24	24	23	24	22	15	16	15	20	15
Stuart Bingham (ENG)	25	25	25	25	25	25	25	24	19	21
Noppon Saengkham (THA)	26	26	26	27	28	27	27	28	29	32
Pang Junxu (CHN)	27	29	28	28	27	26	26	27	27	25
Neil Robertson (AUS)	28	27	27	15	16	18	17	20	9	8
Joe O'Connor (ENG)	29	28	29	30	32	31	33	37	30	27
Lyu Haotian (CHN)	30	31	31	33	33	34	35	34	37	37
Stephen Maguire (SCO)	31	30	30	32	31	33	32	30	26	26
Anthony McGill (SCO)	32	32	32	35	36	39	39	40	42	59
Ricky Walden (ENG)	33	33	34	36	37	38	36	38	40	39
Xiao Guodong (CHN)	34	34	35	29	18	16	19	17	14	12
Cao Yupeng (CHN)	35	35	37	42	44	46	47	50	59	62
Robbie Williams (ENG)	36	38	39	44	45	45	48	47	51	46
Matthew Selt (ENG)	37	37	33	34	34	35	34	33	34	33
Yuan Sijun (CHN)	38	41	38	39	39	37	41	39	33	29
Wu Yize (CHN)	39	36	43	31	30	29	28	25	22	19
Dominic Dale (WAL)	40	40	36	41	41	43	43	44	48	51
Jamie Jones (WAL)	41	42	44	47	51	54	53	57	60	50
Elliot Slessor (ENG)	42	44	42	37	35	32	30	31	28	28
Thepchaiya Un-Nooh (THA)	43	43	40	40	38	36	40	42	43	45
Jordan Brown (NIR)	44	45	46	46	46	50	52	51	52	53
Jackson Page (WAL)	45	39	41	45	42	41	37	35	35	35
Sam Craigie (ENG)	46	47	48	53	52	56	67	69	82	84
Joe Perry (ENG)	47	46	45	48	49	52	57	62	65	75
Matthew Stevens (WAL)	48	48	47	50	54	51	50	54	54	52
Jimmy Robertson (ENG)	49	51	52	38	40	40	38	36	31	34
Fan Zhengyi (CHN)	50	50	51	51	50	49	46	45	46	47
Scott Donaldson (SCO)	51	49	50	43	43	44	44	46	47	55
Tian Pengfei (CHN)	52	52	55	56	56	57	59	64	72	76
Anthony Hamilton (ENG)	53	59	61	58	61	61	64	65	64	69
Graeme Dott (SCO)	54	54	54	54	55	55	56	56	56	61
Michael White (WAL) (Note: Michael White's WPBSA membership was revoked in July 2024 after he was jailed.)	55	60								
Ben Woollaston (ENG)	56	55	59	49	47	47	45	49	44	41
Mark Davis (ENG)	57	56	56	59	57	53	51	52	53	54
Xu Si (CHN)	58	58	49	52	48	42	42	41	38	40
Jamie Clarke (WAL)	59	63	60	61	60	58	62	66	63	66
Aaron Hill (IRL)	60	64	62	63	62	64	60	59	55	49
David Grace (ENG)	61	62	65	66	65	66	66	67	69	81
Sanderson Lam (ENG)	62	61	64	64	64	62	58	58	62	60
Martin O'Donnell (ENG)	63	53	58	57	53	48	49	48	45	42
David Lilley (ENG)	64	57	57	60	59	63	61	60	58	57
He Guoqiang (CHN)	65	65	63	62	63	60	54	53	50	44
Daniel Wells (WAL)	66	66	53	55	58	59	55	55	49	43
Liu Hongyu (CHN)	67	67	66	65	67	65	63	63	57	56
Marco Fu (HKG)	68	69	68	69	68	69	68	71	70	67
Ashley Carty (ENG)	69	68	67	67	69	70	69	68	71	68
Martin Gould (ENG)	70	71	70	77	81	82	86	95	109	113
Louis Heathcote (ENG)	71	73	73	72	71	71	70	72	68	70
Stuart Carrington (ENG)	72	72	71	70	72	74	77	77	75	78
Long Zehuang (CHN)	73	70	69	71	66	67	65	61	61	58
Ian Burns (ENG)	74	74	76	79	82	83	83	81	84	82
Ross Muir (SCO)	75	75	77	73	77	76	75	78	77	71
Xing Zihao (CHN)	76	76	78	74	73	77	76	74	78	74
Ma Hailong (CHN)	77	77	72	78	80	75	74	76	74	77
Jiang Jun (CHN)	78	78	79	75	79	72	73	75	76	73
Alfie Burden (ENG)	79	79	75	76	74	79	79	80	80	79
Ishpreet Singh Chadha (IND)	80	80	80	68	70	68	71	70	66	63
Liam Pullen (ENG)	81	83	83	84	88	91	91	90	92	98
Andrew Higginson (ENG)	82	81	81	82	84	85	87	85	88	89
Hammad Miah (ENG)	83	84	74	80	75	80	82	84	83	80
Rory Thor (MAS)	84	85	84	81	76	78	78	79	81	83
Alexander Ursenbacher (SUI)	85	82	82	83	87	87	88	88	86	87
Stan Moody (ENG)	86	86	85	86	78	73	72	73	67	64
Andrew Pagett (WAL)	87	87	88	87	86	89	92	92	96	99
Jimmy White (ENG)	88	88	89	90	92	90	90	91	93	93
Liam Graham (SCO)	89	89	91	96	99	99	100	86	87	88
Dean Young (SCO)	90	90	87	89	96	95	96	93	97	96
Mostafa Dorgham (EGY)	91	91	94	108	105	108	111	110	110	114
Reanne Evans (ENG)	92	93	100	114	114	116	118	119	117	118
Manasawin Phetmalaikul (THA)	93	94	101	116	118	114	114	115	113	112
Ahmed Aly Elsayed (USA)	94	109	113	118	120	122	124	124	125	125
Allan Taylor (ENG)		100	106	102	98	101	105	103	101	97
Amir Sarkhosh (IRN)		111	98	97	102	97	99	100	98	100
Antoni Kowalski (POL)		100	106	102	106	105	101	99	91	92
Artemijs Zizins (LAT)		111	95	91	97	100	98	101	99	103
Bai Yulu (CHN)		111	115	120	122	121	112	114	114	116
Baipat Siripaporn (THA)		109	113	124	124	123	125	125	125	125
Ben Mertens (BEL)		95	92	94	94	92	94	96	94	94
Bulcsú Révész (HUN)		111	95	91	95	96	97	97	100	104
Cheung Ka Wai (HKG)		95	102	105	100	102	102	104	103	105
Chris Totten (SCO)		100	106	109	109	109	106	108	106	108
Duane Jones (WAL)		100	106	102	91	93	93	94	90	90
Farakh Ajaib (PAK)		95	102	111	112	111	113	112	112	110
Gong Chenzhi (CHN)		100	86	85	85	84	85	87	89	86
Haris Tahir (PAK)		111	115	120	107	107	109	107	108	107
Haydon Pinhey (ENG)		111	115	107	110	104	107	106	105	106
Huang Jiahao (CHN)		111	115	112	113	115	117	113	115	115
Jonas Luz (BRA)		111	115	113	115	117	119	120	120	121
Julien Leclercq (BEL)		111	95	100	108	110	103	102	104	102
Ken Doherty (IRL)		111	115	124	125	124	126	126	121	117
Kreishh Gurbaxani (IND)		111	115	119	121	120	120	117	119	120
Lei Peifan (CHN)		100	106	88	93	86	84	43	39	30
Liam Davies (WAL)		95	102	105	101	103	104	105	102	101
Lim Kok Leong (MAS)		111	115	120	116	119	121	121	122	122
Michael Holt (ENG)		100	106	101	104	98	81	83	79	72
Mink Nutcharut (THA)		100	106	109	111	113	115	116	118	119
Mitchell Mann (ENG)		95	102	115	117	118	116	118	116	111
Mohammed Shehab (UAE)		111	115	120	122	125	122	123	124	124
Oliver Lines (ENG)		111	115	99	83	81	80	82	85	85
Robbie McGuigan (NIR)		92	99	98	103	106	108	111	111	109
Sunny Akani (THA)		111	90	95	89	94	95	98	95	91
Wang Yuchen (HKG)		111	115	117	119	112	110	109	107	95
Zak Surety (ENG)		100	93	93	90	88	89	89	73	65
Hatem Yassen (EGY)						125	123	122	123	123
