= 2025 Tour Championship =

2025 Sportsbet.io Tour Championship

Tournament information
- Dates: 31 March – 6 April 2025
- Venue: Manchester Central
- City: Manchester
- Country: England
- Organisation: World Snooker Tour
- Format: Ranking event
- Total prize fund: £500,000
- Winner's share: £150,000
- Highest break: John Higgins (SCO) (144)

Final
- Champion: John Higgins (SCO)
- Runner-up: Mark Selby (ENG)
- Score: 10–8

The 2025 Tour Championship (officially the 2025 Sportsbet.io Tour Championship) was a professional snooker tournament that took place from 31 March to 6 April 2025 at Manchester Central in Manchester, England. The 17th and penultimate ranking event of the 2024‍–‍25 season, it followed the 2025 Players Championship and preceded the 2025 World Snooker Championship. It was the last of three events in the Players Series, following the 2025 World Grand Prix and the Players Championship. Organised by the World Snooker Tour and sponsored by the betting firm Sportsbet.io, the event was broadcast by ITV Sport domestically and by other broadcasters worldwide. The winner received £150,000 from a total prize fund of £500,000.

The event featured the top 12 players on the one-year ranking list as it stood after the Players Championship. The top four players on the list were seeded through to the quarter-finals. Mark Williams was the defending champion, having defeated Ronnie O'Sullivan 10‍–‍5 in the previous year's final, but he was beaten 3‍–‍10 by Ding Junhui in the first round. John Higgins won the tournament, defeating Mark Selby 10‍–‍8 in the final to claim his first Tour Championship title and the 33rd ranking title of his career. It was also the 100th ranking title won by a member of the Class of '92.

The final of the event produced eight century breaks, four by each player. This equalled the record for the most centuries in a best-of-19-frame match, which had been set by Neil Robertson and Judd Trump in the final of the 2019 Champion of Champions. The tournament produced a total of 39 century breaks, of which the highest was a 144 by Higgins in his semi-final match against Barry Hawkins.

== Format ==
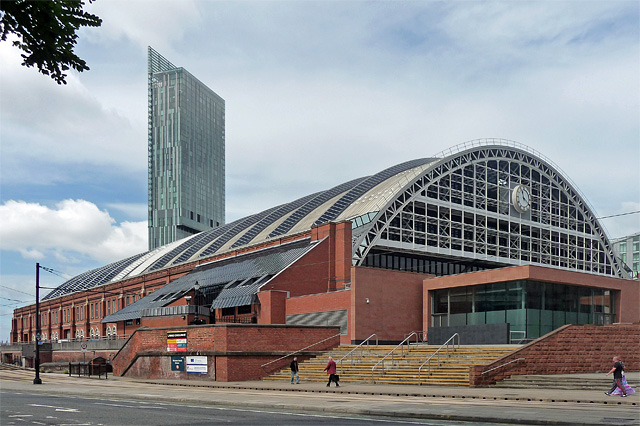
The event took place at Manchester Central in Manchester, England.

The event took place from 31 March to 6 April 2025 at Manchester Central in Manchester, England. The World Snooker Tour (WST) announced before the event that there would be a free fan zone at the venue. The tournament featured the top 12 players on the ranking list for the preceding season as it stood after the 2025 Players Championship. The 2024 edition of the event was the first to have 12 players, before which only the top eight had been included. The top four players on the list received byes through to the quarter-finals. Scheduling for the season resulted in the three events of the Players Series being consecutive in the calendar. All four first-round matches were the same as those in the previous event, the Players Championship. All matches were the best of 19 frames, played over two sessions.

=== Broadcasters ===
The event was broadcast by ITV and ITVX in the United Kingdom; TNT Sports in Ireland; Eurosport and Discovery+ in Europe (excluding the United Kingdom and Ireland); Migu, Huya, the CBSA-WPBSA Academy WeChat channel, and CBSA-WPBSA Academy Douyin in mainland China; Now TV in Hong Kong; Astro SuperSport in Malaysia and Brunei; TrueVisions in Thailand; Sportcast in Taiwan; TAP in the Philippines; and broadcast by the organisers World Snooker Tour in all other territories.

=== Prize fund ===
The winner of the event received £150,000 from a total prize fund of £500,000. The breakdown of prize money for the event is shown below:

- Winner: £150,000
- Runner-up: £60,000
- Semi-final: £40,000
- Quarter-final: £30,000
- First round: £20,000
- Highest break: £10,000
- Total: £500,000

=== Seeding list ===
Unlike other events, where the defending champion is seeded first, the reigning World Champion second, and the remaining seedings based on the world rankings, eligibility for and seedings in the Players Series tournaments are determined by the one-year ranking list. The top-12 players with the most ranking points acquired during the 2024‍–‍25 season, after the 2025 Players Championship is shown below:

Seed	Player	Points
1	Judd Trump (ENG)	1,063,200
2	Kyren Wilson (ENG)	691,800
3	Neil Robertson (AUS)	442,050
4	John Higgins (SCO)	368,750
5	Xiao Guodong (CHN)	326,500
6	Mark Selby (ENG)	305,000
7	Mark Williams (WAL)	285,600
8	Shaun Murphy (ENG)	277,900
9	Barry Hawkins (ENG)	276,550
10	Ding Junhui (CHN)	250,000
11	Si Jiahui (CHN)	234,200
12	Wu Yize (CHN)	220,600

== Summary ==
=== First round ===
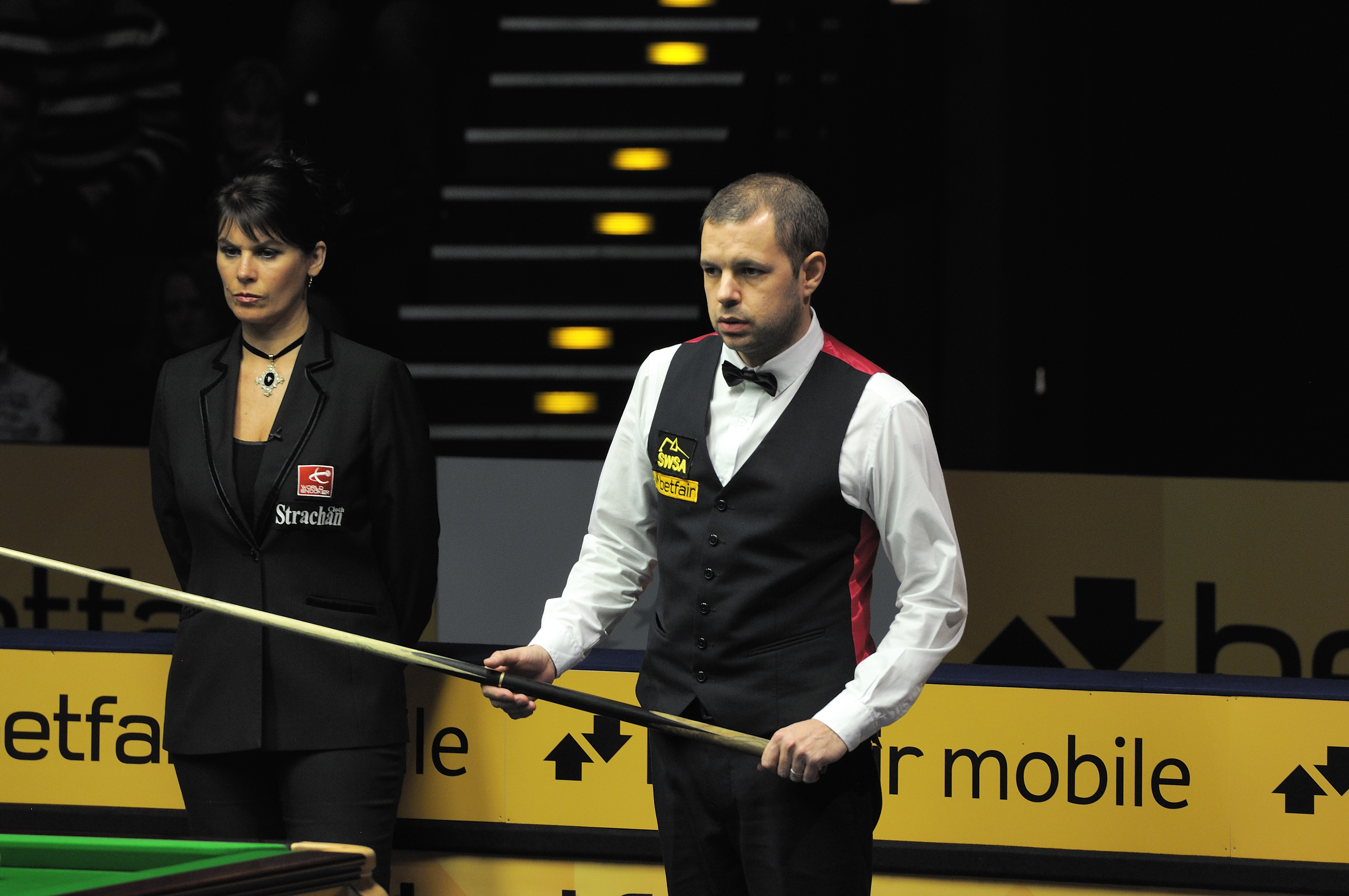
Barry Hawkins made five century breaks in the first eight frames in his opening match against Shaun Murphy.

The first-round matches were played on 31 March and 1 April as the best of 19 frames played over two sessions. All four first-round matches were rematches from the previous event, the Players Championship. Shaun Murphy played Barry Hawkins on 31 March. After the first session, Hawkins led Murphy 7‍–‍1, making five century breaks of 126, 101, 132, 131, and 134. Hawkins won all three frames in the second session to win the match 10‍–‍1. After the match Hawkins said: "I can't play much better than I did this afternoon." Hawkins was two century breaks away from the record made by one player in a best-of-19 frame match, made by Stephen Hendry in his 10‍–‍5 win over Ken Doherty in the final of the 1994 UK Championship. Hawkins said "It's a shame I didn't beat Hendry's record but to beat Shaun [Murphy] 10‍–‍1 is unheard of." He also commented that he felt like he was "in that bubble" and felt like he was wasn't going to miss. Murphy commented: "It's not the first time this season, when I have come off a match having lost and not felt I have done that much wrong. I have known Barry [Hawkins] for 35 years and that's one of the best sessions of snooker I have seen him play. He would have been ahead of anyone this afternoon. I made some mistakes, but he was unplayable."

Xiao Guodong played Wu Yize, starting on 31 March and playing to completion the following day. Wu was required to reach the final of the event to automatically qualify for the 2025 World Championship. Xiao recovered from 0‍–‍3 down to tie the score at 4‍–‍4 after the first session. Xiao also trailed at 7‍–‍8, but won the next three frames to win the match 10‍–‍8. After the match Xiao commented how his outlook on snooker had changed and that he had felt less pressure. "To do well at snooker you have to be happy. I have been in the UK for 17 years and I used to feel a lot of pressure. I was sad when I lost because I was a long way from home. Now I am comfortable, this is my second home. If I win I am happy, if I lose I still have friends to talk to." He also commented that "Wu [Yize] is very dangerous, he can pot any ball on the table. But I tried not to put myself under pressure."

Defending champion Mark Williams played Ding Junhui on 31 March and 1 April. During this match, Williams used contact lenses for the first time while playing, due to his deteriorating eyesight. After the first session, Ding led Williams 5‍–‍3, making a break of 116 in the seventh frame. Ding went on to take all five frames in the evening session, to win 10‍–‍3. After the match Ding said: "I just played the table. The first few frames yesterday I was so bad... I felt 70% or 80% tonight. Mark [Williams] had chances at the start of the match. But tonight he was missing balls and left me chances." Williams commented that using the contact lenses had not helped him, saying "the scoreline tells you all you need to know". Williams confirmed that he would play the next event, the World Championship, with the lenses as well, but that other players "will be praying they draw" him. Williams also commented that Ding had "outplayed" him.

Mark Selby played Si Jiahui, over both sessions on 1 April. After the first session, Selby led Si 6‍–‍2, making a 128 break in the 8th frame. Both players made a century break as Selby went on to win the match 10‍–‍6. In the 2024 event, Selby lost to Gary Wilson, stating he was considering retirement. Selby commented that he was "practising more now and enjoying it more. Last year I wasn't putting the work in because I wasn't enjoying the game. I feel quietly confident now... There are still some poor performances in there so I need to be more consistent."

=== Quarter-finals ===
The quarter-finals were played on 2 and 3 April. World number one Judd Trump played Hawkins on 2 April. Trump won two of the first three frames, but lost the next six frames to trail 2‍–‍7. Hawkins went on to win the match 10‍–‍5. After the match Hawkins commented: "I haven't got a clue what the difference has been this season, I am just going out and playing... I have been playing for 30 years and I have learned not to be stressed out." Hawkins also commented that he had not played as well as he had against Murphy but "I took most of my chances when they came along - it's not easy to beat the world number one."

John Higgins played Xiao on 2 and 3 April. After the first session Higgins led Xiao 5‍–‍3, making three century breaks of 104, 137, and 126. Higgins took all five frames in the second session to win the match 10‍–‍3. After the match Higgins said that his win at the 2025 World Open had given him confidence, saying: "it has given me back the belief in my game and my fighting qualities, that I can still do it at this level, that has been the most important thing. Big players are winning multiple events, that's what I need to try to do. I still want to compete with them. If I ever lose that I have got no chance."

Neil Robertson played Selby on 2 and 3 April. After the first session Selby led Robertson 7‍–‍1, making a 105 break in the 4th frame. Selby took the remaining frames in the second session to win the match 10‍–‍1, making breaks of 124 and 123 in the last two frames. After the match Selby commented: "last night 7‍–‍1 flattered me because there were three or four frames which could have gone either way. I just need to keep my tempo up and follow up each good performance with another one." Selby also had praise for Ding's performance during the season, saying: "What he has done for us in China is incredible. We owe him a lot, if it wasn't for him we wouldn't be going out there for so many big tournaments."

Kyren Wilson played Ding on 3 April. Wilson said that he was "full of confidence" ahead of the tournament, having won the previous event. After the first session Ding led Wilson 7‍–‍1. In the second session the match was delayed when Wilson suffered a nosebleed. Ding went on to win the match 10‍–‍5. After the match Ding said: "Before the match there was no pressure, but tonight I really wanted to win, especially as I had a big lead. I missed a few chances to win so I had to really concentrate. Maybe this is my lucky day, like 20 years ago. (Note: At the 2005 China Open, Ding Junhui beat Stephen Hendry in the final.) Winning big matches and long matches builds up my confidence. I have played Mark [Selby] many times and it is always very tough. He had a very good scoreline today. I am hitting the ball well on most shots, it's the way I like to play." Wilson commented: "I left myself with too much to do. I changed my tip before the session tonight and I was getting through the ball better. Every credit to Ding, he was fantastic this afternoon. It might be a good thing because it gives me two weeks to rest before the World Championship."

=== Semi-finals ===
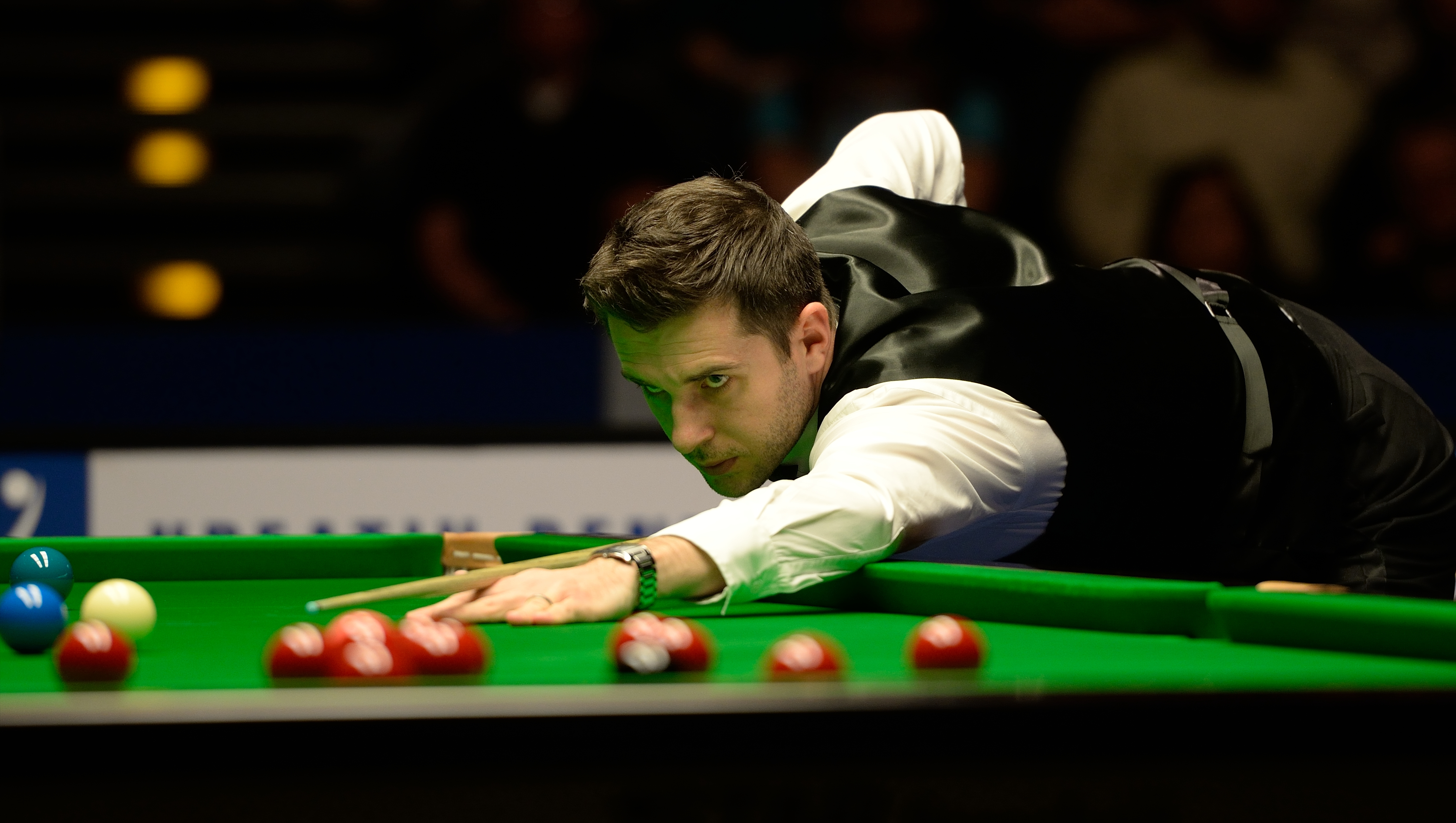
Mark Selby (pictured in 2015) defeated Ding Junhui to reach his 37th ranking final.

The semi-finals were played on 4 and 5 April as the best of 19 frames. Hawkins played Higgins on 4 April. At the end of the afternoon session the score was tied at 4‍–‍4, with Hawkins making a 140 total clearance in the 8th frame, the highest break of the tournament at that point. However this was overtaken by Higgins in the evening session when he made a break of 144 in the 12th frame. Higgins went on to make two more century breaks and win the match 10‍–‍7. After the match Higgins said: "In the first session, Barry [Hawkins] was hitting the ball well and looking superb, if he had gone 4‍–‍2 up he then could have gone 5‍–‍3 or 6‍–‍2, he was freezing me out. I was delighted to be 4‍–‍4, then I knew had to play better tonight, and I thought I played great." He also said that the venue reminded him of "Alexandra Palace on a smaller scale." Hawkins commented: "It was a good match, I just had a few loose shots and John [Higgins] punished me heavily, he looked at the top of his game. It has still been a good week but I am disappointed right now."

Selby played Ding on 5 April. At the end of the afternoon session Selby led Ding 6‍–‍2. Selby then took all four frames in the evening session to win the match 10‍–‍2. After the match Selby commented: "I played good stuff all day. The last frame of the afternoon session was important, to go 6‍–‍2 ahead, as 5‍–‍3 could have made it a different game tonight. I have been playing with more belief this season and that has allowed me to be more natural and free-flowing so I think that's why I have scored more heavily. My safety let me down last season but now it's back where I want it to be." Selby also commented on his opponent in the final, John Higgins - "I have got so much respect for him, he's one of my all time favourite players, and for him to still be competing like this is incredible. It's a chance for me to judge where my game is." Having defeated Ding, Selby faced the "Ding Junhui curse" playing Higgins in the final. Every opponent that had defeated Ding during the season had gone on to lose in the next round.

=== Final ===
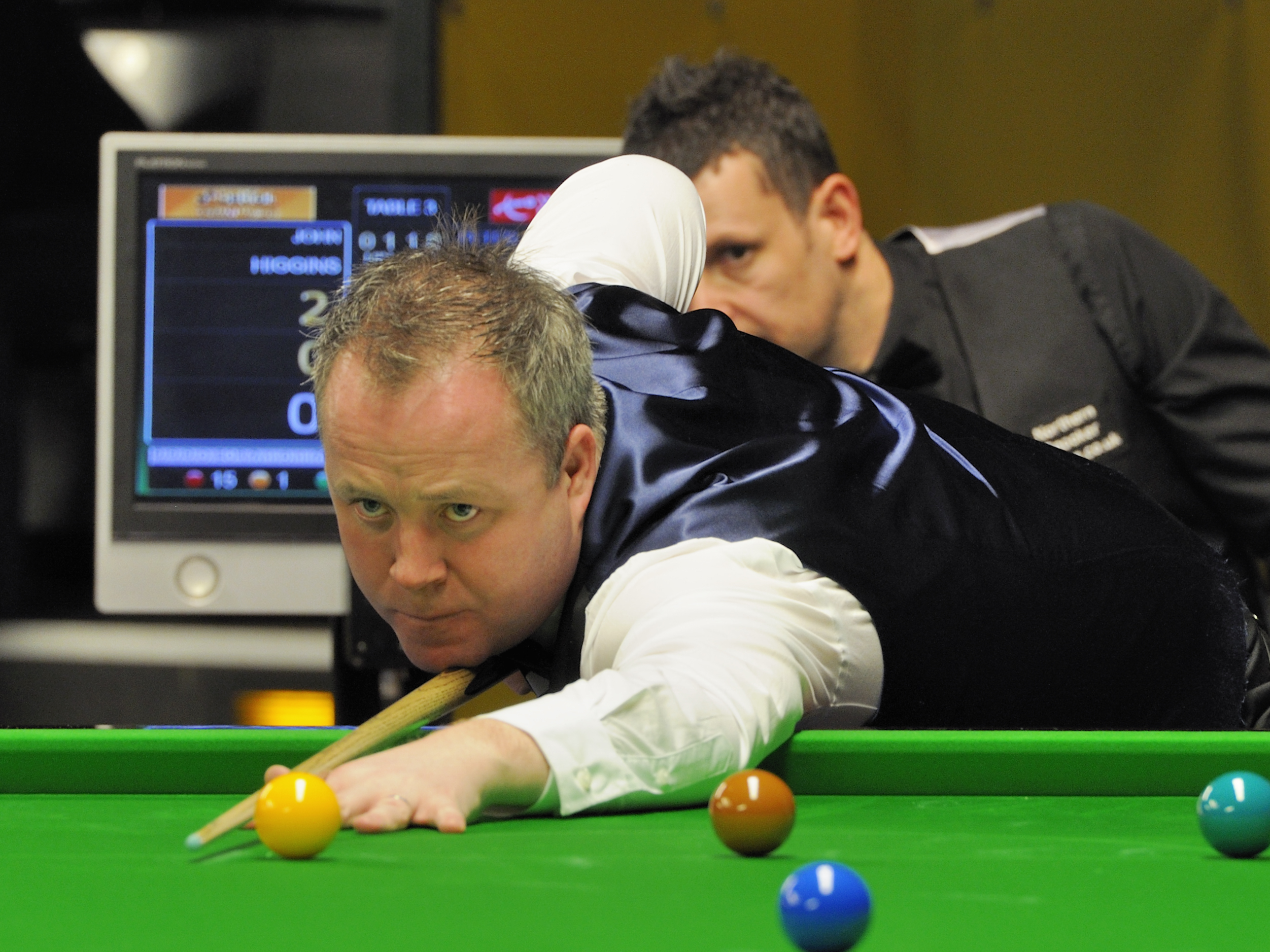
John Higgins (pictured in 2013), contesting his 58th ranking final, won the tournament.

The final was played on 6 April as the best of 19 frames, between Higgins and Selby. Higgins was contesting his 58th ranking final, while Selby his 37th. In the opening session, Higgins won five of the first six frames, but Selby ended the session with back-to-back centuries, reducing Higgins's lead to two frames at 5‍–‍3. Selby also won the first five frames of the evening session, to win a total of seven consecutive frames. During these seven frames, Selby cumulatively outscored Higgins by 767 points to 66 as he moved 8‍–‍5 ahead. However, Higgins then won five consecutive frames for a 10‍–‍8 victory, securing his first Tour Championship title and his 33rd ranking title. This was also the 100th ranking title won by the Class of '92. The final produced eight centuries, four by each player, equalling the record for the most centuries in a best-of-19-frame match that had been set by Neil Robertson and Trump in the 2019 Champion of Champions final. Higgins called the victory his "best ever win." "You are playing a monster of a player," said Higgins after the match. "To be 5‍–‍1 up and to be frozen out to be 8‍–‍5 behind, you don't come back and win five in a row against Mark Selby normally. I managed to do it, so it was incredible." His opponent, Selby said "[Higgins] is incredible... That is why he is an all-time great. The way he played from 8‍–‍5. I put it to him and he stood up like the warrior he is." Higgins advanced from sixth to third in the world rankings following his win. Selby's loss meant that the "Ding Junhui curse" continued.

== Tournament draw ==
Numbers in parentheses after the players' names denote the players' seedings and players in bold denote match winners. All matches were played as the best of 19 frames.

Seeded players 1 to 4 received a bye in the first round.

**First round** Best of 19 frames
31 March
Shaun Murphy (ENG) (8)	1
**Barry Hawkins (ENG) (9)**	**10**
31 March and 1 April
**Xiao Guodong (CHN) (5)**	**10**
Wu Yize (CHN) (12)	8
1 April
**Mark Selby (ENG) (6)**	**10**
Si Jiahui (CHN) (11)	6
31 March and 1 April
Mark Williams (WAL) (7)	3
**Ding Junhui (CHN) (10)**	**10**

**Quarter-finals**; Best of 19 frames
2 April
Judd Trump (ENG) (1)	5
**Barry Hawkins (ENG) (9)**	**10**
2 and 3 April
**John Higgins (SCO) (4)**	**10**
Xiao Guodong (CHN) (5)	3
2 and 3 April
Neil Robertson (AUS) (3)	1
**Mark Selby (ENG) (6)**	**10**
3 April
Kyren Wilson (ENG) (2)	5
**Ding Junhui (CHN) (10)**	**10**

**Semi-finals**; Best of 19 frames
4 April
Barry Hawkins (ENG) (9)	7
**John Higgins (SCO) (4)**	**10**
5 April
**Mark Selby (ENG) (6)**	**10**
Ding Junhui (CHN) (10)	2

**Final**; Best of 19 frames
6 April
**John Higgins (SCO) (4)**	**10**
Mark Selby (ENG) (6)	8

=== Final ===
Final
Final: Best of 19 frames. Referee: Marcel Eckardt; Manchester Central in Manchester, England, 6 April 2025
**John Higgins** (4); Scotland	**10**–8	Mark Selby (6); England
Afternoon: **66**–6, 0–**135** (135), **94**–0, **102**–0 (102), **73**–22, **102**–4 (102), 0–**136** (112), 0–**136** (136); Evening: 1–**114**, 9–**67**, 25–**100**, 31–**95**, 0–**119** (119), **110**–0 (110), **72**–0, **65**–18, **84**–0, **132**–0 (132)
(frame 18) 132	Highest break	**136** (frame 8)
4	Century breaks	4

== Century breaks ==
A total of 39 century breaks were made in the tournament. The highest break was a 144 made by John Higgins in the 12th frame of his semi-final win over Barry Hawkins.

- 144, 137, 132, 130, 126, 110, 107, 104, 102, 102, 100 – John Higgins
- 140, 134, 132, 131, 126, 125, 121, 101 – Barry Hawkins
- 136, 136, 135, 128, 124, 123, 119, 112, 105, 104, 103 – Mark Selby
- 126, 116, 102 – Ding Junhui
- 125, 114 – Si Jiahui
- 106 – Kyren Wilson
- 103 – Judd Trump
- 100 – Wu Yize
- 100 – Xiao Guodong
