= Wu Yize =

Chinese snooker player (born 2003)

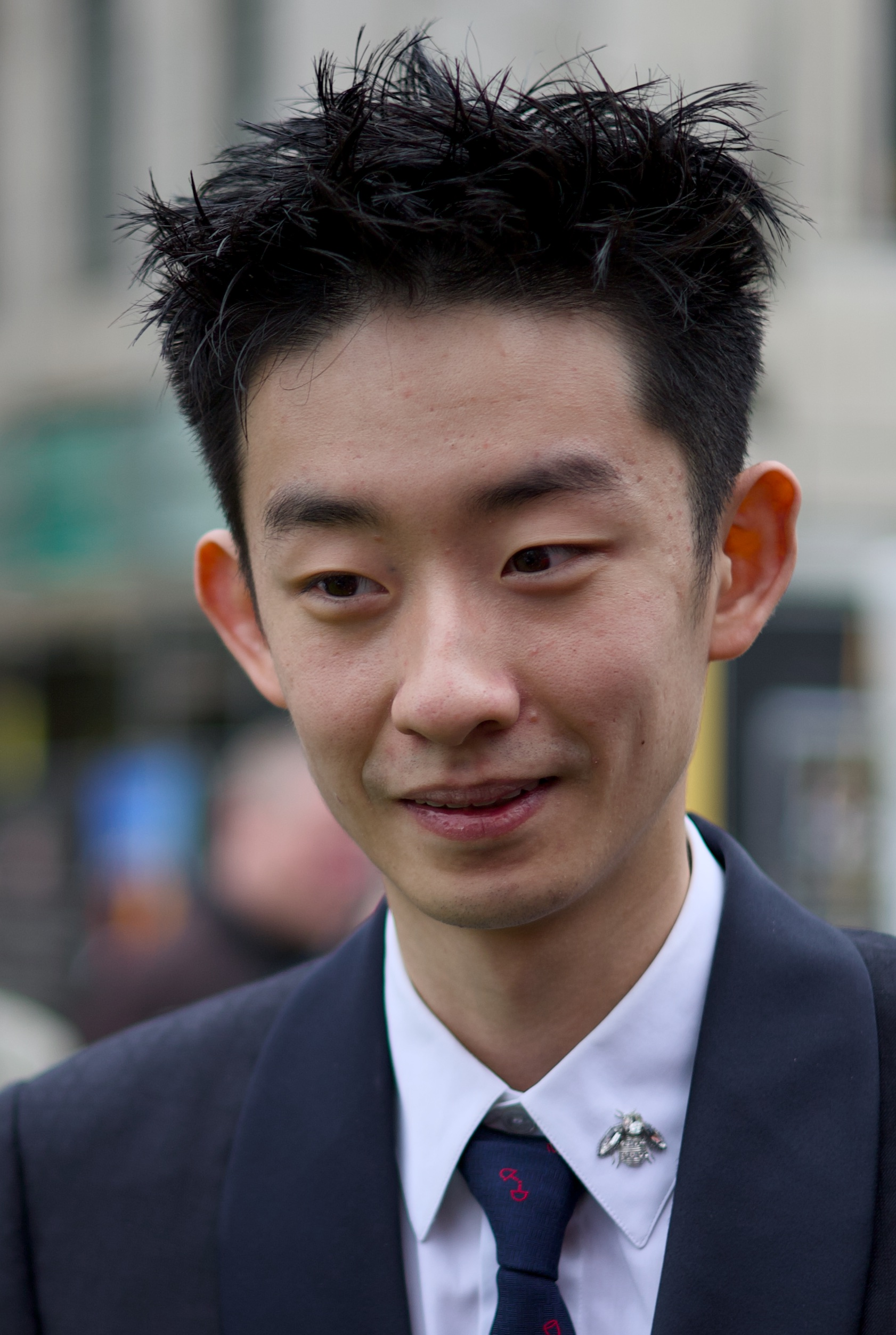
- Wu in 2026

Personal information
- Nickname: The Lanzhou Lion
- Born: 14 October 2003 (age 23) Lanzhou, Gansu, China

Sport
- Country: China
- Sport: Snooker
- Professional: 2021–present
- Highest ranking: 2 (October 2026)
- Current ranking: 2 (as of 7 November 2026)
- Maximum breaks: 1
- Century breaks: 171 (as of 10 November 2026)

Tournament wins
- Ranking: 3
- World Championship: 2026

Wu Yize
- Simplified Chinese: 吴宜泽
- Traditional Chinese: 吳宜澤
Transcriptions
Standard Mandarin
- Hanyu Pinyin: Wú Yízé
- IPA: [ǔ ǐ.tsɤ̌]
Yue: Cantonese
- Yale Romanization: Ǹgh Yìh Jaahk
- Jyutping: Ng⁴ Ji⁴ Zaak⁶

Wu Yize (Chinese: 吴宜泽; pinyin: Wú Yízé, pronounced [ǔ ǐ.tsɤ̌], approximately OO EE-TSUH; born 14 October 2003) is a Chinese professional snooker player who won the 2026 World Snooker Championship.

Born in Lanzhou in the Gansu province of northwestern China, Wu began training at the Yushan International Billiards Academy at age 11. He moved to Sheffield, England, with his father at age 16 and turned professional in 2021, aged 17. Known for his attacking style of play, he won his first ranking title at the 2025 International Championship by defeating John Higgins 10–6 in the final, which enabled him to enter the top 16 in the snooker world rankings. He reached the semi-finals of the 2026 Masters on his debut and made his first maximum break in professional competition during the 2026 Championship League.

At the 2026 World Snooker Championship, Wu made his third appearance at the main stage of the tournament, having lost in the first round in 2023 and 2025. He defeated Mark Allen 17–16 in the semi-finals and Shaun Murphy 18–17 in the final to win his second ranking title and first world title. He was the second-youngest winner in professional snooker history, after Stephen Hendry in 1990. Following his World Championship victory, he reached fourth in the world rankings.

== Early life ==
Wu was born on 14 October 2003 in Lanzhou in the Gansu province of northwestern China. He showed aptitude for snooker from a young age, and was taken by his father to the Yushan International Billiards Academy to work with the Australian coach Roger Leighton at the age of 11. He relocated to the UK with his father at the age of 16 to pursue a snooker career, and was based in Sheffield. He stayed in a single windowless room with his father after they had moved, leaving his ill mother in China.

== Career ==
Wu Yize won the IBSF U-21 World Championship in 2018 when he was just 14 years old, defeating Pongsakorn Chongjairak from Thailand 6–4 in the final. He was awarded a wildcard entry to the professional 2019 International Championship event, where he lost 5–6 to John Higgins. He made the last 32 of the 2019 Six-red World Championship, facing Higgins, this time losing 4–6. At the 2019 World Open, he faced Luca Brecel, losing 2–5 but making breaks of 85 and 130.

=== 2021–2025: Turning professional and 'rookie of the year' ===
Due to the suspension of the regular CBSA China Tour during the COVID-19 pandemic, a special professional qualification selection tournament was held in April 2021 at the CBSA World Snooker Academy in Beijing. Wu competed in the first of two events and successfully secured his professional status by defeating Pa Ruke 4–1 in the final round of the selection process, gaining a tour card for the 2021–22 and 2022–23 snooker seasons. In May 2022, at the end of his debut season, he was given the World Snooker Tour's 'Rookie of the Year' award following three last-32 ranking event appearances.

At the 2022 European Masters in August 2022, he defeated Luca Brecel and Ryan Day to progress to the quarter-finals for the first time before being defeated by Ali Carter. During qualifying for the 2023 World Snooker Championship, Wu defeated Allan Taylor and compatriot Tian Pengfei, before defeating Chris Wakelin 10–8 in the final qualifying round to reach the main stage of the World Snooker Championship for the first time. Wu was defeated in the opening round 3–10 by Neil Robertson. In October 2023, he reached the semi-finals of the 2023 Wuhan Open.

On 18 June 2024, Wu won his round-robin group at the Championship League. He reached the last-32 at the 2024 Saudi Arabia Snooker Masters where he lost to Judd Trump on a deciding frame despite having a 4–0 lead. At the 2024 English Open, he reached his first ranking final with wins over Judd Trump, Stuart Bingham and Ali Carter. In the final, he faced Robertson, recovering from 1–7 behind, to 7–8, but lost the final 7–9. The following month he reached the last-16 of the Wuhan Open. In December 2024, he reached the semi-finals of the 2024 Snooker Shoot Out losing 37–32 to Tom Ford. The following week, he came back from 2–4 behind to defeat Xiao Guodong 6–4 in the semi-finals of the 2024 Scottish Open. Playing Lei Peifan in the final, Wu lost the first four frames but recovered to trail 3–5, but lost the match 5–9. He commented that "It felt like I was playing without any touch or rhythm" and that he may have been "nervous" for the first four frames. He concluded the 2024–25 season by qualifying for the 2025 World Snooker Championship with a 10–9 victory over Matthew Stevens in the final round of qualification. In the first round at the main stage, he was defeated 8–10 by Mark Williams.

=== 2025–2026: World Championship win ===
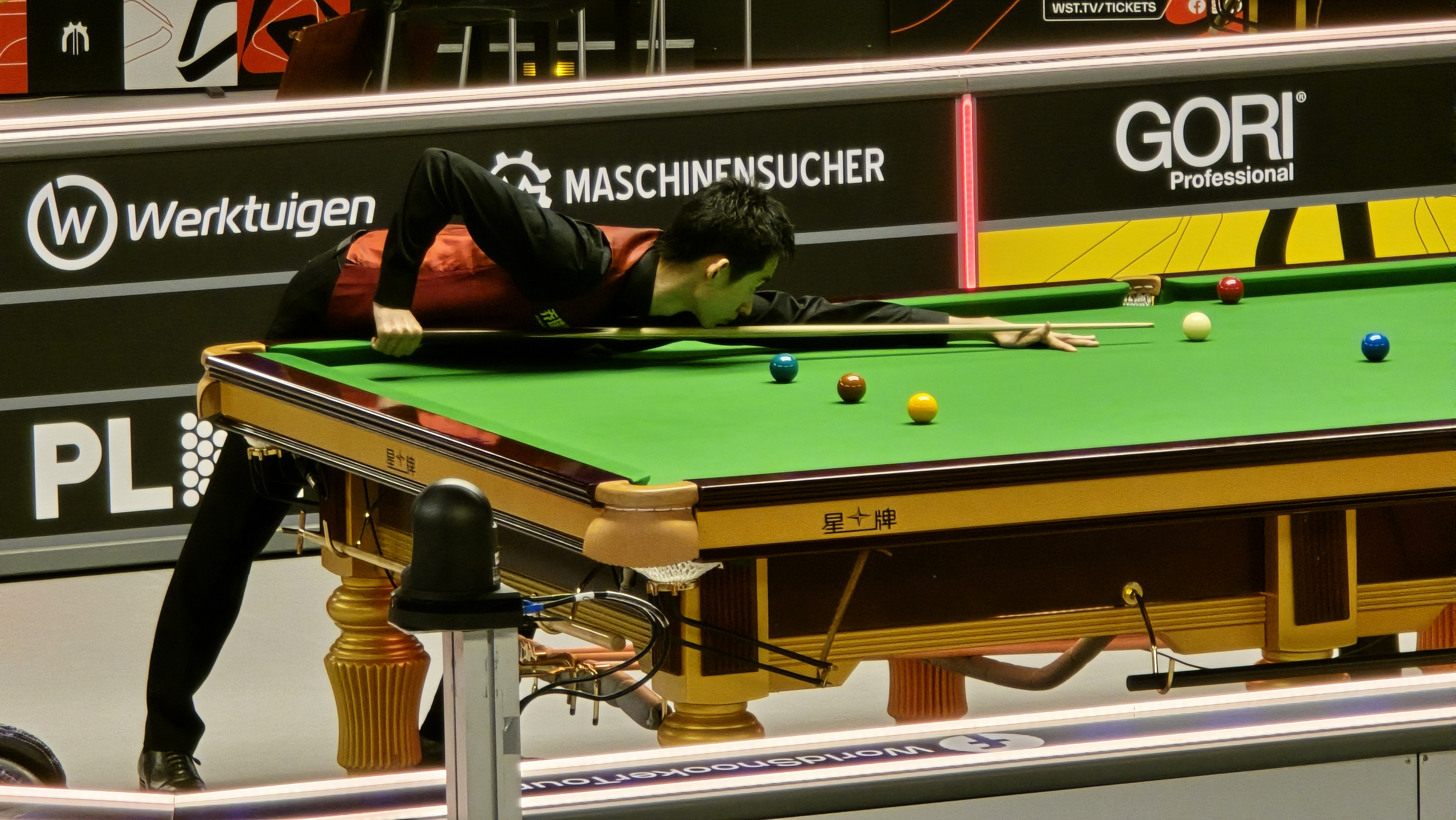
Wu at the 2025 German Masters

He topped his round-robin group at the 2025 Championship League in July 2025, going unbeaten against Craig Steadman, Wang Yuchen and Kreishh Gurbaxani. In the second round, he defeated Liu Wenwei and drew with Matthew Stevens but was unable to progress to the third round. In the last-16 of the 2025 International Championship in November 2025, he came from 0–4 down to defeat Judd Trump 6–4 before completing a whitewash over Barry Hawkins 6–0 and reached his third ranking final with a 9–6 win over reigning World Champion Zhao Xintong. He won his first ranking title beating John Higgins 10–6 in the final. Wu commented afterwards: "deep down I always believed I had the ability to win a title. Every day I kept thinking about it. I had a strong will to lift a trophy." He made fourteen century breaks during the tournament. This win moved him into the top 16 for the first time in his career.

Wu reached 13th in the world snooker rankings, allowing him to play at the Masters in January 2026. He defeated defending champion Shaun Murphy 6–2 in the first round, before reaching the semi-finals with a whitewash victory over Xiao Guodong. Reaching the semi-finals on his debut, he lost a deciding frame against Kyren Wilson. In the 2026 Championship League, Wu scored the first maximum break of his career in a 3–1 win over Oliver Lines. He went on to reach the final at the event, losing to Selby 1–3. In February, he reached the semi-finals at the 2026 Welsh Open, as he came back from 1–4 behind to win 5–4 against Jiang Jun.

Playing as a seeded player for the first time, he secured his first win at the main stage of the World Championships with a 10–2 victory over compatriot Lei Peifan in the first round of the 2026 World Snooker Championship. He then completed victories over Mark Selby and Hossein Vafaei to reach the semi-final. During his semi-final match against Mark Allen, he was involved in the longest frame ever recorded at the main stage of the World Championships, more than one hour and forty minutes. He went on to win the match in a deciding frame, securing his position in the final against Shaun Murphy. He triumphed in the final, winning 18–17 in a deciding frame to become the second-youngest World Champion in snooker history only older than Stephen Hendry in 1990. His victory moved him to number four in the world rankings. Commenting on his win, Wu said: "I played for my family, for myself and for China. My parents are the true champions. Since I made the decision to drop out of school, my dad has been by my side. My mum has also been through so much over the years. They are the source of my strength and I love them so much."

At the 2026 Shenzhen Open, he reached beyond the last-16 of a ranking tournament for the first time since his World Championship win, and went on to win the title for his third ranking tournament win. Having won on 2 October in the quarter-final against Murphy, again on a deciding frame, he then defeated Judd Trump 6–1 to reach an all-Chinese final against Yuan Sijun, which he won 10–5. With the appearance in the final he overtook Trump to move to second in the world rankings.

== Personal life ==
Wu's mother altered the layout of the family home to fit a snooker table after he took an interest in the sport as a child. His father taught himself cue repair to support his son's training, having previously been a carpenter. In his childhood, Wu was coached by Da Hailin, a fellow native of Gansu province and former national champion, in addition to the Australian coach Roger Leighton. At the age of 13, Wu left school to concentrate on snooker full-time. To help fund his training, his father sold the family's only home in Lanzhou, and the family relocated to Dongguan in Guangdong province, where Wu trained at the Ding Junhui Snooker Academy. At 16, Wu relocated to Sheffield, England with his father. Speaking little English, the pair shared a cramped, windowless rented room — sleeping in the same bed — for their first two years in the city, while his father worked multiple jobs to cover living and training costs.

Wu has said he struggled with his mental health during his first year in England, recalling that he "wasn't mentally in a good place" at the time. During this period, his mother experienced ongoing health problems in China; Wu later said that, at a low point in his second year on tour, she had urged him not to return home, telling him she "could manage everything".

== Playing style ==
Wu is known for an unusually attacking, high-risk approach, regularly attempting difficult pots. Describing his approach after winning the 2026 World Championship, Wu said: "When I believe I can attack, I attack 100%, no matter the score, the situation, or the pressure." He has said he dislikes prolonged safety exchanges, arguing the sport benefits from a more entertaining and attacking style. The style has drawn comment from established players and pundits. Six-time world champion Steve Davis said players such as Wu were changing the sport by making it more aggressive, while 1991 world champion John Parrott remarked that "no ball is safe" against him. Shaun Murphy, who lost to Wu in the 2026 World Championship final, said Wu's incisive attacking play had made him difficult to defend against.

Wu has cited Ronnie O'Sullivan as an idol; the pair trained together in Hong Kong ahead of the 2025 International Championship, where O'Sullivan predicted Wu would become world number one within three years. He has subsequently been nicknamed "Little Rocket" by Chinese fans and press.

== Performance and rankings timeline ==
Tournament	2017/ 18	2018/ 19	2019/ 20	2021/ 22	2022/ 23	2023/ 24	2024/ 25	2025/ 26	2026/ 27
Ranking (Note: It shows the ranking at the beginning of the season)	(Note: He was an amateur)			(Note: New players on the Main Tour don't have a ranking)	69	49	39	20	4
Ranking tournaments
Championship League	Non-Ranking Event			A	RR	RR	2R	2R	A
China Open	A	LQ	Tournament Not Held						2R
Wuhan Open	Tournament Not Held					SF	3R	LQ	LQ
British Open	Not Held			2R	LQ	1R	1R	1R	1R
English Open	A	A	A	1R	2R	1R	F	3R	3R
Shenzhen Open (Note: The event was called the Xi'an Grand Prix (2024/2025–2025/2026))	Tournament Not Held						LQ	2R	W
Northern Ireland Open	A	A	A	LQ	LQ	LQ	1R	2R	WD
International Championship	A	A	LQ	Not Held		LQ	2R	W	2R
UK Championship	A	A	A	3R	LQ	LQ	2R	2R	
Shoot Out	A	A	A	A	1R	1R	SF	2R	
Scottish Open	A	A	A	1R	LQ	LQ	F	3R	
German Masters	A	A	A	LQ	LQ	LQ	QF	WD	
Welsh Open	A	A	A	LQ	1R	1R	2R	SF	
World Grand Prix	Did Not Qualify					1R	2R	QF	
Players Championship	Did Not Qualify						1R	1R	
World Open	A	A	LQ	Not Held		2R	2R	SF	
Tour Championship	NH	Did Not Qualify					1R	1R	
World Championship	A	A	LQ	LQ	1R	LQ	1R	W	
Non-ranking tournaments
Shanghai Masters	R	A	1R	Not Held		A	A	1R	SF
Champion of Champions	A	A	A	A	A	A	A	A	1R
The Masters	Did Not Qualify							SF	
Championship League	Did Not Participate							F	
Former ranking tournaments
China Championship	A	A	LQ	Tournament Not Held					
Turkish Masters	Not Held			2R	Tournament Not Held				
Gibraltar Open	A	A	A	WD	Tournament Not Held				
WST Classic	Tournament Not Held				2R	Tournament Not Held			
European Masters	A	A	A	2R	QF	2R	Not Held		
Saudi Arabia Masters	Tournament Not Held						5R	5R	NH
Former non-ranking tournaments
Six-red World Championship	A	A	2R	NH	LQ	Tournament Not Held			
Haining Open	3R	1R	2R	A	F	Tournament Not Held			

Performance Table Legend
LQ	lost in the qualifying draw	#R	lost in the early rounds of the tournament (WR = Wildcard round, RR = Round robin)	QF	lost in the quarter-finals
SF	lost in the semi-finals	F	lost in the final	W	won the tournament
DNQ	did not qualify for the tournament	A	did not participate in the tournament	WD	withdrew from the tournament

NH / Not Held	means an event was not held.
NR / Non-Ranking Event	means an event is/was no longer a ranking event.
R / Ranking Event	means an event is/was a ranking event.

== Career finals ==
=== Ranking finals: 5 (3 titles) ===
Legend
World Championship (1–0)
Other (2–2)

Outcome	No.	Year	Championship	Opponent in the final	Score	Ref
Runner-up	1.	2024	English Open	Neil Robertson (AUS)	7–9	
Runner-up	2.	2024	Scottish Open	Lei Peifan (CHN)	5–9	
Winner	1.	2025	International Championship	John Higgins (SCO)	10–6	
Winner	2.	2026	World Snooker Championship	Shaun Murphy (ENG)	18–17	
Winner	3	2026	Shenzhen Open	Yuan Sijun (CHN)	10–5	

=== Non-ranking finals: 2 ===
Outcome	No.	Year	Championship	Opponent in the final	Score	Ref
Runner-up	1.	2023	Haining Open	Yuan Sijun (CHN)	1–5	
Runner-up	2.	2026	Championship League Invitational	Mark Selby (ENG)	1–3	

=== Amateur finals: 1 (1 title) ===
Outcome	No.	Year	Championship	Opponent in the final	Score	Ref
Winner	1.	2018	IBSF World Under-21 Championship	Pongsak Chongjairak (THA)	6–4	
