= Lei Peifan =

Chinese professional snooker player

Personal information
- Born: 31 May 2003 (age 23) Ankang, Shaanxi, China

Sport
- Country: China
- Sport: Snooker
- Professional: 2019–2023, 2024–present
- Highest ranking: 25 (July 2026)
- Current ranking: 27 (as of 7 November 2026)

Tournament wins
- Ranking: 1

Lei Peifan (Chinese: 雷佩凡; born 31 May 2003) is a Chinese professional snooker player. While ranked 84th in the world, he won his first ranking event in December 2024, the 2024 Scottish Open, by defeating Wu Yize 9‍–‍5 in the final.

== Career ==
In May 2019, Lei came through Q School on the overall Order of Merit to earn a two-year card on the World Snooker Tour for the 2019–20 and 2020–21 seasons. He didn't retain his tour card after the end of the 2020–21 season but immediately gained a new two-year card for the 2021–22 and 2022–23 seasons by coming through Q School Event 3. In March 2024, by beating Australian Vinnie Calabrese from 5‍–‍3 down to win 6‍–‍5, Lei won the 2024 APSBF Asia Pacific Open Snooker Championship to earn another two-year card on the World Snooker Tour, starting from the 2024–25 season.

In December 2024, after never having advanced beyond the Last 16 of a professional tournament, Lei won the 2024 Scottish Open, defeating compatriot Wu Yize 9‍–‍5 in the final. It was only the fourth ever all-Chinese ranking event final and the second of the 2024–25 season (after the 2024 Wuhan Open). Ranked 84th in the world, he became the lowest-ranked player to win a ranking event since 93rd-ranked Dave Harold won the 1993 Asian Open. On his way to the final, he defeated Shaun Murphy, Stuart Bingham, Tom Ford and Mark Allen, all in deciding frames. He advanced to a career high ranking of 43 in the world due to this win.

He defeated defending world champion Kyren Wilson in a deciding frame in the first round at the 2025 World Snooker Championship, before facing eventual champion Zhao Xintong in the second round.

== Performance and rankings timeline ==
Tournament	2019/ 20	2020/ 21	2021/ 22	2022/ 23	2024/ 25	2025/ 26	2026/ 27
Ranking (Note: It shows the ranking at the beginning of the season.)	(Note: New players on the Main Tour don't have a ranking)	96	(Note: Players qualified through Q School started the season without ranking points)	77		31	26
Ranking tournaments
Championship League	NR	WD	A	RR	RR	2R	3R
China Open	Tournament Not Held						LQ
Wuhan Open	Tournament Not Held				LQ	2R	LQ
British Open	Not Held		1R	LQ	LQ	3R	1R
English Open	1R	2R	WD	1R	LQ	2R	1R
Shenzhen Open (Note: The event was called the Xi'an Grand Prix (2024/2025–2025/2026))	Tournament Not Held				LQ	LQ	1R
Northern Ireland Open	2R	1R	LQ	LQ	3R	1R	1R
International Championship	LQ	Not Held			LQ	2R	1R
UK Championship	1R	1R	1R	LQ	1R	1R	
Shoot Out	3R	1R	2R	1R	1R	WD	
Scottish Open	1R	2R	2R	LQ	W	2R	
German Masters	LQ	LQ	LQ	LQ	LQ	LQ	LQ
Welsh Open	1R	1R	LQ	LQ	LQ	1R	
World Grand Prix	DNQ	DNQ	DNQ	DNQ	2R	DNQ	
Players Championship	DNQ	DNQ	DNQ	DNQ	1R	DNQ	
World Open	LQ	Not Held			1R	1R	
Tour Championship	DNQ	DNQ	DNQ	DNQ	DNQ	DNQ	
World Championship	A	LQ	LQ	LQ	2R	1R	
Non-ranking tournaments
Shanghai Masters	A	Not Held			A	1R	1R
Champion of Champions	A	A	A	A	A	QF	
Championship League	A	A	A	A	A	RR	
Former ranking tournaments
Riga Masters	LQ	Tournament Not Held					
China Championship	LQ	Tournament Not Held					
WST Pro Series	NH	RR	Tournament Not Held				
Turkish Masters	Not Held		LQ	Tournament Not Held			
Gibraltar Open	2R	3R	1R	Tournament Not Held			
European Masters	LQ	1R	LQ	WD	Not Held		
WST Classic	Not Held			1R	Not Held		
Saudi Arabia Masters	Tournament Not Held				5R	3R	NH
Former non-ranking tournaments
Six-red World Championship	A	Not Held		LQ	Not Held		

Performance Table Legend
LQ	lost in the qualifying draw	#R	lost in the early rounds of the tournament (WR = Wildcard round, RR = Round robin)	QF	lost in the quarter-finals
SF	lost in the semi-finals	F	lost in the final	W	won the tournament
DNQ	did not qualify for the tournament	A	did not participate in the tournament	WD	withdrew from the tournament

NH / Not Held	means an event was not held.
NR / Non-Ranking Event	means an event is/was no longer a ranking event.
R / Ranking Event	means an event is/was a ranking event.
MR / Minor-Ranking Event	means an event is/was a minor-ranking event.

== Career finals ==
=== Ranking finals: 1 (1 title) ===
Outcome	No.	Year	Championship	Opponent in the final	Score
Winner	1.	2024	Scottish Open	(China) Wu Yize	9–5

=== Amateur finals: 4 (2 titles) ===
Outcome	No.	Year	Championship	Opponent in the final	Score
Runner-up	1.	2017	World Under-18 Championship	(Pakistan) Muhammad Naseem Akhtar	3–5
Runner-up	2.	2018	World Under-18 Championship	(China) He Guoqiang	4–5
Winner	1.	2024	Asia Pacific Under-21 Championship	(Australia) Jayden Dinga	5–3
Winner	2.	2024	Asia Pacific Championship	(Australia) Vinnie Calabrese	6–5
