= 2025 World Grand Prix (snooker) =

Snooker tournament

Tournament information
- Dates: 4–9 March 2025
- Venue: Kai Tak Arena, Hong Kong
- Organisation: World Snooker Tour
- Format: Ranking event
- Total prize fund: £700,000
- Winner's share: £180,000
- Highest break: Judd Trump (ENG) (146)

Final
- Champion: Neil Robertson (AUS)
- Runner-up: Stuart Bingham (ENG)
- Score: 10–0

The 2025 World Grand Prix was a professional snooker tournament that took place from 4 to 9 March 2025 at the Kai Tak Arena, Hong Kong. The 15th ranking event of the 2024‍–‍25 season, it followed the 2025 World Open and preceded the 2025 Players Championship. It was the first of three events in the Players Series, preceding the 2025 Players Championship and the 2025 Tour Championship. The event was broadcast by Now TV, ViuTV and ViuTVsix domestically and by other broadcasters worldwide. The winner received £180,000 from a total prize fund of £700,000. Staged in Hong Kong for the first time in its history, the tournament was the first professional ranking snooker tournament held in the territory since the 1989 Hong Kong Open.

The event featured the top 32 players on the one-year ranking list as it stood after the 2025 Welsh Open. Ronnie O'Sullivan, who had defeated Judd Trump 10‍–‍7 in the 2024 final, withdrew prior to the tournament on medical grounds. Hossein Vafaei, who was ranked 33rd on the one-year list after the Welsh Open, replaced O'Sullivan in the draw.

Neil Robertson won the tournament, defeating Stuart Bingham 10‍–‍0 in the final to secure his second World Grand Prix title and the 25th ranking title of his career. It was the fourth time a player had won a two-session ranking final by a whitewash, and only the second time by a 10‍–‍0 scoreline, following the 1989 Grand Prix, where Steve Davis defeated Dean Reynolds. The other two-session ranking final whitewashes had occurred at the 2020 European Masters, where Robertson defeated Zhou Yuelong, and the 2022 German Masters, where Zhao Xintong defeated Yan Bingtao, both by 9‍–‍0 scorelines. A total of 42 century breaks were made during the event, the highest being a 146 by Trump.

== Overview ==
The event took place from 4 to 9 March 2025 at the Kai Tak Arena, Hong Kong. The fifteenth ranking event of the 2024‍–‍25 season, following the 2025 World Open, it was the first of three events in the Players Series, preceding the 2025 Players Championship and 2025 Tour Championship. Qualification for the Players Series is based on the one-year ranking list of the ongoing season, with the top 32 ranked players qualifying for the World Grand Prix. The event was introduced as a non-ranking invitational tournament in 2015 but has been held as a ranking event since 2016. This was the first time the event was held outside the United Kingdom and the first time that a ranking event was held in Hong Kong since the 1989 Hong Kong Open.

Ronnie O'Sullivan won the previous event in 2024, defeating Judd Trump 10‍–‍7 in the final.

=== Format ===
The last-32 and last-16 matches were played as the best of seven frames; the quarter-finals were the best of nine frames; the semi-finals were the best of 11 frames, and the final was the best of 19 frames, played over two sessions.

=== Broadcasters ===
Domestically, the event was broadcast in Hong Kong by Now TV as well as by ViuTVsix (channel 96) for the quarter and semi finals and by ViuTV (channel 99) for the final. In the United Kingdom and Ireland, it was broadcast by TNT Sports 3 as well as by Discovery+ in the UK. In mainland Europe, the event was broadcast by Eurosport as well as by Discovery+ in Germany, Italy and Austria and Max in all other markets. It was broadcast by Huya Live, Migu, the CBSA-WPBSA Academy WeChat channel and the CBSA-WPBSA Academy Douyin in mainland China; Astro SuperSport in Malaysia and Brunei; TAP in the Philippines; Sportcast in Taiwan; TrueVisions in Thailand; Sportstars and Vision+ in Indonesia; and by WST Play in all other territories.

=== Seeding list ===
Unlike other events where the defending champion is seeded first, the reigning World Champion second, and the rest based on the world rankings, the qualification and seedings in the Players Series tournaments are determined by the one-year ranking list. Ronnie O'Sullivan and Stephen Maguire, ranked 24th and 23rd respectively on the one-year list after the cut-off point of the 2025 Welsh Open, withdrew before the tournament on medical grounds. O'Sullivan was replaced by Hossein Vafaei, ranked 33rd, and Maguire was replaced by Ben Woollaston, ranked 34th. The below list shows the top 34 players with the most ranking points acquired during the 2024‍–‍25 season, as of after the Welsh Open:

Seed	Player	Points
1	Judd Trump (ENG)	949,200
2	Kyren Wilson (ENG)	517,800
3	Xiao Guodong (CHN)	281,500
4	Mark Selby (ENG)	260,000
5	Mark Williams (WAL)	255,600
6	Neil Robertson (AUS)	227,050
7	Barry Hawkins (ENG)	224,550
8	Ding Junhui (CHN)	211,000
9	Si Jiahui (CHN)	209,200
10	Shaun Murphy (ENG)	200,900
11	Chris Wakelin (ENG)	184,400
12	Wu Yize (CHN)	181,600
13	Mark Allen (NIR)	148,400
14	Lei Peifan (CHN)	141,000
15	John Higgins (SCO)	138,750
16	Jack Lisowski (ENG)	121,600

Seed	Player	Points
17	Zhang Anda (CHN)	117,550
18	Ali Carter (ENG)	110,800
19	Elliot Slessor (ENG)	107,250
20	Jimmy Robertson (ENG)	102,600
21	Pang Junxu (CHN)	102,400
22	David Gilbert (ENG)	97,150
~~23~~	~~Stephen Maguire (SCO)~~ (Note: Ben Woollaston replaced Stephen Maguire who withdrew on medical grounds before the start of the tournament.)	~~95,750~~
~~24~~	~~Ronnie O'Sullivan (ENG)~~ (Note: Hossein Vafaei replaced Ronnie O'Sullivan who withdrew on medical grounds before the start of the tournament.)	~~94,500~~
25	Xu Si (CHN)	92,050
26	Tom Ford (ENG)	91,950
27	Yuan Sijun (CHN)	91,600
28	Stuart Bingham (ENG)	89,400
29	Jackson Page (WAL)	89,300
30	Jak Jones (WAL)	75,300
31	Matthew Selt (ENG)	73,250
32	Gary Wilson (ENG)	72,400
	Hossein Vafaei (IRN)	69,800
	Ben Woollaston (ENG)	67,900

=== Prize fund ===
The event featured a total prize fund of £700,000, an increase of £320,000 from the previous event, with the winner receiving £180,000. The breakdown of prize money for the event is shown below:

- Winner: £180,000
- Runner-up: £80,000
- Semi-final: £35,000
- Quarter-final: £20,000
- Last 16: £15,000
- Last 32: £10,000
- Highest break: £10,000
- Total: £700,000

== Summary ==
=== Last 32 ===
The last-32 matches were played on 4 and 5 March as the best of 7 frames.

In the afternoon session on 4 March Shaun Murphy made a 110 break in the deciding frame to beat Ben Woollaston 4‍–‍3, Jack Lisowski defeated Zhang Anda 4‍–‍2, Stuart Bingham beat Mark Williams, also by 4‍–‍2, and David Gilbert beat Chris Wakelin 4‍–‍3. In the evening session Judd Trump beat Gary Wilson 4‍–‍2, and John Higgins beat Ali Carter 4‍–‍3, although Carter made two century breaks in frames two and four. Kyren Wilson recovered from 2‍–‍3 down to beat Matthew Selt 4‍–‍3, and Wu Yize whitewashed Pang Junxu.

In the afternoon session on 5 March Mark Selby beat Jackson Page 4‍–‍3, and Xiao Guodong beat Jak Jones, also by 4‍–‍3. Neil Robertson whitewashed Yuan Sijun, and Lei Peifan beat Elliot Slessor 4‍–‍2. In the evening session Barry Hawkins beat Tom Ford 4‍–‍1, and Xu Si beat Ding Junhui 4‍–‍3. Jimmy Robertson recovered from 0‍–‍2 down to defeat Mark Allen 4‍–‍2, and Hossein Vafaei beat Si Jiahui 4‍–‍3.

=== Last 16 ===
The last-16 matches were played on 6 March as the best of 7 frames. Jack Lisowski was due to play Judd Trump in the last-16 but he withdrew and so Trump was given a walkover to the quarter-finals. Trump reached his 100th ranking quarter-final.

In the afternoon session John Higgins beat Kyren Wilson 4‍–‍2, making two century breaks including a 143 in the second frame. Making his 147th ranking quarter-final, Higgins set a new record, overtaking that of Ronnie O'Sullivan. Stuart Bingham beat Wu Yize, also by 4‍–‍2, although Wu made two century breaks, and Neil Robertson beat David Gilbert 4‍–‍1.

In the evening session Shaun Murphy beat Barry Hawkins 4‍–‍1. Hossein Vafaei beat Xu Si 4‍–‍3, winning the sixth frame on the final black and then taking the deciding frame on the last pink. Mark Selby beat Jimmy Robertson 4‍–‍2, and Xiao Guodong beat Lei Peifan 4‍–‍3, making breaks of 117, 128, and another 128 in the final frame. Selby reached his 100th ranking quarter-final.

=== Quarter-finals ===
The quarter-finals were played on 7 March as the best of 9 frames.

In the afternoon session Neil Robertson beat Xiao Guodong 5‍–‍3. After the match Robertson said: "At 3‍–‍1 down I regrouped and came out strong, the only disappointing thing was missing the 147 chance [in frame five] because it would have been great to make one here. But I'm really pleased with the way I finished the match." Shaun Murphy beat John Higgins 5‍–‍3, making breaks of 143 and 112. After the match Murphy said: "It's always tough against John [Higgins], especially just after he has won a massive tournament and got that renewed sense of purpose. It was played in good spirits as it always is with John. It's an honour to share the stage with him, I have always looked up to him and he has been teaching me since I was a teenager."

In the evening session Judd Trump whitewashed Hossein Vafaei in just 64 minutes, making breaks of 145, 108, 115 and 146. The 146 break in the final frame was the highest of the tournament at that point. After the match Trump said: "I settled down straight away and played with confidence, Hossein [Vafaei] missed one or two balls but I played solid and scored very well. It's nice to have the crowd getting behind me and cheering for me. I'm proud to have been given the opportunity to represent them because I have always been an advocate for Hong Kong and I love it here." Stuart Bingham made a 116 break in the first frame against Mark Selby, and then recovered from 2‍–‍4 down to beat Selby 5‍–‍4. After the match Bingham said: "I was fighting against myself, jabbing all over the place. That has crept into my game this season, I have no pause [on the backswing of the cue action]. Luckily the balls still went in and it was a great win. I had the same a few years ago, then it disappeared, and it has come back this season. It's hard to take anything from that game, though I should be elated to reach the semis."

=== Semi-finals ===
The semi-finals were played on 8 March as the best of 11 frames.

In the afternoon session Neil Robertson recovered from 3‍–‍5 down to take the last three frames and beat Shaun Murphy 6‍–‍5, making three century breaks. After the match Robertson said: "It was a brilliant match. I started off so well. I missed a couple of difficult pots, but other than that I didn't do too much wrong. Shaun [Murphy] played really well. He was very aggressive, potting some brilliant balls to get in and create frame winning opportunities. It's easier to stay in the match when you haven't done much wrong. Full complements to Shaun, he said after the match that there wasn't anything he could do about that long red I potted in the last frame. It was an unbelievable shot to create the match winning visit."

In the evening session Stuart Bingham beat Judd Trump 6‍–‍3. After the match Bingham said: "I'm over the moon. I had a little tear there at the table, because it has been a long time. It has been hard. Without a doubt, I've wondered if I ever would get back in a ranking final. The last few years haven't been good on my part. I've been searching and trying things. This week it has clicked for me. I've got through matches without feeling the best, but now I'm in the final."

=== Final ===
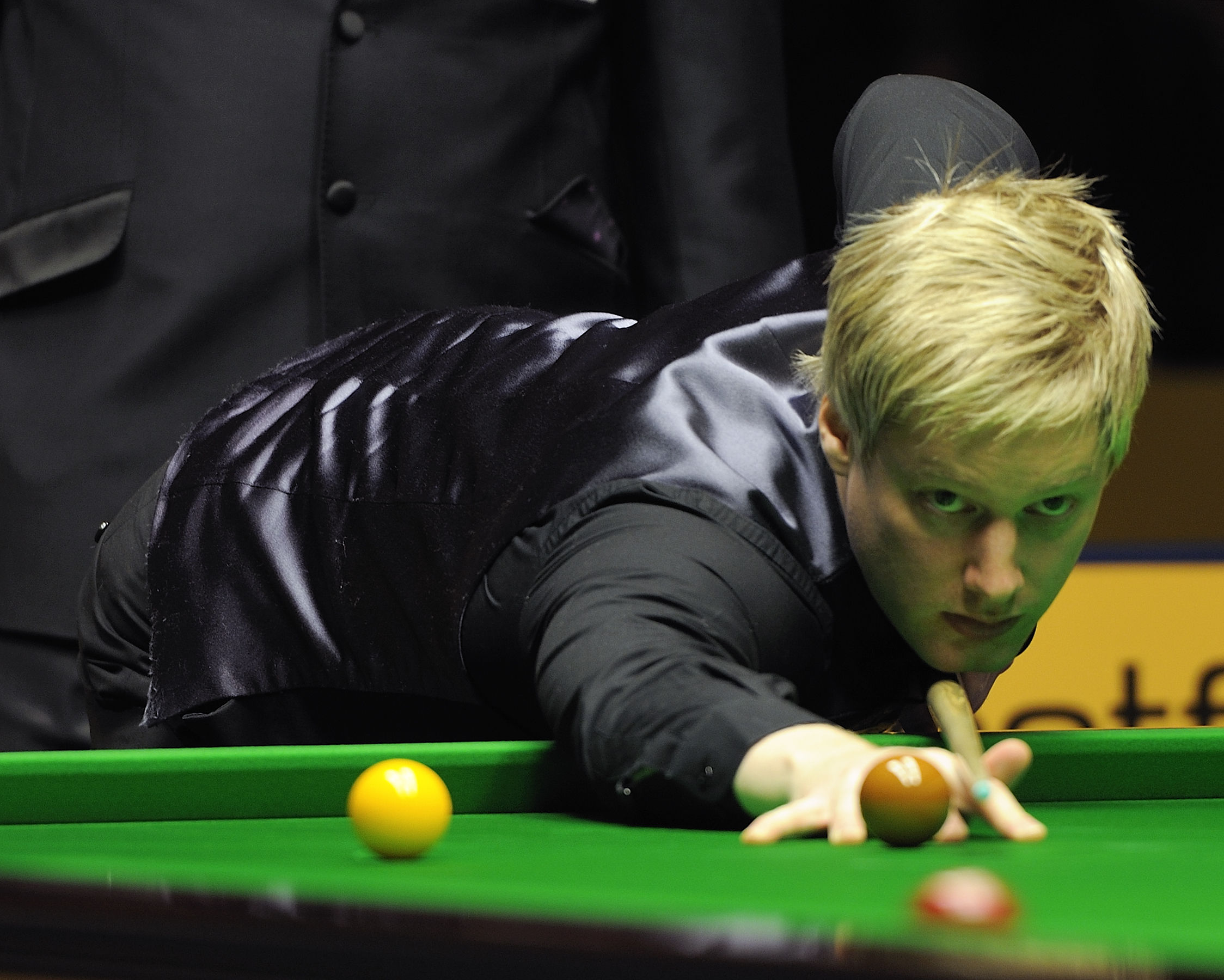
Neil Robertson (pictured) won the tournament, beating Stuart Bingham 10‍–‍0.

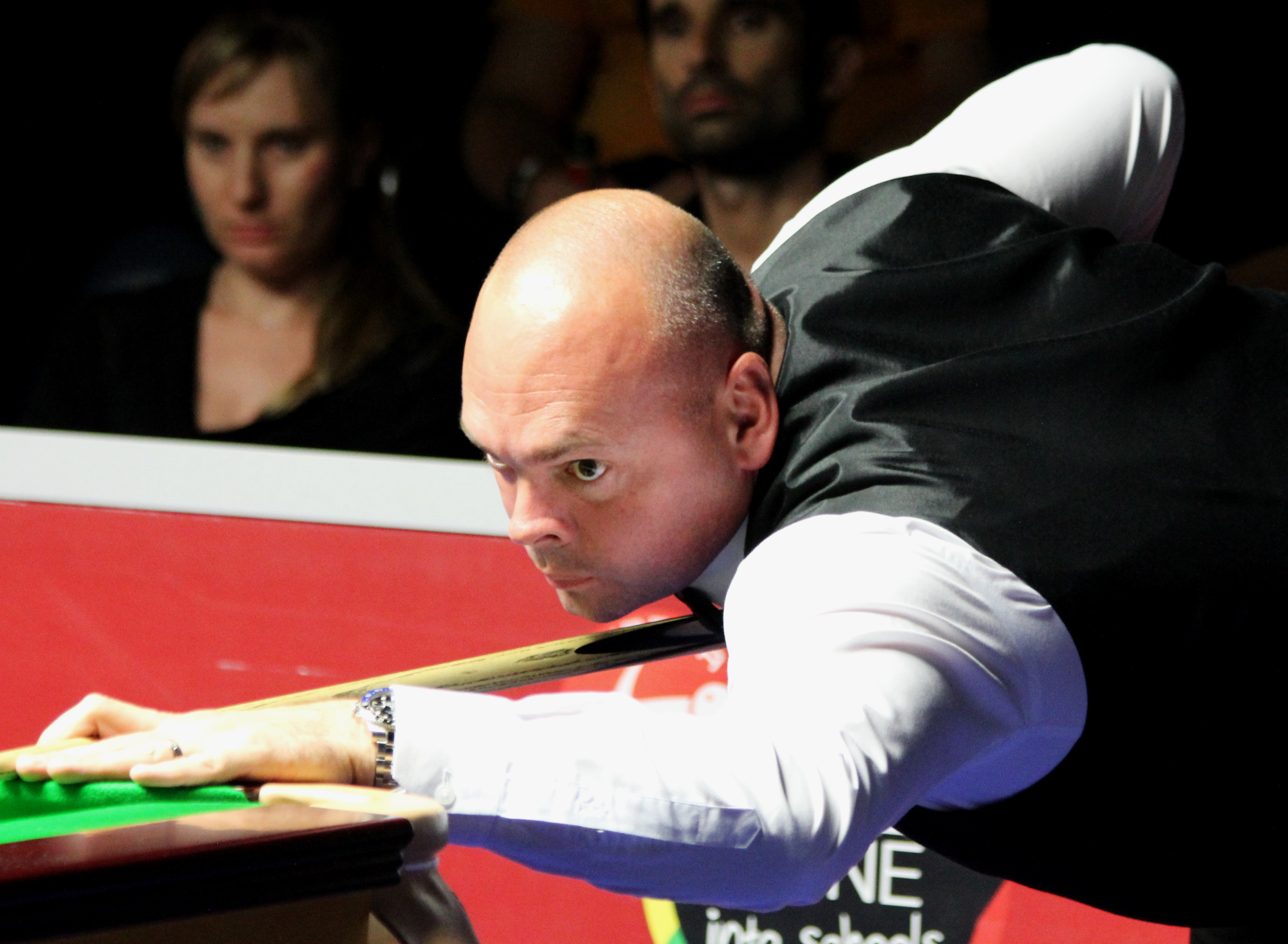
Stuart Bingham (pictured) was playing in his 12th ranking event final.

The final was played on 9 March as the best of 19 frames, played over two sessions. Neil Robertson, contesting his 38th ranking final, faced Stuart Bingham, who was playing in his 12th.

At the end of the afternoon session Robertson led Bingham 8‍–‍0, making a 104 break in the second frame. Robertson won the match and the tournament 10‍–‍0, becoming the first player in snooker history to complete two whitewash wins in major ranking finals, as he had beaten Zhou Yuelong 9‍–‍0 in the 2020 European Masters. After the match Robertson said: "It is very rare to win by a whitewash in a final. It certainly wasn't what I expected coming into the match today. I started brilliantly in the first four frames and after that I was able to capitalise on some mistakes from Stuart [Bingham]. I think both players knew the writing was on the wall at six or seven nil. Going into tonight I wanted to do my best to win 10‍–‍0. I feel for Stuart, as he is a great guy and we get along well." Bingham said: "It was going to be an uphill struggle tonight. It was just one of those days where it didn't happen. I've been there and got the T-shirt a few times. What has happened this week has shown that it is a game of snooker and there are more important things in life. You have to take the rough with the smooth." The result moved Robertson up from 19th to 11th in the world rankings, and Bingham from 23rd to 20th.

== Tournament draw ==
The draw for the tournament is shown below. Numbers in parentheses after the players' names denote the players' seedings, and players in bold denote match winners.

**Last 32**; Best of 7 frames
**Judd Trump (ENG) (1)**	**4**
Gary Wilson (ENG) (32)	2
**Jack Lisowski (ENG) (16)**	**4**
Zhang Anda (CHN) (17)	2
Si Jiahui (CHN) (9)	3
**Hossein Vafaei (IRN)**	**4**
Ding Junhui (CHN) (8)	3
**Xu Si (CHN) (25)**	**4**
Mark Williams (WAL) (5)	2
**Stuart Bingham (ENG) (28)**	**4**
**Wu Yize (CHN) (12)**	**4**
Pang Junxu (CHN) (21)	0
Mark Allen (NIR) (13)	2
**Jimmy Robertson (ENG) (20)**	**4**
**Mark Selby (ENG) (4)**	**4**
Jackson Page (WAL) (29)	3
**Xiao Guodong (CHN) (3)**	**4**
Jak Jones (WAL) (30)	3
**Lei Peifan (CHN) (14)**	**4**
Elliot Slessor (ENG) (19)	2
Chris Wakelin (ENG) (11)	3
**David Gilbert (ENG) (22)**	**4**
**Neil Robertson (AUS) (6)**	**4**
Yuan Sijun (CHN) (27)	0
**Barry Hawkins (ENG) (7)**	**4**
Tom Ford (ENG) (26)	1
**Shaun Murphy (ENG) (10)**	**4**
Ben Woollaston (ENG)	3
**John Higgins (SCO) (15)**	**4**
Ali Carter (ENG) (18)	3
**Kyren Wilson (ENG) (2)**	**4**
Matthew Selt (ENG) (31)	3

**Last 16**; Best of 7 frames
**(England) Judd Trump (1)**	**w/o**
(England) Jack Lisowski (16) (Note: Jack Lisowski withdrew and so Judd Trump was given a walkover to the quarter-finals.)	w/d
**(Iran) Hossein Vafaei**	**4**
(China) Xu Si (25)	3
**(England) Stuart Bingham (28)**	**4**
(China) Wu Yize (12)	2
(England) Jimmy Robertson (20)	2
**(England) Mark Selby (4)**	**4**
**(China) Xiao Guodong (3)**	**4**
(China) Lei Peifan (14)	3
(England) David Gilbert (22)	1
**(Australia) Neil Robertson (6)**	**4**
(England) Barry Hawkins (7)	1
**(England) Shaun Murphy (10)**	**4**
**(Scotland) John Higgins (15)**	**4**
(England) Kyren Wilson (2)	2

**Quarter-finals**; Best of 9 frames
**(England) Judd Trump (1)**	**5**
(Iran) Hossein Vafaei	0
**(England) Stuart Bingham (28)**	**5**
(England) Mark Selby (4)	4
(China) Xiao Guodong (3)	3
**(Australia) Neil Robertson (6)**	**5**
**(England) Shaun Murphy (10)**	**5**
(Scotland) John Higgins (15)	3

**Semi-finals**; Best of 11 frames
(England) Judd Trump (1)	3
**(England) Stuart Bingham (28)**	**6**
**(Australia) Neil Robertson (6)**	**6**
(England) Shaun Murphy (10)	5

**Final**; Best of 19 frames
(England) Stuart Bingham (28)	0
**(Australia) Neil Robertson (6)**	**10**

Note: w/d=withdrawn; w/o=walkover

=== Final ===
Final: Best of 19 frames. Referee: Zhu Ying; Kai Tak Arena, Kowloon City, Hong Kong, 9 March 2025
Stuart Bingham (28); England	0–**10**	**Neil Robertson** (6); Australia
Afternoon: 0–**121**, 18–**104** (104), 26–**113**, 16–**86**, 44–**57**, 57–**72**, 31–**78**, 63–**67**; Evening: 60–**69**, 27–**69**
(frame 8) 63	Highest break	**104** (frame 2)
0	Century breaks	**1**

== Century breaks ==
A total of 42 century breaks were made in the tournament.

- 146, 145, 142, 124, 115, 108, 106 – Judd Trump
- 143, 112, 110, 107 – Shaun Murphy
- 143, 100 – John Higgins
- 137, 120 – Ali Carter
- 133, 131, 111 – Kyren Wilson
- 129, 120, 111 – Wu Yize
- 128, 128, 117, 110, 106 – Xiao Guodong
- 126, 105 – Barry Hawkins
- 118 – Matthew Selt
- 116, 108, 104, 100 – Stuart Bingham
- 114, 114, 104, 104, 101 – Neil Robertson
- 112 – Zhang Anda
- 108 – Ding Junhui
- 107 – Lei Peifan
- 102 – Mark Selby
