= 2025 Players Championship (snooker) =

2025 Sportsbet.io Players Championship

Tournament information
- Dates: 17–23 March 2025
- Venue: Telford International Centre
- City: Telford
- Country: England
- Organisation: World Snooker Tour
- Format: Ranking event
- Total prize fund: £500,000
- Winner's share: £150,000
- Highest break: Judd Trump (ENG) (139); Mark Selby (ENG) (139)

Final
- Champion: Kyren Wilson (ENG)
- Runner-up: Judd Trump (ENG)
- Score: 10–9

The 2025 Players Championship (officially the 2025 Sportsbet.io Players Championship) was a professional snooker tournament that took place from 17 to 23 March 2025 at the Telford International Centre in Telford, England. The 16th ranking event of the 2024‍–‍25 season, following the 2025 World Grand Prix and preceding the 2025 Tour Championship, it was the second of three events in the Players Series. Organised by the World Snooker Tour and sponsored by the crypto betting firm Sportsbet.io, the event was broadcast by ITV and ITVX domestically, by Eurosport and Discovery+ in Europe, and by other broadcasters worldwide. The winner received £150,000 from a total prize fund of £500,000.

The event featured the top 16 players on the one-year ranking list as it stood after the World Grand Prix. Mark Allen was the defending champion, having defeated Zhang Anda 10‍–‍8 in the final of the previous year's event, but he lost 3‍–‍6 to Kyren Wilson in the first round. Wilson won the tournament, defeating Judd Trump 10‍–‍9 in the final to secure his first Players Championship title and the 10th ranking title of his career. It was the third time Wilson had beaten Trump in a ranking final that season, following his wins at the 2024 Xi'an Grand Prix and the 2024 Northern Ireland Open. The event produced a total of 23 century breaks. Trump and Mark Selby both made breaks of 139, the highest of the tournament.

== Format ==
The event took place from 17 to 23 March 2025 at the Telford International Centre in Telford, England. It featured the top 16 players on the one-year ranking list as it stood after the 2025 World Grand Prix.

The matches were played as the best of 11 frames until the final, which was the best of 19 frames, played over two sessions.

=== Broadcasters ===
The event was broadcast by ITV and ITVX in the United Kingdom; TNT Sports in Ireland; Eurosport and Discovery+ in Europe (excluding the United Kingdom and Ireland); Liaoning TV, Migu, and Huya in mainland China; Now TV in Hong Kong; Astro SuperSport in Malaysia and Brunei; TrueVisions in Thailand; Sportcast in Taiwan; Premier Sports Network in the Philippines; and WST Play in all other territories.

=== Prize fund ===
The event featured a prize pool of £500,000 with the winner receiving £150,000, a 30% increase in prize money compared to the previous year's edition. The breakdown of prize money for the event is shown below:

- Winner: £150,000
- Runner-up: £70,000
- Semi-final: £35,000
- Quarter-final: £20,000
- Last 16: £15,000
- Highest break: £10,000
- Total: £500,000

=== Seeding list ===
Unlike other events, where the defending champion was seeded first, the reigning World Champion second, and the remaining seedings based on the world rankings, eligibility for and seedings in the Players Series tournaments are determined by the one-year ranking list. The below list shows the top-16 players with the most ranking points acquired during the 2024‍–‍25 season, after the 2025 World Grand Prix:

Seed	Player	Points
1	Judd Trump (ENG)	993,200
2	Kyren Wilson (ENG)	541,800
3	Neil Robertson (AUS)	407,050
4	John Higgins (SCO)	333,750
5	Xiao Guodong (CHN)	306,500
6	Mark Selby (ENG)	285,000
7	Mark Williams (WAL)	265,600
8	Barry Hawkins (ENG)	261,550

Seed	Player	Points
9	Shaun Murphy (ENG)	257,900
10	Ding Junhui (CHN)	235,000
11	Si Jiahui (CHN)	219,200
12	Wu Yize (CHN)	205,600
13	Chris Wakelin (ENG)	194,000
14	Stuart Bingham (ENG)	169,400
15	Mark Allen (NIR)	163,400
16	Lei Peifan (CHN)	161,000

== Summary ==
=== First round ===
The first-round matches were played from 17 to 19 March as the best of 11 frames. Current world champion Kyren Wilson played the defending champion Mark Allen, in which Allen produced a 125 break in the second frame, but Wilson went on to win the match 6‍‍–‍3. Mark Williams beat Ding Junhui 6‍‍–‍2. Having defeated Ding, Williams faced the "Ding Junhui curse" playing Wilson in the quarter-finals. The "curse" was that in all the matches that Ding had lost this season, the player who beat him had lost in the next round.

Neil Robertson played Stuart Bingham on 18 March. When the draw for the tournament was announced shortly after a whitewash for Robertson over Bingham in the 2025 World Grand Prix final, it was dubbed by the press that Bingham was "handed the chance for revenge on Neil Robertson that he wanted." Robertson defeated Bingham 6‍–‍4, and Mark Selby beat Si Jiahui 6‍–‍3 making breaks of 128 and 132. Shaun Murphy beat Barry Hawkins 6‍–‍4, and Judd Trump defeated Lei Peifan 6‍–‍2 making breaks of 114 and 139.

Xiao Guodong beat Wu Yize, and John Higgins beat Chris Wakelin, both matches by a score of 6‍–‍5, with both Wu and Wakelin making century breaks while Xiao and Higgins did not.

=== Quarter-finals ===
The quarter-finals were played from 19 to 21 March as the best of 11 frames.

Wilson beat Williams 6‍–‍3, so that the "Ding Junhui curse" continued. Williams spoke about his deteriorating eyesight in a post-match interview, citing it as one of the main reasons that had affected his performance during the tournament.

Robertson beat Selby 6‍–‍3, although Selby made the only century break of the match, a 139 in the second frame. Trump whitewashed Murphy in a match taking only one hour and 26 minutes, and making a 101 break in the third frame.

Higgins recovered from 2‍–‍5 down to beat Xiao 6‍–‍5, although Xiao made two century breaks.

=== Semi-finals ===
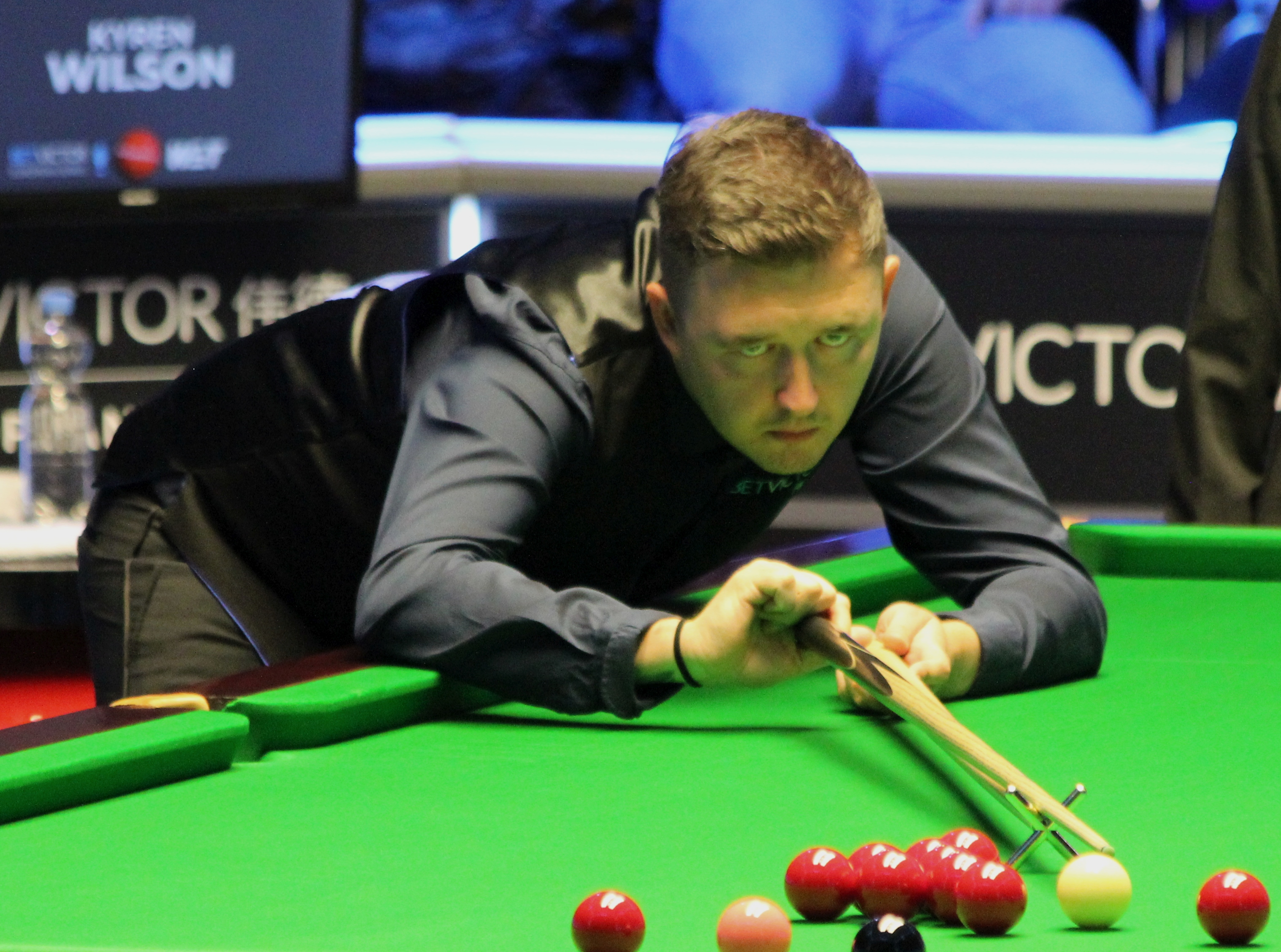
Kyren Wilson (pictured) beat Neil Robertson 6‍–‍5 in the first semi-final.

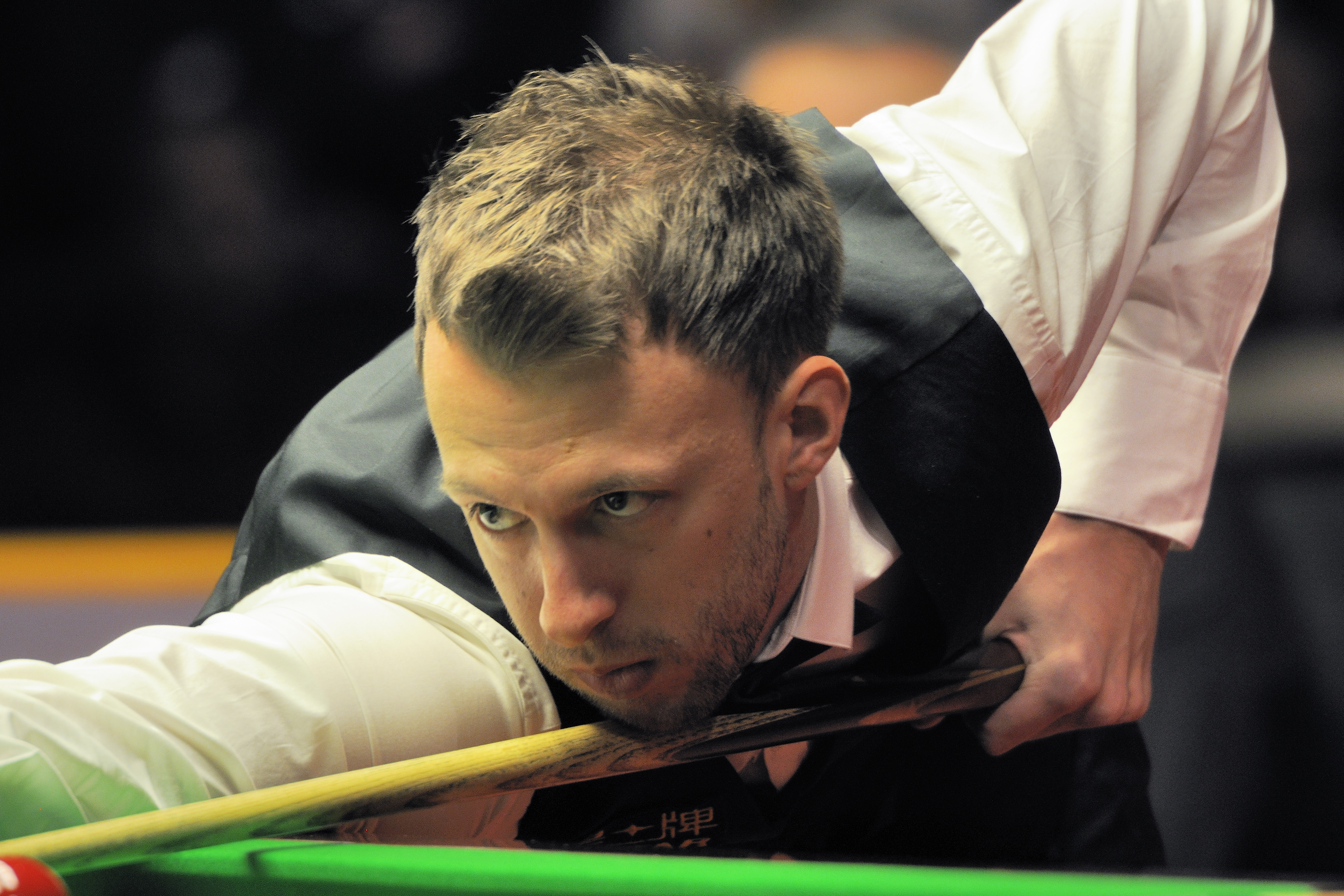
Judd Trump (pictured) beat John Higgins 6‍–‍4 in the second semi-final.

The semi-finals were played on 21 and 22 March as the best of 11 frames. The four semi-finalists being the top four seeds in the tournament.

Wilson recovered from 1‍–‍4 down to beat Robertson 6‍–‍5, making two century breaks, including a 134 break in the deciding frame. After the match Wilson said: "It is great to make a final of one of these tournaments. The field this week has been so strong. Of the eight quarter-finalists, seven were World Champions. That just shows the standard. I'm so proud that I've managed to get to the final. I feel like I dominated most of the matches with Mark Allen and Mark Williams in the first two rounds. They are both great players. I just got off to a slow start against Neil [Robertson] and allowed him to get into his stride."

In the second semi-final Trump defeated Higgins 6‍–‍4, making two century breaks. After the match Trump said: "I feel that at the start of my career it was the other way around [against Higgins ]. He was making incredible clearances to beat me. It is nice to turn it around. I'm obviously confident to beat him. It is probably in the back of his head that he hasn't beaten me for a while, but I still have to go out there and do it. I need to play near my best every time."

=== Final ===
The final took place on 23 March as the best of 19 frames, played over two sessions, between Wilson and Trump. Trump contested his 49th ranking final, while Kyren Wilson played in his 18th. It was Wilson's first Players Championship final and Trump's third; Trump had previously won the title in 2017 and 2019.

At the end of the afternoon session, the scores were tied at 4‍–‍4. In the evening session, Trump won frame nine, but Wilson then took four consecutive frames for an 8‍–‍5 lead. Trump won the next two frames, reducing his deficit to one at 8‍–‍7. Frame 16 came down to a safety battle on the last pink; Wilson potted the pink and black to move one from victory at 9‍–‍7. Trump then produced breaks of 78 and 103, the only century of the final, to tie the scores at 9‍–‍9 and force a deciding frame. Both players had scoring opportunities in the decider, but Wilson won the frame and match with a 36 break after Trump missed a pot on a long red. Wilson's 10‍–‍9 victory gave him his first Players Championship title and the 10th ranking title of his career. It was the third time that season Wilson had beaten Trump in a ranking final, following his wins at the 2024 Xi'an Grand Prix and the 2024 Northern Ireland Open. Wilson commented afterwards: "I know what a competitor Judd Trump is. He will go away and be hungry to put it right next time we play. That is what spurs me on to keep practising and performing at the highest level. It is a really healthy rivalry for not just me and Judd [Trump], but snooker as a whole." Trump commented: "We weren't able to play our best, but there was some drama in the decider. Well done to Kyren [Wilson] and his family. I want to thank everyone for coming out to support us. It has been a great event."

Following the conclusion of the tournament, the world rankings were updated with no change to the top five (Trump, Wilson, Selby, O'Sullivan, and Williams). Higgins moved up to sixth place due to his reaching the semi-finals, and Robertson moved ahead of Murphy into tenth place.

== Tournament draw ==
Numbers in parentheses after the players' names denote the players' seedings, and players in bold denote match winners. All matches were played as the best of 11 frames except the final, which was played as the best of 19 frames.

**First round** Best of 11 frames
**Judd Trump (ENG) (1)**	**6**
Lei Peifan (CHN) (16)	2
Barry Hawkins (ENG) (8)	4
**Shaun Murphy (ENG) (9)**	**6**
**Xiao Guodong (CHN) (5)**	**6**
Wu Yize (CHN) (12)	5
**John Higgins (SCO) (4)**	**6**
Chris Wakelin (ENG) (13)	5
**Neil Robertson (AUS) (3)**	**6**
Stuart Bingham (ENG) (14)	4
**Mark Selby (ENG) (6)**	**6**
Si Jiahui (CHN) (11)	3
**Mark Williams (WAL) (7)**	**6**
Ding Junhui (CHN) (10)	2
**Kyren Wilson (ENG) (2)**	**6**
Mark Allen (NIR) (15)	3

**Quarter-finals**; Best of 11 frames
**(England) Judd Trump (1)**	**6**
(England) Shaun Murphy (9)	0
(China) Xiao Guodong (5)	5
**(Scotland) John Higgins (4)**	**6**
**(Australia) Neil Robertson (3)**	**6**
(England) Mark Selby (6)	3
(Wales) Mark Williams (7)	3
**(England) Kyren Wilson (2)**	**6**

**Semi-finals**; Best of 11 frames
**(England) Judd Trump (1)**	**6**
(Scotland) John Higgins (4)	4
(Australia) Neil Robertson (3)	5
**(England) Kyren Wilson (2)**	**6**

**Final**; Best of 19 frames
(England) Judd Trump (1)	9
**(England) Kyren Wilson (2)**	**10**

=== Final ===
Final
Final: Best of 19 frames. Referee: Leo Scullion; Telford International Centre, Telford, England, 23 March 2025.
Judd Trump (1); England	9–**10**	**Kyren Wilson** (2); England
Afternoon: **90**–0, **76**–14, 0–**108**, 0–**81**, **79**–16, 59–**64**, 0–**74**, **71**–28; Evening: **62**–39, 46–**85**, 52–**72**, 31–**74**, 65–**70**, **72**–17, **73**–5, 50–**59**, **78**–0, **109**–14 (103), 30–**69**
(frame 18) **103**	Highest break	81 (frame 4)
**1**	Century breaks	0

== Century breaks ==
A total of 23 century breaks were made in the tournament.

- 139, 132, 128 – Mark Selby
- 139, 130, 126, 114, 103, 101 – Judd Trump
- 134, 116 – Kyren Wilson
- 131, 104 – Wu Yize
- 129 – Chris Wakelin
- 125 – Mark Allen
- 123 – Shaun Murphy
- 112 – Stuart Bingham
- 111, 104 – Xiao Guodong
- 108 – Barry Hawkins
- 107 – John Higgins
- 102 – Lei Peifan
- 100 – Neil Robertson
