= 2025 World Open (snooker) =

Snooker tournament held in China

2025 Weide Cup World Open

Tournament information
- Dates: 23 February – 1 March 2025
- Venue: Yushan Sport Centre
- City: Yushan
- Country: China
- Organisation: World Snooker Tour
- Format: Ranking event
- Total prize fund: £825,000
- Winner's share: £175,000
- Highest break: Shaun Murphy (ENG) (147)

Final
- Champion: John Higgins (SCO)
- Runner-up: Joe O'Connor (ENG)
- Score: 10–6

The 2025 World Open (officially the 2025 Weide Cup World Open) was a professional snooker tournament that took place from 23 February to 1 March 2025 at the Yushan Sport Centre in Yushan, China. Qualifiers took place from 20 to 22 December 2024 at the Ponds Forge International Sports Centre in Sheffield, England. The 14th ranking event of the 2024‍–‍25 season, it followed the 2025 Welsh Open and preceded the 2025 World Grand Prix. The winner received £175,000 from a total prize fund of £825,000.

Judd Trump was the defending champion, having defeated Ding Junhui 10‍–‍4 in the final of the 2024 event, but he lost 2‍–‍5 to Joe O'Connor in the last 32. John Higgins won the tournament, defeating O'Connor 10‍–‍6 in the final to claim the 32nd ranking title of his career and his first since the 2021 Players Championship four years earlier. Aged 49 years and 287 days, he became the second-oldest ranking event winner, after Ray Reardon, who was aged 50 years and 14 days when he won the 1982 Professional Players Tournament. Higgins also set a new record for the longest interval between a player's first and most recent ranking title, his victory coming 30 years and 129 days after his maiden ranking title at the 1994 Grand Prix.

The event produced 136 century breaks, with 97 made during the main stage and 39 in the qualifying matches. The highest was a maximum break by Shaun Murphy in his last-64 match against Zhou Jinhao. It was the 10th maximum break of Murphy's professional career.

== Overview ==
The tournament took place from 23 February to 1 March 2025 at the Yushan Sport Centre in Yushan, China. The fourteenth ranking event of the 2024‍–‍25 season (following the 2025 Welsh Open and preceding the 2025 World Grand Prix), and the fifth and last major tournament of the season to be held in mainland China, the tournament was the sixth edition of the World Open since 2016. Originally created in 1982 as the Professional Players Tournament, the tournament was held in the UK as the Grand Prix and LG Cup from 1984 to 2009, and was renamed the World Open in 2010. China hosted the event from 2012 to 2014 in Haikou, and in Yushan since 2016.

Judd Trump was the two-time defending champion, having won the event in 2019 and again, after a five-year hiatus due to the COVID-19 pandemic, in 2024, defeating 2017 World Open champion Ding Junhui 10‍–‍4 in the final.

Jiangxi Weide Machinery Manufacturing Co., Ltd. was the lead sponsor of the event.

=== Format ===
Qualification for the tournament took place from 20 to 22 December 2024 at the Ponds Forge International Sports Centre in Sheffield, England. Qualifying matches involving defending champion Judd Trump, reigning World Champion Kyren Wilson, the two highest-ranked Chinese players (Ding Junhui and Zhang Anda), four Chinese wildcards (Zhou Jinhao, Cao Jin, Wang Yuhang, and Zou Pengfei); and Daniel Womersley (Note: Ronnie O'Sullivan withdrew and was replaced by Daniel Womersley.) were held over to be played at the main venue in Yushan.

All matches were played as the best of nine frames up to and including the quarter-finals. The semi-finals were the best of 11 frames and the final was a best of 19 frames match played over two sessions.

=== Broadcasters ===
The qualifying matches were broadcast domestically by Migu and Huya in China; by Discovery+ in Europe (including the United Kingdom and Ireland); and Matchroom.live in all other territories.

The main stage of the event was broadcast domestically by CCTV-5, Migu, and Huya in China; by Eurosport in mainland Europe as well as Discovery+ in Germany, Italy and Poland, and Max in all other European territories; Now TV in Hong Kong; True Sports in Thailand; Sportcast in Taiwan; Sportstars and Vision+ in Indonesia; and WST Play in all other territories.

As a result of the previously announced closure of Eurosport in the UK and Ireland on 28 February 2025, some linear channel sessions of the tournament in the region, including the semi-final and final, required a subscription for £30.99 per month for TNT Sports: the snooker was provided by TNT Sports 3. Although Discovery+ could be accessed in the same locations, the video on-demand service was also accessible only through a £30.99 per month subscription, if no access was provided free of charge to Discovery+ by a Pay TV service provider.

=== Prize fund ===
The breakdown of prize money for the event is shown below:

- Winner: £175,000
- Runner-up: £75,000
- Semi-final: £33,000
- Quarter-final: £22,000
- Last 16: £14,000
- Last 32: £9,000
- Last 64: £5,000
- Highest break: £5,000
- Total: £825,000

== Summary ==
=== Qualifying ===
On 20 December 2024 Barry Hawkins beat Cheung Ka Wai 5‍–‍1, Zak Surety whitewashed fourteenth seed Si Jiahui, and Chris Totten defeated Stuart Bingham 5‍–‍1. In the second frame Bingham made a 72 break before Totten replied with a 73 clearance to win on the final black.

On 21 December 2024 John Higgins beat Wang Yuchen 5‍–‍4, Lei Peifan recovered from 0‍–‍4 down to defeat Anthony Hamilton 5‍–‍4, and Jak Jones whitewashed Allan Taylor.

On 22 December 2024 Luca Brecel beat amateur Iulian Boiko 5‍–‍3, Sunny Akani defeated sixth seed Mark Williams 5‍–‍2, and Amir Sarkhosh beat David Gilbert 5‍–‍3, winning the eighth frame on the final black. Mark Selby made a 142 break in the deciding frame to beat Artemijs Žižins 5‍–‍4, and Mark Allen won the last two frames to beat Rory Thor 5‍–‍4.

=== Early rounds ===
Before the start of the tournament, it was announced that Ronnie O'Sullivan, Luca Brecel, Ricky Walden, Chris Totten, and Jak Jones had withdrawn. O'Sullivan was replaced by amateur player Daniel Womersley; and the other four players' opponents (Tian Pengfei, Ryan Day, Thepchaiya Un-Nooh, and Robbie Williams respectively) were given walkovers to the last-32.

==== Held over matches ====
The held-over qualifying matches were played on 23 February 2025 as the best of nine frames. Defending champion Judd Trump whitewashed Xing Zihao 5‍–‍0, making century breaks in the second and third frames. With the match lasting just 58 minutes and Xing only scoring 40 points, Trump said afterwards: "I'm very happy to play that well in my first match, in the first round you just want to get through as easily as possible." Ding Junhui beat compatriot Jiang Jun 5‍–‍1, also recording two century breaks of 141 and 130. Reigning World Champion Kyren Wilson defeated Hammad Miah 5‍–‍2, and 18-year-old Stan Moody beat Zhang Anda 5‍–‍3, making a high break of 123. Only one of the four Chinese amateur wildcards made it through to the last-64; as Zhou Jinhao defeated Sanderson Lam 5‍–‍1, making a break of 119 in the second frame.

==== Last 64 ====
The last-64 matches were played on 23 and 24 February 2025 as the best of nine frames. John Higgins beat Mark Davis 5‍–‍1, making two centuries in the match and saying afterwards: "He [Davis] didn't really show up today, but I played well." World number 61 Liu Hongyu defeated third seed Mark Selby 5‍–‍2, also compiling two century breaks in the match. Polish professional Antoni Kowalski beat Matthew Stevens 5‍–‍3, making a high break of 133, and after leading 3‍–‍1 at the mid-session interval, Wu Yize beat Jackson Page 5‍–‍4.

Shaun Murphy made the tenth 147 break of his career in the last frame of his whitewash victory over Chinese amateur player Zhou Jinhao. In the match Murphy also made the 700th century break of his career.

In a surprise early exit for 5th seed Mark Allen, he was defeated 4‍–‍5 by David Lilley (ranked 62) which Lilley described as his "best win ever". Judd Trump defeated Long Zehuang 5‍–‍1, making three century breaks in the match. Now having made 79 centuries in the season and WST offering a £100,000 bonus for the first player to make 100 centuries in the season, Trump commented: "Looking back I probably should have entered a few more tournaments because I didn't think I would get close to the bonus."

Duane Jones recovered from 0‍–‍4 down to beat Xiao Guodong 5‍–‍4, winning the decider with a 56-point clearance after being 1‍–‍54 behind. Jones said afterwards: "At first I was trying to make the score respectable, but then from 4‍–‍2 I wasn't far behind. ... From 4‍–‍0 down, 99 times out of 100 you lose, but you just never know. I played well and rode my luck." Kyren Wilson defeated Lei Peifan 5‍–‍1, and Stan Moody beat Graeme Dott 5‍–‍2. Barry Hawkins defeated Jamie Jones 5‍–‍2, and Ding Junhui beat Joe Perry 5‍–‍2, making breaks of 123 and 138.

==== Last 32 ====
The last-32 matches were played on 25 February 2025 as the best of nine frames. Defending champion Judd Trump was defeated for the first time in seven years in the World Open as he lost 2‍–‍5 to Joe O'Connor, and Shaun Murphy whitewashed Thepchaiya Un-Nooh. David Lilley beat Wu Yize 5‍–‍4 with breaks of 105 and 100, and Liu Hongyu recovered from 1‍–‍4 down to beat Elliot Slessor 5‍–‍4. Jimmy Robertson defeated Aaron Hill 5‍–‍4 with breaks of 101 and 132, and Ali Carter beat Jack Lisowski 5‍–‍4. Zhou Yuelong defeated Kyren Wilson 5‍–‍4, and Ding Junhui beat Hossein Vafaei 5‍–‍3.

==== Last 16 ====
The last-16 matches were played on 26 February 2025 as the best of nine frames.

In the afternoon session Zak Surety beat Liu Hongyu 5‍–‍2; after the match Surety said: "I played well until 3‍–‍2 up, then in the sixth frame I was trying to keep the same momentum and same rhythm but I started panicking and waiting for things to go wrong. I still managed to go 4‍–‍2 up, then in the last frame I was struggling to even count let alone pot the balls. I still can't feel my legs. I'm playing well, but in the crucial parts of frames and matches I am letting the occasion get to me." Barry Hawkins beat Ryan Day 5‍–‍3; after the match Hawkins said: "I feel fortunate because my game hasn't be there this week, I am riding my luck, battling hard and nicking frames. I'm still here and I can always improve in the next round. It has been a good season for me, I have been at the business end of a lot of tournaments, although I would have liked to win a final. I am in all of the big tournaments coming up so I can enjoy the rest of the season." John Higgins recovered from 2‍–‍4 behind to beat Zhou Yuelong 5‍–‍4, equalling the record held by Ronnie O'Sullivan of reaching 146 ranking event quarter-finals. After the match Higgins said: "I have been on the wrong end of a lot of deciders lately, so I'm delighted, it's a great win for me. Zhou [Yuelong] was looking really strong at 4‍–‍2. I love him as a boy and as a player. His game is so good, it's just a matter of time before he gets into the winner's enclosure." Pang Junxu defeated Xu Si 5‍–‍2.

In the evening session Ali Carter beat David Lilley 5‍–‍1; after the match Carter said: "That's probably the best I've played in the last few events, I really enjoy playing Jack [Lisowski, who Carter played in the last-32] because he's the closest thing we've got to Ronnie O'Sullivan. When you play him, you have a tiger by the tail the whole time, he's so inspirational. For me to grind out a victory was very pleasing." Shaun Murphy defeated Ding Junhui 5‍–‍2, Tom Ford beat Jimmy Robertson 5‍–‍3, and Joe O'Connor beat Michael Holt 5‍–‍3.

=== Later rounds ===
==== Quarter finals ====
The quarter-finals were played on 27 February 2025 as the best of nine frames.

In the afternoon session John Higgins whitewashed Pang Junxu, making a 125 break in the first frame. After the match Higgins said: "If you ever lose the hunger to win, you may as well not bother. For me that has never been in question, but sometimes it's the mental fragility or the pressure. I have been doing something different for the last couple of months, you try little things. I played Zak [Surety] in Wuhan and we had a good game. He's really improved this week. He's very relaxed and really enjoying it. He's had a great win against Tom [Ford] today. He's such a dangerous player so I'll have to try to play my best." Zak Surety beat Tom Ford 5‍–‍3, with breaks of 133 and 103. After the match Surety said: "I am in unknown territory now, I am enjoying it, although I'm also waiting to go home. I want to have a cup of tea, go running in the woods, play with my dogs and see my mum. Maybe that's relaxing me. But when I'm in the arena, I'm desperate to win. I want to be a top snooker player and there are big ranking points on offer. So I'm fighting myself. I was very nervous today, although I felt better after the interval and I can't work out why, because it's the biggest match I have ever played in. I have had a twitch-up a few times and lost my way. But when I'm in the balls, I feel good, as if I am playing PlayStation. I've got to enjoy it, let's see what happens tomorrow. I have played John [Higgins] before in China and it was a close game, though that was on an outside table."

In the evening session Joe O'Connor defeated Shaun Murphy 5‍–‍1, with breaks of 135, 100 and 132, Murphy also making a 128 break. After the match O'Connor said: "I played really well and didn't give Shaun [Murphy] many chances. When the long pots are going in you have to punish the top players, that's what I did today and I'm proud of it. It's cementing confidence I have had for many years. This week it has all come together and hopefully I can win the trophy. If I play like that it will take a lot to stop me. I have been consistent for a while now and when my game clicks I feel I can beat anyone." Ali Carter recovered from 1‍–‍3 and 3‍–‍4 down to beat Barry Hawkins 5‍–‍4. After the match Carter said: "I lost to Stephen Maguire in the semis of the Welsh, I felt I was hot favourite but I got myself at it, stopped myself from playing well and sort of threw it away. I learned my lesson from that and I was determined not to do that again and lose due to my own temperament and stupidity. In this game you have to stick at it and be resilient. The older you get, the harder it is to do that. ... Joe [O'Connor] bossed the game against Shaun [Murphy], every time I looked at the scoreboard it looked like he wasn't missing a ball. It will be an intriguing match and I'm looking forward to it."

==== Semi finals ====
The semi-finals were played on 28 February 2025 as the best of eleven frames.

In the afternoon session John Higgins recovered from 3‍–‍5 down to beat Zak Surety 6‍–‍5, making a 113 break in the fifth frame. With this win Higgins, aged 49 years and 286 days, became the oldest ranking event finalist since the 1986 Grand Prix when Rex Williams, aged 53 years and 98 days, lost to Jimmy White. After the match Higgins said: "Zak [Surety] totally outplayed me, he just missed a couple of crucial balls at the end. He was holding himself together brilliantly at 5‍–‍3, every credit to him in his first semi. It's a tough game when you're under pressure. It will be hard for him to take but hopefully he'll reflect on reaching the semi-finals and the ranking points. He is such an improved player, I think he'll keep moving up. Hopefully this will make him better as every player goes through devastating losses. He had some nice words for me at the end and that shows the mark of the man. You want good things to happen to people like that, when they take defeats with good grace."

In the evening session Joe O'Connor beat Ali Carter 6‍–‍3. After the match O'Connor said: "It was another solid performance, Ali [Carter] wasn't at his best but I took my chances when I got them. I feel I'm a more complete player than I was when I last reached a final in 2022 [at the Scottish Open], I am more consistent and my scoring has definitely improved. Hopefully that can continue and who knows what will happen tomorrow. I'd say 99.9% of the time I don't feel nerves, I try to just focus on the next shot and that doesn't leave room for nerves to creep in."

==== Final ====
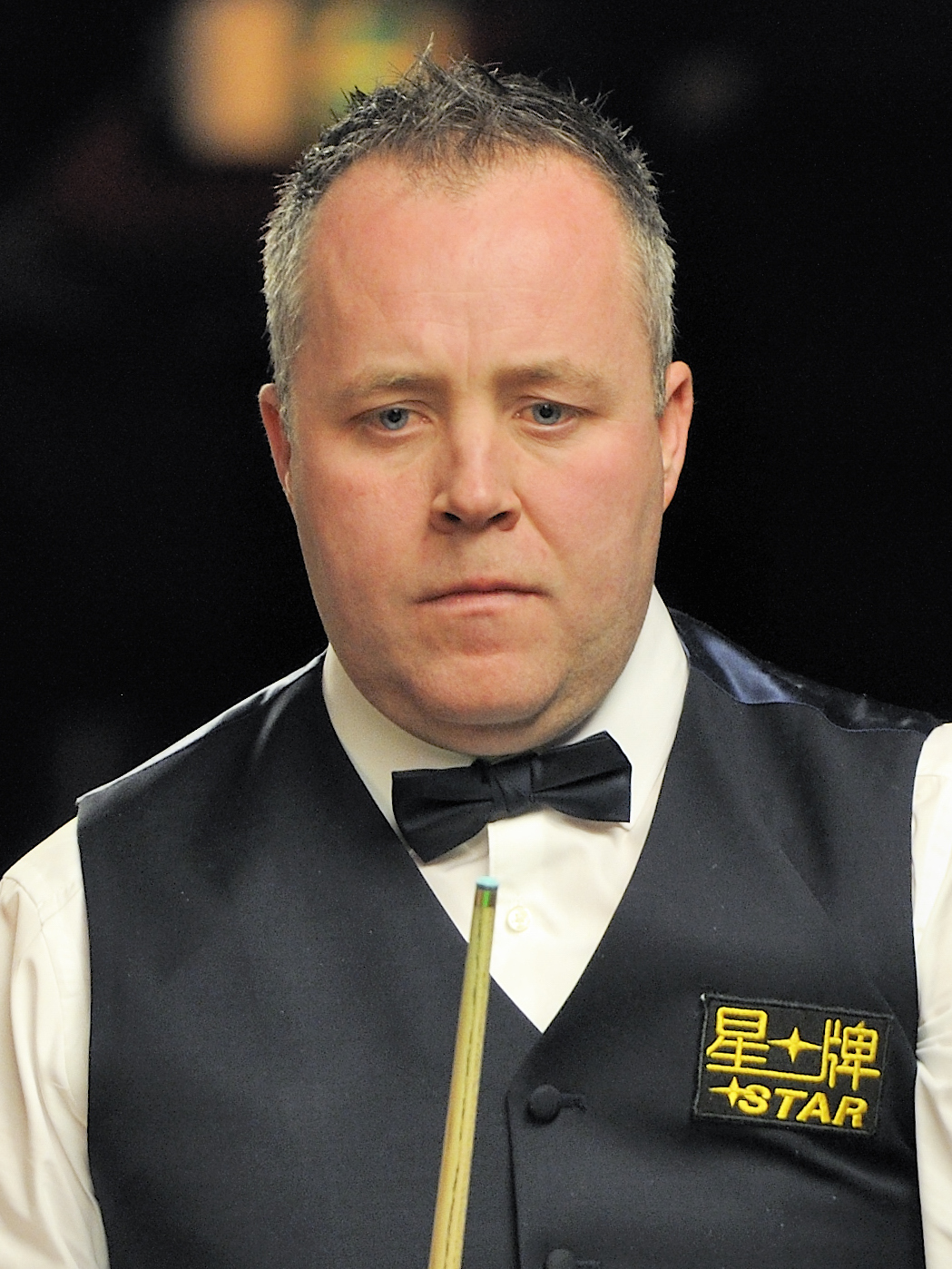
John Higgins (pictured) beat Joe O'Connor 10‍–‍6 in the final.

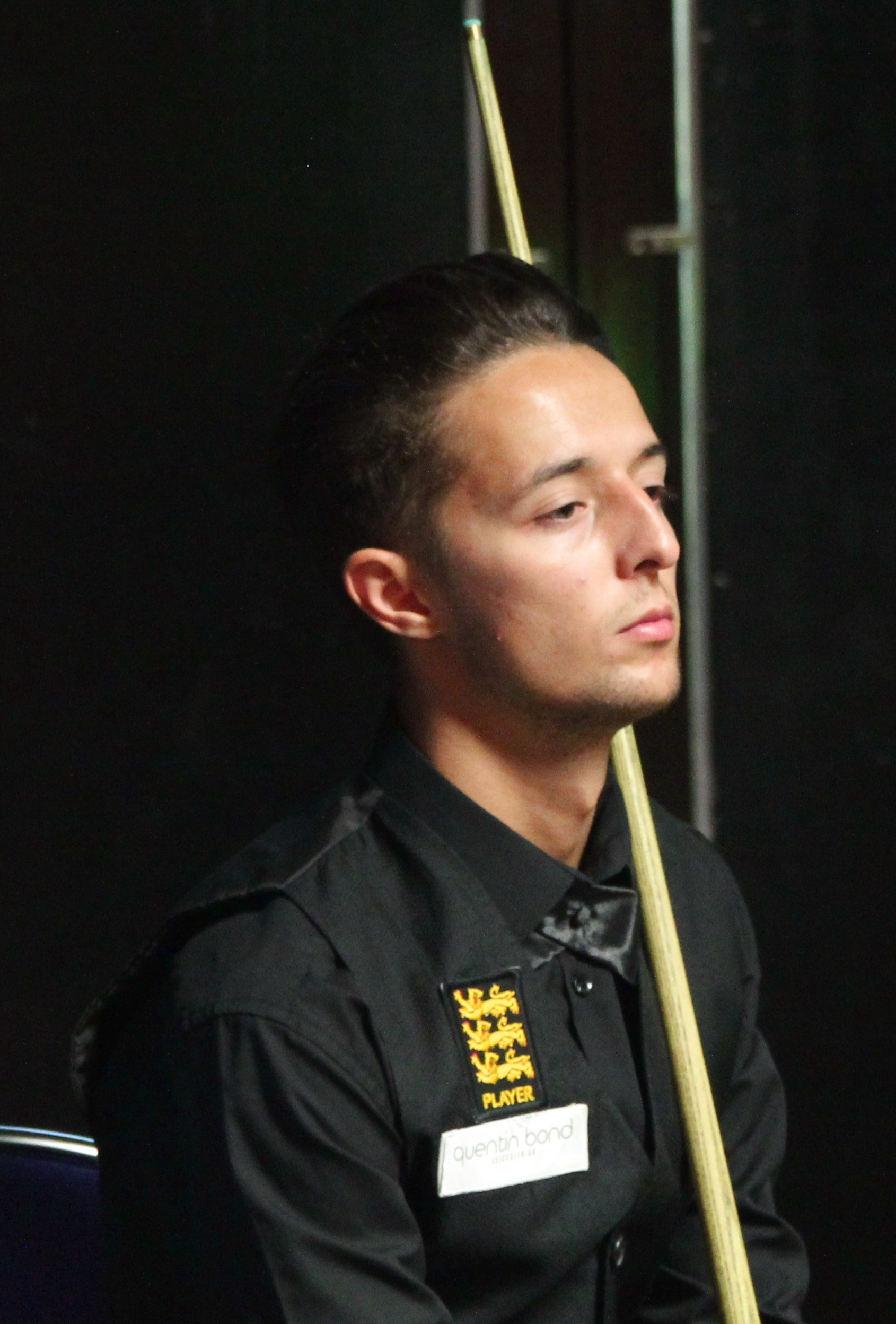
Joe O'Connor (pictured) was playing in only his second ranking final.

The final was played on 1 March 2025 as the best of 19 frames, played over two sessions.

John Higgins, appearing in his 57th ranking final, faced Joe O'Connor, who was playing in only his second. At the end of the afternoon session Higgins led O'Connor 6‍–‍2. Higgins went on to win the match 10‍–‍6 and take the title, making the only century break of the match in the 16th frame. It was Higgins's 32nd ranking title and his first since the 2021 Players Championship. Aged 49 years and 287 days, Higgins became the second-oldest ranking event winner, after Ray Reardon, who was 50 years and 14 days old when Reardon won the 1982 Professional Players Tournament. After the match Higgins said: "I'm just delighted. I am drained, there has been a lot of nervous energy in the last couple of days. I am dead proud to win another big event at this age, I didn't know if I was going to win another event because I have taken so many devastating losses over the last three or four years. To come back and win this is a proud moment. Joe [O'Connor] didn't play his best today, having been unbelievable all week. He didn't have the same game he had against Shaun [Murphy], Judd [Trump], and Ali [Carter]. The first frame was massive because he had a chance to win it on the last black and if he had gone 1‍–‍0 up he would have taken confidence. I kept him under pressure, my safety was pretty good all day. He's a great all-round player but just didn't turn up today, he'll come again I'm sure."

== Main draw ==
The draw for the tournament is shown below. Numbers in parentheses after the players' names denote the top 32 seeded players, an "a" indicates amateur players who were not on the main World Snooker Tour, and players in bold denote match winners.

=== Top half ===
**Last 64**; Best of 9 frames
**Judd Trump (ENG) (1)**	**5**
Long Zehuang (CHN)	1
Alfie Burden (ENG)	1
**Joe O'Connor (ENG)**	**5**
**Antoni Kowalski (POL)**	**5**
Matthew Stevens (WAL)	3
**Michael Holt (ENG)**	**5**
Martin O'Donnell (ENG)	3
Yuan Sijun (CHN)	4
**Hossein Vafaei (IRN) (24)**	**5**
Joe Perry (ENG)	2
**Ding Junhui (CHN) (9)**	**5**
**Thepchaiya Un-Nooh (THA)**	**w/o**
Chris Totten (SCO) (Note: Chris Totten withdrew and so Thepchaiya Un-Nooh was given a walkover to the last 32.)	w/d
Zhou Jinhao (CHN) (a)	0
**Shaun Murphy (ENG) (8)**	**5**
Mark Allen (NIR) (5)	4
**David Lilley (ENG)**	**5**
**Wu Yize (CHN) (28)**	**5**
Jackson Page (WAL)	4
**Ali Carter (ENG) (12)**	**5**
He Guoqiang (CHN)	3
**Jack Lisowski (ENG) (21)**	**5**
Scott Donaldson (SCO)	2
**Ben Woollaston (ENG)**	**5**
Amir Sarkhosh (IRN)	0
Jamie Jones (WAL)	2
**Barry Hawkins (ENG) (13)**	**5**
Ricky Walden (ENG) (Note: Ricky Walden withdrew and so Ryan Day was given a walkover to the last 32.)	w/d
**Ryan Day (WAL) (29)**	**w/o**
**Louis Heathcote (ENG)**	**5**
Stuart Carrington (ENG)	3

**Last 32**; Best of 9 frames
(England) Judd Trump (1)	2
**(England) Joe O'Connor**	**5**
(Poland) Antoni Kowalski	1
**(England) Michael Holt**	**5**
(Iran) Hossein Vafaei (24)	3
**(China) Ding Junhui (9)**	**5**
(Thailand) Thepchaiya Un-Nooh	0
**(England) Shaun Murphy (8)**	**5**
**(England) David Lilley**	**5**
(China) Wu Yize (28)	4
**(England) Ali Carter (12)**	**5**
(England) Jack Lisowski (21)	4
(England) Ben Woollaston	4
**(England) Barry Hawkins (13)**	**5**
**(Wales) Ryan Day (29)**	**5**
(England) Louis Heathcote	2

**Last 16**; Best of 9 frames
**(England) Joe O'Connor**	**5**
(England) Michael Holt	3
(China) Ding Junhui (9)	2
**(England) Shaun Murphy (8)**	**5**
(England) David Lilley	1
**(England) Ali Carter (12)**	**5**
**(England) Barry Hawkins (13)**	**5**
(Wales) Ryan Day (29)	3

**Quarter-finals**; Best of 9 frames
**(England) Joe O'Connor**	**5**
(England) Shaun Murphy (8)	1
**(England) Ali Carter (12)**	**5**
(England) Barry Hawkins (13)	4

**Semi-finals**; Best of 11 frames
**(England) Joe O'Connor**	**6**
(England) Ali Carter (12)	3

Note: w/d=withdrawn; w/o=walkover

=== Bottom half ===
**Last 64**; Best of 9 frames
Mark Selby (ENG) (3)	2
**Liu Hongyu (CHN)**	**5**
**Elliot Slessor (ENG) (30)**	**5**
Lyu Haotian (CHN)	2
**Zak Surety (ENG)**	**5**
Jordan Brown (NIR)	4
Xiao Guodong (CHN) (19)	4
**Duane Jones (WAL)**	**5**
Ishpreet Singh Chadha (IND)	4
**Tom Ford (ENG) (22)**	**5**
**Daniel Wells (WAL)**	**5**
Gary Wilson (ENG) (11)	4
**Jimmy Robertson (ENG)**	**5**
Noppon Saengkham (THA) (27)	3
**Aaron Hill (IRL)**	**5**
Sunny Akani (THA)	3
Luca Brecel (BEL) (7) (Note: Luca Brecel withdrew and so Tian Pengfei was given a walkover to the last 32.)	w/d
**Tian Pengfei (CHN)**	**w/o**
**Pang Junxu (CHN) (26)**	**5**
Anthony McGill (SCO)	0
**Stan Moody (ENG)**	**5**
Graeme Dott (SCO)	2
Robert Milkins (ENG) (23)	3
**Xu Si (CHN)**	**5**
**Robbie Williams (ENG)**	**w/o**
Jak Jones (WAL) (18) (Note: Jak Jones withdrew and so Robbie Williams was given a walkover to the last 32.)	w/d
Mark Davis (ENG)	1
**John Higgins (SCO) (15)**	**5**
Manasawin Phetmalaikul (THA)	1
**Zhou Yuelong (CHN) (31)**	**5**
Lei Peifan (CHN)	1
**Kyren Wilson (ENG) (2)**	**5**

**Last 32**; Best of 9 frames
**(China) Liu Hongyu**	**5**
(England) Elliot Slessor (30)	4
**(England) Zak Surety**	**5**
(Wales) Duane Jones	4
**(England) Tom Ford (22)**	**5**
(Wales) Daniel Wells	3
**(England) Jimmy Robertson**	**5**
(Republic of Ireland) Aaron Hill	4
(China) Tian Pengfei	3
**(China) Pang Junxu (26)**	**5**
(England) Stan Moody	3
**(China) Xu Si**	**5**
(England) Robbie Williams	3
**(Scotland) John Higgins (15)**	**5**
**(China) Zhou Yuelong (31)**	**5**
(England) Kyren Wilson (2)	4

**Last 16**; Best of 9 frames
(China) Liu Hongyu	2
**(England) Zak Surety**	**5**
**(England) Tom Ford (22)**	**5**
(England) Jimmy Robertson	3
**(China) Pang Junxu (26)**	**5**
(China) Xu Si	2
**(Scotland) John Higgins (15)**	**5**
(China) Zhou Yuelong (31)	4

**Quarter-finals**; Best of 9 frames
**(England) Zak Surety**	**5**
(England) Tom Ford (22)	3
(China) Pang Junxu (26)	0
**(Scotland) John Higgins (15)**	**5**

**Semi-finals**; Best of 11 frames
(England) Zak Surety	5
**(Scotland) John Higgins (15)**	**6**

Note: w/d=withdrawn; w/o=walkover

=== Final ===
Final: Best of 19 frames. Referee: Wang Haitao; Yushan Sport Centre, Yushan, China, 1 March 2025
Joe O'Connor; England	6–**10**	**John Higgins** (15); Scotland
Afternoon: 63–**66**, 0–**106**, 0–**81**, **86**–14, 61–**64**, 30–**68**, 29–**80**, **46**–19; Evening: 36–**101**, **87**–38, **70**–0, 24–**95**, 0–**94**, **71**–25, **75**–43, 0–**100** (100)
(frame 10) 71	Highest break	**100** (frame 16)
0	Century breaks	**1**

== Qualifying ==
Qualification for the tournament took place from 20 to 22 December 2024 at the Ponds Forge International Sports Centre in Sheffield, England. Matches involving defending champion Judd Trump, reigning World Champion Kyren Wilson, the two highest-ranked Chinese players (Ding Junhui and Zhang Anda), four Chinese wildcards (Zhou Jinhao, Cao Jin, Wang Yuhang, and Zou Pengfei); and Daniel Womersley were held over to be played at the final venue. Numbers in parentheses after the players' names denote the top 32 seeded players, an "a" indicates amateur players who were not on the main World Snooker Tour, and players in bold denote match winners.

=== Yushan ===
The results of the held-over matches played in Yushan on 23 February 2025 were as follows:

- **Judd Trump** (ENG) (1) **5**–0 Xing Zihao (CHN)
- **Ding Junhui** (CHN) (9) **5**–1 Jiang Jun (CHN)
- Sanderson Lam (ENG) 1–**5** **Zhou Jinhao** (CHN) (a)
- **David Lilley** (ENG) **5**–4 Cao Jin (CHN) (a)
- **Scott Donaldson** (SCO) **5**–0 Wang Yuhang (CHN) (a)
- **Stuart Carrington** (ENG) **5**–2 Daniel Womersley (ENG) (a)
- Zhang Anda (CHN) (10) 3–**5** **Stan Moody** (ENG)
- **Xu Si** (CHN) **5**–3 Zou Pengfei (CHN) (a)
- **Kyren Wilson** (ENG) (2) **5**–2 Hammad Miah (ENG)

=== Sheffield ===
The results of the qualifying matches played in Sheffield were as follows:

==== 20 December 2024 ====
- **Barry Hawkins** (ENG) (13) **5**–1 Cheung Ka Wai (HKG)
- **Aaron Hill** (IRL) **5**–0 Mink Nutcharut (THA)
- **Wu Yize** (CHN) (28) **5**–0 Robbie McGuigan (NIR)
- **Yuan Sijun** (CHN) **5**–0 Haydon Pinhey (ENG)
- **Thepchaiya Un-Nooh** (THA) **5**–3 Andrew Higginson (ENG)
- Si Jiahui (CHN) (14) 0–**5** **Zak Surety** (ENG)
- **Long Zehuang** (CHN) **5**–2 Mitchell Mann (ENG)
- **Tom Ford** (ENG) (22) **5**–1 Ahmed Aly Elsayed (USA)
- **Joe Perry** (ENG) **5**–0 Kreishh Gurbaxani (IND)
- **Gary Wilson** (ENG) (11) **5**–1 Gong Chenzhi (CHN)
- **Jordan Brown** (NIR) **5**–1 Liam Graham (SCO)
- **Hossein Vafaei** (IRN) (24) **5**–3 Ben Mertens (BEL)
- Stephen Maguire (SCO) (32) 4–**5** **Alfie Burden** (ENG)
- **Joe O'Connor** (ENG) **5**–3 Alexander Ursenbacher (SUI)
- Jamie Clarke (WAL) 1–**5** **Louis Heathcote** (ENG)
- **Jackson Page** (WAL) **5**–1 Ashley Carty (ENG)
- Stuart Bingham (ENG) (25) 1–**5** **Chris Totten** (SCO)
- **Jimmy Robertson** (ENG) **5**–3 Haris Tahir (PAK)
- **Elliot Slessor** (ENG) (30) **5**–1 Jonas Luz (BRA)
- **Matthew Stevens** (WAL) **5**–2 David Grace (ENG)
- **Mark Davis** (ENG) **5**–4 Liam Davies (WAL)

==== 21 December 2024 ====
- **Noppon Saengkham** (THA) (27) **5**–1 Dean Young (SCO)
- **Zhou Yuelong** (CHN) (31) **5**–1 Ma Hailong (CHN)
- **He Guoqiang** (CHN) **5**–0 Huang Jiahao (CHN)
- **Tian Pengfei** (CHN) **5**–1 Bai Yulu (CHN)
- **Ryan Day** (WAL) (29) **5**–2 Marco Fu (HKG)
- **Jamie Jones** (WAL) **5**–3 Liam Pullen (ENG)
- **John Higgins** (SCO) (15) **5**–4 Wang Yuchen (HKG)
- **Robert Milkins** (ENG) (23) **5**–2 Farakh Ajaib (PAK)
- **Anthony McGill** (SCO) **5**–0 Reanne Evans (ENG)
- **Antoni Kowalski** (POL) **5**–1 Paul Deaville (ENG) (a) (Note: Chris Wakelin withdrew and was replaced by Paul Deaville.)
- **Ben Woollaston** (ENG) **5**–2 Simon Blackwell (ENG) (a)
- **Ali Carter** (ENG) (12) **5**–4 Joshua Thomond (ENG) (a) (Note: Andrew Pagett withdrew and was replaced by Joshua Thomond.)
- Dominic Dale (WAL) 4–**5** **Ishpreet Singh Chadha** (IND)
- Anthony Hamilton (ENG) 4–**5** **Lei Peifan** (CHN)
- Neil Robertson (AUS) (17) n/s–**w/o** **Michael Holt** (ENG) (Note: Neil Robertson did not show up for his match with Michael Holt and so Holt was given a walkover to the last 64.)
- **Jak Jones** (WAL) (18) **5**–0 Allan Taylor (ENG)
- **Ricky Walden** (ENG) **5**–0 Hatem Yassen (EGY)
- **Jack Lisowski** (ENG) (21) **5**–3 Julien Leclercq (BEL)
- **Martin O'Donnell** (ENG) **5**–4 Bulcsú Révész (HUN)
- **Robbie Williams** (ENG) **5**–4 Ian Burns (ENG)
- **Daniel Wells** (WAL) **5**–2 Ross Muir (SCO)

Note: n/s=no-show; w/o=walkover

==== 22 December 2024 ====
- **Liu Hongyu** (CHN) **5**–0 Baipat Siripaporn (THA)
- **Xiao Guodong** (CHN) (19) **5**–0 Dylan Emery (WAL) (a)
- David Gilbert (ENG) (20) 3–**5** **Amir Sarkhosh** (IRN)
- Matthew Selt (ENG) 2–**5** **Manasawin Phetmalaikul** (THA)
- **Lyu Haotian** (CHN) **5**–2 Oliver Lines (ENG)
- Fan Zhengyi (CHN) 3–**5** **Duane Jones** (WAL)
- **Graeme Dott** (SCO) **5**–1 Jimmy White (ENG)
- **Luca Brecel** (BEL) (7) **5**–3 Iulian Boiko (UKR) (a)
- **Pang Junxu** (CHN) (26) **5**–2 Ken Doherty (IRL)
- Mark Williams (WAL) (6) 2–**5** **Sunny Akani** (THA)
- **Shaun Murphy** (ENG) (8) **5**–3 Mostafa Dorgham (EGY)
- **Mark Selby** (ENG) (3) **5**–4 Artemijs Žižins (LAT)
- **Mark Allen** (NIR) (5) **5**–4 Rory Thor (MAS)

== Century breaks ==
=== Main stage centuries ===
A total of 97 century breaks were made during the main stage of the tournament in Yushan.

- 147, 138, 128, 127, 119 – Shaun Murphy
- 142, 103 – Mark Allen
- 141, 138, 130, 123, 119 – Ding Junhui
- 141, 123, 123, 101 – Stan Moody
- 141 – Mark Selby
- 138, 119, 118, 111, 100, 100 – Kyren Wilson
- 135, 133 – He Guoqiang
- 135, 132, 113, 100 – Joe O'Connor
- 135 – Robbie Williams
- 135 – Yuan Sijun
- 134, 130 – Louis Heathcote
- 133, 132, 126, 107, 104, 103 – Zak Surety
- 133, 118 – Antoni Kowalski
- 132, 101 – Jimmy Robertson
- 131, 124 – Michael Holt
- 131, 119, 106 – Jack Lisowski
- 131 – Ishpreet Singh Chadha
- 129, 127, 102 – Wu Yize
- 126, 125, 113, 111, 100 – John Higgins
- 126, 120, 109, 105, 101 – Zhou Yuelong
- 125, 113, 100 – Pang Junxu
- 125, 101, 101 – Hossein Vafaei
- 123, 105, 102 – Tom Ford
- 121, 117 – Elliot Slessor
- 121, 111, 108, 101, 100 – Judd Trump
- 119 – Zhou Jinhao
- 118 – Jordan Brown
- 117 – Jamie Jones
- 116, 111, 102 – Stuart Carrington
- 112, 105, 100 – David Lilley
- 111 – Ben Woollaston
- 106, 104 – Ryan Day
- 106, 103 – Xu Si
- 105 – Martin O'Donnell
- 104, 102 – Liu Hongyu
- 100 – Ali Carter
- 100 – Daniel Wells

=== Qualifying stage centuries ===
A total of 39 century breaks were made during the qualifying stage of the tournament in Sheffield.

- 145 – Yuan Sijun
- 142 – Mark Selby
- 141 – Mark Williams
- 140, 119 – Gary Wilson
- 139 – Tian Pengfei
- 137 – Mark Allen
- 137 – He Guoqiang
- 135, 108 – Jack Lisowski
- 135 – Lyu Haotian
- 133 – Barry Hawkins
- 132 – Jordan Brown
- 131 – Long Zehuang
- 129 – Jamie Jones
- 127 – Jimmy Robertson
- 120 – Hossein Vafaei
- 117 – Ryan Day
- 116 – Xiao Guodong
- 113, 101, 100 – Pang Junxu
- 110, 100 – Mark Davis
- 109 – Sunny Akani
- 108 – Jackson Page
- 107, 102 – Jak Jones
- 105 – Aaron Hill
- 104 – Dominic Dale
- 104 – Matthew Stevens
- 103, 102 – Chris Totten
- 103 – Fan Zhengyi
- 102 – Julien Leclercq
- 101 – Matthew Selt
- 100 – Ishpreet Singh Chadha
- 100 – Joe Perry
- 100 – Thepchaiya Un-Nooh
