= 2025 International Championship =

Snooker tournament, held in China

Tournament information
- Dates: 2–9 November 2025
- Venue: SNCNFC
- City: Nanjing
- Country: China
- Organisation: World Snooker Tour
- Format: Ranking event
- Total prize fund: £825,000
- Winner's share: £175,000
- Highest break: Gary Wilson (ENG) (147); Zak Surety (ENG) (147)

Final
- Champion: Wu Yize (CHN)
- Runner-up: John Higgins (SCO)
- Score: 10–6

The 2025 International Championship was a professional snooker tournament that took place from 2 to 9 November 2025 at the South New City National Fitness Center (SNCNFC) in Nanjing, China. Qualifiers took place from 30 September to 2 October at the Ponds Forge International Sports Centre in Sheffield, England. The 11th edition of the International Championship since it was first staged in 2012, it was the eighth ranking event of the 2025–26 snooker season, following the 2025 Northern Ireland Open and preceding the 2025 UK Championship. The tournament was broadcast by local channels in China and elsewhere in Asia, by TNT Sports in the United Kingdom and Ireland, by Eurosport in mainland Europe, and by WST Play in all other territories. The winner received £175,000 from a total prize fund of £825,000.

Ding Junhui was the defending champion, having defeated Chris Wakelin 10–7 in the 2024 final, but he lost 2–6 to Shaun Murphy in the fourth round. The final was contested between 50-year-old John Higgins and 22-year-old Wu Yize, giving rise to the fourth-largest age difference of any ranking final in snooker history. Following defeats in his two previous ranking finals, Wu defeated Higgins 10–6 to win his maiden ranking title. He advanced to a career high of 13th place in the world rankings, entering the top 16 for the first time.

The tournament produced a record 160 century breaks, 37 during the qualifying matches in Sheffield and 123 at the main venue in Nanjing, surpassing the previous record of 155 set at the 2023 event. Wu made 14 centuries during the tournament. Two maximum breaks were compiled at the event: Gary Wilson made the sixth maximum of his career during his 6–3 win over Artemijs Žižins in the Sheffield qualifiers, and Zak Surety made the second maximum of his career in his 6–5 win over Aaron Hill in the third round. These were respectively the 11th and 14th maximums of the season and the 228th and 231st official maximums in professional snooker history.

During his 6–1 win over Umut Dikme in the Sheffield qualifiers, Neil Robertson became the fourth player to reach the milestone of 1,000 career century breaks, following Ronnie O'Sullivan, Higgins, and Judd Trump. During her pre-qualifying match in Nanjing, Bai Yulu compiled a century of 145, the highest break by a female player in professional competition.

== Overview ==
The International Championship is a professional ranking snooker tournament held in China. It first took place in 2012 and the inaugural champion was Judd Trump, who defeated Neil Robertson 10–8 in the final. Staged from 2012 to 2014 in Chengdu and from 2015 to 2019 in Daqing, the tournament was not held from 2020 to 2022 due to the impact of the COVID-19 pandemic. Following its return to the calendar, the tournament was staged in Tianjin in 2023 and Nanjing in 2024.

The 2025 edition of the tournament—the 11th staging of the event—took place from 2 to 9 November at the South New City National Fitness Center (SNCNFC) in Nanjing. Qualifiers took place from 30 September to 2 October at the Ponds Forge International Sports Centre in Sheffield, England. It was the eighth ranking event of the 2025–26 snooker season, following the 2025 Northern Ireland Open and preceding the 2025 UK Championship. It was also the last event to determine the top 16 players who were seeded through to the main stage of the 2025 UK Championship. Ding Junhui was the defending champion, having defeated Chris Wakelin 10–7 in the 2024 final.

=== Format ===
Matches were played as the best of 11 frames until the semi‑finals, which were played as the best of 17 frames, held over two sessions. The final was the best of 19 frames, also held over two sessions.

Marco Fu withdrew from the tournament before the qualifiers after suffering a fractured elbow. He was replaced in the qualifying draw by amateur player Umut Dikme. Mark Williams, Ali Carter, Sam Craigie, Ken Doherty, and David Gilbert also withdrew before the event's main stage. Their respective opponents, Anthony McGill, Aaron Hill, Jimmy Robertson, Neil Robertson, and Thepchaiya Un-Nooh, all received byes to the last 32.

=== Broadcasters ===
The qualifying round was broadcast in the United Kingdom, Germany, Italy, and Austria by Discovery+ and in other European territories by HBO Max. It was broadcast in mainland China by the CBSA‑WPBSA Academy WeChat Channel, the CBSA‑WPBSA Academy Douyin, Huya Live and Migu. In all other territories (including Ireland) it was streamed by WST Play.

The main stage was broadcast in the United Kingdom and Ireland by TNT Sports and Discovery+. It was broadcast in mainland Europe by Eurosport, with streaming coverage on Discovery+ in Germany, Italy, and Austria and on HBO Max in other European territories. It was broadcast in mainland China by the same broadcasters as the qualifying rounds and in Macau by CCTV-5. It was broadcast in Hong Kong by Now TV, in Thailand by TrueSports, and in Taiwan by Sportcast. In territories where no other coverage was available, the tournament was streamed by WST Play.

=== Prize fund ===
The breakdown of prize money for the event is shown below:

- Winner: £175,000
- Runner-up: £75,000
- Semi-final: £33,000
- Quarter-final: £22,000
- Last 16: £14,000
- Last 32: £9,000
- Last 64: £5,000
- Highest break: £5,000
- Total: £825,000

== Summary ==
=== Round one (qualifiers) ===
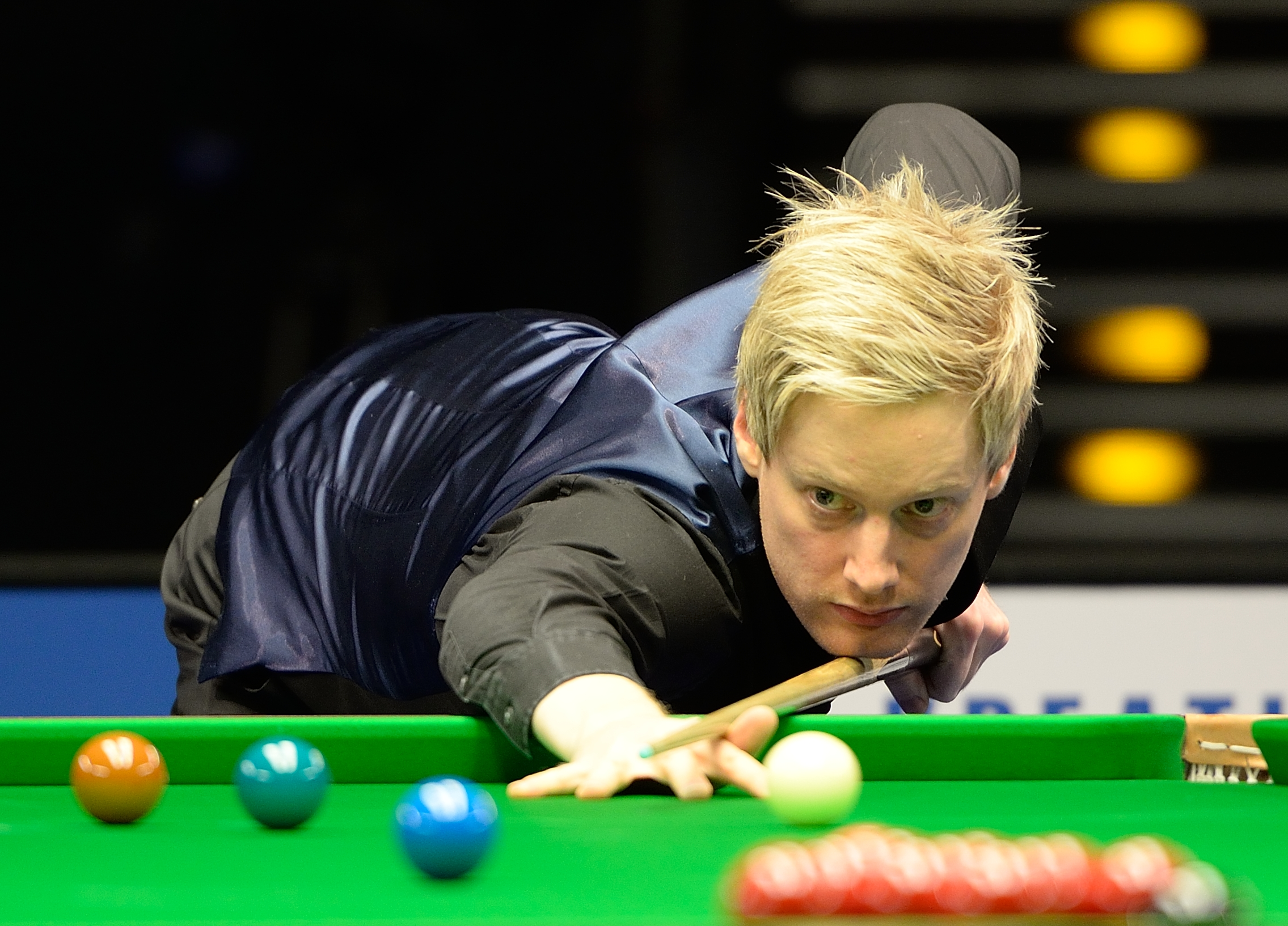
Neil Robertson (pictured in 2015) made the 1,000th century break of his career during the qualifiers in Sheffield. He was the fourth player to reach this milestone.

In the Sheffield qualifiers, Neil Robertson made the 1,000th century break of his professional career during his 6–1 win over Umut Dikme. He became the fourth player in snooker history to reach the milestone of 1,000 centuries, following Ronnie O'Sullivan, John Higgins, and Judd Trump. Higgins led the world number 103 Liam Pullen 3–0, but Pullen—who had recently defeated Higgins in the 2025 Xi'an Grand Prix qualifiers—won four consecutive frames to lead 4–3 and also led 5–4. Higgins recovered to win the match in a deciding frame. Ben Mertens made two century breaks of 132 and 124 as he defeated Matthew Selt 6–3, and Mark Selby also made two centuries of 124 and 131 in his whitewash win over Steven Hallworth. Jack Lisowski made two centuries of 101 and 128 and four other half-centuries as he beat Bulcsú Révész 6–2. Veteran player Ken Doherty took a 5–3 lead over Stan Moody, a player 37 years his junior, but Moody made breaks of 76 and 51 to level at 5–5. Doherty won the decider, but he subsequently withdrew from the event. Liu Wenwei, who had recently turned professional, took the first three frames against Luca Brecel and went on to lead 4–1 and 5–2. Brecel won the next two frames, but Liu secured a 6–4 victory. Kyren Wilson and Mark Williams both won their qualifying matches 6–2, over Gong Chenzhi and Iulian Boiko respectively, although Williams subsequently withdrew from the main stage.

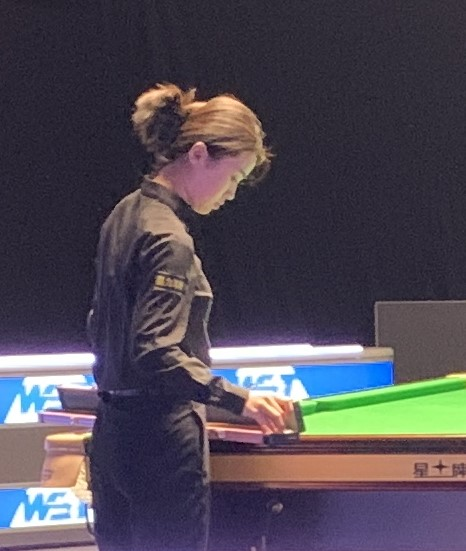
Bai Yulu (pictured in 2024) made a 145 break, the highest ever achieved by a female player in professional competition.

Gary Wilson made the sixth maximum break of his career in the final frame of his 6–3 victory over Artemijs Žižins, having made a 133 break earlier in the match. It was the 11th maximum of the season and the 228th in professional snooker history. Mark Allen, recent winner of the 2025 English Open, trailed the world number 84 Mitchell Mann 2–4. Allen made breaks of 85 and 82 as he tied the scores at 4–4, but Mann, who had reached the quarter-finals of the previous week's 2025 British Open, won the next two frames to secure a 6–4 victory. Sam Craigie made a century of 128 as he beat Joe O'Connor 6–1, but he later withdrew from the tournament. Liam Highfield trailed Jackson Page 1–3 but recovered to win the match in a deciding frame. Michał Szubarczyk, aged 14, the youngest ever professional player, defeated Ishpreet Singh Chadha 6–4. Shaun Murphy, recent winner of the 2025 British Open, made a century of 120 in his 6–1 win over Yao Pengcheng, while Stephen Maguire came from 2–4 behind to beat Kreishh Gurbaxani in a deciding frame. Ali Carter whitewashed Liam Graham but subsequently withdrew from the main stage. Michael Holt beat Reanne Evans 6–2, and Aaron Hill advanced with a 6–1 win over fellow Cork player Leone Crowley.

In the held-over qualifiers played in Nanjing, O'Sullivan trailed Allan Taylor 1–3 and 2–4 but then made three consecutive centuries of 100, 119, and 129 to take the lead at 5–4. Taylor forced a decider, but O'Sullivan secured victory with his fourth century of the match, a 128. "I'm enjoying playing more than I have done for maybe over a decade," he said afterwards. "When I click into gear, that raises the temperature in there a little bit." The world number one Judd Trump had advanced beyond the last 16 of a ranking tournament for the first time that season by reaching the final of the 2025 Northern Ireland Open. He was tied at 4–4 with Dylan Emery but then won two consecutive frames for a 6–4 victory. Bai Yulu, the reigning World Women's Champion, made a total clearance of 145 in her pre-qualifying match against 14-year-old amateur wildcard player Wang Xinzhong, setting a new record for the highest break by a female player in professional competition. The record had previously been held by Ng On-yee, who made a 137 break at the 2025 English Open. Wang defeated Bai in a deciding frame and reached the last 64 later that day with a 6–1 win over Robbie Williams. Zhao Xintong, the reigning World Champion, made a 135 break in his 6–1 win over Oliver Brown. Thepchaiya Un-Nooh whitewashed Xu Jiarui, while the defending champion Ding Junhui made four century breaks as he whitewashed David Grace.

=== Round two (last 64) ===
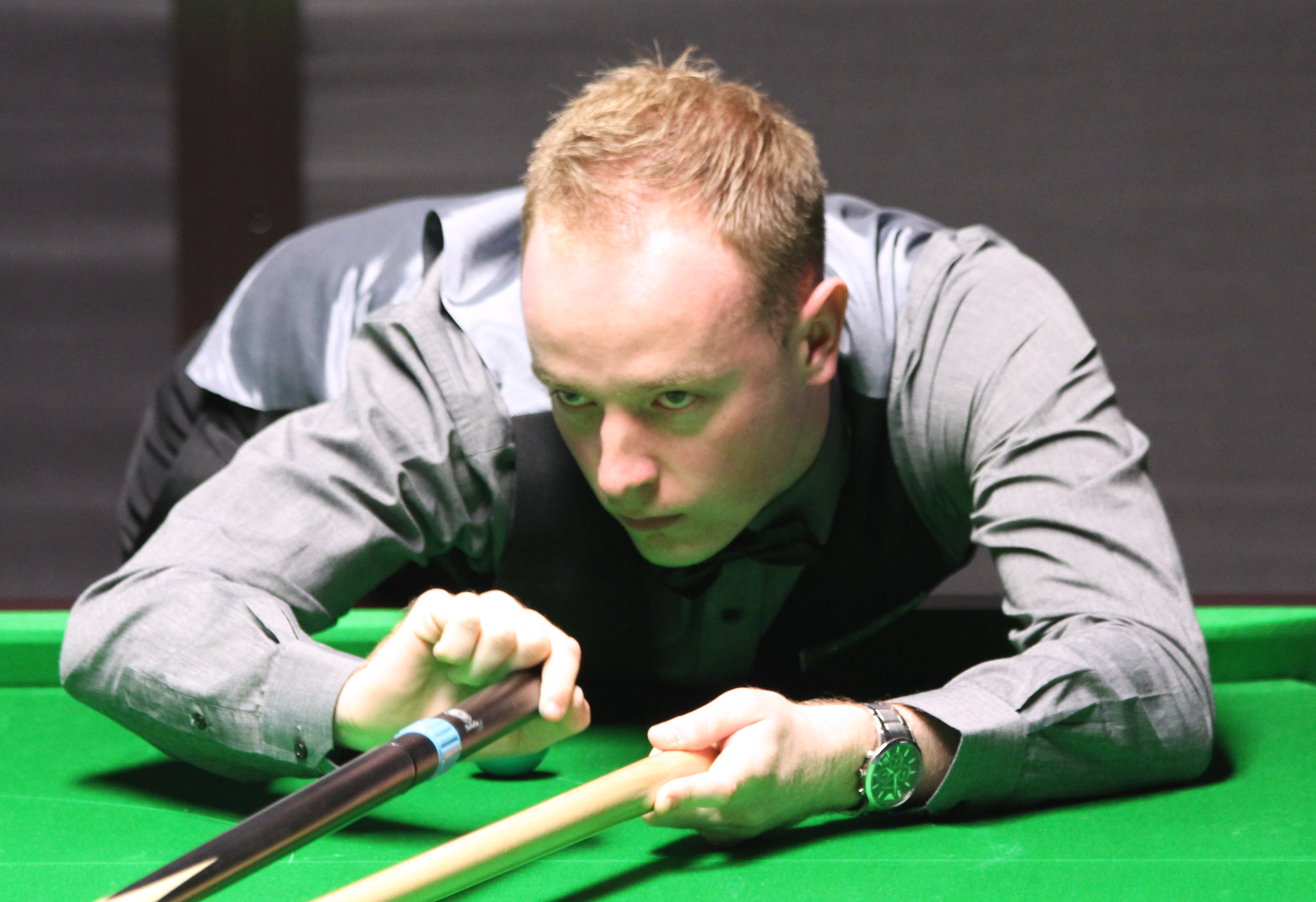
The previous year's runner-up Chris Wakelin (pictured in 2016) lost to the world number 111 Jiang Jun.

The previous year's runner-up Chris Wakelin lost 2–6 to the world number 111 Jiang Jun, while Selby defeated Liu Hongyu in a deciding frame. Higgins made breaks of 86, 66, and 56 during his 6–2 win over Oliver Lines, saying afterwards that "[Lines] really struggled and I just picked up the pieces." Kyren Wilson made a highest break of 95 as he beat David Lilley 6–2. Trump defeated Matthew Stevens 6–3, and Zak Surety advanced with a 6–1 win over Xiao Guodong. Continuing his title defence, Ding made two further centuries of 134 and 112 as he defeated Holt 6–1, meaning he had won twelve of the first thirteen frames he had played at the event, six of them with century breaks. O'Sullivan lost the first two frames against Sanderson Lam but then took six in a row for a 6–2 victory. Having recently claimed his maiden ranking title at the 2025 Northern Ireland Open, Lisowski made four centuries of 127, 103, 115, and 130 in his 6–4 win over Louis Heathcote, who also produced a century of 136 in the match. Zhao made a highest break of 111 as he beat Fan Zhengyi 6–3. Barry Hawkins defeated Huang Jiahao in a deciding frame after Huang had made breaks of 110 and 130 in the match.

Murphy won the first three frames against the 14-year-old wildcard Wang, who then made breaks of 81, 100, and 58 to tie the scores at 3–3. Murphy won frame seven with a 77 break, but Wang made breaks of 105 and 74 as he took a 5–4 lead. After Wang missed a black off its spot in frame 10, Murphy tied the scores with a break of 72 and then took the decider with an 89 break. After the match, Murphy said: "I've never seen anything like that. I was good at 14. [O'Sullivan] was good at 14, as were many others. I think that young man may well be the best 14-year-old I've ever seen. He has everything. I kept waiting for him to crack but he played like someone who has 20 titles and doesn't have a care in the world. I think I've just seen the future of snooker." Highfield made back-to-back centuries of 117 and 102 as he defeated Pang Junxu 6–4. Hossein Vafaei, Jak Jones, and Slessor each made three century breaks in their respective matches as they all advanced to the last 32.

=== Round three (last 32) ===
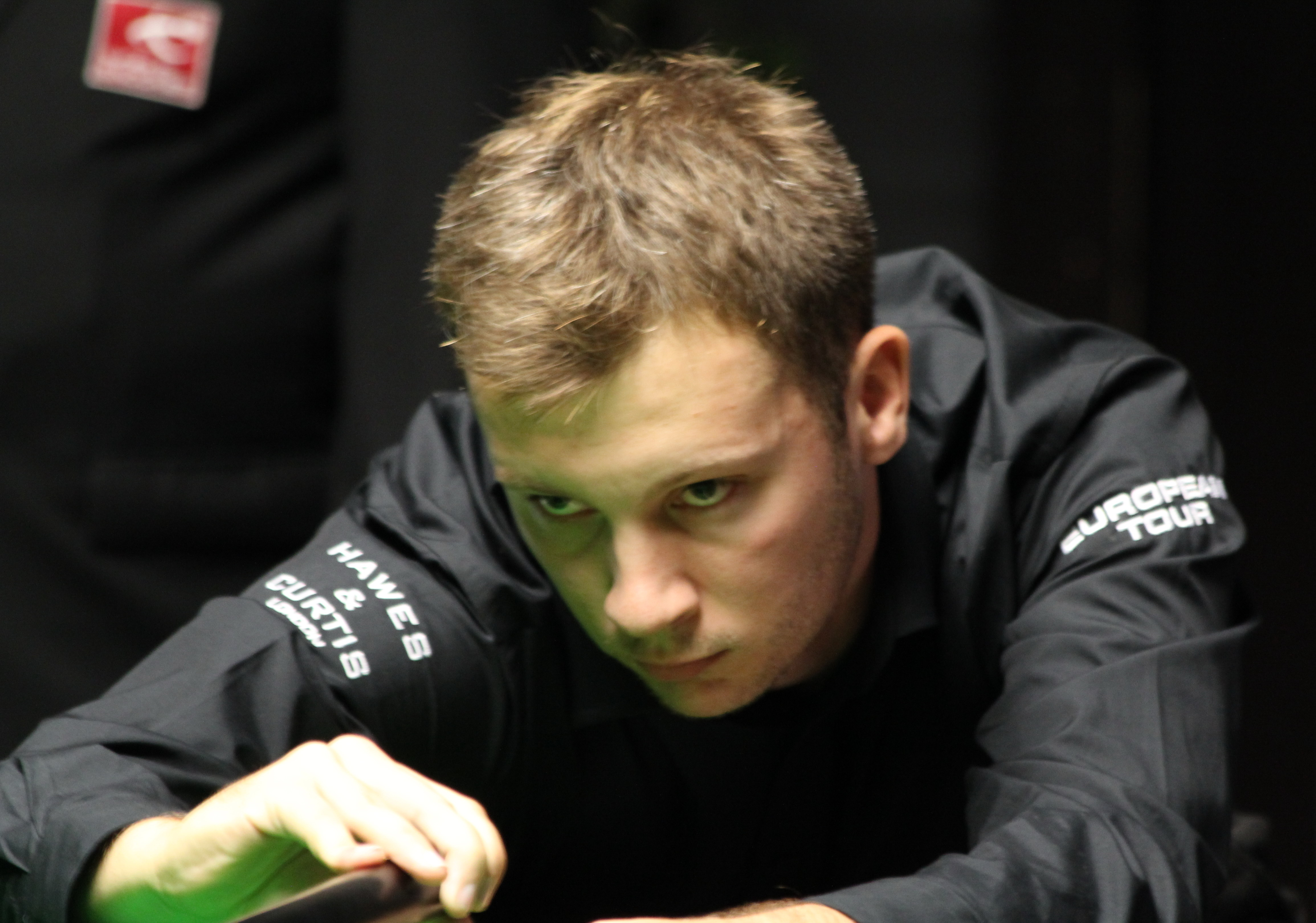
Zak Surety (pictured in 2014) made the second maximum break of his career. It was the 14th maximum of the season.

Surety made the second maximum break of his professional career in his 6–5 win over Hill. It was the 14th maximum of the season and the 231st official maximum in snooker history. Lisowski made breaks of 72, 75, 113, 88, and 63 as he took a 5–3 lead over O'Sullivan. Lisowski had match-winning opportunities in the ninth and tenth frames, but O'Sullivan won both to tie the scores at 5–5. Both players missed opportunities to win the deciding frame before Lisowski secured victory on the colours by clearing from brown to black, potting the winning black along the top cushion. It was the first time Lisowski had beaten O'Sullivan, having lost 1–6 in three of their four previous meetings. "I sort of collapsed over the line," said Lisowski afterwards. "I got lucky when it mattered a few times at the end. I was doing alright to 5–3 up, then I started thinking I could beat [O'Sullivan]. That is such a big deal. I've watched him since being a child. I've never gotten close to him." Hawkins defeated Jak Jones, Trump beat Noppon Saengkham, and Higgins defeated Vafaei, all by 6–3 scorelines. Zhao won the first two frames against Lei Peifan, but Lei recovered to lead 5–4. Zhao tied the scores with a 96 break and then made a 62 break in the decider to advance. Si Jiahui made centuries of 138 and 110 as he whitewashed Gary Wilson, and Maguire made centuries of 104 and 116 as he defeated the world number two Kyren Wilson. Wu Yize made three consecutive centuries of 113, 137, and 119 as he beat Zhang Anda 6–3. Zhang's defeat meant that he fell out of the top 16 in the world rankings after the event, falling from 15th to 23rd as his prize money from winning the 2023 event no longer counted towards his ranking.

Facing Highfield, the defending champion Ding made back-to-back centuries of 131 and 138 as he took a 5–1 lead. Highfield won three consecutive frames, but Ding secured a 6–4 victory with an 85 break. Murphy made a century of 140 as he defeated Slessor 6–4, and Selby compiled a century of 132 as he beat Daniel Wells 6–3. Yuan Sijun took a 2–1 lead over Neil Robertson, but Robertson won five of the next six frames for a 6–3 victory. Jiang made a 135 break as he took a 5–3 lead over He Guoqiang, but He made back-to-back centuries of 109 and 118 to tie the scores at 5–5. Jiang won the decider to progress. Scott Donaldson made a century of 132 as he beat Un-Nooh 6–4.

=== Round four (last 16) ===
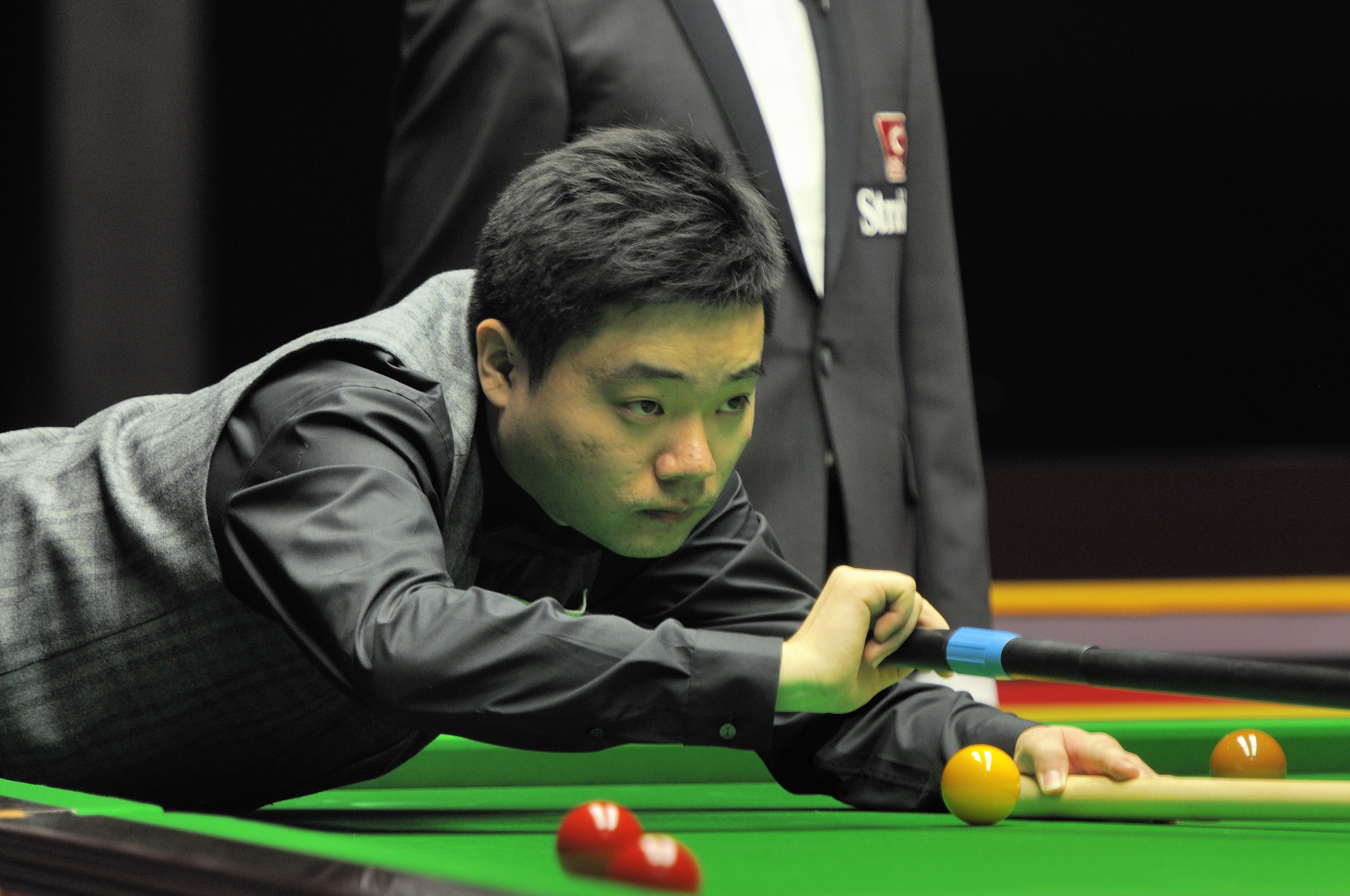
The defending champion Ding Junhui (pictured in 2014) lost to Shaun Murphy.

Facing Wu, the world number one Trump won the first four frames. Wu then won six consecutive frames, making breaks of 62, 109, 88, 92, 86, and 80 as he secured a 6–4, reaching his seventh ranking quarter-final. Trump scored only 18 points in the last six frames of the match. "I attacked really well today," Wu said afterwards. "I barely made any mistakes and once I was given opportunities I just took them." Playing Lisowski, Hawkins made breaks including 123, 91, and 132 as he also won the first four frames. After the mid-session interval, Lisowski produced three consecutive centuries of 141, 100, and 103 and went on to tie the scores at 4–4. However, Hawkins won the last two frames of the match for a 6–4 victory.

Zhao made five half-centuries in his 6–1 win over Si, reaching his first ranking quarter-final since winning the World Championship six months earlier. Selby made two centuries of 134 and 115 as he beat Anthony McGill by the same score. Murphy made breaks of 104 and 81 as he took a 3–0 lead over the defending champion Ding and added further breaks of 114, 86, and 67 as he secured a 6–2 victory. "The crowd were fantastic," Murphy said afterwards. "They were very respectful and cheered my good shots as well as Ding's good shots." Higgins came from 4–5 down to defeat Donaldson in a deciding frame, while Maguire advanced with a 6–4 win over Jiang. Surety made breaks of 64, 67, and 70 as he won the first three frames against Neil Robertson. Although Robertson took frame four with a century of 137, Surety extended his lead to 5–1 with breaks of 81 and 80. Robertson won the next two frames, but Surety made a 78 break in the ninth frame to win 6–3 and reach the second ranking quarter-final of his career.

=== Quarter-finals ===
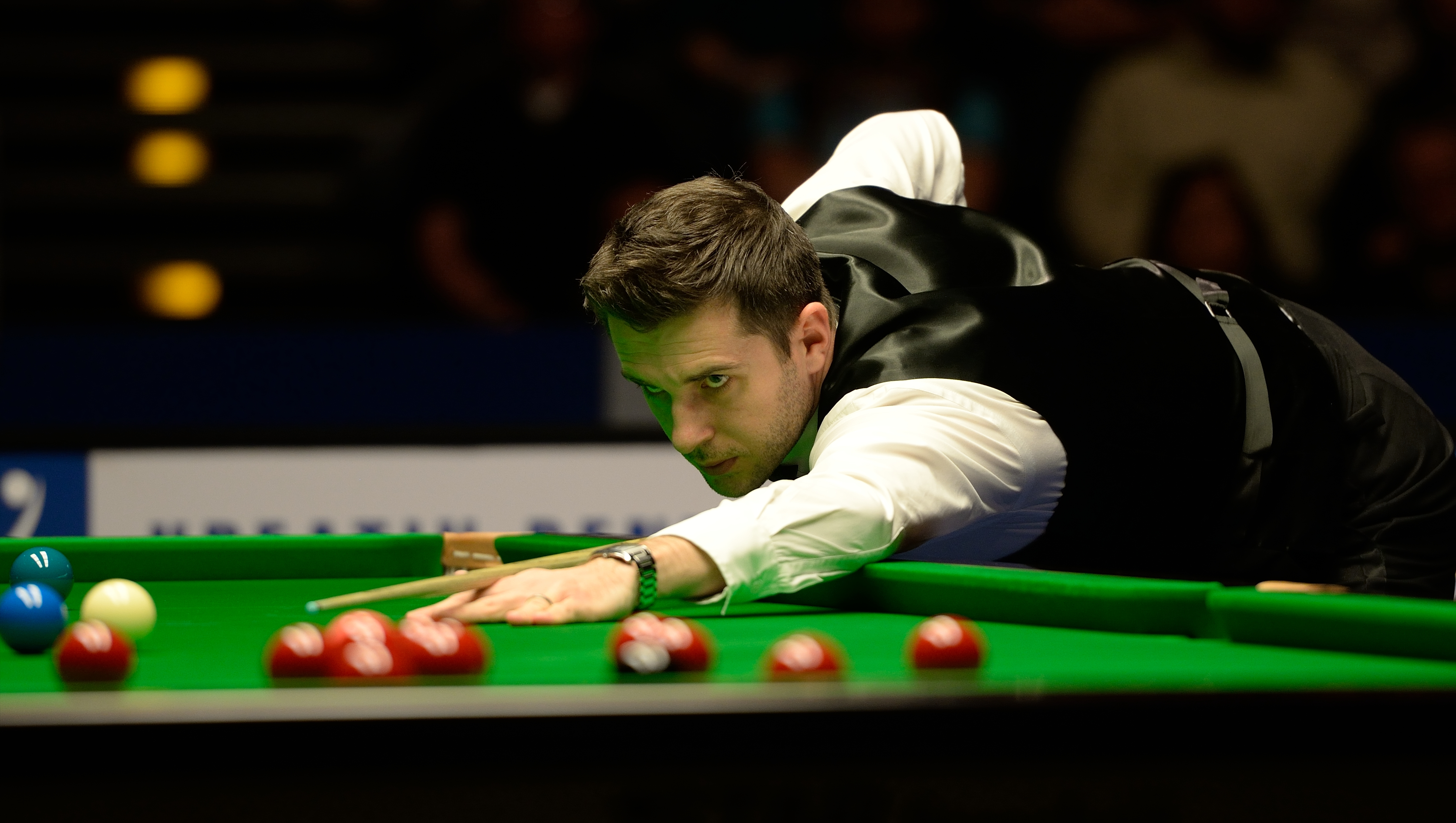
Two-time winner Mark Selby (pictured in 2015) lost in a deciding frame to the reigning World Champion Zhao Xintong.

Wu made breaks of 66, 64, 73, 85, 111, and 86 as he whitewashed Hawkins, who produced only one half-century break in the match. Wu advanced to the fifth ranking semi-final of his career, having won 12 consecutive frames at the tournament, all with breaks over 60. Selby, who had won the title in 2016 and 2017, played Zhao. Selby made breaks of 55, 78, 118, and 107 as he moved into a 4–2 lead, but Zhao won three consecutive frames with breaks of 68, 97, and 55 to go 5–4 in front. Selby tied the scores at 5–5 with an 81 break, but Zhao won the decider with a 63 break. It was the first time Zhao had beaten Selby in their six professional meetings. "That was unbelievable," Zhao said afterwards. "It was my first time beating Mark Selby and I had to come back from behind. I am so proud of myself."

Facing Murphy, Higgins made breaks of 77, 112, and 67 as he took a 3–1 lead at the mid-session interval. Murphy won the fifth frame with a century of 137, but Higgins then won three consecutive frames, making another century of 116 in frame seven, to complete a 6–2 victory and reach his 90th ranking semi-final. "It was all about me today," Higgins said afterwards. "I had to play at the top of my game to have a chance against [Murphy]. I felt I did that. My safety was pretty good and when I got my chances I scored pretty well. When I play these top guys now I've got to be on my game to win." Surety took the first frame against Maguire, but Maguire then won six consecutive frames, making breaks including 50, 94, and 59, winning the match 6–1 and reaching his 38th ranking semi-final.

=== Semi-finals ===
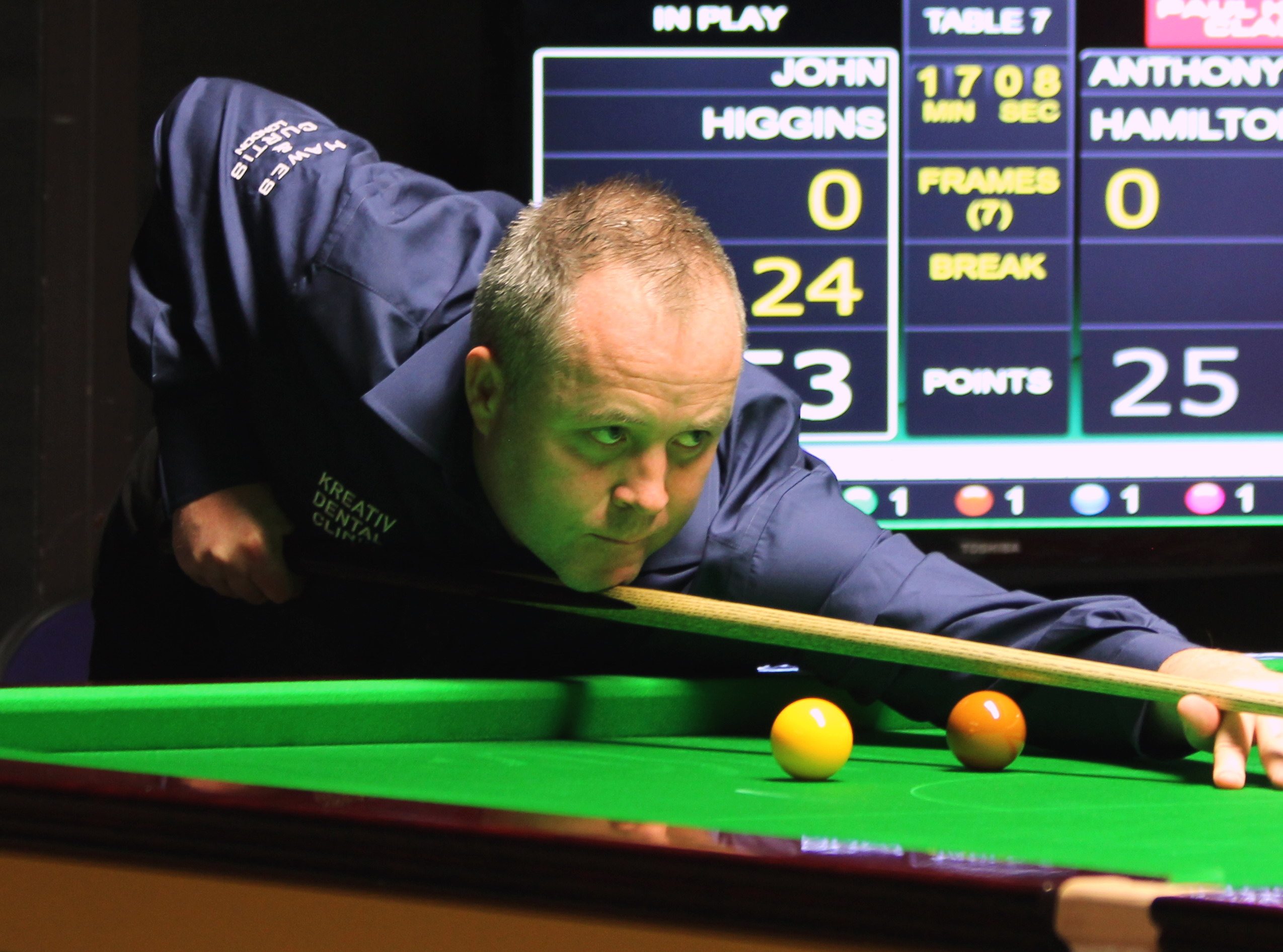
John Higgins (pictured in 2015) defeated Stephen Maguire to reach the 59th ranking final of his professional career.

The semi-finals were played as the best of 17 frames, held over two sessions. Zhao led 2–1 but Wu won three consecutive frames, making a century of 140 in frame four, as he moved 4–2 ahead. Zhao won frame seven and then came from behind to take the eighth with a break of 72, tying the scores at 4–4 after the first session. Wu won the first four frames of the second session, making breaks including 108 and 71 as he moved one from victory at 8–4. Zhao took the next two with breaks of 81 and 50, but Wu completed a 9–6 win with a 65 break. "I didn't think I could actually beat him," Wu said afterwards. "In fact, as soon as the second session began, I felt a lot of pressure. He missed a brown ball I didn't expect in the ninth frame.... It was a turning point."

In the second semi-final, Higgins faced Maguire, the first time they had met in professional competition since 2019. Higgins made breaks including 67, 71, 101, 137, and 97 as he won the first six frames. Maguire, who had won the 2025 Championship League earlier in the season, took frame seven with a century of 114 and also won frame eight to leave Higgins leading 6–2 after the first session. When play resumed, Higgins won three consecutive frames, making breaks including 93 and 84, as he completed a 9–2 victory. It was his fifth consecutive win over Maguire, who had not defeated Higgins since 2014. Commenting on reaching his third ranking final of the calendar year, after winning the 2025 World Open and 2025 Tour Championship, Higgins said: "It was pivotal to win the World Open. It gave me that bit of self-belief in my game. It doesn't matter who you are, when you start losing that self-belief the game becomes so difficult. Especially when it comes to getting over the winning line. To make it concrete in my mind and say I was a winner again took the pressure off."

=== Final ===
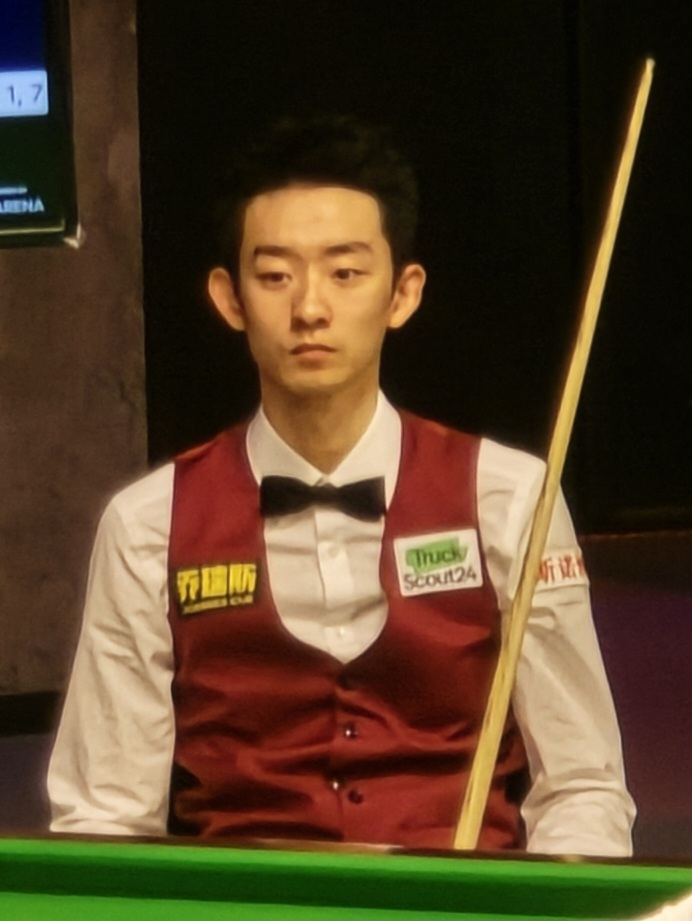
Wu Yize (pictured in 2025) defeated John Higgins to win his maiden ranking title and enter the top 16 for the first time.

The final was played as the best of 19 frames, held over two sessions, between the world number 6 John Higgins and the world number 22 Wu Yize. Higgins was contesting his 59th ranking final and Wu his 3rd. The players had previously met in the held-over qualifiers at the 2019 event when Wu was a 15-year-old amateur; on that occasion, Higgins recovered from 4–5 behind to win 6–5. The age difference between 50-year-old Higgins and 22-year-old Wu was the fourth-largest of any ranking final in professional snooker history. The largest age difference had been recorded at the 2005 UK Championship final when 48-year-old Steve Davis played 18-year-old Ding.

Wu won the opening two frames with breaks of 86 and 62. Higgins took frame three with a century of 101, but Wu made back-to-back centuries of 110 and 113 as he moved 4–1 ahead. Higgins won frame six, but Wu took the seventh with a century of 137 to lead 5–2. Higgins won frame eight on the last pink and came from behind to win frame nine with a 46 break, reducing Wu's lead to 5–4 at the end of the first session. When play resumed, Wu won frame 10 with an 87 break. In frame 11, Higgins was leading when he missed a pot on the brown to a baulk pocket. Wu made a double and went on to produce a clearance of 43, including potting the last green along the baulk cushion, to win the frame on the last black. Wu attempted a maximum break in frame 12 but missed a double on the 11th red, ending the break at 80 but increasing his lead to four frames at 8–4. Higgins won frame 13, but Wu took the next to move one from victory at 9–5. Higgins won frame 15 with a 53 break after Wu missed a red while playing with the rest, but Wu potted a long red from Higgins's break-off in frame 16 and went on to secure a 10–6 victory with a 108 break, his fourth century of the final and fourteenth of the tournament. The five centuries made in the final took the overall number of centuries at the event to a new record of 160, surpassing the 155 made at the 2023 event.

Wu won the maiden ranking title of his four-year professional career, following defeats in the finals of the 2024 English Open and the 2024 Scottish Open. He advanced from 22nd to 13th in the world rankings after the event, entering the top 16 for the first time and qualifying automatically for the final stages of the 2025 UK Championship, displacing Wakelin. Wu became the ninth different player from mainland China to win a ranking title. "Honestly, it feels unbelievable," he said after the match. "It has been a long wait since reaching the final at the Scottish Open and the English Open last year. At times I honestly felt quite desperate, but deep down I always believed I had the ability to win a title. Every day I kept thinking about it. I had a strong will to lift a trophy. That belief carried me through this week." He paid tribute to the support he had received from his parents during his career. Runner-up Higgins said he had been "nowhere near good enough" during the match and was "disappointed" with his play, but he praised his opponent, saying: "[Wu] was striking the ball beautifully. He was by far the better player. It reminded me so much of playing Paul Hunter. The way he gets through the ball and gets so much action on it. He is a brilliant player."

== Main draw ==
The draw for the tournament is shown below. Numbers in parentheses after the players' names denote the top 32 seeded players, an "(a)" indicates amateur players not on the World Snooker Tour, and players in bold denote match winners.

=== Top half ===
**Last 64**; Best of 11 frames
**Ding Junhui (CHN) (1)**	**6**
Michael Holt (ENG)	1
Pang Junxu (CHN) (28)	4
**Liam Highfield (ENG)**	**6**
**Shaun Murphy (ENG) (16)**	**6**
Wang Xinzhong (CHN) (a)	5
**Elliot Slessor (ENG) (23)**	**6**
Ben Mertens (BEL)	5
**Thepchaiya Un-Nooh** (THA)	**w/o**
David Gilbert (ENG) (24) (Note: David Gilbert withdrew for personal reasons and so Thepchaiya Un-Nooh was given a walkover to the last 32.)	w/d
**Scott Donaldson (SCO)**	**6**
Mitchell Mann (ENG)	2
Ryan Day (WAL)	4
**Hossein Vafaei (IRN) (26)**	**6**
Oliver Lines (ENG)	2
**John Higgins (SCO) (8)**	**6**
**Neil Robertson** (AUS) (5)	**w/o**
Ken Doherty (IRL) (Note: Ken Doherty withdrew due to illness and so Neil Robertson was given a walkover to the last 32.)	w/d
**Yuan Sijun (CHN) (31)**	**6**
Ricky Walden (ENG)	4
Xiao Guodong (CHN) (10)	1
**Zak Surety (ENG)**	**6**
Ali Carter (ENG) (18) (Note: Ali Carter withdrew for personal reasons and so Aaron Hill was given a walkover to the last 32.)	w/d
**Aaron Hill** (IRL)	**w/o**
**He Guoqiang (CHN)**	**6**
Stuart Bingham (ENG) (22)	4
**Jiang Jun (CHN)**	**6**
Chris Wakelin (ENG) (14)	2
Xu Si (CHN)	4
**Stephen Maguire (SCO) (25)**	**6**
David Lilley (ENG)	2
**Kyren Wilson (ENG) (4)**	**6**

**Last 32**; Best of 11 frames
**(China) Ding Junhui (1)**	**6**
(England) Liam Highfield	4
**(England) Shaun Murphy (16)**	**6**
(England) Elliot Slessor (23)	4
(Thailand) Thepchaiya Un-Nooh	4
**(Scotland) Scott Donaldson**	**6**
(Iran) Hossein Vafaei (26)	3
**(Scotland) John Higgins (8)**	**6**
**(Australia) Neil Robertson (5)**	**6**
(China) Yuan Sijun (31)	3
**(England) Zak Surety**	**6**
(Republic of Ireland) Aaron Hill	5
(China) He Guoqiang	5
**(China) Jiang Jun**	**6**
**(Scotland) Stephen Maguire (25)**	**6**
(England) Kyren Wilson (4)	4

**Last 16**; Best of 11 frames
(China) Ding Junhui (1)	2
**(England) Shaun Murphy (16)**	**6**
(Scotland) Scott Donaldson	5
**(Scotland) John Higgins (8)**	**6**
(Australia) Neil Robertson (5)	3
**(England) Zak Surety**	**6**
(China) Jiang Jun	4
**(Scotland) Stephen Maguire (25)**	**6**

**Quarter-finals**; Best of 11 frames
(England) Shaun Murphy (16)	2
**(Scotland) John Higgins (8)**	**6**
(England) Zak Surety	1
**(Scotland) Stephen Maguire (25)**	**6**

**Semi-finals**; Best of 17 frames
**(Scotland) John Higgins (8)**	**9**
(Scotland) Stephen Maguire (25)	2

Note: w/d=withdrawn; w/o=walkover

=== Bottom half ===
**Last 64**; Best of 11 frames
**Judd Trump (ENG) (3)**	**6**
Matthew Stevens (WAL)	3
Zhou Yuelong (CHN) (30)	4
**Noppon Saengkham (THA)**	**6**
**Zhang Anda (CHN) (13)**	**6**
Michał Szubarczyk (POL)	0
**Wu Yize (CHN) (19)**	**6**
Lyu Haotian (CHN)	1
Ben Woollaston (ENG)	1
**Jak Jones (WAL) (20)**	**6**
Huang Jiahao (CHN)	5
**Barry Hawkins (ENG) (12)**	**6**
Louis Heathcote (ENG)	4
**Jack Lisowski (ENG) (29)**	**6**
Sanderson Lam (ENG)	2
**Ronnie O'Sullivan (ENG) (6)**	**6**
Mark Williams (WAL) (7) (Note: Mark Williams withdrew due to illness and so Anthony McGill was given a walkover to the last 32.)	w/d
**Anthony McGill** (SCO)	**w/o**
Sam Craigie (ENG) (Note: Sam Craigie withdrew for medical reasons and so Jimmy Robertson was given a walkover to the last 32.)	w/d
**Jimmy Robertson** (ENG)	**w/o**
**Mark Selby (ENG) (11)**	**6**
Liu Hongyu (CHN)	5
Tom Ford (ENG) (21)	3
**Daniel Wells (WAL)**	**6**
Martin O'Donnell (ENG)	1
**Gary Wilson (ENG) (17)**	**6**
Wang Yuchen (HKG)	1
**Si Jiahui (CHN) (15)**	**6**
Liu Wenwei (CHN)	2
**Lei Peifan (CHN) (32)**	**6**
Fan Zhengyi (CHN)	3
**Zhao Xintong (CHN) (2)**	**6**

**Last 32**; Best of 11 frames
**(England) Judd Trump (3)**	**6**
(Thailand) Noppon Saengkham	3
(China) Zhang Anda (13)	3
**(China) Wu Yize (19)**	**6**
(Wales) Jak Jones (20)	3
**(England) Barry Hawkins (12)**	**6**
**(England) Jack Lisowski (29)**	**6**
(England) Ronnie O'Sullivan (6)	5
**(Scotland) Anthony McGill**	**6**
(England) Jimmy Robertson	4
**(England) Mark Selby (11)**	**6**
(Wales) Daniel Wells	3
(England) Gary Wilson (17)	0
**(China) Si Jiahui (15)**	**6**
(China) Lei Peifan (32)	5
**(China) Zhao Xintong (2)**	**6**

**Last 16**; Best of 11 frames
(England) Judd Trump (3)	4
**(China) Wu Yize (19)**	**6**
**(England) Barry Hawkins (12)**	**6**
(England) Jack Lisowski (29)	4
(Scotland) Anthony McGill	1
**(England) Mark Selby (11)**	**6**
(China) Si Jiahui (15)	1
**(China) Zhao Xintong (2)**	**6**

**Quarter-finals**; Best of 11 frames
**(China) Wu Yize (19)**	**6**
(England) Barry Hawkins (12)	0
(England) Mark Selby (11)	5
**(China) Zhao Xintong (2)**	**6**

**Semi-finals**; Best of 17 frames
**(China) Wu Yize (19)**	**9**
(China) Zhao Xintong (2)	6

Note: w/d=withdrawn; w/o=walkover

=== Final: frame scores ===
Final: Best of 19 frames. Referee: Wang Haitao; Nanjing, China, 9 November 2025
John Higgins (8); Scotland	6–**10**	**Wu Yize** (19); China
Afternoon: 19–**99**, 0–**71**, **135**–0 (101), 0–**117** (110), 0–**113** (113), **67**–19, 0–**137** (137), **58**–40, **61**–39; Evening: 6–**91**, 59–**70**, 0–**80**, **72**–4, 16–**76**, **69**–20, 0–**108** (108)
(frame 3) 101	Highest break	**137** (frame 7)
1	Century breaks	**4**

== Qualifying ==
Qualification for the tournament took place from 30 September to 2 October 2025 at the Ponds Forge International Sports Centre in Sheffield, England. An "(a)" indicates amateur players not on the World Snooker Tour.

=== Nanjing ===
The results of the held-over qualifying matches played in Nanjing were as follows:

- Bai Yulu (CHN) 4–6 Wang Xinzhong (CHN) (a) (Note: Pre-qualification match to determine who would play Robbie Williams.)
- Ding Junhui (CHN) 6–0 David Grace (ENG)
- Robbie Williams (ENG) 1–6 Wang Xinzhong (CHN) (a)
- Thepchaiya Un-Nooh (THA) 6–0 Xu Jiarui (CHN) (a)
- Xiao Guodong (CHN) 6–2 Mahmoud El Hareedy (EGY)
- Judd Trump (ENG) 6–4 Dylan Emery (WAL)
- Zhou Yuelong (CHN) 6–4 Wang Xinbo (CHN) (a)
- Barry Hawkins (ENG) 6–4 Zhou Jinhao (CHN) (a)
- Ronnie O'Sullivan (ENG) 6–5 Allan Taylor (ENG)
- Zhao Xintong (CHN) 6–1 Oliver Brown (ENG)

=== Sheffield ===
The results of the qualifying matches played in Sheffield were as follows:

- Long Zehuang (CHN) 4–6 Jiang Jun (CHN)
- John Higgins (SCO) 6–5 Liam Pullen (ENG)
- Xu Si (CHN) 6–3 Sahil Nayyar (CAN)
- Robert Milkins (ENG) 5–6 Wang Yuchen (HKG)
- Yuan Sijun (CHN) 6–2 Julien Leclercq (BEL)
- Si Jiahui (CHN) 6–3 Sunny Akani (THA)
- Neil Robertson (AUS) 6–1 Umut Dikme (GER) (a) (Note: Umut Dikme replaced Marco Fu, who withdrew due to a fractured elbow.)
- Matthew Selt (ENG) 3–6 Ben Mertens (BEL)
- David Lilley (ENG) 6–3 Chatchapong Nasa (THA)
- Jack Lisowski (ENG) 6–2 Bulcsú Révész (HUN)
- Mark Selby (ENG) 6–0 Steven Hallworth (ENG)
- Jak Jones (WAL) 6–1 Mateusz Baranowski (POL)
- Lyu Haotian (CHN) 6–1 Ng On-yee (HKG)
- Ben Woollaston (ENG) 6–3 Cheung Ka Wai (HKG)
- Anthony McGill (SCO) 6–0 Mink Nutcharut (THA)
- Kyren Wilson (ENG) 6–2 Gong Chenzhi (CHN)
- Martin O'Donnell (ENG) 6–5 Xu Yichen (CHN)
- Mark Williams (WAL) 6–2 Iulian Boiko (UKR)
- Fan Zhengyi (CHN) 6–1 Hatem Yassen (EGY)
- Stan Moody (ENG) 5–6 Ken Doherty (IRL)
- Luca Brecel (BEL) 4–6 Liu Wenwei (CHN)
- Ricky Walden (ENG) 6–1 Gao Yang (CHN)
- Lei Peifan (CHN) 6–3 Haris Tahir (PAK)
- Wu Yize (CHN) 6–3 Lan Yuhao (CHN)
- Mark Allen (NIR) 4–6 Mitchell Mann (ENG)
- Mark Davis (ENG) 5–6 Huang Jiahao (CHN)
- Jimmy Robertson (ENG) 6–3 Chang Bingyu (CHN)
- Pang Junxu (CHN) 6–1 Ross Muir (SCO)
- Stuart Bingham (ENG) 6–3 Ian Burns (ENG)
- Noppon Saengkham (THA) 6–1 Jonas Luz (BRA)
- Zak Surety (ENG) 6–2 Farakh Ajaib (PAK)
- Elliot Slessor (ENG) 6–2 Alexander Ursenbacher (SWI)
- Hossein Vafaei (IRN) 6–1 Fergal Quinn (NIR)
- Jackson Page (WAL) 5–6 Liam Highfield (ENG)
- Joe O'Connor (ENG) 1–6 Sam Craigie (ENG)
- David Gilbert (ENG) 6–5 Liam Davies (WAL)
- Stephen Maguire (SCO) 6–5 Kreishh Gurbaxani (IND)
- Shaun Murphy (ENG) 6–1 Yao Pengcheng (CHN)
- Matthew Stevens (WAL) 6–2 Connor Benzey (ENG)
- Ishpreet Singh Chadha (IND) 4–6 Michał Szubarczyk (POL)
- Sanderson Lam (ENG) 6–0 Amir Sarkhosh (IRN)
- Scott Donaldson (SCO) 6–0 Antoni Kowalski (POL)
- Liu Hongyu (CHN) 6–1 Haydon Pinhey (ENG)
- He Guoqiang (CHN) 6–3 Duane Jones (WAL)
- Ryan Day (WAL) 6–3 Zhao Hanyang (CHN)
- Zhang Anda (CHN) 6–3 Chris Totten (SCO)
- Chris Wakelin (ENG) 6–1 Florian Nüßle (AUT)
- Aaron Hill (IRL) 6–1 Leone Crowley (IRL)
- Daniel Wells (WAL) 6–2 Jimmy White (ENG)
- Gary Wilson (ENG) 6–3 Artemijs Žižins (LAT)
- Jordan Brown (NIR) 2–6 Oliver Lines (ENG)
- Michael Holt (ENG) 6–2 Reanne Evans (ENG)
- Jamie Jones (WAL) 2–6 Louis Heathcote (ENG)
- Ali Carter (ENG) 6–0 Liam Graham (SCO)
- Tom Ford (ENG) 6–1 Robbie McGuigan (NIR)

== Century breaks ==
=== Main stage centuries ===
A total of 123 century breaks were made during the main stage of the tournament in Nanjing.

- 147, 139, 102 – Zak Surety
- 145, 100 – Jimmy Robertson
- 145 – Bai Yulu
- 141, 130, 127, 115, 113, 103, 103, 100 – Jack Lisowski
- 141, 103, 101 – Elliot Slessor
- 141 – Wang Xinbo
- 140, 137, 137, 132, 119, 114, 113, 113, 111, 110, 109, 108, 108 – Wu Yize
- 140, 137, 114, 104, 102 – Shaun Murphy
- 138, 134, 131, 116, 115, 112, 104, 102 – Ding Junhui
- 138, 110 – Si Jiahui
- 137, 134, 110 – Hossein Vafaei
- 137, 132, 123, 102, 102, 102 – Barry Hawkins
- 137, 120 – Dylan Emery
- 137, 116, 112, 110, 101, 101 – John Higgins
- 137, 112 – Neil Robertson
- 137 – Ben Woollaston
- 136, 100 – Zhang Anda
- 136 – Louis Heathcote
- 135, 111 – Zhao Xintong
- 135, 108, 101 – Jiang Jun
- 134, 132, 118, 115, 107 – Mark Selby
- 134, 131, 111 – Zhou Yuelong
- 132, 116 – Thepchaiya Un-Nooh
- 132, 109, 108 – Jak Jones
- 132, 102 – Scott Donaldson
- 132 – Martin O'Donnell
- 130, 110 – Huang Jiahao
- 129, 128, 119, 106, 103, 100 – Ronnie O'Sullivan
- 123, 118, 109, 102 – He Guoqiang
- 120, 118, 116 – Lei Peifan
- 119, 115, 105 – Judd Trump
- 117, 102 – Liam Highfield
- 116, 114, 110, 104 – Stephen Maguire
- 116 – Sanderson Lam
- 114 – Stuart Bingham
- 107 – Tom Ford
- 105, 100 – Wang Xinzhong
- 104 – Daniel Wells
- 101 – Yuan Sijun
- 100 – Gary Wilson
- 100 – Kyren Wilson

=== Qualifying stage centuries ===
A total of 37 century breaks were made during the qualifying stage of the tournament in Sheffield.

- 147, 133 – Gary Wilson
- 135 – Lan Yuhao
- 132, 124 – Ben Mertens
- 131, 124 – Mark Selby
- 131 – Chang Bingyu
- 128, 101 – Jack Lisowski
- 128 – Sam Craigie
- 128 – Jamie Jones
- 125 – David Gilbert
- 123 – Artemijs Žižins
- 122 – Elliot Slessor
- 120 – Shaun Murphy
- 118, 107 – Yuan Sijun
- 115 – Oliver Lines
- 113 – Gao Yang
- 113 – Matthew Stevens
- 113 – Mark Williams
- 110 – Michael Holt
- 109, 107 – Jak Jones
- 109 – Louis Heathcote
- 109 – Jimmy Robertson
- 106 – He Guoqiang
- 105, 102 – Daniel Wells
- 105 – Ali Carter
- 105 – Neil Robertson
- 103 – Scott Donaldson
- 101 – Jordan Brown
- 100 – Ryan Day
- 100 – Kyren Wilson
- 100 – Wu Yize
