= Sanderson Lam =

English snooker player

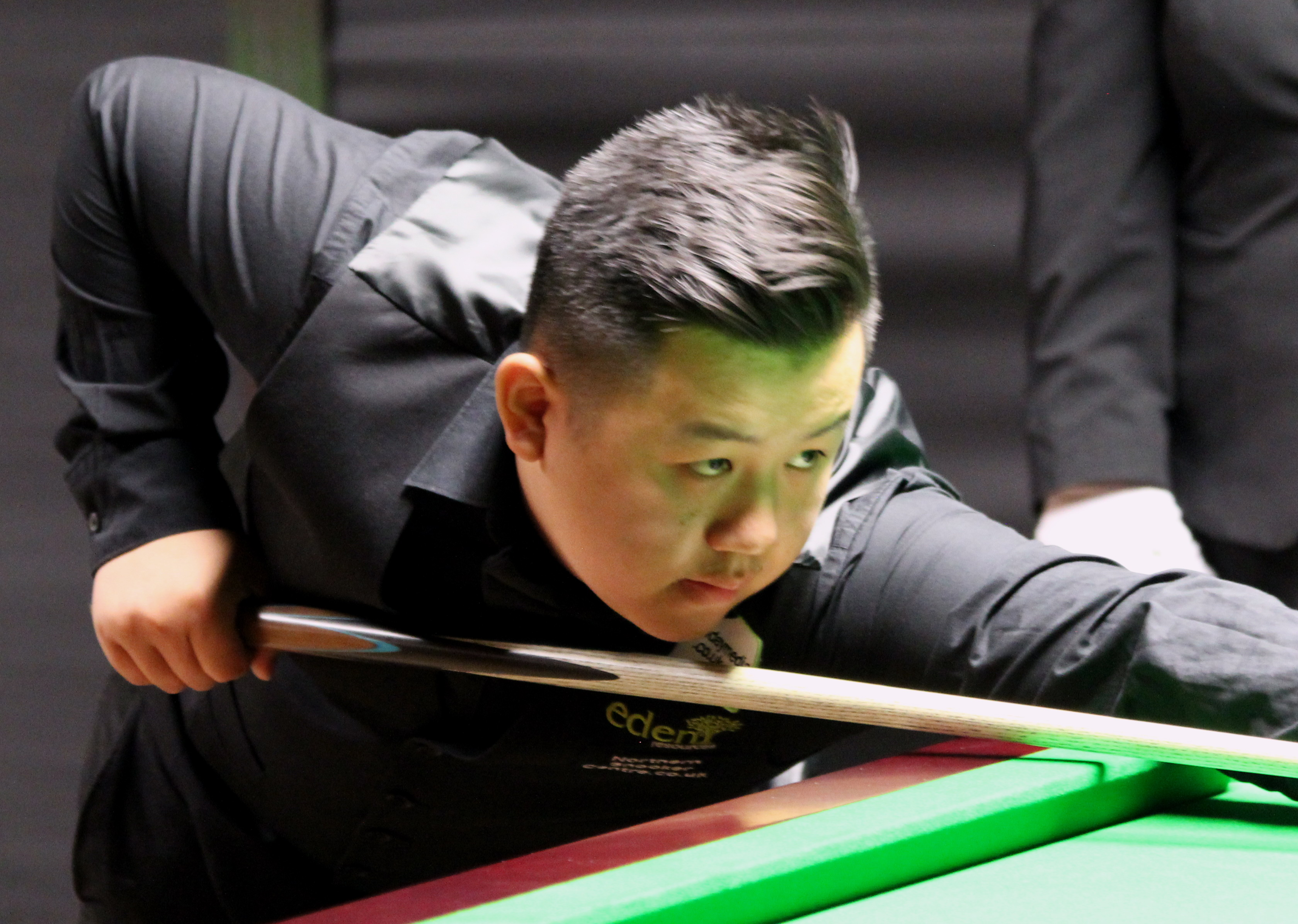
- Lam at the 2016 Paul Hunter Classic

Personal information
- Nickname: The Panda
- Born: 28 January 1994 (age 32) Leeds, England

Sport
- Country: England
- Sport: Snooker
- Professional: 2015–2019, 2022–2026
- Highest ranking: 57 (December 2024)
- Best ranking finish: Quarter-final (2023 Scottish Open)

Sanderson Lam (Chinese: 林杉峰) (born 28 January 1994) is an English former professional snooker player.

== Early life ==
Lam was born to Chinese parents in Leeds, England. His parents moved to England in the 1980s.

== Career ==
In 2011, Lam started to take part in the Players Tour Championship, a tournament series for professionals and amateurs. In the first three tournaments in England, he lost the first match in each case, but at the 2011 Paul Hunter Classic in Fürth, he secured two victories in the qualifying rounds and played Mark Williams where he was defeated 4–0. Over the next year, he participated in a further four tournaments. Following the end of the season he entered Q School where he reached the semi-finals of his group before losing to Elliot Slessor who went on to secure qualification for the main tour.

In the 2014–15 season, he was able to improve in the PTC tournaments and succeeded in qualifying for the EBSA Qualifying Tour play-offs. There, he was able to prevail among the 16 participants, and win one of the two main tour places after defeating TJ Dowling 4–2 in the final round. As a result, Lam was given a two-year card on the professional World Snooker Tour for the 2015–16 and 2016–17 seasons.

Lam defeated David Morris 6–3 to qualify for the 2015 International Championship. On his venue stage ranking event debut, he thrashed Michael Wild 6–0, but then failed to pick up a frame himself in the second round against Zhou Yuelong. Lam lost all eight matches he played after this. Wins over Wang Yuchen and Alan McManus with the loss of a single frame helped Lam progress to the third round of the Northern Ireland Open, where he was ousted 4–1 by Hossein Vafaei. At the Gibraltar Open, he eliminated Wang 4–3, Noppon Saengkham and Peter Ebdon both 4–1 to reach the last 16 of a ranking event for the first time, where he would be on the wrong end of a 4–1 scoreline against Judd Trump. Lam squeezed past Mark King 5–4 at the China Open, before losing 5–2 to Kyren Wilson in the second round and he needed to have a successful Q School campaign in order to avoid being relegated from the tour. A 4–2 victory over Joe Swail in the final round of the second event earned him a new two-year tour card.

== Personal life ==
While Lam speaks English as his first language, he can also speak Chinese languages, though not fluently. He remarked "I was born over here but as soon as they see I am Chinese, they think I can speak fluently. It’s a shock." "I can speak Chinese, but not fluently. I am still trying to learn a lot. I have got quite a strong Leeds accent, a deep voice, so when I talk in China, they can’t understand the accent."

== Performance and rankings timeline ==
Tournament	2013/ 14	2014/ 15	2015/ 16	2016/ 17	2017/ 18	2018/ 19	2021/ 22	2022/ 23	2023/ 24	2024/ 25	2025/ 26
Ranking (Note: It shows the ranking at the beginning of the season)	(Note: He was an amateur)		(Note: New players on the Main Tour don't have a ranking)	77	(Note: Players qualified through Q School started the season without prize money ranking points)	92			75	62	60
Ranking tournaments
Championship League	Non-Ranking Event						RR	RR	2R	RR	RR
Saudi Arabia Masters	Tournament Not Held									3R	4R
Wuhan Open	Tournament Not Held								1R	1R	LQ
English Open	Not Held			1R	1R	1R	LQ	LQ	2R	LQ	1R
British Open	Tournament Not Held						1R	LQ	2R	LQ	1R
Xi'an Grand Prix	Tournament Not Held									LQ	LQ
Northern Ireland Open	Not Held			3R	1R	3R	LQ	LQ	LQ	LQ	LQ
International Championship	A	A	2R	LQ	1R	LQ	Not Held		1R	1R	1R
UK Championship	1R	A	1R	1R	1R	1R	1R	LQ	LQ	LQ	LQ
Shoot Out	Non-Ranking Event			1R	1R	1R	3R	1R	3R	1R	3R
Scottish Open	Not Held			1R	1R	1R	1R	LQ	QF	LQ	LQ
German Masters	LQ	A	LQ	LQ	LQ	LQ	LQ	LQ	LQ	LQ	LQ
World Grand Prix	NH	NR	DNQ	DNQ	DNQ	DNQ	DNQ	DNQ	DNQ	DNQ	DNQ
Players Championship (Note: The event was called the Players Tour Championship Grand Final (2013/2014–2015/2016))	DNQ	DNQ	DNQ	DNQ	DNQ	DNQ	DNQ	DNQ	DNQ	DNQ	DNQ
Welsh Open	1R	A	1R	1R	1R	1R	LQ	2R	1R	3R	LQ
World Open	WR	Not Held		A	LQ	LQ	Not Held		1R	LQ	LQ
Tour Championship	Tournament Not Held					DNQ	DNQ	DNQ	DNQ	DNQ	DNQ
World Championship	LQ	A	LQ	LQ	LQ	LQ	LQ	LQ	LQ	LQ	LQ
Former ranking tournaments
Wuxi Classic	LQ	A	Tournament Not Held								
Australian Goldfields Open	LQ	LQ	LQ	Tournament Not Held							
Shanghai Masters	LQ	A	LQ	LQ	1R	NR	Not Held		Non-Ranking Event		
Riga Masters (Note: The event was called the Riga Open (2014/2015–2015/2016))	NH	Minor-Ranking		LQ	LQ	LQ	Tournament Not Held				
Paul Hunter Classic	Minor-Ranking Event			2R	1R	1R	Tournament Not Held				
China Championship	Not Held			NR	LQ	LQ	Tournament Not Held				
Indian Open	LQ	LQ	NH	LQ	LQ	LQ	Tournament Not Held				
China Open	LQ	A	LQ	2R	LQ	LQ	Tournament Not Held				
Turkish Masters	Tournament Not Held						LQ	Tournament Not Held			
Gibraltar Open	Not Held		MR	4R	1R	1R	3R	Tournament Not Held			
WST Classic	Tournament Not Held							1R	Not Held		
European Masters	Not Held			LQ	LQ	LQ	LQ	1R	1R	Not Held	
Former non-ranking tournaments
Six-red World Championship	A	A	A	A	A	A	NH	LQ	Not Held		

Performance Table Legend
LQ	lost in the qualifying draw	#R	lost in the early rounds of the tournament (WR = Wildcard round, RR = Round robin)	QF	lost in the quarter-finals
SF	lost in the semi-finals	F	lost in the final	W	won the tournament
DNQ	did not qualify for the tournament	A	did not participate in the tournament	WD	withdrew from the tournament

NH / Not Held	means an event was not held.
NR / Non-Ranking Event	means an event is/was no longer a ranking event.
R / Ranking Event	means an event is/was a ranking event.
MR / Minor-Ranking Event	means an event is/was a minor-ranking event.

== Career finals ==
=== Amateur finals: 1 (1 title) ===
Outcome	No.	Year	Championship	Opponent in the final	Score
Winner	1.	2026	Q Tour - Event 1	(Pakistan) Farakh Ajaib	4–1

=== Team finals: 1 (1 title) ===
Outcome	No.	Year	Championship	Team/partner	Opponent in the final	Score
Winner	1.	2017	World Women's Snooker Mixed Doubles Championship	(Hong Kong) Katrina Wan	(England) Dylan Mitchell (England) Rebecca Kenna	3–1
