= 2024 International Championship =

Snooker tournament, held in China

Tournament information
- Dates: 3–10 November 2024
- Venue: SNCNFC
- City: Nanjing
- Country: China
- Organisation: World Snooker Tour
- Format: Ranking event
- Total prize fund: £825,000
- Winner's share: £175,000
- Highest break: Xu Si (CHN) (147)

Final
- Champion: Ding Junhui (CHN)
- Runner-up: Chris Wakelin (ENG)
- Score: 10–7

The 2024 International Championship was a professional snooker tournament that took place from 3 to 10 November 2024 at the South New City National Fitness Center (SNCNFC) in Nanjing, China. The eighth ranking event of the 2024‍–‍25 season, it followed the 2024 Northern Ireland Open and preceded the 2024 UK Championship. The winner received £175,000 from a total prize fund of £825,000.

Qualifiers took place from 30 September to 2 October 2024 at the Ponds Forge International Sports Centre in Sheffield, England. Qualifying matches featuring the defending champion (Zhang Anda); the reigning World Champion (Kyren Wilson); the two highest ranked Chinese players other than Zhang (Ding Junhui and Si Jiahui); four Chinese wildcards (Zhou Jinhao, Wang Xinbo, Cai Wei, and Zheng Dian); and Ronnie O'Sullivan were held over to be played in Nanjing.

Zhang won the 2023 event, defeating Tom Ford 10‍–‍6 in the final to capture his maiden ranking title. However, Zhang lost 1‍–‍6 to Lyu Haotian in the last 32. Ding won the tournament, defeating Chris Wakelin 10‍–‍7 in the final to claim the 15th ranking title of his career; it was his first ranking event win since the 2019 UK Championship almost five years earlier. Following the event, Wakelin entered the top 16 in the world rankings for the first time in his career. The event produced 135 century breaks, 42 during qualifying and 93 during the main stage. The highest was a maximum break by Xu Si in his last-32 match against Ryan Day.

== Format ==
The event was the tenth iteration of the International Championship, first held in 2012. The event took place from 3 to 10 November 2024 in Nanjing, China. Nanjing will host the tournament for three consecutive years from 2024 to 2026.

Qualifying for the event was held from 30 September to 2 October 2024 at the Ponds Forge International Sports Centre in Sheffield, England.

Matches were the best of 11 frames until the semi‑finals, which were the best of 17 frames played over two sessions, and the final was a best of 19 frames match, also played over two sessions.

The qualifying was broadcast by Discovery+ in Europe (including the United Kingdom and Ireland) and by the CBSA-WPBSA Academy WeChat Channel, CBSA-WPBSA Academy Douyin and Huya Live in China. It was available from Matchroom Sport in all other territories.

The main event was broadcast domestically in China by CCTV-5, the CBSA-WPBSA Academy WeChat Channel, the CBSA-WPBSA Academy Douyin and Huya Live; by Eurosport and Discovery+ in Europe (including the United Kingdom and Ireland); by Now TV in Hong Kong; by Astro SuperSport in Malaysia and Brunei; by TAP in the Philippines; by Sportcast in Taiwan; and by True Sports in Thailand. It was available from Matchroom Sport in all other territories.

=== Prize fund ===
The breakdown of prize money for this event is shown below:

- Winner: £175,000
- Runner-up: £75,000
- Semi-final: £33,000
- Quarter-final: £22,000
- Last 16: £14,000
- Last 32: £9,000
- Last 64: £5,000
- Highest break: £5,000
- Total: £825,000

== Summary ==
=== Qualifying round ===
In his 6‍–‍4 win over Lei Peifan, Thai player Thepchaiya Un-Nooh missed the final black of a potential maximum break for the third time in his career.

=== Early rounds ===
==== Held over matches ====
The held-over qualifying matches were played on 3 November as the best of 11 frames. Ronnie O'Sullivan beat Mink Nutcharut 6‍–‍3 making two century breaks, Zhang Anda defeated Ishpreet Singh Chadha 6‍–‍5, Ding Junhui whitewashed Reanne Evans, Kyren Wilson also whitewashed Mitchell Mann, and Si Jiahui beat Andrew Pagett 6‍–‍4.

==== Last 64 ====
The last 64 matches were played on 3 and 4 November as the best of 11 frames. On 3 November John Higgins recovered from 0‍–‍3 down to beat Ben Woollaston 6‍–‍4, Mark Selby also came back from 2‍–‍4 down to beat Jamie Clarke 6‍–‍4, Xiao Guodong whitewashed Ricky Walden, Xu Si beat Stan Moody 6‍–‍5, Matthew Stevens defeated amateur player Simon Blackwell 6‍–‍5, and Pang Junxu beat Elliot Slessor also by 6‍–‍5. On 4 November Neil Robertson made four century breaks in his whitewash of Fan Zhengyi, Barry Hawkins beat Joe Perry 6‍–‍2, and O'Sullivan defeated He Guoqiang also by 6‍–‍2. Ding beat Martin O'Donnell 6‍–‍1, Kyren Wilson defeated Liu Hongyu 6‍–‍3, Judd Trump whitewashed Sanderson Lam, and Mark Allen beat Aaron Hill 6‍–‍1.

==== Last 32 ====
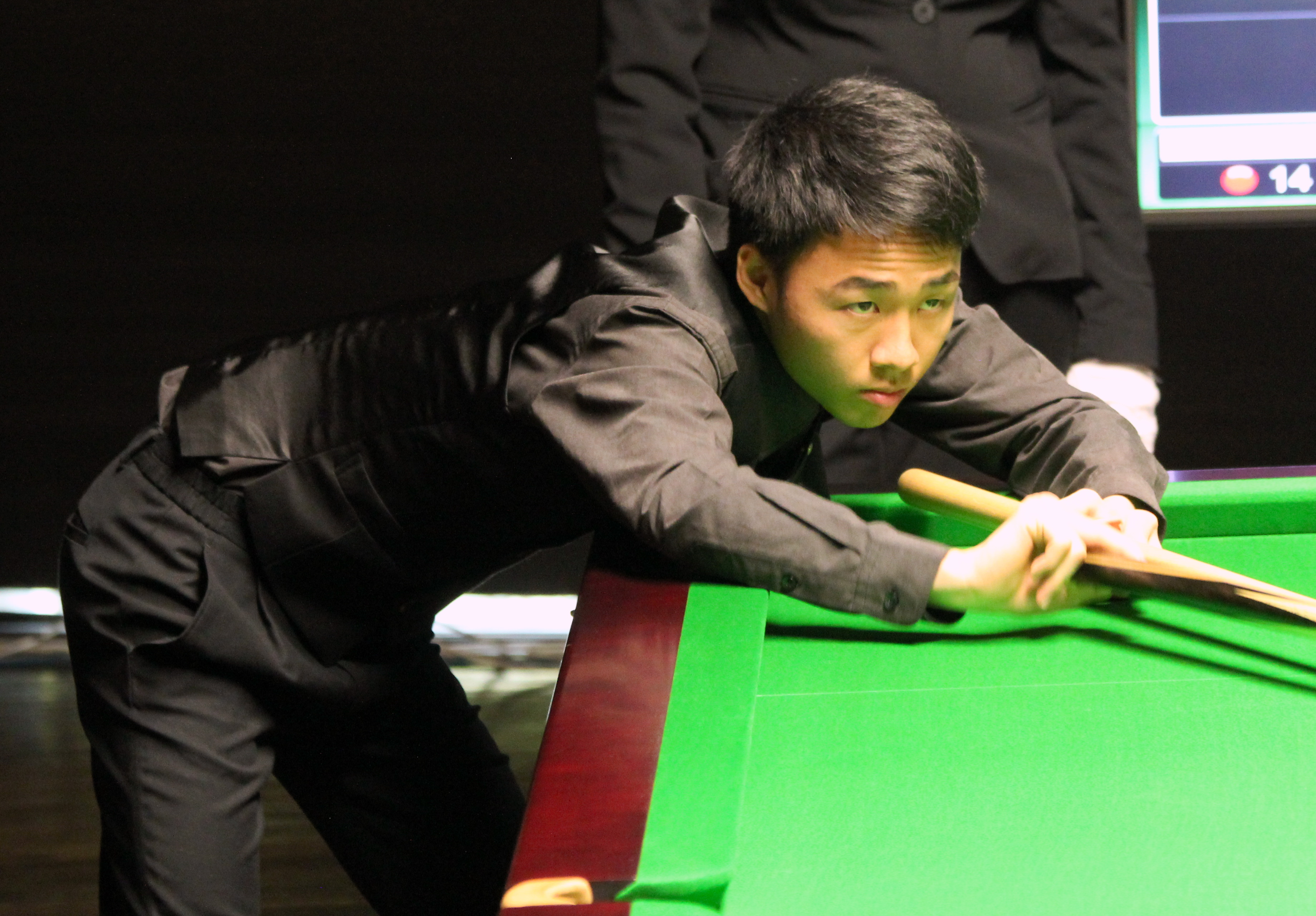
Xu Si (pictured in 2017) made the second maximum break of his career in his last 32-round match against Ryan Day

The last 32 matches were played on 5 November as the best of 11 frames. Xu made his second career maximum break in his 6‍–‍2 victory over Ryan Day. Pang defeated 5th seed O'Sullivan 6‍–‍4, and Trump beat Joe O'Connor, also by 6‍–‍4. Hawkins beat Neil Robertson 6‍–‍1, Kyren Wilson made three century breaks in his 6‍–‍4 victory over Wu Yize, and Xiao defeated 4th seed Allen 6‍–‍2. Chris Wakelin beat 9th seed Shaun Murphy 6‍–‍3, and Ding whitewashed Hossein Vafaei. Defending champion and top seed Zhang was beaten 1‍–‍6 by Lyu Haotian.

==== Last 16 ====
The last 16 matches were played on 6 November as the best of 11 frames. In the morning session Wakelin beat 8th seed Mark Williams, Xu beat 3rd seed Trump, and Jackson Page beat Pang, all by 6‍–‍4. In the match between Lyu and Higgins, frame 10 was decided on a re‑spotted black, which Higgins won to force a deciding frame. The match was then taken off, to be concluded later. When they resumed, Higgins won the decider. Kyren Wilson beat Hawkins 6‍–‍2, Xiao beat Jack Lisowski 6‍–‍3, Ding beat Jiang Jun, 6‍–‍3, and Gary Wilson beat 6th seed Selby also by 6‍–‍3.

=== Later rounds ===
==== Quarter finals ====
The quarter-finals were played on 7 November as the best of 11 frames. In the afternoon session Xiao beat Page 6‍–‍4, making two century breaks. In the match between Wakelin and Higgins, the match was taken off at 5‍–‍5 to be resumed later. In the evening session Ding beat Kyren Wilson 6‍–‍4 making century breaks in the last two frames. Wakelin took the deciding frame to defeat Higgins 6‍–‍5, and Xu beat Gary Wilson, also by 6‍–‍5. After being informed that his match would be interrupted before the deciding frame for the second time in two days, Higgins was visibly annoyed. His eventual defeat meant that he failed to qualify for the upcoming Champion of Champions event.

==== Semi finals ====
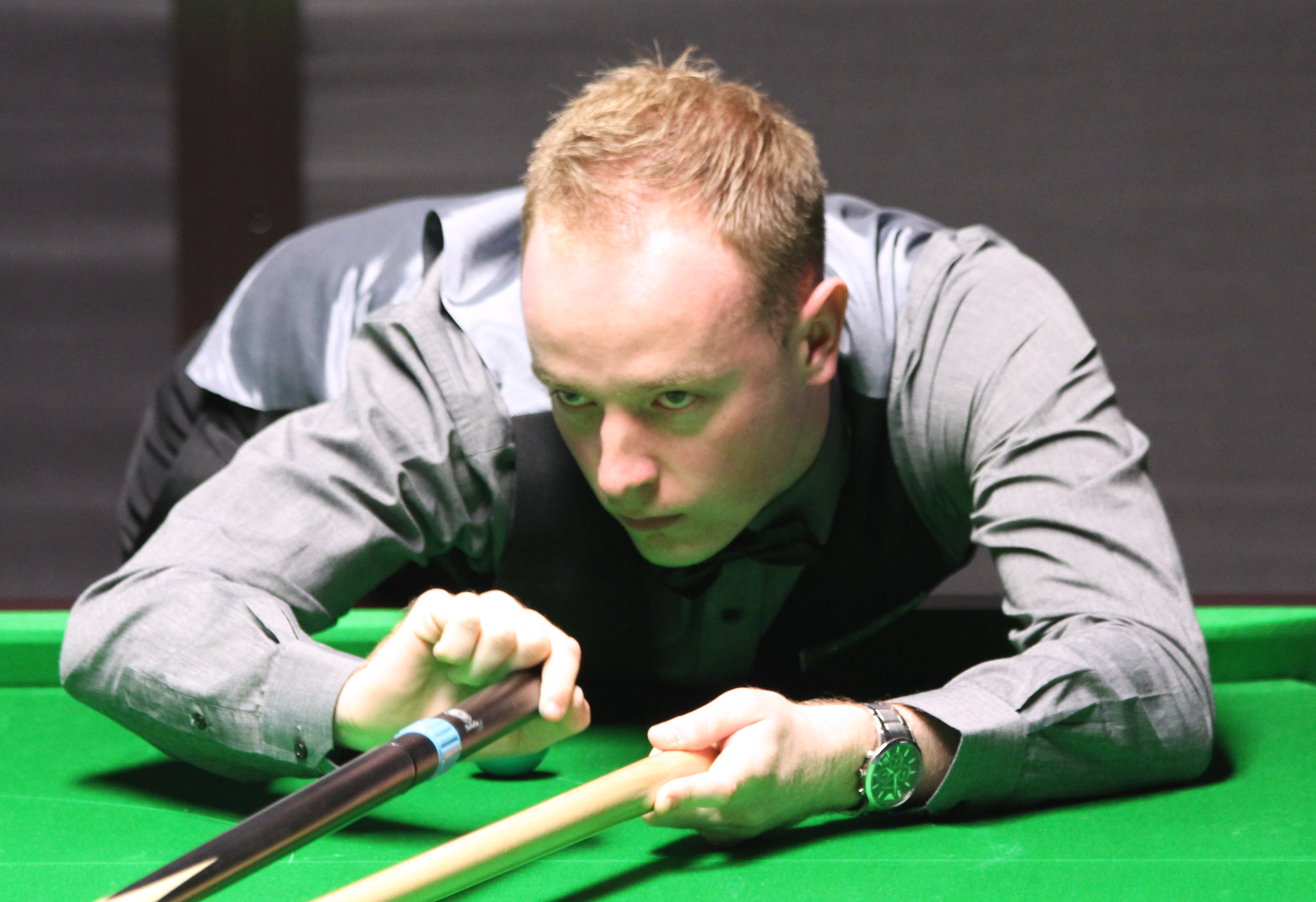
Chris Wakelin (pictured in 2016) beat Xiao Guodong 9‍–‍8 in the semi‑finals

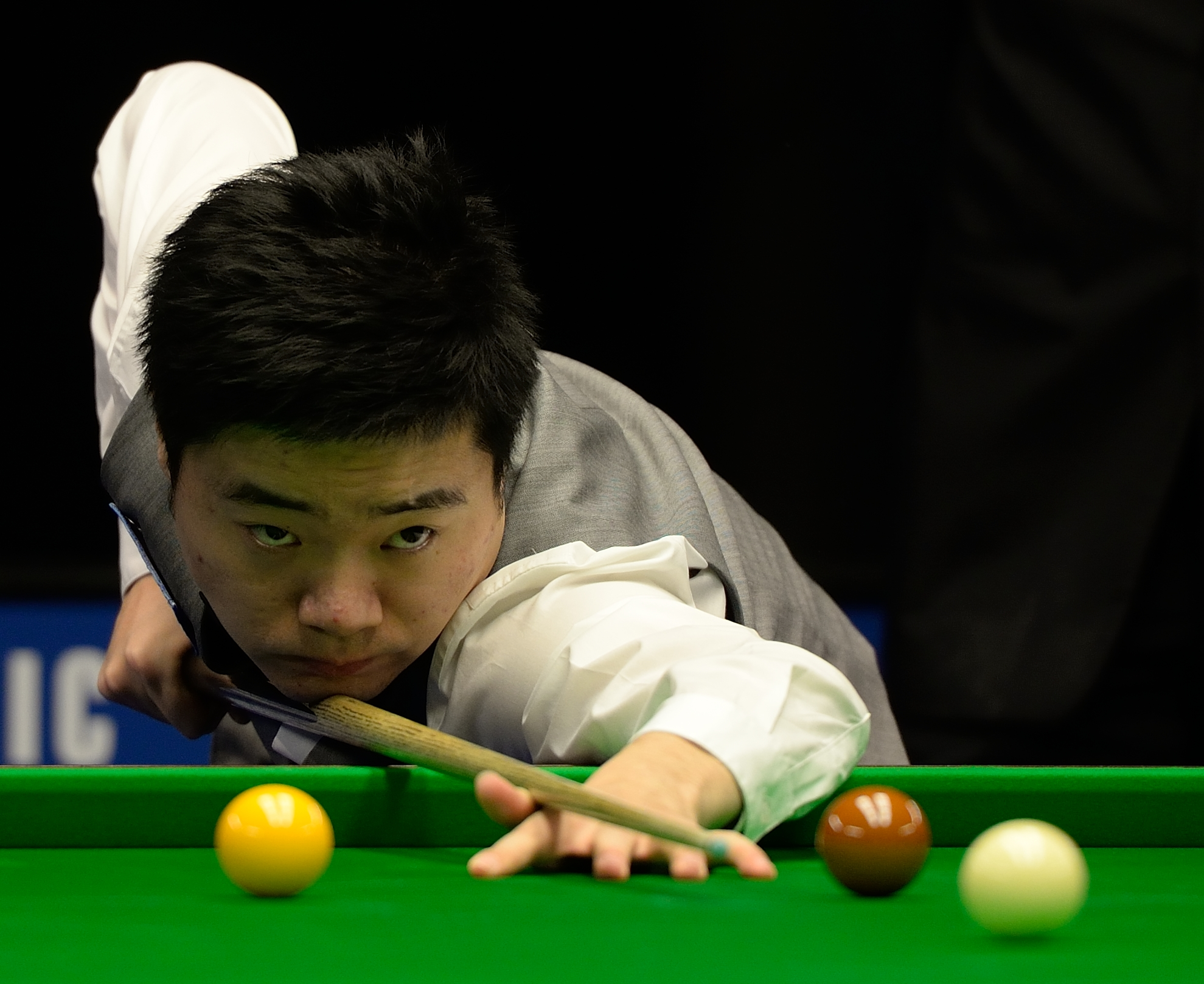
Ding Junhui (pictured in 2015) beat Xu Si 9‍–‍6 in the semi‑finals

The semi-finals were played on 8 and 9 November as the best of 17 frames, played over two sessions. For only the third time ever in a ranking event, three of the four semi‑finalists were Chinese (the other two times being the 2020 Shoot Out and the 2024 Wuhan Open the previous month).

On 8 November Wakelin played Xiao. At the end of the afternoon session Wakelin led Xiao by 5‍–‍3. Wakelin went on to win the match 9‍–‍8, making a 119 break in the 10th frame. After the match Wakelin said: "From 8‍–‍5 I threw it away. I made ridiculously easy mistakes. In the decider I knew it was now or never, I had to forget about what had happened. I'm so relieved to have a day off tomorrow because I'm done in! That was the hardest match of my life. In the first ten years of my career, so many times I put myself in winning situations in matches but didn't take those chances. This was my final because getting into the top 16 was the goal. But now the shackles are off and I know I have performances like that in me." Xiao said: "I fell too far behind at the start and didn't perform particularly well. My opponent had me under pressure throughout the match, I couldn't find my rhythm. I want to apologise to Ding and Xu for not making it to an all‑Chinese final! I hope they can keep the title here in China. This is the best time ever for Chinese snooker and I hope the young players can gain experience and keep improving."

On 9 November Xu played Ding. At the end of the afternoon session Xu led Ding by 5‍–‍3, with Xu making breaks of 137 and 113, and Ding making a 119 break. In the evening session Ding went on to win the match 9‍–‍6. After the match, Ding said: "In the first session, Xu played really well, I didn't have many opportunities in the first half, and he managed century breaks with great sharpness, making the most of his chances. However, he wasn't quite at the same level in the second session. He had many chances tonight but lost the first three frames, which impacted his mindset." Xu said: "I was feeling good in the first session, but my focus seemed to slip in the second, and I made more mistakes. I had plenty of opportunities but struggled throughout, unable to get the positioning I wanted, and my safety play was quite average. Overall, aside from the second session in this match, I'm pretty satisfied with my performance in the tournament."

==== Final ====
The final was played on 10 November as the best of 19 frames, played over two sessions. Wakelin, playing in his third ranking event final, faced Ding, who was playing in his 24th. At the end of the afternoon session, Ding recovered from 1‍–‍4 down to lead Wakelin 5‍–‍4. Ding went on to win the match 10‍–‍7, and secure his first ranking title since the 2019 UK Championship. After the match Ding said: "I've played so well in every match. Chris applied a lot of pressure in this game, especially at 4‍–‍1. I put too much pressure on myself at the beginning. That was the perfect start for him, but he started missing and there were some key frames to get 5‍–‍4 ahead. The second session was totally different." Wakelin said: "I got off to a great start and losing six frames on the trot was the difference. I was proud of how well I handled myself. Only a couple of years ago, that kind of situation would have scared the life out of me. To be out there and feel like I could have won, despite how Ding played, I think I was a credit to myself."

== Main draw ==
The draw for the tournament is shown below. Numbers in parentheses after the players' names denote the top 32 seeded players, and players in bold denote match winners.

=== Top half ===
**Last 64**; Best of 11 frames
**Zhang Anda (CHN) (1)**	**6**
David Grace (ENG)	3
Haydon Pinhey (ENG)	4
**Lyu Haotian (CHN)**	**6**
Simon Blackwell (ENG) (a)	5
**Matthew Stevens (WAL)**	**6**
**John Higgins (SCO) (17)**	**6**
Ben Woollaston (ENG)	4
Zak Surety (ENG) (Note: Zak Surety withdrew and so Chris Wakelin was given a walkover to the last 32.)	w/d
**Chris Wakelin (ENG) (24)**	**w/o**
Anthony Hamilton (ENG) (Note: Anthony Hamilton withdrew and so Shaun Murphy was given a walkover to the last 32.)	w/d
**Shaun Murphy (ENG) (9)**	**w/o**
**Thepchaiya Un-Nooh (THA)**	**6**
Stuart Bingham (ENG) (25)	0
Mark Davis (ENG) (Note: Mark Davis withdrew and so Mark Williams was given a walkover to the last 32.)	w/d
**Mark Williams (WAL) (8)**	**w/o**
**Ronnie O'Sullivan (ENG) (5)**	**6**
He Guoqiang (CHN)	2
**Pang Junxu (CHN) (28)**	**6**
Elliot Slessor (ENG)	5
**Ali Carter (ENG) (12)**	**6**
Ross Muir (SCO)	5
David Gilbert (ENG) (21)	4
**Jackson Page (WAL)**	**6**
Gong Chenzhi (CHN)	5
**Jack Lisowski (ENG) (20)**	**6**
Ben Mertens (BEL)	3
**Si Jiahui (CHN) (13)**	**6**
Ricky Walden (ENG)	0
**Xiao Guodong (CHN) (29)**	**6**
Aaron Hill (IRL)	2
**Mark Allen (NIR) (4)**	**6**

**Last 32**; Best of 11 frames
(China) Zhang Anda (1)	1
**(China) Lyu Haotian**	**6**
(Wales) Matthew Stevens	1
**(Scotland) John Higgins (17)**	**6**
**(England) Chris Wakelin (24)**	**6**
(England) Shaun Murphy (9)	3
(Thailand) Thepchaiya Un-Nooh	1
**(Wales) Mark Williams (8)**	**6**
(England) Ronnie O'Sullivan (5)	4
**(China) Pang Junxu (28)**	**6**
(England) Ali Carter (12)	4
**(Wales) Jackson Page**	**6**
**(England) Jack Lisowski (20)**	**6**
(China) Si Jiahui (13)	5
**(China) Xiao Guodong (29)**	**6**
(Northern Ireland) Mark Allen (4)	2

**Last 16**; Best of 11 frames
(China) Lyu Haotian	5
**(Scotland) John Higgins (17)**	**6**
**(England) Chris Wakelin (24)**	**6**
(Wales) Mark Williams (8)	4
(China) Pang Junxu (28)	4
**(Wales) Jackson Page**	**6**
(England) Jack Lisowski (20)	3
**(China) Xiao Guodong (29)**	**6**

**Quarter-finals**; Best of 11 frames
(Scotland) John Higgins (17)	5
**(England) Chris Wakelin (24)**	**6**
(Wales) Jackson Page	4
**(China) Xiao Guodong (29)**	**6**

**Semi-finals**; Best of 17 frames
**(England) Chris Wakelin (24)**	**9**
(China) Xiao Guodong (29)	8

Note: w/d=withdrawn; w/o=walkover

=== Bottom half ===
**Last 64**; Best of 11 frames
**Judd Trump (ENG) (3)**	**6**
Sanderson Lam (ENG)	0
**Joe O'Connor (ENG) (30)**	**6**
Anthony McGill (SCO)	1
Stan Moody (ENG)	5
**Xu Si (CHN)**	**6**
**Ryan Day (WAL) (19)**	**6**
Daniel Womersley (ENG) (a) (Note: Daniel Womersley replaced Jamie Jones who withdrew.)	3
**Robbie Williams (ENG)**	**6**
Stuart Carrington (ENG)	3
Dean Young (SCO)	4
**Gary Wilson (ENG) (11)**	**6**
Jimmy Robertson (ENG)	1
**Noppon Saengkham (THA) (27)**	**6**
Jamie Clarke (WAL)	4
**Mark Selby (ENG) (6)**	**6**
**Jiang Jun (CHN)**	**6**
Amir Sarkhosh (IRN)	5
Michael Holt (ENG)	4
**Yuan Sijun (CHN)**	**6**
**Ding Junhui (CHN) (10)**	**6**
Martin O'Donnell (ENG)	1
**Hossein Vafaei (IRN) (23)**	**6**
Dylan Emery (WAL) (a)	1
Joe Perry (ENG)	2
**Barry Hawkins (ENG) (18)**	**6**
Fan Zhengyi (CHN)	0
**Neil Robertson (AUS) (15)**	**6**
Andrew Higginson (ENG)	3
**Wu Yize (CHN) (31)**	**6**
Liu Hongyu (CHN)	3
**Kyren Wilson (ENG) (2)**	**6**

**Last 32**; Best of 11 frames
**(England) Judd Trump (3)**	**6**
(England) Joe O'Connor (30)	4
**(China) Xu Si**	**6**
(Wales) Ryan Day (19)	2
(England) Robbie Williams	5
**(England) Gary Wilson (11)**	**6**
(Thailand) Noppon Saengkham (27)	3
**(England) Mark Selby (6)**	**6**
**(China) Jiang Jun**	**6**
(China) Yuan Sijun	4
**(China) Ding Junhui (10)**	**6**
(Iran) Hossein Vafaei (23)	0
**(England) Barry Hawkins (18)**	**6**
(Australia) Neil Robertson (15)	1
(China) Wu Yize (31)	4
**(England) Kyren Wilson (2)**	**6**

**Last 16**; Best of 11 frames
(England) Judd Trump (3)	4
**(China) Xu Si**	**6**
**(England) Gary Wilson (11)**	**6**
(England) Mark Selby (6)	3
(China) Jiang Jun	3
**(China) Ding Junhui (10)**	**6**
(England) Barry Hawkins (18)	2
**(England) Kyren Wilson (2)**	**6**

**Quarter-finals**; Best of 11 frames
**(China) Xu Si**	**6**
(England) Gary Wilson (11)	5
**(China) Ding Junhui (10)**	**6**
(England) Kyren Wilson (2)	4

**Semi-finals**; Best of 17 frames
(China) Xu Si	6
**(China) Ding Junhui (10)**	**9**

=== Final ===
Final: Best of 19 frames. Referee: Xie Yixin; SNCNFC, Nanjing, China, 10 November 2024
Chris Wakelin (24); England	7–**10**	**Ding Junhui** (10); China
Afternoon: **78**–41, 54–**64**, **92**–9, **85**–0, **65**–9, 0–**76**, 0–**80**, 53–**54**, 42–**81**; Evening: 17–**66**, 30–**92**, **82**–0, **93**–3, 6–**106**, **79**–34, 5–**72**, 31–**81**
(frame 3) 92	Highest break	**98** (frame 14)
0	Century breaks	0

== Qualifying ==
Qualification for the tournament took place from 30 September to 2 October 2024 at the Ponds Forge International Sports Centre in Sheffield, England. Numbers in parentheses after the players' names denote the top 32 seeded players, and players in bold denote match winners.

=== Nanjing ===
Qualifying matches featuring the defending champion (Zhang Anda); the reigning World Champion (Kyren Wilson); the two highest ranked Chinese players other than Zhang (Ding Junhui and Si Jiahui); four Chinese wildcards (Zhou Jinhao, Wang Xinbo, Cai Wei, and Zheng Dian); and Ronnie O'Sullivan were held over to be played in Nanjing. The results of the held‑over matches played on 3 November 2024 were as follows:

==== Morning session ====
- **Zhang Anda** (CHN) (1) **6**–5 Ishpreet Singh Chadha (IND)
- **David Grace** (ENG) **6**–2 Zhou Jinhao (CHN)
- **Si Jiahui** (CHN) (13) **6**–4 Andrew Pagett (WAL)
- **Hossein Vafaei** (IRN) (23) **6**–4 Zheng Dian (CHN)

==== Afternoon session ====
- **Ronnie O'Sullivan** (ENG) (5) **6**–3 Mink Nutcharut (THA)
- **Ali Carter** (ENG) (12) **6**–1 Cai Wei (CHN)
- **Noppon Saengkham** (THA) (27) **6**–3 Wang Xinbo (CHN)
- **Kyren Wilson** (ENG) (2) **6**–0 Mitchell Mann (ENG)

==== Evening session ====
- **Ding Junhui** (CHN) (10) **6**–0 Reanne Evans (ENG)

=== Sheffield ===
The results of the qualifying matches played in Sheffield were as follows:

==== 30 September ====
- **Chris Wakelin** (ENG) (24) **6**–2 Cheung Ka Wai (HKG)
- **Anthony McGill** (SCO) **6**–1 Ashley Carty (ENG)
- **Xiao Guodong** (CHN) (29) **6**–3 Kreishh Gurbaxani (IND)
- **Anthony Hamilton** (ENG) **6**–0 Jimmy White (ENG)
- **Pang Junxu** (CHN) **6**–1 Iulian Boiko (UKR) (a)
- **Wu Yize** (CHN) (31) **6**–4 Wang Yuchen (HKG)
- **Mark Williams** (WAL) (8) **6**–0 Haris Tahir (PAK)
- **Judd Trump** (ENG) (3) **6**–1 Chris Totten (SCO)
- Tian Pengfei (CHN) 5–**6** **Dean Young** (SCO)
- **Fan Zhengyi** (CHN) **6**–3 Long Zehuang (CHN)
- **Thepchaiya Un-Nooh** (THA) **6**–4 Lei Peifan (CHN)
- Liam Davies (WAL) 2–**6** **Daniel Womersley** (ENG) (a)
- Scott Donaldson (SCO) 3–**6** **Dylan Emery** (WAL) (a)
- Graeme Dott (SCO) 4–**6** **Ben Mertens** (BEL)
- **Martin O'Donnell** (ENG) **6**–2 Julien Leclercq (BEL)
- **Stuart Bingham** (ENG) (25) **6**–0 Liam Graham (SCO)
- Stephen Maguire (SCO) (32) 2–**6** **Haydon Pinhey** (ENG)
- **John Higgins** (SCO) (17) **6**–1 Ken Doherty (IRL)
- **Xu Si** (CHN) **6**–5 Ahmed Aly Elsayed (USA)
- **Jamie Clarke** (WAL) **6**–3 Mostafa Dorgham (EGY)

==== 1 October ====
- Zhou Yuelong (CHN) (26) 5–**6** **Michael Holt** (ENG)
- **Jimmy Robertson** (ENG) **6**–5 Sunny Akani (THA)
- **Mark Selby** (ENG) (6) **6**–3 Artemijs Žižins (LVA)
- **Gary Wilson** (ENG) (11) **6**–3 Hammad Miah (ENG)
- **Lyu Haotian** (CHN) **6**–5 Marco Fu (HKG)
- Jak Jones (WAL) (16) 5–**6** **Simon Blackwell** (ENG) (a)
- **Mark Davis** (ENG) **6**–1 Baipat Siripaporn (THA)
- Jordan Brown (NIR) 4–**6** **Gong Chenzhi** (CHN)
- **Sanderson Lam** (ENG) **6**–5 Alexander Ursenbacher (SUI)
- **Elliot Slessor** (ENG) **6**–3 Manasawin Phetmalaikul (THA)
- **Shaun Murphy** (ENG) (9) **6**–4 Louis Heathcote (ENG)
- Luca Brecel (BEL) (7) 3–**6** **Jiang Jun** (CHN)
- Tom Ford (ENG) (14) 2–**6** **Stan Moody** (ENG)
- **Robbie Williams** (ENG) (19) **6**–3 Allan Taylor (ENG)
- **Barry Hawkins** (ENG) (18) **6**–1 Joshua Thomond (ENG) (a)
- Robert Milkins (ENG) (22) 4–**6** **Stuart Carrington** (ENG)
- **Ben Woollaston** (ENG) **6**–4 Duane Jones (WAL)
- **Aaron Hill** (IRL) **6**–2 Liam Pullen (ENG)
- **Neil Robertson** (AUS) (15) **6**–1 Alfie Burden (ENG)
- David Lilley (ENG) 3–**6** **Amir Sarkhosh** (IRN)
- Dominic Dale (WAL) 4–**6** **Zak Surety** (ENG)
- **Joe O'Connor** (ENG) (30) **6**–1 Robbie McGuigan (NIR)

==== 2 October ====
- **Yuan Sijun** (CHN) **6**–1 Ian Burns (ENG)
- **Matthew Stevens** (WAL) **6**–0 Huang Jiahao (CHN)
- **Ricky Walden** (ENG) **6**–4 Xing Zihao (CHN)
- **He Guoqiang** (CHN) **6**–1 Antoni Kowalski (POL)
- **Ryan Day** (WAL) (19) **6**–5 Ma Hailong (CHN)
- **Liu Hongyu** (CHN) **6**–5 Rory Thor (MAS)
- **David Gilbert** (ENG) (21) **6**–2 Bai Yulu (CHN)
- **Jack Lisowski** (ENG) (20) **6**–5 Bulcsú Révész (HUN)
- Daniel Wells (WAL) 2–**6** **Ross Muir** (SCO)
- **Jackson Page** (WAL) **6**–2 Oliver Lines (ENG)
- **Joe Perry** (ENG) **6**–1 Jonas Luz (BRA)
- **Mark Allen** (NIR) (4) **6**–3 Farakh Ajaib (PAK)
- Matthew Selt (ENG) 5–**6** **Andrew Higginson** (ENG)

== Century breaks ==
=== Main stage centuries ===
A total of 93 century breaks were made during the main stage of the tournament in Nanjing.

- 147, 137, 113, 112, 104, 101 – Xu Si
- 143, 127, 121, 117, 109, 105, 101 – Kyren Wilson
- 142, 118 – Ben Mertens
- 140, 103 – Matthew Stevens
- 138 – Thepchaiya Un-Nooh
- 136, 127, 113 – Joe O'Connor
- 136, 125, 123, 106, 105 – Gary Wilson
- 135, 135, 109, 102 – Neil Robertson
- 135, 130, 122, 110 – Xiao Guodong
- 134, 130, 118, 107, 103 – Jiang Jun
- 133, 117, 112 – John Higgins
- 132, 124 – Ronnie O'Sullivan
- 131, 106 – Zhang Anda
- 131 – Aaron Hill
- 129, 124, 123, 119, 109, 107 – Ding Junhui
- 128, 116, 107 – Barry Hawkins
- 125 – Michael Holt
- 123, 120 – Pang Junxu
- 121 – Gong Chenzhi
- 121 – Mark Williams
- 120, 119 – Si Jiahui
- 120, 111, 109, 104 – Yuan Sijun
- 119, 116, 112, 102 – Chris Wakelin
- 119, 107 – Noppon Saengkham
- 118, 110, 104 – Jack Lisowski
- 117, 101 – Jackson Page
- 116, 104 – Hossein Vafaei
- 114, 112 – Mark Selby
- 112, 101, 100 – Wu Yize
- 111, 100 – Jamie Clarke
- 108 – Haydon Pinhey
- 107 – Stuart Carrington
- 107 – David Grace
- 107 – Judd Trump
- 103 – Mark Allen
- 101 – Ali Carter

=== Qualifying stage centuries ===
A total of 42 century breaks were made during the qualifying stage of the tournament in Sheffield.

- 143, 103 – Mark Selby
- 140, 102 – Thepchaiya Un-Nooh
- 140 – Elliot Slessor
- 139 – Fan Zhengyi
- 137 – Ashley Carty
- 135 – Marco Fu
- 134, 133 – Rory Thor
- 131 – Xiao Guodong
- 130, 113 – Louis Heathcote
- 127, 123 – Mark Allen
- 126, 120 – Gary Wilson
- 125 – Shaun Murphy
- 121 – Anthony McGill
- 119 – Stuart Bingham
- 119 – John Higgins
- 116 – Michael Holt
- 113, 104 – Jiang Jun
- 112, 102 – Jimmy Robertson
- 110 – Yuan Sijun
- 109 – Alfie Burden
- 108 – Jack Lisowski
- 107 – Robbie Williams
- 106 – Gong Chenzhi
- 104, 100 – David Gilbert
- 104 – Lei Peifan
- 104 – Daniel Wells
- 104 – Ben Woollaston
- 103, 101 – Zhou Yuelong
- 103 – Judd Trump
- 100 – Dylan Emery
- 100 – Neil Robertson
- 100 – Mark Williams
