= International Championship =

International snooker tournament

Tournament information
- Location: Nanjing
- Country: China
- Established: 2012
- Organisation(s): World Snooker Tour; CBSA
- Format: Ranking event
- Total prize fund: £825,000
- Winner's share: £175,000
- Recent edition: 2026
- Current champion: Kyren Wilson (ENG)

The International Championship is a professional ranking snooker tournament held in Nanjing, China. The reigning champion is Kyren Wilson.

== History ==
The event was introduced in the 2012–2013 season. It was dubbed as the "first overseas major", due to the same level of ranking points as the UK Championship at the time. The tournament once offered the highest prize fund outside of the United Kingdom until 2018, when China Open had its winner's cheque raised to £225,000. The 2012 edition ran from 28 October to 4 November in Chengdu, China, and it was won by Judd Trump, who defeated Neil Robertson 10–8 in the final.

== Winners ==
Year	Winner	Runner-up	Final score	Venue	City	Season
2012	Judd Trump (ENG)	Neil Robertson (AUS)	10–8	Sichuan International Tennis Center	Chengdu, China	2012/13
2013	Ding Junhui (CHN)	Marco Fu (HKG)	10–9	Chengdu Eastern Music Park	Chengdu, China	2013/14
2014	Ricky Walden (ENG)	Mark Allen (NIR)	10–7	Sichuan International Tennis Center	Chengdu, China	2014/15
2015	John Higgins (SCO)	David Gilbert (ENG)	10–5	Baihu Media Broadcasting Centre	Daqing, China	2015/16
2016	Mark Selby (ENG)	Ding Junhui (CHN)	10–1	Baihu Media Broadcasting Centre	Daqing, China	2016/17
2017	Mark Selby (ENG)	Mark Allen (NIR)	10–7	Baihu Media Broadcasting Centre	Daqing, China	2017/18
2018	Mark Allen (NIR)	Neil Robertson (AUS)	10–5	Baihu Media Broadcasting Centre	Daqing, China	2018/19
2019	Judd Trump (ENG)	Shaun Murphy (ENG)	10–3	Baihu Media Broadcasting Centre	Daqing, China	2019/20
2020–2022	Cancelled due to the COVID-19 pandemic					
2023	Zhang Anda (CHN)	Tom Ford (ENG)	10–6	Tianjin People's Stadium	Tianjin, China	2023/24
2024	Ding Junhui (CHN)	Chris Wakelin (ENG)	10–7	SNCNFC	Nanjing, China	2024/25
2025	Wu Yize (CHN)	John Higgins (SCO)	10–6	SNCNFC	Nanjing, China	2025/26
2026	Kyren Wilson (ENG)	John Higgins (SCO)	10–8	SNCNFC	Nanjing, China	2026/27

== Finalists ==
Name	Nationality	Winner	Runner-up	Finals
Ding Junhui	China	2	1	3
Mark Selby	England	2	0	2
Judd Trump	England	2	0	2
Mark Allen	Northern Ireland	1	2	3
John Higgins	Scotland	1	2	3
Ricky Walden	England	1	0	1
Zhang Anda	China	1	0	1
Wu Yize	China	1	0	1
Kyren Wilson	England	1	0	1
Neil Robertson	Australia	0	2	2
Marco Fu	Hong Kong	0	1	1
David Gilbert	England	0	1	1
Shaun Murphy	England	0	1	1
Tom Ford	England	0	1	1
Chris Wakelin	England	0	1	1

Legend
The names of active players are marked in **bold**.
