= 2023 International Championship =

Snooker tournament, held in China

2023 Du Xiaoman International Championship

Tournament information
- Dates: 5–12 November 2023
- Venue: Tianjin People's Stadium
- City: Tianjin
- Country: China
- Organisation: World Snooker Tour
- Format: Ranking event
- Total prize fund: £825,000
- Winner's share: £175,000
- Highest break: Ryan Day (WAL) (147); Zhang Anda (CHN) (147)

Final
- Champion: Zhang Anda (CHN)
- Runner-up: Tom Ford (ENG)
- Score: 10–6

The 2023 International Championship (officially the 2023 Du Xiaoman International Championship) was a professional snooker tournament that took place from 5 to 12 November 2023 at the Tianjin People's Stadium in Tianjin, China. It was the ninth iteration of the International Championship first held in 2012, a return of the event to the tour after a three-year hiatus due to the COVID-19 pandemic. It was the first time the event had been held in Tianjin, introducing it as a new host city for World Snooker Tour tournaments.

Judd Trump was the defending champion, after defeating Shaun Murphy 10–3 in the previous final, but he lost 3–6 to Stephen Maguire in the last 32.

Chinese player Zhang Anda won his first ranking title, by defeating England's Tom Ford 10–6 in the final, and made a maximum break in the third frame. Ryan Day made the highest break in qualifying with a maximum break, the fourth in his career, in his 6–1 win against Mink Nutcharut.

By winning the event, Zhang advanced to within the top 16 for the first time in his career, received £175,000 from a total prize fund of £825,000, and secured a place in the 2023 Champion of Champions invitational event which started on the day following the end of this event.

== Format ==
The event was the ninth iteration of the International Championship, first held in 2012. The event took place from 5 to 12 November 2023 in Tianjin, China.

Qualifying for the event was held from 18 to 23 September 2023 at the Ponds Forge International Sports Centre in Sheffield, England. Matches were best of 11 frames until the semi-finals, which were best of 17 frames, and the final was a best-of-19-frames match.

The event was broadcast domestically in China by CCTV-5, Migu, Youku, and Huya Live; in Thailand on True Sports; in Hong Kong on Now TV; and in Europe (including the UK) by Eurosport and Discovery+. It was available from Matchroom Sport in all other territories.

=== Prize fund ===
The breakdown of prize money for this event is shown below:

- Winner: £175,000
- Runner-up: £75,000
- Semi-final: £33,000
- Quarter-final: £22,000
- Last 16: £14,000
- Last 32: £9,000
- Last 64: £5,000
- Highest break: £5,000
- Total: £825,000

== Summary ==
=== Qualifying round ===
Ryan Day made his fourth professional maximum break in his qualifying match against Mink Nutcharut, which Day won 6–1.

The 12th seed, Robert Milkins was beaten 4–6 by Marco Fu, and the 24th seed, Joe Perry was beaten 3–6 by Dylan Emery.

Mark Williams made his 600th career century break in his whitewash win over Rebecca Kenna.

=== Early rounds ===
==== Held-over matches ====
The held-over qualifying matches were played on 5 November. Top seed Trump extended his winning streak to 21 matches with a 6–0 whitewash defeat of 12-year-old Chinese wildcard Wang Xinzhong, who previously prevailed over another wildcard Gong Chenzhi by 6–5 on the same day. Second seed Luca Brecel had a 6–2 win over Daniel Womersley. Third seed Ronnie O'Sullivan scored a 6–1 win over Ken Doherty.

==== Last 64 ====
The last-64 matches were played on 5 and 6 November. Fourth seed Mark Allen came from 1–3 down to beat Oliver Lines 6–3. Brecel was defeated 3–6 by Mark Davis, and tenth seed Mark Williams was beaten by Zhang Anda by the same scoreline. O'Sullivan defeated Mark Joyce 6–3, Daniel Wells beat sixth seed Neil Robertson 6–1, and Dominic Dale beat seventh seed Murphy 6–3.

==== Last 32 ====
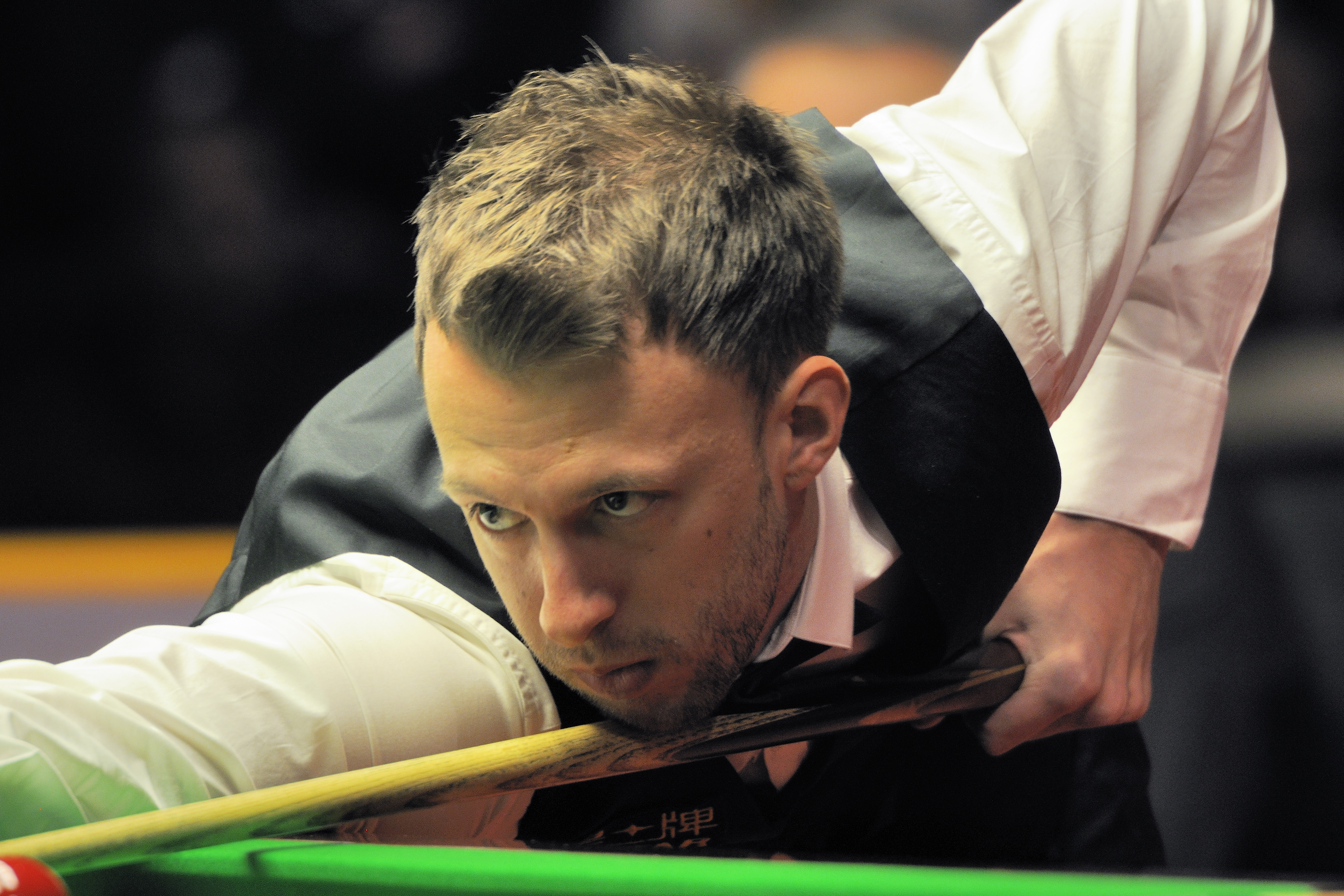
The defending champion Judd Trump (pictured) was beaten 6–3 by Stephen Maguire in the last-32.

The last-32 matches were played on 7 November. Thepchaiya Un-Nooh defeated fourth seed Allen 6–3, and Jordan Brown beat eighth seed Kyren Wilson 6–4.

The defending champion and top seed Trump was beaten by Maguire 6–3, ending his winning streak of 22 consecutive ranking matches.

==== Last 16 ====
The last-16 matches were played on 8 November. Jordan Brown defeated ninth seed John Higgins 6–3, and Tom Ford beat fifth seed Mark Selby by the same scoreline. Both O'Sullivan and Ding Junhui won their last-16 matches by 6–2, beating Anthony McGill and Pang Junxu respectively.

=== Later rounds ===
==== Quarter-finals ====
The quarter-finals were played on 9 November. In the afternoon session Ford defeated Barry Hawkins 6–4, and Brown beat Maguire 6–5. Maguire's century (115) in the tenth frame was his 500th as a professional. In the evening session O'Sullivan defeated Ali Carter 6–4, and Zhang beat Ding 6–3.

==== Semi-finals ====
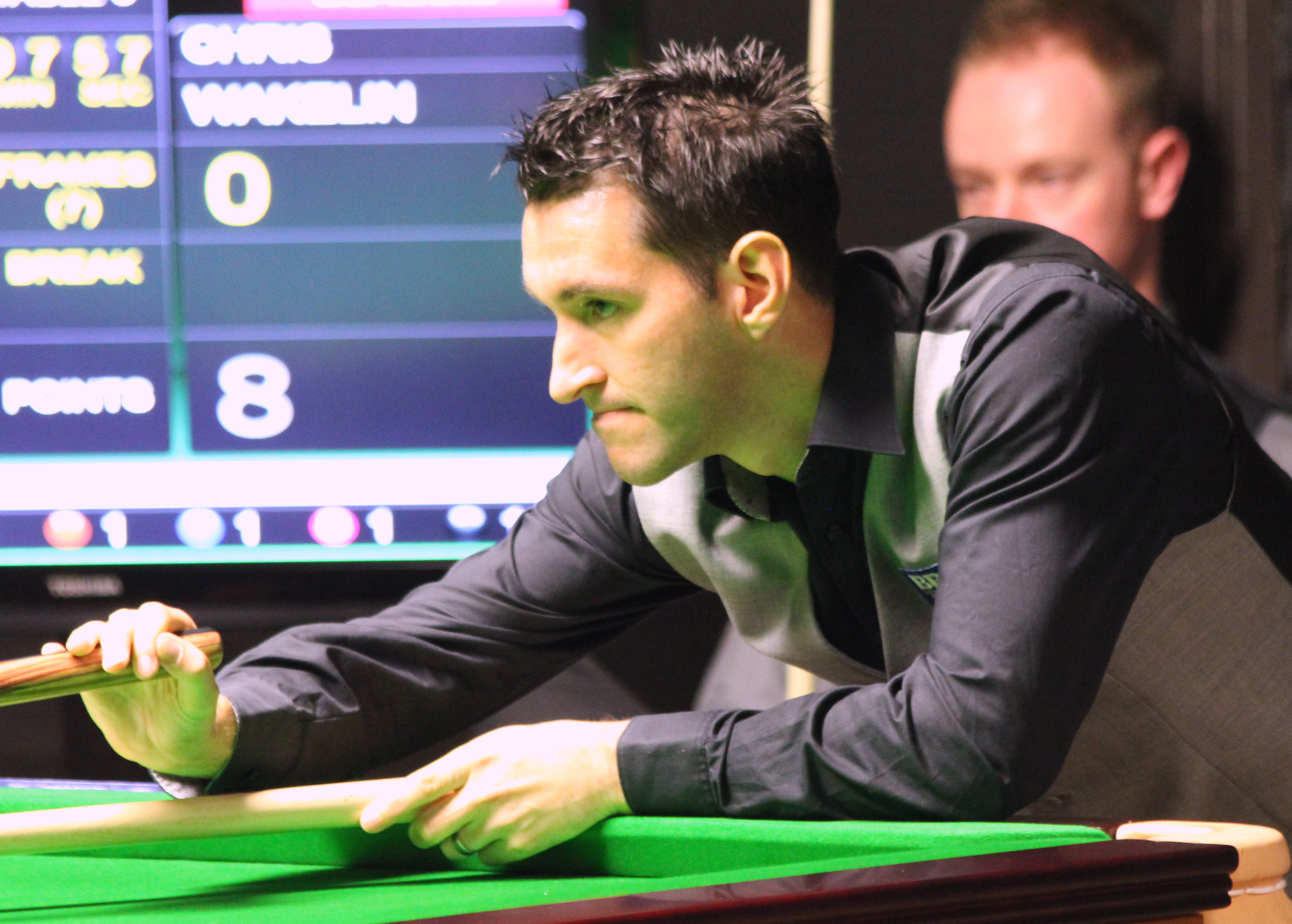
Tom Ford (pictured) defeated Jordan Brown 9–6 in the first semi-final to reach his third career ranking final, but lost to Zhang Anda.

The semi-finals were played as the best of 17 frames over two sessions on 10 and 11 November.

Ford played Brown on 10 November, and the afternoon session ended at 4–4 with both players making a century. In the evening session, Brown made a century of 134 in the ninth frame and went on to establish a 6–5 lead. Ford then made three centuries in a row to lead by 8–6, and won the match 9–6 with a break of 57 in the last frame. Ford said: "I don't feel as though I'm going to fall apart this week. It doesn't matter who I play, I feel like I can get in the balls and play as well as anybody." Brown said: "I was disappointed with the way I played to be honest. I don't want to take anything away from Tom. I thought he finished off the match very well. I think I just ran out of gas in the end."

O'Sullivan played Zhang on 11 November, with the afternoon session ending all square at 4–4. In the evening session, Zhang won the match 9–6, taking all of the last five frames with a century (114) in the 13th frame. Zhang said: "I personally like to play the long matches, because my performance in these matches is quite good. It makes it easier for me to feel involved, and it will slowly get me into the rhythm of the game." O'Sullivan said: "He played well and deserved to win. He was the better player on the day, so fair play to him. I expected him to be like that as I've played him a few times, he was solid. He is a fantastic player, I don't know where he has been for the last ten years."

==== Final ====
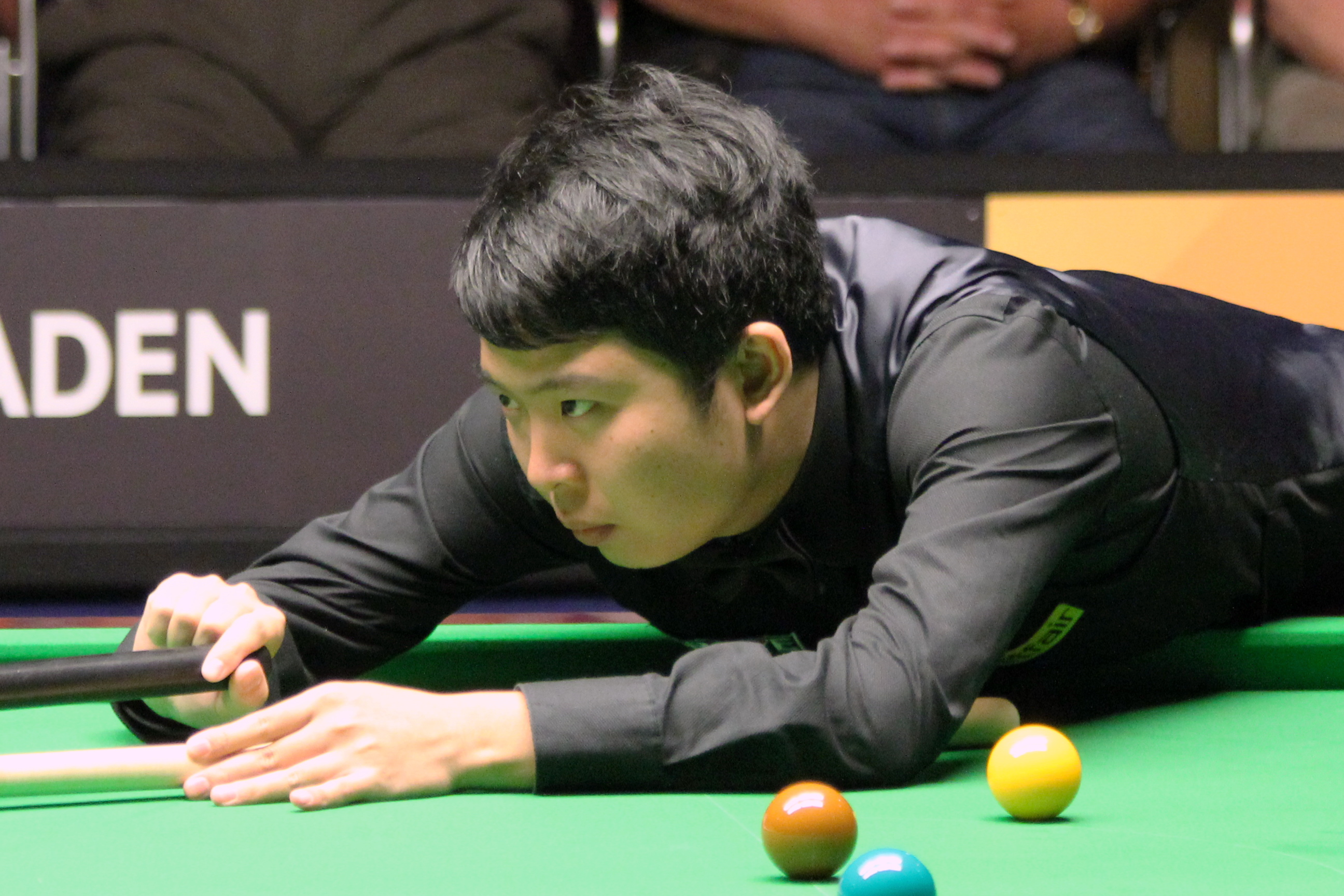
Zhang Anda (pictured) won his first ranking title by defeating Tom Ford 10–6 in the final.

The final was played as the best of 19 frames over two sessions between Ford and Zhang on 12 November. It is the first ranking event final since the 2022 Scottish Open to feature two players who have not won a ranking title before.

In the afternoon session Zhang made a 147 break in the third frame, his second as a professional. The session ended with Zhang leading Ford 5–4, with Zhang making a 101 break in the ninth frame. In the evening session, Ford made a 91 break to even the score at 5–5. Zhang won four consecutive frames to lead by 9–5, making a 108 break in the 13th frame, and won the final 10–6. Zhang said: "I'm feeling extremely excited. During the pandemic, I had considered retiring and giving up. But later on, I couldn't bear it and chose to return to the arena. I have been doing quite well in the past two or three years." Ford said: "I am gutted I got beat. Zhang was the better player so hats off to him. He deserved to win. It has been an amazing week. A nice arena and a big crowd. It is always good to come to China."

== Main draw ==
The draw for the tournament is shown below. Numbers in parentheses after the players' names denote the top 32 seeded players, whilst players in bold denote match winners.

=== Top half ===
**Last 64**; Best of 11 frames
**Judd Trump (ENG) (1)**	**6**
Michael White (WAL)	0
**Stephen Maguire (SCO) (32)**	**6**
Joe O'Connor (ENG)	4
**Ryan Day (WAL) (16)**	**6**
Jackson Page (WAL)	5
Hossein Vafaei (IRN) (17)	5
**Ross Muir (SCO)**	**6**
Wang Xinbo (CHN)	4
**Dylan Emery (WAL)**	**6**
David Grace (ENG)	1
**John Higgins (SCO) (9)**	**6**
**Jordan Brown (NIR)**	**6**
David Gilbert (ENG) (25)	3
Elliot Slessor (ENG)	2
**Kyren Wilson (ENG) (8)**	**6**
**Mark Selby (ENG) (5)**	**6**
Stuart Carrington (ENG)	2
Jimmy Robertson (ENG) (28)	3
**Xiao Guodong (CHN)**	**6**
**Marco Fu (HKG)**	**6**
Sanderson Lam (ENG)	0
**Tom Ford (ENG) (21)**	**6**
Cao Yupeng (CHN)	0
Jamie Jones (WAL)	3
**Ricky Walden (ENG) (20)**	**6**
Tian Pengfei (CHN)	0
**Barry Hawkins (ENG) (13)**	**6**
**Thepchaiya Un-Nooh (THA)**	**6**
Matthew Selt (ENG) (29)	5
Oliver Lines (ENG)	3
**Mark Allen (NIR) (4)**	**6**

**Last 32**; Best of 11 frames
Judd Trump (ENG) (1)	3
**Stephen Maguire (SCO) (32)**	**6**
**Ryan Day (WAL) (16)**	**6**
Ross Muir (SCO)	1
Dylan Emery (WAL)	1
**John Higgins (SCO) (9)**	**6**
**Jordan Brown (NIR)**	**6**
Kyren Wilson (ENG) (8)	4
**Mark Selby (ENG) (5)**	**6**
Xiao Guodong (CHN)	2
Marco Fu (HKG)	3
**Tom Ford (ENG) (21)**	**6**
Ricky Walden (ENG) (20)	4
**Barry Hawkins (ENG) (13)**	**6**
**Thepchaiya Un-Nooh (THA)**	**6**
Mark Allen (NIR) (4)	3

**Last 16**; Best of 11 frames
**Stephen Maguire (SCO) (32)**	**6**
Ryan Day (WAL) (16)	4
John Higgins (SCO) (9)	3
**Jordan Brown (NIR)**	**6**
Mark Selby (ENG) (5)	3
**Tom Ford (ENG) (21)**	**6**
**Barry Hawkins (ENG) (13)**	**6**
Thepchaiya Un-Nooh (THA)	5

**Quarter-finals**; Best of 11 frames
Stephen Maguire (SCO) (32)	5
**Jordan Brown (NIR)**	**6**
**Tom Ford (ENG) (21)**	**6**
Barry Hawkins (ENG) (13)	4

**Semi-finals**; Best of 17 frames
Jordan Brown (NIR)	6
**Tom Ford (ENG) (21)**	**9**

=== Bottom half ===
**Last 64**; Best of 11 frames
**Ronnie O'Sullivan (ENG) (3)**	**6**
Mark Joyce (ENG)	3
Si Jiahui (CHN) (30)	4
**Jak Jones (WAL)**	**6**
**Jack Lisowski (ENG) (14)**	**6**
Scott Donaldson (SCO)	4
**Anthony McGill (SCO) (19)**	**6**
Sam Craigie (ENG)	3
Matthew Stevens (WAL)	5
**Stuart Bingham (ENG) (22)**	**6**
John Astley (ENG)	5
**Ali Carter (ENG) (11)**	**6**
Anthony Hamilton (ENG)	0
**Zhou Yuelong (CHN) (27)**	**6**
**Daniel Wells (WAL)**	**6**
Neil Robertson (AUS) (6)	1
Shaun Murphy (ENG) (7)	3
**Dominic Dale (WAL)**	**6**
Chris Wakelin (ENG) (26)	1
**Lyu Haotian (CHN)**	**6**
Mark Williams (WAL) (10)	3
**Zhang Anda (CHN)**	**6**
Noppon Saengkham (THA) (23)	5
**Liam Pullen (ENG)**	**6**
Robbie Williams (ENG)	4
**Gary Wilson (ENG) (18)**	**6**
Long Zehuang (CHN)	4
**Ding Junhui (CHN) (15)**	**6**
**Pang Junxu (CHN)**	**6**
Fan Zhengyi (CHN) (31)	5
**Mark Davis (ENG)**	**6**
Luca Brecel (BEL) (2)	3

**Last 32**; Best of 11 frames
**Ronnie O'Sullivan (ENG) (3)**	**6**
Jak Jones (WAL)	4
Jack Lisowski (ENG) (14)	2
**Anthony McGill (SCO) (19)**	**6**
Stuart Bingham (ENG) (22)	4
**Ali Carter (ENG) (11)**	**6**
Zhou Yuelong (CHN) (27)	1
**Daniel Wells (WAL)**	**6**
Dominic Dale (WAL)	3
**Lyu Haotian (CHN)**	**6**
**Zhang Anda (CHN)**	**6**
Liam Pullen (ENG)	3
Gary Wilson (ENG) (18)	5
**Ding Junhui (CHN) (15)**	**6**
**Pang Junxu (CHN)**	**6**
Mark Davis (ENG)	3

**Last 16**; Best of 11 frames
**Ronnie O'Sullivan (ENG) (3)**	**6**
Anthony McGill (SCO) (19)	2
**Ali Carter (ENG) (11)**	**6**
Daniel Wells (WAL)	1
Lyu Haotian (CHN)	3
**Zhang Anda (CHN)**	**6**
**Ding Junhui (CHN) (15)**	**6**
Pang Junxu (CHN)	2

**Quarter-finals**; Best of 11 frames
**Ronnie O'Sullivan (ENG) (3)**	**6**
Ali Carter (ENG) (11)	4
**Zhang Anda (CHN)**	**6**
Ding Junhui (CHN) (15)	3

**Semi-finals**; Best of 17 frames
Ronnie O'Sullivan (ENG) (3)	6
**Zhang Anda (CHN)**	**9**

=== Final ===
Final: Best of 19 frames. Referee: Lyu Xilin; Tianjin People's Stadium, Tianjin, China, 12 November 2023
Tom Ford (21); England	6–**10**	**Zhang Anda**; China
Afternoon: **74**–24, 0–**74**, 0–**147** (147), **94**–29, 14–**57**, **73**–17, **51**–50, 5–**113**, 0–**101** (101); Evening: **121**–5, 36–**100**, 0–**110**, 6–**125** (108), 36–**70**, **76**–1, 51–**70**
(frame 4) 93	Highest break	**147** (frame 3)
0	Century breaks	**3**

== Qualifying ==
Qualification for the tournament took place from 18 to 23 September 2023 at the Ponds Forge International Sports Centre in Sheffield, England. Numbers in parentheses after the players' names denote the top 32 seeded players, whilst players in bold denote match winners.

=== Tianjin ===
Qualifying matches featuring the defending champion (Judd Trump), the top two players in the world rankings (Ronnie O'Sullivan and Luca Brecel), the two highest ranked Chinese players (Ding Junhui and Zhou Yuelong), and four Chinese wildcards (Gong Chenzhi, Bai Yulu, Wang Xinbo, and Wang Xinzhong) were held over to be played in Tianjin. The results of the held over matches played in Tianjin on 5 November were as follows:

==== Morning session ====
- Gong Chenzhi (CHN) 5–**6** **Wang Xinzhong** (CHN) (Note: Pre-qualifying match played in the morning session on 5 November between two of the Chinese wildcards (Gong Chenzhi and Wang Xinzhong) to determine who would face Judd Trump later that day.)
- Ben Woollaston (ENG) 4–**6** **Wang Xinbo** (CHN)
- **Anthony Hamilton** (ENG) **6**–0 Bai Yulu (CHN)

==== Afternoon session ====
- **Luca Brecel** (BEL) (2) **6**–2 Daniel Womersley (ENG) (Note: Ahmed Aly Elsayed withdrew and was replaced by Daniel Womersley.)
- **Ding Junhui** (CHN) (15) **6**–1 Ian Burns (ENG)
- **Zhou Yuelong** (CHN) (27) **6**–0 Martin O'Donnell (ENG)

==== Evening session ====
- **Ronnie O'Sullivan** (ENG) (3) **6**–1 Ken Doherty (IRL)
- **Judd Trump** (ENG) (1) **6**–0 Wang Xinzhong (CHN)

=== Sheffield ===
The results of the qualifying matches played in Sheffield were as follows:

==== 18 September ====
- **Stephen Maguire** (SCO) (32) **6**–2 Peng Yisong (CHN)
- Wu Yize (CHN) 3–**6** **Ross Muir** (SCO)
- **Tian Pengfei** (CHN) **6**–3 Stephen Hendry (SCO)
- Yuan Sijun (CHN) 5–**6** **Long Zehuang** (CHN)
- **Michael White** (WAL) **6**–3 Himanshu Jain (IND)
- **Ryan Day** (WAL) (16) **6**–1 Mink Nutcharut (THA)
- **Jackson Page** (WAL) **6**–3 Liam Graham (SCO)
- **Mark Joyce** (ENG) **6**–3 Andy Lee (HKG)
- **Barry Hawkins** (ENG) (13) **6**–0 Andrew Pagett (WAL) (Note: In the qualifying match between Barry Hawkins and Andrew Pagett Pagett lost the fifth frame on the three-miss-rule.)
- **Matthew Selt** (ENG) (29) **6**–1 Jimmy White (ENG)
- **Robbie Williams** (ENG) **6**–3 Ben Mertens (BEL)
- **Jordan Brown** (NIR) **6**–5 Sean O'Sullivan (ENG)

==== 19 September ====
- Xu Si (CHN) 4–**6** **Stuart Carrington** (ENG)
- **Cao Yupeng** (CHN) **6**–0 Ashley Hugill (ENG)
- **Thepchaiya Un-Nooh** (THA) **6**–1 Andrew Higginson (ENG)
- **Matthew Stevens** (WAL) **6**–4 Liu Hongyu (CHN)
- Joe Perry (ENG) (24) 3–**6** **Dylan Emery** (WAL)
- **David Grace** (ENG) **6**–2 Jenson Kendrick (ENG)
- **David Gilbert** (ENG) (25) **6**–0 James Cahill (ENG)
- Andy Hicks (ENG) 2–**6** **Sanderson Lam** (ENG)
- **Tom Ford** (ENG) (21) **6**–4 Stan Moody (ENG)
- **Anthony McGill** (SCO) (19) **6**–3 Alfie Burden (ENG)

==== 20 September ====
- **Xiao Guodong** (CHN) **6**–4 Ishpreet Singh Chadha (IND)
- **Sam Craigie** (ENG) **6**–1 Rory Thor (MAS)
- **Stuart Bingham** (ENG) (22) **6**–0 Xing Zihao (CHN)
- **Zhang Anda** (CHN) **6**–3 Alexander Ursenbacher (SUI)
- **Jimmy Robertson** (ENG) (28) **6**–2 Anton Kazakov (UKR)
- **Noppon Saengkham** (THA) (23) **6**–3 Victor Sarkis (BRA)
- Graeme Dott (SCO) 4–**6** **Liam Pullen** (ENG) (Note: In the qualifying match between Liam Pullen and Graeme Dott, Dott lost the first frame on the three-miss-rule.)
- **Hossein Vafaei** (IRN) (17) **6**–1 Reanne Evans (ENG)
- **Gary Wilson** (ENG) (18) **6**–0 Mohamed Ibrahim (EGY)
- **Mark Davis** (ENG) **6**–4 Rod Lawler (ENG)

==== 21 September ====
- **Mark Allen** (NIR) (4) **6**–2 Ma Hailong (CHN)
- **Jack Lisowski** (ENG) (14) **6**–3 He Guoqiang (CHN)
- **Lyu Haotian** (CHN) **6**–5 David Lilley (ENG)
- **Fan Zhengyi** (CHN) (31) **6**–2 Mostafa Dorgham (EGY)
- **Elliot Slessor** (ENG) **6**–2 Hammad Miah (ENG)
- **Kyren Wilson** (ENG) (8) **6**–3 Adam Duffy (ENG)
- **Mark Selby** (ENG) (5) **6**–2 Muhammad Asif (PAK)
- **Jamie Jones** (WAL) **6**–4 Ashley Carty (ENG)
- **Mark Williams** (WAL) (10) **6**–0 Rebecca Kenna (ENG)

==== 22 September ====
- Robert Milkins (ENG) (12) 4–**6** **Marco Fu** (HKG)
- **Si Jiahui** (CHN) (30) **6**–5 Julien Leclercq (BEL)
- Jamie Clarke (WAL) 5–**6** **John Astley** (ENG)
- **Dominic Dale** (WAL) **6**–3 Oliver Brown (ENG)
- **Joe O'Connor** (ENG) **6**–1 Baipat Siripaporn (THA)
- **Ali Carter** (ENG) (11) **6**–2 Allan Taylor (ENG)
- **Shaun Murphy** (ENG) (7) **6**–1 Andres Petrov (EST)
- **John Higgins** (SCO) (9) **6**–1 Manasawin Phetmalaikul (THA)
- **Neil Robertson** (AUS) (6) **6**–4 Ryan Thomerson (AUS)
- **Chris Wakelin** (ENG) (26) **6**–0 Dean Young (SCO)

==== 23 September ====
- **Ricky Walden** (ENG) (20) **6**–1 Jiang Jun (CHN)
- **Scott Donaldson** (SCO) **6**–4 Louis Heathcote (ENG)
- **Pang Junxu** (CHN) **6**–3 Zak Surety (ENG)
- **Oliver Lines** (ENG) **6**–4 Lukas Kleckers (GER)
- **Jak Jones** (WAL) **6**–2 Aaron Hill (IRL)
- Liam Highfield (ENG) 2–**6** **Daniel Wells** (WAL)

== Century breaks ==
=== Main stage centuries ===
A total of 112 century breaks were made during the main stage of the tournament.

- 147, 138, 128, 128, 124, 114, 108, 108, 104, 101 – Zhang Anda
- 142, 106, 104 – Kyren Wilson
- 141, 116, 114 – Thepchaiya Un-Nooh
- 141, 116, 109 – Judd Trump
- 139, 134, 130, 130, 115, 102 – Ding Junhui
- 139, 123, 121, 114 – Barry Hawkins
- 138 – Robbie Williams
- 137, 118 – Jack Lisowski
- 137, 111 – Mark Allen
- 136, 122 – Dylan Emery
- 135, 133, 125, 109, 106, 101, 100 – Tom Ford
- 134, 117, 116, 115, 104, 102 – Jordan Brown
- 134, 112 – Stuart Bingham
- 134 – Noppon Saengkham
- 133, 131, 130, 116, 112, 110 – Ronnie O'Sullivan
- 133, 129, 123, 109 – Anthony McGill
- 132, 132 – Dominic Dale
- 132, 130, 107 – Mark Davis
- 132, 126 – Daniel Wells
- 130, 103, 101 – Jak Jones
- 130 – Matthew Stevens
- 130 – Lyu Haotian
- 130 – Pang Junxu
- 128, 118, 116, 115, 104 – Stephen Maguire
- 128 – Scott Donaldson
- 127, 127, 103 – Ryan Day
- 124, 118, 111, 107, 106, 102 – Ali Carter
- 120, 107, 105, 102 – John Higgins
- 120, 104 – Anthony Hamilton
- 118, 108, 104 – Zhou Yuelong
- 118 – Chris Wakelin
- 117 – Mark Williams
- 116 – John Astley
- 113 – Xiao Guodong
- 111 – Long Zehuang
- 110 – Mark Selby
- 106 – Jackson Page
- 106 – Gary Wilson
- 105 – Ben Woollaston
- 104 – Jamie Jones
- 103 – Si Jiahui
- 102 – Oliver Lines
- 101 – David Gilbert

=== Qualifying stage centuries ===
A total of 43 century breaks were made during the qualifying stage of the tournament.

- 147, 128 – Ryan Day
- 141, 130 – Chris Wakelin
- 138, 134 – Elliot Slessor
- 137, 115 – John Higgins
- 135 – Robbie Williams
- 131 – Joe O'Connor
- 126 – Jordan Brown
- 125 – Scott Donaldson
- 124, 113 – Mark Allen
- 124 – Jak Jones
- 123, 117 – Noppon Saengkham
- 122 – Julien Leclercq
- 119, 101 – Liam Pullen
- 118, 112 – Mark Williams
- 118 – Jimmy Robertson
- 114 – Ma Hailong
- 113 – Rod Lawler
- 112 – Ross Muir
- 111 – Cao Yupeng
- 110 – Liu Hongyu
- 109 – Muhammad Asif
- 109 – Marco Fu
- 108 – Lyu Haotian
- 106, 105 – Hossein Vafaei
- 104 – Neil Robertson
- 103, 103 – Gary Wilson
- 103 – Barry Hawkins
- 102 – Long Zehuang
- 102 – David Lilley
- 102 – Mark Selby
- 100 – Sanderson Lam
- 100 – Jamie Jones
- 100 – Pang Junxu
