= 2017 EBSA European Snooker Championship =

EBSA European Snooker Championships
Tournament information
- Dates: 13–19 March 2016
- City: Nicosia
- Country: Cyprus
- Organisation: EBSA
- Winner's share: €3,300
- Highest break: (Poland) Adam Stefanów (137)

Final
- Champion: (Scotland) Chris Totten
- Runner-up: (Estonia) Andres Petrov
- Score: 7–3

The 2017 EBSA European Snooker Championship was an amateur snooker tournament that took place from 13 February to 19 March 2017 in Nicosia, Cyprus. It was the 26th edition of the EBSA European Snooker Championships and also doubles as a qualification event for the World Snooker Tour.

The tournament was won by 28th seed Chris Totten who defeated Estonia's Andres Petrov 7–3 in the final. As a result, Totten was given a two-year card on the professional World Snooker Tour for the 2017/2018 and 2018/2019 seasons.

== Results ==
=== Round 1 ===
Best of 7 frames

65	(Israel) Shay Arama	2–4	64	(Romania) Andrei Orzan
69	(Albania) Dorjan Maknori	0–4	60	(Finland) Patrik Tiihonen
61	(Northern Ireland) Conor McCormack	4–2	68	(Italy) Gianmarco Tonini

67	(Bulgaria) Teodor Chomovski	2–4	62	(Bulgaria) Viktor Iliev
63	(Latvia) Maris Volajs	4–1	66	(Scotland) Dylan Gault

=== Round 2 ===
Best of 7 frames

1	(Poland) Adam Stefanów	4–0	64	(Romania) Andrei Orzan
33	(Wales) Kishan Hirani	2–4	32	(Belgium) Jurian Heusdens
17	(Poland) Mateusz Baranowski	4–1	48	(Israel) Amir Nardeia
49	(Finland) Antti Mannila	2–4	16	(Wales) Alex Taubman
9	(Wales) Jamie Clarke	4–0	56	(Belgium) Jurgen Van Roy
41	(Germany) Felix Frede	4–1	24	(Republic of Ireland) Philip Browne
25	(Poland) Marcin Nitschke	4–1	40	(Jersey) Ross Symes
57	(France) Niel Vincent	3–4	8	(Republic of Ireland) Michael Judge
5	(England) David Lilley	4–0	60	(Finland) Patrik Tiihonen
37	(Netherlands) Joris Maas	1–4	28	(Scotland) Chris Totten
21	(Israel) Maor Shalom	4–1	16	(Sweden) Kirill Petrov
53	(Bulgaria) Georgi Velichkov	0–4	12	(Malta) Brian Cini
13	(Israel) Shachar Ruberg	4–1	52	(Belgium) Laurens De Staelen
45	(Finland) Heikki Niva	1–4	20	(Germany) Simon Lichtenberg
29	(Albania) Eklent Kaçi	4–3	36	(England) Lewis Gillen
61	(Northern Ireland) Conor McCormack	0–4	4	(Poland) Kacper Filipiak

3	(Wales) Andrew Pagett	4–1	62	(Bulgaria) Viktor Iliev
35	(Cyprus) George Louka	4–0	30	(Hungary) Zsolt Fenyvesi
19	(England) Peter Lines	4–0	46	(England) Wayne Townsend
51	(Scotland) Sean Iqbal	1–4	14	(Switzerland) Alexander Ursenbacher
11	(Malta) Jason Peplow	4–0	54	(Serbia) Marko Stoilkovic
43	(Latvia) Rodion Judin	3–4	22	(England) Oliver Brown
27	(Northern Ireland) Declan Brennan	4–2	38	(Russia) Ivan Kakovsky
59	(Malta) Aaron Busuttil	2–4	6	(Iceland) Kristján Helgason
7	(Scotland) Michael Collumb	3–4	58	(Israel) Nadav Biton
39	(Iceland) Sigurdur Kristjansson	1–4	26	(Wales) Jackson Page
23	(Scotland) Lee Mein	2–4	42	(Israel) David Vaitzman
55	(Wales) Nathan Davenport	3–4	10	(Republic of Ireland) John Farrell
15	(Estonia) Andres Petrov	4–1	50	(Croatia) Jan Jelenić
47	(Cyprus) Kyriacos Kyriacou	0–4	18	(Northern Ireland) Jordan Brown
31	(Malta) Duncan Bezzina	3–4	34	(Republic of Ireland) TJ Dowling
63	(Latvia) Maris Volajs	1–4	2	(Republic of Ireland) Brendan O'Donoghue

Round 2 Best of 7 frames
1	(Poland) Adam Stefanów	4
32	(Belgium) Jurian Heusdens	2
17	(Poland) Mateusz Baranowski	1
16	(Wales) Alex Taubman	4
9	(Wales) Jamie Clarke	4
41	(Germany) Felix Frede	1
25	(Poland) Marcin Nitschke	2
8	(Republic of Ireland) Michael Judge	4
5	(England) David Lilley	0
28	(Scotland) Chris Totten	4
21	(Israel) Maor Shalom	2
12	(Malta) Brian Cini	4
13	(Israel) Shachar Ruberg	4
20	(Germany) Simon Lichtenberg	1
29	(Albania) Eklent Kaçi	1
4	(Poland) Kacper Filipiak	4
3	(Wales) Andrew Pagett	4
35	(Cyprus) George Louka	1
19	(England) Peter Lines	4
14	(Switzerland) Alexander Ursenbacher	2
11	(Malta) Jason Peplow	2
22	(England) Oliver Brown	4
27	(Northern Ireland) Declan Brennan	2
6	(Iceland) Kristján Helgason	4
58	(Israel) Nadav Biton	2
26	(Wales) Jackson Page	4
42	(Israel) David Vaitzman	3
10	(Republic of Ireland) John Farrell	4
15	(Estonia) Andres Petrov	4
18	(Northern Ireland) Jordan Brown	1
34	(Republic of Ireland) TJ Dowling	1
2	(Republic of Ireland) Brendan O'Donoghue	4

Round 3 Best of 9 frames
1	(Poland) Adam Stefanów	5
16	(Wales) Alex Taubman	4
9	(Wales) Jamie Clarke	5
8	(Republic of Ireland) Michael Judge	2
28	(Scotland) Chris Totten	5
12	(Malta) Brian Cini	4
13	(Israel) Shachar Ruberg	3
4	(Poland) Kacper Filipiak	5
3	(Wales) Andrew Pagett	5
19	(England) Peter Lines	3
22	(England) Oliver Brown	5
6	(Iceland) Kristján Helgason	2
26	(Wales) Jackson Page	3
10	(Republic of Ireland) John Farrell	5
15	(Estonia) Andres Petrov	5
2	(Republic of Ireland) Brendan O'Donoghue	2

Quarter-Finals; Best of 9 frames
1	(Poland) Adam Stefanów	2
9	(Wales) Jamie Clarke	5
28	(Scotland) Chris Totten	5
4	(Poland) Kacper Filipiak	3
3	(Wales) Andrew Pagett	5
22	(England) Oliver Brown	4
10	(Republic of Ireland) John Farrell	2
15	(Estonia) Andres Petrov	5

Semi-Finals; Best of 11 frames
9	(Wales) Jamie Clarke	4
28	(Scotland) Chris Totten	6
3	(Wales) Andrew Pagett	3
15	(Estonia) Andres Petrov	6

Final; Best of 13 frames
28	(Scotland) Chris Totten	7
15	(Estonia) Andres Petrov	3
