= Chris Totten =

Scottish snooker player

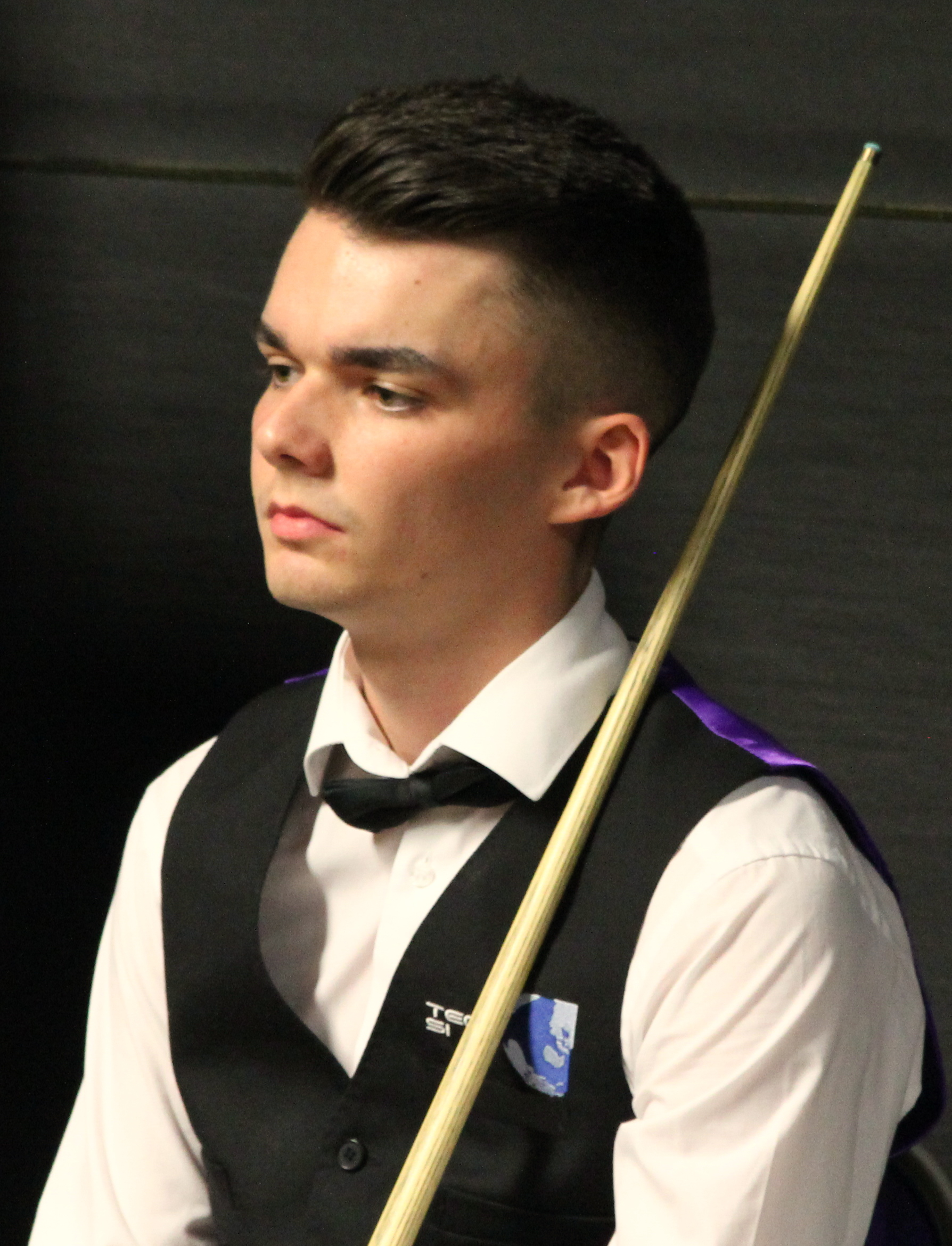
- Paul Hunter Classic 2017

Personal information
- Born: 5 December 1998 (age 27) Wishaw, Lanarkshire

Sport
- Country: Scotland
- Sport: Snooker
- Professional: 2017–2019, 2024–present
- Highest ranking: 84 (July 2025)
- Best ranking finish: Last 32 (x2)

Chris Totten (born 5 December 1998) is a Scottish professional snooker player. He is a former EBSA European Snooker Champion. He first earned a two-year card to compete on the World Snooker Tour in 2017, and returned to the professional tour in 2024.

== Career ==
In March 2017, Totten entered the 2017 EBSA European Snooker Championship as the number 28 seed; he advanced to the final where he defeated Andres Petrov 7–3 in the final to win the championship. As a result, Totten was given a two-year card on the professional World Snooker Tour for the 2017–18 and 2018–19 seasons.

Totten gained a new two-year card in 2024, qualifying through the second event of 2024 Q School.

== Performance and rankings timeline ==
| Tournament | 2016/ 17 | 2017/ 18 | 2018/ 19 | 2023/ 24 | 2024/ 25 | 2025/ 26 |
|---|---|---|---|---|---|---|
| Ranking (Note: It shows the ranking at the beginning of the season) | (Note: He was an amateur) | (Note: New players on the Main Tour don't have a ranking) | 84 | | | 83 |
Ranking tournaments
| Championship League | Non-Ranking Event | | | RR | RR | RR |
| Saudi Arabia Masters | Tournament Not Held | | | | 2R | 2R |
| Wuhan Open | Not Held | | | A | LQ | LQ |
| English Open | A | 1R | 1R | A | LQ | LQ |
| British Open | Not Held | | | A | LQ | LQ |
| Xi'an Grand Prix | Tournament Not Held | | | | LQ | LQ |
| Northern Ireland Open | A | 1R | 3R | A | LQ | LQ |
| International Championship | A | LQ | LQ | A | LQ | LQ |
| UK Championship | A | 1R | 1R | A | LQ | LQ |
| Shoot Out | A | 1R | 1R | A | 1R | 1R |
| Scottish Open | 1R | 3R | 1R | A | LQ | LQ |
| German Masters | A | LQ | LQ | A | LQ | LQ |
| World Grand Prix | DNQ | DNQ | DNQ | DNQ | DNQ | DNQ |
| Players Championship | DNQ | DNQ | DNQ | DNQ | DNQ | DNQ |
| Welsh Open | A | 1R | 1R | A | LQ | LQ |
| World Open | A | LQ | LQ | A | WD | WD |
| Tour Championship | Not Held | | DNQ | DNQ | DNQ | DNQ |
| World Championship | LQ | LQ | LQ | A | LQ | LQ |
Former ranking tournaments
| Shanghai Masters | A | 1R | Non-Ranking Event | | | |
| Riga Masters | A | LQ | LQ | Not Held | | |
| Paul Hunter Classic | A | 1R | WD | Not Held | | |
| China Championship | NR | LQ | LQ | Not Held | | |
| Indian Open | A | LQ | LQ | Not Held | | |
| Gibraltar Open | A | 1R | WD | Not Held | | |
| China Open | A | 1R | LQ | Not Held | | |
| European Masters | A | LQ | 1R | A | Not Held | |

Performance Table Legend
| LQ | lost in the qualifying draw | #R | lost in the early rounds of the tournament (WR = Wildcard round, RR = Round robin) | QF | lost in the quarter-finals |
| SF | lost in the semi-finals | F | lost in the final | W | won the tournament |
| DNQ | did not qualify for the tournament | A | did not participate in the tournament | WD | withdrew from the tournament |

| NH / Not Held | means an event was not held. |
| NR / Non-Ranking Event | means an event is/was no longer a ranking event. |
| R / Ranking Event | means an event is/was a ranking event. |
| MR / Minor-Ranking Event | means an event is/was a minor-ranking event. |

== Career finals ==
=== Amateur finals: 5 (4 titles) ===
| Outcome | No. | Year | Championship | Opponent in the final | Score |
|---|---|---|---|---|---|
| Winner | 1. | 2016 | Scottish Amateur Championship | (Scotland) Craig MacGillivray | 7–4 |
| Winner | 2. | 2017 | EBSA European Snooker Championship | (Estonia) Andres Petrov | 7–3 |
| Winner | 3. | 2021 | Scottish Amateur Championship (2) | (Scotland) Michael Collumb | 7–6 |
| Runner-up | 1. | 2023 | Scottish Amateur Championship | (Scotland) Michael Collumb | 3–7 |
| Winner | 4. | 2024 | Scottish Amateur Championship (3) | (Scotland) Ross Vallance | 7–5 |
