= 2023 Championship League (ranking) =

Snooker tournament held June and July 2023

Tournament information
- Dates: 26 June – 21 July 2023
- Venue: Morningside Arena
- City: Leicester
- Country: England
- Organisation: Matchroom Sport
- Format: Ranking event
- Total prize fund: £328,000
- Winner's share: £33,000
- Highest break: Cao Yupeng (CHN) (145)

Final
- Champion: Shaun Murphy (ENG)
- Runner-up: Mark Williams (WAL)
- Score: 3‍–‍0

The 2023 Championship League was a professional ranking snooker tournament that took place from 26 June to 21 July 2023 at the Morningside Arena in Leicester, England. The event featured 128 players and was played as three rounds of round-robin groups of four, before a best-of-five final. It was the fourth edition of the ranking version of the Championship League, and the first ranking tournament of the 2023‍–‍24 season.

Luca Brecel was the reigning champion, having defeated Lu Ning 3‍–‍1 in the final of the previous ranking edition of the tournament. However, he opted not to enter the draw for the tournament and consequently was not defending the title. Other notable players choosing not to enter the draw were Mark Selby, Jack Lisowski, John Higgins, Mark Allen and Ding Junhui. Six players who were due to enter the tournament, withdrew and were replaced including Ronnie O'Sullivan, Neil Robertson and Marco Fu.

Shaun Murphy won the tournament, defeating Mark Williams 3‍–‍0 in the final to claim his twelfth ranking title.

== Tournament format ==
The 2023 Championship League took place from 26 June to 21 July 2023 at the Morningside Arena in Leicester, England. 128 players took part in the event. The competition began with 32 rounds of group matches with each group consisting of four players. Two groups were played to a finish every day during four blocks using a two-table setup in the arena. The groups were contested using a round-robin format, with six matches played in each group. All matches in group play were played as best of four frames, with three points awarded for a win and one point for a draw. Group positions were determined by points scored, frame difference and then head-to-head results between players who were tied. Places that were still tied were then determined by the highest break made in the group.

The 32 players that topped the group tables qualified for the group winners' stage, consisting of eight groups of four players. The eight winners from the group winners' stage qualified for the two final groups, with the final taking place later on the same day. The winner took the Championship League title and a place at the 2023 Champion of Champions.

There were 20 players not currently on the professional tour who were entered into the draw as follows:

- Alfie Davies
- Ryan Davies
- Steven Hallworth
- Daniel Holoyda (Note: Replacement for a withdrawn player.)
- Michael Holt (Note: Unranked player who won a Stage 1 group but did not progress further.)
- Duane Jones
- Peter Lines
- Sean McAllister
- Rory McLeod
- Josh Mulholland
- Florian Nüßle
- Jamie O'Neill
- Barry Pinches
- Haydon Pinhey
- Fergal Quinn
- Craig Steadman
- Alex Taubman
- Joshua Thomond
- Chris Totten
- Sydney Wilson

=== Prize fund ===
The breakdown of prize money for the tournament is shown below.

Stage One

- Winner: £3,000
- Runner-up: £2,000
- Third place: £1,000
- Fourth place: £0

Stage Two

- Winner: £4,000
- Runner-up: £3,000
- Third place: £2,000
- Fourth place: £1,000

Stage Three

- Winner: £6,000
- Runner-up: £4,000
- Third place: £2,000
- Fourth place: £1,000

Final

- Winner: £20,000
- Runner-up: £10,000

- Tournament total: £328,000

== Stage One ==
Stage One consisted of 32 groups, each containing four players.

=== Order of play ===
Date	Group
26 June	Group 03 (Note: Neil Robertson and Liam Highfield were due to play in Group 3 but they both withdrew and were replaced by Craig Steadman and Sean McAllister respectively.)
26 June	Group 30
27 June	Group 11
27 June	Group 21
28 June	Group 10
28 June	Group 22
29 June	Group 05 (Note: Asjad Iqbal was due to play in Group 5 but he withdrew and was replaced by Josh Mulholland.)
29 June	Group 29

Date	Group
30 June	Group 06 (Note: Rory Thor was due to play in Group 6 but he withdrew and was replaced by Daniel Holoyda.)
30 June	Group 27 (Note: Marco Fu was due to play in Group 27 but he withdrew and was replaced by Joshua Thomond.)
3 July	Group 16
3 July	Group 32
4 July	Group 15
4 July	Group 28
5 July	Group 17
5 July	Group 26

Date	Group
6 July	Group 07
6 July	Group 24
7 July	Group 08
7 July	Group 23
8 July	Group 20
8 July	Group 25
10 July	Group 01 (Note: Ronnie O'Sullivan was due to play in Group 1 but he withdrew and was replaced by Michael Holt.)
10 July	Group 19

Date	Group
11 July	Group 02
11 July	Group 18
12 July	Group 04
12 July	Group 12
13 July	Group 13
13 July	Group 31
14 July	Group 09
14 July	Group 14

=== Group 1 ===
Group 1 was played on 10 July. Michael Holt won the group and advanced to Stage 2, Group A.

==== Matches ====
- Scott Donaldson 1–3 Michael Holt
- Rod Lawler 0–3 Alfie Burden
- Scott Donaldson 1–3 Alfie Burden
- Rod Lawler 3–1 Michael Holt
- Alfie Burden 0–3 Michael Holt
- Scott Donaldson 2–2 Rod Lawler

==== Table ====
Pos.	Player	P	W	D	L	FW	FL	FD	HB	Pts
1	Michael Holt (ENG)	3	2	0	1	7	4	+3	134	6
2	Alfie Burden (ENG)	3	2	0	1	6	4	+2	83	6
3	Rod Lawler (ENG)	3	1	1	1	5	6	−1	69	4
4	Scott Donaldson (SCO)	3	0	1	2	4	8	−4	58	1

=== Group 2 ===
Group 2 was played on 11 July. Judd Trump won the group and advanced to Stage 2, Group B.

==== Matches ====
- Judd Trump 3–0 Reanne Evans
- Xu Si 3–0 Jimmy White
- Judd Trump 3–0 Jimmy White
- Xu Si 2–2 Reanne Evans
- Jimmy White 1–3 Reanne Evans
- Judd Trump 2–2 Xu Si

==== Table ====
Pos.	Player	P	W	D	L	FW	FL	FD	HB	Pts
1	Judd Trump (ENG)	3	2	1	0	8	2	+6	120	7
2	Xu Si (CHN)	3	1	2	0	7	4	+3	73	5
3	Reanne Evans (ENG)	3	1	1	1	5	6	−1		4
4	Jimmy White (ENG)	3	0	0	3	1	9	−8		0

=== Group 3 ===
Group 3 was played on 26 June. Ashley Carty won the group and advanced to Stage 2, Group C.

==== Matches ====
- Craig Steadman 2–2 Ashley Carty
- Sean McAllister 3–1 Adam Duffy
- Craig Steadman 2–2 Adam Duffy
- Sean McAllister 2–2 Ashley Carty
- Adam Duffy 0–3 Ashley Carty
- Craig Steadman 2–2 Sean McAllister

==== Table ====
Pos.	Player	P	W	D	L	FW	FL	FD	HB	Pts
1	Ashley Carty (ENG)	3	1	2	0	7	4	+3	96	5
2	Sean McAllister (ENG)	3	1	2	0	7	5	+2	140	5
3	Craig Steadman (ENG)	3	0	3	0	6	6	0	111	3
4	Adam Duffy (ENG)	3	0	1	2	3	8	−5	116	1

=== Group 4 ===
Group 4 was played on 12 July. Shaun Murphy won the group and advanced to Stage 2, Group D.

==== Matches ====
- Shaun Murphy 3–0 Andrew Pagett
- Tian Pengfei 3–1 Lukas Kleckers
- Shaun Murphy 3–1 Lukas Kleckers
- Tian Pengfei 3–1 Andrew Pagett
- Lukas Kleckers 3–0 Andrew Pagett
- Shaun Murphy 3–1 Tian Pengfei

==== Table ====
Pos.	Player	P	W	D	L	FW	FL	FD	HB	Pts
1	Shaun Murphy (ENG)	3	3	0	0	9	2	+7	110	9
2	Tian Pengfei (CHN)	3	2	0	1	7	5	+2	90	6
3	Lukas Kleckers (GER)	3	1	0	2	5	6	−1	116	3
4	Andrew Pagett (WAL)	3	0	0	3	1	9	−8	57	0

=== Group 5 ===
Group 5 was played on 29 June. Kyren Wilson won the group and advanced to Stage 2, Group E.

==== Matches ====
- Kyren Wilson 3–0 Josh Mulholland
- Andy Hicks 1–3 Louis Heathcote
- Kyren Wilson 3–0 Louis Heathcote
- Andy Hicks 3–1 Josh Mulholland
- Josh Mulholland 0–3 Louis Heathcote
- Kyren Wilson 3–1 Andy Hicks

==== Table ====
Pos.	Player	P	W	D	L	FW	FL	FD	HB	Pts
1	Kyren Wilson (ENG)	3	3	0	0	9	1	+8	134	9
2	Louis Heathcote (ENG)	3	2	0	1	6	4	+2	83	6
3	Andy Hicks (ENG)	3	1	0	2	5	7	−2	76	3
4	Josh Mulholland (ENG)	3	0	0	3	1	9	−8		0

=== Group 6 ===
Group 6 was played on 30 June. Mark Williams won the group and advanced to Stage 2, Group F.

==== Matches ====
- Mark Williams 3–0 Daniel Holoyda
- Dylan Emery 3–0 Ken Doherty
- Mark Williams 3–1 Ken Doherty
- Dylan Emery 3–1 Daniel Holoyda
- Ken Doherty 3–0 Daniel Holoyda
- Mark Williams 3–0 Dylan Emery

==== Table ====
Pos.	Player	P	W	D	L	FW	FL	FD	HB	Pts
1	Mark Williams (WAL)	3	3	0	0	9	1	+8	121	9
2	Dylan Emery (WAL)	3	2	0	1	6	4	+2	108	6
3	Ken Doherty (IRL)	3	1	0	2	4	6	−2	105	3
4	Daniel Holoyda (POL)	3	0	0	3	1	9	−8	55	0

=== Group 7 ===
Group 7 was played on 6 July. Long Zehuang won the group and advanced to Stage 2, Group G.

==== Matches ====
- Ali Carter 2–2 Ryan Davies
- Jackson Page 2–2 Long Zehuang
- Ali Carter 1–3 Long Zehuang
- Jackson Page 3–1 Ryan Davies
- Long Zehuang 3–0 Ryan Davies
- Ali Carter 2–2 Jackson Page

==== Table ====
Pos.	Player	P	W	D	L	FW	FL	FD	HB	Pts
1	Long Zehuang (CHN)	3	2	1	0	8	3	+5	94	7
2	Jackson Page (WAL)	3	1	2	0	7	5	+2	117	5
3	Ali Carter (ENG)	3	0	2	1	5	7	−2	86	2
4	Ryan Davies (ENG)	3	0	1	2	3	8	−5	95	1

=== Group 8 ===
Group 8 was played on 7 July. Robert Milkins won the group and advanced to Stage 2, Group H.

==== Matches ====
- Robert Milkins 3–0 Alex Taubman
- Dominic Dale 3–1 Muhammad Asif
- Robert Milkins 2–2 Muhammad Asif
- Dominic Dale 3–1 Alex Taubman
- Muhammad Asif 3–1 Alex Taubman
- Robert Milkins 3–0 Dominic Dale

==== Table ====
Pos.	Player	P	W	D	L	FW	FL	FD	HB	Pts
1	Robert Milkins (ENG)	3	2	1	0	8	2	+6	53	7
2	Dominic Dale (WAL)	3	2	0	1	6	5	+1	64	6
3	Muhammad Asif (PAK)	3	1	1	1	6	6	0	116	4
4	Alex Taubman (WAL)	3	0	0	3	2	9	−7		0

=== Group 9 ===
Group 9 was played on 14 July. John Astley won the group and advanced to Stage 2, Group H.

==== Matches ====
- Gary Wilson 2–2 Ma Hailong
- John Astley 3–1 Mink Nutcharut
- Gary Wilson 2–2 Mink Nutcharut
- John Astley 2–2 Ma Hailong
- Mink Nutcharut 2–2 Ma Hailong
- Gary Wilson 1–3 John Astley

==== Table ====
Pos.	Player	P	W	D	L	FW	FL	FD	HB	Pts
1	John Astley (ENG)	3	2	1	0	8	4	+4	128	7
2	Ma Hailong (CHN)	3	0	3	0	6	6	0	140	3
3	Gary Wilson (ENG)	3	0	2	1	5	7	−2	131	2 (Note: Gary Wilson and Mink Nutcharut finished Group 9 equal on points and frame difference. Their head-to-head was a draw. Wilson took third place in the group over Nutcharut due to having made a higher break (131) in the group.)
4	Mink Nutcharut (THA)	3	0	2	1	5	7	−2	80	2

=== Group 10 ===
Group 10 was played on 28 June. Michael White won the group and advanced to Stage 2, Group G.

==== Matches ====
- Ryan Day 2–2 Jiang Jun
- Michael White 3–1 Himanshu Jain
- Ryan Day 3–0 Himanshu Jain
- Michael White 3–1 Jiang Jun
- Himanshu Jain 0–3 Jiang Jun
- Ryan Day 1–3 Michael White

==== Table ====
Pos.	Player	P	W	D	L	FW	FL	FD	HB	Pts
1	Michael White (WAL)	3	3	0	0	9	3	+6	124	9
2	Ryan Day (WAL)	3	1	1	1	6	5	+1	96	4 (Note: Ryan Day and Jiang Jun finished Group 10 equal on points and frame difference. Their head-to-head was a draw. Day took second place in the group over Jiang due to having made a higher break (96) in the group.)
3	Jiang Jun (CHN)	3	1	1	1	6	5	+1	79	4
4	Himanshu Jain (IND)	3	0	0	3	1	9	−8	58	0

=== Group 11 ===
Group 11 was played on 27 June. Martin O'Donnell won the group and advanced to Stage 2, Group F.

==== Matches ====
- Hossein Vafaei 1–3 Fergal Quinn
- Aaron Hill 0–3 Martin O'Donnell
- Hossein Vafaei 2–2 Martin O'Donnell
- Aaron Hill 3–0 Fergal Quinn
- Martin O'Donnell 3–1 Fergal Quinn
- Hossein Vafaei 3–1 Aaron Hill

==== Table ====
Pos.	Player	P	W	D	L	FW	FL	FD	HB	Pts
1	Martin O'Donnell (ENG)	3	2	1	0	8	3	+5	93	7
2	Hossein Vafaei (IRN)	3	1	1	1	6	6	0	120	4
3	Aaron Hill (IRL)	3	1	0	2	4	6	−2	78	3
4	Fergal Quinn (NIR)	3	1	0	2	4	7	−3	72	3

=== Group 12 ===
Group 12 was played on 12 July. Sanderson Lam won the group and advanced to Stage 2, Group E.

==== Matches ====
- Barry Hawkins 3–1 Jamie O'Neill
- Zhang Anda 1–3 Sanderson Lam
- Barry Hawkins 2–2 Sanderson Lam
- Zhang Anda 3–1 Jamie O'Neill
- Sanderson Lam 3–1 Jamie O'Neill
- Barry Hawkins 2–2 Zhang Anda

==== Table ====
Pos.	Player	P	W	D	L	FW	FL	FD	HB	Pts
1	Sanderson Lam (ENG)	3	2	1	0	8	4	+4	97	7
2	Barry Hawkins (ENG)	3	1	2	0	7	5	+2	73	5
3	Zhang Anda (CHN)	3	1	1	1	6	6	0	138	4
4	Jamie O'Neill (ENG)	3	0	0	3	3	9	−6	52	0

=== Group 13 ===
Group 13 was played on 13 July. David Gilbert won the group and advanced to Stage 2, Group D.

==== Matches ====
- David Gilbert 2–2 Ishpreet Singh Chadha
- Yuan Sijun 3–0 Sean O'Sullivan
- David Gilbert 3–0 Sean O'Sullivan
- Yuan Sijun 3–0 Ishpreet Singh Chadha
- Sean O'Sullivan 0–3 Ishpreet Singh Chadha
- David Gilbert 3–1 Yuan Sijun

==== Table ====
Pos.	Player	P	W	D	L	FW	FL	FD	HB	Pts
1	David Gilbert (ENG)	3	2	1	0	8	3	+5	78	7
2	Yuan Sijun (CHN)	3	2	0	1	7	3	+4	132	6
3	Ishpreet Singh Chadha (IND)	3	1	1	1	5	5	0	94	4
4	Sean O'Sullivan (ENG)	3	0	0	3	0	9	−9		0

=== Group 14 ===
Group 14 was played on 14 July. Liu Hongyu won the group and advanced to Stage 2, Group C.

==== Matches ====
- Ricky Walden 1–3 Liu Hongyu
- David Lilley 3–1 Peng Yisong
- Ricky Walden 2–2 Peng Yisong
- David Lilley 0–3 Liu Hongyu
- Peng Yisong 1–3 Liu Hongyu
- Ricky Walden 2–2 David Lilley

==== Table ====
Pos.	Player	P	W	D	L	FW	FL	FD	HB	Pts
1	Liu Hongyu (CHN)	3	3	0	0	9	2	+7	76	9
2	David Lilley (ENG)	3	1	1	1	5	6	−1	75	4
3	Ricky Walden (ENG)	3	0	2	1	5	7	−2	87	2
4	Peng Yisong (CHN)	3	0	1	2	4	8	−4	111	1

=== Group 15 ===
Group 15 was played on 4 July. Matthew Stevens won the group and advanced to Stage 2, Group B.

==== Matches ====
- Stuart Bingham 2–2 Duane Jones
- Matthew Stevens 3–1 Allan Taylor
- Stuart Bingham 1–3 Allan Taylor
- Matthew Stevens 3–0 Duane Jones
- Allan Taylor 2–2 Duane Jones
- Stuart Bingham 3–1 Matthew Stevens

==== Table ====
Pos.	Player	P	W	D	L	FW	FL	FD	HB	Pts
1	Matthew Stevens (WAL)	3	2	0	1	7	4	+3	57	6
2	Allan Taylor (ENG)	3	1	1	1	6	6	0	129	4 (Note: Allan Taylor and Stuart Bingham finished Group 15 equal on points and frame difference. Taylor won their head-to-head and so took second place in the group over Bingham.)
3	Stuart Bingham (ENG)	3	1	1	1	6	6	0	105	4
4	Duane Jones (WAL)	3	0	2	1	4	7	−3	74	2

=== Group 16 ===
Group 16 was played on 3 July. Ben Woollaston won the group and advanced to Stage 2, Group A.

==== Matches ====
- Jimmy Robertson 1–3 Peter Lines
- Ben Woollaston 3–0 Liam Graham
- Jimmy Robertson 3–1 Liam Graham
- Ben Woollaston 3–0 Peter Lines
- Liam Graham 2–2 Peter Lines
- Jimmy Robertson 2–2 Ben Woollaston

==== Table ====
Pos.	Player	P	W	D	L	FW	FL	FD	HB	Pts
1	Ben Woollaston (ENG)	3	2	1	0	8	2	+6	96	7
2	Jimmy Robertson (ENG)	3	1	1	1	6	6	0	94	4
3	Peter Lines (ENG)	3	1	1	1	5	6	−1	59	4
4	Liam Graham (SCO)	3	0	1	2	3	8	−5	53	1

=== Group 17 ===
Group 17 was played on 5 July. Zhou Yuelong won the group and advanced to Stage 2, Group A.

==== Matches ====
- Zhou Yuelong 3–0 Chris Totten
- Ashley Hugill 3–1 Oliver Brown
- Zhou Yuelong 0–3 Oliver Brown
- Ashley Hugill 1–3 Chris Totten
- Oliver Brown 2–2 Chris Totten
- Zhou Yuelong 3–0 Ashley Hugill

==== Table ====
Pos.	Player	P	W	D	L	FW	FL	FD	HB	Pts
1	Zhou Yuelong (CHN)	3	2	0	1	6	3	+3	105	6
2	Oliver Brown (ENG)	3	1	1	1	6	5	+1		4
3	Chris Totten (SCO)	3	1	1	1	5	6	−1	65	4
4	Ashley Hugill (ENG)	3	1	0	2	4	7	−3	62	3

=== Group 18 ===
Group 18 was played on 11 July. Joe Perry won the group and advanced to Stage 2, Group B.

==== Matches ====
- Joe Perry 2–2 Stuart Carrington
- Jamie Clarke 3–1 Andy Lee
- Joe Perry 3–0 Andy Lee
- Jamie Clarke 3–1 Stuart Carrington
- Andy Lee 0–3 Stuart Carrington
- Joe Perry 3–0 Jamie Clarke

==== Table ====
Pos.	Player	P	W	D	L	FW	FL	FD	HB	Pts
1	Joe Perry (ENG)	3	2	1	0	8	2	+6	128	7
2	Jamie Clarke (WAL)	3	2	0	1	6	5	+1	87	6
3	Stuart Carrington (ENG)	3	1	1	1	6	5	+1	91	4
4	Andy Lee (HKG)	3	0	0	3	1	9	−8		0

=== Group 19 ===
Group 19 was played on 10 July. Noppon Saengkham won the group and advanced to Stage 2, Group C.

==== Matches ====
- Noppon Saengkham 3–0 Ross Muir
- Mark Davis 3–0 Jenson Kendrick
- Noppon Saengkham 3–1 Jenson Kendrick
- Mark Davis 2–2 Ross Muir
- Jenson Kendrick 2–2 Ross Muir
- Noppon Saengkham 2–2 Mark Davis

==== Table ====
Pos.	Player	P	W	D	L	FW	FL	FD	HB	Pts
1	Noppon Saengkham (THA)	3	2	1	0	8	3	+5	69	7
2	Mark Davis (ENG)	3	1	2	0	7	4	+3	105	5
3	Ross Muir (SCO)	3	0	2	1	4	7	−3	104	2
4	Jenson Kendrick (ENG)	3	0	1	2	3	8	−5	74	1

=== Group 20 ===
Group 20 was played on 8 July. James Cahill won the group and advanced to Stage 2, Group D.

==== Matches ====
- Matthew Selt 3–0 Sydney Wilson
- James Cahill 3–0 Andres Petrov
- Matthew Selt 3–0 Andres Petrov
- James Cahill 0–3 Sydney Wilson
- Andres Petrov 2–2 Sydney Wilson
- Matthew Selt 0–3 James Cahill

==== Table ====
Pos.	Player	P	W	D	L	FW	FL	FD	HB	Pts
1	James Cahill (ENG)	3	2	0	1	6	3	+3	87	6 (Note: James Cahill and Matthew Selt finished Group 20 equal on points and frame difference. Cahill won their head-to-head and so topped the group over Selt.)
2	Matthew Selt (ENG)	3	2	0	1	6	3	+3	112	6
3	Sydney Wilson (ENG)	3	1	1	1	5	5	0	60	4
4	Andres Petrov (EST)	3	0	1	2	2	8	−6	58	1

=== Group 21 ===
Group 21 was played on 27 June. Chris Wakelin won the group and advanced to Stage 2, Group E.

==== Matches ====
- Chris Wakelin 3–0 Liam Pullen
- Oliver Lines 2–2 Anton Kazakov
- Chris Wakelin 3–1 Anton Kazakov
- Oliver Lines 2–2 Liam Pullen
- Anton Kazakov 1–3 Liam Pullen
- Chris Wakelin 0–3 Oliver Lines

==== Table ====
Pos.	Player	P	W	D	L	FW	FL	FD	HB	Pts
1	Chris Wakelin (ENG)	3	2	0	1	6	4	+2	85	6
2	Oliver Lines (ENG)	3	1	2	0	7	4	+3	126	5
3	Liam Pullen (ENG)	3	1	1	1	5	6	−1	94	4
4	Anton Kazakov (UKR)	3	0	1	2	4	8	−4	72	1

=== Group 22 ===
Group 22 was played on 28 June. Robbie Williams won the group and advanced to Stage 2, Group F.

==== Matches ====
- Joe O'Connor 1–3 Alfie Davies
- Robbie Williams 2–2 Zak Surety
- Joe O'Connor 3–0 Zak Surety
- Robbie Williams 3–1 Alfie Davies
- Zak Surety 3–0 Alfie Davies
- Joe O'Connor 1–3 Robbie Williams

==== Table ====
Pos.	Player	P	W	D	L	FW	FL	FD	HB	Pts
1	Robbie Williams (ENG)	3	2	1	0	8	4	+4	137	7
2	Zak Surety (ENG)	3	1	1	1	5	5	0	69	4
3	Joe O'Connor (ENG)	3	1	0	2	5	6	−1	80	3
4	Alfie Davies (WAL)	3	1	0	2	4	7	−3	87	3

=== Group 23 ===
Group 23 was played on 7 July. Sam Craigie won the group and advanced to Stage 2, Group G.

==== Matches ====
- Fan Zhengyi 3–0 Ahmed Aly Elsayed
- Sam Craigie 3–0 Fergal O'Brien
- Fan Zhengyi 2–2 Fergal O'Brien
- Sam Craigie 3–0 Ahmed Aly Elsayed
- Fergal O'Brien 3–0 Ahmed Aly Elsayed
- Fan Zhengyi 2–2 Sam Craigie

==== Table ====
Pos.	Player	P	W	D	L	FW	FL	FD	HB	Pts
1	Sam Craigie (ENG)	3	2	1	0	8	2	+6	117	7
2	Fan Zhengyi (CHN)	3	1	2	0	7	4	+3	110	5
3	Fergal O'Brien (IRL)	3	1	1	1	5	5	0	63	4
4	Ahmed Aly Elsayed (USA)	3	0	0	3	0	9	−9		0

=== Group 24 ===
Group 24 was played on 6 July. Pang Junxu won the group and advanced to Stage 2, Group H.

==== Matches ====
- Pang Junxu 3–0 Stan Moody
- Wu Yize 2–2 Hammad Miah
- Pang Junxu 3–1 Hammad Miah
- Wu Yize 3–1 Stan Moody
- Hammad Miah 2–2 Stan Moody
- Pang Junxu 3–1 Wu Yize

==== Table ====
Pos.	Player	P	W	D	L	FW	FL	FD	HB	Pts
1	Pang Junxu (CHN)	3	3	0	0	9	2	+7	135	9
2	Wu Yize (CHN)	3	1	1	1	6	6	0	93	4
3	Hammad Miah (ENG)	3	0	2	1	5	7	−2	93	2
4	Stan Moody (ENG)	3	0	1	2	3	8	−5	100	1

=== Group 25 ===
Group 25 was played on 8 July. Si Jiahui won the group and advanced to Stage 2, Group H.

==== Matches ====
- Si Jiahui 3–1 Haydon Pinhey
- Mark Joyce 2–2 Mohamed Ibrahim
- Si Jiahui 2–2 Mohamed Ibrahim
- Mark Joyce 3–0 Haydon Pinhey
- Mohamed Ibrahim 2–2 Haydon Pinhey
- Si Jiahui 3–0 Mark Joyce

==== Table ====
Pos.	Player	P	W	D	L	FW	FL	FD	HB	Pts
1	Si Jiahui (CHN)	3	2	1	0	8	3	+5	58	7
2	Mark Joyce (ENG)	3	1	1	1	5	5	0	112	4
3	Mohamed Ibrahim (EGY)	3	0	3	0	6	6	0	54	3
4	Haydon Pinhey (ENG)	3	0	1	2	3	8	−5	67	1

=== Group 26 ===
Group 26 was played on 5 July. Jak Jones won the group and advanced to Stage 2, Group G.

==== Matches ====
- Jak Jones 2–2 Dean Young
- Jamie Jones 3–0 Rebecca Kenna
- Jak Jones 3–0 Rebecca Kenna
- Jamie Jones 2–2 Dean Young
- Rebecca Kenna 2–2 Dean Young
- Jak Jones 3–1 Jamie Jones

==== Table ====
Pos.	Player	P	W	D	L	FW	FL	FD	HB	Pts
1	Jak Jones (WAL)	3	2	1	0	8	3	+5	90	7
2	Jamie Jones (WAL)	3	1	1	1	6	5	+1	109	4
3	Dean Young (SCO)	3	0	3	0	6	6	0	81	3
4	Rebecca Kenna (ENG)	3	0	1	2	2	8	−6	64	1

=== Group 27 ===
Group 27 was played on 30 June. Barry Pinches won the group and advanced to Stage 2, Group F.

==== Matches ====
- Jordan Brown 2–2 Joshua Thomond
- Julien Leclercq 1–3 Barry Pinches
- Jordan Brown 2–2 Barry Pinches
- Julien Leclercq 3–1 Joshua Thomond
- Joshua Thomond 1–3 Barry Pinches
- Jordan Brown 0–3 Julien Leclercq

==== Table ====
Pos.	Player	P	W	D	L	FW	FL	FD	HB	Pts
1	Barry Pinches (ENG)	3	2	1	0	8	4	+4	71	7
2	Julien Leclercq (BEL)	3	2	0	1	7	4	+3	103	6
3	Jordan Brown (NIR)	3	0	2	1	4	7	−3	98	2
4	Joshua Thomond (ENG)	3	0	1	2	4	8	−4	64	1

=== Group 28 ===
Group 28 was played on 4 July. Anthony Hamilton won the group and advanced to Stage 2, Group E.

==== Matches ====
- Anthony Hamilton 3–0 Xing Zihao
- Ben Mertens 2–2 Ryan Thomerson
- Anthony Hamilton 2–2 Ryan Thomerson
- Ben Mertens 2–2 Xing Zihao
- Ryan Thomerson 1–3 Xing Zihao
- Anthony Hamilton 2–2 Ben Mertens

==== Table ====
Pos.	Player	P	W	D	L	FW	FL	FD	HB	Pts
1	Anthony Hamilton (ENG)	3	1	2	0	7	4	+3	115	5
2	Xing Zihao (CHN)	3	1	1	1	5	6	−1	73	4
3	Ben Mertens (BEL)	3	0	3	0	6	6	0	131	3
4	Ryan Thomerson (AUS)	3	0	2	1	5	7	−2	66	2

=== Group 29 ===
Group 29 was played on 29 June. Thepchaiya Un-Nooh won the group and advanced to Stage 2, Group D.

==== Matches ====
- Thepchaiya Un-Nooh 3–0 Florian Nüßle
- Elliot Slessor 3–1 Victor Sarkis
- Thepchaiya Un-Nooh 3–1 Victor Sarkis
- Elliot Slessor 0–3 Florian Nüßle
- Victor Sarkis 0–3 Florian Nüßle
- Thepchaiya Un-Nooh 3–0 Elliot Slessor

==== Table ====
Pos.	Player	P	W	D	L	FW	FL	FD	HB	Pts
1	Thepchaiya Un-Nooh (THA)	3	3	0	0	9	1	+8	140	9
2	Florian Nüßle (AUT)	3	2	0	1	6	3	+3	66	6
3	Elliot Slessor (ENG)	3	1	0	2	3	7	−4	64	3
4	Victor Sarkis (BRA)	3	0	0	3	2	9	−7	103	0

=== Group 30 ===
Group 30 was played on 26 June. Daniel Wells won the group and advanced to Stage 2, Group C.

==== Matches ====
- Graeme Dott 0–3 Andrew Higginson
- David Grace 0–3 Daniel Wells
- Graeme Dott 1–3 Daniel Wells
- David Grace 2–2 Andrew Higginson
- Daniel Wells 3–0 Andrew Higginson
- Graeme Dott 3–1 David Grace

==== Table ====
Pos.	Player	P	W	D	L	FW	FL	FD	HB	Pts
1	Daniel Wells (WAL)	3	3	0	0	9	1	+8	97	9
2	Andrew Higginson (ENG)	3	1	1	1	5	5	0		4
3	Graeme Dott (SCO)	3	1	0	2	4	7	−3	96	3
4	David Grace (ENG)	3	0	1	2	3	8	−5	80	1

=== Group 31 ===
Group 31 was played on 13 July. Cao Yupeng won the group and advanced to Stage 2, Group B.

==== Matches ====
- Cao Yupeng 3–0 Steven Hallworth
- Lyu Haotian 2–2 Ian Burns
- Cao Yupeng 3–0 Ian Burns
- Lyu Haotian 3–0 Steven Hallworth
- Ian Burns 3–1 Steven Hallworth
- Cao Yupeng 3–1 Lyu Haotian

==== Table ====
Pos.	Player	P	W	D	L	FW	FL	FD	HB	Pts
1	Cao Yupeng (CHN)	3	3	0	0	9	1	+8	145	9
2	Lyu Haotian (CHN)	3	1	1	1	6	5	+1	115	4
3	Ian Burns (ENG)	3	1	1	1	5	6	−1	132	4
4	Steven Hallworth (ENG)	3	0	0	3	1	9	−8		0

=== Group 32 ===
Group 32 was played on 3 July. Xiao Guodong won the group and advanced to Stage 2, Group A.

==== Matches ====
- Xiao Guodong 2–2 Rory McLeod
- Martin Gould 2–2 Alexander Ursenbacher
- Xiao Guodong 3–1 Alexander Ursenbacher
- Martin Gould 2–2 Rory McLeod
- Alexander Ursenbacher 3–0 Rory McLeod
- Xiao Guodong 3–0 Martin Gould

==== Table ====
Pos.	Player	P	W	D	L	FW	FL	FD	HB	Pts
1	Xiao Guodong (CHN)	3	2	1	0	8	3	+5	123	7
2	Alexander Ursenbacher (SUI)	3	1	1	1	6	5	+1	104	4
3	Martin Gould (ENG)	3	0	2	1	4	7	−3	84	2 (Note: Martin Gould and Rory McLeod finished Group 32 equal on points and frame difference. Their head-to-head was a draw. Gould took third place in the group over McLeod due to having made a higher break (84) in the group.)
4	Rory McLeod (JAM)	3	0	2	1	4	7	−3		2

== Stage Two ==
Stage Two consisted of eight groups, each containing four players.

=== Order of play ===
Date	Group
17 July	Group E
17 July	Group F
18 July	Group C
18 July	Group H

Date	Group
19 July	Group A
19 July	Group D
20 July	Group B
20 July	Group G

=== Group A ===
Group A was played on 19 July. Xiao Guodong won the group and advanced to Stage 3, Group 1.

==== Matches ====
- Zhou Yuelong 2–2 Michael Holt
- Xiao Guodong 2–2 Ben Woollaston
- Zhou Yuelong 2–2 Ben Woollaston
- Xiao Guodong 2–2 Michael Holt
- Ben Woollaston 0–3 Michael Holt
- Zhou Yuelong 0–3 Xiao Guodong

==== Table ====
Pos.	Player	P	W	D	L	FW	FL	FD	HB	Pts
1	Xiao Guodong (CHN)	3	1	2	0	7	4	+3	109	5 (Note: Xiao Guodong and Michael Holt finished Group A equal on points and frame difference. Their head-to-head was a draw. Xiao topped the group over Holt due to having made a higher break (109) in the group.)
2	Michael Holt (ENG)	3	1	2	0	7	4	+3	91	5
3	Zhou Yuelong (CHN)	3	0	2	1	4	7	−3	113	2 (Note: Zhou Yuelong and Ben Woollaston finished Group A equal on points and frame difference. Their head-to-head was a draw. Zhou took third place in the group over Woolaston due to having made a higher break (113) in the group.)
4	Ben Woollaston (ENG)	3	0	2	1	4	7	−3	88	2

=== Group B ===
Group B was played on 20 July. Cao Yupeng won the group and advanced to Stage 3, Group 2.

==== Matches ====
- Judd Trump 3–1 Matthew Stevens
- Joe Perry 0–3 Cao Yupeng
- Judd Trump 2–2 Cao Yupeng
- Joe Perry 2–2 Matthew Stevens
- Cao Yupeng 2–2 Matthew Stevens
- Judd Trump 2–2 Joe Perry

==== Table ====
Pos.	Player	P	W	D	L	FW	FL	FD	HB	Pts
1	Cao Yupeng (CHN)	3	1	2	0	7	4	+3	141	5
2	Judd Trump (ENG)	3	1	2	0	7	5	+2	119	5
3	Matthew Stevens (WAL)	3	0	2	1	5	7	−2	111	2
4	Joe Perry (ENG)	3	0	2	1	4	7	−3	102	2

=== Group C ===
Group C was played on 18 July. Noppon Saengkham won the group and advanced to Stage 3, Group 2.

==== Matches ====
- Noppon Saengkham 3–0 Liu Hongyu
- Daniel Wells 1–3 Ashley Carty
- Noppon Saengkham 2–2 Daniel Wells
- Ashley Carty 1–3 Liu Hongyu
- Daniel Wells 2–2 Liu Hongyu
- Noppon Saengkham 3–1 Ashley Carty

==== Table ====
Pos.	Player	P	W	D	L	FW	FL	FD	HB	Pts
1	Noppon Saengkham (THA)	3	2	1	0	8	3	+5	123	7
2	Liu Hongyu (CHN)	3	1	1	1	5	6	−1	86	4
3	Ashley Carty (ENG)	3	1	0	2	5	7	−2	72	3
4	Daniel Wells (WAL)	3	0	2	1	5	7	−2	100	2

=== Group D ===
Group D was played on 19 July. Shaun Murphy won the group and advanced to Stage 3, Group 1.

==== Matches ====
- Shaun Murphy 3–1 James Cahill
- David Gilbert 2–2 Thepchaiya Un-Nooh
- Shaun Murphy 3–0 Thepchaiya Un-Nooh
- David Gilbert 3–0 James Cahill
- Thepchaiya Un-Nooh 2–2 James Cahill
- Shaun Murphy 2–2 David Gilbert

==== Table ====
Pos.	Player	P	W	D	L	FW	FL	FD	HB	Pts
1	Shaun Murphy (ENG)	3	2	1	0	8	3	+5	84	7
2	David Gilbert (ENG)	3	1	2	0	7	4	+3	135	5
3	Thepchaiya Un-Nooh (THA)	3	0	2	1	4	7	−3	111	2
4	James Cahill (ENG)	3	0	1	2	3	8	−5		1

=== Group E ===
Group E was played on 17 July. Chris Wakelin won the group and advanced to Stage 3, Group 1.

==== Matches ====
- Kyren Wilson 3–0 Sanderson Lam
- Chris Wakelin 3–0 Anthony Hamilton
- Kyren Wilson 3–0 Anthony Hamilton
- Chris Wakelin 2–2 Sanderson Lam
- Anthony Hamilton 3–0 Sanderson Lam
- Kyren Wilson 1–3 Chris Wakelin

==== Table ====
Pos.	Player	P	W	D	L	FW	FL	FD	HB	Pts
1	Chris Wakelin (ENG)	3	2	1	0	8	3	+5	114	7
2	Kyren Wilson (ENG)	3	2	0	1	7	3	+4	118	6
3	Anthony Hamilton (ENG)	3	1	0	2	3	6	−3	103	3
4	Sanderson Lam (ENG)	3	0	1	2	2	8	−6	63	1

=== Group F ===
Group F was played on 17 July. Mark Williams won the group and advanced to Stage 3, Group 2.

==== Matches ====
- Mark Williams 3–0 Barry Pinches
- Robbie Williams 2–2 Martin O'Donnell
- Mark Williams 3–0 Martin O'Donnell
- Robbie Williams 3–0 Barry Pinches
- Martin O'Donnell 3–1 Barry Pinches
- Mark Williams 3–0 Robbie Williams

==== Table ====
Pos.	Player	P	W	D	L	FW	FL	FD	HB	Pts
1	Mark Williams (WAL)	3	3	0	0	9	0	+9	87	9
2	Robbie Williams (ENG)	3	1	1	1	5	5	0	91	4
3	Martin O'Donnell (ENG)	3	1	1	1	5	6	−1	131	4
4	Barry Pinches (ENG)	3	0	0	3	1	9	−8	90	0

=== Group G ===
Group G was played on 20 July. Sam Craigie won the group and advanced to Stage 3, Group 2.

==== Matches ====
- Jak Jones 2–2 Long Zehuang
- Sam Craigie 3–0 Michael White
- Jak Jones 1–3 Michael White
- Sam Craigie 2–2 Long Zehuang
- Michael White 2–2 Long Zehuang
- Jak Jones 1–3 Sam Craigie

==== Table ====
Pos.	Player	P	W	D	L	FW	FL	FD	HB	Pts
1	Sam Craigie (ENG)	3	2	1	0	8	3	+5	88	7
2	Michael White (WAL)	3	1	1	1	5	6	−1	62	4
3	Long Zehuang (CHN)	3	0	3	0	6	6	0	94	3
4	Jak Jones (WAL)	3	0	1	2	4	8	−4	76	1

=== Group H ===
Group H was played on 18 July. Robert Milkins won the group and advanced to Stage 3, Group 1.

==== Matches ====
- Robert Milkins 3–0 John Astley
- Pang Junxu 1–3 Si Jiahui
- Robert Milkins 2–2 Si Jiahui
- Pang Junxu 2–2 John Astley
- Si Jiahui 1–3 John Astley
- Robert Milkins 2–2 Pang Junxu

==== Table ====
Pos.	Player	P	W	D	L	FW	FL	FD	HB	Pts
1	Robert Milkins (ENG)	3	1	2	0	7	4	+3	89	5
2	Si Jiahui (CHN)	3	1	1	1	6	6	0	104	4
3	John Astley (ENG)	3	1	1	1	5	6	−1	70	4
4	Pang Junxu (CHN)	3	0	2	1	5	7	−2	96	2

== Stage Three ==
Stage Three consisted of two groups, each containing four players.

=== Winners' group 1 ===
Winners' group 1 was played on 21 July. Shaun Murphy won the group and advanced to the final.

==== Winners' group 1 matches ====
- Shaun Murphy 2–2 Xiao Guodong
- Robert Milkins 2–2 Chris Wakelin
- Shaun Murphy 3–1 Chris Wakelin
- Robert Milkins 2–2 Xiao Guodong
- Chris Wakelin 3–1 Xiao Guodong
- Shaun Murphy 2–2 Robert Milkins

==== Winners' group 1 table ====
Pos.	Player	P	W	D	L	FW	FL	FD	HB	Pts
1	Shaun Murphy (ENG)	3	1	2	0	7	5	+2	133	5
2	Chris Wakelin (ENG)	3	1	1	1	6	6	0	103	4
3	Robert Milkins (ENG)	3	0	3	0	6	6	0	96	3
4	Xiao Guodong (CHN)	3	0	2	1	5	7	−2	82	2

=== Winners' group 2 ===
Winners' group 2 was played on 21 July. Mark Williams won the group and advanced to the final.

==== Winners' group 2 matches ====
- Mark Williams 2–2 Sam Craigie
- Noppon Saengkham 3–0 Cao Yupeng
- Mark Williams 3–1 Cao Yupeng
- Noppon Saengkham 2–2 Sam Craigie
- Cao Yupeng 0–3 Sam Craigie
- Mark Williams 3–1 Noppon Saengkham

==== Winners' group 2 table ====
Pos.	Player	P	W	D	L	FW	FL	FD	HB	Pts
1	Mark Williams (WAL)	3	2	1	0	8	4	+4	136	7
2	Sam Craigie (ENG)	3	1	2	0	7	4	+3	69	5
3	Noppon Saengkham (THA)	3	1	1	1	6	5	+1	100	4
4	Cao Yupeng (CHN)	3	0	0	3	1	9	−8		0

== Final ==
Final: Best of 5 frames. Referee: David Ford; Morningside Arena, Leicester, England, 21 July 2023
Shaun Murphy; England	3–0	Mark Williams; Wales
Frame scores: 65–53, 73–0, 69–30
73	Highest break	
0	Century breaks	0

== Century breaks ==
A total of 101 century breaks were made in the tournament.

- 145, 141, 134, 133, 122 – Cao Yupeng
- 140, 132, 111, 105 – Thepchaiya Un-Nooh
- 140, 114 – Ma Hailong
- 140 – Sean McAllister
- 138, 104, 102, 102 – Zhang Anda
- 137 – Robbie Williams
- 136, 128, 121, 119, 101 – Mark Williams
- 135, 123, 113, 101 – David Gilbert
- 135 – Pang Junxu
- 134, 128, 118, 111, 102, 100 – Kyren Wilson
- 134 – Michael Holt
- 133, 133, 110, 106, 100 – Shaun Murphy
- 132, 106 – Yuan Sijun
- 132 – Ian Burns
- 131 – Ben Mertens
- 131 – Gary Wilson
- 131 – Martin O'Donnell
- 129 – Allan Taylor
- 128, 102 – Joe Perry
- 128 – John Astley
- 126 – Oliver Lines
- 124, 101 – Michael White
- 123, 109, 101 – Xiao Guodong
- 123, 100 – Noppon Saengkham
- 120, 119, 109, 109, 103, 102 – Judd Trump
- 120 – Hossein Vafaei
- 117 – Jackson Page
- 117 – Sam Craigie
- 116 – Adam Duffy
- 116 – Muhammad Asif
- 116 – Lukas Kleckers
- 115, 110, 103 – Anthony Hamilton
- 115 – Lyu Haotian
- 114, 103 – Chris Wakelin
- 113, 107, 105 – Zhou Yuelong
- 112, 106, 104 – Matthew Selt
- 112 – Mark Joyce
- 111 – Craig Steadman
- 111 – Peng Yisong
- 111 – Matthew Stevens
- 110, 102, 101 – Fan Zhengyi
- 109 – Jamie Jones
- 108 – Dylan Emery
- 105 – Ken Doherty
- 105 – Stuart Bingham
- 105 – Mark Davis
- 104 – Alexander Ursenbacher
- 104 – Ross Muir
- 104 – Si Jiahui
- 103, 102 – Julien Leclercq
- 103 – Victor Sarkis
- 100 – Stan Moody
- 100 – Daniel Wells
