= 2023 Northern Ireland Open =

Snooker tournament

2023 BetVictor Northern Ireland Open

Tournament information
- Dates: 22–29 October 2023
- Venue: Waterfront Hall
- City: Belfast
- Country: Northern Ireland
- Organisation: World Snooker Tour
- Format: Ranking event
- Total prize fund: £427,000
- Winner's share: £80,000
- Highest break: Joe Perry (ENG) (145)

Final
- Champion: Judd Trump (ENG)
- Runner-up: Chris Wakelin (ENG)
- Score: 9‍–‍3

The 2023 Northern Ireland Open (officially the 2023 BetVictor Northern Ireland Open) was a professional snooker tournament that took place from 22 to 29 October 2023 at the Waterfront Hall in Belfast, Northern Ireland. Organised by the World Snooker Tour (WST), it was the sixth ranking event of the 2023‍–‍24 season (following the 2023 Wuhan Open and preceding the 2023 International Championship), the second of four tournaments in the season's Home Nations Series (following the 2023 English Open and preceding the 2023 Scottish Open and the 2024 Welsh Open), and the fourth of eight tournaments in the season's European Series. Qualifying for the event took place from 17 to 20 October 2023 at the Ponds Forge International Sports Centre in Sheffield, England, although qualifiers featuring the top 16 seeds and two local wildcard players were held over and played at the Waterfront Hall. The winner received the Alex Higgins trophy and £80,000 from a total prize fund of £427,000.

Five players—reigning world champion Luca Brecel, Ali Carter, John Higgins, Mark Selby, and Thepchaiya Un-Nooh—did not enter the tournament, having planned to participate in an exhibition event originally scheduled for October 27 to 29 in Macau, China. The WST threatened the players with disciplinary action, claiming that playing an unsanctioned event in Macau rather than an official tour event in Belfast would breach their players' contracts. Following negotiations, the Macau exhibition event was rescheduled to be played from 22 to 24 December, and the WST granted the players permission to enter it. The players concerned remained absent from the Northern Ireland Open. China's Ding Junhui also did not compete in the event. Ronnie O'Sullivan withdrew for medical reasons and was replaced in the draw by Rory McLeod. In all, six of the top 16 ranked players did not participate in the tournament.

Mark Allen was the defending champion, having defeated Zhou Yuelong 9‍–‍4 in the 2022 final, but he lost 3‍–‍4 to Andres Petrov in the last 64. Judd Trump won the tournament, defeating Chris Wakelin 9‍–‍3 in the final to secure his fourth Northern Ireland Open title, following his previous wins in 2018, 2019, and 2020. It was Trump's 26th ranking title, putting him ahead of Mark Williams in fifth place on the all-time list. Following his back-to-back wins at the 2023 English Open and 2023 Wuhan Open, Trump became the fifth player in snooker history—after Ray Reardon, Steve Davis, Stephen Hendry, and Ding—to win three consecutive ranking tournaments, and the first to do so since Ding in 2013.

The qualifying stage of the tournament in Sheffield produced 24 century breaks, and the main stage in Belfast produced a further 57 centuries. Joe Perry made the tournament's highest break, a 145 in his last-64 match against Michael White.

== Format ==
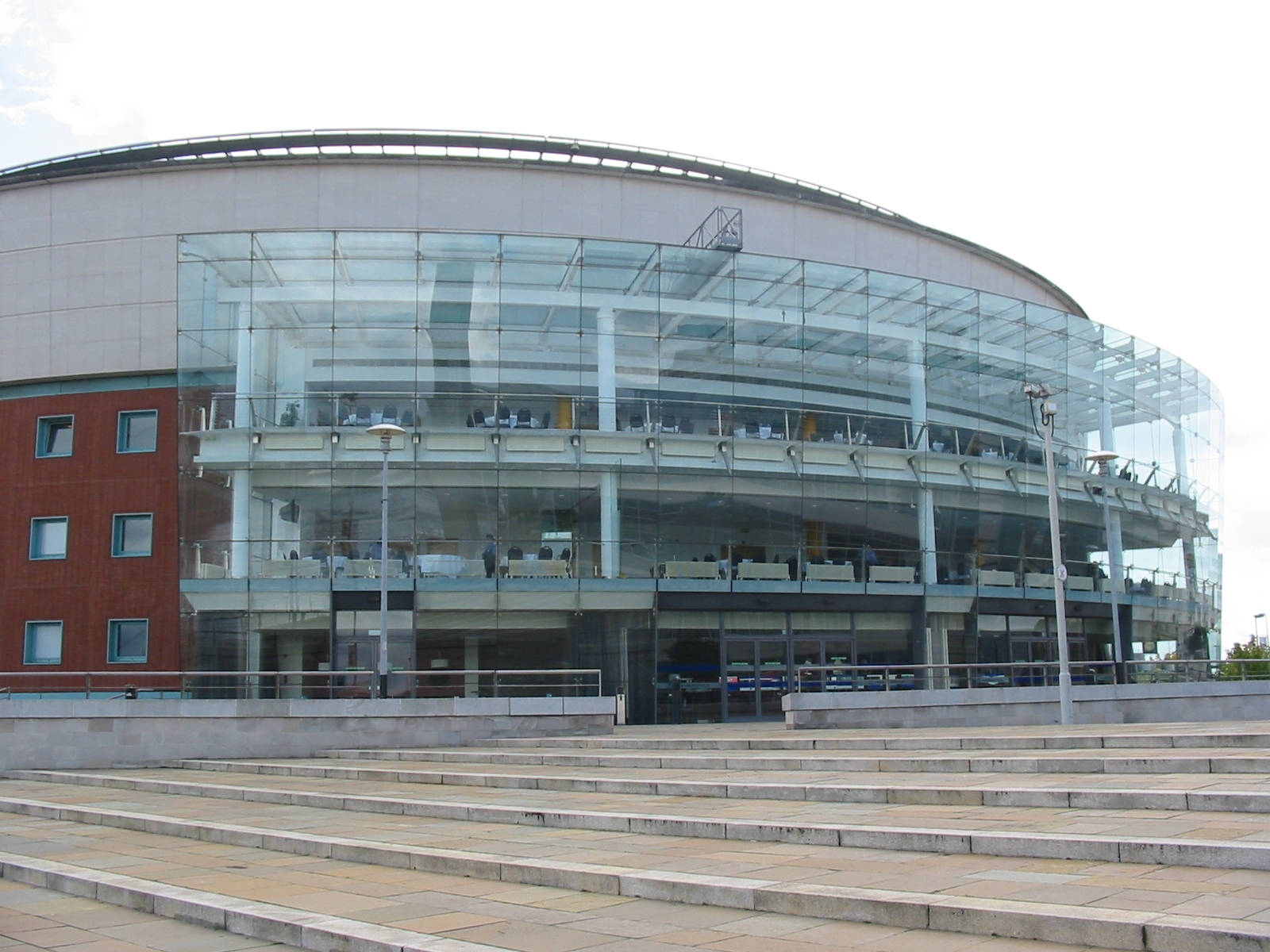
The event took place at the Waterfront Hall in Belfast.

The 2023 event was the eighth consecutive edition of the Northern Ireland Open since it was first played in 2016. The second event in the season's Home Nations Series, the fourth event in the European Series, and the sixth ranking tournament of the 2023‍–‍24 season, it was staged from 22 to 29 October 2023 at the Waterfront Hall in Belfast, Northern Ireland. The event was broadcast in Europe (including the UK and Ireland) by Eurosport, Discovery+, and DMAX. In China, the event was broadcast on Liaoning TV, Migu, Youku, and Huya Live. It was broadcast on Premier Sports in the Philippines; on Now TV in Hong Kong; on True Vision in Thailand; on Astro SuperSport in Malaysia and Brunei, and on Fastsports in Pakistan. In all other territories, the event was streamed by Matchroom Sport.

Qualifying matches were played from 17 to 20 October 2023 at the Ponds Forge International Sports Centre in Sheffield, England, although qualifiers featuring the top 16 seeds were held over to be played at the Waterfront Hall. The Sheffield qualifiers were broadcast in Europe (including the UK) by Discovery+; in China by Migu, Youku, and Huya Live; and streamed in all other territories by Matchroom Sport.

All matches were played as the best of seven frames until the quarter-finals, which were best of nine. The semi-finals were best of 11, and the final was a best-of-17-frame match played over two sessions.

The defending champion was Northern Irish player Mark Allen, who won the title for a second consecutive time by defeating Chinese player Zhou Yuelong 9‍–‍4 in the 2022 final. Allen previously won the 2021 final with a 9‍–‍8 victory over Scotland's John Higgins.

=== Prize fund ===
The total prize fund for the 2023 event was £427,000, of which the winner received £80,000. The breakdown of prize money is shown below:

- Winner: £80,000
- Runner-up: £35,000
- Semi-final: £17,500
- Quarter-final: £11,000
- Last 16: £7,500
- Last 32: £4,500
- Last 64: £3,000
- Highest break: £5,000
- Total: £427,000

== Summary ==
=== Controversy over Macau exhibition event ===
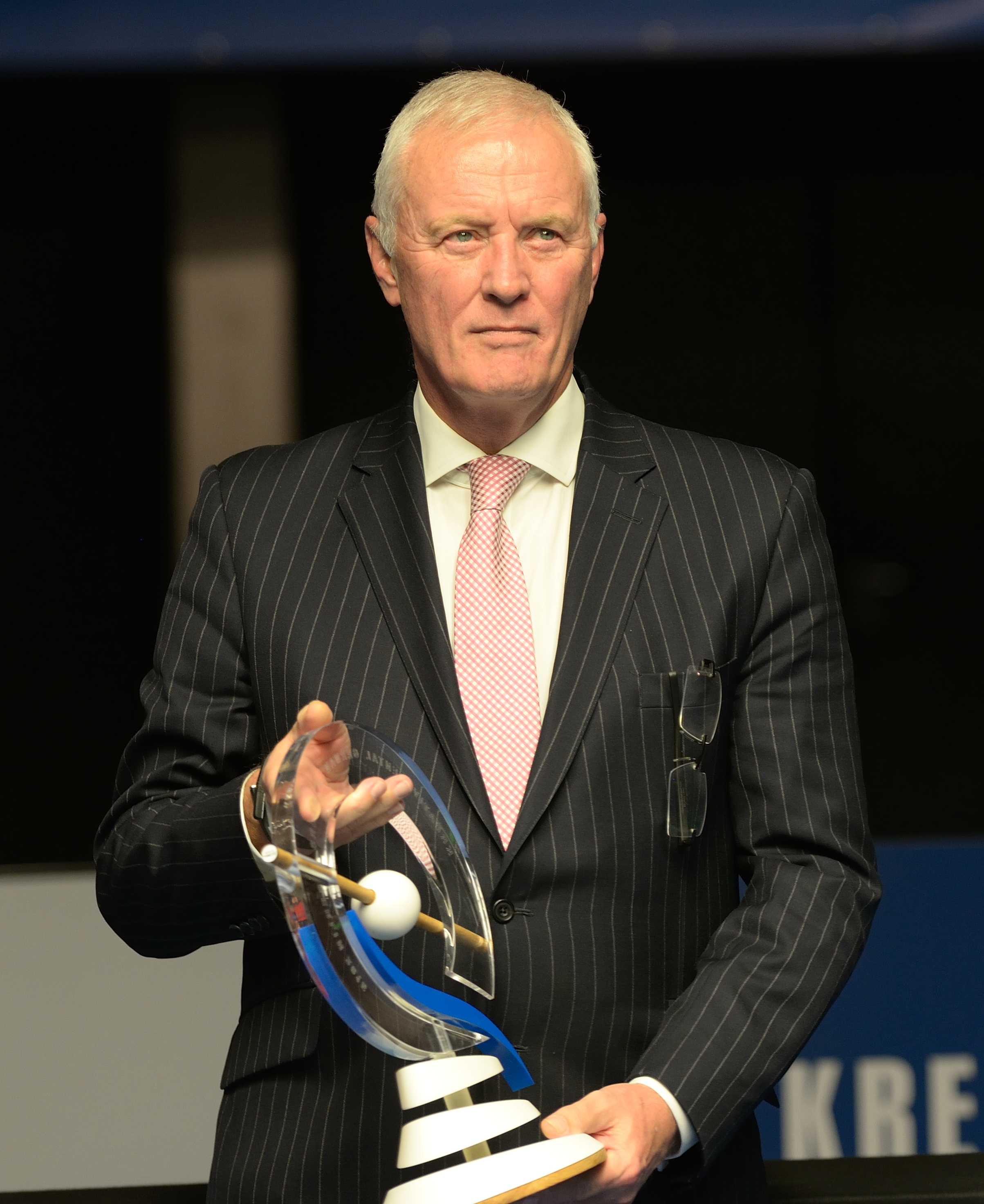
Former WST chairman Barry Hearn (pictured) warned that competing in an overlapping exhibition event in Macau, China, would breach players' contracts.

Five players—reigning world champion Luca Brecel, Ali Carter, John Higgins, Mark Selby, and Thepchaiya Un-Nooh—elected not to enter the Northern Ireland Open because they had planned to play at an exhibition event originally scheduled to take place from 27 to 29 October in Macau, China. The WST threatened to refer the players to the disciplinary committee of the World Professional Billiards and Snooker Association (WPBSA) if they competed in Macau rather than Belfast, claiming that playing in an unsanctioned event that clashed with an official tour event would constitute a breach of their players' contracts. Former WST chairman Barry Hearn warned the players—dubbed the "Macau Five" by some media outlets—that they could be fined, banned, or even expelled from the sport as a consequence. Seven-time world champion Ronnie O'Sullivan supported the players, saying: "This is about players being able to earn what they can, and choose how and when they play." Following negotiations among the WST, the players, and the Macau promoter, the exhibition event was rescheduled for 22 to 24 December. The WST granted players permission to enter and dropped the threat of disciplinary action, stating that "a mutually agreeable solution has been reached". However, the five players did not take part in the Northern Ireland Open, having not entered the event.

The defending champion Mark Allen subsequently commented: "I was offered the opportunity to play in Macau and the only reason I didn't was that it would clash with Belfast. I wouldn't miss Belfast. It means a lot to me and sometimes it's not just about money for me." However, he called the players' contract "very restrictive" and said he was "very strongly in the players' camp" in their dispute with the WST. Allen also claimed that the game was in "disarray", had "gone nowhere in recent years", and said: "I don't think anything will change until the players revolt. We need to boycott collectively. Top players missing an event is the only way it will change." He called the WST's statements about the Macau event "amateurish", adding: "To say they've treated the players with respect is laughable when there have been threats of suing and banning them." Allen later retracted his comments and issued an apology.

=== Scoreboard issues ===
Issues occurred throughout the event with the scoreboards, the on-screen scores on Eurosport and Discovery+, and the World Snooker Tour's live scores website, causing disruption to some matches. During the first-round match between Neil Robertson and Wu Yize, a manual scoreboard was used after the electronic one malfunctioned.

=== Qualifying round ===
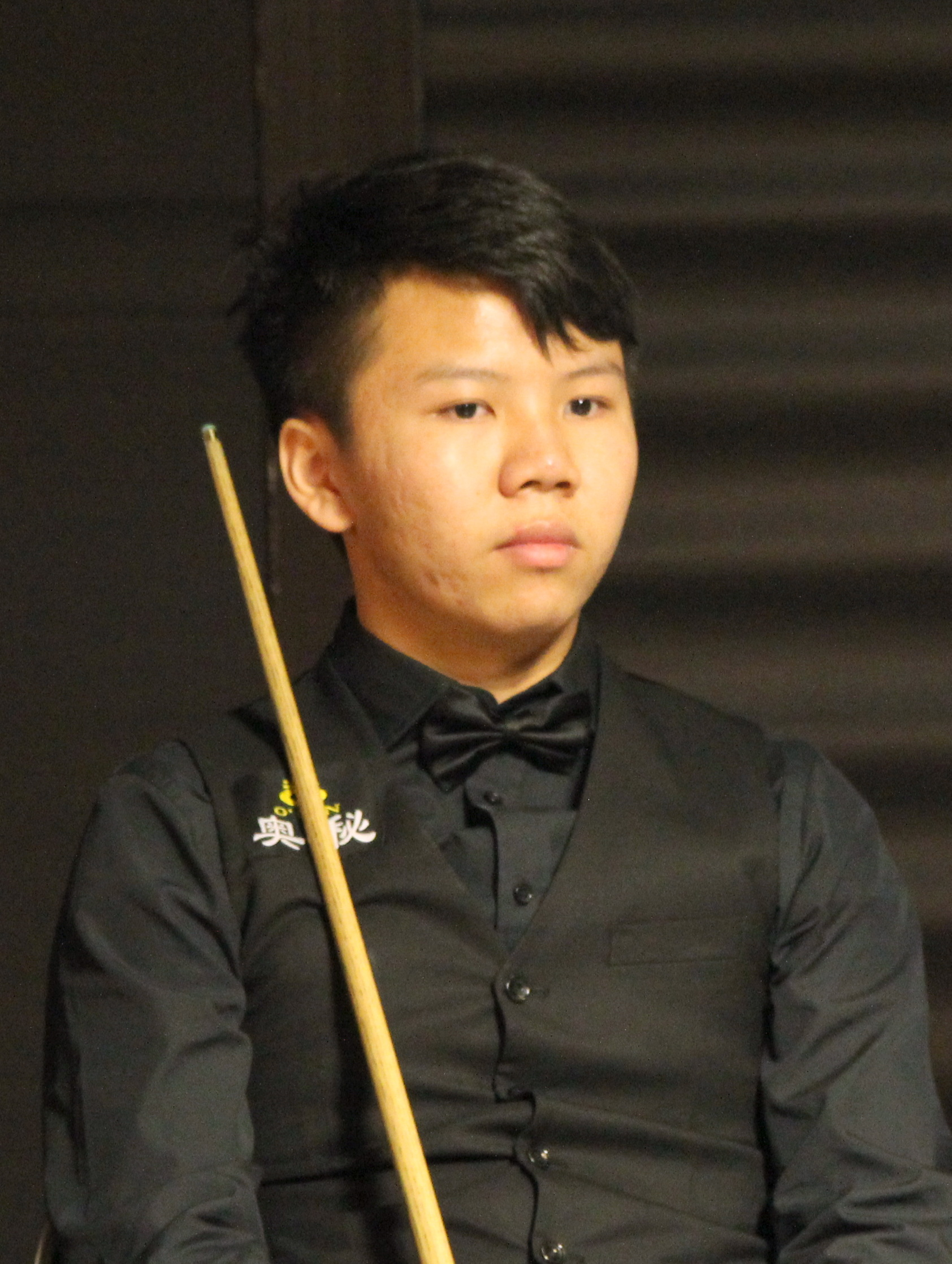
Zhou Yuelong (pictured) made a 144 break, the highest of the qualifying round, but he lost 2‍–‍4 to Stan Moody.

Qualifying for the event took place from 17 to 20 October 2023 at the Ponds Forge International Sports Centre in Sheffield, England. All qualifying matches were the best of seven frames.

Playing his second season on the professional tour, 18-year-old Ukrainian player Anton Kazakov reached the last 64 of a ranking event for the first time with a 4‍–‍1 victory over Long Zehuang. German player Lukas Kleckers recovered from 1‍–‍3 behind to defeat Andrew Pagett 4‍–‍3, making breaks of 84 and 101 in the match. Alfie Burden won the deciding frame on the colours to defeat Egypt's Mostafa Dorgham, while Dominic Dale made centuries of 136 and 101 as he defeated Allan Taylor 4‍–‍1. Dylan Emery came from 0‍–‍2 behind against Martin Gould to clinch a 4‍–‍3 win. Zak Surety secured a 4‍–‍2 victory over 28th seed Joe O'Connor, who made a 129 break in the second frame. Northern Irish player Jordan Brown advanced to the main stage of his home event with a 4‍–‍2 win over Stuart Carrington. The 1997 world champion Ken Doherty made breaks of 135 and 65 as he came from 2‍–‍3 behind against Liam Highfield to secure a 4‍–‍3 victory. Matthew Stevens recovered from 1‍–‍2 behind against seven-time world champion Stephen Hendry to win 4‍–‍2.

After reaching his first ranking quarter-final at the previous week's 2023 Wuhan Open, Irish player Aaron Hill defeated former world seniors champion David Lilley 4‍–‍1. Hong Kong's Marco Fu made breaks of 133 and 104 as he defeated Jamie Jones 4‍–‍2, while the 2006 world champion Graeme Dott whitewashed Oliver Lines 4‍–‍0, and Joe Perry defeated Ishpreet Singh Chadha 4‍–‍2. Stan Moody, who turned 17 the previous month, achieved his first win on the professional tour by defeating the previous year's runner-up, 20th seed Zhou Yuelong. Zhou made a 144 break in the opening frame, but Moody made a century and two half-centuries as he secured a 4‍–‍2 victory. The 2015 world champion Stuart Bingham made a 117 break in his match against Ashley Hugill; Bingham went on to clinch a 4‍–‍3 victory, winning the decider on the final black. Estonian player Andres Petrov made a 112 break in the deciding frame to beat Sanderson Lam 4‍–‍3. From 1‍–‍3 behind, Stephen Maguire made breaks including 126 and 100 to defeat Fergal O'Brien 4‍–‍3. Zhang Anda, runner-up at the English Open earlier that month, defeated 2023 World Championship semi-finalist and 26th seed Si Jiahui 4‍–‍1. The 2022 women's world champion Mink Nutcharut won the first two frames against Michael White, but she then lost four consecutive frames and the match 2‍–‍4.

=== Early rounds ===
==== Held-over qualifying matches ====
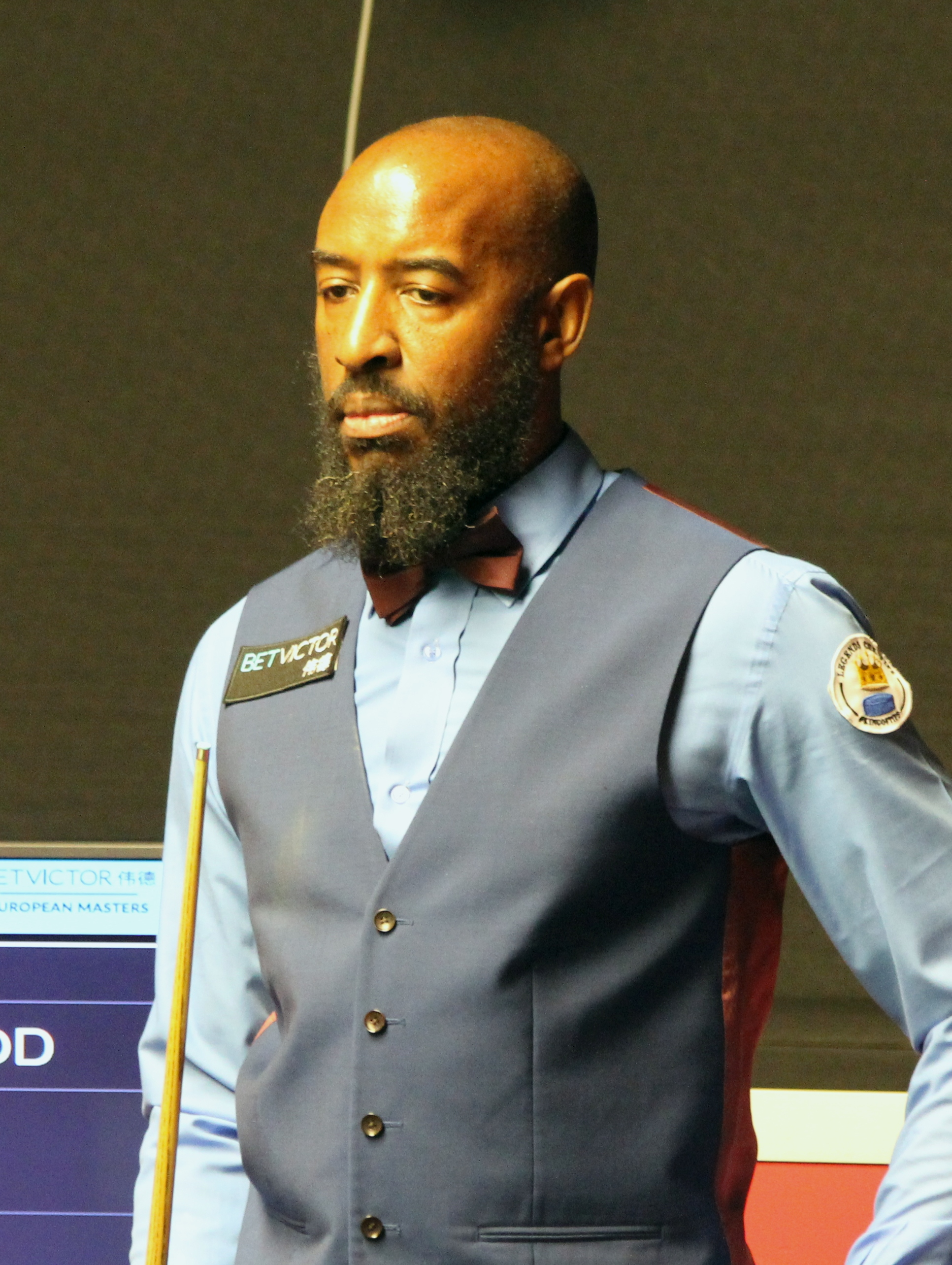
Rory McLeod (pictured) replaced world number one Ronnie O'Sullivan, who withdrew for medical reasons. He lost 0‍–‍4 to David Gilbert in the last 16.

The held-over qualifying matches were played on 22 and 23 October as the best of seven frames. World number one Ronnie O'Sullivan withdrew for medical reasons in advance of the tournament and was replaced in the draw by Rory McLeod. Due to the absence of the "Macau Five", four of whom were top-16 players, plus the absence of O'Sullivan and world number 15 Ding Junhui, only 10 of the top-16 ranked players participated in the tournament, which Allen called "a shame for the Belfast crowd". Neil Robertson, yet to reach the last 32 of a ranking event that season, defeated Wu 4‍–‍1. Judd Trump defeated Jenson Kendrick, and Jack Lisowski defeated Rebecca Kenna, both by 4‍–‍1 scorelines. Northern Irish wildcard Robbie McGuigan, aged 19, defeated Muhammad Asif, also by a 4‍–‍1 scoreline. During the match, referee Alex Crișan mistakenly picked up the cue ball after McGuigan had potted the pink, and attempted to place it on the pink spot. Mark Williams made a 140 total clearance during his 4‍–‍1 win over Tian Pengfei. Cao Yupeng defeated the eighth seed Robert Milkins, Ma Hailong defeated the 12th seed Ryan Day, and Sam Craigie beat the 6th seed Kyren Wilson, all by 4‍–‍3 scorelines. McLeod whitewashed the USA's Ahmed Aly Elsayed 4‍–‍0.

Shaun Murphy brought three cues to the tournament, with respective tip sizes of 9.2 mm, 9.3 mm, and 9.5 mm. He used the cues with 9.2 mm and 9.5 mm tips against Australia's Ryan Thomerson, winning 4‍–‍2. The defending champion and top seed Allen whitewashed Ben Mertens 4‍–‍0, with a highest break of 55, for his 14th consecutive win at the tournament. Allen described his performance as "average" but said "It wasn't about playing well tonight, it was about getting through a potential banana skin, because [Mertens is] a classy opponent". Gary Wilson made breaks of 69, 118, 94, and 50 in his 4‍–‍3 victory over Louis Heathcote. Jimmy White was 1‍–‍3 behind against Anthony McGill but won the fifth frame despite requiring snookers, and also took the sixth to tie the scores at 3‍–‍3. However, McGill, playing with a glove and a black carbon fibre cue, won the deciding frame with an 81 break. David Gilbert defeated Northern Irish wildcard Joel Connolly 4‍–‍1. Hossein Vafaei made breaks of 74, 72, and 112 in his 4‍–‍1 defeat of Mark Joyce. Barry Hawkins made breaks of 64, 123, and 108 as he defeated Elliot Slessor by the same scoreline.

==== Last 64 ====
The round of 64 was played as the best of seven frames from 23 to 25 October. Lisowski lost the opening frame to Jackson Page, but then won four in a row, making a 138 break in frame four, to clinch a 4‍–‍1 victory. Lisowski commented that he shocked himself with a better than expected performance, saying he had not practiced much for the match, was feeling "rusty", and had a cold. Brown won the opening frame against Neil Robertson with a 94 break and went on to take a 3‍–‍0 lead. Robertson won the fourth with a 125 break, but Brown clinched a 4‍–‍1 victory with a 51 break in the fifth. "It's right up there with my best wins, even if [Robertson] has not been in his best form", Brown said afterwards. He dedicated his win to his former coach Joe Bingham on the fifth anniversary of his death. Hill defeated Fan Zhengyi, also by a 4‍–‍1 scoreline.

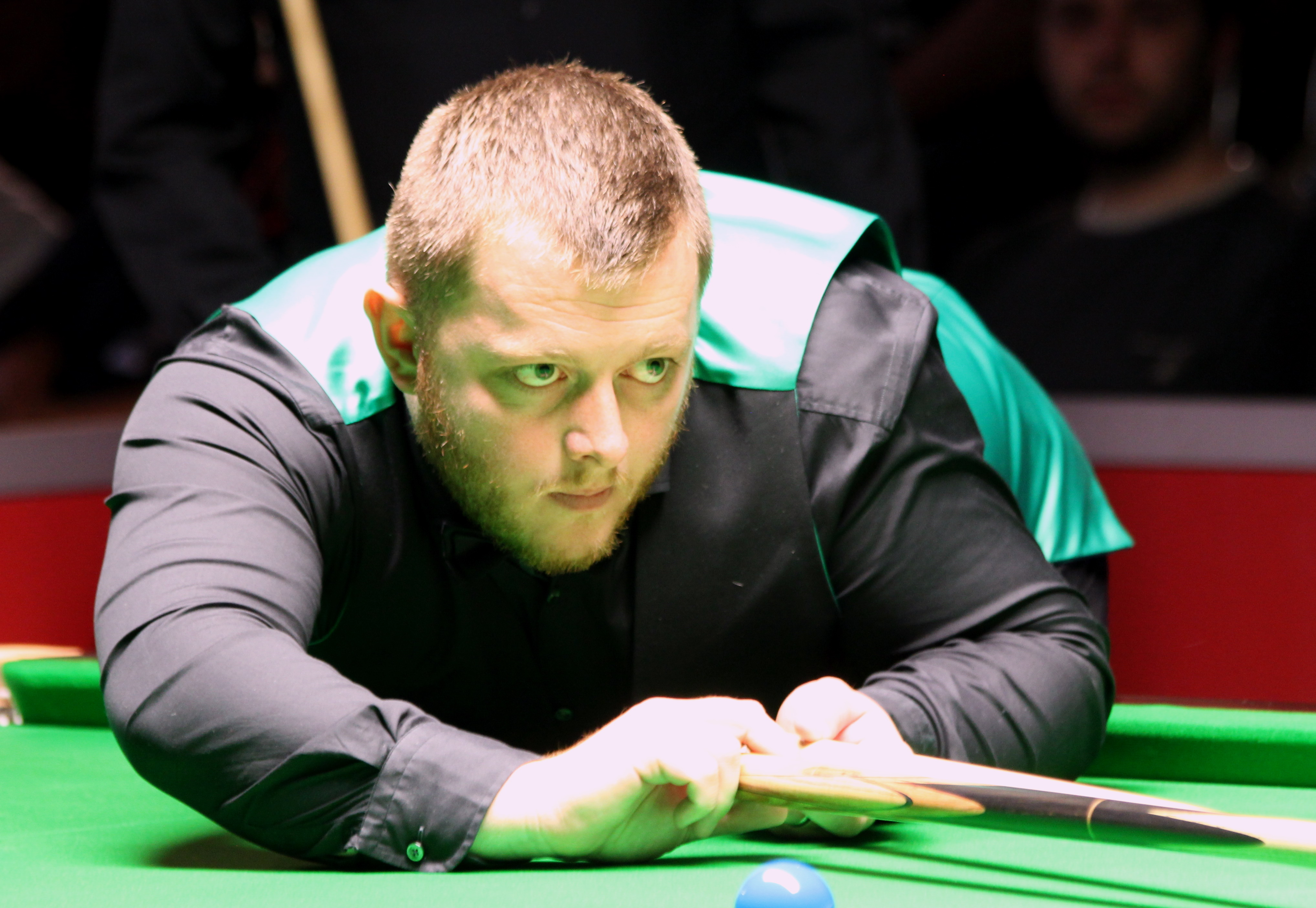
After winning the title for two consecutive years, defending champion Mark Allen (pictured) lost 3‍–‍4 in the last 64 to Andres Petrov.

Moody reached the last 32 of a ranking event for the first time by beating Rod Lawler 4‍–‍1. Moody won the opening frame with a 102 century, won the second from 57 points behind by making a 66 clearance, and took the last two frames on the colours. "I have more confidence and belief now that I have won a couple of matches", Moody said afterwards. "I will just keep playing my game and I know if I do that I can beat anyone". Murphy made breaks of 122, 80, and 117 as he took a 3‍–‍1 lead over Hong Kong's Marco Fu. However, Fu recovered to tie the scores at 3‍–‍3, winning the sixth frame after Murphy called a push shot foul on himself while potting the penultimate red. In the deciding frame, Fu led by 27 points with 27 remaining, but Murphy obtained foul points from a snooker and then made a clearance from the green, winning the match on the final black. Asked afterwards about declaring the push shot, Murphy stated: "I don't think the referee saw it. You couldn't tell that I had fouled, but I knew. We pride ourselves in our game on honesty and it cost me that frame". Matthew Selt made four half-centuries as he defeated Dean Young 4‍–‍3. Gary Wilson defeated Kleckers 4‍–‍1, making breaks of 107, 96, and 86.

Having trailed world number 96 Petrov 0‍–‍2 and 1‍–‍3, defending champion and world number four Allen tied the scores at 3‍–‍3 to force a deciding frame, which came down to the colours. Requiring the blue and pink for victory, Allen missed the blue and Petrov potted the remaining three colours to win the match on the black at 01:45 BST. Petrov, who also reached the last 32 of a ranking event for the first time, commented afterwards: "It's the best win of my career, by far". Posting on X at 03:21 BST, Allen said that he "gave it absolutely everything but came up just short". Hawkins advanced with a 4‍–‍1 win over Jiang Jun in a match that was noted for numerous errors by both players. The opening frame lasted 43 minutes and a stalemate in the third frame led to a re-rack. Jiang made a 105 break in frame four and Hawkins made an 81 to clinch victory in the fifth. Two-time semi-finalist Perry made a 145 total clearance in the third frame of his match against Michael White, equalling the highest break of his career; Perry went on to win the match in a deciding frame.

Ricky Walden played Dale in a match that lasted three hours and eight minutes. Walden made breaks of 83, 68, and 93 to take a 3‍–‍1 lead, but Dale tied the scores at 3‍–‍3 to force a decider. Walden won the match on the final blue. Bingham made a 118 break in his 4‍–‍1 defeat of Xu Si. Trump made two centuries as he whitewashed Julien Leclercq in 45 minutes, extending his winning streak to 15 consecutive matches. McGill trailed 1‍–‍3 against amateur player McGuigan and was 39 points behind in frame four with only the colours remaining. However, McGill obtained three snookers on the yellow to gain the required penalty points, and then won the frame on a re-spotted black. He went on to win the next two frames to clinch a 4‍–‍3 victory. McGill said afterwards: "Robbie still looked composed after that. It's one of those painful defeats for him, but there's no doubt he will get on the tour. I was very impressed by him". McGill attributed his win to his carbon fibre cue. Maguire made breaks of 132 and 85 as he came from 1‍–‍3 behind to beat James Cahill 4‍–‍2. Jak Jones defeated Mark Davis by the same score, making a 143 total clearance during the match, the highest break of his professional career. Robbie Williams defeated Mark Williams 4‍–‍2; the final frame of the match was interrupted by a fire alarm at the venue.

==== Last 32 ====
The round of 32 was played as the best of seven frames on 25 and 26 October. Brown, the last Northern Irish player remaining in the event, lost 2‍–‍4 to Yuan Sijun, who made breaks of 100, 97, and 77. Hill whitewashed Emery while Murphy whitewashed Sean O'Sullivan, missing only one attempted pot in the match. Moody progressed with a 4‍–‍2 win over Gary Wilson while Xing Zihao defeated Petrov 4‍–‍1. Lisowski defeated Selt 4‍–‍1 and commented on a change of technique: "The way I feather the cue ball is a bit different this week, I am trying to give myself more time on the shot". Maguire defeated Craigie 4‍–‍2, while Walden defeated Bingham 4‍–‍1. Trump defeated Ian Burns 4‍–‍2, despite making a highest break in the match of just 36. Perry came from 1‍–‍3 behind to defeat Hossein Vafaei 4‍–‍3, making back-to-back 122 breaks in the sixth and seventh frames. Gilbert made a 127 break as he secured a 4‍–‍1 victory over Lyu Haotian. Hawkins defeated Jimmy Robertson while Robbie Williams defeated Zhang, both by 4‍–‍1 scorelines.

==== Last 16 ====
The round of 16 was played as the best of seven frames on 26 October. Moody led Yuan 2‍–‍1, but Yuan won three consecutive frames for a 4‍–‍2 victory, reaching the sixth ranking quarter-final of his career. Murphy also led Chris Wakelin 2‍–‍1, but changed cues before the fourth frame and scored just two points in the last three frames as Wakelin secured a 4‍–‍2 victory. Wakelin was skeptical of Murphy's multiple cue strategy, commenting: "It's like putting Max Verstappen in Lewis Hamilton's car and expecting it all to fit perfectly and drive the same. A cue is so personal, I don't think swapping halfway through a match is the solution now, though it could be in the future". Walden defeated Xing 4‍–‍1, making a 134 break in the match, to reach his first ranking quarter-final since the 2022 Scottish Open. "It has been a long time coming after a tough season for me", remarked Walden.

Trump trailed Noppon Saengkham 1‍–‍2 but tied the scores with a 124 break. Saengkham made a 109 to regain the lead at 3‍–‍2 and had chances to win the match in the sixth frame, which came down to a lengthy safety battle on the colours. Trump eventually won the frame by doubling the brown to a middle pocket and potting the blue. Trump made a 92 break to win the deciding frame, securing his 17th consecutive professional win. "It's so draining playing this many games", Trump commented, adding: "I go out there hoping the crowd will help and I'm trying to do it for my family who have always supported me". Lisowski made breaks of 116, 60, 61, and 83 as he defeated Hill 4‍–‍1, but predicted afterwards that Hill would "have a big future in the game". Perry trailed Maguire 1‍–‍3 but made a 123 break in the fifth frame and also won the sixth to tie the scores at 3‍–‍3. Perry had a chance to win the decider from 40 points behind, but missed a shot on the black while on a break of 26 that let Maguire clinch a 4‍–‍3 win and reach his first ranking quarter-final since the 2022 World Championship. Gilbert and Hawkins advanced with whitewash victories over McLeod and Robbie Williams respectively.

=== Later rounds ===
==== Quarter-finals ====
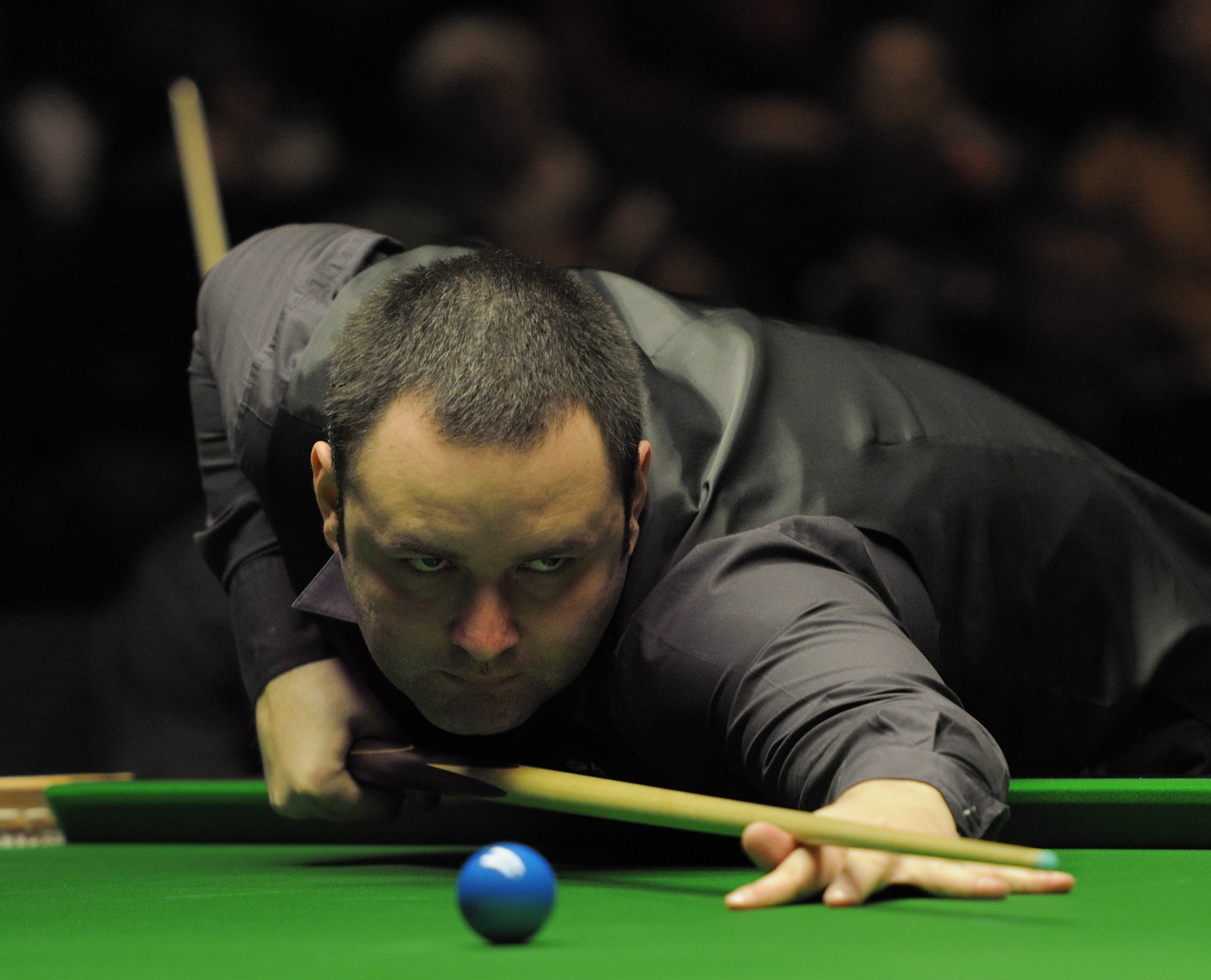
Stephen Maguire (pictured) reached his first ranking quarter-final since the 2022 World Championship, but lost 4‍–‍5 to Judd Trump.

The quarter-finals were played as the best of nine frames on 27 October. Walden had an opportunity to win the opening frame against Lisowski, but missed the penultimate red, allowing Lisowski to take the frame with a 42 clearance. Walden won the second frame with a 132 break, but Lisowski won the third and made a 128 break in the fourth to establish a 3‍–‍1 lead at the mid-session interval. Walden led by 37 points in the fifth frame, but missed the pink to a middle pocket, and Lisowski responded with a frame-winning break of 81. Lisowski made a 73 break in the sixth to clinch a 5‍–‍1 victory, recording a 98 percent pot success rate in the match. He reached the 12th ranking semi-final of his career having lost only one frame in each of his matches to that stage. He commented: "It's unusual for me to win all my matches comfortably because I'm usually quite reckless and open. I am trying to play better safety. I am trying to think more, to do the simple things better, not rush around the table. That goes against my natural tendencies, which feels a bit weird". Hawkins made breaks of 134, 91, and 138 as he took a 3‍–‍1 lead over Gilbert at the mid-session interval. However, Gilbert won three of the next four frames with breaks including 58, 65, and 106, tying the scores at 4‍–‍4. Hawkins made a 57 break in the decider—potting blues and baulk colours from the reds, as pink and black were unavailable—to clinch a 5‍–‍4 victory and reach his 31st ranking semi-final. Calling it a "fantastic match", Hawkins said: "I'm delighted to come through, especially with a good break in the last frame".

Trump, the only top-10 player to reach the quarter-finals, faced Maguire, who won the first frame. Trump won the second with a 78 break, but Maguire won the third with a 74, and won the fourth after a safety battle on the final brown to lead 3‍–‍1 at the mid-session interval. Trump won the next two frames with breaks of 109 and 81 to tie the scores at 3‍–‍3, but made a safety error on the last red in frame seven that allowed Maguire to move 4‍–‍3 ahead. Trump tied the scores again at 4‍–‍4 with a 71 break, and made breaks of 54 and 24 in the deciding frame to clinch a 5‍–‍4 victory, reaching his 57th ranking semi-final. He said after the match: "At 1‍–‍3 down I felt I hadn't done much wrong and I would get my chances. I was never worried. When I got a chance in the decider I really felt I would take it". The match between Wakelin and Yuan was tied at 2‍–‍2 at the mid-session interval. Wakelin then won three consecutive frames to secure a 5‍–‍2 victory. The match produced four half-century breaks, three by Wakelin and one by Yuan. Afterwards Wakelin called the match "scrappy" and said that "trying to get over the line felt like climbing Mount Everest". He added: "I have battled well and I have not shown that in recent years. I've had a tendency to go into my shell and be scared of losing. This week I have battled from the heart. I have put everything into it".

==== Semi-finals ====
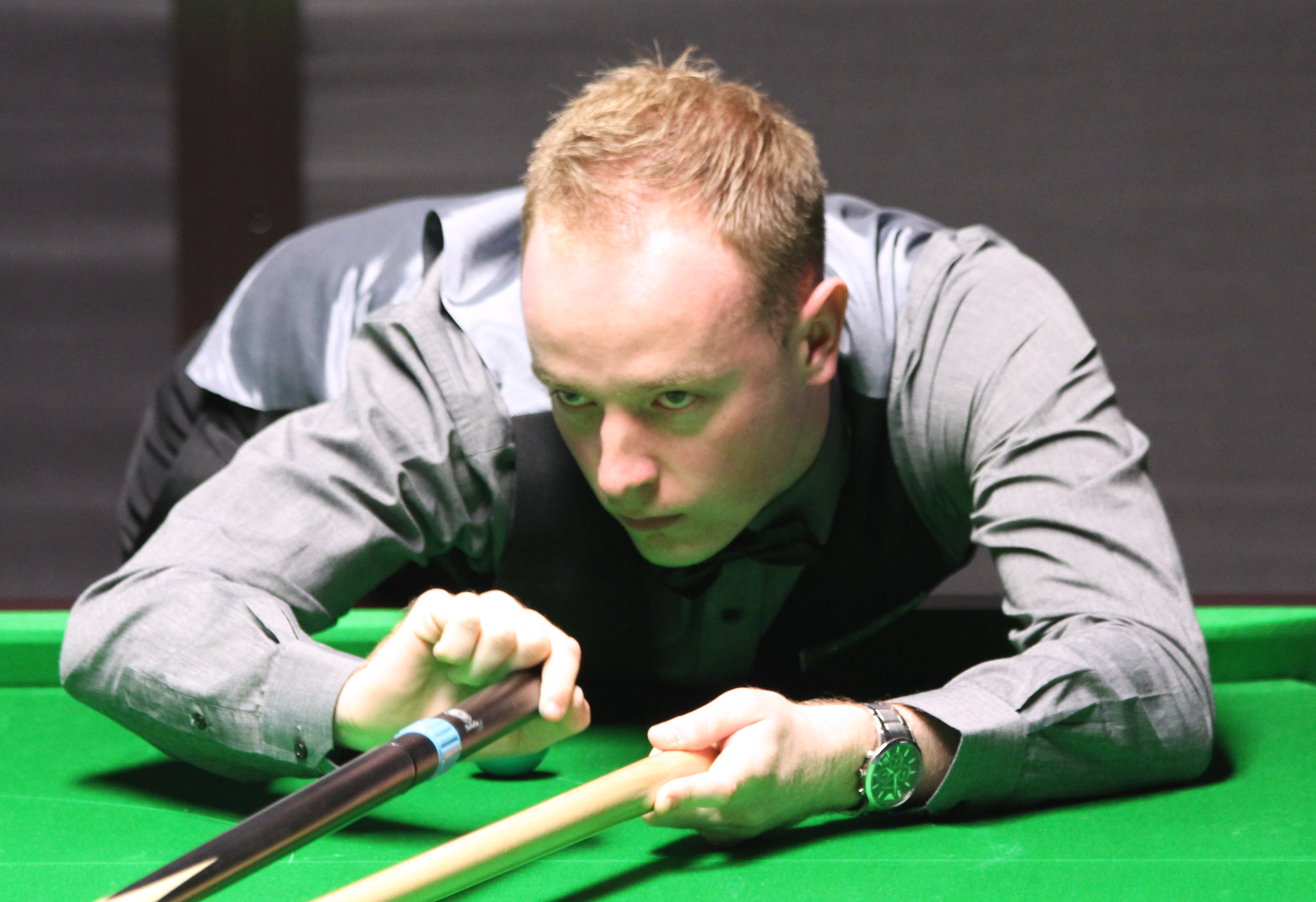
Chris Wakelin (pictured) reached his second ranking final. As runner-up in the tournament, he advanced to a career high of 21st in the world rankings.

The semi-finals were played as the best of 11 frames on 28 October. Wakelin and Lisowski contested the first semi-final in the afternoon session. Wakelin won the opening frame with a 57 break and Lisowski took the second with a 61. Wakelin then won five consecutive frames with breaks including 57, 71, and 66 to clinch a 6‍–‍1 victory. Lisowski, who did not score any points in the last three frames of the match, said: "I felt like I was trying to force it from the start, and my safety wasn't good enough either." Wakelin said: "I was so focussed out there. I genuinely felt like I was going to get over the line comfortably."

In the evening session, Trump faced Hawkins, who had defeated him 9‍–‍6 two months before in the 2023 European Masters final. Hawkins won the first three frames with a highest break of 58, and led 3‍–‍1 at the mid-session interval. Hawkins extended his lead to 4‍–‍1 with a 75 break. However, Trump made two breaks of 70 to close the gap to one frame, and then won the eighth frame to tie the scores at 4‍–‍4. The ninth frame came down to the colours. Trump missed a double on the brown, but Hawkins missed the pink, which allowed Trump to take the lead for the first time at 5‍–‍4. Trump then made a 128 total clearance in frame 10 for a 6‍–‍4 victory, his 19th consecutive win in ranking tournaments. Afterwards, he commented: "When I get on a roll I am able to go a few frames without missing many balls and maybe at the moment that's the difference between me and everyone else."

==== Final ====
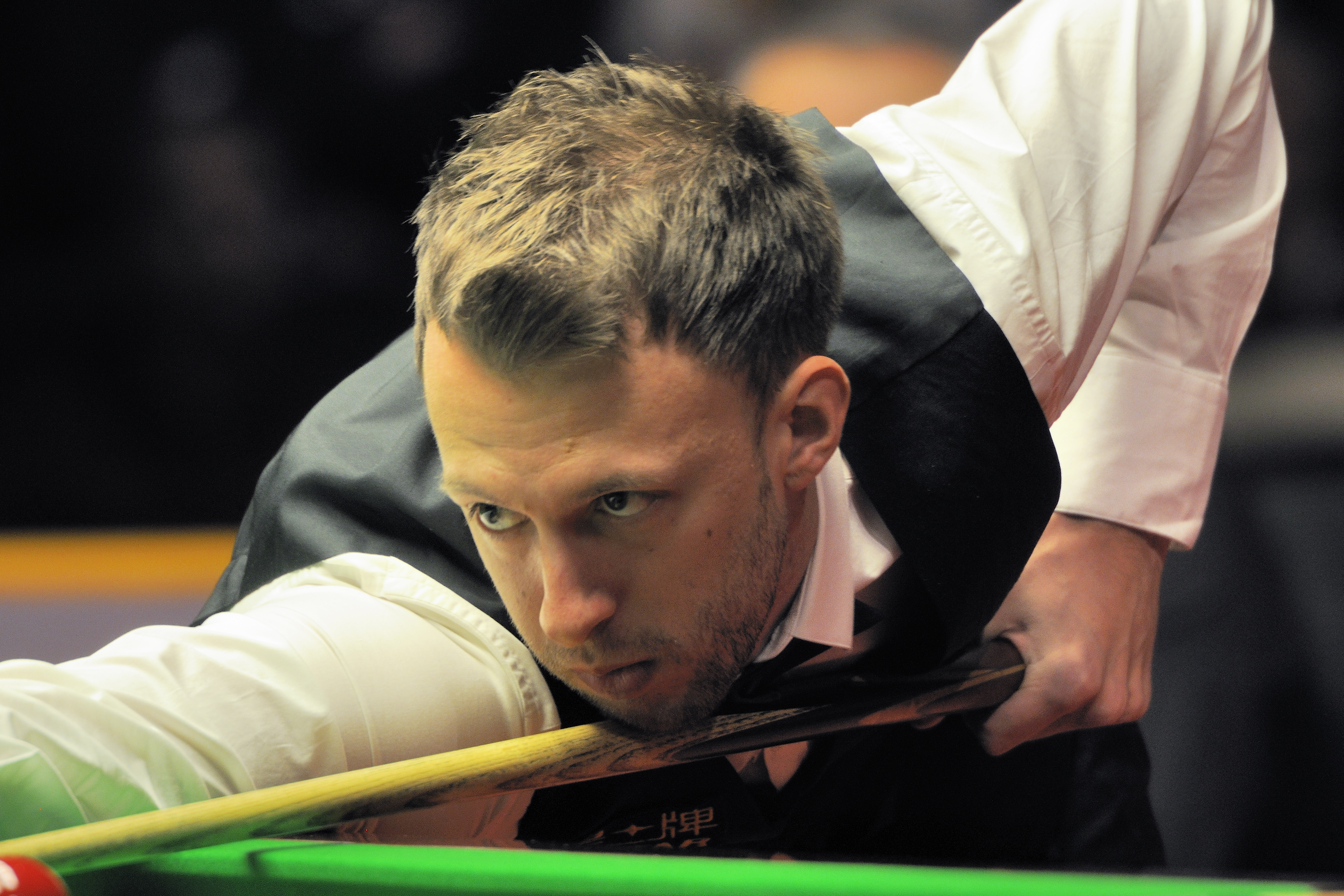
Judd Trump (pictured) contested his 41st ranking final, equalling Steve Davis's total. He defeated Chris Wakelin 9‍–‍3 to become the fifth player to win three consecutive ranking events.

The final was played as the best of 17 frames on 29 October between world number three Trump and world number 25 Wakelin. Trump contested his 41st ranking final, equalling Steve Davis on the all-time list, behind only O'Sullivan with 61 ranking final appearances, Hendry with 57, and John Higgins with 55. Wakelin featured in his second ranking final, following his victory at the 2023 Snooker Shoot Out. Trump had beaten Wakelin in all 11 of their previous professional encounters. Wakelin had a chance to win the opening frame from 55 points behind, but missed the black after potting the last red, and Trump won the frame on the colours. Wakelin took the second frame after Trump made a safety mistake on the yellow, and won the third with an 87 break. Trump won the fourth, tying the scores at 2‍–‍2 at the mid-session interval; he also won frame five and made a 97 break in the sixth for a 4‍–‍2 lead. Although Wakelin made a 53 break in the seventh, Trump won the frame with a 63 clearance; he also took the eighth with a 96 break to finish the afternoon session 6‍–‍2 ahead.

Trump began the evening session by making back-to-back centuries of 101 and 125 for a run of seven consecutive frames in the match, leaving him one from victory at 8‍–‍2. In the next, Trump ran out of position while on a break of 31 and Wakelin countered with a 52 that helped him clinch the frame. In the 12th frame, Trump made the final's highest break of 129 to win 9‍–‍3 and secure his fourth Northern Ireland Open title, following his previous wins in 2018, 2019, and 2020. It was Trump's 26th ranking title, putting him ahead of Williams in fifth place on the all-time list, behind only O'Sullivan, Hendry, John Higgins, and Steve Davis. In all, Trump made three centuries and four other breaks over 50 in the final, his 20th consecutive ranking event victory. After claiming back-to-back ranking titles at the 2023 English Open and the 2023 Wuhan Open, Trump became the fifth player in snooker history—after Ray Reardon, Steve Davis, Hendry, and Ding—to win three consecutive ranking tournaments, a feat last accomplished by Ding in 2013. "Things have happened so fast over the last three weeks. It feels surreal now and it has not sunk in", commented Trump afterwards. "The last session tonight was the best I have felt in the whole 20-match run. I felt really sharp. Once I get in front I can relax, play my best and overpower my opponents... Mentally I have been in a good place when the chances come up." Runner-up Wakelin, who advanced to a career high of 21st in the world rankings after the tournament, said: "This time last year I was in a bad place but the last 12 months have been great for me, on and off the table. To have the privilege to play in this arena tonight was fantastic."

== Main draw ==
The draw for the tournament is shown below. Numbers in parentheses after the players' names denote the top 32 seeded players, whilst players in bold denote match winners.

=== Top half ===
**Last 64**; Best of 7 frames
Mark Allen (NIR) (1)	3
**Andres Petrov (EST)**	**4**
Graeme Dott (SCO) (32)	1
**Xing Zihao (CHN)**	**4**
**Ricky Walden (ENG) (16)**	**4**
Dominic Dale (WAL)	3
**Stuart Bingham (ENG) (17)**	**4**
Xu Si (CHN)	1
Dean Young (SCO)	3
**Matthew Selt (ENG) (24)**	**4**
Jackson Page (WAL)	1
**Jack Lisowski (ENG) (9)**	**4**
**Aaron Hill (IRL)**	**4**
Fan Zhengyi (CHN) (25)	1
**Dylan Emery (WAL)**	**4**
Cao Yupeng (CHN)	3
**Shaun Murphy (ENG) (5)**	**4**
Marco Fu (HKG)	3
Zak Surety (ENG)	3
**Sean O'Sullivan (ENG)**	**4**
Ma Hailong (CHN)	1
**Martin O'Donnell (ENG)**	**4**
**Chris Wakelin (ENG) (21)**	**4**
Alfie Burden (ENG)	2
Rod Lawler (ENG)	1
**Stan Moody (ENG)**	**4**
Lukas Kleckers (GER)	1
**Gary Wilson (ENG) (13)**	**4**
Jamie Clarke (WAL)	0
**Yuan Sijun (CHN)**	**4**
**Jordan Brown (NIR)**	**4**
Neil Robertson (AUS) (4)	1

**Last 32**; Best of 7 frames
Andres Petrov (EST)	1
**Xing Zihao (CHN)**	**4**
**Ricky Walden (ENG) (16)**	**4**
Stuart Bingham (ENG) (17)	1
Matthew Selt (ENG) (24)	1
**Jack Lisowski (ENG) (9)**	**4**
**Aaron Hill (IRL)**	**4**
Dylan Emery (WAL)	0
**Shaun Murphy (ENG) (5)**	**4**
Sean O'Sullivan (ENG)	0
Martin O'Donnell (ENG)	1
**Chris Wakelin (ENG) (21)**	**4**
**Stan Moody (ENG)**	**4**
Gary Wilson (ENG) (13)	2
**Yuan Sijun (CHN)**	**4**
Jordan Brown (NIR)	2

**Last 16**; Best of 7 frames
Xing Zihao (CHN)	1
**Ricky Walden (ENG) (16)**	**4**
**Jack Lisowski (ENG) (9)**	**4**
Aaron Hill (IRL)	1
Shaun Murphy (ENG) (5)	2
**Chris Wakelin (ENG) (21)**	**4**
Stan Moody (ENG)	2
**Yuan Sijun (CHN)**	**4**

**Quarter-finals**; Best of 9 frames
Ricky Walden (ENG) (16)	1
**Jack Lisowski (ENG) (9)**	**5**
**Chris Wakelin (ENG) (21)**	**5**
Yuan Sijun (CHN)	2

**Semi-finals**; Best of 11 frames
Jack Lisowski (ENG) (9)	1
**Chris Wakelin (ENG) (21)**	**6**

=== Bottom half ===
**Last 64**; Best of 7 frames
**Judd Trump (ENG) (3)**	**4**
Julien Leclercq (BEL)	0
**Ian Burns (ENG)**	**4**
Ken Doherty (IRL)	2
**Anthony McGill (SCO) (14)**	**4**
Robbie McGuigan (NIR)	3
**Noppon Saengkham (THA) (19)**	**4**
Barry Pinches (ENG)	1
Michael White (WAL)	3
**Joe Perry (ENG) (22)**	**4**
Anton Kazakov (UKR)	0
**Hossein Vafaei (IRN) (11)**	**4**
James Cahill (ENG)	2
**Stephen Maguire (SCO) (27)**	**4**
Hammad Miah (ENG)	2
**Sam Craigie (ENG)**	**4**
Mark Williams (WAL) (7)	2
**Robbie Williams (ENG)**	**4**
**Zhang Anda (CHN)**	**4**
Rory Thor (MAS)	1
**Barry Hawkins (ENG) (10)**	**4**
Jiang Jun (CHN)	1
**Jimmy Robertson (ENG) (23)**	**4**
Peng Yisong (CHN)	0
Matthew Stevens (WAL)	3
**David Gilbert (ENG) (18)**	**4**
**Lyu Haotian (CHN)**	**4**
Tom Ford (ENG) (15)	3
Mark Davis (ENG)	2
**Jak Jones (WAL) (31)**	**4**
Ross Muir (SCO)	3
**Rory McLeod (JAM) (Note: Ronnie O'Sullivan withdrew and was replaced by Rory McLeod)**	**4**

**Last 32**; Best of 7 frames
**Judd Trump (ENG) (3)**	**4**
Ian Burns (ENG)	2
Anthony McGill (SCO) (14)	0
**Noppon Saengkham (THA) (19)**	**4**
**Joe Perry (ENG) (22)**	**4**
Hossein Vafaei (IRN) (11)	3
**Stephen Maguire (SCO) (27)**	**4**
Sam Craigie (ENG)	2
**Robbie Williams (ENG)**	**4**
Zhang Anda (CHN)	1
**Barry Hawkins (ENG) (10)**	**4**
Jimmy Robertson (ENG) (23)	1
**David Gilbert (ENG) (18)**	**4**
Lyu Haotian (CHN)	1
Jak Jones (WAL) (31)	3
**Rory McLeod (JAM)**	**4**

**Last 16**; Best of 7 frames
**Judd Trump (ENG) (3)**	**4**
Noppon Saengkham (THA) (19)	3
Joe Perry (ENG) (22)	3
**Stephen Maguire (SCO) (27)**	**4**
Robbie Williams (ENG)	0
**Barry Hawkins (ENG) (10)**	**4**
**David Gilbert (ENG) (18)**	**4**
Rory McLeod (JAM)	0

**Quarter-finals**; Best of 9 frames
**Judd Trump (ENG) (3)**	**5**
Stephen Maguire (SCO) (27)	4
**Barry Hawkins (ENG) (10)**	**5**
David Gilbert (ENG) (18)	4

**Semi-finals**; Best of 11 frames
**Judd Trump (ENG) (3)**	**6**
Barry Hawkins (ENG) (10)	4

=== Final ===
Final: Best of 17 frames. Referee: Desislava Bozhilova; Waterfront Hall, Belfast, Northern Ireland, 29 October 2023
Chris Wakelin (21); England	3–**9**	**Judd Trump** (3); England
Afternoon: 43–**75**, **57**–28, **91**–0, 16–**63**, 8–**77**, 0–**97**, 53–**68**, 0–**111**; Evening: 0–**101** (101), 6–**131** (125), **71**–31, 0–**129** (129)
(frame 3) 87	Highest break	**129** (frame 12)
0	Century breaks	**3**

== Qualifying ==
Qualification for the tournament took place from 17 to 20 October 2023 at the Ponds Forge International Sports Centre in Sheffield, England. Numbers in parentheses after the players' names denote the top 32 seeded players, whilst players in bold denote match winners.

=== Belfast ===
Matches featuring the top sixteen seeds and two wildcards from Northern Ireland (Robbie McGuigan and Joel Connolly) were held over to be played in Belfast. The results of the held-over matches were as follows:

==== 22 October ====
- **Neil Robertson** (AUS) (4) **4**–1 Wu Yize (CHN)
- Robert Milkins (ENG) (8) 3–**4** **Cao Yupeng** (CHN)
- Ryan Day (WAL) (12) 3–**4** **Ma Hailong** (CHN)
- **Judd Trump** (ENG) (3) **4**–1 Jenson Kendrick (ENG)
- Kyren Wilson (ENG) (6) 3–**4** **Sam Craigie** (ENG)
- **Ricky Walden** (ENG) (16) **4**–2 Ben Woollaston (ENG)
- **Mark Williams** (WAL) (7) **4**–1 Tian Pengfei (CHN)
- **Jack Lisowski** (ENG) (9) **4**–1 Rebecca Kenna (ENG)
- **Robbie McGuigan** (NIR) **4**–1 Muhammad Asif (PAK)
- **Mark Allen** (NIR) (1) **4**–0 Ben Mertens (BEL)
- **Gary Wilson** (ENG) (13) **4**–3 Louis Heathcote (ENG)
- **David Gilbert** (ENG) (18) **4**–1 Joel Connolly (NIR)
- **Shaun Murphy** (ENG) (5) **4**–2 Ryan Thomerson (AUS)
- **Anthony McGill** (SCO) (14) **4**–3 Jimmy White (ENG)
- **Rory McLeod** (JAM) **4**–0 Ahmed Aly Elsayed (USA)

==== 23 October ====
- **Barry Hawkins** (ENG) (10) **4**–1 Elliot Slessor (ENG)
- **Hossein Vafaei** (IRN) (11) **4**–1 Mark Joyce (ENG)
- **Tom Ford** (ENG) (15) **4**–0 Haydon Pinhey (ENG)

=== Sheffield ===
The results of the qualifying matches played in Sheffield were as follows:

==== 17 October ====
- **Fan Zhengyi** (CHN) (25) **4**–2 Liu Hongyu (CHN)
- Long Zehuang (CHN) 1–**4** **Anton Kazakov** (UKR)
- Andy Hicks (ENG) 2–**4** **Jiang Jun** (CHN)
- Allan Taylor (ENG) 1–**4** **Dominic Dale** (WAL)
- **Alfie Burden** (ENG) **4**–3 Mostafa Dorgham (EGY)
- Reanne Evans (ENG) 0–**4** **Hammad Miah** (ENG)
- Liam Graham (SCO) 0–**4** **Jackson Page** (WAL)
- Andrew Higginson (ENG) 2–**4** **Sean O'Sullivan** (ENG)
- Andrew Pagett (WAL) 3–**4** **Lukas Kleckers** (GER)
- **Dylan Emery** (WAL) **4**–3 Martin Gould (ENG)
- Joe O'Connor (ENG) (28) 2–**4** **Zak Surety** (ENG)
- **Rod Lawler** (ENG) **4**–0 Baipat Siripaporn (THA)

==== 18 October ====
- Mohamed Ibrahim (EGY) 2–**4** **Dean Young** (SCO)
- Scott Donaldson (SCO) 0–**4** **Mark Davis** (ENG)
- Victor Sarkis (BRA) 2–**4** **Ross Muir** (SCO)
- **Jamie Clarke** (WAL) **4**–3 Alfie Davies (WAL)
- Liam Highfield (ENG) 3–**4** **Ken Doherty** (IRL)
- **James Cahill** (ENG) **4**–1 Duane Jones (WAL)
- **Jordan Brown** (NIR) **4**–2 Stuart Carrington (ENG)
- Adam Duffy (ENG) 1–**4** **Julien Leclercq** (BEL)
- Liam Pullen (ENG) 1–**4** **Robbie Williams** (ENG)
- **Chris Wakelin** (ENG) (21) **4**–0 Anthony Hamilton (ENG)
- Manasawin Phetmalaikul (THA) 3–**4** **Barry Pinches** (ENG)
- **Matthew Stevens** (WAL) **4**–2 Stephen Hendry (SCO)

==== 19 October ====
- David Grace (ENG) 0–**4** **Xing Zihao** (CHN)
- **Xu Si** (CHN) **4**–2 Alexander Ursenbacher (SUI)
- Xiao Guodong (CHN) (29) 1–**4** **Yuan Sijun** (CHN)
- **Marco Fu** (HKG) **4**–2 Jamie Jones (WAL)
- Pang Junxu (CHN) (30) 2–**4** **Ian Burns** (ENG)
- **Noppon Saengkham** (THA) (19) **4**–0 Himanshu Jain (IND)
- **Matthew Selt** (ENG) (24) **4**–1 Andy Lee (HKG)
- David Lilley (ENG) 1–**4** **Aaron Hill** (IRL)
- **Jimmy Robertson** (ENG) (23) **4**–2 Sydney Wilson (ENG)
- **Graeme Dott** (SCO) (32) **4**–0 Oliver Lines (ENG)
- **Martin O'Donnell** (ENG) **4**–3 Daniel Wells (WAL)
- **Joe Perry** (ENG) (22) **4**–2 Ishpreet Singh Chadha (IND)

==== 20 October ====
- Zhou Yuelong (CHN) (20) 2–**4** **Stan Moody** (ENG)
- Mink Nutcharut (THA) 2–**4** **Michael White** (WAL)
- **Peng Yisong** (CHN) **4**–1 He Guoqiang (CHN)
- **Stephen Maguire** (SCO) (27) **4**–3 Fergal O'Brien (IRL)
- Si Jiahui (CHN) (26) 1–**4** **Zhang Anda** (CHN)
- **Lyu Haotian** (CHN) **4**–1 Ashley Carty (ENG)
- **Andres Petrov** (EST) **4**–3 Sanderson Lam (ENG)
- **Stuart Bingham** (ENG) (17) **4**–3 Ashley Hugill (ENG)
- John Astley (ENG) 0–**4** **Rory Thor** (MAS)
- **Jak Jones** (WAL) (31) **4**–0 Oliver Brown (ENG)

== Century breaks ==
=== Main stage centuries ===
A total of 57 century breaks were made during the main stage of the tournament in Belfast.

- 145, 123, 122, 122 – Joe Perry
- 143, 110 – Jak Jones
- 143 – Lukas Kleckers
- 140, 120 – Mark Williams
- 138, 134, 123, 108 – Barry Hawkins
- 138, 128, 116, 112 – Jack Lisowski
- 136 – Kyren Wilson
- 134, 132, 102 – Ricky Walden
- 132 – Stephen Maguire
- 131 – Zhang Anda
- 129, 128, 125, 124, 109, 108, 108, 101 – Judd Trump
- 127, 106, 103, 101 – David Gilbert
- 125 – Neil Robertson
- 124 – Sean O'Sullivan
- 122, 117 – Shaun Murphy
- 122, 100, 100 – Yuan Sijun
- 118, 107 – Gary Wilson
- 118 – Stuart Bingham
- 117 – Lyu Haotian
- 112 – Hossein Vafaei
- 111 – Matthew Stevens
- 109, 108 – Noppon Saengkham
- 106 – Michael White
- 105 – Jiang Jun
- 102 – Stan Moody
- 101, 100 – Cao Yupeng
- 100 – Sam Craigie
- 100 – Anthony McGill

=== Qualifying stage centuries ===
A total of 24 century breaks were made during the qualifying stage of the tournament in Sheffield.

- 144 – Zhou Yuelong
- 136, 101 – Dominic Dale
- 135 – Ken Doherty
- 133, 104 – Marco Fu
- 129 – Joe O'Connor
- 126, 100 – Stephen Maguire
- 122 – Xing Zihao
- 117 – Stuart Bingham
- 112 – Andres Petrov
- 110 – Martin Gould
- 108 – Ishpreet Singh Chadha
- 108 – Stan Moody
- 107, 103 – Noppon Saengkham
- 105 – Rod Lawler
- 104 – Liam Highfield
- 102 – Joe Perry
- 101 – Lukas Kleckers
- 100 – Dylan Emery
- 100 – Mark Davis
- 100 – Zhang Anda
