= Andres Petrov =

Estonian snooker player (born 1996)

Personal information
- Nickname: The Tallinn Lamborghini
- Born: 15 October 1996 (age 30) Tallinn, Estonia

Sport
- Country: Estonia
- Sport: Snooker
- Professional: 2022–2024
- Highest ranking: 84 (June 2023)
- Best ranking finish: Last 32 (2023 Northern Ireland Open)

Andres Petrov (born 15 October 1996) is an Estonian former professional snooker player. He is the first professional snooker player from Estonia. Petrov turned professional at the start of the 2022/23 season after winning the EBSA European Snooker Championship.

== Early life and education ==
Petrov was born in Tallinn. His father, Boriss Petrov, is a youth ice hockey coach. Petrov graduated from Tallinn High School of Humanities in 2015 and from Tallinn University, with a degree in youth work in 2018.

== Career ==
Petrov started playing snooker in 2009. In 2017 he reached the final of the EBSA European Snooker Championship for the first time, where he lost 7–3 to Chris Totten, and notably reached the last 64 of the 2019 Riga Masters as an amateur. He turned professional in 2022 after winning the European Snooker Championship with a 5–3 victory over Ben Mertens in the final.

In 2023, Petrov defeated twice-defending and home champion Mark Allen 4‍–‍3 in the last 64 at the 2023 Northern Ireland Open.

== Performance and rankings timeline ==
Tournament	2014/ 15	2015/ 16	2016/ 17	2019/ 20	2022/ 23	2023/ 24	2024/ 25
Ranking (Note: It shows the ranking at the beginning of the season)	(Note: He was an amateur)				(Note: New players on the Main Tour don't have a ranking)	84	
Ranking tournaments
Championship League	Non-Ranking Event				RR	RR	WD
Xi'an Grand Prix	Tournament Not Held						A
Saudi Arabia Masters	Tournament Not Held						A
English Open	Not Held		A	A	1R	LQ	A
British Open	Tournament Not Held				LQ	LQ	A
Wuhan Open	Tournament Not Held					LQ	A
Northern Ireland Open	Not Held		A	A	LQ	2R	A
International Championship	A	A	A	A	NH	LQ	A
UK Championship	A	A	A	A	LQ	LQ	LQ
Shoot Out	Non-Ranking		A	A	1R	1R	A
Scottish Open	Not Held		A	A	LQ	LQ	A
German Masters	A	A	A	A	LQ	LQ	A
Welsh Open	A	A	A	A	LQ	LQ	A
World Open	A	A	A	A	NH	LQ	A
World Grand Prix	NR	DNQ	DNQ	DNQ	DNQ	DNQ	DNQ
Players Championship (Note: The event was called the Players Tour Championship Grand Final (2014/2015–2015/2016))	DNQ	DNQ	DNQ	DNQ	DNQ	DNQ	DNQ
Tour Championship	Not Held			DNQ	DNQ	DNQ	DNQ
World Championship	A	A	LQ	A	LQ	LQ	
Former ranking tournaments
Riga Masters (Note: The event was called the Riga Open (2014/2015–2015/2016))	MR		A	1R	Not Held		
WST Classic	Tournament Not Held				1R	Not Held	
European Masters	Not Held		A	A	LQ	LQ	NH
Former non-ranking tournaments
Six-red World Championship	A	A	A	A	RR	Not Held	

Performance Table Legend
LQ	lost in the qualifying draw	#R	lost in the early rounds of the tournament (WR = Wildcard round, RR = Round robin)	QF	lost in the quarter-finals
SF	lost in the semi-finals	F	lost in the final	W	won the tournament
DNQ	did not qualify for the tournament	A	did not participate in the tournament	WD	withdrew from the tournament

NH / Not Held	means an event was not held.
NR / Non-Ranking Event	means an event is/was no longer a ranking event.
R / Ranking Event	means an event is/was a ranking event.
MR / Minor-Ranking Event	means an event is/was a minor-ranking event.

== Career finals ==
=== Amateur finals: 12 (11 titles) ===
Outcome	No.	Year	Championship	Opponent in the final	Score
Winner	1.	2014	Estonian Amateur Championship	(Estonia) Mihkel Rehepapp	6–1
Winner	2.	2015	Estonian Amateur Championship (2)	(Estonia) Alexander Leitmäe	6–4
Winner	3.	2016	Estonian Amateur Championship (3)	(Estonia) Alexander Leitmäe	6–2
Runner-up	1.	2017	EBSA European Snooker Championship	(Scotland) Chris Totten	3–7
Winner	4.	2017	Estonian Amateur Championship (4)	(Estonia) Alexander Leitmäe	6–0
Winner	5.	2018	Estonian Amateur Championship (5)	(Estonia) Denis Grabe	6–3
Winner	6.	2019	Estonian Amateur Championship (6)	(Estonia) Denis Sokolov	6–0
Winner	7.	2020	Baltic Snooker League - Event 1	(Estonia) Mark Mägi	4–1
Winner	8.	2020	Estonian Amateur Championship (7)	(Estonia) Denis Grabe	6–3
Winner	9.	2021	Estonian Amateur Championship (8)	(Estonia) Mark Mägi	6–1
Winner	10.	2021	European 6-reds Championship	(Poland) Paweł Rogoza	5–0
Winner	11.	2022	EBSA European Snooker Championship	(Belgium) Ben Mertens	5–3
