= European Tour 2014/2015 – Event 1 =

European Tour 2014/2015 Event 1

Tournament information
- Dates: 7–10 August 2014
- Venue: Arena Riga
- City: Riga
- Country: Latvia
- Organisation: World Snooker
- Format: Minor-ranking event
- Total prize fund: €125,000
- Winner's share: €25,000
- Highest break: Marco Fu (HKG) (142)

Final
- Champion: Mark Selby (ENG)
- Runner-up: Mark Allen (NIR)
- Score: 4–3

The European Tour 2014/2015 – Event 1 (also known as the 2014 Kaspersky Lab Riga Open) was a professional minor-ranking snooker tournament that took place between 7–10 August 2014 at the Arena Riga in Riga, Latvia. This was the first professional snooker tournament held in Latvia.

Mark Selby won his 14th professional title by defeating Mark Allen 4–3 in the final.

== Prize fund ==
The breakdown of prize money of the event is shown below:

	Prize fund
Winner	€25,000
Runner-up	€12,000
Semi-finalist	€6,000
Quarter-finalist	€4,000
Last 16	€2,300
Last 32	€1,200
Last 64	€700
Total	€125,000

== Main draw ==
=== Preliminary rounds ===
==== Round 1 ====
Best of 7 frames

(England) Zack Richardson	3–4	(England) Sean O'Sullivan
(Estonia) Andres Petrov	4–0	(Finland) Antti Silvo
(England) Charlie Walters	w/d–w/o	(England) Nico Elton
(England) Mitchell Travis	4–2	(Wales) Jack Bradford
(Latvia) Maris Volajs	0–4	(Wales) Alex Taubman
(England) Martin O'Donnell	4–3	(Finland) Antti Mannila
(England) Richard Beckham	4–3	(Scotland) Marc Davis
(Wales) Ben Jones	4–1	(Finland) Janne Hummastenniemi
(Finland) Sami Hovi	0–4	(Republic of Ireland) Martin McCrudden
(England) Ryan Causton	4–3	(England) Matthew Glasby
(Scotland) Michael Collumb	2–4	(England) Paul Davison
(Germany) Roman Dietzel	4–1	(Lithuania) Vilius Schulte-Ebbert
(Malta) Brian Cini	4–1	(Finland) Joona Koskela
(Republic of Ireland) John Sutton	4–0	(Northern Ireland) Declan Brennan
(Norway) Anita Maflin	0–4	(England) Anthony Jeffers
(Russia) Aleksandr Kurgankov	0–4	(Wales) Jamie Clarke

(Austria) Andreas Ploner	4–3	(Germany) Sascha Lippe
(Netherlands) Manon Melief	w/o–n/s	(England) Craig Barber
(England) Ashley Hugill	4–1	(England) Sydney Wilson
(England) Michael Williams	4–0	(Latvia) Tatjana Vasiljeva
(Finland) Mika Karhu	w/d–w/o	(England) Sam Harvey
(England) John Chapman	2–4	(England) Mark Vincent
(Wales) Duane Jones	4–0	(Netherlands) Kevin Chan
(Latvia) Rodion Judin	0–4	(England) William Lemmons
(Israel) Shachar Ruberg	1–4	(Scotland) Rhys Clark
(Scotland) Dylan Craig	2–4	(England) Jamie O'Neill
(Republic of Ireland) Josh Boileau	4–2	(England) Joe O'Connor
(England) Reanne Evans	4–0	(Scotland) Ross Higgins
(Belgium) Jeff Jacobs	3–4	(England) Sanderson Lam
(Wales) Gareth Allen	2–4	(England) Christopher Keogan
(Wales) Kishan Hirani	4–0	(Latvia) Janis Bindze

==== Round 2 ====
Best of 7 frames

(England) Gary Steele	0–4	(England) Sean O'Sullivan
(England) Jeff Cundy	2–4	(Estonia) Andres Petrov
(England) Ashley Carty	2–4	(England) Nico Elton
(England) Joe Steele	0–4	(England) Mitchell Travis
(Wales) Alex Taubman	1–4	(England) Martin O'Donnell
(England) Kobi Mates	0–4	(England) Richard Beckham
(Wales) Andrew Rogers	4–2	(Wales) Ben Jones
(Belgium) Jurian Heusdens	0–4	(Republic of Ireland) Martin McCrudden
(Sweden) Ron Florax	1–4	(England) Ryan Causton
(England) Paul Davison	4–1	(Germany) Roman Dietzel
(Belgium) Hans Blanckaert	0–4	(Malta) Brian Cini
(Ukraine) Oleksandr Zakharov	0–4	(Republic of Ireland) John Sutton
(Belgium) Tomasz Skalski	3–4	(England) Anthony Jeffers
(Scotland) Eden Sharav	4–2	(Wales) Jamie Clarke

(Finland) Mika Hummelin	0–4	(Austria) Andreas Ploner
(England) Jake Nicholson	4–0	(Netherlands) Manon Melief
(England) Adam Duffy	4–1	(England) Ashley Hugill
(England) Oliver Brown	1–4	(England) Michael Williams
(Republic of Ireland) Thomas Dowling	4–2	(England) Sam Harvey
(Ukraine) Sergiy Isayenko	4–3	(England) Mark Vincent
(Scotland) Mark Owens	2–4	(Wales) Duane Jones
(Lithuania) Sergej Korolkov	0–4	(England) William Lemmons
(Finland) Arttu Klemetti	1–4	(Scotland) Rhys Clark
(Northern Ireland) Billy Brown	4–1	(England) Jamie O'Neill
(Belgium) Kristof Vermeiren	0–4	(Republic of Ireland) Josh Boileau
(Finland) Tero Nappari	3–4	(England) Reanne Evans
(England) Sanderson Lam	4–3	(England) Christopher Keogan
(Finland) Jani Kananen	1–4	(Wales) Kishan Hirani

=== Main rounds ===
==== Top half ====
===== Section 1 =====
Last 128; Best of 7 frames
(Australia) Neil Robertson	4
(Scotland) Ross Muir	3
(England) Dave Harold	w/d
(Wales) Jak Jones	w/o
(Scotland) Jamie Burnett	1
(England) Sean O'Sullivan	4
(England) Mark Joyce	4
(Estonia) Andres Petrov	0
(England) Michael Holt	4
(Australia) Vinnie Calabrese	1
(Scotland) Marcus Campbell	0
(England) Michael Wasley	4
(Belgium) Luca Brecel	4
(England) Nico Elton	1
(England) Mark Davis	4
(England) Mitchell Travis	1

Last 64; Best of 7 frames
(Australia) Neil Robertson	3
(Wales) Jak Jones	4
(England) Sean O'Sullivan	4
(England) Mark Joyce	3
(England) Michael Holt	4
(England) Michael Wasley	2
(Belgium) Luca Brecel	0
(England) Mark Davis	4

Last 32; Best of 7 frames
(Wales) Jak Jones	3
(England) Sean O'Sullivan	4
(England) Michael Holt	3
(England) Mark Davis	4

Last 16; Best of 7 frames
(England) Sean O'Sullivan	4
(England) Mark Davis	2

===== Section 2 =====
Last 128; Best of 7 frames
(England) Joe Perry	2
(England) Chris Melling	4
(England) Alex Davies	3
(England) Ian Glover	4
(England) Alfie Burden	2
(England) Martin O'Donnell	4
(Wales) Mark Williams	4
(Scotland) Scott Donaldson	1
(England) Ben Woollaston	4
(England) Richard Beckham	0
(England) Rory McLeod	4
(Wales) Andrew Rogers	0
(England) Anthony Hamilton	4
(Republic of Ireland) Martin McCrudden	0
(Northern Ireland) Mark Allen	4
(England) Ryan Causton	0

Last 64; Best of 7 frames
(England) Chris Melling	1
(England) Ian Glover	4
(England) Martin O'Donnell	1
(Wales) Mark Williams	4
(England) Ben Woollaston	4
(England) Rory McLeod	1
(England) Anthony Hamilton	1
(Northern Ireland) Mark Allen	4

Last 32; Best of 7 frames
(England) Ian Glover	1
(Wales) Mark Williams	4
(England) Ben Woollaston	3
(Northern Ireland) Mark Allen	4

Last 16; Best of 7 frames
(Wales) Mark Williams	1
(Northern Ireland) Mark Allen	4

===== Section 3 =====
Last 128; Best of 7 frames
(England) Shaun Murphy	4
(England) Chris Norbury	1
(England) Matthew Selt	4
(England) Zak Surety	0
(Northern Ireland) Gerard Greene	4
(Switzerland) Alexander Ursenbacher	3
(England) Jack Lisowski	3
(England) Paul Davison	4
(Republic of Ireland) Fergal O'Brien	4
(Scotland) Michael Leslie	3
(Scotland) Anthony McGill	4
(Malta) Brian Cini	0
(Wales) Jamie Jones	4
(England) Oliver Lines	2
(Scotland) Graeme Dott	4
(Scotland) Fraser Patrick	0

Last 64; Best of 7 frames
(England) Shaun Murphy	3
(England) Matthew Selt	4
(Northern Ireland) Gerard Greene	1
(England) Paul Davison	4
(Republic of Ireland) Fergal O'Brien	3
(Scotland) Anthony McGill	4
(Wales) Jamie Jones	0
(Scotland) Graeme Dott	4

Last 32; Best of 7 frames
(England) Matthew Selt	4
(England) Paul Davison	2
(Scotland) Anthony McGill	4
(Scotland) Graeme Dott	3

Last 16; Best of 7 frames
(England) Matthew Selt	2
(Scotland) Anthony McGill	4

===== Section 4 =====
Last 128; Best of 7 frames
(England) Ricky Walden	4
(England) Ryan Clark	0
(England) Stuart Carrington	w/d
(Republic of Ireland) John Sutton	w/o
(England) Chris Wakelin	4
(England) Steven Hallworth	2
(Wales) Dominic Dale	4
(England) Joel Walker	1
(England) David Gilbert	4
(England) Anthony Jeffers	1
(England) Nigel Bond	4
(Scotland) Eden Sharav	0
(England) Peter Lines	2
(England) Sam Baird	4
(England) Judd Trump	4
(England) Lee Page	1

Last 64; Best of 7 frames
(England) Ricky Walden	4
(Republic of Ireland) John Sutton	0
(England) Chris Wakelin	4
(Wales) Dominic Dale	0
(England) David Gilbert	2
(England) Nigel Bond	4
(England) Sam Baird	3
(England) Judd Trump	4

Last 32; Best of 7 frames
(England) Ricky Walden	1
(England) Chris Wakelin	4
(England) Nigel Bond	1
(England) Judd Trump	4

Last 16; Best of 7 frames
(England) Chris Wakelin	1
(England) Judd Trump	4

==== Bottom half ====
===== Section 5 =====
Last 128; Best of 7 frames
(England) Barry Hawkins	4
(England) David Grace	2
(Finland) Robin Hull	2
(Austria) Andreas Ploner	4
(England) Kyren Wilson	4
(England) Jake Nicholson	2
(Norway) Kurt Maflin	4
(England) Adam Duffy	3
(Scotland) Alan McManus	4
(England) Barry Pinches	2
(England) John Astley	3
(Malta) Tony Drago	4
(Thailand) Noppon Saengkham	4
(England) Craig Steadman	2
(Scotland) Stephen Maguire	4
(England) Michael Williams	2

Last 64; Best of 7 frames
(England) Barry Hawkins	4
(Austria) Andreas Ploner	0
(England) Kyren Wilson	4
(Norway) Kurt Maflin	2
(Scotland) Alan McManus	4
(Malta) Tony Drago	0
(Thailand) Noppon Saengkham	4
(Scotland) Stephen Maguire	3

Last 32; Best of 7 frames
(England) Barry Hawkins	4
(England) Kyren Wilson	0
(Scotland) Alan McManus	4
(Thailand) Noppon Saengkham	1

Last 16; Best of 7 frames
(England) Barry Hawkins	4
(Scotland) Alan McManus	3

===== Section 6 =====
Last 128; Best of 7 frames
(England) Robert Milkins	4
(Wales) Lee Walker	1
(Republic of Ireland) David Morris	w/d
(England) Steve Davis	w/o
(England) Rod Lawler	2
(England) Allan Taylor	4
(England) Mark King	4
(Republic of Ireland) Thomas Dowling	0
(England) Andrew Higginson	4
(England) Elliot Slessor	0
(Northern Ireland) Joe Swail	4
(Ukraine) Sergiy Isayenko	1
(Thailand) Thepchaiya Un-Nooh	4
(Wales) Duane Jones	2
(Hong Kong) Marco Fu	4
(England) William Lemmons	0

Last 64; Best of 7 frames
(England) Robert Milkins	4
(England) Steve Davis	1
(England) Allan Taylor	2
(England) Mark King	4
(England) Andrew Higginson	2
(Northern Ireland) Joe Swail	4
(Thailand) Thepchaiya Un-Nooh	3
(Hong Kong) Marco Fu	4

Last 32; Best of 7 frames
(England) Robert Milkins	4
(England) Mark King	3
(Northern Ireland) Joe Swail	3
(Hong Kong) Marco Fu	4

Last 16; Best of 7 frames
(England) Robert Milkins	3
(Hong Kong) Marco Fu	4

===== Section 7 =====
Last 128; Best of 7 frames
(Scotland) John Higgins	4
(Scotland) Rhys Clark	0
(England) Gary Wilson	4
(England) Mitchell Mann	3
(England) Robbie Williams	4
(England) Michael Georgiou	3
(England) Peter Ebdon	4
(Wales) Andrew Pagett	0
(Wales) Ryan Day	4
(Northern Ireland) Billy Brown	0
(Thailand) Dechawat Poomjaeng	4
(Qatar) Ahmed Saif	0
(England) Jimmy White	4
(Thailand) Ratchayothin Yotharuck	1
(England) Stuart Bingham	4
(England) Hammad Miah	1

Last 64; Best of 7 frames
(Scotland) John Higgins	4
(England) Gary Wilson	2
(England) Robbie Williams	1
(England) Peter Ebdon	4
(Wales) Ryan Day	4
(Thailand) Dechawat Poomjaeng	1
(England) Jimmy White	3
(England) Stuart Bingham	4

Last 32; Best of 7 frames
(Scotland) John Higgins	2
(England) Peter Ebdon	4
(Wales) Ryan Day	0
(England) Stuart Bingham	4

Last 16; Best of 7 frames
(England) Peter Ebdon	4
(England) Stuart Bingham	3

===== Section 8 =====
Last 128; Best of 7 frames
(Wales) Matthew Stevens	0
(England) Liam Highfield	4
(India) Aditya Mehta	4
(Republic of Ireland) Josh Boileau	0
(England) Jamie Cope	4
(England) Reanne Evans	2
(Wales) Michael White	4
(England) Sanderson Lam	2
(England) Martin Gould	3
(England) James Cahill	4
(England) Jimmy Robertson	4
(Malta) Alex Borg	1
(England) Mike Dunn	4
(Wales) Kishan Hirani	0
(England) Mark Selby	4
(England) Ian Burns	1

Last 64; Best of 7 frames
(England) Liam Highfield	0
(India) Aditya Mehta	4
(England) Jamie Cope	0
(Wales) Michael White	4
(England) James Cahill	3
(England) Jimmy Robertson	4
(England) Mike Dunn	3
(England) Mark Selby	4

Last 32; Best of 7 frames
(India) Aditya Mehta	4
(Wales) Michael White	2
(England) Jimmy Robertson	2
(England) Mark Selby	4

Last 16; Best of 7 frames
(India) Aditya Mehta	2
(England) Mark Selby	4

==== Finals ====
Quarter-finals; Best of 7 frames		Semi-finals; Best of 7 frames		Final; Best of 7 frames
(England) Sean O'Sullivan	0
(Northern Ireland) Mark Allen	4	(Northern Ireland) Mark Allen	4
(Scotland) Anthony McGill	4	(Scotland) Anthony McGill	3
(England) Judd Trump	3			(Northern Ireland) Mark Allen	3
(England) Barry Hawkins	4			(England) Mark Selby	4
(Hong Kong) Marco Fu	3	(England) Barry Hawkins	0
(England) Peter Ebdon	2	(England) Mark Selby	4
(England) Mark Selby	4

== Century breaks ==
- 142, 130, 117 – Marco Fu
- 137, 131, 108 – Judd Trump
- 137 – Ben Woollaston
- 134 – Stephen Maguire
- 134 – James Cahill
- 131, 102, 102, 100 – Mark Selby
- 131 – Neil Robertson
- 130, 120, 112 – Alan McManus
- 129, 117 – Noppon Saengkham
- 125 – Gary Wilson
- 122, 120, 101 – Sam Baird
- 122, 101 – Mark Davis
- 114, 106 – Ian Glover
- 114 – Mark Allen
- 112 – Shaun Murphy
- 111, 101 – Jimmy Robertson
- 107 – Michael White
- 102 – Peter Ebdon
- 100 – David Gilbert
- 100 – Jimmy White
