= 2016 Riga Masters =

Snooker tournament

Riga Masters
Tournament information
- Dates: 22–24 June 2016
- Venue: Arena Riga
- City: Riga
- Country: Latvia
- Organisation: World Snooker
- Format: Ranking event
- Total prize fund: €200,000
- Winner's share: €50,000
- Highest break: Martin O'Donnell (ENG) (138)

Final
- Champion: Neil Robertson (AUS)
- Runner-up: Michael Holt (ENG)
- Score: 5–2

The 2016 Kaspersky Riga Masters was a professional ranking snooker tournament that took place between 22 and 24 June 2016 at the Arena Riga in Riga, Latvia. It was the first ranking event of the 2016/2017 season.

This was the first time for which the event was a ranking tournament, having previously been a minor-ranking event of the Players Tour Championship.

Barry Hawkins was the defending champion, but he decided not to defend his title.

Neil Robertson won the 12th ranking title of his career, defeating Michael Holt 5–2 in the final, from trailing 1–2.

== Prize fund ==
The breakdown of prize money for this year is shown below:

- Winner: €50,000
- Runner-up: €25,000
- Semi-final: €15,000
- Quarter-final: €6,000
- Last 16: €3,000
- Last 32: €1,400
- Last 64: €700
- Non-televised highest break: €200
- Televised highest break: €2,000
- Total: €200,000

The "rolling 147 prize" for a maximum break stood at £25,000.

== Main draw ==
Last 64; Best of 7 frames
(England) Sean O'Sullivan	4
(Belgium) Luca Brecel	0
(England) David Gilbert	4
(England) Sam Baird	1
(Wales) Jamie Jones	4
(England) Gary Wilson	3
(Wales) Gareth Allen	0
(China) Xiao Guodong	4
(England) Jack Lisowski	4
(Wales) Ryan Day	2
(Republic of Ireland) Ken Doherty	4
(Thailand) Noppon Saengkham	3
(China) Zhao Xintong	4
(England) James Cahill	3
(Poland) Adam Stefanow	2
(Wales) Darren Morgan	4
(Iran) Hossein Vafaei	w/d
(Wales) Matthew Stevens	w/o
(China) Tian Pengfei	4
(England) Allan Taylor	0
(England) Stuart Carrington	4
(Northern Ireland) Joe Swail	3
(Cyprus) Michael Georgiou	1
(Australia) Neil Robertson	4
(England) Christopher Keogan	1
(China) Zhou Yuelong	4
(England) Judd Trump	4
(England) Chris Wakelin	1
(Hong Kong) Marco Fu	3
(Scotland) Graeme Dott	4
(Scotland) John Higgins	4
(England) Mark King	1
(China) Li Hang	w/o
(China) Chen Zhe	w/d
(England) Ali Carter	4
(China) Zhang Yong	1
(Wales) Jak Jones	4
(England) Jamie Cope	3
(Wales) Mark Williams	4
(England) Mark Davis	1
(Thailand) Dechawat Poomjaeng	0
(England) Jimmy Robertson	4
(England) Martin O'Donnell	4
(England) Sam Craigie	3
(England) Andy Hicks	4
(China) Fang Xiongman	3
(England) John Astley	4
(England) Joe Perry	1
(China) Zhang Anda	w/d
(England) Rory McLeod	w/o
(England) Andrew Higginson	2
(Scotland) Anthony McGill	4
(England) Martin Gould	4
(England) Tom Ford	0
(Scotland) Fraser Patrick	1
(China) Yan Bingtao	4
(England) Stuart Bingham	4
(Wales) Lee Walker	2
(England) Adam Duffy	3
(Republic of Ireland) Fergal O'Brien	4
(England) Michael Holt	4
(England) Mark Selby	1
(England) Ian Burns	w/o
(England) Kyren Wilson	w/d

Last 32; Best of 7 frames
(England) Sean O'Sullivan	0
(England) David Gilbert	4
(Wales) Jamie Jones	2
(China) Xiao Guodong	4
(England) Jack Lisowski	3
(Republic of Ireland) Ken Doherty	4
(China) Zhao Xintong	1
(Wales) Darren Morgan	4
(Wales) Matthew Stevens	4
(China) Tian Pengfei	3
(England) Stuart Carrington	1
(Australia) Neil Robertson	4
(China) Zhou Yuelong	1
(England) Judd Trump	4
(Scotland) Graeme Dott	3
(Scotland) John Higgins	4
(China) Li Hang	1
(England) Ali Carter	4
(Wales) Jak Jones	0
(Wales) Mark Williams	4
(England) Jimmy Robertson	4
(England) Martin O'Donnell	3
(England) Andy Hicks	2
(England) John Astley	4
(England) Rory McLeod	1
(Scotland) Anthony McGill	4
(England) Martin Gould	2
(China) Yan Bingtao	4
(England) Stuart Bingham	4
(Republic of Ireland) Fergal O'Brien	2
(England) Michael Holt	4
(England) Ian Burns	3

Last 16; Best of 7 frames
(England) David Gilbert	2
(China) Xiao Guodong	4
(Republic of Ireland) Ken Doherty	3
(Wales) Darren Morgan	4
(Wales) Matthew Stevens	1
(Australia) Neil Robertson	4
(England) Judd Trump	4
(Scotland) John Higgins	2
(England) Ali Carter	2
(Wales) Mark Williams	4
(England) Jimmy Robertson	1
(England) John Astley	4
(Scotland) Anthony McGill	4
(China) Yan Bingtao	0
(England) Stuart Bingham	3
(England) Michael Holt	4

Quarter-finals; Best of 7 frames
(China) Xiao Guodong	2
(Wales) Darren Morgan	4
(Australia) Neil Robertson	4
(England) Judd Trump	1
(Wales) Mark Williams	4
(England) John Astley	1
(Scotland) Anthony McGill	0
(England) Michael Holt	4

Semi-finals; Best of 9 frames
(Wales) Darren Morgan	0
(Australia) Neil Robertson	5
(Wales) Mark Williams	4
(England) Michael Holt	5

Final; Best of 9 frames
(Australia) Neil Robertson	5
(England) Michael Holt	2

== Final ==
Final: Best of 9 frames. Referee: Desislava Bozhilova. Arena Riga, Riga, Latvia, 24 June 2016.
Neil Robertson; Australia	5–2	Michael Holt; England
87–56 (Robertson 56), 40–72, 6–60, 63–19, 89–0 (79), 57–20, 70–31 (69)
79	Highest break	39
0	Century breaks	0
3	50+ breaks	0

== Qualifying ==
These matches were held between 3 and 4 June 2016 at the Preston Guild Hall in Preston, England. All matches were best of 7 frames.

(China) Yu Delu	1–4	(England) Sean O'Sullivan
(Belgium) Luca Brecel	4–0	(Egypt) Hatem Yassen
(England) David Gilbert	4–3	(England) Alfie Burden
(England) Sam Baird	4–1	(Wales) Daniel Wells
(Wales) Jamie Jones	4–1	(England) Jamie Curtis-Barrett
(Scotland) Jamie Burnett	1–4	(England) Gary Wilson
(Norway) Kurt Maflin	3–4	(Wales) Gareth Allen
(China) Xiao Guodong	4–2	(England) Steven Hallworth
(Malta) Alex Borg	1–4	(England) Jack Lisowski
(Wales) Ryan Day	4–2	(Malaysia) Rory Thor
(England) Peter Lines	1–4	(Republic of Ireland) Ken Doherty
(Thailand) Noppon Saengkham	4–1	(England) Ashley Hugill
(China) Zhao Xintong	4–1	(Brazil) Itaro Santos
(England) James Cahill	4–2	(England) Robert Milkins
(England) Ben Woollaston	1–4	(Poland) Adam Stefanow
(England) Bradley Jones	3–4 (Note: Match was held over and played in Riga.)	(Wales) Darren Morgan (Note: Wildcard)
(England) Elliot Slessor	1–4	(Iran) Hossein Vafaei
(England) Matthew Selt	w/d–w/o	(Wales) Matthew Stevens
(China) Tian Pengfei	4–3	(England) Mike Dunn
(England) Allan Taylor	4–2	(England) Liam Highfield
(Scotland) Eden Sharav	0–4	(England) Stuart Carrington
(England) David Grace	2–4	(Northern Ireland) Joe Swail
(Cyprus) Michael Georgiou	4–2	(China) Wang Yuchen
(Scotland) Michael Collumb	2–4	(Australia) Neil Robertson
(England) Christopher Keogan	4–1	(England) Hammad Miah
(China) Zhou Yuelong	4–1	(Pakistan) Hamza Akbar
(Scotland) Rhys Clark	0–4	(England) Judd Trump
(England) Chris Wakelin	4–1	(England) Rod Lawler
(Hong Kong) Marco Fu	4–1	(Latvia) Tatjana Vasiljeva
(Scotland) Graeme Dott	4–2	(Wales) Duane Jones
(Thailand) Thepchaiya Un-Nooh	3–4	(Scotland) John Higgins
(England) Mark King	4–3	(England) Oliver Lines

(England) Michael Wild	2–4	(China) Li Hang
(China) Chen Zhe	4–1	(Republic of Ireland) Josh Boileau
(England) Ali Carter	4–0	(England) Paul Davison
(England) Mark Joyce	3–4	(China) Zhang Yong
(Northern Ireland) Mark Allen	w/d–w/o	(Wales) Jak Jones
(Scotland) Alan McManus	2–4	(England) Jamie Cope
(England) Louis Heathcote	1–4	(Wales) Mark Williams
(England) Anthony Hamilton	3–4	(England) Mark Davis
(Thailand) Dechawat Poomjaeng	4–2	(England) Jason Weston
(England) Jimmy Robertson	4–0	(England) Oliver Brown
(England) Martin O'Donnell	4–3	(England) Daniel Womersley
(England) Brandon Sargeant	2–4	(England) Sam Craigie
(England) Andy Hicks	w/o–w/d	(Republic of Ireland) Leo Fernandez
(Scotland) Stephen Maguire	2–4	(China) Fang Xiongman
(England) Craig Steadman	2–4	(England) John Astley
(England) Peter Ebdon	2–4	(England) Joe Perry
(China) Zhang Anda	4–3	(England) Charlie Walters
(England) Rory McLeod	4–1	(Finland) Robin Hull
(England) Andrew Higginson	4–2	(Wales) Dominic Dale
(England) Nigel Bond	1–4	(Scotland) Anthony McGill
(England) Martin Gould	4–0	(England) Zak Surety
(Wales) David John	w/d–w/o	(England) Tom Ford
(Scotland) Ross Muir	2–4	(Scotland) Fraser Patrick
(England) Mitchell Mann	0–4	(China) Yan Bingtao
(Isle of Man) Darryl Hill	1–4	(England) Stuart Bingham
(Wales) Lee Walker	4–1	(England) Sydney Wilson
(England) Adam Duffy	4–2	(England) Robbie Williams
(England) Sanderson Lam	3–4	(Republic of Ireland) Fergal O'Brien
(Scotland) Scott Donaldson	3–4	(England) Michael Holt
(Thailand) Sunny Akani	3–4	(England) Mark Selby
(England) Ian Burns	4–2	(Australia) Kurt Dunham
(England) Antony Parsons	2–4	(England) Kyren Wilson

== Century breaks ==
=== Qualifying stage centuries ===
Total: 15

- 135, 111 – John Higgins
- 131 – Mark King
- 124, 100 – Stuart Carrington
- 121 – Anthony Hamilton
- 111 – Li Hang
- 110, 108 – Mark Williams
- 110 – John Astley
- 110 – Peter Ebdon
- 108 – Zhang Anda
- 104 – Mike Dunn
- 103 – Mark Selby
- 101 – Joe Perry

=== Televised stage centuries ===
Total: 31

- 138 – Martin O'Donnell
- 135 – Zhao Xintong
- 134, 102 – Jimmy Robertson
- 132 – Zhou Yuelong
- 130 – Ian Burns
- 125 – Mark Davis
- 124 – Gary Wilson
- 123 – Mark Williams
- 118 – Michael Holt
- 117, 110, 107 – John Astley
- 115 – Stuart Bingham
- 112, 107 – Anthony McGill
- 108, 104, 100, 100 – Neil Robertson
- 108 – Li Hang
- 106 – Stuart Carrington
- 105, 100 – Sean O'Sullivan
- 105 – Fergal O'Brien
- 105 – Jack Lisowski
- 103 – Yan Bingtao
- 103 – Judd Trump
- 102 – Xiao Guodong
- 101 – Jamie Cope
- 100 – Marco Fu
