= 2017 Q School =

Snooker tournaments

Tournament information
- Dates: 9–20 May 2017
- Venue: Guild Hall
- City: Preston
- Country: England
- Format: Qualifying School
- Qualifiers: 12 via the 2 events and Order of Merit

The 2017 Q School was a series of two snooker tournaments held at the start of the 2017–18 snooker season. An event for amateur players, it served as a qualification event for a place on the professional World Snooker Tour for the following two seasons. The events took place in May 2017 at the Guild Hall in Preston, Lancashire, England with a total 12 players qualifying via the two tournaments and the Order of Merit.

== Format ==
The 2017 Q School consisted of two events. The two events had 206 entries competing for 12 places on the main tour, four players qualifying from each of the two events, with a further four places available from the Q Tour Order of Merit.. All matches were the best of seven frames.

== Event 1 ==
The first 2017 Q School event was held from 9 to 14 May 2017 at the Guild Hall in Preston, England. Lukas Kleckers, Allan Taylor, Billy Joe Castle and Ashley Hugill qualified. The results of the four final matches are given below.

- Lukas Kleckers (GER) 4–1 Martin O'Donnell (ENG)
- Allan Taylor (ENG) 4–0 Sean O'Sullivan (ENG)
- Billy Joe Castle (ENG) 4–2 Paul Davison (ENG)
- Ashley Hugill (ENG) 4–2 William Lemons (ENG)

== Event 2 ==
The second 2017 Q School event was held from 15 to 20 May 2017 at the Guild Hall in Preston, England. Duane Jones, Sanderson Lam, Paul Davison and Chen Zifan qualified. The results of the four final matches are given below.

- Duane Jones (WAL) 4–2 Alex Davies (ENG)
- Sanderson Lam (ENG) 4–2 Joe Swail (NIR)
- Paul Davison (ENG) 4–2 James Cahill (ENG)
- Chen Zifan (CHN) 4–1 Ben Jones (WAL)

== Q School Order of Merit ==
A Q School Order of Merit was produced for players who didn't qualify automatically from the two events. Four places on the main tour were given to the leading four players in the Order of Merit, Zhang Yong, Sean O'Sullivan, Joe Swail and Martin O'Donnell. The Order of Merit was also used to top up fields for the 2017–18 snooker season where an event failed to attract the required number of entries. The rankings in the Order of Merit were based on the number of frames won in the two Q School events. Players who received a bye into the second round were awarded four points for round one. Where players were equal, those who won the most frames in the first event were ranked higher.

The leading players in the Q School Order of Merit are given below, those with Q in brackets were awarded places on the main tour.

Rank	Player	Event 1	Event 2	Total
1	(China) Zhang Yong (Q)	17	19	36
2	(England) Sean O'Sullivan (Q)	20	15	35
3	(Northern Ireland) Joe Swail (Q)	11	22	33
4	(England) Martin O'Donnell (Q)	21	11	32
5	(Wales) Jackson Page	15	17	32
6	(China) Hu Hao	12	19	31
7	(England) Alex Davies	8	22	30
8	(Wales) Jamie Clarke	16	13	29
9	(Wales) Ben Jones	8	21	29
10	(England) William Lemons	22	5	27

== Two-season performance of qualifiers ==
The following table shows the rankings of the 12 qualifiers from the 2017 Q School, at the end of the 2018–19 snooker season, the end of their two guaranteed seasons on the tour, together with their tour status for the 2019–20 snooker season. Players in the top-64 of the rankings retained their place on the tour while those outside the top-64 lost their place unless they qualified under a different category.

Player	End of 2018–19 season		Status for 2019–20 season
Player	Money	Ranking	Status for 2019–20 season
Lukas Kleckers (GER)	15,600	111	Amateur
Allan Taylor (ENG)	32,850	91	Amateur
Billy Joe Castle (ENG)	24,725	99	Qualified through the 2019 Q School
Ashley Hugill (ENG)	20,500	106	Amateur
Duane Jones (WAL)	58,500	76	Qualified through the one-year list
Sanderson Lam (ENG)	11,500	114	Amateur
Paul Davison (ENG)	32,500	92	Amateur
Chen Zifan (CHN)	22,100	102	Qualified through the 2019 Q School
Zhang Yong (CHN)	53,000	80	Amateur
Sean O'Sullivan (ENG)	11,000	115	Amateur
Joe Swail (NIR)	34,600	89	Amateur
Martin O'Donnell (ENG)	146,100	42	Retained place on tour
