= Adam Duffy =

English snooker player (born 1989)

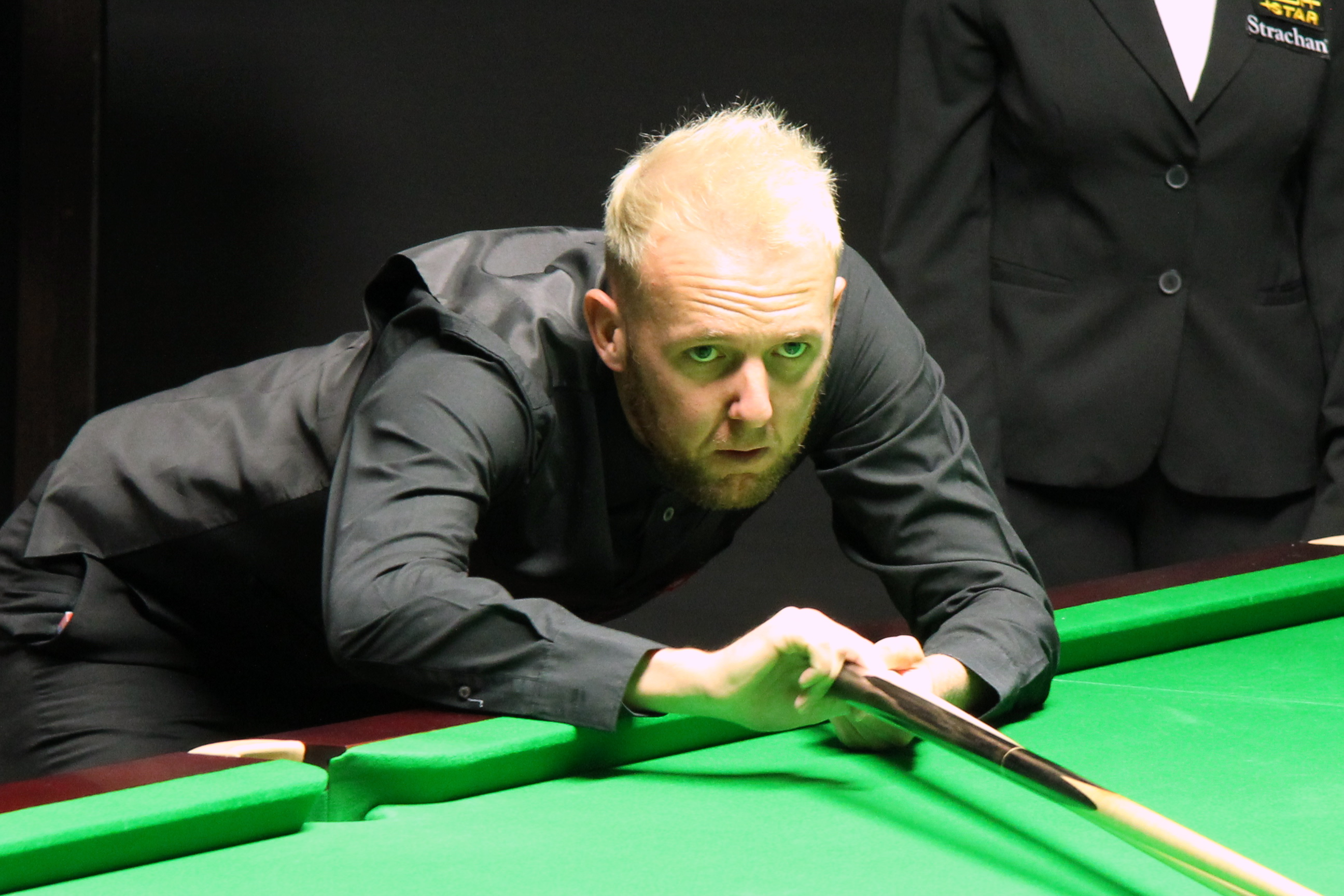
- Paul Hunter Classic 2016

Personal information
- Born: 30 March 1989 (age 37) Sheffield, England

Sport
- Country: England
- Sport: Snooker
- Professional: 2011–2014, 2016–2018, 2022–2024
- Highest ranking: 56 (June–August 2013)
- Best ranking finish: Last 16 (x1)

Adam Duffy (born 30 March 1989) is an English former professional snooker player.

Duffy qualified for the 2011–12 professional Main Tour as one of four semi-finalists from the third and final 2011 Q School event.

== Career ==
=== Debut season ===
As a new player on the tour Duffy would need to win four qualifying matches to reach the main stage of the ranking event tournaments. He came closest to doing this in the sixth event of the year, the Welsh Open, where he received a bye through round one and then beat James Wattana and Jack Lisowski, before being whitewashed 0–4 by former world champion Peter Ebdon in the final qualifying round. He also reached the last 16 of Event 2 of the minor-ranking Players Tour Championship series, which included a 4–0 victory over world number one Mark Selby. Duffy finished his first year as a professional ranked world number 62, inside the top 64 who guarantee their places for the 2012–13 season. He was the second highest ranked of all the new players on the tour, after China's Yu Delu who was number 58.

=== 2012/2013 season ===
Duffy had a poor 2012–13 season as he lost his first six games and only won a total of four matches in ranking event qualifiers and two matches in Players Tour Championship tournaments. He finished a lowly 108th on the PTC Order of Merit, but did end the season ranked world number 60, his highest ranking to date.

=== 2013/2014 season ===
In his opening match, Duffy defeated Tony Drago 5–2 to qualify for the 2013 Wuxi Classic in China, but lost 5–3 to Lu Ning in the wildcard round. At the UK Championship Duffy beat Barry Pinches in a deciding frame to face reigning world champion Ronnie O'Sullivan in the second round. He led twice before the interval but went on to lose 6–3. His results during the year meant that he dropped 31 places to world number 91 in the rankings to drop off the tour, with Duffy entering the 2014 Q School in an attempt to win his place back. He came within two victories of doing so in the second event, but lost 4–3 to Lee Walker.

=== 2014/2015 season ===
Duffy entered all the European Tour events during the season, and thanks to his high Q School ranking he was able to enter a number of ranking tournaments as well. At the Paul Hunter Classic, Duffy overcame Ryan Day and Gerard Greene both 4–3, before losing 4–0 to Fergal O'Brien in the last 32. He qualified for the Indian Open by beating Jack Lisowski 4–2 and then edged out Gary Wilson 4–3 to play Judd Trump in the second round. Duffy came from 3–1 down to level at 3–3, but would lose the deciding frame to the world number six in a three-hour match. However, the display seemed to give him confidence heading into the World Championship as he defeated Martin Gould 10–6 and won seven of the last eight frames to beat Sam Baird 10–7. Duffy played Jamie Jones in an attempt to become the first player from Sheffield to play at the Crucible, but was narrowly beaten 10–8. Duffy felt he had run out of steam during the match against an opponent who had been playing in tournaments all year, while Duffy had his playing opportunities limited due to his amateur status. In the first event of 2015 Q School, Duffy reached the final round and made breaks of 107, 93 and 70 against Eden Sharav but lost 4–3.

=== 2015/2016 season ===
In the first round of the 2015 UK Championship, Duffy pulled off a huge shock by eliminating world number nine and two-time winner of the event Ding Junhui 6–2. He credited the win to working hard on his game at the academy in Sheffield. He forced a deciding frame against Joe Swail in the next round having been 5–3 down, but lost it. He qualified for the China Open by beating Thepchaiya Un-Nooh 5–3, but would later withdraw from the event. Duffy lost in the final round of the EBSA Qualifying Tour Play-Offs to Sam Craigie, but by twice losing in the fifth round of the 2016 Q School he earned a two-year tour card via the Q School Order of Merit.

=== 2016/2017 season ===
He played in the final qualifying round for the Shanghai Masters after winning three matches, but was edged out 5–4 by Robert Milkins. Duffy lost in the second round of both the Paul Hunter Classic and Northern Ireland Open 4–1 to Lee Walker and 4–3 to Peter Ebdon respectively. He was beaten in eight of his final nine matches of the season after this.

2017/2018 Duffy had a very poor season. His best performance was reaching the last stage of the World Championship Qualifiers where he lost 10–2 to Xiao Guodong. There was controversy in the 2nd frame where the ref called a waistcoat foul when Duffy was reaching across to pot the brown. He only required the brown and blue to win the frame, however Guodong cleared up to take a 2–0 lead.

He dropped off the tour at the end of the 2017/18 season and entered the 2018 Q School to win back his tour place, but his best result was a loss in the final round of the second event to Craig Steadman. He entered again in 2019.

== Personal life ==
Duffy works part-time as a builder for his father's firm. He is a big fan of Sheffield United F.C.

== Performance and rankings timeline ==
| Tournament | 2010/ 11 | 2011/ 12 | 2012/ 13 | 2013/ 14 | 2014/ 15 | 2015/ 16 | 2016/ 17 | 2017/ 18 | 2018/ 19 | 2019/ 20 | 2022/ 23 | 2023/ 24 |
|---|---|---|---|---|---|---|---|---|---|---|---|---|
| Ranking (Note: It shows the ranking at the beginning of the season) | (Note: He was an amateur) | (Note: New players on the Main Tour don't have a ranking) | 62 | 60 | | | | 86 | | | | 88 |
Ranking tournaments
| Championship League | Non-Ranking Event | | | | | | | | | | RR | RR |
| European Masters | Tournament Not Held | | | | | | LQ | 1R | 1R | A | LQ | 1R |
| British Open | Tournament Not Held | | | | | | | | | | LQ | LQ |
| English Open | Tournament Not Held | | | | | | 1R | 1R | 1R | A | LQ | 1R |
| Wuhan Open | Tournament Not Held | | | | | | | | | | | LQ |
| Northern Ireland Open | Tournament Not Held | | | | | | 2R | 2R | 1R | A | LQ | LQ |
| International Championship | Not Held | | LQ | 1R | A | LQ | LQ | LQ | A | A | NH | LQ |
| UK Championship | A | LQ | LQ | 2R | A | 2R | 1R | 1R | 1R | A | LQ | LQ |
| Shoot Out | Non-Ranking Event | | | | | | 1R | 1R | 4R | A | 2R | 1R |
| Scottish Open | Not Held | | MR | Not Held | | | 1R | 1R | 1R | A | LQ | LQ |
| World Grand Prix | Tournament Not Held | | | | NR | DNQ | DNQ | DNQ | DNQ | DNQ | DNQ | DNQ |
| German Masters | A | LQ | LQ | LQ | LQ | LQ | LQ | LQ | LQ | A | LQ | LQ |
| Welsh Open | A | LQ | LQ | 1R | A | 1R | 1R | 1R | 2R | A | LQ | 2R |
| Players Championship (Note: The event was called the Players Tour Championship Grand Final (2010/2011–2015/2016)) | DNQ | DNQ | DNQ | DNQ | DNQ | DNQ | DNQ | DNQ | DNQ | DNQ | DNQ | DNQ |
| World Open | A | LQ | LQ | LQ | Not Held | | LQ | LQ | LQ | A | NH | WD |
| Tour Championship | Tournament Not Held | | | | | | | | DNQ | DNQ | DNQ | DNQ |
| World Championship | A | LQ | LQ | LQ | LQ | LQ | LQ | LQ | LQ | LQ | LQ | LQ |
Former ranking tournaments
| Wuxi Classic | Non-Ranking | | LQ | WR | LQ | Tournament Not Held | | | | | | |
| Australian Goldfields Open | NH | LQ | LQ | LQ | LQ | LQ | Tournament Not Held | | | | | |
| Shanghai Masters | A | LQ | LQ | LQ | A | LQ | LQ | 1R | Non-Ranking | | NH | NR |
| Paul Hunter Classic | Minor-Ranking Event | | | | | | 2R | 1R | A | NR | Not Held | |
| Indian Open | Not Held | | | LQ | 2R | NH | LQ | WD | LQ | Not Held | | |
| China Open | A | LQ | LQ | LQ | LQ | LQ | LQ | LQ | A | Not Held | | |
| Riga Masters (Note: The event was called the Riga Open (2014/2015–2015/2016)) | Tournament Not Held | | | | MR | | 1R | LQ | LQ | A | Not Held | |
| China Championship | Tournament Not Held | | | | | | NR | LQ | A | A | Not Held | |
| Gibraltar Open | Tournament Not Held | | | | | MR | 1R | 1R | A | LQ | Not Held | |
| WST Classic | Tournament Not Held | | | | | | | | | | 1R | NH |
Former non-ranking tournaments
| Shoot Out | A | A | 1R | 1R | A | A | Ranking Event | | | | | |
| Six-red World Championship | A | NH | A | A | A | A | A | A | A | A | LQ | NH |

Performance Table Legend
| LQ | lost in the qualifying draw | #R | lost in the early rounds of the tournament (WR = Wildcard round, RR = Round robin) | QF | lost in the quarter-finals |
| SF | lost in the semi-finals | F | lost in the final | W | won the tournament |
| DNQ | did not qualify for the tournament | A | did not participate in the tournament | WD | withdrew from the tournament |

| NH / Not Held | means an event was not held. |
| NR / Non-Ranking Event | means an event is/was no longer a ranking event. |
| R / Ranking Event | means an event is/was a ranking event. |
| MR / Minor-Ranking Event | means an event is/was a minor-ranking event. |

== Career finals ==
=== Pro-am finals: 1 (1 title) ===
| Outcome | No. | Year | Championship | Opponent in the final | Score |
|---|---|---|---|---|---|
| Winner | 1. | 2012 | Paul Hunter English Open | (England) Craig Steadman | 6–3 |

=== Amateur finals: 3 (2 titles) ===
| Outcome | No. | Year | Championship | Opponent in the final | Score |
|---|---|---|---|---|---|
| Winner | 1. | 2019 | Challenge Tour – Event 9 | (England) Matthew Glasby | 3–1 |
| Winner | 2. | 2020 | Challenge Tour – Event 10 | (England) Kuldesh Johal | 3–1 |
| Runner-up | 1. | 2020 | Challenge Tour – Playoffs | (England) Allan Taylor | 0–4 |
