= Allan Taylor (snooker player) =

English snooker player (born 1984)

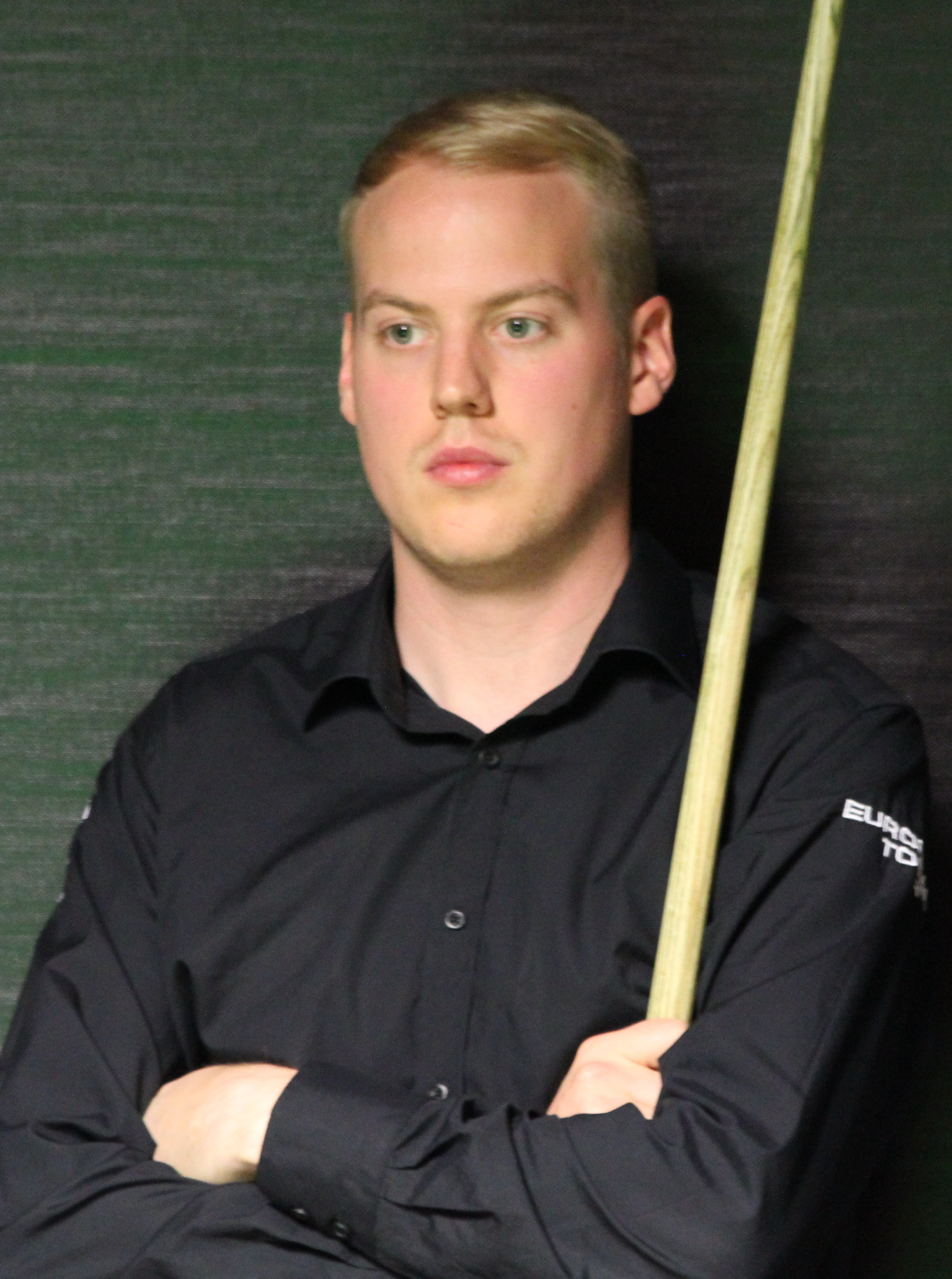
- Paul Hunter Classic 2014

Personal information
- Nickname: Albino Assassin
- Born: 28 November 1984 (age 41) Liverpool, Merseyside

Sport
- Country: England
- Sport: Snooker
- Professional: 2013–2019, 2020–2026
- Highest ranking: 68 (May 2026)
- Best ranking finish: Last 16 (2024 Shoot Out)

Allan Taylor (born 28 November 1984) is an English former professional snooker player, who comes from Basildon, Essex but resides in Southend. He used to work at a police station in Birkenhead, supporting the police force by studying CCTV footage.

Taylor turned professional in 2013 after being the sixth highest ranked amateur on the PTC Order of Merit, winning a tour card for the 2013–14 and 2014–15 seasons. He then remained on tour until 2019, however upon finishing outside the top 64 he lost his tour card and was unable to re-qualify for the tour through the 2019 Q School. He practices and prepares in St Mary's Mens Club.

== Career ==
=== Debut season ===
Taylor won just two matches during the 2013–14 season to end his first season on tour ranked world number 123.

=== 2014/2015 season ===
Taylor lost 6–2 to Anthony McGill in the first round of the UK Championship. A few weeks later he beat Michael Holt 4–3 to qualify for the Indian Open, where he was defeated 4–3 by Li Hang in the first round. At the end of the season Taylor was the world number 107 which would have seen him lose his place on the tour, however he finished 62nd on the European Order of Merit which earned him one of the eight two-year cards on offer for non-qualified players.

=== 2015/2016 season ===
A 5–2 win over Simon Dent and successive last frame deciders against Stuart Carrington and Li Hang saw Taylor reach the final qualifying round for the 2015 Australian Goldfields Open in which he made a 132 break against Mark King, but lost 5–4. He could not win another match until February when, at the Welsh Open, he tasted victory at the venue stage of a ranking event for the first time in his career by defeating Oliver Lines 4–1. Taylor lost 4–2 to Anthony Hamilton in the second round.

=== 2016/2017 season ===
Taylor qualified for the 2016 Riga Masters, World Open and Indian Open, but was knocked out in the first round of each. He lost in the second round of the Northern Ireland Open and Welsh Open 4–2 to Li Hang and 4–1 to Robin Hull respectively. At the Gibraltar Open, Taylor advanced to the last 32 of a ranking event for the first time with wins over Saqib Nasir and Elliot Slessor. He moved 3–2 ahead of Shaun Murphy, but would be defeated 4–3. Taylor needed to come through the 2017 Q School to remain on tour as he lost his spot at the end of the season, due to his world ranking of 86. In the last 16 of the first event he needed a snooker when 3–2 down to Daniel Ward. He got it when Ward went in-off and made a 96 in the deciding frame, before whitewashing Sean O'Sullivan 4–0 to earn a new two-year tour card.

== Performance and rankings timeline ==
Tournament	2010/ 11	2011/ 12	2012/ 13	2013/ 14	2014/ 15	2015/ 16	2016/ 17	2017/ 18	2018/ 19	2019/ 20	2020/ 21	2021/ 22	2022/ 23	2023/ 24	2024/ 25	2025/ 26
Ranking (Note: It shows the ranking at the beginning of the season)	(Note: He was an amateur)			(Note: New players on the Main Tour don't have a ranking)	123	(Note: Players qualified through European Tour Order of Merit started the season without prize money ranking points)	111	(Note: Players qualified through Q School started the season without prize money ranking points)	78			77	(Note: Players qualified One Year Ranking List started the season without ranking points)	81		74
Ranking tournaments
Championship League	Non-Ranking Event										RR	RR	RR	RR	RR	RR
Saudi Arabia Masters	Tournament Not Held														3R	3R
Wuhan Open	Tournament Not Held													LQ	1R	1R
English Open	Tournament Not Held						1R	1R	2R	A	3R	WD	LQ	1R	LQ	LQ
British Open	Tournament Not Held											3R	LQ	LQ	1R	1R
Xi'an Grand Prix	Tournament Not Held														LQ	LQ
Northern Ireland Open	Tournament Not Held						2R	1R	1R	A	3R	1R	LQ	LQ	LQ	LQ
International Championship	Not Held		A	LQ	LQ	LQ	LQ	LQ	LQ	A	Not Held			LQ	LQ	LQ
UK Championship	A	A	A	1R	1R	1R	1R	1R	1R	A	1R	1R	LQ	LQ	LQ	LQ
Shoot Out	Non-Ranking Event						2R	3R	3R	A	3R	3R	1R	1R	4R	2R
Scottish Open	Not Held		MR	Not Held			1R	2R	1R	A	1R	1R	1R	LQ	LQ	LQ
German Masters	A	A	A	LQ	LQ	LQ	LQ	LQ	LQ	A	LQ	LQ	LQ	LQ	1R	LQ
World Grand Prix	Tournament Not Held				NR	DNQ	DNQ	DNQ	DNQ	DNQ	DNQ	DNQ	DNQ	DNQ	DNQ	DNQ
Players Championship (Note: The event was called the Players Tour Championship Grand Final (2010/2011–2015/2016))	DNQ	DNQ	DNQ	DNQ	DNQ	DNQ	DNQ	DNQ	DNQ	DNQ	DNQ	DNQ	DNQ	DNQ	DNQ	DNQ
Welsh Open	A	A	A	1R	1R	2R	2R	1R	1R	A	1R	1R	LQ	1R	LQ	LQ
World Open	A	A	A	LQ	Not Held		1R	2R	LQ	A	Not Held			LQ	LQ	2R
Tour Championship	Tournament Not Held								DNQ	DNQ	DNQ	DNQ	DNQ	DNQ	DNQ	DNQ
World Championship	A	A	A	LQ	LQ	LQ	LQ	LQ	LQ	LQ	LQ	LQ	LQ	LQ	LQ	LQ
Former ranking tournaments
Wuxi Classic	Non-Ranking		A	LQ	LQ	Tournament Not Held										
Australian Goldfields Open	NH	A	LQ	LQ	LQ	LQ	Tournament Not Held									
Shanghai Masters	A	A	A	LQ	LQ	LQ	LQ	LQ	Non-Ranking		Not Held			Non-Ranking		
Paul Hunter Classic	Minor-Ranking Event						1R	1R	2R	NR	Tournament Not Held					
Indian Open	Not Held			LQ	1R	NH	1R	LQ	LQ	Tournament Not Held						
China Open	A	A	A	LQ	LQ	LQ	1R	LQ	LQ	Tournament Not Held						
Riga Masters (Note: The event was called the Riga Open (2014/2015–2015/2016))	Tournament Not Held				Minor-Rank		1R	LQ	LQ	1R	Tournament Not Held					
China Championship	Tournament Not Held						NR	2R	1R	A	Tournament Not Held					
WST Pro Series	Tournament Not Held										RR	Tournament Not Held				
Turkish Masters	Tournament Not Held											LQ	Tournament Not Held			
Gibraltar Open	Tournament Not Held					MR	3R	3R	1R	2R	2R	1R	Tournament Not Held			
WST Classic	Tournament Not Held												2R	Not Held		
European Masters	Tournament Not Held						LQ	LQ	2R	A	3R	LQ	A	2R	Not Held	
Former non-ranking tournaments
Six-red World Championship	A	NH	A	A	A	A	A	A	A	A	Not Held		LQ	Not Held		

Performance Table Legend
LQ	lost in the qualifying draw	#R	lost in the early rounds of the tournament (WR = Wildcard round, RR = Round robin)	QF	lost in the quarter-finals
SF	lost in the semi-finals	F	lost in the final	W	won the tournament
DNQ	did not qualify for the tournament	A	did not participate in the tournament	WD	withdrew from the tournament

NH / Not Held	means an event was not held.
NR / Non-Ranking Event	means an event is/was no longer a ranking event.
R / Ranking Event	means an event is/was a ranking event.
MR / Minor-Ranking Event	means an event is/was a minor-ranking event.

== Career finals ==
=== Amateur finals: 2 (2 titles) ===
Outcome	No.	Year	Championship	Opponent in the final	Score
Winner	1.	2020	Challenge Tour – Event 5	(Scotland) Michael Collumb	3–1
Winner	2.	2020	Challenge Tour – Playoffs	(England) Adam Duffy	4–0
