= 2019–20 Challenge Tour =

Series of snooker tournaments

Details
- Duration: 31 August 2019 – 20 July 2020
- Tournaments: 11

The 2019–20 Challenge Tour was a series of snooker tournaments that took place during the 2019–20 snooker season. The Challenge Tour was the second-tier tour for players not on the main World Snooker Tour. The top player in the final rankings earned a two-year card to the World Snooker Tour from the 2020–21 snooker season. The following eight players in the rankings progressed to a play-off event, with the winner of that event also receiving a two-year place on the World Snooker Tour. Two of the events were postponed: Event five was rearranged due to poor weather conditions, whilst the play-off was halted due to the COVID-19 pandemic.

Played between August and July, the series was contested over ten events. Ashley Hugill finished top of the rankings, winning two of the events. Hugill had already earned a place on the World Snooker Tour having won the 2020 WSF Open, so second placed Lukas Kleckers earned a tour card. Third ranked Andrew Pagett also received a place on the World Snooker Tour after his victory in the 2020 EBSA European Snooker Championship. Allan Taylor, who had finished seventh in the rankings, won the play-off tournament and a place on the World Snooker Tour.

== Format ==
The Challenge Tour is a series of ten snooker tournaments, featuring as a qualification route for the World Snooker Tour. Featuring 10 events across Europe, each tournament had 64 participants. The leading 56 players in the 2019 Q School Order of Merit who had not qualified for the main tour, as well as eight wildcards are eligible to play. If there are fewer than 64 entries, additional entries from the Q School Order of Merit could enter. All matches are for the original ten event were held as the best-of-five frames. The player with the most prize money from the ten events received participation for the World Snooker Tour for the 2020–21 and 2021–22 snooker season. A final event, the Challenge Tour play-off was held for the eight highest prize fund winners, who had not already received a tour card. The winner of the play-off, contested as the best-of-seven frames was also awarded a two-year tour card.

=== Prize fund ===
Each event featured a prize fund of £10,000 with the winner receiving £2,000.

- Winner: £2,000
- Runner-up: £1,000
- Semi-final: £700
- Quarter-final: £500
- Last 16: £200
- Last 32: £125
- Total: £10,000

=== Participants ===
The leading 56 players in the 2019 Q School Order of Merit, excluding the 16 who qualified for the main tour, were automatically eligible to play.

== Summary ==
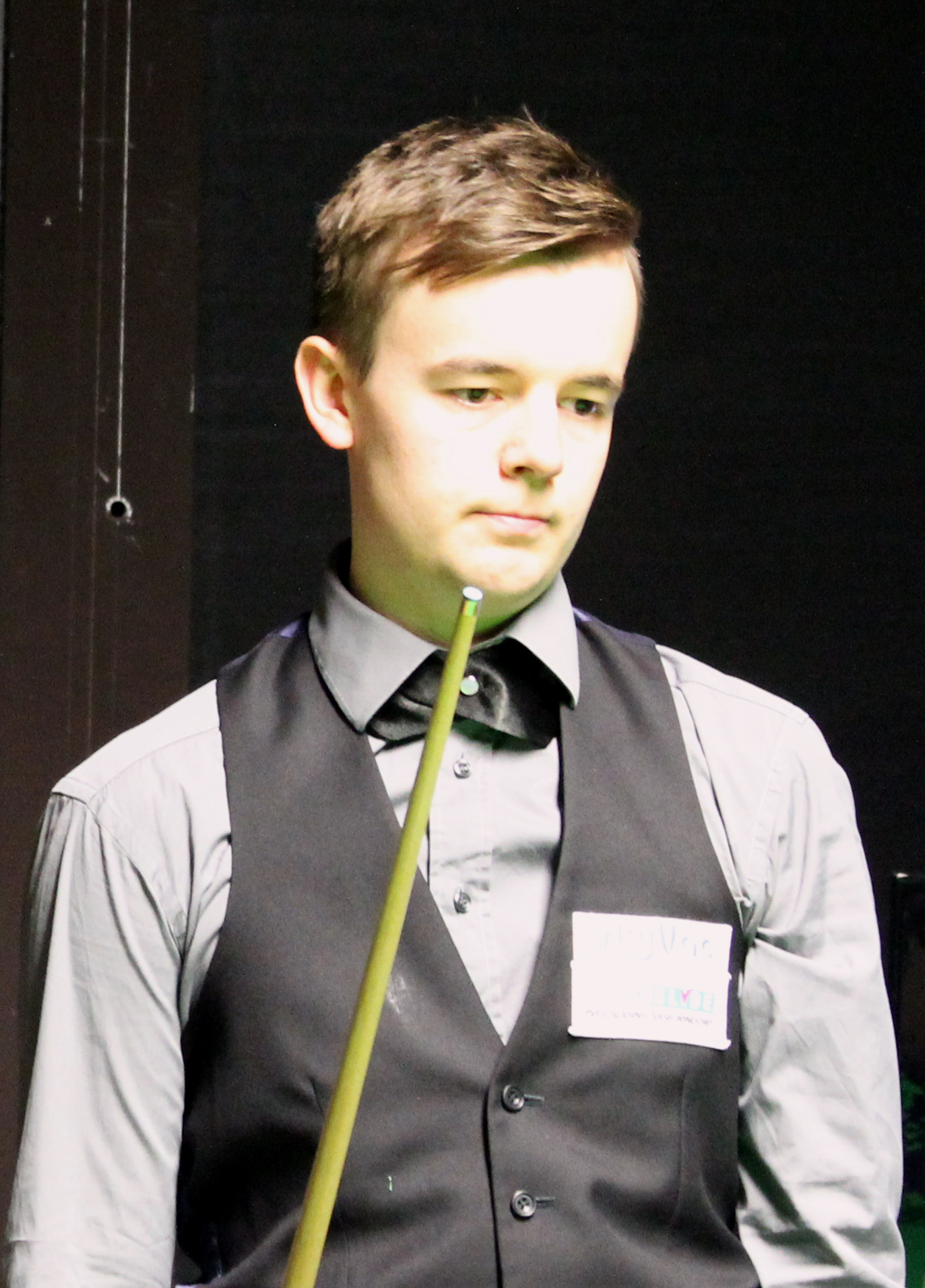
Ashley Hugill won two events, and was the highest ranked player on the Challenge Tour.

The first event was won by Ka Wai Cheung, who defeated Oliver Brown 3–1 in the final in Nuremberg, Germany. Jake Nicholson defeated Welshman Andrew Pagett in the second event, in Berkshire, England. Paggett then won the third event, defeating Robbie McGuigan 3–0 in the final. At the fourth event in Bruges, Belgium, Ashley Hugill defeated Aaron Hill 3–1. Allan Taylor won the fifth event, defeating Scottish player Michael Collumb in the final. Brown won the sixth tournament, defeating Hugill in Budapest, Hungary. Scottish 17-year-old Dean Young overcame Paggett in Pelt, Belgium. Lukas Kleckers completed a 3–1 win over Tyler Rees in Tamworth, England in event 8. Hugill won his second title in event 9 in Llanelli, Wales after a 3–1 win over Sydney Wilson. The final event was won by Adam Duffy, who beat Kuldesh Johal in Leicester, England.

Hugill finished the season as the highest ranked player, but had won the 2020 WSF Open, which gave him a place on the World Snooker Tour for the following two seasons. As such, second placed Lukas Kleckers qualified from the Challenge Tour to the main tour for the next two seasons. Third placed Andrew Pagett also received a tour card, having won the 2020 EBSA European Snooker Championship. The next eight highest ranked players took part in the play-off in Sheffield in England for a final World Snooker Tour place for the following two seasons. The play-off was postponed until August 2020 due to the COVID-19 pandemic, but was won by Taylor, who completed a 4–0 whitewash victory over Duffy.

== Results ==
Below is the schedule for the eleven events.

| Date | | Country | Tournament | Venue | City | Field | Winner | Runner-up | Score | Ref. |
|---|---|---|---|---|---|---|---|---|---|---|
| 31 Aug | 1 Sep | GER | Event 1 | Ballroom Nürnberg | Nuremberg | 67 | (Hong Kong) Ka Wai Cheung | (England) Oliver Brown | 3–1 | |
| 21 Sep | 22 Sep | ENG | Event 2 | The Crucible Sports & Social Club | Newbury | 64 | (England) Jake Nicholson | (Wales) Andrew Pagett | 3–1 | |
| 5 Oct | 6 Oct | ENG | Event 3 | Northern Snooker Centre | Leeds | 64 | (Wales) Andrew Pagett | (Northern Ireland) Robbie McGuigan | 3–0 | |
| 19 Oct | 20 Oct | BEL | Event 4 | The Trickshot | Bruges | 58 | (England) Ashley Hugill | (Republic of Ireland) Aaron Hill | 3–1 | |
| 28 Feb | 29 Feb (Note: The event was postponed due to weather.) | ENG | Event 5 | The Winchester | Leicester | 64 | (England) Allan Taylor | (Scotland) Michael Collumb | 3–1 | |
| 16 Nov | 17 Nov | HUN | Event 6 | Hungary Snooker Academy | Budapest | 62 | (England) Oliver Brown | (England) Ashley Hugill | 3–1 | |
| 14 Dec | 15 Dec | BEL | Event 7 | De Maxx | Pelt | 42 | (Scotland) Dean Young | (Wales) Andrew Pagett | 3–1 | |
| 18 Jan | 19 Jan | ENG | Event 8 | Tamworth Sports Bar | Tamworth | 60 | (Germany) Lukas Kleckers | (Wales) Tyler Rees | 3–1 | |
| 15 Feb | 16 Feb | WAL | Event 9 | Terry Griffiths Matchroom | Llanelli | 52 | (England) Ashley Hugill | (England) Sydney Wilson | 3–1 | |
| 1 Mar | 2 Mar | ENG | Event 10 | The Winchester | Leicester | 61 | (England) Adam Duffy | (England) Kuldesh Johal | 3–1 | |
| 20 Jul | 20 Jul (Note: Postponed due to the coronavirus pandemic) | ENG | Tour Playoff | English Institute of Sport | Sheffield | 8 | (England) Allan Taylor | (England) Adam Duffy | 4–0 | |

=== Rankings ===
Below is the leading 20 players in the prize money rankings over the series.

| Rank | Player | Event 1 | Event 2 | Event 3 | Event 4 | Event 5 | Event 6 | Event 7 | Event 8 | Event 9 | Event 10 | Total (£) |
|---|---|---|---|---|---|---|---|---|---|---|---|---|
| 1 | (England) Ashley Hugill | 125 | 125 | 500 | 2,000 | 125 | 1,000 | 700 | 0 | 2,000 | 125 | 6,700 |
| 2 | (Germany) Lukas Kleckers | 200 | 125 | 500 | 700 | 700 | 700 | 500 | 2,000 | 0 | 500 | 5,925 |
| 3 | (Wales) Andrew Pagett | 500 | 1,000 | 2,000 | 125 | 200 | 200 | 1,000 | 125 | 125 | 125 | 5,400 |
| 4 | (Scotland) Dean Young | 200 | 0 | 0 | 700 | 125 | 125 | 2,000 | 200 | 200 | 700 | 4,250 |
| 5 | (England) Adam Duffy | – | 500 | 125 | 200 | 0 | 500 | 125 | 500 | 0 | 2,000 | 3,950 |
| 6 | (England) Oliver Brown | 1,000 | – | – | 0 | 0 | 2,000 | 0 | 0 | 125 | 125 | 3,250 |
| 7 | (England) Allan Taylor | – | 700 | 125 | – | 2,000 | – | – | 200 | – | 200 | 3,225 |
| 8 | (England) Patrick Whelan | 700 | 0 | 125 | 500 | 125 | 200 | 200 | 700 | 125 | 500 | 3,175 |
| 9 | (England) Rory McLeod | 125 | 500 | 0 | 500 | 700 | 500 | 125 | 500 | 200 | – | 3,150 |
| 10 | (Hong Kong) Ka Wai Cheung | 2,000 | – | 200 | 0 | – | 200 | 500 | 0 | 200 | 0 | 3,100 |
| 11 | (England) Jake Nicholson | – | 2,000 | 0 | 0 | 0 | 500 | 125 | 125 | 125 | 0 | 2,875 |
| 12 | (Wales) Tyler Rees | 200 | 0 | – | – | 125 | – | – | 1,000 | 700 | 500 | 2,525 |
| 13 | (Scotland) Michael Collumb | 0 | 200 | 125 | 0 | 1,000 | 700 | – | 200 | 200 | 0 | 2,425 |
| 14 | (Northern Ireland) Robbie McGuigan | 125 | 500 | 1,000 | 125 | 0 | 0 | 125 | 0 | 500 | 0 | 2,375 |
| 15 | (England) Zak Surety | 500 | 125 | 700 | 125 | 500 | – | – | 125 | 0 | 0 | 2,075 |
| 16 | (England) George Pragnell | 0 | 0 | 700 | 0 | 125 | 200 | 125 | 700 | 0 | 200 | 2,050 |
| 17 | (England) Sanderson Lam | 0 | 200 | 500 | 200 | 200 | 500 | 0 | 200 | 0 | 125 | 1,925 |
| 18 | (Republic of Ireland) Aaron Hill | 500 | 125 | 125 | 1,000 | 0 | 0 | 125 | – | – | – | 1,875 |
| 19 | (England) Paul Davison | 0 | 0 | 125 | 500 | 0 | 125 | 200 | 200 | 500 | 200 | 1,850 |
| 20 | (England) Daniel Womersley | 125 | 125 | 500 | 200 | 125 | 0 | 125 | 125 | 200 | 125 | 1,650 |

Qualified for the main tour through other means
Qualified for the play-offs
Qualified for the main tour

== Tour Playoff ==
The final event, the Challenge Tour Playoff, was held at the English Institute of Sport, Sheffield on 20 July. The event was originally planned for March but was delayed due to the coronavirus pandemic. The event saw the eight highest ranked players, excluding those already qualified for the main tour, compete for a further place on that tour. Ka Wai Cheung chose not to play and was replaced by Tyler Rees. All matches were over 7 frames. The draw was not seeded. The event was won by Allan Taylor, who completed a 4–0 whitewash victory over Adam Duffy.

Quarter-finals; Best of 7 frames
(England) Jake Nicholson | 4
(Wales) Tyler Rees | 2
(England) Oliver Brown | 4
(England) Allan Taylor | 3
(England) Adam Duffy | 4
(England) Patrick Whelan | 0
(Scotland) Dean Young | 1
(England) Rory McLeod | 4

Semi-finals; Best of 7 frames
(England) Jake Nicholson | 1
(England) Allan Taylor | 4
(England) Adam Duffy | 4
(England) Rory McLeod | 1

Final; Best of 7 frames
(England) Allan Taylor | 4
(England) Adam Duffy | 0
