= 2019 Snooker Shoot Out =

2019 BetVictor Snooker Shoot Out
Tournament information
- Dates: 21–24 February 2019
- Venue: Watford Colosseum
- City: Watford
- Country: England
- Organisation: World Snooker
- Format: Ranking event
- Total prize fund: £146,000
- Winner's share: £32,000
- Highest break: Thepchaiya Un-Nooh (THA) (139)

Final
- Champion: Thepchaiya Un-Nooh (THA)
- Runner-up: Michael Holt (ENG)
- Score: 74–0 (one frame)

The 2019 Shoot Out (officially the 2019 BetVictor Snooker Shoot Out) was a professional ranking snooker tournament, taking place from 21 to 24 February 2019 at the Watford Colosseum in Watford, England. It was played under a variation of the standard rules of snooker, and it was the fourteenth ranking event of the 2018/2019 season.

Michael Georgiou was the defending champion, but he lost to Li Hang 28–45 in the second round.

Thepchaiya Un-Nooh won his first career ranking title, beating Michael Holt 74–0 in the final. Un-Nooh's 139 break in the semi-final was the highest in the history of the Shoot Out.

== Tournament format ==
The tournament was played using a variation of the traditional snooker rules. The draw was randomised before each round. All matches were played over a single frame, each of which lasted up to 10 minutes. The event featured a variable shot clock; shots played in the first five minutes were allowed 15 seconds while the final five had a 10-second timer. All foul shots awarded the opponent a ball in hand. Unlike traditional snooker, if a ball did not hit a cushion on every shot, it was a foul. Rather than a coin toss, a lag was used to choose which player breaks. In the event of a draw, each player received a shot at the blue ball this is known as a "blue ball shootout". The player who potted the ball with the cue ball from inside the D and the blue ball on its spot with the opponent missing won the match.

=== Prize fund ===
The breakdown of prize money for this year is shown below:

- Winner: £32,000
- Runner-up: £16,000
- Semi-final: £8,000
- Quarter-final: £4,000
- Last 16: £2,000
- Last 32: £1,000
- Last 64: £500
- Last 128: £250 (prize money at this stage did not count towards the world rankings)
- Highest break: £2,000
- Total: £146,000
- The "rolling 147 prize" for a maximum break: £5,000

== Tournament draw ==
All times in Greenwich Mean Time. Times for quarter-finals, semi-finals and final are approximate. Players in bold denote match winners.
Note: w/d=withdrawn; w/o=walk-over

=== Round 1 ===
==== 21 February – 13:00 ====
- Peter Ebdon (ENG) 37–**67** **Michael Georgiou** (CYP)
- Ashley Carty (ENG) 20–**68** **Steven Hallworth** (ENG)
- **Ricky Walden** (ENG) **136**–1 Liam Davies (WAL)
- Ashley Hugill (ENG) 19–**67** **Ali Carter** (ENG)
- Michael Judge (IRL) 8–**61** **Tom Ford** (ENG)
- **Ben Mertens** (BEL) **60**–59 James Wattana (THA)
- **Kurt Maflin** (NOR) **77**–26 Lee Walker (WAL)
- **Ken Doherty** (IRL) **80**–26 Adam Stefanow (POL)
- **Zhao Xintong** (CHN) **59**–2 Joe O'Connor (ENG)
- **Chen Feilong** (CHN) **58**–34 Lu Ning (CHN)
- Sean O'Sullivan (ENG) 0–**63** **Jamie Clarke** (WAL)
- Joe Perry (ENG) 49–**69** **Rory McLeod** (ENG)
- **Craig Steadman** (ENG) **36**–18 Jordan Brown (NIR)
- **Joe Swail** (NIR) **62**–1 Kuldesh Johal (ENG)
- **Luke Simmonds** (ENG) **73**–15 Zhang Yong (CHN)
- Alfie Burden (ENG) w/d–**w/o** **Thor Chuan Leong** (MAS)

==== 21 February – 19:00 ====
- Ian Burns (ENG) 62–**63** **Kyren Wilson** (ENG)
- Xu Si (CHN) 1–**49** **Billy Castle** (ENG)
- Noppon Saengkham (THA) 5–**34** **Daniel Wells** (WAL)
- Harvey Chandler (ENG) 39–**73** **Gary Wilson** (ENG)
- Zhang Jiankang (CHN) 1–**72** **Jimmy Robertson** (ENG)
- Simon Lichtenberg (GER) 7–**68** **Barry Hawkins** (ENG)
- **Elliot Slessor** (ENG) **41**–7 Duane Jones (WAL)
- Chris Wakelin (ENG) 23–**50** **Oliver Lines** (ENG)
- **Lukas Kleckers** (GER) **64**–0 Jamie O'Neill (ENG)
- James Cahill (ENG) 0–**122** **Mei Xiwen** (CHN)
- Chris Totten (SCO) 21–**48** **Mitchell Mann** (ENG)
- Andrew Higginson (ENG) 19–**74** **Michael White** (WAL)
- Sanderson Lam (ENG) 37–**55** **Alan McManus** (SCO)
- **Sunny Akani** (THA) **94**–0 Lyu Haotian (CHN)
- **Tian Pengfei** (CHN) **88**–52 Andy Lee (HKG)
- Reanne Evans (ENG) 26–**54** **Jimmy White** (ENG)

==== 22 February – 13:00 ====
- Matthew Stevens (WAL) 0–**84** **Stuart Bingham** (ENG)
- Fan Zhengyi (CHN) 2–**23** **Hamza Akbar** (PAK)
- **Jak Jones** (WAL) **78**–13 Liam Graham (SCO)
- **Joel Walker** (ENG) **68**–15 Li Yuan (CHN)
- Hammad Miah (ENG) 18–**70** **Zhang Anda** (CHN)
- **Stephen Bateman** (IRL) **36**–30 Mark Davis (ENG)
- Robbie Williams (ENG) 18–**24** **Ryan Davies** (ENG)
- Ben Hancorn (ENG) 21–**67** **Peter Lines** (ENG)
- **Peter Devlin** (ENG) **35**–16 Ross Muir (SCO)
- **Adam Duffy** (ENG) **27**–19 Mark Joyce (ENG)
- Alexander Ursenbacher (SWI) 16–**57** **Andy Hicks** (ENG)
- **Ben Woollaston** (ENG) **41**–28 Sam Craigie (ENG)
- Zhou Yuelong (CHN) 0–**64** **Michael Holt** (ENG)
- Yuan Sijun (CHN) 18–**57** **Dominic Dale** (WAL)
- Anthony Hamilton (ENG) 0–**95** **David Gilbert** (ENG)
- **Graeme Dott** (SCO) **69**–22 Martin O'Donnell (ENG)

==== 22 February – 19:00 ====
- **Luca Brecel** (BEL) **75**–11 Farakh Ajaib (ENG)
- Yan Bingtao (CHN) 54–**55** **Kishan Hirani** (WAL)
- Emma Parker (ENG) 17–**61** **Laxman Rawat** (IND)
- **Shaun Murphy** (ENG) **52**–12 Mark King (ENG)
- **Thepchaiya Un-Nooh** (THA) **85**–6 Robert Milkins (ENG)
- **Li Hang** (CHN) **33**–19 Fergal O'Brien (IRL)
- Anthony McGill (SCO) 20–**56** **Barry Pinches** (ENG)
- Gerard Greene (NIR) 35–**66** **Matthew Selt** (ENG)
- **Martin Gould** (ENG) **100**–7 Liam Highfield (ENG)
- **John Astley** (ENG) **82**–14 Brandon Sargeant (ENG)
- Luo Honghao (CHN) 12–**35** **Mike Dunn** (ENG)
- Scott Donaldson (SCO) 18–**58** **Allan Taylor** (ENG)
- Stuart Carrington (ENG) 0–**65** **Hossein Vafaei** (IRI)
- **Xiao Guodong** (CHN) **49**–7 Paul Davison (ENG)
- Chen Zifan (CHN) 16–**110** **Sam Baird** (ENG)
- **Rod Lawler** (ENG) **63**–28 Nigel Bond (ENG)

=== Round 2 ===
==== 23 February – 13:00 ====
- Ricky Walden (ENG) 0–**137** **Luca Brecel** (BEL)
- **Ryan Davies** (ENG) **37**–12 Ben Mertens (BEL)
- **Luke Simmonds** (ENG) **25**–10 Hamza Akbar (PAK)
- **Thepchaiya Un-Nooh** (THA) **39**–28 Mei Xiwen (CHN)
- **Sunny Akani** (THA) **62**–25 Billy Castle (ENG)
- Kurt Maflin (NOR) 1–**74** **Gary Wilson** (ENG)
- **Dominic Dale** (WAL) **60**–16 Thor Chuan Leong (MAS)
- Peter Devlin (ENG) 9–**36** **Rory McLeod** (ENG)
- **Kyren Wilson** (ENG) **41**–18 Elliot Slessor (ENG)
- **Jamie Clarke** (WAL) **34**–21 Mitchell Mann (ENG)
- **Daniel Wells** (WAL) **46**–17 Craig Steadman (ENG)
- John Astley (ENG) 18–**32** **Jimmy White** (ENG)
- Joe Swail (NIR) 8–**42** **Mike Dunn** (ENG)
- **Steven Hallworth** (ENG) **120**–8 Tom Ford (ENG)
- Kishan Hirani (WAL) 11–**101** **Laxman Rawat** (IND)
- **Adam Duffy** (ENG) **38**–25 David Gilbert (ENG)

==== 23 February – 19:00 ====
- Shaun Murphy (ENG) 22–**72** **Stuart Bingham** (ENG)
- Matthew Selt (ENG) 6–**51** **Tian Pengfei** (CHN)
- Ben Woollaston (ENG) 44–**51** **Barry Pinches** (ENG)
- Ali Carter (ENG) 13–**61** **Zhao Xintong** (CHN)
- Hossein Vafaei (IRN) 34–**47** **Allan Taylor** (ENG)
- **Michael White** (WAL) **51**–23 Joel Walker (ENG)
- **Oliver Lines** (ENG) **31**–6 Martin Gould (ENG)
- **Alan McManus** (SCO) **43**–33 Jimmy Robertson (ENG)
- Xiao Guodong (CHN) 22–**61** **Graeme Dott** (SCO)
- **Rod Lawler** (ENG) **52**–24 Chen Feilong (CHN)
- Peter Lines (ENG) 13–**17** **Jak Jones** (WAL)
- **Li Hang** (CHN) **45**–28 Michael Georgiou (CYP)
- Stephen Bateman (IRL) 13–**42** **Sam Baird** (ENG)
- Andy Hicks (ENG) 37–**41** **Michael Holt** (ENG)
- Ken Doherty (IRL) 26–**71** **Lukas Kleckers** (GER)
- **Zhang Anda** (CHN) **75**–0 Barry Hawkins (ENG)

=== Round 3 ===
==== 24 February – 13:00 ====
- **Stuart Bingham** (ENG) **68**–5 Kyren Wilson (ENG)
- **Daniel Wells** (WAL) **62**–0 Luke Simmonds (ENG)
- Jimmy White (ENG) 12–**65** **Rory McLeod** (ENG)
- **Jamie Clarke** (WAL) **54**–0 Oliver Lines (ENG)
- **Li Hang** (CHN) **14**–10 Lukas Kleckers (GER)
- **Adam Duffy** (ENG) **29**–12 Alan McManus (SCO)
- **Ryan Davies** (ENG) **10**–7 Sunny Akani (THA)
- Zhao Xintong (CHN) 26–**27** **Luca Brecel** (BEL)
- Laxman Rawat (IND) 6–**55** **Sam Baird** (ENG)
- **Michael White** (WAL) **29**–2 Jak Jones (WAL)
- Barry Pinches (ENG) 5–**15** **Michael Holt** (ENG)
- **Dominic Dale** (WAL) **60**–39 Allan Taylor (ENG)
- Gary Wilson (ENG) 8–**81** **Steven Hallworth** (ENG)
- **Thepchaiya Un-Nooh** (THA) **74**–33 Mike Dunn (ENG)
- Zhang Anda (CHN) 21–**32** **Tian Pengfei** (CHN)
- **Rod Lawler** (ENG) **22**–2 Graeme Dott (SCO)

=== Round 4 ===
==== 24 February – 19:00 ====
- Luca Brecel (BEL) 29–**47** **Michael White** (WAL)
- **Michael Holt** (ENG) **37**–7 Ryan Davies (ENG)
- Adam Duffy (ENG) 9–**54** **Sam Baird** (ENG)
- **Jamie Clarke** (WAL) **36**–32 Steven Hallworth (ENG)
- Tian Pengfei (CHN) 38–**40** **Li Hang** (CHN)
- Rory McLeod (ENG) 15–**58** **Thepchaiya Un-Nooh** (THA)
- Daniel Wells (WAL) 0–**74** **Rod Lawler** (ENG)
- Dominic Dale (WAL) 16–**86** **Stuart Bingham** (ENG)

=== Quarter-finals ===
==== 24 February – 21:00 ====
- **Thepchaiya Un-Nooh** (THA) **97**–3 Stuart Bingham (ENG)
- Li Hang (CHN) 20–**55** **Michael Holt** (ENG)
- Rod Lawler (ENG) 4–**58** **Jamie Clarke** (WAL)
- **Michael White** (WAL) **53**–13 Sam Baird (ENG)

=== Semi-finals ===
==== 24 February – 22:15 ====
- **Thepchaiya Un-Nooh** (THA) **139**–0 Jamie Clarke (WAL)
- Michael White (WAL) 21–**56** **Michael Holt** (ENG)

=== Final ===
Final: 1 frame. Referee: Brendan Moore; Watford Colosseum, Watford, England, 24 February 2019 – 22:45
**Thepchaiya Un-Nooh**; Thailand	**74**–0	Michael Holt; England

== Century breaks ==
Total: 4

- 139 – Thepchaiya Un-Nooh
- 133 – Luca Brecel
- 132 – Ricky Walden
- 100 – Martin Gould
