= 2018 European Masters =

2018 D88.com European Masters

Tournament information
- Dates: 1–7 October 2018
- Venue: De Soeverein
- City: Lommel
- Country: Belgium
- Organisation: World Snooker
- Format: Ranking event
- Total prize fund: £398,500
- Winner's share: £75,000
- Highest break: Jimmy Robertson (ENG) (135); Jack Lisowski (ENG) (135)

Final
- Champion: Jimmy Robertson (ENG)
- Runner-up: Joe Perry (ENG)
- Score: 9–6

The 2018 European Masters (officially the 2018 D88.com European Masters) was a professional ranking snooker tournament, that took place from 1 to 7 October 2018 in Lommel, Belgium. It was the fifth ranking event of the 2018/2019 season.

Qualifying took place on 17 and 18 August 2018 in Preston, England.

Judd Trump was the defending champion after winning the previous two events, but he lost 2–4 to Tian Pengfei in the second round.

Jimmy Robertson reached his first ever ranking event semi-final, which he converted into his first professional ranking event title, beating Joe Perry 9–6 in the final.

== Prize fund ==
The breakdown of prize money for this year is shown below:

- Winner: £75,000
- Runner-up: £35,000
- Semi-final: £17,500
- Quarter-final: £11,000
- Last 16: £6,000
- Last 32: £4,000
- Last 64: £3,000
- Televised highest break: £1,500
- Total: £398,500

The "rolling 147 prize" for a maximum break: £10,000

== Main draw ==
Last 64; Best of 7 frames
(England) Judd Trump	4
(England) Liam Highfield	0
(China) Tian Pengfei	4
(China) Li Hang	3
(Hong Kong) Marco Fu	3
(Republic of Ireland) Fergal O'Brien	4
(China) Liang Wenbo	4
(England) Alfie Burden	3
(England) Oliver Lines	1
(England) Joe Perry	4
(England) Andrew Higginson	4
(Australia) Neil Robertson	2
(Cyprus) Michael Georgiou	2
(England) Allan Taylor	4
(Thailand) Thepchaiya Un-Nooh	1
(England) Kyren Wilson	4
(Scotland) John Higgins	w/d
(Malaysia) Thor Chuan Leong	w/o
(England) Anthony Hamilton	4
(China) Zhang Jiankang	1
(Belgium) Luca Brecel	4
(China) Luo Honghao	2
(China) Yan Bingtao	3
(Scotland) Alan McManus	4
(Wales) Duane Jones	1
(England) Jack Lisowski	4
(England) Peter Lines	4
(England) Paul Davison	0
(China) Zhang Anda	4
(Switzerland) Alexander Ursenbacher	3
(Iran) Hossein Vafaei	w/d
(Israel) Eden Sharav	w/o
(England) Mark Selby	4
(England) Sam Craigie	1
(Scotland) Scott Donaldson	2
(England) Mark Davis	4
(Wales) Ryan Day	4
(China) Yuan Sijun	1
(England) David Gilbert	3
(England) Elliot Slessor	4
(China) Zhao Xintong	1
(England) Mark King	4
(England) Chris Wakelin	1
(England) Stuart Bingham	4
(England) Rory McLeod	1
(England) Ricky Walden	4
(England) Craig Steadman	4
(England) Barry Hawkins	0
(England) Gary Wilson	4
(England) Stuart Carrington	2
(Scotland) Ross Muir	4
(Wales) Lee Walker	2
(Northern Ireland) Mark Allen	4
(England) Ashley Hugill	1
(Wales) Jak Jones	4
(England) Adam Duffy	3
(England) Peter Ebdon	1
(England) Ali Carter	4
(Scotland) Chris Totten	3
(Scotland) Anthony McGill	4
(Republic of Ireland) Ken Doherty	0
(China) Zhou Yuelong	4
(England) Jimmy Robertson	4
(China) Zhang Yong	3

Last 32; Best of 7 frames
(England) Judd Trump	2
(China) Tian Pengfei	4
(Republic of Ireland) Fergal O'Brien	2
(China) Liang Wenbo	4
(England) Joe Perry	4
(England) Andrew Higginson	3
(England) Allan Taylor	2
(England) Kyren Wilson	4
(Malaysia) Thor Chuan Leong	2
(England) Anthony Hamilton	4
(Belgium) Luca Brecel	4
(Scotland) Alan McManus	3
(England) Jack Lisowski	4
(England) Peter Lines	2
(China) Zhang Anda	4
(Israel) Eden Sharav	2
(England) Mark Selby	4
(England) Mark Davis	2
(Wales) Ryan Day	4
(England) Elliot Slessor	3
(England) Mark King	4
(England) Stuart Bingham	0
(England) Ricky Walden	4
(England) Craig Steadman	2
(England) Gary Wilson	2
(Scotland) Ross Muir	4
(Northern Ireland) Mark Allen	4
(Wales) Jak Jones	2
(England) Ali Carter	3
(Scotland) Anthony McGill	4
(China) Zhou Yuelong	3
(England) Jimmy Robertson	4

Last 16; Best of 7 frames
(China) Tian Pengfei	4
(China) Liang Wenbo	2
(England) Joe Perry	4
(England) Kyren Wilson	1
(England) Anthony Hamilton	4
(Belgium) Luca Brecel	3
(England) Jack Lisowski	4
(China) Zhang Anda	2
(England) Mark Selby	2
(Wales) Ryan Day	4
(England) Mark King	4
(England) Ricky Walden	1
(Scotland) Ross Muir	3
(Northern Ireland) Mark Allen	4
(Scotland) Anthony McGill	3
(England) Jimmy Robertson	4

Quarter-finals; Best of 7 frames
(China) Tian Pengfei	3
(England) Joe Perry	4
(England) Anthony Hamilton	4
(England) Jack Lisowski	3
(Wales) Ryan Day	1
(England) Mark King	4
(Northern Ireland) Mark Allen	2
(England) Jimmy Robertson	4

Semi-finals; Best of 11 frames
(England) Joe Perry	6
(England) Anthony Hamilton	3
(England) Mark King	4
(England) Jimmy Robertson	6

Final; Best of 17 frames
(England) Joe Perry	6
(England) Jimmy Robertson	9

== Final ==
Final: Best of 17 frames. Referee: Jan Scheers. De Soeverein, Lommel, Belgium, 7 October 2018.
Joe Perry; England	6–9	Jimmy Robertson; England
Afternoon: 17–69, 21–71, 30–59, 0–79, 37–70, 66–9, 62–33, 64–46; Evening: 52–63, 56–75, 119–0 (106), 138–0, 110–0 (110), 19–68, 4–108 (108)
110	Highest break	108
2	Century breaks	1

== Qualifying ==
These matches were held between 17 and 18 August 2018 at the Preston Guild Hall in Preston, England. All matches were best of 7 frames.

(England) Judd Trump	4–0 (Note: Match was held over and played in Lommel.)	(England) Martin O'Donnell
(England) Liam Highfield	4–1	(England) John Astley
(England) Tom Ford	2–4	(China) Tian Pengfei
(China) Li Hang	4–0	(Thailand) Sunny Akani
(Hong Kong) Marco Fu	4–1	(England) Nigel Bond
(England) Andy Hicks	1–4	(Republic of Ireland) Fergal O'Brien
(China) Liang Wenbo	4–2	(China) Li Yuan
(Northern Ireland) Joe Swail	0–4	(England) Alfie Burden
(England) Oliver Lines	4–2	(England) Matthew Selt
(England) Joe Perry	4–0	(England) Sean O'Sullivan
(Thailand) Dechawat Poomjaeng	2–4	(England) Andrew Higginson
(Australia) Neil Robertson	4–3	(Wales) Dominic Dale
(Cyprus) Michael Georgiou	4–1	(England) Jimmy White
(England) Simon Bedford	2–4	(England) Allan Taylor
(England) Harvey Chandler	2–4	(Thailand) Thepchaiya Un-Nooh
(England) Kyren Wilson	4–2	(Egypt) Basem Eltahhan
(Scotland) John Higgins	4–0	(China) Chen Feilong
(Malaysia) Thor Chuan Leong	4–1	(Thailand) Noppon Saengkham
(England) Anthony Hamilton	4–0	(Finland) Robin Hull
(China) Zhang Jiankang	4–2	(England) Michael Holt
(Belgium) Luca Brecel	4–2	(Wales) Daniel Wells
(China) Niu Zhuang	3–4	(China) Luo Honghao
(China) Yan Bingtao	4–1	(China) Chen Zifan
(Scotland) Alan McManus	4–1	(Iran) Soheil Vahedi
(Wales) Duane Jones	4–2	(England) Mark Joyce
(England) Jack Lisowski	4–1	(Thailand) James Wattana
(England) Billy Joe Castle	2–4	(England) Peter Lines
(Scotland) Stephen Maguire	1–4	(England) Paul Davison
(China) Lyu Haotian	0–4	(China) Zhang Anda
(Wales) Michael White	1–4	(Switzerland) Alexander Ursenbacher
(Iran) Hossein Vafaei	4–2	(England) Rod Lawler
(England) Ronnie O'Sullivan	w/d–w/o	(Israel) Eden Sharav
(England) Mark Selby	4–3	(China) Mei Xiwen
(England) Ashley Carty	1–4	(England) Sam Craigie
(England) Robert Milkins	2–4	(Scotland) Scott Donaldson
(England) Mark Davis	4–2	(England) Sam Baird
(Wales) Ryan Day	4–2	(Pakistan) Hamza Akbar
(China) Yuan Sijun	4–2	(Northern Ireland) Gerard Greene
(England) David Gilbert	4–3	(England) Robbie Williams
(England) Ben Woollaston	0–4	(England) Elliot Slessor
(Wales) Matthew Stevens	1–4	(China) Zhao Xintong
(England) Mark King	4–2	(England) Ian Burns
(England) Joe O'Connor	0–4	(England) Chris Wakelin
(England) Stuart Bingham	4–3	(Wales) Jamie Jones
(England) Rory McLeod	4–3	(Germany) Lukas Kleckers
(England) Ricky Walden	4–3	(England) Hammad Miah
(England) Craig Steadman	4–2	(Poland) Adam Stefanów
(England) Barry Hawkins	4–2	(England) Sanderson Lam
(England) Shaun Murphy	3–4	(England) Gary Wilson
(Wales) Jamie Clarke	1–4	(England) Stuart Carrington
(England) Martin Gould	2–4	(Scotland) Ross Muir
(Wales) Lee Walker	4–0	(China) Fan Zhengyi
(Northern Ireland) Mark Allen	4–3	(England) David Lilley
(England) Ashley Hugill	4–2	(Wales) Kishan Hirani
(Scotland) Graeme Dott	2–4	(Wales) Jak Jones
(Germany) Simon Lichtenberg	0–4	(England) Adam Duffy
(England) Peter Ebdon	4–2	(Northern Ireland) Jordan Brown
(England) Ali Carter	4–2	(China) Xu Si
(England) James Cahill	3–4	(Scotland) Chris Totten
(Scotland) Anthony McGill	4–1	(China) Lu Ning
(Republic of Ireland) Ken Doherty	4–2	(Norway) Kurt Maflin
(China) Zhou Yuelong	4–2	(England) Mike Dunn
(Hong Kong) Andy Lee	3–4	(England) Jimmy Robertson
(Wales) Mark Williams	w/d–w/o	(China) Zhang Yong

== Century breaks ==
=== Main stage centuries ===
Total: 24

- 135, 132, 108 – Jimmy Robertson
- 135, 104 – Jack Lisowski
- 130, 110, 106, 103 – Joe Perry
- 130 – Zhao Xintong
- 129 – Anthony Hamilton
- 124 – Mark King
- 117 – Eden Sharav
- 114 – Judd Trump
- 112, 112 – Tian Pengfei
- 112 – Liang Wenbo
- 110 – Elliot Slessor
- 109 – Luca Brecel
- 108 – Zhang Anda
- 107 – Allan Taylor
- 105 – Ali Carter
- 104 – Anthony McGill
- 100 – David Gilbert

=== Qualifying stage centuries ===
Total: 18

- 142 – Matthew Selt
- 140, 100 – Sam Craigie
- 138 – Elliot Slessor
- 132, 123 – Zhou Yuelong
- 122 – Adam Duffy
- 121 – Thepchaiya Un-Nooh
- 119 – Jack Lisowski
- 118, 102 – Mark Selby
- 116 – Ashley Carty
- 106 – Craig Steadman
- 104 – Peter Ebdon
- 102 – Anthony Hamilton
- 102 – Kishan Hirani
- 100 – Ryan Day
