= Oliver Brown (snooker player) =

English snooker player (born 1994)

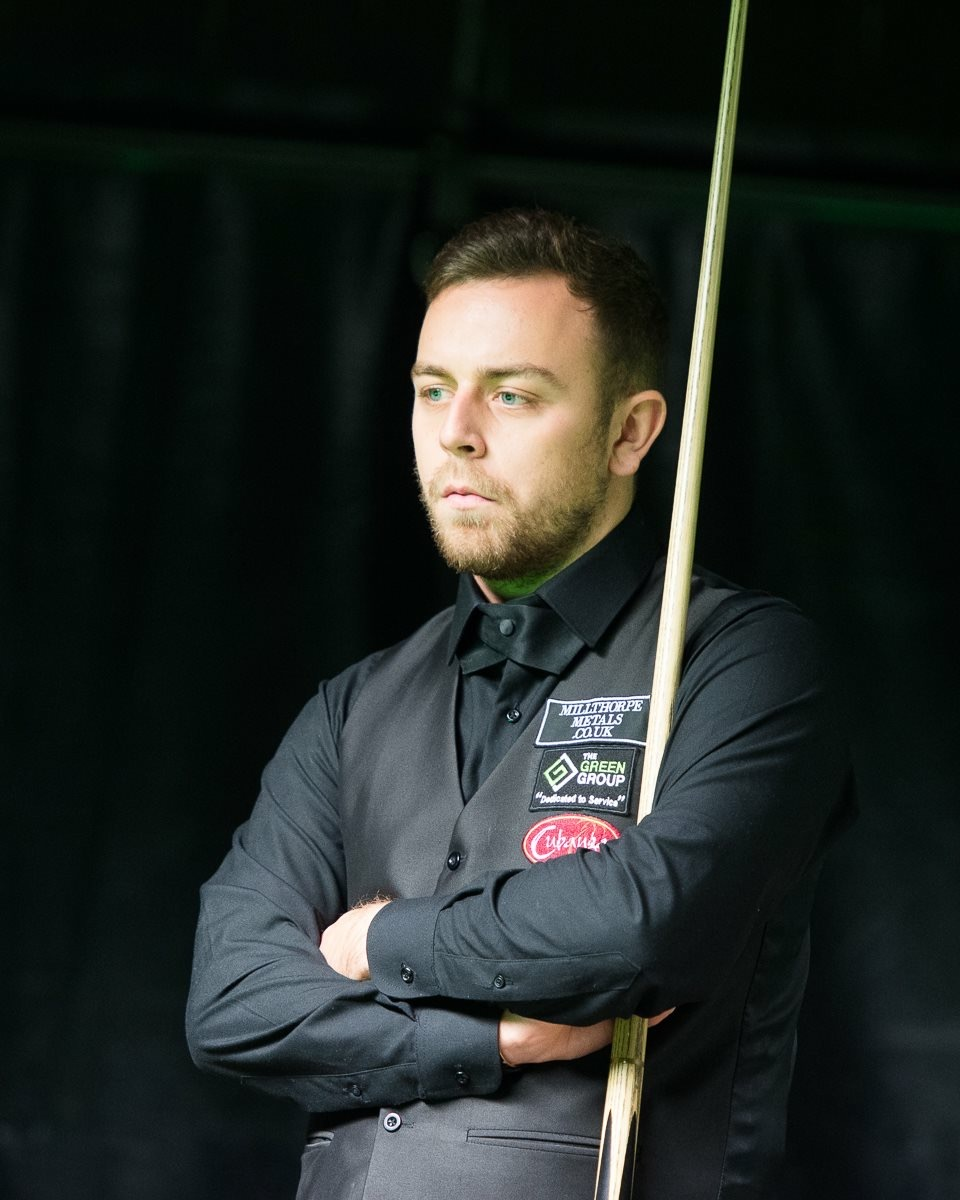
- Brown in 2018

Personal information
- Born: 18 August 1994 (age 32) Dronfield, Derbyshire, England

Sport
- Country: England
- Sport: Snooker
- Professional: 2022–2024, 2025–present
- Highest ranking: 84 (October 2023)
- Current ranking: 102 (as of 7 November 2026)
- Best ranking finish: Last 16 (x1)

Oliver Brown (born 18 August 1994 in Dronfield, Derbyshire) is English professional snooker player. He turned professional at the start of the 2022/2023 season. He earned a two-year tour card after winning the men's EBSA European Snooker Championship in October 2021.

== Career ==
=== 2013/2014 season ===
Brown played in a stage of any ranking event in the first time in the 2013/2014 season. However, he lost in the first qualifying stage of the Australian Open to Joel Walker 5–3. Brown qualified for his first ever ranking tournament's venue stages in October 2013, beating Nigel Bond in the qualifying stage 6–3 in the International Championship. However, he lost in the first round in Chengdu by a 6–4 scoreline to Mark Davis.

=== 2014/2015 season ===
In the first ranking event of the 2014–15 season, Brown was drawn against Chinese snooker star Ding Junhui in the Wuxi Classic. He beat Ding 5–0 in emphatic fashion, qualifying for a second ranking tournament. Brown continued his good form in China, beating Oliver Lines 5–1 in the last 64 stage, before losing to Martin Gould 5–1. Brown entered in the second ranking event of the season, the Australian Goldfields Open. He had to play four qualifying rounds to get to the venue stage. In the end, he beat Andrew Norman 5–3, Dave Harold 5–1 and Gary Wilson 5–3 before losing in the final qualifying round to Tom Ford 5–1.

Brown qualified for the International Championship by beating Jamie Cope and lost 6–1 to Mark Williams in the first round. Brown was drawn against reigning world champion Mark Selby in the first round of the UK Championship and was whitewashed 6–0. At the Welsh Open he beat Mike Dunn 4–3 and home favourite Ryan Day 4–1 to reach the last 32 of a ranking event for the second time this season. Brown suffered a 4–0 defeat against Luca Brecel and his season would come to an end with a heavy 10–1 loss to Liam Highfield in the first round of World Championship qualifying. He entered Q School, but could only win a total of two matches to fall short of earning a place on the tour.

== Performance and rankings timeline ==
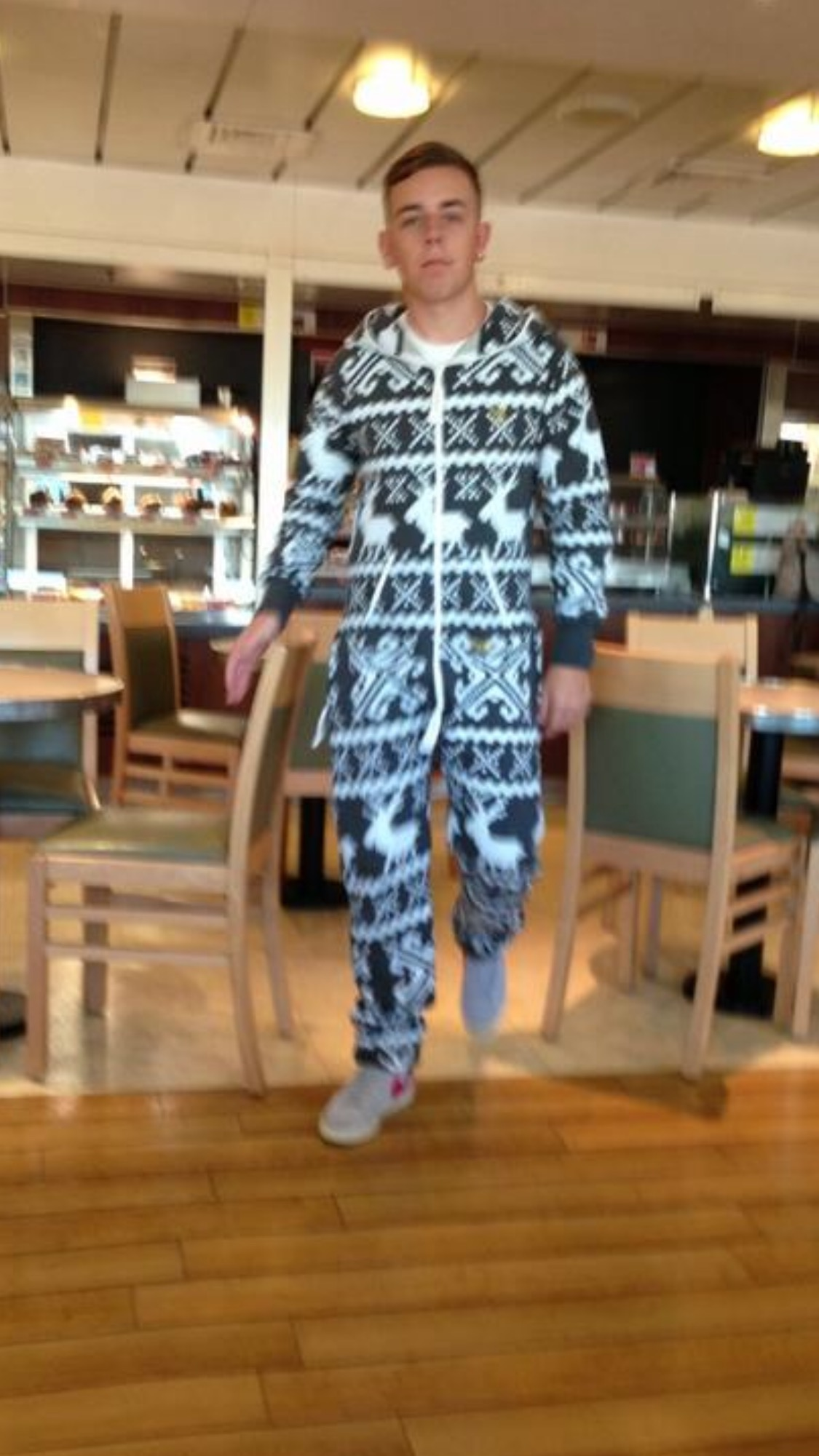
Brown in the early 2010s

Tournament	2010/ 11	2011/ 12	2012/ 13	2013/ 14	2014/ 15	2015/ 16	2016/ 17	2017/ 18	2018/ 19	2019/ 20	2020/ 21	2021/ 22	2022/ 23	2023/ 24	2025/ 26	2026/ 27
Ranking (Note: It shows the ranking at the beginning of the season)	(Note: He was an amateur)												(Note: New players on the Main Tour don't have a ranking)	91		92
Ranking tournaments
Championship League	Non-Ranking Event										RR	RR	RR	RR	RR	RR
China Open	A	A	A	A	LQ	LQ	A	A	A	Tournament Not Held						LQ
Wuhan Open	Tournament Not Held													LQ	LQ	WD
British Open	Tournament Not Held											A	LQ	1R	LQ	LQ
English Open	Tournament Not Held						A	A	A	A	A	A	LQ	1R	LQ	LQ
Shenzhen Open (Note: The event was called the Xi'an Grand Prix (2025/2026))	Tournament Not Held														LQ	LQ
Northern Ireland Open	Tournament Not Held						A	A	A	A	A	A	LQ	LQ	LQ	LQ
International Championship	Not Held		A	1R	1R	A	A	A	A	A	Not Held			LQ	LQ	LQ
UK Championship	A	A	A	A	1R	A	A	A	A	A	A	A	LQ	LQ	LQ	LQ
Shoot Out	Non-Ranking Event						1R	1R	A	A	1R	A	1R	2R	3R	
Scottish Open	Not Held		MR	Not Held			A	A	A	A	A	A	LQ	LQ	LQ	LQ
German Masters	A	A	A	A	LQ	A	A	A	A	A	A	A	LQ	1R	LQ	LQ
Welsh Open	A	A	A	A	3R	A	A	A	A	A	A	A	LQ	LQ	LQ	
World Grand Prix	Tournament Not Held				NR	DNQ	DNQ	DNQ	DNQ	DNQ	DNQ	DNQ	DNQ	DNQ	DNQ	
Players Championship (Note: The event was called the Players Tour Championship Grand Final (2010/2011–2015/2016))	DNQ	DNQ	DNQ	DNQ	DNQ	DNQ	DNQ	DNQ	DNQ	DNQ	DNQ	DNQ	DNQ	DNQ	DNQ	
World Open	A	A	A	A	Not Held		A	A	A	A	Not Held			1R	LQ	
Tour Championship	Tournament Not Held								DNQ	DNQ	DNQ	DNQ	DNQ	DNQ	DNQ	
World Championship	A	A	A	A	LQ	A	A	A	A	LQ	A	A	LQ	LQ	LQ	
Former ranking tournaments
Wuxi Classic	Non-Ranking		A	A	2R	Tournament Not Held										
Australian Goldfields Open	NH	A	A	LQ	LQ	LQ	Tournament Not Held									
Shanghai Masters	A	A	A	A	LQ	A	A	A	Non-Ranking		Not Held			Non-Ranking Event		
Paul Hunter Classic	Minor-Ranking Event						1R	3R	1R	NR	Tournament Not Held					
Indian Open	Not Held			A	LQ	NH	1R	A	A	Tournament Not Held						
Riga Masters (Note: The event was called the Riga Open (2014/2015–2015/2016))	Tournament Not Held				Minor-Ranking		LQ	A	A	A	Tournament Not Held					
WST Pro Series	Tournament Not Held										RR	Tournament Not Held				
Gibraltar Open	Tournament Not Held					MR	LQ	2R	4R	LQ	1R	A	Tournament Not Held			
WST Classic	Tournament Not Held												1R	Not Held		
European Masters	Tournament Not Held						A	A	A	A	A	A	1R	1R	Not Held	
Saudi Arabia Masters	Tournament Not Held														2R	NH
Former non-ranking tournaments
Six-red World Championship	A	NH	A	A	A	A	A	A	A	A	Not Held		LQ	Not Held		

Performance Table Legend
LQ	lost in the qualifying draw	#R	lost in the early rounds of the tournament (WR = Wildcard round, RR = Round robin)	QF	lost in the quarter-finals
SF	lost in the semi-finals	F	lost in the final	W	won the tournament
DNQ	did not qualify for the tournament	A	did not participate in the tournament	WD	withdrew from the tournament

NH / Not Held	means an event was not held.
NR / Non-Ranking Event	means an event is/was no longer a ranking event.
R / Ranking Event	means an event is/was a ranking event.
MR / Minor-Ranking Event	means an event is/was a minor-ranking event.

== Career finals ==
=== Amateur finals: 3 (2 titles) ===
Outcome	No.	Year	Championship	Opponent in the final	Score
Runner-up	1.	2019	Challenge Tour – Event 1	(Hong Kong) Cheung Ka Wai	1–3
Winner	1.	2019	Challenge Tour – Event 6	(England) Ashley Hugill	3–1
Winner	2.	2021	EBSA European Snooker Championship	(Russia) Ivan Kakovskii	5–4
