= Ashley Hugill =

English snooker player

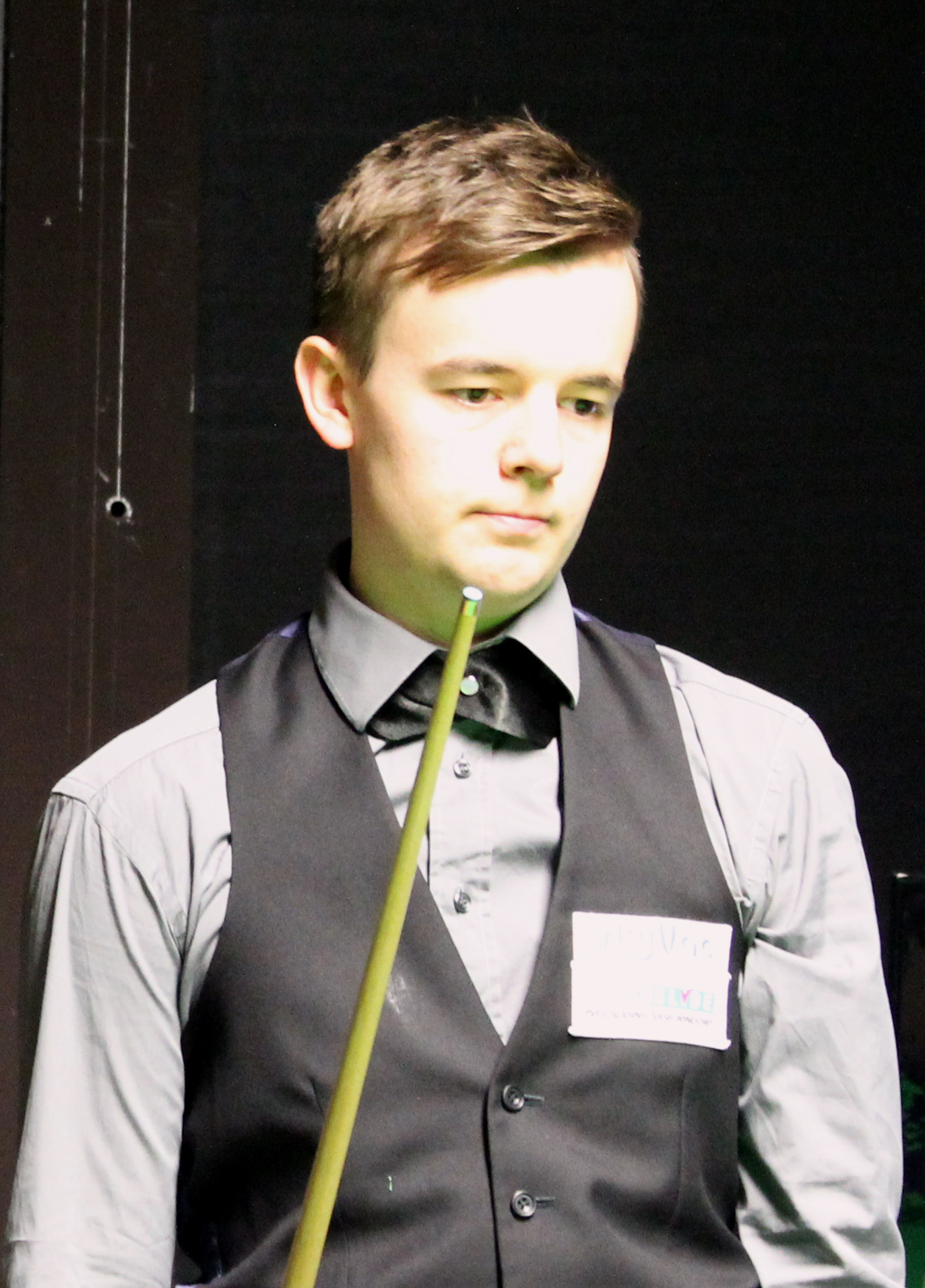
- Paul Hunter Classic 2016

Personal information
- Born: 28 September 1994 (age 32) York, Yorkshire, England

Sport
- Country: England
- Sport: Snooker
- Professional: 2017–2019, 2020–2024, 2026–present
- Highest ranking: 65 (July 2023)
- Current ranking: 108 (as of 7 November 2026)
- Best ranking finish: Quarter-finals (x1)

Ashley Hugill (born 28 September 1994 in York, Yorkshire) is an English professional snooker player.

== Career ==
Hugill came through the 2017 Q School by winning six matches to earn a two-year card on the World Snooker Tour for the 2017–18 and 2018–19 seasons. Hugill made a maximum break during event 3 of the 2019–20 Challenge Tour.

== Performance and rankings timeline ==
Tournament	2015/ 16	2016/ 17	2017/ 18	2018/ 19	2019/ 20	2020/ 21	2021/ 22	2022/ 23	2023/ 24	2025/ 26	2026/ 27
Ranking (Note: It shows the ranking at the beginning of the season)	(Note: He was an amateur)		(Note: New players on the Main Tour don't have a ranking)	82			81	(Note: Players qualified One Year Ranking List started the season without ranking points)	67		
Ranking tournaments
Championship League	Non-Ranking Event					RR	2R	RR	RR	RR	RR
China Open	LQ	1R	LQ	LQ	Tournament Not Held						LQ
Wuhan Open	Tournament Not Held								LQ	A	LQ
British Open	Tournament Not Held						2R	LQ	1R	LQ	LQ
English Open	NH	A	2R	1R	A	1R	LQ	QF	LQ	LQ	2R
Shenzhen Open (Note: The event was called the Xi'an Grand Prix (2025/2026))	Tournament Not Held									A	LQ
Northern Ireland Open	NH	1R	2R	1R	A	1R	LQ	LQ	LQ	2R	LQ
International Championship	LQ	LQ	LQ	LQ	A	Not Held			LQ	A	LQ
UK Championship	1R	A	1R	1R	A	1R	2R	LQ	LQ	LQ	LQ
Shoot Out	NR	3R	3R	1R	2R	WD	1R	2R	1R	1R	
Scottish Open	NH	A	4R	1R	A	2R	LQ	1R	LQ	1R	LQ
German Masters	LQ	A	LQ	LQ	A	LQ	LQ	LQ	LQ	LQ	LQ
Welsh Open	1R	A	1R	1R	A	1R	LQ	LQ	LQ	LQ	
World Grand Prix	DNQ	DNQ	DNQ	DNQ	DNQ	DNQ	DNQ	DNQ	DNQ	DNQ	
Players Championship (Note: The event was called the Players Tour Championship Grand Final (2015/2016))	DNQ	DNQ	DNQ	DNQ	DNQ	DNQ	DNQ	DNQ	DNQ	DNQ	
World Open	NH	LQ	LQ	A	A	Not Held			2R	A	
Tour Championship	Not Held			DNQ	DNQ	DNQ	DNQ	DNQ	DNQ	DNQ	
World Championship	LQ	A	LQ	LQ	LQ	LQ	1R	LQ	LQ	LQ	
Former ranking tournaments
Australian Goldfields Open	LQ	Tournament Not Held									
Shanghai Masters	LQ	A	LQ	Non-Ranking		Not Held			Non-Ranking Event		
Paul Hunter Classic	MR	1R	1R	1R	NR	Tournament Not Held					
Indian Open	NH	1R	1R	LQ	Tournament Not Held						
Riga Masters (Note: The event was called the Riga Open (2015/2016))	MR	LQ	LQ	A	A	Tournament Not Held					
China Championship	NH	NR	LQ	LQ	A	Tournament Not Held					
WST Pro Series	Tournament Not Held					RR	Tournament Not Held				
Turkish Masters	Tournament Not Held						1R	Tournament Not Held			
Gibraltar Open	MR	LQ	1R	2R	4R	1R	2R	Tournament Not Held			
WST Classic	Tournament Not Held							1R	Not Held		
European Masters	NH	LQ	LQ	1R	A	1R	3R	1R	3R	Not Held	
Saudi Arabia Masters	Tournament Not Held									3R	NH
Former non-ranking tournaments
Six-red World Championship	A	A	A	A	A	Not Held		LQ	Not Held		

Performance Table Legend
LQ	lost in the qualifying draw	#R	lost in the early rounds of the tournament (WR = Wildcard round, RR = Round robin)	QF	lost in the quarter-finals
SF	lost in the semi-finals	F	lost in the final	W	won the tournament
DNQ	did not qualify for the tournament	A	did not participate in the tournament	WD	withdrew from the tournament

NH / Not Held	means an event was not held.
NR / Non-Ranking Event	means an event is/was no longer a ranking event.
R / Ranking Event	means an event is/was a ranking event.
MR / Minor-Ranking Event	means an event is/was a minor-ranking event.

== Career finals ==
=== Amateur finals: 4 (3 titles) ===
Outcome	No.	Year	Championship	Opponent in the final	Score
Winner	1.	2019	Challenge Tour - Event 4	(Republic of Ireland) Aaron Hill	3–1
Runner-up	1.	2019	Challenge Tour - Event 6	(England) Oliver Brown	1–3
Winner	2.	2020	WSF Open	(Ukraine) Iulian Boiko	5–3
Winner	3.	2020	Challenge Tour - Event 9	(England) Sydney Wilson	3–1
