= 2019 Q School =

Snooker tournaments

Tournament information
- Dates: 18–23 May, 24–29 May, 30 May–4 June 2019
- Venue: Robin Park Leisure Centre
- City: Wigan
- Country: England
- Organisation: World Snooker
- Format: Qualifying School
- Qualifiers: Xu Si (CHN); David Lilley (ENG); Jamie O'Neill (ENG); Soheil Vahedi (IRN); Chen Zifan (CHN); Riley Parsons (ENG); Louis Heathcote (ENG); Fraser Patrick (SCO); Barry Pinches (ENG); Alex Borg (MLT); Alexander Ursenbacher (SUI); Andy Hicks (ENG)

The 2019 Q School was a series of three snooker tournaments held during the 2019–20 snooker season. An event for amateur players, it served as a qualification event for a place on the professional World Snooker Tour for the following two seasons. The events took place in May and June 2019 at the Robin Park Leisure Centre in Wigan, England. The event was organised by World Snooker, with entries for the event costing £1,000 but with no maximum number of participants.

Each tournament is split into four paths, with the winner of each path being awarded a place on the World Snooker Tour for the 2019–20 season and the 2020–21 snooker season. Twelve players qualified from the events: Chen Zifan, Riley Parsons, Louis Heathcote, Fraser Patrick, Xu Si, David Lilley, Jamie O'Neill, Soheil Vahedi, Barry Pinches, Alex Borg, Alexander Ursenbacher and Andy Hicks. Four more players: Si Jiahui, Billy Joe Castle, Peter Lines and Lei Peifan; were also given tour cards for being at the top of the Order of Merit. The highest break of the events was a 137 made by both Xu Si in event one and Lucky Vatnani in event two.

== Format ==
The Q School is a series of three snooker tournaments, featuring as a qualification route for the World Snooker Tour. First played in 2011, each event consisted of players being randomly assigned to four sections. The 2019 events were played at the Robin Park Leisure Centre in Wigan, England. Each section played in the knockout system with the winner of each section earning a two-year tour card to play on the World Snooker Tour for the 2019–20 snooker season and 2020–21 snooker season. Four more players also received places on the tour based on the Order of Merit, based on the number of frames won over the three events. All matches were played as the best of seven frames. Events had no maximum participants, but entries cost £1,000.

== Event 1 ==
The first event was held between 18 and 23 May. In a six-hour fifth round match, Ashley Hugill required two snookers in the deciding frame. He got the foul points, but still lost the match to Lukas Kleckers on a respotted black. Paul Davison and Soheil Vahedi were tied at 3–3 and was decided on the final black ball, potted by Vahedi. In the final round, David Lilley completed a whitewash over Sean Maddocks to win a tour card for the first time. Xu Si, who had been demoted from the tour the previous season, defeated fellow Chinese player Wang Zepeng 4–2. During the match Xu made the highest break of the tournament, a 137. Jamie O'Neill defeated Kleckers 4–1, whilst Vahedi beat Ross Bulman 4–2.

== Event 2 ==
The second event was held between 24 and 29 May. In the opening round, Lucky Vatnani made the highest break of the event, a 137, but still lost 4–2 to Long Zehuang. The qualification round saw Chen Zifan complete a whitewash 4–0 win over Au Chi-wai from Hong Kong, Riley Parsons defeat Peter Lines 4–3 and Fraser Patrick beat Sydney Watson 4–3. Patrick likened the experience of playing in the event as "every match is like going 12 rounds with Anthony Joshua". In the final qualification match, Si Jiahui led Louis Heathcote 3–0, who also required snookers in frame four and five, but still lost 4–3.

== Event 3 ==
The third and final event was held between 30 May and 4 June. In the qualification round, Barry Pinches defeated Long 4–3, and 1995 World Snooker Championship semi-finalist Andy Hicks defeated Yang Qingtian 4–0. Alex Borg, Malta's second most successful player after Tony Drago, defeated Billy Joe Castle 4–1 and Alexander Ursenbacher beat Peter Lines 4–3. Both Castle and Lines already had enough frames won to qualify for the main tour before these matches occurred. The final two qualification tour cards were awarded to Si Jiahui and Peifan Lei.

== Order of Merit ==
The Order of Merit was awarded to players who won the most frames across the three events who didn't qualify automatically from the events. The top players are shown below, those with Q in brackets were awarded places on the World Snooker Tour.

The Order of Merit also acted as qualification for the 2019–20 Challenge Tour.

Rank	Player	Event 1	Event 2	Event 3	Total
1	(China) Si Jiahui (Q)	17	23	13	53
2	(England) Billy Castle (Q)	14	15	21	50
3	(England) Peter Lines (Q)	3	23	23	49
4	(China) Lei Peifan (Q)	14	18	13	45
5	(Republic of Ireland) Ross Bulman	22	6	16	44
6	(China) Long Zehuang	5	16	23	44
7	(China) Yang Qingtian	12	9	20	41
8	(Germany) Lukas Kleckers	21	8	11	40
9	(Wales) Ian Preece	17	13	10	40
10	(England) Paul Davison	19	7	13	39

== Two-season performance of qualifiers ==
The following table shows the rankings of the 16 qualifiers from the 2019 Q School, at the end of the 2020–21 snooker season, the end of their two guaranteed seasons on the tour, together with their tour status for the 2021–22 snooker season. Players in the top-64 of the rankings retained their place on the tour while those outside the top-64 lost their place unless they qualified under a different category.

Player	End of 2020–21 season		Status for 2021–22 season
Player	Money	Ranking	Status for 2021–22 season
Xu Si (CHN)	44,000	78	Qualified through the one-year list
David Lilley (ENG)	27,000	95	Amateur
Jamie O'Neill (ENG)	37,000	84	Qualified through the one-year list
Soheil Vahedi (IRN)	25,000	99	Amateur
Chen Zifan (CHN)	45,000	76	Qualified through the one-year list
Riley Parsons (ENG)	7,000	121	Amateur
Louis Heathcote (ENG)	69,250	66	Qualified through the one-year list
Fraser Patrick (SCO)	19,500	106	Qualified through the 2021 Q School
Barry Pinches (ENG)	25,000	100	Qualified through the 2021 Q School
Alex Borg (MLT)	5,000	123	Amateur
Alexander Ursenbacher (SUI)	97,250	45	Retained place on tour
Andy Hicks (ENG)	32,500	89	Qualified through the one-year list
Si Jiahui (CHN)	31,500	92	Amateur
Billy Castle (ENG)	17,500	108	Amateur
Peter Lines (ENG)	28,000	93	Qualified through the 2021 Q School
Lei Peifan (CHN)	23,500	101	Qualified through the 2021 Q School
