= 2019–20 snooker season =

Series of snooker tournaments

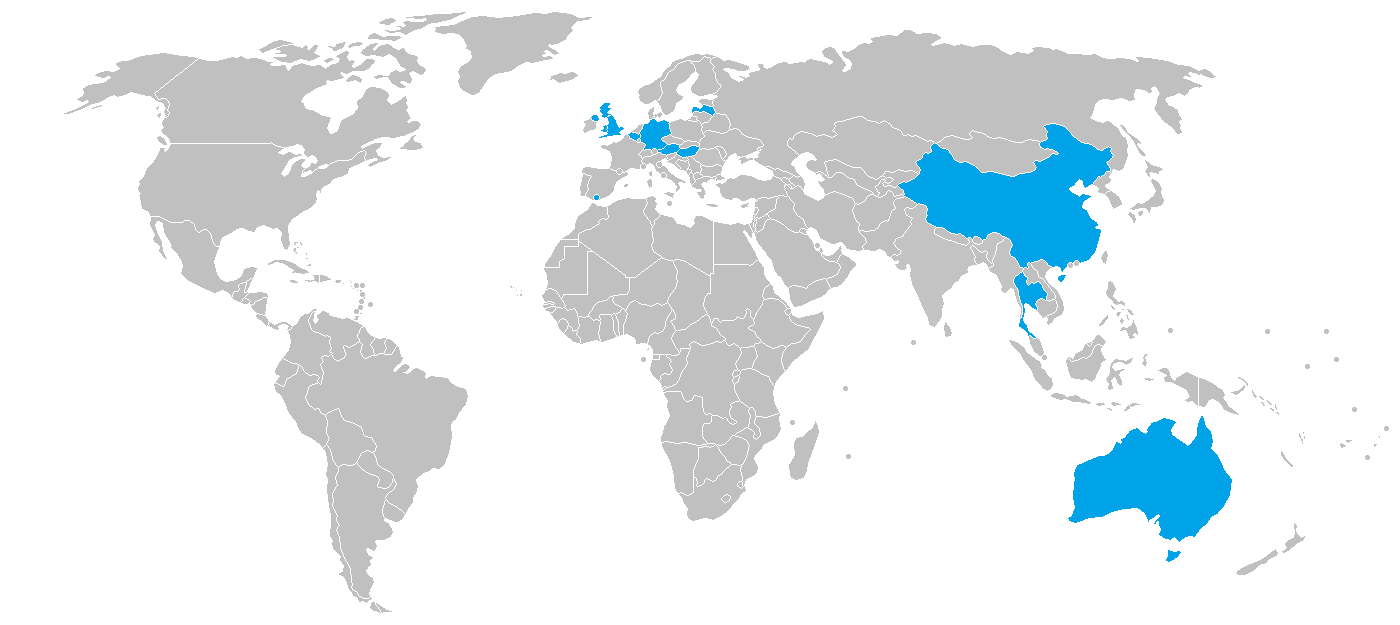
- Nations that hosted an event in the snooker calendar during the 2019–20 season

Details
- Duration: 9 May 2019 – 22 August 2020
- Tournaments: 47 (17 ranking events)

Triple Crown winners
- UK Championship: Ding Junhui (CHN)
- Masters: Stuart Bingham (ENG)
- World Championship: Ronnie O'Sullivan (ENG)

The 2019–20 snooker season was a series of professional snooker tournaments played between 9 May 2019 and 22 August 2020. In total, 47 events were held during the season: however, the ending of the season was highly disrupted by the COVID-19 pandemic. 18 world ranking tournaments were planned to take place, but only 17 were played. An event was held in Austria, the first time in any snooker season, while the 2020 China Open was cancelled. The Tour Championship and the World Snooker Championship were postponed, and the Gibraltar Open played with no audience. The season contained 128 professional tour players, 35 of which had been given new two-year places on the tour from a combination of invitations and qualifying events.

Judd Trump, the reigning world champion, won a record six ranking titles for a season. Trump also became the second player ever to compile over 100 century breaks in a season. Ronnie O'Sullivan won the 2020 World Snooker Championship, defeating Kyren Wilson with a score of 18–8. By doing so O'Sullivan also won his 37th ranking title, the most of any player. The other Triple Crown championships were the 2019 UK Championship, won by Ding Junhui, and the 2020 Masters, won by Stuart Bingham.

== Players ==
The World Snooker Tour in the 2019–20 season consisted of a field of 128 professional players. The highest 64 players on the 2018–19 snooker world rankings after the 2019 World Championship qualified for a place in the field, whilst an additional 29 players who had previously won a two-year tour card also qualified. Eight places were also given to players who were highest on the one-year ranking list, but had not already qualified after the previous tour.

The remaining places were offered by means of invitation and by competing in qualifying events. Three players came from the Challenge Tour, two players came from the CBSA China Tour, and sixteen places were available through the Q School events. The four remaining places were given to continental championship winners, whilst Amine Amiri won the African Billiards & Snooker Confederation's nomination, and an invitational offer was given to longstanding tour player Jimmy White. The following players received a tour card for two seasons:

=== New professional players ===
One Year Ranking List

1. Eden Sharav (ISR)
2. James Cahill (ENG)
3. Ian Burns (ENG)
4. Duane Jones (WAL)
5. Dominic Dale (WAL)
6. Gerard Greene (NIR)
7. Rod Lawler (ENG)
8. Nigel Bond (ENG)

International champions

9. EBSA European winner: Kacper Filipiak (POL)
10. EBSA European Under-21 winner: Jackson Page (WAL)
11. Oceania Championship winner: Steve Mifsud (AUS)
12. Pan-American Championship winner: Igor Figueiredo (BRA)

African Billiards & Snooker Confederation nomination

13. Amine Amiri (MAR)

CBSA China Tour

14. Chang Bingyu (CHN)
15. Bai Langning (CHN)

Challenge Tour

Main article: 2018–19 Challenge Tour
16. Brandon Sargeant (ENG)
17. David Grace (ENG)
18. Mitchell Mann (ENG)

Invitational Tour Card

19. Jimmy White (ENG)

Q School

Main article: 2019 Q School

Event 1

20. Xu Si (CHN)
21. David Lilley (ENG)
22. Jamie O'Neill (ENG)
23. Soheil Vahedi (IRN)

Event 2

24. Chen Zifan (CHN)
25. Riley Parsons (ENG)
26. Louis Heathcote (ENG)
27. Fraser Patrick (SCO)

Event 3

28. Barry Pinches (ENG)
29. Alex Borg (MLT)
30. Alexander Ursenbacher (SUI)
31. Andy Hicks (ENG)

Q School Order of Merit

32. Si Jiahui (CHN)
33. Billy Castle (ENG)
34. Peter Lines (ENG)
35. Lei Peifan (CHN)

== Season summary ==
The season consisted of a series of different tours. The main tour was the World Snooker Tour, consisting of events that carried both world ranking and invitational points.

=== Ranking events ===
The opening ranking event was the Riga Masters, where Mark Joyce and Yan Bingtao reached the finals, both of whom had not won a ranking event prior. Bingtao won the event, the first teenager to win a ranking event since the 2006 Northern Ireland Trophy. Shaun Murphy reached the final in both of the next two ranking tournaments, losing 3–10 to reigning world champion Judd Trump in the International Championship, but winning the China Championship on a deciding frame 10–9 over Mark Williams. The first of four Home Nations Series events, was won by Mark Selby, defeating David Gilbert 9–1 at the English Open. The next two events were won by Trump, who won the World Open and the Northern Ireland Open. The first of the Triple Crown tournament events—the UK Championship—was held between November and December. Both finalists had won the event before, but neither for over 10 years, with Ding Junhui defeating Stephen Maguire to win the title for the third time. The final ranking event of the year was the Scottish Open, held in December, the third Home Nations event. This event was also won by Selby, who defeated Jack Lisowski with a score of 9–6.

The first ranking event held in 2020 was the European Masters in Austria. This was the first ranking event held in the country. The event was won by Neil Robertson, who completed a whitewash 9–0 victory against Zhou Yuelong. This was the first multisession final whitewash since the 1989 Grand Prix. Robertson also appeared in the final of the next two events, losing to Trump 6–9 in the German Masters, but winning the World Grand Prix 10–8 over Graeme Dott. Murphy won his second title of the season at the Welsh Open, defeating Kyren Wilson 9–1. The one-frame timed Snooker Shoot Out was won by Michael Holt, his first championship in his 24-year career. Having won four events already in the season, Trump won the Players Championship with a score of 10–4 over Yan and Gibraltar Open with a score of 4–3 over Wilson. Trump's six ranking event wins became the most made by one player in the history of the World Snooker Tour. Due to the COVID-19 pandemic, the Gibraltar Open was played without a live audience in attendance after the first day, and subsequent events were played without fans. The China Open was cancelled due to restrictions. The Tour Championship, scheduled for March, was postponed, and was played in June. It was won by Maguire, his first title in seven years. Maguire only qualified for the event after Ding withdrew. The final ranking event and third Triple Crown event of the season was the World Snooker Championship, held in July and August. Used as a trial event for the UK Government, it was originally planned for spectators to be present, but this was revoked after the first day, with audiences also allowed for the final. The championship was won by Ronnie O'Sullivan, defeating Wilson 18–8 in the final. This gave O'Sullivan his sixth world title.

Trump was named World Snooker Player of the Year, Fans' Player of the Year, and Snooker Journalists' Player of the Year. Trump also became the second player ever to compile one hundred century breaks in a season. O'Sullivan received the Performance of the Year award for winning his sixth world title and record breaking 37th ranking title. Louis Heathcote was named Rookie of the Year, whilst Higgins' maximum break at the world championship was named The Magic Moment of the Year.

=== Other events ===
The season began with a series of three pro–am tournaments. The Vienna Open was won by Mark Joyce, with the Pink Ribbon being won by Bingham. The World Cup team event was won by Higgins and Maguire representing Scotland. The 2019 Paul Hunter Classic was won by Barry Hawkins over Wilson with a score of 4–3. The 2019 Six-red World Championship, a six-red snooker variant tournament, was won by Maguire, defeating his World Cup winning partner Higgins with a score of 8–6. The 2019 Shanghai Masters was won by O'Sullivan, retaining the championship he won in 2017 and 2018. The Haining Open Chinese pro-am event was won by Thepchaiya Un-Nooh.

The Champion of Champions tournament, with participants being winners of events from the prior 12 months, was won by Robertson, who defeated Trump 10–9 in the final. The second Triple Crown event, the 2020 Masters was won by Bingham, who defeated Ali Carter in the final with a score of 10–8. Carter had not qualified for the event, but was given the place after defending champion O'Sullivan withdrew. The year-long Championship League event was won by Scott Donaldson, with a second Championship League organised as a test event for returning to play after the lockdown. The second event was won by Luca Brecel. A series 10 of Challenge Tour events were held for players not on the main tour, which culminated in a Challenge Tour play-off, won by Allan Taylor over Adam Duffy 4–0.

== Calendar ==
The following tables outline the dates and results for all the World Snooker Tour, World Women's Snooker Tour, World Seniors Tour, Challenge Tour, and other events in the season.

=== World Snooker Tour ===
Start	Finish	Tournament	Venue	Winner	Score	Runner-up	Ref.
24 Jun	30 Jun	World Cup†	Wuxi City Sports Park Stadium in Wuxi, China	Scotland	4‍–‍0	China B	
26 Jul	28 Jul	Riga Masters	Arēna Rīga in Riga, Latvia	Yan Bingtao (CHN)	5‍–‍2	Mark Joyce (ENG)	
4 Aug	11 Aug	International Championship	Baihu Media Broadcasting Centre in Daqing, China	Judd Trump (ENG)	10‍–‍3	Shaun Murphy (ENG)	
24 Aug	25 Aug	Paul Hunter Classic†	Stadthalle in Fürth, Germany	Barry Hawkins (ENG)	4‍–‍3	Kyren Wilson (ENG)	
2 Sep	7 Sep	Six-red World Championship†	Bangkok Convention Center in Bangkok, Thailand	Stephen Maguire (SCO)	8‍–‍6	John Higgins (SCO)	
9 Sep	15 Sep	Shanghai Masters†	Regal International East Asia Hotel in Shanghai, China	Ronnie O'Sullivan (ENG)	11‍–‍9	Shaun Murphy (ENG)	
23 Sep	29 Sep	China Championship	Guangzhou Tianhe Sports Centre in Guangzhou, China	Shaun Murphy (ENG)	10‍–‍9	Mark Williams (WAL)	
14 Oct	20 Oct	English Open	K2 in Crawley, England	Mark Selby (ENG)	9‍–‍1	David Gilbert (ENG)	
28 Oct	3 Nov	World Open	Yushan Sport Centre in Yushan, China	Judd Trump (ENG)	10‍–‍5	Thepchaiya Un-Nooh (THA)	
4 Nov	10 Nov	Champion of Champions†	Ricoh Arena in Coventry, England	Neil Robertson (AUS)	10‍–‍9	Judd Trump (ENG)	
11 Nov	17 Nov	Northern Ireland Open	Waterfront Hall in Belfast, Northern Ireland	Judd Trump (ENG)	9‍–‍7	Ronnie O'Sullivan (ENG)	
26 Nov	8 Dec	UK Championship	Barbican Centre in York, England	Ding Junhui (CHN)	10‍–‍6	Stephen Maguire (SCO)	
9 Dec	15 Dec	Scottish Open	Emirates Arena in Glasgow, Scotland	Mark Selby (ENG)	9‍–‍6	Jack Lisowski (ENG)	
12 Jan	19 Jan	Masters†	Alexandra Palace in London, England	Stuart Bingham (ENG)	10‍–‍8	Ali Carter (ENG)	
22 Jan	26 Jan	European Masters	Messe Dornbirn in Dornbirn, Austria	Neil Robertson (AUS)	9‍–‍0	Zhou Yuelong (CHN)	
29 Jan	2 Feb	German Masters	Tempodrom in Berlin, Germany	Judd Trump (ENG)	9‍–‍6	Neil Robertson (AUS)	
3 Feb	9 Feb	World Grand Prix	The Centaur in Cheltenham, England	Neil Robertson (AUS)	10‍–‍8	Graeme Dott (SCO)	
10 Feb	16 Feb	Welsh Open	Motorpoint Arena in Cardiff, Wales	Shaun Murphy (ENG)	9‍–‍1	Kyren Wilson (ENG)	
20 Feb	23 Feb	Shoot Out	Watford Colosseum in Watford, England	Michael Holt (ENG)	1‍–‍0	Zhou Yuelong (CHN)	
24 Feb	1 Mar	Players Championship	Waterfront in Southport, England	Judd Trump (ENG)	10‍–‍4	Yan Bingtao (CHN)	
7 Oct	5 Mar	Championship League†	Morningside Arena in Leicester, England	Scott Donaldson (SCO)	3‍–‍0	Graeme Dott (SCO)	
13 Mar	15 Mar	Gibraltar Open	Europa Point Sports Complex in Gibraltar, Gibraltar	Judd Trump (ENG)	4‍–‍3	Kyren Wilson (ENG)	
1 Jun	11 Jun	Championship League†	Marshall Arena in Milton Keynes, England	Luca Brecel (BEL)	R‍–‍R	Ben Woollaston (ENG)	
20 Jun	26 Jun	Tour Championship	Marshall Arena in Milton Keynes, England	Stephen Maguire (SCO)	10‍–‍6	Mark Allen (NIR)	
31 Jul	16 Aug	World Championship	Crucible Theatre in Sheffield, England	Ronnie O'Sullivan (ENG)	18‍–‍8	Kyren Wilson (ENG)	

Ranking event
† Non-ranking event

Inaugural European Series champion and Betvictor bonus winner: Judd Trump (ENG)

=== World Women's Snooker ===
Start	Finish	Tournament	Venue	Winner	Score	Runner-up	Ref.
17 Aug		Women's Tour Championship	Crucible Theatre in Sheffield, England	Reanne Evans (ENG)	1‍–‍0	Ng On-Yee (HKG)	
14 Sep	15 Sep	UK Women's Championship	Northern Snooker Centre in Leeds, England	Reanne Evans (ENG)	4‍–‍2	Maria Catalano (ENG)	
17 Oct	20 Oct	Australian Women's Open	Mounties in Sydney, Australia	Nutcharut Wongharuthai (THA)	4‍–‍2	Ng On-Yee (HKG)	
23 Nov	24 Nov	Eden Women's Masters	Frames Sports Bar in Coulsdon, England	Reanne Evans (ENG)	4‍–‍2	Ng On-Yee (HKG)	
31 Jan	2 Feb	Belgian Women's Open	The Trickshot in Bruges, Belgium	Ng On-yee (HKG)	4‍–‍2	Reanne Evans (ENG)	

=== World Seniors Tour ===
Start	Finish	Tournament	Venue	Winner	Score	Runner-up	Ref.
15 Aug	18 Aug	World Seniors Championship	Crucible Theatre in Sheffield, England	Jimmy White (ENG)	5‍–‍3	Darren Morgan (WAL)	
24 Oct	25 Oct	UK Seniors Championship	Hull Venue in Hull, England	Michael Judge (IRL)	4‍–‍2	Jimmy White (ENG)	
19 Aug	22 Aug	World Seniors Championship	Crucible Theatre in Sheffield, England	Jimmy White (ENG)	5‍–‍4	Ken Doherty (IRL)	

=== Challenge Tour ===
Start	Finish	Tournament	Venue	Winner	Score	Runner-up	Ref.
31 Aug	1 Sep	Challenge Tour 1	Ballroom Nürnberg in Nuremberg, Germany	Cheung Ka Wai (HKG)	3‍–‍1	Oliver Brown (ENG)	
21 Sep	22 Sep	Challenge Tour 2	The Crucible Sports & Social Club in Newbury, England	Jake Nicholson (ENG)	3‍–‍1	Andrew Pagett (WAL)	
5 Oct	6 Oct	Challenge Tour 3	Northern Snooker Centre in Leeds, England	Andrew Pagett (WAL)	3‍–‍0	Robbie McGuigan (NIR)	
19 Oct	20 Oct	Challenge Tour 4	The Trickshot in Bruges, Belgium	Ashley Hugill (ENG)	3‍–‍1	Aaron Hill (IRL)	
16 Nov	17 Nov	Challenge Tour 6	Hungary Snooker Academy in Budapest, Hungary	Oliver Brown (ENG)	3‍–‍1	Ashley Hugill (ENG)	
14 Dec	15 Dec	Challenge Tour 7	De Maxx in Pelt, Belgium	Dean Young (SCO)	3‍–‍1	Andrew Pagett (WAL)	
18 Jan	19 Jan	Challenge Tour 8	Tamworth Sports Bar in Tamworth, England	Lukas Kleckers (GER)	3‍–‍1	Tyler Rees (WAL)	
15 Feb	16 Feb	Challenge Tour 9	Terry Griffiths Matchroom in Llanelli, Wales	Ashley Hugill (ENG)	3‍–‍1	Sydney Wilson (ENG)	
28 Feb	29 Feb	Challenge Tour 5	The Winchester in Leicester, England	Allan Taylor (ENG)	3‍–‍1	Michael Collumb (SCO)	
1 Mar	2 Mar	Challenge Tour 10	The Winchester in Leicester, England	Adam Duffy (ENG)	3‍–‍1	Kuldesh Johal (ENG)	
20 Jul		Challenge Tour Playoffs	English Institute of Sport in Sheffield, England	Allan Taylor (ENG)	4‍–‍0	Adam Duffy (ENG)	

=== Other events ===
Start	Finish	Tournament	Venue	Winner	Score	Runner-up	Ref.
9 May	12 May	Vienna Open	15 Reds Köö Wien Snooker Club in Vienna, Austria	Mark Joyce (ENG)	5‍–‍4	Mark King (ENG)	
20 Jul	23 Jul	Pink Ribbon	South West Snooker Academy in Gloucester, England	Stuart Bingham (ENG)	4‍–‍3	Mark Allen (NIR)	
29 Aug	1 Sep	Independence Day Cup	Lider BK in Kyiv, Ukraine	Craig Steadman (ENG)	4‍–‍0	Mateusz Baranowski (POL)	
22 Oct	26 Oct	Haining Open	Haining Sports Center in Haining, China	Thepchaiya Un-Nooh (THA)	5‍–‍3	Li Hang (CHN)	

== World ranking points ==
The 2019–20 snooker season featured the following points distribution for World Snooker Tour ranking events:

Round Tournament	R144	R128	R112	R80	R64	R48	R32	R16	QF	SF	F	W
Riga Masters	—N/a	£0	—N/a	—N/a	£2,000	—N/a	£3,000	£4,000	£6,000	£15,000	£25,000	£50,000
International Championship	—N/a	£0	—N/a	—N/a	£4,750	—N/a	£8,500	£13,500	£21,500	£32,000	£75,000	£175,000
China Championship	—N/a	£0	—N/a	—N/a	£4,750	—N/a	£7,500	£13,000	£20,000	£32,000	£75,000	£150,000
English Open	—N/a	£0	—N/a	—N/a	£3,000	—N/a	£4,000	£7,500	£10,000	£20,000	£30,000	£70,000
World Open	—N/a	£0	—N/a	—N/a	£5,000	—N/a	£8,000	£13,500	£20,000	£32,500	£75,000	£150,000
Northern Ireland Open	—N/a	£0	—N/a	—N/a	£3,000	—N/a	£4,000	£7,500	£10,000	£20,000	£30,000	£70,000
UK Championship	—N/a	£0	—N/a	—N/a	£6,500	—N/a	£12,000	£17,000	£24,500	£40,000	£80,000	£200,000
Scottish Open	—N/a	£0	—N/a	—N/a	£3,000	—N/a	£4,000	£7,500	£10,000	£20,000	£30,000	£70,000
European Masters	—N/a	£0	—N/a	—N/a	£3,000	—N/a	£4,000	£6,000	£11,000	£17,500	£35,000	£80,000
German Masters	—N/a	£0	—N/a	—N/a	£3,000	—N/a	£4,000	£5,000	£10,000	£20,000	£35,000	£80,000
World Grand Prix	—N/a	—N/a	—N/a	—N/a	—N/a	—N/a	£5,000 (Note: First-round losers in the Shoot Out, Coral World Grand Prix, Coral Players Championship and Coral Tour Championship received their prize money in full, however this money did not count towards the prize money rankings.)	£7,500	£12,500	£20,000	£40,000	£100,000
Welsh Open	—N/a	£0	—N/a	—N/a	£3,000	—N/a	£4,000	£7,500	£10,000	£20,000	£30,000	£70,000
Shoot Out	—N/a	£250	—N/a	—N/a	£500	—N/a	£1,000	£2,000	£4,000	£8,000	£20,000	£50,000
Players Championship	—N/a	—N/a	—N/a	—N/a	—N/a	—N/a	—N/a	£10,000	£15,000	£30,000	£50,000	£125,000
Gibraltar Open	—N/a	£0	—N/a	—N/a	£2,000	—N/a	£3,000	£4,000	£5,000	£6,000	£20,000	£50,000
Tour Championship	—N/a	—N/a	—N/a	—N/a	—N/a	—N/a	—N/a	—N/a	£20,000	£40,000	£60,000	£150,000
World Championship	£0	—N/a	£5,000 (Note: Players who lost their first match received no ranking points.)	£10,000	—N/a	£15,000	£20,000	£30,000	£50,000	£100,000	£200,000	£500,000
