= Riga Masters (snooker) =

Snooker tournament held in Latvia

Tournament information
- Venue: Arena Riga
- Location: Riga
- Country: Latvia
- Established: 2014
- Organisation(s): World Professional Billiards and Snooker Association
- Format: Ranking event
- Total prize fund: £278,000
- Final year: 2019
- Final champion: (China) Yan Bingtao

The Riga Masters or Riga Open until 2016 (also known as the Kaspersky Riga Masters for sponsorship reasons) was a professional ranking snooker tournament. The tournament started in 2014 as a part of the Players Tour Championship and was staged at the Arena Riga in Riga, Latvia. It was the opening ranking event of the season after becoming a ranking event in 2016, until 2019. Yan Bingtao, banned from the World Snooker Tour until December 2027, remains the defending champion having defeated Mark Joyce in the 2019 edition.

== Winners ==
Year	Winner	Runner-up	Final score	Season
Riga Open (minor-ranking)
2014	(England) Mark Selby	(Northern Ireland) Mark Allen	4–3	2014–15
2015	(England) Barry Hawkins	(England) Tom Ford	4–1	2015–16
Riga Masters (ranking)
2016	(Australia) Neil Robertson	(England) Michael Holt	5–2	2016–17
2017	(Wales) Ryan Day	(Scotland) Stephen Maguire	5–2	2017–18
2018	(Australia) Neil Robertson	(England) Jack Lisowski	5–2	2018–19
2019	(China) Yan Bingtao	(England) Mark Joyce	5–2	2019–20
