= European Series =

Snooker tournament series

Tournament information
- Country: Various European countries (majority within United Kingdom, Germany, and Gibraltar)
- Established: 2019
- Organisation(s): World Snooker Tour
- Format: 8 ranking events
- Total prize fund: £150,000
- Final year: 2024
- Final champion: Judd Trump (ENG)

The European Series (as BetVictor European Series or simply BetVictor Series due to sponsorship reasons) was a snooker tournament series established in 2019. It was expanded from four tournaments in the 2019–20 season to six tournaments in the 2020–21 season and then to eight tournaments from the 2021–22 season. The player who wins the most cumulative prize money in European Series events each season receives a bonus prize of £150,000; Judd Trump won the bonus prize in the first two and the fifth seasons, while John Higgins took the bonus in the third season, and Robert Milkins claimed it in the fourth. It was discontinued as the European Masters was dropped for the 2024-25 season, and the BetVictor Bonus was awarded to the player who earned the most across the Home Nations Series instead.

== Events ==
The BetVictor European Series was established in 2019, and initially consisted of four tournaments: European Masters, German Masters, Shoot Out, and Gibraltar Open.

For the 2020–21 season, the Championship League and Welsh Open were included.

For the 2021–22 season, the other three Home Nations Series events (Northern Ireland Open, English Open, Scottish Open) were added, while the Championship League was removed, bringing the total number of events in the series to eight.

For the 2022–23 season, the European Series has been renamed to the BetVictor Series. The Championship League has been re-added to the series, whereas the Gibraltar Open has been removed.

The series' sponsor, BetVictor, downsized its sponsorship for the 2024-25 season, leaving only the Home Nations Series events and the Championship League to its name, but retained the BetVictor Bonus prize for the best-performing player across the Home Nation Series. Snooker Shoot Out was taken up by 9club, another online gambling platform; German Masters by Machineseeker, in which the European Series title can still be seen on WST's promotional material; whereas the European Masters was discontinued since.

== Series winners ==
In the first two years of the bonus being awarded, Judd Trump was the only player to collect it. He won the series in the 2019–20 season after winning the 2020 Gibraltar Open in March, and then again in the 2020–21 season after Mark Selby, the only other contender to win the series at the time, lost in the third round of the 2021 Gibraltar Open.

In the 2021–22 season, eleven players remained in contention for the bonus at the outset of the series' final tournament, the 2022 Gibraltar Open. John Higgins was top of the list, ahead of Mark Allen on countback. Higgins won the £150,000 prize after the last remaining contender Ricky Walden, who needed to win the tournament to claim the bonus, lost in the semi-finals.

Eleven players were also in contention for the bonus in the 2022–23 snooker season at the outset of the series' final event, the 2023 Welsh Open. Robert Milkins won the series by winning the tournament, edging over Ali Carter who was the series' leader at the beginning of the tournament.

In the 2023–24 season, Judd Trump claimed the bonus for a third time with an event, the 2024 Welsh Open to spare, as he won the 2023 English and Northern Ireland Opens, as well as the 2024 German Masters, and was the runner-up of the 2023 European Masters.

Season	Winner	Bonus prize	Ref.
2019–20	Judd Trump (ENG)	£150,000	
2020–21	Judd Trump (ENG)	£150,000	
2021–22	John Higgins (SCO)	£150,000	
2022–23	Robert Milkins (ENG)	£150,000	
2023–24	Judd Trump (ENG)	£150,000	
Bonus awarded to the Home Nation Series winner from the 2024-25 season

== Results ==
Season	Tournament	City	Winner	Score	Runner-up
2019–20	European Masters	Dornbirn	Neil Robertson (AUS)	9–0	Zhou Yuelong (CHN)
2019–20	German Masters	Berlin	Judd Trump (ENG)	9–6	Neil Robertson (AUS)
2019–20	Shoot Out	Watford	Michael Holt (ENG)	1–0 (64–1)	Zhou Yuelong (CHN)
2019–20	Gibraltar Open	Gibraltar	Judd Trump (ENG)	4–3	Kyren Wilson (ENG)
2020–21	European Masters	Milton Keynes	Mark Selby (ENG)	9–8	Martin Gould (ENG)
2020–21	Championship League	Milton Keynes	Kyren Wilson (ENG)	3–1	Judd Trump (ENG)
2020–21	German Masters	Milton Keynes	Judd Trump (ENG)	9–2	Jack Lisowski (ENG)
2020–21	Shoot Out	Milton Keynes	Ryan Day (WAL)	1–0 (67–24)	Mark Selby (ENG)
2020–21	Welsh Open	Newport	Jordan Brown (NIR)	9–8	Ronnie O'Sullivan (ENG)
2020–21	Gibraltar Open	Milton Keynes	Judd Trump (ENG)	4–0	Jack Lisowski (ENG)
2021–22	Northern Ireland Open	Belfast	Mark Allen (NIR)	9–8	John Higgins (SCO)
2021–22	English Open	Milton Keynes	Neil Robertson (AUS)	9–8	John Higgins (SCO)
2021–22	Scottish Open	Llandudno	Luca Brecel (BEL)	9–5	John Higgins (SCO)
2021–22	Shoot Out	Leicester	Hossein Vafaei (IRN)	1–0 (71–0)	Mark Williams (WAL)
2021–22	German Masters	Berlin	Zhao Xintong (CHN)	9–0	Yan Bingtao (CHN)
2021–22	European Masters	Milton Keynes	Fan Zhengyi (CHN)	10–9	Ronnie O'Sullivan (ENG)
2021–22	Welsh Open	Newport	Joe Perry (ENG)	9–5	Judd Trump (ENG)
2021–22	Gibraltar Open	Gibraltar	Robert Milkins (ENG)	4–2	Kyren Wilson (ENG)
2022–23	Championship League	Leicester	Luca Brecel (BEL)	3–1	Lu Ning (CHN)
2022–23	European Masters	Fürth	Kyren Wilson (ENG)	9–3	Barry Hawkins (ENG)
2022–23	Northern Ireland Open	Belfast	Mark Allen (NIR)	9–4	Zhou Yuelong (CHN)
2022–23	Scottish Open	Edinburgh	Gary Wilson (ENG)	9–2	Joe O'Connor (ENG)
2022–23	English Open	Brentwood	Mark Selby (ENG)	9–6	Luca Brecel (BEL)
2022–23	Shoot Out	Leicester	Chris Wakelin (ENG)	1–0 (119–0)	Julien Leclercq (BEL)
2022–23	German Masters	Berlin	Ali Carter (ENG)	10–3	Tom Ford (ENG)
2022–23	Welsh Open	Llandudno	Robert Milkins (ENG)	9–7	Shaun Murphy (ENG)
2023–24	Championship League	Leicester	Shaun Murphy (ENG)	3–0	Mark Williams (WAL)
2023–24	European Masters	Nuremberg	Barry Hawkins (ENG)	9–6	Judd Trump (ENG)
2023–24	English Open	Brentwood	Judd Trump (ENG)	9–7	Zhang Anda (CHN)
2023–24	Northern Ireland Open	Belfast	Judd Trump (ENG)	9–3	Chris Wakelin (ENG)
2023–24	Shoot Out	Swansea	Mark Allen (NIR)	1–0 (65–4)	Cao Yupeng (CHN)
2023–24	Scottish Open	Edinburgh	Gary Wilson (ENG)	9–5	Noppon Saengkham (THA)
2023–24	German Masters	Berlin	Judd Trump (ENG)	10–5	Si Jiahui (CHN)
2023–24	Welsh Open	Llandudno	Gary Wilson (ENG)	9–4	Martin O'Donnell (ENG)

== Statistics ==
=== Tournament winners ===
Player	Total	Northern Ireland Open	English Open	Scottish Open	Shoot Out	German Masters	European Masters	Welsh Open	Gibraltar Open	Championship League	Winning span
Judd Trump (ENG)	7	1	1	0	0	3	0	0	2	0	2020–2024
Mark Allen (NIR)	3	2	0	0	1	0	0	0	0	0	2021–2023
Gary Wilson (ENG)	3	0	0	2	0	0	0	1	0	0	2022–2024
Neil Robertson (AUS)	2	0	1	0	0	0	1	0	0	0	2020–2021
Luca Brecel (BEL)	2	0	0	1	0	0	0	0	0	1	2021–2022
Kyren Wilson (ENG)	2	0	0	0	0	0	1	0	0	1	2020–2022
Mark Selby (ENG)	2	0	1	0	0	0	1	0	0	0	2020–2022
Robert Milkins (ENG)	2	0	0	0	0	0	0	1	1	0	2022–2023
Michael Holt (ENG)	1	0	0	0	1	0	0	0	0	0	2020
Ryan Day (WAL)	1	0	0	0	1	0	0	0	0	0	2021
Jordan Brown (NIR)	1	0	0	0	0	0	0	1	0	0	2021
Hossein Vafaei (IRN)	1	0	0	0	1	0	0	0	0	0	2022
Zhao Xintong (CHN)	1	0	0	0	0	1	0	0	0	0	2022
Fan Zhengyi (CHN)	1	0	0	0	0	0	1	0	0	0	2022
Joe Perry (ENG)	1	0	0	0	0	0	0	1	0	0	2022
Chris Wakelin (ENG)	1	0	0	0	1	0	0	0	0	0	2023
Ali Carter (ENG)	1	0	0	0	0	1	0	0	0	0	2023
Shaun Murphy (ENG)	1	0	0	0	0	0	0	0	0	1	2023
Barry Hawkins (ENG)	1	0	0	0	0	0	1	0	0	0	2023
Total	32	3	3	2	4	5	5	4	3	3	2020–2024
