= Robbie McGuigan =

Northern Irish professional snooker player

Personal information
- Born: 7 July 2004 (age 22) County Antrim

Sport
- Country: Northern Ireland
- Sport: Snooker
- Professional: 2024–2026
- Highest ranking: 82 (July 2025)
- Best ranking finish: Last 32 (2025 British Open)

Robbie McGuigan (born 7 July 2004) is a former professional snooker player from Northern Ireland. In 2023, he became a three-time Northern Ireland Amateur champion, whilst still a teenager.

== Early life ==
From County Antrim, McGuigan attended Antrim Grammar School. He hit his first 147 break at thirteen years-old.

== Career ==
In 2019 McGuigan made his debut at a ranking event when he was given a wildcard aged fifteen years-old to the 2019 Northern Ireland Open. He lost to his countryman Patrick Wallace. The following year he lost in the final of the Northern Ireland Amateur snooker final, on a deciding frame, 10–9 to Declan Lavery.

In 2021, McGuigan became the youngest ever Northern Ireland Amateur snooker champion when he defeated Rab McCullough, 10–4 in the final. At 17 years and eleven months he was two and a half months younger than the previous youngest winner Mark Allen had been.

=== 2021-22 ===
In March 2022, still aged seventeen, he defended his Northern Ireland title, again beating McCullough in the final, but by a 10–6 margin. In that same month, March 2022 he won the final event of the WPBSA Q Tour season with a 5–3 victory over Scotland's Michael Collumb at the event held at the Northern Snooker Centre in Leeds, coming back from 3–0 down.

=== 2022-23 ===
In October 2022, he defeated compatriot Joel Connelly 4–0 in the preliminary round of the 2022 Northern Ireland Open before losing in the final round of qualifying.

In May 2023, he won the Northern Ireland Amateur Championship title for a third consecutive year, defeating Raymond Fry 10–8 in the final.

=== 2023-24 ===
McGuigan won the first two amateur tournaments of the 2023–24 season held in Northern Ireland. Awarded a wildcard to the 2023 Northern Ireland Open in October 2023, he defeated Muhammad Asif to qualify for the main stages of the event in Belfast. In the next round, McGuigan faced experienced campaigner Anthony McGill, McGuigan led 3–1 in the best of seven frame match and McGill required three snookers on the colours to stay in the match, before mounting a comeback to win the frame on a re-spotted black and went on to defeat McGuigan 4–3.

Given a wildcard to the 2023 UK Championship as the reigning Northern Ireland champion, he beat veteran Irishman Fergal O'Brien 6–2 in the first qualifying round, before losing by the same score in the following round to Dylan Emery.

In March 2024, he defeated Craig Steadman 5–4 in the final to win the EBSA European Snooker Championship and a tour card for the 2024/25 and 2025/26 seasons.

=== 2024-25 ===
He made a successful start to his pro career at the 2024 Championship League in Leicester in June 2024, beating Sanderson Lam 3-0 and qualifying from his round robin group. He reached the third round of the 2024 Saudi Arabia Snooker Masters with a win over Ma Hailong of China. He was defeated 10-7 by Mark Davis in qualifying for the 2025 World Championship.

=== 2025-26 ===
He was drawn in the round-robin stage of the 2025 Championship League, in Leicester in July 2025, against Shaun Murphy, Alfie Burden and Bulcsú Révész, recording wins over Murphy (including breaks of 128 and 136) and Burden, and only missed out on top-spot by frame difference.

In June, he won in the qualifying round for the 2025 British Open with a 4-2 win against Lyu Haotian. At the tournament in Cheltenham in September, he beat He Guoqiang 4-3, taking the decider on the final black, to reach the last-32. In the first round of qualifying at the 2025 UK Championship, he defeated Oliver Sykes 6-1.

In January 2026, McGuigan beat former Women's World Champion Mink Nutcharut 5-0 at the 2025 German Masters. Later that month, he reached the last-64 of the Welsh Open with a win over the higher ranked Daniel Wells. In April, he won his first round match 10-8 in the qualifying rounds for the 2026 World Snooker Championship against Hammad Miah before defeating Gong Chenzhi of China. Following defeat in the third round to Zhou Yuelong, McGuigan lost his tour card. He entered Q School in May 2026.

== Personal life ==
The son of Kyla McGuigan, he is a supporter of Manchester United. His sister Harleigh was born in July 2017. His stepfather was snooker player Mark Allen until 2020.

== Performance and rankings timeline ==
Tournament	2019/ 20	2020/ 21	2021/ 22	2022/ 23	2023/ 24	2024/ 25	2025/ 26
Ranking (Note: Shows the ranking at the beginning of the season)	(Note: He was an amateur)					(Note: New players on the Main Tour don't have a ranking)	84
Ranking tournaments
Championship League	NR	A	RR	RR	A	2R	RR
Saudi Arabia Masters	Tournament Not Held					3R	1R
Wuhan Open	Tournament Not Held				A	LQ	LQ
English Open	A	A	A	A	A	LQ	LQ
British Open	Not Held		A	A	A	LQ	2R
Xi'an Grand Prix	Tournament Not Held					LQ	LQ
Northern Ireland Open	LQ	A	A	LQ	1R	LQ	LQ
International Championship	A	Not Held			A	LQ	LQ
UK Championship	A	A	A	LQ	LQ	LQ	LQ
Shoot Out	1R	1R	1R	2R	A	1R	3R
Scottish Open	A	A	A	A	A	LQ	1R
German Masters	A	A	A	A	A	LQ	LQ
World Grand Prix	DNQ	DNQ	DNQ	DNQ	DNQ	DNQ	DNQ
Players Championship	DNQ	DNQ	DNQ	DNQ	DNQ	DNQ	DNQ
Welsh Open	A	A	A	A	A	LQ	1R
World Open	A	Not Held			A	LQ	LQ
Tour Championship	DNQ	DNQ	DNQ	DNQ	DNQ	DNQ	DNQ
World Championship	A	LQ	LQ	A	A	LQ	LQ
Former ranking tournaments
WST Pro Series	NH	RR	Tournament Not Held				
WST Classic	Not Held			1R	Not Held		

Performance Table Legend
LQ	lost in the qualifying draw	#R	lost in the early rounds of the tournament (WR = Wildcard round, RR = Round robin)	QF	lost in the quarter-finals
SF	lost in the semi–finals	F	lost in the final	W	won the tournament
DNQ	did not qualify for the tournament	A	did not participate in the tournament	WD	withdrew from the tournament

NH / Not held	means an event was not held.
NR / Non-ranking event	means an event is/was no longer a ranking event.
R / Ranking event	means an event is/was now a ranking event

== Career finals ==
=== Amateur finals: 10 (6 titles) ===
Outcome	No.	Year	Championship	Opponent in the final	Score
Runner-up	1.	2019	Challenge Tour – Event 3	(Wales) Andrew Pagett	0–3
Runner-up	2.	2020	Northern Ireland Amateur Championship	(Northern Ireland) Declan Lavery	9–10
Runner-up	3.	2020	Northern Ireland Under-21 Championship	(Northern Ireland) Fergal Quinn	4–5
Winner	1.	2021	Northern Ireland Amateur Championship	(Northern Ireland) Rab McCullagh	10–4
Winner	2.	2022	Northern Ireland Under-21 Championship	(Northern Ireland) Jamie Gardiner	5–2
Winner	3.	2022	Northern Ireland Amateur Championship (2)	(Northern Ireland) Rab McCullagh	10–6
Winner	4.	2022	Q Tour – Event 4	(Scotland) Michael Collumb	5–3
Runner-up	4.	2023	Northern Ireland Under-21 Championship (2)	(Northern Ireland) Joel Connolly	2–5
Winner	5.	2023	Northern Ireland Amateur Championship (3)	(Northern Ireland) Raymond Fry	10–8
Winner	6.	2024	EBSA European Snooker Championships	(England) Craig Steadman	5–4
