= 2024 German Masters =

Snooker tournament

2024 BetVictor German Masters

Tournament information
- Dates: 29 January – 4 February 2024
- Venue: Tempodrom
- City: Berlin
- Country: Germany
- Organisation: World Snooker Tour
- Format: Ranking event
- Total prize fund: £427,000
- Winner's share: £80,000
- Highest break: Sam Craigie (ENG) (142); Jordan Brown (NIR) (142)

Final
- Champion: Judd Trump (ENG)
- Runner-up: Si Jiahui (CHN)
- Score: 10–5

The 2024 German Masters (officially the 2024 BetVictor German Masters) was a professional snooker tournament that took place from 29 January to 4 February 2024 at the Tempodrom in Berlin, Germany. Qualifying for the tournament took place from 18 to 22 December 2023 at the Ponds Forge International Sports Centre in Sheffield, England. The 18th edition of the German Masters, first held in 1995 as the German Open, it was the twelfth ranking event of the 2023‍–‍24 season, following the World Grand Prix and preceding the Welsh Open. It was the seventh of eight events in the 2023–24 European Series. Organised by the World Snooker Tour and sponsored by BetVictor, the event was broadcast by Eurosport in Europe and by other broadcasters worldwide. The winner received the Brandon Parker Trophy and £80,000 from a total prize fund of £427,000.

Ali Carter was the defending champion, having defeated Tom Ford 10‍–‍3 in the previous year's final, but he lost 1‍–‍5 to Sam Craigie in the quarter-finals. Si Jiahui reached his first ranking event final, but Judd Trump defeated him 10‍–‍5 to win a record third German Masters title, the 27th ranking title of his career. It was Trump's fourth ranking title of the season, following his wins at the 2023 English Open, the 2023 Wuhan Open, and the 2023 Northern Ireland Open. He also secured the £150,000 European Series bonus for winning the most prize money in the series that season. It was the third time Trump had won the bonus, in the five seasons since it was introduced, having previously won it in the 2019‍–‍2020 and 2020‍–‍21 seasons.

The main stage of the tournament produced 46 century breaks, and the qualifying stage produced 30 centuries. Jordan Brown and Craigie shared the highest break prize, having both made 142 breaks, Brown in his qualifying match against Long Zehuang and Craigie in his last-64 match against Liam Pullen.

== Format ==
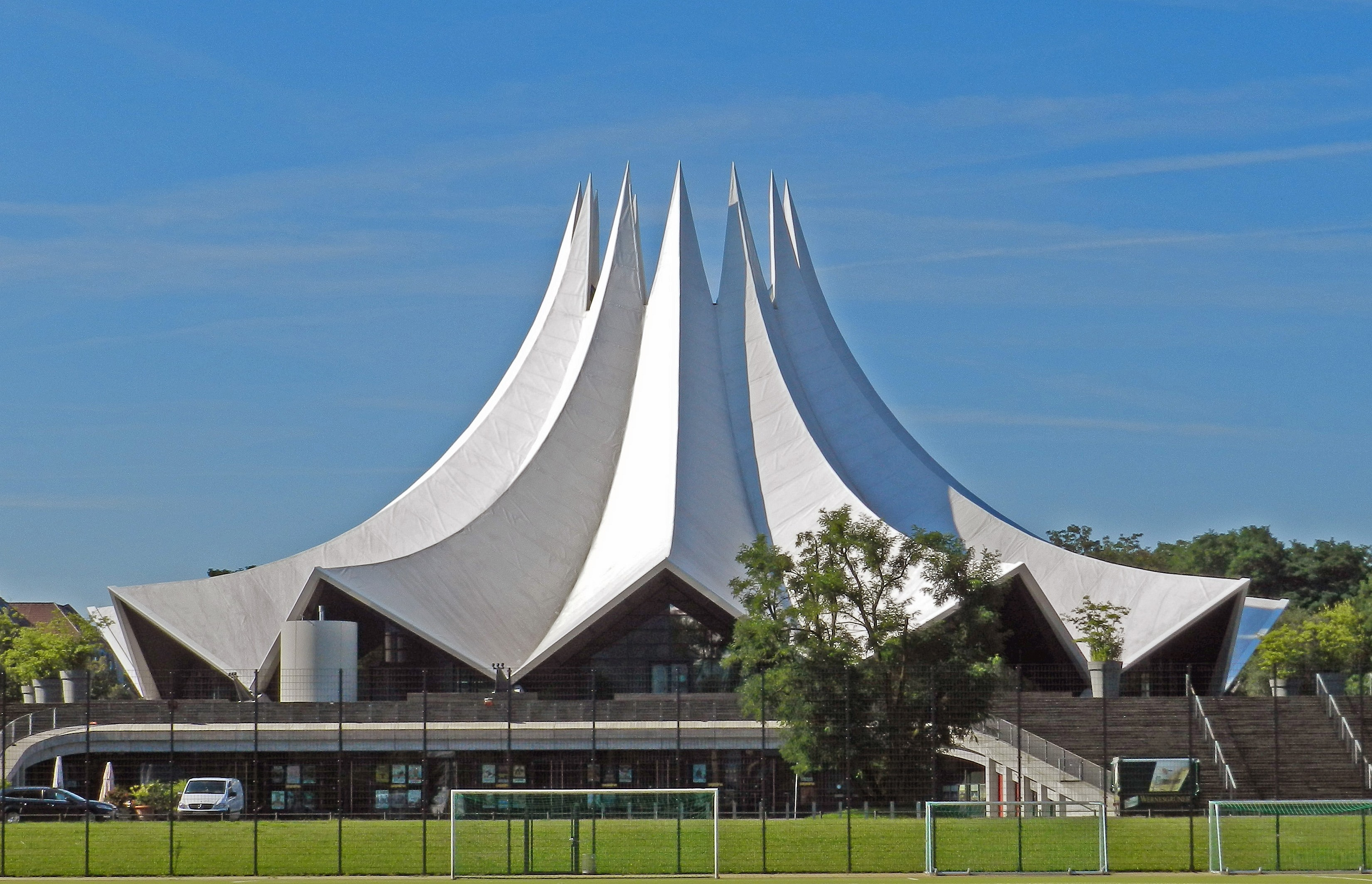
The event was held at the Tempodrom (pictured in 2011) in Berlin.

The event took place from 29 January to 4 February 2024 at the Tempodrom in Berlin, Germany. The organisers extended the length of the main stage to seven days, versus five days for previous editions. Qualifying for the tournament took place from 18 to 22 December 2023 at the Ponds Forge International Sports Centre in Sheffield, England, although matches featuring the top eight seeds were held over to be played in Berlin. Ali Carter was the defending champion, having defeated Tom Ford 10‍–‍3 in the 2023 final. The winner received the Brandon Parker Trophy.

All matches were played as the best of 9 frames until the semi-finals, which were the best of 11 frames. The final was the best of 19 frames, played over two sessions.

=== Broadcasters ===
The main stage of the event was broadcast by Eurosport and Discovery+ in Europe (including the United Kingdom and Ireland); Migu, Huya and Lioaning TV in China; Now TV in Hong Kong; Astro SuperSport in Malaysia and Brunei; TrueVisions in Thailand; Sportcast in Taiwan; Premier Sports Network in the Philippines; Fastsports in Pakistan; and Matchroom.live in all other territories.

Qualifying was broadcast by Discovery+ in Europe (including the United Kingdom and Ireland); Migu and Huya in China; and Matchroom.live in all other territories.

=== Prize fund ===
The event featured a total prize fund of £427,000 with the winner receiving £80,000. The breakdown of prize money for the event is shown below:

- Winner: £80,000
- Runner-up: £35,000
- Semi-final: £17,500
- Quarter-final: £11,000
- Last 16: £7,500
- Last 32: £4,500
- Last 64: £3,000
- Highest break: £5,000
- Total: £427,000

== Summary ==
=== Qualifying ===
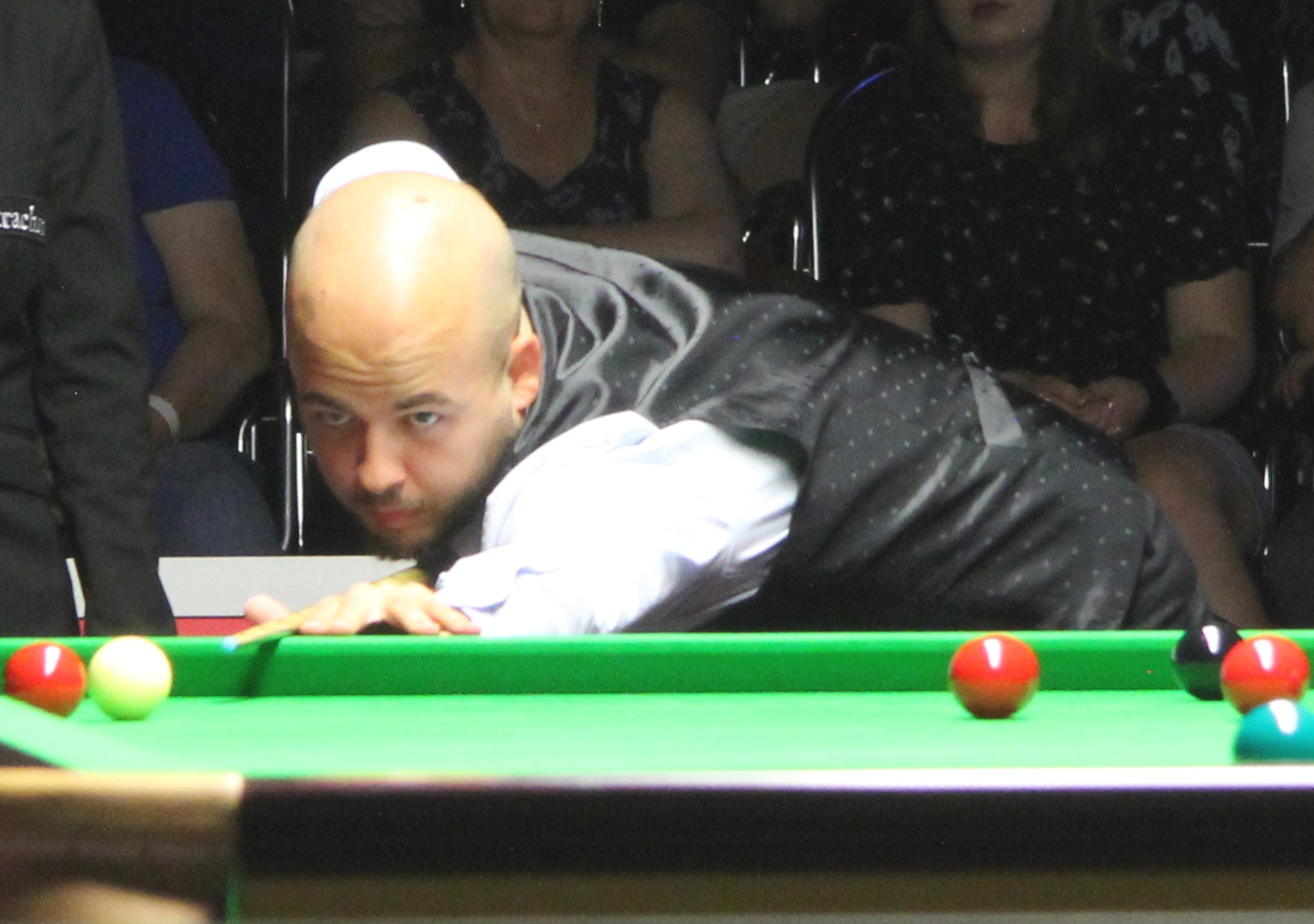
Reigning World Champion Luca Brecel (pictured in 2022) lost 2‍–‍5 in qualifying to 100th seed Ishpreet Singh Chadha.

Qualifying for the tournament took place from 18 to 22 December 2023 at the Ponds Forge International Sports Centre in Sheffield, England. Qualifying matches were the best of nine frames. Lyu Haotian led Si Jiahui 4‍–‍0, but Si won five frames in a row, making breaks of 123, 87, 98, and 103, for a 5‍–‍4 victory. Yuan Sijun defeated Ding Junhui 5‍–‍2, despite being docked a frame after returning late from the mid-session interval. The 16th seed Jack Lisowski lost 3‍–‍5 to 75th seed Zak Surety. Jordan Brown defeated Long Zehuang 5‍–‍4, making a 142 break in the fourth frame, the highest of the qualifying stages and joint highest of the tournament. Former World Champion Stuart Bingham lost 1‍–‍5 to the 99th seed Liam Pullen. Zhou Yuelong attempted a maximum break in the third frame against Jak Jones, but missed the 13th black; he won the match in a deciding frame. Mark Davis also attempted a maximum break in the fifth frame against Ashley Hugill, but missed the 15th black; he won 5‍–‍2.

Matches featuring the top eight seeds were played in Berlin on 29 January. World number one Ronnie O'Sullivan withdrew from the event for medical reasons, and was replaced by Barry Pinches. The sixth seed Mark Selby lost 1‍–‍5 to Marco Fu. The eighth seed Shaun Murphy lost 3‍–‍5 to Xu Si, who won five frames in a row, making a 131 break in the seventh. The defending champion Ali Carter won a deciding frame against Michael White. The reigning World Champion Luca Brecel lost 2‍–‍5 to 100th seed Ishpreet Singh Chadha, who was competing in his first season as a professional.

=== Early rounds ===
==== Last 64 ====
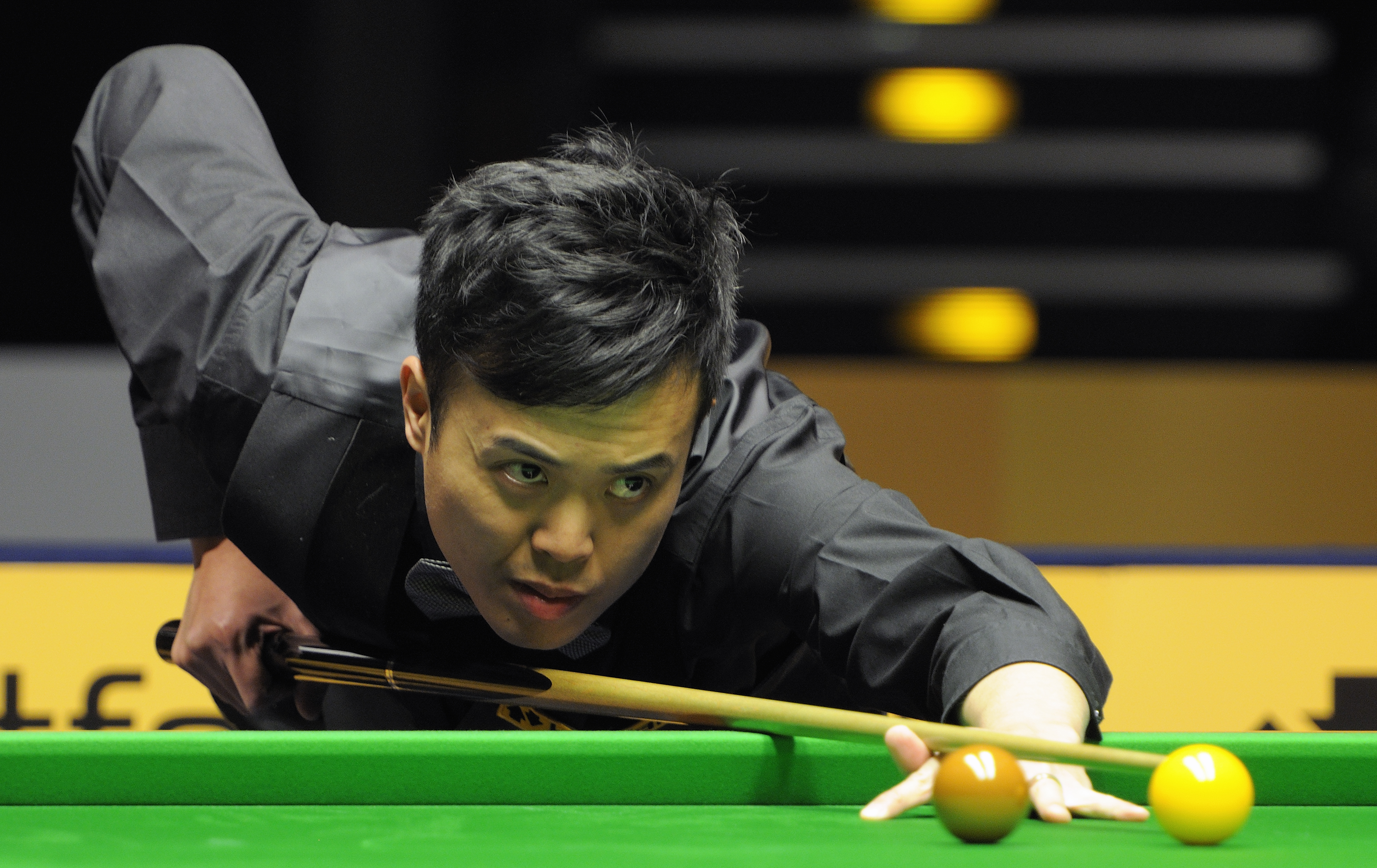
Marco Fu (pictured in 2013) defeated 2015 champion Mark Selby 5‍–‍1 in qualifying, but withdrew from his last-64 match against Alfie Davies for medical reasons.

The last-64 matches were played from 29 to 31 January as the best of nine frames. Hossein Vafaei withdrew from the event due to visa issues, and Martin Gould withdrew for medical reasons. Their respective opponents, Elliot Slessor and John Higgins, received byes to the last 32. Sam Craigie defeated Pullen 5‍–‍2, making a 142 break during the match, the joint highest of the tournament. Matthew Selt whitewashed Martin O'Donnell. Stephen Maguire made breaks of 53 and 107 to lead Joe O'Connor 2‍–‍1, but O'Connor won the match 5‍–‍3. Si defeated Mark Joyce 5‍–‍1, producing breaks of 57, 79, 87, and 140. Neil Robertson whitewashed Jimmy Robertson, making breaks of 87, 78, 135, and 86. Neil Robertson said after the match: "I need to get back to being brutal and burying opponents into the ground. I want the worst for my opponent on the table." Zhou compiled back-to-back centuries of 112 and 101 as he whitewashed Tian Pengfei. Thepchaiya Un-Nooh defeated Zhang Anda, making a 74 break in the deciding frame.

The 77th seed He Guoqiang, competing in his first season on the tour, made centuries of 121 and 102 as he defeated two-time German Masters champion Mark Williams 5‍–‍1. Surety made back-to-back centuries of 136 and 114 in his 5‍–‍2 win over Alexander Ursenbacher. The 121st seed Andrew Pagett defeated 22nd seed Chris Wakelin 5‍–‍2. Tied at 3‍–‍3 with Matthew Stevens, Judd Trump made breaks of 114 and 66 to secure a 5‍–‍3 victory. Trailing Alfie Davies 1‍–‍3, Fu withdrew at the mid-session internal for medical reasons; Davies received a bye to the last 32. Julien Leclercq trailed Ken Doherty 2‍–‍3, but won three frames in a row to clinch the match 5‍–‍3. The 59th seed Davis made breaks of 89, 66, 54, and 63 to defeat 15th seed Barry Hawkins 5‍–‍1. Kyren Wilson beat Ben Woollaston 5‍–‍1 with breaks of 96, 129, 53, and 67. Chadha and Liu Hongyu were tied at 2‍–‍2 at the mid-session interval, after Chadha made a 122 break and Liu a 128 in the third and fourth frames. Chadha made a 108 break in the eighth frame as he secured a 5‍–‍3 victory. The 23rd seed Ricky Walden and 70th seed David Lilley were tied at 4‍–‍4, but Lilley won the deciding frame.

==== Last 32 ====
The last-32 matches were played from 31 January to 1 February as the best of nine frames. Yuan made breaks of 113, 81, 115, and 80 to defeat Pagett 5‍–‍1. Ryan Day beat Robert Milkins 5‍–‍1. The 67th seed Leclercq defeated the 39th seed Jordan Brown 5‍–‍1. Allen trailed O'Connor 1‍–‍2, but won four consecutive frames for a 5‍–‍2 victory. Facing Higgins, Zhou made a 127 break in the fourth frame to level the scores at 2‍–‍2, but Higgins won the match 5‍–‍3. Un-Nooh defeated Jamie Clarke 5‍–‍1. Craigie lost the first frame to He, but took the next five with breaks of 81, 96, 84, 61, and 50 to win 5‍–‍1. Trump defeated Selt 5‍–‍2, making breaks of 66, 97, 118, and 73. The 75th seed Surety beat 49th seed Slessor 5‍–‍2. Pang Junxu made breaks of 72 and 114 against defending champion Carter, but Carter won the match 5‍–‍2. Xu lost the first three frames against Graeme Dott, but recovered to win the match with a 114 break in the deciding frame. Neil Robertson and Wilson defeated their respective opponents Perry and Lilley 5‍–‍1. Fan Zhengyi made breaks of 89, 66, 51, and 77 to lead Chadha 4‍–‍1, and went on to win the match 5‍–‍2, making a 138 break in the last frame. Tom Ford beat Davis 5‍–‍2.

==== Last 16 ====
The last-16 matches were played on 1 February as the best of nine frames. Leclercq made a 105 break to lead Day 2‍–‍0, but Day took five in a row with breaks of 72, 68, 74, 87, and 54 to win 5‍–‍2. Carter whitewashed Surety 5‍–‍0. Higgins won the first three frames against Mark Allen, making breaks of 76 and 103. Allen narrowed Higgins's lead to 3‍–‍2, but Higgins won two more frames to capture a 5‍–‍2 victory. Higgins noted after the match that he had begun working with a sport psychologist after losing 5‍–‍6 to Allen at the 2024 Masters. He commented: "I'm doing a few things off the table to try and get my mind right, which I've never done in my career."

Si won the first three frames against Yuan. Yuan made breaks of 87 and 101, but Si won the match 5‍–‍3. Trump made breaks of 110, 132, and 80 to lead Un-Nooh 4‍–‍0 at the mid-session interval. Having scored only one point in the first four frames, Un-Nooh won frames five and six with breaks of 53 and 74. However, Trump produced his third century of the match, a 135, to win 5‍–‍2. By reaching the quarter-finals, Trump secured the £150,000 European Series bonus for the most prize money in the series. This was the third season in which Trump had won the bonus, in the five seasons since it was introduced, having previously won it in the 2019‍–‍2020 and 2020‍–‍21 seasons. Trump said: "There was that added incentive, that added bit of pressure. It wasn't just a normal game." Wilson trailed Robertson by two frames, but won four frames in a row with breaks of 115 and 72 to lead 4‍–‍2, and went on to win the match 5‍–‍3. Fan lost the first two frames to Ford, but won five of the next six for a 5‍–‍3 victory. Craigie and Xu won alternating frames to level the scores at 3‍–‍3 and 4‍–‍4. Craigie won the deciding frame with a 52 break.

=== Later rounds ===
==== Quarter-finals ====
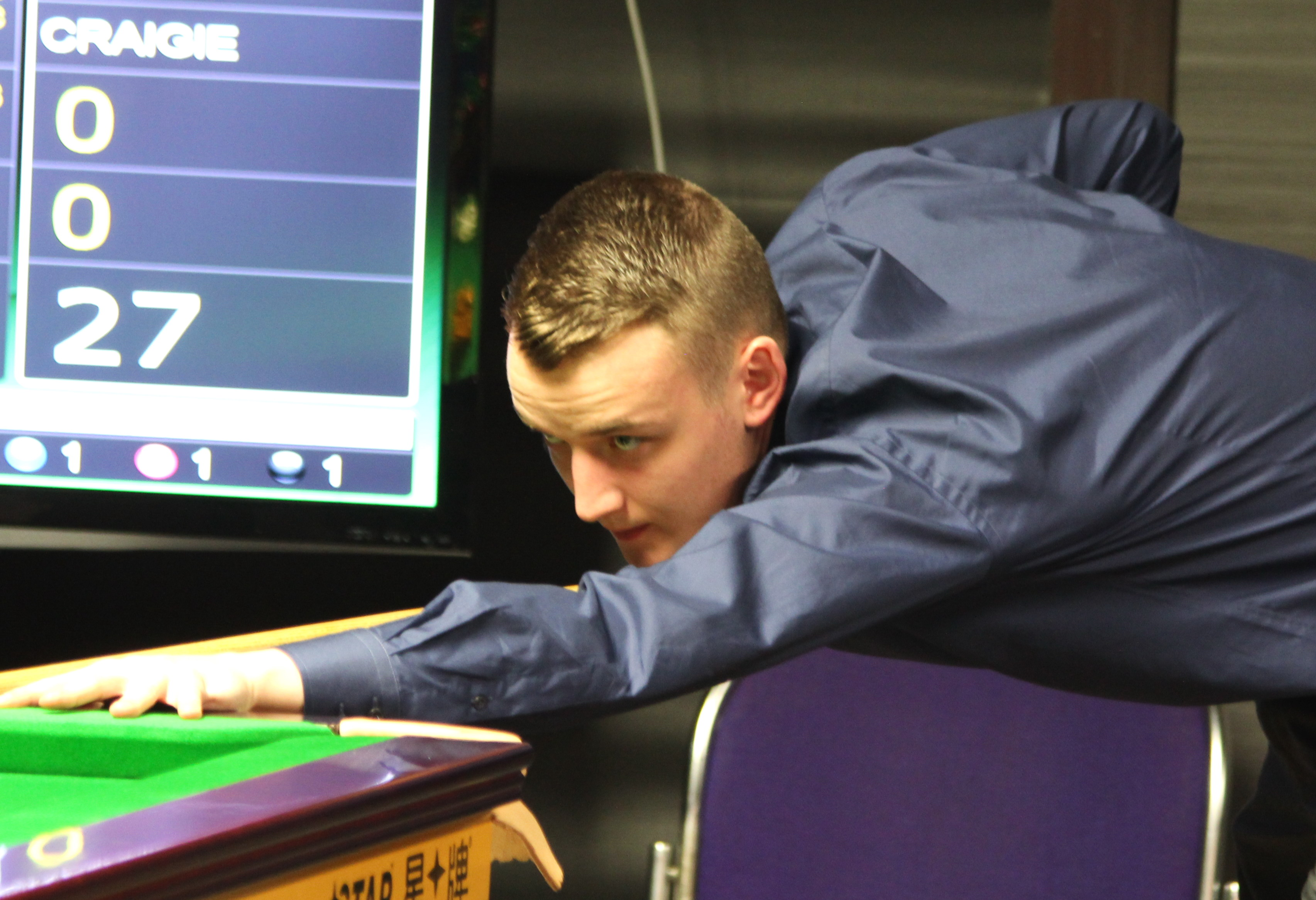
Sam Craigie (pictured in 2015) beat defending champion Ali Carter 5‍–‍1 to reach his first ranking semi-final.

The quarter-finals were played on 2 February as the best of nine frames. Trump and Higgins were tied at 2‍–‍2 at the mid-session interval, but Trump won three consecutive frames for a 5‍–‍2 victory, reaching his seventh ranking semi-final of the season. Trump said after the match: "For the first five or ten years, [Higgins] was always just getting over the line. Now I am able to do the same. Along with Ronnie [O'Sullivan], he is the benchmark. If I can beat that type of player I know I'm doing well." Si lost the first frame to Day, but won five in a row with breaks of 52, 96, 72, 75, and 73 to reach the second ranking semi-final of his career, following his semi-final appearance at the 2023 World Snooker Championship.

Wilson whitewashed Fan, making a 125 break in the first frame. Craigie, who contested the third ranking quarter-final of his career, produced breaks of 71, 65, 50, and 103 to lead the defending champion Carter 4‍–‍0 at the mid-session interval. Carter won the fifth frame with a 90 break, but Craigie won the match 5‍–‍1 to reach his first ranking semi-final. In the last frame of the match, Craigie attempted a maximum break but potted two red balls at the same time when he was on the 11th red; the break ended on 89. Craigie commented: "I stayed in the zone, just focusing on me. That is about it, trying to blank everything out and focus on my game."

==== Semi-finals ====
The semi-finals were played on 3 February as the best of 11 frames. Facing Si, the 2019 champion Wilson won the first two frames, making a 97 break in the first, but Si responded with breaks including 138, 90, and 55 as he won five consecutive frames. Wilson won the eighth after a lengthy safety battle, but Si took the ninth for a 6‍–‍3 victory. Si commented on his approach to his first ranking final: "It doesn't matter who I am playing, it's not going to change my shot selections." In the other semi-final, two-time champion Trump won four of the first five frames against Craigie. Although Craigie won the sixth frame with a 71 break, Trump made breaks of 75 and 79 to win 6‍–‍2 and reach his sixth ranking final of the season. Commenting on the age difference between himself and his 21-year-old opponent in the final, Trump said: "It is strange for me playing someone that young. I've come full circle. I was playing John Higgins in the World final at that age. I'm the one to be shot at now."

==== Final ====
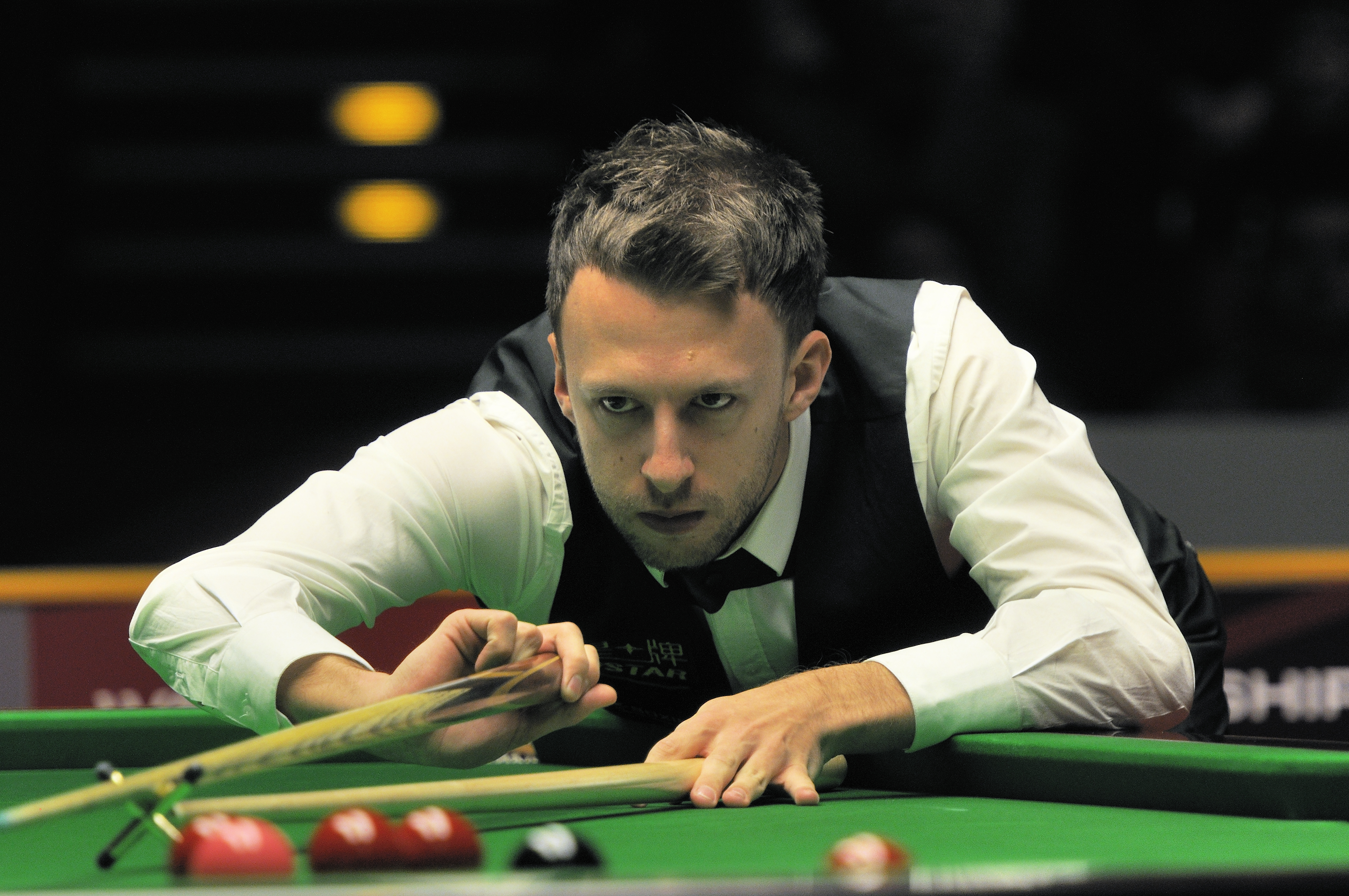
Judd Trump (pictured in 2014) defeated first-time ranking finalist Si Jiahui 10‍–‍5 to win a record third German Masters title. He won the £150,000 European Series bonus for a third time.

The final was played on 4 February as the best of 19 frames, held over two sessions, between Trump and Si, with Tatiana Woollaston officiating. Trump featured in his fourth German Masters final, having won the event in 2020 and 2021 and been runner-up in 2014, while Si contested the first ranking final of his professional career. The scores were tied at 2‍–‍2 at the mid-session interval, but Trump won the next three frames with breaks of 51, 82, and 52 to lead 5‍–‍2. Si won the eighth frame after a lengthy safety battle, reducing Trump's lead to 5‍–‍3 after the first session.

Si began the evening session by winning frame nine with a 123 break, narrowing Trump's lead to one frame at 5‍–‍4. However, Trump responded with back-to-back centuries of 113 and 108, followed by a 74 break, as he extended his lead to 8‍–‍4. Si won the 13th frame, but Trump made breaks of 66 and 81 to secure a 10‍–‍5 victory, winning a record third German Masters title, the 27th ranking title of his career. It was his fourth ranking title of the season, following his wins at the 2023 English Open, the 2023 Wuhan Open, and the 2023 Northern Ireland Open. On playing Si in the final, Trump said: "It was a tough challenge, because you never know what he is going to do next. You are always on the edge of your seat. He takes on absolutely everything. It can be a little bit tricky and you are never able to really settle. I produced my best snooker when I needed to and I didn't miss much in the second session." Si commented: "I had an incredible run to the final. After all my opponent was Judd [Trump], he is an amazing player and I have a lot to learn from him. I enjoyed this week."

== Main draw ==
The draw for the tournament is shown below. Numbers in parentheses after the players' names denote the top 32 seeded players, and players in bold denote match winners. All matches were the best of 9 frames until the semi-finals, which were the best of 11 frames. The final was the best of 19 frames, played over two sessions.

=== Top half ===
**Last 64**; Best of 9 frames
**Ali Carter (ENG) (1)**	**5**
Peng Yisong (CHN)	1
**Pang Junxu (CHN) (32)**	**5**
Haydon Pinhey (ENG)	1
**Zak Surety (ENG)**	**5**
Alexander Ursenbacher (SUI)	2
Hossein Vafaei (IRN) (17) (Note: Hossein Vafaei withdrew due to visa issues, and Elliot Slessor received a bye.)	w/d
**Elliot Slessor (ENG)**	**w/o**
**Sam Craigie (ENG)**	**5**
Liam Pullen (ENG)	2
**He Guoqiang (CHN)**	**5**
Mark Williams (WAL) (9)	1
**Graeme Dott (SCO)**	**5**
Ashley Carty (ENG)	2
Andrew Higginson (ENG)	2
**Xu Si (CHN)**	**5**
**Mark Allen (NIR) (5)**	**5**
Louis Heathcote (ENG)	2
Stephen Maguire (SCO) (28)	3
**Joe O'Connor (ENG)**	**5**
**John Higgins (SCO) (12)**	**w/o**
Martin Gould (ENG) (Note: Martin Gould withdrew for medical reasons, and John Higgins received a bye.)	w/d
**Zhou Yuelong (CHN) (21)**	**5**
Tian Pengfei (CHN)	0
**Jamie Clarke (WAL)**	**5**
Scott Donaldson (SCO)	2
**Thepchaiya Un-Nooh (THA)**	**5**
Zhang Anda (CHN) (13)	4
Martin O'Donnell (ENG)	0
**Matthew Selt (ENG) (29)**	**5**
Matthew Stevens (WAL)	3
**Judd Trump (ENG) (4)**	**5**

**Last 32**; Best of 9 frames
**(England) Ali Carter**	**5**
(China) Pang Junxu	2
**(England) Zak Surety**	**5**
(England) Elliot Slessor	2
**(England) Sam Craigie**	**5**
(China) He Guoqiang	1
(Scotland) Graeme Dott	4
**(China) Xu Si**	**5**
**(Northern Ireland) Mark Allen**	**5**
(England) Joe O'Connor	2
**(Scotland) John Higgins**	**5**
(China) Zhou Yuelong	3
(Wales) Jamie Clarke	1
**(Thailand) Thepchaiya Un-Nooh**	**5**
(England) Matthew Selt	2
**(England) Judd Trump**	**5**

**Last 16**; Best of 9 frames
**(England) Ali Carter**	**5**
(England) Zak Surety	0
**(England) Sam Craigie**	**5**
(China) Xu Si	4
(Northern Ireland) Mark Allen	2
**(Scotland) John Higgins**	**5**
(Thailand) Thepchaiya Un-Nooh	2
**(England) Judd Trump**	**5**

**Quarter-finals**; Best of 9 frames
(England) Ali Carter	1
**(England) Sam Craigie**	**5**
(Scotland) John Higgins	2
**(England) Judd Trump**	**5**

**Semi-finals**; Best of 11 frames
(England) Sam Craigie	2
**(England) Judd Trump**	**6**

Note: w/o = walkover; w/d = withdrawn

=== Bottom half ===
**Last 64**; Best of 9 frames
**Julien Leclercq (BEL)**	**5**
Ken Doherty (IRL)	3
David Gilbert (ENG) (30)	2
**Jordan Brown (NIR)**	**5**
**Robert Milkins (ENG) (14)**	**5**
Robbie Williams (ENG)	2
**Ryan Day (WAL) (19)**	**5**
Oliver Brown (ENG)	3
**Andrew Pagett (WAL)**	**5**
Chris Wakelin (ENG) (22)	3
Aaron Hill (IRL)	1
**Yuan Sijun (CHN)**	**5**
Mark Joyce (ENG)	1
**Si Jiahui (CHN) (27)**	**5**
**Alfie Davies (WAL)**	**w/o**
Marco Fu (HKG) (Note: In the last-64 match between Marco Fu and Alfie Davies, Fu conceded the match at 1‍–‍3 to Davies during the mid-session interval, due to medical reasons.)	w/d
**Neil Robertson (AUS) (7)**	**5**
Jimmy Robertson (ENG)	0
**Joe Perry (ENG) (26)**	**5**
Xing Zihao (CHN)	1
**Kyren Wilson (ENG) (10)**	**5**
Ben Woollaston (ENG)	1
Ricky Walden (ENG) (23)	4
**David Lilley (ENG)**	**5**
Xiao Guodong (CHN)	1
**Tom Ford (ENG) (18)**	**5**
**Mark Davis (ENG)**	**5**
Barry Hawkins (ENG) (15)	1
Ben Mertens (BEL)	3
**Fan Zhengyi (CHN) (31)**	**5**
Liu Hongyu (CHN)	3
**Ishpreet Singh Chadha (IND)**	**5**

**Last 32**; Best of 9 frames
**(Belgium) Julien Leclercq**	**5**
(Northern Ireland) Jordan Brown	1
(England) Robert Milkins	1
**(Wales) Ryan Day**	**5**
(Wales) Andrew Pagett	1
**(China) Yuan Sijun**	**5**
**(China) Si Jiahui**	**5**
(Wales) Alfie Davies	1
**(Australia) Neil Robertson**	**5**
(England) Joe Perry	1
**(England) Kyren Wilson**	**5**
(England) David Lilley	1
**(England) Tom Ford**	**5**
(England) Mark Davis	2
**(China) Fan Zhengyi**	**5**
(India) Ishpreet Singh Chadha	2

**Last 16**; Best of 9 frames
(Belgium) Julien Leclercq	2
**(Wales) Ryan Day**	**5**
(China) Yuan Sijun	3
**(China) Si Jiahui**	**5**
(Australia) Neil Robertson	3
**(England) Kyren Wilson**	**5**
(England) Tom Ford	3
**(China) Fan Zhengyi**	**5**

**Quarter-finals**; Best of 9 frames
(Wales) Ryan Day	1
**(China) Si Jiahui**	**5**
**(England) Kyren Wilson**	**5**
(China) Fan Zhengyi	0

**Semi-finals**; Best of 11 frames
**(China) Si Jiahui**	**6**
(England) Kyren Wilson	3

Note: w/o = walkover; w/d = withdrawn

=== Final ===
Final: Best of 19 frames. Referee: Tatiana Woollaston; Tempodrom, Berlin, Germany, 4 February 2024
**Judd Trump**; England	**10**–5	Si Jiahui; China
Afternoon: **75**–‍53, 7–‍**106**, **85**–‍6, 31–‍**77**, **96**–‍3, **82**–‍0, **77**–‍32, 26–‍**70**; Evening: 0–‍**123** (123), **113**–‍3 (113), **116**–‍0 (108), **81**–‍1, 18–‍**72**, **92**–‍32, **82**–‍16
(frame 10) 113	Highest break	**123** (frame 9)
**2**	Century breaks	1

== Qualifying ==
Qualifying for the tournament took place from 18 to 22 December 2023 at the Ponds Forge International Sports Centre in Sheffield. Matches involving the top eight seeds were held over to be played at the final venue. Numbers in parentheses after the players' names denote the top 32 seeded players, and players in bold denote match winners.

=== Berlin ===
The results of the held-over matches played in Berlin on 29 January were as follows:

- **Ali Carter** (ENG) (1) **5**–4 Michael White (WAL)
- Shaun Murphy (ENG) (8) 3–**5** **Xu Si** (CHN)
- **Julien Leclercq** (BEL) **5**–2 Barry Pinches (ENG) (Note: Barry Pinches replaced Ronnie O'Sullivan, who withdrew for medical reasons.)
- Mark Selby (ENG) (6) 1–**5** **Marco Fu** (HKG)
- **Mark Allen** (NIR) (5) **5**–4 M. Phetmalaikul (THA)
- **Judd Trump** (ENG) (4) **5**–0 Lukas Kleckers (GER)
- **Neil Robertson** (AUS) (7) **5**–1 Sanderson Lam (ENG)
- Luca Brecel (BEL) (2) 2–**5** **Ishpreet Singh Chadha** (IND)

=== Sheffield ===
The results of the qualifying matches played in Sheffield were as follows:

==== 18 December ====
- **Thepchaiya Un-Nooh** (THA) **5**–1 Jamie Jones (WAL)
- **Ken Doherty** (IRL) **5**–0 Jenson Kendrick (ENG)
- **Oliver Brown** (ENG) **5**–0 Andres Petrov (EST)
- **Si Jiahui** (CHN) (27) **5**–4 Lyu Haotian (CHN)
- **Mark Williams** (WAL) (9) **5**–3 David Grace (ENG)
- **Ricky Walden** (ENG) (23) **5**–1 Adam Duffy (ENG)
- Rory Thor (MAS) 3–**5** **Ben Mertens** (BEL)
- Dominic Dale (WAL) 0–**5** **Liu Hongyu** (CHN)
- **Elliot Slessor** (ENG) **5**–2 Iulian Boiko (UKR)
- **John Higgins** (SCO) (12) **5**–3 Daniel Wells (WAL)
- Jackson Page (WAL) 3–**5** **Robbie Williams** (ENG)
- **Barry Hawkins** (ENG) (15) **5**–2 Stuart Carrington (ENG)

==== 19 December ====
- **Sam Craigie** (ENG) **5**–2 Sean O'Sullivan (ENG)
- **He Guoqiang** (CHN) **5**–4 John Astley (ENG)
- **Aaron Hill** (IRL) **5**–3 Muhammad Asif (PAK)
- Ding Junhui (CHN) (11) 2–**5** **Yuan Sijun** (CHN)
- Jack Lisowski (ENG) (16) 3–**5** **Zak Surety** (ENG)
- Andy Lee (HKG) 1–**5** **Louis Heathcote** (ENG)
- **Robert Milkins** (ENG) (14) **5**–4 Allan Taylor (ENG)
- Ian Burns (ENG) 1–**5** **Xiao Guodong** (CHN)
- **Martin Gould** (ENG) **5**–4 James Cahill (ENG)
- **Martin O'Donnell** (ENG) **5**–2 Himanshu Jain (IND)
- **Matthew Selt** (ENG) (29) **5**–4 Dylan Emery (WAL)
- **Kyren Wilson** (ENG) (10) **5**–3 Oliver Lines (ENG)

==== 20 December ====
- **Andrew Higginson** (ENG) **5**–4 Jiang Jun (CHN)
- **Zhang Anda** (CHN) (13) **5**–3 Mostafa Dorgham (EGY)
- **Jordan Brown** (NIR) **5**–4 Long Zehuang (CHN)
- **Fan Zhengyi** (CHN) (31) **5**–1 Cao Yupeng (CHN)
- Alfie Burden (ENG) 4–**5** **Peng Yisong** (CHN)
- Stuart Bingham (ENG) (24) 1–**5** **Liam Pullen** (ENG)
- Andy Hicks (ENG) 2–**5** **Joe O'Connor** (ENG)
- Hammad Miah (ENG) 3–**5** **Jamie Clarke** (WAL)
- **Pang Junxu** (CHN) (32) **5**–2 Jimmy White (ENG)
- **Haydon Pinhey** (ENG) **5**–3 Rod Lawler (ENG)
- Gary Wilson (ENG) (20) 4–**5** **Scott Donaldson** (SCO)
- Anton Kazakov (UKR) 3–**5** **Matthew Stevens** (WAL)

==== 21 December ====
- **Alexander Ursenbacher** (SUI) **5**–0 Ma Hailong (CHN)
- **Zhou Yuelong** (CHN) (21) **5**–4 Jak Jones (WAL)
- **Chris Wakelin** (ENG) (22) **5**–3 Mohamed Ibrahim (EGY)
- **Mark Joyce** (ENG) **5**–1 Wu Yize (CHN)
- **Hossein Vafaei** (IRN) (17) **5**–0 Mink Nutcharut (THA)
- **Stephen Maguire** (SCO) (28) **5**–1 Rebecca Kenna (ENG)
- Liam Highfield (ENG) 3–**5** **Jimmy Robertson** (ENG)
- **Mark Davis** (ENG) **5**–2 Ashley Hugill (ENG)
- **Graeme Dott** (SCO) **5**–3 Victor Sarkis (BRA)
- **Ryan Day** (WAL) (19) **5**–3 Stan Moody (ENG)
- Anthony Hamilton (ENG) 1–**5** **Ben Woollaston** (ENG)
- Liam Graham (SCO) 2–**5** **David Lilley** (ENG)

==== 22 December ====
- **David Gilbert** (ENG) (30) **5**–0 Dean Young (SCO)
- Ahmed Aly Elsayed (USA) 3–**5** **Andrew Pagett** (WAL)
- **Xing Zihao** (CHN) **5**–1 Ross Muir (SCO)
- **Tom Ford** (ENG) (18) **5**–0 Baipat Siripaporn (THA)
- Noppon Saengkham (THA) (25) 2–**5** **Ashley Carty** (ENG)
- **Tian Pengfei** (CHN) **5**–4 Reanne Evans (ENG)
- **Alfie Davies** (WAL) **5**–4 Sydney Wilson (ENG)
- **Joe Perry** (ENG) (26) **5**–0 Ryan Thomerson (AUS)

== Century breaks ==
=== Main stage centuries ===
A total of 46 century breaks were made in the main stage of the tournament.

- 142, 103 – Sam Craigie
- 140, 138, 123 – Si Jiahui
- 138 – Fan Zhengyi
- 136, 114 – Zak Surety
- 135, 132, 118, 115, 114, 114, 113, 108, 110 – Judd Trump
- 135, 112, 101 – Neil Robertson
- 131, 128, 114 – Xu Si
- 129, 125, 115 – Kyren Wilson
- 128 – Liu Hongyu
- 127, 112, 101 – Zhou Yuelong
- 122, 108 – Ishpreet Singh Chadha
- 121, 102 – He Guoqiang
- 115, 113, 101, 100 – Yuan Sijun
- 114 – Pang Junxu
- 111 – Oliver Brown
- 109 – Barry Pinches
- 107 – Stephen Maguire
- 105 – Julien Leclercq
- 103 – John Higgins
- 103 – Joe Perry
- 100 – Mark Allen

=== Qualifying stage centuries ===
A total of 30 century breaks were made during the qualifying stage of the tournament.

- 142 – Jordan Brown
- 138, 103 – Barry Hawkins
- 133 – Zhang Anda
- 131 – Aaron Hill
- 131 – Kyren Wilson
- 128 – Xing Zihao
- 127, 110 – Jimmy Robertson
- 125, 125 – Jak Jones
- 123, 103 – Si Jiahui
- 119, 107 – Xiao Guodong
- 115 – Scott Donaldson
- 114, 102 – Pang Junxu
- 113 – Mark Davis
- 112 – Lyu Haotian
- 111 – He Guoqiang
- 110 – Matthew Selt
- 109 – Sam Craigie
- 106 – Mark Williams
- 104 – David Gilbert
- 104 – Zhou Yuelong
- 103 – Elliot Slessor
- 102 – Jack Lisowski
- 102 – Yuan Sijun
- 100 – Ben Woollaston
