= 2023 WST Classic =

Snooker tournament

Tournament information
- Dates: 16–22 March 2023
- Venue: Morningside Arena
- City: Leicester
- Country: England
- Organisation: World Snooker Tour
- Format: Ranking event
- Total prize fund: £427,000
- Winner's share: £80,000
- Highest break: Thepchaiya Un-Nooh (THA) (147)

Final
- Champion: Mark Selby (ENG)
- Runner-up: Pang Junxu (CHN)
- Score: 6–2

The 2023 WST Classic was a professional snooker tournament that took place from 16 to 22 March 2023 at the Morningside Arena in Leicester, England. It was the 13th ranking event of the 2022–23 season and the inaugural staging of the WST Classic, which the World Snooker Tour added to the calendar midway through the season to replace the cancelled 2023 Turkish Masters. The last qualifying event before the 2023 Tour Championship, the tournament was streamed on Matchroom.live in all territories apart from China, Hong Kong, and Thailand, where it was carried by local broadcasters. The winner received £80,000 from a total prize fund of £427,000.

Mark Selby won the only edition of the tournament. Competing in his home city, he defeated Pang Junxu 6–2 to win his 22nd ranking title, this was the first ranking final of Pang's career.

There were 88 century breaks made during the event. Judd Trump made his 900th century break in professional competition during his first-round match against David Lilley, becoming the third player—after Ronnie O'Sullivan and John Higgins—to reach that milestone. Thepchaiya Un-Nooh made the highest break of the tournament, a maximum break in the fifth frame of his last-64 match against Xu Si. This was Un-Nooh's fourth competitive maximum break.

== Format ==
The tournament featured 128 players. The top 64 players in the snooker world rankings after the Players Championship were seeded in the draw, with the remaining 64 players drawn at random against them. Matches were played as the best of seven frames up to and including the quarter-finals. The semi-finals were played over the best of nine frames. The final was played over the best of 11 frames. The last three rounds were all played on the final day.

=== Prize fund ===
The event featured a prize fund of £427,000, with the winner receiving £80,000. The breakdown of prize money for this event is shown below:

- Winner: £80,000
- Runner-up: £35,000
- Semi-final: £17,500
- Quarter-final: £11,000
- Last 16: £7,500
- Last 32: £4,500
- Last 64: £3,000
- Highest break: £5,000
- Total: £427,000

== Tournament draw ==
=== Top half ===
==== Section 1 ====
Last 128; Best of 7 frames
Ronnie O'Sullivan (ENG) (1)	4
Mohamed Ibrahim (EGY)	2
David Grace (ENG) (64)	4
Ryan Thomerson (AUS)	1
Sam Craigie (ENG) (32)	2
Hammad Miah (ENG)	4
Jamie Jones (WAL) (33)	4
Rory McLeod (JAM)	2
Gary Wilson (ENG) (16)	4
Lei Peifan (CHN)	0
Yuan Sijun (CHN) (49)	4
Andy Lee (HKG)	0
Ryan Day (WAL) (17)	1
Steven Hallworth (ENG)	4
Cao Yupeng (CHN) (48)	4
Craig Steadman (ENG)	3

Last 64; Best of 7 frames
(England) Ronnie O'Sullivan (1) (Note: O'Sullivan withdrew because of an elbow injury.)	w/d
(England) David Grace (64)	w/o
(England) Hammad Miah	3
(Wales) Jamie Jones (33)	4
(England) Gary Wilson (16)	4
(China) Yuan Sijun (49)	3
(England) Steven Hallworth	2
(China) Cao Yupeng (48)	4

Last 32; Best of 7 frames
(England) David Grace (64)	4
(Wales) Jamie Jones (33)	2
(England) Gary Wilson (16)	4
(China) Cao Yupeng (48)	3

Last 16; Best of 7 frames
(England) David Grace (64)	1
(England) Gary Wilson (16)	4

==== Section 2 ====
Last 128; Best of 7 frames
Jordan Brown (NIR) (41)	1
Allan Taylor (ENG)	4
Jimmy Robertson (ENG) (24)	3
Lukas Kleckers (GER)	4
Elliot Slessor (ENG) (56)	4
Himanshu Jain (IND)	0
Luca Brecel (BEL) (9)	2
Haydon Pinhey (ENG)	4
Liam Highfield (ENG) (40)	4
Marco Fu (HKG)	1
Zhou Yuelong (CHN) (25)	4
Julien Leclercq (BEL)	3
Jackson Page (WAL) (57)	4
Anton Kazakov (UKR)	3
Mark Williams (WAL) (8)	4
Sean O'Sullivan (ENG)	3

Last 64; Best of 7 frames
(England) Allan Taylor	0
(Germany) Lukas Kleckers	4
(England) Elliot Slessor (56)	1
(England) Haydon Pinhey	4
(England) Liam Highfield (40)	2
(China) Zhou Yuelong (25)	4
(Wales) Jackson Page (57)	4
(Wales) Mark Williams (8)	3

Last 32; Best of 7 frames
(Germany) Lukas Kleckers	4
(England) Haydon Pinhey	2
(China) Zhou Yuelong (25)	2
(Wales) Jackson Page (57)	4

Last 16; Best of 7 frames
(Germany) Lukas Kleckers	4
(Wales) Jackson Page (57)	0

==== Section 3 ====
Last 128; Best of 7 frames
Judd Trump (ENG) (5)	4
David Lilley (ENG)	1
Wu Yize (CHN) (60)	4
Ashley Hugill (ENG)	1
Joe Perry (ENG) (28)	4
Duane Jones (WAL)	0
Graeme Dott (SCO) (37)	2
Jimmy White (ENG)	4
Jack Lisowski (ENG) (12)	4
Louis Heathcote (ENG)	3
Dominic Dale (WAL) (53)	2
Si Jiahui (CHN)	4
Ricky Walden (ENG) (21)	1
Ben Mertens (BEL)	4
Pang Junxu (CHN) (44)	4
Jenson Kendrick (ENG)	2

Last 64; Best of 7 frames
(England) Judd Trump (5)	4
(China) Wu Yize (60)	1
(England) Joe Perry (28)	3
(England) Jimmy White	4
(England) Jack Lisowski (12)	2
(China) Si Jiahui	4
(Belgium) Ben Mertens	0
(China) Pang Junxu (44)	4

Last 32; Best of 7 frames
(England) Judd Trump (5)	2
(England) Jimmy White	4
(China) Si Jiahui	0
(China) Pang Junxu (44)	4

Last 16; Best of 7 frames
(England) Jimmy White	1
(China) Pang Junxu (44)	4

==== Section 4 ====
Last 128; Best of 7 frames
Ben Woollaston (ENG) (45)	4
Dylan Emery (WAL)	2
Hossein Vafaei (IRN) (20)	4
John Astley (ENG)	2
Scott Donaldson (SCO) (52)	4
Zak Surety (ENG)	2
Barry Hawkins (ENG) (13)	4
Barry Pinches (ENG)	0
Lyu Haotian (CHN) (36)	4
Michael Judge (IRL)	1
Joe O'Connor (ENG) (29)	4
Jamie O'Neill (ENG)	1
Oliver Lines (ENG) (61)	4
Mitchell Mann (ENG)	0
Neil Robertson (AUS) (4)	4
Luke Simmonds (ENG)	2

Last 64; Best of 7 frames
(England) Ben Woollaston (45)	1
(Iran) Hossein Vafaei (20)	4
(Scotland) Scott Donaldson (52)	4
(England) Barry Hawkins (13)	0
(China) Lyu Haotian (36)	4
(England) Joe O'Connor (29)	1
(England) Oliver Lines (61)	4
(Australia) Neil Robertson (4)	3

Last 32; Best of 7 frames
(Iran) Hossein Vafaei (20)	2
(Scotland) Scott Donaldson (52)	4
(China) Lyu Haotian (36)	3
(England) Oliver Lines (61)	4

Last 16; Best of 7 frames
(Scotland) Scott Donaldson (52)	1
(England) Oliver Lines (61)	4

=== Bottom half ===
==== Section 5 ====
Last 128; Best of 7 frames
Mark Allen (NIR) (3)	4
Peter Lines (ENG)	0
Mark Davis (ENG) (62)	4
Fergal O'Brien (IRL)	2
Noppon Saengkham (THA) (30)	4
Ian Burns (ENG)	3
Fan Zhengyi (CHN) (35)	4
Andres Petrov (EST)	0
Stuart Bingham (ENG) (14)	4
Ng On-yee (HKG)	0
Matthew Stevens (WAL) (51)	4
Victor Sarkis (BRA)	1
Anthony McGill (SCO) (19)	4
Peng Yisong (CHN)	0
Martin Gould (ENG) (46)	4
Andrew Higginson (ENG)	2

Last 64; Best of 7 frames
(Northern Ireland) Mark Allen (3)	4
(England) Mark Davis (62)	3
(Thailand) Noppon Saengkham (30)	4
(China) Fan Zhengyi (35)	3
(England) Stuart Bingham (14)	4
(Wales) Matthew Stevens (51)	2
(Scotland) Anthony McGill (19)	1
(England) Martin Gould (46)	4

Last 32; Best of 7 frames
(Northern Ireland) Mark Allen (3)	1
(Thailand) Noppon Saengkham (30)	4
(England) Stuart Bingham (14)	4
(England) Martin Gould (46)	1

Last 16; Best of 7 frames
(Thailand) Noppon Saengkham (30)	2
(England) Stuart Bingham (14)	4

==== Section 6 ====
Last 128; Best of 7 frames
Thepchaiya Un-Nooh (THA) (43)	4
Asjad Iqbal (PAK)	2
Ding Junhui (CHN) (22)	3
Xu Si (CHN)	4
Mark King (ENG) (54) (Note: King was suspended by the World Snooker Tour before his match.)	w/d
Muhammad Asif (PAK)	w/o
Ali Carter (ENG) (11)	4
Dechawat Poomjaeng (THA)	1
Anthony Hamilton (ENG) (38)	4
Farakh Ajaib (PAK)	3
Matthew Selt (ENG) (27)	4
Michael Holt (ENG)	3
Andy Hicks (ENG) (59)	1
James Cahill (ENG)	4
Shaun Murphy (ENG) (6)	4
Oliver Brown (ENG)	0

Last 64; Best of 7 frames
(Thailand) Thepchaiya Un-Nooh (43)	2
(China) Xu Si	4
(Pakistan) Muhammad Asif	0
(England) Ali Carter (11)	4
(England) Anthony Hamilton (38)	4
(England) Matthew Selt (27)	3
(England) James Cahill	4
(England) Shaun Murphy (6)	3

Last 32; Best of 7 frames
(China) Xu Si	2
(England) Ali Carter (11)	4
(England) Anthony Hamilton (38)	2
(England) James Cahill	4

Last 16; Best of 7 frames
(England) Ali Carter (11)	4
(England) James Cahill	3

==== Section 7 ====
Last 128; Best of 7 frames
Kyren Wilson (ENG) (7)	4
Dean Young (SCO)	1
Stuart Carrington (ENG) (58)	4
Adam Duffy (ENG)	1
Chris Wakelin (ENG) (26)	4
Reanne Evans (ENG)	1
Tian Pengfei (CHN) (39)	4
Alfie Burden (ENG)	3
John Higgins (SCO) (10)	4
Michael White (WAL)	3
Mark Joyce (ENG) (55)	4
Gerard Greene (NIR)	1
Tom Ford (ENG) (23)	3
Andrew Pagett (WAL)	4
Jamie Clarke (WAL) (42)	4
Rebecca Kenna (ENG)	0

Last 64; Best of 7 frames
(England) Kyren Wilson (7)	4
(England) Stuart Carrington (58)	0
(England) Chris Wakelin (26)	3
(China) Tian Pengfei (39)	4
(Scotland) John Higgins (10)	4
(England) Mark Joyce (55)	1
(Wales) Andrew Pagett	2
(Wales) Jamie Clarke (42)	4

Last 32; Best of 7 frames
(England) Kyren Wilson (7)	4
(China) Tian Pengfei (39)	0
(Scotland) John Higgins (10)	4
(Wales) Jamie Clarke (42)	0

Last 16; Best of 7 frames
(England) Kyren Wilson (7)	2
(Scotland) John Higgins (10)	4

==== Section 8 ====
Last 128; Best of 7 frames
Jak Jones (WAL) (47)	4
Sanderson Lam (ENG)	1
David Gilbert (ENG) (18)	4
Ian Martin (ENG)	0
Robbie Williams (ENG) (50)	4
Aaron Hill (IRL)	1
Robert Milkins (ENG) (15)	4
Mink Nutcharut (THA)	2
Stephen Maguire (SCO) (34)	4
Alexander Ursenbacher (SUI)	3
Xiao Guodong (CHN) (31)	3
Daniel Wells (WAL)	4
Zhang Anda (CHN) (63)	4
Peter Devlin (ENG)	3
Mark Selby (ENG) (2)	4
Robbie McGuigan (NIR)	1

Last 64; Best of 7 frames
(Wales) Jak Jones (47)	2
(England) David Gilbert (18)	4
(England) Robbie Williams (50)	4
(England) Robert Milkins (15)	2
(Scotland) Stephen Maguire (34)	1
(Wales) Daniel Wells	4
(China) Zhang Anda (63)	3
(England) Mark Selby (2)	4

Last 32; Best of 7 frames
(England) David Gilbert (18)	2
(England) Robbie Williams (50)	4
(Wales) Daniel Wells	1
(England) Mark Selby (2)	4

Last 16; Best of 7 frames
(England) Robbie Williams (50)	3
(England) Mark Selby (2)	4

=== Finals ===
Quarter-finals; Best of 7 frames
(England) Gary Wilson (16)	4
(Germany) Lukas Kleckers	1
(China) Pang Junxu (44)	4
(England) Oliver Lines (61)	3
(England) Stuart Bingham (14)	2
(England) Ali Carter (11)	4
(Scotland) John Higgins (10)	2
(England) Mark Selby (2)	4

Semi-finals; Best of 9 frames
(England) Gary Wilson (16)	4
(China) Pang Junxu (44)	5
(England) Ali Carter (11)	0
(England) Mark Selby (2)	5

Final; Best of 11 frames
(China) Pang Junxu (44)	2
(England) Mark Selby (2)	6

=== Final ===
Final: Best of 11 frames. Referee: Rob Spencer; Morningside Arena, Leicester, England, 22 March 2023
Pang Junxu (44); China	2–6	Mark Selby (2); England
Frame scores: 0–104 (104), 0–138 (138), 79–18, 27–87, 0–120 (120), 64–16, 33–81, 0–83
75	Highest break	138
0	Century breaks	3

== Century breaks ==
A total of 88 century breaks were made during the event.

- 147, 115 – Thepchaiya Un-Nooh
- 143, 140 – Shaun Murphy
- 141, 123 – Daniel Wells
- 140 – Mark Joyce
- 139 – Pang Junxu
- 138, 138, 120, 105, 104 – Mark Selby
- 138, 130, 104 – Xu Si
- 137, 104 – Ronnie O'Sullivan
- 137 – Stephen Maguire
- 136, 135, 126, 126, 121, 102 – John Higgins
- 136 – Andrew Higginson
- 135, 135, 121, 107, 103 – Gary Wilson
- 135, 104, 103 – Hossein Vafaei
- 135 – Anthony McGill
- 133 – Ding Junhui
- 132 – Jimmy White
- 131, 113 – Judd Trump
- 131 – Jamie Jones
- 131 – Andrew Pagett
- 130 – Graeme Dott
- 129, 112 – Barry Hawkins
- 129, 106, 101 – Ali Carter
- 129, 101 – Jack Lisowski
- 128, 102, 102 – Zhou Yuelong
- 128 – John J. Astley
- 127 – Tom Ford
- 126 – Noppon Saengkham
- 123 – Si Jiahui
- 122 – Xiao Guodong
- 120, 118, 117 – Lyu Haotian
- 120 – David Grace
- 115, 113 – Haydon Pinhey
- 115, 103 – Chris Wakelin
- 113, 100 – David Gilbert
- 110 – Jackson Page
- 109, 100 – Stuart Bingham
- 109 – Lukas Kleckers
- 109 – Matthew Selt
- 107 – Anton Kazakov
- 107 – Ben Mertens
- 105, 101 – Kyren Wilson
- 105 – Jenson Kendrick
- 104, 103 – Jamie Clarke
- 104 – Anthony Hamilton
- 103, 100 – Neil Robertson
- 102 – Mark Davis
- 101 – James Cahill
- 101 – Dechawat Poomjaeng
- 100 – Fan Zhengyi
- 100 – Liam Highfield
- 100 – Yuan Sijun
