= 2021–22 Q Tour =

Series of snooker tournaments

Details
- Duration: 19 November 2021 – 11 May 2022
- Tournaments: 5

The 2021–22 Q Tour was a series of snooker tournaments that took place during the 2021–22 snooker season. The Q Tour is the second-tier tour, run by the World Professional Billiards and Snooker Association, for players not on the main World Snooker Tour. Initially announced in July 2020, the tour was delayed by a year and started in late 2021.

A series of four events were organised with the leading money-winner gaining a place on the main tour for the 2022–23 snooker season. Si Jiahui led the list but had already got a place on tour, so Sean O´Sullivan, who finished second, got the place. The 16 highest-ranked players who had not already got a place on the main tour for the 2022–23 season, gained entry to a further event, the WPBSA Q Tour Playoff, the winner of which also got a place. Julien Leclercq won this event, beating Alex Clenshaw 5–2 in the final.

== Format ==
Except for the playoff, events were played over three days. The first day was an open qualifying day with 16 places available. The main draw started on the second day when the 16 qualifiers were joined by the 48 seeded players who qualified based on their rankings in the 2021 Q School Order of Merit to make a first round field of 64 players. There were 3 rounds on the second day and a further three on the final day, to determine the winner of the event. The 48 who qualify directly included the top 40 ranked players not currently on the main tour and a further 8 under-21 players outside this top 40.

=== Prize fund ===
Each event featured a prize fund of £12,000 with the winner receiving £2,500.

- Winner: £2,500
- Runner-up: £1,200
- Semi-final: £750
- Quarter-final: £550
- Last 16: £275
- Last 32: £150
- Total: £12,000

== Schedule ==
The schedule for the four regular events and the playoff is given below.

Date		Country	Tournament	Venue	City	Field	Winner	Runner-up	Score	Ref.
19 Nov	21 Nov	ENG	Event 1	Castle Snooker Club	Brighton	107	(England) David Lilley	(China) Si Jiahui	5–1	
10 Dec	12 Dec	WAL	Event 2	Terry Griffiths Matchroom	Llanelli	99	(China) Si Jiahui	(Wales) Michael White	5–4	
28 Jan	30 Jan	ENG	Event 3	The Winchester	Leicester	114	(England) Sean O'Sullivan	(Belgium) Julien Leclercq	5–2	
18 Mar	20 Mar	ENG	Event 4	Northern Snooker Centre	Leeds	116	(Northern Ireland) Robbie McGuigan	(Scotland) Michael Collumb	5–3	
10 May	11 May	ENG	Playoff	Q House Snooker Academy	Darlington	16	(Belgium) Julien Leclercq	(England) Alex Clenshaw	5–2	

== Rankings ==
Below are listed the leading players in the prize money rankings. Players on equal points were ranked by "countback", with the player having the most prize money in the later events being ranked higher. Three of the players earned places on the main tour during the season. Si Jiahui qualified by winning the World Snooker Federation Open, while David Lilley and Michael White qualified via the 2021–22 season one year ranking list.

Rank	Player	Event 1	Event 2	Event 3	Event 4	Total (£)
1	(China) Si Jiahui *	1,200	2,500	550	0	4,250
2	(England) Sean O´Sullivan +	0	750	2,500	0	3,250
3	(Northern Ireland) Robbie McGuigan	150	275	0	2,500	2,925
4	(England) David Lilley *	2,500	150	275	0	2,925
5	(Belgium) Ben Mertens	0	750	750	275	1,775
6	(Scotland) Michael Collumb	275	0	275	1,200	1,750
7	(England) Simon Bedford	750	0	0	750	1,500
8	(Belgium) Julien Leclercq +	0	0	1,200	275	1,475
9	(Wales) Michael White *	0	1,200	275	0	1,475
10	(England) Alex Millington	750	275	150	150	1,325
11	(England) Alex Clenshaw	0	550	0	750	1,300
12	(England) Harvey Chandler	550	0	550	150	1,250
13	(Wales) Daniel Wells	550	275	275	150	1,250
14	(England) Brandon Sargeant	275	150	150	550	1,125
15	(Wales) Liam Davies	550	0	0	550	1,100
16	(England) Alfie Lee	275	0	750	0	1,025
17	(Cyprus) Michael Georgiou	275	150	0	550	975
18	(England) Hamim Hussain	0	0	150	550	700
19	(England) Ryan Davies	150	275	0	275	700
20	(England) Mark Lloyd	0	550	0	150	700

* Qualified for the main tour through other means
+ Qualified for the main tour

== Event 1 ==
The first event took place at Castle Snooker Club, Brighton, from 19 to 21 November 2021. David Lilley beat Si Jiahui 5–1 in the final. The final-day results are given below.

Quarter-finals; Best of 7 frames
(Wales) Liam Davies	1
(England) Alex Millington	4
(England) David Lilley	4
(Wales) Daniel Wells	3
(England) Simon Bedford	4
(England) Harvey Chandler	0
(China) Si Jiahui	4
(Japan) Keishin Kamihashi	1

Semi-finals; Best of 7 frames
(England) Alex Millington	0
(England) David Lilley	4
(England) Simon Bedford	2
(China) Si Jiahui	4

Final; Best of 9 frames
(England) David Lilley	5
(China) Si Jiahui	1

== Event 2 ==
The second event was held at the Terry Griffiths Matchroom in Llanelli from 10 to 12 December. Si Jiahui beat Michael White 5–4 in the final. Si led 4–0 before White won the next four frames to take the match to a decider. The final-day results are given below.

Quarter-finals; Best of 7 frames
(England) Sean O'Sullivan	4
(England) Mark Lloyd	3
(China) Si Jiahui	4
(England) Sydney Wilson	1
(Wales) Michael White	4
(England) Alex Clenshaw	2
(England) Sanderson Lam	1
(Belgium) Ben Mertens	4

Semi-finals; Best of 7 frames
(England) Sean O'Sullivan	3
(China) Si Jiahui	4
(Wales) Michael White	4
(Belgium) Ben Mertens	0

Final; Best of 9 frames
(China) Si Jiahui	5
(Wales) Michael White	4

== Event 3 ==
The third event was held at The Winchester in Leicester from 28 to 30 January. Nutcharut Wongharuthai, Thailand's leading female player, won five matches to reach the final-day quarter-finals. Sean O'Sullivan won the event, beating Julien Leclercq 5–2 in the final. The final-day results are given below.

Quarter-finals; Best of 7 frames
(Thailand) Nutcharut Wongharuthai	0
(Belgium) Ben Mertens	4
(Belgium) Julien Leclercq	4
(China) Si Jiahui	3
(England) Harvey Chandler	3
(England) Sean O'Sullivan	4
(England) Alfie Lee	4
(Israel) Eden Sharav	2

Semi-finals; Best of 7 frames
(Belgium) Ben Mertens	2
(Belgium) Julien Leclercq	4
(England) Sean O'Sullivan	4
(England) Alfie Lee	0

Final; Best of 9 frames
(Belgium) Julien Leclercq	2
(England) Sean O'Sullivan	5

== Event 4 ==
The fourth event was held at the Northern Snooker Centre in Leeds from 18 to 20 March. At the start of the final day only Simon Bedford could take the automatic qualification place held by Sean O'Sullivan. However Bedford lost to Robbie McGuigan in the semi-finals, guaranteeing that O'Sullivan would take the automatic qualification place. McGuigan went on to win the event, beating Michael Collumb 5–3 in the final. The final-day results are given below.

Quarter-finals; Best of 7 frames
(Cyprus) Michael Georgiou	3
(England) Simon Bedford	4
(Northern Ireland) Robbie McGuigan	4
(England) Hamim Hussain	2
(England) Alex Clenshaw	4
(England) Brandon Sargeant	2
(Scotland) Michael Collumb	4
(Wales) Liam Davies	2

Semi-finals; Best of 7 frames
(England) Simon Bedford	3
(Northern Ireland) Robbie McGuigan	4
(England) Alex Clenshaw	3
(Scotland) Michael Collumb	4

Final; Best of 9 frames
(Northern Ireland) Robbie McGuigan	5
(Scotland) Michael Collumb	3

== Playoff ==
The final event, the WPBSA Q Tour Playoff, was held at the Q House Snooker Academy in Darlington on 10 and 11 May. The event saw the 16 highest ranked players, excluding the four already qualified for the main tour, compete for a further place on that tour. Two rounds were played each day with matches over 7 frames except for the final which was over 9 frames. The draw was seeded, based on the final rankings. Julien Leclercq won the event, beating Alex Clenshaw 5–2 in the final. Leclercq scored three centuries in his opening match against Alfie Lee, and reached the final with further wins against Michael Georgiou and Harvey Chandler. Clenshaw had won his semi-final against Liam Davies despite losing the first three frames. Clenshaw won the first two frames in the final but Leclercq won the next five, to win a place on the main tour.

Last-16; Best of 7 frames
(Northern Ireland) Robbie McGuigan	4
(England) Mark Lloyd	0
(England) Harvey Chandler	4
(Wales) Daniel Wells	3
(Belgium) Julien Leclercq	4
(England) Alfie Lee	0
(England) Simon Bedford	3
(Cyprus) Michael Georgiou	4
(Scotland) Michael Collumb	4
(England) Hamim Hussain	2
(England) Alex Millington	0
(Wales) Liam Davies	4
(England) Alex Clenshaw	4
(England) Brandon Sargeant	3
(Belgium) Ben Mertens	1
(England) Ryan Davies	4

Quarter-finals; Best of 7 frames
(Northern Ireland) Robbie McGuigan	3
(England) Harvey Chandler	4
(Belgium) Julien Leclercq	4
(Cyprus) Michael Georgiou	3
(Scotland) Michael Collumb	1
(Wales) Liam Davies	4
(England) Alex Clenshaw	4
(England) Ryan Davies	0

Semi-finals; Best of 7 frames
(England) Harvey Chandler	1
(Belgium) Julien Leclercq	4
(Wales) Liam Davies	3
(England) Alex Clenshaw	4

Final; Best of 9 frames
(Belgium) Julien Leclercq	5
(England) Alex Clenshaw	2
