= Julien Leclercq (snooker player) =

Belgian snooker player

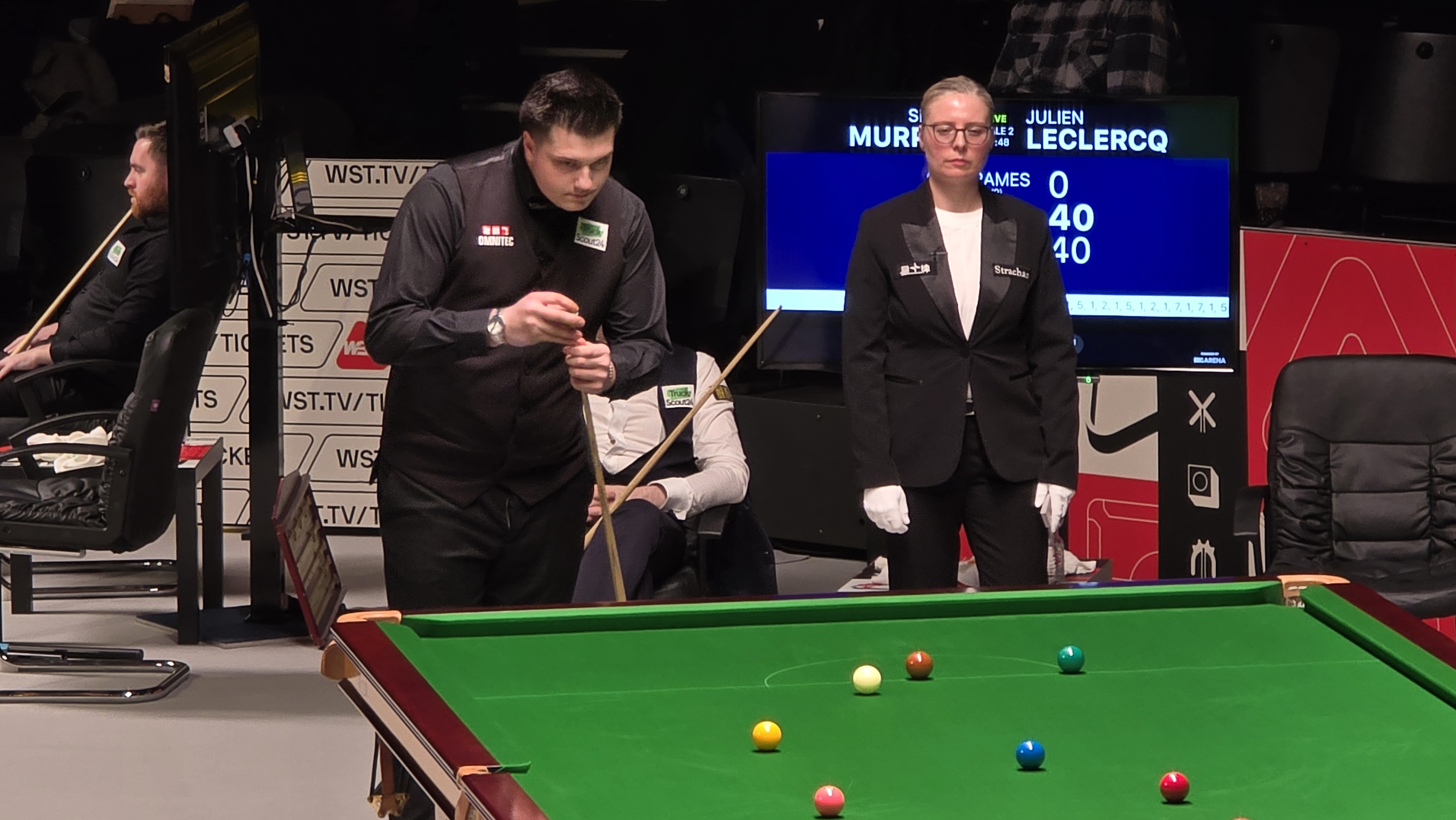
- Leclercq at German Masters in 2026

Personal information
- Nickname: The Belgian Beast
- Born: 3 February 2003 (age 23) Crisnée, Liège, Belgium

Sport
- Country: Belgium
- Sport: Snooker
- Professional: 2022–present
- Highest ranking: 62 (July 2023)
- Current ranking: 98 (as of 7 November 2026)
- Best ranking finish: Runner-up (2023 Shoot Out)

Julien Leclercq (born 3 February 2003) is a Belgian professional snooker player.

Leclercq turned professional in 2022 after winning the Q Tour Playoff and gained a two-year tour card for the 2022–23 and 2023–24 snooker seasons.

Leclercq is one of the tallest snooker players on the professional circuit at 197 centimetres (6'6") and goes by the nickname "The Belgian Beast".

== Performance and rankings timeline ==
Tournament	2020/ 21	2022/ 23	2023/ 24	2024/ 25	2025/ 26	2026/ 27
Ranking (Note: It shows the ranking at the beginning of the season)	(Note: He was an amateur)	(Note: New players on the Main Tour don't have a ranking)	68	(Note: Players qualified One Year Ranking List started the season without ranking points)	77	
Ranking tournaments
Championship League	A	RR	RR	RR	RR	RR
China Open	Tournament Not Held					LQ
Wuhan Open	Not Held		LQ	LQ	LQ	LQ
British Open	NH	LQ	2R	LQ	LQ	LQ
English Open	A	1R	1R	LQ	LQ	LQ
Shenzhen Open (Note: The event was called the Xi'an Grand Prix (2024/2025–2025/2026))	Not Held			1R	LQ	LQ
Northern Ireland Open	A	1R	1R	LQ	LQ	LQ
International Championship	Not Held		LQ	LQ	LQ	2R
UK Championship	A	LQ	LQ	LQ	1R	
Shoot Out	A	F	2R	1R	3R	
Scottish Open	A	LQ	1R	1R	LQ	LQ
German Masters	A	LQ	3R	LQ	1R	LQ
Welsh Open	A	2R	1R	LQ	1R	
World Grand Prix	DNQ	DNQ	DNQ	DNQ	DNQ	
Players Championship	DNQ	DNQ	DNQ	DNQ	DNQ	
World Open	Not Held		LQ	LQ	1R	
Tour Championship	DNQ	DNQ	DNQ	DNQ	DNQ	
World Championship	LQ	LQ	LQ	LQ	LQ	
Former ranking tournaments
WST Classic	NH	1R	Tournament Not Held			
European Masters	A	LQ	LQ	Not Held		
Saudi Arabia Masters	Not Held			2R	3R	NH

Performance Table Legend
LQ	lost in the qualifying draw	#R	lost in the early rounds of the tournament (WR = Wildcard round, RR = Round robin)	QF	lost in the quarter-finals
SF	lost in the semi-finals	F	lost in the final	W	won the tournament
DNQ	did not qualify for the tournament	A	did not participate in the tournament	WD	withdrew from the tournament

NH / Not Held	means an event was not held
NR / Non-Ranking Event	means an event is/was no longer a ranking event
R / Ranking Event	means an event is/was a ranking event
MR / Minor-Ranking Event	means an event is/was a minor-ranking event
PA / Pro-am Event	means an event is/was a pro-am event

== Career finals ==
=== Ranking finals: 1 ===
Outcome	No.	Year	Championship	Opponent(s) in the final	Score
Runner-up	1.	2023	Snooker Shoot Out	(England) Chris Wakelin	0–1

=== Team finals: 2 (1 title) ===
Outcome	No.	Year	Championship	Team/Partner	Opponent(s) in the final	Score
Winner	1.	2021	European Team Snooker Championships	Belgium 1 Kevin Hanssens	Wales 1 Elfed Evans; Darren Morgan	5–2
Runner-up	1.	2022	European Team Snooker Championships	Belgium 1 Kevin Hanssens	Poland 1 Mateusz Baranowski; Antoni Kowalski	3–5

=== Amateur finals: 4 (1 title) ===
Outcome	No.	Year	Championship	Opponent in the final	Score
Runner-up	1.	2021	EBSA European Under-18 Championship	(Belgium) Ben Mertens	3–4
Runner-up	2.	2021	EBSA European Under-21 Championship	(Wales) Dylan Emery	2–5
Runner-up	3.	2022	Q Tour - Event 3	(England) Sean O'Sullivan	2–5
Winner	1.	2022	Q Tour - Play-Off	(England) Alex Clenshaw	5–2
