= Si Jiahui =

Chinese snooker player

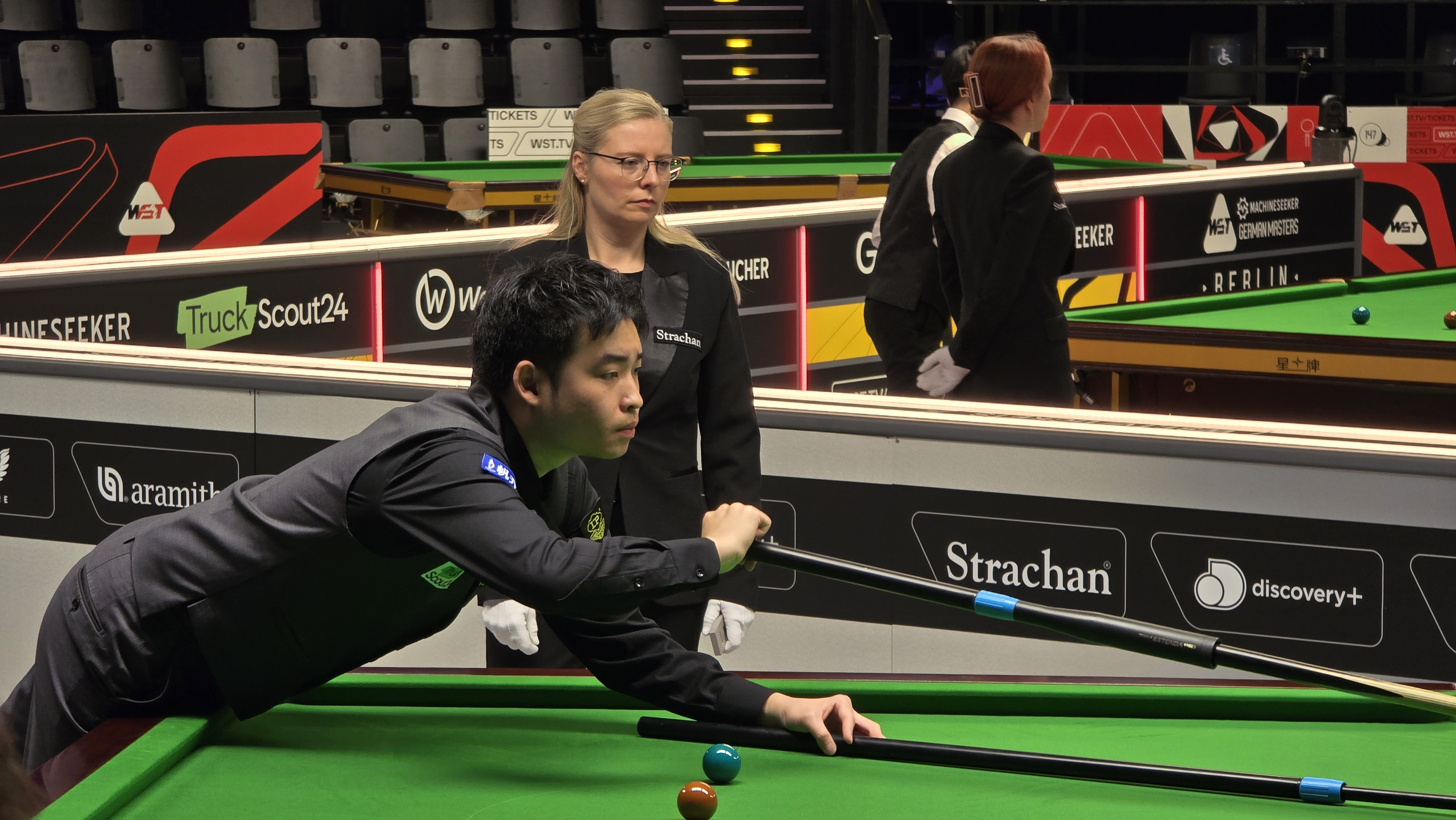
- Si Jiahui at German Masters 2025

Personal information
- Nickname: Pearl
- Born: 11 July 2002 (age 24) Zhuji, Zhejiang, China

Sport
- Country: China
- Sport: Snooker
- Professional: 2019–2021, 2022–present
- Highest ranking: 12 (February 2025)
- Current ranking: 25 (as of 26 October 2026)
- Maximum breaks: 2
- Century breaks: 124 (as of 4 November 2026)
- Best ranking finish: Runner-up (x2)

Si Jiahui
- Traditional Chinese: 斯佳輝
- Simplified Chinese: 斯佳辉
Transcriptions
Standard Mandarin
- Hanyu Pinyin: Sī Jiāhuī
- IPA: [sí tɕjá.xwéɪ]
Yue: Cantonese
- Yale Romanization: Sī Gāai Fāi
- Jyutping: Si¹ Gaai¹ Fai¹

Si Jiahui (Chinese: 斯佳辉 sí-tɕjá-xwéɪ; born 11 July 2002) is a Chinese professional snooker player. After training at the Wiraka Billiard Academy in Foshan, he moved to the United Kingdom aged 16 and earned a two-year tour card through the 2019 Q School for the 2019–20 and 2020–21 seasons. He lost his tour card after ending the 2020–21 season outside the top 64 in the world rankings, and competed as an amateur during the 2021–22 season, during which he defeated Shaun Murphy 6–5 in the first round of the 2021 UK Championship. After rejoining the professional tour at the start of the 2022–23 season, he reached his first ranking quarter-final at the 2022 European Masters.

At the 2023 World Snooker Championship, Si won three qualifying matches to reach the tournament's final stages at the Crucible Theatre for the first time. He then defeated Murphy, Robert Milkins, and Anthony McGill as he progressed to the semi-finals, becoming the first Crucible debutant to reach the last four since Andy Hicks in 1995. Although he led 14–5 in the semi-final, he lost 15–17 to the eventual winner Luca Brecel; this nine-frame deficit was the largest lead overturned in the history of the World Championship. He advanced from 80th to 36th in the world rankings after the tournament. Si reached the first ranking final of his career at the following season's 2024 German Masters, but lost 5–10 to Judd Trump.

Si achieved his first maximum break in professional competition in his 6–2 win against Judd Trump in the semi-final of the 2024 Wuhan Open. In his second ranking final, Si lost against Xiao Guodong.

== Early life ==
Born on 11 July 2002, in the Dongbaihu district of Zhuji, in Zhejiang, Si resided with his parents in Hangzhou. He competed in table tennis tournaments as a child, winning second place in a school tournament and competing in other tournaments in the city. He became interested in cue sports after his father opened a pool club dedicated to Chinese eight-ball. Si showed talent at the sport, and his father pressured him to excel at it. By age 10, Si was practising for 13 hours a day under the supervision of his father and beating all other players at the club.

Si entered a nine-ball tournament in Shanghai for elementary school students, where he was runner-up. At the tournament, his father met another father whose son was training at a snooker academy in Guangdong. In September 2013, aged 11, Si left school and moved to Guangdong, accompanied by his father, where he began playing snooker. At age 12, he began training at the Wiraka Billiard Academy in Foshan, where he was coached by Roger Leighton. At 14, he defeated former world number one Ding Junhui 3–2 in a national tournament.

At age 16, Si moved to the United Kingdom. He joined Victoria’s Snooker Academy in Sheffield, a stable of mostly Chinese players managed by former snooker journalist Victoria Shi. Other players at the Academy upon Si's arrival included Zhao Xintong, Yan Bingtao, and Fan Zhengyi.

== Career ==
Si received a two-year professional tour card through the 2019 Q School for the 2019–20 and 2020–21 seasons. However, he was relegated from the World Snooker Tour after finishing the 2020–21 season 92nd in the snooker world rankings, below the cut-off at 64th position.

Si spent the 2021–22 season competing as an amateur, but earned top-up places in ranking tournaments through his high placement in the 2021 Q School Order of Merit. At the 2021 UK Championship, he defeated former world champion Shaun Murphy 6–5 in the first round. In a BBC radio interview after the match, Murphy objected to amateur players featuring in professional events, saying that he had "lost to someone who shouldn’t even be in the building". The World Snooker Tour issued a statement disagreeing with these remarks, and Murphy subsequently apologised for "taking the shine off" Si's win.

Towards the end of the season, Si won the 2022 World Snooker Federation Open amateur event, defeating Lee Stephens 5–0 in the final. This win earned him a two-year professional tour card for the 2022–23 and 2023–24 seasons. At the 2022 European Masters, he defeated Anthony McGill and Daniel Wells to reach his first quarter-final at a ranking event, which he lost 2–5 to Kyren Wilson.

Ranked 80th in the world rankings, he qualified for the main stage of the 2023 World Snooker Championship after defeating Florian Nüßle 10–7, Tom Ford 10–5, and Jordan Brown 10–7 in the qualifying rounds. In the first round at the Crucible Theatre, Si defeated Murphy 10–9. On this occasion, Murphy commented on how well Si had played, saying he had been "fabulous". Si defeated Robert Milkins 13–7 in the second round and McGill 13–12 in the quarter-finals, becoming the first Crucible debutant to reach the World Championship semi-finals since Andy Hicks in 1995 and the youngest player to do so since Ronnie O'Sullivan in 1996. Si lost 15–17 to Luca Brecel in the semi-finals after Brecel, from 5–14 down, won 12 of the last 13 frames. Si advanced from 80th to 36th in the world rankings as a result of his performance at the tournament.

Si reached the first ranking final of his career at the following season's 2024 German Masters, but lost 5–10 to Judd Trump. At the 2024 World Championship, he defeated Mark Williams 10–9 in the first round and then lost 9–13 to Jak Jones in the last 16. The 2025 Masters marked his first appearance at the tournament, but Si lost in the first round to Mark Allen 2–6. At the 2025 World Championship, Si advanced to the quarter-finals where he was defeated by O'Sullivan 9–13.

== Personal life ==
Si lives in Sheffield during the snooker season. He did not see his family or his friends during the COVID-19 pandemic; after the 2023 Welsh Open, he visited China for the first time in three years. During the 2020–21 season, he dyed his hair blue.

== Performance and rankings timeline ==
Tournament	2016/ 17	2017/ 18	2018/ 19	2019/ 20	2020/ 21	2021/ 22	2022/ 23	2023/ 24	2024/ 25	2025/ 26	2026/ 27
Ranking (Note: It shows the ranking at the beginning of the season)	(Note: He was an amateur)			(Note: new players on the Main Tour don't have a ranking)	77			34	20	15	16
Ranking tournaments
Championship League	Non-Ranking Event				RR	RR	RR	2R	2R	RR	RR
China Open	A	A	A	Tournament Not Held							2R
Wuhan Open	Tournament Not Held							2R	F	QF	2R
British Open	Tournament Not Held					1R	LQ	2R	1R	LQ	LQ
English Open	A	A	A	4R	1R	LQ	LQ	2R	3R	2R	1R
Shenzhen Open (Note: The event was called the Xi'an Grand Prix (2024/2025–2025/2026))	Tournament Not Held								2R	2R	2R
Northern Ireland Open	A	A	A	3R	1R	LQ	1R	LQ	1R	3R	1R
International Championship	A	A	A	LQ	Not Held			1R	2R	3R	3R
UK Championship	A	A	A	1R	1R	2R	LQ	LQ	1R	2R	
Shoot Out	A	A	A	1R	WD	1R	1R	QF	3R	1R	
Scottish Open	A	A	A	2R	1R	1R	LQ	2R	2R	2R	
German Masters	A	A	A	LQ	LQ	LQ	1R	F	2R	2R	
Welsh Open	A	A	A	2R	2R	2R	1R	2R	1R	1R	
World Grand Prix	Did Not Qualify								1R	QF	
Players Championship	Did Not Qualify								1R	DNQ	
World Open	A	A	A	LQ	Not Held			1R	LQ	LQ	
Tour Championship	Not Held		A	Did Not Qualify					1R	DNQ	
World Championship	A	A	A	LQ	LQ	LQ	SF	2R	QF	1R	
Non-ranking tournaments
Shanghai Masters	Ranking Event		A	A	Not Held			1R	QF	2R	2R
The Masters	A	A	A	A	A	A	A	A	1R	1R	
Championship League	A	A	A	A	A	A	A	A	2R	SF	
Former ranking tournaments
Riga Masters	A	A	A	LQ	Tournament Not Held						
China Championship	NR	A	A	LQ	Tournament Not Held						
WST Pro Series	Tournament Not Held				RR	Tournament Not Held					
Turkish Masters	Tournament Not Held					3R	Tournament Not Held				
Gibraltar Open	A	A	A	1R	2R	WD	Tournament Not Held				
WST Classic	Tournament Not Held						3R	Tournament Not Held			
European Masters	A	A	A	LQ	1R	LQ	QF	2R	Not Held		
Saudi Arabia Masters	Tournament Not Held								SF	6R	NH
Former non-ranking tournaments
Six-red World Championship	A	A	A	A	Not Held		LQ	Tournament Not Held			
Haining Open	1R	1R	3R	3R	NH	A	A	Tournament Not Held			

Performance Table Legend
LQ	lost in the qualifying draw	#R	lost in the early rounds of the tournament (WR = Wildcard round, RR = Round robin)	QF	lost in the quarter-finals
SF	lost in the semi-finals	F	lost in the final	W	won the tournament
DNQ	did not qualify for the tournament	A	did not participate in the tournament	WD	withdrew from the tournament

NH / Not Held	means an event was not held.
NR / Non-ranking event	means an event is/was no longer a ranking event.
R / Ranking event	means an event is/was a ranking event.
MR / Minor-ranking event	means an event is/was a minor-ranking event.

== Career finals ==
=== Ranking finals: 2 ===
Outcome	No.	Year	Championship	Opponent in the final	Score
Runner-up	1.	2024	German Masters	(England) Judd Trump	5–10
Runner-up	2.	2024	Wuhan Open	(China) Xiao Guodong	7–10

=== Amateur finals: 3 (2 titles) ===
Outcome	No.	Year	Championship	Opponent in the final	Score
Runner-up	1.	2021	Q Tour – Event 1	(England) David Lilley	1–5
Winner	1.	2021	Q Tour – Event 2	(Wales) Michael White	5–4
Winner	2.	2022	WSF Open	(England) Lee Stephens	5–0
