= Sean O'Sullivan (snooker player) =

English snooker player (born 1994)

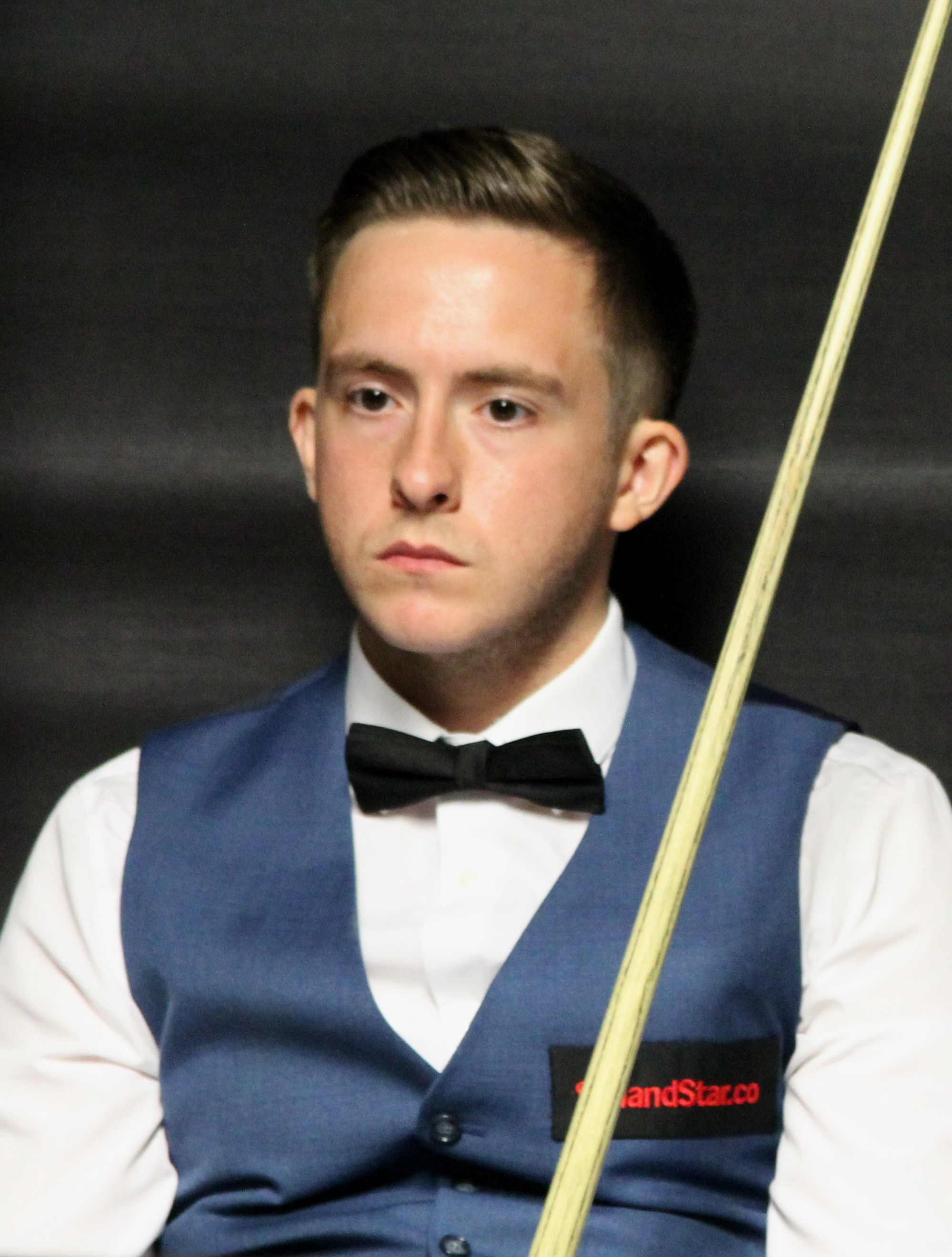
- Paul Hunter Classic 2016

Personal information
- Nickname: The Storm
- Born: 29 April 1994 (age 32) Whitechapel, East London

Sport
- Country: England
- Sport: Snooker
- Professional: 2012–2014, 2015–2019, 2022–2024, 2026–present
- Highest ranking: 73 (June–July 2016)
- Current ranking: 121 (as of 7 November 2026)
- Maximum breaks: 1
- Best ranking finish: Last 16 (x1)

Sean O'Sullivan (born 29 April 1994) is an English professional snooker player.

== Career ==
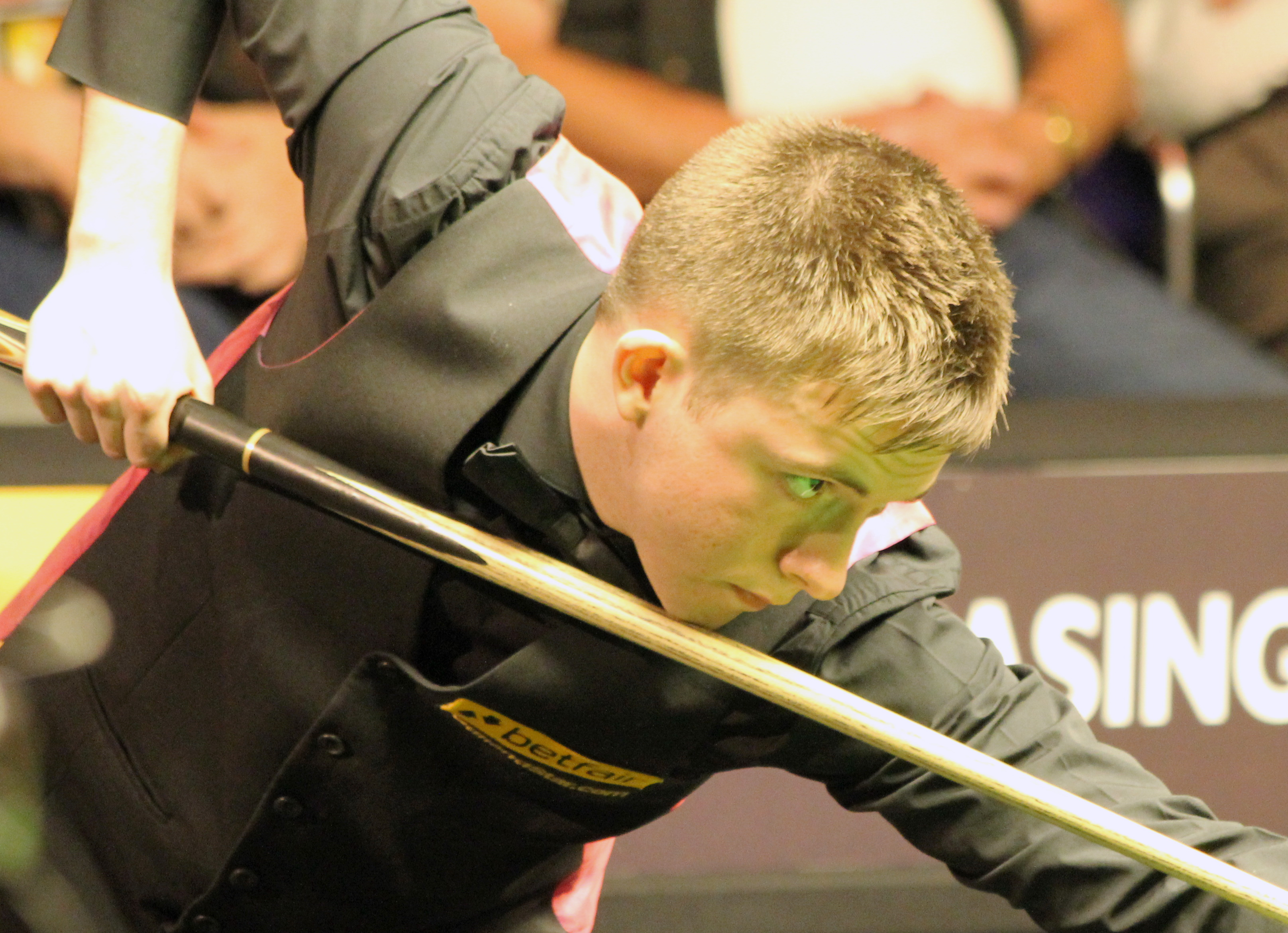
2012 Paul Hunter Classic

O'Sullivan turned professional after qualifying via Event 2 of the 2012 Q School and gained a two-year tour card for the 2012–13 and 2013–14 snooker seasons. In the event, he beat Christopher Keogan 4–1, Nick Dyson 4–0, Mohammed Al Shaikh from Bahrain 4–1 and Michael Wild 4–3, before seeing off Ryan Causton 4–1 in the quarter-finals.

=== Debut season ===
O'Sullivan lost his first nine matches as a professional, picking up his first victory in the minor-ranking European Tour Event 3 by beating David Gilbert 4–3, before losing 4–2 to Jimmy Robertson. The tournament formed part of the Players Tour Championship events, with O'Sullivan playing in all ten tournaments, finishing 98th on the Order of Merit.

His best run of results came in qualifying for the China Open, where he defeated Craig Steadman and Alfie Burden, but then lost 5–3 to Rory McLeod. O'Sullivan's season ended when he was beaten 10–6 by Michael Wasley in the first round of World Championship Qualifying. He finished his first year on tour ranked world number 91.

=== 2013/2014 season ===
O'Sullivan's only win at the venue stage of a ranking event during the 2013–14 season came at the UK Championship when he defeated Anthony Hamilton 6–4, before losing by a reverse of this scoreline to Noppon Saengkham in the second round. He dropped off the tour at the end of the season as he was ranked world number 102, well outside of the top 64 who retain their places. O'Sullivan entered Q School in a bid to win his place back, but lost in the last 32 in both events.

=== 2014/2015 season ===
At the Riga Open in August 2014, O'Sullivan reached his first quarter-final in a professional event with wins over Jamie Burnett, Mark Joyce, Jak Jones and Mark Davis, before he was beaten 4–0 by Mark Allen. He also played in all three of the Asian Tour events and, thanks to a last 16 showing in the Xuzhou Open, he finished 22nd on the Asian Order of Merit which has earned him a new two-year main snooker tour card for the 2015–16 and 2016–17 seasons.

=== 2015/2016 season ===
O'Sullivan dropped just two frames in reaching the last 16 of the Paul Hunter Classic where he lost 4–0 to Michael Holt. He would ultimately finish 38th on the European Order of Merit. In the main ranking events he qualified for the International Championship courtesy of a 6–3 win over Robin Hull, but lost 6–0 to Anthony McGill in the first round. O'Sullivan made five breaks of 50 or above to eliminate Kurt Maflin 6–3 in the first round of the UK Championship, before being defeated 6–4 by Matthew Selt. He could only win one more match after this and lost 10–5 to Ross Muir in the first round of World Championship qualifying.

=== 2016/2017 season ===
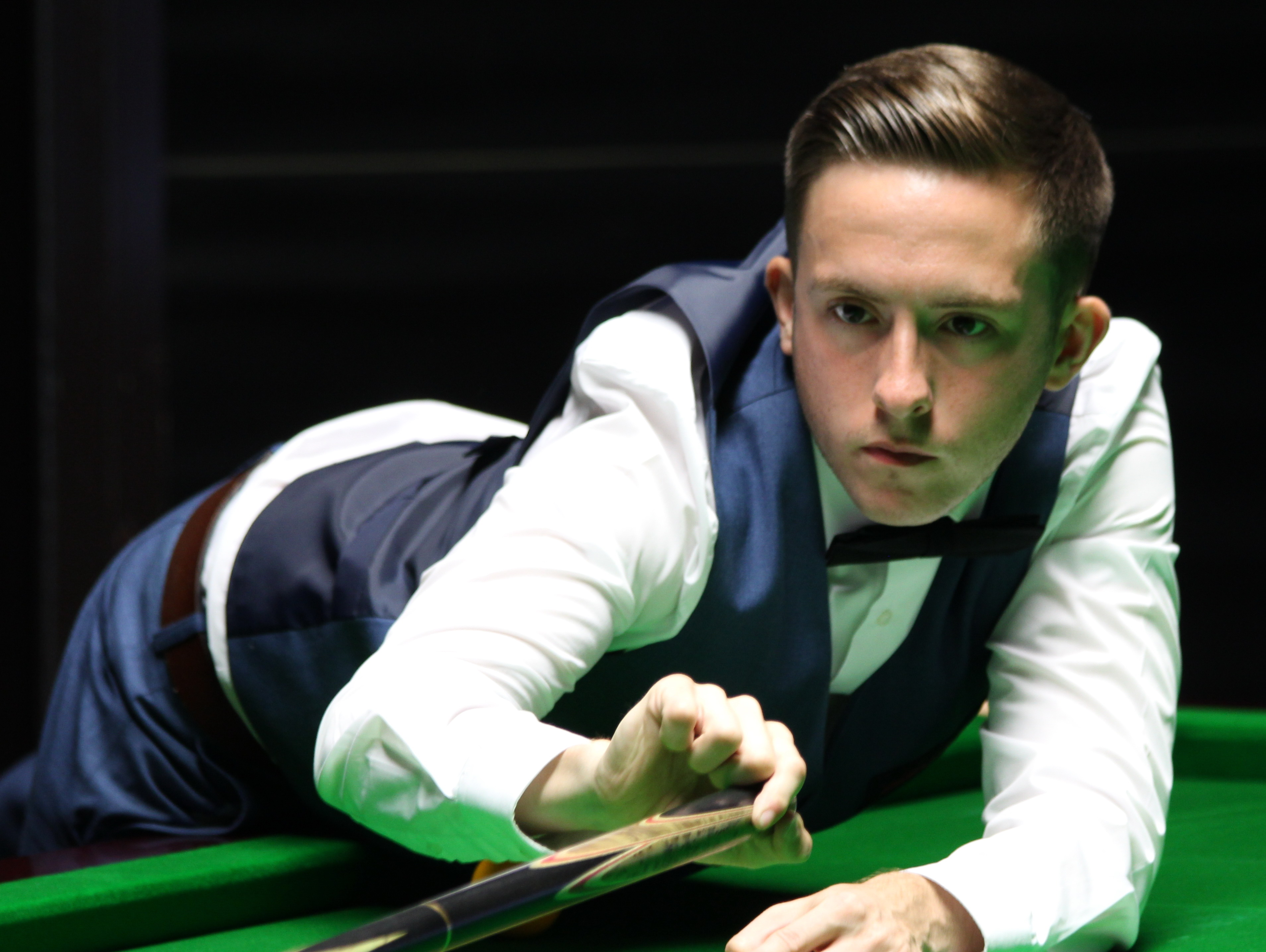
2016 Paul Hunter Classic

A 4–1 win over Yu Delu qualified O'Sullivan for the 2016 Riga Masters and he beat Luca Brecel 4–0, before being unable to pick up a frame himself in the second round against David Gilbert. After losing eight of his next nine matches he knocked out Robbie Williams, Mark King and Mitchell Mann at the Scottish Open all by 4–1 scorelines to reach the last 16 of a ranking event for the first time. O'Sullivan led Yu 3–2, but lost 4–3. O'Sullivan entered Q School at the end of the season in order to attempt to remain on the tour. He lost 4–0 to Allan Taylor in the final round of the first event and 4–3 to Paul Davison in the fourth round of the second, but had done enough to earn a new tour card through the Q School Order of Merit.

=== 2023/2024 season ===
O'Sullivan made his first ever career maximum at the 2023 European Masters in Germany in his Last 128 round against Barry Hawkins.

== Performance and rankings timeline ==
Tournament	2011/ 12	2012/ 13	2013/ 14	2014/ 15	2015/ 16	2016/ 17	2017/ 18	2018/ 19	2021/ 22	2022/ 23	2023/ 24	2026/ 27
Ranking (Note: It shows the ranking at the beginning of the season)	(Note: He was an amateur)	(Note: New players on the Main Tour don't have a ranking)	91			90	(Note: Players qualified through Q School started the season without prize money ranking points)	93			80	
Ranking tournaments
Championship League	Non-Ranking Event								A	RR	RR	RR
China Open	A	LQ	LQ	LQ	LQ	LQ	LQ	LQ	Not Held			LQ
Wuhan Open	Tournament Not Held										LQ	LQ
British Open	Tournament Not Held								A	LQ	LQ	1R
English Open	Tournament Not Held					1R	1R	1R	A	LQ	LQ	LQ
Shenzhen Open	Tournament Not Held											LQ
Northern Ireland Open	Tournament Not Held					1R	1R	2R	A	1R	2R	LQ
International Championship	NH	LQ	LQ	LQ	1R	LQ	LQ	LQ	Not Held		LQ	LQ
UK Championship	A	LQ	2R	A	2R	1R	1R	1R	A	LQ	LQ	LQ
Shoot Out	Non-Ranking Event					1R	3R	1R	A	1R	1R	
Scottish Open	NH	MR	Not Held			4R	1R	1R	A	1R	LQ	
German Masters	A	LQ	A	LQ	LQ	LQ	LQ	LQ	A	LQ	LQ	LQ
Welsh Open	A	LQ	1R	A	1R	2R	1R	1R	A	LQ	LQ	
World Grand Prix	Not Held			NR	DNQ	DNQ	DNQ	DNQ	DNQ	DNQ	DNQ	
Players Championship (Note: The event was called the Players Tour Championship Grand Final (2011/2012-2015/2016))	DNQ	DNQ	DNQ	DNQ	DNQ	DNQ	DNQ	DNQ	DNQ	DNQ	DNQ	
World Open	A	LQ	A	Not Held		LQ	LQ	LQ	Not Held		1R	
Tour Championship	Tournament Not Held							DNQ	DNQ	DNQ	DNQ	
World Championship	A	LQ	LQ	LQ	LQ	LQ	LQ	LQ	LQ	LQ	LQ	
Former ranking tournaments
Wuxi Classic	NR	LQ	LQ	LQ	Tournament Not Held							
Australian Goldfields Open	A	LQ	LQ	LQ	LQ	Tournament Not Held						
Shanghai Masters	A	LQ	LQ	A	LQ	LQ	LQ	NR	Not Held		Non-Ranking	
Riga Masters (Note: The event was called the Riga Open (2014/2015–2015/2016))	Not Held			MR		2R	LQ	LQ	Tournament Not Held			
Paul Hunter Classic	Minor-Ranking Event					1R	1R	1R	Tournament Not Held			
China Championship	Tournament Not Held					NR	LQ	LQ	Tournament Not Held			
Indian Open	Not Held		1R	LQ	NH	LQ	2R	LQ	Tournament Not Held			
Gibraltar Open	Tournament Not Held				MR	1R	2R	3R	A	Not Held		
WST Classic	Tournament Not Held									1R	Not Held	
European Masters	Tournament Not Held					LQ	LQ	LQ	A	1R	LQ	NH
Former non-ranking tournaments
Haining Open	Not Held			MR		4R	A	A	A	Not Held		
Six-red World Championship	NH	A	A	A	A	A	A	A	NH	LQ	Not Held	

Performance Table Legend
LQ	lost in the qualifying draw	#R	lost in the early rounds of the tournament (WR = Wildcard round, RR = Round robin)	QF	lost in the quarter-finals
SF	lost in the semi-finals	F	lost in the final	W	won the tournament
DNQ	did not qualify for the tournament	A	did not participate in the tournament	WD	withdrew from the tournament

NH / Not Held	means an event was not held.
NR / Non-Ranking Event	means an event is/was no longer a ranking event.
R / Ranking Event	means an event is/was a ranking event.
MR / Minor-Ranking Event	means an event is/was a minor-ranking event.

== Career finals ==
=== Amateur finals: 1 (1 title) ===
Outcome	No.	Year	Championship	Opponent in the final	Score
Winner	1.	2022	Q Tour – Event 3	(Belgium) Julien Leclercq	5–2
