= 2022–23 snooker season =

Series of snooker tournaments

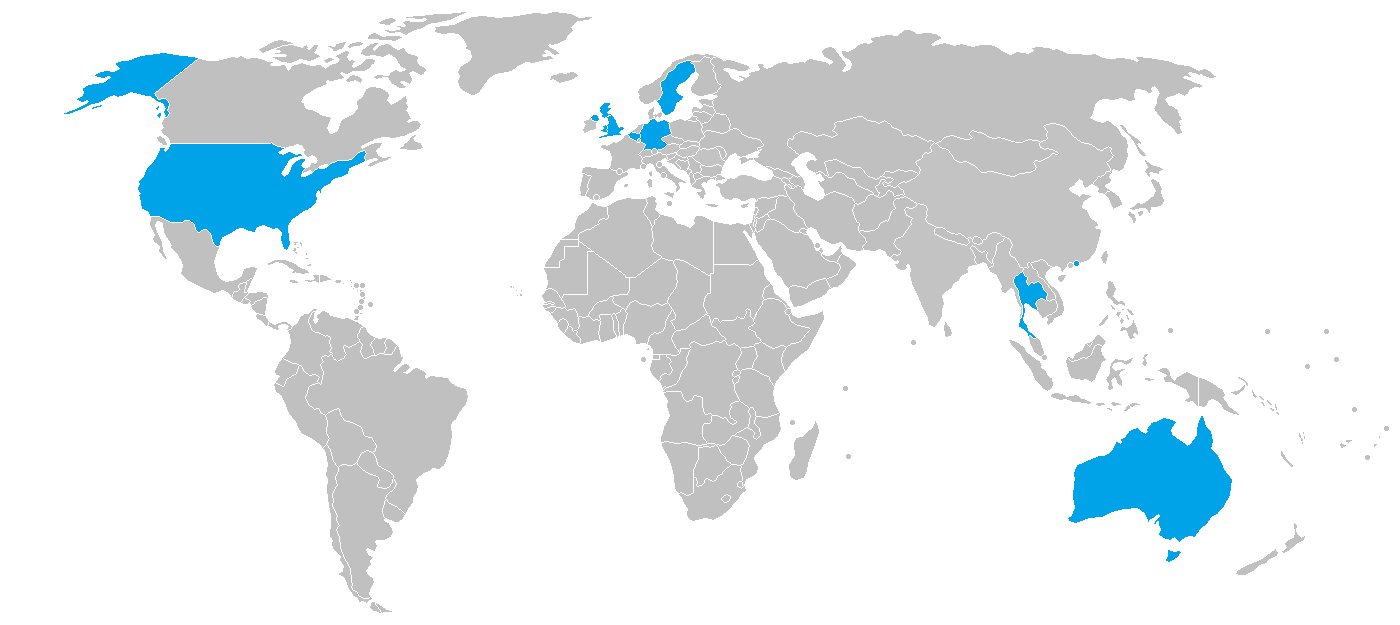
- Nations that hosted an event in the snooker calendar during the 2022–23 season

Details
- Duration: 28 June 2022 – 14 May 2023
- Tournaments: World Snooker Tour: 21 (15 ranking events); WPBSA Q Tour: 7 World Women's: 10; World Seniors: 1

Triple Crown winners
- UK Championship: Mark Allen (NIR)
- Masters: Judd Trump (ENG)
- World Championship: Luca Brecel (BEL)

The 2022–23 snooker season was a series of snooker tournaments played from June 2022 to May 2023.

== Players ==
The World Snooker Tour in the 2022–23 season initially consisted of a field of 131 professional players, but later dropped to 130 when Igor Figueiredo did not renew his WPBSA membership and fell off tour. The top 64 players from the prize money rankings after the 2022 World Championship, and 30 players earning a two-year card the previous year automatically qualify for the season. The other 36 tour cards are given to the following groups. Four places are allocated to the top four on the One Year Ranking List who have not already qualified for the Main Tour. Nine players from international championships and two players from the Q Tour are offered the tour cards. One player comes from the CBSA China Tour and two players from World Women's Snooker. 16 places are available through the Q School, four from each of the three UK events and two from each of the two Asia-Oceania Q School events). The last two tour cards are invitational tour cards, given to Stephen Hendry and Ken Doherty.

As one of the winners from the inaugural Q School Asia & Oceania qualification event, former professional player Thanawat Thirapongpaiboon was eligible to receive a fresh two-year tour card. However, on 22 June 2022, the WPBSA and the World Snooker Tour declined to offer him a tour card, citing "serious disciplinary matters from when Thanawat was previously a professional player in 2015" as the reason, later announced to be a resumption of a previous investigation into match-fixing that had been closed due to Thanawat having fallen off the tour at the time. His place was therefore offered to Asjad Iqbal, who was the next in line on the Asia-Oceania Q School Order of Merit.

=== New professional players ===
All players listed below received a tour card for two seasons.

Top 4 players from 2021/2022 One Year Ranking List

1. Ashley Hugill (ENG)
2. Michael White (WAL)
3. Allan Taylor (ENG)
4. David Lilley (ENG)

International Champions

5. WSF Open Champion: Si Jiahui (CHN)
6. WSF Junior Champion: Anton Kazakov (UKR)
7. EBSA European Champion (2021): Oliver Brown (ENG)
8. EBSA European Under-21 Champion (2021):Dylan Emery (WAL)
9. EBSA European Champion (2022): Andres Petrov (EST)
10. EBSA European Under-21 Champion (2022): Ben Mertens (BEL)
11. APSBF Asia Pacific Qualifier: Ryan Thomerson (AUS)
12. PABSA Americas Qualifier: Victor Sarkis (BRA)
13. ABSC African Qualifier: Mohamed Ibrahim (EGY)

Q Tour

14. Highest Ranked: Sean O'Sullivan (ENG)
15. Playoff: Julien Leclercq (BEL)

CBSA China Tour

16. Peng Yisong (CHN)

World Women's Snooker Qualifiers

17. Women's World Champion: Mink Nutcharut (THA)
18. Highest Ranked:Rebecca Kenna (ENG)

Invitational Tour Card

19. Stephen Hendry (SCO)
20. Ken Doherty (IRL)

Q School

Main article: 2022 Q School

Event 1

21. Rod Lawler (ENG)
22. Fergal O'Brien (IRL)
23. Andy Lee (HKG)
24. Bai Langning (CHN)

Event 2

25. Adam Duffy (ENG)
26. Zak Surety (ENG)
27. Aaron Hill (IRL)
28. Sanderson Lam (ENG)

Event 3

29. Lukas Kleckers (GER)
30. Jenson Kendrick (ENG)
31. John Astley (ENG)
32. James Cahill (ENG)

Asia-Oceania Event 1

33. Muhammad Asif (PAK)

Asia-Oceania Event 2

34. Dechawat Poomjaeng (THA)
35. Himanshu Jain (IND)

Asia-Oceania Order of Merit

36. Asjad Iqbal (PAK)

== Calendar ==
The following tables outline the dates and results for all the World Snooker Tour, World Women's Snooker Tour, World Seniors Tour, Q Tour, and other events in the season.

=== World Snooker Tour ===
Start	Finish	Tournament	Venue	Winner	Score	Runner-up	Ref.
28 Jun	29 Jul	Championship League	Morningside Arena in Leicester, England	Luca Brecel (BEL)	3‍–‍1	Lu Ning (CHN)	
16 Aug	21 Aug	European Masters	Stadthalle Fürth in Fürth, Germany	Kyren Wilson (ENG)	9‍–‍3	Barry Hawkins (ENG)	
24 Sep	25 Sep	World Mixed Doubles^{†}	Marshall Arena in Milton Keynes, England	Neil Robertson (AUS); Mink Nutcharut (THA)	4‍–‍2	Mark Selby (ENG); Rebecca Kenna (ENG)	
26 Sep	2 Oct	British Open	Marshall Arena in Milton Keynes, England	Ryan Day (WAL)	10‍–‍7	Mark Allen (NIR)	
6 Oct	9 Oct	Hong Kong Masters^{†}	Hong Kong Coliseum in Hong Kong	Ronnie O'Sullivan (ENG)	6‍–‍4	Marco Fu (HKG)	
16 Oct	23 Oct	Northern Ireland Open	Waterfront Hall in Belfast, Northern Ireland	Mark Allen (NIR)	9‍–‍4	Zhou Yuelong (CHN)	
31 Oct	6 Nov	Champion of Champions^{†}	Bolton Whites Hotel in Bolton, England	Ronnie O'Sullivan (ENG)	10‍–‍6	Judd Trump (ENG)	
12 Nov	20 Nov	UK Championship	York Barbican in York, England	Mark Allen (NIR)	10‍–‍7	Ding Junhui (CHN)	
28 Nov	4 Dec	Scottish Open	Meadowbank Sports Centre in Edinburgh, Scotland	Gary Wilson (ENG)	9‍–‍2	Joe O'Connor (ENG)	
12 Dec	18 Dec	English Open	Brentwood Centre in Brentwood, England	Mark Selby (ENG)	9‍–‍6	Luca Brecel (BEL)	
8 Jan	15 Jan	Masters^{†}	Alexandra Palace in London, England	Judd Trump (ENG)	10‍–‍8	Mark Williams (WAL)	
16 Jan	22 Jan	World Grand Prix	The Centaur in Cheltenham, England	Mark Allen (NIR)	10‍–‍9	Judd Trump (ENG)	
25 Jan	28 Jan	Shoot Out	Morningside Arena in Leicester, England	Chris Wakelin (ENG)	1‍–‍0	Julien Leclercq (BEL)	
1 Feb	5 Feb	German Masters	Tempodrom in Berlin, Germany	Ali Carter (ENG)	10‍–‍3	Tom Ford (ENG)	
13 Feb	19 Feb	Welsh Open	Venue Cymru in Llandudno, Wales	Robert Milkins (ENG)	9‍–‍7	Shaun Murphy (ENG)	
20 Feb	26 Feb	Players Championship	Aldersley Leisure Village in Wolverhampton, England	Shaun Murphy (ENG)	10‍–‍4	Ali Carter (ENG)	
19 Dec	2 Mar	Championship League Invitational^{†}	Morningside Arena in Leicester, England	John Higgins (SCO)	3‍–‍1	Judd Trump (ENG)	
6 Mar	11 Mar	Six-red World Championship^{†}	Thammasat University Convention Centre in Pathum Thani, Thailand	Ding Junhui (CHN)	8‍–‍6	Thepchaiya Un-Nooh (THA)	
13 Mar	19 Mar	Turkish Masters^{‡}	Nirvana Cosmopolitan Hotel, Antalya, Turkey	Cancelled due to lack of funding from promoter			
16 Mar	22 Mar	WST Classic	Morningside Arena in Leicester, England	Mark Selby (ENG)	6‍–‍2	Pang Junxu (CHN)	
27 Mar	2 Apr	Tour Championship	Bonus Arena in Hull, England	Shaun Murphy (ENG)	10‍–‍7	Kyren Wilson (ENG)	
15 Apr	1 May	World Championship	Crucible Theatre in Sheffield, England	Luca Brecel (BEL)	18‍–‍15	Mark Selby (ENG)	

Ranking event
^{†} Non-ranking event
^{‡} Cancelled event

European Series champion and Betvictor bonus winner: Robert Milkins (ENG)

=== World Women's Snooker ===
Start	Finish	Tournament	Venue	Winner	Score	Runner-up	Ref.
30 Jul	31 Jul	UK Women's Championship	Northern Snooker Centre in Leeds, England	Reanne Evans (ENG)	4‍–‍3	Ng On-yee (HKG)	
26 Aug	28 Aug	US Women's Open	OX Billiards in Seattle, Washington, United States	Jamie Hunter (ENG)	4‍–‍1	Rebecca Kenna (ENG)	
1 Oct	4 Oct	Australian Women's Open	Mounties in Sydney, Australia	Jamie Hunter (ENG)	4‍–‍3	Jessica Woods (AUS)	
22 Oct	23 Oct	Scottish Women's Open	The Q Club in Glasgow, Scotland	Reanne Evans (ENG)	4‍–‍2	Mink Nutcharut (THA)	
26 Nov	27 Nov	Eden Women's Masters	Frames Sports Bar in London, England	Mink Nutcharut (THA)	4‍–‍0	Ng On-yee (HKG)	
20 Jan	22 Jan	Belgian Women's Open	The Trickshot in Bruges, Belgium	Mink Nutcharut (THA)	4‍–‍1	Wendy Jans (BEL)	
31 Jan	3 Feb	Asia-Pacific Women's Championship	Mounties in Sydney, Australia	Ploychompoo Laokiatphong (THA)	4‍–‍1	Siripaporn Nuanthakhamjan (THA)	
25 Feb	27 Feb	Women's Snooker World Cup†	Hi-End Snooker Club in Bangkok, Thailand	India 1	4‍–‍3	England 1	
28 Feb	4 Mar	World Women's Championship	Hi-End Snooker Club in Bangkok, Thailand	Siripaporn Nuanthakhamjan (THA)	6‍–‍3	Bai Yulu (CHN)	
13 May	14 May	Women's British Open	Landywood Snooker Club in Great Wyrley, England	Bai Yulu (CHN)	4‍–‍3	Reanne Evans (ENG)	

Individual event
† Team event

=== World Seniors Tour ===
Start	Finish	Tournament	Venue	Winner	Score	Runner-up	Ref.
3 May	7 May	World Seniors Championship	Crucible Theatre in Sheffield, England	Jimmy White (ENG)	5‍–‍3	Alfie Burden (ENG)	

=== Q-Tour ===
Start	Finish	Tournament	Venue	Winner	Score	Runner-up	Ref.
2 Sep	4 Sep	Q Tour 1	North East Snooker Centre in North Shields, England	Ross Muir (SCO)	5‍–‍2	George Pragnell (ENG)	
16 Sep	18 Sep	Q Tour 2	Castle Snooker Club in Brighton, England	Martin O'Donnell (ENG)	5‍–‍1	George Pragnell (ENG)	
14 Oct	16 Oct	Q Tour 3	Delta Moon in Mons, Belgium	Farakh Ajaib (PAK)	5‍–‍3	Harvey Chandler (ENG)	
25 Nov	27 Nov	Q Tour 4	Snookerhallen in Stockholm, Sweden	Billy Castle (ENG)	5‍–‍4	Andrew Higginson (ENG)	
9 Dec	11 Dec	Q Tour 5	Landywood Snooker Club in Great Wyrley, England	Daniel Wells (WAL)	5‍–‍2	Sydney Wilson (ENG)	
6 Jan	8 Jan	Q Tour 6	Northern Snooker Centre in Leeds, England	Martin O'Donnell (ENG)	5‍–‍1	Ross Muir (SCO)	
4 Mar	5 Mar	Q Tour Playoff	Q House Academy in Darlington, England	Ashley Carty (ENG)	5‍–‍2	Florian Nuessle (AUT)	

=== Other events ===
Start	Finish	Tournament	Venue	Winner	Score	Runner-up	Ref.
17 May	21 May	Haining Open	Hainging Sports Center, Haining China	Yuan Sijun (CHN)	5‍–‍1	Wu Yize (CHN)	
13 Jul	17 Jul	World Games	Sheraton Hotel, Birmingham, Alabama, United States	Cheung Ka Wai (HKG)	3‍–‍1	Abdelrahman Shahin (EGY)	
7 May	14 May	SEA Games – Singles	Aeon 2, Sen Sok City, Phnom Penh, Cambodia	Thor Chuan Leong (MYS)	4‍–‍1	Sunny Akani (THA)	
7 May	14 May	SEA Games – Six-red singles	Aeon 2, Sen Sok City, Phnom Penh, Cambodia	Moh Keen Ho (MYS)	5‍–‍3	Sitthideth Sabieng (LAO)	

== World ranking points ==
Round Tournament	R144	R128	R112	R96	R80	R64	R48	R32	R24	R16	QF	R6	SF	F	W
Championship League	—N/a	0 (Note: First stage fourth-placed)	—N/a	1,000 (Note: First stage third-placed)	—N/a	2,000 (Note: First stage runner-up)	—N/a	4,000 (Note: Second stage fourth-placed)	5,000 (Note: Second stage third-placed)	6,000 (Note: Second stage runner-up)	8,000 (Note: Third stage fourth-placed)	9,000 (Note: Third stage third-placed)	11,000 (Note: Third stage runner-up)	23,000	33,000
European Masters	—N/a	0	—N/a	—N/a	—N/a	3,000	—N/a	4,500	—N/a	7,500	11,000	—N/a	17,500	35,000	80,000
British Open	—N/a	0	—N/a	—N/a	—N/a	3,000	—N/a	5,000	—N/a	8,000	12,000	—N/a	20,000	45,000	100,000
Northern Ireland Open	—N/a	0	—N/a	—N/a	—N/a	3,000	—N/a	4,500	—N/a	7,500	11,000	—N/a	17,500	35,000	80,000
UK Championship	0	—N/a	2,500 (Note: Players who lose their first match receive no ranking points.)	—N/a	5,000	—N/a	7,500	10,000	—N/a	15,000	25,000	—N/a	50,000	100,000	250,000
Scottish Open	—N/a	0	—N/a	—N/a	—N/a	3,000	—N/a	4,500	—N/a	7,500	11,000	—N/a	17,500	35,000	80,000
English Open	—N/a	0	—N/a	—N/a	—N/a	3,000	—N/a	4,500	—N/a	7,500	11,000	—N/a	17,500	35,000	80,000
World Grand Prix	—N/a	—N/a	—N/a	—N/a	—N/a	—N/a	—N/a	5,000	—N/a	7,500	12,500	—N/a	20,000	40,000	100,000
Shoot Out	—N/a	0	—N/a	—N/a	—N/a	500	—N/a	1,000	—N/a	2,000	4,000	—N/a	8,000	20,000	50,000
German Masters	—N/a	0 (Note: Loss in first qualifying round)	—N/a	—N/a	—N/a	3,000 (Note: Loss in second qualifying round)	—N/a	4,500	—N/a	7,500	11,000	—N/a	17,500	35,000	80,000
Welsh Open	—N/a	0	—N/a	—N/a	—N/a	3,000	—N/a	4,500	—N/a	7,500	11,000	—N/a	17,500	35,000	80,000
Players Championship	—N/a	—N/a	—N/a	—N/a	—N/a	—N/a	—N/a	—N/a	—N/a	10,000	15,000	—N/a	30,000	50,000	125,000
WST Classic	—N/a	0	—N/a	—N/a	—N/a	3,000	—N/a	4,500	—N/a	7,500	11,000	—N/a	17,500	35,000	80,000
Tour Championship	—N/a	—N/a	—N/a	—N/a	—N/a	—N/a	—N/a	—N/a	—N/a	—N/a	20,000	—N/a	40,000	60,000	150,000
World Championship	0	—N/a	5,000	—N/a	10,000	—N/a	15,000	20,000	—N/a	30,000	50,000	—N/a	100,000	200,000	500,000
