= 2023 Six-red World Championship =

Snooker tournament

2023 Pathum Thani Six-red World Championship
Tournament information
- Dates: 6–11 March 2023
- Venue: Thammasat University Convention Centre
- City: Pathum Thani
- Country: Thailand
- Organisation: World Snooker Tour
- Format: Six-red snooker
- Total prize fund: 11,000,000 baht
- Winner's share: 4,200,000 baht
- Highest break: Matthew Selt (ENG) (80)

Final
- Champion: Ding Junhui (CHN)
- Runner-up: Thepchaiya Un-Nooh (THA)
- Score: 8–6

The 2023 Pathum Thani Six-red World Championship was a non-ranking six-red snooker tournament held from 6 to 11 March 2023 at the Thammasat University Convention Centre in Pathum Thani, Thailand. The event was originally scheduled for September 2022, but was postponed until March 2023. A qualification round was played prior to the tournament with four players qualifying to the 32 player field.

Stephen Maguire was the defending champion, having won the previous championship in September 2019, but he was eliminated in the group stage. Ding Junhui won the event for the second time, beating Thepchaiya Un-Nooh 8–6 in the final.

== Prize fund ==
A breakdown of the prize money awarded is shown below.

- Winner = £100,800
- Runner-up = £31,200
- Semi-final = £18,000
- Quarter-final = £9,000
- Last 16 = £3,600

== Results ==
=== Group stage ===
==== Group A ====
Position	Player	MP	MW	ML	FW	FL	FD
1	Zhang Anda (CHN)	3	3	0	15	4	+11
2	Ding Junhui (CHN)	3	2	1	10	9	+1
3	Stephen Maguire (SCO)	3	1	2	9	10	-1
4	Mink Nutcharut (THA)	3	0	3	4	15	-11

- Ding Junhui 5–2 Stephen Maguire
- Zhang Anda 5–2 Mink Nutcharut
- Zhang Anda 5–2 Stephen Maguire
- Ding Junhui 5–2 Mink Nutcharut
- Zhang Anda 5–0 Ding Junhui
- Stephen Maguire 5–0 Mink Nutcharut

==== Group B ====
Position	Player	MP	MW	ML	FW	FL	FD
1	Thepchaiya Un-Nooh (THA)	3	3	0	15	5	+10
2	Tom Ford (ENG)	3	1	2	11	11	0
3	Zhou Yuelong (CHN)	3	1	2	8	11	-3
4	Jimmy White (ENG)	3	1	2	6	13	-7

- Thepchaiya Un-Nooh 5–0 Jimmy White
- Tom Ford 5–1 Zhou Yuelong
- Zhou Yuelong 5–1 Jimmy White
- Thepchaiya Un-Nooh 5–3 Tom Ford
- Thepchaiya Un-Nooh 5–2 Zhou Yuelong
- Jimmy White 5–3 Tom Ford

==== Group C ====
Position	Player	MP	MW	ML	FW	FL	FD
1	Hossein Vafaei (IRN)	3	3	0	15	4	+11
2	John Higgins (SCO)	3	2	1	11	7	+4
3	Poramin Danjirkul (THA)	3	1	2	7	13	-6
4	Ken Doherty (IRL)	3	0	3	6	15	-9

- John Higgins 5–2 Ken Doherty
- Hossein Vafaei 5–2 Poramin Danjirakul
- Hossein Vafaei 5–1 John Higgins
- Pormin Danjirakul 5–3 Ken Doherty
- John Higgins 5–0 Poramin Danjirakul
- Hossein Vafaei 5–1 Ken Doherty

==== Group D ====
Position	Player	MP	MW	ML	FW	FL	FD
1	Judd Trump (ENG)	3	3	0	15	8	+7
2	Ricky Walden (ENG)	3	2	1	10	10	0
3	Ma Hai Long (CHN)	3	1	2	10	13	-3
4	Kritsanut Lertsattayathorn (THA)	3	0	3	11	15	-4

- Judd Trump 5–0 Ricky Walden
- Ma Hai Long 5–3 Kritsanut Lertsattayathorn
- Judd Trump 5–4 Kritsanut Lertsattayathorn
- Ricky Walden 5–1 Ma Hailong
- Judd Trump 5–4 Ma Hailong
- Ricky Walden 5–4 Kritsanut Lertsattayathorn

==== Group E ====
Position	Player	MP	MW	ML	FW	FL	FD
1	Chris Wakelin (ENG)	3	3	0	15	11	+4
2	Dechawat Poomjaeng (THA)	3	1	2	12	10	+2
3	Matthew Selt (ENG)	3	1	2	11	13	-2
4	Robert Milkins (ENG)	3	1	2	8	12	-4

- Robert Milkins 5–2 Matthew Selt
- Chris Wakelin 5–4 Dechawat Poomjaeng
- Chris Wakelin 5–4 Matthew Selt
- Dechawat Poomjaeng 5–0 Robert Milkins
- Chris Wakelin 5–3 Robert Milkins
- Matthew Selt 5–3 Dechawat Poomjaeng

==== Group F ====
Position	Player	MP	MW	ML	FW	FL	FD
1	Joe Perry (ENG)	3	3	0	15	8	+7
2	Mark Williams (WAL)	3	2	1	12	11	+1
3	Andres Petrov (EST)	3	1	2	10	13	-3
4	Sunny Akani (THA)	3	0	3	10	15	-5

- Joe Perry 5–1 Mark Williams
- Andres Petrov 5–3 Sunny Akani
- Mark Williams 5–4 Sunny Akani
- Joe Perry 5–3 Andres Petrov
- Mark Williams 5–2 Andres Petrov
- Joe Perry 5–3 Sunny Akani

==== Group G ====
Position	Player	MP	MW	ML	FW	FL	FD
1	Stuart Bingham (ENG)	3	3	0	15	4	+11
2	Noppon Saengkham (THA)	3	2	1	11	10	+1
3	Jordan Brown (NIR)	3	1	2	11	12	-1
4	Mahmoud El Hareedy (EGY)	3	0	3	4	15	-11

- Noppon Saengkham 5–4 Jordan Brown
- Stuart Bingham 5–1 Mahoud El Hareedy
- Stuart Bingham 5–2 Jordan Brown
- Noppon Saengkham 5–1 Mahoud El Hareedy
- Jordan Brown 5–2 Mahoud El Hareedy
- Stuart Bingham 5–1 Noppon Saengkham

==== Group H ====
Position	Player	MP	MW	ML	FW	FL	FD
1	Ronnie O'Sullivan (ENG)	3	3	0	15	7	+8
2	James Wattana (THA)	3	2	1	12	10	+2
3	Jimmy Robertson (ENG)	3	1	2	12	12	0
4	Stan Moody (ENG)	3	0	3	5	15	-10

- Ronnie O'Sullivan 5–3 Jimmy Robertson
- James Wattana 5–1 Stan Moody
- Ronnie O'Sullivan 5–2 Stan Moody
- James Wattana 5–4 Jimmy Robertson
- Jimmy Robertson 5–2 Stan Moody
- Ronnie O'Sullivan 5–2 James Wattana

=== Knockout stage ===
Last 16; Best of 11 frames
(China) Zhang Anda	6
(Thailand) James Wattana	4
(Thailand) Thepchaiya Un-Nooh	6
(Thailand) Dechawat Poomjaeng	2
(Iran) Hossein Vafaei	6
(Thailand) Noppon Saengkham	3
(England) Judd Trump	6
(Wales) Mark Williams	3
(England) Chris Wakelin	3
(England) Tom Ford	6
(England) Joe Perry	2
(Scotland) John Higgins	6
(England) Stuart Bingham	6
(England) Ricky Walden	0
(England) Ronnie O'Sullivan	2
(China) Ding Junhui	6

Quarter-finals; Best of 11 frames
(China) Zhang Anda	2
(Thailand) Thepchaiya Un-Nooh	6
(Iran) Hossein Vafaei	6
(England) Judd Trump	5
(England) Tom Ford	6
(Scotland) John Higgins	5
(England) Stuart Bingham	2
(China) Ding Junhui	6

Semi-finals; Best of 13 frames
(Thailand) Thepchaiya Un-Nooh	7
(Iran) Hossein Vafaei	6
(England) Tom Ford	4
(China) Ding Junhui	7

Final; Best of 15 frames
(Thailand) Thepchaiya Un-Nooh	6
(China) Ding Junhui	8

==== Final ====
Final: Best of 15 frames. Referee: Tawich Kongdee; Thammasat University Convention Centre, Pathum Thani, Thailand, 11 March 2023
Thepchaiya Un-Nooh; Thailand	6–8	Ding Junhui; China
Frame scores: 0–72 (72), 0–71 (71), 53–1 (52), 34–20, 2–35, 0–46, 1–40, 34–12, 40–12, 10–37, 29–34, 35–25, 41–17, 1–38
52	Highest Break	72
1	50+ Breaks	2

== Qualifying ==
Qualifying for the event took place from 7 to 9 January 2023 at the Metrodome in Barnsley, England. Four players qualified for the final stage in Thailand, one from each quarter of the draw. Eight players received byes to Round 2. Ricky Walden later got an automatic place in the main event draw as a top 16 player pulled out.

=== First quarter ===
Round 1 Best of 11 frames
Robbie Williams (ENG)	6
Rebecca Kenna (ENG)	1
Mark Joyce (ENG)	6
Daan Leyssen (BEL)	1
Sanderson Lam (ENG)	5
Michael White (WAL)	6
Xiao Guodong (CHN)	6
David Lilley (ENG)	5
Rodion Judin (LAT)	2
Asjad Iqbal (PAK)	6
Liam Highfield (ENG)	6
Hammad Miah (ENG)	5
Ng On-yee (HKG)	4
Tian Pengfei (CHN)	6
Umut Dikme (GER)	w/o
Zhang Jiankang (CHN)	w/d
Jamie Clarke (WAL)	6
Allan Taylor (ENG)	1
Mickey Joyce (ENG)	0
Lei Peifan (CHN)	6
Robert Milkins (ENG)	2
Zhang Anda (CHN)	6
Louis Heathcote (ENG)	w/o
Andy Hicks (ENG)	w/d
Anthony Hamilton (ENG)	6
Duane Jones (WAL)	2
Lukas Kleckers (GER)	6
Jack Harris (ENG)	5

Round 2 Best of 11 frames
(England) Ricky Walden	w/d
(England) Robbie Williams	w/o
(England) Mark Joyce	5
(Wales) Michael White	6
(China) Xiao Guodong	6
(Pakistan) Asjad Iqbal	2
(England) Liam Highfield	2
(China) Tian Pengfei	6
(Germany) Umut Dikme	2
(Wales) Jamie Clarke	6
(China) Lei Peifan	3
(China) Zhang Anda	6
(England) Louis Heathcote	5
(England) Anthony Hamilton	6
(Germany) Lukas Kleckers	6
(England) Joe Perry	4

Round 3 Best of 11 frames
(England) Robbie Williams	6
(Wales) Michael White	5
(China) Xiao Guodong	6
(China) Tian Pengfei	1
(Wales) Jamie Clarke	3
(China) Zhang Anda	6
(England) Anthony Hamilton	5
(Germany) Lukas Kleckers	6

Round 4 Best of 11 frames
(England) Robbie Williams	6
(China) Xiao Guodong	2
(China) Zhang Anda	6
(Germany) Lukas Kleckers	2

Round 5 Best of 11 frames
(England) Robbie Williams	3
(China) Zhang Anda	6

=== Second quarter ===
Round 1 Best of 11 frames
Jenson Kendrick (ENG)	1
Ben Mertens (BEL)	6
Mark Davis (ENG)	6
Alexander Ursenbacher (CHE)	5
Ian Martin (ENG)	w/o
Heather Clare (ENG)	w/d
Jamie Jones (WAL)	6
Gerard Greene (NIR)	2
Fergal Quinn (NIR)	6
Dylan Smith (ENG)	1
Lyu Haotian (CHN)	3
Peng Yisong (CHN)	6
Barry Pinches (ENG)	6
Andrew Pagett (WAL)	2
Ashley Hugill (ENG)	6
Phil O'Kane (ENG)	5
Chris Wakelin (ENG)	w/o
Brian Ochoiski (FRA)	w/d
Oliver Brown (ENG)	6
Xu Si (CHN)	5
Gary Wilson (ENG)	6
Anton Kazakov (UKR)	1
Jamie O'Neill (ENG)	6
Martyn Taylor (ENG)	4
David Grace (ENG)	3
Cao Yupeng (CHN)	6
Mark Lloyd (ENG)	1
Reanne Evans (ENG)	6

Round 2 Best of 11 frames
(Northern Ireland) Jordan Brown	2
(Belgium) Ben Mertens	6
(England) Mark Davis	6
(England) Ian Martin	1
(Wales) Jamie Jones	6
(Northern Ireland) Fergal Quinn	1
(China) Peng Yisong	6
(England) Barry Pinches	5
(England) Ashley Hugill	5
(England) Chris Wakelin	6
(England) Oliver Brown	2
(England) Gary Wilson	6
(England) Jamie O'Neill	1
(China) Cao Yupeng	6
(England) Reanne Evans	5
(England) Matthew Selt	6

Round 3 Best of 11 frames
(Belgium) Ben Mertens	6
(England) Mark Davis	0
(Wales) Jamie Jones	6
(China) Peng Yisong	4
(England) Chris Wakelin	6
(England) Gary Wilson	5
(China) Cao Yupeng	6
(England) Matthew Selt	5

Round 4 Best of 11 frames
(Belgium) Ben Mertens	6
(Wales) Jamie Jones	5
(England) Chris Wakelin	6
(China) Cao Yupeng	5

Round 5 Best of 11 frames
(Belgium) Ben Mertens	2
(England) Chris Wakelin	6

=== Third quarter ===
Round 1 Best of 11 frames
Patrick Whelan (ENG)	w/d
Rod Lawler (ENG)	w/o
Matthew Stevens (WAL)	4
Elliot Slessor (ENG)	6
Peter Devlin (ENG)	w/d
John Fearick (ENG)	w/o
Graeme Dott (SCO)	w/o
Alfie Burden (ENG)	w/d
Ben Fortey (WAL)	6
Yuan Sijun (CHN)	1
Ben Woollaston (ENG)	6
Dylan Emery (WAL)	4
Ian Burns (ENG)	6
Adam Duffy (ENG)	2
Jackson Page (WAL)	6
Alfie Lee (ENG)	3
Scott Donaldson (SCO)	6
Andy Milliard (ENG)	1
Leo Fernandez (IRL)	2
Peter Lines (ENG)	6
Tom Ford (ENG)	6
Jack Bradford (WAL)	3
Sean McAllister (ENG)	3
John Astley (ENG)	6
Pang Junxu (CHN)	w/o
Lewis Ullah (ENG)	w/d
Si Jiahui (CHN)	6
James Cahill (ENG)	3

Round 2 Best of 11 frames
(England) Ali Carter	6
(England) Rod Lawler	2
(England) Elliot Slessor	6
(England) John Fearick	1
(Scotland) Graeme Dott	6
(Wales) Ben Fortey	2
(England) Ben Woollaston	6
(England) Ian Burns	4
(Wales) Jackson Page	6
(Scotland) Scott Donaldson	4
(England) Peter Lines	4
(England) Tom Ford	6
(England) John Astley	4
(China) Pang Junxu	6
(China) Si Jiahui	4
(China) Zhou Yuelong	6

Round 3 Best of 11 frames
(England) Ali Carter	6
(England) Elliot Slessor	2
(Scotland) Graeme Dott	4
(England) Ben Woollaston	6
(Wales) Jackson Page	2
(England) Tom Ford	6
(China) Pang Junxu	5
(China) Zhou Yuelong	6

Round 4 Best of 11 frames
(England) Ali Carter	6
(England) Ben Woollaston	3
(England) Tom Ford	1
(China) Zhou Yuelong	6

Round 5 Best of 11 frames
(England) Ali Carter	6
(China) Zhou Yuelong	1

=== Fourth quarter ===
Round 1 Best of 11 frames
Michael Judge (IRL)	1
Sean O'Sullivan (ENG)	6
Mark King (ENG)	w/o
Stuart Carrington (ENG)	w/d
Mitchell Mann (ENG)	6
Himanshu Dinesh Jain (IND)	0
Ryan Day (WAL)	2
Fraser Patrick (SCO)	6
Chen Zifan (CHN)	w/d
Dean Young (SCO)	w/o
Joe O'Connor (ENG)	6
Marco Fu (HKG)	5
Zak Surety (ENG)	4
Craig Steadman (ENG)	6
Ryan Thomerson (AUS)	6
Rodney Goggins (IRL)	4
Jak Jones (WAL)	w/o
Stephen Hendry (SCO)	w/d
Jamie Wilson (ENG)	5
Wu Yize (CHN)	6
Fan Zhengyi (CHN)	6
Saqib Nasir (ENG)	2
Andy Lee (HKG)	6
Victor Sarkis (BRA)	3
Oliver Lines (ENG)	6
Muhammad Asif (PAK)	4
Mohamed Ibrahim (EGY)	1
Aaron Hill (IRL)	6

Round 2 Best of 11 frames
(England) Jimmy Robertson	6
(England) Sean O'Sullivan	2
(England) Mark King	6
(England) Mitchell Mann	4
(Scotland) Fraser Patrick	6
(Scotland) Dean Young	3
(England) Joe O'Connor	6
(England) Craig Steadman	4
(Australia) Ryan Thomerson	0
(Wales) Jak Jones	6
(China) Wu Yize	4
(China) Fan Zhengyi	6
(Hong Kong) Andy Lee	6
(England) Oliver Lines	4
(Republic of Ireland) Aaron Hill	w/o
(England) David Gilbert	w/d

Round 3 Best of 11 frames
(England) Jimmy Robertson	6
(England) Mark King	4
(Scotland) Fraser Patrick	6
(England) Joe O'Connor	4
(Wales) Jak Jones	5
(China) Fan Zhengyi	6
(Hong Kong) Andy Lee	4
(Republic of Ireland) Aaron Hill	6

Round 4 Best of 11 frames
(England) Jimmy Robertson	6
(Scotland) Fraser Patrick	2
(China) Fan Zhengyi	4
(Republic of Ireland) Aaron Hill	6

Round 5 Best of 11 frames
(England) Jimmy Robertson	6
(Republic of Ireland) Aaron Hill	3

== Maximum breaks ==
(Note: A maximum break in six-red is 75)

=== Main stage ===
- Matthew Selt (80)

=== Qualifying stage ===
- Andy Lee
- Jackson Page
- Peng Yisong
- Zhou Yuelong
