= 2023 German Masters =

Snooker tournament

2023 BetVictor German Masters
Tournament information
- Dates: 1–5 February 2023
- Venue: Tempodrom
- City: Berlin
- Country: Germany
- Organisation: World Snooker Tour
- Format: Ranking event
- Total prize fund: £427,000
- Winner's share: £80,000
- Highest break: Robert Milkins (ENG) (147)

Final
- Champion: Ali Carter (ENG)
- Runner-up: Tom Ford (ENG)
- Score: 10–3

The 2023 German Masters (officially the 2023 BetVictor German Masters) was a professional snooker tournament that took place from 1 to 5 February 2023 at the Tempodrom in Berlin, Germany. Organised by the World Snooker Tour and sponsored by sports betting company BetVictor, the tournament was the tenth ranking event of the 2022–23 snooker season and the seventh of the eight events in the European Series. The 17th edition of the German Masters, first held in 1995 as the German Open, the tournament was broadcast by Eurosport in Europe and by multiple other broadcasters internationally. The winner received £80,000 from a total prize fund of £427,000.

The reigning world champion and world number one Ronnie O'Sullivan withdrew from the tournament and was replaced by Ross Muir. Many other highly ranked players—including Mark Allen, Stuart Bingham, Ryan Day, Ding Junhui, Barry Hawkins, John Higgins, Shaun Murphy, Mark Selby, Judd Trump, and Mark Williams—lost in the qualifying rounds, which were held from 21 to 26 November 2022 at the Morningside Arena in Leicester, England. In December 2022 and January 2023, amid a match-fixing investigation, the sport's governing body suspended four players who had qualified: Li Hang, Zhao Jianbo, and the previous year's finalists Yan Bingtao and Zhao Xintong. Their opponents received walkovers to the next round. Only four players ranked inside the world's top 16—Luca Brecel, Jack Lisowski, Neil Robertson, and Kyren Wilson—featured at the main stage in Berlin.

Zhao Xintong won the 2022 event, defeating Yan 9–0 in the final, but was unable to defend the title due to his suspension. Jimmy White defeated Peng Yisong 5–1 in the last 32, becoming the first player over 60 to reach the last 16 of a ranking event since Eddie Charlton at the 1992 British Open. Ali Carter defeated Tom Ford 10–3 in the final to win the tournament for a second time, following his previous win in 2013. It was Carter's fifth ranking title and his first ranking win since the 2016 World Open. He moved up eight places to 15th in the world rankings after the event.

Robert Milkins made the third maximum break of his career, the highest of the tournament, in his quarter-final match against Chris Wakelin. Milkins also made a 146 break in his last-32 match against Daniel Wells.

== Prize fund ==
The event featured a total prize fund of £427,000 with the winner receiving £80,000.

- Winner: £80,000
- Runner-up: £35,000
- Semi-final: £17,500
- Quarter-final: £11,000
- Last 16: £7,500
- Last 32: £4,500
- Last 64: £3,000
- Highest break: £5,000
- Total: £427,000

== Main draw ==
Below are the event's results from the last-32 stage to the final. Player names in bold denote match winners. Numbers in brackets denote player seedings.

**Last 32**; Best of 9 frames
Zhao Xintong (CHN) (1)	w/d
**Tom Ford (ENG) (32)**	**w/o**
**Tian Pengfei (CHN)**	**5**
Anthony McGill (SCO) (17)	1
**Jimmy Robertson (ENG) (24)**	**w/o**
Zhao Jianbo (CHN)	w/d
Sam Craigie (ENG)	2
**Kyren Wilson (ENG) (8)**	**5**
Peng Yisong (CHN)	1
**Jimmy White (ENG)**	**5**
**Jack Lisowski (ENG) (12)**	**5**
Zhang Anda (CHN)	0
**Xiao Guodong (CHN)**	**5**
Fan Zhengyi (CHN)	4
**Elliot Slessor (ENG)**	**5**
Joe O'Connor (ENG)	2
**Neil Robertson (AUS) (3)**	**5**
Joe Perry (ENG) (30)	3
**Chris Wakelin (ENG)**	**5**
Si Jiahui (CHN)	4
Matthew Stevens (WAL)	2
**Luca Brecel (BEL) (11)**	**5**
**Robert Milkins (ENG) (27)**	**5**
Daniel Wells (WAL)	3
**Louis Heathcote (ENG)**	**5**
Cao Yupeng (CHN)	4
Li Hang (CHN)	w/d
**Ali Carter (ENG) (23)**	**w/o**
**Ricky Walden (ENG) (18)**	**w/o**
Yan Bingtao (CHN) (15)	w/d
**Pang Junxu (CHN)**	**5**
Ross Muir (SCO)	3

**Last 16**; Best of 9 frames
**(England) Tom Ford (32)**	**5**
(China) Tian Pengfei	3
(England) Jimmy Robertson (24)	2
**(England) Kyren Wilson (8)**	**5**
(England) Jimmy White	2
**(England) Jack Lisowski (12)**	**5**
**(China) Xiao Guodong**	**5**
(England) Elliot Slessor	1
(Australia) Neil Robertson (3)	4
**(England) Chris Wakelin**	**5**
(Belgium) Luca Brecel (11)	3
**(England) Robert Milkins (27)**	**5**
(England) Louis Heathcote	1
**(England) Ali Carter (23)**	**5**
(England) Ricky Walden (18)	1
**(China) Pang Junxu**	**5**

**Quarter-finals**; Best of 9 frames
**(England) Tom Ford (32)**	**5**
(England) Kyren Wilson (8)	2
**(England) Jack Lisowski (12)**	**5**
(China) Xiao Guodong	3
(England) Chris Wakelin	2
**(England) Robert Milkins (27)**	**5**
**(England) Ali Carter (23)**	**5**
(China) Pang Junxu	3

**Semi-finals**; Best of 11 frames
**(England) Tom Ford (32)**	**6**
(England) Jack Lisowski (12)	5
(England) Robert Milkins (27)	5
**(England) Ali Carter (23)**	**6**

**Final**; Best of 19 frames
(England) Tom Ford (32)	3
**(England) Ali Carter (23)**	**10**

=== Final ===
Final: Best of 19 frames. Referee: Terry Camilleri; Tempodrom, Berlin, Germany, 5 February 2023
Tom Ford (32); England	3–**10**	**Ali Carter** (23); England
Afternoon: **122**–0 (121), **66**–64, 6–**69**, 33–**72**, 0–**125**, 53–**74**, 1–**73**, 0–**129** (120), **65**–45; Evening: 21–**76**, 0–**116**, 53–**66**, 1–**65**
121	Highest break	120
1	Century breaks	1

== Qualifying ==
Qualifying for the event took place between 21 and 26 November 2022 at the Morningside Arena in Leicester, England. There were three rounds of qualifying, where the first round consisted of two pre-qualifier matches only. All qualifier matches were played as best-of-nine frames.

=== Round 1 (Pre-Qualifiers) ===
- PQ1: Alexander Ursenbacher (SUI) 5–0 Dean Young (SCO)
- PQ2: Rod Lawler (ENG) 5–0 Mink Nutcharut (THA)

=== Rounds 2 and 3 ===
Round 2 Best of 9 frames
Zhao Xintong (CHN) (1)	5
Wu Yize (CHN)	3
Muhammad Asif (PAK)	5
Ng On-yee (HKG)	2
Tom Ford (ENG) (32)	5
Zhang Jiankang (CHN)	4
Ken Doherty (IRL)	5
Andy Lee (HKG)	4
Ryan Day (WAL) (16)	3
Michael White (WAL)	5
Tian Pengfei (CHN)	5
Lei Peifan (CHN)	2
Anthony McGill (SCO) (17)	5
Jamie O'Neill (ENG)	1
Allan Taylor (ENG)	5
Yuan Sijun (CHN)	4
Jak Jones (WAL)	5
Lyu Haotian (CHN)	4
Jimmy Robertson (ENG) (24)	5
Hammad Miah (ENG)	3
Zhao Jianbo (CHN)	5
Ashley Hugill (ENG)	1
Mark Allen (NIR) (9)	5
Peter Lines (ENG)	2
Jamie Clarke (WAL)	5
Noppon Saengkham (THA)	1
Stephen Maguire (SCO) (25)	2
Sam Craigie (ENG)	5
David Lilley (ENG)	5
Anthony Hamilton (ENG)	2
Kyren Wilson (ENG) (8)	5
Jenson Kendrick (ENG)	0
Mark Selby (ENG) (5)	4
Peng Yisong (CHN)	5
Sean O'Sullivan (ENG)	2
Ian Burns (ENG)	5
Jamie Jones (WAL) (28)	3
Martin Gould (ENG)	5
Jimmy White (ENG)	5
Mark Joyce (ENG)	3
Jack Lisowski (ENG) (12)	5
Duane Jones (WAL)	2
Jackson Page (WAL)	5
Thepchaiya Un-Nooh (THA)	1
Zhou Yuelong (CHN) (21)	2
James Cahill (ENG)	5
Craig Steadman (ENG)	0
Zhang Anda (CHN)	5
Xiao Guodong (CHN)	5
Alfie Burden (ENG)	3
Hossein Vafaei (IRN) (20)	5
Aaron Hill (IRL)	4
Gerard Greene (NIR)	3
Fan Zhengyi (CHN)	5
Shaun Murphy (ENG) (13)	5
Andres Petrov (EST)	0
Elliot Slessor (ENG)	5
Chen Zifan (CHN)	4
Lu Ning (CHN) (29)	2
Sanderson Lam (ENG)	5
Zak Surety (ENG)	3
Joe O'Connor (ENG)	5
Judd Trump (ENG) (4)	4
Mark Davis (ENG)	5

Round 3 Best of 9 frames
(China) Zhao Xintong (1)	5
(Pakistan) Muhammad Asif	1
(England) Tom Ford (32)	5
(Republic of Ireland) Ken Doherty	1
(Wales) Michael White	2
(China) Tian Pengfei	5
(Scotland) Anthony McGill (17)	5
(England) Allan Taylor	0
(Wales) Jak Jones	2
(England) Jimmy Robertson (24)	5
(China) Zhao Jianbo	5
(Northern Ireland) Mark Allen (9)	0
(Wales) Jamie Clarke	2
(England) Sam Craigie	5
(England) David Lilley	0
(England) Kyren Wilson (8)	5
(China) Peng Yisong	5
(England) Ian Burns	4
(England) Martin Gould	2
(England) Jimmy White	5
(England) Jack Lisowski (12)	5
(Wales) Jackson Page	3
(England) James Cahill	2
(China) Zhang Anda	5
(China) Xiao Guodong	5
(Iran) Hossein Vafaei (20)	4
(China) Fan Zhengyi	5
(England) Shaun Murphy (13)	2
(England) Elliot Slessor	5
(England) Sanderson Lam	4
(England) Joe O'Connor	5
(England) Mark Davis	4

Round 2 Best of 9 frames
Neil Robertson (AUS) (3)	5
Bai Langning (CHN)	2
Asjad Iqbal (PAK)	0
Alexander Ursenbacher (SUI)	5
Joe Perry (ENG) (30)	5
Oliver Lines (ENG)	2
Dylan Emery (WAL)	1
Ryan Thomerson (AUS)	5
Stuart Bingham (ENG) (14)	2
Ben Woollaston (ENG)	5
John Astley (ENG)	2
Chris Wakelin (ENG)	5
David Gilbert (ENG) (19)	2
Andy Hicks (ENG)	5
Xu Si (CHN)	3
Si Jiahui (CHN)	5
Matthew Stevens (WAL)	5
Stephen Hendry (SCO)	0
Jordan Brown (NIR) (22)	1
Ding Junhui (CHN)	5
Barry Pinches (ENG)	5
Ben Mertens (BEL)	4
Luca Brecel (BEL) (11)	5
Chang Bingyu (CHN)	2
Himanshu Jain (IND)	1
Lukas Kleckers (GER)	5
Robert Milkins (ENG) (27)	5
Graeme Dott (SCO)	3
Michael Judge (IRL)	4
Daniel Wells (WAL)	5
John Higgins (SCO) (6)	5
Marco Fu (HKG)	3
Mark Williams (WAL) (7)	4
Julien Leclercq (BEL)	5
Mitchell Mann (ENG)	3
Louis Heathcote (ENG)	5
Matthew Selt (ENG) (26)	3
Scott Donaldson (SCO)	5
Cao Yupeng (CHN)	5
Anton Kazakov (UKR)	0
Barry Hawkins (ENG) (10)	5
Dominic Dale (WAL)	1
Li Hang (CHN)	5
Rebecca Kenna (ENG)	0
Ali Carter (ENG) (23)	5
Stuart Carrington (ENG)	2
Victor Sarkis (BRA)	0
Robbie Williams (ENG)	5
Reanne Evans (ENG)	4
Adam Duffy (ENG)	5
Ricky Walden (ENG) (18)	5
Fergal O'Brien (IRL)	2
David Grace (ENG)	5
Mark King (ENG)	2
Yan Bingtao (CHN) (15)	5
Rod Lawler (ENG)	2
Andrew Pagett (WAL)	1
Pang Junxu (CHN)	5
Gary Wilson (ENG) (31)	5
Dechawat Poomjaeng (THA)	0
Liam Highfield (ENG)	5
Mohamed Ibrahim (EGY)	4
Ross Muir (SCO)	5
Oliver Brown (ENG)	1

Round 3 Best of 9 frames
(Australia) Neil Robertson (3)	5
(Switzerland) Alexander Ursenbacher	2
(England) Joe Perry (30)	5
(Australia) Ryan Thomerson	1
(England) Ben Woollaston	3
(England) Chris Wakelin	5
(England) Andy Hicks	0
(China) Si Jiahui	5
(Wales) Matthew Stevens	5
(China) Ding Junhui	4
(England) Barry Pinches	2
(Belgium) Luca Brecel (11)	5
(Germany) Lukas Kleckers	2
(England) Robert Milkins (27)	5
(Wales) Daniel Wells	5
(Scotland) John Higgins (6)	3
(Belgium) Julien Leclercq	1
(England) Louis Heathcote	5
(Scotland) Scott Donaldson	3
(China) Cao Yupeng	5
(England) Barry Hawkins (10)	2
(China) Li Hang	5
(England) Ali Carter (23)	5
(England) Robbie Williams	2
(England) Adam Duffy	4
(England) Ricky Walden (18)	5
(England) David Grace	2
(China) Yan Bingtao (15)	5
(China) Pang Junxu	5
(England) Gary Wilson (31)	4
(England) Liam Highfield	3
(Scotland) Ross Muir	5

== Century breaks ==
=== Main stage centuries ===
Total: 27

- 147, 146, 109 – Robert Milkins
- 133, 130, 122, 121, 120, 111 – Ali Carter
- 133, 118 – Neil Robertson
- 128 – Matthew Stevens
- 125 – Daniel Wells
- 121, 104 – Tom Ford
- 120, 115 – Elliot Slessor
- 117, 102 – Jack Lisowski
- 117 – Si Jiahui
- 116, 102 – Chris Wakelin
- 114 – Louis Heathcote
- 114 – Tian Pengfei
- 112 – Kyren Wilson
- 107 – Pang Junxu
- 100 – Xiao Guodong

=== Qualifying stage centuries ===
Total: 60

- 144 – Fergal O'Brien
- 143, 119 – Ding Junhui
- 139, 101 – Ali Carter
- 139 – Fan Zhengyi
- 137, 123 – Lyu Haotian
- 133, 108 – Anthony McGill
- 133 – Zhang Anda
- 133 – Liam Highfield
- 132 – Michael White
- 131 – Xu Si
- 129, 102 – Yan Bingtao
- 129, 101 – David Grace
- 129 – Sam Craigie
- 127 – Judd Trump
- 124, 102 – Alexander Ursenbacher
- 121, 110 – Gary Wilson
- 119, 110, 109 – Kyren Wilson
- 119 – Jack Lisowski
- 117, 100 – Graeme Dott
- 117 – Jamie Jones
- 116 – Ricky Walden
- 115 – Mark Allen
- 115 – Xiao Guodong
- 110 – John Higgins
- 110 – Jackson Page
- 108, 105 – Elliot Slessor
- 108, 102 – Zhao Xintong
- 107, 105 – Joe O'Connor
- 106, 100 – Tian Pengfei
- 104 – Neil Robertson
- 103, 101 – Louis Heathcote
- 103 – Barry Pinches
- 102, 100 – Jimmy Robertson
- 102 – Jamie Clarke
- 102 – David Gilbert
- 102 – David Lilley
- 102 – Joe Perry
- 101 – Ryan Day
- 101 – Scott Donaldson
- 101 – Rod Lawler
- 101 – Matthew Selt
- 100 – James Cahill
- 100 – Duane Jones
