= 2023 Welsh Open (snooker) =

Snooker tournament

2023 BetVictor Welsh Open
Tournament information
- Dates: 13–19 February 2023
- Venue: Venue Cymru
- City: Llandudno
- Country: Wales
- Organisation: World Snooker Tour
- Format: Ranking event
- Total prize fund: £427,000
- Winner's share: £80,000
- Highest break: Shaun Murphy (ENG) (147)

Final
- Champion: Robert Milkins (ENG)
- Runner-up: Shaun Murphy (ENG)
- Score: 9–7

The 2023 Welsh Open (officially the 2023 BetVictor Welsh Open) was a professional snooker tournament that took place from 13 to 19 February 2023 at Venue Cymru in Llandudno, Wales, marking the first time since the event's inception in 1992 that it was staged elsewhere than Newport or Cardiff. Qualifiers took place from 11 to 13 January 2023 at the Metrodome in Barnsley, although matches involving the top 16 players in the world rankings, as well as matches involving two Welsh wild-card entrants, were held over and played at the final venue. Organised by the World Snooker Tour and sponsored by online betting company BetVictor, the tournament was broadcast by BBC Cymru Wales and the BBC Red Button domestically, by Eurosport in Europe, and by multiple other broadcasters internationally. The winner received £80,000 from a total prize fund of £427,000.

The 11th ranking event of the 2022–23 season, the Welsh Open was the fourth and final tournament in the season's Home Nations Series, following the Northern Ireland Open, the Scottish Open, and the English Open. It was also the final tournament in the season's BetVictor Series, which carried a £150,000 bonus for the player who won the most cumulative prize money across its eight events. Matches were played as the best of seven frames until the quarter-finals, which were the best of nine frames. The semi-finals were the best of 11 frames and the final was the best of 17 frames.

Joe Perry was the defending champion, having defeated Judd Trump 9–5 in the 2022 final, but he lost 1–4 to Robbie Williams in the last 32. Robert Milkins defeated Shaun Murphy 9–7 in the final to win his second ranking title, and also secured the BetVictor Series bonus, having won cumulative prize money of £127,000 across the eight tournaments. He advanced from 27th to 16th place in the world rankings after the event.

The event's main stage produced a total of 48 century breaks. Murphy made back-to-back breaks of 145 and 147, the highest of the tournament, in the second and third frames of his last-16 match against Daniel Wells. The 147 was Murphy's seventh maximum break in professional competition.

== Prize fund ==
The breakdown of prize money for this event is shown below:

- Winner: £80,000
- Runner-up: £35,000
- Semi-final: £17,500
- Quarter-final: £11,000
- Last 16: £7,500
- Last 32: £4,500
- Last 64: £3,000
- Highest break: £5,000
- Total: £427,000

== Main draw ==
=== Top half ===
Last 64; Best of 7 frames
Joe Perry (ENG) (1)	4
Mark Joyce (ENG)	1
Liam Davies (WAL)	0
Robbie Williams (ENG)	4
Stuart Carrington (ENG)	4
Andy Lee (HKG)	2
Graeme Dott (SCO)	2
Joe O'Connor (ENG)	4
Hammad Miah (ENG)	2
Aaron Hill (IRL)	4
Pang Junxu (CHN)	4
Kyren Wilson (ENG) (9)	2
Julien Leclercq (BEL)	4
Jordan Brown (NIR) (24)	2
Jak Jones (WAL)	4
Mark Williams (WAL) (8)	3
Judd Trump (ENG) (5)	4
Louis Heathcote (ENG)	2
Matthew Selt (ENG) (27)	1
Daniel Wells (WAL)	4
Shaun Murphy (ENG) (11)	4
Peng Yisong (CHN)	1
Anthony McGill (SCO) (20)	4
Sam Craigie (ENG)	2
David Lilley (ENG)	4
Ricky Walden (ENG) (19)	1
Ryan Thomerson (AUS)	0
Jack Lisowski (ENG) (12)	4
Yuan Sijun (CHN)	4
Stephen Maguire (SCO) (28)	1
Dominic Dale (WAL)	4
Neil Robertson (AUS) (4)	0

Last 32; Best of 7 frames
(England) Joe Perry (1)	1
(England) Robbie Williams	4
(England) Stuart Carrington	0
(England) Joe O'Connor	4
(Republic of Ireland) Aaron Hill	1
(China) Pang Junxu	4
(Belgium) Julien Leclercq	2
(Wales) Jak Jones	4
(England) Judd Trump (5)	2
(Wales) Daniel Wells	4
(England) Shaun Murphy (11)	4
(Scotland) Anthony McGill (20)	2
(England) David Lilley	2
(England) Jack Lisowski (12)	4
(China) Yuan Sijun	4
(Wales) Dominic Dale	1

Last 16; Best of 7 frames
(England) Robbie Williams	0
(England) Joe O'Connor	4
(China) Pang Junxu	4
(Wales) Jak Jones	2
(Wales) Daniel Wells	1
(England) Shaun Murphy (11)	4
(England) Jack Lisowski (12)	1
(China) Yuan Sijun	4

Quarter-finals; Best of 9 frames
(England) Joe O'Connor	4
(China) Pang Junxu	5
(England) Shaun Murphy (11)	5
(China) Yuan Sijun	0

Semi-finals; Best of 11 frames
(China) Pang Junxu	3
(England) Shaun Murphy (11)	6

=== Bottom half ===
Last 64; Best of 7 frames
Mark Selby (ENG) (3)	4
Si Jiahui (CHN)	3
Robert Milkins (ENG) (30)	4
Dean Young (SCO)	2
Barry Hawkins (ENG) (13)	4
Ben Woollaston (ENG)	0
Hossein Vafaei (IRN) (18)	4
Ken Doherty (IRL)	1
Cao Yupeng (CHN)	4
Ding Junhui (CHN) (21)	0
Elliot Slessor (ENG)	0
Luca Brecel (BEL) (10)	4
Andy Hicks (ENG)	4
Wu Yize (CHN)	3
Mitchell Mann (ENG)	1
Mark Allen (NIR) (6)	4
John Higgins (SCO) (7)	4
Martin Gould (ENG)	0
Mohamed Ibrahim (EGY)	2
Sanderson Lam (ENG)	4
Tian Pengfei (CHN)	4
Jimmy White (ENG)	2
Ali Carter (ENG) (22)	4
Ian Martin (ENG)	1
Chris Wakelin (ENG)	2
David Gilbert (ENG) (17)	4
Ben Mertens (BEL)	4
Jackson Page (WAL)	2
Matthew Stevens (WAL)	3
Rod Lawler (ENG)	4
Ross Muir (SCO)	3
Ronnie O'Sullivan (ENG) (2)	4

Last 32; Best of 7 frames
(England) Mark Selby (3)	2
(England) Robert Milkins (30)	4
(England) Barry Hawkins (13)	3
(Iran) Hossein Vafaei (18)	4
(China) Cao Yupeng	1
(Belgium) Luca Brecel (10)	4
(England) Andy Hicks	1
(Northern Ireland) Mark Allen (6)	4
(Scotland) John Higgins (7)	4
(England) Sanderson Lam	3
(China) Tian Pengfei	4
(England) Ali Carter (22)	2
(England) David Gilbert (17)	3
(Belgium) Ben Mertens	4
(England) Rod Lawler	0
(England) Ronnie O'Sullivan (2)	4

Last 16; Best of 7 frames
(England) Robert Milkins (30)	4
(Iran) Hossein Vafaei (18)	1
(Belgium) Luca Brecel (10)	2
(Northern Ireland) Mark Allen (6)	4
(Scotland) John Higgins (7)	1
(China) Tian Pengfei	4
(Belgium) Ben Mertens	0
(England) Ronnie O'Sullivan (2)	4

Quarter-finals; Best of 9 frames
(England) Robert Milkins (30)	5
(Northern Ireland) Mark Allen (6)	1
(China) Tian Pengfei	5
(England) Ronnie O'Sullivan (2)	0

Semi-finals; Best of 11 frames
(England) Robert Milkins (30)	6
(China) Tian Pengfei	2

=== Final ===
Final: Best of 17 frames. Referee: John Pellew; Venue Cymru, Llandudno, Wales, 19 February 2023
Shaun Murphy (11); England	7–9	Robert Milkins (30); England
Afternoon: 61–58, 62–25, 47–67, 70–28, 7–116, 58–68, 27–66, 111–6; Evening: 19–71, 99–0, 62–69, 5–72, 65–16, 0–75, 114–0 (114), 11–72
114	Highest break	66
1	Century breaks	0

== Qualifying ==
Qualification for the tournament took place from 11 to 13 January 2023 at the Metrodome in Barnsley, England.

=== Main qualifying ===
- Himanshu Jain (IND) 0–4 Mark Joyce (ENG)
- Jenson Kendrick (ENG) 2–4 Andy Lee (HKG)
- Gary Wilson (ENG) 3–4 Graeme Dott (SCO)
- Muhammad Asif (PAK) 1–4 Joe O'Connor (ENG)
- Zak Surety (ENG) 3–4 Hammad Miah (ENG)
- Tom Ford (ENG) 1–4 Aaron Hill (IRL)
- Pang Junxu (CHN) 4–3 Xu Si (CHN)
- Julien Leclercq (BEL) 4–0 Duane Jones (WAL)
- Jordan Brown (NIR) 4–1 Steven Hallworth (ENG)
- Rebecca Kenna (ENG) 0–4 Jak Jones (WAL)
- James Cahill (ENG) 1–4 Louis Heathcote (ENG)
- Matthew Selt (ENG) 4–2 Adam Duffy (ENG)
- Daniel Wells (WAL) 4–2 Dechawat Poomjaeng (THA)
- Peng Yisong (CHN) 4–1 Reanne Evans (ENG)
- Anthony McGill (SCO) 4–3 Lukas Kleckers (GER)
- Mink Nutcharut (THA) 1–4 Sam Craigie (ENG)
- David Lilley (ENG) 4–3 Jamie Clarke (WAL)
- Ricky Walden (ENG) 4–2 Liam Highfield (ENG)
- Ryan Thomerson (AUS) 4–2 Andrew Pagett (WAL)
- Peter Lines (ENG) 1–4 Yuan Sijun (CHN)
- Stephen Maguire (SCO) 4–1 Michael Judge (IRL)
- Farakh Ajaib (PAK) 1–4 Dominic Dale (WAL)
- Si Jiahui (CHN) 4–0 Xiao Guodong (CHN)
- Robert Milkins (ENG) 4–2 Oliver Brown (ENG)
- Dean Young (SCO) 4–3 Gerard Greene (NIR)
- Allan Taylor (ENG) 0–4 Ben Woollaston (ENG)
- Ken Doherty (IRL) 4–3 Thepchaiya Un-Nooh (THA)
- Cao Yupeng (CHN) 4–1 Scott Donaldson (SCO)
- Ding Junhui (CHN) 4–0 Ashley Hugill (ENG)
- Elliot Slessor (ENG) 4–0 Dylan Emery (WAL)
- Andy Hicks (ENG) 4–2 Ng On-yee (HKG)
- Zhou Yuelong (CHN) 0–4 Wu Yize (CHN)
- Lei Peifan (CHN) 1–4 Mitchell Mann (ENG)
- Fergal O'Brien (IRL) 2–4 Martin Gould (ENG)
- Jimmy Robertson (ENG) 3–4 Mohamed Ibrahim (EGY)
- Sanderson Lam (ENG) 4–2 Anthony Hamilton (ENG)
- Jimmy White (ENG) 4–0 Craig Steadman (ENG)
- Ali Carter (ENG) 4–2 John Astley (ENG)
- Andres Petrov (EST) 3–4 Ian Martin (ENG)
- Mark Davis (ENG) 1–4 Chris Wakelin (ENG)
- Barry Pinches (ENG) 0–4 Ben Mertens (BEL)
- Matthew Stevens (WAL) 4–1 Fan Zhengyi (CHN)
- Jamie Jones (WAL) 2–4 Rod Lawler (ENG)
- Anton Kazakov (UKR) 1–4 Ross Muir (SCO)

=== Held-over matches ===
Matches involving the top 16 seeds and the nominated wild-card players were played at the Venue Cymru. Due to David Gilbert and Hossein Vafaei being late replacements for the 2023 Masters, their matches were also held-over, due to clashing with the scheduled qualifying slot.

- Joe Perry (ENG) (1) 4–0 Mark King (ENG)
- Noppon Saengkham (THA) 3–4 Liam Davies (WAL)
- Oliver Briffett-Payne (WAL) 1–4 Robbie Williams (ENG)
- Ryan Day (WAL) 3–4 Stuart Carrington (ENG)
- Kyren Wilson (ENG) (9) 4–1 Asjad Iqbal (PAK)
- Mark Williams (WAL) (8) 4–2 Michael White (WAL)
- Judd Trump (ENG) (5) 4–0 David Grace (ENG)
- Shaun Murphy (ENG) 4–0 Victor Sarkis (BRA)
- Jack Lisowski (ENG) 4–0 Zhang Anda (CHN)
- Neil Robertson (AUS) (4) 4–1 Andrew Higginson (ENG)
- Mark Selby (ENG) (3) 4–2 Jamie O'Neill (ENG)
- Barry Hawkins (ENG) 4–1 Ian Burns (ENG)
- Hossein Vafaei (IRN) 4–2 Lyu Haotian (CHN)
- Luca Brecel (BEL) 4–1 Sean O'Sullivan (ENG)
- Mark Allen (NIR) (6) 4–1 Alfie Burden (ENG)
- John Higgins (SCO) (7) 4–0 Alexander Ursenbacher (CHE)
- Michael Holt (ENG) 1–4 Tian Pengfei (CHN)
- Stuart Bingham (ENG) 1–4 Jackson Page (WAL)
- David Gilbert (ENG) 4–2 Marco Fu (HKG)
- Ronnie O'Sullivan (ENG) (2) 4–0 Oliver Lines (ENG)

== Century breaks ==
=== Main stage centuries ===
A total of 48 century breaks were made during the main event.

- 147, 145, 134, 114, 102, 100 – Shaun Murphy
- 142, 113, 110 – David Gilbert
- 138 – Jack Lisowski
- 137, 115, 109 – Robert Milkins
- 135, 112, 101 – John Higgins
- 134, 114 – David Lilley
- 133, 102, 100 – Hossein Vafaei
- 133 – Marco Fu
- 131, 105 – Jackson Page
- 130 – Ben Mertens
- 129 – Neil Robertson
- 125, 116 – Robbie Williams
- 124, 124 – Mark Selby
- 124 – Ali Carter
- 124 – Pang Junxu
- 122 – Mark Williams
- 122 – Liam Davies
- 114 – Sanderson Lam
- 108, 100 – Ronnie O'Sullivan
- 108 – Joe O'Connor
- 107 – Joe Perry
- 105, 101 – Mark Allen
- 105 – Si Jiahui
- 104 – Asjad Iqbal
- 102 – Andy Lee
- 102 – Wu Yize
- 101 – Daniel Wells
- 100 – Luca Brecel
- 100 – Yuan Sijun

=== Qualifying stage centuries ===
A total of 14 century breaks were made during the qualifying stage for the event.

- 142 – Elliot Slessor
- 139 – Stephen Maguire
- 138, 108 – Ricky Walden
- 136 – Ben Woollaston
- 127 – Sam Craigie
- 117 – Martin Gould
- 112 – Scott Donaldson
- 105 – Jak Jones
- 104 – Andrew Pagett
- 102 – Mitchell Mann
- 102 – Daniel Wells
- 100 – Steven Hallworth
- 100 – Fergal O'Brien
