= 2016 IBSF World Snooker Championship – Men's =

IBSF World Snooker Championship
Tournament information
- Dates: 19–29 November 2016
- Venue: Al-Sadd Sports Club
- City: Doha
- Country: Qatar
- Organisation: IBSF
- Total prize fund: $16,000
- Highest break: (Thailand) Issara Kachaiwong (147)

Final
- Champion: (Iran) Soheil Vahedi
- Runner-up: (Wales) Andrew Pagett
- Score: 8–1

The 2016 IBSF World Snooker Championship was an amateur snooker tournament that took place from 19 November to 29 November 2016 in Doha, Qatar. It was the 42nd edition of the IBSF World Snooker Championship and also doubled as a qualification event for the World Snooker Tour.

119 players representing 52 nations and sovereign states competed in the tournament including 2015 champion, Pankaj Advani who declined his invitation to join the professional World Snooker Tour and as such was able to compete in this year's tournament. Advani however he was defeated in the semi-finals by Welshmen Andrew Pagett. In doing so Pagett became the first player from outside the Asian confederation to reach the final since 2012. The tournament was eventually won by Iran's Soheil Vahedi, who defeated Pagett of Wales 8–1 in the final. Vahedi became only the second Iranian player after Hossein Vafaei to win the championship and as a result, Vahedi was offered that chance to turn professional with a two-year card to play World Snooker Tour for the 2017/2018 and 2018/2019 seasons.

== Results ==
=== Group Round ===
==== Group A ====
Place	Seed	Team	Matches	Matches won	Frames won	Frames lost	Difference
1	3	(India) Pankaj Advani	4	4	16	0	16
2	45	(Poland) Marcin Nitschke	4	3	12	9	3
3	72	(Iran) Hamed Zarehdoost	4	2	11	13	–2
4		(Brazil) Victor Sarkis	4	1	7	14	–7
5		(Latvia) Maris Volajs	4	0	6	16	–10

==== Group B ====
Place	Seed	Team	Matches	Matches won	Frames won	Frames lost	Difference
1	4	(Germany) Lukas Kleckers	2	2	8	1	7
2	50	(New Zealand) Jason Todd	2	1	4	5	–1
3	75	(Sweden) Simon Lindblom	2	0	2	8	–6

==== Group C ====
Place	Seed	Team	Matches	Matches won	Frames won	Frames lost	Difference
1	6	(Afghanistan) Mohammad Rais Senzahi	4	4	16	3	13
2	32	(Malta) Brian Cini	4	3	15	6	9
3	60	(Cyprus) Antonis Poullos	4	2	9	8	1
4		(Kuwait) Mekdad Taqi	4	1	5	15	–10
5		(Morocco) Akdi Soulaimane	4	0	3	13	–16

==== Group D ====
Place	Seed	Team	Matches	Matches won	Frames won	Frames lost	Difference
1	23	(India) Lucky Vatnani	4	3	15	8	7
2	41	(Iran) Amir Sarkhosh	4	3	13	7	6
3	61	(Mongolia) Enkhjargal Enkhbaatar	4	2	12	13	1
4		(Austria) Andreas Ploner	4	2	11	11	0
5		(Cyprus) Marios Kleitou	4	0	2	16	–14

==== Group E ====
Place	Seed	Team	Matches	Matches won	Frames won	Frames lost	Difference
1	1	(Wales) Jamie Clarke	3	3	12	0	12
2	51	(Singapore) Shu Seng Chua	3	2	8	10	–2
3	77	(Austria) Oskar Charlesworth	3	1	7	10	–3
4		(South Africa) Richard Halliday	3	0	5	12	–7

==== Group F ====
Place	Seed	Team	Matches	Matches won	Frames won	Frames lost	Difference
1	10	(Belgium) Jeff Jacobs	3	3	12	3	9
2	49	(Australia) Peter McCullagh	3	2	9	8	1
3	68	(Hong Kong) Lee Chun Wai	3	1	8	8	0
4		(Sri Lanka) Mohamed Mubeen	3	0	3	16	–13

==== Group G ====
Place	Seed	Team	Matches	Matches won	Frames won	Frames lost	Difference
1	19	(England) Brandon Sargeant	4	4	16	6	10
2	28	(Australia) Ryan Thomerson	4	3	15	5	10
3	73	(Qatar) Mhanaa Alobaidli	4	2	9	12	–3
4		(Austria) Paul Schopf	4	1	8	13	–5
5		(Kuwait) Soud Alabdul Razaq	4	0	4	16	–16

==== Group H ====
Place	Seed	Team	Matches	Matches won	Frames won	Frames lost	Difference
1	7	(Hong Kong) Ka Wai Cheung	4	4	16	3	13
2	29	(Wales) Rhydian Richards	4	3	14	4	10
3	78	(Finland) Jyri Virtanen	4	2	8	12	–4
4		(Kuwait) Abdullah Alkandari	4	1	5	15	–10
5		(Egypt) Mahmoud Elshourbagy	4	0	7	16	–9

==== Group I ====
Place	Seed	Team	Matches	Matches won	Frames won	Frames lost	Difference
1	17	(Northern Ireland) Declan Brennan	3	3	12	4	8
2	34	(Switzerland) Alexander Ursenbacher	3	2	10	5	5
3	70	(United States) Ahmed Aly Elsayed	3	1	4	8	–4
4		(Bahrain) Khalil Busaif	3	0	3	12	–9

==== Group J ====
Place	Seed	Team	Matches	Matches won	Frames won	Frames lost	Difference
1	26	(Wales) Andrew Pagett	3	2	11	8	3
2	52	(Poland) Mateusz Baranowski	3	2	8	9	–1
3	64	(Singapore) Ang Boon Chin	3	1	9	10	–1
4		(India) Sundeep Gulati	3	1	7	8	–1

==== Group K ====
Place	Seed	Team	Matches	Matches won	Frames won	Frames lost	Difference
1	16	(Thailand) Issara Kachaiwong	3	3	12	4	8
2	47	(United States) Ajeya Prabhakar	3	2	9	10	–1
3	62	(Isle of Man) Sean Corkish	3	1	9	10	–1
4		(Jordan) Mohammad Alqraini	3	0	6	12	–6

==== Group L ====
Place	Seed	Team	Matches	Matches won	Frames won	Frames lost	Difference
1	15	(Pakistan) Mohammad Bilal	4	4	16	5	11
2	44	(Germany) Felix Frede	4	3	13	9	4
3	65	(Qatar) Mohsen Bukshaisha	4	2	10	12	–2
4		(Sweden) Belan Sharif	4	1	11	13	–2
5		(New Zealand) Sam Bond	4	0	5	16	–11

==== Group M ====
Place	Seed	Team	Matches	Matches won	Frames won	Frames lost	Difference
1	13	(Iran) Soheil Vahedi	4	4	16	4	12
2	30	(Pakistan) Babar Masih	4	3	15	7	8
3	71	(Japan) Tetsuya Kuwata	4	2	9	9	0
4		(Iceland) Thorri Jensson	4	1	7	13	–6
5		(Albania) Arenc Norja	4	0	2	16	–14

==== Group N ====
Place	Seed	Team	Matches	Matches won	Frames won	Frames lost	Difference
1	24	(England) Oliver Brown	4	3	14	7	7
2	43	(Qatar) Bashar Abdulmajeed	4	3	13	12	1
3	66	(Belgium) Tomasz Skalski	4	2	13	12	1
4		(Japan) Keishin Kamihashi	4	2	12	12	0
5		(Brazil) Thadeu Nobres	4	0	7	16	–9

==== Group O ====
Place	Seed	Team	Matches	Matches won	Frames won	Frames lost	Difference
1	2	(United Arab Emirates) Mohamed Shehab	3	3	12	0	12
2	48	(Poland) Krzysztof Wróbel	3	2	8	6	2
3	76	(Qatar) Khamis Alobaidli	3	1	5	10	–5
4		(Mozambique) Ibrahim Ahamed	3	0	3	12	–9

==== Group P ====
Place	Seed	Team	Matches	Matches won	Frames won	Frames lost	Difference
1	18	(Republic of Ireland) TJ Dowling	4	4	16	6	10
2	37	(Pakistan) Muhammad Asif	4	3	14	7	7
3	56	(Qatar) Ali Alobaidli	4	2	13	8	5
4		(Bahrain) Hesham Alsaqer	4	1	6	12	–6
5		(Egypt) Hisham Nadi	4	0	0	16	–16

==== Group Q ====
Place	Seed	Team	Matches	Matches won	Frames won	Frames lost	Difference
1	12	(China) Yuan Sijun	4	4	16	4	12
2	42	(Malaysia) Mohd Reza Hassan	4	3	14	9	5
3	54	(Republic of Ireland) Jason Devaney	4	2	11	10	1
4		(Iran) Omar Ali	4	1	9	14	–5
5		(New Zealand) Matthew Scarborough	4	0	3	16	–13

==== Group R ====
Place	Seed	Team	Matches	Matches won	Frames won	Frames lost	Difference
1	20	(Scotland) Chris Totten	3	3	12	6	6
2	39	(Qatar) Ahmed Saif	3	2	10	6	4
3	67	(France) Alexis Callewaert	3	1	6	9	–3
4		(United Arab Emirates) Saif Al Shamsi	3	0	5	12	–7

==== Group S ====
Place	Seed	Team	Matches	Matches won	Frames won	Frames lost	Difference
1	14	(Malaysia) Keen Hoo Moh	4	4	16	4	12
2	36	(Russia) Ivan Kakovsky	4	3	13	6	7
3	57	(South Korea) Daegyu Lee	4	2	11	11	0
4		(United States) Laszlo Kovacs	4	1	4	12	–8
5		(England) Wayne Townsend	4	0	5	16	–11

==== Group T ====
Place	Seed	Team	Matches	Matches won	Frames won	Frames lost	Difference
1	9	(Scotland) Michael Collumb	4	4	16	3	13
2	31	(Kyrgyzstan) Mukhamed Karimberdi Uulu	4	3	13	5	8
3	59	(Palestine) Khaled Alastal	4	2	10	11	–1
4		(Mongolia) Ulziitogtokh Davaasuren	4	1	8	12	–4
5		(Cyprus) Epaminondas Pouris	4	0	0	16	–16

==== Group U ====
Place	Seed	Team	Matches	Matches won	Frames won	Frames lost	Difference
1	11	(Thailand) Thanawat Tirapongpaiboon	4	4	16	4	12
2	33	(Bahrain) Habib Subah	4	3	15	7	8
3	69	(Iraq) Ali Hussein	4	2	10	11	–1
4		(Russia) Mikhail Terekhov	4	1	7	15	–8
5		(South Africa) Muhammad Faaris Kahn	4	3	16	12	–11

==== Group V ====
Place	Seed	Team	Matches	Matches won	Frames won	Frames lost	Difference
1	8	(Australia) Matthew Bolton	4	4	16	3	13
2	35	(Wales) Alex Taubman	4	3	14	8	6
3	74	(Sri Lanka) Mohamed Fazil	4	2	9	12	–3
4		(Philippines) Alvin Barbero	4	1	8	13	–5
5		(Northern Ireland) Conor McCormack	4	0	5	16	–11

==== Group W ====
Place	Seed	Team	Matches	Matches won	Frames won	Frames lost	Difference
1	5	(Republic of Ireland) Michael Judge	3	3	12	2	10
2	46	(Australia) James Mifsud	3	2	8	8	0
3	63	(United Arab Emirates) Mohammed Alshamsi	3	1	9	8	1
4		(Qatar) Abdullah Alsuwaidi	3	0	1	12	–11

==== Group X ====
Place	Seed	Team	Matches	Matches won	Frames won	Frames lost	Difference
1	21	(India) Manan Chandra	4	3	15	7	8
2	27	(Iran) Arman Dinarvand	4	3	14	6	8
3	58	(Singapore) Chee Keong Chan	4	3	12	13	–1
4		(Iceland) Sigurdur Kristjansson	4	1	10	12	–2
5		(Albania) Dorjan Maknori	4	0	3	16	–13

==== Group Y ====
Place	Seed	Team	Matches	Matches won	Frames won	Frames lost	Difference
1	22	(China) Chen Zifan	4	3	15	7	8
2	40	(Turkey) Ismail Türker	4	3	13	7	6
3	53	(Egypt) Basem Eltahhan	4	3	14	8	6
4		(Lithuania) Konstantin Afanasjev	4	1	8	15	–7
5		(Jordan) Audi Alnouti	4	0	3	16	–13

==== Group Z ====
Place	Seed	Team	Matches	Matches won	Frames won	Frames lost	Difference
1	25	(Egypt) Mohamed Ibrahim	3	2	10	6	4
2	38	(Belgium) Kevin Van Hove	3	2	10	6	4
3	55	(Hong Kong) Ming Wa Man	3	2	10	6	4
4		(Kazakhstan) Mikhail Li	3	0	0	12	–12

=== Knockout rounds ===
==== Round 1 ====
Best of 7 frames

65	(Qatar) Mohsen Bukshaisha	1–4	64	(Singapore) Ang Boon Chin
73	(Qatar) Mhanaa Alobaidli	4–1	56	(Qatar) Ali Alobaidli
57	(South Korea) Daegyu Lee	3–4	72	(Iran) Hamed Zarehdoost
69	(Iraq) Ali Hussein	3–4	60	(Cyprus) Antonis Poullos
53	(Egypt) Basem Eltahhan	4–1	76	(Qatar) Khamis Alobaidli
77	(Austria) Oskar Charlesworth	1–4	52	(Poland) Mateusz Baranowski
61	(Mongolia) Enkhjargal Enkhbaatar	4–2	68	(Hong Kong) Lee Chun Wai

67	(France) Alexis Callewaert	1–4	62	(Isle of Man) Sean Corkish
51	(Singapore) Shu Seng Chua	2–4	76	(Finland) Jyri Virtanen
75	(Sweden) Simon Lindblom	2–4	54	(Republic of Ireland) Jason Devaney
59	(Palestine) Khaled Alastal	4–2	70	(United States) Ahmed Aly Elsayed
71	(Japan) Tetsuya Kuwata	4–1	58	(Singapore) Chee Keong Chan
55	(Hong Kong) Ming Wa Man	4–0	74	(Sri Lanka) Mohamed Fazil
63	(United Arab Emirates) Mohammed Alshamsi	2–4	66	(Belgium) Tomasz Skalski

==== Round 2 ====
Best of 7 frames

1	(Wales) Jamie Clarke	4–1	64	(Singapore) Ang Boon Chin
33	(Bahrain) Habib Subah	3–4	32	(Malta) Brian Cini
17	(Northern Ireland) Declan Brennan	4–3	48	(Poland) Krzysztof Wróbel
49	(Australia) Peter McCullagh	0–4	16	(Thailand) Issara Kachaiwong
9	(Scotland) Michael Collumb	4–0	73	(Qatar) Mhanaa Alobaidli
41	(Iran) Amir Sarkhosh	4–3	24	(England) Oliver Brown
25	(Egypt) Mohamed Ibrahim	4–3	40	(Turkey) Ismail Türker
72	(Iran) Hamed Zarehdoost	4–3	8	(Australia) Matthew Bolton
5	(Republic of Ireland) Michael Judge	4–1	60	(Cyprus) Antonis Poullos
37	(Pakistan) Muhammad Asif	4–2	28	(Australia) Ryan Thomerson
21	(India) Manan Chandra	4–2	44	(Germany) Felix Frede
53	(Egypt) Basem Eltahhan	1–4	12	(China) Yuan Sijun
13	(Iran) Soheil Vahedi	4–3	52	(Poland) Mateusz Baranowski
45	(Poland) Marcin Nitschke	3–4	20	(Scotland) Chris Totten
29	(Wales) Rhydian Richards	4–3	36	(Russia) Ivan Kakovsky
61	(Mongolia) Enkhjargal Enkhbaatar	0–4	4	(Germany) Lukas Kleckers

3	(India) Pankaj Advani	4–0	62	(Isle of Man) Sean Corkish
35	(Wales) Alex Taubman	2–4	30	(Pakistan) Babar Masih
19	(England) Brandon Sargeant	4–0	46	(Australia) James Mifsud
78	(Finland) Jyri Virtanen	1–4	14	(Malaysia) Keen Hoo Moh
11	(Thailand) Thanawat Tirapongpaiboon	4–0	54	(Republic of Ireland) Jason Devaney
43	(Qatar) Bashar Abdulmajeed	1–4	22	(China) Chen Zifan
27	(Iran) Arman Dinarvand	4–3	38	(Belgium) Kevin Van Hove
59	(Palestine) Khaled Alastal	1–4	6	(Afghanistan) Mohammad Rais Senzahi
7	(Hong Kong) Ka Wai Cheung	4–3	71	(Japan) Tetsuya Kuwata
39	(Qatar) Ahmed Saif	3–4	26	(Wales) Andrew Pagett
23	(India) Lucky Vatnani	4–3	42	(Malaysia) Mohd Reza Hassan
55	(Hong Kong) Ming Wa Man	2–4	10	(Belgium) Jeff Jacobs
15	(Pakistan) Mohammad Bilal	4–0	50	(New Zealand) Jason Todd
47	(United States) Ajeya Prabhakar	0–4	18	(Republic of Ireland) TJ Dowling
31	(Kyrgyzstan) Mukhamed Karimberdi Uulu	2–4	34	(Switzerland) Alexander Ursenbacher
66	(Belgium) Tomasz Skalski	1–4	2	(United Arab Emirates) Mohamed Shehab

==== Finals ====
Round 3 Best of 9 frames
1	(Wales) J.R. Clarke	1
32	(Malta) B. Cini	5
17	(Northern Ireland) D. Brennan	5
16	(Thailand) I. Kachaiwong	4
9	(Scotland) M. Collumb	1
41	(Iran) A. Sarkhosh	5
25	(Egypt) M. Ibrahim	2
72	(Iran) H. Zarehdoost	5
5	(Republic of Ireland) M. Judge	5
37	(Pakistan) M. Asif	3
21	(India) M. Chandra	5
12	(China) Yuan S.	3
13	(Iran) S. Vahedi	5
20	(Scotland) C. Totten	2
29	(Wales) R. Richards	4
4	(Germany) L. Kleckers	5
3	(India) P. Advani	5
30	(Pakistan) B. Masih	3
19	(England) B. Sargeant	2
14	(Malaysia) Keen H.M.	5
11	(Thailand) T. Tirapongpaiboon	5
22	(China) Chen Z.	4
27	(Iran) A. Dinarvand	0
6	(Afghanistan) M.R. Senzahi	5
7	(Hong Kong) Ka W.C.	2
26	(Wales) A. Pagett	5
23	(India) L. Vatnani	5
10	(Belgium) J. Jacobs	0
15	(Pakistan) M. Bilal	5
18	(Republic of Ireland) T. Dowling	3
34	(Switzerland) A. Ursenbacher	5
2	(United Arab Emirates) M. Shehab	3

Round 4 Best of 9 frames
32	(Malta) B. Cini	1
17	(Northern Ireland) D. Brennan	5
41	(Iran) A. Sarkhosh	4
72	(Iran) H. Zarehdoost	5
5	(Republic of Ireland) M. Judge	5
21	(India) M. Chandra	0
13	(Iran) S. Vahedi	5
4	(Germany) L. Kleckers	4
3	(India) P. Advani	5
14	(Malaysia) Keen H.M.	3
11	(Thailand) T. Tirapongpaiboon	5
6	(Afghanistan) M.R. Senzahi	2
26	(Wales) A. Pagett	5
23	(India) L. Vatnani	2
15	(Pakistan) M. Bilal	5
34	(Switzerland) A. Ursenbacher	3

Quarter-Finals; Best of 11 frames
17	(Northern Ireland) D. Brennan	6
72	(Iran) H. Zarehdoost	1
5	(Republic of Ireland) M. Judge	1
13	(Iran) S. Vahedi	6
3	(India) P. Advani	6
11	(Thailand) T. Tirapongpaiboon	5
26	(Wales) A. Pagett	6
15	(Pakistan) M. Bilal	5

Semi-Finals; Best of 13 frames
17	(Northern Ireland) D. Brennan	6
13	(Iran) S. Vahedi	7
3	(India) P. Advani	2
26	(Wales) A. Pagett	7

Final; Best of 15 frames
13	(Iran) S. Vahedi	8
26	(Wales) A. Pagett	1
