= 2023 Snooker Shoot Out (2022–23 season) =

Snooker tournament held in January 2023

2023 BetVictor Snooker Shoot Out

Tournament information
- Dates: 25–28 January 2023
- Venue: Morningside Arena
- City: Leicester
- Country: England
- Organisation: World Snooker Tour
- Format: Ranking event
- Total prize fund: £171,000
- Winner's share: £50,000
- Highest break: Chris Wakelin (ENG) (119)

Final
- Champion: Chris Wakelin (ENG)
- Runner-up: Julien Leclercq (BEL)
- Score: 119–0 (one frame)

The 2023 Snooker Shoot Out (officially the 2023 BetVictor Snooker Shoot Out) was a professional snooker tournament that took place from 25 to 28 January 2023 at the Morningside Arena in Leicester, England. Played under a variation of the standard rules of snooker, with every match contested over a single frame, the tournament was the ninth ranking event of the 2022–23 snooker season and the sixth of eight events in the 2023 European Series. Sponsored by BetVictor, the event was broadcast by Eurosport in Europe and by multiple other broadcasters internationally. The winner received £50,000 from a total prize fund of £171,000.

Hossein Vafaei was the defending champion, having defeated Mark Williams 71‍–‍0 in the 2022 final. However, Vafaei lost 9‍–‍33 to Shaun Murphy in the first round. Aged 14 years and three months, Vladislav Gradinari became the youngest player to win a televised match at a ranking event when he defeated Ng On-yee in the first round. Reanne Evans became the first woman to win a match in a Snooker Shoot Out event, as well as the first woman to win a televised match at any ranking event, when she defeated Stuart Bingham in the first round.

In the final of the event, Chris Wakelin faced Belgian teenager Julien Leclercq, who had turned professional at the beginning of the season. Both players contested their first ranking final. Wakelin won the event with a 119 break, the highest of the four century breaks made in the tournament, to capture the first ranking title of his ten-year professional career.

== Tournament format ==
The tournament was played using a variation of the traditional snooker rules. The draw was randomised before each round. All matches were played over a single frame, each of which lasted up to 10 minutes. The event featured a variable shot clock; shots played in the first five minutes were allowed 15 seconds while the final five had a 10-second timer. All foul shots awarded the opponent a ball in hand. Unlike traditional snooker, if a ball did not hit a cushion on every shot, it was a foul. Rather than a coin toss, a lag was used to choose which player breaks. In the event of a draw, each player received a shot at the blue ball. This is known as a "blue ball shootout". The player who potted the ball with the cue ball from inside the "D" and the blue ball on its spot with the opponent missing won the match.

=== Prize fund ===
The total prize fund for the event is £171,000 with the winner receiving £50,000. The breakdown of prize money is shown below:

- Winner: £50,000
- Runner-up: £20,000
- Semi-final: £8,000
- Quarter-final: £4,000
- Last 16: £2,000
- Last 32: £1,000
- Last 64: £500
- Last 128: £250 (Note: The prize money for losing in the first round did not count towards the world rankings.)
- Highest break: £5,000
- Total: £171,000

== Tournament draw ==
All times in Greenwich Mean Time. Times for quarter-finals, semi-finals and final are approximate. Players in bold denote match winners.

=== Round 1 ===
==== 25 January – 13:00 ====
- Hossein Vafaei (IRN) 9–**33** **Shaun Murphy** (ENG)
- **Vladislav Gradinari** (MDA) **40**–1 Ng On-yee (HKG)
- **Jamie O'Neill** (ENG) **55**–2 Ryan Thomerson (AUS)
- Liam Graham (SCO) 21–**43** **Cao Yupeng** (CHN)
- Ian Martin (ENG) 23–**42** **Thepchaiya Un-Nooh** (THA)
- Luke Simmonds (ENG) 21–**45** **Sam Craigie** (ENG)
- **Robbie McGuigan** (NIR) **52**–3 Hammad Miah (ENG)
- James Cahill (ENG) 15–**50** **Jordan Brown** (NIR)
- **Joe Perry** (ENG) **85**–0 Luca Brecel (BEL)
- **Lukas Kleckers** (GER) **52**–1 Rod Lawler (ENG)
- Joe O'Connor (ENG) 20–**28** **Dylan Emery** (WAL)
- **Barry Pinches** (ENG) **16**–12 Michael Judge (IRL)
- Anthony Hamilton (ENG) 21–**34** **Ben Mertens** (BEL)
- Andy Hicks (ENG) 4–**60** **Rory McLeod** (JAM)
- Jack Borwick (SCO) 11–**50** **Ali Carter** (ENG)
- **Mark Williams** (WAL) **98**–0 Craig Steadman (ENG)

==== 25 January – 19:00 ====
- **Jack Lisowski** (ENG) **36**–29 Mark Allen (NIR)
- **Martin Gould** (ENG) **75**–20 Jamie Clarke (WAL)
- **Alexander Ursenbacher** (SUI) **27**–20 Aaron Hill (IRL)
- **Robbie Williams** (ENG) **87**–0 Mink Nutcharut (THA)
- Mark Joyce (ENG) 14–**18** **Victor Sarkis** (BRA)
- **Robert Milkins** (ENG) **47**–14 Andy Lee (HKG)
- Sean O'Sullivan (ENG) 13–**26** **Dean Young** (SCO)
- Andrew Pagett (WAL) 20–**40** **Ashley Hugill** (ENG)
- Stephen Maguire (SCO) 9–**33** **Ken Doherty** (IRL)
- **Jamie Jones** (WAL) **70**–16 Jenson Kendrick (ENG)
- **Ben Woollaston** (ENG) **64**–1 Sanderson Lam (ENG)
- Muhammad Asif (PAK) 21–**42** **Gerard Greene** (NIR)
- **Louis Heathcote** (ENG) **66**–8 Oliver Lines (ENG)
- Jimmy White (ENG) 7–**44** **Adam Duffy** (ENG)
- Peng Yisong (CHN) 1–**65** **Daniel Wells** (WAL)
- Barry Hawkins (ENG) 1–**37** **Jackson Page** (WAL)

==== 26 January – 13:00 ====
- **Riley Powell** (WAL) **41**–31 Kyren Wilson (ENG)
- Andres Petrov (EST) 4–**113** **Noppon Saengkham** (THA)
- Zak Surety (ENG) 24–**71** **Fergal O'Brien** (IRL)
- **Fan Zhengyi** (CHN) **68**–21 Ding Junhui (CHN)
- **Michael Georgiou** (CYP) **75**–1 Tian Pengfei (CHN)
- Matthew Stevens (WAL) 49–**54** (Note: Dominic Dale beat Matthew Stevens in a sudden death blue ball shootout after the match frame finished level at 49–49.) **Dominic Dale** (WAL)
- **John Astley** (ENG) **36**–32 Pang Junxu (CHN)
- Peter Lines (ENG) 13–**34** **Julien Leclercq** (BEL)
- **David Grace** (ENG) **37**–11 Lyu Haotian (CHN)
- Mark King (ENG) 17–**29** **Jak Jones** (WAL)
- Lei Peifan (CHN) 0–**116** **Michael Holt** (ENG)
- **Yuan Sijun** (CHN) **60**–43 Rebecca Kenna (ENG)
- Zhang Anda (CHN) 29–**46** **Callum Beresford** (ENG)
- Duane Jones (WAL) 46–**78** **Zhou Yuelong** (CHN)
- **Dechawat Poomjaeng** (THA) **33**–14 Si Jiahui (CHN)
- **Jimmy Robertson** (ENG) **56**–1 Ryan Day (WAL)

==== 26 January – 19:00 ====
- **Mark Davis** (ENG) **22**–20 Mark Selby (ENG)
- **Alfie Burden** (ENG) **73**–0 Ian Burns (ENG)
- **Liam Highfield** (ENG) **61**–1 Florian Nüßle (AUT)
- **Michael White** (WAL) **72**–1 Mitchell Mann (ENG)
- **David Lilley** (ENG) **32**–16 Oliver Brown (ENG)
- **Asjad Iqbal** (PAK) **35**–30 David Gilbert (ENG)
- Stuart Bingham (ENG) 8–**60** **Reanne Evans** (ENG)
- Ricky Walden (ENG) 1–**90** **Gary Wilson** (ENG)
- **Steven Hallworth** (ENG) **38**–18 Stuart Carrington (ENG)
- **Xiao Guodong** (CHN) **106**–1 Anton Kazakov (UKR)
- **Elliot Slessor** (ENG) **43**–42 Allan Taylor (ENG)
- Farakh Ajaib (PAK) 25–**30** (Note: Chris Wakelin beat Farakh Ajaib in a sudden death blue ball shootout after the match frame finished level at 25–25.) **Chris Wakelin** (ENG)
- **Xu Si** (CHN) **73**–0 Matthew Selt (ENG)
- **Ross Muir** (SCO) **48**–10 Wu Yize (CHN)
- Himanshu Jain (IND) 25–**61** **Tom Ford** (ENG)
- Mohamed Ibrahim (EGY) 14–**51** **Haydon Pinhey** (ENG)

=== Round 2 ===
==== 27 January – 13:00 ====
- Shaun Murphy (ENG) 0–**89** **Mark Davis** (ENG)
- **David Grace** (ENG) **50**–46 Ashley Hugill (ENG)
- Barry Pinches (ENG) 22–**42** **Cao Yupeng** (CHN)
- **Joe Perry** (ENG) **30**–16 Jamie Jones (WAL)
- Ken Doherty (IRL) 0–**76** **Dominic Dale** (WAL)
- **Asjad Iqbal** (PAK) **73**–33 Jimmy Robertson (ENG)
- **David Lilley** (ENG) **67**–7 Elliot Slessor (ENG)
- **Jak Jones** (WAL) **54**–32 Michael Georgiou (CYP)
- Robert Milkins (ENG) 4–**83** **Alexander Ursenbacher** (SUI)
- **Julien Leclercq** (BEL) **93**–5 Haydon Pinhey (ENG)
- **Chris Wakelin** (ENG) **49**–7 Alfie Burden (ENG)
- Ben Mertens (BEL) 52–**55** **Fan Zhengyi** (CHN)
- **Zhou Yuelong** (CHN) **52**–31 Robbie Williams (ENG)
- Jackson Page (WAL) 32–**69** **Fergal O'Brien** (IRL)
- Gerard Greene (NIR) 37–**55** **Ali Carter** (ENG)
- **Michael Holt** (ENG) **37**–13 Robbie McGuigan (NIR)

==== 27 January – 19:00 ====
- **Daniel Wells** (WAL) **38**–2 Riley Powell (WAL)
- **Vladislav Gradinari** (MDA) **42**–20 Victor Sarkis (BRA)
- **Ben Woollaston** (ENG) **13**–9 Rory McLeod (JAM)
- Sam Craigie (ENG) 17–**87** **Lukas Kleckers** (GER)
- Thepchaiya Un-Nooh (THA) 40–**62** **Dechawat Poomjaeng** (THA)
- Jordan Brown (NIR) 0–**68** **Yuan Sijun** (CHN)
- **Gary Wilson** (ENG) **83**–4 Reanne Evans (ENG)
- Ross Muir (SCO) 22–**29** **Tom Ford** (ENG)
- **Mark Williams** (WAL) **45**–41 Dean Young (SCO)
- Jamie O'Neill (ENG) 12–**44** **Martin Gould** (ENG)
- John Astley (ENG) 7–**53** **Dylan Emery** (WAL)
- Steven Hallworth (ENG) 23–**65** **Noppon Saengkham** (THA)
- **Liam Highfield** (ENG) **57**–35 Louis Heathcote (ENG)
- **Michael White** (WAL) **39**–7 Callum Beresford (ENG)
- **Xu Si** (CHN) **46**–30 Xiao Guodong (CHN)
- **Jack Lisowski** (ENG) **53**–7 Adam Duffy (ENG)

=== Round 3 ===
==== 28 January – 13:00 ====
- Cao Yupeng (CHN) 0–**129** **Ali Carter** (ENG)
- Fergal O'Brien (IRL) 21–**39** **Julien Leclercq** (BEL)
- **Tom Ford** (ENG) **91**–28 Vladislav Gradinari (MDA)
- **Dominic Dale** (WAL) **63**–30 Asjad Iqbal (PAK)
- Fan Zhengyi (CHN) 0–**126** **Michael Holt** (ENG)
- **David Grace** (ENG) **49**–5 David Lilley (ENG)
- **Daniel Wells** (WAL) **32**–19 Ben Woollaston (ENG)
- **Michael White** (WAL) **56**–31 Alexander Ursenbacher (SUI)
- Joe Perry (ENG) 14–**33** **Chris Wakelin** (ENG)
- **Jak Jones** (WAL) **28**–8 Xu Si (CHN)
- Lukas Kleckers (GER) 27–**35** **Yuan Sijun** (CHN)
- **Zhou Yuelong** (CHN) **76**–22 Gary Wilson (ENG)
- Dylan Emery (WAL) 0–**120** **Noppon Saengkham** (THA)
- **Liam Highfield** (ENG) **80**–0 Martin Gould (ENG)
- Mark Davis (ENG) 22–**62** **Jack Lisowski** (ENG)
- Mark Williams (WAL) 12–**53** **Dechawat Poomjaeng** (THA)

=== Round 4 ===
==== 28 January – 19:00 ====
- **Tom Ford** (ENG) **20**–14 Ali Carter (ENG)
- Yuan Sijun (CHN) 47–**53** **Julien Leclercq** (BEL)
- **Dominic Dale** (WAL) **72**–0 Zhou Yuelong (CHN)
- **Michael White** (WAL) **50**–9 David Grace (ENG)
- **Chris Wakelin** (ENG) **38**–35 Jak Jones (WAL)
- Noppon Saengkham (THA) 36–**50** **Daniel Wells** (WAL)
- **Michael Holt** (ENG) **47**–38 Jack Lisowski (ENG)
- **Liam Highfield** (ENG) **79**–3 Dechawat Poomjaeng (THA)

=== Quarter-finals ===
==== 28 January – 21:00 ====
- **Daniel Wells** (WAL) **57**–16 Tom Ford (ENG)
- Liam Highfield (ENG) 32–**75** **Dominic Dale** (WAL)
- Michael Holt (ENG) 23–**30** **Julien Leclercq** (BEL)
- **Chris Wakelin** (ENG) **42**–22 Michael White (WAL)

=== Semi-finals ===
==== 28 January – 22:00 ====
- Daniel Wells (WAL) 23–**46** **Chris Wakelin** (ENG)
- Dominic Dale (WAL) 8–**98** **Julien Leclercq** (BEL)

=== Final ===
Final: 1 frame. Referee: Kevin Dabrowski; Morningside Arena, Leicester, England, 28 January 2023 – 22:30
**Chris Wakelin**; England	**119**–0	Julien Leclercq; Belgium

== Century breaks ==
A total of four century breaks were made during the tournament.

- 119 – Chris Wakelin
- 117 – Ali Carter
- 116 – Michael Holt
- 106 – Xiao Guodong
