= Amir Sarkhosh =

Iranian snooker player

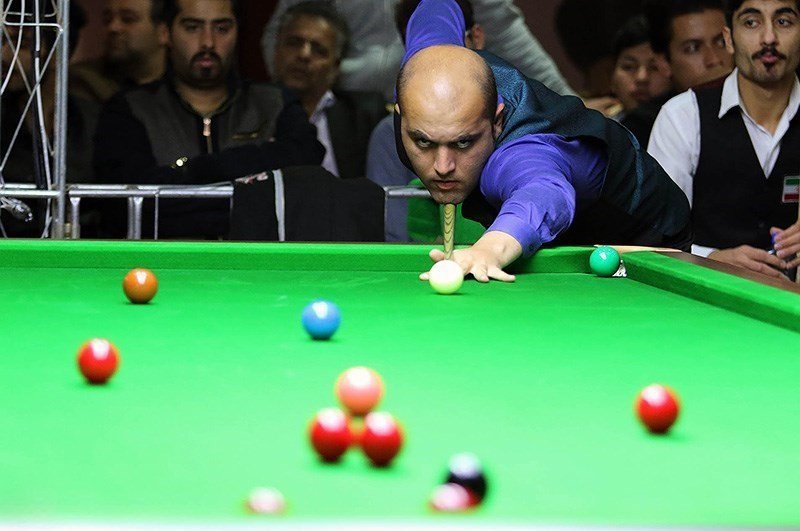
- Sarkhosh pictured in 2016

Personal information
- Born: 30 May 1991 (age 35)

Sport
- Country: Iran
- Sport: Snooker
- Professional: 2024–2026
- Highest ranking: 75 (July 2025)
- Best ranking finish: Last 16 (2025 Championship League)

Amir Sarkhosh (born 30 May 1991) is an Iranian former professional snooker player from Karaj who has won the Asian Snooker Championship three times.

== Career ==
=== Amateur career ===
Since 2004, Sarkhosh regularly participated in international tournaments, initially with only modest success. In 2008, he reached the main round of the Amateur World Championship for the first time and the quarter‑finals of the under‑21 Asian Championship. Two more quarter‑finals of international under‑21 championships followed in 2012. In 2013, he reached the final of the Asian Six‑Red Snooker Championship, but lost to Muhammad Asif. He then received an invitation to the men's Six‑Red snooker tournament at the 2013 Asian Indoor and Martial Arts Games. There he also reached the final, but lost again, this time to Xiao Guodong. The following year, he reached the final of the 6‑Red Asian Championship again and won his first international title against Boonyarit Keattikun. He was invited to the 2013 and 2014 editions of the professional 6‑Red World Championship, where he was eliminated in the group stage. Just a few days after his success at the 6‑Red Asian Championship, he and Ehsan Heydari Nezhad also reached the final of the team tournament that followed. However, they lost to the Indian team.

He achieved further notable successes with a quarter‑final appearance at the 2014 IBSF World Snooker Championship and semi‑final appearances at the 2013 and 2016 Asian Championships. During this time he achieved his best results in team tournaments. Together with Soheil Vahedi he won the Asian Team Championship in 2015 and 2016; and the IBSF World Team Cup in 2016, after they had already taken second place there in 2013. The pair then won a gold medal in the snooker team competition at the 2017 Asian Indoor and Martial Arts Games together with Hossein Vafaei. He reached the final of the 2017 IBSF World Snooker Championship, but lost to Pankaj Advani. He had another title win in 2018 when he won the Asian Snooker Championship with a victory over Ali Gharahgozlou.

In 2019 he won the 6‑Red Asian Championship again. He reached the final of his first tournament, the 2021 Asian Championship, but lost to Advani. He reached the final of the 2021 IBSF World Snooker Championship, but lost to Ahsan Ramzan. At the 2022 Asian Championship he won another major international title when he defeated Ishpreet Singh Chadha in the final. In the same year, he again reached the finals of the 6‑Red Asian Championship and the 2022 IBSF World Snooker Championship, which he lost to fellow countryman Siyavosh Mozayani and Malaysian champion Lim Kok Leong respectively. The following year, he won his third title at the Asian Championship, equalling record winner James Wattana. A few months later, he won the 6‑Red Asian Championship for the third time.

=== 2024/2025 season ===
Sarkhosh earned a place on the professional tour for the first time in 2024 by coming through the WPBSA Q Tour Global Play‑Offs. He had his first win of the season by beating amateur player Joshua Thomond 5‍–‍3 in qualification for the 2024 Xi'an Grand Prix. He beat David Lilley 6‍–‍3 in qualification for the 2024 International Championship, but his most significant win to date was a 5‍–‍3 defeat of world number 21 David Gilbert in qualification for the 2025 World Open.

== Performance and rankings timeline ==
Tournament	2013/ 14	2014/ 15	2023/ 24	2024/ 25	2025/ 26
Ranking (Note: It shows the ranking at the beginning of the season)	(Note: He was an amateur)			(Note: New players on the Main Tour don't have a ranking)	75
Ranking tournaments
Championship League	Non-Ranking		A	A	2R
Saudi Arabia Masters	Not Held			3R	3R
Wuhan Open	Not Held			LQ	LQ
English Open	Not Held		A	LQ	1R
British Open	Not Held		A	LQ	1R
Xi'an Grand Prix	Not Held			1R	LQ
Northern Ireland Open	Not Held		A	LQ	LQ
International Championship	A	A	A	1R	LQ
UK Championship	A	A	A	LQ	LQ
Shoot Out	Non-Ranking		A	1R	3R
Scottish Open	Not Held		A	LQ	1R
German Masters	A	A	A	LQ	LQ
World Grand Prix	NH	NR	DNQ	DNQ	DNQ
Players Championship	DNQ	DNQ	DNQ	DNQ	DNQ
Welsh Open	A	A	A	LQ	1R
World Open	A	NH	A	1R	LQ
Tour Championship	Not Held		DNQ	DNQ	DNQ
World Championship	A	A	LQ	LQ	LQ
Former non-ranking tournaments
Six-red World Championship	RR	RR	Not Held		

Performance Table Legend
LQ	lost in the qualifying draw	#R	lost in the early rounds of the tournament (WR = Wildcard round, RR = Round robin)	QF	lost in the quarter-finals
SF	lost in the semi-finals	F	lost in the final	W	won the tournament
DNQ	did not qualify for the tournament	A	did not participate in the tournament	WD	withdrew from the tournament

NH / Not Held	means an event was not held.
NR / Non-Ranking Event	means an event is/was no longer a ranking event.
R / Ranking Event	means an event is/was a ranking event.
MR / Minor-Ranking Event	means an event is/was a minor-ranking event.

== Career finals ==
=== Amateur finals: 14 (6 titles) ===
Outcome	No.	Year	Tournament	Opponent	Score
Runner-up	1.	2013	Asian 6-Reds Championship	Muhammad Asif (PAK)	4–7
Runner-up	2.	2013	Asian Indoor and Martial Arts Games	Xiao Guodong (CHN)	4–5
Winner	1.	2014	Asian 6-Reds Championship	Boonyarit Keattikun (THA)	7–6
Runner-up	3.	2017	IBSF World Snooker Championship	Pankaj Advani (IND)	2–8
Winner	2.	2018	ACBS Asian Snooker Championship	Ali Gharahgozlou (IRN)	6–1
Winner	3.	2019	Asian 6-Reds Championship (2)	Babar Masih (PAK)	7–4
Runner-up	4.	2021	ACBS Asian Snooker Championship	Pankaj Advani (IND)	3–6
Runner-up	5.	2022 (Note: Although it was held in 2022, this was the (postponed) championship for 2021.)	IBSF World Snooker Championship (2)	Ahsan Ramzan (PAK)	5–6
Winner	4.	2022	ACBS Asian Snooker Championship (2)	Ishpreet Singh Chadha (IND)	5–0
Runner-up	6.	2022	Asian 6-Reds Championship (2)	Siyavosh Mozayani (IRN)	4–5
Runner-up	7.	2022	IBSF World Snooker Championship (3)	Lim Kok Leong (MAS)	0–5
Winner	5.	2023	ACBS Asian Snooker Championship (3)	Rory Thor (MAS)	5–1
Winner	6.	2023	Asian 6-Reds Championship (3)	Chau Hon Man (HKG)	6–2
Runner-up	8.	2025	ACBS Asian Snooker Championship (2)	Pankaj Advani (IND)	1–4

=== Team finals: 6 (4 titles) ===
Outcome	No.	Year	Tournament	Team partners	Opponents	Score
Runners-up	1.	2013	Asian Team Snooker Championship	Ehsan Heydari Nezhad (IRN)	Alok Kumar (IND); Brijesh Damani (IND); Manan Chandra (IND)	0–3
Runners-up	2.	2013	IBSF World Team Cup	Soheil Vahedi (IRN)	Muhammad Asif (PAK); Muhammad Sajjad (PAK)	3–5
Winners	1.	2015	Asian Team Snooker Championship	Soheil Vahedi (IRN)	Ali Gharahgozlou (IRN); Ehsan Heydari Nezhad (IRN)	3–0
Winners	2.	2016	Asian Team Snooker Championship (2)	Soheil Vahedi (IRN)	Pankaj Advani (IND); Aditya Mehta (IND); Manan Chandra (IND)	3–2
Winners	3.	2016	IBSF World Team Cup	Soheil Vahedi (IRN)	Chen Zifan (CHN); Yuan Sijun (CHN)	5–2
Winners	4.	2017	Asian Indoor and Martial Arts Games	Hossein Vafaei (IRN); Soheil Vahedi (IRN)	Ahmed Saif (QAT); Ali Al Obaidli (QAT); Khamis Al Obaidli (QAT)	3–0
