= 2015 Six-red World Championship =

Six-red World Championship
Tournament information
- Dates: 7–13 September 2015
- Venue: Fashion Island Shopping Mall
- City: Bangkok
- Country: Thailand
- Organisation: WPBSA
- Total prize fund: 8,000,000 baht
- Winner's share: 2,500,000 baht
- Highest break: (England) Mark Davis (80)

Final
- Champion: (Thailand) Thepchaiya Un-Nooh
- Runner-up: (China) Liang Wenbo
- Score: 8–2

The 2015 Six-red World Championship (often styled the 2015 SangSom 6-red World Championship for sponsorship and marketing purposes) was a six-red snooker tournament that was held between 7 and 13 September 2015 at the Fashion Island Shopping Mall in Bangkok, Thailand.

Stephen Maguire was the defending champion, but lost 4–6 against Judd Trump in the last 32.

Thepchaiya Un-Nooh won in the final 8–2 against Liang Wenbo.

== Prize money ==
The breakdown of prize money for this year is shown below:

- Winner: 2,500,000 baht
- Runner-up: 1,000,000 baht
- Semi-finalists: 500,000 baht
- Quarter-finalists: 250,000 baht
- Last 16: 125,000 baht
- Last 32: 62,500 baht
- Group stage: 31,250 baht
- Total: 8,000,000 baht

== Round-robin stage ==
The top four players from each group qualified for the knock-out stage. All matches were best of 9 frames.

=== Group A ===
| POS | Player | MP | MW | FW | FL | FD | PTS |
|---|---|---|---|---|---|---|---|
| 1 | (India) Pankaj Advani | 5 | 4 | 22 | 8 | +14 | 4 |
| 2 | (Thailand) Thanawat Thirapongpaiboon | 5 | 4 | 13 | 13 | +10 | 4 |
| 3 | (China) Liang Wenbo | 5 | 4 | 21 | 12 | +9 | 4 |
| 4 | (Scotland) Stephen Maguire | 5 | 2 | 14 | 20 | −6 | 2 |
| 5 | (Ukraine) Alan Trigg | 5 | 1 | 12 | 24 | −12 | 1 |
| 6 | (Australia) Hassan Kerde | 5 | 0 | 10 | 25 | −15 | 0 |

- Stephen Maguire 2–5 Pankaj Advani
- Liang Wenbo 5–2 Hassan Kerde
- Alan Trigg 3–5 Thanawat Thirapongpaiboon
- Stephen Maguire 1–5 Thanawat Thirapongpaiboon
- Liang Wenbo 5–1 Alan Trigg
- Hassan Kerde 0–5 Pankaj Advani
- Stephen Maguire 5–3 Alan Trigg
- Liang Wenbo 1–5 Pankaj Advani
- Hassan Kerde 2–5 Thanawat Thirapongpaiboon
- Alan Trigg 0–5 Pankaj Advani
- Liang Wenbo 5–3 Thanawat Thirapongpaiboon
- Stephen Maguire 5–2 Hassan Kerde
- Alan Trigg 5–4 Hassan Kerde
- Stephen Maguire 1–5 Liang Wenbo
- Pankaj Advani 2–5 Thanawat Thirapongpaiboon

=== Group B ===
| POS | Player | MP | MW | FW | FL | FD | PTS |
|---|---|---|---|---|---|---|---|
| 1 | (Scotland) Anthony McGill | 5 | 5 | 25 | 14 | +11 | 5 |
| 2 | (England) Matthew Selt | 5 | 4 | 22 | 13 | +9 | 4 |
| 3 | (Pakistan) Muhammad Sajjad | 5 | 3 | 22 | 20 | +2 | 3 |
| 4 | (Thailand) Boonyarit Keattikun | 5 | 1 | 17 | 21 | −4 | 1 |
| 5 | (Scotland) John Higgins | 5 | 1 | 16 | 23 | −7 | 1 |
| 6 | (China) Yuan Sijun | 5 | 1 | 13 | 24 | −11 | 1 |

- John Higgins 4–5 Yuan Sijun
- Matthew Selt 5–3 Muhammad Sajjad
- Anthony McGill 5–4 Boonyarit Keattikun
- John Higgins 5–3 Boonyarit Keattikun
- Matthew Selt 2–5 Anthony McGill
- Muhammad Sajjad 5–4 Yuan Sijun
- John Higgins 3–5 Muhammad Sajjad
- Matthew Selt 5–2 Boonyarit Keattikun
- Anthony McGill 5–1 Yuan Sijun
- John Higgins 3–5 Anthony McGill
- Muhammad Sajjad 5–3 Boonyarit Keattikun
- Matthew Selt 5–2 Yuan Sijun
- John Higgins 1–5 Matthew Selt
- Yuan Sijun 1–5 Boonyarit Keattikun
- Anthony McGill 5–4 Muhammad Sajjad

=== Group C ===
| POS | Player | MP | MW | FW | FL | FD | PTS |
|---|---|---|---|---|---|---|---|
| 1 | (England) Judd Trump | 5 | 5 | 25 | 5 | +20 | 5 |
| 2 | (Iceland) Kristján Helgason | 5 | 4 | 21 | 16 | +5 | 4 |
| 3 | (Pakistan) Muhammad Asif | 5 | 2 | 19 | 18 | +1 | 2 |
| 4 | (Wales) Michael White | 5 | 2 | 17 | 19 | −2 | 2 |
| 5 | (Thailand) Noppadon Noppachorn | 5 | 2 | 17 | 20 | −3 | 2 |
| 6 | (Egypt) Ahmed Galal | 5 | 0 | 4 | 25 | −21 | 0 |

- Judd Trump 5–0 Ahmed Galal
- Michael White 5–3 Muhammad Asif
- Kristján Helgason 5–3 Noppadon Noppachorn
- Michael White 4–5 Noppadon Noppachorn
- Muhammad Asif 5–0 Ahmed Galal
- Judd Trump 5–1 Noppadon Noppachorn
- Michael White 2–5 Kristján Helgason
- Ahmed Galal 1–5 Noppadon Noppachorn
- Judd Trump 5–1 Michael White
- Kristján Helgason 5–4 Muhammad Asif
- Michael White 5–1 Ahmed Galal
- Muhammad Asif 5–3 Noppadon Noppachorn
- Judd Trump 5–1 Kristján Helgason
- Judd Trump 5–2 Muhammad Asif
- Kristján Helgason 5–2 Ahmed Galal

=== Group D ===
| POS | Player | MP | MW | FW | FL | FD | PTS |
|---|---|---|---|---|---|---|---|
| 1 | (England) Michael Holt | 5 | 4 | 23 | 15 | +8 | 4 |
| 2 | (Scotland) Graeme Dott | 5 | 3 | 20 | 12 | +8 | 3 |
| 3 | (China) Ding Junhui | 5 | 3 | 22 | 15 | +7 | 3 |
| 4 | (Thailand) Phaitoon Phonbun | 5 | 2 | 15 | 16 | −1 | 2 |
| 5 | (Australia) Ben Judge | 5 | 2 | 11 | 22 | −11 | 2 |
| 6 | (Iran) Ehsan Heydari Nezhad | 5 | 1 | 12 | 23 | −11 | 1 |

- Ben Judge 5–4 Ehsan Heydari Nezhad
- Ding Junhui 5–1 Phaitoon Phonbun
- Graeme Dott 1–5 Michael Holt
- Graeme Dott 5–0 Ben Judge
- Michael Holt 5–3 Phaitoon Phonbun
- Michael Holt 5–2 Ehsan Heydari Nezhad
- Graeme Dott 5–1 Phaitoon Phonbun
- Ding Junhui 5–0 Ben Judge
- Ding Junhui 3–5 Ehsan Heydari Nezhad
- Graeme Dott 5–1 Ehsan Heydari Nezhad
- Ding Junhui 4–5 Michael Holt
- Ben Judge 1–5 Phaitoon Phonbun
- Ehsan Heydari Nezhad 0–5 Phaitoon Phonbun
- Ding Junhui 5–4 Graeme Dott
- Michael Holt 3–5 Ben Judge

=== Group E ===
| POS | Player | MP | MW | FW | FL | FD | PTS |
|---|---|---|---|---|---|---|---|
| 1 | (England) Mark Davis | 5 | 5 | 25 | 9 | +16 | 5 |
| 2 | (Thailand) Noppon Saengkham | 5 | 3 | 21 | 18 | +3 | 3 |
| 3 | (England) Stuart Bingham | 5 | 3 | 19 | 16 | +3 | 3 |
| 4 | (China) Yan Bingtao | 5 | 3 | 20 | 18 | +2 | 3 |
| 5 | (Iran) Soheil Vahedi | 5 | 1 | 13 | 22 | −9 | 1 |
| 6 | (Scotland) Craig MacGillivray | 5 | 0 | 10 | 25 | −15 | 0 |

- Soheil Vahedi 2–5 Noppon Saengkham
- Stuart Bingham 5–0 Soheil Vahedi
- Mark Davis 5–2 Yan Bingtao
- Craig MacGillivray 3–5 Noppon Saengkham
- Stuart Bingham 5–3 Yan Bingtao
- Craig MacGillivray 2–5 Soheil Vahedi
- Mark Davis 5–3 Noppon Saengkham
- Yan Bingtao 5–4 Soheil Vahedi
- Stuart Bingham 3–5 Noppon Saengkham
- Mark Davis 5–1 Craig MacGillivray
- Stuart Bingham 1–5 Mark Davis
- Craig MacGillivray 1–5 Yan Bingtao
- Mark Davis 5–2 Soheil Vahedi
- Yan Bingtao 5–3 Noppon Saengkham
- Stuart Bingham 5–3 Craig MacGillivray

=== Group F ===
| POS | Player | MP | MW | FW | FL | FD | PTS |
|---|---|---|---|---|---|---|---|
| 1 | (England) Robert Milkins | 5 | 4 | 20 | 8 | +12 | 4 |
| 2 | (England) Joe Perry | 5 | 3 | 21 | 16 | +5 | 3 |
| 3 | (Pakistan) Asjad Iqbal | 5 | 3 | 17 | 19 | −2 | 3 |
| 4 | (Thailand) James Wattana | 5 | 2 | 17 | 18 | −1 | 2 |
| 5 | (Wales) Matthew Stevens | 5 | 2 | 15 | 18 | −3 | 2 |
| 6 | (Malaysia) Thor Chuan Leong | 5 | 1 | 11 | 22 | −11 | 1 |

- Joe Perry 5–2 Thor Chuan Leong
- Robert Milkins 5–1 Asjad Iqbal
- Matthew Stevens 2–5 James Wattana
- Asjad Iqbal 5–2 James Wattana
- Joe Perry 2–5 Matthew Stevens
- Joe Perry 5–0 Robert Milkins
- Thor Chuan Leong 1–5 James Wattana
- Matthew Stevens 5–1 Asjad Iqbal
- Asjad Iqbal 5–3 Thor Chuan Leong
- Joe Perry 5–4 James Wattana
- Robert Milkins 5–1 Matthew Stevens
- Robert Milkins 5–0 Thor Chuan Leong
- Robert Milkins 5–1 James Wattana
- Joe Perry 4–5 Asjad Iqbal
- Matthew Stevens 2–5 Thor Chuan Leong

=== Group G ===
| POS | Player | MP | MW | FW | FL | FD | PTS |
|---|---|---|---|---|---|---|---|
| 1 | (Wales) Mark Williams | 5 | 4 | 22 | 14 | +8 | 4 |
| 2 | (Thailand) Thepchaiya Un-Nooh | 5 | 4 | 24 | 18 | +6 | 4 |
| 3 | (Wales) Jamie Clarke | 5 | 3 | 19 | 14 | +5 | 3 |
| 4 | (Hong Kong) Marco Fu | 5 | 3 | 20 | 17 | +3 | 3 |
| 5 | (South Africa) Peter Francisco | 5 | 1 | 14 | 21 | −7 | 1 |
| 6 | (Switzerland) Darren Paris | 5 | 0 | 10 | 25 | −15 | 0 |

- Darren Paris 1–5 Jamie Clarke
- Darren Paris 3–5 Thepchaiya Un-Nooh
- Marco Fu 5–1 Peter Francisco
- Mark Williams 2–5 Jamie Clarke
- Marco Fu 5–2 Jamie Clarke
- Darren Paris 1–5 Peter Francisco
- Mark Williams 5–4 Thepchaiya Un-Nooh
- Jamie Clarke 2–5 Thepchaiya Un-Nooh
- Marco Fu 5–4 Darren Paris
- Mark Williams 5–3 Peter Francisco
- Marco Fu 1–5 Mark Williams
- Peter Francisco 4–5 Thepchaiya Un-Nooh
- Jamie Clarke 5–1 Peter Francisco
- Marco Fu 4–5 Thepchaiya Un-Nooh
- Mark Williams 5–1 Darren Paris

=== Group H ===
| POS | Player | MP | MW | FW | FL | FD | PTS |
|---|---|---|---|---|---|---|---|
| 1 | (England) Mark Selby | 5 | 4 | 24 | 9 | +15 | 4 |
| 2 | (Wales) Ryan Day | 5 | 4 | 23 | 11 | +12 | 4 |
| 3 | (Republic of Ireland) Ken Doherty | 5 | 3 | 18 | 17 | +1 | 3 |
| 4 | (Northern Ireland) Joe Swail | 5 | 2 | 14 | 17 | −3 | 2 |
| 5 | (Thailand) Akani Songsermsawad | 5 | 2 | 12 | 17 | −5 | 2 |
| 6 | (Egypt) Wael Talat | 5 | 0 | 5 | 25 | −20 | 0 |

- Ryan Day 5–0 Wael Talat
- Mark Selby 5–1 Joe Swail
- Ken Doherty 5–1 Akani Songsermsawad
- Ryan Day 5–1 Joe Swail
- Akani Songsermsawad 5–0 Wael Talat
- Mark Selby 5–2 Ken Doherty
- Ryan Day 5–1 Akani Songsermsawad
- Ken Doherty 1–5 Joe Swail
- Mark Selby 5–1 Wael Talat
- Wael Talat 1–5 Joe Swail
- Mark Selby 5–0 Akani Songsermsawad
- Ryan Day 3–5 Ken Doherty
- Ken Doherty 5–3 Wael Talat
- Joe Swail 2–5 Akani Songsermsawad
- Mark Selby 4–5 Ryan Day

== Knockout stage ==
Last 32; Best of 11 frames
(India) Pankaj Advani | 2
(Wales) Michael White | 6
(Thailand) Noppon Saengkham | 6
(Wales) Jamie Clarke | 5
(England) Joe Perry | 6
(Republic of Ireland) Ken Doherty | 1
(Scotland) Anthony McGill | 6
(Thailand) Phaitoon Phonbun | 4
(England) Judd Trump | 6
(Scotland) Stephen Maguire | 4
(Thailand) Thepchaiya Un-Nooh | 6
(England) Stuart Bingham | 3
(Wales) Ryan Day | 6
(Pakistan) Asjad Iqbal | 3
(England) Michael Holt | 3
(Thailand) Boonyarit Keattikun | 6
(England) Mark Davis | 4
(Hong Kong) Marco Fu | 6
(Thailand) Thanawat Thirapongpaiboon | 2
(Pakistan) Muhammad Asif | 6
(England) Matthew Selt | 6
(China) Ding Junhui | 2
(England) Robert Milkins | 6
(Northern Ireland) Joe Swail | 5
(Wales) Mark Williams | 4
(China) Yan Bingtao | 6
(Iceland) Kristján Helgason | 1
(China) Liang Wenbo | 6
(Scotland) Graeme Dott | 3
(Pakistan) Muhammad Sajjad | 6
(England) Mark Selby | 6
(Thailand) James Wattana | 0

Last 16; Best of 11 frames
(Wales) Michael White | 5
(Thailand) Noppon Saengkham | 6
(England) Joe Perry | 6
(Scotland) Anthony McGill | 1
(England) Judd Trump | 3
(Thailand) Thepchaiya Un-Nooh | 6
(Wales) Ryan Day | 4
(Thailand) Boonyarit Keattikun | 6
(Hong Kong) Marco Fu | 6
(Pakistan) Muhammad Asif | 2
(England) Matthew Selt | 6
(England) Robert Milkins | 2
(China) Yan Bingtao | 4
(China) Liang Wenbo | 6
(Pakistan) Muhammad Sajjad | 2
(England) Mark Selby | 6

Quarter-finals; Best of 13 frames
(Thailand) Noppon Saengkham | 7
(England) Joe Perry | 5
(Thailand) Thepchaiya Un-Nooh | 7
(Thailand) Boonyarit Keattikun | 1
(Hong Kong) Marco Fu | 3
(England) Matthew Selt | 7
(China) Liang Wenbo | 7
(England) Mark Selby | 4

Semi-finals; Best of 13 frames
(Thailand) Noppon Saengkham | 3
(Thailand) Thepchaiya Un-Nooh | 7
(England) Matthew Selt | 4
(China) Liang Wenbo | 7

Final; Best of 15 frames
(Thailand) Thepchaiya Un-Nooh | 8
(China) Liang Wenbo | 2

== Maximum breaks ==
(Note: A maximum break in six-red snooker is 75.)

- Judd Trump (2 times)
- Ken Doherty
- Liang Wenbo

Highest break: Mark Davis: 80
