= Peng Yisong =

Chinese snooker player

Personal information
- Born: 13 November 2001 (age 24)

Sport
- Country: China
- Sport: Snooker
- Professional: 2022–2024
- Highest ranking: 83 (August 2023)
- Current ranking: (as of 4 October 2026)

Peng Yisong (Chinese: 彭奕淞; born 13 November 2001) is a Chinese former professional snooker player.

Peng turned professional in 2022 having earned his place through the CBSA China Tour and gained a two-year tour card for the 2022–23 and 2023–24 snooker seasons.

== Performance and rankings timeline ==
Tournament	2016/ 17	2017/ 18	2018/ 19	2019/ 20	2022/ 23	2023/ 24
Ranking	(Note: He was an amateur)				(Note: New players on the Main Tour don't have a ranking)	87
Ranking tournaments
Championship League	Non-Ranking Event				RR	RR
European Masters	A	A	A	A	LQ	1R
British Open	Tournament Not Held				LQ	LQ
English Open	A	A	A	A	LQ	LQ
Wuhan Open	Tournament Not Held					LQ
Northern Ireland Open	A	A	A	A	LQ	1R
International Championship	A	A	A	A	NH	LQ
UK Championship	A	A	A	A	LQ	LQ
Shoot Out	A	A	A	A	1R	2R
Scottish Open	A	A	A	A	LQ	LQ
World Grand Prix	DNQ	DNQ	DNQ	DNQ	DNQ	DNQ
German Masters	A	A	A	A	1R	1R
Welsh Open	A	A	A	A	1R	LQ
Players Championship	DNQ	DNQ	DNQ	DNQ	DNQ	DNQ
World Open	A	A	A	A	NH	LQ
Tour Championship	Not Held		DNQ	DNQ	DNQ	DNQ
World Championship	A	A	A	A	LQ	LQ
Former ranking tournaments
WST Classic	Tournament Not Held				1R	NH
Former non-ranking tournaments
Haining Open	2R	2R	2R	1R	Not Held	
Six-red World Championship	A	A	A	A	LQ	NH

Performance Table Legend
LQ	lost in the qualifying draw	#R	lost in the early rounds of the tournament (WR = Wildcard round, RR = Round robin)	QF	lost in the quarter-finals
SF	lost in the semi-finals	F	lost in the final	W	won the tournament
DNQ	did not qualify for the tournament	A	did not participate in the tournament	WD	withdrew from the tournament

NH / Not Held	means an event was not held.
NR / Non-Ranking Event	means an event is/was no longer a ranking event.
R / Ranking Event	means an event is/was a ranking event.
MR / Minor-Ranking Event	means an event is/was a minor-ranking event.
PA / Pro-am Event	means an event is/was a pro-am event.
