= 2022 Q School =

Snooker tournaments

Tournament information
- Dates: 16 May – 11 June 2022
- Venue: Ponds Forge International Sports Centre; Royal Bangkok Sports Club
- City: Sheffield; Bangkok
- Country: England; Thailand
- Organisation: World Snooker Tour; Billiard Sports Association of Thailand
- Format: Qualifying School
- Qualifiers: 16 via the 5 events

The 2022 Q School was a series of five snooker tournaments held at the start of the 2022–23 snooker season. An event for amateur players, it served as a qualification event for a place on the professional World Snooker Tour for the following two seasons. The events took place in May and June 2022 at the Ponds Forge International Sports Centre in Sheffield, England and also at the Royal Bangkok Sports Club in Bangkok, Thailand with a total 16 players qualifying via the five tournaments. The three events held in England were organised by the World Snooker Tour, whilst those in Thailand were organised by the Billiard Sports Association of Thailand.

== Format ==
The 2022 Q School consisted of five events, three held in the UK and two "Asia-Oceania" events held in Thailand. The three UK events had 173 entries competing for 12 places on the main tour, while the two Asia-Oceania events had 70 players competing for a further four places. The Asia-Oceania events were only open to residents of those continents. All matches were the best of seven frames.

== Event 1 ==
The first 2022 Q School event was held from 16 to 21 May 2022 at the Ponds Forge International Sports Centre in Sheffield, England. Rod Lawler, Fergal O'Brien, Andy Lee and Bai Langning qualified. The results of the four final matches are given below.

- Rod Lawler (ENG) 4–3 Brandon Sargeant (ENG)
- Fergal O'Brien (IRL) 4–1 Rory McLeod (JAM)
- Andy Lee (HKG) 4–2 Luke Simmonds (ENG)
- Bai Langning (CHN) 4–3 Sunny Akani (THA)

== Event 2 ==
The second 2022 Q School event was held from 22 to 27 May 2022 at the Ponds Forge International Sports Centre in Sheffield, England. Adam Duffy, Zak Surety, Aaron Hill and Sanderson Lam qualified. The results of the four final matches are given below.

- Adam Duffy (ENG) 4–3 Daniel Wells (WAL)
- Zak Surety (ENG) 4–2 Ben Mertens (BEL)
- Aaron Hill (IRL) 4–1 Zhao Jianbo (CHN)
- Sanderson Lam (ENG) 4–3 Steven Hallworth (ENG)

== Event 3 ==
The third 2022 Q School event was held from 28 May to 2 June 2022 at the Ponds Forge International Sports Centre in Sheffield, England. Lukas Kleckers, Jenson Kendrick, John Astley and James Cahill qualified. The results of the four final matches are given below.

- Lukas Kleckers (GER) 4–3 Ross Muir (SCO)
- Jenson Kendrick (ENG) 4–1 Haydon Pinhey (ENG)
- John Astley (ENG) 4–2 Michael Holt (ENG)
- James Cahill (ENG) 4–1 Zhao Jianbo (CHN)

== Asia-Oceania event 1 ==
The first 2022 Asia-Oceania Q School event was held from 1 to 5 June 2022 at the Royal Bangkok Sports Club in Bangkok, Thailand. Muhammad Asif and Thanawat Thirapongpaiboon qualified. The results of the two final matches are given below.

- Muhammad Asif (PAK) 4–2 Asjad Iqbal (PAK)
- Thanawat Thirapongpaiboon (THA) 4–2 Dechawat Poomjaeng (THA)

On 22 June 2022, the WPBSA and the World Snooker Tour declined to offer Thanawat Thirapongpaiboon a tour card, citing "serious disciplinary matters from when Thanawat was previously a professional player in 2015" as the reason, later announced to be a resumption of a previous investigation into match-fixing that had been closed due to Thanawat having fallen off the tour at the time. His place was therefore offered to Asjad Iqbal, who was the next in line on the Asia-Oceania Q School Order of Merit.

== Asia-Oceania event 2 ==
The second 2022 Asia-Oceania Q School event was held from 7 to 11 June 2022 at the Royal Bangkok Sports Club in Bangkok, Thailand. Dechawat Poomjaeng and Himanshu Jain qualified. The results of the two final matches are given below.

- Dechawat Poomjaeng (THA) 4–1 Narongdat Takantong (THA)
- Himanshu Jain (IND) 4–3 Kritsanut Lertsattayathorn (THA)

== Q School Order of Merit ==
A Q School Order of Merit was produced for players who failed to gain a place on the main tour. The Order of Merit was used to top up fields for the 2022–23 snooker season where an event failed to attract the required number of entries. The rankings in the Order of Merit were based on the number of frames won in the three UK Q School events. Players who received a bye into the second round were awarded four points for round one. Where players were equal, those who won the most frames in the first event were ranked higher and, if still equal, the player with most frames in event two. Zhao Jianbo led the Order of Merit.

In addition 48 players were seeded in the 2022–23 Q Tour UK/Europe events based on their position in the 2022 Q School Orders of Merit. These were the top 32 eligible players from the 2022 UK Q School Order of Merit, the top eight from the 2022 Asia-Oceania Q School Order of Merit, and the eight highest ranked junior players on the 2022 UK Q School Order of Merit, not already qualified.

The leading players in the UK Q School Order of Merit are given below.

Rank	Player	Event 1	Event 2	Event 3	Total
1	(China) Zhao Jianbo	17	21	21	59
2	(Scotland) Ross Muir	18	10	23	51
3	(England) Steven Hallworth	9	23	19	51
4	(Thailand) Sunny Akani	23	10	17	50
5	(Wales) Daniel Wells	10	23	15	48
6	(Austria) Florian Nüßle	19	6	19	44
7	(Pakistan) Farakh Ajaib	15	9	19	43
8	(Republic of Ireland) Ross Bulman	14	19	10	43
9	(England) Ian Martin	14	10	19	43
10	(Norway) Kurt Maflin	7	19	17	43
