= Soheil Vahedi =

Iranian snooker player (born 1989)

Personal information
- Nickname: The King of Persia
- Born: 15 March 1989 (age 37) Tehran, Iran

Sport
- Country: Iran
- Sport: Snooker
- Professional: 2017–2021
- Highest ranking: 80 (August 2020)
- Best ranking finish: Last 16 (x3)
Medal record
Representing Iran
Mixed snooker
World Games
| Bronze medal – third place | 2017 Wrocław | Individual |
Men's snooker
Asian Indoor and Martial Arts Games
| Gold medal – first place | 2017 Ashgabat | Team |
| Silver medal – second place | 2017 Ashgabat | Six-red singles |
| Bronze medal – third place | 2017 Ashgabat | Singles |

Soheil Vahedi (Persian: سهیل واحدی, born March 15, 1989) is an Iranian former professional snooker player.

== Career ==
In 2009 Vahedi entered the World Amateur Under-21 Snooker Championships in his home country in Kish, Iran in which he reached the final, before he lost 9–8 Noppon Saengkham. Seven years following his disappointment in Kish, Vahedi made it to the final of the World Amateur Snooker Championship where he defeated Andrew Pagett 8–1 to win the 2016 IBSF World Snooker Championship, as a result he was offered a two-year card on the professional World Snooker Tour for the 2017–18 and 2018–19 seasons. Vahedi came through the first event of the 2019 Q School by winning five matches to earn a two-year card on the World Snooker Tour for the 2019–20 and 2020–21 seasons.

== Performance and rankings timeline ==
| Tournament | 2015/ 16 | 2017/ 18 | 2018/ 19 | 2019/ 20 | 2020/ 21 | 2021/ 22 |
|---|---|---|---|---|---|---|
| Ranking (Note: It shows the ranking at the beginning of the season) | (Note: He was an amateur) | (Note: New players on the Main Tour don't have a ranking) | 86 | (Note: Players qualified through Q School started the season without ranking points) | 80 | |
Ranking tournaments
| Championship League | Non-Ranking Event | | | | RR | RR |
| British Open | Tournament Not Held | | | | | 1R |
| Northern Ireland Open | NH | 1R | 1R | 2R | 1R | LQ |
| English Open | NH | 1R | 1R | 1R | 1R | 1R |
| UK Championship | A | 1R | 1R | 1R | 1R | 1R |
| Scottish Open | NH | 1R | 2R | 1R | 1R | LQ |
| World Grand Prix | DNQ | DNQ | DNQ | DNQ | DNQ | DNQ |
| Shoot Out | NR | 1R | A | 3R | 1R | WD |
| German Masters | A | LQ | LQ | LQ | LQ | LQ |
| Players Championship (Note: The event was called the Players Tour Championship Grand Final (2015/2016)) | DNQ | DNQ | DNQ | DNQ | DNQ | DNQ |
| European Masters | NH | WD | LQ | LQ | 1R | 1R |
| Welsh Open | A | 2R | 2R | 4R | 1R | 1R |
| Turkish Masters | Tournament Not Held | | | | | LQ |
| Gibraltar Open | MR | 3R | 1R | 2R | 4R | 4R |
| Tour Championship | Not Held | | DNQ | DNQ | DNQ | DNQ |
| World Championship | A | LQ | LQ | LQ | LQ | LQ |
Former ranking tournaments
| Shanghai Masters | A | 1R | Non-Ranking | | Not Held | |
| Indian Open | NH | 1R | 2R | Tournament Not Held | | |
| China Open | A | LQ | LQ | Tournament Not Held | | |
| Riga Masters (Note: The event was called the Riga Open (2015/2016)) | MR | LQ | LQ | WD | Not Held | |
| International Championship | A | LQ | LQ | LQ | Not Held | |
| China Championship | NH | LQ | LQ | LQ | Not Held | |
| World Open | NH | LQ | LQ | LQ | Not Held | |
| WST Pro Series | Tournament Not Held | | | | RR | NH |
Former non-ranking tournaments
| Six-red World Championship | RR | RR | A | A | Not Held | |

Performance Table Legend
| LQ | lost in the qualifying draw | #R | lost in the early rounds of the tournament (WR = Wildcard round, RR = Round robin) | QF | lost in the quarter-finals |
| SF | lost in the semi-finals | F | lost in the final | W | won the tournament |
| DNQ | did not qualify for the tournament | A | did not participate in the tournament | WD | withdrew from the tournament |

| NH / Not Held | event was not held |
| NR / Non-Ranking Event | event is/was no longer a ranking event |
| R / Ranking Event | event is/was a ranking event |
| MR / Minor-Ranking Event | event is/was a minor-ranking event |

== Career finals ==
=== Pro-am finals: 1 ===
| Outcome | No. | Year | Championship | Opponent in the final | Score |
|---|---|---|---|---|---|
| Runner-up | 1. | 2017 | Asian Indoor and Martial Arts Games (6-red) | (China) Yan Bingtao | 1–5 |

=== Amateur finals: 3 (2 titles) ===
| Outcome | No. | Year | Championship | Opponent in the final | Score |
|---|---|---|---|---|---|
| Runner-up | 1. | 2009 | World Amateur Under-21 Championship | (Thailand) Noppon Saengkham | 8–9 |
| Winner | 1. | 2015 | Asian 6-Reds Championship | (Iran) Ehsan Heydari Nezhad | 7–4 |
| Winner | 2. | 2016 | World Amateur Championship | (Wales) Andrew Pagett | 8–1 |
