= Babar Masih =

Rawalpindi-based Pakistani snooker player

Personal information
- Born: 6 November 1986 (age 39) Rawalpindi, Pakistan

Sport
- Country: Pakistan
- Sport: Snooker

Babar Masih is a Rawalpindi-based Pakistani amateur snooker player who represents Pakistan in different international tournaments.

Masih is one of Pakistan's top-ranked amateur cueists. He belongs to a Christian family.

In August 2017, Masih and Muhammad Asif representing Pakistan-2 defeated Muhammad Sajjad and Asjad representing Pakistan-1 to win the IBSF World 6-Red Team Championship.

In August 2018, Masih was the runner-up in the 10th National Bank of Pakistan (NBP) ranking snooker championship losing 8–6 to Mohammad Ijaz in the final.

In September 2018, Masih won the Jubilee Insurance Ranking Snooker Championship 2018 by defeating Asif Toba 8–5 in the best of 15-frame final. Later in September, Masih along with Muhammad Asif won the Asian Team Snooker Championship held in Doha, Qatar, by defeating India's Pankaj Advani and Malkeet Singh 3–2 in the final.

== Performance and rankings timeline ==
Tournament	2016/ 17
Ranking (Note: It shows the ranking at the beginning of the season)	(Note: He was an amateur)
Non-ranking tournaments
Six-red World Championship	RR

Performance Table Legend
LQ	lost in the qualifying draw	#R	lost in the early rounds of the tournament (WR = Wildcard round, RR = Round robin)	QF	lost in the quarter-finals
SF	lost in the semi-finals	F	lost in the final	W	won the tournament
DNQ	did not qualify for the tournament	A	did not participate in the tournament	WD	withdrew from the tournament

NH / Not Held	event was not held
NR / Non-Ranking Event	event is/was no longer a ranking event
R / Ranking Event	event is/was a ranking event
MR / Minor-Ranking Event	event is/was a minor-ranking event

== Career finals ==
=== Team finals: 2 (2 titles) ===
Outcome	No.	Year	Championship	Team/Partner	Opponent(s) in the final	Score
Winner	1.	2017	IBSF Team Snooker Championships	Pakistan 2 Muhammad Asif	Pakistan 1 Muhammad Sajjad; Asjad Iqbal	5–4
Winner	2.	2018	ACBS Team Snooker Championships	Pakistan 1 Muhammad Asif	India 1 Pankaj Advani; Malkeet Singh	3–2

=== Amateur finals: 1 ===
Outcome	No.	Year	Championship	Opponent in the final	Score
Runner-up	1.	2021	IBSF World 6-Reds Snooker Championship	(India) Pankaj Advani	5–7
