= Ben Mertens =

Belgian snooker player

Personal information
- Born: 13 October 2004 (age 22) Wetteren, Belgium

Sport
- Country: Belgium
- Sport: Snooker
- Professional: 2022–present
- Highest ranking: 57 (26 October 2026)
- Current ranking: 62 (as of 7 November 2026)
- Best ranking finish: Last 8 (2025 Championship League, 2025 Snooker Shoot Out)

Ben Mertens (born 13 October 2004) is a Belgian professional snooker player. He won the World Open Under-16 Snooker Championships in 2018.

== Career ==
Ben Mertens is from Wetteren. When he was 12 years old, he reached the 2nd round of the 2017 EBSA European Under-18 Snooker Championship. At the 2018 event he got to the quarter-finals, where he lost to the later champion Jackson Page.

He won the Belgian U18 championship in 2018. In August 2018 he played in a professional ranking tournament for the first time, and beat Adam Stefanow in the first round of the 2018 Paul Hunter Classic.

In October 2018, when he was thirteen years old, he won the World Open Under-16 Snooker Championships, becoming the first male Belgian snooker world champion (Wendy Jans is a multiple winner of the senior women's world championship).

In January 2019, he defeated Michael White, then ranked #36 in the world, at a snooker tournament in Bruges.

At the 2019 Snooker Shoot-Out, a ranking tournament for which he got a wild card, he beat James Wattana in the first round.

In March 2020 he lost in the semi-finals of the EBSA European Under-21 Snooker Championships to later champion Aaron Hill.

In July 2020 he defeated James Cahill in the first round of the World Championship qualifiers, becoming the youngest player ever to win a match in the World Championships. This record was broken by Liam Davies, who was two days younger than Mertens when he won his first match at the 2022 World Snooker Championship qualifiers.

In June 2022 turned professional after winning the EBSA European Under-21 Snooker Championships and gained a two-year tour card for the 2022–23 and 2023–24 snooker seasons.

== Performance and rankings timeline ==
Tournament	2017/ 18	2018/ 19	2019/ 20	2020/ 21	2021/ 22	2022/ 23	2023/ 24	2024/ 25	2025/ 26	2026/ 27
Ranking (Note: It shows the ranking at the beginning of the season)	(Note: He was an amateur)					(Note: New players on the Main Tour don't have a ranking)	72	(Note: Players qualified One Year Ranking List started the season without ranking points)	72	62
Ranking tournaments
Championship League	Non-Ranking Event			A	A	RR	RR	RR	3R	RR
China Open	A	A	Tournament Not Held							LQ
Wuhan Open	Tournament Not Held						2R	LQ	1R	LQ
British Open	Tournament Not Held				A	1R	1R	2R	3R	1R
English Open	A	A	A	A	A	LQ	LQ	LQ	LQ	LQ
Shenzhen Open (Note: The event was called the Xi'an Grand Prix (2024/2025–2025/2026))	Tournament Not Held							1R	LQ	1R
Northern Ireland Open	A	A	A	A	A	LQ	LQ	LQ	LQ	1R
International Championship	A	A	A	Tournament Not Held			LQ	1R	1R	LQ
UK Championship	A	A	A	A	A	LQ	LQ	LQ	LQ	
Shoot Out	A	2R	A	2R	A	2R	1R	1R	QF	
Scottish Open	A	A	A	A	A	LQ	1R	LQ	2R	LQ
German Masters	A	LQ	A	A	A	LQ	1R	LQ	LQ	LQ
Welsh Open	A	A	A	A	A	3R	1R	1R	1R	
World Grand Prix	DNQ	DNQ	DNQ	DNQ	DNQ	DNQ	DNQ	DNQ	DNQ	
Players Championship	DNQ	DNQ	DNQ	DNQ	DNQ	DNQ	DNQ	DNQ	DNQ	
World Open	A	A	A	Tournament Not Held			LQ	LQ	LQ	
Tour Championship	NH	DNQ	DNQ	DNQ	DNQ	DNQ	DNQ	DNQ	DNQ	
World Championship	A	A	LQ	LQ	LQ	LQ	LQ	LQ	LQ	
Former ranking tournaments
Paul Hunter Classic	LQ	2R	NR	Tournament Not Held						
WST Classic	Tournament Not Held					2R	Tournament Not Held			
European Masters	A	A	A	1R	A	LQ	2R	Not Held		
Saudi Arabia Masters	Tournament Not Held							3R	3R	NH
Former non-ranking tournaments
Paul Hunter Classic	Ranking		1R	Tournament Not Held						
Six-red World Championship	A	A	A	Not Held		LQ	Tournament Not Held			

Performance Table Legend
LQ	lost in the qualifying draw	#R	lost in the early rounds of the tournament (WR = Wildcard round, RR = Round robin)	QF	lost in the quarter-finals
SF	lost in the semi-finals	F	lost in the final	W	won the tournament
DNQ	did not qualify for the tournament	A	did not participate in the tournament	WD	withdrew from the tournament

NH / Not Held	means an event was not held.
NR / Non-Ranking Event	means an event is/was no longer a ranking event.
R / Ranking Event	means an event is/was a ranking event.
MR / Minor-Ranking Event	means an event is/was a minor-ranking event.

== Career finals ==
=== Amateur finals: 4 (3 titles) ===
Outcome	No.	Year	Championship	Opponent in the final	Score
Winner	1.	2018	World Open Under-16 Snooker Championships	(Republic of Ireland) Aaron Hill	4–3
Winner	2.	2021	EBSA European Under-18 Snooker Championships	(Belgium) Julien Leclercq	4–3
Winner	3.	2022	EBSA European Under-21 Snooker Championships	(Austria) Florian Nüßle	5–1
Runner-up	1.	2022	EBSA European Snooker Championships	(Estonia) Andres Petrov	3–5
