= Himanshu Jain =

Personal information
- Born: 6 September 1991 (age 35) Telangana, India

Sport
- Country: India
- Sport: Snooker
- Professional: 2022–2024
- Highest ranking: 93 (June 2023)
- Best ranking finish: Last 64 (2022 Scottish Open)

Himanshu Dinesh Jain (born 6 September 1991) is an Indian former professional snooker player.

Jain turned professional as one of the two qualifiers from the second Asia & Oceania event of the 2022 Q School, earning a two-year tour card for the 2022–23 and 2023–24 snooker seasons. He became the fifth Indian to make an entry into the professional circuit and the first to do so via qualification rather than their Asian or World Championship ranking.

== Performance and rankings timeline ==
| Tournament | 2018/ 19 | 2022/ 23 | 2023/ 24 |
|---|---|---|---|
| Ranking | (Note: He was an amateur) | (Note: New players on the Main Tour don't have a ranking) | 93 |
Ranking tournaments
| Championship League | NR | RR | RR |
| European Masters | A | WD | LQ |
| British Open | NH | LQ | LQ |
| English Open | A | LQ | LQ |
| Wuhan Open | Not Held | | LQ |
| Northern Ireland Open | A | LQ | LQ |
| International Championship | A | NH | LQ |
| UK Championship | A | LQ | A |
| Shoot Out | A | 1R | 1R |
| Scottish Open | A | 1R | LQ |
| World Grand Prix | DNQ | DNQ | DNQ |
| German Masters | A | LQ | LQ |
| Welsh Open | A | LQ | LQ |
| Players Championship | DNQ | DNQ | DNQ |
| World Open | A | NH | LQ |
| Tour Championship | DNQ | DNQ | DNQ |
| World Championship | A | LQ | LQ |
Former ranking tournaments
| Indian Open | LQ | Not Held | |
| WST Classic | NH | 1R | NH |
Former non-ranking tournaments
| Six-red World Championship | A | LQ | NH |

Performance Table Legend
| LQ | lost in the qualifying draw | #R | lost in the early rounds of the tournament (WR = Wildcard round, RR = Round robin) | QF | lost in the quarter-finals |
| SF | lost in the semi-finals | F | lost in the final | W | won the tournament |
| DNQ | did not qualify for the tournament | A | did not participate in the tournament | WD | withdrew from the tournament |

| NH / Not Held | means an event was not held. |
| NR / Non-Ranking Event | means an event is/was no longer a ranking event. |
| R / Ranking Event | means an event is/was a ranking event. |
| MR / Minor-Ranking Event | means an event is/was a minor-ranking event. |
| PA / Pro-am Event | means an event is/was a pro-am event. |
