= Muhammad Asif (snooker player) =

Pakistani snooker player

Personal information
- Born: 17 March 1982 (age 44) Faisalabad, Pakistan

Sport
- Country: Pakistan
- Sport: Snooker
- Professional: 2022–2024
- Highest ranking: 82 (June 2023)
- Best ranking finish: Last 32 (2023 English Open)

Muhammad Asif (Urdu: محمد آصف, born 17 March 1982) is a Pakistani former professional snooker player. He is a three-time winner of the amateur IBSF World Snooker Championship. He turned professional in 2022.

== Career ==
In December 2012, Asif won the IBSF World Snooker Championship held in Sofia, Bulgaria, by defeating England's Gary Wilson 10–8.

In August 2017, Asif and Babar Masih representing Pakistan-2 defeated Muhammad Sajjad and Asjad Iqbal representing Pakistan-1 to win the IBSF World 6-Red Team Championship.

In September 2018, Asif along with Babar Masih won the Asian Team Snooker Championship held in Doha, Qatar, by defeating India's Pankaj Advani and Malkeet Singh 3–2 in the final.

In November 2019, Asif defeated Jeffrey Roda of the Philippines 8–5 in Antalya, Turkey to win his second IBSF World Snooker Championship title. He returned to a hero's welcome in Karachi.

Asif earned a two-year card on the World Snooker Tour by qualifying through the first event of the Asia-Oceania 2022 Q School, beating Asjad Iqbal.

In 2023, in the British Open's qualifying round, Asif defeated seven-time world champion Stephen Hendry 4-2.

In November 2024, Asif won the IBSF World Snooker Championship held in Doha, Qatar, with a 5-3 win over Iran's Ali Gharahgozlou.

Asif won the IBSF Masters Snooker Championship in July 2025, this time at the Crowne Plaza, Bahrain. He defeated India's Brijesh Damani 4-3 to clinch the title.

== Performance and rankings timeline ==
| Tournament | 2013/ 14 | 2014/ 15 | 2015/ 16 | 2022/ 23 | 2023/ 24 |
|---|---|---|---|---|---|
| Ranking (Note: It shows the ranking at the beginning of the season) | (Note: He was an amateur) | | | (Note: New players on the Main Tour do not have a ranking) | 82 |
Ranking tournaments
| Championship League | Non-Ranking | | | A | RR |
| European Masters | Not Held | | | A | LQ |
| British Open | Not Held | | | WD | 1R |
| English Open | Not Held | | | 1R | 2R |
| Wuhan Open | Tournament Not Held | | | | LQ |
| Northern Ireland Open | Not Held | | | WD | LQ |
| International Championship | A | A | A | NH | LQ |
| UK Championship | A | A | A | LQ | LQ |
| Shoot Out | Non-Ranking | | | 1R | 1R |
| Scottish Open | Not Held | | | LQ | LQ |
| World Grand Prix | NH | NR | DNQ | DNQ | DNQ |
| German Masters | A | A | A | LQ | LQ |
| Welsh Open | A | A | A | LQ | WD |
| Players Championship (Note: The event was called the Players Tour Championship Grand Final (2013/2014-2015/2016)) | DNQ | DNQ | DNQ | DNQ | DNQ |
| World Open | A | A | A | NH | WD |
| Tour Championship | Not Held | | | DNQ | DNQ |
| World Championship | A | A | A | LQ | WD |
Former ranking tournaments
| WST Classic | Not Held | | | 2R | NH |
Former non-ranking tournaments
| Six-red World Championship | RR | 2R | 3R | LQ | NH |

Performance Table Legend
| LQ | lost in the qualifying draw | #R | lost in the early rounds of the tournament (WR = Wildcard round, RR = Round robin) | QF | lost in the quarter-finals |
| SF | lost in the semi-finals | F | lost in the final | W | won the tournament |
| DNQ | did not qualify for the tournament | A | did not participate in the tournament | WD | withdrew from the tournament |

| NH / Not Held | event was not held |
| NR / Non-Ranking Event | event is/was no longer a ranking event |
| R / Ranking Event | event is/was a ranking event |
| MR / Minor-Ranking Event | event is/was a minor-ranking event |

== Career finals ==
=== Team finals: 4 (3 titles) ===
| Outcome | No. | Year | Championship | Team/Partner | Opponent(s) in the final | Score |
|---|---|---|---|---|---|---|
| Winner | 1. | 2013 | IBSF Team Snooker Championships | Pakistan; Muhammad Sajjad | Iran; Amir Sarkhosh; Soheil Vahedi | 5–3 |
| Runner-up | 1. | 2014 | IBSF Team Snooker Championships | Pakistan; Muhammad Sajjad | Hong Kong 1 Fung Kwok Wai; Lee Chun Wai | 3–5 |
| Winner | 2. | 2017 | IBSF Team Snooker Championships | Pakistan 2 Babar Masih | Pakistan 1 Muhammad Sajjad; Asjad Iqbal | 5–4 |
| Winner | 3. | 2018 | ACBS Team Snooker Championships | Pakistan 1 Babar Masih | India 1 Pankaj Advani; Malkeet Singh | 3–2 |

=== Amateur finals: 7 (6 titles) ===
| Outcome | No. | Year | Championship | Opponent in the final | Score |
|---|---|---|---|---|---|
| Winner | 1. | 2009 | Pakistan Amateur Championship (1) | (Pakistan) Muhammad Sajjad | 6–2 |
| Winner | 2. | 2012 | IBSF World Snooker Championship | (England) Gary Wilson | 10–8 |
| Winner | 3. | 2013 | Asian 6-Reds Championship | (Iran) Amir Sarkhosh | 7–4 |
| Winner | 4. | 2018 | Pakistan Amateur Championship (2) | (Pakistan) Mohammad Bilal | 8–5 |
| Runner-up | 5. | 2019 | IBSF World 6-Reds Snooker Championship | (India) Laxman Rawat | 5–6 |
| Winner | 6. | 2019 | IBSF World Snooker Championship (2) | (Philippines) Jefrey Roda | 8–5 |
| Winner | 7. | 2020 | Pakistan Amateur Championship (3) | (Pakistan) Shahid Aftab | 8–7 |
| Winner | 8. | 2024 | IBSF World Snooker Championship (3) | (Iran) Ali Gharahgozlou | 5–3 |
| Winner | 9. | 2025 | IBSF Masters Snooker Championship | (India) Brijesh Damani | 4–3 |

== Awards and recognition ==
- Pride of Performance award by the Government of Pakistan in 2015.
