= Ryan Thomerson =

Australian snooker player (born 1994)

Personal information
- Nickname: The Thomer-Hawk
- Born: 1 October 1994 (age 32) England

Sport
- Country: Australia
- Sport: Snooker
- Professional: 2022–2024
- Highest ranking: 89 (June 2023)
- Best ranking finish: Last 64 (x2)

Ryan Thomerson (born 1 October 1994) is an Australian former professional snooker player.

Thomerson turned professional in 2022 after winning the Asia Pacific Championship and gained a two-year tour card for the 2022–23 and 2023–24 snooker seasons.

== Performance and rankings timeline ==
Tournament	2011/ 12	2013/ 14	2016/ 17	2017/ 18	2022/ 23	2023/ 24
Ranking (Note: It shows the ranking at the beginning of the season.)	(Note: He was an amateur)				(Note: New players on the Main Tour don't have a ranking)	89
Ranking tournaments
Championship League	Non-Ranking Event				RR	RR
European Masters	Not Held		A	A	LQ	LQ
British Open	Tournament Not Held				LQ	LQ
English Open	Not Held		A	A	LQ	LQ
Wuhan Open	Tournament Not Held					LQ
Northern Ireland Open	Not Held		A	A	LQ	LQ
International Championship	NH	A	A	A	NH	LQ
UK Championship	A	A	A	A	LQ	LQ
Shoot Out	Non-Ranking		A	A	1R	1R
Scottish Open	Not Held		A	A	LQ	LQ
World Grand Prix	Not Held		DNQ	DNQ	DNQ	DNQ
German Masters	A	A	A	A	LQ	LQ
Welsh Open	A	A	A	A	1R	LQ
Players Championship (Note: The event was called the Players Tour Championship Grand Final (2011/2012, 2013/2014))	DNQ	DNQ	DNQ	DNQ	DNQ	DNQ
World Open	A	A	A	A	NH	LQ
Tour Championship	Tournament Not Held				DNQ	DNQ
World Championship	A	A	A	LQ	LQ	LQ
Former ranking tournaments
WST Classic	Tournament Not Held				1R	NH
Former non-ranking tournaments
Six-red World Championship	NH	A	RR	A	LQ	NH

Performance Table Legend
LQ	lost in the qualifying draw	#R	lost in the early rounds of the tournament (WR = Wildcard round, RR = Round robin)	QF	lost in the quarter-finals
SF	lost in the semi-finals	F	lost in the final	W	won the tournament
DNQ	did not qualify for the tournament	A	did not participate in the tournament	WD	withdrew from the tournament

NH / Not Held	means an event was not held.
NR / Non-Ranking Event	means an event is/was no longer a ranking event.
R / Ranking Event	means an event is/was a ranking event.
MR / Minor-Ranking Event	means an event is/was a minor-ranking event.

== Career finals ==
=== Amateur finals: 7 (2 titles) ===
Outcome	No.	Year	Championship	Opponent in the final	Score
Runner-up	1.	2011	Australian Under-18 Championship	(Australia) Kurt Brown	3–5
Runner-up	2.	2014	Australian Under-21 Championship	(Australia) Charlie Chafe	2–6
Runner-up	3.	2017	Oceania 6-red Championship	(Australia) Adrian Ridley	0–6
Winner	1.	2017	Australian Open Championship	(Australia) Steve Mifsud	6–3
Runner-up	4.	2021	EPSB Open Series - Event 6 (Breakers)	(England) Luke Simmonds	0–3
Winner	2.	2022	Asia Pacific Championship	(Australia) Justin Sajich	6–1
Runner-up	5.	2024	Q Tour Event 5	(China) Zhao Xintong	2–4
