= Asjad Iqbal =

Pakistani snooker player

Personal information
- Born: 15 November 1991 (age 34) Sargodha, Pakistan

Sport
- Country: Pakistan
- Sport: Snooker
- Professional: 2022–2024
- Highest ranking: 83 (June 2023)
- Best ranking finish: Last 32 (2023 Snooker Shoot Out)

Asjad Iqbal (Urdu: اسجد اقبال, born 15 November 1991 in Sargodha, Pakistan) is a Pakistani former professional snooker player. He turned professional at the start of the 2022/2023 season. Reaching the final round of the first event of Asia-Oceania Q School in 2022 he earned a two years card for the professional tour via Order of Merit.

== Career ==
=== 2022/2023 season ===
As Iqbal's tour card was only granted by Order of Merit, after Thanawat Thirapongpaiboon was finally denied the same on 1 September 2022 due to disciplinary issues, he wasn't able to take part in the first tournaments of the tour calendar. The first professional tournament he was able to attend, was the 2022 Scottish Open, but he lost in the qualification round. He secured his first win on tour against the experienced Barry Pinches at the UK Championship qualifying in November 2022.

== Performance and rankings timeline ==
Tournament	2015/ 16	2022/ 23	2023/ 24
Ranking (Note: It shows the ranking at the beginning of the season)	(Note: He was an amateur)	(Note: New players on the Main Tour don't have a ranking)	83
Ranking tournaments
Championship League	NR	A	WD
European Masters	NH	A	LQ
British Open	NH	WD	WD
English Open	NH	LQ	A
Wuhan Open	Not Held		A
Northern Ireland Open	NH	WD	A
International Championship	A	NH	A
UK Championship	A	LQ	A
Shoot Out	NR	3R	A
Scottish Open	NH	LQ	A
World Grand Prix	DNQ	DNQ	DNQ
German Masters	NH	LQ	A
Welsh Open	NH	LQ	A
Players Championship	DNQ	DNQ	DNQ
World Open	A	NH	A
Tour Championship	NH	DNQ	DNQ
World Championship	A	LQ	A
Former ranking tournaments
WST Classic	NH	1R	NH
Former non-ranking tournaments
Six-red World Championship	2R	LQ	NH

Performance Table Legend
LQ	lost in the qualifying draw	#R	lost in the early rounds of the tournament (WR = Wildcard round, RR = Round robin)	QF	lost in the quarter-finals
SF	lost in the semi-finals	F	lost in the final	W	won the tournament
DNQ	did not qualify for the tournament	A	did not participate in the tournament	WD	withdrew from the tournament

NH / Not Held	means an event was not held
NR / Non-Ranking Event	means an event is/was no longer a ranking event
R / Ranking Event	means an event is/was a ranking event
MR / Minor-Ranking Event	means an event is/was a minor-ranking event

== Career finals ==
=== Team finals: 1 ===
Outcome	No.	Year	Championship	Team/Partner	Opponent(s) in the final	Score
Runner-up	1.	2017	IBSF Team Snooker Championships	Pakistan 1 Muhammad Sajjad	Pakistan 2 Babar Masih; Muhammad Asif	4–5

=== Amateur finals: 3 ===
Outcome	No.	Year	Championship	Opponent in the final	Score
Runner-up	1.	2010	Pakistan Amateur Championship	(Pakistan) Muhammad Sajjad	2–8
Runner-up	2.	2017	Pakistan Amateur Championship	(Pakistan) Muhammad Sajjad	6–8
Runner-up	3.	2019	Pakistan Amateur Championship	(Pakistan) Mohammad Bilal	4–8
