= Wuhan Open (snooker) =

Snooker tournament

Tournament information
- Venue: Optics Valley Gymnasium, Huazhong University of Science and Technology
- Location: Wuhan
- Country: China
- Established: 2023
- Organisation(s): World Snooker Tour; CBSA
- Format: Ranking event
- Total prize fund: £825,000
- Winner's share: £175,000
- Recent edition: 2026
- Current champion: Chang Bingyu (CHN)

The Wuhan Open is a professional ranking snooker tournament held by the World Snooker Tour and the Chinese Billiards and Snooker Association (CBSA) in Wuhan, China. The reigning champion is Chang Bingyu.

== History ==
The event was introduced in the 2023–24 season. It was the first ranking snooker competition held in mainland China since the 2019 World Open, after a hiatus of tournaments in China due to the COVID-19 pandemic. The inaugural 2023 edition ran from 9 to 15 October in Wuhan, China, and was won by Judd Trump, who defeated Ali Carter 10–7 in the final.

== Winners ==
Year	Winner	Runner-up	Final score	Venue	Season
2023	Judd Trump (ENG)	Ali Carter (ENG)	10–7	Wuhan Gymnasium	2023/24
2024	Xiao Guodong (CHN)	Si Jiahui (CHN)	10–7	Optics Valley Convention & Exhibition Center	2024/25
2025	Xiao Guodong (CHN)	Gary Wilson (ENG)	10–9	Optics Valley Gymnasium, HUST	2025/26
2026	Chang Bingyu (CHN)	Zhao Xintong (CHN)	10–7	Optics Valley Gymnasium, HUST	2026/27

== Finalists ==
Name	Nationality	Winner	Runner-up	Finals
Xiao Guodong	China	2	0	2
Judd Trump	England	1	0	1
Chang Bingyu	China	1	0	1
Ali Carter	England	0	1	1
Si Jiahui	China	0	1	1
Gary Wilson	England	0	1	1
Zhao Xintong	China	0	1	1

Legend
The names of active players are marked in **bold**.
