= 2023–24 snooker season =

Series of snooker tournaments

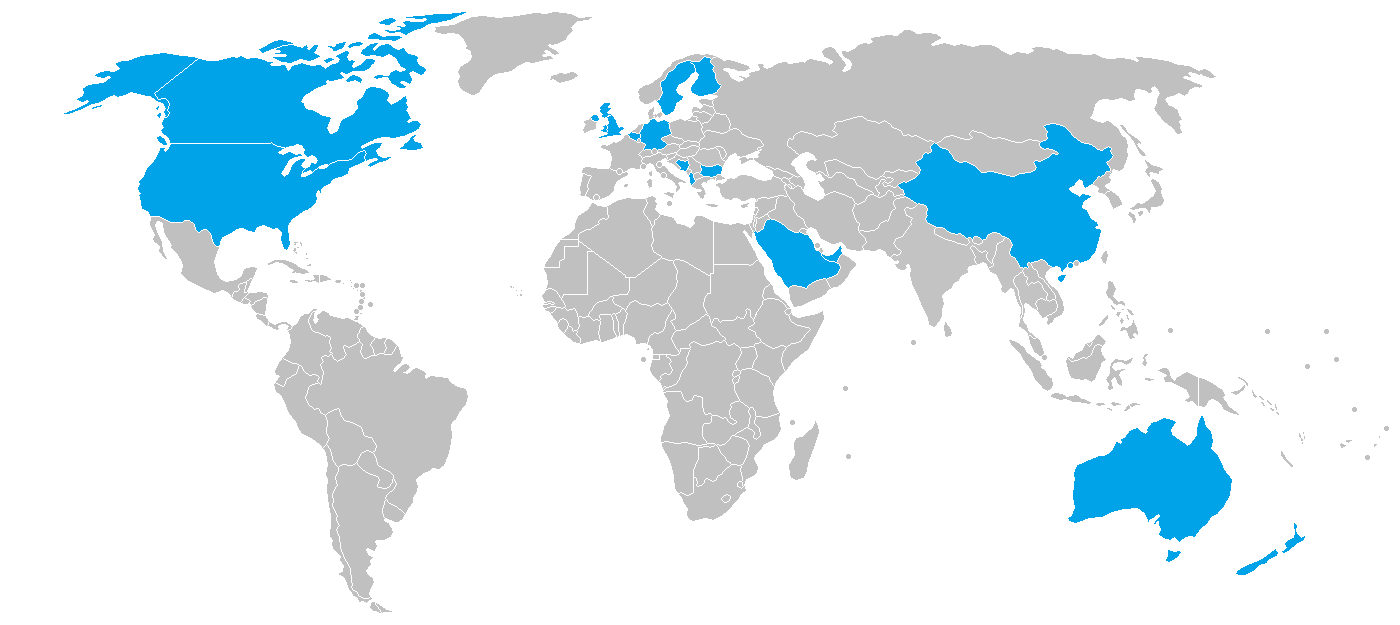
- Nations that hosted an event in the snooker calendar during the 2023–24 season

Details
- Duration: 26 June 2023 – 26 May 2024
- Tournaments: World Snooker Tour: 23 (17 ranking events); WPBSA Q Tour: 18; World Women's: 8 World Seniors: 1

Triple Crown winners
- UK Championship: Ronnie O'Sullivan (ENG)
- Masters: Ronnie O'Sullivan (ENG)
- World Championship: Kyren Wilson (ENG)

The 2023–24 snooker season was a series of snooker tournaments played from 26 June 2023 to 26 May 2024.

== Players ==
The World Snooker Tour in the 2023–24 season initially involved 130 professional players, but dropped to 129 players. The decrease in membership was due to Dechawat Poomjaeng letting his WPBSA membership lapse and thus meant he was automatically removed from the main tour.

This included 65 out of the top 68 players from the prize money rankings after the 2023 World Championship (Zhao Xintong, Yan Bingtao, and Lu Ning were banned from competition after an independent disciplinary tribunal found them guilty of match-fixing, and were not eligible to compete during the season) and 34 of the 35 players who earned a two-year card the previous year (Bai Langning was also banned from competition due to his involvement in match-fixing). The next four places went to the top four players on the one-year ranking list who had not already qualified for the tour. Seven players from international championships, two players from the Q Tour, three players from the CBSA China Tour, and two players from the World Women's Snooker Tour also received tour cards. A further eight places were assigned through the two 2023 Q School events. The finalists from both of the Asia-Oceania Q School events received tour cards. Marco Fu received an invitational tour card.

=== New professional players ===
All players listed below received a tour card for two seasons.

Top 4 players from 2022/2023 One Year Ranking List

1. Daniel Wells (WAL)
2. Jimmy White (ENG)
3. Ian Burns (ENG)
4. Hammad Miah (ENG)

International Champions

5. WSF Open Champion: Ma Hailong (CHN)
6. WSF Junior Champion: Stan Moody (ENG)
7. EBSA European Champion: Ross Muir (SCO)
8. EBSA European Under-21 Champion: Liam Graham (SCO)
9. APSBF Asia Pacific Champion: Liu Hongyu (CHN)
10. PABSA Americas Champion: Ahmed Aly Elsayed (USA)
11. ABSC African Champion: Mostafa Dorgham (EGY)

Q Tour

Main article: 2022–23 Q Tour
12. Highest Ranked: Martin O'Donnell (ENG)
13. Play Off: Ashley Carty (ENG)

CBSA China Tour

14. Jiang Jun (CHN)
15. Long Zehuang (CHN)
16. Xing Zihao (CHN)

World Women's Snooker Qualifiers

17. Women's World Champion: Baipat Siripaporn (THA)
18. Highest Ranked: Reanne Evans (ENG)

Q School

Main article: 2023 Q School

Event 1

19. Alexander Ursenbacher (SUI)
20. Andrew Higginson (ENG)
21. Liam Pullen (ENG)
22. Andrew Pagett (WAL)

Event 2

23. Dean Young (SCO)
24. Louis Heathcote (ENG)
25. Stuart Carrington (ENG)
26. Alfie Burden (ENG)

Asia-Oceania Event 1

27. Thor Chuan Leong (MAS)
28. Manasawin Phetmalaikul (THA)

Asia-Oceania Event 2

29. Ishpreet Singh Chadha (IND)
30. He Guoqiang (CHN)

Invitational Tour Card

31. Marco Fu (HKG)

== Calendar ==
The following tables outline the dates and results for all the World Snooker Tour, World Women's Snooker Tour, World Seniors Tour, Q Tour, and other events in the season.

=== World Snooker Tour ===
Start	Finish	Tournament	Venue	Winner	Score	Runner-up	Ref.
26 Jun	21 Jul	Championship League	Leicester Arena in Leicester, England	Shaun Murphy (ENG)	3‍–‍0	Mark Williams (WAL)	
22 Aug	27 Aug	European Masters	Kia Metropol Arena in Nuremberg, Germany	Barry Hawkins (ENG)	9‍–‍6	Judd Trump (ENG)	
11 Sep	17 Sep	Shanghai Masters^{†}	Shanghai Grand Stage in Shanghai, China	Ronnie O'Sullivan (ENG)	11‍–‍9	Luca Brecel (BEL)	
25 Sep	1 Oct	British Open	The Centaur in Cheltenham, England	Mark Williams (WAL)	10‍–‍7	Mark Selby (ENG)	
2 Oct	8 Oct	English Open	Brentwood Centre in Brentwood, England	Judd Trump (ENG)	9‍–‍7	Zhang Anda (CHN)	
9 Oct	15 Oct	Wuhan Open	Wuhan Gymnasium in Wuhan, China	Judd Trump (ENG)	10‍–‍7	Ali Carter (ENG)	
22 Oct	29 Oct	Northern Ireland Open	Waterfront Hall in Belfast, Northern Ireland	Judd Trump (ENG)	9‍–‍3	Chris Wakelin (ENG)	
5 Nov	12 Nov	International Championship	Tianjin People's Stadium in Tianjin, China	Zhang Anda (CHN)	10‍–‍6	Tom Ford (ENG)	
13 Nov	19 Nov	Champion of Champions^{†}	University of Bolton Stadium in Bolton, England	Mark Allen (NIR)	10‍–‍3	Judd Trump (ENG)	
25 Nov	3 Dec	UK Championship	York Barbican in York, England	Ronnie O'Sullivan (ENG)	10‍–‍7	Ding Junhui (CHN)	
6 Dec	9 Dec	Shoot Out	Swansea Arena in Swansea, Wales	Mark Allen (NIR)	1‍–‍0	Cao Yupeng (CHN)	
11 Dec	17 Dec	Scottish Open	Meadowbank Sports Centre in Edinburgh, Scotland	Gary Wilson (ENG)	9‍–‍5	Noppon Saengkham (THA)	
7 Jan	14 Jan	Masters^{†}	Alexandra Palace in London, England	Ronnie O'Sullivan (ENG)	10‍–‍7	Ali Carter (ENG)	
15 Jan	21 Jan	World Grand Prix	Leicester Arena in Leicester, England	Ronnie O'Sullivan (ENG)	10‍–‍7	Judd Trump (ENG)	
29 Jan	4 Feb	German Masters	Tempodrom in Berlin, Germany	Judd Trump (ENG)	10‍–‍5	Si Jiahui (CHN)	
12 Feb	18 Feb	Welsh Open	Venue Cymru in Llandudno, Wales	Gary Wilson (ENG)	9‍–‍4	Martin O'Donnell (ENG)	
19 Feb	25 Feb	Players Championship	Telford International Centre in Telford, England	Mark Allen (NIR)	10‍–‍8	Zhang Anda (CHN)	
4 Mar	6 Mar	World Masters of Snooker^{†}	Global Theatre in Riyadh, Saudi Arabia	Ronnie O'Sullivan (ENG)	5‍–‍2	Luca Brecel (BEL)	
2 Jan	13 Mar	Championship League Invitational^{†}	Leicester Arena in Leicester, England	Mark Selby (ENG)	3‍–‍1	Joe O'Connor (ENG)	
18 Mar	24 Mar	World Open	Yushan Sport Centre in Yushan, China	Judd Trump (ENG)	10‍–‍4	Ding Junhui (CHN)	
30 Mar	31 Mar	World Mixed Doubles^{†}	Manchester Central in Manchester, England	Luca Brecel (BEL); Reanne Evans (ENG)	4‍–‍2	Mark Selby (ENG); Rebecca Kenna (ENG)	
1 Apr	7 Apr	Tour Championship	Manchester Central in Manchester, England	Mark Williams (WAL)	10‍–‍5	Ronnie O'Sullivan (ENG)	
20 Apr	6 May	World Championship	Crucible Theatre in Sheffield, England	Kyren Wilson (ENG)	18‍–‍14	Jak Jones (WAL)	

Ranking event
^{†} Non-ranking event

European Series champion and Betvictor bonus winner: Judd Trump (ENG)

=== World Women's Snooker Tour ===
Start	Finish	Tournament	Venue	Winner	Score	Runner-up	Ref.
11 Aug	13 Aug	US Women's Open	OX Billiards in Seattle, Washington, United States	Mink Nutcharut (THA)	4‍–‍2	Ng On-yee (HKG)	
22 Sep	24 Sep	UK Women's Championship	Northern Snooker Centre in Leeds, England	Reanne Evans (ENG)	4‍–‍1	Bai Yulu (CHN)	
7 Oct	10 Oct	Australian Women's Open	Mounties in Sydney, Australia	Ng On-yee (HKG)	4‍–‍1	Amee Kamani (IND)	
17 Nov	19 Nov	Women's Masters	Frames Sports Bar in London, England	Mary Talbot-Deegan (ENG)	4‍–‍3	Jamie Hunter (ENG)	
19 Jan	21 Jan	Belgian Women's Open	The Trickshot in Bruges, Belgium	Mink Nutcharut (THA)	4‍–‍2	Ng On-yee (HKG)	
29 Jan	2 Feb	Albanian Women's Open	Grand Blue Fafa Resort in Golem, Albania	Ng On-yee (HKG)	4‍–‍3	Mink Nutcharut (THA)	
11 Mar	17 Mar	World Women's Championship	Changping Gymnasium in Dongguan, China	Bai Yulu (CHN)	6‍–‍5	Mink Nutcharut (THA)	
24 May	26 May	British Women's Open	Landywood Snooker Club in Great Wyrley, England	Ng On-yee (HKG)	4‍–‍1	Mink Nutcharut (THA)	

=== World Seniors Tour ===
Start	Finish	Tournament	Venue	Winner	Score	Runner-up	Ref.
8 May	12 May	World Seniors Championship	Crucible Theatre in Sheffield, England	Igor Figueiredo (BRA)	5‍–‍2	Ken Doherty (IRL)	

=== Q Tour ===
Start	Finish	Tournament	Venue	Winner	Score	Runner-up	Ref.
25 Aug	27 Aug	Q Tour UK/Europe 1	North East Snooker Centre in North Shields, England	Liam Davies (WAL)	5‍–‍2	Craig Steadman (ENG)	
15 Sep	17 Sep	Q Tour UK/Europe 2	Snookerhallen in Stockholm, Sweden	Michael Holt (ENG)	5‍–‍2	Liam Davies (WAL)	
28 Sep	1 Oct	Q Tour Asia Pacific 1	Cuthberts Green in Christchurch, New Zealand	Rob Redgrove (NZL)	5‍–‍4	Adam Shaw (NZL)	
12 Oct	15 Oct	Q Tour Asia Pacific 2	Mt Pritchard & District Community Club in Sydney, Australia	Vinnie Calabrese (AUS)	6‍–‍3	Steve Mifsud (AUS)	
20 Oct	22 Oct	Q Tour UK/Europe 3	Billardzentrum am Pfühlpark in Heilbronn, Germany	Umut Dikme (GER)	5‍–‍1	Hamim Hussain (ENG)	
10 Nov	12 Nov	Q Tour UK/Europe 4	Landywood Snooker Club in Great Wyrley, England	Antoni Kowalski (POL)	5‍–‍3	Rory McLeod (JAM)	
15 Dec	17 Dec	Q Tour UK/Europe 5	Castle Snooker Club in Brighton, England	Michael Holt (ENG)	5‍–‍1	Daniel Womersley (ENG)	
5 Jan	7 Jan	Q Tour UK/Europe 6	National Snooker Academy in Sofia, Bulgaria	Michael Holt (ENG)	5‍–‍4	Alfie Davies (WAL)	
4 Jan	9 Jan	Q Tour Middle East 1	Cue Sports Academy in Abu Dhabi, United Arab Emirates	Amir Sarkhosh (IRN)	4‍–‍0	Habib Subah Humood (BHR)	
11 Jan	17 Jan	Q Tour Middle East 2	Cue Sports Academy in Abu Dhabi, United Arab Emirates	Amir Sarkhosh (IRN)	4‍–‍3	Mohammed Shehab (UAE)	
19 Jan	21 Jan	Q Tour Americas 1	The Corner Bank in Toronto, Canada	Vito Puopolo (CAN)	5‍–‍1	Jason Williams (CAN)	
18 Jan	24 Jan	Q Tour Middle East 3	Cue Sports Academy in Abu Dhabi, United Arab Emirates	Mohammed Shehab (UAE)	4‍–‍0	Yazan Alhaddad (SYR)	
25 Jan	28 Jan	Q Tour Asia Pacific 3	Matchroom Snooker Centre in Calamvale, Australia	Vinnie Calabrese (AUS)	5‍–‍3	Adrian Law (AUS)	
16 Feb	18 Feb	Q Tour UK/Europe 7	Northern Snooker Centre in Leeds, England	Peter Lines (ENG)	5–1	Umut Dikme (GER)	
22 Feb	25 Feb	Q Tour Americas 2	PABSA Academy in San Jose, California, United States	Hasanain Khalid Alsultani (USA)	5–4	Sargon Isaac (USA)	
13 Mar	15 Mar	Q Tour Global Playoff	Hotel Hills in Sarajevo, Bosnia and Herzegovina	Duane Jones (WAL)	10–9	Liam Davies (WAL)	
13 Mar	15 Mar	Q Tour Global Playoff	Hotel Hills in Sarajevo, Bosnia and Herzegovina	Amir Sarkhosh (IRN)	10–8	Iulian Boiko (UKR)	
13 Mar	15 Mar	Q Tour Global Playoff	Hotel Hills in Sarajevo, Bosnia and Herzegovina	Mohammed Shehab (UAE)	10–8	Chang Yu Kiu (HKG)	

=== Other events ===
Start	Finish	Tournament	Venue	Winner	Score	Runner-up	Ref.
1 Aug	5 Aug	Huangguoshu Open	Huangguoshu Tourism Area in Anshun, China	Judd Trump (ENG)	5‍–‍1	John Higgins (SCO)	
22 Dec	24 Dec	Macau Masters – Event 1	Studio City in Cotai, Macau	Mark Selby (ENG)	6–3	Ali Carter (ENG)	
26 Dec	29 Dec	Macau Masters – Event 2	Wynn Palace in Cotai, Macau	Mark Williams (WAL)	9–6	Jack Lisowski (ENG)	
9 May	12 May	Vienna Open	15 Reds Köö Club in Vienna, Austria	Alexander Ursenbacher (SUI)	5–4	Craig Steadman (ENG)	
25 May	26 May	Helsinki International Cup	Kulttuuritalo in Helsinki, Finland	Ali Carter (ENG)	6–3	Kyren Wilson (ENG)	

== World ranking points ==
The ranking points for reaching different stages of each ranking tournament are listed below.

Round Tournament	R144	R128	R112	R96	R80	R64	R48	R32	R24	R16	R12	QF	R6	SF	F	W
Championship League	—N/a	0 (Note: First stage fourth-placed)	—N/a	1,000 (Note: First stage third-placed)	—N/a	2,000 (Note: First stage runner-up)	—N/a	4,000 (Note: Second stage fourth-placed)	5,000 (Note: Second stage third-placed)	6,000 (Note: Second stage runner-up)	—N/a	8,000 (Note: Third stage fourth-placed)	9,000 (Note: Third stage third-placed)	11,000 (Note: Third stage runner-up)	23,000	33,000
European Masters	—N/a	0	—N/a	—N/a	—N/a	3,000	—N/a	4,500	—N/a	7,500	—N/a	11,000	—N/a	17,500	35,000	80,000
British Open	—N/a	0	—N/a	—N/a	—N/a	3,000	—N/a	5,000	—N/a	8,000	—N/a	12,000	—N/a	20,000	45,000	100,000
English Open	—N/a	0	—N/a	—N/a	—N/a	3,000	—N/a	4,500	—N/a	7,500	—N/a	11,000	—N/a	17,500	35,000	80,000
Wuhan Open	—N/a	0	—N/a	—N/a	—N/a	4,500	—N/a	8,000	—N/a	12,000	—N/a	16,000	—N/a	30,000	63,000	140,000
Northern Ireland Open	—N/a	0	—N/a	—N/a	—N/a	3,000	—N/a	4,500	—N/a	7,500	—N/a	11,000	—N/a	17,500	35,000	80,000
International Championship	—N/a	0	—N/a	—N/a	—N/a	5,000	—N/a	9,000	—N/a	14,000	—N/a	22,000	—N/a	33,000	75,000	175,000
UK Championship	0	—N/a	2,500 (Note: Players who lose their first match receive no ranking points.)	—N/a	5,000	—N/a	7,500	10,000	—N/a	15,000	—N/a	25,000	—N/a	50,000	100,000	250,000
Shoot Out	—N/a	0	—N/a	—N/a	—N/a	500	—N/a	1,000	—N/a	2,000	—N/a	4,000	—N/a	8,000	20,000	50,000
Scottish Open	—N/a	0	—N/a	—N/a	—N/a	3,000	—N/a	4,500	—N/a	7,500	—N/a	11,000	—N/a	17,500	35,000	80,000
World Grand Prix	—N/a	—N/a	—N/a	—N/a	—N/a	—N/a	—N/a	5,000	—N/a	7,500	—N/a	12,500	—N/a	20,000	40,000	100,000
German Masters	—N/a	0	—N/a	—N/a	—N/a	3,000	—N/a	4,500	—N/a	7,500	—N/a	11,000	—N/a	17,500	35,000	80,000
Welsh Open	—N/a	0	—N/a	—N/a	—N/a	3,000	—N/a	4,500	—N/a	7,500	—N/a	11,000	—N/a	17,500	35,000	80,000
Players Championship	—N/a	—N/a	—N/a	—N/a	—N/a	—N/a	—N/a	—N/a	—N/a	10,000	—N/a	15,000	—N/a	30,000	50,000	125,000
World Open	—N/a	0	—N/a	—N/a	—N/a	5,000	—N/a	9,000	—N/a	14,000	—N/a	21,500	—N/a	32,500	73,000	170,000
Tour Championship	—N/a	—N/a	—N/a	—N/a	—N/a	—N/a	—N/a	—N/a	—N/a	—N/a	20,000	30,000	—N/a	40,000	60,000	150,000
World Championship	0	—N/a	5,000	—N/a	10,000	—N/a	15,000	20,000	—N/a	30,000	—N/a	50,000	—N/a	100,000	200,000	500,000
