= OBSF Oceanian Snooker Championship =

Tournament information
- Country: Oceania
- Established: 1994
- Organisation(s): Oceania Billiards & Snooker Federation (OBSF)
- Format: Amateur event

The OBSF Oceanian Snooker Championship (also known as the Oceania Snooker Championship) is the amateur snooker tournament in Oceania.

== History ==
It has been held since 1994 and is organised by the Oceania Billiards & Snooker Federation (OBSF).

The tournament features players from Australia, New Zealand and other Pacific nations. In recent years, the winner has typically received a nomination for a place on the professional main tour, although not all champions have taken up the opportunity.

The championship usually includes multiple categories such as men's, women's and junior events, with the men's competition being the main event.

== Finals and winners ==
Year	Venue	Winner	Runner-up	Score
1994	Pukekohe, New Zealand	(New Zealand) Steve Robertson	(Australia) Les Higgins	5–2
1995	Gosford, Australia	(Australia) Les Higgins	(Australia) Stuart Lawler	6–4
1996	Taupo, New Zealand	(New Zealand) Steve Robertson	(Australia) Shawn Budd	5–4
1997	Papua New Guinea	(Australia) Shawn Budd	(Australia) Craig Duffy	6–3
1998	Melbourne, Australia	(Australia) Steve Mifsud	(Australia) Shawn Budd	8–5
1999	?	?	?	?
2000	Auckland, New Zealand	(Australia) Neil Robertson	(Australia) Robby Foldvari	8–1
2001	Sydney, Australia	(Australia) Johl Younger	(Australia) Glen Wilkinson	5–3
2002	Australia	(Australia) Ian Barber	(Australia) Alastair Davidson	3–1
2003	?	(Australia) Aaron Mahoney	(Australia) John Younger	
2004	?	(Australia) Shawn Budd	(Australia) Aaron Mahoney	
2005	?	(New Zealand) Dene O'Kane	(Australia) Glen Wilkinson	
2006	Auckland, New Zealand	(New Zealand) Dene O'Kane	(Australia) Aaron Mahoney	6–5
2007	Queensland, Australia	(New Zealand) Dene O'Kane	(New Zealand) Daniel Haenga	6–5
2008	New South Wales, Australia	(Australia) Glen Wilkinson	(New Zealand) Chris McBreen	6–4
2009	Port Moresby, Papua New Guinea	(Australia) Glen Wilkinson	(Australia) Daniel Thorp	6–1
2010	Mt Pritchard, Australia	(Australia) Shawn Budd	(Australia) Glen Wilkinson	6–2
2011	Auckland, New Zealand	(Australia) Joe Minici	(Australia) Steve Mifsud	6–4
2012	Carnegie, Australia	(Australia) Ben Judge	(Australia) James Mifsud	6–2
2013	Port Moresby, Papua New Guinea	(Australia) Vinnie Calabrese	(Australia) Matthew Bolton	6–5
2014	Albury, Australia	(Australia) Steve Mifsud	(Australia) Charlie Chafe	6–2
2015	Auckland, New Zealand	(Australia) Vinnie Calabrese	(Australia) Matthew Bolton	6–3
2016	Mt Pritchard, Australia	(Australia) Kurt Dunham	(Australia) James Mifsud	6–5
2017	Albury, Australia	(Australia) Matthew Bolton	(Australia) Ben Judge	6–3
2018	Mt Pritchard, Australia	(Australia) Adrian Ridley	(Australia) Dennis Paul	6–4
2019	Mt Pritchard, Australia	(Australia) Steve Mifsud	(Australia) Kurt Dunham	6–4
2020	Mt Pritchard, Australia	(Australia) Cale Barrett	(Australia) Shaun Dalitz	6–1
