= 2023 Wuhan Open (snooker) =

Snooker tournament

2023 Panda Club Wuhan Open

Tournament information
- Dates: 9–15 October 2023
- Venue: Wuhan Gymnasium
- City: Wuhan
- Country: China
- Organisation: World Snooker Tour
- Format: Ranking event
- Total prize fund: £700,000
- Winner's share: £140,000
- Highest break: Ali Carter (ENG) (145); Aaron Hill (IRL) (145)

Final
- Champion: Judd Trump (ENG)
- Runner-up: Ali Carter (ENG)
- Score: 10–7

The 2023 Wuhan Open (officially the 2023 Panda Club Wuhan Open) was a professional snooker tournament that took place from 9 to 15 October 2023 at the Wuhan Gymnasium in Wuhan, China. The fifth ranking event of the 2023–24 season, it followed the 2023 English Open and preceded the 2023 Northern Ireland Open. The inaugural edition of the Wuhan Open, it was the second professional snooker tournament (following the invitational 2023 Shanghai Masters) and the first ranking event held in mainland China since the 2019 World Open, due to the impact of the COVID-19 pandemic. The event was broadcast domestically in China by CCTV-5 and in Europe (including the UK) by Eurosport and Discovery+. It was available from Matchroom Sport in all other territories. The winner received £140,000 from a total prize fund of £700,000.

Qualifiers took place from 1 to 5 September at the Morningside Arena in Leicester, England. Qualifying matches featuring the top two players in the world rankings (Ronnie O'Sullivan and Luca Brecel), the two highest ranked Chinese players (Ding Junhui and Zhou Yuelong), and four Chinese wildcards were held over to be played in Wuhan. The reigning world champion Brecel withdrew in advance of the tournament's main stage, as did Mark Williams, Graeme Dott, and David Gilbert.

Judd Trump won the tournament, defeating Ali Carter 10–7 in the final to secure the 25th ranking title of his career, which put him level with Williams in joint fifth place on the all-time list. Having claimed the English Open title the previous week, Trump won back-to-back ranking events for the fourth time in his career. He became the third player in snooker history to win back-to-back ranking tournaments in different countries, after Stephen Hendry in 1990 and Williams in 2002.

The qualifiers in Leicester produced 32 centuries and the main stage in Wuhan produced 69 centuries. The highest break prize was shared by Aaron Hill, who made a 145 break in his qualifying match against Joe Perry, and Carter, who made a 145 in his last-64 match against Jamie Clarke.

== Format ==
The tournament, the inaugural edition of the Wuhan Open, took place from 9 to 15 October 2023 at the Wuhan Gymnasium in Wuhan, China. It was the fifth ranking event of the 2023–24 season, following the 2023 English Open and preceding the 2023 Northern Ireland Open. it was the second professional snooker tournament, following the invitational 2023 Shanghai Masters, and the first ranking event held in mainland China since the 2019 World Open, due to the impact of the COVID-19 pandemic.

All matches up to and including the quarter-finals were best of nine frames. The semi-finals were best of 11 frames, and the final was best of 19 frames.

The event was broadcast domestically in China by CCTV-5, Migu, Youku, and Huya Live and in Europe (including the UK) by Eurosport and Discovery+. It was available from Matchroom Sport in all other territories.

=== Prize fund ===
The breakdown of prize money for this event is shown below:

- Winner: £140,000
- Runner-up: £63,000
- Semi-final: £30,000
- Quarter-final: £16,000
- Last 16: £12,000
- Last 32: £8,000
- Last 64: £4,500
- Highest break: £5,000
- Total: £700,000

== Summary ==
=== Qualifying round ===
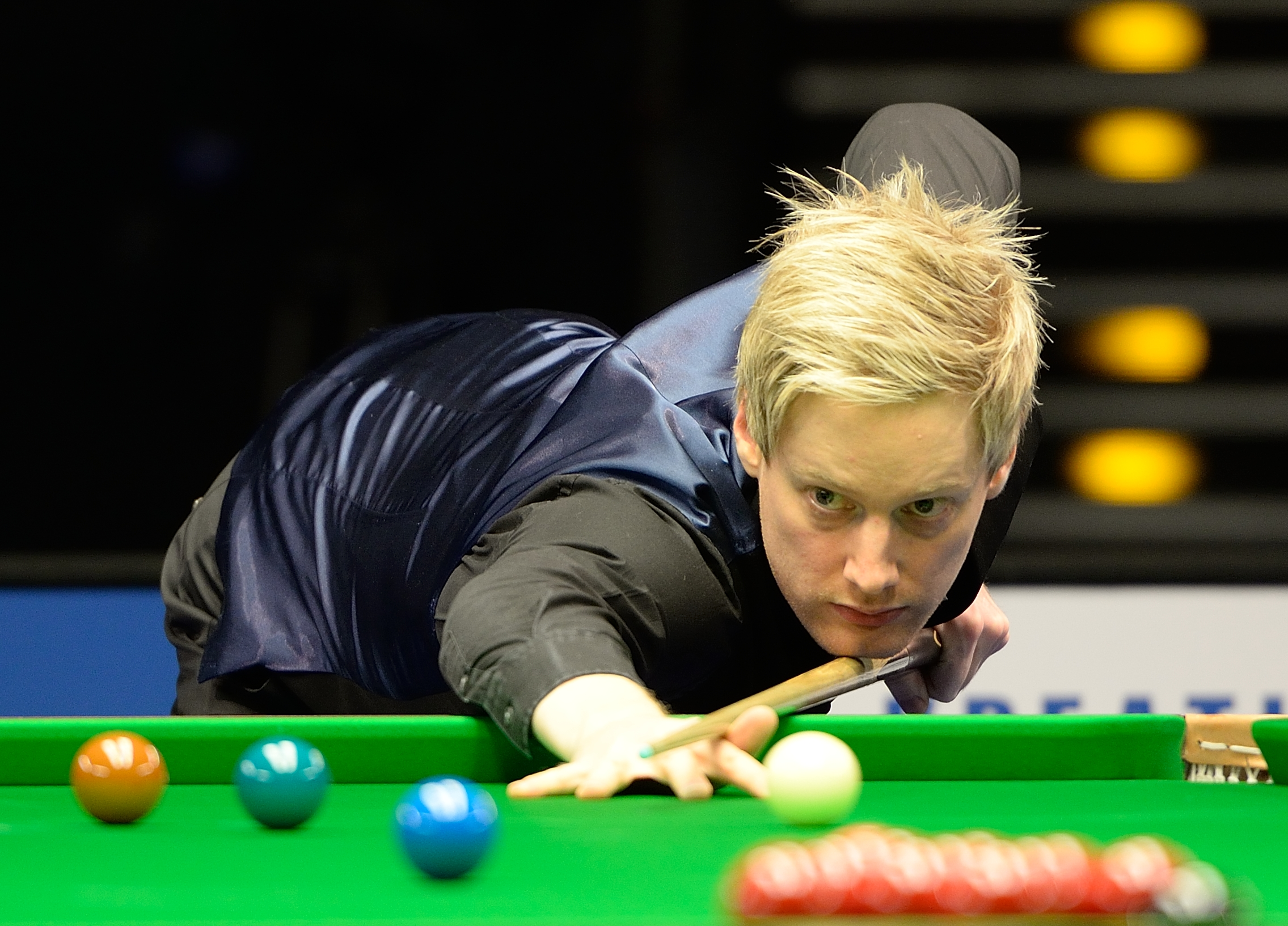
Neil Robertson (pictured in 2015) made his 900th century break in professional competition in the qualifying round.

Qualifying for the event took place from 1 to 5 September at the Morningside Arena in Leicester, England.

He Guoqiang trailed by 62 points in the deciding frame against eighth seed Kyren Wilson, but made a 64 clearance to win 5–4. The 24th seed Joe Perry was whitewashed 0–5 by Aaron Hill, who made a 145 break in the fifth frame, the joint highest of the tournament. The 19th seed Anthony McGill lost 4–5 to Ishpreet Singh Chadha, who won the deciding frame on the final black ball. Other top 32 seeds who lost out during qualifying were Shaun Murphy^{(7)}, Hossein Vafaei^{(17)}, Gary Wilson^{(18)}, Ricky Walden^{(20)}, Jimmy Robertson^{(28)}, and Fan Zhengyi^{(31)} who were beaten by Ben Mertens, Marco Fu, Ashley Carty, Ian Burns, Rod Lawler, and Stuart Carrington respectively.

Neil Robertson made his 900th century break in professional competition (a 137) in his match against fellow Australian Ryan Thomerson. He became the fourth player in professional snooker history (after Ronnie O'Sullivan, John Higgins, and Judd Trump) to reach the 900-century milestone.

=== Early rounds ===
The reigning world champion Luca Brecel withdrew prior to the main stage in Wuhan, as did tenth seed Mark Williams, Graeme Dott, and David Gilbert. Gilbert was replaced in the draw by Daniel Womersley. Due to time and visa constraints, the other players' opponents received walkovers.

==== Held-over qualifying matches ====
The held-over qualifying matches were played on 9 October as the best of nine frames. O'Sullivan lost the first frame against Ken Doherty but won five in a row with breaks including 88, 89, and 82 for a 5–1 victory. Following Brecel's withdrawal, O'Sullivan's win meant he would retain the world number one ranking after the tournament unless third seed Mark Allen won the event; Allen later lost in the quarter-finals. The 15th seed Ding Junhui defeated Ashley Hugill 5–3. The 11th seed Ali Carter defeated the 2023 British Women's Open champion Bai Yulu 5–2. Si Jiahui, a 2023 World Championship semi-finalist, made one half-century break as he defeated amateur player Wang Xinzhong by the same score.

==== Last 64 ====
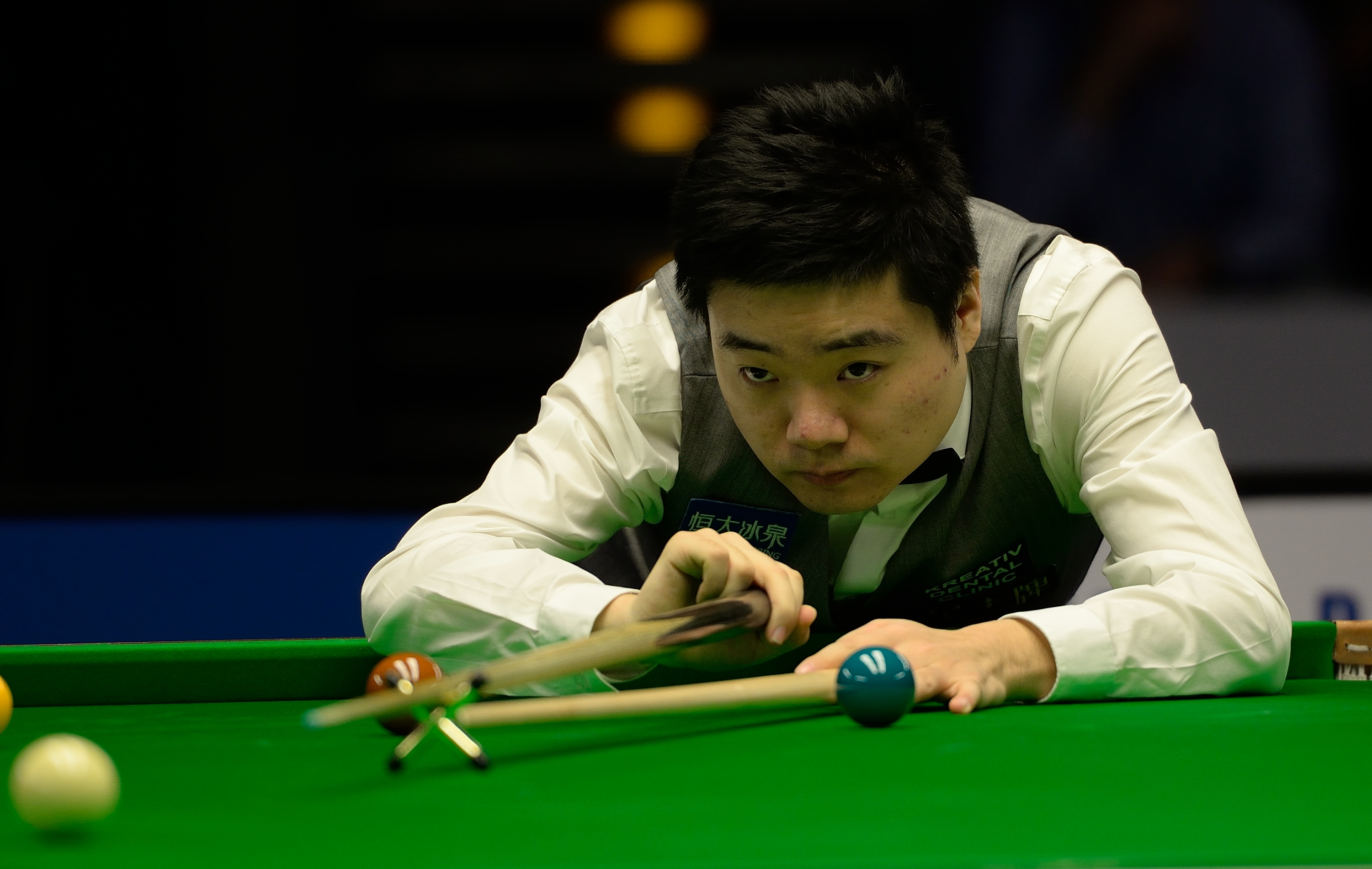
Top-ranked Chinese player Ding Junhui (pictured in 2015) exited the tournament at the last-64 stage after losing 0–5 to Yuan Sijun.

The round of 64 was played as the best of nine frames on 9 and 10 October, with the exception of the match between Judd Trump and Oliver Lines, which was played on 11 October due to Trump having arrived in China on 10 October after winning the 2023 English Open on 8 October. Allen trailed Mark Joyce 3–4 but recovered to win in a 26-minute deciding frame. Afterwards, Allen called his performance "awful" and commented: "It's been a very long time since I’ve played that badly". The 14th seed Jack Lisowski won the eighth frame on the black to defeat Scott Donaldson 5–3. Stephen Maguire defeated Joe O'Connor 5–2. Yuan Sijun whitewashed Ding 5–0, after Ding had whitewashed Yuan in their previous two encounters. World number 86 Martin O’Donnell, who had defeated Mark Selby in the previous week's British Open, defeated ninth seed Higgins 5–1. O’Sullivan defeated Mark Davis by the same score.

The fifth seed Selby lost 4–5 to Xu Si, who made a 125 break in the deciding frame. The sixth seed Neil Robertson took a 3–1 lead over Liam Highfield, making a 140 break in frame four, but Highfield won four consecutive frames with breaks of 95, 76, 63, and 68 to defeat Robertson 5–3. It was Highfield's second professional victory since an e-scooter accident that forced him to take several months away from the sport. Following his exit from the event, Robertson revealed that he would miss some tournaments at the end of the year while spending time in his native Australia. Carter made a 145 break in the fourth frame of his match against Jamie Clarke, equalling Hill's break in the qualifiers as the highest of the tournament. Carter went on to win the match 5–1. Lines made a 135 break in the fourth frame of his match against Trump, but Trump made breaks including 75, 91, 100, and 107 as he secured a 5–2 victory.

==== Last 32 ====
The round of 32 was played on 11 October as the best of nine frames. Playing his second match of the day, Trump made four half-centuries as he whitewashed Matthew Selt 5–0. Lisowski defeated Sam Craigie and Allen defeated Si, both in deciding frames. Carter trailed 1–4 against Stuart Bingham, but won four consecutive frames to clinch the match 5–4. Highfield defeated Zhou 5–3. O'Sullivan won the first two frames against Pang Junxu with breaks of 68 and 128, but Pang won the next three. O'Sullivan tied the scores at 3–3 with a 93 break, but Pang went 4–3 ahead with a 107 in frame seven. However, O'Sullivan won the last two frames with breaks of 117 and 64. Barry Hawkins defeated Jamie Jones 5–1 and Maguire beat Xing Zihao by the same score.

==== Last 16 ====
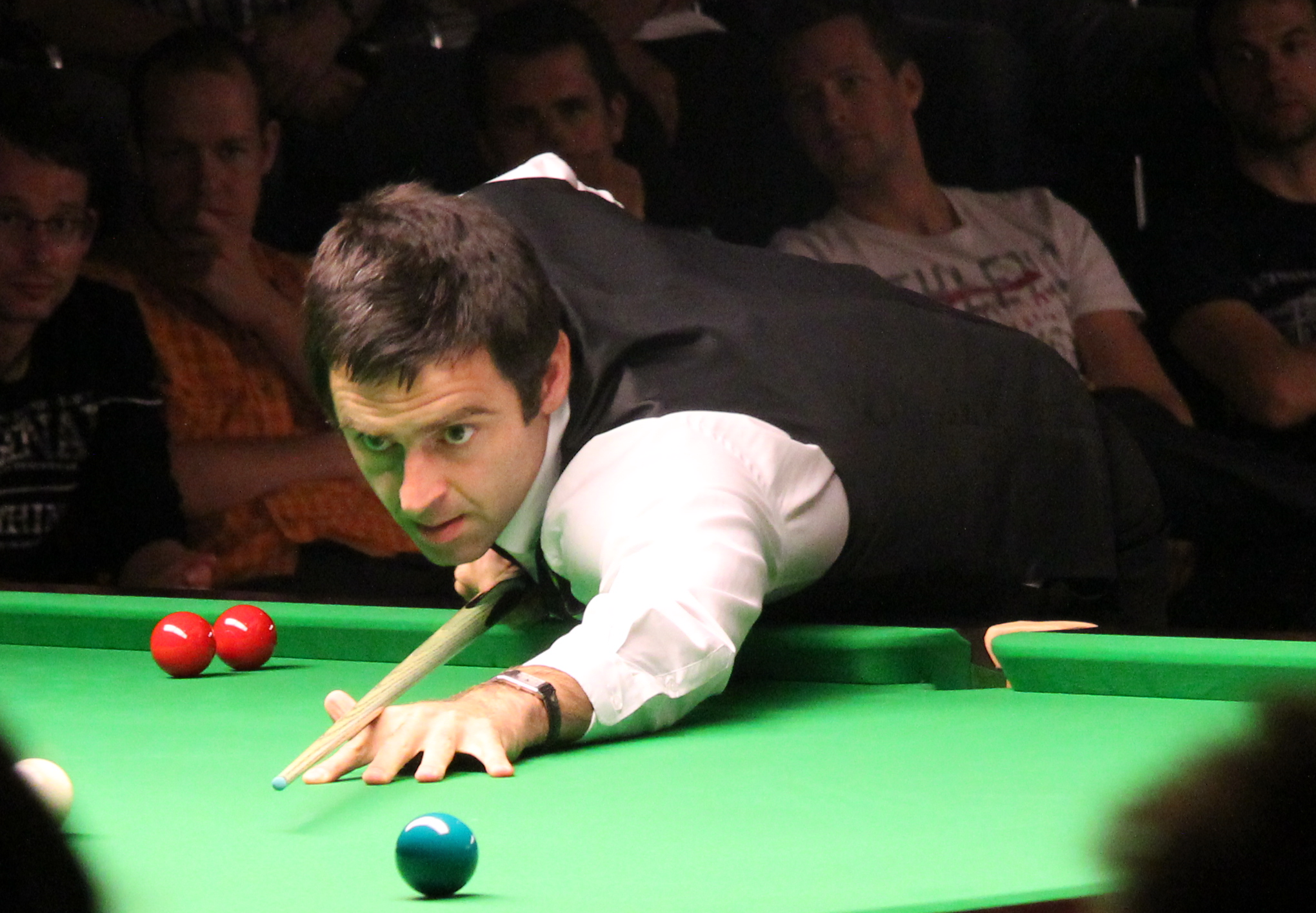
World number one Ronnie O'Sullivan (pictured in 2011) defeated Yuan Sijun 5–1 in the last 16, but lost 1–5 to Lyu Haotian in the quarter-finals.

The round of 16 was played on 12 October as the best of nine frames. O'Sullivan won the first frame against Yuan, who took the second with a 112 century. O'Sullivan made breaks including 130, 64, and 82 as he took a 4–1 lead. In the final frame, O'Sullivan trailed by 58 points and required blacks with all reds, which were in difficult positions on the table. After winning the frame for a 5–1 victory, O'Sullivan said: "I quite like that sort of challenge sometimes. I didn’t expect to win it, but you know what you have to do and know you need to go red, black, red, black to have a chance. There is nothing to lose in a frame like that". Hawkins made a 109 century in the first frame against Trump, who won the next two with breaks of 76 and 59. Hawkins tied the scores at 2–2 with an 84 break. However, Trump produced breaks of 97, 67, and 100 as he won three consecutive frames for a 5–2 victory.

Lisowski won the opener against Allen with a 118 century, but Allen won the next four frames with breaks including 54, 76, and 61. Lisowski won the sixth with a 79 break, but Allen took the seventh after a lengthy safety battle for a 5–2 win, reaching his first quarter-final of the season. Allen praised Lisowski afterwards, calling him a "class player" and saying: "You need to play well to beat him and I played better today. He will get me back in the future no doubt". Playing professionally in China for the first time, 21-year-old Irish player Aaron Hill reached the first quarter-final of his career with a 5–3 victory over He Guoqiang. Carter defeated Highfield 5–1, while Wu Yize defeated Maguire 5–4, winning the deciding frame on a re-spotted black.

=== Later rounds ===
==== Quarter-finals ====
The quarter-finals were played on 13 October as the best of nine frames. In the afternoon session Trump whitewashed Tom Ford 5–0, making a 118 break in the third frame. Trump reached the semi-finals of the event having lost only four frames. Wu defeated Hill 5–4, making a 104 break in the deciding frame to reach his first ranking semi-final. In the evening session, Lyu Haotian defeated O'Sullivan 5–1 to reach his fifth ranking semi-final; O'Sullivan praised Lyu afterwards, saying: "He didn’t miss much, scored well, played good safety and potted some good pressure balls". Carter made breaks of 78, 63, 77, 52, and 57 to beat Allen 5–2. Allen's defeat meant that O'Sullivan retained the world number one ranking.

==== Semi-finals ====
The semi-finals were played on 14 October as the best of 11 frames. In the first semi-final between Carter and Lyu, the scores were tied at 2–2 at the mid-session interval. Carter produced breaks of 96, 122, 91, and 70 to win four consecutive frames and defeat Lyu 6–2. It was Lyu's fourth loss in his five ranking semi-final appearances. Carter said afterwards: "Anyone will tell you that it is never easy to get over the line and reach a big final. To clear up and make it a relatively easy day’s work was pleasing". Trump faced Wu in the second semi-final and made breaks of 110, 53, 77, and 52 as he took a 4–0 lead. Wu won frame five with a 68 break, but Trump made breaks of 127 and 63 as he clinched a 6–1 victory. On facing Carter in the final, Trump said: "Ali will probably make it a lot more difficult than some of the younger players have done. I think he is similar to Barry Hawkins, in that you have to earn everything".

==== Final ====
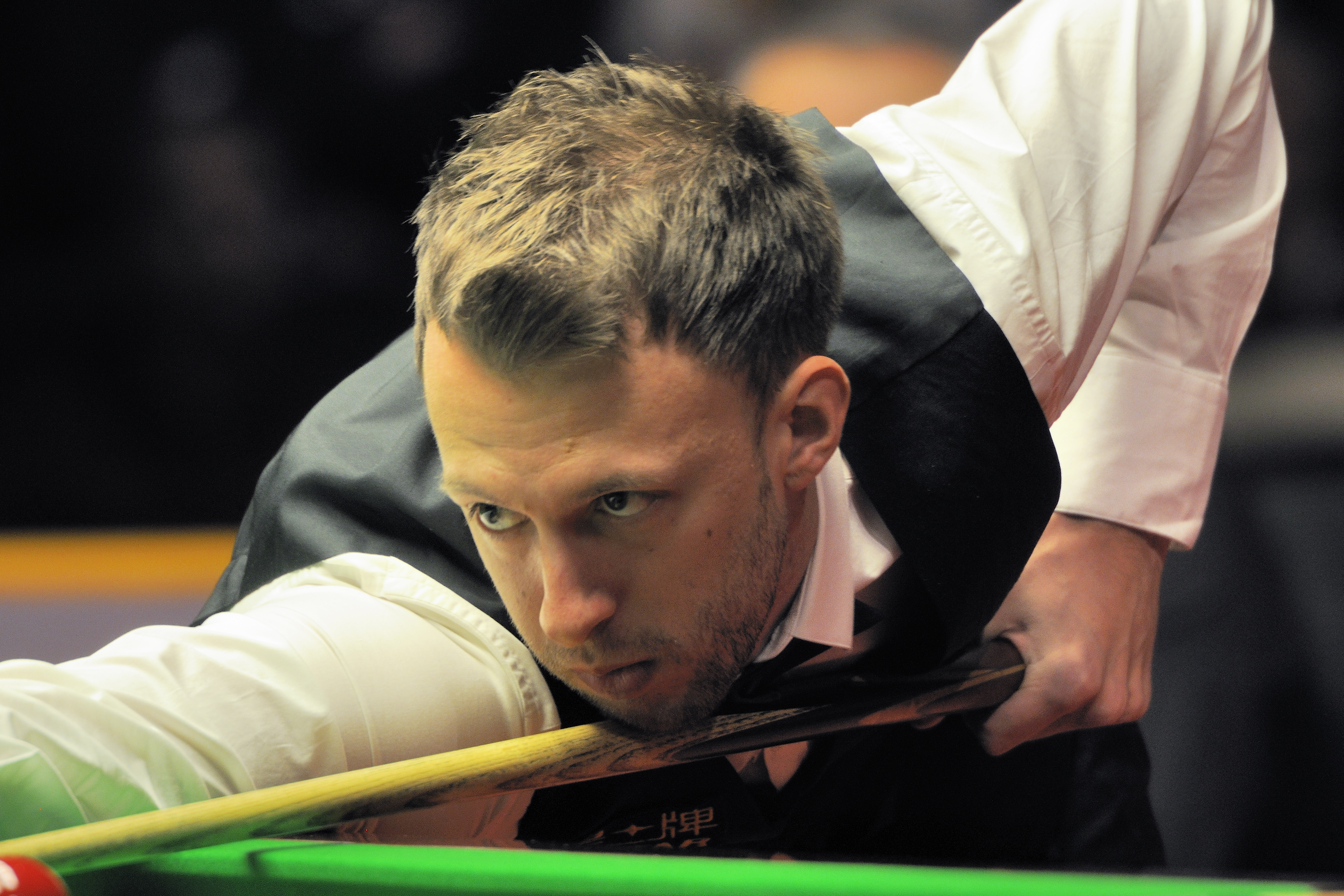
Fourth seed Judd Trump (pictured in 2014) won the event with a 10–7 victory over Ali Carter in the final. Having won the 2023 English Open the previous week, Trump became the third player, after Stephen Hendry and Mark Williams, to win back-to-back ranking tournaments in different countries.

Trump and Carter contested the final on 15 October, played as the best of 19 frames over two sessions. Trump was competing in a second consecutive ranking final, having won the English Open the previous week, while Carter, with two previous tournament wins in China, was playing in his 12th career ranking final and his third ranking final of 2023. Trump won the opening frame with a 72 break, but Carter won the second with a 103 century. Trump won three consecutive frames for a 4–1 advantage, but Carter responded to win four consecutive frames and lead 5–4 after the first session.

Trump began the second session with breaks of 116, 56, and 71 to win another three consecutive frames for a 7–5 lead. Carter took the 13th with a 56 break, but Trump won the 14th to maintain a two-frame advantage at 8–6. Carter had the opportunity to win the 15th but missed a pot on the green to a middle pocket, which let Trump go 9–6 in front. The 16th frame was decided on the pink, on which both players missed shots before Carter potted it on his second attempt to narrow Trump's lead to 9–7. However, Trump made a 105 century in the 17th frame to secure a 10–7 victory and claim the 25th ranking title of his career, which put him level with Williams at joint fifth on the all-time list. It was the fourth time in his professional career that Trump had won back-to-back ranking tournaments. He became the third player to win successive ranking tournaments in different countries, after Stephen Hendry in 1990 and Williams in 2002. "My record in finals over the last five to ten occasions hasn’t been as good as it was before, so it was nice to get the win", Trump said afterwards. "I gave it my best go and it has been a successful week", commented Carter, remarking the Wuhan Open was such a big-money event that his £63,000 runner-up prize was "almost like a tournament win" in terms of its impact on the world rankings.

== Main draw ==
The draw for the tournament is shown below. Numbers in parentheses after the players' names denote the top 32 seeded players, whilst players in bold denote match winners.

=== Top half ===
**Last 64**; Best of 9 frames
**Xing Zihao (CHN)**	**5**
Michael White (WAL)	4
**Stephen Maguire (SCO) (32)**	**5**
Joe O'Connor (ENG)	2
**Ryan Day (WAL) (16)**	**5**
Jackson Page (WAL)	4
Marco Fu (HKG)	3
**Wu Yize (CHN)**	**5**
Ben Woollaston (ENG)	1
**Aaron Hill (IRL)**	**5**
**Martin O'Donnell (ENG)**	**5**
John Higgins (SCO) (9)	1
Jordan Brown (NIR)	3
**Gong Chenzhi (CHN)**	**5**
Elliot Slessor (ENG)	2
**He Guoqiang (CHN)**	**5**
Mark Selby (ENG) (5)	4
**Xu Si (CHN)**	**5**
Rod Lawler (ENG)	2
**Xiao Guodong (CHN)**	**5**
**Robert Milkins (ENG) (12)**	**5**
Hammad Miah (ENG)	4
**Tom Ford (ENG) (21)**	**5**
Cao Yupeng (CHN)	1
**Jamie Jones (WAL)**	**5**
Ian Burns (ENG)	4
Sanderson Lam (ENG)	2
**Barry Hawkins (ENG) (13)**	**5**
Thepchaiya Un-Nooh (THA)	2
**Matthew Selt (ENG) (29)**	**5**
Oliver Lines (ENG)	2
**Judd Trump (ENG) (4)**	**5**

**Last 32**; Best of 9 frames
Xing Zihao (CHN)	1
**Stephen Maguire (SCO) (32)**	**5**
Ryan Day (WAL) (16)	2
**Wu Yize (CHN)**	**5**
**Aaron Hill (IRL)**	**5**
Martin O'Donnell (ENG)	1
Gong Chenzhi (CHN)	4
**He Guoqiang (CHN)**	**5**
Xu Si (CHN)	0
**Xiao Guodong (CHN)**	**5**
Robert Milkins (ENG) (12)	2
**Tom Ford (ENG) (21)**	**5**
Jamie Jones (WAL)	1
**Barry Hawkins (ENG) (13)**	**5**
Matthew Selt (ENG) (29)	0
**Judd Trump (ENG) (4)**	**5**

**Last 16**; Best of 9 frames
Stephen Maguire (SCO) (32)	4
**Wu Yize (CHN)**	**5**
**Aaron Hill (IRL)**	**5**
He Guoqiang (CHN)	3
Xiao Guodong (CHN)	4
**Tom Ford (ENG) (21)**	**5**
Barry Hawkins (ENG) (13)	2
**Judd Trump (ENG) (4)**	**5**

**Quarter-finals**; Best of 9 frames
**Wu Yize (CHN)**	**5**
Aaron Hill (IRL)	4
Tom Ford (ENG) (21)	0
**Judd Trump (ENG) (4)**	**5**

**Semi-finals**; Best of 11 frames
Wu Yize (CHN)	1
**Judd Trump (ENG) (4)**	**6**

=== Bottom half ===
**Last 64**; Best of 9 frames
**Mark Allen (NIR) (3)**	**5**
Mark Joyce (ENG)	4
**Si Jiahui (CHN) (30)**	**5**
Jak Jones (WAL)	4
**Jack Lisowski (ENG) (14)**	**5**
Scott Donaldson (SCO)	3
Ishpreet Singh Chadha (IND)	2
**Sam Craigie (ENG)**	**5**
Daniel Wells (WAL)	1
**Stuart Bingham (ENG) (22)**	**5**
Jamie Clarke (WAL)	1
**Ali Carter (ENG) (11)**	**5**
Anthony Hamilton (ENG)	0
**Zhou Yuelong (CHN) (27)**	**5**
**Liam Highfield (ENG)**	**5**
Neil Robertson (AUS) (6)	3
**Ben Mertens (BEL)**	**5**
Dominic Dale (WAL)	1
Chris Wakelin (ENG) (26)	2
**Lyu Haotian (CHN)**	**5**
Mark Williams (WAL) (10)	w/d
**Zhang Anda (CHN)**	**w/o**
**Noppon Saengkham (THA) (23)**	**w/o**
Graeme Dott (SCO)	w/d
Alfie Burden (ENG)	3
**Ashley Carty (ENG)**	**5**
**Yuan Sijun (CHN)**	**5**
Ding Junhui (CHN) (15)	0
**Pang Junxu (CHN)**	**5**
Stuart Carrington (ENG)	3
Mark Davis (ENG)	1
**Ronnie O'Sullivan (ENG) (2)**	**5**

**Last 32**; Best of 9 frames
**Mark Allen (NIR) (3)**	**5**
Si Jiahui (CHN) (30)	4
**Jack Lisowski (ENG) (14)**	**5**
Sam Craigie (ENG)	4
Stuart Bingham (ENG) (22)	4
**Ali Carter (ENG) (11)**	**5**
Zhou Yuelong (CHN) (27)	3
**Liam Highfield (ENG)**	**5**
Ben Mertens (BEL)	1
**Lyu Haotian (CHN)**	**5**
**Zhang Anda (CHN)**	**5**
Noppon Saengkham (THA) (23)	1
Ashley Carty (ENG)	2
**Yuan Sijun (CHN)**	**5**
Pang Junxu (CHN)	4
**Ronnie O'Sullivan (ENG) (2)**	**5**

**Last 16**; Best of 9 frames
**Mark Allen (NIR) (3)**	**5**
Jack Lisowski (ENG) (14)	2
**Ali Carter (ENG) (11)**	**5**
Liam Highfield (ENG)	1
**Lyu Haotian (CHN)**	**5**
Zhang Anda (CHN)	2
Yuan Sijun (CHN)	1
**Ronnie O'Sullivan (ENG) (2)**	**5**

**Quarter-finals**; Best of 9 frames
Mark Allen (NIR) (3)	2
**Ali Carter (ENG) (11)**	**5**
**Lyu Haotian (CHN)**	**5**
Ronnie O'Sullivan (ENG) (2)	1

**Semi-finals**; Best of 11 frames
**Ali Carter (ENG) (11)**	**6**
Lyu Haotian (CHN)	2

Note: w/d=withdrawn; w/o=walk-over

=== Final ===
Final: Best of 19 frames. Referee: Zheng Weili; Wuhan Gymnasium, Wuhan, China, 15 October 2023
**Judd Trump** (4); England	**10**–7	Ali Carter (11); England
Afternoon: **118**–0, 0–**103** (103), **88**–56, **84**–24, **105**–30, 27–**80**, 0–**68**, 47–**70**, 48–**77**; Evening: **116**–14 (116), **83**–1, **75**–31, 25–**76**, **76**–43, **62**–46, 57–**74**, **122**–0 (105)
(frame 10) **116**	Highest break	103 (frame 2)
**2**	Century breaks	1

== Qualifying ==
Qualification for the tournament took place from 1 to 5 September at the Morningside Arena in Leicester. Numbers in parentheses after the players' names denote the top 32 seeded players, whilst players in bold denote match winners.

=== Wuhan ===
Qualifying matches featuring the top two players in the world rankings (Ronnie O'Sullivan and Luca Brecel), the two highest ranked Chinese players (Ding Junhui and Zhou Yuelong), and four Chinese wildcards (Gong Chenzhi, Bai Yulu, Wang Xinbo, and Wang Xinzhong) were held over to be played in Wuhan. Brecel withdrew in advance of the tournament and his opponent Xing Zihao received a walkover. David Gilbert also withdrew and was replaced by Daniel Womersley. Results of the held-over matches played in Wuhan on 9 October were as follows:

- Luca Brecel (BEL) (1) w/d–**w/o** **Xing Zihao** (CHN)
- **Ronnie O'Sullivan** (ENG) (2) **5**–1 Ken Doherty (IRL)
- **Ding Junhui** (CHN) (15) **5**–3 Ashley Hugill (ENG)
- **Zhou Yuelong** (CHN) (27) **5**–2 Baipat Siripaporn (THA)
- **Si Jiahui** (CHN) (30) **5**–2 Wang Xinzhong (CHN)
- **Ali Carter** (ENG) (11) **5**–2 Bai Yulu (CHN)
- Daniel Womersley (ENG) 3–**5** **Gong Chenzhi** (CHN) (Note: Daniel Womersley replaced David Gilbert who withdrew.)
- **Anthony Hamilton** (ENG) **5**–0 Wang Xinbo (CHN)

Note: w/d=withdrawn; w/o=walk-over

=== Leicester ===
The results of the qualifying matches played in Leicester were as follows:

==== 1 September ====
- **Ryan Day** (WAL) (16) **5**–3 Long Zehuang (CHN)
- **Wu Yize** (CHN) **5**–3 Allan Taylor (ENG)
- Kyren Wilson (ENG) (8) 4–**5** **He Guoqiang** (CHN)
- **Mark Allen** (NIR) (3) **5**–3 John Astley (ENG)
- **Neil Robertson** (AUS) (6) **5**–0 Ryan Thomerson (AUS)
- **Noppon Saengkham** (THA) (23) **5**–3 Andrew Higginson (ENG)
- Robbie Williams (ENG) 0–**5** **Alfie Burden** (ENG)
- Gary Wilson (ENG) (18) 3–**5** **Ashley Carty** (ENG)
- **Joe O'Connor** (ENG) **5**–0 Dean Young (SCO)
- **Jackson Page** (WAL) **5**–3 Liu Hongyu (CHN)
- **Ben Woollaston** (ENG) **5**–2 Oliver Brown (ENG)
- **Mark Selby** (ENG) (5) **5**–0 Andy Lee (HKG)

==== 2 September ====
- **Xu Si** (CHN) **5**–3 Anton Kazakov (UKR)
- **Cao Yupeng** (CHN) **5**–0 Jiang Jun (CHN)
- Tian Pengfei (CHN) 3–**5** **Sanderson Lam** (ENG)
- **Zhang Anda** (CHN) **5**–3 Ahmed Aly Elsayed (USA)
- Joe Perry (ENG) (24) 0–**5** **Aaron Hill** (IRL)
- Andy Hicks (ENG) 3–**5** **Hammad Miah** (ENG)
- **Yuan Sijun** (CHN) **5**–1 Ross Muir (SCO)
- Fan Zhengyi (CHN) (31) 1–**5** **Stuart Carrington** (ENG)
- David Grace (ENG) 2–**5** **Martin O'Donnell** (ENG)
- **Elliot Slessor** (ENG) **5**–0 David Lilley (ENG)
- **Robert Milkins** (ENG) (12) **5**–2 Zak Surety (ENG)
- **Stuart Bingham** (ENG) (22) **5**–3 James Cahill (ENG)

==== 3 September ====
- **Thepchaiya Un-Nooh** (THA) **5**–2 Rory Thor (MAS)
- **Scott Donaldson** (SCO) **5**–1 Ma Hailong (CHN)
- Anthony McGill (SCO) (19) 4–**5** **Ishpreet Singh Chadha** (IND)
- **Chris Wakelin** (ENG) (26) **5**–2 Mink Nutcharut (THA)
- **Tom Ford** (ENG) (21) **5**–2 Adam Duffy (ENG)
- **Jamie Jones** (WAL) **5**–4 Liam Pullen (ENG)
- **Jack Lisowski** (ENG) (14) **5**–0 Jenson Kendrick (ENG)
- **Pang Junxu** (CHN) **5**–1 Stan Moody (ENG)
- **Barry Hawkins** (ENG) (13) **5**–1 Louis Heathcote (ENG)
- **Matthew Selt** (ENG) (29) **5**–3 Sean O'Sullivan (ENG)
- **Oliver Lines** (ENG) **5**–0 Reanne Evans (ENG)
- **Mark Williams** (WAL) (10) **5**–2 Andres Petrov (EST)

==== 4 September ====
- **Mark Joyce** (ENG) **5**–1 Victor Sarkis (BRA)
- Matthew Stevens (WAL) 1–**5** **Daniel Wells** (WAL)
- **Jamie Clarke** (WAL) **5**–0 Mohamed Ibrahim (EGY)
- **Lyu Haotian** (CHN) **5**–2 Muhammad Asif (PAK)
- Jimmy Robertson (ENG) (28) 4–**5** **Rod Lawler** (ENG)
- **Judd Trump** (ENG) (4) **5**–1 Lukas Kleckers (GER)
- **Jak Jones** (WAL) **5**–2 Mostafa Dorgham (EGY)
- **Graeme Dott** (SCO) **5**–3 Julien Leclercq (BEL)
- **Stephen Maguire** (SCO) (32) **5**–2 M. Phetmalaikul (THA)
- **Xiao Guodong** (CHN) **5**–0 Alexander Ursenbacher (SUI)
- Shaun Murphy (ENG) (7) 2–**5** **Ben Mertens** (BEL)
- **Dominic Dale** (WAL) **5**–0 Rebecca Kenna (ENG)

==== 5 September ====
- **Michael White** (WAL) **5**–3 Andrew Pagett (WAL)
- Hossein Vafaei (IRN) (17) 4–**5** **Marco Fu** (HKG)
- **Jordan Brown** (NIR) **5**–1 Himanshu Jain (IND)
- **Mark Davis** (ENG) **5**–1 Liam Graham (SCO)
- **John Higgins** (SCO) (9) **5**–1 Dylan Emery (WAL)
- Ricky Walden (ENG) (20) 3–**5** **Ian Burns** (ENG)
- **Sam Craigie** (ENG) **5**–1 Peng Yisong (CHN)
- **Liam Highfield** (ENG) **5**–1 Jimmy White (ENG)

== Century breaks ==
=== Main stage centuries ===
A total of 69 century breaks were made during the main stage of the tournament in Wuhan.

- 145, 122, 103, 102 – Ali Carter
- 143, 137, 105, 102, 101 – Zhou Yuelong
- 140 – Neil Robertson
- 138, 127 – Tom Ford
- 137, 115 – He Guoqiang
- 136, 131, 121, 100 – Aaron Hill
- 135, 107, 104 – Pang Junxu
- 135, 109, 100 – Barry Hawkins
- 135 – Oliver Lines
- 132, 107 – Stuart Bingham
- 132 – Ishpreet Singh Chadha
- 130, 128, 117, 101, 101 – Ronnie O'Sullivan
- 127, 118, 116, 110, 107, 105, 100, 100 – Judd Trump
- 125 – Ian Burns
- 125 – Xu Si
- 122, 120, 117, 113 – Xiao Guodong
- 120, 112, 107, 102, 100 – Yuan Sijun
- 120, 102 – Jordan Brown
- 120, 101 – Si Jiahui
- 118 – Jack Lisowski
- 114 – Matthew Selt
- 111 – Anthony Hamilton
- 105, 103, 100 – Lyu Haotian
- 109 – Elliot Slessor
- 108, 104 – Wu Yize
- 103 – Ashley Carty
- 101 – Sam Craigie
- 100 – Robert Milkins
- 100 – Stephen Maguire

=== Qualifying stage centuries ===
A total of 32 century breaks were made during the qualifying stage of the tournament in Leicester.

- 145 – Aaron Hill
- 137 – Neil Robertson
- 134 – Cao Yupeng
- 132, 128 – Michael White
- 132 – Sanderson Lam
- 132 – Anthony McGill
- 131 – Ben Woollaston
- 122, 101 – Kyren Wilson
- 120 – John Astley
- 117 – Mark Joyce
- 117 – Ben Mertens
- 116 – Yuan Sijun
- 116 – Tom Ford
- 115 – John Higgins
- 113 – Gary Wilson
- 112 – Jordan Brown
- 111, 107 – Stuart Carrington
- 109 – Mark Allen
- 109 – Andrew Higginson
- 108 – Jack Lisowski
- 106 – Mark Selby
- 105 – Ishpreet Singh Chadha
- 104 – Tian Pengfei
- 104 – Liam Highfield
- 103 – Anton Kazakov
- 102 – Ryan Day
- 101 – He Guoqiang
- 100 – Pang Junxu
- 100 – Jak Jones
