= Chris Christofi =

Australian entrepreneur, author, and philanthropist (born 1979)

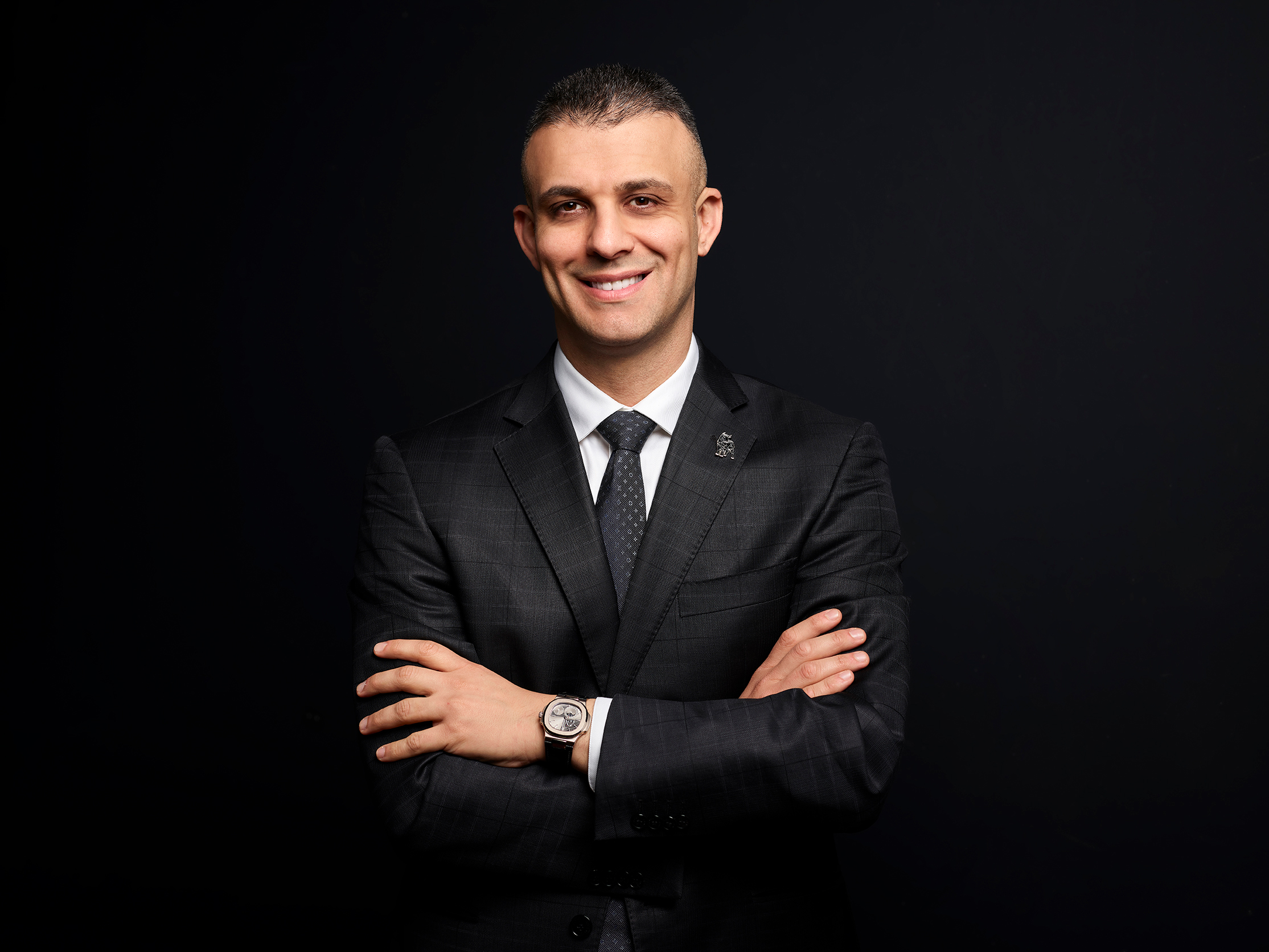
- Christofi in 2025
- Born: October 23, 1979 (age 46); Melbourne, Victoria, Australia
- Occupations: Author; Philanthropist
- Years active: 2005–present
- Known for: Relentless: Life on Your Terms
- Children: 4
- Website: chrischristofi.com.au

Chris Christofi (born 1979) is an Australian author and philanthropist who is the founder and chief executive officer of Reventon, an Australian financial services company established in 2005. He is the author of Your Path to Wealth: Brick by Brick and the host of the podcast Relentless: Life on Your Terms.

== Early life ==
Christofi was born in Melbourne, Australia, to Peter and Andigoni (Annette) Christofi, who are both Greek Cypriots. He is the youngest of 4 children, with elder siblings Pat, Zen & Artemis.

In 1989, he, along with his family, moved back to Cyprus when he was 9 years old. At the age of 10, he started selling lottery tickets on the streets of Cyprus and working 10-hour shifts at his father's supermarket on the weekends and school holidays. As a child, he was an avid skateboarder, following in the footsteps of his brother Zen, who skateboarded at a very high level. he also loved playing table tennis. He enjoyed kickboxing and participated in 7 fights with a fight record of 4 wins, 1 draw, and 2 losses. He was trained by his oldest brother Pat, who is also a decorated kickboxer, winning multiple fights, including two Australian titles.

Around the age of 13, he fell in love with cue sports, particularly pool and snooker.

== Career ==
He started playing snooker at the age of 14 when he lived in Cyprus. He returned to Australia when he was 16 and started playing for Brunswick where he was promoted to A grade. Later, he competed in the Australian U18 and U21 national tournaments, representing Victoria alongside his friends Neil Robertson and James Mifsud. He has won snooker events, including Vic Minors and has played in the quarter-finals of open snooker events.

In 2010, at a time when the sport was declining, he started sponsoring the Australian Billiards and Snooker Council (ABSC) and also saw the creation of its own ranking system, named the Reventon Ranking system.

In 2018, he initiated the Brick-by-Brick fundraising project in partnership with the St Vincent de Paul Society (SVDP). The initiative involved purchasing land, constructing a home, and donating all proceeds from the final sale to support SVDP's homelessness services across Australia. In June 2018, he set a target to raise $40,000. He raised $40,185 for Vinnies CEO Sleepout, to which he contributed $10,000. In 2019, he was appointed as an ambassador for Vinnies. In September 2019, he started a new podcast named RELENTLESS: Life On Your Terms. He also published his best-selling book, Your Path To Wealth: Brick By Brick in 2019.

In 2020, the CEO Sleepout was virtual due to COVID, so he slept on the streets of Melbourne for two consecutive nights in June along with his then-wife.

In 2022, he completed his 5th Vinnies CEO Sleep Out.

In April 2025, he donated a completed home to the organisation through the Brick by Brick fundraising project. In May 2025, he hosted the 5th and final Lead with Kindness Black Tie Soiree, attended by 324 guests and raising A$203,665, of which A$71,089 was donated to the St Vincent de Paul Society.

== Philanthropy ==
Christofi has sponsored charitable initiatives such as White Ribbon Australia, Expression Australia, World Vision. He is a major contributor to Vinnies' "CEO Sleepout", a charity which raises awareness regarding homelessness.

== See also ==
- Reventon Triple Crown
