= Reventon Triple Crown =

Australian series of snooker tournaments

Tournament information
- Venue: Reventon Snooker Academy
- Location: Melbourne
- Country: Australia
- Established: 2019
- Organisation(s): Australian Billiards and Snooker Council (ABSC)
- Format: Series
- Total prize fund: AU$ 135,700 (2019)
- Current champion: (India) Sourav Kothari (Masters and Classic) (Australia) James Mifsud (International)

The Reventon Triple Crown is a series of snooker tournaments held in the Reventon Snooker Academy, Melbourne, Australia. It is formed by the tournaments Reventon Masters, Reventon Classic and Reventon International, and is held annually.

== History ==
The Reventon Triple Crown is organized by the Australian Billiards and Snooker Council (ABSC) and the series counts for both National and International rankings. The series began by the initiative of Chris Christofi, CEO of Reventon Finance and Investments, who has sponsored National Billiards and National Snooker rankings since 2010. The concept started with the creation of Reventon Masters, a winner-takes-all tournament played by the top-ranked players who in events ranked in ABSC. In 2018, the Reventon Classic was added to the schedule, and the Triple Crown was completed by the creation of the Reventon International in 2019.

As of 2020, Reventon Triple Crown has had 278 entries and disclosed AU$135,700 in prize payouts, and part of the funds raised for the tournament are donated to White Ribbon Foundation.

== Results ==
A list of all winners of the Reventon Triple Crown events is shown below by season:

Season	Reventon Masters	Reventon Classic	Reventon International	Total Prizepool (AUD)
2016	(Australia) James Mifsud (1/2)	started in 2018	started in 2019	Undisclosed
2017	(Australia) Ryan Thomerson (1/1)	started in 2018	started in 2019	Undisclosed
2018	(Australia) Steve Mifsud (1/1)	(Australia) Aaron Mahomey (1/1)	started in 2019	41,400
2019	(India) Sourav Kothari (1/2)	(India) Sourav Kothari (2/2)	(Australia) James Mifsud (2/2)	94,300
