= Matthew Bolton =

Australian billiards player (born 1979)

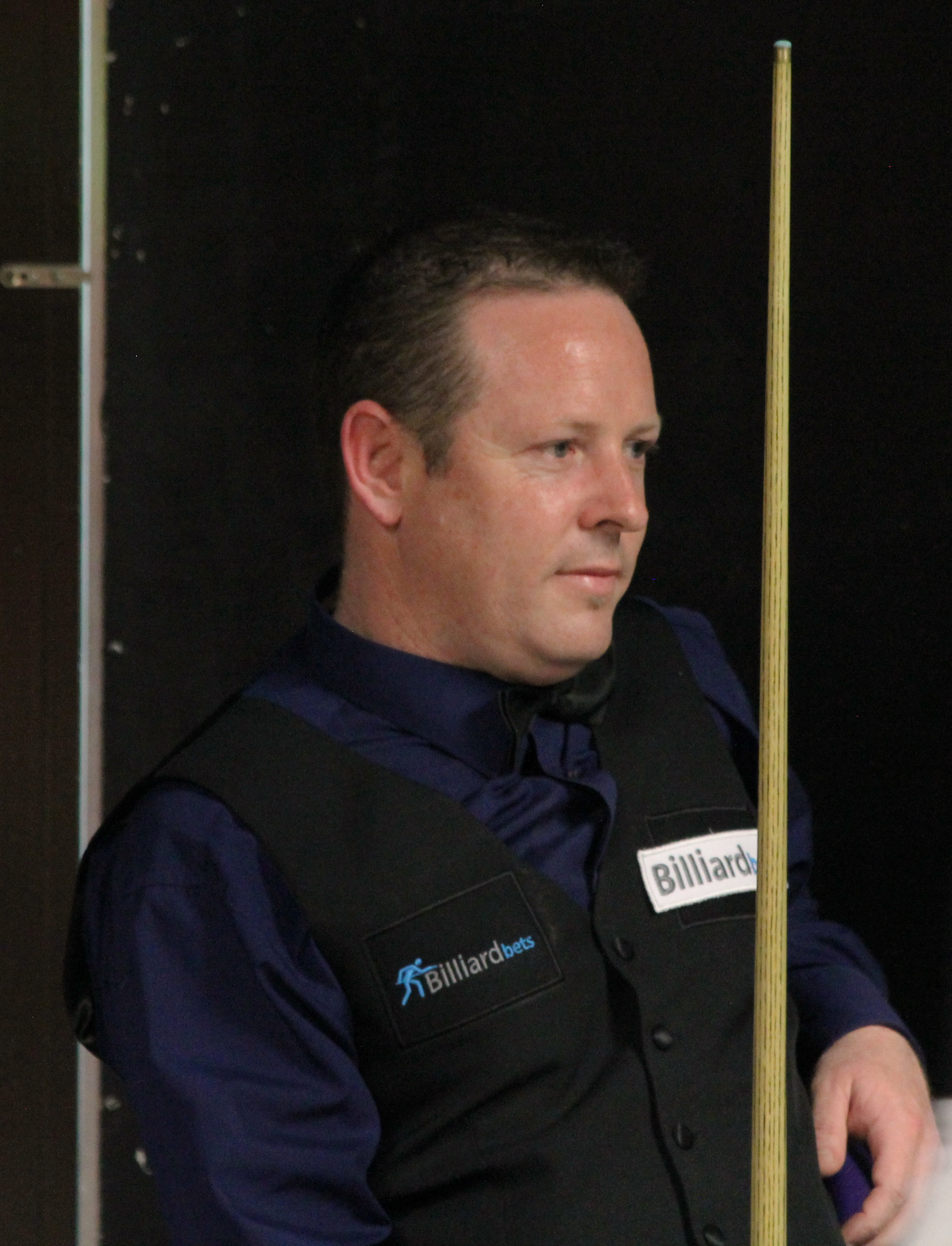
- Paul Hunter Classic 2017

Personal information
- Born: 7 July 1979 (age 47) Perth, WA

Sport
- Country: Australia
- Sport: Snooker
- Professional: 2017/2018
- Highest ranking: 106 (June 2017)

Matthew Bolton (born 7 July 1979 in Perth, WA) is an Australian billiards player. He is one of the most successful English billiards players of his country. Internationally, he is also successful as a snooker player where he became professional in 2017.

== Career ==
Between 2000 and 2017 Matthew Bolton was the 15-time winner of the Australian National Billiards Championship and unbeaten from 2004 on (in 2012 he could not participate). He is the most successful billiards player in his country since Bob Marshall who won 21 titles. In 2011 and 2012 he was runner-up in the respective world championships and world number 1 in the 2012/2013 season.

Bolton also became the national snooker champion in 2014. He qualified for the World Snooker Tour by winning the 2017 OBSF Oceanian Snooker Championship. He defeated Ben Judge 6–3 in the final. He did not win a match on the main tour and resigned his tour place in August 2018.

== Performance and rankings timeline ==
Tournament	2014/ 15	2015/ 16	2016/ 17	2017/ 18	2018/ 19
Ranking (Note: It shows the ranking at the beginning of the season.)	(Note: He was an amateur.)			(Note: New players on the Main Tour don't have a ranking.)	(Note: Since August 2018 he was an amateur.)
Ranking tournaments
Riga Masters (Note: The event was called the Riga Open (2014/2015–2015/2016))	MR		A	A	A
World Open	Not Held		A	LQ	A
Paul Hunter Classic	MR		A	1R	A
China Championship	Not Held		NR	A	A
European Masters	Not Held		A	LQ	A
English Open	Not Held		A	1R	A
International Championship	A	A	A	LQ	A
Northern Ireland Open	Not Held		A	1R	A
UK Championship	A	A	A	1R	A
Scottish Open	Not Held		A	1R	A
German Masters	A	A	A	LQ	A
World Grand Prix	NR	DNQ	DNQ	DNQ	DNQ
Welsh Open	A	A	A	A	A
Shoot-Out	NR		A	A	A
Indian Open	A	NH	A	LQ	A
Players Championship	DNQ	DNQ	DNQ	DNQ	DNQ
Gibraltar Open	NH	MR	A	A	A
Tour Championship	Tournament Not Held				DNQ
China Open	A	A	A	A	A
World Championship	A	A	A	LQ	A
Former ranking tournaments
Australian Goldfields Open	WR	A	Not Held		
Shanghai Masters	A	A	A	LQ	NR

Performance Table Legend
LQ	lost in the qualifying draw	#R	lost in the early rounds of the tournament (WR = Wildcard round, RR = Round robin)	QF	lost in the quarter-finals
SF	lost in the semi-finals	F	lost in the final	W	won the tournament
DNQ	did not qualify for the tournament	A	did not participate in the tournament	WD	withdrew from the tournament

NH / Not Held	means an event was not held.
NR / Non-Ranking Event	means an event is/was no longer a ranking event.
R / Ranking Event	means an event is/was a ranking event.
MR / Minor-Ranking Event	means an event is/was a minor-ranking event.
