= Vinnie Calabrese =

Australian snooker player

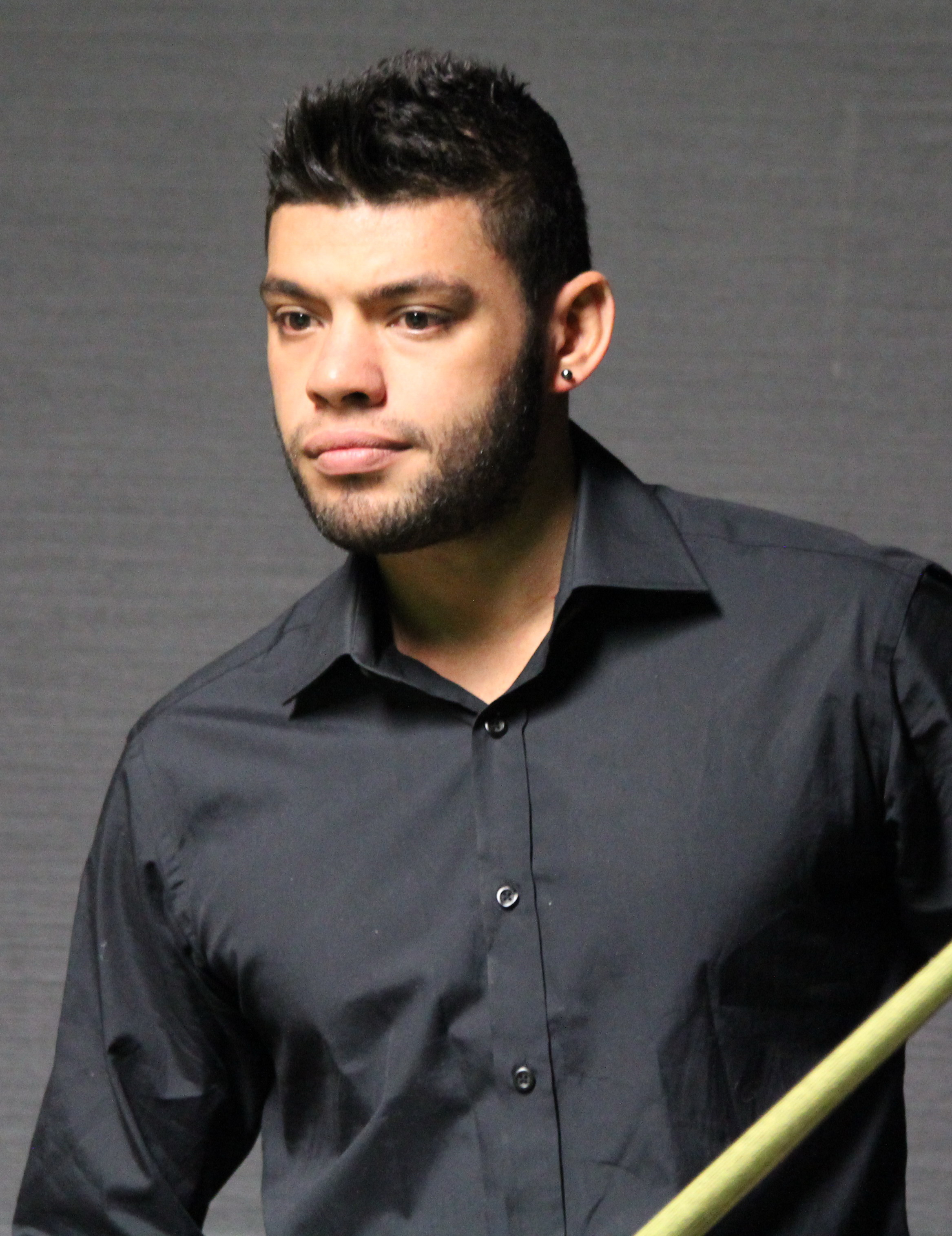
- Calabrese at the 2014 Paul Hunter Classic

Personal information
- Born: 7 October 1987 (age 39) Campbelltown, New South Wales, Australia

Sport
- Country: Australia
- Sport: Snooker
- Professional: 2013–2016
- Highest ranking: 79 (June–July 2014)

Vincent "Vinnie" Calabrese (born 7 October 1987) is an Australian former professional snooker player from Campbelltown, New South Wales. He was based in Cambridge together with his compatriot Neil Robertson, although he has since moved back to Australia.

== Early career ==
Calabrese started playing snooker aged 7 and soon came to success, winning a number of local tournaments. At the age of just 16 he had already claimed the Australian Snooker Championship. Since 2006 he has been spending a lot of time in England, playing in the PIOS tournaments and practising with Neil Robertson. His initial attempts to gain the main tour place via PIOS and later Q School were unsuccessful, however in 2013 he captured the Oceania Championship in Papua New Guinea with a 6–5 victory against Matthew Bolton to earn a two-year card for the 2013–14 and 2014–15 seasons.

=== 2013/2014 season ===
Thanks to the newly introduced flat draws, Calabrese was able to qualify for the venue stages of his debut tournament, the Wuxi Classic, as he defeated Anthony McGill 5–3. He lost 5–1 to John Higgins in the last 64 at the venue in China. At the UK Championship he led world number 22 Dominic Dale 5–2, but was pegged back to 5–5 with Calabrese saying afterwards that he couldn't hold himself together. However, in the deciding frame he made a composed 70 break to win 6–5 before losing 6–3 against Gary Wilson in the second round. Calabrese was knocked out of the first round of seven of the eight European Tour events, but at the Bluebell Wood Open he defeated world number two Mark Selby 4–2, Dechawat Poomjaeng 4–2 and David Morris 4–1 and then led Jimmy Robertson 3–0 in the last 16, but was beaten 4–3. He finished his debut season on the tour ranked world number 105.

=== 2014/2015 season ===
Calabrese won just two matches during the 2014–15 season. In February 2015, Calabrese gave up his World Snooker Tour card after the Welsh Open, in which he lost 4–1 to Ronnie O'Sullivan in the first round, to return to being an amateur player so he could compete in the Oceania Championship. In March 2015, Calabrese won the Oceania Championship by defeating Matthew Bolton 6–3 in the final and earned a two-year tour card for the 2015–16 and 2016–17 seasons.

=== 2015/2016 season ===
Calabrese won just two of 13 games during the 2015/2016 season. Despite having a tour card which also covered the 2016/2017 season, he resigned from the tour in February 2016.

== Performance and rankings timeline ==
| Tournament | 2013/ 14 | 2014/ 15 | 2015/ 16 |
|---|---|---|---|
| Ranking (Note: It shows the ranking at the beginning of the season) | (Note: New players on the Main Tour don't have a ranking) | (Note: Since February 2015 he was an amateur) | |
Ranking tournaments
| Australian Goldfields Open | LQ | LQ | LQ |
| Shanghai Masters | LQ | LQ | LQ |
| International Championship | LQ | LQ | LQ |
| UK Championship | 2R | 1R | 1R |
| German Masters | LQ | LQ | LQ |
| Welsh Open | 1R | 1R | 1R |
| World Grand Prix | NH | NR | DNQ |
| Players Tour Championship Grand Final | DNQ | DNQ | DNQ |
| China Open | LQ | A | LQ |
| World Championship | LQ | A | A |
Non-ranking tournaments
| Six-red World Championship | RR | A | A |
Former ranking tournaments
| World Open | LQ | Not held | |
| Wuxi Classic | 1R | LQ | NH |
| Indian Open | LQ | A | NH |

Performance Table Legend
| LQ | lost in the qualifying draw | #R | lost in the early rounds of the tournament (WR = Wildcard round, RR = Round robin) | QF | lost in the quarter-finals |
| SF | lost in the semi-finals | F | lost in the final | W | won the tournament |
| DNQ | did not qualify for the tournament | A | did not participate in the tournament | WD | withdrew from the tournament |

| NH / Not Held | means an event was not held. |
| NR / Non-Ranking Event | means an event is/was no longer a ranking event. |
| R / Ranking Event | means an event is/was a ranking event. |

== Career finals ==
=== Amateur finals: 15 (8 titles) ===
| Outcome | No. | Year | Championship | Opponent in the final | Score |
|---|---|---|---|---|---|
| Winner | 1. | 2004 | Australian Under-18 Championship | (Australia) Michael Lupton | 6–5 |
| Runner-up | 1. | 2005 | Australian Under-21 Championship | (Australia) Adam Kinghorn | 5–6 |
| Winner | 2. | 2005 | Australian Under-18 Championship | (Australia) Justin Sajich | 5–1 |
| Winner | 3. | 2005 | Australian Amateur Championship | (Australia) Roger Farebrother | 6–4 |
| Winner | 4. | 2006 | Australian Under-21 Championship | (Australia) Michael Lupton | 8–3 |
| Winner | 5. | 2007 | Australian Under-21 Championship | (Australia) Michael Lupton | 6–4 |
| Winner | 6. | 2008 | Australian Under-21 Championship | (Australia) Ricky Emery | 6–2 |
| Runner-up | 2. | 2010 | Australian Open Championship | (Australia) Steve Mifsud | 5–6 |
| Runner-up | 3. | 2012 | Australian Open Championship | (Australia) Shawn Budd | 5–6 |
| Runner-up | 4. | 2013 | Oceania 6-red Championship | (Australia) Adrian Ridley | 0–5 |
| Winner | 7. | 2013 | Oceania Championship | (Australia) Matthew Bolton | 6–5 |
| Winner | 8. | 2015 | Oceania Championship | (Australia) Matthew Bolton | 6–3 |
| Runner-up | 5. | 2016 | Australian Amateur Championship | (Australia) James Mifsud | 1–6 |
| Runner-up | 6. | 2023 | Asia Pacific 6-Reds Championship | (Australia) Shaun Dalitz | 2–4 |
| Runner-up | 7. | 2026 | Asia Pacific Championship | (England) Paul Norris | 5–6 |
