= Steve Mifsud =

Maltese Australian professional snooker player

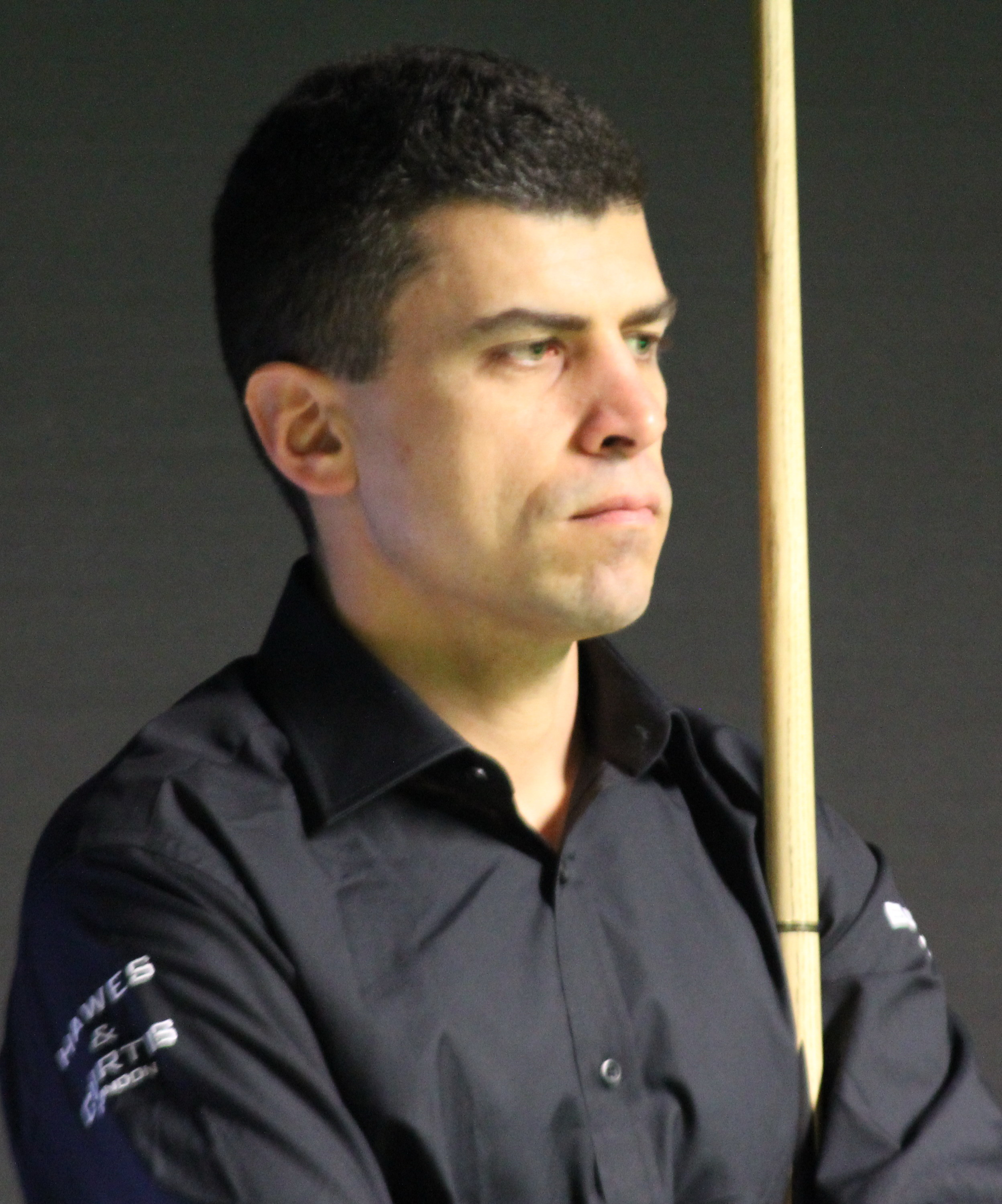

Personal information
- Born: 25 August 1972 (age 54) Australia

Sport
- Country: Australia
- Sport: Snooker
- Professional: 1991–1994, 1998/1999, 2003/2004, 2007/2008, 2014–2016, 2019–2021
- Highest ranking: 93 (June 2015)
- Best ranking finish: Last 32 (x1)

Steve Mifsud (born 25 August 1972 in Australia) is an Australian former professional snooker player. The World Snooker Federation has called Mifsud "the most successful player in the history of the Australian National Snooker Championship", winning the Australian National Snooker Championship a record 11 times, the most recent title won in 2024. Steve Mifsud is ranked number 1 in Australia for billiards and is at the top of ABSC rankings, and has won the Australian Billiards Championship 6 times.

== Career ==
Steve Mifsud has won 26 Australian snooker and billiards titles. He has won the Australian National Snooker Championships a record-breaking 11 times in the years 2001, 2002, 2003, 2004, 2010, 2011, 2013, 2018, 2022, 2023, and 2024.

Mifsud won the Australian Billiards Championships every year since 2022, totaling 6 Australian Billiards Championship wins in his billiards career to date, winning in 2003, 2012, and 2022, 2023, 2024, and 2025.

Steve Mifsud was the winner of the IBSF World Amateur Championship in Cairo, Egypt in 2002, the only Australian to have ever won, beating Tim English 11–6 in the final which enabled him to get on the main tour for the 2003–04 season. He was runner-up to Mark Allen in the same event two years later.

He got back onto the main tour for the 2007–08 season by finishing top of the Australian rankings.

Steve was Neil Robertson's partner in the 2011 World Cup where he helped Australia reach the quarter-finals. He, along with his brother James, was given a wildcard for Australian Open.

In 2014 Mifsud won the Oceania Snooker Championship, regaining his Main Tour place for the 2014–15 and 2015–16 seasons.

In 2018, Mifsud won the Reventon Masters, the premium event in Reventon Triple Crown, after beating Kurt Dunham in the final game 6–2.

In 2019 Mifsud again won the Oceania Snooker Championship, regaining his Main Tour place for the 2019–20 and 2020–21 seasons.

== Performance and rankings timeline ==
Tournament	1991/ 92	1992/ 93	1993/ 94	1994/ 95	1998/ 99	2003/ 04	2004/ 05	2007/ 08	2011/ 12	2013/ 14	2014/ 15	2015/ 16	2019/ 20	2020/ 21
Ranking (Note: From the 2010/2011 season it shows the ranking at the beginning of the season.)	(Note: New players on the Main Tour don't have a ranking)	210	200	(Note: He was an amateur.)								93		98
Ranking tournaments
European Masters (Note: The event was called the European Open (1991/1992–1994/1995 and 2003/2004), Irish Open (1998/1999) and the Malta Cup (2004/2005 and 2007/2008))	LQ	1R	LQ	A	LQ	LQ	A	A	Tournament Not Held				A	A
UK Championship	LQ	LQ	LQ	A	LQ	LQ	A	LQ	A	A	A	A	A	A
Scottish Open (Note: The event was called the International Open (1992/1993–1994/1995 and 1998/1999) and the Players Championship (2003/2004))	NH	LQ	LQ	A	LQ	LQ	Tournament Not Held						A	A
World Grand Prix	Tournament Not Held										NR	DNQ	DNQ	DNQ
Welsh Open	LQ	LQ	LQ	A	LQ	LQ	A	LQ	A	A	A	A	A	A
Players Championship (Note: The event was called the Players Tour Championship Finals (2011/2012–2013/2014))	Tournament Not Held								DNQ	DNQ	DNQ	DNQ	DNQ	DNQ
Tour Championship	Tournament Not Held												DNQ	DNQ
World Championship	LQ	LQ	LQ	LQ	LQ	LQ	LQ	LQ	A	A	A	A	A	A
Non-ranking tournaments
The Masters	LQ	LQ	A	A	A	LQ	A	LQ	A	A	A	A	A	A
Former ranking tournaments
Classic	LQ	Tournament Not Held												
Strachan Open (Note: The event was called the Strachan Challenge (1992/1993–1993/1994))	LQ	MR	NR	Tournament Not Held										
Dubai Classic	LQ	LQ	LQ	A	Tournament Not Held									
Thailand Masters (Note: The event was called the Asian Open (1991/1992–1992/1993) and the Thailand Open (1993/1994–1994/1995))	LQ	LQ	LQ	A	LQ	Tournament Not Held								
British Open	LQ	LQ	LQ	A	LQ	LQ	A	Tournament Not Held						
Northern Ireland Trophy	Tournament Not Held							LQ	Tournament Not Held					
Australian Goldfields Open	Tournament Not Held								1R	WR	A	A	Not Held	
Shanghai Masters	Tournament Not Held							LQ	A	A	A	A	NR	NH
China Open (Note: The event was called the China International (1998/1999))	Tournament Not Held				LQ	A	A	LQ	A	A	A	A	Not Held	
China Championship	Tournament Not Held												LQ	NH
World Open (Note: The event was called the Grand Prix (1991/1992–1994/1995, 1998/1999, 2004/2005 and 2007/2008) and the LG Cup (2003/2004))	LQ	LQ	LQ	A	LQ	LQ	A	LQ	A	A	Not Held		A	NH

Performance Table Legend
LQ	lost in the qualifying draw	#R	lost in the early rounds of the tournament (WR = Wildcard round, RR = Round robin)	QF	lost in the quarter-finals
SF	lost in the semi-finals	F	lost in the final	W	won the tournament
DNQ	did not qualify for the tournament	A	did not participate in the tournament	WD	withdrew from the tournament
DQ	disqualified from the tournament				

NH / Not Held	event was not held.
NR / Non-Ranking Event	event is/was no longer a ranking event.
R / Ranking Event	event is/was a ranking event.
MR / Minor-Ranking Event	event is/was a minor-ranking event.

== Career finals ==
=== Amateur snooker finals: 37 (25 titles) ===
Outcome	No.	Year	Championship	Opponent in the final	Score
Winner	1.	1987	Australian Under-23 Championship	(Australia) Paul Balzer	5–3
Runner-up	1.	1987	Australian Under-18 Championship	(Australia) Len Hill	2–4
Runner-up	2.	1988	Australian Under-18 Championship	(Australia) Wayne Turpin	4–5
Winner	2.	1988	Australian Under-23 Championship	(Australia) Paul Balzer	5–3
Winner	3.	1989	Australian Under-21 Championship	(Australia) Philip Reilly	8–7
Winner	4.	1997	Australian Open Championship	(Australia) Stan Gorski	8–3
Runner-up	3.	1998	Australian Amateur Championship	(Australia) Shawn Budd	3–6
Winner	5.	1998	Oceania Championship	(Australia) Shawn Budd	8–5
Runner-up	4.	1999	Australian Open Championship	(Australia) Shawn Budd	4–8
Runner-up	5.	2000	Australian Amateur Championship	(Australia) Shawn Budd	2–5
Winner	6.	2000	Australian Open Championship	(Australia) Tony Kook	8–3
Winner	7.	2001	Australian Amateur Championship	(Australia) Neil Robertson	6–1
Winner	8.	2001	Australian Open Championship	(Australia) Paul Bunt	8–4
Winner	9.	2002	Australian Amateur Championship	(Australia) Quinten Hann	6–3
Winner	10.	2002	IBSF World Snooker Championship	(Wales) Tim English	11–6
Runner-up	6.	2002	Australian Open Championship	(Australia) Neil Robertson	0–8
Winner	11.	2003	Australian Amateur Championship	(Australia) Johl Younger	6–1
Winner	12.	2004	Australian Amateur Championship	(Australia) Shawn Budd	6–0
Runner-up	7.	2004	IBSF World Snooker Championship	(Northern Ireland) Mark Allen	6–11
Winner	13.	2006	Australian Open Championship	(New Zealand) Dene O'Kane	8–7
Runner-up	8.	2009	Australian Open Championship	(Australia) Shawn Budd	2–6
Winner	14.	2010	Australian Amateur Championship	(Australia) Shawn Budd	6–3
Winner	15.	2010	Australian Open Championship	(Australia) Vinnie Calabrese	6–5
Runner-up	9.	2011	Oceania Championship	(Australia) Joe Minici	4–6
Winner	16.	2011	Australian Amateur Championship	(Australia) Joe Minici	6–3
Winner	17.	2013	Australian Amateur Championship	(Australia) Johl Younger	5–4
Winner	18.	2013	Australian Open Championship	(Australia) Alan McCarthy	6–3
Winner	19.	2014	Oceania Championship	(Australia) Charlie Chafe	6–2
Runner-up	10.	2016	Australian Open Championship	(Australia) Roger Farebrother	0–6
Runner-up	11.	2017	Australian Amateur Championship	(Australia) Adrian Ridley	3–6
Runner-up	12.	2017	Australian Open Championship	(Australia) Ryan Thomerson	3–6
Winner	20.	2018	Australian Amateur Championship	(Australia) Charlie Chafe	6–5
Winner	21.	2019	Oceania Championship	(Australia) Kurt Dunham	6–4
Winner	22.	2022	Australian Open Championship	(Malaysia) Roger Farebrother	6–5
Winner	23.	2022	Australian National Championship	(Australia) James Mifsud	6–1
Winner	24.	2023	Australian National Championship	(Australia) Adrian Ridley	6–1
Winner	25.	2024	Australian National Championship	(Australia) Shaun Dalitz	6–4
