= Wuhan Gymnasium =

Sports venue in Wuhan, China

Coordinates: 30°34′36″N 114°15′36″E

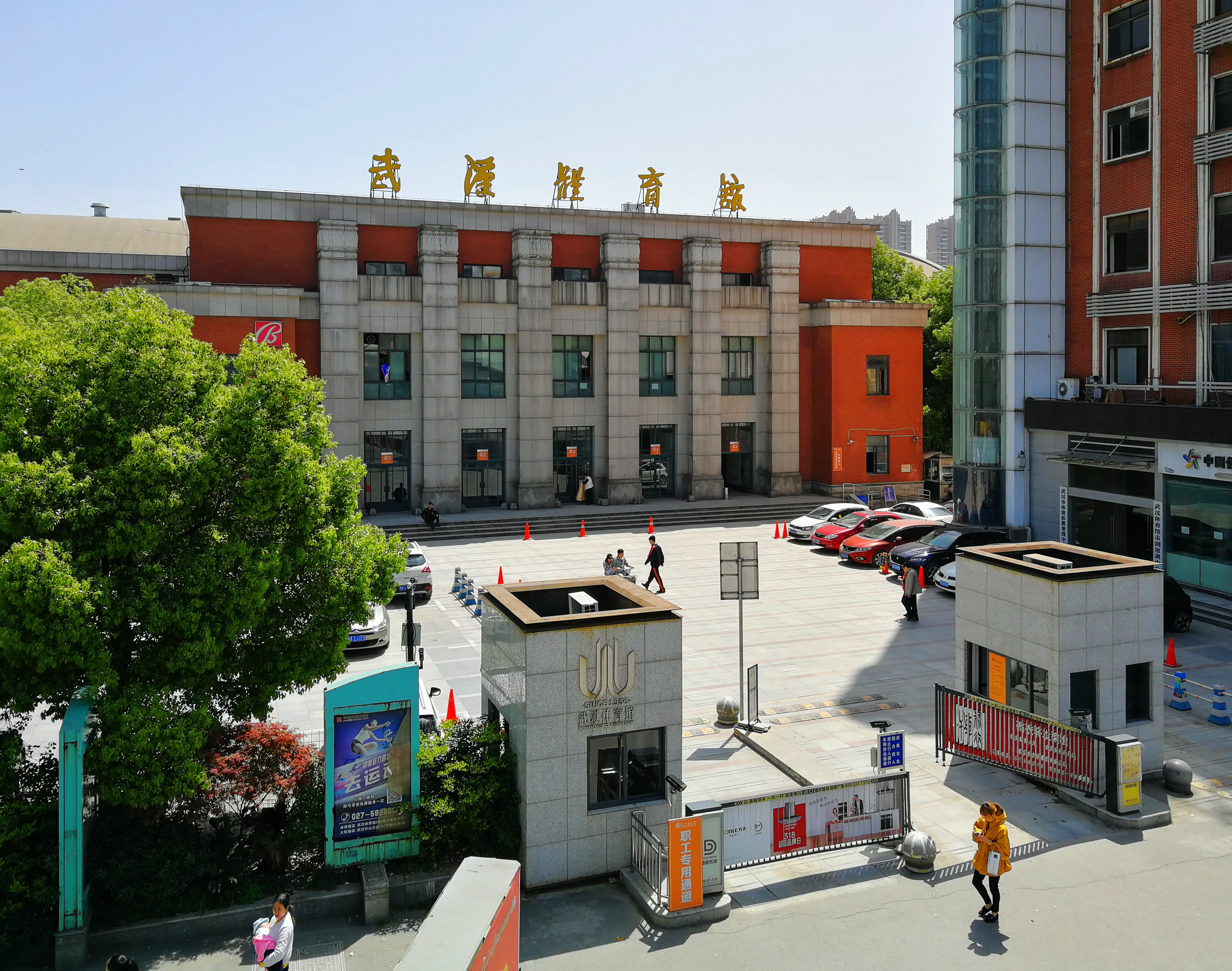
- Interactive map of Wuhan Gymnasium
- Full name: Wuhan Gymnasium
- Address: 612 Jiefang Avenue, Qiaokou District
- Location: Wuhan, China

Construction
- Built: 1956

Wuhan Gymnasium (Chinese: 武汉体育馆) is an indoor sporting arena in Wuhan, China. It hosted the taekwondo events of the 2019 Military World Games.
