= 2017 European Masters (snooker) =

2017 888sport European Masters

Tournament information
- Dates: 2–8 October 2017
- Venue: De Soeverein
- City: Lommel
- Country: Belgium
- Organisation: World Snooker
- Format: Ranking event
- Total prize fund: £366,500
- Winner's share: £75,000
- Highest break: Mark Allen (NIR) (145)

Final
- Champion: Judd Trump (ENG)
- Runner-up: Stuart Bingham (ENG)
- Score: 9–7

The 2017 European Masters (officially the 2007 888sport European Masters) was a professional ranking snooker tournament that took place from 2–8 October 2017 in Lommel, Belgium. It was the sixth ranking event of the 2017/2018 season. It was the first full ranking event to be held in Belgium since the European Open was played in Antwerp in 1994.

Qualifying took place from 3–4 August in Preston.

Judd Trump was the defending champion, having beaten Ronnie O'Sullivan 9–8 in the 2016 final in Bucharest, Romania. He successfully defended the title, defeating Stuart Bingham 9–7 in this year's final.

== Prize fund ==
The breakdown of prize money for this year is shown below:

- Winner: £75,000
- Runner-up: £35,000
- Semi-final: £17,500
- Quarter-final: £11,000
- Last 16: £6,000
- Last 32: £4,000
- Last 64: £2,000
- Televised highest break: £1,500
- Total: £366,500

The "rolling 147 prize" for a maximum break stood at £35,000

== Main draw ==
Last 64; Best of 7 frames
(England) Judd Trump	4
(England) Adam Duffy	1
(Wales) Jamie Jones	3
(England) Martin O'Donnell	4
(England) David Gilbert	4
(England) Sam Baird	1
(England) Mark King	2
(China) Chen Zifan	4
(China) Zhang Yong	0
(England) Ben Woollaston	4
(Northern Ireland) Gerard Greene	4
(England) Kyren Wilson	3
(China) Yuan Sijun	1
(Scotland) Alan McManus	4
(Iran) Hossein Vafaei	3
(Northern Ireland) Mark Allen	4
(Australia) Neil Robertson	4
(China) Fang Xiongman	0
(Wales) Dominic Dale	0
(England) Peter Ebdon	4
(Wales) Mark Williams	4
(China) Yan Bingtao	1
(England) Anthony Hamilton	w/d
(Scotland) Ross Muir	w/o
(India) Aditya Mehta	4
(England) Michael Holt	1
(England) Billy Joe Castle	4
(England) Martin Gould	3
(Thailand) Noppon Saengkham	3
(China) Cao Yupeng	4
(Wales) Jak Jones	2
(Republic of Ireland) Ken Doherty	4
(Scotland) John Higgins	4
(Switzerland) Alexander Ursenbacher	0
(England) Mark Davis	4
(England) Matthew Selt	1
(Scotland) Anthony McGill	4
(Northern Ireland) Joe Swail	3
(England) Alfie Burden	4
(Scotland) Eden Sharav	1
(China) Chen Zhe	1
(Thailand) Thepchaiya Un-Nooh	4
(England) Peter Lines	4
(Wales) Ryan Day	2
(England) Oliver Lines	1
(China) Zhou Yuelong	4
(Cyprus) Michael Georgiou	4
(England) John Astley	1
(England) Stuart Bingham	4
(England) Mitchell Mann	2
(Scotland) Graeme Dott	4
(Wales) Jamie Clarke	2
(China) Mei Xiwen	3
(England) Chris Wakelin	4
(Belgium) Luca Brecel	4
(Malaysia) Thor Chuan Leong	3
(Iran) Soheil Vahedi	w/d
(England) Joe Perry	w/o
(England) Jack Lisowski	4
(China) Li Yuan	1
(Wales) Ian Preece	2
(China) Lyu Haotian	4
(China) Zhao Xintong	1
(England) Mark Selby	4

Last 32; Best of 7 frames
(England) Judd Trump	4
(England) Martin O'Donnell	3
(England) David Gilbert	4
(China) Chen Zifan	1
(England) Ben Woollaston	4
(Northern Ireland) Gerard Greene	3
(Scotland) Alan McManus	1
(Northern Ireland) Mark Allen	4
(Australia) Neil Robertson	4
(England) Peter Ebdon	0
(Wales) Mark Williams	4
(Scotland) Ross Muir	3
(India) Aditya Mehta	3
(England) Billy Joe Castle	4
(China) Cao Yupeng	4
(Republic of Ireland) Ken Doherty	2
(Scotland) John Higgins	1
(England) Mark Davis	4
(Scotland) Anthony McGill	4
(England) Alfie Burden	0
(Thailand) Thepchaiya Un-Nooh	3
(England) Peter Lines	4
(China) Zhou Yuelong	4
(Cyprus) Michael Georgiou	0
(England) Stuart Bingham	4
(Scotland) Graeme Dott	0
(England) Chris Wakelin	1
(Belgium) Luca Brecel	4
(England) Joe Perry	2
(England) Jack Lisowski	4
(China) Lyu Haotian	3
(England) Mark Selby	4

Last 16; Best of 7 frames
(England) Judd Trump	4
(England) David Gilbert	2
(England) Ben Woollaston	2
(Northern Ireland) Mark Allen	4
(Australia) Neil Robertson	2
(Wales) Mark Williams	4
(England) Billy Joe Castle	3
(China) Cao Yupeng	4
(England) Mark Davis	3
(Scotland) Anthony McGill	4
(England) Peter Lines	1
(China) Zhou Yuelong	4
(England) Stuart Bingham	4
(Belgium) Luca Brecel	2
(England) Jack Lisowski	3
(England) Mark Selby	4

Quarter-finals; Best of 7 frames
(England) Judd Trump	4
(Northern Ireland) Mark Allen	3
(Wales) Mark Williams	2
(China) Cao Yupeng	4
(Scotland) Anthony McGill	0
(China) Zhou Yuelong	4
(England) Stuart Bingham	4
(England) Mark Selby	2

Semi-finals; Best of 11 frames
(England) Judd Trump	6
(China) Cao Yupeng	1
(China) Zhou Yuelong	4
(England) Stuart Bingham	6

Final; Best of 17 frames
(England) Judd Trump	9
(England) Stuart Bingham	7

== Final ==
Final: Best of 17 frames. Referee: Olivier Marteel. De Soeverein, Lommel, Belgium, 8 October 2017.
Judd Trump; England	9–7	Stuart Bingham; England
Afternoon: 13–63, 72–23, 0–81 (73), 94–1 (90), 20–107 (107), 2–107 (101), 78–0 (59), 71–47; Evening: 1–130 (130), 107–0 (107), 73–17 (66), 75–42, 0–69, 0–79 (78), 79–39 (66), 107–0 (107)
107	Highest break	130
2	Century breaks	3
6	50+ breaks	5

== Qualifying ==
These matches were held between 3 and 4 August 2017 at the Preston Guild Hall in Preston, England. All matches were best of 7 frames.

(England) Judd Trump	4–0 (Note: Match was held over and played in Belgium.)	(Scotland) Chris Totten
(England) Adam Duffy	4–2	(England) Liam Highfield
(Wales) Jamie Jones	4–2	(England) Christopher Keogan
(England) Martin O'Donnell	4–1	(England) Rory McLeod
(England) David Gilbert	4–2	(England) Nigel Bond
(England) Jimmy Robertson	3–4	(England) Sam Baird
(England) Mark King	4–2	(Norway) Kurt Maflin
(China) Chen Zifan	4–2	(England) Hammad Miah
(Finland) Robin Hull	2–4	(China) Zhang Yong
(England) Ben Woollaston	4–0	(England) Ian Burns
(England) Andrew Higginson	3–4	(Northern Ireland) Gerard Greene
(England) Kyren Wilson	4–0	(China) Xu Si
(China) Yuan Sijun	4–2	(England) Allan Taylor
(Scotland) Alan McManus	4–0	(Australia) Matthew Bolton
(England) Gary Wilson	3–4	(Iran) Hossein Vafaei
(Northern Ireland) Mark Allen	4–2	(Wales) Daniel Wells
(Australia) Neil Robertson	4–1	(England) Jamie Curtis-Barrett
(England) Rod Lawler	3–4	(China) Fang Xiongman
(Wales) Dominic Dale	w/o–w/d	(Thailand) Kritsanut Lertsattayathorn
(England) Peter Ebdon	4–3	(Thailand) Sunny Akani
(Wales) Mark Williams	w/o–w/d	(Pakistan) Hamza Akbar
(England) David Grace	1–4	(China) Yan Bingtao
(England) Anthony Hamilton	4–0	(Wales) David John
(Scotland) Ross Muir	4–2	(England) Sean O'Sullivan
(India) Aditya Mehta	4–2	(China) Wang Yuchen
(England) Michael Holt	4–0	(England) Paul Davison
(England) Billy Joe Castle	4–3	(England) Jimmy White
(England) Martin Gould	4–1	(Wales) Duane Jones
(China) Hu Hao	1–4	(Thailand) Noppon Saengkham
(England) Tom Ford	2–4	(China) Cao Yupeng
(Wales) Jak Jones	4–2	(Republic of Ireland) Fergal O'Brien
(England) Barry Hawkins	3–4	(Republic of Ireland) Ken Doherty

(Scotland) John Higgins	4–1	(China) Niu Zhuang
(China) Li Hang	1–4	(Switzerland) Alexander Ursenbacher
(England) Mark Davis	4–0	(Australia) Kurt Dunham
(Scotland) Rhys Clark	1–4	(England) Matthew Selt
(Scotland) Anthony McGill	4–2	(Wales) Matthew Stevens
(Thailand) James Wattana	1–4	(Northern Ireland) Joe Swail
(England) Ricky Walden	3–4	(England) Alfie Burden
(England) Elliot Slessor	1–4	(Scotland) Eden Sharav
(England) Stuart Carrington	3–4	(China) Chen Zhe
(Wales) Michael White	0–4	(Thailand) Thepchaiya Un-Nooh
(England) Peter Lines	4–0	(Malta) Alex Borg
(Wales) Ryan Day	4–3	(Germany) Lukas Kleckers
(Scotland) Scott Donaldson	3–4	(England) Oliver Lines
(China) Zhou Yuelong	4–3	(England) Robbie Williams
(Cyprus) Michael Georgiou	4–1	(China) Yu Delu
(England) Shaun Murphy	2–4	(England) John Astley
(England) Stuart Bingham	4–1	(China) Tian Pengfei
(Wales) Jackson Page	0–4	(England) Mitchell Mann
(Scotland) Graeme Dott	4–2	(England) Craig Steadman
(Wales) Jamie Clarke	4–3	(China) Xiao Guodong
(England) Ali Carter	1–4	(China) Mei Xiwen
(Republic of Ireland) Josh Boileau	1–4	(England) Chris Wakelin
(Belgium) Luca Brecel	4–3	(England) Sam Craigie
(England) Ashley Hugill	3–4	(Malaysia) Thor Chuan Leong
(Iran) Soheil Vahedi	4–0	(England) Mike Dunn
(England) Joe Perry	4–3	(Thailand) Boonyarit Keattikun
(England) Jack Lisowski	4–2	(China) Zhang Anda
(Scotland) Stephen Maguire	3–4	(China) Li Yuan
(Wales) Ian Preece	4–1	(England) Sanderson Lam
(England) Robert Milkins	2–4	(China) Lyu Haotian
(China) Zhao Xintong	4–0	(Wales) Lee Walker
(England) Mark Selby	4–3	(England) Mark Joyce

== Century breaks ==
=== Qualifying stage centuries ===
Total: 19

- 140 – Eden Sharav
- 130 – Jimmy Robertson
- 130 – Noppon Saengkham
- 127, 100 – Robert Milkins
- 119 – Anthony Hamilton
- 118 – Jack Lisowski
- 116 – Zhou Yuelong
- 112 – Ben Woollaston
- 111 – Martin Gould
- 110 – Thor Chuan Leong
- 107 – Michael Georgiou
- 106 – Neil Robertson
- 105 – Mark Davis
- 105 – Andrew Higginson
- 103 – Ryan Day
- 102 – Joe Perry
- 101 – Cao Yupeng
- 100 – Matthew Selt

=== Televised stage centuries ===
Total: 52

- 145, 141, 110, 102 – Mark Allen
- 143 – Martin Gould
- 138, 138, 136, 112, 101 – Zhou Yuelong
- 134, 129, 100 – Neil Robertson
- 131, 127, 120, 116, 111, 109 – Mark Selby
- 131, 109 – John Higgins
- 130, 119, 116, 113, 107, 102, 101 – Stuart Bingham
- 129 – Aditya Mehta
- 127 – Jack Lisowski
- 121, 116 – Ben Woollaston
- 115, 110, 107, 107, 106, 101, 100 – Judd Trump
- 113 – Alfie Burden
- 109 – Jamie Jones
- 108 – Mei Xiwen
- 105, 102, 101, 100 – David Gilbert
- 105 – Martin O'Donnell
- 103 – Mark Davis
- 102, 102, 101 – Mark Williams
- 102 – Thepchaiya Un-Nooh
