= Sunny Akani =

Thai professional snooker player

Personal information
- Nickname: The Sunshine Kid
- Born: 10 September 1995 (age 31) Bangkok, Thailand

Sport
- Country: Thailand
- Sport: Snooker
- Professional: 2015–2022, 2024–2026
- Highest ranking: 44 (March 2021)
- Best ranking finish: Quarter-final (x2)
Medal record
Men's snooker
Representing Thailand
Southeast Asian Games
Silver medal – second place	2023 Phnom Penh	Singles

Akani Songsermsawad (Thai: ซันนี่ อรรคนิธิ์ ส่งเสริมสวัสดิ์; born 10 September 1995), better known as Sunny Akani, is a Thai former professional snooker player.

== Career ==
=== Early career ===
Akani, a regular in amateur Thai snooker events since 2011, first came to international attention with a 5–2 win over professional Matthew Selt in the Six-red World Championship, in 2008.

=== 2015–2017 ===
In 2015 he won the ACBS Asian Under-21 Snooker Championship, beating Yuan Sijun 6–4 in the final and as a result was given a two-year card on the professional World Snooker Tour for the 2015–16 and 2016–17 seasons. His first appearance in a ranking event qualifier came at the 2016 World Championship, where he was edged out 10–9 by compatriot Thepchaiya Un-Nooh in the opening round.

Akani qualified for the 2016 Indian Open by defeating Ben Woollaston 4–3 and then saw off Jamie Burnett 4–1, Mark Davis 4–2 and Gary Wilson 4–2 (opened the match with a 104 break) to reach the quarter-finals of the first ranking he had appeared at. He took a 2–1 lead over Kyren Wilson, but would go on to lose 4–2. He also lost in the quarter-finals of the non-ranking Six-red World Championship 7–4 to Stuart Bingham. At the Northern Ireland Open, Akani eliminated Cao Yupeng 4–1 and Mark Davis 4–3 and was knocked out in the third round 4–2 by Wilson. He qualified for the German Masters by seeing off Graeme Dott and Jack Lisowski, but was thrashed 5–0 by Zhao Xintong in the first round. He stood one win away from playing in the World Championship after defeating Mei Xiwen 10–5 and Joe Perry 10–9, but was heavily beaten 10–3 by David Grace. Akani failed to break into the top 64 in the rankings during his two years on tour, but stayed on it by topping the one-year list.

=== 2017–2018 ===
In 2017, he started the season like the year before. He reached the Last 16 of the 2017 Indian Open after beating Scott Donaldson, Stephen Maguire, and Dominic Dale before losing 4–2 to Liam Highfield. At the 2017 World Open qualifying round, he had a close match against Liang Wenbo losing 5–4 after being 2–0 and 4–2 up and scoring back-to-back century breaks (101 and 119) but losing the "decider". At the 2017 International Championship, he was 2–0, 3–1 and 4–2 behind but he won the last 4 frames to beat Marco Fu by 6–4. In the last frame, he cleared the table with a break of 53 to win the frame by 2 points. After a walkover in the last 64, he lost against Martin O'Donnell 5–6, despite a lead of 5–2.

During the 2017 UK Championship, Akani defeated three higher seeds, defeating Fergal O'Brien 6–5, Michael Holt 6–4, and whitewashing former world championship runner-up Barry Hawkins 6–0. After the match, Hawkins said the match "was up there with one of the worst I have ever played". In the last 16, Akani drew Ronnie O'Sullivan and went ahead at scores of 2–0, 4–2 and 5–4, before losing the match 6–5. After the match O'Sullivan stated he believed Akani "deserved to win" and "felt like (he) robbed him of victory".

The following competition, the 2017 Scottish Open, saw Akani lose in the first round to Jimmy White 4–1.

=== 2018–2019 ===
Akani failed to qualify for the first ranking event of the season, losing 4–3 to Oliver Lines in the qualifying round of the 2018 Riga Masters. He beat Fan Zhengyi 6–5 to qualify for the 2018 World Open, where he was defeated 5–2 in the first round by Barry Hawkins. Akani reached the semi-finals of the non-ranking 2018 Haining Open, where he was defeated 4–2 by Li Hang. He followed this by the knockout stage of the non-ranking Six-red World Championship, coming through the round-robin stage by finishing second in Group E, scoring victories over Jimmy Robertson and Mohamed Khairy, and losing to group winner Ding Junhui. In the knockout stage, he beat Stephen Maguire and Mohammed Shehab 6–5 to reach the semi-finals, where he lost 7–5 to eventual champion Kyren Wilson.

Having failed to qualify for the Indian Open and European Masters, Akani's next ranking event was the 2018 China Championship, where he lost 5–3 in the first round to Mark Selby, who would go on to win the tournament. At the 2018 English Open, he defeated 8th seed Kyren Wilson 4–3 before losing 4–0 to Anthony McGill in the second round. Akani beat Soheil Vahedi 6–5 to qualify for the International Championship, where he defeated Mark Williams 6-3 and Zhou Yuelong 6–4 to reach the third round, where he lost 6–4 to Ali Carter. A 4–0 victory over Fan Zhengyi in first round of the 2018 Northern Ireland Open set up a second round tie with Xiao Guodong, which he lost 4–3.

Akani enjoyed another good showing at the 2018 UK Championship, defeating Eden Sharav and James Cahill 6–5, and winning 6–2 against Jak Jones to reach the last 16 for the second year running, where he lost 6–2 to Stuart Bingham. His next win at a ranking event came at the Shoot-Out, where he defeated Lyu Haotian and Billy Joe Castle before losing in the third round to amateur player Ryan Davies. Akani finished the season by failing to qualify for the 2019 World Championship, losing in the second round of qualifying 10–5 to Robert Milkins. He ended the season 52nd in the Snooker world rankings.

=== 2021–2022 ===
In July, Akani contracted COVID-19, although was not withdrawn from any events. However, in an interview after losing in the 2022 European Masters, he revealed that he had Long COVID and was unable to practise for more than minutes, where normally he would be on the snooker table as much as he was able to be on it. This led to a significant dip in form throughout the 2021-22 season, which led to his eventual relegation from the tour.

=== 2024 ===
Akani reclaimed professional status by reaching the final of Event 1 of the Asia and Oceania Q School. Results in most tournaments did not go his way during the two years he was on tour, and he was relegated at the conclusion of the 2025-26 snooker season, finishing at a ranking of 78.

== Style of play ==
Akani is known for his very deliberate cue action, where he plants his hand down with the cue before playing the next shot. In the book 147 Snooker Drills and Exercises by Andrew Highfield, he named a challenge after Akani, after challenging him to complete the drill. He is also known for resting his chin on the cue extension when playing with a rest.

== Personal life ==
Other than playing professional snooker, Akani also produces snooker cues and rests under his name. Ronnie O'Sullivan has been using cues made by him since 2025. On August 15 of that same year O’Sullivan used an Akani cue to make two maximum 147 breaks in his Saudi Arabia Masters semi-final match against Chris Wakelin.

== Performance and rankings timeline ==
Tournament	2008/ 09	2015/ 16	2016/ 17	2017/ 18	2018/ 19	2019/ 20	2020/ 21	2021/ 22	2022/ 23	2024/ 25	2025/ 26
Ranking (Note: It shows the ranking at the beginning of the season)	(Note: He was an amateur)	(Note: New players on the Main Tour don't have a ranking)	91	(Note: Players qualified One Year Ranking List started the season without ranking points)	66	52	52	57			70
Ranking tournaments
Championship League	Non-Ranking Event						RR	RR	A	A	A
Saudi Arabia Masters	Tournament Not Held									2R	2R
Wuhan Open	Tournament Not Held									1R	LQ
English Open	Not Held		2R	3R	2R	2R	2R	2R	A	A	1R
British Open	Tournament Not Held							1R	A	2R	1R
Xi'an Grand Prix	Tournament Not Held									2R	1R
Northern Ireland Open	Not Held		3R	3R	2R	1R	2R	1R	A	A	LQ
International Championship	NH	A	1R	2R	3R	1R	Not Held			LQ	LQ
UK Championship	A	A	1R	4R	4R	2R	2R	2R	A	LQ	LQ
Shoot Out	NH	NR	2R	QF	3R	3R	3R	1R	A	A	A
Scottish Open	Not Held		2R	1R	1R	1R	3R	1R	A	A	A
German Masters	NH	A	1R	LQ	LQ	2R	LQ	LQ	A	LQ	LQ
World Grand Prix	NH	DNQ	DNQ	DNQ	DNQ	DNQ	DNQ	DNQ	DNQ	DNQ	DNQ
Players Championship (Note: The event was called the Players Tour Championship Grand Final (2015/2016))	NH	DNQ	DNQ	DNQ	DNQ	DNQ	DNQ	DNQ	DNQ	DNQ	DNQ
Welsh Open	A	A	1R	3R	1R	1R	2R	LQ	A	A	LQ
World Open	A	NH	LQ	LQ	1R	3R	Not Held			1R	A
Tour Championship	Tournament Not Held				DNQ	DNQ	DNQ	DNQ	DNQ	DNQ	DNQ
World Championship	A	LQ	LQ	LQ	LQ	LQ	LQ	LQ	A	LQ	A
Former ranking tournaments
Shanghai Masters	A	A	LQ	2R	Non-Ranking		Not Held			Non-Ranking	
Indian Open	Not Held		QF	3R	LQ	Tournament Not Held					
China Open	A	A	LQ	LQ	LQ	Tournament Not Held					
Riga Masters (Note: The event was called the Riga Open (2015/2016))	NH	MR	LQ	A	LQ	A	Tournament Not Held				
China Championship	Not Held		NR	A	1R	1R	Tournament Not Held				
WST Pro Series	Tournament Not Held						2R	Tournament Not Held			
Turkish Masters	Tournament Not Held							LQ	Not Held		
Gibraltar Open	NH	MR	A	A	A	A	2R	A	Not Held		
European Masters	Not Held		LQ	LQ	LQ	LQ	1R	3R	A	Not Held	
Former non-ranking tournaments
Haining Open	A	MR	A	A	SF	A	NH	A	A	Not Held	
Six-red World Championship (Note: The event was called the Six-red Snooker International (2008/2009))	RR	RR	QF	2R	SF	RR	Not Held		RR	Not Held	

Performance Table Legend
LQ	lost in the qualifying draw	#R	lost in the early rounds of the tournament (WR = Wildcard round, RR = Round robin)	QF	lost in the quarter-finals
SF	lost in the semi-finals	F	lost in the final	W	won the tournament
DNQ	did not qualify for the tournament	A	did not participate in the tournament	WD	withdrew from the tournament

NH / Not Held	means an event was not held.
NR / Non-Ranking Event	means an event is/was no longer a ranking event.
R / Ranking Event	means an event is/was a ranking event.
MR / Minor-Ranking Event	means an event is/was a minor-ranking event.
PA / Pro-am Event	means an event is/was a pro-am event.

== Career finals ==
=== Pro-am finals: 1 ===
Outcome	No.	Year	Championship	Opponent in the final	Score
Runner-up	1.	2023	Southeast Asian Games	(Malaysia) Thor Chuan Leong	1–4

=== Amateur finals: 1 (1 title) ===
Outcome	No.	Year	Championship	Opponent in the final	Score
Winner	1.	2015	Asian Under-21 Championship	(China) Yuan Sijun	6–4
