= 2018 English Open (snooker) =

2018 BetVictor English Open

Tournament information
- Dates: 15–21 October 2018
- Venue: K2 Leisure Centre
- City: Crawley
- Country: England
- Organisation: World Snooker
- Format: Ranking event
- Total prize fund: £366,000
- Winner's share: £70,000
- Highest break: Ronnie O'Sullivan (ENG) (147); Thepchaiya Un-Nooh (THA) (147)

Final
- Champion: Stuart Bingham (ENG)
- Runner-up: Mark Davis (ENG)
- Score: 9–7

The 2018 English Open (officially the 2018 BetVictor English Open) was a professional ranking snooker tournament, that took place from 15 to 21 October 2018 in Crawley, West Sussex, England. It was the sixth ranking event of the 2018/2019 season and a part of the Home Nations Series.

The defending champion was Ronnie O'Sullivan, who defeated Kyren Wilson in the 2017 event. However, O'Sullivan would lose to Mark Davis 1–6 in the semi-final. O'Sullivan was highly critical of the venue stating "The worst part was not the smell of urine..."This is about as bad as I've ever seen. It's a bit of a hellhole....I don't know what this gaff is, but I've just done an interview and all I can smell is urine."

Stuart Bingham won his fifth professional ranking title with a 9–7 victory against Mark Davis, who had reached his first ever ranking final at the age of 46, playing in his 28th season on the professional tour. Bingham became the first player to win two Home Nations Series events.

Thepchaiya Un-Nooh made the second maximum break of his career in the opening frame of his 4–1 first round win against Soheil Vahedi. On the following day Ronnie O'Sullivan made the 15th maximum break of his career in the final frame of the second round whitewash of Allan Taylor. This was the fourth time that two maximums were made at the main stage of a ranking tournament, and the third time in just over half a year.

== Prize fund ==
The breakdown of prize money for this year is shown below:

- Winner: £70,000
- Runner-up: £30,000
- Semi-final: £20,000
- Quarter-final: £10,000
- Last 16: £6,000
- Last 32: £3,500
- Last 64: £2,500
- Highest break: £2,000
- Total: £366,000

The "rolling 147 prize" for a maximum break: £15,000

== Tournament draw ==
=== Top half ===
==== Section 1 ====
Last 128; Best of 7 frames
(England) Ronnie O'Sullivan (1)	4
(Norway) Kurt Maflin	1
(Scotland) Scott Donaldson	3
(England) Allan Taylor	4
(England) Jimmy White	4
(China) Lyu Haotian	2
(Wales) Matthew Stevens	4
(China) Chen Zifan	1
(China) Liang Wenbo (16)	4
(England) Gary Wilson	0
(Scotland) Eden Sharav	4
(Cyprus) Michael Georgiou	3
(England) Craig Steadman	4
(Northern Ireland) Joe Swail	1
(Republic of Ireland) Ken Doherty	0
(England) Chris Wakelin	4

Last 64; Best of 7 frames
(England) Ronnie O'Sullivan (1)	4
(England) Allan Taylor	0
(England) Jimmy White	0
(Wales) Matthew Stevens	4
(China) Liang Wenbo (16)	2
(Scotland) Eden Sharav	4
(England) Craig Steadman	4
(England) Chris Wakelin	1

Last 32; Best of 7 frames
(England) Ronnie O'Sullivan (1)	4
(Wales) Matthew Stevens	1
(Scotland) Eden Sharav	4
(England) Craig Steadman	0

Last 16; Best of 7 frames
(England) Ronnie O'Sullivan (1)	4
(Scotland) Eden Sharav	1

==== Section 2 ====
Last 128; Best of 7 frames
(England) David Lilley	4
(England) Tom Ford	2
(Scotland) Alan McManus	4
(China) Fan Zhengyi	0
(England) Oliver Lines	4
(England) Joe O'Connor	3
(Australia) Neil Robertson (9)	4
(Scotland) Ross Muir	2
(England) Martin O'Donnell	2
(England) Stuart Carrington	4
(England) Adam Duffy	3
(China) Luo Honghao	4
(Scotland) Anthony McGill	4
(Germany) Simon Lichtenberg	0
(England) Kyren Wilson (8)	3
(Thailand) Sunny Akani	4

Last 64; Best of 7 frames
(England) David Lilley	0
(Scotland) Alan McManus	4
(England) Oliver Lines	2
(Australia) Neil Robertson (9)	4
(England) Stuart Carrington	1
(China) Luo Honghao	4
(Scotland) Anthony McGill	4
(Thailand) Sunny Akani	0

Last 32; Best of 7 frames
(Scotland) Alan McManus	1
(Australia) Neil Robertson (9)	4
(China) Luo Honghao	4
(Scotland) Anthony McGill	2

Last 16; Best of 7 frames
(Australia) Neil Robertson (9)	2
(China) Luo Honghao	4

==== Section 3 ====
Last 128; Best of 7 frames
(England) Judd Trump (5)	4
(Finland) Robin Hull	1
(China) Zhao Xintong	4
(Republic of Ireland) Michael Judge	3
(China) Li Hang	0
(England) Ian Burns	4
(Republic of Ireland) Fergal O'Brien	2
(England) Jack Lisowski	4
(Wales) Ryan Day (12)	4
(England) Ashley Hugill	0
(China) Zhang Yong	4
(China) Chen Feilong	3
(England) Ashley Carty	3
(England) Mark King	4
(England) Alfie Burden	0
(England) Peter Ebdon	4

Last 64; Best of 7 frames
(England) Judd Trump (5)	4
(China) Zhao Xintong	3
(England) Ian Burns	3
(England) Jack Lisowski	4
(Wales) Ryan Day (12)	4
(China) Zhang Yong	0
(England) Mark King	4
(England) Peter Ebdon	3

Last 32; Best of 7 frames
(England) Judd Trump (5)	4
(England) Jack Lisowski	2
(Wales) Ryan Day (12)	4
(England) Mark King	2

Last 16; Best of 7 frames
(England) Judd Trump (5)	2
(Wales) Ryan Day (12)	4

==== Section 4 ====
Last 128; Best of 7 frames
(England) Robbie Williams	1
(England) Mark Davis	4
(Wales) Jamie Clarke	1
(Poland) Adam Stefanow	4
(China) Mei Xiwen	4
(Thailand) James Wattana	3
(Hong Kong) Marco Fu (13)	4
(England) Mark Joyce	1
(England) Luke Simmonds	0
(China) Zhang Jiankang	4
(England) Martin Gould	4
(England) Billy Joe Castle	2
(China) Tian Pengfei	3
(England) Nigel Bond	4
(Scotland) John Higgins (4)	4
(China) Li Yuan	1

Last 64; Best of 7 frames
(England) Mark Davis	4
(Poland) Adam Stefanow	0
(China) Mei Xiwen	4
(Hong Kong) Marco Fu (13)	1
(China) Zhang Jiankang	2
(England) Martin Gould	4
(England) Nigel Bond	1
(Scotland) John Higgins (4)	4

Last 32; Best of 7 frames
(England) Mark Davis	4
(China) Mei Xiwen	2
(England) Martin Gould	1
(Scotland) John Higgins (4)	4

Last 16; Best of 7 frames
(England) Mark Davis	4
(Scotland) John Higgins (4)	2

=== Bottom half ===
==== Section 5 ====
Last 128; Best of 7 frames
(England) Mark Selby (3)	4
(England) Sanderson Lam	0
(England) Ben Woollaston	4
(Scotland) Graeme Dott	2
(England) John Astley	1
(Germany) Lukas Kleckers	4
(England) Ricky Walden	4
(England) Hammad Miah	2
(England) Stuart Bingham (14)	4
(Wales) Duane Jones	0
(Wales) Michael White	3
(Iran) Hossein Vafaei	4
(Iran) Soheil Vahedi	1
(Thailand) Thepchaiya Un-Nooh	4
(Malaysia) Thor Chuan Leong	4
(Pakistan) Hamza Akbar	1

Last 64; Best of 7 frames
(England) Mark Selby (3)	3
(England) Ben Woollaston	4
(Germany) Lukas Kleckers	0
(England) Ricky Walden	4
(England) Stuart Bingham (14)	4
(Iran) Hossein Vafaei	0
(Thailand) Thepchaiya Un-Nooh	4
(Malaysia) Thor Chuan Leong	3

Last 32; Best of 7 frames
(England) Ben Woollaston	3
(England) Ricky Walden	4
(England) Stuart Bingham (14)	4
(Thailand) Thepchaiya Un-Nooh	3

Last 16; Best of 7 frames
(England) Ricky Walden	0
(England) Stuart Bingham (13)	4

==== Section 6 ====
Last 128; Best of 7 frames
(China) Zhang Anda	3
(England) Matthew Selt	4
(England) Sam Baird	4
(England) Liam Highfield	2
(England) Ali Carter	4
(England) Rory McLeod	2
(Belgium) Luca Brecel (11)	4
(China) Niu Zhuang	0
(Wales) Lee Walker	4
(Wales) Jak Jones	3
(England) Joe Perry	2
(Wales) Daniel Wells	4
(England) Rod Lawler	0
(England) Sam Craigie	4
(England) Barry Hawkins (6)	4
(England) Peter Lines	0

Last 64; Best of 7 frames
(England) Matthew Selt	4
(England) Sam Baird	0
(England) Ali Carter	4
(Belgium) Luca Brecel (11)	1
(Wales) Lee Walker	3
(Wales) Daniel Wells	4
(England) Sam Craigie	3
(England) Barry Hawkins (6)	4

Last 32; Best of 7 frames
(England) Matthew Selt	1
(England) Ali Carter	4
(Wales) Daniel Wells	4
(England) Barry Hawkins (6)	3

Last 16; Best of 7 frames
(England) Ali Carter	4
(Wales) Daniel Wells	3

==== Section 7 ====
Last 128; Best of 7 frames
(England) Shaun Murphy (7)	4
(England) Mike Dunn	1
(Northern Ireland) Gerard Greene	3
(England) David Gilbert	4
(China) Lu Ning	2
(England) Robert Milkins	4
(England) Elliot Slessor	4
(England) Sean O'Sullivan	2
(Northern Ireland) Mark Allen (10)	4
(England) Anthony Hamilton	2
(England) Farakh Ajaib	1
(China) Yuan Sijun	4
(England) Harvey Chandler	1
(Thailand) Noppon Saengkham	4
(China) Xiao Guodong	2
(England) Steven Hallworth	4

Last 64; Best of 7 frames
(England) Shaun Murphy (7)	4
(England) David Gilbert	2
(England) Robert Milkins	4
(England) Elliot Slessor	3
(Northern Ireland) Mark Allen (10)	3
(China) Yuan Sijun	4
(Thailand) Noppon Saengkham	4
(England) Steven Hallworth	2

Last 32; Best of 7 frames
(England) Shaun Murphy (7)	1
(England) Robert Milkins	4
(China) Yuan Sijun	1
(Thailand) Noppon Saengkham	4

Last 16; Best of 7 frames
(England) Robert Milkins	3
(Thailand) Noppon Saengkham	4

==== Section 8 ====
Last 128; Best of 7 frames
(England) Andrew Higginson	2
(Northern Ireland) Jordan Brown	4
(England) Jimmy Robertson	4
(England) Michael Holt	1
(Hong Kong) Andy Lee	2
(China) Yan Bingtao	4
(Scotland) Stephen Maguire (15)	4
(England) James Cahill	3
(England) Paul Davison	3
(China) Zhou Yuelong	4
(China) Xu Si	4
(Scotland) Chris Totten	2
(Switzerland) Alexander Ursenbacher	4
(Wales) Kishan Hirani	1
(Wales) Mark Williams (2)	4
(Wales) Dominic Dale	1

Last 64; Best of 7 frames
(Northern Ireland) Jordan Brown	4
(England) Jimmy Robertson	3
(China) Yan Bingtao	2
(Scotland) Stephen Maguire (15)	4
(China) Zhou Yuelong	4
(China) Xu Si	2
(Switzerland) Alexander Ursenbacher	0
(Wales) Mark Williams (2)	4

Last 32; Best of 7 frames
(Northern Ireland) Jordan Brown	2
(Scotland) Stephen Maguire (15)	4
(China) Zhou Yuelong	4
(Wales) Mark Williams (2)	3

Last 16; Best of 7 frames
(Scotland) Stephen Maguire (15)	4
(China) Zhou Yuelong	0

=== Finals ===
Quarter-finals; Best of 9 frames
(England) Ronnie O'Sullivan (1)	5
(China) Luo Honghao	3
(Wales) Ryan Day (12)	1
(England) Mark Davis	5
(England) Stuart Bingham (13)	5
(England) Ali Carter	2
(Thailand) Noppon Saengkham	3
(Scotland) Stephen Maguire (15)	5

Semi-finals; Best of 11 frames
(England) Ronnie O'Sullivan (1)	1
(England) Mark Davis	6
(England) Stuart Bingham (13)	6
(Scotland) Stephen Maguire (15)	3

Final; Best of 17 frames
(England) Mark Davis	7
(England) Stuart Bingham (13)	9

== Final ==
Final: Best of 17 frames. Referee: Ben Williams. K2 Leisure Centre, Crawley, England, 21 October 2018.
Mark Davis; England	7–9	Stuart Bingham (13); England
Afternoon: 76–53, 0–75, 41–65, 55–12, 17–64, 72–0, 0–77, 136–0 (136); Evening: 94–44, 40–82, 0–73, 84–42, 88–48, 0–82, 0–102 (102), 20–59
136	Highest break	102
1	Century breaks	1

== Century breaks ==
Total: 81

- 147, 135, 118, 104 – Ronnie O'Sullivan
- 147, 112 – Thepchaiya Un-Nooh
- 141, 136, 132, 121, 105 – Ryan Day
- 140 – Zhou Yuelong
- 138, 131, 109, 102 – Stuart Bingham
- 137 – Marco Fu
- 136, 136, 107, 104, 102 – Mark Davis
- 136, 128, 100 – Luo Honghao
- 136, 116, 100 – Tian Pengfei
- 135 – Elliot Slessor
- 133 – Sunny Akani
- 131, 101 – Ben Woollaston
- 129, 101 – Sam Craigie
- 129 – Mike Dunn
- 126, 109, 108, 107, 104 – Judd Trump
- 122 – Jak Jones
- 121, 106, 106 – Barry Hawkins
- 121 – Ashley Carty
- 121 – Allan Taylor
- 120, 100 – Sam Baird
- 116, 109 – Mark Williams
- 116, 103 – Ali Carter
- 116 – Robert Milkins
- 115 – Thor Chuan Leong
- 114, 102, 100, 100 – Noppon Saengkham
- 113 – Liam Highfield
- 113 – Zhang Anda
- 112, 102, 100 – Neil Robertson
- 112 – Liang Wenbo
- 109, 109 – Martin Gould
- 109 – Luca Brecel
- 108, 101 – David Gilbert
- 108 – Paul Davison
- 107 – Anthony McGill
- 106, 100 – Mark Selby
- 105 – Ricky Walden
- 105 – John Higgins
- 104 – Stuart Carrington
- 102 – Yan Bingtao
- 102 – Stephen Maguire
- 102 – Mei Xiwen
- 101 – Matthew Selt
- 100 – Jack Lisowski
