= 2019 Scottish Open (snooker) =

Snooker tournament

2019 19.com Scottish Open
Tournament information
- Dates: 9–15 December 2019
- Venue: Emirates Arena
- City: Glasgow
- Country: Scotland
- Organisation: World Snooker
- Format: Ranking event
- Total prize fund: £405,000
- Winner's share: £70,000
- Highest break: Jack Lisowski (ENG) (143)

Final
- Champion: Mark Selby (ENG)
- Runner-up: Jack Lisowski (ENG)
- Score: 9–6

The 2019 Scottish Open (officially the 2019 19.com Scottish Open) was a professional snooker tournament, which took place from 9 to 15 December 2019 at the Emirates Arena in Glasgow, Scotland. It was the eighth ranking event of the 2019–20 snooker season and the third tournament of the Home Nations Series. The event featured a prize fund of £405,000, with the winner receiving £70,000, and was sponsored by sports bookmakers 19.com. The tournament was broadcast across Europe on Eurosport.

The defending champion was Mark Allen who completed a 9–7 defeat of Shaun Murphy in the 2018 final, but he lost 5–6 to Jack Lisowski in the semi-finals. The final was contested between Mark Selby and Lisowski. Selby claimed his 17th ranking title and became the first player to win two Home Nations events in a single season after a 9–6 victory over Lisowski in the final. Lisowski made the highest break of the event, a 143, in frame three of his quarter-final win over Thepchaiya Un-Nooh.

== Format ==
The Scottish Open was first played in 1981 as the 1981 International Open, which was won by Steve Davis. The event was added to the Home Nations Series in 2016. The 2019 edition was the third of four Home Nations Series tournaments, and the eighth world ranking event of the 2019–20 snooker season. The event took place from 9 to 15 December 2019 at the Emirates Arena in Glasgow, Scotland. It followed the UK Championship, and preceded the European Masters.

The defending champion was Mark Allen, who had won the 2018 event by defeating Shaun Murphy 9–7. All matches were played as the best of 7 frames in the first four rounds, at which point the number increased: 9 in the quarter-finals; 11 in the semi-finals; and the best of 19 frames in the final. Chinese sports prediction website 19.com sponsored the event, which was broadcast in Europe by Eurosport; Quest in the United Kingdom and Northern Ireland; NowTV in Hong Kong; Superstars Online, Youku and Zhibo.tv in China; DAZN in Canada and Sky Sport in New Zealand.

=== Prize fund ===
The winner of the event received £70,000 of a total prize fund of £405,000. A breakdown of the prize money for the event is shown below:

- Winner: £70,000
- Runner-up: £30,000
- Semi-final: £20,000
- Quarter-final: £10,000
- Last 16: £7,500
- Last 32: £4,000
- Last 64: £3,000
- Highest break: £5,000
- Total: £405,000

== Summary ==
The first four rounds were played between 9 and 12 December as the best-of-7 frame matches. Defending champion Mark Allen defeated Andy Hicks 4–2 and then Louis Heathcote, Elliot Slessor and Chris Wakelin all 4–1. He would play 25th seed Scott Donaldson, who defeated Lei Peifan, Billy Joe Castle, eighth seed Kyren Wilson, and Zhang Jiankang all by four frames to two. Twelfth seed Jack Lisowski overcame Zhang Anda, David Grace, Mike Dunn, and fifth seed John Higgins to reach the last eight stage. He met Thepchaiya Un-Nooh, who beat Liang Wenbo, Robert Milkins, Marco Fu, before whitewashing fourth seed Neil Robertson 4–0. Third seed Ronnie O'Sullivan defeated Dominic Dale on a deciding frame, before completing whitewashes over James Cahill and Martin Gould, and reaching the quarter-finals with a 4–2 win over Joe Perry. Sixth seed Mark Selby won in the first round over Mark Joyce and Alfie Burden before completing 4–0 whitewashes of his own over Liam Highfield and Jimmy Robertson. The final quarter-final was to be played between David Gilbert – who completed victories over Eden Sharav, Chang Bingyu, Xiao Guodong and Shaun Murphy – and second seed Judd Trump, who completed 4–0 victories over Amine Amiri and Yuan Sijun before 4–1 defeating James Wattana and Graeme Dott.

The quarter-finals of the event were played on 13 December as the best of nine frame matches. Allen defeated Donaldson 5–1, making four breaks over 50. O'Sullivan led Selby 4–3, with four century breaks being made between them in the opening five frames. Selby made a break of 56 to force a deciding frame, which he won with a break of 63. Gilbert lost the opening frame against Trump, but won the next three with breaks of 71 and 98. Trump won frame five with a break of 101, but Gilbert won the next two frames to progress after a 5–2 victory. The final quarter-final was played between Lisowski and Un-Nooh. Lisowski made breaks of 63, 76, 78, 71 and the tournament high break of 143 to win the match 5–3. The match was described by Lisowski as "probably the best game I’ve ever been involved in as a professional".

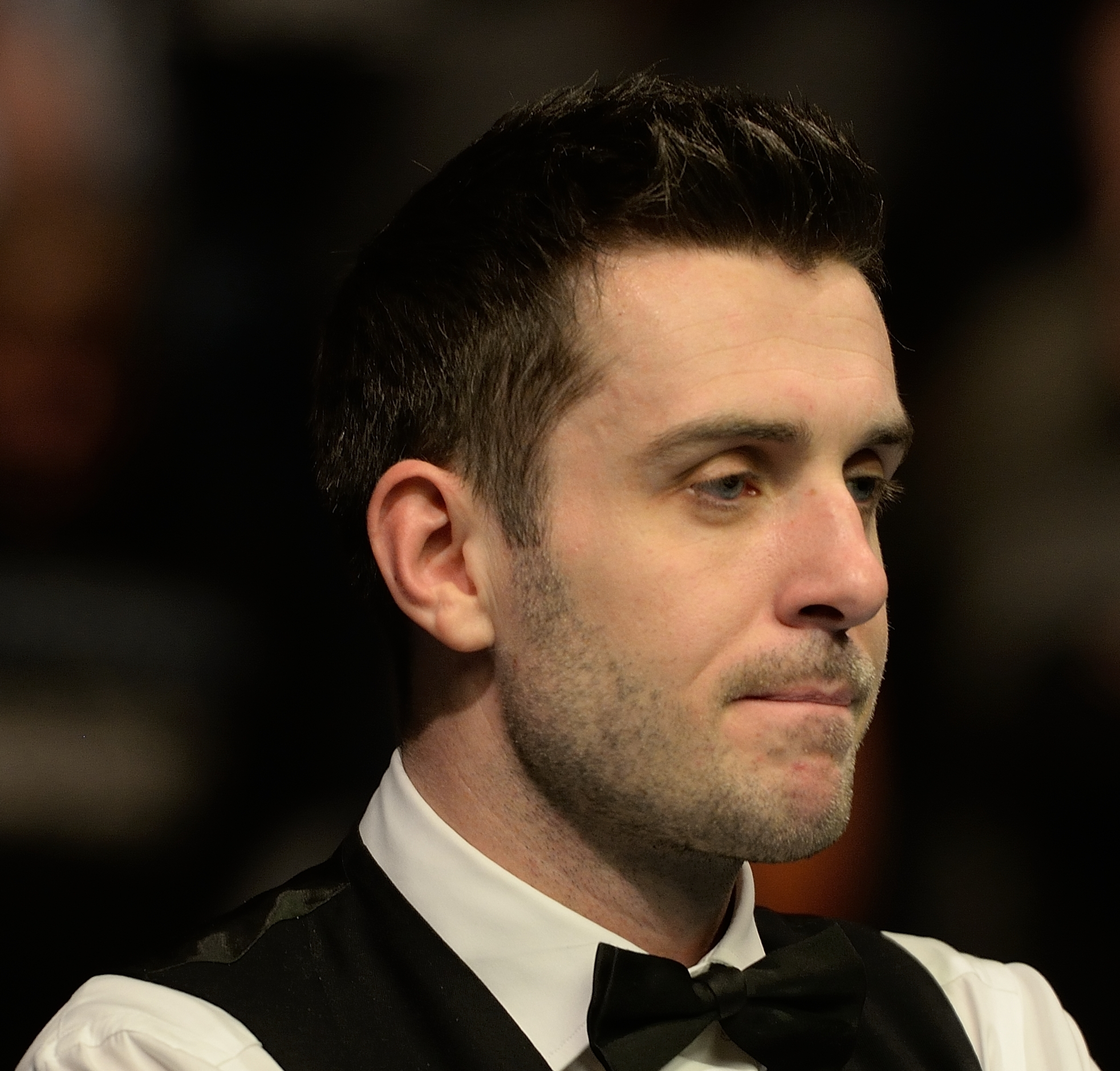
Mark Selby won the event, defeating Jack Lisowski in the final 9–6

The semi-finals were held on 14 December as the best of 11 frames. Selby defeated Gilbert by six frames to one, with breaks of 76, 84, 132 and 69. Allen and Lisowski in the second semi-final were tied at 2–2, before Allen won frame five with a break of 79. Lisowski won the next three frames, including a 74 in frame 8 which was described by Eurosport pundit Neal Foulds as "good a break as we have seen all year". Allen, however won the next two frames to force a deciding frame, which was won by Lisowski, with a 95 break.

The final was contested between Selby and Lisowski on 15 December as the best of 17 frames, held over two sessions. The pair had met on the world snooker tour on seven previous occasions, with Liwowski having won four of their encounters. Lisowski made a pot on his first shot of the game, and won the first two frames with breaks of 73 and 58. Selby tied the scores at 2–2 with breaks of 78 and 75. Lisowski took frame five, before Selby won frame six with a break of 127, and led at 5–3 after winning the next two frames. On the resumption of the match, Lisowski won two of the next three frames before Selby took frame 12 after a prolonged safety battle. The next frame was won by Selby, who led 8–5, one frame from victory, but lost frame 14 despite being 64 points ahead. Selby, however, won the match 9–6 in frame 15 after a break of 79. After the victory, Selby commented that after losing to Matthew Stevens in the UK Championship, he had thought about retiring from the event. This was Selby's second Home Nations victory of the season and his 17th career ranking title.

== Tournament draw ==
Below is the full results for the events. Players in bold denote match winners, whilst numbers in brackets show seedings.

=== Top half ===
==== Section 1 ====
Last 128; Best of 7 frames
**Mark Allen (NIR) (1)**	**4**
Andy Hicks (ENG)	2
Anthony Hamilton (ENG)	1
**Louis Heathcote (ENG)**	**4**
**Anthony McGill (SCO) (32)**	**4**
Hammad Miah (ENG)	2
Gerard Greene (NIR)	2
**Elliot Slessor (ENG)**	**4**
**Ali Carter (ENG) (16)**	**4**
Fan Zhengyi (CHN)	3
Riley Parsons (ENG)	3
**Lu Ning (CHN)**	**4**
**Gary Wilson (ENG) (17)**	**4**
Rod Lawler (ENG)	0
Robbie Williams (ENG)	3
**Chris Wakelin (ENG)**	**4**

Last 64; Best of 7 frames
**Mark Allen (NIR) (1)**	**4**
Louis Heathcote (ENG)	1
Anthony McGill (SCO) (32)	2
**Elliot Slessor (ENG)**	**4**
Ali Carter (ENG) (16)	3
**Lu Ning (CHN)**	**4**
Gary Wilson (ENG) (17)	1
**Chris Wakelin (ENG)**	**4**

Last 32; Best of 7 frames
**Mark Allen (NIR) (1)**	**4**
Elliot Slessor (ENG)	1
Lu Ning (CHN)	0
**Chris Wakelin (ENG)**	**4**

Last 16; Best of 7 frames
**Mark Allen (NIR) (1)**	**4**
Chris Wakelin (ENG)	1

==== Section 2 ====
Last 128; Best of 7 frames
Jak Jones (WAL)	1
**Mark King (ENG)**	**4**
**Tom Ford (ENG) (24)**	**4**
Lee Walker (WAL)	1
Chen Feilong (CHN)	3
**Zhang Jiankang (CHN)**	**4**
Barry Hawkins (ENG) (9)	0
**John Astley (ENG)**	**4**
**Billy Joe Castle (ENG)**	**4**
Ashley Carty (ENG)	2
**Scott Donaldson (SCO) (25)**	**4**
Lei Peifan (CHN)	2
Simon Lichtenberg (GER)	2
**Peter Lines (ENG)**	**4**
**Kyren Wilson (ENG) (8)**	**4**
Hossein Vafaei (IRN)	3

Last 64; Best of 7 frames
Mark King (ENG)	2
**Tom Ford (ENG) (24)**	**4**
**Zhang Jiankang (CHN)**	**4**
John Astley (ENG)	1
Billy Joe Castle (ENG)	2
**Scott Donaldson (SCO) (25)**	**4**
Peter Lines (ENG)	1
**Kyren Wilson (ENG) (8)**	**4**

Last 32; Best of 7 frames
Tom Ford (ENG) (24)	3
**Zhang Jiankang (CHN)**	**4**
**Scott Donaldson (SCO) (25)**	**4**
Kyren Wilson (ENG) (8)	2

Last 16; Best of 7 frames
Zhang Jiankang (CHN)	2
**Scott Donaldson (SCO) (25)**	**4**

==== Section 3 ====
Last 128; Best of 7 frames
**John Higgins (SCO) (5)**	**4**
Jamie O'Neill (ENG)	1
**Alexander Ursenbacher (SUI)**	**4**
Michael Holt (ENG)	0
Lyu Haotian (CHN) (28)	1
**Andrew Higginson (ENG)**	**4**
**Si Jiahui (CHN)**	**4**
Brandon Sargeant (ENG)	1
**Jack Lisowski (ENG) (12)**	**4**
Zhang Anda (CHN)	1
Adam Stefanow (POL)	3
**David Grace (ENG)**	**4**
**Ryan Day (WAL) (21)**	**4**
Thor Chuan Leong (MYS)	2
Jamie Clarke (WAL)	1
**Mike Dunn (ENG)**	**4**

Last 64; Best of 7 frames
**John Higgins (SCO) (5)**	**4**
Alexander Ursenbacher (SUI)	1
**Andrew Higginson (ENG)**	**4**
Si Jiahui (CHN)	2
**Jack Lisowski (ENG) (12)**	**4**
David Grace (ENG)	0
Ryan Day (WAL) (21)	3
**Mike Dunn (ENG)**	**4**

Last 32; Best of 7 frames
**John Higgins (SCO) (5)**	**4**
Andrew Higginson (ENG)	3
**Jack Lisowski (ENG) (12)**	**4**
Mike Dunn (ENG)	1

Last 16; Best of 7 frames
John Higgins (SCO) (5)	2
**Jack Lisowski (ENG) (12)**	**4**

==== Section 4 ====
Last 128; Best of 7 frames
**Robert Milkins (ENG)**	**4**
Nigel Bond (ENG)	1
**Thepchaiya Un-Nooh (THA) (20)**	**4**
Liang Wenbo (CHN)	1
Sam Craigie (ENG)	0
**Marco Fu (HKG)**	**4**
**Stephen Maguire (SCO) (13)**	**4**
Jimmy White (ENG)	0
**Tian Pengfei (CHN)**	**4**
Oliver Lines (ENG)	2
Zhou Yuelong (CHN) (29)	3
**Peter Ebdon (ENG)**	**4**
**Ian Burns (ENG)**	**4**
Craig Steadman (ENG)	3
**Neil Robertson (AUS) (4)**	**4**
Ken Doherty (IRL)	1

Last 64; Best of 7 frames
Robert Milkins (ENG)	1
**Thepchaiya Un-Nooh (THA) (20)**	**4**
**Marco Fu (HKG)**	**4**
Stephen Maguire (SCO) (13)	2
Tian Pengfei (CHN)	3
**Peter Ebdon (ENG)**	**4**
Ian Burns (ENG)	1
**Neil Robertson (AUS) (4)**	**4**

Last 32; Best of 7 frames
**Thepchaiya Un-Nooh (THA) (20)**	**4**
Marco Fu (HKG)	2
Peter Ebdon (ENG)	0
**Neil Robertson (AUS) (4)**	**4**

Last 16; Best of 7 frames
**Thepchaiya Un-Nooh (THA) (20)**	**4**
Neil Robertson (AUS) (4)	0

=== Bottom half ===
==== Section 5 ====
Last 128; Best of 7 frames
**Ronnie O'Sullivan (ENG) (3)**	**4**
Dominic Dale (WAL)	3
**James Cahill (ENG)**	**4**
Sunny Akani (THA)	2
Luca Brecel (BEL) (30)	1
**Martin Gould (ENG)**	**4**
**Kacper Filipiak (POL)**	**4**
Michael Georgiou (CYP)	3
**Joe Perry (ENG) (14)**	**4**
Michael Collumb (SCO)	1
**Kishan Hirani (WAL)**	**4**
David Lilley (ENG)	2
**Yan Bingtao (CHN) (19)**	**4**
Barry Pinches (ENG)	1
Bai Langning (CHN)	2
**Joe O'Connor (ENG)**	**4**

Last 64; Best of 7 frames
**Ronnie O'Sullivan (ENG) (3)**	**4**
James Cahill (ENG)	0
**Martin Gould (ENG)**	**4**
Kacper Filipiak (POL)	3
**Joe Perry (ENG) (14)**	**4**
Kishan Hirani (WAL)	3
Yan Bingtao (CHN) (19)	2
**Joe O'Connor (ENG)**	**4**

Last 32; Best of 7 frames
**Ronnie O'Sullivan (ENG) (3)**	**4**
Martin Gould (ENG)	0
**Joe Perry (ENG) (14)**	**4**
Joe O'Connor (ENG)	2

Last 16; Best of 7 frames
**Ronnie O'Sullivan (ENG) (3)**	**4**
Joe Perry (ENG) (14)	2

==== Section 6 ====
Last 128; Best of 7 frames
Jackson Page (WAL)	3
**Martin O'Donnell (ENG)**	**4**
**Jimmy Robertson (ENG) (22)**	**4**
Harvey Chandler (ENG)	1
**Kurt Maflin (NOR)**	**4**
Alex Borg (MLT)	1
Stuart Bingham (ENG) (11)	2
**Matthew Stevens (WAL)**	**4**
**Liam Highfield (ENG)**	**4**
Jordan Brown (NIR)	3
Matthew Selt (ENG) (27)	1
**Li Hang (CHN)**	**4**
**Alfie Burden (ENG)**	**4**
Soheil Vahedi (IRN)	2
**Mark Selby (ENG) (6)**	**4**
Mark Joyce (ENG)	2

Last 64; Best of 7 frames
Martin O'Donnell (ENG)	2
**Jimmy Robertson (ENG) (22)**	**4**
**Kurt Maflin (NOR)**	**4**
Matthew Stevens (WAL)	3
**Liam Highfield (ENG)**	**4**
Li Hang (CHN)	3
Alfie Burden (ENG)	1
**Mark Selby (ENG) (6)**	**4**

Last 32; Best of 7 frames
**Jimmy Robertson (ENG) (22)**	**4**
Kurt Maflin (NOR)	3
Liam Highfield (ENG)	0
**Mark Selby (ENG) (6)**	**4**

Last 16; Best of 7 frames
Jimmy Robertson (ENG) (22)	0
**Mark Selby (ENG) (6)**	**4**

==== Section 7 ====
Last 128; Best of 7 frames
**Shaun Murphy (ENG) (7)**	**4**
Daniel Wells (WAL)	1
**Mark Davis (ENG)**	**4**
Sam Baird (ENG)	3
**Ricky Walden (ENG) (26)**	**4**
Luo Honghao (CHN)	3
**Stuart Carrington (ENG)**	**4**
Xu Si (CHN)	3
**David Gilbert (ENG) (10)**	**4**
Eden Sharav (ISR)	0
Fraser Patrick (SCO)	2
**Chang Bingyu (CHN)**	**4**
**Xiao Guodong (CHN) (23)**	**4**
Duane Jones (WAL)	0
**Andy Lee (HKG)**	**4**
Fergal O'Brien (IRL)	2

Last 64; Best of 7 frames
**Shaun Murphy (ENG) (7)**	**4**
Mark Davis (ENG)	0
**Ricky Walden (ENG) (26)**	**4**
Stuart Carrington (ENG)	3
**David Gilbert (ENG) (10)**	**4**
Chang Bingyu (CHN)	2
**Xiao Guodong (CHN) (23)**	**4**
Andy Lee (HKG)	0

Last 32; Best of 7 frames
**Shaun Murphy (ENG) (7)**	**4**
Ricky Walden (ENG) (26)	2
**David Gilbert (ENG) (10)**	**4**
Xiao Guodong (CHN) (23)	3

Last 16; Best of 7 frames
Shaun Murphy (ENG) (7)	2
**David Gilbert (ENG) (10)**	**4**

==== Section 8 ====
Last 128; Best of 7 frames
Chen Zifan (CHN)	3
**Ben Woollaston (ENG)**	**4**
**Graeme Dott (SCO) (18)**	**4**
Igor Figueiredo (BRA)	0
**Mei Xiwen (CHN)**	**4**
Gary Thomson (SCO)	3
**Ding Junhui (CHN) (15)**	**4**
Michael White (WAL)	1
**Alan McManus (SCO)**	**4**
Zhao Xintong (CHN)	1
Noppon Saengkham (THA) (31)	2
**James Wattana (THA)**	**4**
**Yuan Sijun (CHN)**	**4**
Mitchell Mann (ENG)	2
**Judd Trump (ENG) (2)**	**4**
Amine Amiri (MAR)	0

Last 64; Best of 7 frames
Ben Woollaston (ENG)	1
**Graeme Dott (SCO) (18)**	**4**
Mei Xiwen (CHN)	0
**Ding Junhui (CHN) (15)**	**4**
Alan McManus (SCO)	0
**James Wattana (THA)**	**4**
Yuan Sijun (CHN)	0
**Judd Trump (ENG) (2)**	**4**

Last 32; Best of 7 frames
**Graeme Dott (SCO) (18)**	**4**
Ding Junhui (CHN) (15)	0
James Wattana (THA)	1
**Judd Trump (ENG) (2)**	**4**

Last 16; Best of 7 frames
Graeme Dott (SCO) (18)	2
**Judd Trump (ENG) (2)**	**4**

=== Finals ===
**Quarter-finals**; Best of 9 frames
**Mark Allen (NIR) (1)**	**5**
Scott Donaldson (SCO) (25)	1
**Jack Lisowski (ENG) (12)**	**5**
Thepchaiya Un-Nooh (THA) (20)	3
Ronnie O'Sullivan (ENG) (3)	4
**Mark Selby (ENG) (6)**	**5**
**David Gilbert (ENG) (10)**	**5**
Judd Trump (ENG) (2)	2

**Semi-finals**; Best of 11 frames
Mark Allen (NIR) (1)	5
**Jack Lisowski (ENG) (12)**	**6**
**Mark Selby (ENG) (6)**	**6**
David Gilbert (ENG) (10)	1

**Final**; Best of 17 frames
Jack Lisowski (ENG) (12)	6
**Mark Selby (ENG) (6)**	**9**

=== Final ===
Final: Best of 17 frames. Referee: Marcel Eckardt. Emirates Arena, Glasgow, Scotland, 15 December 2019.
Jack Lisowski (12); England	6–**9**	**Mark Selby** (6); England
Afternoon: **131**–7, **69**–25, 7–**83**, 0–**80**, **66**–0, 1–**117** (117), 0–**65**, 34–**68**; Evening: **134**–0 (119), 22–**84**, **80**–43, 38–**75**, 23–**82**, **123**–5, 0–**79**
**119**	Highest break	117
1	Century breaks	1

== Century breaks ==
There were a total of 80 century breaks made during the tournament. The highest was a 143 made by Lisowski in frame three of his quarter-final win.

- 143, 135, 124, 119, 118, 100 – Jack Lisowski
- 142, 124, 108, 100 – David Gilbert
- 139, 100 – Joe Perry
- 137, 125 – Graeme Dott
- 136, 101 – Yan Bingtao
- 135, 132, 120, 117 – Mark Selby
- 134, 132, 128 – Chris Wakelin
- 132, 118, 104, 100 – Ding Junhui
- 132, 102 – Kyren Wilson
- 129, 124, 123, 105 – Liam Highfield
- 129, 106 – Ryan Day
- 128, 109, 108, 103 – Xiao Guodong
- 128 – Robert Milkins
- 127 – Kurt Maflin
- 126, 100 – Stephen Maguire
- 124, 121, 104, 102 – Mark Allen
- 124 – Adam Stefanow
- 123, 113, 111, 111, 110, 109, 106 – Ronnie O'Sullivan
- 123, 109 – John Higgins
- 120 – Chen Feilong
- 119, 104 – Marco Fu
- 119 – Lu Ning
- 119 – Hossein Vafaei
- 118, 101 – Gary Wilson
- 118 – Ali Carter
- 115, 112 – Yuan Sijun
- 115 – Sam Baird
- 114 – Thepchaiya Un-Nooh
- 112 – Matthew Stevens
- 111, 102, 101 – Judd Trump
- 106 – Stuart Carrington
- 105, 102 – Neil Robertson
- 105 – Jimmy Robertson
- 103 – Chen Zifan
- 103 – Tom Ford
- 101 – Luca Brecel
