= 2018 Northern Ireland Open =

2018 BetVictor Northern Ireland Open

Tournament information
- Dates: 12–18 November 2018
- Venue: Waterfront Hall
- City: Belfast
- Country: Northern Ireland
- Organisation: World Snooker
- Format: Ranking event
- Total prize fund: £366,000
- Winner's share: £70,000
- Highest break: Li Hang (CHN) (145); Thepchaiya Un-Nooh (THA) (145)

Final
- Champion: Judd Trump (ENG)
- Runner-up: Ronnie O'Sullivan (ENG)
- Score: 9–7

The 2018 Northern Ireland Open (officially the 2018 BetVictor Northern Ireland Open) was a professional ranking snooker tournament that took place between 12 and 18 November 2018 in the Waterfront Hall in Belfast, Northern Ireland. It was the eighth ranking event of the 2018/2019 season and a part of the Home Nations Series.

Mark Williams was the defending champion, but he was beaten 3–4 by Ali Carter in the second round.

Judd Trump won his ninth professional ranking title with a 9–7 final victory against Ronnie O'Sullivan.

== Prize fund ==
The breakdown of prize money for this year is shown below:

- Winner: £70,000
- Runner-up: £30,000
- Semi-final: £20,000
- Quarter-final: £10,000
- Last 16: £6,000
- Last 32: £3,500
- Last 64: £2,500
- Highest break: £2,000
- Total: £366,000

The "rolling 147 prize" for a maximum break: £10,000

== Main draw ==
=== Top half ===
==== Section 1 ====
Last 128; Best of 7 frames
(Wales) Mark Williams (1) | 4
(England) Alfie Burden | 2
(England) Paul Davison | 1
(England) Ali Carter | 4
(China) Fan Zhengyi | 0
(Thailand) Sunny Akani | 4
(China) Xiao Guodong | 4
(England) Harvey Chandler | 3
(England) Joe Perry (16) | 2
(England) Nigel Bond | 4
(England) Luke Simmonds | 1
(Northern Ireland) Joe Swail | 4
(England) Mark Joyce | 0
(Wales) Michael White | 4
(Israel) Eden Sharav | 4
(China) Li Yuan | 3

Last 64; Best of 7 frames
(Wales) Mark Williams (1) | 3
(England) Ali Carter | 4
(Thailand) Sunny Akani | 3
(China) Xiao Guodong | 4
(England) Nigel Bond | 2
(Northern Ireland) Joe Swail | 4
(Wales) Michael White | 2
(Israel) Eden Sharav | 4

Last 32; Best of 7 frames
(England) Ali Carter | 4
(China) Xiao Guodong | 2
(Northern Ireland) Joe Swail | 2
(Israel) Eden Sharav | 4

Last 16; Best of 7 frames
(England) Ali Carter | 3
(Israel) Eden Sharav | 4

==== Section 2 ====
Last 128; Best of 7 frames
(England) Adam Duffy | 0
(England) Sam Craigie | 4
(China) Zhang Yong | 3
(China) Li Hang | 4
(England) Ashley Carty | 0
(Norway) Kurt Maflin | 4
(Australia) Neil Robertson (9) | 4
(England) Ben Woollaston | 3
(England) Mark Davis | 4
(Thailand) Noppon Saengkham | 3
(China) Luo Honghao | 4
(China) Lyu Haotian | 2
(England) Peter Ebdon | 4
(Northern Ireland) Patrick Wallace | 0
(England) Kyren Wilson (8) | 3
(Wales) Lee Walker | 4

Last 64; Best of 7 frames
(England) Sam Craigie | 2
(China) Li Hang | 4
(Norway) Kurt Maflin | 3
(Australia) Neil Robertson (9) | 4
(England) Mark Davis | 4
(China) Luo Honghao | 1
(England) Peter Ebdon | 4
(Wales) Lee Walker | 3

Last 32; Best of 7 frames
(China) Li Hang | 4
(Australia) Neil Robertson (9) | 0
(England) Mark Davis | 1
(England) Peter Ebdon | 4

Last 16; Best of 7 frames
(China) Li Hang | 1
(England) Peter Ebdon | 4

==== Section 3 ====
Last 128; Best of 7 frames
(England) Judd Trump (5) | 4
(England) Matthew Selt | 2
(England) Stuart Carrington | 4
(China) Xu Si | 1
(England) Liam Highfield | 4
(Thailand) James Wattana | 2
(England) Jack Lisowski | 4
(Iran) Hossein Vafaei | 0
(Belgium) Luca Brecel (12) | 4
(Northern Ireland) Raymond Fry | 1
(England) Ian Burns | 4
(England) Farakh Ajaib | 1
(China) Zhao Xintong | 1
(Wales) Daniel Wells | 4
(England) Gary Wilson | 4
(Poland) Adam Stefanow | 3

Last 64; Best of 7 frames
(England) Judd Trump (5) | 4
(England) Stuart Carrington | 0
(England) Liam Highfield | 3
(England) Jack Lisowski | 4
(Belgium) Luca Brecel (12) | 4
(England) Ian Burns | 0
(Wales) Daniel Wells | 3
(England) Gary Wilson | 4

Last 32; Best of 7 frames
(England) Judd Trump (5) | 4
(England) Jack Lisowski | 0
(Belgium) Luca Brecel (12) | 4
(England) Gary Wilson | 2

Last 16; Best of 7 frames
(England) Judd Trump (5) | 4
(Belgium) Luca Brecel (12) | 2

==== Section 4 ====
Last 128; Best of 7 frames
(Northern Ireland) Jordan Brown | 1
(Finland) Robin Hull | 4
(China) Tian Pengfei | 4
(England) Mike Dunn | 3
(China) Zhang Anda | 4
(China) Yan Bingtao | 3
(Wales) Ryan Day (13) | 4
(Cyprus) Michael Georgiou | 1
(Wales) Jamie Clarke | 1
(China) Yuan Sijun | 4
(England) Andrew Higginson | w/o
(China) Liang Wenbo | w/d
(Scotland) Graeme Dott | 3
(England) Billy Joe Castle | 4
(Scotland) John Higgins (4) | 2
(England) Rory McLeod | 4

Last 64; Best of 7 frames
(Finland) Robin Hull | 4
(China) Tian Pengfei | 1
(China) Zhang Anda | 3
(Wales) Ryan Day (13) | 4
(China) Yuan Sijun | 3
(England) Andrew Higginson | 4
(England) Billy Joe Castle | 4
(England) Rory McLeod | 1

Last 32; Best of 7 frames
(Finland) Robin Hull | 3
(Wales) Ryan Day (13) | 4
(England) Andrew Higginson | 4
(England) Billy Joe Castle | 2

Last 16; Best of 7 frames
(Wales) Ryan Day (13) | 4
(England) Andrew Higginson | 0

=== Bottom half ===
==== Section 5 ====
Last 128; Best of 7 frames
(England) Ronnie O'Sullivan (3) | 4
(Iran) Soheil Vahedi | 0
(China) Mei Xiwen | 4
(China) Zhang Jiankang | 0
(Malaysia) Thor Chuan Leong | 1
(England) Chris Wakelin | 4
(England) Tom Ford | 4
(England) Rod Lawler | 3
(Scotland) Stephen Maguire (14) | 2
(England) Michael Holt | 4
(England) Mark King | 4
(England) John Astley | 0
(China) Zhou Yuelong | 4
(Germany) Lukas Kleckers | 1
(Wales) Kishan Hirani | 4
(Wales) Jak Jones | 3

Last 64; Best of 7 frames
(England) Ronnie O'Sullivan (3) | 4
(China) Mei Xiwen | 1
(England) Chris Wakelin | 3
(England) Tom Ford | 4
(England) Michael Holt | 4
(England) Mark King | 3
(China) Zhou Yuelong | 4
(Wales) Kishan Hirani | 0

Last 32; Best of 7 frames
(England) Ronnie O'Sullivan (3) | 4
(England) Tom Ford | 0
(England) Michael Holt | 3
(China) Zhou Yuelong | 4

Last 16; Best of 7 frames
(England) Ronnie O'Sullivan (3) | 4
(China) Zhou Yuelong | 1

==== Section 6 ====
Last 128; Best of 7 frames
(Scotland) Alan McManus | 4
(England) Allan Taylor | 0
(England) Craig Steadman | 3
(China) Lu Ning | 4
(England) Hammad Miah | 4
(Egypt) Basem Eltahhan | 2
(Northern Ireland) Mark Allen (11) | 1
(China) Niu Zhuang | 4
(England) Ricky Walden | 3
(Wales) Matthew Stevens | 4
(Northern Ireland) Gerard Greene | 4
(England) Oliver Lines | 0
(England) David Gilbert | 4
(Republic of Ireland) Fergal O'Brien | 1
(England) Barry Hawkins (6) | 3
(China) Chen Zifan | 4

Last 64; Best of 7 frames
(Scotland) Alan McManus | 1
(China) Lu Ning | 4
(England) Hammad Miah | 4
(China) Niu Zhuang | 0
(Wales) Matthew Stevens | 4
(Northern Ireland) Gerard Greene | 1
(England) David Gilbert | 4
(China) Chen Zifan | 2

Last 32; Best of 7 frames
(China) Lu Ning | 4
(England) Hammad Miah | 2
(Wales) Matthew Stevens | 2
(England) David Gilbert | 4

Last 16; Best of 7 frames
(China) Lu Ning | 0
(England) David Gilbert | 4

==== Section 7 ====
Last 128; Best of 7 frames
(England) Shaun Murphy (7) | 2
(England) Sam Baird | 4
(Wales) Dominic Dale | 3
(Scotland) Chris Totten | 4
(England) Robert Milkins | 0
(Thailand) Thepchaiya Un-Nooh | 4
(England) Elliot Slessor | 1
(Scotland) Ross Muir | 4
(England) Stuart Bingham (10) | 2
(England) Peter Lines | 4
(Germany) Simon Lichtenberg | 0
(England) Robbie Williams | 4
(Hong Kong) Andy Lee | 1
(England) Sean O'Sullivan | 4
(England) Sanderson Lam | 4
(England) Joe O'Connor | 3

Last 64; Best of 7 frames
(England) Sam Baird | 3
(Scotland) Chris Totten | 4
(Thailand) Thepchaiya Un-Nooh | 4
(Scotland) Ross Muir | 0
(England) Peter Lines | 2
(England) Robbie Williams | 4
(England) Sean O'Sullivan | 3
(England) Sanderson Lam | 4

Last 32; Best of 7 frames
(Scotland) Chris Totten | 1
(Thailand) Thepchaiya Un-Nooh | 4
(England) Robbie Williams | 4
(England) Sanderson Lam | 1

Last 16; Best of 7 frames
(Thailand) Thepchaiya Un-Nooh | 4
(England) Robbie Williams | 0

==== Section 8 ====
Last 128; Best of 7 frames
(England) David Lilley | 4
(Wales) Duane Jones | 2
(Republic of Ireland) Ken Doherty | 1
(Scotland) Scott Donaldson | 4
(England) Jimmy White | 3
(England) Martin O'Donnell | 4
(Hong Kong) Marco Fu (15) | 2
(China) Chen Feilong | 4
(Scotland) Anthony McGill | 0
(Switzerland) Alexander Ursenbacher | 4
(England) Ashley Hugill | 2
(Pakistan) Hamza Akbar | 4
(England) Jimmy Robertson | 4
(England) James Cahill | 1
(England) Mark Selby (2) | 4
(England) Anthony Hamilton | 1

Last 64; Best of 7 frames
(England) David Lilley | 2
(Scotland) Scott Donaldson | 4
(England) Martin O'Donnell | 4
(China) Chen Feilong | 1
(Switzerland) Alexander Ursenbacher | 3
(Pakistan) Hamza Akbar | 4
(England) Jimmy Robertson | 0
(England) Mark Selby (2) | 4

Last 32; Best of 7 frames
(Scotland) Scott Donaldson | 1
(England) Martin O'Donnell | 4
(Pakistan) Hamza Akbar | 0
(England) Mark Selby (2) | 4

Last 16; Best of 7 frames
(England) Martin O'Donnell | 2
(England) Mark Selby (2) | 4

=== Finals ===
Quarter-finals; Best of 9 frames
(Israel) Eden Sharav | 5
(England) Peter Ebdon | 4
(England) Judd Trump (5) | 5
(Wales) Ryan Day (13) | 3
(England) Ronnie O'Sullivan (3) | 5
(England) David Gilbert | 2
(Thailand) Thepchaiya Un-Nooh | 3
(England) Mark Selby (2) | 5

Semi-finals; Best of 11 frames
(Israel) Eden Sharav | 3
(England) Judd Trump (5) | 6
(England) Ronnie O'Sullivan (3) | 6
(England) Mark Selby (2) | 5

Final; Best of 17 frames
(England) Judd Trump (5) | 9
(England) Ronnie O'Sullivan (3) | 7

== Final ==
Final: Best of 17 frames. Referee: Maike Kesseler. Waterfront Hall, Belfast, Northern Ireland, 18 November 2018.
| Judd Trump (5); England | 9–7 | Ronnie O'Sullivan (3); England |
Afternoon: 76–64, 0–73, 1–65, 112–12 (105), 117–6 (117), 41–78, 108–0 (108), 48–60; Evening: 24–68, 64–52, 73–33, 0–78, 0–134 (134), 92–0, 65–5, 79–0
| 117 | Highest break | 134 |
| 3 | Century breaks | 1 |

== Century breaks ==
Total: 71

- 145, 139, 137, 115, 112 – Li Hang
- 145, 138, 104 – Thepchaiya Un-Nooh
- 142, 121 – Eden Sharav
- 142, 119 – Hammad Miah
- 140, 126 – Ryan Day
- 137, 120, 117, 115, 112, 108, 108, 107, 105 – Judd Trump
- 136, 101 – Noppon Saengkham
- 135, 134, 132, 119, 116, 114, 112, 111, 108, 102 – Ronnie O'Sullivan
- 134, 121, 102 – Zhou Yuelong
- 132 – Luca Brecel
- 132 – Tian Pengfei
- 131, 118 – Lu Ning
- 128, 127, 122, 122, 101 – Mark Selby
- 127 – James Wattana
- 125 – Neil Robertson
- 124, 113, 102 – David Gilbert
- 122 – Niu Zhuang
- 120, 110 – Jimmy Robertson
- 118, 109 – Daniel Wells
- 115 – Sam Craigie
- 113 – Robin Hull
- 113 – Joe O'Connor
- 113 – Ben Woollaston
- 111 – Zhang Yong
- 110 – Mark King
- 107 – Peter Ebdon
- 105 – Sam Baird
- 102 – Harvey Chandler
- 102 – Tom Ford
- 102 – Luo Honghao
- 101 – Ian Burns
- 101 – Andrew Higginson
- 100 – Zhang Anda
