= 2017 Northern Ireland Open =

2017 Dafabet Northern Ireland Open

Tournament information
- Dates: 20–26 November 2017
- Venue: Waterfront Hall
- City: Belfast
- Country: Northern Ireland
- Organisation: World Snooker
- Format: Ranking event
- Total prize fund: £366,000
- Winner's share: £70,000
- Highest break: John Higgins (SCO) (142)

Final
- Champion: Mark Williams (WAL)
- Runner-up: Yan Bingtao (CHN)
- Score: 9–8

The 2017 Northern Ireland Open (officially the 2017 Dafabet Northern Ireland Open) was a professional ranking snooker tournament that took place between 20 and 26 November 2017 in the Waterfront Hall in Belfast, Northern Ireland. It was the tenth ranking event of the 2017/2018 season and a part of the Home Nations Series. It was the second edition of the Northern Ireland Open.

Mark King was the defending champion, but he was beaten 1–4 in the third round by Yan Bingtao. Yan went on to reach the final, becoming the youngest ever finalist of a ranking event. He faced Mark Williams, who won the 19th ranking title of his career by beating Yan 9–8. With his victory, Williams ended a ranking title drought dating back to the 2011 German Masters lasting 6 years and 9 months. Williams had come from 7–8 behind to win, and denied Yan becoming the youngest ever winner of a ranking event. Ronnie O'Sullivan still holds that record for the 1993 UK Championship.

== Prize fund ==
The breakdown of prize money for this year is shown below:

- Winner: £70,000
- Runner-up: £30,000
- Semi-final: £20,000
- Quarter-final: £10,000
- Last 16: £6,000
- Last 32: £3,500
- Last 64: £2,500
- Highest break: £2,000
- Total: £366,000

The "rolling 147 prize" for a maximum break stood at £10,000

== Main draw ==
=== Top half ===
==== Section 1 ====
Last 128; Best of 7 frames
(England) Mark King (1)	4
(Australia) Matthew Bolton	1
(Republic of Ireland) Josh Boileau	2
(England) Ashley Hugill	4
(England) Jamie Curtis-Barrett	4
(Wales) Ian Preece	1
(England) Robbie Williams	0
(China) Yan Bingtao	4
(Wales) Ryan Day (16)	4
(England) John Astley	3
(China) Cao Yupeng	3
(China) Li Hang	4
(China) Zhou Yuelong	4
(Scotland) Graeme Dott	3
(Finland) Robin Hull	4
(Scotland) Eden Sharav	3

Last 64; Best of 7 frames
(England) Mark King (1)	4
(England) Ashley Hugill	1
(England) Jamie Curtis-Barrett	0
(China) Yan Bingtao	4
(Wales) Ryan Day (16)	4
(China) Li Hang	2
(China) Zhou Yuelong	1
(Finland) Robin Hull	4

Last 32; Best of 7 frames
(England) Mark King (1)	1
(China) Yan Bingtao	4
(Wales) Ryan Day (16)	4
(Finland) Robin Hull	3

Last 16; Best of 7 frames
(China) Yan Bingtao	4
(Wales) Ryan Day (16)	3

==== Section 2 ====
Last 128; Best of 7 frames
(England) Ricky Walden	4
(England) Hammad Miah	0
(England) Jack Lisowski	4
(England) Sean O'Sullivan	0
(England) Jimmy Robertson	4
(Wales) Michael White	2
(England) Barry Hawkins (9)	3
(China) Zhao Xintong	4
(England) Alfie Burden	3
(England) Robert Milkins	4
(England) Oliver Lines	4
(China) Xu Si	3
(England) Billy Joe Castle	4
(Northern Ireland) Declan Brennan	2
(Australia) Neil Robertson (8)	4
(Wales) Jamie Jones	1

Last 64; Best of 7 frames
(England) Ricky Walden	4
(England) Jack Lisowski	2
(England) Jimmy Robertson	4
(China) Zhao Xintong	3
(England) Robert Milkins	4
(England) Oliver Lines	1
(England) Billy Joe Castle	0
(Australia) Neil Robertson (8)	4

Last 32; Best of 7 frames
(England) Ricky Walden	4
(England) Jimmy Robertson	3
(England) Robert Milkins	4
(Australia) Neil Robertson (8)	3

Last 16; Best of 7 frames
(England) Ricky Walden	2
(England) Robert Milkins	4

==== Section 3 ====
Last 128; Best of 7 frames
(Northern Ireland) Mark Allen (5)	4
(England) Sanderson Lam	2
(Iran) Soheil Vahedi	2
(China) Tian Pengfei	4
(England) Craig Steadman	1
(China) Yu Delu	4
(Pakistan) Hamza Akbar	3
(Thailand) Noppon Saengkham	4
(Belgium) Luca Brecel (12)	w/d
(China) Fang Xiongman	w/o
(Scotland) Chris Totten	0
(England) Chris Wakelin	4
(England) Jimmy White	4
(Wales) Dominic Dale	3
(Wales) Jak Jones	4
(Wales) Lee Walker	3

Last 64; Best of 7 frames
(Northern Ireland) Mark Allen (5)	3
(China) Tian Pengfei	4
(China) Yu Delu	3
(Thailand) Noppon Saengkham	4
(China) Fang Xiongman	1
(England) Chris Wakelin	4
(England) Jimmy White	4
(Wales) Jak Jones	0

Last 32; Best of 7 frames
(China) Tian Pengfei	4
(Thailand) Noppon Saengkham	2
(England) Chris Wakelin	4
(England) Jimmy White	0

Last 16; Best of 7 frames
(China) Tian Pengfei	4
(England) Chris Wakelin	1

==== Section 4 ====
Last 128; Best of 7 frames
(China) Niu Zhuang	4
(England) Ian Burns	3
(England) Peter Lines	2
(Republic of Ireland) Ken Doherty	4
(England) Liam Highfield	4
(England) Mark Davis	3
(China) Liang Wenbo (13)	4
(Wales) Jackson Page	1
(Scotland) Alan McManus	1
(China) Yuan Sijun	4
(China) Lyu Haotian	4
(Northern Ireland) Joe Swail	3
(England) Allan Taylor	2
(Thailand) Thepchaiya Un-Nooh	4
(England) Shaun Murphy (4)	1
(China) Chen Zifan	4

Last 64; Best of 7 frames
(China) Niu Zhuang	1
(Republic of Ireland) Ken Doherty	4
(England) Liam Highfield	4
(China) Liang Wenbo (13)	1
(China) Yuan Sijun	1
(China) Lyu Haotian	4
(Thailand) Thepchaiya Un-Nooh	4
(China) Chen Zifan	3

Last 32; Best of 7 frames
(Republic of Ireland) Ken Doherty	3
(England) Liam Highfield	4
(China) Lyu Haotian	4
(Thailand) Thepchaiya Un-Nooh	2

Last 16; Best of 7 frames
(England) Liam Highfield	2
(China) Lyu Haotian	4

=== Bottom half ===
==== Section 5 ====
Last 128; Best of 7 frames
(Scotland) John Higgins (3)	4
(England) Nigel Bond	2
(Iran) Hossein Vafaei	4
(England) Anthony Hamilton	2
(Scotland) Stephen Maguire	4
(Egypt) Basem Eltahhan	0
(England) Gary Wilson	4
(Switzerland) Alexander Ursenbacher	1
(Scotland) Anthony McGill (14)	w/o
(Thailand) Boonyarit Keattikun	w/d
(England) Rory McLeod	2
(England) Adam Duffy	4
(England) Sam Baird	3
(China) Zhang Yong	4
(India) Aditya Mehta	0
(China) Li Yuan	4

Last 64; Best of 7 frames
(Scotland) John Higgins (3)	4
(Iran) Hossein Vafaei	1
(Scotland) Stephen Maguire	0
(England) Gary Wilson	4
(Scotland) Anthony McGill (14)	4
(England) Adam Duffy	1
(China) Zhang Yong	0
(China) Li Yuan	4

Last 32; Best of 7 frames
(Scotland) John Higgins (3)	3
(England) Gary Wilson	4
(Scotland) Anthony McGill (14)	3
(China) Li Yuan	4

Last 16; Best of 7 frames
(England) Gary Wilson	1
(China) Li Yuan	4

==== Section 6 ====
Last 128; Best of 7 frames
(China) Mei Xiwen	4
(Northern Ireland) Jordan Brown	0
(Malta) Alex Borg	4
(England) Peter Ebdon	3
(England) Mark Joyce	3
(England) Ben Woollaston	4
(England) Kyren Wilson (11)	1
(England) Sam Craigie	4
(England) Elliot Slessor	4
(Australia) Kurt Dunham	0
(England) Andrew Higginson	1
(Norway) Kurt Maflin	4
(Wales) Duane Jones	4
(England) Mitchell Mann	1
(England) Ronnie O'Sullivan (6)	4
(Germany) Lukas Kleckers	2

Last 64; Best of 7 frames
(China) Mei Xiwen	4
(Malta) Alex Borg	1
(England) Ben Woollaston	2
(England) Sam Craigie	4
(England) Elliot Slessor	4
(Norway) Kurt Maflin	2
(Wales) Duane Jones	0
(England) Ronnie O'Sullivan (6)	4

Last 32; Best of 7 frames
(China) Mei Xiwen	2
(England) Sam Craigie	4
(England) Elliot Slessor	4
(England) Ronnie O'Sullivan (6)	1

Last 16; Best of 7 frames
(England) Sam Craigie	1
(England) Elliot Slessor	4

==== Section 7 ====
Last 128; Best of 7 frames
(Wales) Jamie Clarke	2
(England) Mike Dunn	4
(Wales) Matthew Stevens	4
(Republic of Ireland) Leo Fernandez	0
(Cyprus) Michael Georgiou	4
(England) David Grace	0
(England) Martin O'Donnell	w/d
(England) Michael Holt	w/o
(England) Ali Carter (10)	4
(China) Chen Zhe	0
(China) Xiao Guodong	4
(England) Christopher Keogan	2
(Scotland) Rhys Clark	0
(England) Matthew Selt	4
(Northern Ireland) Gerard Greene	3
(England) Joe Perry	4

Last 64; Best of 7 frames
(England) Mike Dunn	4
(Wales) Matthew Stevens	0
(Cyprus) Michael Georgiou	2
(England) Michael Holt	4
(England) Ali Carter (10)	1
(China) Xiao Guodong	4
(England) Matthew Selt	0
(England) Joe Perry	4

Last 32; Best of 7 frames
(England) Mike Dunn	4
(England) Michael Holt	1
(China) Xiao Guodong	1
(England) Joe Perry	4

Last 16; Best of 7 frames
(England) Mike Dunn	4
(England) Joe Perry	1

==== Section 8 ====
Last 128; Best of 7 frames
(China) Zhang Anda	2
(Thailand) Sunny Akani	4
(Scotland) Scott Donaldson	2
(China) Wang Yuchen	4
(England) Tom Ford	4
(Republic of Ireland) Fergal O'Brien	2
(Wales) Mark Williams (15)	4
(Thailand) James Wattana	0
(Wales) Daniel Wells	0
(England) David Gilbert	4
(England) Paul Davison	4
(England) Rod Lawler	0
(Scotland) Ross Muir	4
(Malaysia) Thor Chuan Leong	3
(England) Judd Trump (2)	2
(England) Stuart Carrington	4

Last 64; Best of 7 frames
(Thailand) Sunny Akani	4
(China) Wang Yuchen	3
(England) Tom Ford	0
(Wales) Mark Williams (15)	4
(England) David Gilbert	4
(England) Paul Davison	2
(Scotland) Ross Muir	4
(England) Stuart Carrington	2

Last 32; Best of 7 frames
(Thailand) Sunny Akani	1
(Wales) Mark Williams (15)	4
(England) David Gilbert	4
(Scotland) Ross Muir	3

Last 16; Best of 7 frames
(Wales) Mark Williams (15)	4
(England) David Gilbert	2

=== Finals ===
Quarter-finals; Best of 9 frames
(China) Yan Bingtao	5
(England) Robert Milkins	4
(China) Tian Pengfei	4
(China) Lyu Haotian	5
(China) Li Yuan	4
(England) Elliot Slessor	5
(England) Mike Dunn	1
(Wales) Mark Williams (15)	5

Semi-finals; Best of 11 frames
(China) Yan Bingtao	6
(China) Lyu Haotian	2
(England) Elliot Slessor	2
(Wales) Mark Williams (15)	6

Final; Best of 17 frames
(China) Yan Bingtao	8
(Wales) Mark Williams (15)	9

== Final ==
Final: Best of 17 frames. Referee: Marcel Eckardt. Waterfront Hall, Belfast, Northern Ireland, 26 November 2017.
Yan Bingtao; China	8–9	Mark Williams (15); Wales
Afternoon: 79–43, 71–0 (51), 19–67, 74–32, 0–104 (104), 94–29 (63), 3–63, 66–12; Evening: 137–0 (137), 33–82 (62), 5–90 (90), 36–89 (58), 73–23 (59), 18–63, 75–45 (60), 26–75, 28–77
137	Highest break	104
1	Century breaks	1
5	50+ breaks	4

== Century breaks ==
Total: 53

- 142, 135, 107 – John Higgins
- 140, 120 – Kurt Maflin
- 138, 129 – Stephen Maguire
- 138 – Ben Woollaston
- 137, 114, 113 – Yan Bingtao
- 137 – Lukas Kleckers
- 134 – Dominic Dale
- 134 – Ryan Day
- 132, 105 – Robert Milkins
- 131 – Li Yuan
- 129, 107 – Joe Perry
- 129 – Gary Wilson
- 128 – Robin Hull
- 127, 113, 106, 104 – Mark Williams
- 126 – Ronnie O'Sullivan
- 125, 119 – Sunny Akani
- 125 – Anthony McGill
- 115, 107, 105 – Thepchaiya Un-Nooh
- 113, 108 – Matthew Selt
- 110, 106 – Sam Craigie
- 110 – Xiao Guodong
- 109, 106 – Tian Pengfei
- 108 – Allan Taylor
- 106 – Paul Davison
- 105 – Kyren Wilson
- 104 – Neil Robertson
- 104 – Yuan Sijun
- 103, 103 – Zhou Yuelong
- 103 – Ken Doherty
- 103 – Michael Holt
- 102 – Cao Yupeng
- 101, 100 – Jack Lisowski
- 101 – Tom Ford
- 101 – Chen Zifan
