= Billy Castle =

English snooker player

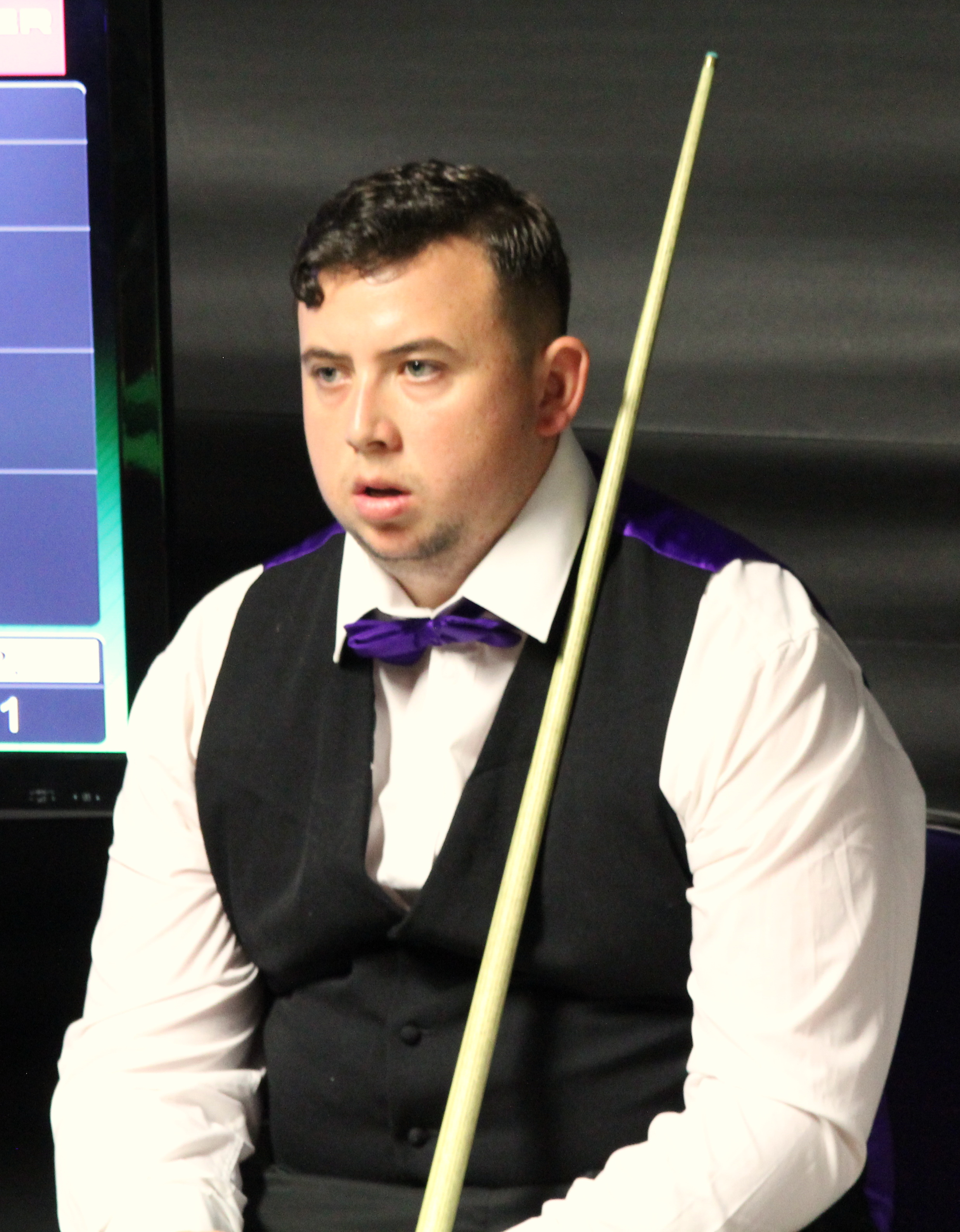
- Castle at the 2017 Paul Hunter Classic

Personal information
- Born: 14 July 1992 (age 34) Marchwood, Hampshire, England

Sport
- Country: England
- Sport: Snooker
- Professional: 2017–2021
- Highest ranking: 88 (June 2018)
- Best ranking finish: Quarter-final (2022 Snooker Shoot Out)

Billy Joe Castle (born 14 July 1992 in Marchwood, Hampshire) is an English former professional snooker player.

== Career ==
Castle came through the 2017 Q School by winning six matches to earn a two-year card on the World Snooker Tour for the 2017–18 and 2018–19 seasons. Prior to this Castle appeared in the 2015 English Amateur Championship final, losing 6–10 to Michael Rhodes. In 2017 he won the tournament by defeating David Lilley 10–8.

== Performance and rankings timeline ==
Tournament	2015/ 16	2017/ 18	2018/ 19	2019/ 20	2020/ 21	2021/ 22
Ranking (Note: It shows the ranking at the beginning of the season)	(Note: He was an amateur)	(Note: New players on the Main Tour don't have a ranking)	88	(Note: Players qualified through Q School started the season without ranking points)	86	
Ranking tournaments
Championship League	Non-Ranking Event				RR	RR
British Open	Tournament Not Held					A
Northern Ireland Open	NH	2R	3R	3R	1R	A
English Open	NH	1R	1R	1R	1R	A
UK Championship	A	1R	1R	1R	1R	A
Scottish Open	NH	1R	3R	2R	1R	A
World Grand Prix	DNQ	DNQ	DNQ	DNQ	DNQ	DNQ
Shoot Out	NR	3R	2R	4R	1R	QF
German Masters	A	LQ	LQ	LQ	LQ	A
Players Championship	DNQ	DNQ	DNQ	DNQ	DNQ	DNQ
European Masters	NH	3R	LQ	LQ	1R	A
Welsh Open	A	1R	2R	2R	1R	A
Gibraltar Open	MR	1R	2R	1R	1R	WD
Tour Championship	Not Held		DNQ	DNQ	DNQ	DNQ
World Championship	A	LQ	LQ	LQ	LQ	LQ
Former ranking tournaments
Australian Goldfields Open	LQ	Tournament Not Held				
Shanghai Masters	A	LQ	Non-Ranking		Not Held	
Paul Hunter Classic	MR	1R	4R	NR	Not Held	
Indian Open	NH	LQ	LQ	Tournament Not Held		
China Open	A	LQ	LQ	Tournament Not Held		
Riga Masters (Note: The event was called the Riga Open (2015/2016))	MR	LQ	LQ	LQ	Not Held	
International Championship	A	LQ	LQ	LQ	Not Held	
China Championship	NH	LQ	LQ	LQ	Not Held	
World Open	NH	LQ	LQ	LQ	Not Held	
WST Pro Series	Tournament Not Held				RR	NH
Former non-ranking tournaments
Haining Open	MR	A	A	2R	Not Held	

Performance Table Legend
LQ	lost in the qualifying draw	#R	lost in the early rounds of the tournament (WR = Wildcard round, RR = Round robin)	QF	lost in the quarter-finals
SF	lost in the semi-finals	F	lost in the final	W	won the tournament
DNQ	did not qualify for the tournament	A	did not participate in the tournament	WD	withdrew from the tournament

NH / Not Held	means an event was not held.
NR / Non-Ranking Event	means an event is/was no longer a ranking event.
R / Ranking Event	means an event is/was a ranking event.
MR / Minor-Ranking Event	means an event is/was a minor-ranking event.

== Career finals ==
=== Amateur finals: 3 (2 titles) ===
Outcome	No.	Year	Championship	Opponent in the final	Score
Runner-up	1.	2015	English Amateur Championship	(England) Michael Rhodes	6–10
Winner	1.	2017	English Amateur Championship	(England) David Lilley	10–7
Winner	2.	2022	Q Tour – Event 4	(England) Andrew Higginson	5–4
