= 2018 Scottish Open (snooker) =

2018 BetVictor Scottish Open

Tournament information
- Dates: 10–16 December 2018
- Venue: Emirates Arena
- City: Glasgow
- Country: Scotland
- Organisation: World Snooker
- Format: Ranking event
- Total prize fund: £366,000
- Winner's share: £70,000
- Highest break: John Higgins (SCO) (147)

Final
- Champion: Mark Allen (NIR)
- Runner-up: Shaun Murphy (ENG)
- Score: 9–7

The 2018 Scottish Open (officially the 2018 BetVictor Scottish Open) was a professional ranking snooker tournament, that took place from 10 to 16 December 2018 at the Emirates Arena in Glasgow, Scotland. It is the tenth ranking event of the 2018/2019 season and a part of the Home Nations Series.

Neil Robertson was the defending champion, but he lost 2–4 to Ross Muir in the second round. The tournament was won by Mark Allen who beat Shaun Murphy in the final. Allen led 6–3, but then Murphy won four frames in a row to take a 7–6 lead. Allen, however, won the next three frames to win 9–7.

John Higgins made the ninth maximum break of his career in the third frame of his second-round victory over Gerard Greene.

== Prize fund ==
The breakdown of prize money for this year is shown below:

- Winner: £70,000
- Runner-up: £30,000
- Semi-final: £20,000
- Quarter-final: £10,000
- Last 16: £6,000
- Last 32: £3,500
- Last 64: £2,500
- Highest break: £2,000
- Total: £366,000

The "rolling 147 prize" for a maximum break: £20,000

== Tournament draw ==
=== Top half ===
==== Section 1 ====
Last 128; Best of 7 frames
(Australia) Neil Robertson (1)	4
(England) Peter Lines	1
(Switzerland) Alexander Ursenbacher	1
(Scotland) Ross Muir	4
(England) Martin O'Donnell	4
(England) Chris Wakelin	1
(England) Rod Lawler	3
(England) Sam Baird	4
(England) Ali Carter (16)	4
(China) Luo Honghao	0
(Cyprus) Michael Georgiou	4
(England) Sean O'Sullivan	3
(England) Mark King	4
(China) Mei Xiwen	2
(England) David Lilley	4
(England) Tom Ford	3

Last 64; Best of 7 frames
(Australia) Neil Robertson (1)	2
(Scotland) Ross Muir	4
(England) Martin O'Donnell	1
(England) Sam Baird	4
(England) Ali Carter (16)	4
(Cyprus) Michael Georgiou	2
(England) Mark King	3
(England) David Lilley	4

Last 32; Best of 7 frames
(Scotland) Ross Muir	2
(England) Sam Baird	4
(England) Ali Carter (16)	4
(England) David Lilley	1

Last 16; Best of 7 frames
(England) Sam Baird	4
(England) Ali Carter (16)	3

==== Section 2 ====
Last 128; Best of 7 frames
(England) Joe Perry	4
(Thailand) James Wattana	0
(England) Liam Highfield	2
(England) Robbie Williams	4
(China) Li Hang	3
(England) Paul Davison	4
(England) Kyren Wilson (9)	4
(England) Oliver Lines	2
(England) Nigel Bond	4
(Hong Kong) Andy Lee	2
(England) Allan Taylor	2
(Wales) Michael White	4
(England) Sam Craigie	2
(England) Michael Holt	4
(England) Shaun Murphy (8)	4
(Thailand) Sunny Akani	1

Last 64; Best of 7 frames
(England) Joe Perry	4
(England) Robbie Williams	2
(England) Paul Davison	0
(England) Kyren Wilson (9)	4
(England) Nigel Bond	4
(Wales) Michael White	1
(England) Michael Holt	0
(England) Shaun Murphy (8)	4

Last 32; Best of 7 frames
(England) Joe Perry	3
(England) Kyren Wilson (9)	4
(England) Nigel Bond	2
(England) Shaun Murphy (8)	4

Last 16; Best of 7 frames
(England) Kyren Wilson (9)	3
(England) Shaun Murphy (8)	4

==== Section 3 ====
Last 128; Best of 7 frames
(England) Barry Hawkins (5)	3
(China) Zhou Yuelong	4
(China) Lyu Haotian	4
(China) Fan Zhengyi	2
(England) Stuart Carrington	4
(England) Gary Wilson	3
(Iran) Hossein Vafaei	w/d
(Israel) Eden Sharav	w/o
(England) Stuart Bingham (12)	0
(China) Tian Pengfei	4
(Finland) Robin Hull	4
(Wales) Kishan Hirani	2
(China) Lu Ning	4
(Wales) Duane Jones	3
(England) Sanderson Lam	1
(Wales) Jak Jones	4

Last 64; Best of 7 frames
(China) Zhou Yuelong	4
(China) Lyu Haotian	2
(England) Stuart Carrington	4
(Israel) Eden Sharav	2
(China) Tian Pengfei	4
(Finland) Robin Hull	0
(China) Lu Ning	4
(Wales) Jak Jones	3

Last 32; Best of 7 frames
(China) Zhou Yuelong	0
(England) Stuart Carrington	4
(China) Tian Pengfei	4
(China) Lu Ning	3

Last 16; Best of 7 frames
(England) Stuart Carrington	4
(China) Tian Pengfei	3

==== Section 4 ====
Last 128; Best of 7 frames
(England) Matthew Selt	3
(England) Ian Burns	4
(England) Joe O'Connor	2
(England) Mike Dunn	4
(Pakistan) Hamza Akbar	2
(Iran) Soheil Vahedi	4
(Scotland) Stephen Maguire (13)	1
(England) Billy Joe Castle	4
(China) Zhang Jiankang	4
(Germany) Simon Lichtenberg	1
(Northern Ireland) Jordan Brown	2
(Wales) Lee Walker	4
(England) Ben Woollaston	4
(England) Harvey Chandler	1
(England) Judd Trump (4)	4
(England) Jimmy White	0

Last 64; Best of 7 frames
(England) Ian Burns	4
(England) Mike Dunn	1
(Iran) Soheil Vahedi	1
(England) Billy Joe Castle	4
(China) Zhang Jiankang	4
(Wales) Lee Walker	2
(England) Ben Woollaston	0
(England) Judd Trump (4)	4

Last 32; Best of 7 frames
(England) Ian Burns	4
(England) Billy Joe Castle	1
(China) Zhang Jiankang	1
(England) Judd Trump (4)	4

Last 16; Best of 7 frames
(England) Ian Burns	1
(England) Judd Trump (4)	4

=== Bottom half ===
==== Section 5 ====
Last 128; Best of 7 frames
(Scotland) John Higgins (3)	4
(England) Adam Duffy	3
(Scotland) Chris Totten	1
(Northern Ireland) Gerard Greene	4
(England) Ashley Carty	4
(England) Craig Steadman	2
(Egypt) Basem Eltahhan	0
(China) Yan Bingtao	4
(Hong Kong) Marco Fu (14)	4
(China) Chen Zifan	3
(England) Alfie Burden	4
(England) Peter Ebdon	2
(Malaysia) Thor Chuan Leong	2
(England) James Cahill	4
(China) Zhang Yong	4
(Scotland) Anthony McGill	2

Last 64; Best of 7 frames
(Scotland) John Higgins (3)	4
(Northern Ireland) Gerard Greene	0
(England) Ashley Carty	0
(China) Yan Bingtao	4
(Hong Kong) Marco Fu (14)	3
(England) Alfie Burden	4
(England) James Cahill	2
(China) Zhang Yong	4

Last 32; Best of 7 frames
(Scotland) John Higgins (3)	4
(China) Yan Bingtao	0
(England) Alfie Burden	4
(China) Zhang Yong	3

Last 16; Best of 7 frames
(Scotland) John Higgins (3)	2
(England) Alfie Burden	4

==== Section 6 ====
Last 128; Best of 7 frames
(England) Rory McLeod	2
(Scotland) Scott Donaldson	4
(Scotland) Graeme Dott	4
(China) Xu Si	1
(Scotland) Alan McManus	4
(England) John Astley	3
(Belgium) Luca Brecel (11)	4
(England) Hammad Miah	0
(Thailand) Dechawat Poomjaeng	0
(England) Luke Simmonds	4
(China) Yuan Sijun	4
(China) Xiao Guodong	0
(China) Chen Feilong	4
(Scotland) Fraser Patrick	3
(Northern Ireland) Mark Allen (6)	4
(China) Liang Wenbo	2

Last 64; Best of 7 frames
(Scotland) Scott Donaldson	1
(Scotland) Graeme Dott	4
(Scotland) Alan McManus	2
(Belgium) Luca Brecel (11)	4
(England) Luke Simmonds	3
(China) Yuan Sijun	4
(China) Chen Feilong	1
(Northern Ireland) Mark Allen (6)	4

Last 32; Best of 7 frames
(Scotland) Graeme Dott	4
(Belgium) Luca Brecel (11)	3
(China) Yuan Sijun	1
(Northern Ireland) Mark Allen (6)	4

Last 16; Best of 7 frames
(Scotland) Graeme Dott	2
(Northern Ireland) Mark Allen (6)	4

==== Section 7 ====
Last 128; Best of 7 frames
(China) Ding Junhui (7)	4
(China) Niu Zhuang	0
(England) Robert Milkins	4
(Republic of Ireland) Fergal O'Brien	0
(Thailand) Noppon Saengkham	3
(Wales) Dominic Dale	4
(China) Zhao Xintong	4
(England) Ashley Hugill	1
(Wales) Ryan Day (10)	4
(Scotland) Rhys Clark	3
(Norway) Kurt Maflin	1
(England) Anthony Hamilton	4
(Wales) Jamie Clarke	3
(England) Mark Davis	4
(China) Zhang Anda	4
(Republic of Ireland) Ken Doherty	0

Last 64; Best of 7 frames
(China) Ding Junhui (7)	4
(England) Robert Milkins	1
(Wales) Dominic Dale	3
(China) Zhao Xintong	4
(Wales) Ryan Day (10)	4
(England) Anthony Hamilton	1
(England) Mark Davis	2
(China) Zhang Anda	4

Last 32; Best of 7 frames
(China) Ding Junhui (7)	4
(China) Zhao Xintong	3
(Wales) Ryan Day (10)	4
(China) Zhang Anda	2

Last 16; Best of 7 frames
(China) Ding Junhui (7)	2
(Wales) Ryan Day (10)	4

==== Section 8 ====
Last 128; Best of 7 frames
(Wales) Matthew Stevens	4
(China) Li Yuan	2
(England) Elliot Slessor	4
(Thailand) Thepchaiya Un-Nooh	1
(England) Jimmy Robertson	4
(Germany) Lukas Kleckers	2
(England) Jack Lisowski (15)	4
(Poland) Adam Stefanow	3
(Northern Ireland) Joe Swail	4
(England) Andrew Higginson	2
(England) Mark Joyce	4
(England) Ricky Walden	2
(Scotland) Craig MacGillivray	2
(England) David Gilbert	4
(England) Ronnie O'Sullivan (2)	w/d
(Wales) Daniel Wells	w/o

Last 64; Best of 7 frames
(Wales) Matthew Stevens	4
(England) Elliot Slessor	1
(England) Jimmy Robertson	4
(England) Jack Lisowski (15)	1
(Northern Ireland) Joe Swail	2
(England) Mark Joyce	4
(England) David Gilbert	1
(Wales) Daniel Wells	4

Last 32; Best of 7 frames
(Wales) Matthew Stevens	4
(England) Jimmy Robertson	3
(England) Mark Joyce	1
(Wales) Daniel Wells	4

Last 16; Best of 7 frames
(Wales) Matthew Stevens	0
(Wales) Daniel Wells	4

=== Finals ===
Quarter-finals; Best of 9 frames
(England) Sam Baird	0
(England) Shaun Murphy (8)	5
(England) Stuart Carrington	3
(England) Judd Trump (4)	5
(England) Alfie Burden	0
(Northern Ireland) Mark Allen (6)	5
(Wales) Ryan Day (10)	1
(Wales) Daniel Wells	5

Semi-finals; Best of 11 frames
(England) Shaun Murphy (8)	6
(England) Judd Trump (4)	3
(Northern Ireland) Mark Allen (6)	6
(Wales) Daniel Wells	5

Final; Best of 17 frames
(England) Shaun Murphy (8)	7
(Northern Ireland) Mark Allen (6)	9

== Final ==
Final: Best of 17 frames. Referee: Greg Coniglio; Emirates Arena, Glasgow, Scotland, 16 December 2018.
Shaun Murphy (8); England	7–9	Mark Allen (6); Northern Ireland
Afternoon: 0–110 (110), 69–5, 60–64, 72–52, 66–44, 4–82, 52–75, 4–83; Evening: 7–68, 108–0, 77–0, 128–0 (115), 57–44, 1–73, 0–134 (134), 36–83
115	Highest break	134
1	Century breaks	2

== Century breaks ==
Total: 70

- 147, 104 – John Higgins
- 141, 124, 122, 115, 101 – Shaun Murphy
- 139 – Lu Ning
- 138 – Zhou Yuelong
- 136, 122, 102 – Ali Carter
- 136, 101 – Yan Bingtao
- 136 – Nigel Bond
- 135 – Jimmy Robertson
- 134, 129, 126, 110, 106 – Mark Allen
- 134, 111, 105 – Ding Junhui
- 134 – Gerard Greene
- 133, 104, 102, 100 – Ryan Day
- 133, 103 – Marco Fu
- 130 – Eden Sharav
- 130 – Yuan Sijun
- 127, 119, 119, 117, 102, 101, 101 – Judd Trump
- 127 – Zhang Anda
- 122, 115, 108, 108 – Stuart Carrington
- 122, 108 – Joe Perry
- 121 – Mark Davis
- 119 – Matthew Stevens
- 115, 112 – James Cahill
- 114 – Ross Muir
- 113 – Jack Lisowski
- 110, 105 – Kyren Wilson
- 110 – Gary Wilson
- 109 – Duane Jones
- 107 – Tom Ford
- 107 – Joe Swail
- 106 – Ricky Walden
- 105 – Ian Burns
- 102 – Alfie Burden
- 101, 101 – Zhao Xintong
- 101 – Elliot Slessor
- 100 – Luca Brecel
- 100 – David Gilbert
- 100 – Mark King
- 100 – Alan McManus
- 100 – Robbie Williams
