= 2017 English Open (snooker) =

2017 Dafabet English Open
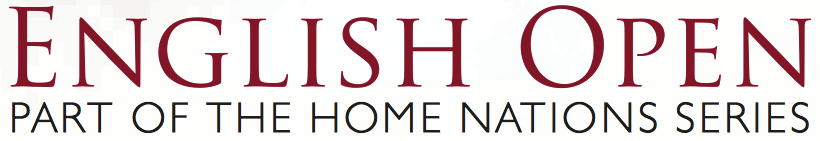

Tournament information
- Dates: 16–22 October 2017
- Venue: Barnsley Metrodome
- City: Barnsley
- Country: England
- Organisation: World Snooker
- Format: Ranking event
- Total prize fund: £366,000
- Winner's share: £70,000
- Highest break: Liang Wenbo (CHN) (147)

Final
- Champion: Ronnie O'Sullivan (ENG)
- Runner-up: Kyren Wilson (ENG)
- Score: 9–2

The 2017 English Open (officially the 2017 Dafabet English Open) was a professional ranking snooker tournament that took place from 16 to 22 October 2017 in Barnsley, South Yorkshire, England. It was the seventh ranking event of the 2017/2018 season and a part of the Home Nations Series.

Liang Wenbo was the defending champion, having beaten Judd Trump 9–6 in the 2016 final. Liang made a maximum break in his second round match against Tom Ford, but lost in the third round to Yan Bingtao. His maximum won him the "rolling 147 prize" of £40,000.

Ronnie O'Sullivan captured his 29th ranking title by beating Kyren Wilson 9–2 in the final. With his win O'Sullivan tied John Higgins for 2nd place on the all-time list of ranking event wins, only behind Stephen Hendry.

== Prize fund ==
The breakdown of prize money for this year is shown below:

- Winner: £70,000
- Runner-up: £30,000
- Semi-final: £20,000
- Quarter-final: £10,000
- Last 16: £6,000
- Last 32: £3,500
- Last 64: £2,500
- Highest break: £2,000
- Total: £366,000

The "rolling 147 prize" for a maximum break stood at £40,000

== Main draw ==
=== Qualifying round ===
(England) Allan Taylor	4–3	(England) David Lilley
(England) Ian Burns	3–4	(China) Zhang Anda

(China) Fang Xiongman	4–0	(England) Joe O'Connor

=== Top half ===
==== Section 1 ====
Last 128; Best of 7 frames
(China) Liang Wenbo (1)	4
(Wales) Duane Jones	1
(England) Tom Ford	4
(China) Xu Si	1
(Egypt) Basem Eltahhan	0
(Wales) Jamie Jones	4
(Thailand) Noppon Saengkham	0
(China) Yan Bingtao	4
(Scotland) Anthony McGill (16)	4
(England) Michael Holt	3
(China) Lyu Haotian	4
(England) Allan Taylor	1
(Thailand) Sunny Akani	4
(Australia) Matthew Bolton	2
(Scotland) Chris Totten	3
(Northern Ireland) Joe Swail	4

Last 64; Best of 7 frames
(China) Liang Wenbo (1)	4
(England) Tom Ford	3
(Wales) Jamie Jones	1
(China) Yan Bingtao	4
(Scotland) Anthony McGill (16)	4
(China) Lyu Haotian	2
(Thailand) Sunny Akani	4
(Northern Ireland) Joe Swail	2

Last 32; Best of 7 frames
(China) Liang Wenbo (1)	0
(China) Yan Bingtao	4
(Scotland) Anthony McGill (16)	4
(Thailand) Sunny Akani	3

Last 16; Best of 7 frames
(China) Yan Bingtao	3
(Scotland) Anthony McGill (16)	4

==== Section 2 ====
Last 128; Best of 7 frames
(England) Jimmy Robertson	4
(England) Adam Duffy	2
(England) Gary Wilson	4
(England) Sean O'Sullivan	1
(China) Li Hang	4
(England) Chris Wakelin	2
(Australia) Neil Robertson (9)	4
(England) Billy Joe Castle	0
(Wales) Ian Preece	4
(China) Mei Xiwen	0
(England) Sam Craigie	0
(India) Aditya Mehta	4
(China) Chen Zifan	4
(England) Sanderson Lam	3
(England) Barry Hawkins (8)	4
(England) Peter Lines	2

Last 64; Best of 7 frames
(England) Jimmy Robertson	4
(England) Gary Wilson	2
(China) Li Hang	3
(Australia) Neil Robertson (9)	4
(Wales) Ian Preece	2
(India) Aditya Mehta	4
(China) Chen Zifan	4
(England) Barry Hawkins (8)	3

Last 32; Best of 7 frames
(England) Jimmy Robertson	2
(Australia) Neil Robertson (9)	4
(India) Aditya Mehta	4
(China) Chen Zifan	1

Last 16; Best of 7 frames
(Australia) Neil Robertson (9)	4
(India) Aditya Mehta	1

==== Section 3 ====
Last 128; Best of 7 frames
(England) Judd Trump (5)	4
(England) Robbie Williams	3
(China) Yu Delu	3
(England) Mark Joyce	4
(Wales) Matthew Stevens	4
(Scotland) Eden Sharav	0
(Republic of Ireland) Josh Boileau	0
(England) David Gilbert	4
(Belgium) Luca Brecel (12)	4
(Wales) Ryan Day	1
(England) David Grace	1
(Wales) Mark Williams	4
(England) Jamie Curtis-Barrett	2
(China) Li Yuan	4
(England) Rory McLeod	0
(England) Jack Lisowski	4

Last 64; Best of 7 frames
(England) Judd Trump (5)	4
(England) Mark Joyce	0
(Wales) Matthew Stevens	4
(England) David Gilbert	2
(Belgium) Luca Brecel (12)	1
(Wales) Mark Williams	4
(China) Li Yuan	3
(England) Jack Lisowski	4

Last 32; Best of 7 frames
(England) Judd Trump (5)	4
(Wales) Matthew Stevens	1
(Wales) Mark Williams	2
(England) Jack Lisowski	4

Last 16; Best of 7 frames
(England) Judd Trump (5)	3
(England) Jack Lisowski	4

==== Section 4 ====
Last 128; Best of 7 frames
(Scotland) Rhys Clark	4
(Scotland) Alan McManus	3
(China) Zhang Yong	4
(Australia) Kurt Dunham	3
(England) Mark Davis	4
(China) Chen Zhe	3
(England) Ronnie O'Sullivan (13)	4
(China) Zhang Anda	1
(England) Robert Milkins	4
(Scotland) Stephen Maguire	0
(England) Ashley Hugill	4
(England) Nigel Bond	2
(England) Matthew Selt	4
(England) Alfie Burden	2
(Scotland) John Higgins (4)	4
(England) Elliot Slessor	3

Last 64; Best of 7 frames
(Scotland) Rhys Clark	2
(China) Zhang Yong	4
(England) Mark Davis	1
(England) Ronnie O'Sullivan (13)	4
(England) Robert Milkins	4
(England) Ashley Hugill	2
(England) Matthew Selt	1
(Scotland) John Higgins (4)	4

Last 32; Best of 7 frames
(China) Zhang Yong	1
(England) Ronnie O'Sullivan (13)	4
(England) Robert Milkins	3
(Scotland) John Higgins	4

Last 16; Best of 7 frames
(England) Ronnie O'Sullivan (13)	4
(Scotland) John Higgins (4)	3

=== Bottom half ===
==== Section 5 ====
Last 128; Best of 7 frames
(China) Ding Junhui (3)	4
(England) Christopher Keogan	1
(Germany) Lukas Kleckers	1
(Wales) Michael White	4
(England) Craig Steadman	4
(Finland) Robin Hull	3
(England) Ben Woollaston	4
(England) Peter Ebdon	2
(England) Ali Carter (14)	4
(England) Oliver Lines	1
(Thailand) James Wattana	4
(England) Martin O'Donnell	2
(England) John Astley	4
(England) Paul Davison	2
(China) Yuan Sijun	4
(England) Joe Perry	1

Last 64; Best of 7 frames
(China) Ding Junhui (3)	2
(Wales) Michael White	4
(England) Craig Steadman	3
(England) Ben Woollaston	4
(England) Ali Carter (14)	3
(Thailand) James Wattana	4
(England) John Astley	3
(China) Yuan Sijun	4

Last 32; Best of 7 frames
(Wales) Michael White	4
(England) Ben Woollaston	0
(Thailand) James Wattana	4
(China) Yuan Sijun	2

Last 16; Best of 7 frames
(Wales) Michael White	4
(Thailand) James Wattana	3

==== Section 6 ====
Last 128; Best of 7 frames
(Republic of Ireland) Ken Doherty	1
(Northern Ireland) Gerard Greene	4
(England) Anthony Hamilton	2
(Switzerland) Alexander Ursenbacher	4
(England) Stuart Carrington	4
(Thailand) Boonyarit Keattikun	1
(Northern Ireland) Mark Allen (11)	4
(England) Jimmy White	0
(England) Liam Highfield	4
(Republic of Ireland) Fergal O'Brien	3
(Thailand) Thepchaiya Un-Nooh	4
(Norway) Kurt Maflin	2
(Wales) Dominic Dale	1
(Wales) Daniel Wells	4
(England) Shaun Murphy (6)	4
(Iran) Soheil Vahedi	1

Last 64; Best of 7 frames
(Northern Ireland) Gerard Greene	3
(Switzerland) Alexander Ursenbacher	4
(England) Stuart Carrington	4
(Northern Ireland) Mark Allen (11)	2
(England) Liam Highfield	4
(Thailand) Thepchaiya Un-Nooh	3
(Wales) Daniel Wells	2
(England) Shaun Murphy (6)	4

Last 32; Best of 7 frames
(Switzerland) Alexander Ursenbacher	4
(England) Stuart Carrington	2
(England) Liam Highfield	3
(England) Shaun Murphy (6)	4

Last 16; Best of 7 frames
(Switzerland) Alexander Ursenbacher	4
(England) Shaun Murphy (6)	1

==== Section 7 ====
Last 128; Best of 7 frames
(Hong Kong) Marco Fu (7)	1
(China) Tian Pengfei	4
(Cyprus) Michael Georgiou	1
(England) Hammad Miah	4
(England) Mitchell Mann	4
(Republic of Ireland) Leo Fernandez	3
(China) Zhou Yuelong	w/d
(England) Andrew Higginson	w/o
(England) Stuart Bingham (10)	4
(Wales) Lee Walker	0
(England) Mark King	2
(China) Fang Xiongman	4
(England) Martin Gould	1
(China) Zhao Xintong	4
(Iran) Hossein Vafaei	4
(China) Niu Zhuang	2

Last 64; Best of 7 frames
(China) Tian Pengfei	1
(England) Hammad Miah	4
(England) Mitchell Mann	0
(England) Andrew Higginson	4
(England) Stuart Bingham (10)	4
(China) Fang Xiongman	2
(China) Zhao Xintong	2
(Iran) Hossein Vafaei	4

Last 32; Best of 7 frames
(England) Hammad Miah	1
(England) Andrew Higginson	4
(England) Stuart Bingham (10)	3
(Iran) Hossein Vafaei	4

Last 16; Best of 7 frames
(England) Andrew Higginson	1
(Iran) Hossein Vafaei	4

==== Section 8 ====
Last 128; Best of 7 frames
(Malaysia) Thor Chuan Leong	4
(Scotland) Graeme Dott	1
(China) Cao Yupeng	4
(Pakistan) Hamza Akbar	1
(England) Mike Dunn	4
(Malta) Alex Borg	2
(England) Kyren Wilson (15)	4
(England) Rod Lawler	3
(China) Xiao Guodong	4
(China) Wang Yuchen	2
(Wales) Jak Jones	2
(England) Ricky Walden	4
(England) Sam Baird	3
(Scotland) Ross Muir	4
(England) Mark Selby (2)	4
(Scotland) Scott Donaldson	3

Last 64; Best of 7 frames
(Malaysia) Thor Chuan Leong	4
(China) Cao Yupeng	2
(England) Mike Dunn	0
(England) Kyren Wilson (15)	4
(China) Xiao Guodong	4
(England) Ricky Walden	2
(Scotland) Ross Muir	1
(England) Mark Selby (2)	4

Last 32; Best of 7 frames
(Malaysia) Thor Chuan Leong	1
(England) Kyren Wilson (15)	4
(China) Xiao Guodong	4
(England) Mark Selby (2)	1

Last 16; Best of 7 frames
(England) Kyren Wilson (15)	4
(China) Xiao Guodong	0

=== Finals ===
Quarter-finals; Best of 9 frames
(Scotland) Anthony McGill (16)	5
(Australia) Neil Robertson (9)	3
(England) Jack Lisowski	2
(England) Ronnie O'Sullivan (13)	5
(Wales) Michael White	0
(Switzerland) Alexander Ursenbacher	5
(Iran) Hossein Vafaei	3
(England) Kyren Wilson (15)	5

Semi-finals; Best of 11 frames
(Scotland) Anthony McGill (16)	4
(England) Ronnie O'Sullivan (13)	6
(Switzerland) Alexander Ursenbacher	3
(England) Kyren Wilson (15)	6

Final; Best of 17 frames
(England) Ronnie O'Sullivan (13)	9
(England) Kyren Wilson (15)	2

== Final ==
Final: Best of 17 frames. Referee: Colin Humphries. Barnsley Metrodome, Barnsley, England, 22 October 2017.
Ronnie O'Sullivan (13); England	9–2	Kyren Wilson (15); England
Afternoon: 115–19 (115), 7–85 (74), 67–57 (O'Sullivan 54), 131–0 (131), 0–109 (109), 78–0 (77), 87–0 (87), 96–4 (96); Evening: 69–32 (50), 127–0 (127), 132–0 (132)
132	Highest break	109
4	Century breaks	1
9	50+ breaks	2

== Century breaks ==
Total: 83

- 147, 107, 105 – Liang Wenbo
- 144, 132, 130, 128 – Jack Lisowski
- 143, 128, 114, 105 – Judd Trump
- 141, 127, 112, 104, 104 – Stuart Bingham
- 140, 124, 118, 109, 109, 106, 103 – Kyren Wilson
- 140, 104 – Liam Highfield
- 139, 136, 134, 133, 132, 131, 129, 127, 127, 126, 125, 115 – Ronnie O'Sullivan
- 139 – Thor Chuan Leong
- 138, 131 – John Higgins
- 136, 135, 134 – Shaun Murphy
- 136 – Mitchell Mann
- 135 – Marco Fu
- 134, 132 – Neil Robertson
- 132, 115, 105 – Matthew Stevens
- 131 – Ian Preece
- 131 – David Gilbert
- 128, 100 – Michael White
- 127 – Ali Carter
- 126 – Tian Pengfei
- 124 – Mark Selby
- 123, 104, 104 – Yuan Sijun
- 123 – Barry Hawkins
- 123 – Alexander Ursenbacher
- 121 – Scott Donaldson
- 120 – Stuart Carrington
- 116 – Aditya Mehta
- 113 – Ding Junhui
- 112 – Sunny Akani
- 111 – Yan Bingtao
- 110, 105 – Tom Ford
- 110 – Ross Muir
- 110 – Xiao Guodong
- 108 – James Wattana
- 107, 101 – Jimmy Robertson
- 107 – Fang Xiongman
- 106 – Robin Hull
- 104 – Hamza Akbar
- 104 – Jamie Jones
- 102 – Chen Zifan
- 101 – Craig Steadman
- 100 – Mark Joyce
- 100 – Anthony McGill
