= Mei Xiwen =

Chinese snooker player

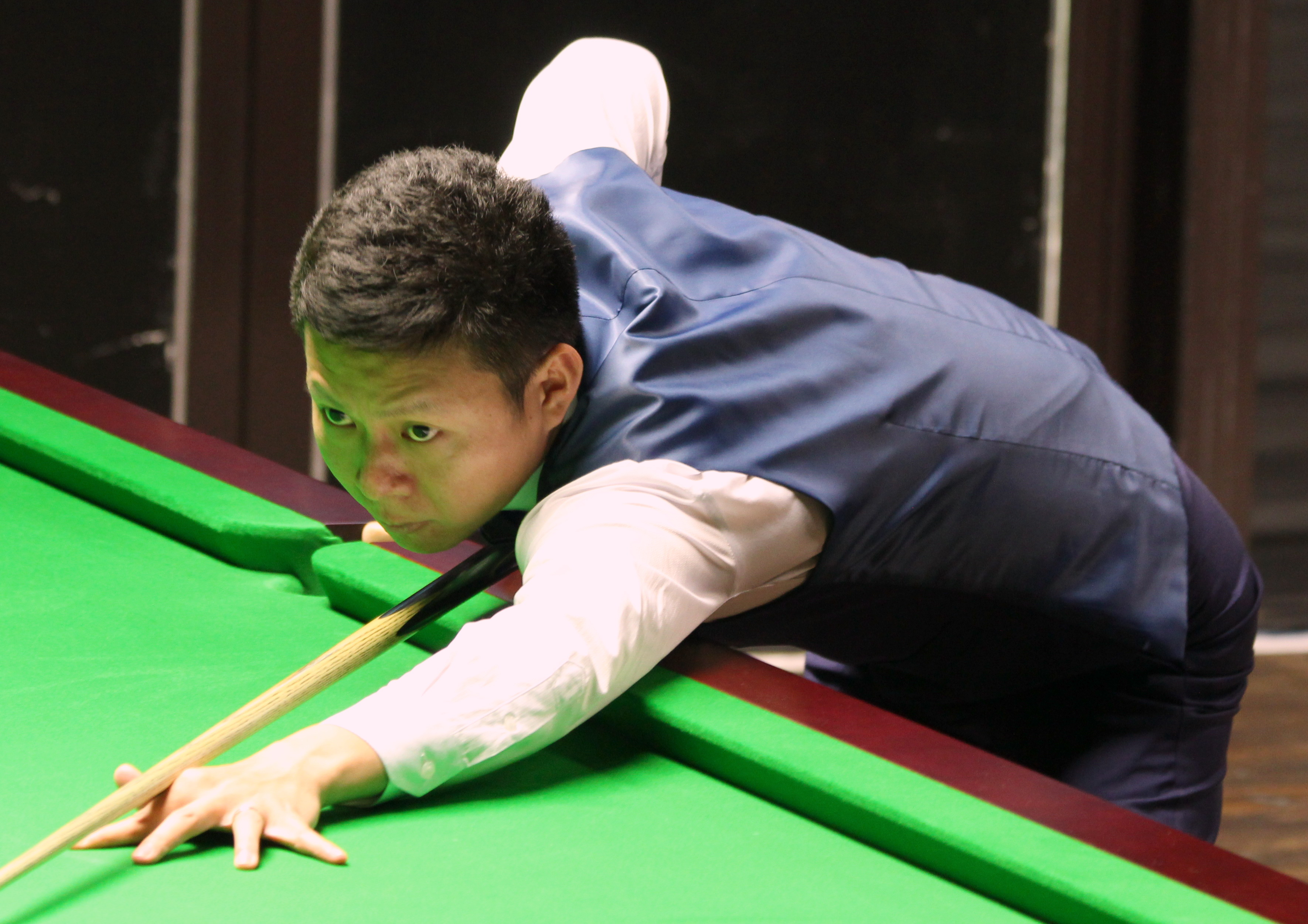
- Mei at the 2016 Paul Hunter Classic

Personal information
- Born: October 8, 1982 (age 44) Macheng, Hubei, China

Sport
- Country: China
- Sport: Snooker
- Professional: 2009/2010, 2016–2021
- Highest ranking: 55 (August 2020)
- Best ranking finish: Quarter-final (x2)

Mei Xiwen
- Simplified Chinese: 梅希文
- Traditional Chinese: 梅希文
Transcriptions
Standard Mandarin
- Hanyu Pinyin: Mei Xiwen
- IPA: [měɪ ɕí wə̌n]

Mei Xiwen (Chinese: 梅希文; born October 8, 1982) is a Chinese former professional snooker player.

== Career ==
Mei made his debut on the Main Tour in the 2009/2010 season, as the ACBS Asian nomination, playing his first match at the 2009 Grand Prix. He lost 5–0 to Patrick Wallace, and was defeated in his next two matches, in the UK Championship and the Welsh Open, to Atthasit Mahitthi and Stephen Rowlings respectively. Mei recorded his first win as a professional in the 2010 China Open, where he beat Noppadol Sangnil 5–4, having trailed 4–2, but lost in the next round, 5–1 to Robert Milkins. After losing in qualifying for the 2010 World Championship to David Morris, Mei finished the season ranked 89th, and was relegated from the tour thereafter.

Mei received a wildcard entry in to the 2010 Shanghai Masters and beat Mike Dunn 5–1, before losing 5–2 to Mark Selby. He also played in the wildcard round of the China Open and lost 5–3 to Marcus Campbell, as well as being unsuccessful at Q School. Over the next five seasons he only played in Asian Tour events and whilst he never made it beyond the fourth round, he did record wins over experienced players such as Mark Davis, Mark King and Xiao Guodong.

In 2016, Mei was given the Chinese nomination for a two-year professional tour place starting with the 2016/2017 season. In qualifying for the 2016 Shanghai Masters, Mei defeated Sanderson Lam 5–2, Gary Wilson 5–3, Dominic Dale 5–1 and Graeme Dott 5–0 to reach the televised stages in Shanghai. At the venue, he beat two-time world champion Mark Williams 5–3 to reach the last 16 of a ranking event for the first time in his career. He faced Ryan Day for a place in the quarter-finals, with Day pulling away from 2–2 to win 5–2. Mei defeated Jack Lisowski 6–5 and Martin Gould 6–3 at the UK Championship and then lost 6–4 to Marco Fu. He reached the last 16 of the Welsh Open with victories over Matthew Selt, Peter Ebdon and Mark Allen, but was beaten 4–2 by Robert Milkins.

In 2019, Mei reached quarter-final in English open after defeating Ronnie O'Sullivan in round of last 16. His opponent in quarter-final was eventual winner Mark Selby, who beat Mei 3–5.

Mei returned to China after losing in the 2nd round of the 2020 Gibraltar Open due to the ongoing COVID-19 pandemic, and hasn't entered any events since then. As a result, he dropped out of the top 64 at the end of the 2020–21 season and was relegated from tour, despite attaining his career ranking high of 55 at the start of the season.

== Performance and rankings timeline ==
Tournament	2006/ 07	2009/ 10	2010/ 11	2012/ 13	2013/ 14	2016/ 17	2017/ 18	2018/ 19	2019/ 20	2020/ 21
Ranking	(Note: He was an amateur.)	(Note: New players on the Main Tour don't have a ranking.)					70	(Note: Players qualified One Year Ranking List started the season without ranking points.)	69	55
Ranking tournaments
European Masters	Tournament Not Held					LQ	1R	LQ	LQ	A
English Open	Tournament Not Held					2R	1R	3R	QF	A
Championship League	Non-Ranking Event									A
Northern Ireland Open	Tournament Not Held					1R	3R	2R	2R	A
UK Championship	A	LQ	A	A	A	3R	1R	2R	2R	A
Scottish Open	Not Held			MR	NH	3R	2R	1R	2R	A
World Grand Prix	Tournament Not Held					DNQ	DNQ	DNQ	DNQ	DNQ
German Masters	Not Held		A	A	A	LQ	2R	LQ	LQ	A
Shoot-Out	Tournament Not Held					1R	2R	2R	QF	A
Welsh Open	A	LQ	A	A	A	4R	1R	2R	2R	A
Players Championship (Note: The event was called the Players Tour Championship Grand Finals (2010/2011–2012/2013))	Not Held		DNQ	DNQ	DNQ	DNQ	DNQ	DNQ	DNQ	DNQ
Gibraltar Open	Tournament Not Held					1R	2R	A	2R	A
WST Pro Series	Tournament Not Held									A
Tour Championship	Tournament Not Held							DNQ	DNQ	DNQ
World Championship	A	LQ	A	A	A	LQ	LQ	LQ	A	A
Former ranking tournaments
Paul Hunter Classic	Pro-am		Minor-Ranking			3R	A	A	NR	NH
Shanghai Masters	A	WD	1R	A	A	2R	3R	Non-Rank.		NH
Indian Open	Tournament Not Held				A	A	LQ	1R	Not Held	
China Open	1R	LQ	WR	A	A	LQ	LQ	2R	Not Held	
Riga Masters	Tournament Not Held					A	LQ	1R	3R	NH
International Championship	Not Held			A	A	LQ	1R	LQ	LQ	NH
China Championship	Tournament Not Held					NR	LQ	2R	LQ	NH
World Open (Note: The event was called the Grand Prix (2006/2007–2009/2010))	A	LQ	A	A	A	A	LQ	2R	1R	NH
Former non-ranking tournaments
Haining Open	Tournament Not Held					1R	QF	QF	3R	NH

Performance Table Legend
LQ	lost in the qualifying draw	#R	lost in the early rounds of the tournament (WR = Wildcard round, RR = Round robin)	QF	lost in the quarter-finals
SF	lost in the semi–finals	F	lost in the final	W	won the tournament
DNQ	did not qualify for the tournament	A	did not participate in the tournament	1R	withdrew from the tournament

NH / Not held	means an event was not held.
NR / Non-ranking event	means an event is/was no longer a ranking event.
R / Ranking event	means an event is/was now a ranking event

== Career finals ==
=== Amateur finals: 1 ===
Outcome	No.	Year	Championship	Opponent in the final	Score
Runner-up	1.	2009	ACBS Asian Snooker Championship	(Thailand) James Wattana	3–7
