= Scott Donaldson =

Scottish snooker player

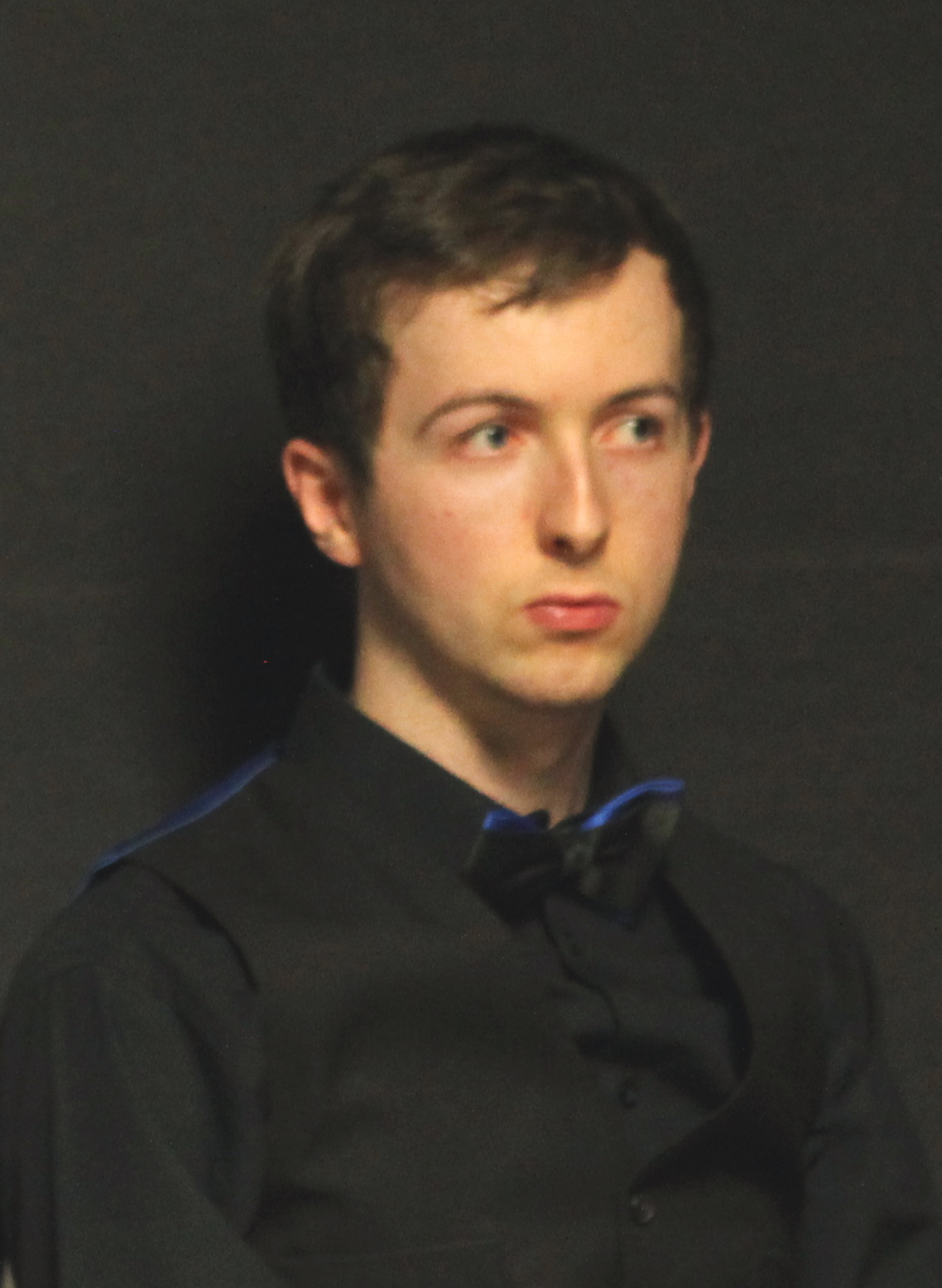
- Paul Hunter Classic 2016

Personal information
- Nickname: The Perthshire Potting Prince
- Born: 19 March 1994 (age 32) Perth, Scotland

Sport
- Country: Scotland
- Sport: Snooker
- Professional: 2012–present
- Highest ranking: 22 (February 2020)
- Current ranking: 59 (as of 7 November 2026)
- Century breaks: 106 (as of 16 November 2026)
- Best ranking finish: Semi-final (x4)

Scott Donaldson (born 19 March 1994) is a Scottish professional snooker player.

Donaldson turned professional in 2012 after winning the 2012 EBSA European Snooker Championship and gained a two-year tour card for the 2012–13 and 2013–14 snooker seasons. He reached his first ranking event semi-final at the 2017 Welsh Open. His first professional tournament win came at the non-ranking 2019–20 Championship League.

== Career ==
=== Debut season ===
Donaldson did not participate in the 2012 Wuxi Classic or the 2012 Australian Goldfields Open which both were held before the EBSA European Snooker Championships. His first match as a professional was a 4–2 win over Liam Highfield in the minor-ranking PTC Event 1. The tournament formed part of the Players Tour Championship events, of which Donaldson played all ten tournaments. His best result came in European Tour Event 1, where he beat Ricky Norris and Chris Norbury, before losing 3–4 to Michael Wild in the last 32. He was placed 70th on the Order of Merit.

His best run of results in a ranking event came at the Shanghai Masters Qualifying where he defeated Chen Zhe and Yu Delu, but then lost 1–5 to Nigel Bond. Donaldson's season ended when he was beaten 6–10 by Thepchaiya Un-Nooh in the first round of World Championship Qualifying. He finished his first year on tour ranked world number 89.

=== 2013/2014 season ===
In his opening match, Donaldson defeated Tom Ford 5–1 to qualify for the 2013 Wuxi Classic in China. In his first appearance in the first round of a ranking event he defeated Gareth Green 5–3 and then beat Jimmy Robertson 5–4, before losing 5–1 to Robert Milkins in the last 16. He was knocked out by Barry Hawkins in the quarter-finals of the minor-ranking Bulgarian Open and in the semi-finals of the Asian Tour event, the Yixing Open. He did not have to qualify for the UK Championship or the Welsh Open as all players on the tour began the events at the venue stage this season and Donaldson took advantage. In the UK he saw off Matthew Selt 6–4 and then secured what he called the best victory of his career to date by taking the last two frames against world number 13 Mark Davis in a 6–5 win. He lost a high quality encounter 6–3 to Joe Perry in the last 32. At the Welsh Donaldson saw off a trio of established players in Robert Milkins, David Gilbert and Andrew Higginson to reach the last 16 of a ranking event for the second time this season, where he was whitewashed 4–0 by Ding Junhui.

Donaldson's play in Asian Tour events this year helped him to finish eighth on the Order of Merit to qualify for the Finals for the first time. He met reigning world champion Ronnie O'Sullivan and was comfortably defeated 4–0. Donaldson's campaign ended with him at 65th in the world rankings, agonosingly short of reaching the top 64 who stay on tour. However, his standing of 38th on the European Order of Merit earned him the third of eight spots on offer to non-qualified players to earn a two-year main tour card for the 2014–15 and 2015–16 seasons.

=== 2014/2015 season ===
Donaldson began the season by qualifying for the 2014 Wuxi Classic, where he was beaten 5–3 by Chen Zifan in the wildcard round. He won four matches to qualify for the Australian Goldfields Open, which concluded with a 5–2 success over Kurt Maflin, before being whitewashed 5–0 by Stuart Bingham in the first round. At the minor-ranking Yixing Open, Donaldson won four matches to reach the quarter-finals, but lost 4–1 against Robert Milkins. However, after a 6–4 loss to Marcus Campbell in the first round of the UK Championship, Donaldson lost a further eight matches in a row to end the season.

=== 2015/2016 season ===
At the Paul Hunter Classic, Donaldson beat Ashley Hugill 4–1, 2014 world champion Mark Selby 4–2 and Martin Gould 4–2 to reach the last 16 where he lost 4–1 to Mark Williams. He came close to qualifying for the International Championship by winning two successive frames to force a decider against Mark Allen, but lost it. Donaldson finished 59th on the European Order of Merit which was high enough to earn him a new two-year card for the snooker tour.

=== 2016/2017 season ===
Donaldson won four matches to meet Ding Junhui in the opening round of the Shanghai Masters and had leads of 3–1 and 4–3, before Ding forced a deciding frame. Donaldson had a chance to pull off the shock, but missed a simple black and Ding won through. Donaldson reached the last 16 of both the European Masters and Northern Ireland Open, losing 4–3 to Anthony McGill and 4–2 to Hossein Vafaei respectively. At the Welsh Open he beat Jack Lisowski 4–1, Mark King 4–2, Jimmy Robertson 4–0 and Mark Davis 4–3 to reach the quarter-finals. He faced Zhou Yuelong, who was also appearing at this stage of a ranking event for the first time and Donaldson thrashed him 5–0. Donaldson pulled back from 4–1 down against Judd Trump in the semi-finals to 4–3, but lost 6–3. He won £20,000 for reaching the final four and was placed 65th in the world at the end of the season, the third highest of all the players who began the year on zero ranking points.

=== 2017/2018 season ===
Donaldson defeated the defending UK champion Mark Selby, 6–3, in the last 64 at the 2017 UK Championship, but was knocked out in the next round by Li Hang. Three months later, he reached the semi-final stage of a ranking event for only the second time in his career, at the 2018 Gibraltar Open; he won five matches before a 3–4 semi-final defeat against eventual champion Ryan Day.

== Performance and rankings timeline ==
Tournament	2011/ 12	2012/ 13	2013/ 14	2014/ 15	2015/ 16	2016/ 17	2017/ 18	2018/ 19	2019/ 20	2020/ 21	2021/ 22	2022/ 23	2023/ 24	2024/ 25	2025/ 26	2026/ 27
Ranking (Note: It shows the ranking at the beginning of the season)	(Note: He was an amateur)	(Note: New players on the Main Tour don't have a ranking)	89	(Note: Players qualified through European Tour Order of Merit started the season without prize money ranking points)	93		65	58	35	23	34	46	52	51	55	55
Ranking tournaments
Championship League	Non-Ranking Event									2R	RR	RR	RR	3R	RR	2R
China Open	A	LQ	LQ	LQ	LQ	1R	1R	SF	Tournament Not Held							LQ
Wuhan Open	Tournament Not Held												1R	LQ	2R	LQ
British Open	Tournament Not Held										2R	LQ	3R	LQ	1R	LQ
English Open	Tournament Not Held					2R	1R	1R	1R	1R	1R	2R	1R	LQ	1R	LQ
Shenzhen Open (Note: The event was called the Xi'an Grand Prix (2024/2025–2025/2026))	Tournament Not Held													WD	WD	2R
Northern Ireland Open	Tournament Not Held					4R	1R	3R	3R	QF	LQ	1R	LQ	1R	1R	QF
International Championship	NH	LQ	LQ	LQ	LQ	LQ	LQ	LQ	2R	Not Held			1R	LQ	3R	LQ
UK Championship	A	LQ	3R	1R	1R	2R	3R	2R	2R	1R	1R	LQ	LQ	LQ	2R	
Shoot Out	Non-Ranking Event					2R	2R	1R	1R	1R	1R	A	A	A	A	
Scottish Open	NH	MR	Not Held			2R	2R	2R	QF	1R	3R	2R	1R	1R	LQ	
German Masters	A	LQ	LQ	LQ	LQ	LQ	LQ	LQ	2R	LQ	LQ	LQ	1R	LQ	1R	LQ
Welsh Open	A	LQ	4R	1R	1R	SF	2R	QF	2R	3R	3R	LQ	LQ	1R	LQ	
World Grand Prix	Not Held			NR	DNQ	DNQ	DNQ	DNQ	2R	DNQ	DNQ	DNQ	DNQ	DNQ	DNQ	
Players Championship (Note: The event was called the Players Tour Championship Grand Final (2011/2012–2015/2016))	DNQ	DNQ	1R	DNQ	DNQ	DNQ	DNQ	DNQ	DNQ	DNQ	DNQ	DNQ	DNQ	DNQ	DNQ	
World Open	A	LQ	1R	Not Held		LQ	LQ	1R	LQ	Not Held			LQ	1R	LQ	
Tour Championship	Tournament Not Held							DNQ	DNQ	DNQ	DNQ	DNQ	DNQ	DNQ	DNQ	
World Championship	A	LQ	LQ	LQ	LQ	LQ	LQ	1R	LQ	LQ	1R	LQ	LQ	LQ	LQ	
Non-ranking tournaments
Champion of Champions	Not Held		A	A	A	A	A	A	A	1R	A	A	A	A	A	
Championship League	A	A	A	A	A	A	A	A	W	RR	2R	A	A	A	A	
Former ranking tournaments
Wuxi Classic	NR	A	3R	WR	Tournament Not Held											
Australian Goldfields Open	A	A	LQ	1R	LQ	Tournament Not Held										
Shanghai Masters	A	LQ	LQ	LQ	LQ	1R	LQ	Non-Ranking		Not Held			Non-Ranking Event			
Paul Hunter Classic	Minor-Ranking Event					2R	1R	SF	NR	Tournament Not Held						
Indian Open	Not Held		LQ	LQ	NH	LQ	LQ	QF	Tournament Not Held							
Riga Masters (Note: The event was called the Riga Open (2014/2015–2015/2016))	Not Held			Minor-Ranking		LQ	LQ	2R	1R	Tournament Not Held						
China Championship	Tournament Not Held					NR	LQ	3R	1R	Tournament Not Held						
WST Pro Series	Tournament Not Held									RR	Tournament Not Held					
Turkish Masters	Tournament Not Held										1R	Tournament Not Held				
Gibraltar Open	Tournament Not Held				MR	1R	SF	3R	3R	2R	1R	Tournament Not Held				
European Masters	Tournament Not Held					2R	LQ	1R	QF	2R	LQ	2R	1R	Not Held		
Saudi Arabia Masters	Tournament Not Held													6R	2R	NH
Former non-ranking tournaments
Six-red World Championship	NH	A	A	A	A	A	A	A	A	Not Held		LQ	Tournament Not Held			

Performance Table Legend
LQ	lost in the qualifying draw	#R	lost in the early rounds of the tournament (WR = Wildcard round, RR = Round robin)	QF	lost in the quarter-finals
SF	lost in the semi-finals	F	lost in the final	W	won the tournament
DNQ	did not qualify for the tournament	A	did not participate in the tournament	WD	withdrew from the tournament

NH / Not Held	means an event was not held.
NR / Non-Ranking Event	means an event is/was no longer a ranking event.
R / Ranking Event	means an event is/was a ranking event.
MR / Minor-Ranking Event	means an event is/was a minor-ranking event.

== Career finals ==
=== Non-ranking finals: 1 (1 title) ===
Outcome	No.	Year	Championship	Opponent in the final	Score
Winner	1.	2020	Championship League (March)	(Scotland) Graeme Dott	3–0

=== Amateur finals: 1 (1 title) ===
Outcome	No.	Year	Championship	Opponent in the final	Score
Winner	1.	2012	EBSA European Snooker Championship	(Republic of Ireland) Brendan O'Donoghue	7–3
