= 2017 International Championship =

2017 OPPO International Championship
Tournament information
- Dates: 29 October – 5 November 2017
- Venue: Baihu Media Broadcasting Centre
- City: Daqing
- Country: China
- Organisation: World Snooker
- Format: Ranking event
- Total prize fund: £750,000
- Winner's share: £150,000
- Highest break: Kyren Wilson (ENG) (147)

Final
- Champion: Mark Selby (ENG)
- Runner-up: Mark Allen (NIR)
- Score: 10–7

The 2017 International Championship (officially the 2017 OPPO International Championship) was a professional ranking snooker tournament that took place from 29 October to 5 November 2017 in Daqing, China. It was the eighth ranking event of the 2017/2018 season.

Qualifying for the tournament took place between 26 and 30 September 2017 in Preston.

Mark Selby was the defending champion, having beaten Ding Junhui 10–1 in the 2016 final. Selby retained his title by beating Mark Allen 10–7 in the final of this year's edition.

Kyren Wilson made the 133rd official maximum break in the 10th frame of his last 32 match against Martin Gould. It was Wilson's first professional maximum break.

== Prize fund ==
The breakdown of prize money for this year is shown below:

- Winner: £150,000
- Runner-up: £75,000
- Semi-final: £32,000
- Quarter-final: £21,500
- Last 16: £13,500
- Last 32: £8,500
- Last 64: £4,000
- Televised highest break: £3,000
- Total: £750,000

The "rolling 147 prize" for a maximum break stood at £5,000

== Main draw ==
Last 64; Best of 11 frames
(England) Mark Selby	6
(China) Cao Yupeng	4
(England) Tom Ford	6
(Wales) Ian Preece	5
(Wales) Ryan Day	6
(Norway) Kurt Maflin	5
(Wales) Mark Williams	6
(China) Yu Delu	4
(England) Sam Craigie	3
(England) Joe Perry	6
(England) Robbie Williams	w/o
(England) Stuart Bingham	(Note: On 24 October 2017, Bingham was banned for 6 months due to betting breaches.)
(England) Matthew Selt	6
(England) Michael Holt	3
(England) Gary Wilson	2
(Australia) Neil Robertson	6
(England) Shaun Murphy	6
(China) Mei Xiwen	5
(Scotland) Alan McManus	3
(China) Zhang Yong	6
(England) Ali Carter	6
(England) Andrew Higginson	3
(Scotland) Stephen Maguire	6
(England) John Astley	2
(England) David Grace	3
(England) Martin Gould	6
(China) Tian Pengfei	5
(England) Kyren Wilson	6
(England) Robert Milkins	6
(Scotland) Graeme Dott	2
(England) Oliver Lines	6
(China) Ding Junhui	4
(England) Judd Trump	6
(England) Ian Burns	0
(Finland) Robin Hull	5
(England) Jimmy Robertson	6
(China) Liang Wenbo	6
(Wales) Lee Walker	5
(England) David Gilbert	1
(China) Li Hang	6
(England) Rory McLeod	1
(England) Mark King	6
(China) Zhao Xintong	4
(Northern Ireland) Mark Allen	6
(England) Martin O'Donnell	6
(England) Sanderson Lam	3
(Iran) Hossein Vafaei	w/d
(Thailand) Sunny Akani	w/o
(England) Barry Hawkins	2
(England) Jack Lisowski	6
(Scotland) Eden Sharav	2
(China) Xiao Guodong	6
(England) Ronnie O'Sullivan	1
(China) Yan Bingtao	6
(England) Ricky Walden	6
(England) Peter Ebdon	5
(England) Mark Joyce	6
(Scotland) Anthony McGill	2
(China) Li Yuan	1
(Belgium) Luca Brecel	6
(Wales) Dominic Dale	6
(England) Ben Woollaston	3
(China) Niu Zhuang	1
(Scotland) John Higgins	6

Last 32; Best of 11 frames
(England) Mark Selby	6
(England) Tom Ford	4
(Wales) Ryan Day	2
(Wales) Mark Williams	6
(England) Joe Perry	3
(England) Robbie Williams	6
(England) Matthew Selt	5
(Australia) Neil Robertson	6
(England) Shaun Murphy	6
(China) Zhang Yong	1
(England) Ali Carter	6
(Scotland) Stephen Maguire	1
(England) Martin Gould	6
(England) Kyren Wilson	5
(England) Robert Milkins	6
(England) Oliver Lines	4
(England) Judd Trump	6
(England) Jimmy Robertson	3
(China) Liang Wenbo	6
(China) Li Hang	4
(England) Mark King	5
(Northern Ireland) Mark Allen	6
(England) Martin O'Donnell	6
(Thailand) Sunny Akani	5
(England) Jack Lisowski	6
(China) Xiao Guodong	4
(China) Yan Bingtao	6
(England) Ricky Walden	4
(England) Mark Joyce	6
(Belgium) Luca Brecel	2
(Wales) Dominic Dale	2
(Scotland) John Higgins	6

Last 16; Best of 11 frames
(England) Mark Selby	6
(Wales) Mark Williams	4
(England) Robbie Williams	6
(Australia) Neil Robertson	2
(England) Shaun Murphy	2
(England) Ali Carter	6
(England) Martin Gould	6
(England) Robert Milkins	4
(England) Judd Trump	6
(China) Liang Wenbo	3
(Northern Ireland) Mark Allen	6
(England) Martin O'Donnell	5
(England) Jack Lisowski	4
(China) Yan Bingtao	6
(England) Mark Joyce	1
(Scotland) John Higgins	6

Quarter-finals; Best of 11 frames
(England) Mark Selby	6
(England) Robbie Williams	2
(England) Ali Carter	5
(England) Martin Gould	6
(England) Judd Trump	5
(Northern Ireland) Mark Allen	6
(China) Yan Bingtao	6
(Scotland) John Higgins	2

Semi-finals; Best of 17 frames
(England) Mark Selby	9
(England) Martin Gould	3
(Northern Ireland) Mark Allen	9
(China) Yan Bingtao	2

Final; Best of 19 frames
(England) Mark Selby	10
(Northern Ireland) Mark Allen	7

== Final ==
Final: Best of 19 frames. Referee: Jan Verhaas. Baihu Media Broadcasting Centre, Daqing, China, 5 November 2017.
Mark Selby; England	10–7	Mark Allen; Northern Ireland
Afternoon: 72–3 (67), 6–110 (110), 80–11 (50), 91–37 (61), 0–98 (98), 115–0 (55, 60), 67–15, 75–8 (61), 0–137 (137); Evening: 76–0, 83–0 (62), 50–78 (Allen 50), 13–82 (78), 90–5 (90), 50–84 (52), 33–77, 74–7
90	Highest break	137
0	Century breaks	2
8	50+ breaks	6

== Qualifying ==
These matches were held between 26 September and 29 September 2017 at the Preston Guild Hall in Preston, England. Matches involving top players Mark Selby, John Higgins, Ding Junhui and Liang Wenbo were held-over to the main venue, as well as matches involving Chinese players who participated in 2017 Asian Indoor and Martial Arts Games: Zhou Yuelong, Zhao Xintong, Yan Bingtao and Lyu Haotian. These were played on 29 October 2017 in China. All matches were best of 11 frames.

(England) Mark Selby	6–1	(England) Ashley Hugill
(England) Chris Wakelin	2–6	(China) Cao Yupeng
(England) Tom Ford	6–5	(Scotland) Scott Donaldson
(England) Mark Davis	4–6	(Wales) Ian Preece
(Wales) Ryan Day	6–1	(China) Chen Zifan
(Norway) Kurt Maflin	6–2	(Northern Ireland) Joe Swail
(Wales) Mark Williams	6–1	(Thailand) Boonyarit Keattikun
(China) Yu Delu	6–2	(China) Lyu Haotian
(Thailand) Thepchaiya Un-Nooh	5–6	(England) Sam Craigie
(England) Joe Perry	6–3	(England) Paul Davison
(England) Robbie Williams	6–5	(China) Zhang Anda
(England) Stuart Bingham	6–1	(England) Sean O'Sullivan
(England) Matthew Selt	6–5	(Switzerland) Alexander Ursenbacher
(England) Michael Holt	6–1	(Republic of Ireland) Leo Fernandez
(England) Gary Wilson	6–3	(Malaysia) Thor Chuan Leong
(Australia) Neil Robertson	6–2	(England) Craig Steadman
(England) Shaun Murphy	6–0	(Australia) Matthew Bolton
(England) Alfie Burden	1–6	(China) Mei Xiwen
(Scotland) Alan McManus	6–2	(England) Rod Lawler
(Republic of Ireland) Fergal O'Brien	5–6	(China) Zhang Yong
(England) Ali Carter	6–0	(England) Jamie Curtis-Barrett
(England) Andrew Higginson	6–2	(Republic of Ireland) Josh Boileau
(Scotland) Stephen Maguire	6–3	(Malta) Alex Borg
(Wales) Jamie Jones	3–6	(England) John Astley
(England) David Grace	6–2	(China) Xu Si
(England) Martin Gould	6–4	(England) Mitchell Mann
(China) Tian Pengfei	6–3	(Thailand) James Wattana
(England) Kyren Wilson	6–2	(Scotland) Rhys Clark
(England) Robert Milkins	6–4	(China) Yuan Sijun
(Scotland) Graeme Dott	6–2	(England) Nigel Bond
(England) Oliver Lines	6–1	(Pakistan) Hamza Akbar
(China) Ding Junhui	6–3	(China) Chen Zhe

(England) Judd Trump	6–0	(Scotland) Chris Totten
(Wales) Daniel Wells	4–6	(England) Ian Burns
(China) Zhou Yuelong	2–6	(Finland) Robin Hull
(England) Jimmy Robertson	6–3	(Cyprus) Michael Georgiou
(China) Liang Wenbo	6–2	(England) Adam Duffy
(England) Stuart Carrington	5–6	(Wales) Lee Walker
(England) David Gilbert	6–1	(England) Liam Highfield
(China) Li Hang	6–5	(Iran) Soheil Vahedi
(England) Rory McLeod	6–4	(Scotland) Ross Muir
(England) Mark King	6–4	(England) Christopher Keogan
(Wales) Matthew Stevens	2–6	(China) Zhao Xintong
(Northern Ireland) Mark Allen	6–3	(England) Peter Lines
(England) Mike Dunn	0–6	(England) Martin O'Donnell
(England) Anthony Hamilton	w/d–w/o	(England) Sanderson Lam
(Iran) Hossein Vafaei	6–4	(Wales) Duane Jones
(Hong Kong) Marco Fu	4–6	(Thailand) Sunny Akani
(England) Barry Hawkins	6–3	(England) Hammad Miah
(England) Jack Lisowski	6–2	(Germany) Lukas Kleckers
(Wales) Michael White	3–6	(Scotland) Eden Sharav
(China) Xiao Guodong	6–1	(England) Jimmy White
(England) Ronnie O'Sullivan	6–0	(Northern Ireland) Gerard Greene
(China) Yan Bingtao	6–5	(China) Wang Yuchen
(England) Ricky Walden	6–5	(England) Billy Joe Castle
(England) Peter Ebdon	6–4	(China) Fang Xiongman
(England) Mark Joyce	6–4	(Australia) Kurt Dunham
(Scotland) Anthony McGill	6–3	(India) Aditya Mehta
(England) Sam Baird	4–6	(China) Li Yuan
(Belgium) Luca Brecel	6–0	(England) Allan Taylor
(Wales) Dominic Dale	6–2	(Wales) Jackson Page
(England) Ben Woollaston	6–2	(Wales) Jak Jones
(Thailand) Noppon Saengkham	4–6	(China) Niu Zhuang
(Scotland) John Higgins	6–1	(England) Elliot Slessor

== Century breaks ==
=== Qualifying stage centuries ===
Total: 39

- 134 – James Wattana
- 133 – Xiao Guodong
- 133 – Anthony McGill
- 129, 116, 111 – Stephen Maguire
- 129 – Mark Williams
- 128 – Gary Wilson
- 127, 108 – Barry Hawkins
- 127 – Tian Pengfei
- 126 – Marco Fu
- 126 – Kyren Wilson
- 124 – Chris Wakelin
- 122 – Zhang Yong
- 121 – Neil Robertson
- 120 – Tom Ford
- 118 – Stuart Bingham
- 117 – Alfie Burden
- 117 – Kurt Maflin
- 115 – Noppon Saengkham
- 113 – Scott Donaldson
- 112 – Ronnie O'Sullivan
- 110 – Martin O'Donnell
- 109 – Judd Trump
- 108 – Thor Chuan Leong
- 108 – Robert Milkins
- 108 – Mark Allen
- 107 – Zhang Anda
- 106 – Jamie Jones
- 105 – Soheil Vahedi
- 104 – Shaun Murphy
- 104 – Jimmy Robertson
- 103 – Matthew Selt
- 102 – Cao Yupeng
- 101 – Michael White
- 100 – Martin Gould
- 100 – David Grace
- 100 – Ben Woollaston

=== Televised stage centuries ===
Total: 75

- 147, 127, 101 – Kyren Wilson
- 141, 111 – Jimmy Robertson
- 138, 123 – Shaun Murphy
- 137, 131, 117, 114, 110, 105, 102, 100 – Mark Allen
- 136, 136, 131, 128, 106 – Ali Carter
- 135, 127, 127, 118, 115, 110, 109, 105 – Judd Trump
- 133, 122, 114 – Kurt Maflin
- 131 – Robin Hull
- 129, 122, 121, 117, 104, 101 – Neil Robertson
- 129, 127, 119, 115, 108, 102 – Mark Selby
- 129 – Peter Ebdon
- 128, 105, 104 – Martin Gould
- 127 – Zhao Xintong
- 126, 103 – Xiao Guodong
- 125, 112 – Luca Brecel
- 123, 103, 100 – Yan Bingtao
- 121, 101 – Mark Williams
- 118, 109, 103, 100 – Martin O'Donnell
- 118, 104 – Liang Wenbo
- 118 – Ryan Day
- 116, 114, 102 – Jack Lisowski
- 115 – Matthew Selt
- 114, 113 – John Higgins
- 111 – Ronnie O'Sullivan
- 106 – Robbie Williams
- 101 – Sanderson Lam
- 100 – Ricky Walden
