= 2016 World Open (snooker) =

World Open
Tournament information
- Dates: 25–31 July 2016
- Venue: Yushan No.1 Middle School
- City: Yushan
- Country: China
- Organisation: World Snooker
- Format: Ranking event
- Total prize fund: £520,000
- Winner's share: £90,000
- Highest break: John Higgins (SCO) (144)

Final
- Champion: Ali Carter (ENG)
- Runner-up: Joe Perry (ENG)
- Score: 10–8

The 2016 Hanteng Autos World Open was a professional ranking snooker tournament that took place between 25 and 31 July 2016 at the Yushan No.1 Middle School in Yushan, China. It was the third ranking event of the 2016/2017 season.

Shaun Murphy was the defending champion, but he lost 2–5 to Joe Perry in the quarter-finals.

Ali Carter won the fourth ranking title of his career, defeating Perry 10–8 in the final.

== Prize fund ==
The breakdown of prize money for this year is shown below:

- Winner: £90,000
- Runner-up: £40,000
- Semi-final: £21,000
- Quarter-final: £12,500
- Last 16: £8,000
- Last 32: £6,500
- Last 64: £4,000
- Highest break: £2,000
- Total: £520,000

The "rolling 147 prize" for a maximum break stood at £35,000.

== Wildcard round ==
These matches were played in Yushan on 25 July 2016.

Match		Score	
WC1	Hammad Miah (ENG)	3–5	Huang Jiahao (CHN)
WC2	Zhang Anda (CHN)	5–3	Hu Hao (CHN)
WC3	James Wattana (THA)	3–5	Xu Si (CHN)
WC4	Matthew Stevens (WAL)	5–1	Liu Yiqi (CHN)

== Main draw ==
Last 64; Best of 9 frames
(England) Shaun Murphy	5
(China) Cao Yupeng	2
(England) Jimmy Robertson	5
(China) Wang Yuchen	1
(Scotland) Stephen Maguire	4
(China) Xiao Guodong	5
(Wales) Michael White	4
(Norway) Kurt Maflin	5
(England) Tom Ford	5
(England) Mark Davis	4
(Scotland) Jamie Burnett	w/d
(England) Joe Perry	w/o
(England) Gary Wilson	2
(England) Ben Woollaston	5
(Finland) Robin Hull	1
(China) Ding Junhui	5
(Australia) Neil Robertson	5
(England) Ian Burns	2
(Belgium) Luca Brecel	3
(Malaysia) Rory Thor	5
(England) Barry Hawkins	5
(England) Robbie Williams	4
(Wales) Ryan Day	5
(England) Allan Taylor	1
(England) Rod Lawler	0
(England) David Gilbert	5
(China) Zhou Yuelong	5
(China) Huang Jiahao	1
(China) Zhang Anda	5
(England) Peter Ebdon	1
(China) Yu Delu	w/d
(England) Judd Trump	w/o
(England) Stuart Bingham	5
(England) Stuart Carrington	4
(England) Ali Carter	5
(England) Mike Dunn	3
(England) Kyren Wilson	5
(China) Zhang Yong	3
(China) Xu Si	3
(Wales) Daniel Wells	5
(Wales) Duane Jones	4
(Scotland) Graeme Dott	5
(England) Andrew Higginson	1
(Wales) Mark Williams	5
(Republic of Ireland) Fergal O'Brien	2
(England) Michael Holt	5
(England) Oliver Lines	2
(Scotland) John Higgins	5
(England) Ricky Walden	5
(England) David Grace	1
(Scotland) Anthony McGill	5
(Wales) Lee Walker	1
(Hong Kong) Marco Fu	3
(England) Sam Craigie	5
(England) Matthew Selt	5
(Wales) Matthew Stevens	2
(England) Jamie Cope	3
(Scotland) Alan McManus	5
(England) James Cahill	2
(China) Liang Wenbo	5
(England) Mark King	4
(Thailand) Thepchaiya Un-Nooh	5
(England) Alfie Burden	2
(England) Mark Selby	5

Last 32; Best of 9 frames
(England) Shaun Murphy	5
(England) Jimmy Robertson	0
(China) Xiao Guodong	0
(Norway) Kurt Maflin	5
(England) Tom Ford	2
(England) Joe Perry	5
(England) Ben Woollaston	5
(China) Ding Junhui	1
(Australia) Neil Robertson	5
(Malaysia) Rory Thor	1
(England) Barry Hawkins	4
(Wales) Ryan Day	5
(England) David Gilbert	5
(China) Zhou Yuelong	2
(China) Zhang Anda	5
(England) Judd Trump	2
(England) Stuart Bingham	3
(England) Ali Carter	5
(England) Kyren Wilson	0
(Wales) Daniel Wells	5
(Scotland) Graeme Dott	4
(Wales) Mark Williams	5
(England) Michael Holt	4
(Scotland) John Higgins	5
(England) Ricky Walden	1
(Scotland) Anthony McGill	5
(England) Sam Craigie	4
(England) Matthew Selt	5
(Scotland) Alan McManus	5
(China) Liang Wenbo	2
(Thailand) Thepchaiya Un-Nooh	5
(England) Mark Selby	3

Last 16; Best of 9 frames
(England) Shaun Murphy	5
(Norway) Kurt Maflin	1
(England) Joe Perry	5
(England) Ben Woollaston	4
(Australia) Neil Robertson	5
(Wales) Ryan Day	1
(England) David Gilbert	5
(China) Zhang Anda	0
(England) Ali Carter	5
(Wales) Daniel Wells	4
(Wales) Mark Williams	2
(Scotland) John Higgins	5
(Scotland) Anthony McGill	5
(England) Matthew Selt	2
(Scotland) Alan McManus	0
(Thailand) Thepchaiya Un-Nooh	5

Quarter-finals; Best of 9 frames
(England) Shaun Murphy	2
(England) Joe Perry	5
(Australia) Neil Robertson	5
(England) David Gilbert	2
(England) Ali Carter	5
(Scotland) John Higgins	0
(Scotland) Anthony McGill	2
(Thailand) Thepchaiya Un-Nooh	5

Semi-finals; Best of 11 frames
(England) Joe Perry	6
(Australia) Neil Robertson	2
(England) Ali Carter	6
(Thailand) Thepchaiya Un-Nooh	1

Final; Best of 19 frames
(England) Joe Perry	8
(England) Ali Carter	10

== Final ==
Final: Best of 19 frames. Referee: Jan Verhaas. Yushan No.1 Middle School, Yushan, China, 31 July 2016.
Joe Perry; England	8–10	Ali Carter; England
Afternoon: 56–61, 79–0 (54), 73–41 (56), 40–75, 114–22 (78), 0–80 (80), 18–68 (54), 50–70, 0–91 (91); Evening: 17–115 (53, 61), 58–70 (58, 70), 70–33, 131–0 (131), 40–75, 123–4 (106), 68–34, 92–0 (92), 0–127 (127)
131	Highest break	127
2	Century breaks	1
7	50+ breaks	7

== Qualifying ==
These matches were held between 31 May and 2 June 2016 at the Preston Guild Hall in Preston, England. All matches were best of 9 frames.

(England) Shaun Murphy	5–1 (Note: Match was held over and played in Yushan.)	(England) Sanderson Lam
(England) Martin O'Donnell	4–5	(China) Cao Yupeng
(England) Jimmy Robertson	5–2	(Scotland) Fraser Patrick
(Wales) Jamie Jones	2–5	(China) Wang Yuchen
(Scotland) Stephen Maguire	5–0	(China) Fang Xiongman
(China) Xiao Guodong	5–0	(Australia) Kurt Dunham
(Wales) Michael White	5–4	(England) Anthony Hamilton
(Norway) Kurt Maflin	5–1	(Wales) David John
(England) Tom Ford	5–2	(England) Christopher Keogan
(England) Mark Davis	5–0	(Scotland) Rhys Clark
(Scotland) Jamie Burnett	5–3	(Scotland) Ross Muir
(England) Joe Perry	5–3	(Iran) Hossein Vafaei
(England) Gary Wilson	5–0	(England) John Astley
(England) Ben Woollaston	5–3	(China) Yan Bingtao
(Finland) Robin Hull	5–1	(England) Elliot Slessor
(China) Ding Junhui	5–3	(Cyprus) Michael Georgiou
(Australia) Neil Robertson	5–4	(England) Sydney Wilson
(England) Ian Burns	5–3	(England) Steven Hallworth
(Belgium) Luca Brecel	5–4	(England) Peter Lines
(England) Jack Lisowski	2–5	(Malaysia) Rory Thor
(England) Barry Hawkins	5–0	(China) Zhao Xintong
(England) Robbie Williams	5–1	(Isle of Man) Darryl Hill
(Wales) Ryan Day	5–1	(Pakistan) Hamza Akbar
(England) Sam Baird	3–5	(England) Allan Taylor
(England) Rod Lawler	5–3	(England) Nigel Bond
(England) David Gilbert	5–3	(England) Michael Wild
(China) Zhou Yuelong	5–4	(Thailand) Sunny Akani
(England) Martin Gould	4–5	(England) Hammad Miah
(Wales) Dominic Dale	1–5	(China) Zhang Anda
(England) Peter Ebdon	5–1	(Malta) Alex Borg
(China) Yu Delu	5–3	(Wales) Ian Preece
(England) Judd Trump	5–1	(England) Brandon Sargeant

(England) Stuart Bingham	5–3	(Scotland) Eden Sharav
(England) Stuart Carrington	5–2	(England) Adam Duffy
(England) Ali Carter	5–4	(England) Liam Highfield
(England) Mike Dunn	5–4	(Thailand) Boonyarit Keattikun
(England) Kyren Wilson	5–1	(England) Andy Hicks
(Northern Ireland) Joe Swail	1–5	(China) Zhang Yong
(England) Robert Milkins	2–5	(Thailand) James Wattana
(China) Tian Pengfei	0–5	(Wales) Daniel Wells
(Thailand) Dechawat Poomjaeng	3–5	(Wales) Duane Jones
(Scotland) Graeme Dott	w/o–w/d	(Republic of Ireland) Leo Fernandez
(England) Andrew Higginson	5–1	(Poland) Adam Stefanow
(Wales) Mark Williams	5–1	(Scotland) Scott Donaldson
(Republic of Ireland) Fergal O'Brien	5–3	(England) Craig Steadman
(England) Michael Holt	5–0	(China) Chen Zhe
(England) Oliver Lines	5–3	(England) Mitchell Mann
(Scotland) John Higgins	5–0	(Wales) Gareth Allen
(England) Ricky Walden	5–2	(England) Jason Weston
(England) David Grace	5–4	(England) Paul Davison
(Scotland) Anthony McGill	5–1	(Brazil) Itaro Santos
(England) Mark Joyce	3–5	(Wales) Lee Walker
(Hong Kong) Marco Fu	5–3	(England) Ashley Hugill
(Republic of Ireland) Ken Doherty	3–5	(England) Sam Craigie
(England) Matthew Selt	5–0	(Wales) Jak Jones
(Wales) Matthew Stevens	5–1	(Republic of Ireland) Josh Boileau
(England) Rory McLeod	2–5	(England) Jamie Cope
(Scotland) Alan McManus	5–0	(Egypt) Hatem Yassen
(China) Li Hang	4–5	(England) James Cahill
(China) Liang Wenbo	5–1	(England) Chris Wakelin
(England) Mark King	5–4	(England) Sean O'Sullivan
(Thailand) Thepchaiya Un-Nooh	5–0	(Thailand) Noppon Saengkham
(England) Alfie Burden	5–2	(England) Daniel Womersley
(England) Mark Selby	5–1	(England) Jimmy White

== Century breaks ==
=== Qualifying stage centuries ===
- 142 – Barry Hawkins
- 141 – Jimmy Robertson
- 136 – Thepchaiya Un-Nooh
- 136 – Marco Fu
- 135, 124 – Li Hang
- 134 – Ben Woollaston
- 133, 101 – Kurt Maflin
- 126 – Hammad Miah
- 125 – Ali Carter
- 122 – Sam Baird
- 118 – Matthew Selt
- 113 – Mitchell Mann
- 112 – Tom Ford
- 110 – Ian Burns
- 109 – Daniel Womersley
- 107 – Ryan Day
- 107 – Ashley Hugill
- 106 – Sunny Akani
- 103 – Anthony McGill
- 102 – Alan McManus
- 102 – Yan Bingtao
- 101 – John Higgins
- 100 – Sydney Wilson

=== Televised stage centuries ===
- 144, 116, 112 – John Higgins
- 141, 115, 109, 106 – Anthony McGill
- 140 – Matthew Selt
- 139, 111 – Graeme Dott
- 139 – Liang Wenbo
- 137, 106, 104, 102, 100 – Neil Robertson
- 135, 101 – Mark Williams
- 135, 100 – Ben Woollaston
- 135 – Zhang Anda
- 133 – Stephen Maguire
- 132, 131, 120, 107, 106, 102 – Joe Perry
- 130, 127, 101 – Ali Carter
- 127, 125, 123, 107, 100 – David Gilbert
- 127 – Fergal O'Brien
- 125, 125, 104 – Thepchaiya Un-Nooh
- 125, 120 – Michael White
- 124 – Xiao Guodong
- 122, 109 – Matthew Stevens
- 117 – Ding Junhui
- 115, 101 – Ryan Day
- 115 – Kurt Maflin
- 112 – Sam Craigie
- 111 – Daniel Wells
- 106 – Shaun Murphy
- 105 – Kyren Wilson
- 103 – Ricky Walden
- 102 – Mark Selby
- 101 – Jamie Cope
- 100 – Alan McManus
