= 2016 Indian Open =

Indian Open
Tournament information
- Dates: 5–9 July 2016
- Venue: HICC Novotel Hotel
- City: Hyderabad
- Country: India
- Organisation: World Snooker
- Format: Ranking event
- Total prize fund: £300,000
- Winner's share: £50,000
- Highest break: Mark King (ENG) (142)

Final
- Champion: Anthony McGill (SCO)
- Runner-up: Kyren Wilson (ENG)
- Score: 5–2

The 2016 Indian Open was a professional ranking snooker tournament that took place between 5–9 July 2016 at the HICC Novotel Hotel in Hyderabad, India. It was the second ranking event of the 2016/2017 season.

Hyderabad hosted the event for the first time, the previous venue being Grand Hyatt in Mumbai.

Michael White was the defending champion, but he lost 1–4 against Anthony Hamilton in the held over qualifying round.

Anthony McGill won the first ranking title of his career, defeating Kyren Wilson 5–2 in the final.

== Prize fund ==
The breakdown of prize money for this year is shown below:

- Winner: £50,000
- Runner-up: £25,000
- Semi-final: £13,500
- Quarter-final: £9,000
- Last 16: £6,000
- Last 32: £3,000
- Last 64: £2,000
- Televised highest break: £2,000
- Total: £300,000

The "rolling 147 prize" for a maximum break stood at £30,000.

== Wildcard round ==
These matches were played in Hyderabad on 5 July 2016.

Match		Score	
WC1	Zhao Xintong (CHN)	4–2	Kamal Chawla (IND)
WC2	Hamza Akbar (PAK)	w/d–w/o	Dilip Kumar (IND)
WC3	Fraser Patrick (SCO)	w/d–w/o	Ishpreet Singh Chadha (IND)
WC4	Andrew Higginson (ENG)	4–1	Manan Chandra (IND)
WC5	Fang Xiongman (CHN)	2–4	Pankaj Advani (IND)
WC6	David Grace (ENG)	4–1	Lucky Vatnani (IND)

== Main draw ==
Last 64; Best of 7 frames
(England) Anthony Hamilton	4
(Scotland) Eden Sharav	3
(England) Gary Wilson	4
(China) Zhao Xintong	1
(England) Mark Davis	4
(Finland) Robin Hull	3
(Thailand) Sunny Akani	4
(Scotland) Jamie Burnett	1
(China) Xiao Guodong	4
(England) Jimmy Robertson	3
(England) Martin O'Donnell	3
(England) Kyren Wilson	4
(Thailand) James Wattana	3
(Wales) Jamie Jones	4
(England) Allan Taylor	0
(England) Martin Gould	4
(Hong Kong) Marco Fu	4
(India) Dilip Kumar	0
(Wales) Dominic Dale	4
(India) Ishpreet Singh Chadha	2
(England) Liam Highfield	3
(Wales) Duane Jones	4
(England) Peter Ebdon	4
(China) Zhou Yuelong	1
(England) Robbie Williams	w/o
(Belgium) Luca Brecel	w/d
(England) John Astley	4
(Wales) Ryan Day	3
(England) Sam Baird	4
(England) Jack Lisowski	3
(England) Nigel Bond	4
(England) Ricky Walden	1
(England) Shaun Murphy	4
(Wales) Daniel Wells	1
(Cyprus) Michael Georgiou	4
(Thailand) Dechawat Poomjaeng	2
(Scotland) Graeme Dott	1
(England) Oliver Lines	4
(England) Mitchell Mann	1
(England) Andrew Higginson	4
(Northern Ireland) Joe Swail	4
(England) Jimmy White	2
(England) Stuart Carrington	1
(England) Robert Milkins	4
(England) David Lilley	4
(England) Mike Dunn	2
(China) Zhang Yong	1
(Wales) Mark Williams	4
(England) Barry Hawkins	4
(England) Ashley Hugill	0
(England) Mark King	1
(England) Rory McLeod	4
(Scotland) Stephen Maguire	4
(England) Alfie Burden	0
(England) Elliot Slessor	0
(India) Pankaj Advani	4
(England) Oliver Brown	1
(Scotland) Anthony McGill	4
(England) David Grace	2
(England) Matthew Selt	4
(Wales) Matthew Stevens	4
(England) Mark Joyce	2
(England) Steven Hallworth	3
(England) Stuart Bingham	4

Last 32; Best of 7 frames
(England) Anthony Hamilton	2
(England) Gary Wilson	4
(England) Mark Davis	2
(Thailand) Sunny Akani	4
(China) Xiao Guodong	3
(England) Kyren Wilson	4
(Wales) Jamie Jones	2
(England) Martin Gould	4
(Hong Kong) Marco Fu	0
(Wales) Dominic Dale	4
(Wales) Duane Jones	1
(England) Peter Ebdon	4
(England) Robbie Williams	2
(England) John Astley	4
(England) Sam Baird	2
(England) Nigel Bond	4
(England) Shaun Murphy	4
(Cyprus) Michael Georgiou	3
(England) Oliver Lines	4
(England) Andrew Higginson	2
(Northern Ireland) Joe Swail	1
(England) Robert Milkins	4
(England) David Lilley	4
(Wales) Mark Williams	3
(England) Barry Hawkins	4
(England) Rory McLeod	2
(Scotland) Stephen Maguire	4
(India) Pankaj Advani	3
(Scotland) Anthony McGill	4
(England) Matthew Selt	2
(Wales) Matthew Stevens	3
(England) Stuart Bingham	4

Last 16; Best of 7 frames
(England) Gary Wilson	2
(Thailand) Sunny Akani	4
(England) Kyren Wilson	4
(England) Martin Gould	2
(Wales) Dominic Dale	1
(England) Peter Ebdon	4
(England) John Astley	2
(England) Nigel Bond	4
(England) Shaun Murphy	4
(England) Oliver Lines	2
(England) Robert Milkins	2
(England) David Lilley	4
(England) Barry Hawkins	3
(Scotland) Stephen Maguire	4
(Scotland) Anthony McGill	4
(England) Stuart Bingham	0

Quarter-finals; Best of 7 frames
(Thailand) Sunny Akani	2
(England) Kyren Wilson	4
(England) Peter Ebdon	3
(England) Nigel Bond	4
(England) Shaun Murphy	4
(England) David Lilley	2
(Scotland) Stephen Maguire	1
(Scotland) Anthony McGill	4

Semi-finals; Best of 7 frames
(England) Kyren Wilson	4
(England) Nigel Bond	1
(England) Shaun Murphy	2
(Scotland) Anthony McGill	4

Final; Best of 9 frames
(England) Kyren Wilson	2
(Scotland) Anthony McGill	5

== Final ==
Final: Best of 9 frames. Referee: Marcel Eckardt. HICC Novotel Hotel, Hyderabad, India, 9 July 2016.
Kyren Wilson; England	2–5	Anthony McGill; Scotland
28–86, 88–16 (65), 27–83, 61–49 (50), 25–97 (96), 12–60, 39–50
65	Highest break	96
0	Century breaks	0
2	50+ breaks	1

== Qualifying ==
These matches were held between 28 and 30 May 2016 at the Preston Guild Hall in Preston, England. All matches were best of 7 frames.

(Wales) Michael White	1–4 (Note: Match was held over and played in Hyderabad.)	(England) Anthony Hamilton
(England) Sean O'Sullivan	1–4	(Scotland) Eden Sharav
(England) Gary Wilson	4–1	(Scotland) Rhys Clark
(England) Tom Ford	3–4	(China) Zhao Xintong
(England) Mark Davis	4–0	(England) James Cahill
(Finland) Robin Hull	4–1	(England) Brandon Sargeant
(England) Ben Woollaston	3–4	(Thailand) Sunny Akani
(Scotland) Jamie Burnett	4–1	(England) Craig Steadman
(China) Xiao Guodong	4–2	(China) Wang Yuchen
(England) Jimmy Robertson	4–0	(India) Aditya Mehta
(England) Martin O'Donnell	4–2	(Malaysia) Rory Thor
(England) Kyren Wilson	4–0	(Egypt) Hatem Yassen
(Norway) Kurt Maflin	1–4	(Thailand) James Wattana
(Wales) Jamie Jones	4–2	(England) Jason Weston
(England) Jamie Cope	3–4	(England) Allan Taylor
(England) Martin Gould	4–1	(England) Christopher Keogan
(Hong Kong) Marco Fu	4–2	(England) Louis Heathcote
(England) Chris Wakelin	1–4	(Pakistan) Hamza Akbar
(Wales) Dominic Dale	4–0	(England) Adam Duffy
(England) Rod Lawler	2–4	(Scotland) Fraser Patrick
(England) David Gilbert	2–4	(England) Liam Highfield
(China) Yu Delu	2–4	(Wales) Duane Jones
(England) Peter Ebdon	4–1	(England) Daniel Womersley
(China) Zhou Yuelong	4–3	(Wales) Gareth Allen
(England) Robbie Williams	4–2	(England) Peter Lines
(Belgium) Luca Brecel	4–2	(England) Hammad Miah
(England) Ian Burns	2–4	(England) John Astley
(Wales) Ryan Day	4–0	(England) Sanderson Lam
(England) Sam Baird	4–0	(Malta) Alex Borg
(England) Jack Lisowski	4–1	(England) Michael Wild
(England) Nigel Bond	4–0	(England) Joshua Thomond
(England) Ricky Walden	4–1	(China) Zhang Anda

(England) Shaun Murphy	4–0	(China) Lu Chenwei
(Wales) Daniel Wells	4–0	(Isle of Man) Darryl Hill
(Republic of Ireland) Fergal O'Brien	3–4	(Cyprus) Michael Georgiou
(Thailand) Dechawat Poomjaeng	4–0	(Brazil) Itaro Santos
(Scotland) Graeme Dott	4–3	(Scotland) Michael Collumb
(England) Oliver Lines	4–0	(Scotland) Marc Davis
(England) Michael Holt	1–4	(England) Mitchell Mann
(England) Andrew Higginson	4–2	(China) Yan Bingtao
(Northern Ireland) Joe Swail	4–1	(Australia) Kurt Dunham
(England) Ali Carter	1–4	(England) Jimmy White
(England) Stuart Carrington	4–1	(England) Sydney Wilson
(England) Robert Milkins	4–1	(Thailand) Boonyarit Keattikun
(China) Tian Pengfei	3–4	(England) David Lilley
(England) Mike Dunn	4–2	(Wales) Ian Preece
(Thailand) Noppon Saengkham	2–4	(China) Zhang Yong
(Wales) Mark Williams	4–1	(Wales) David John
(England) Barry Hawkins	4–3	(Scotland) Scott Donaldson
(Scotland) Ross Muir	2–4	(England) Ashley Hugill
(England) Mark King	4–1	(Wales) Lee Walker
(England) Rory McLeod	4–2	(England) Andy Hicks
(Scotland) Stephen Maguire	4–0	(England) Charlie Walters
(England) Alfie Burden	4–0	(England) Paul Davison
(Thailand) Thepchaiya Un-Nooh	2–4	(England) Elliot Slessor
(China) Li Hang	2–4	(China) Fang Xiongman
(Republic of Ireland) Ken Doherty	3–4	(England) Oliver Brown
(Scotland) Anthony McGill	4–0	(China) Chen Zhe
(England) David Grace	4–1	(England) Sam Craigie
(England) Matthew Selt	4–0	(England) Gareth Green
(Wales) Matthew Stevens	4–1	(Poland) Adam Stefanow
(England) Mark Joyce	w/o–w/d	(Republic of Ireland) Leo Fernandez
(Iran) Hossein Vafaei	3–4	(England) Steven Hallworth
(England) Stuart Bingham	4–0	(China) Cao Yupeng

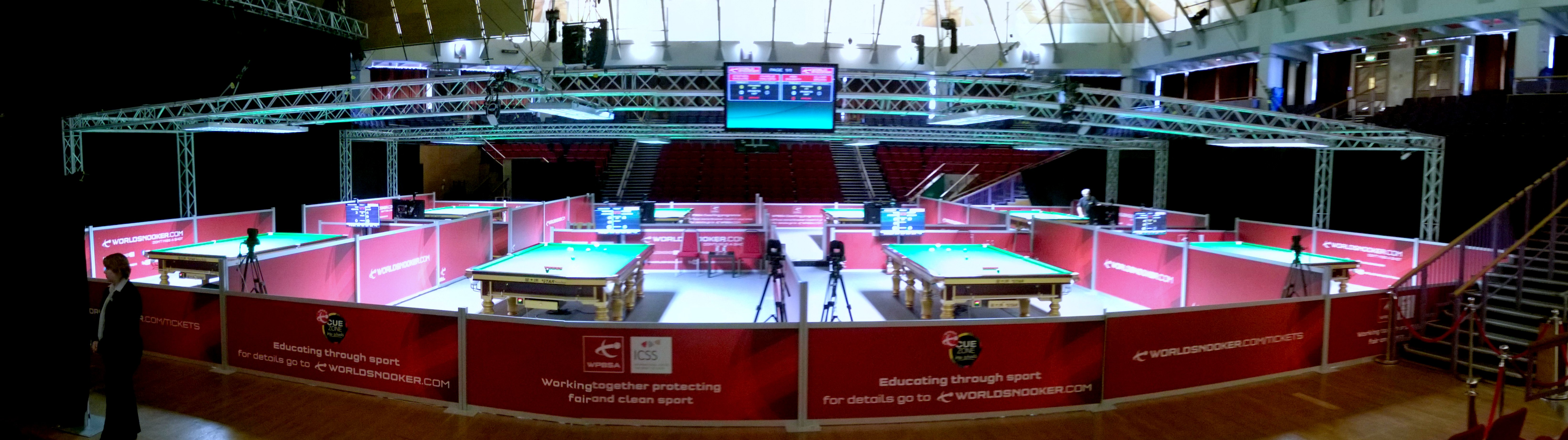
Interior of the Preston Guild Hall during the qualifying round

== Century breaks ==
=== Televised stage centuries ===
Total: 23

- 142 – Mark King
- 140 – Robert Milkins
- 137 – Ryan Day
- 128 – David Grace
- 127, 125 – Anthony Hamilton
- 125 – Kyren Wilson
- 124 – Robin Hull
- 116 – Rory McLeod
- 114, 101 – Xiao Guodong
- 113 – Stuart Bingham
- 112 – Anthony McGill
- 109, 101 – Shaun Murphy
- 109 – Martin Gould
- 106 – Matthew Stevens
- 106 – Nigel Bond
- 104 – Sunny Akani
- 104 – Stephen Maguire
- 104 – Marco Fu
- 102 – Barry Hawkins
- 100 – Matthew Selt

=== Qualifying stage centuries ===
Total: 9

- 138 – Kurt Maflin
- 132 – Alfie Burden
- 115 – Duane Jones
- 110 – Mark Williams
- 110 – Stuart Bingham
- 105 – Luca Brecel
- 101 – Robbie Williams
- 101 – Rory McLeod
- 100 – Martin O'Donnell
