= 2019 Welsh Open (snooker) =

2019 ManBetX Welsh Open
Tournament information
- Dates: 11–17 February 2019
- Venue: Motorpoint Arena
- City: Cardiff
- Country: Wales
- Organisation: World Snooker
- Format: Ranking event
- Total prize fund: £366,000
- Winner's share: £70,000
- Highest break: Neil Robertson (AUS) (147); Noppon Saengkham (THA) (147)

Final
- Champion: Neil Robertson (AUS)
- Runner-up: Stuart Bingham (ENG)
- Score: 9–7

The 2019 Welsh Open (officially the 2019 ManBetX Welsh Open) was a professional ranking snooker tournament which took place from 11 to 17 February 2019 at the Motorpoint Arena in Cardiff, Wales. It was the thirteenth ranking event of the 2018/2019 season, and the final event of the season's Home Nations Series.

John Higgins was the defending champion, having beaten Barry Hawkins 9–7 in the 2018 final, but he was defeated 3–5 by Joe O'Connor in the quarter-finals.

Neil Robertson won the event, gaining his fifteenth ranking title, and his second Home Nations triumph since the re-brand in 2016, becoming the second player to claim two Home Nations victories after Stuart Bingham, whom he defeated 9–7 in the final. Bingham made eleven centuries throughout the tournament, while Robertson made the fourth 147 break of his career in the fourth frame of his Round 1 match with Jordan Brown, followed by a 140 break to win the match 4–1.

Noppon Saengkham made his first ever professionally recorded 147 break in the second frame of his third round match against Mark Selby. It was the fifth time two maximums had been made during the main stages of a ranking event, and the fourth time inside a year.

== Prize fund ==
The breakdown of prize money for this year is shown below:

- Winner: £70,000
- Runner-up: £30,000
- Semi-final: £20,000
- Quarter-final: £10,000
- Last 16: £6,000
- Last 32: £3,500
- Last 64: £2,500
- Highest break: £2,000
- Total: £366,000

The "rolling 147 prize" for a maximum break: £15,000

== Main draw ==
=== Top half ===
==== Section 1 ====
Last 128; Best of 7 frames
(Scotland) John Higgins (1)	4
(Scotland) Graeme Dott	0
(China) Li Yuan	2
(Wales) Dominic Dale	4
(Iran) Soheil Vahedi	4
(China) Chen Feilong	0
(England) Alfie Burden	2
(England) Craig Steadman	4
(England) Jack Lisowski (16)	4
(China) Niu Zhuang	3
(China) Tian Pengfei	1
(Hong Kong) Marco Fu	4
(England) Sean O'Sullivan	1
(Republic of Ireland) Ken Doherty	4
(England) Sam Craigie	4
(England) Mark King	0

Last 64; Best of 7 frames
(Scotland) John Higgins (1)	4
(Wales) Dominic Dale	2
(Iran) Soheil Vahedi	1
(England) Craig Steadman	4
(England) Jack Lisowski (16)	4
(Hong Kong) Marco Fu	3
(Republic of Ireland) Ken Doherty	1
(England) Sam Craigie	4

Last 32; Best of 7 frames
(Scotland) John Higgins (1)	4
(England) Craig Steadman	2
(England) Jack Lisowski (16)	4
(England) Sam Craigie	3

Last 16; Best of 7 frames
(Scotland) John Higgins (1)	4
(England) Jack Lisowski (16)	3

==== Section 2 ====
Last 128; Best of 7 frames
(England) Chris Wakelin	3
(England) Hammad Miah	4
(England) Mark Davis	3
(England) Joe Perry	4
(Republic of Ireland) Fergal O'Brien	2
(England) Oliver Lines	4
(China) Ding Junhui (9)	4
(Scotland) Chris Totten	0
(Wales) Jak Jones	4
(Wales) Matthew Stevens	2
(Wales) Michael White	2
(England) Peter Lines	4
(England) Joe O'Connor	4
(Scotland) Rhys Clark	2
(England) Kyren Wilson (8)	4
(Hong Kong) Andy Lee	0

Last 64; Best of 7 frames
(England) Hammad Miah	3
(England) Joe Perry	4
(England) Oliver Lines	3
(China) Ding Junhui (9)	4
(Wales) Jak Jones	4
(England) Peter Lines	3
(England) Joe O'Connor	4
(England) Kyren Wilson (8)	3

Last 32; Best of 7 frames
(England) Joe Perry	2
(China) Ding Junhui (9)	4
(Wales) Jak Jones	1
(England) Joe O'Connor	4

Last 16; Best of 7 frames
(China) Ding Junhui (9)	1
(England) Joe O'Connor	4

==== Section 3 ====
Last 128; Best of 7 frames
(England) Judd Trump (5)	4
(England) Harvey Chandler	0
(China) Xiao Guodong	3
(Wales) Duane Jones	4
(England) Robbie Williams	4
(England) Rod Lawler	0
(England) Anthony Hamilton	4
(England) Sam Baird	0
(England) Stuart Bingham (12)	4
(England) Ali Carter	0
(Wales) Jamie Clarke	2
(England) Matthew Selt	4
(England) Martin O'Donnell	4
(Pakistan) Hamza Akbar	0
(England) Ricky Walden	4
(Wales) Lee Walker	2

Last 64; Best of 7 frames
(England) Judd Trump (5)	2
(Wales) Duane Jones	4
(England) Robbie Williams	4
(England) Anthony Hamilton	1
(England) Stuart Bingham (12)	4
(England) Matthew Selt	1
(England) Martin O'Donnell	4
(England) Ricky Walden	1

Last 32; Best of 7 frames
(Wales) Duane Jones	0
(England) Robbie Williams	4
(England) Stuart Bingham (12)	4
(England) Martin O'Donnell	1

Last 16; Best of 7 frames
(England) Robbie Williams	2
(England) Stuart Bingham (12)	4

==== Section 4 ====
Last 128; Best of 7 frames
(England) David Gilbert	3
(England) Jimmy Robertson	4
(England) Nigel Bond	4
(Scotland) Alan McManus	3
(China) Zhao Xintong	4
(Wales) Jackson Page	1
(Scotland) Stephen Maguire (13)	3
(China) Zhou Yuelong	4
(China) Zhang Jiankang	4
(China) Fan Zhengyi	3
(Switzerland) Alexander Ursenbacher	4
(China) Yan Bingtao	2
(England) Allan Taylor	0
(China) Yuan Sijun	4
(England) Ronnie O'Sullivan (4)	4
(England) Sanderson Lam	2

Last 64; Best of 7 frames
(England) Jimmy Robertson	4
(England) Nigel Bond	3
(China) Zhao Xintong	4
(China) Zhou Yuelong	0
(China) Zhang Jiankang	1
(Switzerland) Alexander Ursenbacher	4
(China) Yuan Sijun	2
(England) Ronnie O'Sullivan (4)	4

Last 32; Best of 7 frames
(England) Jimmy Robertson	2
(China) Zhao Xintong	4
(Switzerland) Alexander Ursenbacher	4
(England) Ronnie O'Sullivan (4)	2

Last 16; Best of 7 frames
(China) Zhao Xintong	4
(Switzerland) Alexander Ursenbacher	2

=== Bottom half ===
==== Section 5 ====
Last 128; Best of 7 frames
(England) Mark Selby (3)	4
(Scotland) Anthony McGill	2
(England) Adam Duffy	4
(China) Zhang Yong	2
(Israel) Eden Sharav	2
(China) Xu Si	4
(England) Stuart Carrington	3
(Thailand) Noppon Saengkham	4
(Wales) Ryan Day (14)	3
(Thailand) Thepchaiya Un-Nooh	4
(Germany) Lukas Kleckers	4
(England) Peter Ebdon	0
(England) Ashley Hugill	3
(Iran) Hossein Vafaei	4
(Scotland) Ross Muir	4
(Wales) Daniel Wells	2

Last 64; Best of 7 frames
(England) Mark Selby (3)	4
(England) Adam Duffy	0
(China) Xu Si	1
(Thailand) Noppon Saengkham	4
(Thailand) Thepchaiya Un-Nooh	3
(Germany) Lukas Kleckers	4
(Iran) Hossein Vafaei	4
(Scotland) Ross Muir	3

Last 32; Best of 7 frames
(England) Mark Selby (3)	4
(Thailand) Noppon Saengkham	1
(Germany) Lukas Kleckers	2
(Iran) Hossein Vafaei	4

Last 16; Best of 7 frames
(England) Mark Selby (3)	3
(Iran) Hossein Vafaei	4

==== Section 6 ====
Last 128; Best of 7 frames
(Scotland) Scott Donaldson	4
(England) John Astley	2
(Northern Ireland) Joe Swail	4
(China) Li Hang	2
(England) James Cahill	4
(Northern Ireland) Gerard Greene	2
(England) Shaun Murphy (11)	4
(Poland) Adam Stefanow	1
(China) Luo Honghao	1
(England) Ian Burns	4
(England) Liam Highfield	3
(China) Liang Wenbo	4
(China) Mei Xiwen	4
(England) Michael Holt	3
(Northern Ireland) Mark Allen (6)	4
(England) Mark Joyce	2

Last 64; Best of 7 frames
(Scotland) Scott Donaldson	4
(Northern Ireland) Joe Swail	3
(England) James Cahill	4
(England) Shaun Murphy (11)	2
(England) Ian Burns	4
(China) Liang Wenbo	3
(China) Mei Xiwen	1
(Northern Ireland) Mark Allen (6)	4

Last 32; Best of 7 frames
(Scotland) Scott Donaldson	4
(England) James Cahill	0
(England) Ian Burns	4
(Northern Ireland) Mark Allen (6)	2

Last 16; Best of 7 frames
(Scotland) Scott Donaldson	4
(England) Ian Burns	2

==== Section 7 ====
Last 128; Best of 7 frames
(England) Barry Hawkins (7)	4
(Thailand) Sunny Akani	0
(China) Lu Ning	1
(England) Ben Woollaston	4
(Cyprus) Michael Georgiou	4
(England) David Lilley	0
(England) Jimmy White	4
(England) Andrew Higginson	2
(Australia) Neil Robertson (10)	4
(Northern Ireland) Jordan Brown	1
(England) Gary Wilson	4
(Finland) Robin Hull	0
(England) Rory McLeod	0
(Malaysia) Thor Chuan Leong	4
(China) Lyu Haotian	1
(England) Paul Davison	4

Last 64; Best of 7 frames
(England) Barry Hawkins (7)	4
(England) Ben Woollaston	2
(Cyprus) Michael Georgiou	4
(England) Jimmy White	1
(Australia) Neil Robertson (10)	4
(England) Gary Wilson	1
(Malaysia) Thor Chuan Leong	3
(England) Paul Davison	4

Last 32; Best of 7 frames
(England) Barry Hawkins (7)	2
(Cyprus) Michael Georgiou	4
(Australia) Neil Robertson (10)	4
(England) Paul Davison	3

Last 16; Best of 7 frames
(Cyprus) Michael Georgiou	0
(Australia) Neil Robertson (10)	4

==== Section 8 ====
Last 128; Best of 7 frames
(England) Robert Milkins	0
(England) Mike Dunn	4
(Thailand) James Wattana	4
(China) Chen Zifan	3
(England) Billy Joe Castle	4
(Germany) Simon Lichtenberg	3
(Belgium) Luca Brecel (15)	2
(Norway) Kurt Maflin	4
(Wales) Alex Taubman	2
(England) Elliot Slessor	4
(England) Ashley Carty	2
(England) Tom Ford	4
(England) Martin Gould	3
(China) Zhang Anda	4
(Wales) Mark Williams (2)	4
(Wales) Kishan Hirani	3

Last 64; Best of 7 frames
(England) Mike Dunn	4
(Thailand) James Wattana	3
(England) Billy Joe Castle	1
(Norway) Kurt Maflin	4
(England) Elliot Slessor	4
(England) Tom Ford	0
(China) Zhang Anda	4
(Wales) Mark Williams (2)	2

Last 32; Best of 7 frames
(England) Mike Dunn	0
(Norway) Kurt Maflin	4
(England) Elliot Slessor	4
(China) Zhang Anda	2

Last 16; Best of 7 frames
(Norway) Kurt Maflin	4
(England) Elliot Slessor	2

=== Finals ===
Quarter-finals; Best of 9 frames
(Scotland) John Higgins (1)	3
(England) Joe O'Connor	5
(England) Stuart Bingham (12)	5
(China) Zhao Xintong	2
(Iran) Hossein Vafaei	5
(Scotland) Scott Donaldson	1
(Australia) Neil Robertson (10)	5
(Norway) Kurt Maflin	4

Semi-finals; Best of 11 frames
(England) Joe O'Connor	2
(England) Stuart Bingham (12)	6
(Iran) Hossein Vafaei	0
(Australia) Neil Robertson (10)	6

Final; Best of 17 frames
(England) Stuart Bingham (12)	7
(Australia) Neil Robertson (10)	9

== Final ==
Final: Best of 17 frames. Referee: Rob Spencer. Motorpoint Arena, Cardiff, Wales, 17 February 2019.
Stuart Bingham (12); England	7–9	Neil Robertson (10); Australia
Afternoon: 21–72, 42–75, 69–29, 34–97, 6–72, 79–22, 13–70, 122–1 (102); Evening: 53–65, 26–92, 96–8, 60–58, 78–1, 87–9, 36–61, 0–83
102	Highest break	83
1	Century breaks	0

== Century breaks ==
Total: 81

- 147, 140, 140, 136, 103 – Neil Robertson
- 147, 102 – Noppon Saengkham
- 140, 134, 127, 122, 115, 101 – Jack Lisowski
- 140, 108 – Liam Highfield
- 139, 135, 128, 115, 107 – Mark Selby
- 139 – Lyu Haotian
- 136, 127, 121 – Joe Perry
- 135, 132, 129, 106, 104, 103 – Zhao Xintong
- 134, 128, 125, 124, 119, 112, 107, 104, 103, 102, 100 – Stuart Bingham
- 131 – Joe O'Connor
- 131 – Lukas Kleckers
- 131 – Mei Xiwen
- 130, 110 – Scott Donaldson
- 128 – Matthew Selt
- 127, 100 – Elliot Slessor
- 126 – Kishan Hirani
- 125, 102 – Robbie Williams
- 122 – Alan McManus
- 120, 118, 116 – Ronnie O'Sullivan
- 120, 104 – Kurt Maflin
- 118, 118 – Oliver Lines
- 116 – Lu Ning
- 115 – James Cahill
- 113 – Martin O'Donnell
- 106, 103 – John Higgins
- 106 – Hossein Vafaei
- 105 – Anthony McGill
- 105 – Thor Chuan Leong
- 105 – Lee Walker
- 104, 103, 102 – Ian Burns
- 104 – Sean O'Sullivan
- 104 – Jackson Page
- 104 – Jimmy Robertson
- 104 – Xiao Guodong
- 103 – Sam Craigie
- 103 – Hammad Miah
- 102 – Shaun Murphy
- 100 – Mark Allen
- 100 – Michael Georgiou
