= 2017 Scottish Open (snooker) =

2017 Dafabet Scottish Open
Tournament information
- Dates: 11–17 December 2017
- Venue: Emirates Arena
- City: Glasgow
- Country: Scotland
- Organisation: World Snooker
- Format: Ranking event
- Total prize fund: £366,000
- Winner's share: £70,000
- Highest break: Cao Yupeng (CHN) (147)

Final
- Champion: Neil Robertson (AUS)
- Runner-up: Cao Yupeng (CHN)
- Score: 9–8

The 2017 Scottish Open (officially the 2017 Dafabet Scottish Open) was a professional ranking snooker tournament that took place from 11 to 17 December 2017 at the Emirates Arena in Glasgow, Scotland. It was the twelfth ranking event of the 2017/2018 season and a part of the Home Nations Series.

Marco Fu was the defending champion, but he lost 4–3 to Xiao Guodong in the last 16.

Neil Robertson won the tournament, coming from 4–8 down to win 9–8 in the final against Cao Yupeng. Aside from making it to the final, Cao also made the tournament's highest break, his first professional maximum in the third frame of his first round match against Andrew Higginson.

== Prize fund ==
The breakdown of prize money for this year is shown below:

- Winner: £70,000
- Runner-up: £30,000
- Semi-final: £20,000
- Quarter-final: £10,000
- Last 16: £6,000
- Last 32: £3,500
- Last 64: £2,500
- Highest break: £2,000
- Total: £366,000

The "rolling 147 prize" for a maximum break stood at £20,000

== Main draw ==
=== Qualifying round ===
(Scotland) Ross Vallance 4–2 (Scotland) Robert Carlisle

=== Top half ===
==== Section 1 ====
Last 128; Best of 7 frames
(Hong Kong) Marco Fu (1)	4
(Wales) Duane Jones	0
(China) Fang Xiongman	4
(England) David Gilbert	3
(China) Zhou Yuelong	4
(Wales) Ian Preece	1
(Wales) Lee Walker	2
(China) Yu Delu	4
(England) Martin Gould (16)	3
(Thailand) Noppon Saengkham	4
(Republic of Ireland) Fergal O'Brien	1
(China) Zhang Yong	4
(China) Lyu Haotian	2
(England) Gary Wilson	4
(China) Xiao Guodong	4
(China) Li Yuan	1

Last 64; Best of 7 frames
(Hong Kong) Marco Fu (1)	4
(China) Fang Xiongman	2
(China) Zhou Yuelong	4
(China) Yu Delu	2
(Thailand) Noppon Saengkham	4
(China) Zhang Yong	0
(England) Gary Wilson	3
(China) Xiao Guodong	4

Last 32; Best of 7 frames
(Hong Kong) Marco Fu (1)	4
(China) Zhou Yuelong	3
(Thailand) Noppon Saengkham	1
(China) Xiao Guodong	4

Last 16; Best of 7 frames
(Hong Kong) Marco Fu (1)	3
(China) Xiao Guodong	4

==== Section 2 ====
Last 128; Best of 7 frames
(Scotland) Chris Totten	4
(England) Sam Baird	1
(Iran) Hossein Vafaei	3
(England) Mitchell Mann	4
(England) John Astley	2
(England) Liam Highfield	4
(Australia) Neil Robertson (9)	4
(England) Rod Lawler	0
(England) David Grace	4
(Switzerland) Alexander Ursenbacher	1
(England) Matthew Selt	2
(Scotland) Alan McManus	4
(England) Mark King	1
(China) Zhang Anda	4
(Northern Ireland) Mark Allen (8)	3
(England) Ben Woollaston	4

Last 64; Best of 7 frames
(Scotland) Chris Totten	4
(England) Mitchell Mann	3
(England) Liam Highfield	2
(Australia) Neil Robertson (9)	4
(England) David Grace	4
(Scotland) Alan McManus	3
(China) Zhang Anda	4
(England) Ben Woollaston	2

Last 32; Best of 7 frames
(Scotland) Chris Totten	0
(Australia) Neil Robertson (9)	4
(England) David Grace	4
(China) Zhang Anda	3

Last 16; Best of 7 frames
(Australia) Neil Robertson (9)	4
(England) David Grace	2

==== Section 3 ====
Last 128; Best of 7 frames
(Scotland) John Higgins (5)	4
(England) Jack Lisowski	1
(England) Nigel Bond	0
(England) Christopher Keogan	4
(England) Mike Dunn	4
(England) Adam Duffy	0
(China) Zhao Xintong	2
(Northern Ireland) Gerard Greene	4
(England) Ali Carter (12)	4
(England) Anthony Hamilton	0
(England) Ashley Hugill	4
(Scotland) Ross Vallance	3
(China) Tian Pengfei	2
(Australia) Kurt Dunham	4
(China) Yuan Sijun	0
(England) Peter Lines	4

Last 64; Best of 7 frames
(Scotland) John Higgins (5)	4
(England) Christopher Keogan	1
(England) Mike Dunn	3
(Northern Ireland) Gerard Greene	4
(England) Ali Carter (12)	3
(England) Ashley Hugill	4
(Australia) Kurt Dunham	2
(England) Peter Lines	4

Last 32; Best of 7 frames
(Scotland) John Higgins (5)	4
(Northern Ireland) Gerard Greene	0
(England) Ashley Hugill	4
(England) Peter Lines	1

Last 16; Best of 7 frames
(Scotland) John Higgins (5)	4
(England) Ashley Hugill	0

==== Section 4 ====
Last 128; Best of 7 frames
(Thailand) James Wattana	0
(Wales) Michael White	4
(Scotland) Scott Donaldson	4
(Republic of Ireland) Josh Boileau	2
(Wales) Dominic Dale	4
(Egypt) Basem Eltahhan	1
(England) Kyren Wilson (13)	4
(China) Chen Zhe	2
(Thailand) Thepchaiya Un-Nooh	3
(England) Jamie Curtis-Barrett	4
(England) Sean O'Sullivan	1
(China) Li Hang	4
(England) Robert Milkins	4
(England) Oliver Lines	2
(England) Ronnie O'Sullivan (4)	4
(Cyprus) Michael Georgiou	1

Last 64; Best of 7 frames
(Wales) Michael White	4
(Scotland) Scott Donaldson	2
(Wales) Dominic Dale	1
(England) Kyren Wilson (13)	4
(England) Jamie Curtis-Barrett	1
(China) Li Hang	4
(England) Robert Milkins	1
(England) Ronnie O'Sullivan (4)	4

Last 32; Best of 7 frames
(Wales) Michael White	4
(England) Kyren Wilson (13)	1
(China) Li Hang	3
(England) Ronnie O'Sullivan (4)	4

Last 16; Best of 7 frames
(Wales) Michael White	1
(England) Ronnie O'Sullivan (4)	4

=== Bottom half ===
==== Section 5 ====
Last 128; Best of 7 frames
(China) Ding Junhui (3)	4
(Wales) Jak Jones	2
(England) Chris Wakelin	4
(Malaysia) Thor Chuan Leong	2
(England) Rory McLeod	4
(Scotland) Graeme Dott	2
(China) Niu Zhuang	4
(China) Wang Yuchen	3
(China) Liang Wenbo (14)	4
(England) Sanderson Lam	2
(England) Mark Joyce	4
(England) Martin O'Donnell	2
(England) Ricky Walden	4
(England) Billy Joe Castle	2
(Germany) Lukas Kleckers	0
(Northern Ireland) Joe Swail	4

Last 64; Best of 7 frames
(China) Ding Junhui (3)	4
(England) Chris Wakelin	2
(England) Rory McLeod	4
(China) Niu Zhuang	0
(China) Liang Wenbo (14)	3
(England) Mark Joyce	4
(England) Ricky Walden	4
(Northern Ireland) Joe Swail	2

Last 32; Best of 7 frames
(China) Ding Junhui (3)	3
(England) Rory McLeod	4
(England) Mark Joyce	1
(England) Ricky Walden	4

Last 16; Best of 7 frames
(England) Rory McLeod	3
(England) Ricky Walden	4

==== Section 6 ====
Last 128; Best of 7 frames
(England) Ian Burns	1
(England) Tom Ford	4
(Wales) Matthew Stevens	1
(England) Hammad Miah	4
(England) Joe Perry	4
(China) Chen Zifan	2
(Wales) Jackson Page	1
(England) Stuart Carrington	4
(England) Allan Taylor	4
(Iran) Soheil Vahedi	3
(China) Cao Yupeng	4
(England) Andrew Higginson	0
(England) Jimmy White	4
(Thailand) Sunny Akani	1
(England) Shaun Murphy (6)	3
(Wales) Daniel Wells	4

Last 64; Best of 7 frames
(England) Tom Ford	4
(England) Hammad Miah	0
(England) Joe Perry	2
(England) Stuart Carrington	4
(England) Allan Taylor	3
(China) Cao Yupeng	4
(England) Jimmy White	1
(Wales) Daniel Wells	4

Last 32; Best of 7 frames
(England) Tom Ford	4
(England) Stuart Carrington	0
(China) Cao Yupeng	4
(Wales) Daniel Wells	3

Last 16; Best of 7 frames
(England) Tom Ford	0
(China) Cao Yupeng	4

==== Section 7 ====
Last 128; Best of 7 frames
(England) Barry Hawkins (7)	2
(Wales) Jamie Jones	4
(Australia) Matthew Bolton	0
(China) Yan Bingtao	4
(Republic of Ireland) Leo Fernandez	1
(Pakistan) Hamza Akbar	4
(Malta) Alex Borg	0
(Scotland) Stephen Maguire	4
(Wales) Mark Williams (10)	w/d
(China) Xu Si	w/o
(England) Paul Davison	3
(England) Jimmy Robertson	4
(Republic of Ireland) Ken Doherty	1
(England) Craig Steadman	4
(England) Alfie Burden	4
(Scotland) Ross Muir	2

Last 64; Best of 7 frames
(Wales) Jamie Jones	0
(China) Yan Bingtao	4
(Pakistan) Hamza Akbar	2
(Scotland) Stephen Maguire	4
(China) Xu Si	4
(England) Jimmy Robertson	2
(England) Craig Steadman	4
(England) Alfie Burden	2

Last 32; Best of 7 frames
(China) Yan Bingtao	3
(Scotland) Stephen Maguire	4
(China) Xu Si	4
(England) Craig Steadman	2

Last 16; Best of 7 frames
(Scotland) Stephen Maguire	4
(China) Xu Si	1

==== Section 8 ====
Last 128; Best of 7 frames
(China) Mei Xiwen	4
(Norway) Kurt Maflin	0
(Scotland) Rhys Clark	2
(England) Elliot Slessor	4
(India) Aditya Mehta	2
(England) Peter Ebdon	4
(Scotland) Anthony McGill (15)	4
(Wales) Ryan Day	0
(Scotland) Eden Sharav	4
(England) Mark Davis	3
(England) Robbie Williams	0
(England) Michael Holt	4
(England) Sam Craigie	4
(Thailand) Boonyarit Keattikun	2
(England) Judd Trump (2)	4
(Finland) Robin Hull	0

Last 64; Best of 7 frames
(China) Mei Xiwen	1
(England) Elliot Slessor	4
(England) Peter Ebdon	4
(Scotland) Anthony McGill (15)	1
(Scotland) Eden Sharav	3
(England) Michael Holt	4
(England) Sam Craigie	2
(England) Judd Trump (2)	4

Last 32; Best of 7 frames
(England) Elliot Slessor	4
(England) Peter Ebdon	3
(England) Michael Holt	0
(England) Judd Trump (2)	4

Last 16; Best of 7 frames
(England) Elliot Slessor	3
(England) Judd Trump (2)	4

=== Finals ===
Quarter-finals; Best of 9 frames
(China) Xiao Guodong	4
(Australia) Neil Robertson (9)	5
(Scotland) John Higgins (5)	5
(England) Ronnie O'Sullivan (4)	0
(England) Ricky Walden	3
(China) Cao Yupeng	5
(Scotland) Stephen Maguire	2
(England) Judd Trump	5

Semi-finals; Best of 11 frames
(Australia) Neil Robertson (9)	6
(Scotland) John Higgins (5)	3
(China) Cao Yupeng	6
(England) Judd Trump	4

Final; Best of 17 frames
(Australia) Neil Robertson (9)	9
(China) Cao Yupeng	8

=== Final ===
Final: Best of 17 frames. Referee: Leo Scullion. Emirates Arena, Glasgow, Scotland, 17 December 2017.
Neil Robertson (9); Australia	9–8	Cao Yupeng; China
Afternoon: 21–118 (82), 72–62 (Robertson 61, Cao 62), 0–96 (72), 29–75 (74), 68–34, 7–119 (53, 66), 37–72 (67), 115–18 (64, 50); Evening: 31–79 (72), 132–0 (132), 6–81 (81), 0–108 (66), 85–6 (85), 62–14, 73–30, 60–54, 77–16 (59)
132	Highest break	82
1	Century breaks	0
6	50+ breaks	10

== Century breaks ==
A total of 73 century breaks were made during the competition.

- 147 – Cao Yupeng
- 144, 138, 117, 113, 109, 108, 105 – John Higgins
- 144, 122, 114 – Noppon Saengkham
- 143, 138, 135, 132, 128, 124, 118, 117, 114, 113, 102 – Neil Robertson
- 140, 129, 102 – Judd Trump
- 136, 112, 103, 101 – Ronnie O'Sullivan
- 135, 122, 104 – Ding Junhui
- 130 – Liang Wenbo
- 129 – Tom Ford
- 127, 126 – Michael White
- 125, 117 – Ali Carter
- 124, 123 – David Grace
- 123, 106, 101 – Xiao Guodong
- 123 – Li Hang
- 123 – Mitchell Mann
- 122 – Chris Wakelin
- 119, 102, 101 – Yan Bingtao
- 119 – Oliver Lines
- 119 – Kyren Wilson
- 117, 107, 101 – Marco Fu
- 115 – Wang Yuchen
- 113 – Dominic Dale
- 113 – Ashley Hugill
- 112 – Joe Perry
- 110 – Ben Woollaston
- 108 – Jamie Jones
- 106 – Stuart Carrington
- 105 – Ricky Walden
- 104 – Zhou Yuelong
- 104 – Elliot Slessor
- 103 – Mark Joyce
- 103 – Xu Si
- 103 – Daniel Wells
- 103 – Gary Wilson
- 102 – Martin Gould
- 101 – Michael Holt
- 100 – Liam Highfield
- 100 – Craig Steadman
- 100 – Zhao Xintong
