= Zhang Yong (snooker player) =

Chinese snooker player (born 1995)

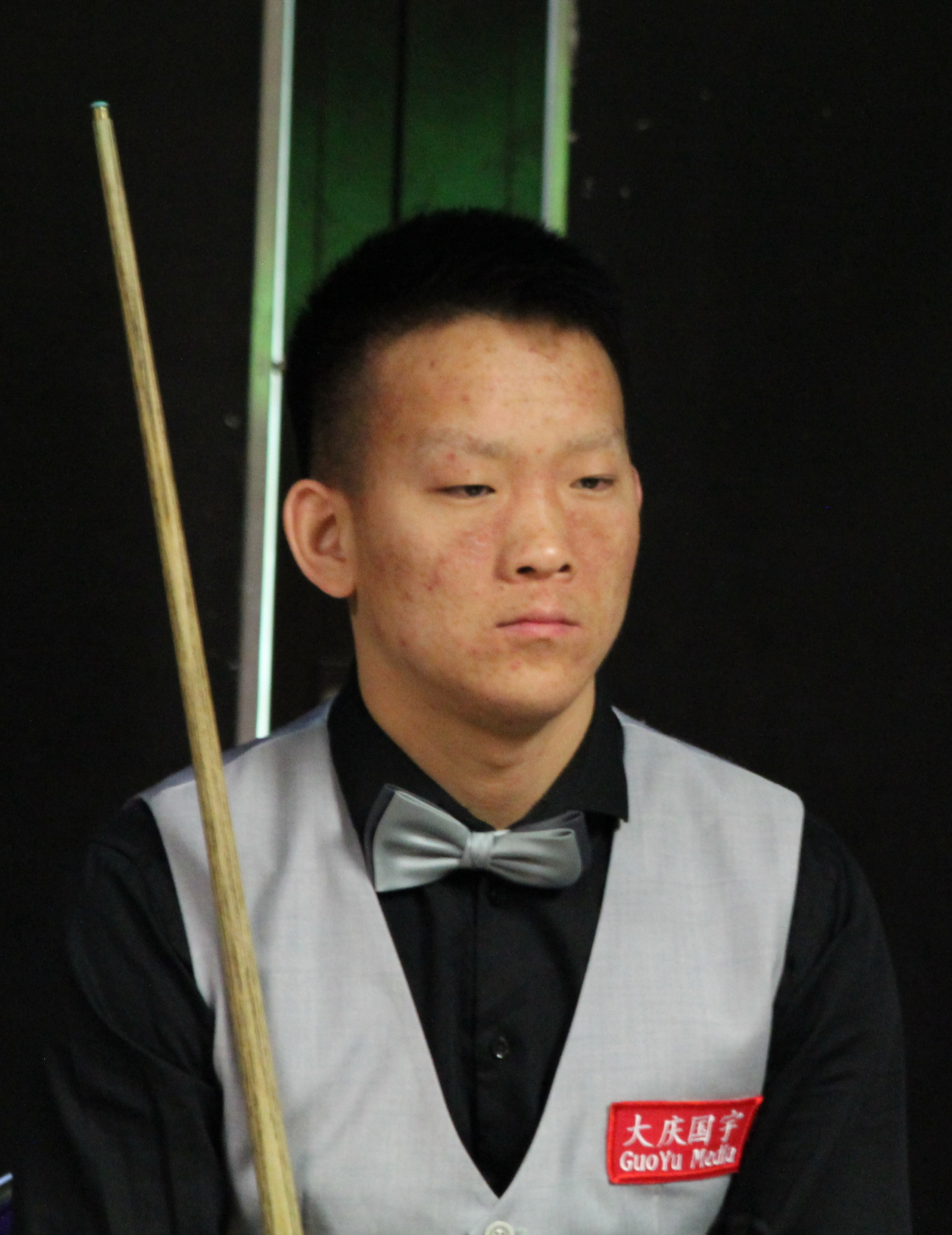
- Paul Hunter Classic 2017

Personal information
- Born: 21 July 1995 (age 31) Ningling, Henan, China

Sport
- Country: China
- Sport: Snooker
- Professional: 2015–2019
- Highest ranking: 70 (July–August 2018)
- Best ranking finish: Quarter-final (x2)

Zhang Yong (Chinese: 张永; pinyin: Zhāng Yǒng; born 21 July 1995) is a Chinese former professional snooker player.

== Career ==
Prior to turning professional Zhang featured in Asian Players Tour Championship events from 2012 to 2015, as well as being a semi-finalist in the 2015 ACBS Asian Snooker Championship. He made losing wildcard appearances at the 2014 Shanghai Masters and 2015 China Open.

Zhang earned a two-year professional World Snooker Tour card for the 2015–16 and 2016–17 seasons after his performances in the 2014/2015 Asian Tour events, with the highlight being a quarter-final appearance in the 2015 Xuzhou Open where he beat professionals Jimmy Robertson and Dechawat Poomjaeng, seeing him finish 25th on the Order of Merit.

Zhang won three matches in the early part of the 2015/2016 season, but then lost seven in a row until he beat Joe Swail 10–7 in the first round of World Championship qualifying, before losing 10–3 to Matthew Stevens. He qualified for the 2016 Indian Open, World Open and Riga Masters but was knocked out in the first round of all of them. Later in the 2016–17 season he qualified for the German Masters by beating Mike Dunn 5–4 and Mark Davis 5–3 and he was beaten 5–3 by Stuart Bingham in the opening round. After losing in the opening round of the 2017 World Championship qualifiers to compatriot Tian Pengfei, Zhang lost his place on the tour at the end of the season due to being ranked outside of the top 64 in the world rankings. He then entered Q School to try to regain his tour card and, after winning eight matches over the two events, he emerged as the highest placed qualifier via the Q School Order of Merit list, thus earning a new two-year professional tour card for the 2017/18 and 2018/19 seasons.

== Performance and rankings timeline ==
Tournament	2012/ 13	2013/ 14	2014/ 15	2015/ 16	2016/ 17	2017/ 18	2018/ 19	2019/ 20
Ranking (Note: It shows the ranking at the beginning of the season.)	(Note: He was an amateur.)			(Note: New players on the Main Tour don't have a ranking.)	98	(Note: Players qualified through Q School started the season without prize money ranking points.)	70	
Ranking tournaments
Riga Masters	Not Held		MR		1R	LQ	3R	A
International Championship	A	A	A	LQ	LQ	2R	LQ	A
China Championship	Tournament Not Held				NR	WD	LQ	A
English Open	Tournament Not Held				1R	3R	2R	A
World Open	A	A	A	A	1R	LQ	LQ	A
Northern Ireland Open	Tournament Not Held				1R	2R	1R	A
UK Championship	A	A	A	1R	1R	1R	1R	A
Scottish Open	MR	Not Held			1R	2R	3R	A
European Masters	Tournament Not Held				LQ	1R	1R	A
German Masters	A	A	A	LQ	1R	LQ	LQ	A
World Grand Prix	Not Held		NR	DNQ	DNQ	DNQ	DNQ	DNQ
Welsh Open	A	A	A	1R	1R	1R	1R	A
Shoot-Out	Non-Ranking Event				3R	QF	1R	A
Players Championship (Note: The event was called the Players Tour Championship Grand Finals (2012/2013))	DNQ	DNQ	DNQ	DNQ	DNQ	DNQ	DNQ	DNQ
Gibraltar Open	Not Held			MR	2R	QF	1R	A
Tour Championship	Tournament Not Held						DNQ	DNQ
World Championship	A	A	A	LQ	LQ	LQ	LQ	A
Non-ranking tournaments
Haining Open	Not Held		MR		3R	4R	A	3R
Former ranking tournaments
Australian Goldfields Open	A	A	A	LQ	Tournament Not Held			
Shanghai Masters	A	A	WR	LQ	LQ	LQ	Ranking	
Paul Hunter Classic	Minor-Ranking Event				1R	1R	3R	NR
Indian Open	NH	A	A	NH	1R	LQ	1R	NH
China Open	A	A	WR	LQ	LQ	LQ	LQ	NH
Former non-ranking tournaments
Shoot-Out	A	A	A	A	Ranking Event			

Performance Table Legend
LQ	lost in the qualifying draw	#R	lost in the early rounds of the tournament (WR = Wildcard round, RR = Round robin)	QF	lost in the quarter-finals
SF	lost in the semi-finals	F	lost in the final	W	won the tournament
DNQ	did not qualify for the tournament	A	did not participate in the tournament	WD	withdrew from the tournament

NH / Not Held	means an event was not held.
NR / Non-Ranking Event	means an event is/was no longer a ranking event.
R / Ranking Event	means an event is/was a ranking event.
MR / Minor-Ranking Event	means an event is/was a minor-ranking event.
