= 2018 Snooker Shoot Out =

2018 Coral Snooker Shoot Out
Tournament information
- Dates: 8–11 February 2018
- Venue: Watford Colosseum
- City: Watford
- Country: England
- Organisation: World Snooker Tour
- Format: Ranking event
- Total prize fund: £146,000
- Winner's share: £32,000
- Highest break: Michael Georgiou (CYP) (109)

Final
- Champion: Michael Georgiou (CYP)
- Runner-up: Graeme Dott (SCO)
- Score: 67–56 (one frame)

The 2018 Shoot Out (officially the 2018 Coral Snooker Shoot Out) was a professional ranking snooker tournament, that took place from 8–11 February 2018 in Watford, England. It was played under a variation of the standard rules of snooker, and was the fourteenth ranking event of the 2017/2018 season.

Anthony McGill was the defending champion, but he lost to Mark Davis in the first round, after Davis made a break of 102.

Michael Georgiou won his first ever ranking title, beating Graeme Dott 67–56 in the final. None of the top five players in the world rankings at the time, (Mark Selby, Ronnie O'Sullivan, Judd Trump, Ding Junhui and John Higgins) had entered the tournament.

== Tournament format ==
The tournament was played using a variation of the traditional snooker rules. The draw was randomised before each round. All matches were played over a single frame, each of which lasted up to 10 minutes. The event featured a variable shot clock; shots played in the first five minutes were allowed 15 seconds while the final five had a 10-second timer. All foul shots awarded the opponent a ball in hand. Unlike traditional snooker, if a ball did not hit a cushion on every shot, it was a foul. Rather than a coin toss, a lag was used to choose which player breaks. In the event of a draw, each player received a shot at the blue ball this is known as a "blue ball shootout". The player who potted the ball with the cue ball from inside the D and the blue ball on its spot with the opponent missing won the match.

=== Prize fund ===
The breakdown of prize money for this year is shown below:

- Winner: £32,000
- Runner-up: £16,000
- Semi-final: £8,000
- Quarter-final: £4,000
- Last 16: £2,000
- Last 32: £1,000
- Last 64: £500
- Last 128: £250 (prize money at this stage did not count towards the world rankings)
- Highest break: £2,000
- Total: £146,000
- The "rolling 147 prize" for a maximum break stood at £10,000

== Tournament draw ==
All times in Greenwich Mean Time. Times for quarter-finals, semi-finals and final are approximate. Players in bold denote match winners.
Note: w/d=withdrawn; w/o=walk-over

=== Round 1 ===
==== 8 February – 12:00 ====
- **Mark Davis** (ENG) **103**–0 Anthony McGill (SCO)
- Mark Joyce (ENG) 22–**36** **Alex Davies** (ENG)
- Alan McManus (SCO) 32–**52** **Ross Vallance** (SCO)
- **Duane Jones** (WAL) **58**–20 Ben Woollaston (ENG)
- Craig Steadman (ENG) 7–**79** **Ali Carter** (ENG)
- **Scott Donaldson** (SCO) **33**–9 Yuan Sijun (CHN)
- **Lyu Haotian** (CHN) **53**–4 Xu Si (CHN)
- **David Lilley** (ENG) **90**–22 Chen Zhe (CHN)
- **Martin Gould** (ENG) **59**–17 Ken Doherty (IRL)
- Chen Zifan (CHN) 17–**51** **Peter Lines** (ENG)
- **Liam Highfield** (ENG) **53**–47 Fang Xiongman (CHN)
- **David Gilbert** (ENG) **34**–31 Adam Duffy (ENG)
- **Matthew Selt** (ENG) **46**–11 Dominic Dale (WAL)
- **Billy Castle** (ENG) **68**–24 Chris Wakelin (ENG)
- **Elliot Slessor** (ENG) **87**–4 Sanderson Lam (ENG)
- **Barry Hawkins** (ENG) **67**–0 Shaun Murphy (ENG)
- **Kuldesh Johal** (ENG) **22**–14 Wang Yuchen (CHN)
- **Ashley Hugill** (ENG) **39**–16 Ben Jones (WAL)
- Eden Sharav (SCO) 52–**54** **Mei Xiwen** (CHN)
- Hammad Miah (ENG) 12–**53** **Joe Perry** (ENG)
- **Allan Taylor** (ENG) **90**–0 Ian Burns (ENG)
- Li Hang (CHN) 0–**44** **Mark Williams** (WAL)
- Christopher Keogan (ENG) 2–**48** **Michael Williams** (ENG)
- Ashley Carty (ENG) 34–**43** **Mark King** (ENG)

==== 8 February – 19:00 ====
- Robin Hull (FIN) w/d–**w/o** **Sunny Akani** (THA)
- James Silverwood (ENG) 0–**71** **Stuart Bingham** (ENG)
- **John Astley** (ENG) **47**–43 Ross Muir (SCO)
- **Kurt Dunham** (AUS) **65**–14 Chris Totten (SCO)
- **Noppon Saengkham** (THA) **79**–0 Paul Davison (ENG)
- **Basem Eltahhan** (EGY) **44**–17 Li Yuan (CHN)
- **James Cahill** (ENG) **77**–2 Rory McLeod (ENG)
- **Alexander Ursenbacher** (SUI) **32**–27 Jack Lisowski (ENG)
- **Jimmy White** (ENG) **70**–27 Anthony Hamilton (ENG)
- David Grace (ENG) 31–**63** **Xiao Guodong** (CHN)
- Jamie Cope (ENG) 19–**41** **Hamza Akbar** (PAK)
- **Tian Pengfei** (CHN) **35**–16 Wayne Brown (ENG)
- Sam Baird (ENG) 24–**36** **Joe Swail** (NIR)
- **James Wattana** (THA) **55**–18 Zhang Anda (CHN)
- Lee Walker (WAL) 35–**67** **Stuart Carrington** (ENG)
- **Nigel Bond** (ENG) **53**–10 Leo Fernandez (IRL)

==== 9 February – 12:00 ====
- **Robert Milkins** (ENG) **59**–31 Alfie Burden (ENG)
- **Michael Georgiou** (CYP) **73**–41 Thor Chuan Leong (MAS)
- **Alex Borg** (MLT) **54**–44 Daniel Wells (WAL)
- **Fergal O'Brien** (IRL) **51**–31 William Lemons (ENG)
- **Mike Dunn** (ENG) **22**–14 David John (WAL)
- Kyren Wilson (ENG) 37–**48** **Ricky Walden** (ENG)
- Kurt Maflin (NOR) 13–**27** **Jak Jones** (WAL)
- Niu Zhuang (CHN) 20–**49** **Sean O'Sullivan** (ENG)
- **Matthew Stevens** (WAL) **62**–41 Zhao Xintong (CHN)
- Oliver Brown (ENG) 1–**58** **Ian Preece** (WAL)
- Lewis Roberts (ENG) 37–**57** **Jamie Jones** (WAL)
- **Gerard Greene** (NIR) **54**–1 Zhou Yuelong (CHN)
- Soheil Vahedi (IRN) 22–**40** **Peter Ebdon** (ENG)
- **Zhang Yong** (CHN) **40**–26 Jamie Curtis-Barrett (ENG)
- Mitchell Mann (ENG) 0–**62** **Martin O'Donnell** (ENG)
- Yan Bingtao (CHN) 18–**33** **Graeme Dott** (SCO)
- **Josh Boileau** (IRL) **49**–14 Daniel Ward (ENG)
- Lukas Kleckers (GER) 27–**29** **Gary Wilson** (ENG)
- **Michael White** (WAL) **34**–8 Andrew Higginson (ENG)
- Oliver Lines (ENG) 33–**43** **Cao Yupeng** (CHN)
- **Tom Ford** (ENG) **65**–31 Mark Allen (NIR)
- Charlie Walters (ENG) 9–**22** **Rod Lawler** (ENG)
- Jimmy Robertson (ENG) 15–**37** **Luca Brecel** (BEL)
- **Michael Holt** (ENG) **59**–21 Ryan Day (WAL)

=== Round 2 ===
==== 9 February – 19:00 ====
- Xiao Guodong (CHN) 11–**74** **Tom Ford** (ENG)
- Liam Highfield (ENG) 43–**44** **Gerard Greene** (NIR)
- **Jamie Jones** (WAL) **44**–0 Michael White (WAL)
- James Cahill (ENG) 0–**54** **Graeme Dott** (SCO)
- Noppon Saengkham (THA) 5–**72** **Martin O'Donnell** (ENG)
- **Matthew Stevens** (WAL) **27**–26 David Lilley (ENG)
- Kuldesh Johal (ENG) 25–**53** **Mike Dunn** (ENG)
- **Sean O'Sullivan** (ENG) **37**–16 Peter Ebdon (ENG)
- Robert Milkins (ENG) 21–**31** **Hamza Akbar** (PAK)
- **Martin Gould** (ENG) **47**–41 John Astley (ENG)
- **Nigel Bond** (ENG) **31**–28 Peter Lines (ENG)
- Fergal O'Brien (IRL) 32–**33** **Ricky Walden** (ENG)
- Lyu Haotian (CHN) 21–**48** **Kurt Dunham** (AUS)
- **Michael Georgiou** (CYP) **84**–1 Jak Jones (WAL)
- **Zhang Yong** (CHN) **42**–10 Ross Vallance (SCO)
- **Barry Hawkins** (ENG) **75**–40 Alex Davies (ENG)

==== 10 February – 19:00 ====
- James Wattana (THA) 45–**55** **Mark Williams** (WAL)
- Alexander Ursenbacher (SWI) 18–**33** **Rod Lawler** (ENG)
- Michael Holt (ENG) 2–**32** **Ashley Hugill** (ENG)
- Duane Jones (WAL) 36–**61** **Allan Taylor** (ENG)
- **Ali Carter** (ENG) **63**–15 Joe Swail (NIR)
- **Stuart Carrington** (ENG) **81**–21 Ian Preece (WAL)
- **Luca Brecel** (BEL) **56**–7 Mei Xiwen (CHN)
- **Cao Yupeng** (CHN) **27**–24 Josh Boileau (IRL)
- Jimmy White (ENG) 35–**49** **Billy Castle** (ENG)
- **Sunny Akani** (THA) **95**–0 David Gilbert (ENG)
- **Elliot Slessor** (ENG) **51**–0 Michael Williams (ENG)
- Matthew Selt (ENG) 25–**37** **Alex Borg** (MLT)
- Gary Wilson (ENG) 10–**28** **Joe Perry** (ENG)
- Mark King (ENG) 47–**52** **Tian Pengfei** (CHN) (Note: Tian Pengfei beat Mark King in a sudden death blue ball shootout after the match finished level at 47–47.)
- Basem Eltahhan (EGY) 10–**69** **Mark Davis** (ENG)
- **Stuart Bingham** (ENG) **68**–41 Scott Donaldson (SCO)

=== Round 3 ===
==== 11 February – 12:00 ====
- Ali Carter (ENG) 1–**71** **Mark Davis** (ENG)
- Hamza Akbar (PAK) 16–**45** **Cao Yupeng** (CHN)
- **Stuart Carrington** (ENG) **57**–26 Billy Castle (ENG)
- Ashley Hugill (ENG) 11–**64** **Graeme Dott** (SCO)
- Tian Pengfei (CHN) 16–**26** **Joe Perry** (ENG)
- **Zhang Yong** (CHN) **71**–1 Mike Dunn (ENG)
- **Jamie Jones** (WAL) **79**–0 Rod Lawler (ENG)
- **Stuart Bingham** (ENG) **60**–0 Elliot Slessor (ENG)
- **Mark Williams** (WAL) **54**–9 Allan Taylor (ENG)
- Sean O'Sullivan (ENG) 41–**51** **Gerard Greene** (NIR)
- Alex Borg (MLT) 13–**31** **Sunny Akani** (THA)
- **Martin O'Donnell** (ENG) **24**–17 Ricky Walden (ENG)
- Kurt Dunham (AUS) 1–**84** **Barry Hawkins** (ENG)
- **Tom Ford** (ENG) **51**–29 Martin Gould (ENG)
- Luca Brecel (BEL) 0–**80** **Michael Georgiou** (CYP)
- **Nigel Bond** (ENG) **71**–9 Matthew Stevens (WAL)

=== Round 4 ===
==== 11 February – 18:00 ====
- **Sunny Akani** (THA) **47**–31 Tom Ford (ENG)
- **Martin O'Donnell** (ENG) **33**–21 Jamie Jones (WAL)
- **Zhang Yong** (CHN) **48**–24 Stuart Carrington (ENG)
- Nigel Bond (ENG) 40–**71** **Michael Georgiou** (CYP)
- Gerard Greene (NIR) 34–**69** **Cao Yupeng** (CHN)
- **Graeme Dott** (SCO) **64**–24 Barry Hawkins (ENG)
- **Joe Perry** (ENG) **61**–56 Mark Williams (WAL) (Note: Joe Perry beat Mark Williams in a sudden death blue ball shootout after the match finished level at 56–56.)
- Stuart Bingham (ENG) 6–**45** **Mark Davis** (ENG)

=== Quarter-finals ===
==== 11 February – 20:00 ====
- **Martin O'Donnell** (ENG) **48**–9 Sunny Akani (THA)
- **Graeme Dott** (SCO) **61**–35 Cao Yupeng (CHN)
- **Mark Davis** (ENG) **41**–36 Joe Perry (ENG) (Note: Mark Davis beat Joe Perry in a sudden death blue ball shootout after the match finished level at 36–36.)
- **Michael Georgiou** (CYP) **114**–9 Zhang Yong (CHN)

=== Semi-finals ===
==== 11 February – 21:15 ====
- **Michael Georgiou** (CYP) **53**–5 Martin O'Donnell (ENG)
- Mark Davis (ENG) 8–**59** **Graeme Dott** (SCO)

=== Final ===
Final: 1 frame. Referee: Desislava Bozhilova; Watford Colosseum, Watford, England, 11 February 2018 – 21:45
| **Michael Georgiou**; Cyprus | **67**–56 | Graeme Dott; Scotland |

== Century breaks ==
Total: 2

- 109 – Michael Georgiou
- 102 – Mark Davis
