= 2015 ACBS Asian Snooker Championship =

ACBS Asian Snooker Championship
Tournament information
- Dates: 23–30 April 2015
- City: Kuala Lumpur
- Country: Malaysia
- Organisation: ACBS
- Winner's share: $7,000

Final
- Champion: (Pakistan) Hamza Akbar
- Runner-up: (India) Pankaj Advani
- Score: 7–6

The 2015 ACBS Asian Snooker Championship was an amateur snooker tournament that took place from 23 April to 30 April 2015 in Kuala Lumpur, Malaysia It was the 31st edition of the ACBS Asian Snooker Championship and also doubles as a qualification event for the World Snooker Tour.

The 23rd seed Hamza Akbar won the event by defeating former world number 56 Pankaj Advani 7–6 in the final. This was Akbar's first Asian Snooker Championship victory and as a result Akbar was given a two-year card on the professional World Snooker Tour for the 2015/2016 and 2016/2017 seasons.

== Results ==
Last 32; Best of 7 frames
16	(China) Zhang Yong	4
17	(Iran) Soheil Vahedi	2
8	(Hong Kong) Au Chi-wai	4
25	(Thailand) Kaetikuni Boonyarit	3
9	(Malaysia) Lim Kok Leong	4
24	(Bahrain) Subah Habib	3
13	(Thailand) Kritsanut Lertsattayathorn	4
20	(Iran) Amir Sarkhosh	1
5	(China) Zhao Xintong	3
28	(Indonesia) Gebby Adi Wibawa Putra	4
12	(Singapore) Boon Chin Ang	3
21	(India) Kamal Chawla	4
15	(Pakistan) Shahram Changezi	4
18	(India) Manan Chandra	3
7	(United Arab Emirates) Khalid Alkamali	4
26	(Hong Kong) Tang Ho Alan Lin	3
10	(Pakistan) Muhammed Asif	3
23	(Pakistan) Hamza Akbar	4
14	(Malaysia) Hwa Meng Lee	2
19	(Singapore) Lim Chun Kiat	4
6	(Iran) Ehsan Heydarinezhad	4
27	(Saudi Arabia) Omar Alajlani	1
11	(Iran) Abdolmohammadi Afshin	2
22	(India) Varun Madan	4

Last 16; Best of 7 frames
1	(Hong Kong) Chau Hon Man	2
16	(China) Zhang Yong	4
8	(Hong Kong) Au Chi-wai	3
9	(Malaysia) Lim Kok Leong	4
4	(India) Pankaj Advani	4
9	(Malaysia) Lim Kok Leong	3
28	(Indonesia) Gebby Adi Wibawa Putra	1
21	(India) Kamal Chawla	4
2	(Malaysia) Moh Keen Ho	0
15	(Pakistan) Shahram Changezi	4
7	(United Arab Emirates) Khalid Alkamali	3
23	(Pakistan) Hamza Akbar	4
3	(Malaysia) Reza Mohammed	4
29	(Singapore) Lim Chun Kiat	2
6	(Iran) Ehsan Heydarinezhad	0
22	(India) Varun Madan	4

Quarter-Finals; Best of 9 frames
15	(China) Zhang Yong	5
9	(Malaysia) Lim Kok Leong	0
4	(India) Pankaj Advani	5
21	(India) Kamal Chawla	2
15	(Pakistan) Shahram Changezi	1
23	(Pakistan) Hamza Akbar	5
3	(Malaysia) Reza Mohammed	5
22	(India) Varun Madan	1

Semi-Finals; Best of 11 frames
16	(China) Zhang Yong	0
4	(India) Pankaj Advani	6
23	(Pakistan) Hamza Akbar	6
3	(Malaysia) Reza Mohammed	2

Final; Best of 13 frames
4	(India) Pankaj Advani	6
23	(Pakistan) Hamza Akbar	7
