= 2018 Gibraltar Open =

2018 ManBetX Gibraltar Open
Tournament information
- Dates: 7–11 March 2018
- Venue: Tercentenary Sports Hall
- City: Gibraltar
- Organisation: World Snooker
- Format: Ranking event
- Total prize fund: £153,000
- Winner's share: £25,000
- Highest break: Stuart Bingham (ENG); Scott Donaldson (SCO); Anthony McGill (SCO) (140)

Final
- Champion: Ryan Day (WAL)
- Runner-up: Cao Yupeng (CHN)
- Score: 4–0

The 2018 Gibraltar Open (officially the 2018 ManBetX Gibraltar Open) was a professional ranking snooker tournament that took place from 7 to 11 March 2018 at the Tercentenary Sports Hall in Gibraltar. It was the seventeenth ranking event of the 2017/2018 season.

Shaun Murphy was the defending champion, but due to back and neck problems he withdrew prior to the tournament.

Ryan Day captured his second career ranking title, both won in the 2017/2018 season. He did so with a 4–0 win in the final against Cao Yupeng.

== Prize fund ==
The breakdown of prize money for this year is shown below:

- Winner: £25,000
- Runner-up: £12,000
- Semi-final: £6,000
- Quarter-final: £4,000
- Last 16: £3,000
- Last 32: £2,000
- Last 64: £1,000
- Total: £153,000

The "rolling 147 prize" for a maximum break stood at £25,000

== Main draw ==
=== Top half ===
==== Section 1 ====
Last 128; Best of 7 frames
(England) Andrew Higginson	0
(England) Stuart Bingham	4
(England) Mark King	4
(England) Nigel Bond	1
(Thailand) Noppon Saengkham	4
(England) Barry Pinches	1
(Scotland) Eden Sharav	1
(England) James Cahill	4
(Republic of Ireland) Ken Doherty	4
(Austria) Andreas Ploner	2
(Scotland) Stephen Maguire	w/d
(Norway) Kurt Maflin	w/o
(China) Li Yuan	1
(England) Tom Ford	4
(Wales) Dominic Dale	4
(Scotland) Chris Totten	1

Last 64; Best of 7 frames
(England) Stuart Bingham	4
(England) Mark King	2
(Thailand) Noppon Saengkham	4
(England) James Cahill	1
(Republic of Ireland) Ken Doherty	4
(Norway) Kurt Maflin	0
(England) Tom Ford	2
(Wales) Dominic Dale	4

Last 32; Best of 7 frames
(England) Stuart Bingham	4
(Thailand) Noppon Saengkham	2
(Republic of Ireland) Ken Doherty	4
(Wales) Dominic Dale	3

Last 16; Best of 7 frames
(England) Stuart Bingham	4
(Republic of Ireland) Ken Doherty	1

==== Section 2 ====
Last 128; Best of 7 frames
(China) Yu Delu	4
(England) Louis Heathcote	1
(China) Ding Junhui	w/d
(Malaysia) Thor Chuan Leong	w/o
(England) Shaun Murphy	w/d
(England) Jamie Cope	w/o
(Wales) Ian Preece	3
(England) Rory McLeod	4
(Wales) Matthew Stevens	4
(England) Mike Dunn	3
(China) Yuan Sijun	3
(China) Cao Yupeng	4
(England) Sam Craigie	4
(England) Joe O'Connor	2
(England) Chris Wakelin	0
(England) Barry Hawkins	4

Last 64; Best of 7 frames
(China) Yu Delu	4
(Malaysia) Thor Chuan Leong	1
(England) Jamie Cope	4
(England) Rory McLeod	2
(Wales) Matthew Stevens	2
(China) Cao Yupeng	4
(England) Sam Craigie	4
(England) Barry Hawkins	1

Last 32; Best of 7 frames
(China) Yu Delu	4
(England) Jamie Cope	2
(China) Cao Yupeng	4
(England) Sam Craigie	2

Last 16; Best of 7 frames
(China) Yu Delu	1
(China) Cao Yupeng	4

==== Section 3 ====
Last 128; Best of 7 frames
(England) Allan Taylor	4
(England) Andy Symons	2
(China) Niu Zhuang	4
(England) Mike Finn	2
(Pakistan) Hamza Akbar	2
(Wales) Jak Jones	4
(Northern Ireland) Gerard Greene	3
(Wales) Lee Walker	4
(England) Paul Davison	3
(Scotland) Anthony McGill	4
(England) David Grace	4
(England) Ben Woollaston	1
(China) Li Hang	4
(England) Matthew Glasby	1
(England) Oliver Lines	4
(England) Elliot Slessor	2

Last 64; Best of 7 frames
(England) Allan Taylor	4
(China) Niu Zhuang	3
(Wales) Jak Jones	0
(Wales) Lee Walker	4
(Scotland) Anthony McGill	4
(England) David Grace	2
(China) Li Hang	0
(England) Oliver Lines	4

Last 32; Best of 7 frames
(England) Allan Taylor	1
(Wales) Lee Walker	4
(Scotland) Anthony McGill	4
(England) Oliver Lines	0

Last 16; Best of 7 frames
(Wales) Lee Walker	4
(Scotland) Anthony McGill	2

==== Section 4 ====
Last 128; Best of 7 frames
(Wales) Jamie Jones	3
(England) Robbie Williams	4
(China) Liang Wenbo	4
(Malta) Alex Borg	1
(England) Mitchell Mann	4
(England) Patrick Whelan	3
(England) Matthew Selt	w/o
(Wales) Darren Morgan	w/d
(England) John Astley	4
(England) Jimmy Robertson	0
(England) Robert Milkins	2
(England) Andy Hicks	4
(England) Kyren Wilson	4
(England) Mark Joyce	1
(Wales) Daniel Wells	4
(England) Ian Burns	2

Last 64; Best of 7 frames
(England) Robbie Williams	0
(China) Liang Wenbo	4
(England) Mitchell Mann	2
(England) Matthew Selt	4
(England) John Astley	2
(England) Andy Hicks	4
(England) Kyren Wilson	4
(Wales) Daniel Wells	1

Last 32; Best of 7 frames
(China) Liang Wenbo	1
(England) Matthew Selt	4
(England) Andy Hicks	2
(England) Kyren Wilson	4

Last 16; Best of 7 frames
(England) Matthew Selt	0
(England) Kyren Wilson	4

=== Bottom half ===
==== Section 5 ====
Last 128; Best of 7 frames
(England) Rod Lawler	3
(England) Matthew Day	4
(England) Alfie Burden	4
(England) Ricky Walden	2
(Thailand) Thepchaiya Un-Nooh	w/d
(China) Mei Xiwen	w/o
(Cyprus) Michael Georgiou	4
(England) Liam Highfield	1
(England) Sam Baird	3
(Wales) Jamie Clarke	4
(England) Jamie Curtis-Barrett	4
(Republic of Ireland) Leo Fernandez	3
(Scotland) Scott Donaldson	4
(Wales) Duane Jones	1
(Northern Ireland) Joe Swail	w/d
(Germany) Simon Lichtenberg	w/o

Last 64; Best of 7 frames
(England) Matthew Day	0
(England) Alfie Burden	4
(China) Mei Xiwen	2
(Cyprus) Michael Georgiou	4
(Wales) Jamie Clarke	4
(England) Jamie Curtis-Barrett	0
(Scotland) Scott Donaldson	4
(Germany) Simon Lichtenberg	1

Last 32; Best of 7 frames
(England) Alfie Burden	4
(Cyprus) Michael Georgiou	1
(Wales) Jamie Clarke	0
(Scotland) Scott Donaldson	4

Last 16; Best of 7 frames
(England) Alfie Burden	3
(Scotland) Scott Donaldson	4

==== Section 6 ====
Last 128; Best of 7 frames
(France) Brian Ochoiski	2
(India) Aditya Mehta	4
(England) Ali Carter	w/d
(Australia) Kurt Dunham	w/o
(China) Chen Zhe	1
(China) Tian Pengfei	4
(England) Gary Wilson	4
(Germany) Umut Dikme	0
(China) Zhang Yong	4
(England) Billy Joe Castle	1
(England) Sean O'Sullivan	w/o
(China) Yan Bingtao	w/d
(England) Peter Ebdon	3
(England) Craig Steadman	4
(England) Sanderson Lam	2
(China) Zhao Xintong	4

Last 64; Best of 7 frames
(India) Aditya Mehta	4
(Australia) Kurt Dunham	1
(China) Tian Pengfei	4
(England) Gary Wilson	1
(China) Zhang Yong	4
(England) Sean O'Sullivan	2
(England) Craig Steadman	1
(China) Zhao Xintong	4

Last 32; Best of 7 frames
(India) Aditya Mehta	2
(China) Tian Pengfei	4
(China) Zhang Yong	4
(China) Zhao Xintong	1

Last 16; Best of 7 frames
(China) Tian Pengfei	1
(China) Zhang Yong	4

==== Section 7 ====
Last 128; Best of 7 frames
(Iran) Soheil Vahedi	4
(Wales) Jackson Page	2
(China) Zhou Yuelong	2
(China) Zhang Anda	4
(England) Peter Lines	3
(England) Jamie O'Neill	4
(Scotland) Ross Muir	0
(England) Jack Lisowski	4
(England) Mark Davis	2
(England) Stuart Carrington	4
(Republic of Ireland) Fergal O'Brien	1
(England) Michael Wild	4
(England) Ashley Hugill	2
(England) Anthony Hamilton	4
(England) Adam Duffy	1
(England) Joe Perry	4

Last 64; Best of 7 frames
(Iran) Soheil Vahedi	4
(China) Zhang Anda	2
(England) Jamie O'Neill	3
(England) Jack Lisowski	4
(England) Stuart Carrington	2
(England) Michael Wild	4
(England) Anthony Hamilton	1
(England) Joe Perry	4

Last 32; Best of 7 frames
(Iran) Soheil Vahedi	3
(England) Jack Lisowski	4
(England) Michael Wild	1
(England) Joe Perry	4

Last 16; Best of 7 frames
(England) Jack Lisowski	1
(England) Joe Perry	4

==== Section 8 ====
Last 128; Best of 7 frames
(China) Xu Si	2
(Wales) Ryan Day	4
(Wales) Michael White	1
(England) Oliver Brown	4
(Belgium) Luca Brecel	1
(England) Martin O'Donnell	4
(England) Jimmy White	4
(England) Christopher Keogan	3
(England) Michael Holt	w/d
(England) Brandon Sargeant	w/o
(Republic of Ireland) Josh Boileau	w/d
(England) Thomas Kevern	w/o
(England) Hammad Miah	4
(China) Chen Zifan	0
(Germany) Lukas Kleckers	2
(China) Fang Xiongman	4

Last 64; Best of 7 frames
(Wales) Ryan Day	4
(England) Oliver Brown	1
(England) Martin O'Donnell	4
(England) Jimmy White	2
(England) Brandon Sargeant	4
(England) Thomas Kevern	3
(England) Hammad Miah	2
(China) Fang Xiongman	4

Last 32; Best of 7 frames
(Wales) Ryan Day	4
(England) Martin O'Donnell	1
(England) Brandon Sargeant	3
(China) Fang Xiongman	4

Last 16; Best of 7 frames
(Wales) Ryan Day	4
(China) Fang Xiongman	1

=== Finals ===
Quarter-finals; Best of 7 frames
(England) Stuart Bingham	0
(China) Cao Yupeng	4
(Wales) Lee Walker	4
(England) Kyren Wilson	0
(Scotland) Scott Donaldson	4
(China) Zhang Yong	2
(England) Joe Perry	1
(Wales) Ryan Day	4

Semi-finals; Best of 7 frames
(China) Cao Yupeng	4
(Wales) Lee Walker	2
(Scotland) Scott Donaldson	3
(Wales) Ryan Day	4

Final; Best of 7 frames
(China) Cao Yupeng	0
(Wales) Ryan Day	4

== Final ==
Final: Best of 7 frames. Referee: Desislava Bozhilova. Tercentenary Sports Hall, Gibraltar, 11 March 2018.
Cao Yupeng; China	0–4	Ryan Day; Wales
0–88, 7–86, 0–100 (100), 17–80
8	Highest break	100
0	Century breaks	1

== Amateur pre-qualifying ==
These matches were played in Gibraltar on 7–8 March 2018. All matches were best of 7 frames.

=== Round 1 ===
(Romania) Mihai Vladu	4–2	(Scotland) Aaron Graham
(England) Louis Heathcote	4–0	(England) Paul McLeod
(Germany) Daniel Schneider	1–4	(England) Richard Beckham
(Northern Ireland) Conor McCormack	1–4	(England) Paul Gibbs
(England) Martin Pitcher	4–2	(England) Danny Connolly
(Germany) Felix Frede	4–0	(England) Andrew Urbaniak

(England) Joshua Thomond	1–4	(England) Patrick Whelan
(Scotland) Dylan Craig	4–1	(England) Peter Devlin
(Wales) Jackson Page	4–0	(England) Andrew Mincher
(England) Dan Barsley	2–4	(Malta) Brian Cini
(England) Michael Wild	4–2	(England) Sean McAllister
(Ukraine) Iulian Boiko	2–4	(England) Brandon Sargeant

=== Round 2 ===
(Wales) Ben Jones	1–4	(England) Ryan Causton
(England) Steven Hallworth	2–4	(England) Barry Pinches
(England) Manasawin Phetmalaikul	4–2	(Romania) Mihai Vladu
(England) James Cahill	4–1	(England) Hamim Hussain
(England) Charlie Walters	4–1	(Republic of Ireland) Kevin Kelly
(Austria) Andreas Ploner	4–3	(England) Ashley Carty
(Wales) Bradley Tyson	0–4	(England) Louis Heathcote
(England) Matthew Hudson	3–4	(Gibraltar) Liam Golt
(England) Ian Martin	3–4	(England) Richard Beckham
(England) Jamie Cope	4–1	(England) Lee Prickman
(England) Joe O'Connor	4–0	(Republic of Ireland) Daniel O'Regan
(England) Adam Edge	4–0	(Netherlands) Manon Melief
(England) Andrew Milliard	4–0	(England) Paul Gibbs
(England) Andy Symons	4–0	(Republic of Ireland) Tony Corrigan
(Ukraine) Sergiy Isayenko	2–4	(England) Harvey Chandler
(England) Jenson Kendrick	3–4	(England) Mike Finn
(England) Reggie Edwards	3–4	(England) Martin Pitcher
(Republic of Ireland) Fergal Quinn	0–4	(England) Matthew Glasby
(England) Shahidul Islam	1–4	(Germany) Felix Frede
(Germany) Robin Otto	0–4	(England) Patrick Whelan
(England) Andy Hicks	4–3	(England) Zack Richardson

(England) George Pragnall	4–3	(England) Mitchell Grinstead
(England) John Foster	4–0	(England) Bhavesh Sodha
(England) Matthew Day	4–3	(England) Joshua Cooper
(Wales) Jack Bradford	3–4	(England) Adam Ashley
(Wales) Jamie Clarke	4–2	(England) Michael Williams
(Germany) Simon Lichtenberg	4–3	(England) Rob James
(England) Barry Mincher	0–4	(Scotland) Dylan Craig
(India) Mohammed M.Shariff	w/d–w/o	(Bulgaria) Ivelin Boyanov Bozhanov
(Wales) Thomas Lancastle	3–4	(Germany) Umut Dikme
(Wales) Daniel Williams	w/d–w/o	(Wales) Jackson Page
(Gibraltar) Francis Becerra	1–4	(Malta) Brian Cini
(Wales) Dylan Emery	4–2	(England) Phil O'Kane
(England) Jamie O'Neill	4–0	(Gibraltar) Andrew Olivero
(Romania) Andrei Orzan	4–2	(England) Adam Nash
(Netherlands) Kevin Chan	0–4	(England) Michael Wild
(Wales) Matthew Roberts	2–4	(England) James Height
(England) Oliver Brown	4–0	(Gibraltar) Blythe Reeve
(Scotland) Lee Mein	0–4	(England) Saqib Nasir
(England) Ron Kantor	0–4	(England) Brandon Sargeant
(England) Thomas Kevern	4–2	(Gibraltar) Gareth Lopez
(England) Bash Maqsood	4–0	(England) Simon Dent

=== Round 3 ===
(England) Ryan Causton	2–4	(England) Barry Pinches
(England) Manasawin Phetmalaikul	1–4	(England) James Cahill
(England) Charlie Walters	3–4	(Austria) Andreas Ploner
(England) Louis Heathcote	4–0	(Gibraltar) Liam Golt
(England) Richard Beckham	2–4	(England) Jamie Cope
(England) Joe O'Connor	4–2	(England) Adam Edge
(England) Andrew Milliard	3–4	(England) Andy Symons
(England) Harvey Chandler	3–4	(England) Mike Finn
(England) Martin Pitcher	2–4	(England) Matthew Glasby
(Germany) Felix Frede	0–4	(England) Patrick Whelan
(England) Andy Hicks	4–2	(England) George Pragnall

(England) John Foster	1–4	(England) Matthew Day
(England) Adam Ashley	1–4	(Wales) Jamie Clarke
(Germany) Simon Lichtenberg	4–2	(Scotland) Dylan Craig
(Bulgaria) Ivelin Boyanov Bozhanov	1–4	(Germany) Umut Dikme
(Wales) Jackson Page	4–2	(Malta) Brian Cini
(Wales) Dylan Emery	2–4	(England) Jamie O'Neill
(Romania) Andrei Orzan	0–4	(England) Michael Wild
(England) James Height	0–4	(England) Oliver Brown
(England) Saqib Nasir	0–4	(England) Brandon Sargeant
(England) Thomas Kevern	4–2	(England) Bash Maqsood

== Century breaks ==
=== Main rounds centuries ===
Total: 35

- 140, 130 – Stuart Bingham
- 140 – Scott Donaldson
- 140 – Anthony McGill
- 135, 107 – Kyren Wilson
- 134 – Martin O'Donnell
- 130 – Li Hang
- 130 – Jack Lisowski
- 128 – Jackson Page
- 123 – Cao Yupeng
- 123 – Mike Finn
- 122, 113, 105 – Joe Perry
- 121 – Jamie O'Neill
- 118 – Dominic Dale
- 115, 100 – Liang Wenbo
- 112, 104 – Jamie Cope
- 112 – Hammad Miah
- 112 – Gary Wilson
- 111, 107, 104, 100 – Ryan Day
- 110 – Jamie Jones
- 109, 107 – Zhang Anda
- 108 – Tian Pengfei
- 104 – Michael Georgiou
- 104 – Craig Steadman
- 100 – Oliver Brown
- 100 – Zhao Xintong

=== Qualifying rounds centuries ===
Total: 5

- 125 – James Cahill
- 124 – Ian Martin
- 114 – Steven Hallworth
- 114 – Saqib Nasir
- 104 – Joe O'Connor
