= 2017 Snooker Shoot Out =

2017 Coral Snooker Shoot Out
Tournament information
- Dates: 23–26 February 2017
- Venue: Watford Colosseum
- City: Watford
- Country: England
- Organisation: World Snooker
- Format: Ranking event
- Total prize fund: £146,000
- Winner's share: £32,000
- Highest break: Graeme Dott (SCO) (96)

Final
- Champion: Anthony McGill (SCO)
- Runner-up: Xiao Guodong (CHN)
- Score: 67–19 (one frame)

The 2017 Shoot Out (officially the 2017 Coral Snooker Shoot Out) was a professional ranking snooker tournament which took place at the Watford Colosseum in Watford from 23 to 26 February 2017. It was played under a variation of the standard rules of snooker. In 2017 it was extended from 64 to 128 players, and became a ranking tournament for the first time in its history. It was the 15th ranking event of the 2016/2017 season.

Robin Hull was the defending champion, but he lost 18–25 to Fergal O'Brien in the second round.

Anthony McGill won his second ranking title, beating Xiao Guodong 67–19 in the final.

This was the first time that no century break was made in the competition. The highest break was a 96 from Graeme Dott. This was the 300th ranking event to be staged in snooker.

== Tournament format ==
The tournament was played using a variation of the traditional snooker rules. The draw was randomised before each round. All matches were played over a single frame, each of which lasted up to 10 minutes. The event featured a variable shot clock; shots played in the first five minutes were allowed 15 seconds while the final five had a 10-second timer. All foul shots awarded the opponent a ball in hand. Unlike traditional snooker, if a ball did not hit a cushion on every shot, it was a foul. Rather than a coin toss, a lag was used to choose which player breaks. In the event of a draw, each player received a shot at the blue ball this is known as a "blue ball shootout". The player who potted the ball with the cue ball from inside the D and the blue ball on its spot with the opponent missing won the match.

=== Prize fund ===
The breakdown of prize money for this year is shown below.

- Winner: £32,000
- Runner-up: £16,000
- Semi-final: £8,000
- Quarter-final: £4,000
- Last 16: £2,000
- Last 32: £1,000
- Last 64: £500
- Last 128: £250
- Highest break: £2,000
- Total: £146,000
- The "rolling 147 prize" for a maximum break stood at £15,000.

== Tournament draw ==
All times in Greenwich Mean Time. Times for quarter-finals, semi-finals and final are approximate. Players in bold denote match winners.

=== Round 1 ===
==== 23 February – 12:00 ====
- Mei Xiwen (CHN) 40–**74** **Robin Hull** (FIN)
- Duane Jones (WAL) 18–**32** **Sunny Akani** (THA)
- Zhou Yuelong (CHN) 22–**74** **Jack Lisowski** (ENG)
- Sanderson Lam (ENG) 7–**80** **Bradley Jones** (ENG)
- **Mark Joyce** (ENG) **61**–41 Joe Perry (ENG)
- **Liam Highfield** (ENG) **60**–4 Oliver Brown (ENG)
- Ian Burns (ENG) 39–**42** **Daniel Wells** (WAL)
- Igor Figueiredo (BRA) 4–**80** **John Astley** (ENG)
- **Nigel Bond** (ENG) **46**–36 Mark Allen (NIR)
- **James Cahill** (ENG) **55**–23 Robbie Williams (ENG)
- Alex Borg (MLT) 35–**89** **Thepchaiya Un-Nooh** (THA)
- **Anthony McGill** (SCO) **43**–22 Oliver Lines (ENG)
- Sean O'Sullivan (ENG) 8–**94** **Dominic Dale** (WAL)
- Craig Steadman (ENG) 16–**52** **Jak Jones** (WAL)
- **Michael White** (WAL) **64**–24 Alan McManus (SCO)
- Boonyarit Keattikun (THA) 15–**67** **Steven Hallworth** (ENG)
- **Darryl Hill** (IOM) **47**–26 Kurt Maflin (NOR)
- **Scott Donaldson** (SCO) **52**–43 Thor Chuan Leong (MAS)
- **Mark King** (ENG) **50**–43 Adam Duffy (ENG)
- **Cao Yupeng** (CHN) **65**–5 Marc J Davis (SCO)
- **Michael Holt** (ENG) **29**–28 Joshua Thomond (ENG)
- **David John** (WAL) **84**–0 Charlie Walters (ENG)
- **Eden Sharav** (SCO) **59**–33 Gareth Allen (WAL)
- Hatem Yassen (EGY) 4–**37** **Barry Hawkins** (ENG)

==== 23 February – 19:00 ====
- Louis Heathcote (ENG) 1–**78** **Jimmy White** (ENG)
- Michael Collumb (SCO) 6–**54** **Joe Swail** (NIR)
- Michael Wild (ENG) 30–**47** **Daniel Womersley** (ENG)
- **Jamie Curtis-Barrett** (ENG) **58**–18 Sam Baird (ENG)
- **Zhao Xintong** (CHN) **47**–43 Mark Davis (ENG)
- **Sam Craigie** (ENG) **68**–14 Mike Dunn (ENG)
- Adam Stefanow (POL) 37–**68** **Fang Xiongman** (CHN)
- Rod Lawler (ENG) 4–**30** **Xiao Guodong** (CHN)
- Dechawat Poomjaeng (THA) 22–**56** **Fraser Patrick** (SCO)
- Josh Boileau (IRL) 11–**58** **Zhang Yong** (CHN)
- Yan Bingtao (CHN) 19–**56** **Hossein Vafaei** (IRI)
- Sydney Wilson (ENG) 4–**92** **Andy Hicks** (ENG)
- Matthew Selt (ENG) 7–**69** **Jason Weston** (ENG)
- Itaro Santos (BRA) 26–**108** **Chen Zhe** (CHN)
- **Chris Wakelin** (ENG) **66**–16 Tom Ford (ENG)
- **Graeme Dott** (SCO) **96**–0 Mitchell Mann (ENG)

==== 24 February – 12:00 ====
- Aditya Mehta (IND) 35–**45** **Ken Doherty** (IRL)
- Lee Walker (WAL) 44–**50** **Luca Brecel** (BEL)
- **Andrew Higginson** (ENG) **65**–34 Ian Preece (WAL)
- **Rhys Clark** (SCO) **32**–29 Rory McLeod (ENG)
- **Fergal O'Brien** (IRL) **79**–0 Ryan Day (WAL)
- Zhang Anda (CHN) 39–**67** **Shaun Murphy** (ENG)
- **Liang Wenbo** (CHN) **109**–1 Matthew Stevens (WAL)
- **Alfie Burden** (ENG) **51**–24 Ben Woollaston (ENG)
- Zak Surety (ENG) 13–**57** **Robert Milkins** (ENG)
- **Ross Muir** (SCO) **39**–32 Martin O'Donnell (ENG)
- Kurt Dunham (AUS) 32–**64** **Stuart Carrington** (ENG)
- **David Gilbert** (ENG) **39**–25 Wang Yuchen (CHN)
- Kyren Wilson (ENG) 7–**48** **David Grace** (ENG)
- **Tian Pengfei** (CHN) **43**–20 Peter Lines (ENG)
- **Jimmy Robertson** (ENG) **94**–17 Elliot Slessor (ENG)
- **Allan Taylor** (ENG) **64**–22 Christopher Keogan (ENG)
- Jamie Cope (ENG) 16–**68** **Michael Georgiou** (CYP)
- Hammad Miah (ENG) 27–**67** **Ricky Walden** (ENG)
- **Ashley Hugill** (ENG) **66**–32 Paul Davison (ENG)
- **Li Hang** (CHN) **48**–13 Brandon Sargeant (ENG)
- Gary Wilson (ENG) 8–**61** **Anthony Hamilton** (ENG)
- **Noppon Saengkham** (THA) **54**–18 Martin Gould (ENG)
- **Hamza Akbar** (PAK) **53**–48 Stuart Bingham (ENG)
- Jamie Jones (WAL) 9–**62** **Mark Williams** (WAL)

=== Round 2 ===
==== 24 February – 19:00 ====
- **Shaun Murphy** (ENG) **56**–8 John Astley (ENG)
- Jason Weston (ENG) 40–**69** **Alfie Burden** (ENG)
- David John (WAL) 13–**50** **Liam Highfield** (ENG)
- Zhao Xintong (CHN) 19–**60** **Ken Doherty** (IRL)
- **David Gilbert** (ENG) **40**–6 Sunny Akani (THA)
- Rhys Clark (SCO) 1–**72** **Jimmy Robertson** (ENG)
- **Mark King** (ENG) **52**–23 Andrew Higginson (ENG)
- Michael Holt (ENG) 8–**30** **Ross Muir** (SCO)
- **Jimmy White** (ENG) **45**–44 Chen Zhe (CHN)
- Chris Wakelin (ENG) 33–**53** **Jack Lisowski** (ENG)
- Jamie Curtis-Barrett (ENG) 12–**30** **Anthony McGill** (SCO)
- Mark Joyce (ENG) 23–**32** **Sam Craigie** (ENG)
- **Cao Yupeng** (CHN) **42**–32 Liang Wenbo (CHN)
- **Daniel Wells** (WAL) **56**–42 Thepchaiya Un-Nooh (THA)
- **Dominic Dale** (WAL) **78**–24 Hossein Vafaei (IRI)
- Robin Hull (FIN) 18–**25** **Fergal O'Brien** (IRL)

==== 25 February – 19:00 ====
- Barry Hawkins (ENG) 25–**61** **Eden Sharav** (SCO)
- Fang Xiongman (CHN) 0–**115** **Anthony Hamilton** (ENG)
- Nigel Bond (ENG) 32–**66** **Zhang Yong** (CHN)
- **Ashley Hugill** (ENG) **62**–8 Stuart Carrington (ENG)
- **Michael Georgiou** (CYP) **73**–1 Ricky Walden (ENG)
- Hamza Akbar (PAK) 8–**77** **Xiao Guodong** (CHN)
- **Joe Swail** (NIR) **56**–16 Allan Taylor (ENG)
- **Li Hang** (CHN) **32**–16 Graeme Dott (SCO)
- **Luca Brecel** (BEL) **34**–17 Scott Donaldson (SCO)
- **Steven Hallworth** (ENG) **58**–1 Michael White (WAL)
- Noppon Saengkham (THA) 35–**54** **James Cahill** (ENG)
- Fraser Patrick (SCO) 3–**50** **Jak Jones** (WAL)
- **Darryl Hill** (IOM) **34**–27 Bradley Jones (ENG)
- **Daniel Womersley** (ENG) **56**–39 Robert Milkins (ENG)
- Tian Pengfei (CHN) 35–**55** **David Grace** (ENG)
- **Andy Hicks** (ENG) **58**–35 Mark Williams (WAL)

=== Round 3 ===
==== 26 February – 12:00 ====
- Zhang Yong (CHN) 15–**58** **Andy Hicks** (ENG)
- Joe Swail (NIR) 26–**40** **Jak Jones** (WAL)
- James Cahill (ENG) 1–**63** **Ken Doherty** (IRL)
- Sam Craigie (ENG) 37–**61** **Shaun Murphy** (ENG)
- **Cao Yupeng** (CHN) **85**–10 Jimmy Robertson (ENG)
- **David Grace** (ENG) **54**–11 Dominic Dale (WAL)
- **Fergal O'Brien** (IRL) **61**–46 Liam Highfield (ENG)
- Luca Brecel (BEL) 0–**98** **Anthony Hamilton** (ENG)
- **Anthony McGill** (SCO) **57**–28 Mark King (ENG)
- Ashley Hugill (ENG) 6–**41** **Michael Georgiou** (CYP)
- **Xiao Guodong** (CHN) **25**–21 Daniel Womersley (ENG)
- **Jack Lisowski** (ENG) **60**–22 Eden Sharav (SCO)
- Darryl Hill (IOM) 13–**60** **Li Hang** (CHN)
- Alfie Burden (ENG) 12–**50** **David Gilbert** (ENG)
- Daniel Wells (WAL) 24–**48** **Steven Hallworth** (ENG)
- **Ross Muir** (SCO) **71**–0 Jimmy White (ENG)

=== Round 4 ===
==== 26 February – 18:00 ====
- **Anthony Hamilton** (ENG) **71**–5 Ross Muir (SCO)
- **Andy Hicks** (ENG) **38**–15 Michael Georgiou (CYP)
- **Shaun Murphy** (ENG) **73**–29 Jak Jones (WAL)
- Jack Lisowski (ENG) 0–**78** **Anthony McGill** (SCO)
- **Xiao Guodong** (CHN) **68**–9 Ken Doherty (IRL)
- Cao Yupeng (CHN) 14–**58** **David Grace** (ENG)
- Fergal O'Brien (IRL) 1–**79** **David Gilbert** (ENG)
- Li Hang (CHN) 30–**50** **Steven Hallworth** (ENG)

=== Quarter-finals ===
==== 26 February – 20:00 ====
- **Xiao Guodong** (CHN) **23**–14 David Gilbert (ENG)
- Anthony Hamilton (ENG) 19–**36** **Anthony McGill** (SCO)
- **Shaun Murphy** (ENG) **76**–14 David Grace (ENG)
- **Andy Hicks** (ENG) **24**–17 Steven Hallworth (ENG)

=== Semi-finals ===
==== 26 February – 21:15 ====
- **Xiao Guodong** (CHN) **73**–0 Andy Hicks (ENG)
- Shaun Murphy (ENG) 41–**64** **Anthony McGill** (SCO)

=== Final ===
Final: 1 frame. Referee: Andy Yates; Watford Colosseum, Watford, England, 26 February 2017 – 21:45
Xiao Guodong; China	19–**67**	**Anthony McGill**; Scotland
