= 2018 Welsh Open (snooker) =

2018 ManBetX Welsh Open
Tournament information
- Dates: 26 February – 4 March 2018
- Venue: Motorpoint Arena
- City: Cardiff
- Country: Wales
- Organisation: World Snooker
- Format: Ranking event
- Total prize fund: £366,000
- Winner's share: £70,000
- Highest break: John Higgins (SCO) (144)

Final
- Champion: John Higgins (SCO)
- Runner-up: Barry Hawkins (ENG)
- Score: 9–7

The 2018 Welsh Open (officially the 2018 ManBetX Welsh Open) was a professional ranking snooker tournament, that took place from 26 February to 4 March 2018 at the Motorpoint Arena in Cardiff, Wales. It was the sixteenth ranking event of the 2017/2018 season and a part of the Home Nations Series.

The defending champion Stuart Bingham lost 1–4 to Matthew Stevens in the last 32.

John Higgins won a record fifth Welsh Open title, and his 30th ranking title overall, beating Barry Hawkins 9–7 in the final.

== Prize fund ==
The breakdown of prize money for this year is shown below:

- Winner: £70,000
- Runner-up: £30,000
- Semi-final: £20,000
- Quarter-final: £10,000
- Last 16: £6,000
- Last 32: £3,500
- Last 64: £2,500
- Highest break: £2,000
- Total: £366,000

The "rolling 147 prize" for a maximum break stood at £20,000

== Main draw ==
=== Qualifying round ===
(Wales) Rhydian Richards 4–3 (Wales) Darren Morgan

=== Top half ===
==== Section 1 ====
Last 128; Best of 7 frames
(England) Stuart Bingham (1)	4
(China) Chen Zhe	1
(Wales) Jackson Page	4
(England) Sean O'Sullivan	3
(Scotland) Scott Donaldson	4
(Republic of Ireland) Fergal O'Brien	2
(Wales) Matthew Stevens	4
(Republic of Ireland) Ken Doherty	1
(Wales) Ryan Day (16)	2
(Australia) Kurt Dunham	4
(England) Jimmy White	3
(China) Yan Bingtao	4
(China) Wang Yuchen	1
(England) Peter Ebdon	4
(England) Anthony Hamilton	4
(England) David Gilbert	3

Last 64; Best of 7 frames
(England) Stuart Bingham (1)	4
(Wales) Jackson Page	2
(Scotland) Scott Donaldson	2
(Wales) Matthew Stevens	4
(Australia) Kurt Dunham	2
(China) Yan Bingtao	4
(England) Peter Ebdon	4
(England) Anthony Hamilton	1

Last 32; Best of 7 frames
(England) Stuart Bingham (1)	1
(Wales) Matthew Stevens	4
(China) Yan Bingtao	4
(England) Peter Ebdon	1

Last 16; Best of 7 frames
(Wales) Matthew Stevens	2
(China) Yan Bingtao	4

==== Section 2 ====
Last 128; Best of 7 frames
(China) Fang Xiongman	4
(China) Yuan Sijun	3
(China) Chen Zifan	4
(China) Zhou Yuelong	1
(England) Rod Lawler	0
(England) Tom Ford	4
(England) Barry Hawkins (9)	4
(China) Niu Zhuang	1
(China) Li Yuan	1
(England) Ricky Walden	4
(Wales) Michael White	2
(England) Martin Gould	4
(India) Aditya Mehta	4
(England) Martin O'Donnell	3
(Wales) Mark Williams (8)	4
(England) Mark King	2

Last 64; Best of 7 frames
(China) Fang Xiongman	4
(China) Chen Zifan	2
(England) Tom Ford	0
(England) Barry Hawkins (9)	4
(England) Ricky Walden	3
(England) Martin Gould	4
(India) Aditya Mehta	3
(Wales) Mark Williams (8)	4

Last 32; Best of 7 frames
(China) Fang Xiongman	2
(England) Barry Hawkins (9)	4
(England) Martin Gould	4
(Wales) Mark Williams (8)	2

Last 16; Best of 7 frames
(England) Barry Hawkins (9)	4
(England) Martin Gould	2

==== Section 3 ====
Last 128; Best of 7 frames
(China) Ding Junhui (5)	4
(England) Hammad Miah	0
(China) Li Hang	w/d
(England) Liam Highfield	w/o
(China) Xiao Guodong	0
(England) Chris Wakelin	4
(England) Andrew Higginson	4
(England) Ashley Hugill	3
(Australia) Neil Robertson (12)	4
(England) Mark Davis	1
(England) Jamie Curtis-Barrett	1
(England) Ian Burns	4
(Wales) Jamie Jones	4
(Switzerland) Alexander Ursenbacher	1
(China) Tian Pengfei	1
(Thailand) Sunny Akani	4

Last 64; Best of 7 frames
(China) Ding Junhui (5)	1
(England) Liam Highfield	4
(England) Chris Wakelin	4
(England) Andrew Higginson	2
(Australia) Neil Robertson (12)	3
(England) Ian Burns	4
(Wales) Jamie Jones	1
(Thailand) Sunny Akani	4

Last 32; Best of 7 frames
(England) Liam Highfield	4
(England) Chris Wakelin	1
(England) Ian Burns	4
(Thailand) Sunny Akani	2

Last 16; Best of 7 frames
(England) Liam Highfield	3
(England) Ian Burns	4

==== Section 4 ====
Last 128; Best of 7 frames
(China) Zhang Yong	1
(Thailand) James Wattana	4
(England) Michael Holt	4
(England) Elliot Slessor	2
(England) Rory McLeod	4
(England) Adam Duffy	2
(England) Kyren Wilson (13)	4
(England) Robert Milkins	1
(England) Craig Steadman	4
(Wales) David John	1
(Iran) Hossein Vafaei	2
(Thailand) Thepchaiya Un-Nooh	4
(Thailand) Noppon Saengkham	4
(Scotland) Ross Muir	2
(England) Judd Trump (4)	4
(Wales) Duane Jones	3

Last 64; Best of 7 frames
(Thailand) James Wattana	4
(England) Michael Holt	2
(England) Rory McLeod	0
(England) Kyren Wilson (13)	4
(England) Craig Steadman	4
(Thailand) Thepchaiya Un-Nooh	2
(Thailand) Noppon Saengkham	4
(England) Judd Trump (4)	1

Last 32; Best of 7 frames
(Thailand) James Wattana	3
(England) Kyren Wilson (13)	4
(England) Craig Steadman	2
(Thailand) Noppon Saengkham	4

Last 16; Best of 7 frames
(England) Kyren Wilson (13)	0
(Thailand) Noppon Saengkham	4

=== Bottom half ===
==== Section 5 ====
Last 128; Best of 7 frames
(England) Ronnie O'Sullivan (3)	w/o
(Finland) Robin Hull	w/d
(England) Sanderson Lam	0
(Scotland) Graeme Dott	4
(England) David Grace	4
(Wales) Rhydian Richards	3
(China) Mei Xiwen	3
(Wales) Jak Jones	4
(Belgium) Luca Brecel (14)	4
(Republic of Ireland) Josh Boileau	2
(Pakistan) Hamza Akbar	0
(England) Mike Dunn	4
(Scotland) Alan McManus	0
(China) Xu Si	4
(England) Mitchell Mann	0
(Cyprus) Michael Georgiou	4

Last 64; Best of 7 frames
(England) Ronnie O'Sullivan (3)	4
(Scotland) Graeme Dott	0
(England) David Grace	4
(Wales) Jak Jones	0
(Belgium) Luca Brecel (14)	1
(England) Mike Dunn	4
(China) Xu Si	4
(Cyprus) Michael Georgiou	2

Last 32; Best of 7 frames
(England) Ronnie O'Sullivan (3)	4
(England) David Grace	0
(England) Mike Dunn	4
(China) Xu Si	2

Last 16; Best of 7 frames
(England) Ronnie O'Sullivan (3)	4
(England) Mike Dunn	0

==== Section 6 ====
Last 128; Best of 7 frames
(England) Paul Davison	2
(China) Lyu Haotian	4
(England) Jack Lisowski	4
(England) Mark Joyce	3
(England) Nigel Bond	4
(Germany) Lukas Kleckers	2
(England) Ali Carter (11)	4
(Scotland) Rhys Clark	0
(England) Sam Craigie	4
(Republic of Ireland) Leo Fernandez	0
(England) Jimmy Robertson	0
(Norway) Kurt Maflin	4
(England) Joe Perry	2
(Scotland) Stephen Maguire	4
(Scotland) John Higgins (6)	4
(England) Matthew Selt	2

Last 64; Best of 7 frames
(China) Lyu Haotian	2
(England) Jack Lisowski	4
(England) Nigel Bond	4
(England) Ali Carter (11)	3
(England) Sam Craigie	4
(Norway) Kurt Maflin	1
(Scotland) Stephen Maguire	1
(Scotland) John Higgins (6)	4

Last 32; Best of 7 frames
(England) Jack Lisowski	3
(England) Nigel Bond	4
(England) Sam Craigie	0
(Scotland) John Higgins (6)	4

Last 16; Best of 7 frames
(England) Nigel Bond	0
(Scotland) John Higgins (6)	4

==== Section 7 ====
Last 128; Best of 7 frames
(England) Shaun Murphy (7)	0
(Northern Ireland) Gerard Greene	4
(England) Stuart Carrington	4
(England) Peter Lines	3
(Wales) Dominic Dale	4
(Scotland) Chris Totten	0
(England) John Astley	4
(China) Zhang Anda	2
(Northern Ireland) Mark Allen (10)	4
(China) Cao Yupeng	2
(Malta) Alex Borg	0
(Iran) Soheil Vahedi	4
(England) Gary Wilson	4
(England) Sam Baird	1
(Wales) Daniel Wells	4
(Wales) Lee Walker	1

Last 64; Best of 7 frames
(Northern Ireland) Gerard Greene	4
(England) Stuart Carrington	3
(Wales) Dominic Dale	2
(England) John Astley	4
(Northern Ireland) Mark Allen (10)	4
(Iran) Soheil Vahedi	1
(England) Gary Wilson	4
(Wales) Daniel Wells	3

Last 32; Best of 7 frames
(Northern Ireland) Gerard Greene	3
(England) John Astley	4
(Northern Ireland) Mark Allen (10)	3
(England) Gary Wilson	4

Last 16; Best of 7 frames
(England) John Astley	2
(England) Gary Wilson	4

==== Section 8 ====
Last 128; Best of 7 frames
(England) Oliver Lines	4
(Scotland) Eden Sharav	3
(China) Yu Delu	4
(England) Billy Joe Castle	2
(Malaysia) Thor Chuan Leong	3
(England) Ben Woollaston	4
(Scotland) Anthony McGill (15)	4
(Egypt) Basem Eltahhan	1
(England) Robbie Williams	4
(England) Allan Taylor	0
(Wales) Ian Preece	4
(China) Zhao Xintong	2
(England) Alfie Burden	3
(China) Liang Wenbo	4
(England) Christopher Keogan	2
(England) Mark Selby (2)	4

Last 64; Best of 7 frames
(England) Oliver Lines	2
(China) Yu Delu	4
(England) Ben Woollaston	4
(Scotland) Anthony McGill (15)	3
(England) Robbie Williams	4
(Wales) Ian Preece	0
(China) Liang Wenbo	4
(England) Mark Selby (2)	3

Last 32; Best of 7 frames
(China) Yu Delu	4
(England) Ben Woollaston	0
(England) Robbie Williams	3
(China) Liang Wenbo	4

Last 16; Best of 7 frames
(China) Yu Delu	4
(China) Liang Wenbo	1

=== Finals ===
Quarter-finals; Best of 9 frames
(China) Yan Bingtao	1
(England) Barry Hawkins (9)	5
(England) Ian Burns	3
(Thailand) Noppon Saengkham	5
(England) Ronnie O'Sullivan (3)	1
(Scotland) John Higgins (6)	5
(England) Gary Wilson	5
(China) Yu Delu	2

Semi-finals; Best of 11 frames
(England) Barry Hawkins (9)	6
(Thailand) Noppon Saengkham	4
(Scotland) John Higgins (6)	6
(England) Gary Wilson	2

Final; Best of 17 frames
(England) Barry Hawkins (9)	7
(Scotland) John Higgins (6)	9

== Final ==
Final: Best of 17 frames. Referee: Terry Camilleri. Motorpoint Arena, Cardiff, Wales, 4 March 2018.
Barry Hawkins (9); England	7–9	John Higgins (6); Scotland
Afternoon: 66–55, 0–138 (138), 70–68, 0–141 (141), 66–16, 131–0 (130), 14–83, 15–73; Evening: 1–56, 44–59, 125–6 (103), 142–0 (138), 44–70, 55–65, 82–0, 0–72
138	Highest break	141
3	Century breaks	2

== Century breaks ==
Total: 66

- 144, 141, 138, 136, 115,
  113, 107, 106, 101, 100 – John Higgins
- 143, 100 – Mark Selby
- 141, 138, 137, 130, 103 – Barry Hawkins
- 141, 110 – Martin Gould
- 140, 124, 105, 101 – Gary Wilson
- 139, 120, 102 – Noppon Saengkham
- 136, 105, 100, 100 – Kyren Wilson
- 134, 129, 106 – Mark Williams
- 133, 117, 106, 100 – Ronnie O'Sullivan
- 131, 106 – Ian Burns
- 131, 101 – Thepchaiya Un-Nooh
- 130, 100, 100 – Neil Robertson
- 129, 115 – Elliot Slessor
- 129 – Ben Woollaston
- 124 – Cao Yupeng
- 119, 116 – Mark Allen
- 118 – Zhang Anda
- 118 – Stuart Bingham
- 115 – Liam Highfield
- 114, 104, 104, 103 – Jack Lisowski
- 111, 108 – Sunny Akani
- 111 – Robbie Williams
- 110 – Yan Bingtao
- 107 – Ryan Day
- 104 – Mark King
- 103 – Kurt Dunham
- 102 – Gerard Greene
- 102 – Stephen Maguire
