= Hamza Akbar =

Pakistani snooker player

Personal information
- Born: November 12, 1993 (age 32) Faisalabad, Pakistan

Sport
- Country: Pakistan
- Sport: Snooker
- Professional: 2015–2019
- Highest ranking: 81 (June 2016)
- Best ranking finish: Last 32 (x3)

Hamza Akbar (Urdu:حمزه اكبر; born 12 November 1993) is a Pakistani former professional snooker player who won the 31st Asian Snooker Championship held in Kuala Lumpur, Malaysia in 2015. He is also the Pakistan national champion 2015.

== Career ==
Born in Faisalabad city of Pakistan, Akbar is a two-time national snooker champion. Akbar won his first major international title at the age 22, beating Pankaj Advani of India 7–6 in the final in of Asian Snooker Championship in Kuala Lumpur, Malaysia in April 2015 to become the third player from Pakistan in 16 years to win Asia's top snooker title. The title earned him a two-year card for the main snooker tour, beginning with the 2015–16 season.

He threatened a comeback from 4–0 against two-time world champion Mark Williams in the first round of the 2015 UK Championship, but lost 6–4. He took Michael Holt to a deciding frame in the opening round of the Welsh Open and made a break of 52, but was beaten 4–3. His most remarkable performance in his first season on the main tour came at the World Snooker Championship where he defeated world number 33 Jamie Jones 10–5 in the first qualifying round, before losing 10–3 to Ian Burns.

Akbar qualified for the 2016 Indian Open by overcoming Chris Wakelin 4–1, but could not attend the event because India refused to grant him a visa. He received a bye through to the second round of the Northern Ireland Open and lost 4–2 to Josh Boileau. Akbar would have dropped off the tour at the end of the season due to being ranked world number 112, well outside the top 64 who remain, but he received special dispensation and received a new two-year tour card due to his visa problems which have forced him to miss many events in the past.

He practices at Oldham Snooker Academy.

== Performance and rankings timeline ==
Tournament	2015/ 16	2016/ 17	2017/ 18	2018/ 19	2019/ 20
Ranking (Note: It shows the ranking at the beginning of the season)	(Note: New players on the Main Tour don't have a ranking)	81	(Note: Players qualified through special dispensation started the season without prize money ranking points)	89	(Note: He was an amateur)
Ranking tournaments
Riga Masters (Note: The event was called the Riga Open (2015/2016))	MR	LQ	LQ	A	LQ
International Championship	LQ	LQ	LQ	LQ	A
China Championship	NH	NR	LQ	LQ	A
English Open	NH	1R	1R	1R	A
World Open	NH	LQ	WD	A	A
Northern Ireland Open	NH	2R	1R	3R	A
UK Championship	1R	1R	1R	1R	A
Scottish Open	NH	A	2R	1R	A
European Masters	NH	LQ	WD	LQ	A
German Masters	LQ	A	LQ	LQ	A
World Grand Prix	DNQ	DNQ	DNQ	DNQ	DNQ
Welsh Open	1R	1R	1R	1R	A
Shoot Out	NR	2R	3R	2R	A
Players Championship (Note: The event was called the Players Tour Championship Grand Final (2015/2016))	DNQ	DNQ	DNQ	DNQ	DNQ
Gibraltar Open	MR	1R	1R	3R	A
Tour Championship	Not Held			DNQ	DNQ
World Championship	LQ	LQ	LQ	LQ	WD
Former ranking tournaments
Shanghai Masters	WD	LQ	LQ	Non-Ranking	
Paul Hunter Classic	MR	WD	WD	A	NR
Indian Open	NH	WD	WD	WD	NH
China Open	LQ	WD	1R	LQ	NH

Performance Table Legend
LQ	lost in the qualifying draw	#R	lost in the early rounds of the tournament (WR = Wildcard round, RR = Round robin)	QF	lost in the quarter-finals
SF	lost in the semi-finals	F	lost in the final	W	won the tournament
DNQ	did not qualify for the tournament	A	did not participate in the tournament	WD	withdrew from the tournament

NH / Not Held	means an event was not held.
NR / Non-Ranking Event	means an event is/was no longer a ranking event.
R / Ranking Event	means an event is/was a ranking event.
MR / Minor-Ranking Event	means an event is/was a minor-ranking event.

== Career finals ==
=== Amateur finals: 4 (3 titles) ===
Outcome	No.	Year	Championship	Opponent in the final	Score
Winner	1.	2013	Pakistan National Championship	(Pakistan) Imran Shahzad	8–7
Runner-up	1.	2014	Pakistan National Championship	(Pakistan) Mohammad Asif Toba	5–8
Winner	2.	2015	Pakistan National Championship	(Pakistan) Shahram Changezi	8–4
Winner	3.	2015	ACBS Asian Snooker Championship	(India) Pankaj Advani	7–6
