= Kurt Dunham =

Australian snooker player

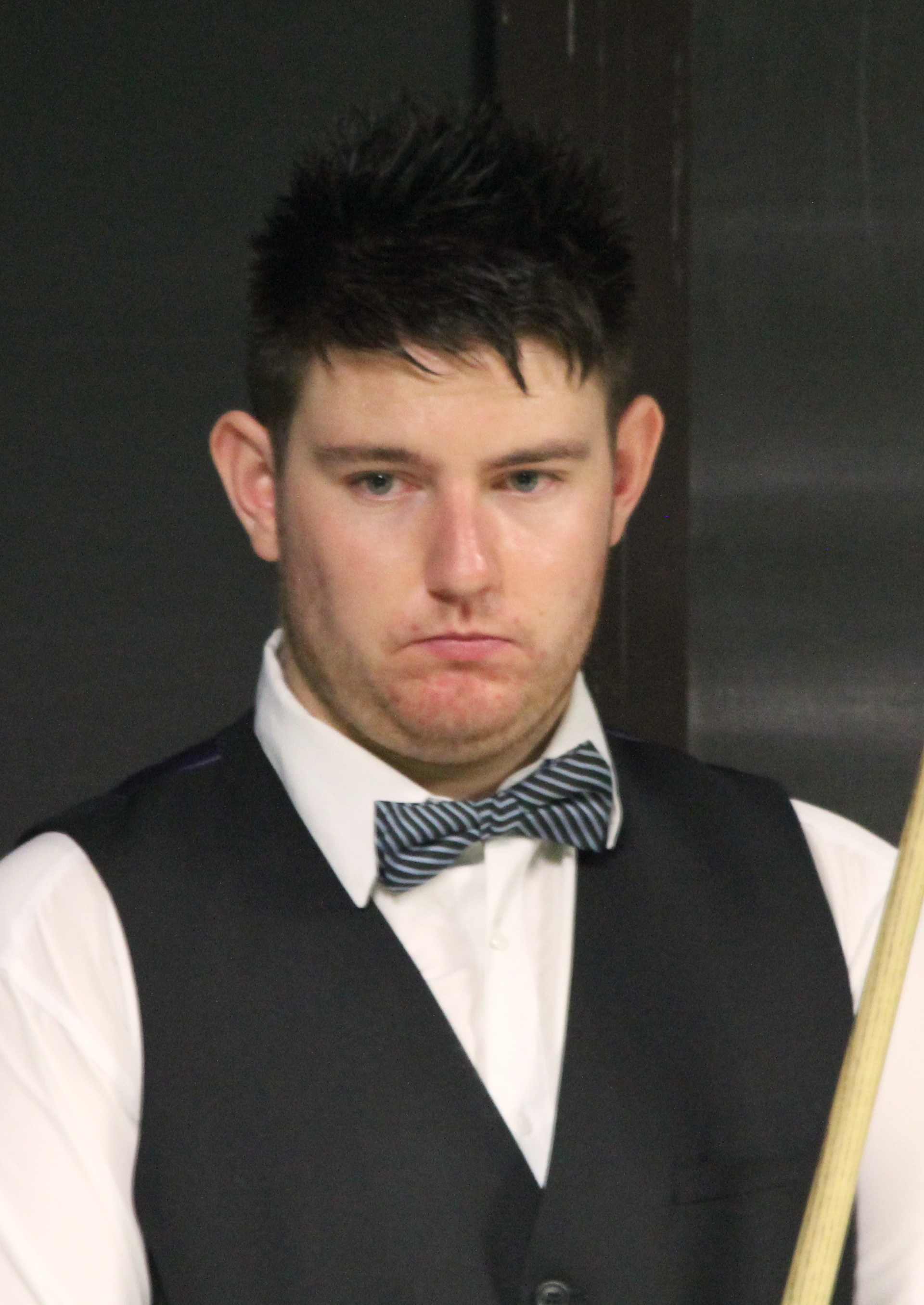
- Paul Hunter Classic 2016

Personal information
- Born: 6 December 1991 (age 34) Somerset, Tasmania

Sport
- Country: Australia
- Sport: Snooker
- Professional: 2016–2018
- Highest ranking: 94 (June 2017)
- Best ranking finish: Last 32 (x1)

Kurt Dunham (born 6 December 1991 in Somerset, Tasmania) is a former Australian professional snooker player.

== Career ==
Dunham turned professional in 2016 as the Oceania nomination for the 2016–17 season. His two match wins during his first season as a professional were against Alex Borg and Christopher Keogan at the Paul Hunter Classic and Northern Ireland Open respectively.

== Performance and rankings timeline ==
Tournament	2016/ 17	2017/ 18
Ranking (Note: It shows the ranking at the beginning of the season.)	(Note: New players on the Main Tour don't have a ranking.)	94
Ranking tournaments
Riga Masters	LQ	LQ
China Championship	NR	LQ
Paul Hunter Classic	2R	1R
Indian Open	LQ	LQ
World Open	LQ	LQ
European Masters	LQ	LQ
English Open	1R	1R
International Championship	LQ	LQ
Shanghai Masters	LQ	LQ
Northern Ireland Open	2R	1R
UK Championship	1R	1R
Scottish Open	1R	2R
German Masters	LQ	LQ
Shoot-Out	1R	3R
World Grand Prix	DNQ	DNQ
Welsh Open	1R	2R
Gibraltar Open	1R	2R
Players Championship	DNQ	DNQ
China Open	LQ	LQ
World Championship	LQ	LQ

Performance Table Legend
LQ	lost in the qualifying draw	#R	lost in the early rounds of the tournament (WR = Wildcard round, RR = Round robin)	QF	lost in the quarter-finals
SF	lost in the semi-finals	F	lost in the final	W	won the tournament
DNQ	did not qualify for the tournament	A	did not participate in the tournament	WD	withdrew from the tournament

NH / Not Held	means an event was not held.
NR / Non-Ranking Event	means an event is/was no longer a ranking event.
R / Ranking Event	means an event is/was a ranking event.
MR / Minor-Ranking Event	means an event is/was a minor-ranking event.
