= 2019–20 snooker world rankings =

Preceded by 2018–19	2019–20	Succeeded by 2020–21

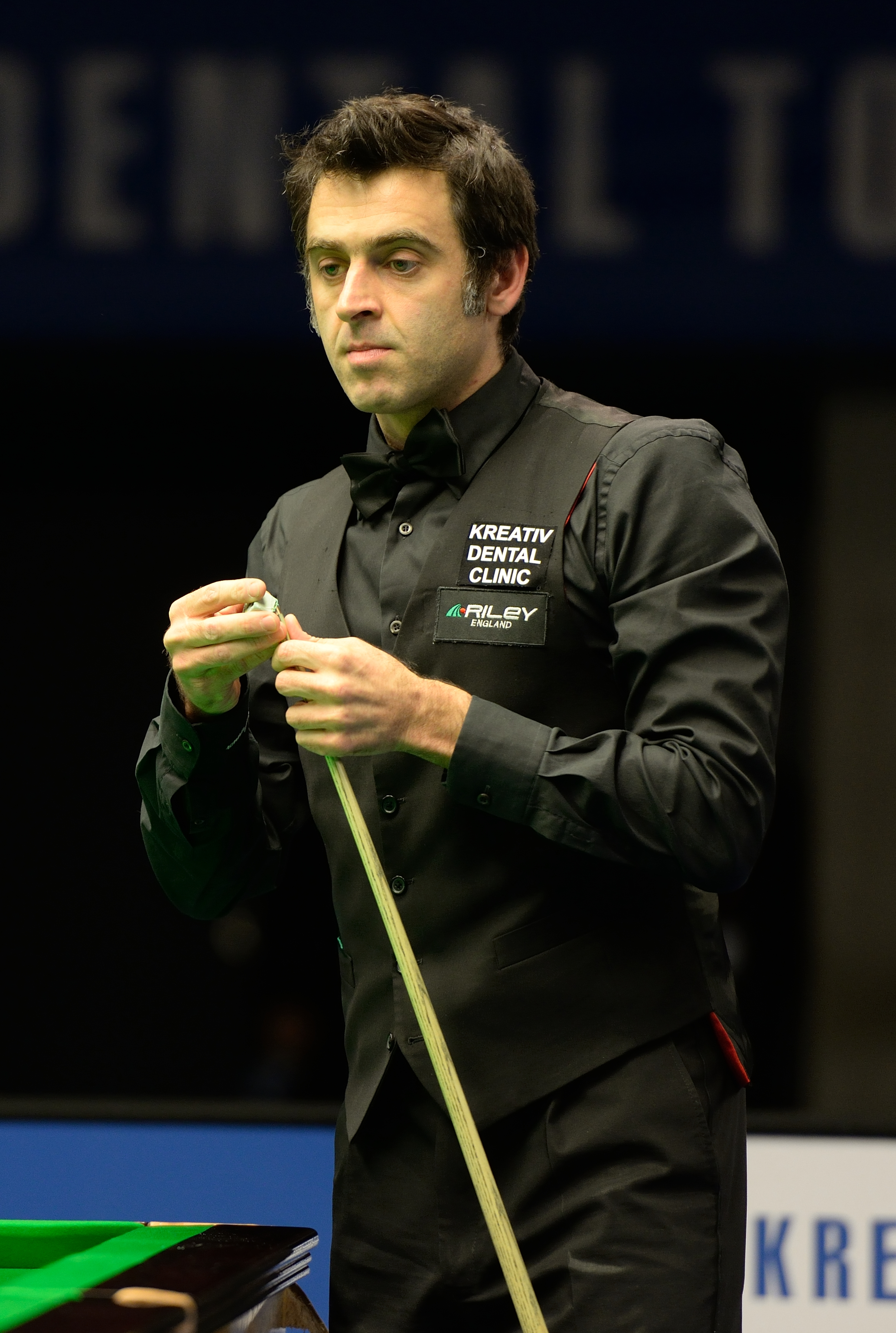
Ronnie O'Sullivan (pictured above) started the season as the highest ranked player, but was replaced by Judd Trump (pictured below) after the second revision.

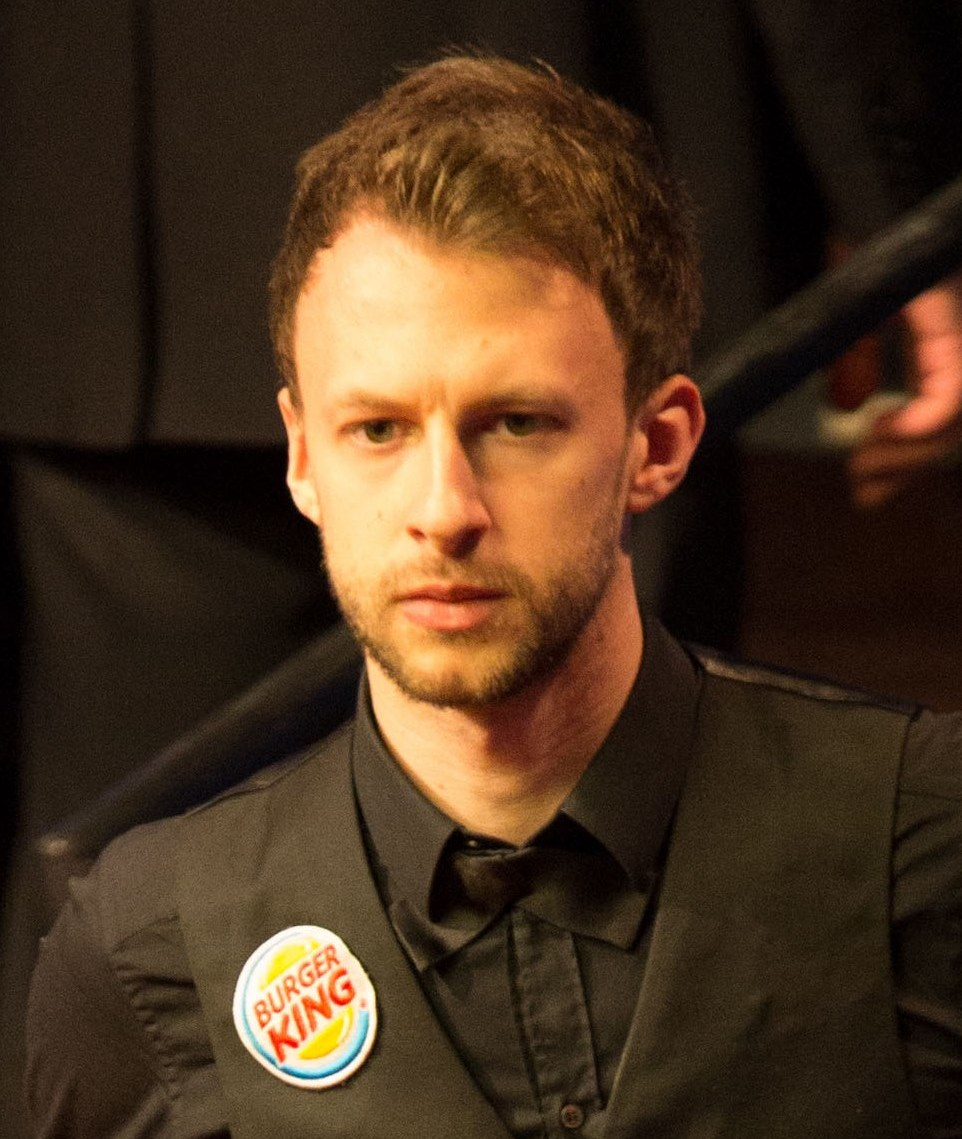

The sport of professional snooker has had a world ranking system in place since 1976. Certain tournaments were given "ranking" status, with the results at those events contributing to a player's world ranking. The events that made up the 1976–77 snooker season were the first to award players with ranking points. Originally, the world rankings were decided based only on results in the World Snooker Championship, but other events were later added. The system used for the 2019–20 snooker season was first used in the 2010–11 season, where players won ranking points based entirely on prize money won from these events. The rankings are based on the prior two seasons, with ten revisions after specific tournaments throughout the season. These revisions are used as official rankings, with points awarded in the current season overwriting those from two years prior.

Ronnie O'Sullivan began the season as the highest ranked player; however, Judd Trump became world number one after winning the 2019 International Championship. Trump retained the position until the end of the season, where he had a lead of over 500,000 points, despite O'Sullivan winning 500,000 points at the 2020 World Snooker Championship. During the season, Trump took a record number of ranking events, winning six.

== Ranking list ==
=== Revision dates ===
Seedings for each event were based on the world rankings, with totals being updated at specific revision dates. On these dates, ranking points from the 2017–18 snooker season were removed from a player's total.

Revision dates
Revision point	Date	After	2017/2018 points dropped
1	29 July 2019	Riga Masters	Riga Masters
2	12 August 2019	International Championship	China Championship
3	30 September 2019	China Championship	Paul Hunter Classic; Indian Open; World Open
4	4 November 2019	World Open	European Masters; English Open; International Championship; Shanghai Masters
5	18 November 2019	Northern Ireland Open	Northern Ireland Open
6	9 December 2019	UK Championship	UK Championship
7	3 February 2020	German Masters	Scottish Open; German Masters
8	2 March 2020	Players Championship	World Grand Prix; Welsh Open; Shoot Out; Players Championship
9	27 June 2020 (Note: Because of the COVID-19 pandemic the Tour Championship and the World Championship were postponed. The final seedings revision was delayed until 27 June 2020, upon conclusion of the Tour Championship.)	Tour Championship	Gibraltar Open; China Open
10	17 August 2020	World Championship	World Championship

=== Seeding lists ===
The following table contains the rankings which were used to determine the seedings for following tournaments. Other provisional and unofficial rankings are produced after each ranking event which are not noted here. Peter Ebdon was ranked 51 before announcing his retirement during the season. Blank fields indicate that the player was not active on the tour, or had no ranking. The names are initially sorted by the scores at the end of the season.

Seeding list
Name	Revision 0		Revision 1		Revision 2		Revision 3		Revision 4		Revision 5	
Name	Pos	Points	Pos	Points	Pos	Points	Pos	Points	Pos	Points	Pos	Points
Judd Trump	2	1,166,500	2	1,166,500	1	1,334,500	1	1,347,500	1	1,324,000	1	1,394,000
Ronnie O'Sullivan	1	1,196,500	1	1,196,500	2	1,178,500	2	1,178,500	3	962,000	2	988,500
Neil Robertson	4	842,500	4	841,500	4	851,000	4	846,500	4	821,000	4	817,500
Mark Selby	6	752,225	6	756,225	6	781,225	5	807,500	6	714,500	6	724,500
Mark Allen	7	677,000	7	677,000	7	705,000	7	674,500	7	607,500	7	612,500
Kyren Wilson	8	561,225	8	559,225	8	567,725	9	498,500	9	494,500	9	502,000
John Higgins	5	795,500	5	795,500	5	802,000	6	753,000	5	722,000	5	738,500
Shaun Murphy	14	375,000	14	375,000	14	375,000	8	505,000	8	501,000	8	511,000
Stephen Maguire	16	346,000	16	321,000	15	317,500	14	316,000	14	300,500	14	305,500
Mark Williams	3	1,028,000	3	1,016,000	3	1,002,750	3	1,059,750	2	1,016,750	3	946,750
David Gilbert	12	394,000	12	393,000	12	399,500	12	390,500	10	421,000	11	415,000
Ding Junhui	10	403,500	10	403,500	9	418,000	18	272,750	16	279,750	16	279,750
Stuart Bingham	13	390,500	13	389,500	13	394,000	13	381,000	12	365,500	12	369,500
Jack Lisowski	11	398,600	11	398,600	11	403,350	11	404,250	13	360,250	13	357,750
Yan Bingtao	21	236,000	18	286,000	18	287,500	15	293,000	18	254,000	20	231,500
Joe Perry	19	282,000	19	279,000	17	288,500	16	292,500	15	290,500	15	304,500
Barry Hawkins	9	409,500	9	408,500	10	406,250	10	422,250	11	419,250	10	426,750
Gary Wilson	20	242,600	20	245,600	19	267,100	19	256,100	19	253,100	18	247,100
Ali Carter	17	308,000	17	310,000	16	291,500	17	291,500	17	274,000	17	275,500
Thepchaiya Un-Nooh	37	157,725	35	159,725	37	157,475	41	150,225	22	226,225	21	226,725
Graeme Dott	22	228,500	22	231,500	21	241,000	21	237,750	20	235,250	19	239,250
Anthony McGill	23	223,000	24	217,000	23	221,500	26	191,500	31	164,500	33	161,000
Scott Donaldson	35	161,500	34	163,500	31	172,000	29	176,750	28	176,750	26	180,750
Tom Ford	27	186,225	27	188,225	26	197,725	25	194,750	25	199,750	25	197,250
Zhou Yuelong	31	169,500	32	171,500	36	158,250	33	163,750	32	163,250	30	163,750
Matthew Selt	34	163,100	30	178,100	30	178,850	28	180,850	29	172,850	28	173,350
Kurt Maflin	49	124,700	45	137,700	44	139,200	37	154,600	41	136,600	42	134,100
Jimmy Robertson	24	222,725	23	221,725	22	226,225	22	212,225	24	204,225	23	203,600
Zhao Xintong	59	100,500	57	100,500	56	105,250	52	118,250	44	130,750	44	130,750
Michael Holt	44	136,000	43	139,000	43	139,750	45	131,500	37	145,500	37	145,000
Xiao Guodong	25	203,100	25	205,100	24	209,600	23	210,100	23	207,100	24	203,725
Noppon Saengkham	38	156,600	39	154,600	39	150,600	35	159,000	30	165,000	32	161,500
Matthew Stevens	43	139,000	44	138,000	45	130,750	44	133,250	43	130,750	43	131,250
Martin O'Donnell	42	146,100	42	146,100	42	146,100	42	146,250	39	139,750	38	142,750
Liang Wenbo	41	148,500	41	148,500	34	162,000	36	158,000	40	137,000	40	137,500
Mark King	28	178,725	28	183,725	28	184,475	32	168,500	35	154,000	36	150,500
Ryan Day	18	295,000	21	245,000	20	242,750	20	243,250	21	231,750	22	225,750
Luca Brecel	15	350,600	15	350,600	25	209,100	27	187,500	34	157,500	31	161,500
Mark Davis	33	163,725	36	159,725	38	156,225	38	154,225	36	149,725	35	152,725
Anthony Hamilton	62	93,500	60	95,500	62	88,500	61	91,250	58	97,250	54	107,250
Hossein Vafaei	40	151,500	40	151,500	41	147,500	31	169,500	33	161,500	34	159,000
Ben Woollaston	39	155,600	37	157,600	32	162,100	40	152,850	38	140,350	39	141,850
Lyu Haotian	26	190,500	26	193,500	27	193,500	24	198,250	26	192,750	29	172,750
Li Hang	29	176,000	29	182,000	40	150,000	43	137,500	42	134,500	41	135,000
Yuan Sijun	53	113,000	53	116,000	52	120,750	48	125,500	49	119,000	46	124,000
Ricky Walden	30	173,600	31	175,600	29	184,100	30	175,250	27	179,250	27	177,250
Stuart Carrington	50	120,500	51	125,500	50	126,250	49	125,250	47	125,750	45	127,250
Alan McManus	51	120,500	52	122,500	54	115,250	54	112,250	54	105,250	55	107,250
Robert Milkins	36	159,600	38	157,600	33	162,100	39	153,100	45	129,100	48	119,100
Marco Fu	55	110,500	55	110,500	58	103,500	59	101,250	57	97,250	56	100,250
Lu Ning	65	77,500	65	79,500	63	79,500	62	84,250	60	92,250	60	92,250
Sunny Akani	52	115,500	54	115,500	53	120,250	51	119,000	50	116,500	50	113,000
Martin Gould	32	169,000	33	169,000	35	161,750	34	162,250	51	110,250	53	110,250
Tian Pengfei	67	61,000	68	61,000	68	61,000	68	65,750	65	75,750	65	79,750
Mei Xiwen	69	54,000	69	58,000	69	58,000	70	58,000	67	73,000	66	76,000
Daniel Wells	58	100,500	56	103,500	55	108,000	57	103,750	56	100,250	57	100,250
Chris Wakelin	48	125,950	50	125,950	49	126,700	46	130,975	46	125,975	47	119,975
Sam Craigie	66	63,000	66	66,000	66	70,750	64	75,500	63	83,500	64	83,500
Andrew Higginson	57	100,600	61	94,600	57	104,100	58	102,250	59	92,250	58	96,250
Elliot Slessor	76	31,000	76	31,000	75	39,500	75	39,500	73	51,500	74	51,500
Luo Honghao	70	51,500	70	57,500	70	57,500	69	65,000	69	70,000	68	73,000
Joe O'Connor	68	60,000	67	62,000	67	62,000	66	66,750	70	69,750	69	72,750
Liam Highfield	61	94,600	58	97,600	59	102,350	60	96,500	55	101,000	59	95,000
Mark Joyce	54	111,000	47	130,000	48	127,750	47	128,250	52	108,250	51	112,250
Robbie Williams	60	99,600	59	95,600	60	100,350	56	104,500	62	84,000	61	91,500
Fergal O'Brien	63	89,200	63	89,200	65	71,200	67	66,600	68	71,600	67	75,600
Jak Jones	75	32,000	75	36,000	71	49,500	71	54,250	71	54,250	71	57,250
Ken Doherty	56	106,500	62	91,500	61	92,250	63	81,250	64	82,250	63	86,250
Jordan Brown	79	21,500	80	21,500	81	21,500	78	29,000	78	34,000	78	37,000
Michael Georgiou	46	130,600	48	129,600	51	125,600	50	120,600	48	120,600	49	118,100
Michael White	45	131,500	46	130,500	47	128,250	55	108,250	61	91,250	62	91,250
Zhang Anda	74	35,000	73	37,000	72	41,750	73	41,750	72	52,750	72	55,750
Sam Baird	71	40,000	72	40,000	74	40,000	72	44,750	75	44,750	75	47,750
Alfie Burden	77	29,000	77	29,000	77	29,000	77	29,000	77	40,000	76	40,000
Craig Steadman	72	38,500	71	40,500	73	40,500	74	40,500	74	48,500	73	51,500
Jamie Clarke	84	15,500	84	15,500	84	15,500	84	15,500	85	15,500	88	15,500
Ashley Carty	81	18,000	81	18,000	80	22,750	81	22,750	81	22,750	82	22,750
Ian Burns		0	127	0	127	0	127	0	105	5,000	101	8,000
Alexander Ursenbacher		0	106	2,000	109	2,000	95	6,750	102	6,750	85	16,750
John Astley	73	37,000	74	37,000	76	37,000	76	37,000	76	40,000	77	40,000
Mike Dunn	64	86,500	64	88,500	64	76,500	65	74,250	66	74,750	70	64,750
Louis Heathcote		0	98	2,000	92	6,750	93	6,750	93	10,750	95	10,750
Nigel Bond		0	122	0	97	4,750	99	4,750	94	9,750	98	9,750
David Grace		0	107	2,000	93	6,750	94	6,750	101	6,750	104	6,750
Lee Walker	80	21,000	79	23,000	79	23,000	80	23,000	79	33,000	79	33,000
Dominic Dale		0	124	0	124	0	100	4,750	87	13,750	89	13,750
Oliver Lines	78	26,000	78	28,000	78	28,000	79	28,000	80	28,000	80	28,000
Eden Sharav		0	120	0	121	0	123	0	125	0	121	0
Harvey Chandler	87	9,725	87	9,725	87	9,725	85	14,475	82	19,475	81	23,475
Jackson Page		0	102	2,000	105	2,000	108	2,000	100	7,000	97	10,000
Mitchell Mann		0	126	0	126	0	91	7,500	98	7,500	96	10,500
Gerard Greene		0	104	2,000	107	2,000	110	2,000	115	2,000	119	2,000
Kishan Hirani	88	8,600	89	8,600	89	8,600	87	13,350	90	13,350	91	13,350
Chen Feilong	86	10,500	86	10,500	86	10,500	89	10,500	89	13,500	86	16,500
James Wattana	82	17,500	82	17,500	82	17,500	82	17,500	83	17,500	84	17,500
Fan Zhengyi	92	5,500	92	5,500	95	5,500	97	5,500	96	9,500	99	9,500
Hammad Miah	89	7,725	90	7,725	90	7,725	88	12,475	86	15,475	83	18,475
Thor Chuan Leong	83	16,500	83	16,500	83	16,500	83	16,500	84	16,500	87	16,500
Zhang Jiankang	85	13,600	85	13,600	85	13,600	86	13,600	88	13,600	90	13,600
Barry Pinches		0	116	0	118	0	120	0	107	5,000	110	5,000
Kacper Filipiak		0	97	2,000	101	2,000	104	2,000	111	2,000	106	5,000
Si Jiahui		0	109	0	111	0	113	0	99	7,500	94	11,500
Chang Bingyu		0	96	2,000	91	6,750	92	6,750	92	11,750	93	11,750
Andy Lee	91	6,500	91	6,500	94	6,500	96	6,500	95	9,500	100	9,500
Chen Zifan		0	94	4,000	99	4,000	102	4,000	110	4,000	103	7,000
Soheil Vahedi		0	103	2,000	106	2,000	109	2,000	114	2,000	107	5,000
Rod Lawler		0	105	2,000	108	2,000	111	2,000	116	2,000	105	5,000
Igor Figueiredo		0	112	0	114	0	116	0	106	5,000	109	5,000
James Cahill		0	101	2,000	104	2,000	107	2,000	113	2,000	118	2,000
Xu Si		0	121	0	122	0	124	0	97	8,000	102	8,000
Jimmy White		0	118	0	119	0	121	0	123	0	122	0
Simon Lichtenberg	93	4,600	93	4,600	98	4,600	101	4,600	109	4,600	114	4,600
Adam Stefanow	90	7,500	88	9,500	88	9,500	90	9,500	91	12,750	92	12,500
Billy Joe Castle		0	119	0	120	0	122	0	124	0	115	4,000
Jamie O'Neill		0	99	2,000	102	2,000	105	2,000	112	2,000	108	5,000
Duane Jones		0	117	0	96	4,750	98	4,750	108	4,750	113	4,750
Peter Lines		0	125	0	125	0	126	0	127	0	124	0
David Lilley		0	113	0	115	0	117	0	120	0	116	3,000
Brandon Sargeant		0	100	2,000	103	2,000	106	2,000	104	5,000	112	5,000
Fraser Patrick		0	114	0	116	0	118	0	121	0	126	0
Bai Langning		0	95	2,000	100	2,000	103	2,000	103	5,000	111	5,000
Andy Hicks		0	115	0	117	0	119	0	122	0	123	0
Amine Amiri							128	0	128	0	127	0
Lei Peifan		0	110	0	112	0	114	0	118	0	117	3,000
Alex Borg		0	123	0	123	0	125	0	126	0	125	0
Riley Parsons		0	111	0	113	0	115	0	119	0	120	0
Steve Mifsud		0	108	0	110	0	112	0	117	0	128	0
Peter Ebdon	47	129,000	49	128,000	46	128,750	53	115,750	53	107,750	52	110,750

Seeding list
Name	Revision 6		Revision 7		Revision 8		Revision 9		Revision 10	
Name	Pos	Points	Pos	Points	Pos	Points	Pos	Points	Pos	Points
Judd Trump	1	1,396,000	1	1,446,000	1	1,551,000	1	1,641,000	1	1,648,500
Ronnie O'Sullivan	3	835,500	4	835,500	7	633,500	6	628,500	2	1,101,000
Neil Robertson	4	824,500	2	875,000	2	960,000	2	915,000	3	965,000
Mark Selby	6	736,500	5	811,500	4	804,000	7	622,000	4	722,000
Mark Allen	7	637,500	7	659,500	6	660,000	4	702,000	5	659,500
Kyren Wilson	8	498,500	8	506,000	8	535,500	8	506,500	6	621,500
John Higgins	5	748,000	6	745,500	5	695,500	5	684,500	7	534,500
Shaun Murphy	10	436,000	10	446,500	9	486,000	10	481,000	8	481,000
Stephen Maguire	15	350,500	15	346,500	15	351,500	9	496,500	9	478,500
Mark Williams	2	943,250	3	872,250	3	843,750	3	822,750	10	447,750
David Gilbert	12	410,000	12	426,000	11	421,000	12	410,000	11	401,000
Ding Junhui	9	479,750	9	480,250	10	430,250	11	412,250	12	399,750
Stuart Bingham	13	386,500	14	392,500	14	383,500	14	355,500	13	385,500
Jack Lisowski	14	364,750	13	393,750	13	387,750	13	360,750	14	333,250
Yan Bingtao	19	261,500	19	268,000	16	318,500	16	307,500	15	328,500
Joe Perry	16	294,000	17	298,000	17	316,000	17	304,000	16	276,500
Barry Hawkins	11	423,250	11	430,250	12	402,250	15	313,250	17	258,250
Gary Wilson	18	264,100	18	282,100	19	277,100	19	258,100	18	258,100
Ali Carter	17	287,500	16	308,500	18	303,500	18	298,500	19	256,000
Thepchaiya Un-Nooh	21	228,225	20	248,225	20	246,225	20	246,225	20	248,225
Graeme Dott	20	236,250	21	234,750	21	241,250	21	223,250	21	220,250
Anthony McGill	33	162,500	30	167,000	40	148,500	39	142,500	22	215,000
Scott Donaldson	26	177,250	22	200,750	24	208,250	23	200,250	23	206,250
Tom Ford	25	192,250	25	193,250	23	211,750	26	187,750	24	198,750
Zhou Yuelong	31	163,750	23	198,250	22	218,250	22	202,250	25	193,250
Matthew Selt	28	168,350	28	176,350	28	183,350	27	180,350	26	186,350
Kurt Maflin	42	141,100	42	148,100	42	146,100	43	140,100	27	181,100
Jimmy Robertson	22	200,225	24	198,225	25	197,225	24	197,225	28	179,225
Zhao Xintong	41	142,750	36	158,750	30	174,250	29	177,250	29	177,250
Michael Holt	40	146,500	40	149,000	26	196,000	25	188,000	30	174,500
Xiao Guodong	24	195,100	27	185,100	27	184,600	28	179,600	31	161,600
Noppon Saengkham	32	163,500	32	164,000	41	147,500	42	140,500	32	161,500
Matthew Stevens	34	155,750	35	159,750	32	164,750	31	158,750	33	160,750
Martin O'Donnell	35	154,750	33	160,750	34	157,250	33	153,250	34	159,250
Liang Wenbo	36	152,000	38	151,500	35	154,000	34	152,000	35	158,500
Mark King	43	140,000	43	144,000	44	138,500	46	128,500	36	148,500
Ryan Day	23	197,250	26	193,250	31	173,750	36	150,750	37	147,750
Luca Brecel	37	151,500	34	160,500	38	149,500	37	147,500	38	147,500
Mark Davis	29	164,725	31	165,725	33	161,225	32	156,225	39	142,725
Anthony Hamilton	50	119,250	50	118,250	48	123,750	48	117,750	40	137,750
Hossein Vafaei	38	149,000	39	149,000	39	149,000	35	151,000	41	137,500
Ben Woollaston	39	148,850	41	148,350	36	152,850	38	145,850	42	136,850
Lyu Haotian	30	164,250	29	168,250	29	176,250	30	162,250	43	134,750
Li Hang	44	137,000	44	142,500	45	138,500	40	141,500	44	132,500
Yuan Sijun	46	130,500	45	138,500	43	141,500	44	138,500	45	129,500
Ricky Walden	27	168,750	37	157,750	37	152,250	41	141,250	46	128,750
Stuart Carrington	45	133,750	46	134,250	46	132,750	45	131,750	47	128,750
Alan McManus	52	112,250	54	108,750	53	108,750	53	108,750	48	115,250
Robert Milkins	48	120,600	47	129,100	47	127,600	47	127,600	49	115,100
Marco Fu	55	102,250	52	111,250	50	111,250	50	111,250	50	111,250
Lu Ning	56	98,750	56	106,750	54	107,250	51	110,250	51	110,250
Sunny Akani	54	104,500	53	109,500	55	103,000	55	103,000	52	109,000
Martin Gould	59	94,250	57	100,250	61	88,250	60	86,250	53	107,250
Tian Pengfei	63	86,250	60	97,250	56	101,750	54	105,750	54	105,750
Mei Xiwen	65	82,500	63	88,500	58	95,500	56	97,500	55	97,500
Daniel Wells	53	106,750	55	107,250	52	109,250	52	110,250	56	96,750
Chris Wakelin	47	121,475	48	126,475	49	123,475	49	114,475	57	96,475
Sam Craigie	64	83,500	64	83,500	64	83,500	61	85,500	58	95,500
Andrew Higginson	61	91,250	61	96,250	59	94,250	58	91,250	59	92,750
Elliot Slessor	74	51,500	71	65,500	71	69,000	69	72,000	60	92,000
Luo Honghao	68	73,000	68	76,000	66	77,000	64	77,000	61	87,000
Joe O'Connor	69	72,750	67	76,750	67	76,750	65	76,750	62	86,750
Liam Highfield	58	96,500	62	96,000	60	93,000	59	88,000	63	85,000
Mark Joyce	62	89,750	65	81,250	68	76,750	67	74,750	64	84,750
Robbie Williams	60	93,000	58	100,000	57	99,500	57	93,500	65	84,500
Fergal O'Brien	67	75,600	69	75,600	69	75,100	70	68,100	66	83,100
Jak Jones	70	63,750	70	71,750	70	72,750	68	72,750	67	82,750
Ken Doherty	66	81,250	66	79,250	65	82,750	63	79,750	68	76,250
Jordan Brown	76	43,500	75	49,500	75	53,000	73	53,000	69	73,000
Michael Georgiou	49	119,600	49	125,600	63	83,600	62	81,600	70	72,600
Michael White	57	98,250	59	99,250	62	86,250	66	75,250	71	71,750
Zhang Anda	72	55,750	73	58,750	72	60,750	71	62,750	72	62,750
Sam Baird	75	47,750	76	47,750	77	47,750	76	47,750	73	62,750
Alfie Burden	77	40,000	77	47,000	76	50,000	74	52,000	74	62,000
Craig Steadman	73	51,500	74	51,500	74	53,500	72	55,500	75	55,500
Jamie Clarke	92	15,500	92	19,500	91	21,500	89	23,500	76	53,500
Ashley Carty	83	22,750	84	25,750	83	29,750	82	29,750	77	49,750
Ian Burns	84	20,000	82	30,000	81	34,000	81	34,000	78	49,000
Alexander Ursenbacher	88	16,750	85	23,750	85	27,250	86	27,250	79	47,250
John Astley	78	40,000	78	43,000	78	46,000	77	46,000	80	46,000
Mike Dunn	71	59,750	72	59,250	73	54,250	75	49,250	81	45,750
Louis Heathcote	87	17,250	90	20,250	89	23,250	87	25,250	82	40,250
Nigel Bond	79	34,250	79	39,250	79	39,750	78	39,750	83	39,750
David Grace	96	13,250	86	23,250	88	23,250	84	28,250	84	38,250
Lee Walker	80	33,000	80	36,000	80	36,000	79	38,000	85	38,000
Dominic Dale	93	13,750	91	19,750	84	27,750	85	27,750	86	37,750
Oliver Lines	81	28,000	81	31,000	82	31,000	80	34,000	87	34,000
Eden Sharav	98	12,000	99	15,000	103	15,000	104	15,000	88	30,000
Harvey Chandler	82	23,475	83	26,475	86	26,475	83	29,475	89	29,475
Jackson Page	102	10,000	98	16,000	101	16,000	96	18,000	90	28,000
Mitchell Mann	101	10,500	93	18,500	90	21,500	90	21,500	91	26,500
Gerard Greene	120	2,000	108	9,000	100	16,500	100	16,500	92	26,500
Kishan Hirani	95	13,350	89	20,350	93	20,350	92	20,350	93	25,350
Chen Feilong	89	16,500	95	16,500	94	20,000	93	20,000	94	25,000
James Wattana	86	17,500	87	21,500	87	24,500	88	24,500	95	24,500
Fan Zhengyi	91	16,000	97	16,000	95	19,000	94	19,000	96	24,000
Hammad Miah	85	18,475	94	18,475	96	18,475	95	18,475	97	23,475
Thor Chuan Leong	90	16,500	96	16,500	98	17,000	99	17,000	98	22,000
Zhang Jiankang	94	13,600	88	21,100	92	21,100	91	21,100	99	21,100
Barry Pinches	112	5,000	111	8,000	114	8,000	111	10,000	100	20,000
Kacper Filipiak	108	5,000	103	14,000	105	14,000	107	14,000	101	19,000
Si Jiahui	100	11,500	101	14,500	97	17,500	97	17,500	102	17,500
Chang Bingyu	99	11,750	100	14,750	102	15,250	98	17,250	103	17,250
Andy Lee	103	9,500	105	12,500	99	16,500	101	16,500	104	16,500
Chen Zifan	106	7,000	107	10,000	107	13,000	102	16,000	105	16,000
Soheil Vahedi	109	5,000	115	5,000	106	13,500	103	15,500	106	15,500
Rod Lawler	107	5,000	109	8,000	113	8,000	112	10,000	107	15,000
Igor Figueiredo	111	5,000	110	8,000	109	12,500	105	14,500	108	14,500
James Cahill	104	8,500	102	14,500	104	14,500	106	14,500	109	14,500
Xu Si	105	8,000	106	11,000	111	11,000	108	13,000	110	13,000
Jimmy White	122	0	121	3,000	123	3,000	122	3,000	111	13,000
Simon Lichtenberg	116	4,600	119	4,600	116	7,600	116	7,600	112	12,600
Adam Stefanow	97	12,500	104	12,500	108	12,500	109	12,500	113	12,500
Billy Joe Castle	117	4,000	113	7,000	110	12,000	110	12,000	114	12,000
Jamie O'Neill	110	5,000	116	5,000	118	5,000	117	7,000	115	12,000
Duane Jones	115	4,750	118	4,750	120	4,750	118	6,750	116	11,750
Peter Lines	124	0	123	3,000	119	5,000	120	5,000	117	10,000
David Lilley	118	3,000	114	7,000	117	7,500	113	9,500	118	9,500
Brandon Sargeant	114	5,000	117	5,000	112	9,000	114	9,000	119	9,000
Fraser Patrick	126	0	124	3,000	122	3,500	121	3,500	120	8,500
Bai Langning	113	5,000	112	8,000	115	8,000	115	8,000	121	8,000
Andy Hicks	123	0	122	3,000	124	3,000	123	3,000	122	8,000
Amine Amiri	127	0	127	0	127	0	124	2,000	123	7,000
Lei Peifan	119	3,000	120	3,000	121	4,000	119	6,000	124	6,000
Alex Borg	125	0	126	0	126	0	126	0	125	5,000
Riley Parsons	121	0	125	0	125	0	125	0	126	0
Steve Mifsud	128	0	128	0	128	0	127	0	127	0
Peter Ebdon	51	112,250	51	113,750	51	109,750				

== Ranking points ==
Preceded by 2018/2019	2019/2020 points	Succeeded by 2020/2021

Below is a list of points awarded to each player for the events they participated in. Blank fields indicate that the player did not participate at the event.

Rank	Player	18/19 season	Tournament																	Season	Total
Rank	Player	18/19 season	RM	IC	CC	ENO	WO	NIO	UK	SCO	EUM	GM	WGP	WEO	SSO	PC	GO	TC	WC	19/20	Total
1	Judd Trump	852000		175000	13000	4000	150000	70000	12000	10000	0	80000	7500	10000		125000	50000	40000	50000	796500	1648500
2	Ronnie O'Sullivan	503500				7500	0	30000	17000	10000			12500	20000	500				500000	597500	1101000
3	Neil Robertson	640500	0	13500	7500	4000	0	0	17000	7500	80000	35000	100000	10000		0	0	0	50000	324500	965000
4	Mark Selby	296500	4000	32000	32000	70000	13500	10000	17000	70000	6000	3000	0	10000	0	15000	3000	40000	100000	425500	722000
5	Mark Allen	434000		32000	7500	20000	13500	7500	40000	20000	3000	3000	0	4000	0	15000	0	60000	0	225500	659500
6	Kyren Wilson	271500	2000	8500	7500	4000	32500	7500	6500	4000	4000	3000	20000	30000	500	0	20000		200000	350000	621500
7	John Higgins	346000		13500	13000		32500	20000	24500	7500	6000	4000	12500	10000		15000	0	0	30000	188500	534500
8	Shaun Murphy	98000	0	75000	150000	7500	8000	10000	0	7500	3000	20000	0	70000	2000	30000		0	0	383000	481000
9	Stephen Maguire	176500	0	8500	7500	0	5000	7500	80000	3000	0	3000	0	7500		30000	0	150000	0	302000	478500
10	Mark Williams	278500	3000	4750	75000	3000			6500		4000	5000	7500	4000	500	0	6000		50000	169250	447750
11	David Gilbert	297000	0	13500	20000	30000	20000	0	0	20000	0	0	0	0	500	0	0		0	104000	401000
12	Ding Junhui	108500		21500	4750	0	13500	0	200000	4000	6000	4000	0	7500		0			30000	291250	399750
13	Stuart Bingham	290000	0	8500	0	3000	20000	4000	17000	0	3000	3000	0	4000	0		3000		30000	95500	385500
14	Jack Lisowski	246500	4000	4750	7500	4000	13500	0	12000	30000	3000	0	0	4000	1000		3000		0	86750	333250
15	Yan Bingtao	92000	50000	8500	7500	0	5000	7500	40000	3000	4000	3000	0	20000	8000	50000	0	0	30000	236500	328500
16	Joe Perry	146500	3000	13500	20000	4000	13500	20000	12000	7500	0	4000	12500	0	2000	15000	3000		0	130000	276500
17	Barry Hawkins	157000	0	4750	20000	7500	8000	7500	6500	0	11000	0	0	3000	1000		2000		30000	101250	258250
18	Gary Wilson	167100	4000	21500	0	7500	0	0	17000	3000	17500	5000	12500	3000	0		0		0	91000	258100
19	Ali Carter	184000	2000	13500	0	0	13500	4000	12000	3000	17500	3000	0	3000	500		0		0	72000	256000
20	Thepchaiya Un-Nooh	92225	4000	4750	4750	7500	75000	4000	6500	10000	11000	3000	0	0	500	0	5000		20000	156000	248225
21	Graeme Dott	69000	3000	21500	4750	4000	13500	4000	12000	7500	6000	20000	40000	0		0	0		15000	151250	220250
22	Anthony McGill	58500	0	8500	13000	0	8000	0	6500	3000	0	4000		7500	4000		2000		100000	156500	215000
23	Scott Donaldson	126000	2000	8500	4750	0	0	4000	6500	10000	11000	5000	7500	3000	0		3000		15000	80250	206250
24	Tom Ford	91500	3000	21500	4750	20000	0	0	0	4000	3000	4000	20000	3000	0		4000		20000	107250	198750
25	Zhou Yuelong	91000	3000	4750	7500	4000	20000	3000	0	0	35000	3000	0	0	20000		2000			102250	193250
26	Matthew Selt	106100	15000	4750	13000	4000	5000	3000	0	0	3000	10000	7500	0	0		0		15000	80250	186350
27	Kurt Maflin	59100	15000	8500	20000	4000	0	0	17000	4000	3000	0	0	0	500		0		50000	122000	181100
28	Jimmy Robertson	130725	0	8500	0	3000	8000	3000	6500	7500	0	3000		4000	0		5000		0	48500	179225
29	Zhao Xintong	100500	0	4750	13000	7500	5000	0	12000	0	6000	10000	7500	7500	500		3000			76750	177250
30	Michael Holt	69500	3000	4750	4750	4000	20000	3000	6500	0	6000	0	0	0	50000	0	3000		0	105000	174500
31	Xiao Guodong	92100	3000	8500	7500	7500	8000	0	6500	4000	6000	0	7500	4000	1000		6000			69500	161600
32	Noppon Saengkham	90500	0	0	13000	0	8000	0	12000	0	0	4000		4000	0		0		30000	71000	161500
33	Matthew Stevens	78000		4750	7500	0	5000	3000	24500	3000	0	3000	7500	4000	500				20000	82750	160750
34	Martin O'Donnell	100000	0	0	4750	3000	8000	3000	12000	3000	3000	0		4000	500		3000		15000	59250	159250
35	Liang Wenbo	69000		13500	0	0	8000	3000	24500	0	4000	3000	7500	0	1000		5000		20000	89500	158500
36	Mark King	93000	6000	4750	4750	0	0	0	12000	3000	0	3000		0			2000		20000	55500	148500
37	Ryan Day	102500	0	4750	7500	3000	0	0	6500	3000	3000	0		0	500		2000		15000	45250	147750
38	Luca Brecel	95500	2000	8500	13000	0	5000	4000	0	0	4000	5000		7500	0		3000		0	52000	147500
39	Mark Davis	101725	0	8500	0	0	8000	3000	12000	3000	0	3000		3000	500		0		0	41000	142725
40	Anthony Hamilton	70000	2000	0	4750	3000	5000	10000	12000	0	0	3000		4000	4000		0		20000	67750	137750
41	Hossein Vafaei	89500	2000	0	32000	4000	8000	0	0	0	0	0		0	0		2000		0	48000	137500
42	Ben Woollaston	78600	3000	8500	4750	3000	5000	4000	12000	3000	3000	0		4000	4000		4000		0	58250	136850
43	Lyu Haotian	96500	3000	0	4750	0	5000	0	6500	0	4000	0		3000	8000		4000		0	38250	134750
44	Li Hang	77000	6000	0	7500	3000	5000	3000	17000	3000	3000	3000	0	0	1000		4000			55500	132500
45	Yuan Sijun	85000	3000	4750	4750	3000	0	7500	6500	3000	3000	4000		3000	0		2000			44500	129500
46	Ricky Walden	66000	2000	8500	4750	10000	5000	4000	6500	4000	0	0		3000	0		0		15000	62750	128750
47	Stuart Carrington	75500	6000	4750	0	0	8000	4000	6500	3000		3000		3000	0				15000	53250	128750
48	Alan McManus	64500	3000	4750	0	3000	5000	0	12000	3000	0	0		0	0				20000	50750	115250
49	Robert Milkins	70100	0	8500	0	0	0	0	6500	3000	4000	4000		4000	0		0		15000	45000	115100
50	Marco Fu	68500			4750	3000	5000	3000	12000	4000	11000	0		0						42750	111250
51	Lu Ning	77500	2000	0	4750	3000	5000	0	6500	4000	4000	0		0	500		3000		0	32750	110250
52	Sunny Akani	55500		4750	4750	3000	13500	0	6500	0	0	5000		0	1000				15000	53500	109000
53	Martin Gould	45500	0	4750	7500	0		0	6500	4000	3000	3000		0	0		3000		30000	61750	107250
54	Tian Pengfei	61000	0	0	4750	10000	0	4000	6500	3000	4000	4000		4000	500		4000		0	44750	105750
55	Mei Xiwen	54000	4000	0	0	10000	5000	3000	6500	3000	3000	0		3000	4000		2000			43500	97500
56	Daniel Wells	60500	3000	8500	4750	3000	0	0	6500	0	4000	0		4000	500		2000		0	36250	96750
57	Chris Wakelin	59225	0	4750	13000	3000	0	0	6500	7500	0	0		0	500		2000		0	37250	96475
58	Sam Craigie	63000	3000	4750	4750	3000	5000	0	0	0	0	0		0	0		2000		10000	32500	95500
59	Andrew Higginson	46000	0	13500	4750	0	0	4000	0	4000	0	3000		0	500		2000		15000	46750	92750
60	Elliot Slessor	31000	0	8500	0	4000	8000	0	0	4000	0	10000		3000	500		3000		20000	61000	92000
61	Luo Honghao	51500	6000	0	7500	0	5000	3000	0	0	3000	0		0	1000		0		10000	35500	87000
62	Joe O'Connor	60000	2000	0	4750	3000	0	3000	0	4000	0	0		0	0		0		10000	26750	86750
63	Liam Highfield	35500	3000	4750	4750	3000	5000	0	6500	4000	0	0		3000	500		0		15000	49500	85000
64	Mark Joyce	27500	25000	4750	7500	0	0	4000	0	0	0	0		3000	0		3000		10000	57250	84750
65	Robbie Williams	41000	0	4750	4750	3000	5000	7500	6500	0	4000	5000		3000			0		0	43500	84500
66	Fergal O'Brien	44100	0	0	0	4000	8000	4000	0	0	4000	0		0	0		4000		15000	39000	83100
67	Jak Jones	32000	4000	13500	4750	0	0	3000	6500	0	4000	4000		0	1000		0		10000	50750	82750
68	Ken Doherty	45500		4750	0	0	5000	7500	0	0	0	0		3000	500		0		10000	30750	76250
69	Jordan Brown	21500	0	0	7500	0	5000	3000	6500	0	3000	3000		3000	500		0		20000	51500	73000
70	Michael Georgiou	48100	0	0	0	3000	5000	0	6500	0	0	10000		0	0		0		0	24500	72600
71	Michael White	33000	0	4750	0	0	0	0	17000	0	4000	3000		0	0		0		10000	38750	71750
72	Zhang Anda	35000	2000	4750	0	3000	8000	3000	0	0	0	3000		0	2000		2000			27750	62750
73	Sam Baird	40000	0	0	4750	0	0	3000	0	0	0	0		0	0		0		15000	22750	62750
74	Alfie Burden	29000	0	0	0	3000	8000	0	0	3000	4000	0		3000	0		2000		10000	33000	62000
75	Craig Steadman	38500	2000	0	0	0	8000	3000	0	0	0	0		0	2000		2000		0	17000	55500
76	Jamie Clarke	15500	0	0	0	0	0	0	0	0	0	4000		0	2000		2000		30000	38000	53500
77	Ashley Carty	18000	0	4750	0	0	0	0	0	0	0	3000		3000	1000		0		20000	31750	49750
78	Ian Burns	0	0	0	0	0	5000	3000	12000	3000	3000	4000		3000	1000		0		15000	49000	49000
79	Alexander Ursenbacher	0	2000	0	4750	0	0	10000	0	3000	0	4000		3000	500				20000	47250	47250
80	John Astley	37000	0	0	0	3000	0	0	0	3000	0	0		3000	0		0		0	9000	46000
81	Mike Dunn	20000	2000	0	4750	3000	0	0	0	4000	0	0		0	2000		0		10000	25750	45750
82	Louis Heathcote	0	2000	4750	0	4000	0	0	6500	3000	0	0		3000	0		2000		15000	40250	40250
83	Nigel Bond	0		4750	0	0	5000	0	24500	0	0	5000		0	500		0		0	39750	39750
84	David Grace	0	2000	4750	0	0	0	0	6500	3000	3000	4000		0	0		5000		10000	38250	38250
85	Lee Walker	21000	2000	0	0	10000	0	0	0	0	3000	0		0	0		2000		0	17000	38000
86	Dominic Dale	0	0	0	4750	4000	5000	0	0	0	3000	3000		7500	500		0		10000	37750	37750
87	Oliver Lines	26000	2000	0	0	0	0	0	0	0	0	3000		0	0		3000		0	8000	34000
88	Eden Sharav	0	0	0	0	0	0	0	12000	0	3000	0		0	0		0		15000	30000	30000
89	Harvey Chandler	9725	0	0	4750	0	5000	4000	0	0	0	3000		0	0		3000		0	19750	29475
90	Jackson Page	0	2000	0	0	0	5000	3000	0	0	6000	0		0	0		2000		10000	28000	28000
91	Mitchell Mann	0	0	0	7500	0	0	3000	0	0	3000	5000		3000	0		0		5000	26500	26500
92	Gerard Greene	0	2000	0	0	0	0	0	0	0	3000	4000		7500	0		0		10000	26500	26500
93	Kishan Hirani	8600	0	0	4750	0	0	0	0	3000	0	4000		0	0		0		5000	16750	25350
94	Chen Feilong	10500	0	0	0	3000	0	3000	0	0	0	0		3000	500		0		5000	14500	25000
95	James Wattana	17500			0	0	0	0	0	4000				3000						7000	24500
96	Fan Zhengyi	5500	0	0	0	4000	0	0	6500	0	0	0		3000	0		0		5000	18500	24000
97	Hammad Miah	7725	0	0	4750	3000	0	3000	0	0	0	0		0	0		0		5000	15750	23475
98	Thor Chuan Leong	16500	0	0	0	0	0	0	0	0	0	0		0	500		0		5000	5500	22000
99	Zhang Jiankang	13600	0	0	0	0	0	0	0	7500	0	0		0	0		0			7500	21100
100	Barry Pinches	0	0	0	0	0	5000	0	0	0	0	3000		0	0		2000		10000	20000	20000
101	Kacper Filipiak	0	2000	0	0	0	0	3000	0	3000	3000	3000		0	0		0		5000	19000	19000
102	Si Jiahui	0	0	0	0	7500	0	4000	0	3000	0	0		3000	0		0		0	17500	17500
103	Chang Bingyu	0	2000	4750	0	0	5000	0	0	3000	0	0		0	500		2000			17250	17250
104	Andy Lee	6500	0	0	0	3000	0	0	0	3000	0	0		4000	0		0			10000	16500
105	Chen Zifan	0	4000	0	0	0	0	3000	0	0	3000	0		3000	0		3000			16000	16000
106	Soheil Vahedi	0	2000	0	0	0	0	3000	0	0	0	0		7500	1000		2000		0	15500	15500
107	Rod Lawler	0	2000	0	0	0	0	3000	0	0	3000	0		0	0		2000		5000	15000	15000
108	Igor Figueiredo	0			0	0	5000	0	0	0	0	3000		4000	500		2000		0	14500	14500
109	James Cahill	0	2000	0	0	0	0	0	6500	3000	3000	0		0	0		0		0	14500	14500
110	Xu Si	0	0	0	0	3000	5000	0	0	0	0	3000		0	0		2000			13000	13000
111	Jimmy White	0	0	0	0	0	0	0	0	0	3000	0		0	0		0		10000	13000	13000
112	Simon Lichtenberg	4600	0	0	0	0	0	0	0	0	0	0		3000	0		0		5000	8000	12600
113	Adam Stefanow	7500	2000	0	0	3000	0	0	0	0	0	0		0	0		0		0	5000	12500
114	Billy Joe Castle	0	0	0	0	0	0	4000	0	3000	0	0		3000	2000		0		0	12000	12000
115	Jamie O'Neill	0	2000	0	0	0	0	3000	0	0	0	0		0	0		2000		5000	12000	12000
116	Duane Jones	0	0	4750	0	0	0	0	0	0	0	0		0	0		2000		5000	11750	11750
117	Peter Lines	0	0	0	0	0	0	0	0	3000	0	0		0	2000		0		5000	10000	10000
118	David Lilley	0	0	0	0	0	0	3000	0	0	4000	0		0	500		2000		0	9500	9500
119	Brandon Sargeant	0	2000	0	0	3000	0	0	0	0	0	0		3000	1000		0		0	9000	9000
120	Fraser Patrick	0	0	0	0	0	0	0	0	0	3000	0		0	500		0		5000	8500	8500
121	Bai Langning	0	2000	0	0	3000	0	0	0	0	0	3000		0	0		0			8000	8000
122	Andy Hicks	0	0	0	0	0	0	0	0	0	3000	0		0	0		0		5000	8000	8000
123	Amine Amiri	0				0			0	0				0	0		2000		5000	7000	7000
124	Lei Peifan	0	0	0	0	0	0	3000	0	0	0	0		0	1000		2000			6000	6000
125	Alex Borg	0	0	0	0	0	0	0	0	0	0	0		0	0		0		5000	5000	5000
126	Riley Parsons	0	0	0	0	0	0	0	0	0	0	0		0	0		0		0	0	0
127	Steve Mifsud	0			0																
