= 2019 International Championship =

Snooker tournament, held in China

Tournament information
- Dates: 4–11 August 2019
- Venue: Baihu Media Broadcasting Centre
- City: Daqing
- Country: China
- Organisation: World Snooker
- Format: Ranking event
- Total prize fund: £802,000
- Winner's share: £175,000
- Highest break: Tom Ford (ENG) (147)

Final
- Champion: Judd Trump (ENG)
- Runner-up: Shaun Murphy (ENG)
- Score: 10–3

The 2019 International Championship was a professional snooker tournament that took place from 4 to 11 August 2019 at the Baihu Media Broadcasting Centre in Daqing, China. It was the second ranking event of the 2019/2020 season and the eighth iteration of the International Championship first held in 2012.

Northern Irish cueist Mark Allen was the defending champion, after defeating Australian Neil Robertson in the previous year's final. Allen, however, lost 9–6 to England's Shaun Murphy in the semi-finals. Reigning world champion Judd Trump won the event and his 12th ranking championship with a 10–3 win over Murphy in the final. In winning the event, Trump returned to the world number one position, that he had last held in 2013.

Trump and Allen tied for the highest break during the televised stages, both scoring 141, with Trump also making 12 centuries throughout the tournament. Qualifying for the event took place 14–17 June 2019 in Ponds Forge International Sports Centre in Sheffield, England. Tom Ford made the highest break of qualifying, with a maximum break, the fourth of his career, in his 6–1 win in qualifying over Fraser Patrick.

== Format ==
The event was the eighth iteration of the International Championship, having been first held in 2012. The event took place from 4–11 August 2019 at the Baihu Media Broadcasting Centre in Daqing, China. The event was the second ranking tournament of the 2019/20 snooker season after the 2019 Riga Masters won by Yan Bingtao.

Qualifying for the event was held from 14 to 17 June 2019 at the Ponds Forge International Sports Centre in Sheffield, England, featuring one first round match. Matches were played as best-of-11-frames until the semi-finals, which were played as best-of-17-frames, whilst the final was played as a best-of-19-frames.

=== Prize fund ===
The championship total fund was higher than that of the previous year's event, with a total of £802,000 (up from £775,000). The winner of the event received the same prize money as in previous years, at £175,000. The breakdown of prize money for this year is shown below:

- Winner: £175,000
- Runner-up: £75,000
- Semi-final: £32,000
- Quarter-final: £21,500
- Last 16: £13,500
- Last 32: £8,500
- Last 64: £4,750
- Highest break: £6,000
- Total: £802,000

== Tournament summary ==
The championship began on 4 August 2019, with the first round alongside held over qualifier matches. Two matches in the heldover qualifier rounds were decided on a deciding frame. Ding Junhui defeated Simon Lichtenberg despite being 5–3 behind, whilst four-time world champion John Higgins defeated amateur under 21 world champion Wu Yize despite being 4–3 behind to the 15 year old. Judd Trump in his first tournament after winning the 2019 World Snooker Championship scored three century breaks in his qualifier to defeat Jordan Brown 6–1.

=== Early rounds (first round–quarter-finals) ===
Two top-16 ranked players were defeated in first round; Mark Williams lost to Jak Jones and Barry Hawkins to Daniel Wells both 6–2. Ding Junhui defeated three fellow Chinese players in the first three rounds, overcoming Zhao Xintong, Xiao Guodong and Liang Wenbo to reach the quarter-finals. Defending champion Mark Allen conceded just four frames to draw Ding, having defeated Sam Craigie, Mark Davis (both 6–1) and Ali Carter (6–2). Allen defeated Ding 6–3 to reach the semi-finals.

Graeme Dott qualified to play Shaun Murphy in the second quarter-final. Dott defeated Michael White before defeating two world champions in Stuart Bingham and John Higgins to reach the quarter-final. Murphy, who had reached only the Scottish Open final in the previous season defeated Yuan Sijun 6–5 and Riga Masters champion Yan Bingtao 6–4 before drawing a rematch of the second round match at the 2019 World Championships against Neil Robertson. Murphy defeated Robertson on a deciding frame 6–5. Murphy defeated Dott 6–4 to draw Allen in the semi-final.

Three-time world champion Mark Selby reached the second semi-final, after defeating Liam Highfield and Ben Woollaston (both 6–3), before playing World Championship semi-finalists David Gilbert and Gary Wilson, defeating both on a deciding frame 6–5. World champion Judd Trump reached the semi-finals defeating Zhang Anda, Scott Donaldson, Joe Perry and Tom Ford.

=== Semi-final–final ===
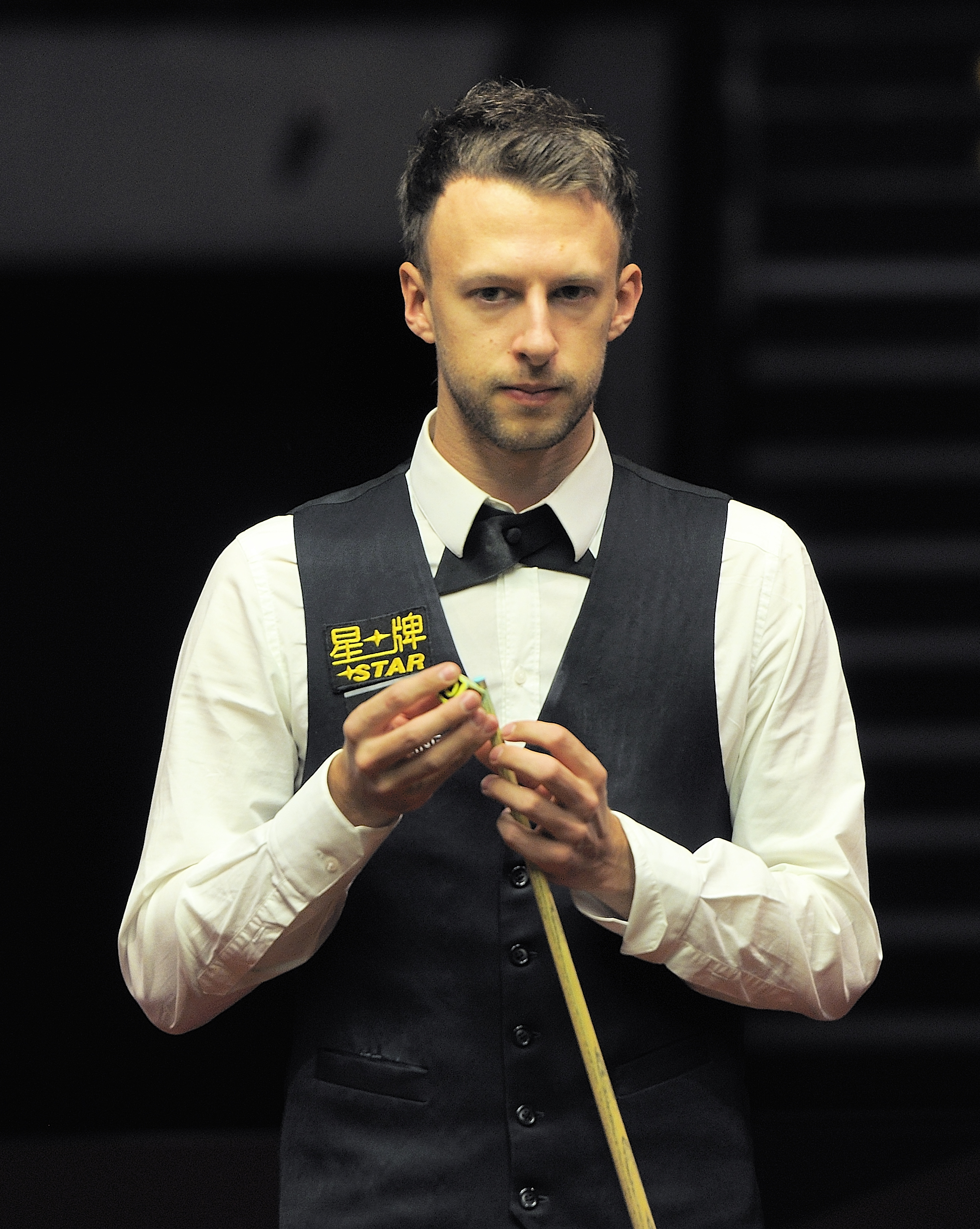
Reigning world champion Judd Trump won the event, defeating Shaun Murphy 10–3 in the final.

The first semi-final took place on 9 August 2019, between Selby and Trump. In reaching the semi-finals, Trump was guaranteed to return to world number one after the tournament for the first time since 2013. Selby won three of the first four frames to lead 3–1. However, Trump won the next four frames to lead 5–3 after the first session with breaks of 97, 108, 97 and 116. In the second session, Trump won the first three frames to lead 8–3 including two more 90+ breaks. Selby took frame 12 before Trump won the match in frame 13 with a break of 72. After the match, Trump commented "It was probably somewhere near how I was playing to win the World Championship," describing his form within the match.

The second semi-final was a rematch of the 2019 Scottish Masters final between Murphy and Allen. Murphy won the first five frames of the match, with Allen not scoring a single point until frame four. Allen fought back to trail 3–6 after the first session. Murphy won the first frame of the second session, before Allen won the next two. Murphy won frame 13 to need just one more frame for victory. Allen won the next two frames to push the match into the interval. Murphy however won frame 15 to win the match 9–6 with a break of 66.

The final was played as a best-of-19-frames match held over two sessions on 11 August 2019, refereed by Lyu Xilin. Trump won the first five frames of the match making a century break in frame three. Murphy, however won three of the remaining four frames of the session to trail 3–6. On the resume of the match, Trump dominated the remaining frames, winning the next four frames to win the match 10–3, completing eight half-centuries in the match. The victory was Trump's twelfth ranking event title, twelfth match unbeaten in a row, and had scored twelve centuries during the event.

The win was the first time a reigning world champion won the first championship in which they had competed in after the event, since Ronnie O'Sullivan in 2008. In losing the event, Murphy commented that he was "disappointed" and that had not played well: "Judd swamped me, that was how it felt."

== Main draw ==
Players in bold denote match winners.

**First round** Best of 11 frames
**Mark Allen (NIR)**	**6**
Sam Craigie (ENG)	1
**Mark Davis (ENG)**	**6**
Matthew Selt (ENG)	3
**Ali Carter (ENG)**	**6**
Alan McManus (SCO)	5
Ryan Day (WAL)	4
**Kurt Maflin (NOR)**	**6**
Ashley Carty (ENG)	5
**Xiao Guodong (CHN)**	**6**
Zhao Xintong (CHN)	4
**Ding Junhui (CHN)**	**6**
**Liang Wenbo (CHN)**	**6**
Duane Jones (WAL)	5
**Daniel Wells (WAL)**	**6**
Barry Hawkins (ENG)	2
**John Higgins (SCO)**	**6**
David Grace (ENG)	4
**Elliot Slessor (ENG)**	**6**
Louis Heathcote (ENG)	4
**Stuart Bingham (ENG)**	**6**
Mark Joyce (ENG)	1
**Graeme Dott (SCO)**	**6**
Michael White (WAL)	1
Chang Bingyu (CHN)	3
**Yan Bingtao (CHN)**	**6**
Yuan Sijun (CHN)	5
**Shaun Murphy (ENG)**	**6**
Thepchaiya Un-Nooh (THA)	2
**Ricky Walden (ENG)**	**6**
Nigel Bond (ENG)	2
**Neil Robertson (AUS)**	**6**
Mark Williams (WAL)	2
**Jak Jones (WAL)**	**6**
Zhou Yuelong (CHN)	3
**Robert Milkins (ENG)**	**6**
**Luca Brecel (BEL)**	**6**
Sunny Akani (THA)	3
**Gary Wilson (ENG)**	**6**
Peter Ebdon (ENG)	1
Michael Holt (ENG)	3
**Anthony McGill (SCO)**	**6**
Ken Doherty (IRL)	2
**David Gilbert (ENG)**	**6**
**Ben Woollaston (ENG)**	**6**
Mark King (ENG)	3
Liam Highfield (ENG)	3
**Mark Selby (ENG)**	**6**
**Kyren Wilson (ENG)**	**6**
Robbie Williams (ENG)	2
Tom Ford (ENG)	**w/o**
Hossein Vafaei (IRN)	w/d
Jack Lisowski (ENG)	5
**Andrew Higginson (ENG)**	**6**
**Jimmy Robertson (ENG)**	**6**
Matthew Stevens (WAL)	4
Chris Wakelin (ENG)	2
**Joe Perry (ENG)**	**6**
Stuart Carrington (ENG)	0
**Stephen Maguire (SCO)**	**6**
**Scott Donaldson (SCO)**	**6**
Martin Gould (ENG)	4
Zhang Anda (CHN)	2
**Judd Trump (ENG)**	**6**

**Second round** Best of 11 frames
**(Northern Ireland) Mark Allen**	**6**
(England) Mark Davis	1
**(England) Ali Carter**	**6**
(Norway) Kurt Maflin	3
(China) Xiao Guodong	1
**(China) Ding Junhui**	**6**
**(China) Liang Wenbo**	**6**
(Wales) Daniel Wells	4
**(Scotland) John Higgins**	**6**
(England) Elliot Slessor	3
(England) Stuart Bingham	3
**(Scotland) Graeme Dott**	**6**
(China) Yan Bingtao	4
**(England) Shaun Murphy**	**6**
(England) Ricky Walden	5
**(Australia) Neil Robertson**	**6**
**(Wales) Jak Jones**	**6**
(England) Robert Milkins	3
(Belgium) Luca Brecel	2
**(England) Gary Wilson**	**6**
(Scotland) Anthony McGill	1
**(England) David Gilbert**	**6**
(England) Ben Woollaston	3
**(England) Mark Selby**	**6**
(England) Kyren Wilson	5
**(England) Tom Ford**	**6**
**(England) Andrew Higginson**	**6**
(England) Jimmy Robertson	4
**(England) Joe Perry**	**6**
(Scotland) Stephen Maguire	2
(Scotland) Scott Donaldson	4
**(England) Judd Trump**	**6**

**Third round** Best of 11 frames
**(Northern Ireland) Mark Allen**	**6**
(England) Ali Carter	2
**(China) Ding Junhui**	**6**
(China) Liang Wenbo	5
(Scotland) John Higgins	2
**(Scotland) Graeme Dott**	**6**
**(England) Shaun Murphy**	**6**
(Australia) Neil Robertson	5
(Wales) Jak Jones	3
**(England) Gary Wilson**	**6**
(England) David Gilbert	5
**(England) Mark Selby**	**6**
**(England) Tom Ford**	**6**
(England) Andrew Higginson	4
(England) Joe Perry	2
**(England) Judd Trump**	**6**

**Quarter-finals**; Best of 11 frames
**(Northern Ireland) Mark Allen**	**6**
(China) Ding Junhui	3
(Scotland) Graeme Dott	4
**(England) Shaun Murphy**	**6**
(England) Gary Wilson	5
**(England) Mark Selby**	**6**
(England) Tom Ford	3
**(England) Judd Trump**	**6**

**Semi-finals**; Best of 17 frames
(Northern Ireland) Mark Allen	6
**(England) Shaun Murphy**	**9**
(England) Mark Selby	4
**(England) Judd Trump**	**9**

**Final**; Best of 19 frames
(England) Shaun Murphy	3
**(England) Judd Trump**	**10**

=== Final ===
Final: Best of 19 frames. Referee: Lyu Xilin. Baihu Media Broadcasting Centre, Daqing, China, 11 August 2019.
Shaun Murphy; England	3–**10**	**Judd Trump**; England
Afternoon: 14–**85**, 5–**83**, 19–**108** (104), 0–**77**, 0–**69**, **87**–0, **68**–37, 23–**86**, **79**–0; Evening: 0–**80**, 30–**90**, 6–**102** (102), 9–**99**
87	Highest break	**104**
0	Century breaks	**2**

== Qualifying ==
Matches were played between 14 and 17 June 2019 at the Ponds Forge International Sports Centre in Sheffield, England. Matches involving Mark Allen, Sam Craigie, Ding Junhui, John Higgins, Yan Bingtao, Sunny Akani, Anthony McGill and Judd Trump, were played in Daqing. All matches were the best-of-11-frames.

(Northern Ireland) Mark Allen	6–1	(England) Peter Lines
(England) Sam Craigie	6–2	(China) Pang Junxu
(England) Mark Davis	6–2	(China) Bai Langning
(England) Matthew Selt	6–1	(Wales) Lee Walker
(England) Ali Carter	6–4	(England) Mitchell Mann
(Scotland) Alan McManus	6–5	(England) Andy Hicks
(Wales) Ryan Day	6–5	(Wales) Jamie Clarke
(Norway) Kurt Maflin	6–1	(China) Long Zehuang
(England) Martin O'Donnell	1–6	(England) Ashley Carty
(China) Xiao Guodong	6–4	(Israel) Eden Sharav
(China) Zhao Xintong	6–4	(Hong Kong) Andy Lee
(China) Ding Junhui	6–5	(Germany) Simon Lichtenberg
(China) Liang Wenbo	6–4	(England) Craig Steadman
(China) Lyu Haotian	4–6	(Wales) Duane Jones
(Wales) Daniel Wells	6–2	(Malta) Alex Borg
(England) Barry Hawkins	6–3	(England) Jimmy White
(Scotland) John Higgins	6–5	(China) Wu Yize
(England) Anthony Hamilton	1–6	(England) David Grace
(China) Li Hang	2–6	(England) Elliot Slessor
(Thailand) Noppon Saengkham	4–6	(England) Louis Heathcote
(England) Stuart Bingham	6–1	(China) Tian Pengfei
(England) Mark Joyce	6–3	(China) Luo Honghao
(Scotland) Graeme Dott	6–2	(China) Fan Zhengyi
(Wales) Michael White	6–4	(Wales) Jackson Page
(Cyprus) Michael Georgiou	2–6	(China) Chang Bingyu
(China) Yan Bingtao	6–1	(England) Alfie Burden
(China) Yuan Sijun	6–0	(Northern Ireland) Gerard Greene
(England) Shaun Murphy	6–4	(England) Riley Parsons
(Thailand) Thepchaiya Un-Nooh	6–3	(England) Rod Lawler
(England) Ricky Walden	6–0	(China) Chen Zifan
(Republic of Ireland) Fergal O'Brien	2–6	(England) Nigel Bond
(Australia) Neil Robertson	6–0	(England) Oliver Lines

(Wales) Mark Williams	6–5	(England) John Astley
(England) Mike Dunn	0–6	(Wales) Jak Jones
(China) Zhou Yuelong	6–5	(China) Mei Xiwen
(England) Robert Milkins	6–3	(Switzerland) Alexander Ursenbacher
(Belgium) Luca Brecel	w/o–w/d	(China) Zhang Jiankang
(Thailand) Sunny Akani	6–4	(China) Li Yingdong
(England) Gary Wilson	6–2	(China) Lei Peifan
(England) Peter Ebdon	6–5	(Iran) Soheil Vahedi
(England) Michael Holt	6–3	(England) Hammad Miah
(Scotland) Anthony McGill	6–3	(China) Zhao Jianbo
(Republic of Ireland) Ken Doherty	6–4	(England) David Lilley
(England) David Gilbert	6–0	(England) James Cahill
(England) Ben Woollaston	6–4	(Malaysia) Thor Chuan Leong
(England) Mark King	6–2	(Poland) Adam Stefanow
(England) Liam Highfield	6–4	(China) Si Jiahui
(England) Mark Selby	6–1	(England) Sam Baird
(England) Kyren Wilson	6–4	(England) Brandon Sargeant
(England) Robbie Williams	6–4	(England) Billy Joe Castle
(England) Tom Ford	6–1	(Scotland) Fraser Patrick
(Iran) Hossein Vafaei	6–5	(Wales) Dominic Dale
(England) Jack Lisowski	6–3	(China) Chen Feilong
(England) Andrew Higginson	6–4	(China) Xu Si
(England) Jimmy Robertson	6–3	(England) Barry Pinches
(Wales) Matthew Stevens	6–2	(Wales) Kishan Hirani
(England) Chris Wakelin	6–2	(Republic of Ireland) Ross Bulman
(England) Joe Perry	6–4	(England) Joe O'Connor
(England) Stuart Carrington	6–1	(Poland) Kacper Filipiak
(Scotland) Stephen Maguire	6–1	(England) Jamie O'Neill
(Scotland) Scott Donaldson	6–2	(England) Ian Burns
(England) Martin Gould	6–2	(England) Harvey Chandler
(China) Lu Ning	2–6	(China) Zhang Anda
(England) Judd Trump	6–3	(Northern Ireland) Jordan Brown

== Century breaks ==
=== Televised stage centuries ===
A total of 63 century breaks were made during the televised stages of the tournament. Judd Trump and Mark Allen shared the highest break of the tournament, with both players making a break of 141. In addition, Trump made a total of 12 centuries, eight more than any other player. Four Centuries were made in held over matches, Three by Trump and one by Sam Craigie.

- 141, 131, 116, 113, 111, 108, 102, 104, 102, 101, 100, 100 – Judd Trump
- 141, 119, 117, 101 – Mark Allen
- 137 – Ali Carter
- 136 – Joe Perry
- 133 – Stephen Maguire
- 132, 126, 100 – Gary Wilson
- 132 – Xiao Guodong
- 131, 126, 104, 101 – Ding Junhui
- 131 – Tom Ford
- 128, 108 – Louis Heathcote
- 127, 103 – Mark Selby
- 124, 104 – Sam Craigie
- 123, 105 – Stuart Bingham
- 121 – Jimmy Robertson
- 120, 105 – Liang Wenbo
- 119, 103, 102, 100 – Neil Robertson
- 118 – Jak Jones
- 116 – Daniel Wells
- 115, 103 – Scott Donaldson
- 115 – Yuan Sijun
- 111, 102 – Luca Brecel
- 110 – Elliot Slessor
- 109, 102, 101 – David Gilbert
- 107, 104 – Kurt Maflin
- 106, 103 – Shaun Murphy
- 105 – Yan Bingtao
- 102 – Zhou Yuelong
- 100 – Kyren Wilson
- 100 – Liam Highfield
- 100 – Mark Joyce

=== Qualifying stage centuries ===
A total of 42 century breaks were made during the qualifying tournament preceding the event, including a maximum break from Tom Ford.

- 147 – Tom Ford
- 139, 100 – Luo Honghao
- 137, 116 – Joe Perry
- 135 – Scott Donaldson
- 134, 103 – Liam Highfield
- 134, 124 – Mark Selby
- 133 – Stuart Bingham
- 132, 126 – Lyu Haotian
- 129, 108 – Stephen Maguire
- 127, 115, 112 – Neil Robertson
- 126, 112 – Noppon Saengkham
- 123, 104 – Michael Holt
- 120 – Graeme Dott
- 118, 102 – Ali Carter
- 118 – Bai Langning
- 115 – Ashley Carty
- 115 – Tian Pengfei
- 115 – Xiao Guodong
- 111 – Chang Bingyu
- 111 – Gary Wilson
- 111 – Ryan Day
- 108 – Eden Sharav
- 108 – Yuan Sijun
- 107 – Brandon Sargeant
- 107 – Liang Wenbo
- 106 – Kurt Maflin
- 105 – Anthony Hamilton
- 103 – Louis Heathcote
- 101 – Jamie Clarke
- 101 – Mei Xiwen
- 100 – Hossein Vafaei
