= Yousra Matine =

Moroccan snooker player (born 1996)

Personal information
- Born: 6 April 1996 (age 30)

Sport
- Country: Morocco
- Sport: Snooker
Medal record
Representing Morocco
Snooker
African Games
Gold medal – first place	2019 Casablanca	Individual
Silver medal – second place	2019 Casablanca	Mixed doubles

Yousra Matine (born 6 April 1996) is a Moroccan snooker player. She won the Women's Individual Snooker gold medal at the 2019 African Games, and was champion at the 2025 All-Africa Women's Championship.

== Biography ==
Yousra Matine was taught to play snooker by her fiancé Amine Amiri in 2016. She won the Women's Individual Snooker gold medal at the 2019 African Games; this was the first year that snooker had been included as an event at the Games. There were four entries in the women's individual snooker event. Matine beat Hakima Kissai 3–0, Yara Sharafeldin 2–1 and Gantan Elaskary 2–0. Matine also won the mixed-doubles silver medal with Amine Amiri.

During the 2019–20 season, Matine and Hind Bennani became the first Moroccan players to compete on the World Women's Snooker Tour, travelling to England to participate in tournaments.

In 2023, Matine represented the Africa and Rest of the World team at the World Confederation of Billiard Sports Championship in Ankara, Turkey. She defeated Anita Chan in the women's snooker group stage, but lost her other four matches.

At the 2025 World Snooker Federation Women's Championship in Saïdia, Morocco, Matine reached the semi-finals of the Challenge Cup, a subsidiary competition for players who did not qualify for the main tournament's quarter-finals. She lost to eventual Challenge Cup winner Bennani.

Matine took the 2025 All-Africa Women's Championship title in Saïdia, Morocco, winning all seven matches she played including a 4–3 defeat of Loubna Lazim in the final.
