= 2020 German Masters =

Snooker tournament

2020 BetVictor German Masters

Tournament information
- Dates: 29 January – 2 February 2020
- Venue: Tempodrom
- City: Berlin
- Country: Germany
- Organisation: World Snooker Tour
- Format: Ranking event
- Total prize fund: £400,000
- Winner's share: £80,000
- Highest break: Tom Ford (ENG) (143)

Final
- Champion: Judd Trump (ENG)
- Runner-up: Neil Robertson (AUS)
- Score: 9–6

The 2020 German Masters (officially the 2020 BetVictor German Masters) was a professional ranking snooker tournament that took place from 29 January to 2 February 2020 in the Tempodrom in Berlin, Germany. The tournament was the tenth ranking event of the 2019–2020 snooker season. It was the 14th edition of the German Masters, first held in 1995 as the 1995 German Open. The event featured a prize fund of £400,000 with £80,000 being given to the winner.

Kyren Wilson was the defending champion after defeating David Gilbert 9–6 in the 2019 final. He lost 4–5 to Zhao Xintong in the second qualifying round. The final was contested between the reigning world champion Judd Trump and Neil Robertson, who had won the preceding European Masters event. Trump won the final defeating Robertson 9–6. Trump's win was his 15th ranking title and fourth of the season.

This tournament was the last professional tournament for Peter Ebdon, who retired due to spine and neck degradation. Ebdon lost 4–5 in the first qualifying round to Matthew Stevens.

== Format ==
The 2020 German Masters was a professional snooker tournament held at the Tempodrom in Berlin, Germany, between 29 January and 3 February 2020. This was the 13th edition of the German Masters tournament, being held since 2011, and previously between 1995 and 1998 as the German Open. It was the tenth ranking event of the 2019–20 snooker season following the European Masters and preceding the World Grand Prix. It was played as the best-of-nine-frames until the semi-finals, which were best-of-11-frames, followed by a best-of-17-frames final. The event featured 32 participants from the World Snooker Tour with two qualifying rounds which took place from 20 to 22 December 2019 in Barnsley, England.

=== Prize fund ===
The event featured a total prize fund of £400,000 with the winner receiving £80,000. The event was the second of the "European Series" which included the European Masters, Snooker Shoot Out and Gibraltar Open all sponsored by sports betting company BetVictor. The player accumulating the highest amount of prize money over the four events received a bonus of £150,000. The breakdown of prize money for the tournament is shown below:

- Winner: £80,000
- Runner-up: £35,000
- Semi-final: £20,000
- Quarter-final: £10,000
- Last 16: £5,000
- Last 32: £4,000
- Last 64: £3,000
- Highest break: £5,000
- Total: £400,000

== Tournament summary ==
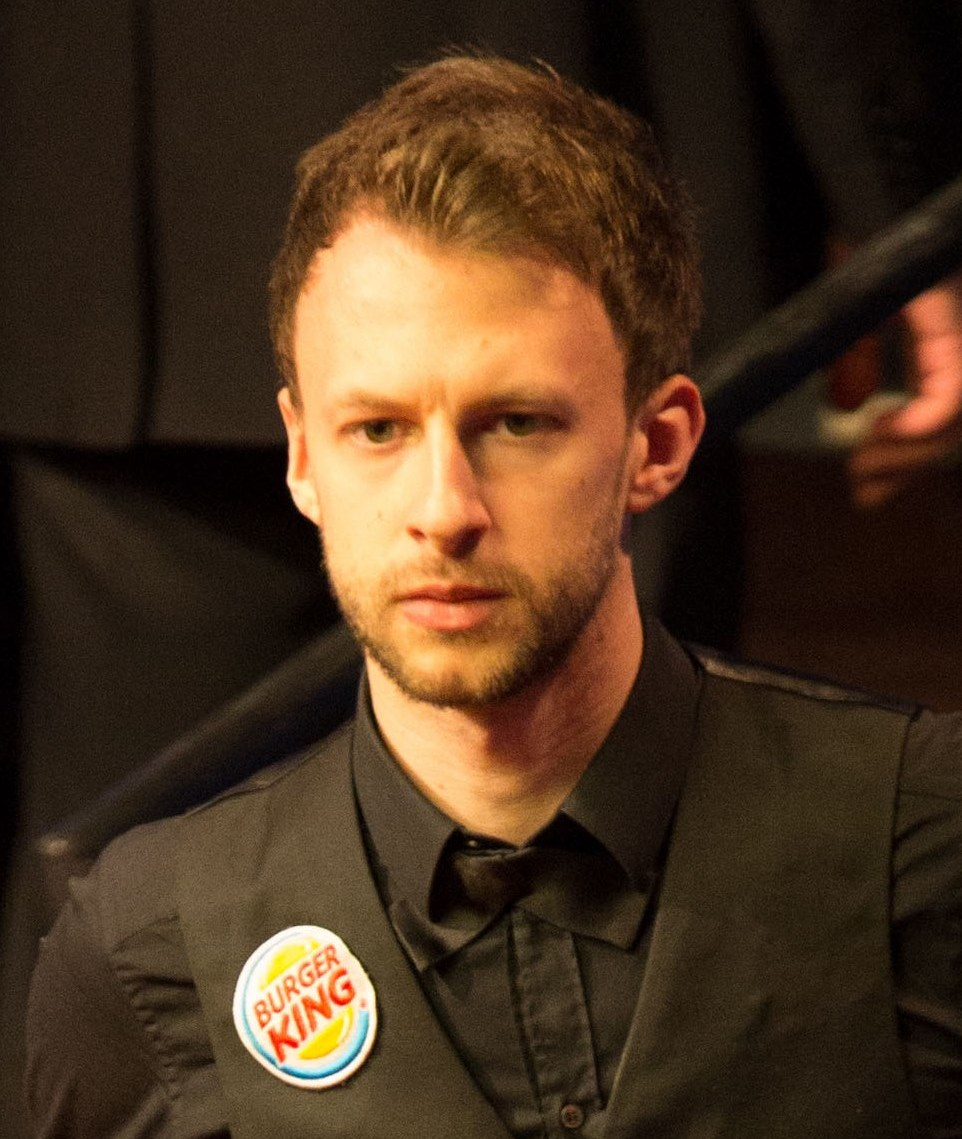
Judd Trump won the event, defeating Neil Robertson 9–6.

The first round of the German Masters began on 29 January 2020. A commemorative cake in the shape of a snooker table was baked to celebrate the 10th edition of the event to be held in the Tempodrome. Four-time world champion John Higgins lost his first round match to world number 59 Robbie Williams 4–5. Three players completed a whitewash in the first round, with Sunny Akani, Michael Georgiou and Matthew Selt all winning 5–0. Scott Donaldson defeated 2019 UK Championship winner Ding Junhui 5–4. The win gave Donaldson enough ranking points to qualify for the 2020 World Grand Prix.

In the second round, Georgiou defeated Akani 5–4. Akani continued playing on the practice tables for two days after his loss. European Masters finalist Zhao Xintong defeated 17th seed Gary Wilson 5–1. In a rematch of the 2018 final, 19th seed Graeme Dott played third seed Mark Williams, with Dott winning 5–2. World number two Neil Robertson completed a second straight whitewash over Elliot Slessor in the quarter-finals, having also defeated Mitchell Mann in the second round 5–0. Shaun Murphy defeated Xintong 5–3, Dott defeated Selt 5–2 and Trump defeated Georgiou 5–1. The first semi-final was played between Dott and Trump. With no more than one frame between the two, they tied at 4–4. However, Trump won frame nine with a break of 110 and won the match 6–4. The second semi-final was between Robertson and Murphy. Robertson won five frames in a row with breaks of 73, 136, 62, 53 and 129 to win 6–1. Robertson reached the final having lost only two frames in the previous four matches.

The final was played between Neil Robertson and Judd Trump on 2 February 2020. This was the second time in the 2019–20 snooker season that the pair had met in a final, having done so at the 2019 Champion of Champions. If Robertson won the final, he would be guaranteed to win the European Series. It was held as a best-of-17 frames match, held over two sessions. Robertson won four of the first six frames, with Trump winning the final two frames of the first session to tie the match at 4–4. Trump restarted the match, winning a further two frames to lead 6–4. Robertson won frame 11, before Trump won frame 12 to lead 7–5 going into the interval. The pair shared the next two frames, before Trump won the match 9–6 with a break of 120 in frame 15. This was Trump's 15th career ranking event title, his fourth of the season.

== Main draw ==
Below are the event's results from the last-32 stage to the final. Player names in bold denote match winners. Numbers in brackets denote player seedings.

**Last 32**; Best of 9 frames
**Zhao Xintong (CHN)**	**5**
Anthony McGill (SCO) (32)	2
Jak Jones (WAL)	1
**Gary Wilson (ENG) (17)**	**5**
Tom Ford (ENG) (24)	1
**Shaun Murphy (ENG) (9)**	**5**
**Scott Donaldson (SCO) (25)**	**5**
Ding Junhui (CHN) (8)	4
John Higgins (SCO) (5)	4
**Robbie Williams (ENG)**	**5**
Robert Milkins (ENG)	3
**Elliot Slessor (ENG)**	**5**
Alexander Ursenbacher (SUI)	4
**Mitchell Mann (ENG)**	**5**
Ian Burns (ENG)	1
**Neil Robertson (AUS) (4)**	**5**
**Mark Williams (WAL) (3)**	**5**
Yuan Sijun (CHN)	2
Tian Pengfei (CHN)	4
**Graeme Dott (SCO) (19)**	**5**
Kishan Hirani (WAL)	2
**Nigel Bond (ENG)**	**5**
**Matthew Selt (ENG) (27)**	**5**
Jamie Clarke (WAL)	0
Gerard Greene (NIR)	1
**Michael Georgiou (CYP)**	**5**
David Grace (ENG)	0
**Sunny Akani (THA)**	**5**
**Luca Brecel (BEL)**	**5**
Joe Perry (ENG) (15)	0
Noppon Saengkham (THA) (31)	1
**Judd Trump (ENG) (2)**	**5**

**Last 16**; Best of 9 frames
**(China) Zhao Xintong**	**5**
(England) Gary Wilson (17)	1
**(England) Shaun Murphy (9)**	**5**
(Scotland) Scott Donaldson (25)	2
(England) Robbie Williams	3
**(England) Elliot Slessor**	**5**
(England) Mitchell Mann	0
**(Australia) Neil Robertson (4)**	**5**
(Wales) Mark Williams (3)	2
**(Scotland) Graeme Dott (19)**	**5**
(England) Nigel Bond	2
**(England) Matthew Selt (27)**	**5**
**(Cyprus) Michael Georgiou**	**5**
(Thailand) Sunny Akani	3
(Belgium) Luca Brecel	3
**(England) Judd Trump (2)**	**5**

**Quarter-finals**; Best of 9 frames
(China) Zhao Xintong	3
**(England) Shaun Murphy (9)**	**5**
(England) Elliot Slessor	0
**(Australia) Neil Robertson (4)**	**5**
**(Scotland) Graeme Dott (19)**	**5**
(England) Matthew Selt (27)	2
(Cyprus) Michael Georgiou	1
**(England) Judd Trump (2)**	**5**

**Semi-finals**; Best of 11 frames
(England) Shaun Murphy (9)	1
**(Australia) Neil Robertson (4)**	**6**
(Scotland) Graeme Dott (19)	4
**(England) Judd Trump (2)**	**6**

**Final**; Best of 17 frames
(Australia) Neil Robertson (4)	6
**(England) Judd Trump (2)**	**9**

=== Final ===
Final: Best of 17 frames. Referee: Rob Spencer. Tempodrom, Berlin, Germany, 2 February 2020.
Neil Robertson (4); Australia	6–**9**	**Judd Trump** (2); England
Afternoon: 0–**82**, **74**–48, 29–**77**, **120**–1 (120), **72**–71, **78**–4, 0–**98**, 0–**77**; Evening: 7–**65**, 33–**79**, **67**–22, 0–**75**, 0–**67**, **65**–25, 12–**101** (100)
**120**	Highest break	100
1	Century breaks	1

== Qualifying ==
Qualifying for the event took place between 20 and 22 December 2019 at the Barnsley Metrodome in Barnsley, England. There were two rounds of qualifying with matches being played as best-of-9 frames. Defending champion Kyren Wilson did not qualify for the event, after losing 4–5 to Zhao Xintong in the second round. Peter Ebdon played his last professional match in a first round loss to Matthew Stevens.

=== Round 1 ===
Kyren Wilson (ENG) (1)	5–1	Rod Lawler (ENG)
Ken Doherty (IRL)	4–5	Zhao Xintong (CHN)
Anthony McGill (SCO) (32)	5–2	Jackson Page (WAL)
Liang Wenbo (CHN)	5–3	Jimmy White (ENG)
Ali Carter (ENG) (16)	5–3	Simon Lichtenberg (GER)
Jak Jones (WAL)	5–4	Sam Craigie (ENG)
Gary Wilson (ENG) (17)	5–3	Alan McManus (SCO)
Xu Si (CHN)	5–3	Hossein Vafaei (IRN)
Oliver Lines (ENG)	5–2	Alfie Burden (ENG)
Tom Ford (ENG) (24)	5–3	Ben Woollaston (ENG)
Thor Chuan Leong (MYS)	1–5	Dominic Dale (WAL)
Shaun Murphy (ENG) (9)	5–2	Joe O'Connor (ENG)
Harvey Chandler (ENG)	5–2	Billy Joe Castle (ENG)
Scott Donaldson (SCO) (25)	5–1	Si Jiahui (CHN)
Matthew Stevens (WAL)	5–4	Peter Ebdon (ENG)
Ding Junhui (CHN) (8)	5–0	Alex Borg (MLT)
John Higgins (SCO) (5)	5–1	Adam Stefanow (POL)
Li Hang (CHN)	5–4	Mei Xiwen (CHN)
Mark Davis (ENG) (28)	5–2	Chang Bingyu (CHN)
David Lilley (ENG)	1–5	Robbie Williams (ENG)
Stuart Bingham (ENG) (12)	5–0	Lu Ning (CHN)
Duane Jones (WAL)	0–5	Robert Milkins (ENG)
Jimmy Robertson (ENG) (21)	5–0	Eden Sharav (ISR)
Elliot Slessor (ENG)	5–3	Fraser Patrick (SCO)
Michael Holt (ENG)	1–5	Alexander Ursenbacher (SUI)
Thepchaiya Un-Nooh (THA) (20)	5–1	Zhang Jiankang (CHN)
Chris Wakelin (ENG)	4–5	Mitchell Mann (ENG)
Jack Lisowski (ENG) (13)	1–5	Michael White (WAL)
Ian Burns (ENG)	5–1	Paul Davison (ENG) (WC)
Lyu Haotian (CHN) (29)	1–5	Zhang Anda (CHN)
Lukas Kleckers (GER) (WC)	4–5	Igor Figueiredo (BRA)
Neil Robertson (AUS) (4)	5–3	Martin O'Donnell (ENG)

Mark Williams (WAL) (3)	5–1	Andy Hicks (ENG)
Mark King (ENG)	5–1	Riley Parsons (ENG)
Zhou Yuelong (CHN) (30)	5–0	Iulian Boiko (UKR) (WC)
Yuan Sijun (CHN)	5–3	Chen Feilong (CHN)
Stephen Maguire (SCO) (14)	5–3	Soheil Vahedi (IRN)
Tian Pengfei (CHN)	5–4	Lei Peifan (CHN)
Graeme Dott (SCO) (19)	5–4	Craig Steadman (ENG)
Luo Honghao (CHN)	2–5	Ashley Carty (ENG)
Sam Baird (ENG)	4–5	Kishan Hirani (WAL)
Ryan Day (WAL) (22)	3–5	Andrew Higginson (ENG)
Liam Highfield (ENG)	2–5	Nigel Bond (ENG)
David Gilbert (ENG) (11)	4–5	Jordan Brown (NIR)
Bai Langning (CHN)	5–4	James Cahill (ENG)
Matthew Selt (ENG) (27)	5–3	Peter Lines (ENG)
Jamie Clarke (WAL)	5–2	Brandon Sargeant (ENG)
Mark Selby (ENG) (6)	5–0	Fan Zhengyi (CHN)
Mark Allen (NIR) (7)	5–3	Kurt Maflin (NOR)
Gerard Greene (NIR)	5–3	Lee Walker (WAL)
Ricky Walden (ENG) (26)	4–5	Martin Gould (ENG)
Mark Joyce (ENG)	0–5	Michael Georgiou (CYP)
Barry Hawkins (ENG) (10)	2–5	Ross Bulman (IRL) (WC)
John Astley (ENG)	4–5	David Grace (ENG)
Xiao Guodong (CHN) (23)	0–5	Sunny Akani (THA)
Anthony Hamilton (ENG)	5–1	Hammad Miah (ENG)
Luca Brecel (BEL)	5–3	Louis Heathcote (ENG)
Yan Bingtao (CHN) (18)	5–4	Marco Fu (HKG)
Barry Pinches (ENG)	5–3	Andy Lee (HKG)
Joe Perry (ENG) (15)	5–2	Fergal O'Brien (IRL)
Jamie O'Neill (ENG)	4–5	Kacper Filipiak (POL)
Noppon Saengkham (THA) (31)	5–4	Mike Dunn (ENG)
Stuart Carrington (ENG)	5–0	Chen Zifan (CHN)
Judd Trump (ENG) (2)	5–1	Daniel Wells (WAL)

=== Round 2 ===
(England) Kyren Wilson (1)	4–5	(China) Zhao Xintong
(Scotland) Anthony McGill (32)	5–1	(China) Liang Wenbo
(England) Ali Carter (16)	4–5	(Wales) Jak Jones
(England) Gary Wilson (17)	5–1	(China) Xu Si
(England) Oliver Lines	3–5	(England) Tom Ford (24)
(Wales) Dominic Dale	1–5	(England) Shaun Murphy (9)
(England) Harvey Chandler	4–5	(Scotland) Scott Donaldson (25)
(Wales) Matthew Stevens	2–5	(China) Ding Junhui (8)
(Scotland) John Higgins (5)	5–4	(China) Li Hang
(England) Mark Davis (28)	4–5	(England) Robbie Williams
(England) Stuart Bingham (12)	3–5	(England) Robert Milkins
(England) Jimmy Robertson (21)	2–5	(England) Elliot Slessor
(Switzerland) Alexander Ursenbacher	5–2	(Thailand) Thepchaiya Un-Nooh (20)
(England) Mitchell Mann	5–1	(Wales) Michael White
(England) Ian Burns	5–3	(China) Zhang Anda
(Brazil) Igor Figueiredo	2–5	(Australia) Neil Robertson (4)

(Wales) Mark Williams (3)	5–2	(England) Mark King
(China) Zhou Yuelong (30)	3–5	(China) Yuan Sijun
(Scotland) Stephen Maguire (14)	3–5	(China) Tian Pengfei
(Scotland) Graeme Dott (19)	5–0	(England) Ashley Carty
(Wales) Kishan Hirani	5–3	(England) Andrew Higginson
(England) Nigel Bond	5–3	(Northern Ireland) Jordan Brown
(China) Bai Langning	3–5	(England) Matthew Selt (27)
(Wales) Jamie Clarke	5–4	(England) Mark Selby (6)
(Northern Ireland) Mark Allen (7)	4–5	(Northern Ireland) Gerard Greene
(England) Martin Gould	2–5	(Cyprus) Michael Georgiou
(Republic of Ireland) Ross Bulman (WC)	3–5	(England) David Grace
(Thailand) Sunny Akani	5–1	(England) Anthony Hamilton
(Belgium) Luca Brecel	5–1	(China) Yan Bingtao (18)
(England) Barry Pinches	2–5	(England) Joe Perry (15)
(Poland) Kacper Filipiak	2–5	(Thailand) Noppon Saengkham (31)
(England) Stuart Carrington	2–5	(England) Judd Trump (2)

== Century breaks ==
=== Main stage centuries ===
There was a total of 33 century breaks during the tournament. The highest was a 138 made by John Higgins in his first round win over Robbie Williams.

- 138, 134 – John Higgins
- 136, 133, 129, 120, 101, 101 – Neil Robertson
- 134, 108 – Gary Wilson
- 133, 106 – Mark Williams
- 132 – Nigel Bond
- 132 – Scott Donaldson
- 130 – Elliot Slessor
- 129, 127 – Shaun Murphy
- 126 – Yuan Sijun
- 122, 119, 114, 110, 100 – Judd Trump
- 122, 102 – Luca Brecel
- 122 – Robbie Williams
- 121 – Graeme Dott
- 119 – Robert Milkins
- 112 – Michael Georgiou
- 111, 110 – Mitchell Mann
- 108 – Matthew Selt
- 102 – Sunny Akani

=== Qualifying stage centuries ===
There was a total of 77 century breaks during qualifying. The highest was a 143 made by Tom Ford in his second qualifying round match against Oliver Lines.

- 143, 129 – Tom Ford
- 142, 137, 124 – Michael Georgiou
- 141 – Hossein Vafaei
- 140, 106 – Robert Milkins
- 140 – Zhang Anda
- 139, 137, 127, 109 – Zhao Xintong
- 135 – John Astley
- 135 – Louis Heathcote
- 134, 131 – Yan Bingtao
- 133 – Liang Wenbo
- 133 – Zhou Yuelong
- 132, 130 – Kyren Wilson
- 132, 103 – Ricky Walden
- 131, 111 – Kacper Filipiak
- 131 – Kurt Maflin
- 130 – Xu Si
- 126, 106 – Dominic Dale
- 126 – Mark Davis
- 124, 115 – Stuart Bingham
- 123, 113 – Li Hang
- 123, 105 – Luca Brecel
- 122 – Kishan Hirani
- 119 – Jack Lisowski
- 118 – Ali Carter
- 118 – Fraser Patrick
- 118 – Joe Perry
- 117 – Sam Craigie
- 116, 109, 107 – Judd Trump
- 115, 100, 100 – Gary Wilson
- 115 – Ian Burns
- 114, 102, 100 – Ashley Carty
- 114 – Jimmy Robertson
- 113 – Soheil Vahedi
- 111 – Noppon Saengkham
- 110 – Alexander Ursenbacher
- 110 – Anthony Hamilton
- 109 – Bai Langning
- 109 – Lee Walker
- 108, 101 – Igor Figueiredo
- 108 – Sam Baird
- 107 – Andrew Higginson
- 106 – Barry Hawkins
- 104, 103 – David Gilbert
- 104, 100 – Matthew Stevens
- 103 – Fergal O'Brien
- 102 – Scott Donaldson
- 101 – Yuan Sijun
- 100, 100 – Neil Robertson
- 100 – Mark Selby
- 100 – Ryan Day
