= Snooker at the 2019 African Games =

- Venue: Hotel Farah
- Location: Casablanca, Morocco
- Dates: 20–24 August
- Competitors: 13 from 5 nations

Snooker at the 2019 African Games was held from 20 to 24 August 2019 in Casablanca, Morocco.

In January 2019, it was announced that snooker would be included as a medal event at the 2019 African Games.

Five countries were scheduled to compete in snooker but competitors from Algeria and Tunisia did not start in their events.

== Participating nations ==
- Algeria (2)
- Egypt (4)
- Morocco (4)
- Sudan (1)
- Tunisia (2)

== Medal table ==
* Host nation (Morocco)

Rank	Nation	Gold	Silver	Bronze	Total
1	Morocco (MAR)*	3	1	2	6
2	Egypt (EGY)	0	2	1	3
Totals (2 entries)		3	3	3	9

== Medal summary ==
Event	Gold	Silver	Bronze
Men	Amine Amiri; Morocco	Abdelhamid Abdelrahman; Egypt	Yassine Bellamine; Morocco
Women	Youssra Matine; Morocco	Gantan Elaskary; Egypt	Hakima Kissai; Morocco
Mixed doubles	Morocco; Yassine Bellamine; Hakima Kissai	Morocco; Amine Amiri; Youssra Matine	Egypt; Mohamed Alakrady; Yara Sharafeldin
