= Kishan Hirani =

Welsh snooker player

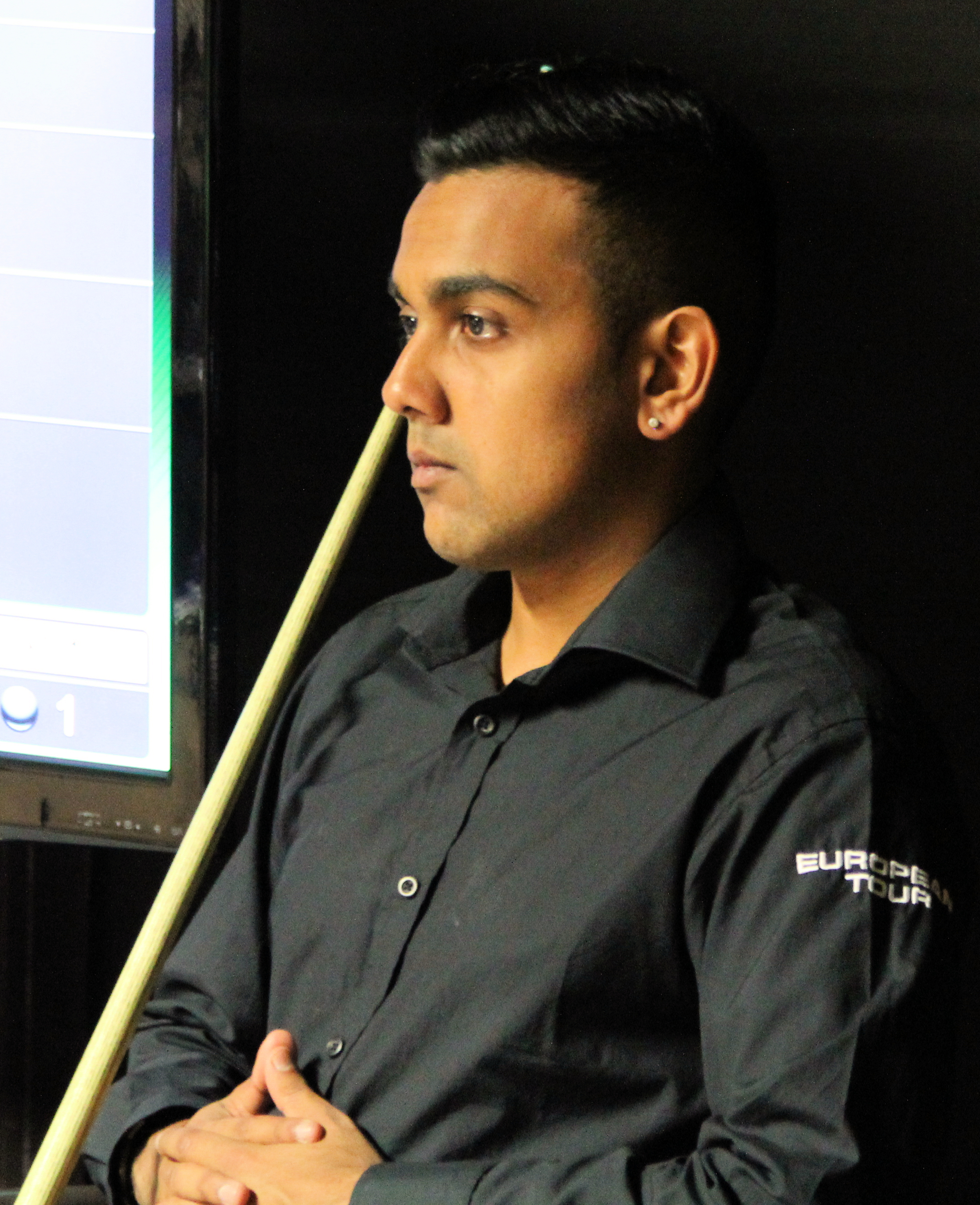
- Hirani at the 2014 Paul Hunter Classic

Personal information
- Born: 2 June 1992 (age 34)

Sport
- Country: Wales
- Sport: Snooker
- Professional: 2015-2020
- Highest ranking: 84 (September 2019)
- Best ranking finish: Last 32 (x1)

Kishan H. Hirani (born 2 June 1992) is a Welsh retired professional snooker player.

== Career ==
Hirani qualified for his first professional tournament in the 2017 Paul Hunter Classic, winning three matches. He played Chris Wakelin in the first round, but lost 0–4. Having won the third event of the 2018 Q School, he won a two-year tour card for the 2018–19 and 2019–20 snooker seasons, defeating Simon Bedford 4–2.

=== 2018/19 season ===
In the 2018 Paul Hunter Classic, Hirani qualified for the second round, defeating Jamie Clarke 4–3 in the first round, before losing to Craig Steadman in the second round 0–4. Hirani played in the first round of the 2018 UK Championship, but lost 6–2 to Neil Robertson.

In the summer of 2018, Hirani stated that he intended playing in as many tournaments as possible during his two-year tour card, but that he was seeking a waistcoat sponsor to enable him to do so

== Performance and rankings timeline ==
Tournament	2015/ 16	2016/ 17	2017/ 18	2018/ 19	2019/ 20
Ranking (Note: It shows the ranking at the beginning of the season.)	(Note: He was an amateur.)			(Note: New players on the Main Tour don't have a ranking.)	88
Ranking tournaments
Riga Masters	MR	A	A	LQ	LQ
International Championship	A	A	A	LQ	LQ
China Championship	NH	NR	A	LQ	1R
English Open	NH	A	A	1R	1R
World Open	NH	A	A	LQ	LQ
Northern Ireland Open	NH	A	A	2R	1R
UK Championship	A	A	A	1R	1R
Scottish Open	NH	A	A	1R	2R
European Masters	NH	A	A	LQ	LQ
German Masters	A	A	A	LQ	1R
World Grand Prix	DNQ	DNQ	DNQ	DNQ	DNQ
Welsh Open	A	A	A	1R	1R
Shoot-Out	NR	A	A	2R	1R
Players Championship	DNQ	DNQ	DNQ	DNQ	DNQ
Gibraltar Open	MR	A	A	1R	1R
Tour Championship	Not Held			DNQ	DNQ
World Championship	LQ	A	A	LQ	LQ
Former ranking tournaments
Paul Hunter Classic	MR	LQ	1R	2R	NR
Indian Open	NH	A	A	LQ	NH
China Open	A	A	A	1R	NH

Performance Table Legend
LQ	lost in the qualifying draw	#R	lost in the early rounds of the tournament (WR = Wildcard round, RR = Round robin)	QF	lost in the quarter-finals
SF	lost in the semi-finals	F	lost in the final	W	won the tournament
DNQ	did not qualify for the tournament	A	did not participate in the tournament	WD	withdrew from the tournament

NH / Not Held	means an event was not held.
NR / Non-Ranking Event	means an event is/was no longer a ranking event.
R / Ranking Event	means an event is/was a ranking event.
MR / Minor-Ranking Event	means an event is/was a minor-ranking event.

== Career finals ==
=== Amateur finals: 1 (1 title) ===
Outcome	No.	Year	Championship	Opponent in the final	Score
Winner	1.	2016	Snookerbacker Classic - Qualifier 11 - Gloucester	(England) Jamie Bodle	4–0
