= 2020 Gibraltar Open =

Snooker tournament

2020 BetVictor Gibraltar Open
Tournament information
- Dates: 13–15 March 2020
- Venue: Europa Point Sports Complex
- City: Gibraltar
- Organisation: World Snooker Tour
- Format: Ranking event
- Total prize fund: £251,000
- Winner's share: £50,000
- Highest break: Judd Trump (ENG) (144)

Final
- Champion: Judd Trump (ENG)
- Runner-up: Kyren Wilson (ENG)
- Score: 4–3

The 2020 Gibraltar Open (officially the 2020 BetVictor Gibraltar Open) was a professional snooker tournament that took place from 13 to 15 March 2020 at the Europa Point Sports Complex in Gibraltar with qualifying rounds occurring on 11 and 12 March 2020. It was the fifteenth ranking event of the 2019–20 snooker season, and the final tournament in the European Series, following the German Masters, European Masters and Snooker Shoot Out. The event was the fifth Gibraltar Open tournament, first held in 2015. The event was organized by the World Professional Billiards and Snooker Association and sponsored by BetVictor.

Due to the COVID-19 pandemic, matches were originally limited to a maximum audience of 100. After the first day, all matches were played without any spectators. A number of professional players withdrew from the event, alongside 54 amateur players and a series of referees; in some cases matches were played between players without referees.

The defending champion was Stuart Bingham who defeated Ryan Day 4–1 in the 2019 final. Bingham lost 0–4 to Ben Woollaston in the third round of the event. Judd Trump won the championship – his 17th career and sixth ranking title of the season – after a 4–3 defeat of Kyren Wilson in the final. Winning six events became the record for the most ranking titles in a season with the victory. The tournament featured a total of £251,000 with the winner receiving £50,000. In addition to the winners purse, Trump also secured £150,000 for scoring the most ranking points across the European Series. There was a total of 63 century breaks made during the event, the highest of which a 144 made by Trump in frame three of the final against Wilson.

== Tournament format ==
The event was the fifth iteration of the Gibraltar Open, having been first held in 2015. It took place from 13 to 15 March 2020 at the Europa Point Sports Complex in Gibraltar. The event was the 15th ranking tournament of the 2019–20 snooker season after the Players Championship, and preceding the Tour Championship. The defending champion was Stuart Bingham who had defeated Ryan Day 4–1 in the 2019 final. The Gibraltar Open was the final event of the 2020 BetVictor European Series, following the 2020 European Masters, 2020 German Masters and 2020 Snooker Shoot Out. The tournament was organised by the World Professional Billiards and Snooker Association and sponsored by BetVictor. Qualifying for the event was held from 11 to 12 March 2020 also at the Europa Point Sports Complex. Qualifying was played as best-of-5 frame matches, with the main stage of the event played as best-of-7 frames.

Due to the COVID-19 pandemic, matches were originally limited to a maximum audience of 100. After the first day, this restriction was tightened and matches were played without crowds. As a number of tour referees were unable to travel to the venue as a result of the pandemic, some matches were played without referees, with players respotting balls for their opponents. The event was broadcast by Eurosport across Europe.

=== Prize fund ===
The event featured a total prize fund of £251,000 with the winner receiving £50,000. This was an increase of £74,000 and £25,000 respectively from the 2019 event. As part of the BetVictor European Series the player with the highest amount of prize money received from the four events won an additional £150,000. Prior to the event, only Neil Robertson and Judd Trump were in contention for the prize.

The breakdown of prize money for this year is shown below:

- Winner: £50,000
- Runner-up: £20,000
- Semi-final: £6,000
- Quarter-final: £5,000
- Last 16: £4,000
- Last 32: £3,000
- Last 64: £2,000
- Highest break: £5,000
- Total: £251,000

== Summary ==
Due to the COVID-19 pandemic several players withdrew from the event; Neil Robertson, John Higgins, Mark Allen, David Gilbert, Stephen Maguire, Ali Carter, Graeme Dott, Noppon Saengkham, Kurt Maflin, Anthony Hamilton, Mike Dunn, Fraser Patrick and Jimmy White, with some being replaced in the draw by amateur players.

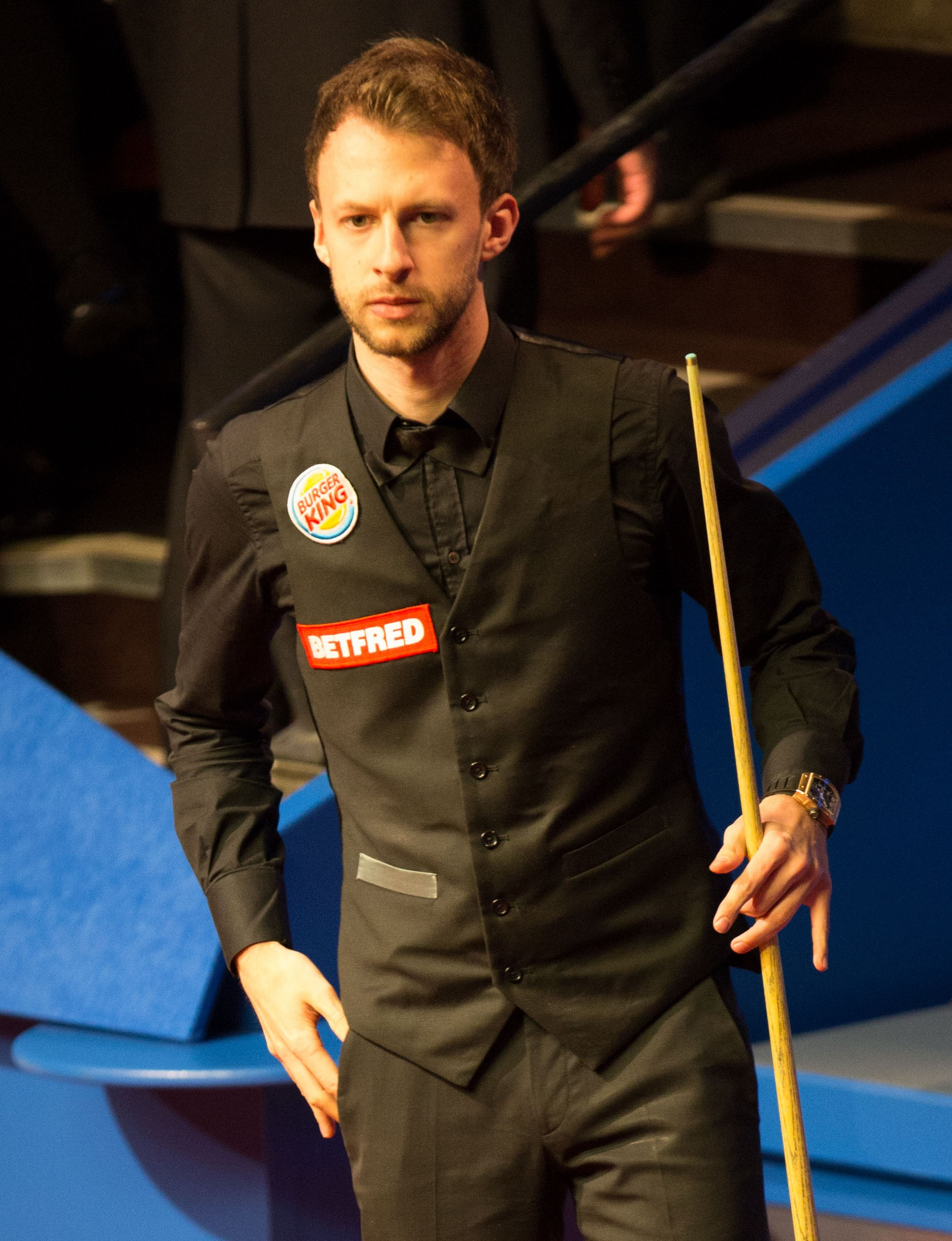
Judd Trump won the event, his sixth title of the season

The first three rounds of the event were played on 13 and 14 March 2020. Ben Woollaston defeated reigning Masters champion Stuart Bingham at the last 32 stage. Woollaston made breaks of 79 and 74 and eventually whitewashed Bingham 4–0. Thepchaiya Un-Nooh won his last 32 stage match 4–0 over Harvey Chandler in just 43 minutes. Three-time world champion Mark Williams defeated Martin Gould, but Mark Selby was defeated by Lyu Haotian. Kyren Wilson made breaks of 76, 90 and 107 to defeat Luca Brecel 4–0. Reigning world champion Judd Trump defeated native Gibraltan Lee Prickman, Brazil's Igor Figueiredo and Englishman Martin O'Donnell to reach the quarter-finals. Joe Perry was defeated by Jimmy Robertson in the last 32, meaning he did not have enough ranking points to qualify for the following event, the 2020 Tour Championship. Amine Amiri won the only main stage match of his two-year tour card, winning 4–3 over Adam Ashley.

The final four rounds, from the last 16 onwards, were all played on 15 March. Wilson defeated Fergal O'Brien on a deciding frame before winning over both Un-Nooh in the quarter-finals and Mark Williams in the semi-finals 4–0 each to reach the final. Trump defeated three Chinese players, Li Hang, Liang Wenbo and Xiao Guodong to meet Wilson in the final. The first frame of the best-of-seven frame final was won by Trump, who made a break of 125, with Wilson winning the second frame with a break of 115. Trump made a total clearance in his break of 144, before Wilson tied the score at 2–2. Wilson won frame five, before Trump made his third century break of the final, a 123 to force a deciding frame. Trump lead 52–0 but missed a black ball from its spot, but Wilson was unable to capitalise, allowing Trump to take the title with a break of 63 and win 4–3. In winning the event, Trump gained enough prize money to win the BetVictor European Series, earning a bonus of £150,000. This was also Trump's sixth ranking event win of the season, the most in a single season of any player. Trump commented: "To win six ranking titles in a season, something which no one else has ever done, is an amazing achievement for me... I wasn't thinking about that tonight until it got to 3–3."

== Main draw ==
Below is the full draw for the event. Players in bold denote match winners.

=== Top half ===
==== Section 1 ====
Last 128; Best of 7 frames
**Stuart Bingham (ENG) (1)**	**4**
Gerard Greene (NIR)	1
Nigel Bond (ENG)	3
**Barry Pinches (ENG)**	**4**
Anthony Hamilton (ENG)	w/d
**Ben Woollaston (ENG)**	**w/o**
**Rod Lawler (ENG)**	**4**
Dylan Craig (SCO)	1
Gary Wilson (ENG) (16)	2
**Thepchaiya Un-Nooh (THA)**	**4**
Mitchell Mann (ENG)	1
**Mei Xiwen (CHN)**	**4**
**Harvey Chandler (ENG)**	**4**
Riley Parsons (ENG)	0
Fraser Patrick (SCO)	w/d
**Anthony McGill (SCO)**	**w/o**

Last 64; Best of 7 frames
**(England) Stuart Bingham (1)**	**4**
(England) Barry Pinches	0
**(England) Ben Woollaston**	**4**
(England) Rod Lawler	3
**(Thailand) Thepchaiya Un-Nooh**	**4**
(China) Mei Xiwen	1
**(England) Harvey Chandler**	**4**
(Scotland) Anthony McGill	3

Last 32; Best of 7 frames
(England) Stuart Bingham (1)	0
**(England) Ben Woollaston**	**4**
**(Thailand) Thepchaiya Un-Nooh**	**4**
(England) Harvey Chandler	0

Last 16; Best of 7 frames
(England) Ben Woollaston	0
**(Thailand) Thepchaiya Un-Nooh**	**4**

==== Section 2 ====
Last 128; Best of 7 frames
Bai Langning (CHN)	2
**Fergal O'Brien (IRL)**	**4**
Joe O'Connor (ENG)	2
**Allan Taylor (ENG)**	**4**
**Chen Zifan (CHN)**	**4**
Zhang Jiankang (CHN)	0
David Gilbert (ENG) (9)	w/d
**Andrew Pagett (WAL)**	**w/o**
**Chris Wakelin (ENG)**	**w/o**
Jimmy White (ENG)	w/d
**Luca Brecel (BEL)**	**4**
Ken Doherty (IRL)	3
**David Lilley (ENG)**	**4**
Ameur Riad (MAR)	1
**Kyren Wilson (ENG) (8)**	**4**
Si Jiahui (CHN)	1

Last 64; Best of 7 frames
**(Republic of Ireland) Fergal O'Brien**	**4**
(England) Allan Taylor	2
**(China) Chen Zifan**	**4**
(Wales) Andrew Pagett	3
(England) Chris Wakelin	1
**(Belgium) Luca Brecel**	**4**
(England) David Lilley	0
**(England) Kyren Wilson (8)**	**4**

Last 32; Best of 7 frames
**(Republic of Ireland) Fergal O'Brien**	**4**
(China) Chen Zifan	2
(Belgium) Luca Brecel	0
**(England) Kyren Wilson (8)**	**4**

Last 16; Best of 7 frames
(Republic of Ireland) Fergal O'Brien	3
**(England) Kyren Wilson (8)**	**4**

==== Section 3 ====
Last 128; Best of 7 frames
**Mark Selby (ENG) (5)**	**w/o**
Noppon Saengkham (THA)	w/d
Fan Zhengyi (CHN)	1
**Lee Walker (WAL)**	**4**
**Lyu Haotian (CHN)**	**4**
Kristján Helgason (ISL)	3
Thor Chuan Leong (MYS)	2
**Chang Bingyu (CHN)**	**4**
Stephen Maguire (SCO) (12)	w/d
**Duane Jones (WAL)**	**w/o**
**Oliver Lines (ENG)**	**4**
Robbie Williams (ENG)	2
Liam Highfield (ENG)	0
**David Grace (ENG)**	**4**
Sam Baird (ENG)	0
**Zhang Anda (CHN)**	**4**

Last 64; Best of 7 frames
**(England) Mark Selby (5)**	**4**
(Wales) Lee Walker	1
**(China) Lyu Haotian**	**4**
(China) Chang Bingyu	2
(Wales) Duane Jones	1
**(England) Oliver Lines**	**4**
**(England) David Grace**	**4**
(China) Zhang Anda	1

Last 32; Best of 7 frames
(England) Mark Selby (5)	1
**(China) Lyu Haotian**	**4**
(England) Oliver Lines	1
**(England) David Grace**	**4**

Last 16; Best of 7 frames
(China) Lyu Haotian	1
**(England) David Grace**	**4**

==== Section 4 ====
Last 128; Best of 7 frames
Jak Jones (WAL)	1
**Mark King (ENG)**	**4**
**Scott Donaldson (SCO)**	**4**
Brandon Sargeant (ENG)	2
Ashley Carty (ENG)	0
**Soheil Vahedi (IRN)**	**4**
Yan Bingtao (CHN) (13)	0
**Tian Pengfei (CHN)**	**4**
**Amine Amiri (MAR)**	**4**
Adam Ashley (ENG)	3
**Martin Gould (ENG)**	**4**
Mark Davis (ENG)	2
Kishan Hirani (WAL)	0
**Zhou Yuelong (CHN)**	**4**
**Mark Williams (WAL) (4)**	**4**
Kacper Filipiak (POL)	3

Last 64; Best of 7 frames
(England) Mark King	1
**(Scotland) Scott Donaldson**	**4**
(Iran) Soheil Vahedi	0
**(China) Tian Pengfei**	**4**
(Morocco) Amine Amiri	0
**(England) Martin Gould**	**4**
(China) Zhou Yuelong	2
**(Wales) Mark Williams (4)**	**4**

Last 32; Best of 7 frames
(Scotland) Scott Donaldson	2
**(China) Tian Pengfei**	**4**
(England) Martin Gould	1
**(Wales) Mark Williams (4)**	**4**

Last 16; Best of 7 frames
(China) Tian Pengfei	3
**(Wales) Mark Williams (4)**	**4**

=== Bottom half ===
==== Section 5 ====
Last 128; Best of 7 frames
Neil Robertson (AUS) (3)	w/d
**Rory McLeod (ENG)**	**w/o**
**Louis Heathcote (ENG)**	**4**
John Astley (ENG)	1
Peter Lines (ENG)	2
**Andrew Higginson (ENG)**	**4**
Simon Lichtenberg (GER)	0
**Elliot Slessor (ENG)**	**4**
**Joe Perry (ENG) (14)**	**4**
Gareth Lopez (GIB)	0
**Lei Peifan (CHN)**	**4**
Peter Devlin (ENG)	1
**Jimmy Robertson (ENG)**	**4**
Ricky Walden (ENG)	0
**Craig Steadman (ENG)**	**4**
Michael White (WAL)	2

Last 64; Best of 7 frames
**(England) Rory McLeod**	**4**
(England) Louis Heathcote	2
(England) Andrew Higginson	3
**(England) Elliot Slessor**	**4**
**(England) Joe Perry (14)**	**4**
(China) Lei Peifan	1
**(England) Jimmy Robertson**	**4**
(England) Craig Steadman	2

Last 32; Best of 7 frames
**(England) Rory McLeod**	**4**
(England) Elliot Slessor	1
(England) Joe Perry (14)	3
**(England) Jimmy Robertson**	**4**

Last 16; Best of 7 frames
(England) Rory McLeod	1
**(England) Jimmy Robertson**	**4**

==== Section 6 ====
Last 128; Best of 7 frames
Michael Georgiou (CYP)	1
**Tom Ford (ENG)**	**4**
Ian Burns (ENG)	3
**Alfie Burden (ENG)**	**4**
Kurt Maflin (NOR)	w/d
**Hossein Vafaei (IRN)**	**w/o**
**Jack Lisowski (ENG) (11)**	**4**
Jordan Brown (NIR)	2
**Xiao Guodong (CHN)**	**4**
Robert Milkins (ENG)	0
Mike Dunn (ENG)	w/d
**Yuan Sijun (CHN)**	**w/o**
**Ryan Day (WAL)**	**4**
Luo Honghao (CHN)	1
John Higgins (SCO) (6)	w/d
**Lu Ning (CHN)**	**w/o**

Last 64; Best of 7 frames
**(England) Tom Ford**	**4**
(England) Alfie Burden	2
(Iran) Hossein Vafaei	0
**(England) Jack Lisowski (11)**	**4**
**(China) Xiao Guodong**	**4**
(China) Yuan Sijun	1
(Wales) Ryan Day	3
**(China) Lu Ning**	**4**

Last 32; Best of 7 frames
**(England) Tom Ford**	**4**
(England) Jack Lisowski (11)	2
**(China) Xiao Guodong**	**4**
(China) Lu Ning	1

Last 16; Best of 7 frames
(England) Tom Ford	2
**(China) Xiao Guodong**	**4**

==== Section 7 ====
Last 128; Best of 7 frames
Mark Allen (NIR) (7)	w/d
**Michael Holt (ENG)**	**w/o**
Dominic Dale (WAL)	1
**Jackson Page (WAL)**	**4**
Billy Joe Castle (ENG)	1
**Sam Craigie (ENG)**	**4**
Andy Hicks (ENG)	2
**Ashley Hugill (ENG)**	**4**
**Barry Hawkins (ENG) (10)**	**4**
Sybren Sokolowski (BEL)	0
**Liang Wenbo (CHN)**	**4**
James Cahill (ENG)	3
Andy Lee (HKG)	1
**Zhao Xintong (CHN)**	**4**
**Jamie Clarke (WAL)**	**4**
Chen Feilong (CHN)	1

Last 64; Best of 7 frames
**(England) Michael Holt**	**4**
(Wales) Jackson Page	0
(England) Sam Craigie	0
**(England) Ashley Hugill**	**4**
(England) Barry Hawkins (10)	3
**(China) Liang Wenbo**	**4**
**(China) Zhao Xintong**	**4**
(Wales) Jamie Clarke	0

Last 32; Best of 7 frames
(England) Michael Holt	1
**(England) Ashley Hugill**	**4**
**(China) Liang Wenbo**	**4**
(China) Zhao Xintong	1

Last 16; Best of 7 frames
(England) Ashley Hugill	2
**(China) Liang Wenbo**	**4**

==== Section 8 ====
Last 128; Best of 7 frames
**Mark Joyce (ENG)**	**4**
Adam Stefanow (POL)	2
Hammad Miah (ENG)	3
**Xu Si (CHN)**	**4**
**Li Hang (CHN)**	**4**
Alex Borg (MLT)	1
Ali Carter (ENG) (15)	w/d
**Jamie O'Neill (ENG)**	**w/o**
**Daniel Wells (WAL)**	**w/o**
Graeme Dott (SCO)	w/d
**Martin O'Donnell (ENG)**	**4**
Eden Sharav (ISR)	1
**Igor Figueiredo (BRA)**	**4**
Matthew Selt (ENG)	1
**Judd Trump (ENG) (2)**	**4**
Lee Prickman (GIB)	0

Last 64; Best of 7 frames
**(England) Mark Joyce**	**4**
(China) Xu Si	3
**(China) Li Hang**	**4**
(England) Jamie O'Neill	1
(Wales) Daniel Wells	3
**(England) Martin O'Donnell**	**4**
(Brazil) Igor Figueiredo	2
**(England) Judd Trump (2)**	**4**

Last 32; Best of 7 frames
(England) Mark Joyce	3
**(China) Li Hang**	**4**
(England) Martin O'Donnell	1
**(England) Judd Trump (2)**	**4**

Last 16; Best of 7 frames
(China) Li Hang	1
**(England) Judd Trump (2)**	**4**

=== Finals ===
**Quarter-finals**; Best of 7 frames
(Thailand) Thepchaiya Un-Nooh	0
**(England) Kyren Wilson (8)**	**4**
(England) David Grace	1
**(Wales) Mark Williams (4)**	**4**
(England) Jimmy Robertson	3
**(China) Xiao Guodong**	**4**
(China) Liang Wenbo	1
**(England) Judd Trump (2)**	**4**

**Semi-finals**; Best of 7 frames
**(England) Kyren Wilson (8)**	**4**
(Wales) Mark Williams (4)	0
(China) Xiao Guodong	3
**(England) Judd Trump (2)**	**4**

**Final**; Best of 7 frames
(England) Kyren Wilson (8)	3
**(England) Judd Trump (2)**	**4**

=== Final ===
Final: Best of 7 frames. Referee: Monika Sułkowska; Europa Point Sports Complex, Gibraltar, 15 March 2020
Kyren Wilson (8); England	3–**4**	**Judd Trump** (2); England
Frames: 1–**125** (125), **115**–17 (115), 0–**144** (144), **76**–57, **75**–61, 0–**123** (123), 1–**115**
115	Highest break	**144**
1	Century breaks	**3**

== Qualifying ==
Qualifying for the event featuring amateur players took place in Gibraltar on 11 and 12 March 2020. There were a total of four rounds with all matches being played as the best-of-5 frames.

=== Round 1 ===
(Spain) Salvador Pérez Carrascal	w/o–w/d	(Morocco) Faggane El Mehdi
(England) Imran Puri	0–3	(Wales) Callum Lloyd
(England) James Height	2–3	(England) Nick Jennings
(Scotland) Dylan Craig	3–0	(England) James Welch
(England) Jason Tart	w/d–w/o	(Republic of Ireland) Leo Fernandez
(Spain) David Moreno Garcia	w/d–w/o	(England) Andrew Urbaniak
(England) Matthew Glasby	3–2	(England) Paul Gibbs
(England) Adam Egde	0–3	(England) Oliver Brown
(England) Danny Brindle	0–3	(England) Allan Taylor
(Spain) Roberto Juan Garcia	w/d–w/o	(Wales) Andrew Pagett
(Scotland) Andy Fong	0–3	(England) Jack Smithers
(Spain) Tinaut Fernández	w/d–w/o	(England) David Finbow
(England) Alfred Sims	1–3	(Republic of Ireland) Dessie Sheehan
(Spain) Angel Garcia	w/o–w/d	(Portugal) Filipe Cardoso
(Morocco) Yassine Zaraoni	3–0	(England) David Church
(Republic of Ireland) Paul Ludden	0–3	(England) Dale Prime
(England) James Budd	3–0	(England) Curtis Daher
(England) Adam Johnston	w/o–w/d	(Thailand) Nutcharut Wongharuthai
(Morocco) Hamid Mabchour	3–1	(Spain) John Skellett
(Thailand) Suchakree Poomjang	w/d–w/o	(Republic of Ireland) Tony Corrigan
(Spain) Alex Calin	w/d–w/o	(Gibraltar) Francis Becerra
(England) Patrick Whelan	w/o–w/d	(Singapore) Benny Loh Siang Leng
(Pakistan) Yasir Nadeem	w/d–w/o	(Bahrain) Nader Aldosari
(Bulgaria) Ivelin Bozhanov	3–0	(England) Jonathan Noble

(Kenya) Martin Kihato	w/d–w/o	(Belgium) Daan Leysen
(Germany) Daniel Schneider	w/d–w/o	(England) Adam Ashley
(Spain) Angel Marchena	1–3	(England) Macauley Croft
(Gibraltar) Andrew Olivero	w/o–w/d	(Iran) Morteza Torabi
(England) Rory McLeod	3–0	(England) Andrew Milliard
(Japan) Keishin Kamihashi	w/o–w/d	(Hong Kong) Ken Ng
(Portugal) Francisco Domingues	w/o–w/d	(Spain) Arturo Santamaria
(Spain) Pablo Toharia	1–3	(England) Sean McAllister
(England) Rishi Gohill	0–3	(England) Mike Finn
(Morocco) Souhail Rami	w/o–w/d	(England) Lee Adams
(England) Paul Burrell	3–1	(England) Ronnie Blake
(Scotland) Barry Lee	w/d–w/o	(England) John Nicholson
(England) Hussain Shah	w/d–w/o	(England) Peter Devlin
(England) Adam Duffy	w/d–w/o	(Germany) Kharazchi Jamshid
(Northern Ireland) Gee Crawley	3–1	(England) Barry Stark
(England) Steve Crowley	w/o–w/d	(Turkey) Tugba Irten
(England) Ashley Hugill	3–2	(England) Adam Nash
(England) Joshua Mallender	3–0	(Germany) Heiko Mutz
(Morocco) Jadouri Aboulkacem	w/d–w/o	(England) Mark Winsor
(England) Garry Coulson	0–3	(Belgium) Sybren Sokolowski
(India) Saif Uddin	w/o–w/d	(England) Damian Wilks
(England) Billy Brown	w/d–w/o	(England) Mark Vincent
(England) Ian Martin	3–0	(England) Steven Breward

=== Round 2 ===
(Brazil) Fernando Silva	w/d–w/o	(Spain) Salvador Pérez Carrascal
(England) Nigel Howes	1–3	(Wales) Callum Lloyd
(England) Antony Rodriguez	w/d–w/o	(England) Nick Jennings
(Gibraltar) Kyle Dixon	0–3	(Scotland) Dylan Craig
(Republic of Ireland) Leo Fernandez	3–0	(England) Andrew Urbaniak
(England) Aran Hetherington	2–3	(England) Matthew Glasby
(Morocco) Hicham Baraka	w/d–w/o	(England) Oliver Brown
(England) Ferdous Bhuiyan	0–3	(England) Allan Taylor
(Wales) Andrew Pagett	3–2	(England) Jack Smithers
(Morocco) Idriss El Mokri	w/d–w/o	(England) David Finbow
(Germany) Leonard Sinden	1–3	(Republic of Ireland) Dessie Sheehan
(England) Anton Thorley	w/d–w/o	(Spain) Angel Garcia
(Gibraltar) Adrian Holmes	1–3	(Morocco) Yassine Zaraoni
(Morocco) Mehdi Jeoual	w/d–w/o	(England) Dale Prime
(England) James Budd	w/o–w/d	(England) Adam Johnston
(Morocco) Ameur Riad	3–0	(Morocco) Hamid Mabchour
(Republic of Ireland) Tony Corrigan	3–0	(Gibraltar) Francis Becerra
(Bahrain) Raheem Ahmed	w/d–w/o	(England) Patrick Whelan
(Germany) Marc Pantenburg	w/o–w/d	(Bahrain) Nader Aldosari
(Iceland) Kristján Helgason	3–0	(Bulgaria) Ivelin Bozhanov

(India) Hitesh Sillara	w/d–w/o	(Belgium) Daan Leyssen
(England) Jaymie Thornbury	2–3	(England) Adam Ashley
(England) Brett Armer	3–1	(England) Macauley Croft
(England) Ian White	0–3	(Gibraltar) Andrew Olivero
(Spain) Juan Pedro Durán	0–3	(England) Rory McLeod
(India) Mohd Majeed Saleem	w/o–w/d	(Japan) Keishin Kamihashi
(Republic of Ireland) Kevin Kelly	1–3	(Portugal) Francisco Domingues
(England) Jak Turnbull	w/d–w/o	(England) Sean McAllister
(Spain) Jesus Garcia Roldan	0–3	(England) Mike Finn
(Morocco) Mostafa El Younssi	w/d–w/o	(Morocco) Souheil Rami
(England) Paul Burrell	1–3	(England) John Nicholson
(Morocco) Saad Elantri	w/d–w/o	(England) Peter Devlin
(India) Muzakkir Ahamed Javeed	w/d–w/o	(Germany) Kharazchi Jamshid
(Northern Ireland) Kyle Kirkwood	0–3	(Northern Ireland) Gee Crawley
(England) Steve Crowley	1–3	(England) Ashley Hugill
(England) Peter Geronimo	0–3	(England) Joshua Mallender
(Morocco) Yassine Bellamine	w/d–w/o	(England) Mark Winsor
(England) Farhan Choudry	w/d–w/o	(Belgium) Sybren Sokolowski
(India) Saif Uddin	w/d–w/o	(England) Mark Vincent
(Spain) Javier González	w/d–w/o	(England) Ian Martin

=== Round 3 ===
(Spain) Salvador Pérez Carrascal	w/d–w/o	(Wales) Callum Lloyd
(England) Nick Jennings	0–3	(Scotland) Dylan Craig
(Republic of Ireland) Leo Fernandez	2–3	(England) Matthew Glasby
(England) Oliver Brown	0–3	(England) Allan Taylor
(Wales) Andrew Pagett	3–2	(England) David Finbow
(Republic of Ireland) Dessie Sheehan	3–2	(Spain) Angel Garcia
(Morocco) Yassine Zaraoni	2–3	(England) Dale Prime
(England) James Budd	0–3	(Morocco) Ameur Riad
(Republic of Ireland) Tony Corrigan	0–3	(England) Patrick Whelan
(Germany) Marc Pantenburg	0–3	(Iceland) Kristján Helgason

(Belgium) Daan Leyssen	1–3	(England) Adam Ashley
(England) Brett Armer	0–3	(Gibraltar) Andrew Olivero
(England) Rory McLeod	w/o–w/d	(India) Mohd Majeed Saleem
(Portugal) Francisco Domingues	0–3	(England) Sean McAllister
(England) Mike Finn	w/o–w/d	(Morocco) Souheil Rami
(England) John Nicholson	0–3	(England) Peter Devlin
(Germany) Kharazchi Jamshid	0–3	(Northern Ireland) Gee Crawley
(England) Ashley Hugill	3–0	(England) Joshua Mallender
(England) Mark Winsor	2–3	(Belgium) Sybren Sokolowski
(England) Mark Vincent	0–3	(England) Ian Martin

=== Round 4 ===
(Wales) Callum Lloyd	0–3	(Scotland) Dylan Craig
(England) Matthew Glasby	1–3	(England) Allan Taylor
(Wales) Andrew Pagett	3–0	(Republic of Ireland) Dessie Sheehan
(England) Dale Prime	2–3	(Morocco) Ameur Riad
(England) Patrick Whelan	0–3	(Iceland) Kristján Helgason

(England) Adam Ashley	3–0	(Gibraltar) Andrew Olivero
(England) Rory McLeod	3–1	(England) Sean McAllister
(England) Mike Finn	1–3	(England) Peter Devlin
(Northern Ireland) Gee Crawley	1–3	(England) Ashley Hugill
(Belgium) Sybren Sokolowski	3–1	(England) Ian Martin

== Century breaks ==
=== Main stage centuries ===
A total of 63 century breaks were made during the tournament. Judd Trump made the highest break of the event, a 144, in frame three of the final against Kyren Wilson.

- 144, 132, 125, 123, 123, 113, 111, 104, 103 – Judd Trump
- 143 – Jack Lisowski
- 141, 104 – Tom Ford
- 139, 137, 127 – Fergal O'Brien
- 139 – Sam Craigie
- 138, 101 – Mark Selby
- 137, 116 – Ryan Day
- 137, 101 – Tian Pengfei
- 136 – Mitchell Mann
- 133, 114, 113 – Liang Wenbo
- 129, 124 – Chang Bingyu
- 128 – Thepchaiya Un-Nooh
- 127, 110 – Luca Brecel
- 126, 125, 103 – Elliot Slessor
- 123, 118 – Rod Lawler
- 123, 116, 100, 100 – Xiao Guodong
- 122, 120 – Zhao Xintong
- 118 – Zhou Yuelong
- 115, 107 – Kyren Wilson
- 112 – Ian Burns
- 110, 109 – Stuart Bingham
- 110, 107, 106 – Jimmy Robertson
- 110 – Michael Holt
- 108, 107 – Barry Hawkins
- 108, 105 – Mark Joyce
- 105 – Li Hang
- 104, 103, 100 – Lyu Haotian
- 101 – Igor Figueiredo
- 101 – Robbie Williams
- 101 – Yuan Sijun
