= Amine Amiri =

Moroccan snooker player

Personal information
- Born: 30 March 1994 (age 32)

Sport
- Country: Morocco
- Sport: Snooker
- Professional: 2019–2021
- Highest ranking: 95 (September 2020)
- Best ranking finish: Last 64 (2020 Gibraltar Open)
Medal record
Snooker
Representing Morocco
African Games
| Gold medal – first place | 2019 Casablanca | Individual |
| Silver medal – second place | 2019 Casablanca | Mixed doubles |

Amine Amiri (born 30 March 1994) is a former professional Moroccan snooker player.

== Career ==
Amiri played on the World Snooker Tour for the first time in 2019–20, after winning a gold medal in the African Games. His first match as a professional came in the 2019 English Open where in the first round he lost 4–0 to Barry Hawkins.

Barring a second round exit in the 2020 Gibraltar Open, he exited in the first round of every tournament he entered over his two-year tour card. He also drew Judd Trump twice during his debut season, being whitewasted in both instances. With only one win to his name, he fell off the tour after the 2020-21 season and did not attempt to regain his tour card via the 2021 Q School.

== Performance and rankings timeline ==
| Tournament | 2019/ 20 | 2020/ 21 |
|---|---|---|
| Ranking | (Note: New players on the Main Tour don't have a ranking.) | 95 |
Ranking tournaments
| European Masters | A | 1R |
| English Open | 1R | 1R |
| Championship League | NR | RR |
| Northern Ireland Open | A | 1R |
| UK Championship | 1R | 1R |
| Scottish Open | 1R | 1R |
| World Grand Prix | DNQ | DNQ |
| German Masters | A | LQ |
| Shoot-Out | 1R | WD |
| Welsh Open | 1R | WD |
| Players Championship | DNQ | DNQ |
| Gibraltar Open | 2R | WD |
| WST Pro Series | NH | WD |
| Tour Championship | DNQ | DNQ |
| World Championship | LQ | WD |

Performance Table Legend
| LQ | lost in the qualifying draw | #R | lost in the early rounds of the tournament (WR = Wildcard round, RR = Round robin) | QF | lost in the quarter-finals |
| SF | lost in the semi-finals | F | lost in the final | W | won the tournament |
| DNQ | did not qualify for the tournament | A | did not participate in the tournament | WD | withdrew from the tournament |

| NH / Not Held | means an event was not held. |
| NR / Non-Ranking Event | means an event is/was no longer a ranking event. |
| R / Ranking Event | means an event is/was a ranking event. |
| MR / Minor-Ranking Event | means an event is/was a minor-ranking event. |
