= Riley Parsons =

English snooker player (born 2000)

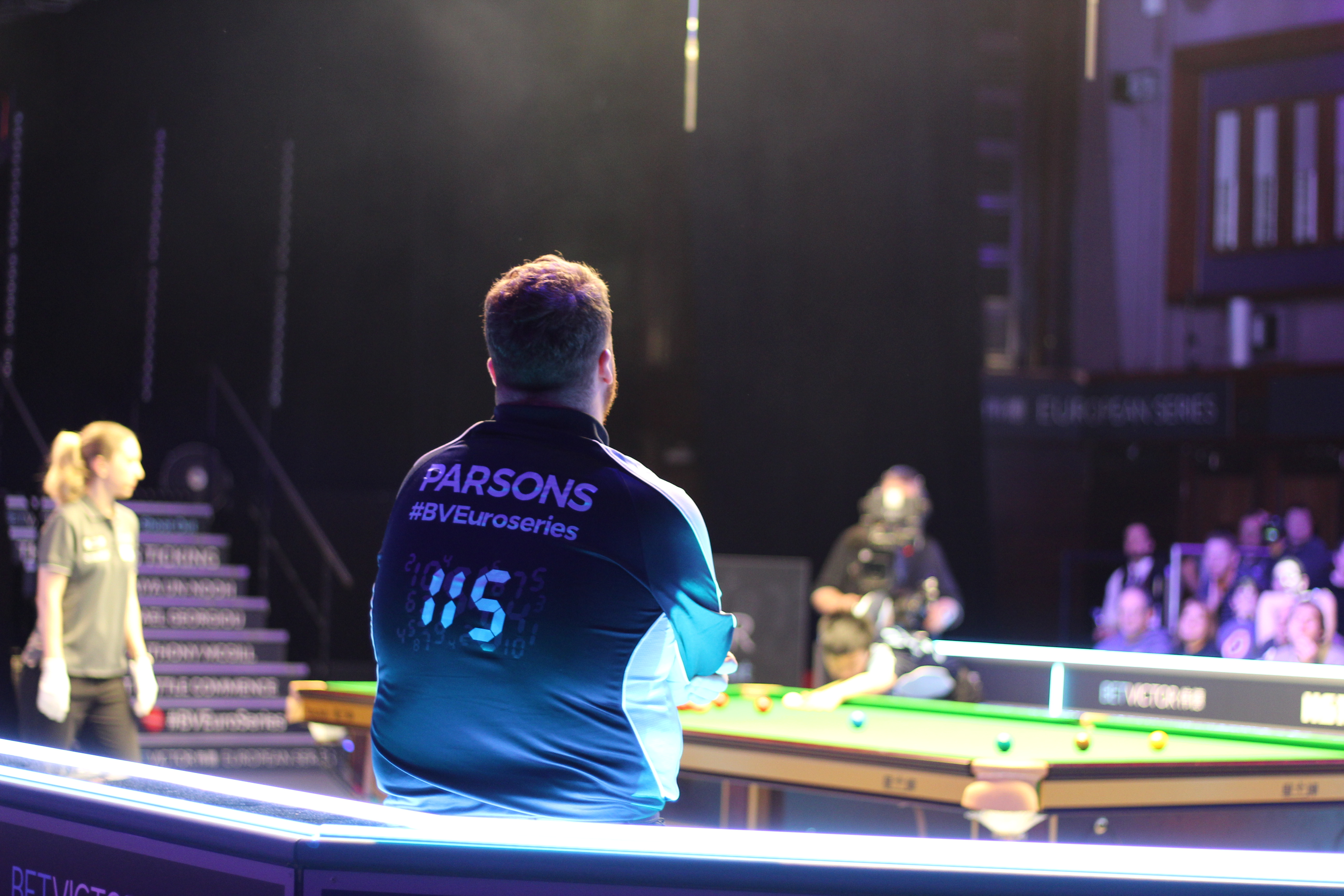
- Parsons in action at BetVictor Snooker Shootout

Personal information
- Born: 5 May 2000 (age 26) Cannock, Staffordshire

Sport
- Country: England
- Sport: Snooker
- Professional: 2019–2021
- Highest ranking: 98 (September 2020)
- Best ranking finish: Last 64 (x3)

Riley Parsons (born 5 May 2000) is an English former professional snooker player.

== Career ==
As an amateur Parsons represented England at the 2018 EBSA European men's championship in Sofia Bulgaria.

Parsons turned professional for the first time in 2019 after progressing from Q School Event Two in Wigan.

The Englishman, who hails from Cannock, defeated Alexander Ursenbacher, Daniel Womersley, Chae Ross, Callum Lloyd and finally Peter Lines to earn a two-year tour card from the start of the 2019/20 World Snooker Tour.

He was not able to win a match his whole first season on tour. However, Parsons did win his opening match for the 2020–21 season, with a 5–4 win over Soheil Vahedi at the 2020 European Masters.

Parsons was relegated from the tour at the end of the 2020-21 season.

== Personal life ==
Parsons was born in Cannock, Staffordshire.

Parsons has a daughter called Ivy-Mae, who was born in 2021.

== Performance and rankings timeline ==
Tournament	2019/ 20	2020/ 21
Ranking (Note: It shows the ranking at the beginning of the season)	(Note: New players don't have a ranking)	98
Ranking tournaments
European Masters	LQ	2R
English Open	1R	1R
Championship League	NR	RR
Northern Ireland Open	1R	WD
UK Championship	1R	1R
Scottish Open	1R	1R
World Grand Prix	DNQ	DNQ
German Masters	LQ	WD
Shoot Out	1R	2R
Welsh Open	1R	1R
Players Championship	DNQ	DNQ
Gibraltar Open	1R	1R
WST Pro Series	NH	RR
Tour Championship	DNQ	DNQ
World Championship	LQ	LQ
Former ranking tournaments
Riga Masters	LQ	NH
International Championship	LQ	NH
China Championship	LQ	NH
World Open	LQ	NH

Performance Table Legend
LQ	lost in the qualifying draw	#R	lost in the early rounds of the tournament (WR = Wildcard round, RR = Round robin)	QF	lost in the quarter-finals
SF	lost in the semi-finals	F	lost in the final	W	won the tournament
DNQ	did not qualify for the tournament	A	did not participate in the tournament	WD	withdrew from the tournament

NH / Not Held	means an event was not held
NR / Non-Ranking Event	means an event is/was no longer a ranking event
R / Ranking Event	means an event is/was a ranking event
MR / Minor-Ranking Event	means an event is/was a minor-ranking event

== Career finals ==
=== Amateur finals: 4 (3 titles) ===
Outcome	No.	Year	Championship	Opponent in the final	Score
Winner	1.	2022	EPSB Open Series - Landywood - Event 1 (2022/23)	(England) Jack Harris	3–2
Winner	2.	2023	EPSB Open Series - Landywood - Event 6 (2022/23)	(England) Lee Shanker	3–2
Runner-up	1.	2023	EPSB Open Series - Play-Off (2022/23)	(England) Daniel Womersley	1–3
Winner	3.	2023	EPSB Open Series - Landywood - Event 2 (2023/24)	(England) Tom Maxfield	3–0
