= 2019 UK Championship =

Snooker tournament

2019 Betway UK Championship

Tournament information
- Dates: 26 November – 8 December 2019
- Venue: Barbican Centre
- City: York
- Country: England
- Organisation: World Snooker
- Format: Ranking event
- Total prize fund: £1,009,000
- Winner's share: £200,000
- Highest break: Barry Hawkins (ENG) (147)

Final
- Champion: Ding Junhui (CHN)
- Runner-up: Stephen Maguire (SCO)
- Score: 10–6

The 2019 UK Championship (officially the 2019 Betway UK Championship) was a professional snooker tournament that took place from 26 November to 8 December 2019 in the Barbican Centre, York, England. The 43rd edition of the UK Championship, it was the seventh ranking tournament and the first Triple Crown event of the 2019–20 season. The event was broadcast on BBC Sport in the United Kingdom and on Eurosport throughout Europe. The tournament was sponsored by betting company Betway.

The defending champion, Ronnie O'Sullivan, had won the previous two championships, defeating Shaun Murphy 10–5 in the 2017 final, and Mark Allen 10–6 in the 2018 final. O'Sullivan was eliminated in the last 16 by Ding Junhui, who won the match 6–4 and proceeded to reach the final of the event, defeating compatriots Liang Wenbo and Yan Bingtao, both 6–2, in the two intervening rounds. Ding's opponent in the final was Stephen Maguire, who had won his semi-final 6–0 against Mark Allen. Ding defeated Maguire 10–6 to win his third UK championship.

Barry Hawkins compiled a maximum break in the fourth frame of his first round match with Gerard Greene. It was the first maximum break to be made at the UK Championship since 2016, and the third of Hawkins' career. There were a total of 139 century breaks in the event.

== Overview ==
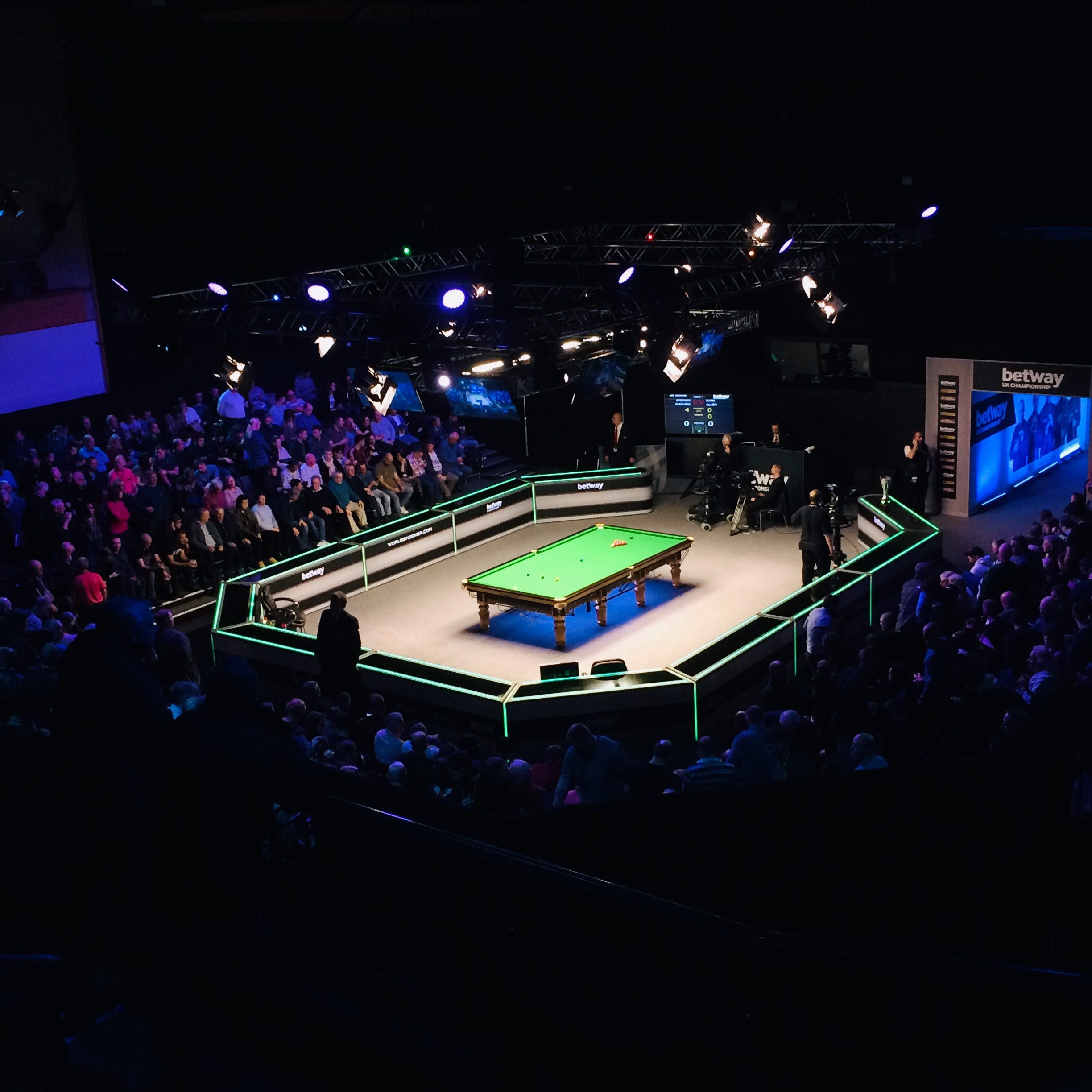
The setup inside the York Barbican during the event

The 2019 UK Championship took place between 26 November and 8 December 2019 at the York Barbican, York, England. It was the 11th ranking event of the 2019–20 snooker season, and the first Triple Crown event of the season. All 128 players from the World Snooker Tour participated. Every match, except for the final, was played over a maximum of 11 frames, and the final was held over two sessions as a best-of-19-frames match. The first round of the competition started on 26 November, with players seeded according to their world rankings.

The defending champion, Ronnie O'Sullivan, had won the previous two UK championships, having defeated Shaun Murphy 10–5 in the 2017 final, and Mark Allen 10–6 in the 2018 final. O'Sullivan was seeded first, as defending champion, ahead of world number one Judd Trump. The tournament was broadcast live in the United Kingdom by BBC Sport, and shown on Eurosport in Europe. Worldwide, the event was covered by China Central Television and Superstars Online in China, and by Sky Sports in New Zealand. It was simulcast in Hong Kong by Now TV with additional commentary; DAZN covered the event across Canada, Brazil and the United States.

=== Prize fund ===
The total prize fund for the event was more than £1,000,000 for the first time, the winner receiving £200,000. The breakdown of prize money is shown below:

- Winner: £200,000
- Runner-up: £80,000
- Semi-final: £40,000
- Quarter-final: £24,500
- Last 16: £17,000
- Last 32: £12,000
- Last 64: £6,500
- Highest break: £15,000
- Total: £1,009,000

== Summary ==
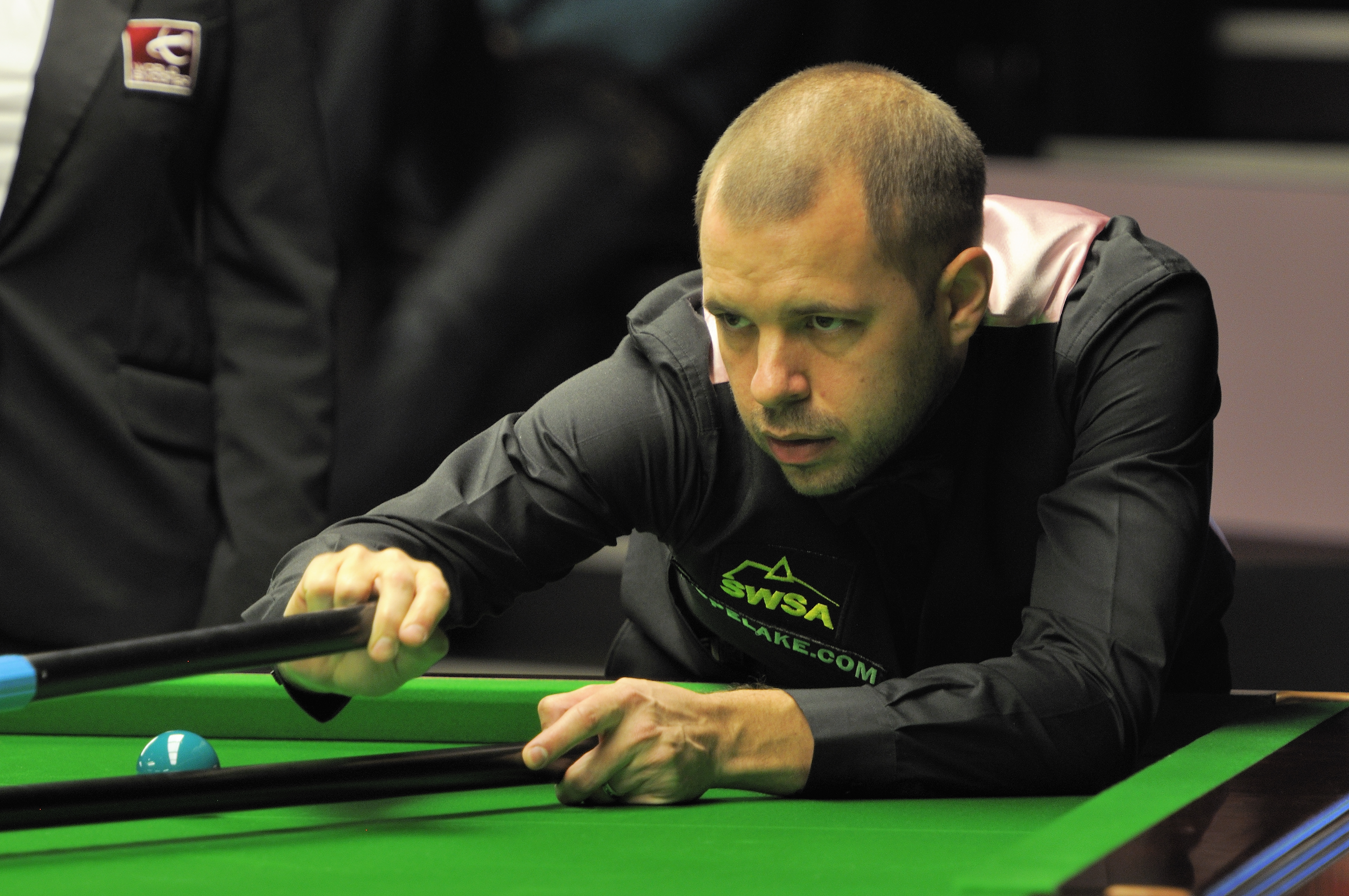
Barry Hawkins made a maximum break in his first-round win over Gerard Greene.

The 2019 UK Championship began with the opening round from 26 November. World number eight Shaun Murphy lost to Israeli player Eden Sharav 4–6. Murphy had led the match 3–1, before Sharav won five of the next six frames to win the match. World number 118 James Cahill defeated world number 11 David Gilbert 6–4. Gilbert commented after the match that there were "no positives" from the match, and he wanted to "smash up [his] cue". Barry Hawkins compiled the highest break of the tournament, when he made a maximum break in the fourth frame of his 6–2 win over Gerard Greene. Kyren Wilson completed a 6–0 whitewash win over Riley Parsons, whilst Mark Williams defeated Fraser Patrick 6–2, despite calling his own performance "awful".

Two-time winner Mark Williams was defeated in the second round by Michael White. World number nine Kyren Wilson was defeated by world number 56 Marco Fu in a deciding frame 5–6. In the third round, world number one Judd Trump was defeated by 54-year-old Nigel Bond 3–6. Bond trailed 1–3 early in the match, but won five straight frames to win the match. Trump had been attempting to hold all three Triple Crown events simultaneously, having won the Masters tournament and the World Championship earlier in the year. Ranked 98th in the world, Bond also progressed to the quarter-finals after defeating Gary Wilson 6–5, having trailed 2–5. Defending champion Ronnie O'Sullivan met Ding Junhui in the last 16, but failed to pot a ball in the first three frames. However, O'Sullivan made back-to-back century breaks to tie the match at 4–4, before Ding took the final two frames to win 6–4.

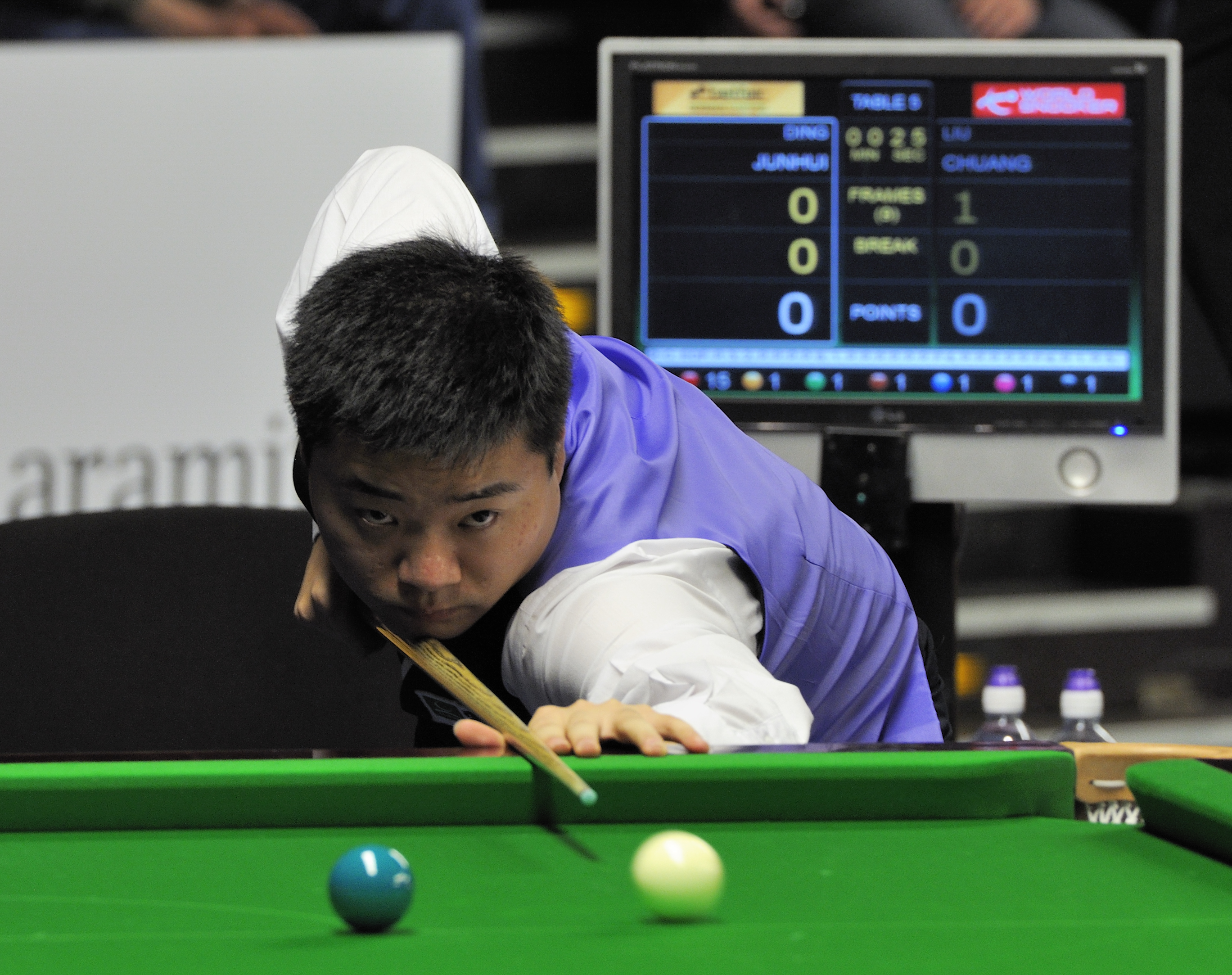
Ding Junhui won the tournament for the third time, defeating Stephen Maguire 10–6.

Having last reached the quarter-finals 16 years previously, Nigel Bond met Mark Allen. Bond led 3–1, but Allen won the next three frames, before Bond tied the match twice to force a deciding frame. Allen won the decider, but commented that the match table was "probably the worst I have played on as a professional". Stephen Maguire, who was still recovering from a fractured foot from October, defeated Matthew Stevens 6–4. Teenager Yan Bingtao defeated three-time champion John Higgins 6–3 despite not making a break over 50. Ding Junhui defeated fellow Chinese player Liang Wenbo in the last quarter-final 6–2. In the semi-finals, Ding defeated Yan Bingtao 6–2, with Yan only making one break over 50. In the other semi-final, Maguire completed a 6–0 whitewash win over Allen in just 89 minutes. Post match, Allen commented that he was "a bit shell-shocked" by the result and that Maguire "played superbly from start to finish. He went for his shots, was aggressive and looked like he wanted it. If he plays like that, he will definitely beat Ding."

The final was played as the best of 19 frames on 8 December. Stephen Maguire had won the event previously in 2004 and had again reached the final in 2007, but had not won a ranking event since the 2013 Welsh Open. His opponent Ding Junhui had won the event in both 2005 and 2009, but had also not won a ranking event in the prior two years. Ding won the first four frames of the match, including two century breaks, before Maguire won the next three. Ding won the eighth frame to lead 5–3 at the end of the session, before winning the next two frames to lead 7–3. Maguire took frame 11 after a fluke but Ding won the next with a break of 67. Frame 13 went to Maguire who made a century break after Ding missed a pot on the black ball, and Maguire made another century in frame 14. However, Ding made a century break of his own in frame 15 to lead 9–6 and won the match in frame 16 with his fourth century of the final. This was Ding's third UK Championship title, his first in ten years.

== Tournament draw ==
The results of the event are shown below. The winners of each match are indicated in bold.

=== Top half ===
==== Section 1 ====
Last 128; Best of 11 frames
1	**Ronnie O'Sullivan (ENG)**	**6**
A	Ross Bulman (IRL)	0
64	Sam Craigie (ENG)	4
65	**Tian Pengfei (CHN)**	**6**
32	**Noppon Saengkham (THA)**	**6**
97	Jackson Page (WAL)	5
33	**Anthony McGill (SCO)**	**6**
96	Mitchell Mann (ENG)	1
16	**Ding Junhui (CHN)**	**6**
113	Duane Jones (WAL)	2
49	**Michael Georgiou (CYP)**	**6**
80	Oliver Lines (ENG)	4
17	**Ali Carter (ENG)**	**6**
112	Brandon Sargeant (ENG)	0
48	**Robert Milkins (ENG)**	**6**
81	Harvey Chandler (ENG)	4

Last 64; Best of 11 frames
1	(England) **Ronnie O'Sullivan**	**6**
65	(China) Tian Pengfei	0
32	(Thailand) **Noppon Saengkham**	**6**
33	(Scotland) Anthony McGill	3
16	(China) **Ding Junhui**	**6**
49	(Cyprus) Michael Georgiou	2
17	(England) **Ali Carter**	**6**
48	(England) Robert Milkins	2

Last 32; Best of 11 frames
1	(England) **Ronnie O'Sullivan**	**6**
32	(Thailand) Noppon Saengkham	2
16	(China) **Ding Junhui**	**6**
17	(England) Ali Carter	4

Last 16; Best of 11 frames
1	(England) Ronnie O'Sullivan	4
16	(China) **Ding Junhui**	**6**

==== Section 2 ====
Last 128; Best of 11 frames
41	**Li Hang (CHN)**	**6**
88	Jamie Clarke (WAL)	1
24	**Xiao Guodong (CHN)**	**6**
105	Rod Lawler (ENG)	1
56	**Marco Fu (HKG)**	**6**
73	Craig Steadman (ENG)	3
9	**Kyren Wilson (ENG)**	**6**
120	Riley Parsons (ENG)	0
40	**Liang Wenbo (CHN)**	**6**
89	Dominic Dale (WAL)	5
25	Tom Ford (ENG)	3
104	**David Grace (ENG)**	**6**
57	**Daniel Wells (WAL)**	**6**
72	Zhang Anda (CHN)	3
8	Shaun Murphy (ENG)	4
121	**Eden Sharav (ISR)**	**6**

Last 64; Best of 11 frames
41	(China) **Li Hang**	**6**
24	(China) Xiao Guodong	4
56	(Hong Kong) **Marco Fu**	**6**
9	(England) Kyren Wilson	5
40	(China) **Liang Wenbo**	**6**
104	(England) David Grace	3
57	(Wales) Daniel Wells	2
121	(Israel) **Eden Sharav**	**6**

Last 32; Best of 11 frames
41	(China) **Li Hang**	**6**
56	(Hong Kong) Marco Fu	4
40	(China) **Liang Wenbo**	**6**
121	(Israel) Eden Sharav	4

Last 16; Best of 11 frames
41	(China) Li Hang	4
40	(China) **Liang Wenbo**	**6**

==== Section 3 ====
Last 128; Best of 11 frames
5	**John Higgins (SCO)**	**6**
124	Peter Lines (ENG)	0
60	**Lu Ning (CHN)**	**6**
69	Joe O'Connor (ENG)	0
28	Matthew Selt (ENG)	0
101	**Ian Burns (ENG)**	**6**
37	**Michael Holt (ENG)**	**6**
92	Adam Stefanow (POL)	1
12	**Stuart Bingham (ENG)**	**6**
117	Lei Peifan (CHN)	4
53	**Martin Gould (ENG)**	**6**
76	Alfie Burden (ENG)	4
21	**Thepchaiya Un-Nooh (THA)**	**6**
108	Jamie O'Neill (ENG)	5
44	**Zhao Xintong (CHN)**	**6**
85	Alexander Ursenbacher (SUI)	5

Last 64; Best of 11 frames
5	(Scotland) **John Higgins**	**6**
60	(China) Lu Ning	1
101	(England) **Ian Burns**	**6**
37	(England) Michael Holt	5
12	(England) **Stuart Bingham**	**6**
53	(England) Martin Gould	4
21	(Thailand) Thepchaiya Un-Nooh	4
44	(China) **Zhao Xintong**	**6**

Last 32; Best of 11 frames
5	(Scotland) **John Higgins**	**6**
101	(England) Ian Burns	1
12	(England) **Stuart Bingham**	**6**
44	(China) Zhao Xintong	1

Last 16; Best of 11 frames
5	(Scotland) **John Higgins**	**6**
12	(England) Stuart Bingham	4

==== Section 4 ====
Last 128; Best of 11 frames
45	**Stuart Carrington (ENG)**	**6**
84	James Wattana (THA)	3
20	**Yan Bingtao (CHN)**	**6**
109	Igor Figueiredo (BRA)	1
52	**Peter Ebdon (ENG)**	**6**
77	John Astley (ENG)	5
13	**Jack Lisowski (ENG)**	**6**
116	David Lilley (ENG)	2
36	**Mark King (ENG)**	**6**
93	Chang Bingyu (CHN)	5
29	**Lyu Haotian (CHN)**	**6**
100	Andy Lee (HKG)	1
61	**Robbie Williams (ENG)**	**6**
68	Luo Honghao (CHN)	3
4	**Neil Robertson (AUS)**	**6**
125	Alex Borg (MLT)	0

Last 64; Best of 11 frames
45	(England) Stuart Carrington	2
20	(China) **Yan Bingtao**	**6**
52	(England) Peter Ebdon	2
13	(England) **Jack Lisowski**	**6**
36	(England) **Mark King**	**6**
29	(China) Lyu Haotian	1
61	(England) Robbie Williams	4
4	(Australia) **Neil Robertson**	**6**

Last 32; Best of 11 frames
20	(China) **Yan Bingtao**	**6**
13	(England) Jack Lisowski	3
36	(England) Mark King	4
4	(Australia) **Neil Robertson**	**6**

Last 16; Best of 11 frames
20	(China) **Yan Bingtao**	**6**
4	(Australia) Neil Robertson	1

=== Bottom half ===
==== Section 5 ====
Last 128; Best of 11 frames
3	**Mark Williams (WAL)**	**6**
126	Fraser Patrick (SCO)	2
62	**Michael White (WAL)**	**6**
67	Fergal O'Brien (IRL)	2
30	Zhou Yuelong (CHN)	4
99	**Fan Zhengyi (CHN)**	**6**
35	**Mark Davis (ENG)**	**6**
94	Si Jiahui (CHN)	5
14	**Stephen Maguire (SCO)**	**6**
115	Billy Joe Castle (ENG)	4
51	Mark Joyce (ENG)	2
78	**Jordan Brown (NIR)**	**6**
19	**Graeme Dott (SCO)**	**6**
110	Barry Pinches (ENG)	1
46	**Yuan Sijun (CHN)**	**6**
83	Hammad Miah (ENG)	5

Last 64; Best of 11 frames
3	(Wales) Mark Williams	2
62	(Wales) **Michael White**	**6**
99	(China) Fan Zhengyi	4
35	(England) **Mark Davis**	**6**
14	(Scotland) **Stephen Maguire**	**6**
78	(Northern Ireland) Jordan Brown	2
19	(Scotland) **Graeme Dott**	**6**
46	(China) Yuan Sijun	0

Last 32; Best of 11 frames
62	(Wales) **Michael White**	**6**
35	(England) Mark Davis	5
14	(Scotland) **Stephen Maguire**	**6**
19	(Scotland) Graeme Dott	2

Last 16; Best of 11 frames
62	(Wales) Michael White	4
14	(Scotland) **Stephen Maguire**	**6**

==== Section 6 ====
Last 128; Best of 11 frames
43	**Matthew Stevens (WAL)**	**6**
86	Chen Feilong (CHN)	0
22	**Ryan Day (WAL)**	**6**
107	Soheil Vahedi (IRN)	3
54	**Anthony Hamilton (ENG)**	**6**
75	Sam Baird (ENG)	2
11	David Gilbert (ENG)	4
118	**James Cahill (ENG)**	**6**
38	**Martin O'Donnell (ENG)**	**6**
91	Kishan Hirani (WAL)	4
27	**Ricky Walden (ENG)**	**6**
102	Xu Si (CHN)	3
59	**Liam Highfield (ENG)**	**6**
70	Mike Dunn (ENG)	2
6	**Mark Selby (ENG)**	**6**
123	Andy Hicks (ENG)	0

Last 64; Best of 11 frames
43	(Wales) **Matthew Stevens**	**6**
22	(Wales) Ryan Day	5
54	(England) **Anthony Hamilton**	**6**
118	(England) James Cahill	3
38	(England) **Martin O'Donnell**	**6**
27	(England) Ricky Walden	2
59	(England) Liam Highfield	3
6	(England) **Mark Selby**	**6**

Last 32; Best of 11 frames
43	(Wales) **Matthew Stevens**	**6**
54	(England) Anthony Hamilton	2
38	(England) Martin O'Donnell	3
6	(England) **Mark Selby**	**6**

Last 16; Best of 11 frames
43	(Wales) **Matthew Stevens**	**6**
6	(England) Mark Selby	5

==== Section 7 ====
Last 128; Best of 11 frames
7	**Mark Allen (NIR)**	**6**
122	Jimmy White (ENG)	3
58	Andrew Higginson (ENG)	4
71	**Jak Jones (WAL)**	**6**
26	**Scott Donaldson (SCO)**	**6**
103	Chen Zifan (CHN)	1
39	**Ben Woollaston (ENG)**	**6**
90	Zhang Jiankang (CHN)	2
10	**Barry Hawkins (ENG)**	**6**
119	Gerard Greene (NIR)	2
55	**Alan McManus (SCO)**	**6**
74	Elliot Slessor (ENG)	1
23	**Jimmy Robertson (ENG)**	**6**
106	Kacper Filipiak (POL)	4
42	**Kurt Maflin (NOR)**	**6**
87	Thor Chuan Leong (MYS)	2

Last 64; Best of 11 frames
7	(Northern Ireland) **Mark Allen**	**6**
71	(Wales) Jak Jones	5
26	(Scotland) Scott Donaldson	4
39	(England) **Ben Woollaston**	**6**
10	(England) Barry Hawkins	4
55	(Scotland) **Alan McManus**	**6**
23	(England) Jimmy Robertson	2
42	(Norway) **Kurt Maflin**	**6**

Last 32; Best of 11 frames
7	(Northern Ireland) **Mark Allen**	**6**
39	(England) Ben Woollaston	1
55	(Scotland) Alan McManus	2
42	(Norway) **Kurt Maflin**	**6**

Last 16; Best of 11 frames
7	(Northern Ireland) **Mark Allen**	**6**
42	(Norway) Kurt Maflin	5

==== Section 8 ====
Last 128; Best of 11 frames
47	**Chris Wakelin (ENG)**	**6**
82	Ashley Carty (ENG)	3
18	**Gary Wilson (ENG)**	**6**
111	Bai Langning (CHN)	3
50	**Sunny Akani (THA)**	**6**
79	Lee Walker (WAL)	4
15	**Joe Perry (ENG)**	**6**
114	Simon Lichtenberg (GER)	5
34	Hossein Vafaei (IRN)	5
95	**Louis Heathcote (ENG)**	**6**
31	Luca Brecel (BEL)	5
98	**Nigel Bond (ENG)**	**6**
63	Ken Doherty (IRL)	4
66	**Mei Xiwen (CHN)**	**6**
2	**Judd Trump (ENG)**	**6**
127	Amine Amiri (MAR)	0

Last 64; Best of 11 frames
47	(England) Chris Wakelin	4
18	(England) **Gary Wilson**	**6**
50	(Thailand) Sunny Akani	3
15	(England) **Joe Perry**	**6**
95	(England) Louis Heathcote	5
98	(England) **Nigel Bond**	**6**
66	(China) Mei Xiwen	1
2	(England) **Judd Trump**	**6**

Last 32; Best of 11 frames
18	(England) **Gary Wilson**	**6**
15	(England) Joe Perry	1
98	(England) **Nigel Bond**	**6**
2	(England) Judd Trump	3

Last 16; Best of 11 frames
18	(England) Gary Wilson	5
98	(England) **Nigel Bond**	**6**

=== Finals ===
**Quarter-finals**; Best of 11 frames
16	(China) **Ding Junhui**	**6**
40	(China) Liang Wenbo	2
5	(Scotland) John Higgins	3
20	(China) **Yan Bingtao**	**6**
14	(Scotland) **Stephen Maguire**	**6**
43	(Wales) Matthew Stevens	4
7	(Northern Ireland) **Mark Allen**	**6**
98	(England) Nigel Bond	5

**Semi-finals**; Best of 11 frames
16	(China) **Ding Junhui**	**6**
20	(China) Yan Bingtao	2
14	(Scotland) **Stephen Maguire**	**6**
7	(Northern Ireland) Mark Allen	0

**Final**; Best of 19 frames
16	(China) **Ding Junhui**	**10**
14	(Scotland) Stephen Maguire	6

=== Final ===
Final: Best of 19 frames. Referee: Greg Coniglio; Barbican Centre, York, England, 8 December 2019.
**Ding Junhui** (16); China	**10**–6	Stephen Maguire (14); Scotland
Afternoon: **95**–38, **62**–23, **105**–16 (105), **128**–12 (128), 25–**93**, 49–**77**, 12–**76**, **67**–28; Evening: **83**–5, **73**–53, 0–**104** (103), **71**–27, 1–**104** (103), 0–**124** (124), **131**–0 (131), **114**–8 (114)
**131**	Highest break	124
**4**	Century breaks	3

== Century breaks ==
A total of 139 century breaks were made by 58 players during the championship. Barry Hawkins made the highest of the tournament, making a maximum break in his first round win over Gerard Greene. It was the first maximum break to be made at the UK Championship since 2016, and the third of Hawkins' career.

- 147 – Barry Hawkins
- 141, 129, 126 – Mark Allen
- 140 – Lu Ning
- 139, 100, 100 – Ali Carter
- 138 – Hossein Vafaei
- 137, 136, 131, 131, 119, 110 – Li Hang
- 136 – Alexander Ursenbacher
- 135, 129, 124, 123, 116, 115, 108, 106, 103, 103, 100 – Stephen Maguire
- 135, 127, 121, 111, 106 – Yan Bingtao
- 135, 107 – Matthew Stevens
- 134, 130 – Daniel Wells
- 134, 129, 114 – Mark Selby
- 134, 124, 121, 114, 103, 103, 100 – Gary Wilson
- 133, 124, 107, 106 – Ronnie O'Sullivan
- 133, 124, 102 – Mark Williams
- 133, 106, 105, 100 – Mark Davis
- 131, 128, 116, 110, 105, 104, 103, 103, 101, 100 – Ding Junhui
- 131, 104 – Anthony Hamilton
- 130, 102 – Martin O'Donnell
- 130 – James Cahill
- 129, 111, 101 – Michael Holt
- 128, 114 – Zhao Xintong
- 128, 113 – Kurt Maflin
- 127, 122, 106, 105, 100 – Stuart Bingham
- 127, 100 – Mei Xiwen
- 127 – Ryan Day
- 125, 114, 105 – Judd Trump
- 124, 123, 103 – John Higgins
- 124 – Luca Brecel
- 124 – Tom Ford
- 123 – Si Jiahui
- 120, 115, 104 – Ricky Walden
- 119 – Liam Highfield
- 118, 103 – Kacper Filipiak
- 117, 110, 104 – Marco Fu
- 117 – Xu Si
- 115, 113, 104 – Michael White
- 115 – David Grace
- 114, 113 – Nigel Bond
- 112, 107 – Alan McManus
- 107, 105, 101 – Neil Robertson
- 107, 102 – Jimmy Robertson
- 107 – Sam Baird
- 106, 105 – David Gilbert
- 105 – Martin Gould
- 104, 104, 102 – Jak Jones
- 104 – Sunny Akani
- 104 – Liang Wenbo
- 104 – Zhou Yuelong
- 103, 100 – Ian Burns
- 103 – Graeme Dott
- 102 – Anthony McGill
- 102 – Craig Steadman
- 102 – Zhang Jiankang
- 101 – Jordan Brown
- 101 – Noppon Saengkham
- 101 – Kyren Wilson
- 100 – Mark King
