= 2018 International Championship =

2018 OPPO International Championship
Tournament information
- Dates: 28 October – 4 November 2018
- Venue: Baihu Media Broadcasting Centre
- City: Daqing
- Country: China
- Organisation: World Snooker
- Format: Ranking event
- Total prize fund: £775,000
- Winner's share: £175,000
- Highest break: Mark Allen (NIR) (146)

Final
- Champion: Mark Allen (NIR)
- Runner-up: Neil Robertson (AUS)
- Score: 10–5

The 2018 International Championship (officially the 2018 OPPO International Championship) was a professional ranking snooker tournament, taking place from 28 October to 4 November 2018 in Daqing, China. It was the seventh ranking event of the 2018/2019 season.

Qualifying for the tournament took place between 9–12 October 2018 in Barnsley Metrodome, Barnsley.

Defending champion Mark Selby lost to Neil Robertson 4–6 in the quarter-final, bringing an end to his 2-year reign and an 18 match unbeaten record in the tournament.

Mark Allen won the tournament with record 14 century breaks, beating Robertson 10–5 in the final. It was Allen's fourth ranking title.

== Prize fund ==
The breakdown of prize money for this year is shown below:

- Winner: £175,000
- Runner-up: £75,000
- Semi-final: £32,000
- Quarter-final: £21,500
- Last 16: £13,500
- Last 32: £8,500
- Last 64: £4,000
- Televised highest break: £3,000
- Total: £775,000

The "rolling 147 prize" for a maximum break: £5,000

== Main draw ==
Last 64; Best of 11 frames
(England) Mark Selby	6
(Republic of Ireland) Ken Doherty	0
(England) Robert Milkins	6
(Thailand) Noppon Saengkham	2
(China) Liang Wenbo	4
(England) Ian Burns	6
(Scotland) Anthony McGill	4
(England) Stuart Carrington	6
(England) Mark Davis	3
(England) Joe Perry	6
(England) Matthew Selt	1
(Australia) Neil Robertson	6
(China) Fan Zhengyi	2
(China) Xiao Guodong	6
(China) Yuan Sijun	6
(England) Kyren Wilson	2
(England) Barry Hawkins	6
(Thailand) Thepchaiya Un-Nooh	2
(England) Martin Gould	6
(China) Li Hang	1
(Hong Kong) Marco Fu	6
(England) Andrew Higginson	5
(England) Jack Lisowski	6
(England) Chris Wakelin	1
(England) Jimmy White	0
(China) Yan Bingtao	6
(China) Tian Pengfei	3
(Wales) Ryan Day	6
(England) Michael Holt	6
(China) Luo Honghao	4
(Scotland) Alan McManus	0
(England) Judd Trump	6
(England) Peter Lines	4
(England) Martin O'Donnell	6
(England) Tom Ford	6
(England) Jimmy Robertson	3
(England) Stuart Bingham	3
(Israel) Eden Sharav	6
(England) David Gilbert	6
(England) John Astley	2
(England) Craig Steadman	3
(England) Mark King	6
(Wales) Matthew Stevens	6
(Northern Ireland) Jordan Brown	4
(China) Zhao Xintong	6
(Thailand) James Wattana	5
(China) Zhang Anda	4
(China) Ding Junhui	6
(England) Sam Baird	2
(England) Alfie Burden	6
(England) David Lilley	6
(England) Ben Woollaston	5
(Northern Ireland) Mark Allen	6
(England) Liam Highfield	5
(Scotland) Graeme Dott	3
(Iran) Hossein Vafaei	6
(Norway) Kurt Maflin	0
(England) Ali Carter	6
(Cyprus) Michael Georgiou	1
(Scotland) Stephen Maguire	6
(China) He Guoqiang	1
(China) Zhou Yuelong	6
(Thailand) Sunny Akani	6
(Wales) Mark Williams	3

Last 32; Best of 11 frames
(England) Mark Selby	6
(England) Robert Milkins	4
(England) Ian Burns	5
(England) Stuart Carrington	6
(England) Joe Perry	5
(Australia) Neil Robertson	6
(China) Xiao Guodong	1
(China) Yuan Sijun	6
(England) Barry Hawkins	3
(England) Martin Gould	6
(Hong Kong) Marco Fu	3
(England) Jack Lisowski	6
(China) Yan Bingtao	6
(Wales) Ryan Day	5
(England) Michael Holt	1
(England) Judd Trump	6
(England) Martin O'Donnell	6
(England) Tom Ford	0
(Israel) Eden Sharav	5
(England) David Gilbert	6
(England) Mark King	5
(Wales) Matthew Stevens	6
(China) Zhao Xintong	4
(China) Ding Junhui	6
(England) Alfie Burden	6
(England) David Lilley	0
(Northern Ireland) Mark Allen	6
(Iran) Hossein Vafaei	3
(England) Ali Carter	6
(Scotland) Stephen Maguire	4
(China) Zhou Yuelong	4
(Thailand) Sunny Akani	6

Last 16; Best of 11 frames
(England) Mark Selby	6
(England) Stuart Carrington	3
(Australia) Neil Robertson	6
(China) Yuan Sijun	4
(England) Martin Gould	5
(England) Jack Lisowski	6
(China) Yan Bingtao	1
(England) Judd Trump	6
(England) Martin O'Donnell	6
(England) David Gilbert	1
(Wales) Matthew Stevens	6
(China) Ding Junhui	5
(England) Alfie Burden	1
(Northern Ireland) Mark Allen	6
(England) Ali Carter	6
(Thailand) Sunny Akani	4

Quarter-finals; Best of 11 frames
(England) Mark Selby	4
(Australia) Neil Robertson	6
(England) Jack Lisowski	6
(England) Judd Trump	2
(England) Martin O'Donnell	5
(Wales) Matthew Stevens	6
(Northern Ireland) Mark Allen	6
(England) Ali Carter	0

Semi-finals; Best of 17 frames
(Australia) Neil Robertson	9
(England) Jack Lisowski	7
(Wales) Matthew Stevens	6
(Northern Ireland) Mark Allen	9

Final; Best of 19 frames
(Australia) Neil Robertson	5
(Northern Ireland) Mark Allen	10

== Final ==
Final: Best of 19 frames. Referee: Jan Verhaas. Baihu Media Broadcasting Centre, Daqing, China, 4 November 2018.
Neil Robertson; Australia	5–10	Mark Allen; Northern Ireland
Afternoon: 65–72, 101–32 (101), 41–61, 0–108 (108), 56–76, 4–103 (103), 0–119 (119), 35–69, 93–0; Evening: 84–1, 121–1 (121), 9–74, 19–114 (101), 127–8 (113), 44–85
121	Highest break	119
3	Century breaks	4

== Qualifying ==
Matches were played between 9 and 12 October 2018 at the Barnsley Metrodome in Barnsley, England. Matches involving Mark Selby, Noppon Saengkham, Liang Wenbo, Ding Junhui, Ben Woollaston, Liam Highfield, Gary Wilson and Mark Williams, were played in China. All matches best of 11 frames.

(England) Mark Selby	6–5	(China) Li Yuan
(Republic of Ireland) Ken Doherty	6–4	(Scotland) Chris Totten
(England) Robert Milkins	6–1	(Hong Kong) Andy Lee
(Thailand) Noppon Saengkham	6–4	(China) Chang Bingyu
(China) Liang Wenbo	6–3	(England) Ashley Hugill
(England) Peter Ebdon	5–6	(England) Ian Burns
(Scotland) Anthony McGill	6–5	(China) Xu Si
(England) Stuart Carrington	6–3	(England) Hammad Miah
(England) Mark Davis	6–4	(England) Elliot Slessor
(England) Joe Perry	6–3	(England) Harvey Chandler
(England) Matthew Selt	6–0	(England) Sean O'Sullivan
(Australia) Neil Robertson	6–1	(Scotland) Ross Muir
(China) Lyu Haotian	5–6	(China) Fan Zhengyi
(China) Xiao Guodong	6–1	(Germany) Lukas Kleckers
(England) Robbie Williams	2–6	(China) Yuan Sijun
(England) Kyren Wilson	6–4	(England) Nigel Bond
(England) Barry Hawkins	6–1	(England) Sanderson Lam
(Thailand) Thepchaiya Un-Nooh	6–5	(China) Mei Xiwen
(England) Martin Gould	6–1	(China) Zhang Yong
(China) Li Hang	6–0	(China) Chen Zifan
(Hong Kong) Marco Fu	6–2	(Germany) Simon Lichtenberg
(England) Andrew Higginson	6–1	(Scotland) Rhys Clark
(England) Jack Lisowski	6–5	(England) Oliver Lines
(England) Chris Wakelin	6–3	(Malaysia) Thor Chuan Leong
(Republic of Ireland) Fergal O'Brien	5–6	(England) Jimmy White
(China) Yan Bingtao	6–0	(Switzerland) Alexander Ursenbacher
(England) Mike Dunn	3–6	(China) Tian Pengfei
(Wales) Ryan Day	6–2	(Wales) Lee Walker
(England) Michael Holt	6–3	(England) Joe O'Connor
(Wales) Michael White	1–6	(China) Luo Honghao
(Scotland) Alan McManus	6–5	(Wales) Jamie Clarke
(England) Judd Trump	6−4	(China) Lu Ning
(Scotland) John Higgins	3–6	(England) Peter Lines
(England) Martin O'Donnell	6–2	(England) Rod Lawler
(England) Tom Ford	6–5	(Northern Ireland) Joe Swail
(England) Jimmy Robertson	6–3	(Poland) Adam Stefanow
(England) Stuart Bingham	6–1	(China) Chen Feilong
(Wales) Dominic Dale	5–6	(Scotland) Eden Sharav
(England) David Gilbert	6–5	(England) Sam Craigie
(Scotland) Scott Donaldson	2–6	(England) John Astley
(England) Mark Joyce	4–6	(England) Craig Steadman
(England) Mark King	6–5	(Northern Ireland) Gerard Greene
(Wales) Matthew Stevens	6–3	(Pakistan) Hamza Akbar
(Belgium) Luca Brecel	5–6	(Northern Ireland) Jordan Brown
(Wales) Jamie Jones (Note: Jamie Jones was suspended by the WPBSA due to pending investigations into an alleged breach of betting rules)	w/d–w/o	(China) Zhao Xintong
(England) Anthony Hamilton	5–6	(Thailand) James Wattana
(Wales) Daniel Wells	4–6	(China) Zhang Anda
(China) Ding Junhui	6–4	(Finland) Robin Hull
(England) Shaun Murphy	0–6	(England) Sam Baird
(England) Rory McLeod	5–6	(England) Alfie Burden
(England) Ricky Walden	4–6	(England) David Lilley
(England) Ben Woollaston	6–3	(China) Bai Langning
(Northern Ireland) Mark Allen	6–0	(England) Paul Davison
(England) Liam Highfield	6–1	(China) Luo Zetao
(Scotland) Graeme Dott	6–5	(England) Ashley Carty
(Iran) Hossein Vafaei	6–3	(China) Niu Zhuang
(Norway) Kurt Maflin	6–0	(Wales) Jak Jones
(England) Ali Carter	6–3	(Wales) Kishan Hirani
(Cyprus) Michael Georgiou	6–3	(England) Billy Joe Castle
(Scotland) Stephen Maguire	6–0	(Wales) Duane Jones
(England) Gary Wilson	1−6	(China) He Guoqiang
(China) Zhou Yuelong	6–1	(England) Allan Taylor
(Thailand) Sunny Akani	6–5	(Iran) Soheil Vahedi
(Wales) Mark Williams	6–1	(China) Zhang Jiankang

== Century breaks ==
=== Qualifying stage centuries ===
Total: 47

- 144 – Matthew Selt
- 142, 117, 117 – Xiao Guodong
- 137 – Martin Gould
- 135 – Michael Holt
- 135 – Martin O'Donnell
- 134, 109 – Mark Davis
- 134 – Ryan Day
- 133, 106 – Chris Wakelin
- 132 – Anthony McGill
- 130 – Peter Ebdon
- 130 – Adam Stefanow
- 128, 101 – Neil Robertson
- 127, 107 – Sam Craigie
- 127 – Andrew Higginson
- 126 – Oliver Lines
- 125 – Elliot Slessor
- 123, 112 – Stuart Bingham
- 116 – Sam Baird
- 114 – Tom Ford
- 113, 100 – Lu Ning
- 113 – Stephen Maguire
- 111 – Luo Honghao
- 110, 104 – Robert Milkins
- 108, 105 – Hossein Vafaei
- 108 – Sunny Akani
- 107 – Xu Si
- 106 – Michael Georgiou
- 105, 102, 100 – Judd Trump
- 104 – Ali Carter
- 104 – Mei Xiwen
- 104 – Fergal O'Brien
- 102 – Eden Sharav
- 101, 100 – Kurt Maflin
- 100 – Michael White

=== Televised stage centuries ===
Total: 107

- 146, 142, 129, 127, 125, 120, 120, 119, 112, 108, 103, 102, 101, 101 – Mark Allen
- 144, 127, 127, 115, 110 – Matthew Stevens
- 142, 137 – Alfie Burden
- 140, 107, 106 – Michael Holt
- 139, 103 – Martin Gould
- 137, 133, 131, 124, 117, 102, 100 – Mark Selby
- 137, 116, 104 – Zhao Xintong
- 137, 104 – Yan Bingtao
- 136 – Hossein Vafaei
- 135, 127, 125, 121, 119, 113, 113, 113, 101, 101 – Neil Robertson
- 135 – Zhou Yuelong
- 133, 128, 112, 106, 106, 103, 102 – Jack Lisowski
- 133, 111 – Ryan Day
- 132, 107 – Ali Carter
- 132, 105 – Barry Hawkins
- 131, 123 – Chang Bingyu
- 131 – Li Yuan
- 130 – Stuart Bingham
- 130 – Liang Wenbo
- 129 – Graeme Dott
- 128, 112 – Ding Junhui
- 128 – Mark King
- 124, 103 – Jimmy Robertson
- 123, 119, 104 – Judd Trump
- 122, 116, 106 – Stuart Carrington
- 122 – Liam Highfield
- 121 – Ben Woollaston
- 116, 108, 105, 100 – Marco Fu
- 116, 105, 104 – Eden Sharav
- 112 – Robert Milkins
- 110, 108, 108, 101 – Noppon Saengkham
- 110, 108, 101, 101 – Sunny Akani
- 110 – Jordan Brown
- 110 – Joe Perry
- 106, 100 – Tom Ford
- 106 – Mark Williams
- 106 – Luo Honghao
- 101 – Stephen Maguire
- 101 – Martin O'Donnell
- 100 – He Guoqiang
