= 2018 UK Championship =

Snooker tournament

2018 Betway UK Championship

Tournament information
- Dates: 27 November – 9 December 2018
- Venue: Barbican Centre
- City: York
- Country: England
- Organisation: World Snooker
- Format: Ranking event
- Total prize fund: £850,000
- Winner's share: £170,000
- Highest break: Stuart Bingham (ENG) (145)

Final
- Champion: Ronnie O'Sullivan (ENG)
- Runner-up: Mark Allen (NIR)
- Score: 10–6

The 2018 UK Championship (officially the 2018 Betway UK Championship) was a professional ranking snooker tournament, that took place from 27 November to 9 December 2018. It was the ninth ranking tournament and the first Triple Crown event of the 2018/2019 season. The event was broadcast on BBC Sport and Eurosport in the United Kingdom.

Ronnie O'Sullivan, the defending champion, defeated Mark Allen 10–6 in the final, winning his 7th UK Championship and his 34th ranking event overall. In doing so, he became the first player since Stephen Hendry in 1996 to successfully defend the UK title. O'Sullivan broke Hendry's record for the most Triple Crown titles (18), Steve Davis's record of UK Championship titles (6) and became the second player to defend all Triple Crown tournaments at least once, after Hendry. The win was 25 years after his first UK Championship title as a 17 year old in 1993.

Stuart Bingham made the event's highest break of 145 in the first frame of his third round match against David Gilbert.

== Prize fund ==
The total prize money for the event was identical to that of the previous year's event, with the winner earning £170,000 and an overall prize fund of £850,000. The breakdown of prize money and ranking points for this year is shown below:

- Winner: £170,000
- Runner-up: £75,000
- Semi-final: £35,000
- Quarter-final: £22,500
- Last 16: £15,000
- Last 32: £10,000
- Last 64: £5,000
- Highest break: £5,000
- Total: £850,000

The "rolling 147 prize" for a maximum break stood at £15,000 but was not claimed.

== Tournament summary ==
The 2018 UK Championship began on 27 November 2018. The tournament featured 128 players with no qualification round. All of the matches, up to and including the semi-finals, were played over a single session that was held as best of 11 frame matches, with the final played on 9 December over two sessions in a best of 19 frame match.

=== Early rounds (1–4) ===
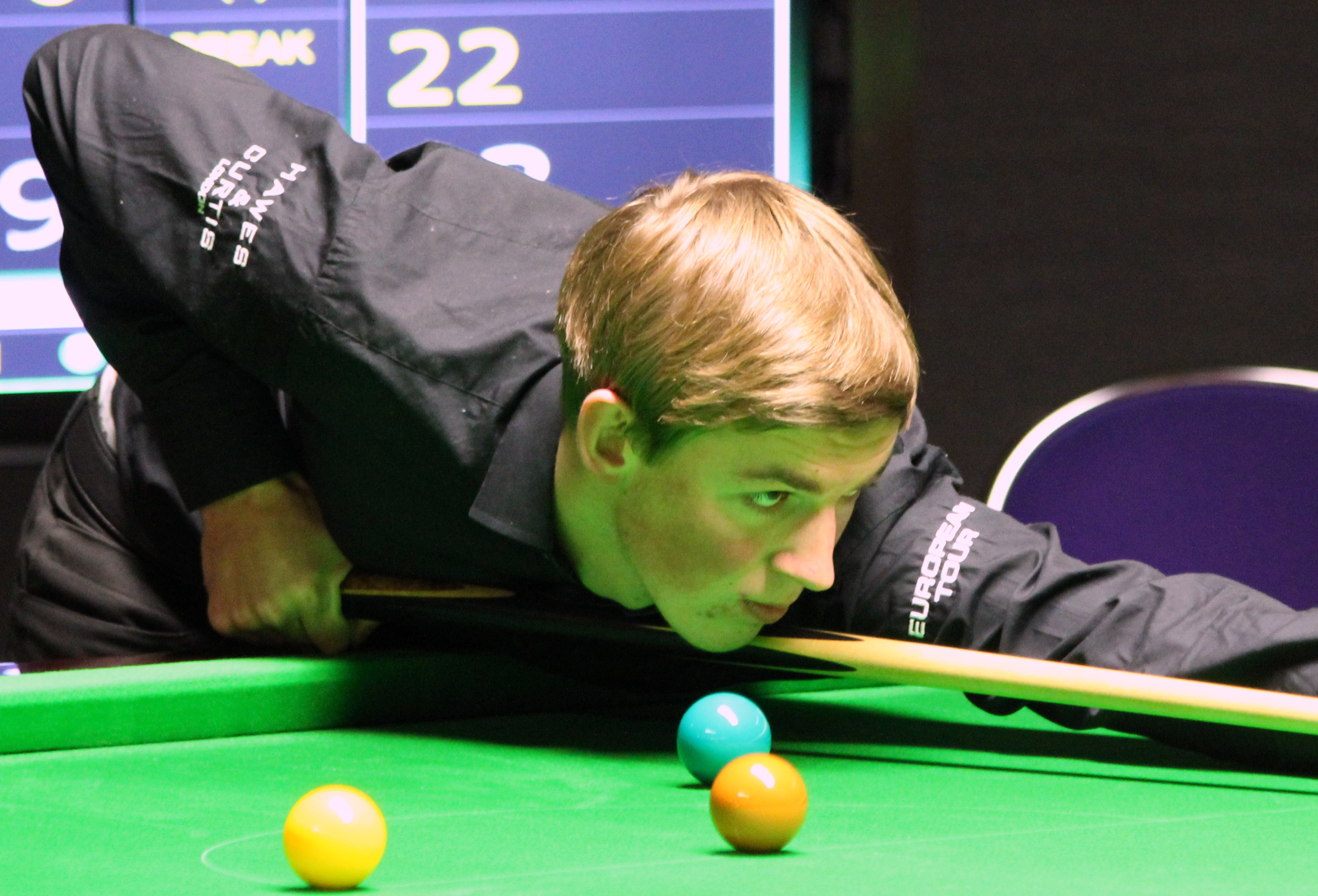
Amateur player James Cahill defeated world number one Mark Selby in the opening round, 6–3

The tournament opened on 27 November 2018 with the first round of 128 players, which saw a number of upsets: most notably twice champion and World number one, Mark Selby, fell to unseeded amateur James Cahill, 3–6; and former champion and ninth seed Shaun Murphy lost by the same scoreline to 120th seed Chen Feilong. Also, 12th seed Ryan Day lost 2–6 to 117th seed Joe O'Connor; 20th seed Anthony McGill lost 5–6 to 109th seed Lu Ning; and 102nd seed Sam Baird came from 1–5 down to beat 27th seed Liang Wenbo 6–5. Thrice champion and fourth seed John Higgins scraped past unseeded amateur Dechawat Poomjaeng 6–5, however, Higgins then lost in the second round 5–6 to Alan McManus.

The televised portion of the event began on 1 December as the second round got underway. This round saw defending champion Ronnie O'Sullivan defeat Ken Doherty 6–5 despite being behind 1–4. Eighth seed Ding Junhui defeated Matthew Selt 6–5. 2018 Northern Ireland Open winner Judd Trump missed a black ball at the end of the tenth frame, which would have clinched a 6–4 win against Dominic Dale, but Trump then triumphed in the deciding frame, 6–5. James Cahill, who defeated world number one Mark Selby in the first round, lost to 64th seed Sunny Akani on another 5–6. Elsewhere in round two, Mark Williams and Barry Hawkins both recorded 6–0 whitewashes of their second round opponents, Daniel Wells and Ian Burns respectively. Hawkins' win was his second consecutive 6–0 win, having defeated his first round opponent Jamie Clarke by the same margin.

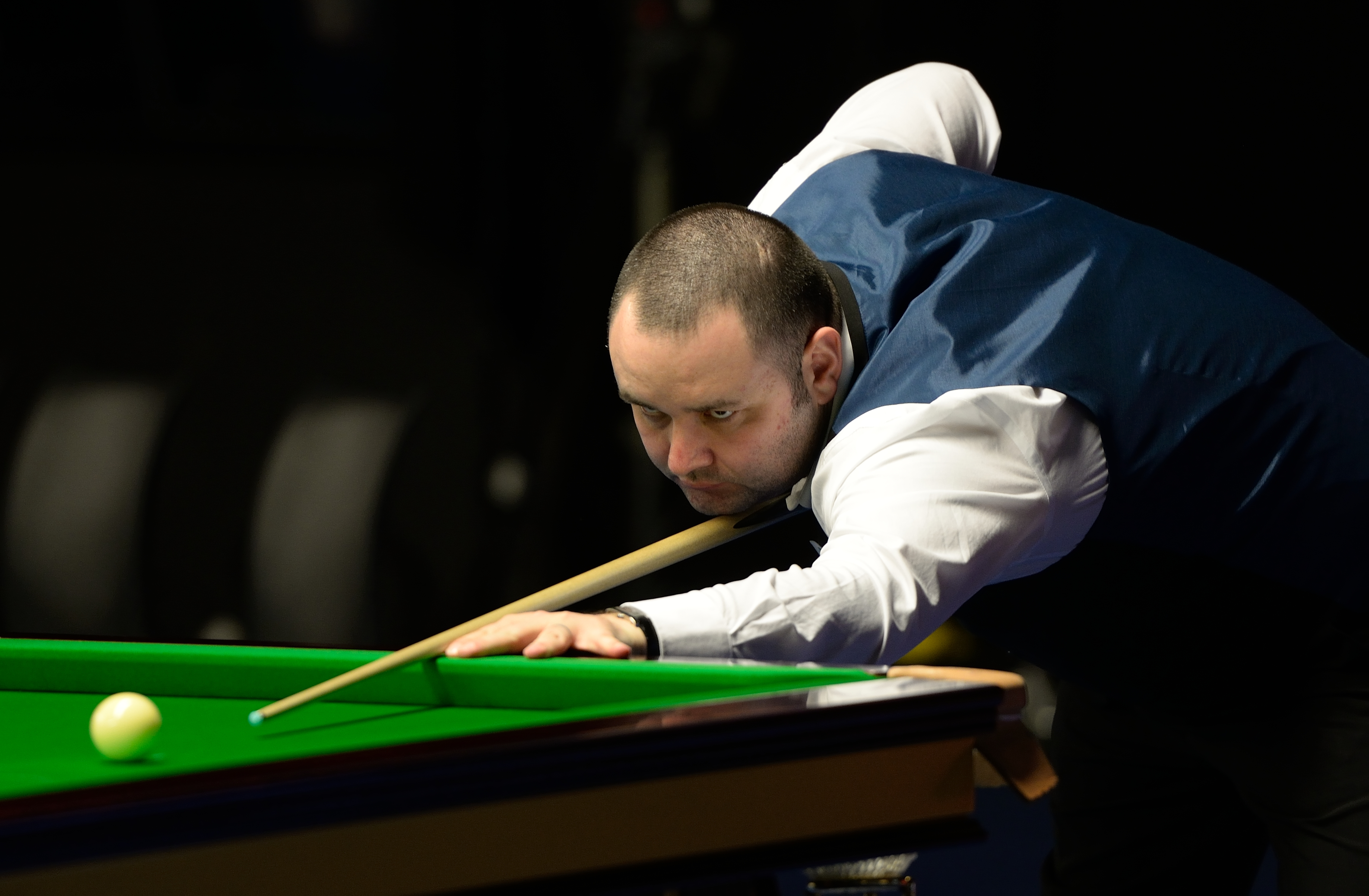
Stephen Maguire defeated 2018 world champion Mark Williams despite being behind 0–4

The third round, played from 3 December 2018, saw the competition's last 32 players compete. The lowest ranked player remaining in the competition, Joe O'Connor (ranked 117th), was defeated by England's Joe Perry 2–6. However, 109th seed Lu Ning defeated 13th seed Luca Brecel 6–4. Ronnie O'Sullivan defeated Zhou Yuelong in a whitewash 6–0 to progress to the last 16.

The fourth round began on 5 December 2018. Defending champion Ronnie O'Sullivan progressed to the quarter-finals, defeating Jack Lisowski by a 6–1 scoreline. However, world champion Mark Williams lost to 15th seed Stephen Maguire in a deciding frame, having led 4–0 earlier in the match. Martin O'Donnell (ranked 56th) upset China's eighth seed Ding Junhui by 6–4, and then defeated Judd Trump by the same scoreline to eliminate him from the competition. Tom Ford survived a decider with Lu Ning, the lowest ranked player left in the tournament. Meanwhile, Mark Allen also survived a deciding frame against Neil Robertson to go through to the quarter-finals, after making two consecutive centuries from 4–5 down.

=== Finals (quarter-finals to final) ===
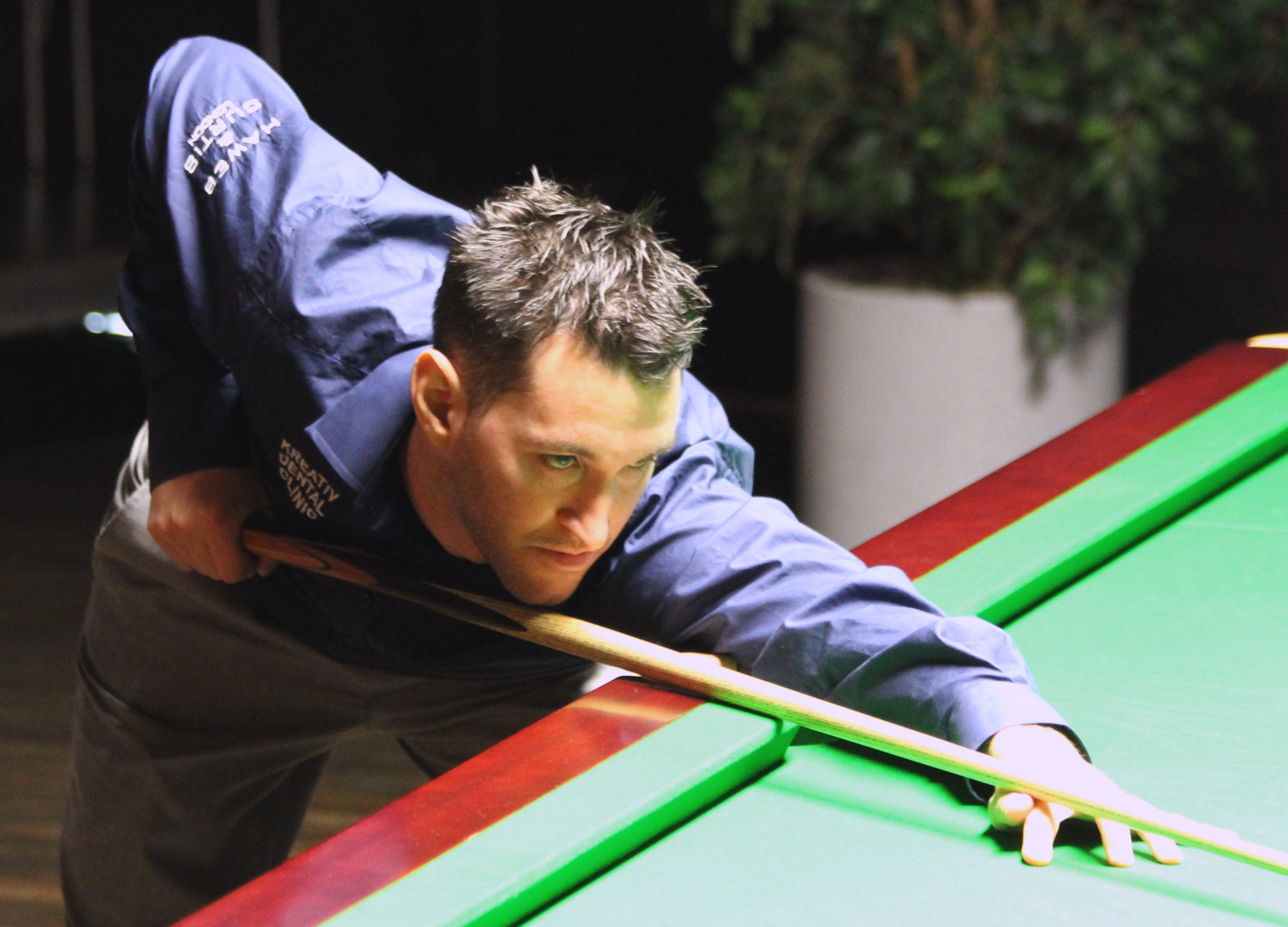
Tom Ford reached his first Triple Crown semi-final

The event's quarter-finals began on 7 December 2018. The afternoon session saw defending champion O'Sullivan defeat Martin O'Donnell 6–1. This was O'Donnell's first Triple Crown quarter-final. Prior to the 2018/19 season, he had only reached the semi-finals of the 2018 Snooker Shoot Out. World number 21 Joe Perry was defeated by Tom Ford 2–6. This was Ford's first Triple Crown semi-final, and his third semi-final appearance since the 2013 Players Championship. He was runner-up in the 2016 Paul Hunter Classic.

The second set of quarter-finals took place in the evening and saw Mark Allen defeat Stephen Maguire 6–1. Maguire blamed his loss on the playing conditions, stating that "you can't play good snooker" on the table used. Despite the scoreline, Allen said he felt as though "he didn't play well". In the last quarter-final, 2015 world champion Stuart Bingham defeated Kyren Wilson 6–2. During the match, Bingham attempted a maximum break; he potted fifteen reds and blacks, before missing the yellow ball.

The semi-finals were played once again as best of eleven frame matches on 8 December 2018. The first semi-final match saw Tom Ford play Ronnie O'Sullivan. Ford won the opening frame of the match, with a break of 68, but lost the remaining six frames of the match, finishing 1–6. O'Sullivan reached the final, his fourth in five years, having declined to enter the UK Championship in 2015. The second semi-final was between Stuart Bingham and Mark Allen. The match finished in favour of Allen, who won 6–5, despite Bingham being ahead 4–2.

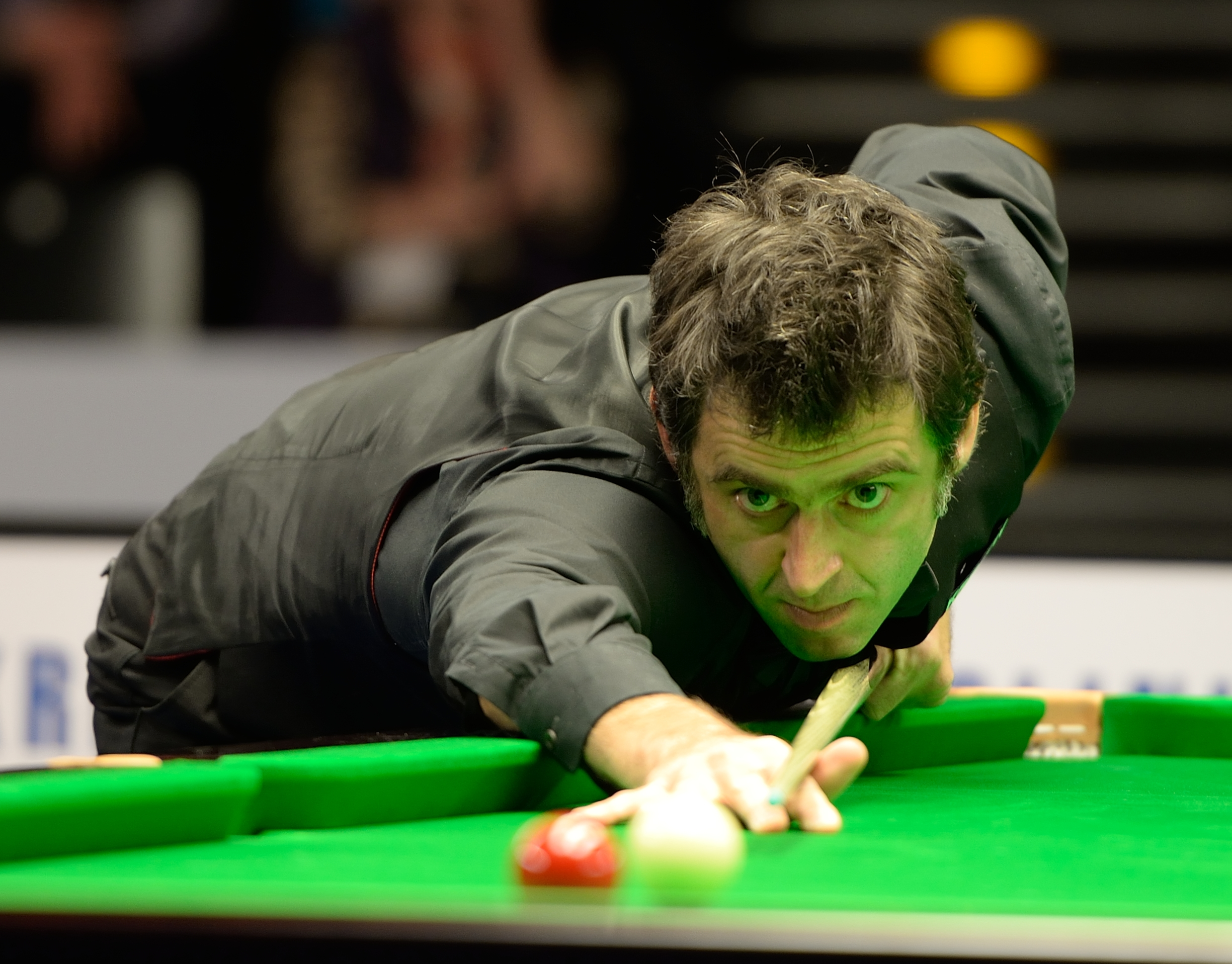
Ronnie O'Sullivan defeated Mark Allen to win his seventh UK Championship

The final was played on 9 December 2018 as a best of 19 frames match, spread over two sessions. It was contested between 2011 UK Championship runner-up Mark Allen and 2017 champion Ronnie O'Sullivan. The first four frames of the final were shared, however, the remaining four frames of the first session were won by O'Sullivan, leaving him 6–2 ahead after the initial session. In the evening session, O'Sullivan won the first frame, before Allen scored the highest break of the final (105), and entered the interval at 4–8 behind. O'Sullivan won the next frame, leaving him one frame from winning the tournament. Allen responded to clinch the next two frames including an attempt at a maximum break, which failed. O'Sullivan compiled a break of 78 in the 16th frame to win the championship.

On winning the event, O'Sullivan overtook the record for both the number of UK Championship wins held by Steve Davis (6), and the total number of Triple Crown events held by Stephen Hendry (18). O'Sullivan's 2018 win was his seventh UK Championship, and nineteenth Triple Crown championship win overall. Of his achievement, O'Sullivan commented, "It's amazing to beat my hero Stephen Hendry's record. He was the ultimate player. I've still got eight world titles to get, so I'm chasing that one," referring to Hendry's greater number of World Snooker Championship victories.

== Main draw ==
=== Top half ===
==== Section 1 ====
Last 128; Best of 11 frames
1	Ronnie O'Sullivan (ENG)	6
A	Luke Simmonds (ENG)	1
64	Yuan Sijun (CHN)	2
65	Ken Doherty (IRL)	6
32	Zhou Yuelong (CHN)	6
97	Soheil Vahedi (IRN)	1
33	Mark Davis (ENG)	6
96	Sam Craigie (ENG)	4
16	Marco Fu (HKG)	6
113	Hammad Miah (ENG)	0
49	Michael Georgiou (CYP)	0
80	Luo Honghao (CHN)	6
17	Jack Lisowski (ENG)	6
112	Zhang Jiankang (CHN)	1
48	Fergal O'Brien (IRL)	5
81	Mei Xiwen (CHN)	6

Last 64; Best of 11 frames
1	(England) Ronnie O'Sullivan	6
65	(Republic of Ireland) Ken Doherty	5
32	(China) Zhou Yuelong	6
33	(England) Mark Davis	4
16	(Hong Kong) Marco Fu	6
80	(China) Luo Honghao	2
17	(England) Jack Lisowski	6
81	(China) Mei Xiwen	1

Last 32; Best of 11 frames
1	(England) Ronnie O'Sullivan	6
32	(China) Zhou Yuelong	0
16	(Hong Kong) Marco Fu	3
17	(England) Jack Lisowski	6

Last 16; Best of 11 frames
1	(England) Ronnie O'Sullivan	6
17	(England) Jack Lisowski	1

==== Section 2 ====
Last 128; Best of 11 frames
41	Lyu Haotian (CHN)	4
88	Tian Pengfei (CHN)	6
24	Jimmy Robertson (ENG)	6
105	Jordan Brown (NIR)	4
56	Martin O'Donnell (ENG)	6
73	Xu Si (CHN)	4
9	Shaun Murphy (ENG)	3
120	Chen Feilong (CHN)	6
40	Ben Woollaston (ENG)	6
89	Alfie Burden (ENG)	3
25	Xiao Guodong (CHN)	6
104	Sean O'Sullivan (ENG)	4
57	Matthew Selt (ENG)	6
72	Zhang Yong (CHN)	2
8	Ding Junhui (CHN)	6
121	Adam Stefanow (POL)	1

Last 64; Best of 11 frames
88	(China) Tian Pengfei	6
24	(England) Jimmy Robertson	2
56	(England) Martin O'Donnell	6
120	(China) Chen Feilong	2
40	(England) Ben Woollaston	3
25	(China) Xiao Guodong	6
57	(England) Matthew Selt	5
8	(China) Ding Junhui	6

Last 32; Best of 11 frames
88	(China) Tian Pengfei	4
56	(England) Martin O'Donnell	6
25	(China) Xiao Guodong	4
8	(China) Ding Junhui	6

Last 16; Best of 11 frames
56	(England) Martin O'Donnell	6
8	(China) Ding Junhui	4

==== Section 3 ====
Last 128; Best of 11 frames
5	Judd Trump (ENG)	6
A	David Lilley (ENG)	0
60	Dominic Dale (WAL)	6
69	Gerard Greene (NIR)	4
28	Mark King (ENG)	6
101	Elliot Slessor (ENG)	5
37	Li Hang (CHN)	6
92	Lee Walker (WAL)	3
12	Ryan Day (WAL)	2
117	Joe O'Connor (ENG)	6
53	Andrew Higginson (ENG)	6
76	Nigel Bond (ENG)	2
21	Joe Perry (ENG)	6
108	John Astley (ENG)	0
44	Michael Holt (ENG)	6
85	Chen Zifan (CHN)	1

Last 64; Best of 11 frames
5	(England) Judd Trump	6
60	(Wales) Dominic Dale	5
28	(England) Mark King	6
37	(China) Li Hang	2
117	(England) Joe O'Connor	6
53	(England) Andrew Higginson	3
21	(England) Joe Perry	6
44	(England) Michael Holt	1

Last 32; Best of 11 frames
5	(England) Judd Trump	6
28	(England) Mark King	2
117	(England) Joe O'Connor	2
21	(England) Joe Perry	6

Last 16; Best of 11 frames
5	(England) Judd Trump	4
21	(England) Joe Perry	6

==== Section 4 ====
Last 128; Best of 11 frames
45	Mark Joyce (ENG)	6
84	Niu Zhuang (CHN)	3
20	Anthony McGill (SCO)	5
109	Lu Ning (CHN)	6
52	Liam Highfield (ENG)	6
77	Robin Hull (FIN)	4
13	Luca Brecel (BEL)	6
116	Fan Zhengyi (CHN)	4
36	Tom Ford (ENG)	6
93	Craig Steadman (ENG)	5
29	Robert Milkins (ENG)	6
100	Sanderson Lam (ENG)	1
61	Alan McManus (SCO)	6
68	Alexander Ursenbacher (SUI)	1
4	John Higgins (SCO)	6
A	Dechawat Poomjaeng (THA)	5

Last 64; Best of 11 frames
45	(England) Mark Joyce	4
109	(China) Lu Ning	6
52	(England) Liam Highfield	5
13	(Belgium) Luca Brecel	6
36	(England) Tom Ford	6
29	(England) Robert Milkins	5
61	(Scotland) Alan McManus	6
4	(Scotland) John Higgins	5

Last 32; Best of 11 frames
109	(China) Lu Ning	6
13	(Belgium) Luca Brecel	4
36	(England) Tom Ford	6
61	(Scotland) Alan McManus	3

Last 16; Best of 11 frames
109	(China) Lu Ning	5
36	(England) Tom Ford	6

=== Bottom half ===
==== Section 5 ====
Last 128; Best of 11 frames
3	Mark Selby (ENG)	3
A	James Cahill (ENG)	6
62	Sunny Akani (THA)	6
67	Eden Sharav (ISR)	5
30	Ricky Walden (ENG)	5
99	Jak Jones (WAL)	6
35	Michael White (WAL)	5
94	Joe Swail (NIR)	6
14	Stuart Bingham (ENG)	6
115	James Wattana (THA)	0
51	Kurt Maflin (NOR)	6
78	Zhang Anda (CHN)	3
19	David Gilbert (ENG)	6
110	Ashley Carty (ENG)	3
46	Peter Ebdon (ENG)	6
83	Chris Totten (SCO)	2

Last 64; Best of 11 frames
A	(England) James Cahill	5
62	(Thailand) Sunny Akani	6
99	(Wales) Jak Jones	6
94	(Northern Ireland) Joe Swail	5
14	(England) Stuart Bingham	6
51	(Norway) Kurt Maflin	5
19	(England) David Gilbert	6
46	(England) Peter Ebdon	4

Last 32; Best of 11 frames
62	(Thailand) Sunny Akani	6
99	(Wales) Jak Jones	2
14	(England) Stuart Bingham	6
19	(England) David Gilbert	2

Last 16; Best of 11 frames
62	(Thailand) Sunny Akani	2
14	(England) Stuart Bingham	6

==== Section 6 ====
Last 128; Best of 11 frames
43	Stuart Carrington (ENG)	1
86	Paul Davison (ENG)	6
22	Yan Bingtao (CHN)	6
107	Lukas Kleckers (GER)	1
54	Mike Dunn (ENG)	6
75	Allan Taylor (ENG)	4
11	Kyren Wilson (ENG)	6
118	Andy Lee (HKG)	0
38	Gary Wilson (ENG)	6
91	Billy Joe Castle (ENG)	4
27	Liang Wenbo (CHN)	5
102	Sam Baird (ENG)	6
59	Robbie Williams (ENG)	5
70	Ian Burns (ENG)	6
6	Barry Hawkins (ENG)	6
123	Jamie Clarke (WAL)	0

Last 64; Best of 11 frames
86	(England) Paul Davison	1
22	(China) Yan Bingtao	6
54	(England) Mike Dunn	2
11	(England) Kyren Wilson	6
38	(England) Gary Wilson	6
102	(England) Sam Baird	3
70	(England) Ian Burns	0
6	(England) Barry Hawkins	6

Last 32; Best of 11 frames
22	(China) Yan Bingtao	2
11	(England) Kyren Wilson	6
38	(England) Gary Wilson	4
6	(England) Barry Hawkins	6

Last 16; Best of 11 frames
11	(England) Kyren Wilson	6
6	(England) Barry Hawkins	2

==== Section 7 ====
Last 128; Best of 11 frames
7	Mark Allen (NIR)	6
122	Basem Eltahhan (EGY)	2
58	Rory McLeod (ENG)	6
71	Peter Lines (ENG)	3
26	Martin Gould (ENG)	6
103	Harvey Chandler (ENG)	1
39	Hossein Vafaei (IRN)	6
90	Ashley Hugill (ENG)	5
10	Neil Robertson (AUS)	6
119	Kishan Hirani (WAL)	2
55	Thepchaiya Un-Nooh (THA)	6
74	Jimmy White (ENG)	3
23	Graeme Dott (SCO)	6
106	Oliver Lines (ENG)	2
42	Matthew Stevens (WAL)	6
87	Ross Muir (SCO)	4

Last 64; Best of 11 frames
7	(England) Mark Allen	6
58	(England) Rory McLeod	2
26	(England) Martin Gould	4
39	(Iran) Hossein Vafaei	6
10	(Australia) Neil Robertson	6
55	(Thailand) Thepchaiya Un-Nooh	3
23	(Scotland) Graeme Dott	6
42	(Wales) Matthew Stevens	2

Last 32; Best of 11 frames
7	(Northern Ireland) Mark Allen	6
39	(Iran) Hossein Vafaei	2
10	(Australia) Neil Robertson	6
23	(Scotland) Graeme Dott	5

Last 16; Best of 11 frames
7	(Northern Ireland) Mark Allen	6
10	(Australia) Neil Robertson	5

==== Section 8 ====
Last 128; Best of 11 frames
47	Chris Wakelin (ENG)	6
82	Duane Jones (WAL)	1
18	Ali Carter (ENG)	6
111	Thor Chuan Leong (MAS)	3
50	Scott Donaldson (SCO)	6
79	Li Yuan (CHN)	3
15	Stephen Maguire (SCO)	6
114	Simon Lichtenberg (GER)	3
34	Noppon Saengkham (THA)	6
95	Hamza Akbar (PAK)	1
31	Anthony Hamilton (ENG)	1
98	Rod Lawler (ENG)	6
63	Daniel Wells (WAL)	6
66	Zhao Xintong (CHN)	5
2	Mark Williams (WAL)	6
A	Adam Duffy (ENG)	2

Last 64; Best of 11 frames
47	(England) Chris Wakelin	4
18	(England) Ali Carter	6
50	(Scotland) Scott Donaldson	4
15	(Scotland) Stephen Maguire	6
34	(Thailand) Noppon Saengkham	6
98	(England) Rod Lawler	0
63	(Wales) Daniel Wells	0
2	(Wales) Mark Williams	6

Last 32; Best of 11 frames
18	(England) Ali Carter	3
15	(Scotland) Stephen Maguire	6
34	(Thailand) Noppon Saengkham	3
2	(Wales) Mark Williams	6

Last 16; Best of 11 frames
15	(Scotland) Stephen Maguire	6
2	(Wales) Mark Williams	5

=== Finals ===
Quarter-finals; Best of 11 frames
1	(England) Ronnie O'Sullivan	6
56	(England) Martin O'Donnell	1
21	(England) Joe Perry	2
36	(England) Tom Ford	6
14	(England) Stuart Bingham	6
11	(England) Kyren Wilson	1
7	(Northern Ireland) Mark Allen	6
15	(Scotland) Stephen Maguire	1

Semi-finals; Best of 11 frames
1	(England) Ronnie O'Sullivan	6
36	(England) Tom Ford	1
14	(England) Stuart Bingham	5
7	(Northern Ireland) Mark Allen	6

Final; Best of 19 frames
1	(England) Ronnie O'Sullivan	10
7	(Northern Ireland) Mark Allen	6

=== Final ===
Final: Best of 19 frames. Referee: Marcel Eckardt; Barbican Centre, York, England, 9 December 2018.
Ronnie O'Sullivan (1); England	10–6	Mark Allen (7); Northern Ireland
Afternoon: 54–63, 101–0 (101), 0–74, 85–0, 120–15, 76–15, 73–12, 73–25; Evening: 74–25, 4–93, 30–105 (105), 87–1, 63–59, 0–144, 9–93, 78–0
101	Highest break	105
1	Century breaks	1

== Century breaks ==
A total of 137 century breaks were made by 61 players during the 2018 UK Championship.

- 145, 132, 121, 120, 117, 108, 107, 102 – Stuart Bingham
- 144, 124, 119, 101 – Marco Fu
- 143, 136, 127, 121, 109, 107, 100, 100 – Joe Perry
- 141 – Daniel Wells
- 140 – Mei Xiwen
- 139 – Martin O'Donnell
- 139 – Hossein Vafaei
- 139 – Robbie Williams
- 137, 117, 110, 101 – Neil Robertson
- 136 – Ben Woollaston
- 135, 109, 103, 101 – Luca Brecel
- 135, 104 – Ali Carter
- 134, 133, 131, 128, 122, 100, 100 – David Gilbert
- 133 – Jimmy Robertson
- 130, 103 – Liang Wenbo
- 130 – Ken Doherty
- 130 – Matthew Selt
- 129, 105, 103, 101 – Tian Pengfei
- 129 – Sam Baird
- 128, 126, 122, 114, 105, 104, 102 – Mark Allen
- 128, 113, 112, 110, 100, 100 – Judd Trump
- 126, 126, 107, 100, 100 – Xiao Guodong
- 126 – Chen Feilong
- 124, 116, 112 – Mark Williams
- 123, 103 – Dominic Dale
- 122, 120, 109 – Stephen Maguire
- 122, 118, 118, 112, 112, 106, 102, 101 – Ronnie O'Sullivan
- 122, 118, 112 – Zhou Yuelong
- 120, 115, 112, 109, 100 – Jack Lisowski
- 120 – Chris Wakelin
- 119, 113, 108 – Tom Ford
- 119, 100 – Noppon Saengkham
- 119 – Thor Chuan Leong
- 119 – Lu Ning
- 117 – Fergal O'Brien
- 116 – Craig Steadman
- 115, 108 – Xu Si
- 115, 101 – Kyren Wilson
- 114, 105 – Jak Jones
- 113, 103 – Gary Wilson
- 112 – Eden Sharav
- 110, 105 – Thepchaiya Un-Nooh
- 110 – Mike Dunn
- 109 – Scott Donaldson
- 108 – Sunny Akani
- 108 – Martin Gould
- 107 – Gerard Greene
- 107 – Zhao Xintong
- 106, 103 – Kurt Maflin
- 106 – Robin Hull
- 106 – Yan Bingtao
- 105 – Graeme Dott
- 104 – Paul Davison
- 103 – Peter Ebdon
- 103 – Mark Selby
- 102 – Barry Hawkins
- 102 – Matthew Stevens
- 101 – Mark Davis
- 101 – John Higgins
- 101 – Luo Honghao
- 100 – Ashley Carty

== Sponsorship and broadcasting ==
The event was sponsored by betting company Betway, sponsors of the UK Championship since 2015. The tournament's broadcasters were dependent on country, with the BBC and Eurosport broadcasting across the United Kingdom and Europe respectively. The event was broadcast in China by Superstars Online, and China Central Television. In Hong Kong, NowTV simulcasted the event with additional commentary.

== Controversy ==
During the event, two players Yu Delu and Cao Yupeng, were found guilty of match fixing. World number 52, Yu, was banned for ten years and nine months for fixing five matches over a three-year period. Cao was banned from snooker for six years (with three-and-a-half years suspended) for fixing three matches. The chairman of the World Professional Billiards and Snooker Association, Jason Ferguson, expressed his disappointment, stating that the players involved "risk their careers and they will be caught". World champion Mark Williams has suggested that players found cheating "should get banned for life".

Ronnie O'Sullivan, who is critical of the number of events on the calendar and the punishing tour schedule, said he was ready to start a "breakaway tour" which would be separate from the World Snooker Tour. He stated that he would ask "four or five unhappy players", including Stephen Hendry and John Higgins, to start a new "Champions League-style" tour. He also indicated that he would invite players that were banned from World Snooker, including Yu and Cao. O'Sullivan insisted that the breakaway tour would benefit everybody, including the bottom-ranked players, but that his plan was a "last resort".

In response, World Snooker chairman, Barry Hearn called the plan "nonsensical", and "damaging" to the sport. Hearn also fielded criticism of the current tour schedule from players of all levels, including world champion Mark Williams, Stephen Maguire and Neil Robertson.

== Aftermath ==
During the final, a draw was made for the 2019 Masters in January. The event would see first round matches between Mark Allen and Luca Brecel, and between Ronnie O'Sullivan and Stuart Bingham. Six weeks later, the 2019 Masters was won by Judd Trump, who defeated Ronnie O'Sullivan in the final on 20 January 2019.

The next event of the season, the 2018 Scottish Open, began on 10 December, the day after the final of the UK Championship. O'Sullivan pulled out of the event hours after winning the UK Championship before his first round match with Daniel Wells. Having been given a bye through the first round, Wells reached his first ranking event semi-final, building a 4–0 lead against Mark Allen, before eventually losing 5–6. Although O'Sullivan was not a competitor, he attended the Scottish Open to work on Eurosport's coverage of the event.

Allen, after being runner-up at the UK Championship, won the Scottish Open despite stating that he had "disrespected" the tournament. He had consumed alcohol throughout the week, calling his appearance at the final "undeserved"; his highest break in the first four frames of his semi-final was just 24.
