= Eden Sharav =

Israeli-Scottish snooker player

Eden Sharav עדן שרב
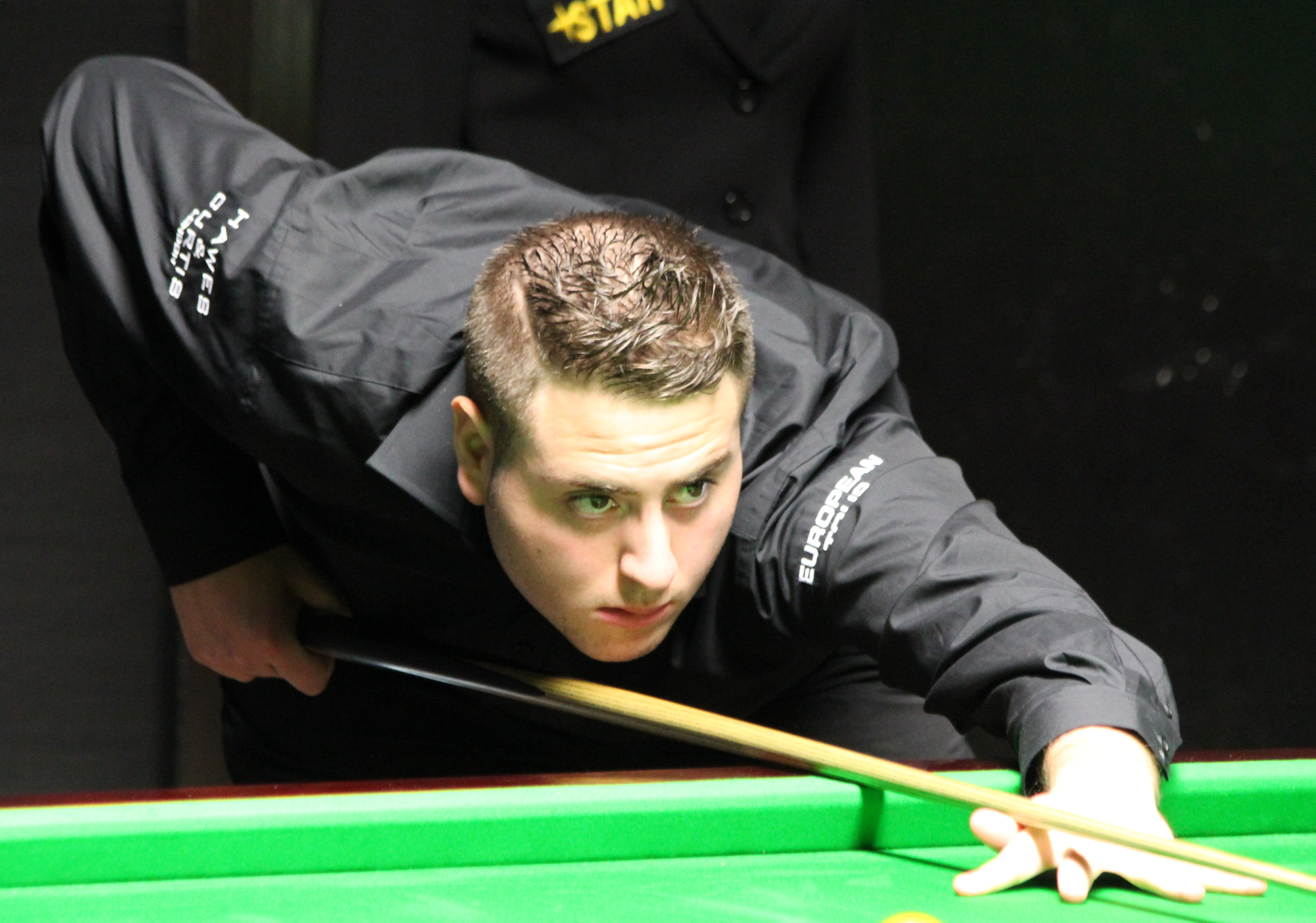
- Paul Hunter Classic 2014

Personal information
- Born: 30 April 1992 (age 34) Mishmar Ayalon, Israel

Sport
- Country: Scotland (until 2018); Israel (2018–present)
- Sport: Snooker
- Professional: 2015–2021 Earnings (£167,725)
- Highest ranking: 67 (May 2019)
- Best ranking finish: Semi-final (x1)

Eden Sharav (Hebrew: עדן שרב; born 30 April 1992) is an Israeli-Scottish former professional snooker player. He was born in Israel to an Israeli father and a Scottish-born mother.

== Career ==
=== Amateur ===
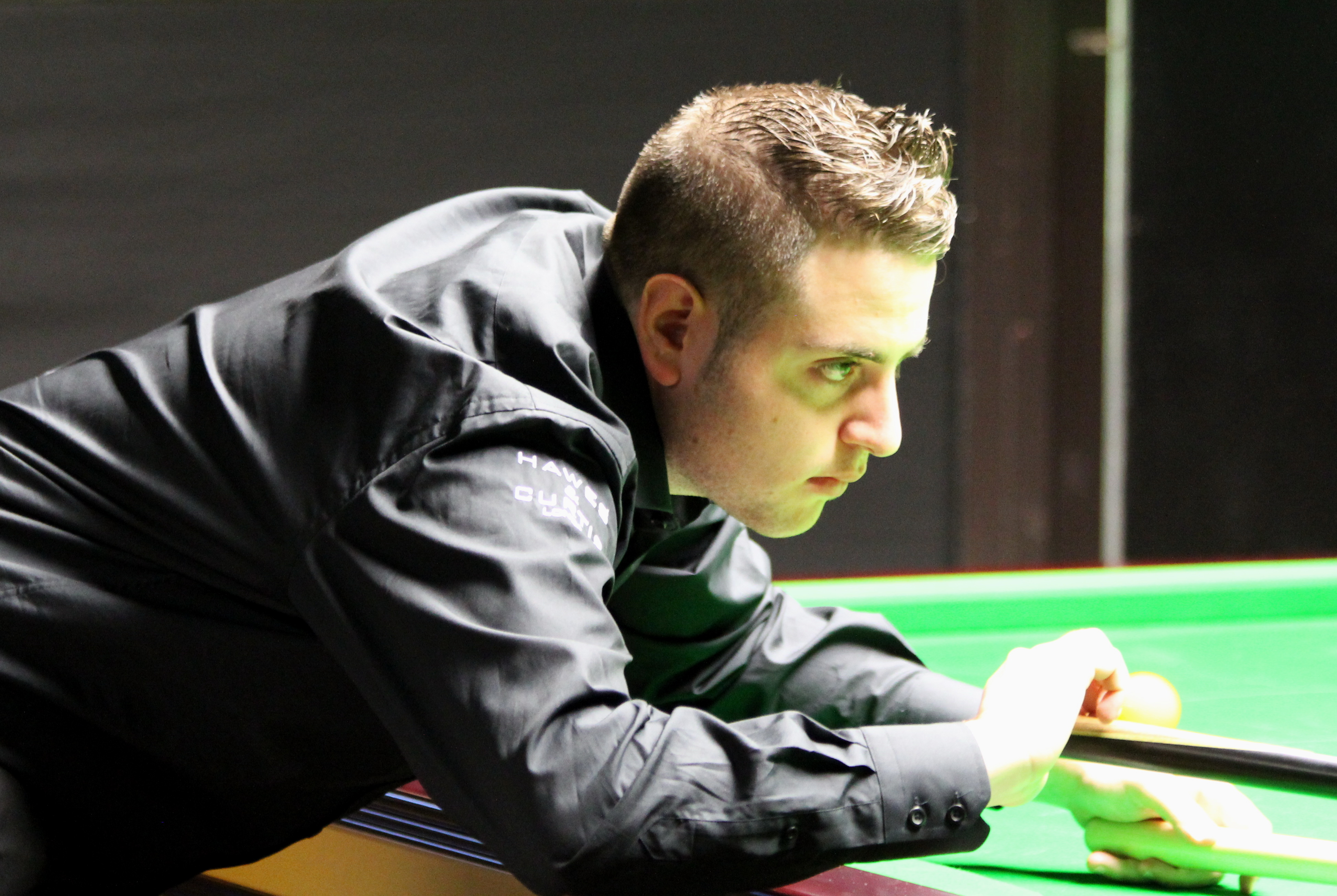
2014 Paul Hunter Classic

In 2010 Sharav reached the final of the Scottish amateur championship at the age of 17, one of the youngest players to compete in the final, the final was a best of 13 match against Bobby Cruickshanks, Eden lead the match 6-5 but eventually lost 7-6.

In 2011 Sharav won the Pontins "Star of the Future" event aged 19 beating fellow Scotsman Ross Muir 4–0 in the final in Prestatyn. A few months later as an amateur, Sharav reached the last 16 stage of his professional tournament debut in the Players Tour Championship, beating professionals, Liang Wenbo 4–0, Adam Duffy 4–1 and Gary Wilson 4–2, before a 4–0 defeat to Marcus Campbell.

In 2014 Sharav entered his first Q School with the aim to win a two-year professional tour card. He didn’t manage to qualify but was by far the most consistent player in the championship losing in the final rounds of both events to Tian Pengfei and Michael Leslie and finishing number one on the order of merit . finishing first meant he was able to enter all of the ranking tournaments as a top-up player for the 2014–15 season due to his strong Q School performances. He qualified for the venue stages of the 2014 International Championship and 2015 Indian Open, losing in the first round of both, 6-2 to Xiao Goudong and 4-2 to Mark Williams He then entered Q School at the end of the season.

=== Professional ===
In the first event of the 2015 Q School Sharav won four matches to reach the final round and in his last match he made breaks of 103 and 83 against Adam Duffy to win 4–3, a win which gave Sharav his first two-year professional card to the World Snooker Tour for the 2015–16 season and 2016–17 seasons.

==== 2015-2016 ====
He won his first match as a professional at the first attempt by winning 5-3 in the 2015 Australian Goldfields Open qualifiers. In the 2015 Riga masters Eden won his L128 match 4-2 against Jimmy Robertson before losing to Alan McManus in the L64. In the 2015 Shanghai masters Eden defeated Thailand’s Thanawat Thirapongpaiboon 5-2 in the L128 before losing to Jamie Burnett in the L64.

Eden achieved some success in the 2015 European tour in sofia, Bulgaria defeating Jamie Cope 4-3 and Luca Brecel 4-1, in the L32 he was level at 2-2 with Mark Selby but eventually lost 4-2. At the 2015 UK CHAMPIONSHIP Sharav came back from 5–2 behind against Alan McManus to level at 5–5. Eden got the snooker he needed in the decider, but McManus potted the blue to win in a match that finished at 1:30am.

At the 2016 German masters Eden had a very good match with Liang Wenbo, Eden had breaks of (53,70,104) but lost 5-4, Liang had (54,67,71,83,102,121)

Sharav knocked in breaks of (68,90,91) to defeat Nigel Bond 6-3 and qualify for the 2016 International championship, in the next round he was level with John Higgins at 3-3 but eventually lost 6-3 in the L64. In the 2016 NI OPEN Eden defeated Oliver lines 4-1 before losing to Yan Bingtao in the L64.

==== 2017-2018 ====
Eden once again defeated Oliver lines in the 2017 welsh open 4-1 before losing to Robert Milkins. Eden had a strong 5-3 win over Jamie Jones to qualify for the 2017 china open in Beijing, in his L64 match Eden defeated Ross Muir 5-0 before losing to Judd trump in the L32. In the 2017 world championship Eden had to win his first round match to secure his professional tour card, Sharav was losing 4-1 to Jamie Cope but came back and eventually win the match 10-5, in the next round Sharav lost to Michael Holt but secured his tour spot for the next two seasons.

Sharav had breaks of 80 and 140 to defeat Elliot Slessor 4-1 to qualify for the european masters, Eden lost 4-1 to Alfie Burden in the following round. Sharav made breaks of (65,84,86,88) to defeat Michael White 6-3 and qualify for the 2017 international championship, Eden lost 6-2 to Xiao Goudong in the following round. Sharav won only one more match for the rest of the season.

The following season was Eden’s best earning (£66,100) in the 2018 English open Sharav defeated Michael Georgiou 4-3, Liang Wenbo 4-2 and Craig Steadman 4-0 before losing 4-1 to Ronnie O'Sullivan in the L16. In the 2018 international championship Eden defeated Dominic Dale 6-5 on the final black to qualify, he then defeated Stuart Bingham 6-3, in the L32 despite having breaks of (54,104,105,116) and a 5-4 lead against David Gilbert Eden lost the match 6-5. Eden achieved his most successful tournament in the 2018 NI OPEN, Eden defeated Li Yuan 4-3, the next round Eden defeated Michael White 4-2 with breaks of (51,59,69,121,142) (142 career highest) he then defeated Joe swail 4-2 and Ali Carter 4-3 respectively, in the QF Eden was trailing 4-1 against former world champion Peter Ebdon but made his finest comeback of his career to win 5-4 and reach his first semi finals, Sharav lost in the SF 6-3 to Judd Trump, Sharav came from 4-1 to 4-3 in this match but was unable to go any further with Judd closing the match out. In the 2018 UK championship Sharav was 5-1 behind to Thai Sunny Akani, Eden came back to level the match 5-5 but Sunny prevailed in this decider.

In the 2019 Indian open Eden defeated Kurt Maflin 4-1 and Michael Georgiou 4-3 before losing 4-2 to Andy Hicks in the L32.

In the 2019 world championship Eden was 6-3 down to David Lilley in the opening session but won the second session 7-1 to win the match 10-7. He was then 9-6 down to Ricky Walden but won the four remaining frames to win the match 10-9. Sharav then lost in the final qualifying match 10-6 against chinese player Zhou Yuelong, Eden narrowly missed out on a top 64 spot as he finished 67 but he finished number one on the top 8 order of merit earning him a fresh tour card for the next two seasons.

== Performance and rankings timeline ==
Tournament	2014/ 15	2015/ 16	2016/ 17	2017/ 18	2018/ 19	2019/ 20	2020/ 21
Ranking (Note: It shows the ranking at the beginning of the season)	(Note: He was an amateur)	(Note: New players on the Main Tour don't have a ranking)	86	(Note: Players qualified One Year Ranking List started the season without ranking points)	85		71
Ranking tournaments
European Masters	Not Held		LQ	1R	2R	LQ	1R
English Open	Not Held		1R	1R	4R	1R	1R
Championship League	Non-Ranking Event						RR
Northern Ireland Open	Not Held		2R	1R	SF	1R	1R
UK Championship	1R	1R	1R	1R	1R	3R	1R
Scottish Open	Not Held		1R	2R	2R	1R	4R
World Grand Prix	NR	DNQ	DNQ	DNQ	DNQ	DNQ	DNQ
German Masters	LQ	LQ	LQ	LQ	LQ	LQ	LQ
Shoot-Out	Non-Ranking		3R	1R	A	1R	2R
Welsh Open	1R	1R	2R	1R	1R	1R	1R
Players Championship (Note: The event was called the Players Tour Championship Grand Final (2014/2015–2015/2016))	DNQ	DNQ	DNQ	DNQ	DNQ	DNQ	DNQ
Gibraltar Open	NH	MR	2R	1R	3R	1R	1R
WST Pro Series	Tournament Not Held						RR
Tour Championship	Tournament Not Held				DNQ	DNQ	DNQ
World Championship	LQ	LQ	LQ	LQ	LQ	LQ	LQ
Former ranking tournaments
Wuxi Classic	LQ	Tournament Not Held					
Australian Goldfields Open	A	LQ	Tournament Not Held				
Shanghai Masters	LQ	LQ	LQ	LQ	Non-Ranking		NH
Paul Hunter Classic	Minor-Ranking		A	1R	2R	NR	NH
Indian Open	1R	NH	1R	LQ	2R	Not Held	
China Open	LQ	LQ	2R	LQ	LQ	Not Held	
Riga Masters (Note: The event was called the Riga Open (2014/2015–2015/2016))	Minor-Ranking		LQ	1R	LQ	LQ	NH
International Championship	1R	LQ	1R	1R	2R	LQ	NH
China Championship	Not Held		NR	LQ	LQ	LQ	NH
World Open	Not Held		LQ	1R	LQ	LQ	NH
Former non-ranking tournaments
Haining Open	Minor-Ranking		QF	1R	A	A	NH

Performance Table Legend
LQ	lost in the qualifying draw	#R	lost in the early rounds of the tournament (WR = Wildcard round, RR = Round robin)	QF	lost in the quarter-finals
SF	lost in the semi-finals	F	lost in the final	W	won the tournament
DNQ	did not qualify for the tournament	A	did not participate in the tournament	WD	withdrew from the tournament

NH / Not Held	means an event was not held.
NR / Non-Ranking Event	means an event is/was no longer a ranking event.
R / Ranking Event	means an event is/was a ranking event.
MR / Minor-Ranking Event	means an event is/was a minor-ranking event.

== Career finals ==
=== Pro-am finals: 1 ===
Outcome	No.	Year	Championship	Opponent in the final	Score
Runner-up	1.	2017	PMK Invitational Pro-Am	(Scotland) Graeme Dott	3−4

=== Team finals: 2 ===
Outcome	No.	Year	Championship	Team/partner	Opponent in the final	Score
Runner-up	1.	2016	World Mixed Doubles Championship	(England) Maria Catalano	(Hong Kong) Cheung Ka Wai (Hong Kong) Jaique Ip	3–4
Runner-up	2.	2023	EBSA European Team Championship	(Israel) Shachar Ruberg	(Poland) Mateusz Baranowski (Poland) Antoni Kowalski	4–5

=== Amateur finals: 1 (1 title) ===
Outcome	No.	Year	Championship	Opponent in the final	Score
Winner	1.	2011	Pontins Star of the Future	(Scotland) Ross Muir	4–0
