= 2017 UK Championship =

Snooker tournament

2017 Betway UK Championship

Tournament information
- Dates: 28 November – 10 December 2017
- Venue: Barbican Centre
- City: York
- Country: England
- Organisation: World Snooker
- Format: Ranking event
- Total prize fund: £850,000
- Winner's share: £170,000
- Highest break: Michael White (WAL) (142)

Final
- Champion: Ronnie O'Sullivan (ENG)
- Runner-up: Shaun Murphy (ENG)
- Score: 10–5

The 2017 UK Championship (officially the 2017 Betway UK Championship) was a professional ranking snooker tournament that took place from 28 November to 10 December 2017 at the Barbican Centre in York, England. The event was the 41st edition of the UK Championship, first held in 1977, organised by the World Professional Billiards and Snooker Association. It was the eleventh ranking and first Triple Crown event of the 2017/2018 season. The event saw 128 players compete, with no qualification round. The prize fund was a total of £850,000, with £170,000 received by the winner.

Ronnie O'Sullivan equalled Steve Davis's record of six UK titles by defeating Shaun Murphy 10–5 in the final. This was O'Sullivan's 31st ranking and 18th Triple Crown title, also equalling Stephen Hendry's record for most Triple Crown championships. Mark Selby was the defending champion, but he was defeated by Scott Donaldson 3–6 in the last 64. Michael White won the highest break prize, with a 142 made in the second round. The event followed the Northern Ireland Open, and preceded the Scottish Open.

== Prize fund ==
The championship's prize money was identical to that of the previous year's event, with the event winner earning £170,000. The highest break prize of £5,000 was won by Michael White, who completed a 142 break during his second round match with Matthew Selt. The "rolling 147 prize" for a maximum break stood at £15,000, but went unclaimed. The breakdown of prize money is shown below:

- Last 64: £5,000
- Last 32: £10,000
- Last 16: £15,000
- Quarter-final: £22,500
- Semi-final: £35,000
- Runner-up: £75,000
- Winner: £170,000
- Highest break: £5,000
- Total: £850,000

== Tournament summary ==
The 2017 UK Championship was the eleventh ranking and first Triple Crown event of the 2017/2018 snooker season. The event saw 128 players from the World Snooker Tour take part, with all matches until the final being played as best of 11 frame matches, with the final being played as best of 19 frame match, held over two sessions. The first round of the competition started on 28 November 2017, with players being seeded according to their world rankings. (Note: The winner of the previous year's event would usually be the number one seed for the tournament, with the world champion ranked second. However, as Mark Selby was both the reigning world champion, defending UK Champion, and world number 1, the order of rankings was not affected.)

=== Early rounds (first–fourth round) ===
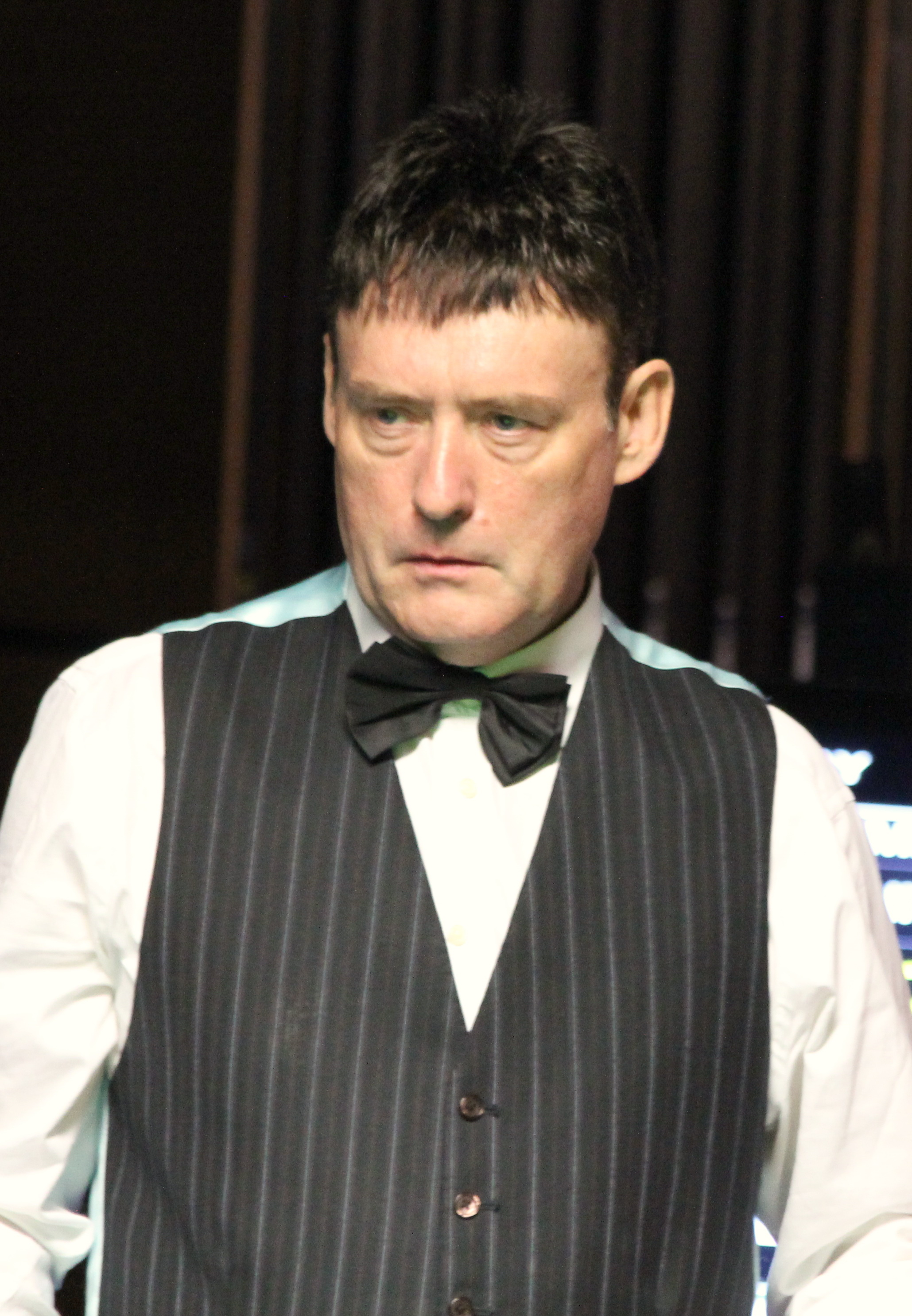
Jimmy White defeated Ali Carter in the first round, despite being more than 100 places lower in the rankings.

The first round saw few upsets, with most of the highest ranked players progressing. However, Ding Junhui (second seed) was defeated by world number 130 Leo Fernandez 6–5, despite having led 5–1, and having a chance to win the match in frame 7. Fernandez had only recently returned to the professional circuit after serving a 15-month ban for a corruption charge. Elsewhere, Ali Carter (11th seed) lost 6–2 to Jimmy White (118). Despite Carter having been ahead 2–1, White won the next five frames to progress. Another upset saw Lyu Haotian (104) defeat Anthony Hamilton (25) 6–1.

The second round of the tournament was played from 2–3 December and began with defending champion, and world number one Mark Selby losing to Scott Donaldson (64) 3–6. Donaldson had lost all 10 matches of his season prior to the tournament, won six of the last seven frames to win the match, having trailed 0–2. The remaining top 16 players progressed through the second round, with the lowest ranked player to proceed being Lyu – ranked 104 – who defeated Peter Ebdon 6–3 to reach the third round.

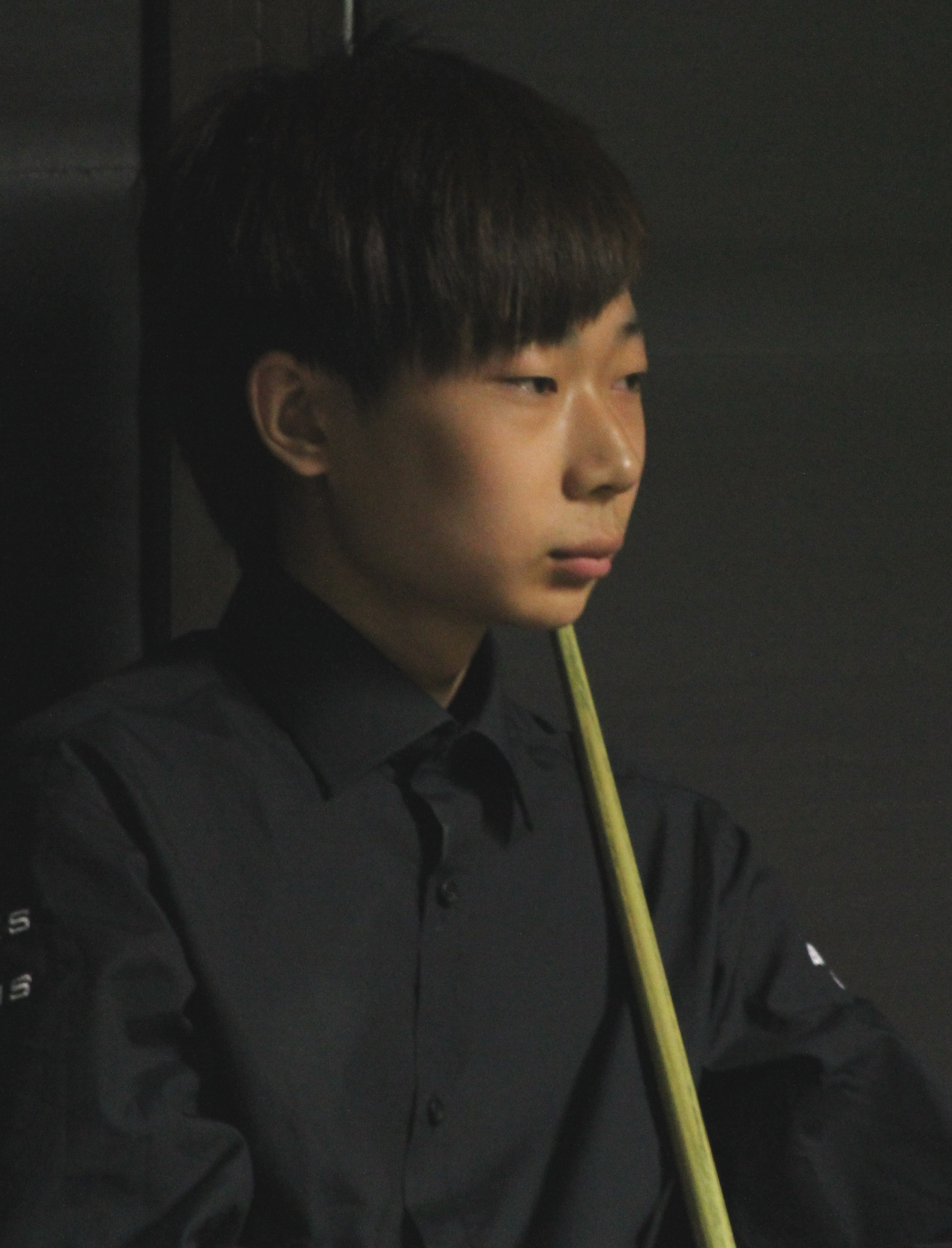
Lyu Haotian ranked 104 defeated Marco Fu, Anthony Hamilton and Peter Ebdon to reach the fourth round.

Round three was played between the remaining 32 players, from 4–5 December 2017, seeing more top 16 players be defeated. Graeme Dott (30) overcame Judd Trump (3) 6–2, despite trailing 2–0. Dott compiled five 50+ breaks, and won the next six frames. Hoatian who had defeated Hamilton and Ebdon in prior round, defeated Marco Fu (8) 6–4. Both Neil Robertson (9) and Mark Williams (16) were also defeated at this stage, 5–6. Robertson was defeated by Mark Joyce (41), and caused him to miss the 2018 Masters, after dropping out of the top 16, thanks to the loss. Sunny Akani (87) whitewashed Barry Hawkins (10) 6–0, with Hawkins commenting after the match that he was "in a state of shock" with the result, commenting on both Akani's performance, and the poor playing conditions. Williams lost to fellow Welshman Ryan Day (17), having been ahead at 4–1.

Round four saw the remaining sixteen players play from 6–7 December 2017. Only four top 16 seeded players reached the last 16 of the tournament – John Higgins (4), Shaun Murphy (5), Mark Allen (6) and Ronnie O'Sullivan (7). This was the fewest top 16 seeds to reach that stage in the tournament's 40-year history. Higgins played Mark King (21), where he was defeated 5–6. King trailed at both 2–4, and 4–5 but won the match despite making a highest break of just 69. Murphy would defeat Ricky Walden 6–1, with Walden only winning frame four. Mark Allen lost to Joe Perry (22) 6–4. O'Sullivan played Sunny Akani in this round, winning the match 6–5, despite being 4–5 behind. O'Sullivan commented after the match that he felt as though he had "robbed" Akani of the win, describing him as being unlucky.

=== Later stages (quarter-finals–final) ===
The quarter-finals took place on 8 December 2017 on two tables. Shaun Murphy completed a 6–1 victory over Mark King. Post-match, both Murphy and King commented on the audience, with a man being removed for snoring and a woman for talking during the match. Ronnie O'Sullivan defeated Martin Gould 6–3, after leading 5–0.

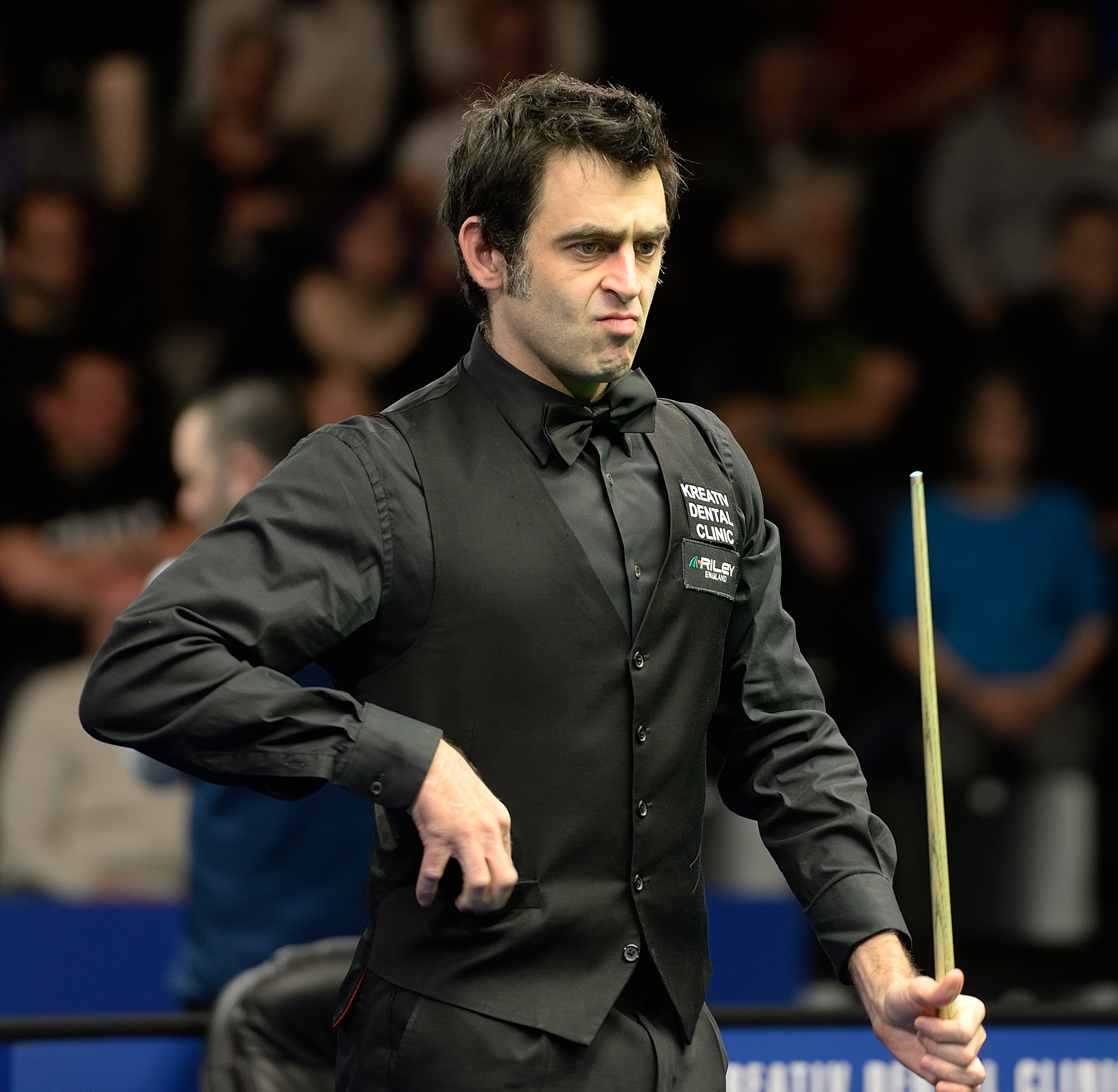
O'Sullivan won the event, defeating Shaun Murphy in the final 10–5, winning the last five frames in a row.

Stephen Maguire defeated Joe Perry 6–3 to set up a semi-final match with O'Sullivan, in a repeat of the 2007 UK Championship final. After beating Maguire in 2007, O'Sullivan commented that Maguire would "dominate for a decade". Reacting to the match from 10 years prior, Maguire stated that O'Sullivan "talks some bollocks", having not dominated the game since that match. Ryan Day also overcame Mark Joyce in a deciding frame 6–5.

The semi-finals were played on 9 December 2017. The first semi-final saw O'Sullivan defeat Maguire 6–4. O'Sullivan took a 4–0 lead at the interval, before Maguire won four of the next five frames, with O'Sullivan winning the match in frame ten. The second semi-final saw Shaun Murphy overcome Ryan Day 6–3. Murphy would take a 5–1 lead, before losing the next two frames, and winning the match in frame nine.

The final was played as best of 19 frames, over two sessions on 10 December 2017. Both O'Sullivan and Murphy had met in the final of the 2017 Champion of Champions the month prior, with Murphy winning 10–8. Murphy and O'Sullivan would share the first session 4–4, despite Murphy being behind at 2–4. In the second session, O'Sullivan put together six 50+ breaks including two centuries to win six of the next seven frames to win the match 10–5, winning five frames in a row.

Post match, pundit John Parrott described O'Sullivan as "a genius of a juggernaut", commenting on the impressiveness of the clinical win. The win would be O'Sullivan's sixth UK Championship victory equalling that achieved by Steve Davis, and his 18th Triple Crown victory overall, equalling the record set by Stephen Hendry.

== Main draw ==
Below is the results for the tournament. Players in bold denote winners of matches. The player's seedings are based on the player's world ranking prior to the tournament.

=== Top half ===
==== Section 1 ====
Last 128; Best of 11 frames
1	**Mark Selby** (ENG)	**6**
128	Basem Eltahhan (EGY)	4
64	**Scott Donaldson** (SCO)	**6**
65	John Astley (ENG)	2
32	**Li Hang** (CHN)	**6**
97	Gerard Greene (NIR)	1
33	**Robert Milkins** (ENG)	**6**
96	Chen Zhe (CHN)	1
16	**Mark Williams** (WAL)	**6**
113	Paul Davison (ENG)	0
49	**Andrew Higginson** (ENG)	**6**
80	Sam Craigie (ENG)	0
17	**Ryan Day** (WAL)	**6**
112	Jamie Curtis-Barrett (ENG)	0
48	**Thepchaiya Un-Nooh** (THA)	**6**
81	Elliot Slessor (ENG)	5

Last 64; Best of 11 frames
1	(England) Mark Selby	3
64	(Scotland) **Scott Donaldson**	**6**
32	(China) **Li Hang**	**6**
33	(England) Robert Milkins	4
16	(Wales) **Mark Williams**	**6**
49	(England) Andrew Higginson	2
17	(Wales) **Ryan Day**	**6**
48	(Thailand) Thepchaiya Un-Nooh	3

Last 32; Best of 11 frames
64	(Scotland) Scott Donaldson	1
32	(China) **Li Hang**	**6**
16	(Wales) Mark Williams	5
17	(Wales) **Ryan Day**	**6**

Last 16; Best of 11 frames
32	(China) Li Hang	5
17	(Wales) **Ryan Day**	**6**

==== Section 2 ====
Last 128; Best of 11 frames
41	**Mark Joyce** (ENG)	**6**
88	Thor Chuan Leong (MAS)	3
24	**David Gilbert** (ENG)	**6**
105	Christopher Keogan (ENG)	4
56	Gary Wilson (ENG)	3
73	**Ken Doherty** (IRL)	**6**
9	**Neil Robertson** (AUS)	**6**
120	Rod Lawler (ENG)	1
40	**Peter Ebdon** (ENG)	**6**
89	Allan Taylor (ENG)	3
25	Anthony Hamilton (ENG)	1
104	**Lyu Haotian** (CHN)	**6**
57	Rory McLeod (ENG)	5
72	**Zhao Xintong** (CHN)	**6**
8	**Marco Fu** (HKG)	**6**
121	Nigel Bond (ENG)	2

Last 64; Best of 11 frames
41	(England) **Mark Joyce**	**6**
24	(England) David Gilbert	4
73	(Republic of Ireland) Ken Doherty	2
9	(Australia) **Neil Robertson**	**6**
40	(England) Peter Ebdon	3
104	(China) **Lyu Haotian**	**6**
72	(China) Zhao Xintong	4
8	(Hong Kong) **Marco Fu**	**6**

Last 32; Best of 11 frames
41	(England) **Mark Joyce**	**6**
9	(Australia) Neil Robertson	5
104	(China) **Lyu Haotian**	**6**
8	(Hong Kong) Marco Fu	4

Last 16; Best of 11 frames
41	(England) **Mark Joyce**	**6**
104	(China) Lyu Haotian	4

==== Section 3 ====
Last 128; Best of 11 frames
5	**Shaun Murphy** (ENG)	**6**
124	Hamza Akbar (PAK)	1
60	Daniel Wells (WAL)	4
69	**Liam Highfield** (ENG)	**6**
28	**Alan McManus** (SCO)	**6**
101	Robin Hull (FIN)	3
37	**Jimmy Robertson** (ENG)	**6**
92	Alex Borg (MLT)	1
12	**Kyren Wilson** (ENG)	**6**
117	Sean O'Sullivan (ENG)	1
53	**Yu Delu** (CHN)	**6**
76	Ian Preece (WAL)	2
21	**Ricky Walden** (ENG)	**6**
108	Duane Jones (WAL)	1
44	**Jamie Jones** (WAL)	**6**
85	Craig Steadman (ENG)	3

Last 64; Best of 11 frames
5	(England) **Shaun Murphy**	**6**
69	(England) Liam Highfield	5
28	(Scotland) Alan McManus	5
37	(England) **Jimmy Robertson**	**6**
12	(England) **Kyren Wilson**	**6**
53	(China) Yu Delu	4
21	(England) **Ricky Walden**	**6**
44	(Wales) Jamie Jones	5

Last 32; Best of 11 frames
5	(England) **Shaun Murphy**	**6**
37	(England) Jimmy Robertson	3
12	(England) Kyren Wilson	2
21	(England) **Ricky Walden**	**6**

Last 16; Best of 11 frames
5	(England) **Shaun Murphy**	**6**
21	(England) Ricky Walden	1

==== Section 4 ====
Last 128; Best of 11 frames
45	**Mike Dunn** (ENG)	**6**
84	Fang Xiongman (CHN)	2
20	**Mark King** (ENG)	**6**
109	Boonyarit Keattikun (THA)	0
52	Sam Baird (ENG)	5
77	**Aditya Mehta** (IND)	**6**
13	**Luca Brecel** (BEL)	**6**
116	Soheil Vahedi (IRN)	4
36	**Yan Bingtao** (CHN)	**6**
93	Zhang Yong (CHN)	1
29	**Ben Woollaston** (ENG)	**6**
100	Li Yuan (CHN)	2
61	Tian Pengfei (CHN)	5
68	**Cao Yupeng** (CHN)	**6**
4	**John Higgins** (SCO)	**6**
125	Chris Totten (SCO)	1

Last 64; Best of 11 frames
45	(England) Mike Dunn	4
20	(England) **Mark King**	**6**
77	(India) Aditya Mehta	3
13	(Belgium) **Luca Brecel**	**6**
36	(China) **Yan Bingtao**	**6**
29	(England) Ben Woollaston	1
68	(China) Cao Yupeng	4
4	(Scotland) **John Higgins**	**6**

Last 32; Best of 11 frames
20	(England) **Mark King**	**6**
13	(Belgium) Luca Brecel	3
36	(China) Yan Bingtao	3
4	(Scotland) **John Higgins**	**6**

Last 16; Best of 11 frames
20	(England) **Mark King**	**6**
4	(Scotland) John Higgins	5

=== Bottom half ===
==== Section 5 ====
Last 128; Best of 11 frames
3	**Judd Trump** (ENG)	**6**
126	Matthew Bolton (AUS)	0
62	**Chris Wakelin** (ENG)	**6**
67	Lee Walker (WAL)	1
30	**Graeme Dott** (SCO)	**6**
99	Josh Boileau (IRL)	2
35	**Dominic Dale** (WAL)	**6**
94	Adam Duffy (ENG)	0
14	**Liang Wenbo** (CHN)	**6**
115	Sanderson Lam (ENG)	1
51	Stuart Carrington (ENG)	2
78	**Mitchell Mann** (ENG)	**6**
19	**Stephen Maguire** (SCO)	**6**
110	Yuan Sijun (CHN)	1
46	David Grace (ENG)	4
83	**Jak Jones** (WAL)	**6**

Last 64; Best of 11 frames
3	(England) **Judd Trump**	**6**
62	(England) Chris Wakelin	0
30	(Scotland) **Graeme Dott**	**6**
35	(Wales) Dominic Dale	5
14	(China) **Liang Wenbo**	**6**
78	(England) Mitchell Mann	1
19	(Scotland) **Stephen Maguire**	**6**
83	(Wales) Jak Jones	0

Last 32; Best of 11 frames
3	(England) Judd Trump	2
30	(Scotland) **Graeme Dott**	**6**
14	(China) Liang Wenbo	5
19	(Scotland) **Stephen Maguire**	**6**

Last 16; Best of 11 frames
30	(Scotland) Graeme Dott	2
19	(Scotland) **Stephen Maguire**	**6**

==== Section 6 ====
Last 128; Best of 11 frames
43	**Jack Lisowski** (ENG)	**6**
86	Wang Yuchen (CHN)	4
22	**Joe Perry** (ENG)	**6**
107	Billy Joe Castle (ENG)	1
54	**Kurt Maflin** (NOR)	**6**
75	Alexander Ursenbacher (SUI)	1
11	Ali Carter (ENG)	2
118	**Jimmy White** (ENG)	**6**
38	Mark Davis (ENG)	5
91	**Xu Si** (CHN)	**6**
27	Zhou Yuelong (CHN)	5
102	**Peter Lines** (ENG)	**6**
59	**Oliver Lines** (ENG)	**6**
70	Mei Xiwen (CHN)	3
6	**Mark Allen** (NIR)	**6**
123	Lukas Kleckers (GER)	2

Last 64; Best of 11 frames
43	(England) Jack Lisowski	3
22	(England) **Joe Perry**	**6**
54	(Norway) **Kurt Maflin**	**6**
118	(England) Jimmy White	2
91	(China) Xu Si	2
102	(England) **Peter Lines**	**6**
59	(England) Oliver Lines	4
6	(Northern Ireland) **Mark Allen**	**6**

Last 32; Best of 11 frames
22	(England) **Joe Perry**	**6**
54	(Norway) Kurt Maflin	3
102	(England) Peter Lines	4
6	(Northern Ireland) **Mark Allen**	**6**

Last 16; Best of 11 frames
22	(England) **Joe Perry**	**6**
6	(Northern Ireland) Mark Allen	4

==== Section 7 ====
Last 128; Best of 11 frames
7	**Ronnie O'Sullivan** (ENG)	**6**
A	Jackson Page (WAL)	3
58	Alfie Burden (ENG)	5
71	**Michael Georgiou** (CYP)	**6**
26	**Michael White** (WAL)	**6**
103	Ross Muir (SCO)	5
39	**Matthew Selt** (ENG)	**6**
90	Ian Burns (ENG)	2
10	**Barry Hawkins** (ENG)	**6**
119	Kurt Dunham (AUS)	1
55	Matthew Stevens (WAL)	3
74	**Hammad Miah** (ENG)	**6**
23	**Michael Holt** (ENG)	**6**
106	Niu Zhuang (CHN)	5
42	Fergal O'Brien (IRL)	5
87	**Sunny Akani** (THA)	**6**

Last 64; Best of 11 frames
7	(England) **Ronnie O'Sullivan**	**6**
71	(Cyprus) Michael Georgiou	1
26	(Wales) **Michael White**	**6**
39	(England) Matthew Selt	1
10	(England) **Barry Hawkins**	**6**
74	(England) Hammad Miah	2
23	(England) Michael Holt	4
87	(Thailand) **Sunny Akani**	**6**

Last 32; Best of 11 frames
7	(England) **Ronnie O'Sullivan**	**6**
26	(Wales) Michael White	1
10	(England) Barry Hawkins	0
87	(Thailand) **Sunny Akani**	**6**

Last 16; Best of 11 frames
7	(England) **Ronnie O'Sullivan**	**6**
87	(Thailand) Sunny Akani	5

==== Section 8 ====
Last 128; Best of 11 frames
47	**Robbie Williams** (ENG)	**6**
82	Martin O'Donnell (ENG)	3
18	**Martin Gould** (ENG)	**6**
111	Joe Swail (NIR)	3
50	**Hossein Vafaei** (IRN)	**6**
79	James Wattana (THA)	4
15	**Anthony McGill** (SCO)	**6**
114	Ashley Hugill (ENG)	2
34	**Xiao Guodong** (CHN)	**6**
95	Chen Zifan (CHN)	0
31	**Tom Ford** (ENG)	**6**
98	Eden Sharav (SCO)	1
63	**Noppon Saengkham** (THA)	**6**
66	Zhang Anda (CHN)	2
2	Ding Junhui (CHN)	5
127	**Leo Fernandez** (IRL)	**6**

Last 64; Best of 11 frames
47	(England) Robbie Williams	2
18	(England) **Martin Gould**	**6**
50	(Iran) **Hossein Vafaei**	**6**
15	(Scotland) Anthony McGill	5
34	(China) **Xiao Guodong**	**6**
31	(England) Tom Ford	1
63	(Thailand) **Noppon Saengkham**	**6**
127	(Republic of Ireland) Leo Fernandez	0

Last 32; Best of 11 frames
18	(England) **Martin Gould**	**6**
50	(Iran) Hossein Vafaei	4
34	(China) **Xiao Guodong**	**6**
63	(Thailand) Noppon Saengkham	3

Last 16; Best of 11 frames
18	(England) **Martin Gould**	**6**
34	(China) Xiao Guodong	4

=== Finals ===
**Quarter-finals**; Best of 11 frames
17	(Wales) **Ryan Day**	**6**
41	(England) Mark Joyce	5
5	(England) **Shaun Murphy**	**6**
20	(England) Mark King	1
19	(Scotland) **Stephen Maguire**	**6**
22	(England) Joe Perry	3
7	(England) **Ronnie O'Sullivan**	**6**
18	(England) Martin Gould	3

**Semi-finals**; Best of 11 frames
17	(Wales) Ryan Day	3
5	(England) **Shaun Murphy**	**6**
19	(Scotland) Stephen Maguire	4
7	(England) **Ronnie O'Sullivan**	**6**

**Final**; Best of 19 frames
5	(England) Shaun Murphy	5
7	(England) **Ronnie O'Sullivan**	**10**

=== Final ===
Final: Best of 19 frames. Referee: Paul Collier. Barbican Centre, York, England, 10 December 2017.
Shaun Murphy (5); England	5–**10**	**Ronnie O'Sullivan** (7); England
Afternoon: **124**–0 (123), 39–**83** (62), 9–**108** (103), **76**–62 (O'Sullivan 62), 18–**72**, 48–**57**, **70**–27 (69), **60**–57 (52, 52); Evening: 1–**75** (75), **84**–32 (80), 0–**104** (104), 0–**84** (76), 18–**103** (103), 49–**86** (86), 0–**108** (59)
**123**	Highest break	104
1	Century breaks	**3**
4	50+ breaks	**10**

== Century breaks ==
A total of 99 breaks were made at the event, the highest of which – a 142 – was made by Michael White in the second round.

- 142, 103 – Michael White
- 138, 128, 122, 111, 110 – Ryan Day
- 137, 128, 114 – Joe Perry
- 137 – Judd Trump
- 135, 134, 127, 119, 104, 101, 100 – Mark Allen
- 135, 129, 123, 114, 104 – Shaun Murphy
- 135, 108, 101 – Martin Gould
- 134, 120, 108 – Li Hang
- 134, 103 – Yan Bingtao
- 134, 101 – Mark King
- 132, 121, 117, 111, 107, 106, 105, 104, 103, 103 – Ronnie O'Sullivan
- 130, 112, 110 – Liang Wenbo
- 130, 106, 101 – Mark Joyce
- 130 – Dominic Dale
- 129, 128, 127, 117, 116 – Stephen Maguire
- 129, 128, 126, 124, 118, 105, 102, 101 – Neil Robertson
- 129, 117 – Scott Donaldson
- 129 – Chris Wakelin
- 128 – Jimmy White
- 128 – Sunny Akani
- 124 – Jack Lisowski
- 123 – Martin O'Donnell
- 121, 107, 106 – Lyu Haotian
- 121 – Tom Ford
- 120 – Robbie Williams
- 118, 116 – Ricky Walden
- 117 – Daniel Wells
- 115 – Xu Si
- 114, 107 – Luca Brecel
- 113 – Matthew Selt
- 110, 108, 105 – Anthony McGill
- 110 – Marco Fu
- 109 – Noppon Saengkham
- 109 – Fergal O'Brien
- 108, 101 – Kyren Wilson
- 108 – Yu Delu
- 108 – Kurt Maflin
- 105 – Ashley Hugill
- 103 – Niu Zhuang
- 102, 101 – David Gilbert
- 102 – Mark Williams
- 101 – Peter Ebdon
- 101 – Wang Yuchen

== Sponsorship and broadcasting ==
The event was sponsored by betting company Betway, sponsors of the UK Championship since 2015. The tournament's broadcasters were dependent on country, with the BBC and Eurosport televising across the United Kingdom and Europe respectively. The event was broadcast in China by Superstars Online, and China Central Television. In Hong Kong, NowTV simulcasted the event with additional commentary.
