= 2018 WSF Championship =

2018 Amateur Snooker tournament

WSF Championship
Tournament information
- Dates: 18–24 March 2018
- Venue: Dolmen Hotel Malta
- City: Qawra
- Country: Malta
- Organisation: WSF
- Total prize fund: €28,300
- Winner's share: €10,300
- Highest break: (Brazil) Igor Figueiredo (131)

Final
- Champion: (China) Luo Honghao
- Runner-up: (Poland) Adam Stefanow
- Score: 6–0

The 2018 WSF Championship was the first edition of the WSF Championship, an amateur snooker tournament that took place from 18 March to 24 March 2018 in Qawra, Malta. It was the first edition of the WSF Championships and also doubled as a qualification event for the World Snooker Tour. The best four players (all semi-finalists) received an invitation to compete in the 2018 World Snooker Championship. Two best players (both finalists) received a Main Tour Card for the 2018/2019 season.

The tournament was televised in Malta by TVM2.

== Prize fund ==
The breakdown of the tournament prizes is shown below:

- Winner: €10,000
- Runner-up: €4,000
- Semi-finalist: €1,800
- Quarter-finalist: €1,000
- Last 16: €400
- Last 32: €200
- Highest break: €300
- Total: €28,300

== Results ==
=== Group A ===
The following is the results from the Groups.

Place	Player	Frames won	Frames lost	Difference
1	(Scotland) Michael Collumb	12	3	9
2	(Poland) Marcin Nitschke	10	4	6
3	(Belgium) Cedric Van Wassenhove	7	9	−2
4	(Malta) Joseph Casha	4	9	−5
5	(Thailand) Waratthanun Sukritthanes	4	12	−8

=== Group B ===
Place	Player	Frames won	Frames lost	Difference
1	(England) David Lilley	12	0	12
2	(Singapore) Marvin Lim Chun Kiat	9	6	3
3	(Jersey) Ross Symes	8	8	0
4	(Malta) Mario Brincat	5	9	−4
5	(Brazil) Alessandro Maciel	1	12	−11

=== Group C ===
Place	Player	Frames won	Frames lost	Difference
1	(Iceland) Kristján Helgason	12	1	11
2	(Australia) Ryan Thomerson	10	5	5
3	(Israel) Tom Limor	7	7	0
4	(Belgium) Laurens de Staelen	4	12	−8
5	(Malta) John Farrugia	3	11	−8

=== Group D ===
Place	Player	Frames won	Frames lost	Difference
1	(Poland) Kacper Filipiak	12	1	11
2	(Malta) Isaac Borg	8	7	1
3	(China) Gao Yang	8	8	0
4	(Finland) Patrik Tiihonen	7	10	−3
5	(Brazil) Carlos Loberto	3	12	−9

=== Group E ===
Place	Player	Frames won	Frames lost	Difference
1	(China) Luo Honghao	12	3	9
2	(Australia) Steve Mifsud	9	4	5
3	(Estonia) Andres Petrov	8	6	2
4	(Republic of Ireland) Daniel O'Regan	4	11	−7
5	(Malta) Matthew Calleja	3	12	−9

=== Group F ===
Place	Player	Frames won	Frames lost	Difference
1	(Scotland) Ross Vallance	12	0	12
2	(Wales) Alex Taubman	9	4	5
3	(Malta) Philip Ciantar	6	7	−1
4	(Thailand) Nutcharut Wongharuthai	5	9	−4
5	(Morocco) Mohammed El Idrissi	0	12	−12

=== Group G ===
Place	Player	Frames won	Frames lost	Difference
1	(Wales) Darren Morgan	12	4	8
2	(Malta) Brian Cini	11	3	8
3	(Republic of Ireland) Philip O`Connor	6	8	−2
4	(Romania) Vladu Mihai	6	11	−5
5	(Brazil) Nicolly Christo	3	12	−9

=== Group H ===
Place	Player	Frames won	Frames lost	Difference
1	(Brazil) Igor Figueiredo	9	1	8
2	(Malta) Clayton Castaldi	7	6	1
3	(Scotland) Dylan Gault	5	8	−3
4	(United Arab Emirates) Khalid Kamali	3	9	−6

=== Group I ===
Place	Player	Frames won	Frames lost	Difference
1	(Thailand) Ratchayothin Yotharuck	9	4	5
2	(Malta) Chris Peplow	9	5	4
3	(Belgium) Jeff Jacobs	9	7	2
4	(Wales) Andrew Pagett	8	8	0
5	(Morocco) Edmond Ndou	1	12	−11

=== Group J ===
Place	Player	Frames won	Frames lost	Difference
1	(Poland) Adam Stefanow	12	0	12
2	(England) Saqib Nasir	9	5	4
3	(Singapore) Ang Boon Chin	7	7	0
4	(Ukraine) Iulian Boiko	4	10	−6
5	(Morocco) Bendaoud Kamal	2	12	−10

=== Group K ===
Place	Player	Frames won	Frames lost	Difference
1	(Malta) Aaron Busuttil	7	4	3
1	(Wales) Jamie Clarke	7	4	3
3	(Sweden) Suleman Kukka Salam	6	6	0
4	(United Arab Emirates) Mohammed Al Joker	3	9	−6

=== Group L ===
Place	Player	Frames won	Frames lost	Difference
1	(Austria) Andreas Ploner	12	4	8
2	(Scotland) Fraser Patrick	10	8	2
3	(Malta) Simon Zammit	9	8	1
4	(Iceland) Jon Ingi Ægisson	6	9	−3
5	(United Arab Emirates) Saif Alketbi	4	12	−8

=== Group M ===
Place	Player	Frames won	Frames lost	Difference
1	(Wales) Kishan Hirani	12	4	8
2	(Thailand) Yuttapop Pakpoj	10	6	4
3	(Sweden) Belan Sharif	7	9	−2
4	(England) Rebecca Kenna	7	11	−4
5	(Finland) Esa Oikarinen	6	12	−6

=== Group N ===
Place	Player	Frames won	Frames lost	Difference
1	(Poland) Mateusz Baranowski	12	1	11
2	(Republic of Ireland) Noel Landers	9	7	2
3	(England) Reanne Evans	7	8	−1
4	(Qatar) Ahmed Shehab	5	11	−6
5	(Finland) Heikki Niva	4	10	−6

=== Group O ===
Place	Player	Frames won	Frames lost	Difference
1	(England) Joe O'Connor	12	3	9
2	(Poland) Grzegorz Biernadski	10	6	4
3	(Malta) Arthur Cachia	9	8	1
4	(Singapore) Benny Loh	4	9	−5
5	(Sweden) Benjamin McCabe	3	12	−9

=== Group P ===
Place	Player	Frames won	Frames lost	Difference
1	(Belgium) Kevin Hanssens	12	0	12
2	(United Arab Emirates) Saif Al Shamsi	9	5	4
3	(Malta) Frans Mintoff	7	7	0
4	(Albania) Dorjan Maknori	5	10	−5
5	(Romania) Andrei Orzan	1	12	−11

=== Group Q ===
Place	Player	Frames won	Frames lost	Difference
1	(Republic of Ireland) Michael Judge	12	2	10
2	(England) Kuldesh Johal	10	8	2
3	(Ukraine) Sergey Isaenko	7	7	0
4	(Malta) Jason Peplow	7	8	−1
5	(Israel) Shai Yair	1	12	−11

=== Group R ===
Place	Player	Frames won	Frames lost	Difference
1	(Malta) Duncan Bezzina	9	4	5
2	(Belgium) Kobe Vanoppen	9	6	3
3	(Republic of Ireland) TJ Dowling	8	6	2
4	(England) Stuart Watson	8	7	1
5	Israel Pertman	1	12	−11

=== Knockout stage ===
The following is the results from the Knockout stage.

==== Round 1 ====
Best of 7 frames

33	(Republic of Ireland) Noel Landers	0–4	32	(Scotland) Fraser Patrick
17	(Malta) Duncan Bezzina	4–0	48	(Jersey) Ross Symes
49	(Republic of Ireland) Philip O`Connor	1–4	16	(Thailand) Ratchayothin Yotharuck
41	(China) Gao Yang	1–4	24	(Australia) Steve Mifsud
25	(United Arab Emirates) Saif Al Shamsi	4–0	40	(Sweden) Suleman Kukka Salam
37	(Estonia) Andres Petrov	4–3	28	(Malta) Aaron Busuttil
21	(Poland) Marcin Nitschke	4–2	44	(Malta) Simon Zammit
54	(Belgium) Cedric Van Wassenhove	4–3	12	(England) Joe O'Connor
13	(Wales) Kishan Hirani	4–2	52	(England) Reanne Evans
45	(Malta) Frans Mintoff	2–4	20	(Malta) Brian Cini
29	(Singapore) Marvin Lim Chun Kiat	4–1	36	(Malta) Isaac Borg

35	(England) Kuldesh Johal	4–3	30	(Belgium) Kobe Vanoppen
19	(Wales) Alex Taubman	4–0	46	(Sweden) Belan Sharif
51	(Scotland) Dylan Gault	1–4	14	(Austria) Andreas Ploner
11	(Scotland) Michael Collumb	4–1	53	(Malta) Philip Ciantar
43	(Belgium) Jeff Jacobs	2–4	22	(Australia) Ryan Thomerson
27	(England) Saqib Nasir	4–0	38	(Poland) Grzegorz Biernadski
39	(Republic of Ireland) TJ Dowling	4–2	26	(Thailand) Yuttapop Pakpoj
23	(Malta) Chris Peplow	4–0	42	(Ukraine) Sergey Isaenko
15	(Wales) Darren Morgan	4–1	50	(Israel) Tom Limor
47	(Singapore) Ang Boon Chin	1–4	18	(Wales) Jamie Clarke
31	(Malta) Clayton Castaldi	4–1	34	(Malta) Arthur Cachia

==== Other rounds ====
Round 2 Best of 7 frames
1	(Poland) Adam Stefanow	4
32	(Scotland) Fraser Patrick	1
17	(Malta) Duncan Bezzina	4
16	(Thailand) Ratchayothin Yotharuck	2
9	(Republic of Ireland) Michael Judge	4
24	(Australia) Steve Mifsud	2
25	(United Arab Emirates) Saif Al Shamsi	0
8	(Brazil) Igor Figueiredo	4
5	(Iceland) Kristján Helgason	4
37	(Estonia) Andres Petrov	0
21	(Poland) Marcin Nitschke	4
54	(Belgium) Cedric Van Wassenhove	0
13	(Wales) Kishan Hirani	4
20	(Malta) Brian Cini	2
29	(Singapore) Marvin Lim Chun Kiat	4
4	(Scotland) Ross Vallance	2
3	(England) David Lilley	2
35	(England) Kuldesh Johal	4
19	(Wales) Alex Taubman	4
14	(Austria) Andreas Ploner	1
11	(Scotland) Michael Collumb	4
22	(Australia) Ryan Thomerson	1
27	(England) Saqib Nasir	0
6	(Poland) Kacper Filipiak	4
7	(Poland) Mateusz Baranowski	1
39	(Republic of Ireland) TJ Dowling	4
23	(Malta) Chris Peplow	0
10	(China) Luo Honghao	4
15	(Wales) Darren Morgan	2
18	(Wales) Jamie Clarke	4
31	(Malta) Clayton Castaldi	1
2	(Belgium) Kevin Hanssens	4

Round 3 Best of 7 frames
1	(Poland) Adam Stefanow	4
17	(Malta) Duncan Bezzina	1
9	(Republic of Ireland) Michael Judge	2
8	(Brazil) Igor Figueiredo	4
5	(Iceland) Kristján Helgason	4
21	(Poland) Marcin Nitschke	0
13	(Wales) Kishan Hirani	4
29	(Singapore) Marvin Lim Chun Kiat	3
35	(England) Kuldesh Johal	3
19	(Wales) Alex Taubman	4
11	(Scotland) Michael Collumb	0
6	(Poland) Kacper Filipiak	4
39	(Republic of Ireland) TJ Dowling	0
10	(China) Luo Honghao	4
18	(Wales) Jamie Clarke	4
2	(Belgium) Kevin Hanssens	3

Quarter-Finals; Best of 7 frames
1	(Poland) Adam Stefanow	4
8	(Brazil) Igor Figueiredo	2
5	(Iceland) Kristján Helgason	4
13	(Wales) Kishan Hirani	2
19	(Wales) Alex Taubman	1
6	(Poland) Kacper Filipiak	4
10	(China) Luo Honghao	4
18	(Wales) Jamie Clarke	0

Semi-Finals; Best of 7 frames
1	(Poland) Adam Stefanow	4
5	(Iceland) Kristján Helgason	3
6	(Poland) Kacper Filipiak	3
10	(China) Luo Honghao	4

Final; Best of 11 frames
1	(Poland) Adam Stefanow	0
10	(China) Luo Honghao	6

== Century breaks ==
Total: 10

- 131, 125, 107 – Igor Figueiredo
- 130, 124, 119, 101, 100 – Kristján Helgason
- 127 – Luo Honghao
- 103 – Adam Stefanow
