= WSF Championship =

Snooker tournament

World Snooker Federation Championship
- Sport: Snooker
- First season: 2018
- Organising body: World Snooker Federation
- Website: https://worldsnookerfederation.org/wsf-events/

The World Snooker Federation Championship, simply known as the WSF Championship, is an annual amateur snooker tournament held by the World Snooker Federation. There are currently three categories of events: the Open Championship for all ages and genders, the under-19 Junior Championship and the WWS-ranked Women's Championship. The winners of the Open and Junior Championship are promoted to the World Snooker Tour.

== History ==
In 2017, the World Professional Billiards and Snooker Association (WPBSA) launched the World Snooker Federation (WSF), bringing together professional and amateur players, with an ambition to have the sport included in the Olympic and Paralympic games. WSF competitions also provide a pathway for players to join the World Snooker Tour.

The inaugural WSF Championship was held from 18 to 24 March 2018 in Qawra, Malta. The two finalists received a Main Tour Card for the 2018/2019 season while the four semi-finalists received an invitation to compete in the 2018 World Snooker Championship. Prize money for the event was €28,300. Luo Honghao won the event, beating Adam Stefanów in the final with Kristján Helgason and Kacper Filipiak as the losing semifinalists.

The WSF Open and WSF Junior Open tournaments were established in 2020.

In 2024, Ka Wai Cheung defeated Gao Yang 5–0 in the final to secure the title and his status as a main tour professional for the first time.

The competition saw the addition of the Women's event for the first time in 2025; it was held along with the Open and Junior events in Morocco.

== Results ==
Results of WSF finals are shown below.

=== WSF Open Championship ===
Year	Host	Winner	Score	Finalist	Semifinalists
2018	(Malta) Qawra	(China) Luo Honghao	6–0	(Poland) Adam Stefanów	(Poland) Kacper Filipiak
2018	(Malta) Qawra	(China) Luo Honghao	6–0	(Poland) Adam Stefanów	(Iceland) Kristján Helgason
2020	(Malta) Ħamrun	(England) Ashley Hugill	5–3	(Ukraine) Iulian Boiko	(Wales) Dylan Emery
2020	(Malta) Ħamrun	(England) Ashley Hugill	5–3	(Ukraine) Iulian Boiko	(Scotland) Ross Muir
2022	(England) Sheffield	(China) Si Jiahui	5–0	(England) Lee Stephens	(Wales) Michael White
2022	(England) Sheffield	(China) Si Jiahui	5–0	(England) Lee Stephens	(Wales) Daniel Wells
2023	(Australia) Sydney	(China) Ma Hailong	5–0	(England) Stan Moody	(China) Gao Yang
2023	(Australia) Sydney	(China) Ma Hailong	5–0	(England) Stan Moody	(Wales) Liam Davies
2024	(Albania) Golem	(Hong Kong) Cheung Ka Wai	5–0	(China) Gao Yang	(Ukraine) Iulian Boiko
2024	(Albania) Golem	(Hong Kong) Cheung Ka Wai	5–0	(China) Gao Yang	(England) Daniel Womersley
2025	(Morocco) Saïdia	(China) Gao Yang	5–3	(Malta) Brian Cini	(Northern Ireland) Fergal Quinn
2025	(Morocco) Saïdia	(China) Gao Yang	5–3	(Malta) Brian Cini	(Poland) Mateusz Baranowski
2026	(Bulgaria) Sofia	(England) Hammad Miah	5–4	(China) Wang Xinbo	(England) Ryan Davies
2026	(Bulgaria) Sofia	(England) Hammad Miah	5–4	(China) Wang Xinbo	(England) Stuart Carrington

=== WSF Junior Championship ===
Year	Host	Winner	Score	Finalist	Semifinalists
2020; Under-17	(Malta) Ħamrun	(China) Gao Yang	5–2	(England) Sean Maddocks	(China) Wu Yize
2020; Under-17	(Malta) Ħamrun	(China) Gao Yang	5–2	(England) Sean Maddocks	(Republic of Ireland) Aaron Hill
2022; Under-18	(England) Sheffield	(Ukraine) Anton Kazakov	5–3	(England) Jake Crofts	(Wales) Liam Davies
2022; Under-18	(England) Sheffield	(Ukraine) Anton Kazakov	5–3	(England) Jake Crofts	(Belgium) Yorrit Hoes
2023; Under-18	(Australia) Sydney	(England) Stan Moody	5–1	(England) Liam Pullen	(Ukraine) Iulian Boiko
2023; Under-18	(Australia) Sydney	(England) Stan Moody	5–1	(England) Liam Pullen	(Latvia) Filips Kalniņš
2024; Under-19	(Albania) Golem	(Hungary) Bulcsú Révész	5–3	(China) Gong Chenzhi	(Pakistan) Hamza Ilyas
2024; Under-19	(Albania) Golem	(Hungary) Bulcsú Révész	5–3	(China) Gong Chenzhi	(England) Oliver Sykes
2025; Under-19	(Morocco) Saïdia	(Republic of Ireland) Leone Crowley	5–0	(England) Kaylan Patel	(China) Zhou Jinhao
2025; Under-19	(Morocco) Saïdia	(Republic of Ireland) Leone Crowley	5–0	(England) Kaylan Patel	(Scotland) Amaan Iqbal
2026; Under-19	(Bulgaria) Sofia	(Ukraine) Mykhailo Larkov	5–2	(China) Wang Xinbo	(Thailand) Prin Ratmukda
2026; Under-19	(Bulgaria) Sofia	(Ukraine) Mykhailo Larkov	5–2	(China) Wang Xinbo	(England) Daniel Boyes

=== WSF Women's Championship ===
Year	Host	Winner	Score	Finalist	Semifinalists
2025	(Morocco) Saïdia	(Thailand) Mink Nutcharut	4–3	(China) Bai Yulu	(England) Rebecca Kenna
2025	(Morocco) Saïdia	(Thailand) Mink Nutcharut	4–3	(China) Bai Yulu	(Hong Kong) Ng On Yee
2026	(Bulgaria) Sofia	(China) Bai Yulu	4–0	(Hong Kong) Ng On Yee	(Thailand) Panchaya Channoi
2026	(Bulgaria) Sofia	(China) Bai Yulu	4–0	(Hong Kong) Ng On Yee	(Thailand) Narucha Phoemphul

=== WSF Seniors Championship (discontinued) ===
Year	Host	Winner	Score	Finalist	Semifinalists
2018	(Malta) Ħamrun	(Brazil) Igor Figueiredo	5–3	(Wales) Darren Morgan	(Republic of Ireland) Michael Judge
2018	(Malta) Ħamrun	(Brazil) Igor Figueiredo	5–3	(Wales) Darren Morgan	(United Arab Emirates) Mohammed Shehab

== See also ==
- IBSF World Snooker Championship
- WPBSA Q Tour
