= 2018 China Open (snooker) =

China Open
Tournament information
- Dates: 2–8 April 2018
- Venue: Olympic Sports Center Gymnasium
- City: Beijing
- Country: China
- Organisation: World Snooker
- Format: Ranking event
- Total prize fund: £1,000,000
- Winner's share: £225,000
- Highest break: Ronnie O'Sullivan (ENG) (147); Stuart Bingham (ENG) (147)

Final
- Champion: Mark Selby (ENG)
- Runner-up: Barry Hawkins (ENG)
- Score: 11–3

The 2018 Fuhua Group China Open was a professional ranking snooker tournament, taking place from 2–8 April 2018 in Beijing, China. It was the nineteenth and penultimate ranking event of the 2017/2018 season.

Defending champion Mark Selby retained his title with an 11–3 final win against Barry Hawkins. By winning this tournament, Selby ensured that he will end a seventh consecutive season as world number one, regardless of his result in the 2018 World Championship.

Selby's 141 break in his last 64 match against Scott Donaldson was the fourth 16-red clearance in a professional tournament.

Ronnie O'Sullivan made his 14th maximum break in professional competition in the 5th frame of his last 64 match against Elliot Slessor. The following day, Stuart Bingham made his fourth maximum break in professional competition in the 7th frame of his last 32 match against Ricky Walden. These were the 137th and 138th official maximum breaks in professional competition. It was only the second time that two 147s were made at the main stage of a professional ranking event, the first time being at the 2008 World Championship.

== Prize fund ==
The breakdown of prize money is shown below.

- Winner: £225,000
- Runner-up: £90,000
- Semi-final: £45,000
- Quarter-final: £27,000
- Last 16: £18,000
- Last 32: £11,000
- Last 64: £5,000
- Televised highest break: £7,000
- Total: £1,000,000

The "rolling 147 prize" for a maximum break stood at £35,000.

== Main draw ==
Last 64; Best of 11 frames
(England) Mark Selby	6
(Scotland) Scott Donaldson	4
(England) Ben Woollaston	6
(Wales) Lee Walker	5
(China) Lyu Haotian	6
(England) Liam Highfield	4
(Scotland) Stephen Maguire	5
(Republic of Ireland) Fergal O'Brien	6
(England) Mark Davis	4
(England) Michael Holt	6
(Thailand) Thepchaiya Un-Nooh	1
(Wales) Mark Williams	6
(Norway) Kurt Maflin	5
(China) Yan Bingtao	6
(Thailand) Noppon Saengkham	1
(Northern Ireland) Mark Allen	6
(Scotland) John Higgins	6
(England) Martin O'Donnell	2
(England) Anthony Hamilton	1
(England) Jack Lisowski	6
(England) Ali Carter	4
(England) Gary Wilson	6
(England) Joe Perry	6
(Scotland) Chris Totten	0
(England) Peter Ebdon	5
(England) Mark King	6
(England) Andrew Higginson	3
(England) Kyren Wilson	6
(England) Jimmy Robertson	5
(China) Xiao Guodong	6
(England) Craig Steadman	4
(China) Ding Junhui	6
(Wales) Jak Jones	6
(England) Nigel Bond	5
(China) Zhou Yuelong	6
(China) Chen Zhe	2
(Australia) Neil Robertson	6
(England) Robbie Williams	3
(England) Martin Gould	4
(England) Sam Craigie	6
(Pakistan) Hamza Akbar	0
(England) Ricky Walden	6
(Wales) Matthew Stevens	5
(England) Stuart Bingham	6
(England) Mark Joyce	2
(Scotland) Graeme Dott	6
(England) Chris Wakelin	6
(England) Shaun Murphy	0
(England) Barry Hawkins	6
(England) Sam Baird	3
(Wales) Michael White	6
(England) Paul Davison	5
(Belgium) Luca Brecel	4
(China) Cao Yupeng	6
(England) David Gilbert	6
(England) Mike Dunn	3
(Wales) Duane Jones	6
(China) Liang Wenbo	5
(China) Luo Honghao	6
(Scotland) Anthony McGill	4
(England) Tom Ford	6
(China) Yuan Sijun	2
(England) Elliot Slessor	6
(England) Ronnie O'Sullivan	2

Last 32; Best of 11 frames
(England) Mark Selby	6
(England) Ben Woollaston	3
(China) Lyu Haotian	6
(Republic of Ireland) Fergal O'Brien	5
(England) Michael Holt	1
(Wales) Mark Williams	6
(China) Yan Bingtao	4
(Northern Ireland) Mark Allen	6
(Scotland) John Higgins	2
(England) Jack Lisowski	6
(England) Gary Wilson	6
(England) Joe Perry	4
(England) Mark King	4
(England) Kyren Wilson	6
(China) Xiao Guodong	2
(China) Ding Junhui	6
(Wales) Jak Jones	2
(China) Zhou Yuelong	6
(Australia) Neil Robertson	6
(England) Sam Craigie	5
(England) Ricky Walden	5
(England) Stuart Bingham	6
(Scotland) Graeme Dott	6
(England) Chris Wakelin	3
(England) Barry Hawkins	6
(Wales) Michael White	1
(China) Cao Yupeng	6
(England) David Gilbert	2
(Wales) Duane Jones	5
(China) Luo Honghao	6
(England) Tom Ford	6
(England) Elliot Slessor	4

Last 16; Best of 11 frames
(England) Mark Selby	6
(China) Lyu Haotian	1
(Wales) Mark Williams	6
(Northern Ireland) Mark Allen	5
(England) Jack Lisowski	6
(England) Gary Wilson	2
(England) Kyren Wilson	6
(China) Ding Junhui	5
(China) Zhou Yuelong	1
(Australia) Neil Robertson	6
(England) Stuart Bingham	6
(Scotland) Graeme Dott	2
(England) Barry Hawkins	6
(China) Cao Yupeng	5
(China) Luo Honghao	2
(England) Tom Ford	6

Quarter-finals; Best of 11 frames
(England) Mark Selby	6
(Wales) Mark Williams	2
(England) Jack Lisowski	5
(England) Kyren Wilson	6
(Australia) Neil Robertson	6
(England) Stuart Bingham	0
(England) Barry Hawkins	6
(England) Tom Ford	5

Semi-finals; Best of 19 frames
(England) Mark Selby	10
(England) Kyren Wilson	8
(Australia) Neil Robertson	6
(England) Barry Hawkins	10

Final; Best of 21 frames
(England) Mark Selby	11
(England) Barry Hawkins	3

== Final ==
Final: Best of 21 frames. Referee: Peggy Li. Olympic Sports Center Gymnasium, Beijing, China, 8 April 2018.
Mark Selby; England	11–3	Barry Hawkins; England
Afternoon: 0–80, 78–31, 66–1, 63–17, 69–58, 65–48, 0–83, 114–4, 86–13, 72–6; Evеning: 112–17 (112), 83–43, 47–59, 132–0 (132)
132	Highest break	75
2	Century breaks	0

== Qualifying ==
The Round 2 qualifying matches – except for the held over ones – were played between 27 and 30 January 2018 at the Barnsley Metrodome in Barnsley, England. Qualifying Round 1 and the held over matches of Round 2 were played in Beijing on 2 April 2018.

All qualifying matches were best of 11 frames.

=== Round 1 ===
(China) Zhang Yong	4–6 (Note: Match held over and played in China.)	(China) Chang Bingyu
(China) Chen Feilong	6–2	(China) Fan Zhengyi

(Egypt) Basem Eltahhan	1–6	(China) Luo Honghao

=== Round 2 ===
(England) Mark Selby	6–4	(China) Wang Yuchen
(Scotland) Scott Donaldson	6–3	(China) Zhang Anda
(England) Ben Woollaston	6–1	(England) Rod Lawler
(England) Robert Milkins	4–6	(Wales) Lee Walker
(Wales) Ryan Day	3–6	(China) Lyu Haotian
(England) Rory McLeod	0–6	(England) Liam Highfield
(Scotland) Stephen Maguire	6–3	(Thailand) James Wattana
(Republic of Ireland) Fergal O'Brien	6–3	(England) Hammad Miah
(England) Mark Davis	6–2	(Switzerland) Alexander Ursenbacher
(England) Michael Holt	6–2	(Thailand) Sunny Akani
(Thailand) Thepchaiya Un-Nooh	6–4	(England) Ian Burns
(Wales) Mark Williams	6–1	(Wales) Ian Preece
(Norway) Kurt Maflin	6–5	(England) Ashley Hugill
(China) Yan Bingtao	6–2	(England) John Astley
(Thailand) Noppon Saengkham	6–4	(Republic of Ireland) Ken Doherty
(Northern Ireland) Mark Allen	6–4	(England) Allan Taylor
(Scotland) John Higgins	6–3	(England) Adam Duffy
(England) Alfie Burden	2–6	(England) Martin O'Donnell
(England) Anthony Hamilton	6–5	(Wales) David John
(England) Jack Lisowski	6–4	(Northern Ireland) Gerard Greene
(England) Ali Carter	6–4	(China) Chen Zifan
(England) Gary Wilson	6–2	(China) Niu Zhuang
(England) Joe Perry	6–1	(Northern Ireland) Joe Swail
(England) Matthew Selt	2–6	(Scotland) Chris Totten
(England) Peter Ebdon	6–2	(China) Chang Bingyu
(England) Mark King	6–2	(Republic of Ireland) Leo Fernandez
(England) Andrew Higginson	6–5	(China) Chen Feilong
(England) Kyren Wilson	6–0	(China) Li Yuan
(England) Jimmy Robertson	6–2	(England) Christopher Keogan
(China) Xiao Guodong	6–2	(Malta) Alex Borg
(China) Tian Pengfei	4–6	(England) Craig Steadman
(China) Ding Junhui	6–2	(Cyprus) Michael Georgiou

(England) Judd Trump	5–6	(Wales) Jak Jones
(England) Oliver Lines	3–6	(England) Nigel Bond
(China) Zhou Yuelong	6–2	(England) Sean O'Sullivan
(China) Li Hang	4–6	(China) Chen Zhe
(Australia) Neil Robertson	6–4	(Finland) Robin Hull
(England) Robbie Williams	6–3	(England) Sanderson Lam
(England) Martin Gould	6–2	(China) Fang Xiongman
(Wales) Jamie Jones	3–6	(England) Sam Craigie
(Iran) Hossein Vafaei	w/d–w/o	(Pakistan) Hamza Akbar
(England) Ricky Walden	6–2	(India) Aditya Mehta
(Wales) Matthew Stevens	6–1	(Scotland) Eden Sharav
(England) Stuart Bingham	6–2	(England) Jimmy White
(England) Mark Joyce	6–4	(England) Peter Lines
(Scotland) Graeme Dott	6–2	(China) Mei Xiwen
(England) Chris Wakelin	6–1	(Germany) Lukas Kleckers
(England) Shaun Murphy	6–3	(England) David Grace
(England) Barry Hawkins	6–4	(Republic of Ireland) Josh Boileau
(England) Sam Baird	6–5	(Iran) Soheil Vahedi
(Wales) Michael White	6–5	(China) Xu Si
(Wales) Dominic Dale	4–6	(England) Paul Davison
(Belgium) Luca Brecel	6–4	(China) Zhao Xintong
(China) Cao Yupeng	6–3	(Australia) Kurt Dunham
(England) David Gilbert	6–3	(England) Billy Joe Castle
(England) Mike Dunn	6–4	(England) Mitchell Mann
(China) Yu Delu	5–6	(Wales) Duane Jones
(China) Liang Wenbo	6–1	(Scotland) Rhys Clark
(England) Stuart Carrington	2–6	(China) Luo Honghao
(Scotland) Anthony McGill	6–5	(Malaysia) Thor Chuan Leong
(England) Tom Ford	6–3	(England) Jamie Curtis-Barrett
(Scotland) Alan McManus	5–6	(China) Yuan Sijun
(Wales) Daniel Wells	4–6	(England) Elliot Slessor
(England) Ronnie O'Sullivan	6–2	(Scotland) Ross Muir

== Century breaks ==
=== Main stage centuries ===
Total: 72

- 147, 105 – Stuart Bingham
- 147 – Ronnie O'Sullivan
- 143, 141, 136, 135, 135, 132, 119, 118, 112, 108 – Mark Selby
- 143, 110, 110, 105, 103, 103 – Neil Robertson
- 139 – Ali Carter
- 138, 133 – Ding Junhui
- 138, 105, 102 – Mark Allen
- 135, 127, 110, 101 – Sam Craigie
- 135, 105, 100 – Luo Honghao
- 135, 100 – Cao Yupeng
- 133, 122 – Craig Steadman
- 132, 125, 124, 103, 101 – Barry Hawkins
- 131, 130, 129, 112 – Mark Williams
- 130, 111 – Xiao Guodong
- 130, 102 – Joe Perry
- 130 – Yan Bingtao
- 127 – Stephen Maguire
- 126 – Anthony McGill
- 122, 115, 107, 103 – Zhou Yuelong
- 119 – David Gilbert
- 114, 106 – Duane Jones
- 114, 101 – Jack Lisowski
- 114 – Michael White
- 112, 111, 107, 105, 104 – Kyren Wilson
- 103 – Graeme Dott
- 103 – Tom Ford
- 102 – Fergal O'Brien
- 100 – Mark King
- 100 – Lyu Haotian

=== Qualifying stage centuries ===
Total: 45

- 143, 112 – Thepchaiya Un-Nooh
- 139 – Nigel Bond
- 138 – Yan Bingtao
- 137 – Thor Chuan Leong
- 133 – David Grace
- 132 – Ian Burns
- 128 – Gary Wilson
- 127, 121 – Sanderson Lam
- 127 – Mark Allen
- 126 – Neil Robertson
- 124 – Soheil Vahedi
- 122 – Robin Hull
- 122 – Zhang Yong
- 121 – Cao Yupeng
- 121 – John Higgins
- 119 – Martin Gould
- 119 – Barry Hawkins
- 118, 107 – Luo Honghao
- 118 – Lyu Haotian
- 117 – Judd Trump
- 116 – Zhou Yuelong
- 115 – Stephen Maguire
- 112 – Noppon Saengkham
- 111 – Mark Davis
- 110 – Ronnie O'Sullivan
- 109, 101, 100 – Mark Williams
- 109 – Luca Brecel
- 108 – Xiao Guodong
- 106 – Zhao Xintong
- 105, 105 – Elliot Slessor
- 105, 101 – Liang Wenbo
- 104 – Stuart Bingham
- 104 – Peter Ebdon
- 104 – Tian Pengfei
- 103 – Ben Woollaston
- 101 – Anthony Hamilton
- 101 – Kyren Wilson
- 100 – Li Hang
