= 2020 English Open (snooker) =

Snooker tournament

2020 Matchroom.live English Open
Tournament information
- Dates: 12–18 October 2020
- Venue: Marshall Arena
- City: Milton Keynes
- Country: England
- Organisation: World Snooker Tour
- Format: Ranking event
- Total prize fund: £405,000
- Winner's share: £70,000
- Highest break: Neil Robertson (AUS) (140)

Final
- Champion: Judd Trump (ENG)
- Runner-up: Neil Robertson (AUS)
- Score: 9–8

The 2020 English Open (officially the 2020 Matchroom.live English Open) was a professional snooker tournament that took place from 12 to 18 October 2020 at the Marshall Arena in Milton Keynes, England. It was the second completed ranking event of the 2020–21 season, and the fifth edition of the English Open, first held in 2016.

The event featured 123 professionals and 5 amateurs. On the first day of the event, two players withdrew from the event due to COVID-19 – Stuart Carrington tested positive, while Sam Craigie came into contact with Carrington. Snooker referee Andrew Barklam also tested positive. On the second day, two more players had to withdraw – Peter Lines, who tested positive, and his son, Oliver Lines, who came into contact with him.

The defending champion was Mark Selby, who defeated David Gilbert 9–1 in the 2019 final. Selby lost 5–6 to Neil Robertson in the semi-finals.

In the final Robertson met Judd Trump, who beat him 9–8, after being 4–7 down. Trump won his 18th ranking title, equaling Neil Robertson and Mark Selby, and became the first player to win three Home Nations titles.

== Prize fund ==
The event's total prize fund was a total of £405,000, with the winner receiving £70,000. The breakdown of prize money for this year is shown below:

- Winner: £70,000
- Runner-up: £30,000
- Semi-final: £20,000
- Quarter-final: £10,000
- Last 16: £7,500
- Last 32: £4,000
- Last 64: £3,000
- Highest break: £5,000
- Total: £405,000

== Main draw ==
=== Top half ===
==== Section 1 ====
Last 128; Best of 7 frames
Mark Selby (ENG) (1)	4
Fan Zhengyi (CHN)	0
Chang Bingyu (CHN)	4
Aaron Hill (IRL)	2
Martin O'Donnell (ENG) (32)	4
Ashley Carty (ENG)	1
Jackson Page (WAL)	1
Liang Wenbo (CHN)	4
Joe Perry (ENG) (16)	4
Riley Parsons (ENG)	1
Lukas Kleckers (GER)	0
Hossein Vafaei (IRN)	4
Ali Carter (ENG) (17)	1
Jamie Clarke (WAL)	4
Mitchell Mann (ENG)	1
Liam Highfield (ENG)	4

Last 64; Best of 7 frames
(England) Mark Selby (1)	4
(China) Chang Bingyu	3
(England) Martin O'Donnell (32)	1
(China) Liang Wenbo	4
(England) Joe Perry (16)	3
(Iran) Hossein Vafaei	4
(Wales) Jamie Clarke	4
(England) Liam Highfield	1

Last 32; Best of 7 frames
(England) Mark Selby (1)	4
(China) Liang Wenbo	3
(Iran) Hossein Vafaei	4
(Wales) Jamie Clarke	2

Last 16; Best of 7 frames
(England) Mark Selby (1)	4
(Iran) Hossein Vafaei	3

==== Section 2 ====
Last 128; Best of 7 frames
David Grace (ENG)	4
Paul Davison (ENG)	0
Scott Donaldson (SCO) (24)	1
Andy Hicks (ENG)	4
Barry Pinches (ENG)	0
Andrew Higginson (ENG)	4
Stephen Maguire (SCO) (9)	1
Sunny Akani (THA)	4
Rod Lawler (ENG)	0
Farakh Ajaib (ENG)	4
Zhou Yuelong (CHN) (25)	4
Chris Wakelin (ENG)	2
David Lilley (ENG)	4
Eden Sharav (ISR)	1
Shaun Murphy (ENG) (8)	4
Robert Milkins (ENG)	3

Last 64; Best of 7 frames
(England) David Grace	4
(England) Andy Hicks	3
(England) Andrew Higginson	4
(Thailand) Sunny Akani	3
(England) Farakh Ajaib	3
(China) Zhou Yuelong (25)	4
(England) David Lilley	4
(England) Shaun Murphy (8)	3

Last 32; Best of 7 frames
(England) David Grace	3
(England) Andrew Higginson	4
(China) Zhou Yuelong (25)	4
(England) David Lilley	2

Last 16; Best of 7 frames
(England) Andrew Higginson	0
(China) Zhou Yuelong (25)	4

==== Section 3 ====
Last 128; Best of 7 frames
Mark Allen (NIR) (5)	4
Mark King (ENG)	2
Gerard Greene (NIR)	1
Robbie Williams (ENG)	4
Kurt Maflin (NOR) (28)	4
Peter Devlin (ENG)	3
Jordan Brown (NIR)	4
Lee Walker (WAL)	2
Yan Bingtao (CHN) (12)	4
Alan McManus (SCO)	2
Martin Gould (ENG)	1
Steven Hallworth (ENG)	4
Anthony McGill (SCO) (21)	w/o
Sam Craigie (ENG)	w/d
Noppon Saengkham (THA)	1
Oliver Lines (ENG)	4

Last 64; Best of 7 frames
(Northern Ireland) Mark Allen (5)	0
(England) Robbie Williams	4
(Norway) Kurt Maflin (28)	4
(Northern Ireland) Jordan Brown	0
(China) Yan Bingtao (12)	3
(England) Steven Hallworth	4
(Scotland) Anthony McGill (21)	w/o
(England) Oliver Lines	w/d

Last 32; Best of 7 frames
(England) Robbie Williams	4
(Norway) Kurt Maflin (28)	2
(England) Steven Hallworth	0
(Scotland) Anthony McGill (21)	4

Last 16; Best of 7 frames
(England) Robbie Williams	4
(Scotland) Anthony McGill (21)	1

==== Section 4 ====
Last 128; Best of 7 frames
Lei Peifan (CHN)	4
Brandon Sargeant (ENG)	3
Barry Hawkins (ENG) (20)	4
Igor Figueiredo (BRA)	0
Soheil Vahedi (IRN)	3
Joe O'Connor (ENG)	4
David Gilbert (ENG) (13)	2
Rory McLeod (JAM)	4
Daniel Wells (WAL)	1
Mark Davis (ENG)	4
Zhao Xintong (CHN) (29)	4
Pang Junxu (CHN)	3
Tian Pengfei (CHN)	3
Mark Joyce (ENG)	4
Neil Robertson (AUS) (4)	4
Lyu Haotian (CHN)	0

Last 64; Best of 7 frames
(China) Lei Peifan	0
(England) Barry Hawkins (20)	4
(England) Joe O'Connor	4
(Jamaica) Rory McLeod	3
(England) Mark Davis	4
(China) Zhao Xintong (29)	3
(England) Mark Joyce	2
(Australia) Neil Robertson (4)	4

Last 32; Best of 7 frames
(England) Barry Hawkins (20)	4
(England) Joe O'Connor	2
(England) Mark Davis	1
(Australia) Neil Robertson (4)	4

Last 16; Best of 7 frames
(England) Barry Hawkins (20)	2
(Australia) Neil Robertson (4)	4

=== Bottom half ===
==== Section 5 ====
Last 128; Best of 7 frames
Judd Trump (ENG) (3)	4
Louis Heathcote (ENG)	3
Amine Amiri (MAR)	1
Yuan Sijun (CHN)	4
Michael Holt (ENG) (30)	4
Jimmy White (ENG)	1
Zak Surety (ENG)	1
Lu Ning (CHN)	4
Mark Williams (WAL) (14)	w/d
Allan Taylor (ENG)	w/o
Simon Lichtenberg (GER)	4
Anthony Hamilton (ENG)	3
Gary Wilson (ENG) (19)	4
Iulian Boiko (UKR)	1
Ricky Walden (ENG)	4
Billy Castle (ENG)	0

Last 64; Best of 7 frames
(England) Judd Trump (3)	4
(China) Yuan Sijun	3
(England) Michael Holt (30)	4
(China) Lu Ning	0
(England) Allan Taylor	4
(Germany) Simon Lichtenberg	3
(England) Gary Wilson (19)	4
(England) Ricky Walden	2

Last 32; Best of 7 frames
(England) Judd Trump (3)	4
(England) Michael Holt (30)	3
(England) Allan Taylor	2
(England) Gary Wilson (19)	4

Last 16; Best of 7 frames
(England) Judd Trump (3)	4
(England) Gary Wilson (19)	1

==== Section 6 ====
Last 128; Best of 7 frames
Nigel Bond (ENG)	4
Ashley Hugill (ENG)	3
Graeme Dott (SCO) (22)	2
Alexander Ursenbacher (SUI)	4
Ben Woollaston (ENG)	4
Alex Borg (MLT)	2
Stuart Bingham (ENG) (11)	4
Fergal O'Brien (IRL)	2
Xu Si (CHN)	4
Ken Doherty (IRL)	1
Matthew Selt (ENG) (27)	4
Jamie Wilson (ENG)	0
Gao Yang (CHN)	4
Kacper Filipiak (POL)	2
Kyren Wilson (ENG) (6)	4
Dominic Dale (WAL)	2

Last 64; Best of 7 frames
(England) Nigel Bond	0
(Switzerland) Alexander Ursenbacher	4
(England) Ben Woollaston	4
(England) Stuart Bingham (11)	2
(China) Xu Si	4
(England) Matthew Selt (27)	3
(China) Gao Yang	1
(England) Kyren Wilson (6)	4

Last 32; Best of 7 frames
(Switzerland) Alexander Ursenbacher	1
(England) Ben Woollaston	4
(China) Xu Si	1
(England) Kyren Wilson (6)	4

Last 16; Best of 7 frames
(England) Ben Woollaston	0
(England) Kyren Wilson (6)	4

==== Section 7 ====
Last 128; Best of 7 frames
John Higgins (SCO) (7)	4
James Cahill (ENG)	2
Fraser Patrick (SCO)	3
Connor Benzey (ENG)	4
Jimmy Robertson (ENG) (26)	4
Chen Zifan (CHN)	1
Peter Lines (ENG)	w/d
Luo Honghao (CHN)	w/o
Ding Junhui (CHN) (10)	4
Si Jiahui (CHN)	3
Ian Burns (ENG)	0
Luca Brecel (BEL)	4
Tom Ford (ENG) (23)	4
Xiao Guodong (CHN)	3
Jamie Jones (WAL)	4
Duane Jones (WAL)	2

Last 64; Best of 7 frames
(Scotland) John Higgins (7)	4
(England) Connor Benzey	0
(England) Jimmy Robertson (26)	4
(China) Luo Honghao	1
(China) Ding Junhui (10)	4
(Belgium) Luca Brecel	1
(England) Tom Ford (23)	4
(Wales) Jamie Jones	2

Last 32; Best of 7 frames
(Scotland) John Higgins (7)	4
(England) Jimmy Robertson (26)	1
(China) Ding Junhui (10)	4
(England) Tom Ford (23)	2

Last 16; Best of 7 frames
(Scotland) John Higgins (7)	4
(China) Ding Junhui (10)	1

==== Section 8 ====
Last 128; Best of 7 frames
Sean Maddocks (ENG)	2
Ben Hancorn (ENG)	4
Thepchaiya Un-Nooh (THA) (18)	w/o
Stuart Carrington (ENG)	w/d
Jak Jones (WAL)	4
Elliot Slessor (ENG)	1
Jack Lisowski (ENG) (15)	4
Li Hang (CHN)	2
Michael White (WAL)	3
Zhao Jianbo (CHN)	4
Matthew Stevens (WAL) (31)	4
Jamie O'Neill (ENG)	2
Ryan Day (WAL)	4
Mark Lloyd (ENG)	0
Ronnie O'Sullivan (ENG) (2)	4
Brian Ochoiski (FRA)	2

Last 64; Best of 7 frames
(England) Ben Hancorn	4
(Thailand) Thepchaiya Un-Nooh (18)	2
(Wales) Jak Jones	4
(England) Jack Lisowski (15)	3
(China) Zhao Jianbo	2
(Wales) Matthew Stevens (31)	4
(Wales) Ryan Day	1
(England) Ronnie O'Sullivan (2)	4

Last 32; Best of 7 frames
(England) Ben Hancorn	2
(Wales) Jak Jones	4
(Wales) Matthew Stevens (31)	4
(England) Ronnie O'Sullivan (2)	1

Last 16; Best of 7 frames
(Wales) Jak Jones	4
(Wales) Matthew Stevens (31)	3

=== Finals ===
Quarter-finals; Best of 9 frames
(England) Mark Selby (1)	5
(China) Zhou Yuelong (25)	2
(England) Robbie Williams	2
(Australia) Neil Robertson (4)	5
(England) Judd Trump (3)	5
(England) Kyren Wilson (6)	1
(Scotland) John Higgins (7)	5
(Wales) Jak Jones	1

Semi-finals; Best of 11 frames
(England) Mark Selby (1)	5
(Australia) Neil Robertson (4)	6
(England) Judd Trump (3)	6
(Scotland) John Higgins (7)	4

Final; Best of 17 frames
(Australia) Neil Robertson (4)	8
(England) Judd Trump (3)	9

=== Final ===
Final: Best of 17 frames. Referee: Desislava Bozhilova. Marshall Arena, Milton Keynes, England, 18 October 2020.
Neil Robertson (4); Australia	8–9	Judd Trump (3); England
Afternoon: 10–68, 80–0, 0–76, 26–72, 75–1, 128–5 (128), 75–11, 15–61; Evening: 66–4, 75–52, 115–9 (114), 0–76, 5–64, 65–70, 13–74, 125–0 (125), 0–114 (114)
128	Highest break	114
3	Century breaks	1

== Century breaks ==
A total of 66 century breaks were made by 35 players during the event.

- 140, 134, 133, 129, 128, 125, 119, 117, 114, 114, 102, 100 – Neil Robertson
- 139 – Joe Perry
- 137, 112 – Ding Junhui
- 136, 136, 102 – Stuart Bingham
- 136 – Hossein Vafaei
- 135 – Jamie Clarke
- 133, 124 – Gary Wilson
- 133, 122, 107 – John Higgins
- 128 – Liam Highfield
- 126 – Steven Hallworth
- 125, 117 – Mark Selby
- 124, 115, 103 – Zhou Yuelong
- 124 – Anthony McGill
- 124 – Eden Sharav
- 122, 113 – Jack Lisowski
- 122 – Shaun Murphy
- 119, 116 – David Lilley
- 116 – Mark Joyce
- 116 – Matthew Stevens
- 114, 112, 102, 101 – Judd Trump
- 113 – Luca Brecel
- 113 – Ronnie O'Sullivan
- 111 – Ben Hancorn
- 110, 102 – Ricky Walden
- 110 – Michael Holt
- 110 – Oliver Lines
- 108 – Zhao Xintong
- 105, 100 – Jak Jones
- 105 – Ryan Day
- 105 – Brian Ochoiski
- 105 – Ben Woollaston
- 103, 102 – Jamie Jones
- 103 – Robert Milkins
- 102 – Duane Jones
- 100, 100 – Kurt Maflin
- 100 – Farakh Ajaib
- 100 – Kyren Wilson
