= Sean Maddocks =

English professional snooker player

Personal information
- Born: 10 April 2002 (age 24) Liverpool, England

Sport
- Country: England
- Sport: Snooker
- Professional: 2020–2022
- Highest ranking: 91 (July 2021)

Sean Maddocks (born 10 April 2002) is an English former professional snooker player. As a 15 year old, he became the youngest snooker player to score a 147 break in competition, beating the previous record held by Ronnie O'Sullivan.

== Career ==
In January 2020, Maddocks finished as runner-up in the WSF Junior Open, as a result, he was awarded a two-year card on the World Snooker Tour for the 2020–21 and 2021–22.

== Performance and rankings timeline ==
Tournament	2018/ 19	2019/ 20	2020/ 21	2021/ 22
Ranking (Note: It shows the ranking at the beginning of the season.)	(Note: He was an amateur.)		(Note: New players on the Main Tour don't have a ranking.)	91
Ranking tournaments
Championship League	Non-Ranking		RR	RR
British Open	Tournament Not Held			1R
Northern Ireland Open	A	A	1R	LQ
English Open	A	A	1R	LQ
UK Championship	A	A	1R	1R
Scottish Open	A	A	1R	LQ
World Grand Prix	DNQ	DNQ	DNQ	DNQ
Shoot-Out	A	1R	1R	1R
German Masters	A	A	LQ	LQ
Players Championship	DNQ	DNQ	DNQ	DNQ
European Masters	A	A	1R	1R
Welsh Open	A	A	1R	LQ
Turkish Masters	Tournament Not Held			LQ
Gibraltar Open	LQ	A	1R	1R
Tour Championship	DNQ	DNQ	DNQ	DNQ
World Championship	A	LQ	LQ	LQ
Former ranking tournaments
Paul Hunter Classic	LQ	NR	Not Held	
WST Pro Series	Not Held		RR	NH

Performance Table Legend
LQ	lost in the qualifying draw	#R	lost in the early rounds of the tournament (WR = Wildcard round, RR = Round robin)	QF	lost in the quarter-finals
SF	lost in the semi-finals	F	lost in the final	W	won the tournament
DNQ	did not qualify for the tournament	A	did not participate in the tournament	WD	withdrew from the tournament

NH / Not Held	means an event was not held.
NR / Non-Ranking Event	means an event is/was no longer a ranking event.
R / Ranking Event	means an event is/was a ranking event.
MR / Minor-Ranking Event	means an event is/was a minor-ranking event.

== Career finals ==
=== Amateur finals: 2 ===
Outcome	No.	Year	Championship	Opponent in the final	Score
Runner-up	1.	2020	WSF Junior Open	(China) Gao Yang	2–5
Runner-up	2.	2020	EBSA European Under-18 Snooker Championships	(Republic of Ireland) Aaron Hill	1–4
