= 2020 Scottish Open (snooker) =

Snooker tournament

2020 Matchroom.live Scottish Open
Tournament information
- Dates: 7–13 December 2020
- Venue: Marshall Arena
- City: Milton Keynes
- Country: England
- Organisation: World Snooker Tour
- Format: Ranking event
- Total prize fund: £405,000
- Winner's share: £70,000
- Highest break: Zhou Yuelong (CHN) (147)

Final
- Champion: Mark Selby (ENG)
- Runner-up: Ronnie O'Sullivan (ENG)
- Score: 9–3

The 2020 Scottish Open (officially the 2020 Matchroom.live Scottish Open) was a professional ranking snooker tournament, that took place on 7–13 December 2020 at the Marshall Arena in Milton Keynes, England. It was the sixth ranking event of the 2020–21 season and the third event of the Home Nations Series.

Liam Highfield's 140 break in his last 32 match against Barry Hawkins was the fifth 16-red clearance in a professional tournament.

Mark Selby was the defending champion after a 9–6 defeat of Jack Lisowski in the 2019 final. He successfully defended his title, winning against Ronnie O'Sullivan 9–3. This was Selby's 19th career ranking title, and he became the second player, after Judd Trump, to win three Home Nations Series titles.

Zhou Yuelong made his second career maximum break in the third frame of his first-round match with Peter Lines.

== Prize fund ==
The breakdown of prize money for this year is shown below:

- Winner: £70,000
- Runner-up: £30,000
- Semi-final: £20,000
- Quarter-final: £10,000
- Last 16: £7,500
- Last 32: £4,000
- Last 64: £3,000
- Highest break: £5,000
- Total: £405,000

== Tournament draw ==
=== Top half ===
==== Section 1 ====
Last 128; Best of 7 frames
Mark Selby (ENG) (1)	4
Yuan Sijun (CHN)	1
Gary Thomson (SCO)	2
Nigel Bond (ENG)	4
Ben Woollaston (ENG) (32)	4
Amine Amiri (MAR)	1
Mark Joyce (ENG)	4
Xu Si (CHN)	2
Jack Lisowski (ENG) (16)	4
Oliver Lines (ENG)	2
Sunny Akani (THA)	4
Ian Burns (ENG)	2
Gary Wilson (ENG) (17)	0
Lyu Haotian (CHN)	4
Alan McManus (SCO)	4
Xiao Guodong (CHN)	2

Last 64; Best of 7 frames
(England) Mark Selby (1)	4
(England) Nigel Bond	2
(England) Ben Woollaston (32)	2
(England) Mark Joyce	4
(England) Jack Lisowski (16)	w/d
(Thailand) Sunny Akani	w/o
(China) Lyu Haotian	4
(Scotland) Alan McManus	2

Last 32; Best of 7 frames
(England) Mark Selby (1)	4
(England) Mark Joyce	2
(Thailand) Sunny Akani	3
(China) Lyu Haotian	4

Last 16; Best of 7 frames
(England) Mark Selby (1)	4
(China) Lyu Haotian	1

==== Section 2 ====
Last 128; Best of 7 frames
Pang Junxu (CHN)	0
Ricky Walden (ENG)	4
Tom Ford (ENG) (24)	4
Rory McLeod (JAM)	0
Gao Yang (CHN)	4
Duane Jones (WAL)	2
Stephen Maguire (SCO) (9)	1
Zak Surety (ENG)	4
Barry Pinches (ENG)	3
Jordan Brown (NIR)	4
Zhou Yuelong (CHN) (25)	4
Peter Lines (ENG)	1
Iulian Boiko (UKR)	1
Joe O'Connor (ENG)	4
Mark Allen (NIR) (8)	4
Jimmy White (ENG)	1

Last 64; Best of 7 frames
(England) Ricky Walden	4
(England) Tom Ford (24)	3
(China) Gao Yang	1
(England) Zak Surety	4
(Northern Ireland) Jordan Brown	2
(China) Zhou Yuelong (25)	4
(England) Joe O'Connor	2
(Northern Ireland) Mark Allen (8)	4

Last 32; Best of 7 frames
(England) Ricky Walden	4
(England) Zak Surety	0
(China) Zhou Yuelong (25)	3
(Northern Ireland) Mark Allen (8)	4

Last 16; Best of 7 frames
(England) Ricky Walden	4
(Northern Ireland) Mark Allen (8)	3

==== Section 3 ====
Last 128; Best of 7 frames
Kyren Wilson (ENG) (5)	4
Simon Lichtenberg (GER)	1
Steven Hallworth (ENG)	4
Brian Ochoiski (FRA)	1
Michael Holt (ENG) (28)	4
Gerard Greene (NIR)	1
Louis Heathcote (ENG)	4
Si Jiahui (CHN)	2
Yan Bingtao (CHN) (12)	1
Jak Jones (WAL)	4
Liam Highfield (ENG)	4
Fan Zhengyi (CHN)	0
Barry Hawkins (ENG) (21)	4
Stuart Carrington (ENG)	0
James Cahill (ENG)	2
Jamie Clarke (WAL)	4

Last 64; Best of 7 frames
(England) Kyren Wilson (5)	4
(England) Steven Hallworth	1
(England) Michael Holt (28)	4
(England) Louis Heathcote	2
(Wales) Jak Jones	0
(England) Liam Highfield	4
(England) Barry Hawkins (21)	4
(Wales) Jamie Clarke	2

Last 32; Best of 7 frames
(England) Kyren Wilson (5)	4
(England) Michael Holt (28)	2
(England) Liam Highfield	3
(England) Barry Hawkins (21)	4

Last 16; Best of 7 frames
(England) Kyren Wilson (5)	4
(England) Barry Hawkins (21)	3

==== Section 4 ====
Last 128; Best of 7 frames
Sean Maddocks (ENG)	1
Brandon Sargeant (ENG)	4
Anthony McGill (SCO) (20)	2
Sam Craigie (ENG)	4
Jamie Jones (WAL)	4
Daniel Wells (WAL)	2
David Gilbert (ENG) (13)	3
Matthew Stevens (WAL)	4
Zhao Jianbo (CHN)	4
Kacper Filipiak (POL)	0
Zhao Xintong (CHN) (29)	4
Rod Lawler (ENG)	0
Eden Sharav (ISR)	4
Anthony Hamilton (ENG)	3
Neil Robertson (AUS) (4)	w/d
Lei Peifan (CHN)	w/o

Last 64; Best of 7 frames
(England) Brandon Sargeant	2
(England) Sam Craigie	4
(Wales) Jamie Jones	4
(Wales) Matthew Stevens	3
(China) Zhao Jianbo	4
(China) Zhao Xintong (29)	2
(Israel) Eden Sharav	4
(China) Lei Peifan	2

Last 32; Best of 7 frames
(England) Sam Craigie	3
(Wales) Jamie Jones	4
(China) Zhao Jianbo	1
(Israel) Eden Sharav	4

Last 16; Best of 7 frames
(Wales) Jamie Jones	4
(Israel) Eden Sharav	3

=== Bottom half ===
==== Section 5 ====
Last 128; Best of 7 frames
Judd Trump (ENG) (3)	4
Alexander Ursenbacher (SUI)	1
Chen Zifan (CHN)	0
Mark King (ENG)	4
Liang Wenbo (CHN) (30)	4
David Lilley (ENG)	1
Andrew Higginson (ENG)	3
Luca Brecel (BEL)	4
Mark Williams (WAL) (14)	4
Lukas Kleckers (GER)	3
Dominic Dale (WAL)	4
Igor Figueiredo (BRA)	3
Joe Perry (ENG) (19)	3
Jackson Page (WAL)	4
Alex Borg (MLT)	w/d
Ashley Carty (ENG)	w/o

Last 64; Best of 7 frames
(England) Judd Trump (3)	4
(England) Mark King	2
(China) Liang Wenbo (30)	4
(Belgium) Luca Brecel	1
(Wales) Mark Williams (14)	4
(Wales) Dominic Dale	2
(Wales) Jackson Page	4
(England) Ashley Carty	3

Last 32; Best of 7 frames
(England) Judd Trump (3)	4
(China) Liang Wenbo (30)	2
(Wales) Mark Williams (14)	4
(Wales) Jackson Page	1

Last 16; Best of 7 frames
(England) Judd Trump (3)	4
(Wales) Mark Williams (14)	1

==== Section 6 ====
Last 128; Best of 7 frames
Ashley Hugill (ENG)	4
Farakh Ajaib (ENG)	0
Graeme Dott (SCO) (22)	0
Robert Milkins (ENG)	4
Lee Walker (WAL)	4
Fergal O'Brien (IRL)	3
Stuart Bingham (ENG) (11)	4
Ben Hancorn (ENG)	2
Luo Honghao (CHN)	3
Li Hang (CHN)	4
Matthew Selt (ENG) (27)	4
Elliot Slessor (ENG)	0
Jimmy Robertson (ENG)	2
Noppon Saengkham (THA)	4
John Higgins (SCO) (6)	4
Soheil Vahedi (IRN)	3

Last 64; Best of 7 frames
(England) Ashley Hugill	1
(England) Robert Milkins	4
(Wales) Lee Walker	0
(England) Stuart Bingham (11)	4
(China) Li Hang	4
(England) Matthew Selt (27)	3
(Thailand) Noppon Saengkham	4
(Scotland) John Higgins (6)	2

Last 32; Best of 7 frames
(England) Robert Milkins	3
(England) Stuart Bingham (11)	4
(China) Li Hang	4
(Thailand) Noppon Saengkham	1

Last 16; Best of 7 frames
(England) Stuart Bingham (11)	3
(China) Li Hang	4

==== Section 7 ====
Last 128; Best of 7 frames
Shaun Murphy (ENG) (7)	4
David Grace (ENG)	1
Aaron Hill (IRL)	2
Peter Devlin (ENG)	4
Kurt Maflin (NOR) (26)	3
Jamie O'Neill (ENG)	4
Mitchell Mann (ENG)	2
Hossein Vafaei (IRN)	4
Ding Junhui (CHN) (10)	4
Mark Davis (ENG)	0
Andy Hicks (ENG)	4
Billy Castle (ENG)	2
Scott Donaldson (SCO) (23)	2
Michael White (WAL)	4
Jamie Wilson (ENG)	2
Martin O'Donnell (ENG)	4

Last 64; Best of 7 frames
(England) Shaun Murphy (7)	4
(England) Peter Devlin	2
(England) Jamie O'Neill	4
(Iran) Hossein Vafaei	1
(China) Ding Junhui (10)	4
(England) Andy Hicks	2
(Wales) Michael White	2
(England) Martin O'Donnell	4

Last 32; Best of 7 frames
(England) Shaun Murphy (7)	2
(England) Jamie O'Neill	4
(China) Ding Junhui (10)	4
(England) Martin O'Donnell	0

Last 16; Best of 7 frames
(England) Jamie O'Neill	3
(China) Ding Junhui (10)	4

==== Section 8 ====
Last 128; Best of 7 frames
Robbie Williams (ENG)	4
Paul Davison (ENG)	2
Ali Carter (ENG) (18)	4
Ryan Day (WAL)	2
Riley Parsons (ENG)	0
Lu Ning (CHN)	4
Thepchaiya Un-Nooh (THA) (15)	4
(Scotland) Michael Collumb	3
Chris Wakelin (ENG)	4
Fraser Patrick (SCO)	0
Martin Gould (ENG) (31)	1
Tian Pengfei (CHN)	4
Ken Doherty (IRL)	1
Chang Bingyu (CHN)	4
Ronnie O'Sullivan (ENG) (2)	4
Allan Taylor (ENG)	2

Last 64; Best of 7 frames
(England) Robbie Williams	4
(England) Ali Carter (18)	3
(China) Lu Ning	4
(Thailand) Thepchaiya Un-Nooh (15)	1
(England) Chris Wakelin	1
(China) Tian Pengfei	4
(China) Chang Bingyu	1
(England) Ronnie O'Sullivan (2)	4

Last 32; Best of 7 frames
(England) Robbie Williams	4
(China) Lu Ning	3
(China) Tian Pengfei	3
(England) Ronnie O'Sullivan (2)	4

Last 16; Best of 7 frames
(England) Robbie Williams	1
(England) Ronnie O'Sullivan (2)	4

=== Finals ===
Quarter-finals; Best of 9 frames
(England) Mark Selby (1)	5
(England) Ricky Walden	4
(England) Kyren Wilson (5)	1
(Wales) Jamie Jones	5
(England) Judd Trump (3)	4
(China) Li Hang	5
(China) Ding Junhui (10)	4
(England) Ronnie O'Sullivan (2)	5

Semi-finals; Best of 11 frames
(England) Mark Selby (1)	6
(Wales) Jamie Jones	1
(China) Li Hang	4
(England) Ronnie O'Sullivan (2)	6

Final; Best of 17 frames
(England) Mark Selby (1)	9
(England) Ronnie O'Sullivan (2)	3

=== Final ===
Final: Best of 17 frames. Referee: Leo Scullion; Marshall Arena, Milton Keynes, England, 13 December 2020.
Mark Selby (1); England	9–3	Ronnie O'Sullivan (2); England
Afternoon: 104–21, 5–72, 137–4 (102), 82–25, 62–76, 97–17, 119–0, 90–37; Evening: 129–0, 40–96, 83–48, 76–64
102	Highest break	72
1	Century breaks	0

== Century breaks ==
A total of 86 century breaks were made by 45 players during the tournament.

- 147 – Zhou Yuelong
- 140, 126 – Liam Highfield
- 138, 132, 103, 102 – Barry Hawkins
- 137, 101 – Shaun Murphy
- 135, 129, 128, 123, 121, 102, 101, 100 – Mark Selby
- 135, 129, 112, 110, 109, 105 – Mark Allen
- 135, 126, 114, 114, 103, 101 – Ding Junhui
- 134, 127, 123 – Ronnie O'Sullivan
- 134, 127, 113, 100 – Kyren Wilson
- 134 – Lu Ning
- 134 – Kurt Maflin
- 134 – Matthew Stevens
- 133, 129 – Liang Wenbo
- 131 – Ashley Hugill
- 129, 104 – Tian Pengfei
- 129 – Stuart Bingham
- 128 – Chris Wakelin
- 127 – Noppon Saengkham
- 126, 121, 113, 108, 101 – Michael Holt
- 126 – Zhao Xintong
- 124 – Jimmy Robertson
- 123 – Dominic Dale
- 123 – Zak Surety
- 122 – Yuan Sijun
- 121 – Steven Hallworth
- 120 – Andy Hicks
- 117, 113 – Ricky Walden
- 112 – Alan McManus
- 110 Michael Collumb
- 109 – Jak Jones
- 108, 106 – Mark Joyce
- 107 – Lyu Haotian
- 106 – Jackson Page
- 105, 100 – Jamie Jones
- 104, 104, 103 – Judd Trump
- 104, 100 – Mark Williams
- 104 – Luo Honghao
- 103, 100 – Robbie Williams
- 103 – Ali Carter
- 102 – Jamie Clarke
- 102 – Jack Lisowski
- 102 – Si Jiahui
- 102 – Thepchaiya Un-Nooh
- 101, 100 – Li Hang
- 100 – Igor Figueiredo
