= 2020 UK Championship =

Snooker tournament

2020 Betway UK Championship

Tournament information
- Dates: 23 November – 6 December 2020
- Venue: Marshall Arena
- City: Milton Keynes
- Country: England
- Organisation: World Snooker Tour
- Format: Ranking event
- Total prize fund: £1,009,000
- Winner's share: £200,000
- Highest break: Stuart Bingham (ENG); Kyren Wilson (ENG) (147)

Final
- Champion: Neil Robertson (AUS)
- Runner-up: Judd Trump (ENG)
- Score: 10–9

The 2020 UK Championship (officially the 2020 Betway UK Championship) was a professional snooker tournament, that took place from 23 November to 6 December 2020 at the Marshall Arena, in Milton Keynes, England. The event was the first Triple Crown and fifth ranking event of the 2020–21 snooker season. The tournament was played behind closed doors due to COVID-19 restrictions. The event was broadcast by the BBC and Eurosport and featured a prize fund of £1,009,000 with the winner receiving £200,000.

The defending champion was Ding Junhui, who defeated Stephen Maguire 10–6 in the 2019 final. However, Ding lost 5–6 to David Grace in the second round.

Both Kyren Wilson and Stuart Bingham made maximum breaks in the first round of the event. On 28 November, Trump became the fourth player to make 750 career centuries, during his last-64 match against Dominic Dale. Later in the tournament, on 4 December, Robertson also completed his 750th century break in his quarter-final defeat of Mark Selby.

Neil Robertson won the title beating Judd Trump 10–9 in the final. At 9–9 Trump missed a simple final pink when only needing the pink and black to win the title, Robertson then potted the pink to win his third UK Championship.

== Overview ==
The 2020 UK Championship took place between 23 November and 6 December 2020 at the Marshall Arena in Milton Keynes, England. It was the fifth ranking event of the 2020–21 snooker season, and the first of three Triple Crown events. There were 128 players from the World Snooker Tour taking part in the championship. All matches until the final were played over a maximum of 11 frames, with the final played as a best-of-19-frames match, held over two sessions. The first round of the competition started on 23 November, with players seeded according to their world rankings.

The defending champion was Ding Junhui, who defeated Stephen Maguire 10–6 in the 2019 final to win his third UK title. As defending champion, Ding was seeded first, with world champion Ronnie O'Sullivan seeded second.

=== Prize fund ===
The total prize fund for the event was £1,009,000 with the winner receiving £200,000. The breakdown of prize money is shown below:

- Winner: £200,000
- Runner-up: £80,000
- Semi-final: £40,000
- Quarter-final: £24,500
- Last 16: £17,000
- Last 32: £12,000
- Last 64: £6,500
- Highest break: £15,000
- Total: £1,009,000

== Tournament draw ==
The results of the event are shown below. The winners of each match are indicated in bold.

=== Top half ===
==== Section 1 ====
Last 128; Best of 11 frames
1	**Ding Junhui** (CHN)	**6**
A	Jamie Curtis-Barrett (ENG)	1
64	Ian Burns (ENG)	4
65	**David Grace** (ENG)	**6**
32	**Luca Brecel** (BEL)	**6**
97	Lei Peifan (CHN)	2
33	**Xiao Guodong** (CHN)	**6**
96	Brandon Sargeant (ENG)	1
16	**Jack Lisowski** (ENG)	**6**
113	Farakh Ajaib (ENG)	2
49	**Tian Pengfei** (CHN)	**6**
80	Jamie O'Neill (ENG)	0
17	Gary Wilson (ENG)	4
112	**Oliver Lines** (ENG)	**6**
48	Anthony Hamilton (ENG)	w/d
81	**Xu Si** (CHN)	**w/o**

Last 64; Best of 11 frames
1	(China) Ding Junhui	5
65	(England) **David Grace**	**6**
32	(Belgium) Luca Brecel	5
33	(China) **Xiao Guodong**	**6**
16	(England) **Jack Lisowski**	**6**
49	(China) Tian Pengfei	2
112	(England) Oliver Lines	1
81	(China) **Xu Si**	**6**

Last 32; Best of 11 frames
65	(England) David Grace	3
33	(China) **Xiao Guodong**	**6**
16	(England) **Jack Lisowski**	**6**
81	(China) Xu Si	2

Last 16; Best of 11 frames
33	(China) Xiao Guodong	4
16	(England) **Jack Lisowski**	**6**

==== Section 2 ====
Last 128; Best of 11 frames
41	Alan McManus (SCO)	4
88	**Jimmy White** (ENG)	**6**
24	**Zhou Yuelong** (CHN)	**6**
105	Peter Devlin (ENG)	1
56	Sam Craigie (ENG)	4
73	**Chang Bingyu** (CHN)	**6**
9	**Mark Allen** (NIR)	**6**
120	Jamie Wilson (ENG)	1
40	Ryan Day (WAL)	w/d
89	**Jak Jones** (WAL)	**w/o**
25	Scott Donaldson (SCO)	3
104	**Simon Lichtenberg** (GER)	**6**
57	Daniel Wells (WAL)	4
72	**Gerard Greene** (NIR)	**6**
8	**John Higgins** (SCO)	**6**
121	Fergal O'Brien (IRL)	1

Last 64; Best of 11 frames
88	(England) Jimmy White	1
24	(China) **Zhou Yuelong**	**6**
73	(China) **Chang Bingyu**	**6**
9	(Northern Ireland) Mark Allen	5
89	(Wales) **Jak Jones**	**6**
104	(Germany) Simon Lichtenberg	2
72	(Northern Ireland) Gerard Greene	3
8	(Scotland) **John Higgins**	**6**

Last 32; Best of 11 frames
24	(China) **Zhou Yuelong**	**6**
73	(China) Chang Bingyu	5
89	(Wales) Jak Jones	2
8	(Scotland) **John Higgins**	**6**

Last 16; Best of 11 frames
24	(China) **Zhou Yuelong**	**6**
8	(Scotland) John Higgins	2

==== Section 3 ====
Last 128; Best of 11 frames
5	**Mark Selby** (ENG)	**6**
A	Michael White (WAL)	4
60	**Liam Highfield** (ENG)	**6**
69	Jackson Page (WAL)	3
28	**Michael Holt** (ENG)	**6**
101	Gao Yang (CHN)	4
37	**Hossein Vafaei** (IRN)	**6**
92	Billy Castle (ENG)	3
12	**David Gilbert** (ENG)	**6**
117	Fan Zhengyi (CHN)	3
53	**Robert Milkins** (ENG)	**6**
76	Si Jiahui (CHN)	4
21	**Barry Hawkins** (ENG)	**6**
108	Riley Parsons (ENG)	1
44	Mark Davis (ENG)	4
85	**Robbie Williams** (ENG)	**6**

Last 64; Best of 11 frames
5	(England) **Mark Selby**	**6**
60	(England) Liam Highfield	1
28	(England) Michael Holt	4
37	(Iran) **Hossein Vafaei**	**6**
12	(England) David Gilbert	4
53	(England) **Robert Milkins**	**6**
21	(England) **Barry Hawkins**	**6**
85	(England) Robbie Williams	1

Last 32; Best of 11 frames
5	(England) **Mark Selby**	**6**
37	(Iran) Hossein Vafaei	2
53	(England) Robert Milkins	3
21	(England) **Barry Hawkins**	**6**

Last 16; Best of 11 frames
5	(England) **Mark Selby**	**6**
21	(England) Barry Hawkins	3

==== Section 4 ====
Last 128; Best of 11 frames
45	**Lyu Haotian** (CHN)	**6**
84	Soheil Vahedi (IRN)	4
20	**Anthony McGill** (SCO)	**6**
109	Steven Hallworth (ENG)	4
52	Yuan Sijun (CHN)	5
77	**Chen Zifan** (CHN)	**6**
13	**Yan Bingtao** (CHN)	**6**
116	Sean Maddocks (ENG)	4
36	**Li Hang** (CHN)	**6**
93	Fraser Patrick (SCO)	3
29	**Zhao Xintong** (CHN)	**6**
100	Rory McLeod (JAM)	3
61	**Chris Wakelin** (ENG)	**6**
68	Louis Heathcote (ENG)	0
4	**Neil Robertson** (AUS)	**6**
A	Brian Ochoiski (FRA)	0

Last 64; Best of 11 frames
45	(China) Lyu Haotian	5
20	(Scotland) **Anthony McGill**	**6**
77	(China) **Chen Zifan**	**6**
13	(China) Yan Bingtao	5
36	(China) **Li Hang**	**6**
29	(China) Zhao Xintong	3
61	(England) Chris Wakelin	1
4	(Australia) **Neil Robertson**	**6**

Last 32; Best of 11 frames
20	(Scotland) **Anthony McGill**	**6**
77	(China) Chen Zifan	1
36	(China) Li Hang	2
4	(Australia) **Neil Robertson**	**6**

Last 16; Best of 11 frames
20	(Scotland) Anthony McGill	4
4	(Australia) **Neil Robertson**	**6**

=== Bottom half ===
==== Section 5 ====
Last 128; Best of 11 frames
3	**Judd Trump** (ENG)	**6**
A	Paul Davison (ENG)	1
62	Luo Honghao (CHN)	3
67	**Dominic Dale** (WAL)	**6**
30	**Liang Wenbo** (CHN)	**6**
99	Allan Taylor (ENG)	3
35	Ben Woollaston (ENG)	5
94	**Andy Hicks** (ENG)	**6**
14	**Mark Williams** (WAL)	**6**
115	Ben Hancorn (ENG)	0
51	**Sunny Akani** (THA)	**6**
78	Kacper Filipiak (POL)	1
19	Ali Carter (ENG)	4
110	**Ashley Carty** (ENG)	**6**
46	**Ricky Walden** (ENG)	**6**
83	Rod Lawler (ENG)	0

Last 64; Best of 11 frames
3	(England) **Judd Trump**	**6**
67	(Wales) Dominic Dale	3
30	(China) **Liang Wenbo**	**6**
94	(England) Andy Hicks	3
14	(Wales) **Mark Williams**	**6**
51	(Thailand) Sunny Akani	2
110	(England) Ashley Carty	2
46	(England) **Ricky Walden**	**6**

Last 32; Best of 11 frames
3	(England) **Judd Trump**	**6**
30	(China) Liang Wenbo	1
14	(Wales) Mark Williams	5
46	(England) **Ricky Walden**	**6**

Last 16; Best of 11 frames
3	(England) **Judd Trump**	**6**
46	(England) Ricky Walden	3

==== Section 6 ====
Last 128; Best of 11 frames
43	**Mark King** (ENG)	**6**
86	David Lilley (ENG)	5
22	**Graeme Dott** (SCO)	**6**
107	Zhao Jianbo (CHN)	1
54	**Andrew Higginson** (ENG)	**6**
75	James Cahill (ENG)	5
11	**Stuart Bingham** (ENG)	**6**
118	Zak Surety (ENG)	2
38	Martin O'Donnell (ENG)	5
91	**Jamie Clarke** (WAL)	**6**
27	**Kurt Maflin** (NOR)	**6**
102	Aaron Hill (IRL)	3
59	**Mark Joyce** (ENG)	**6**
70	Eden Sharav (ISR)	1
6	**Kyren Wilson** (ENG)	**6**
123	Ashley Hugill (ENG)	4

Last 64; Best of 11 frames
43	(England) Mark King	4
22	(Scotland) **Graeme Dott**	**6**
54	(England) Andrew Higginson	1
11	(England) **Stuart Bingham**	**6**
91	(Wales) Jamie Clarke	5
27	(Norway) **Kurt Maflin**	**6**
59	(England) Mark Joyce	2
6	(England) **Kyren Wilson**	**6**

Last 32; Best of 11 frames
22	(Scotland) **Graeme Dott**	**6**
11	(England) Stuart Bingham	2
27	(Norway) Kurt Maflin	3
6	(England) **Kyren Wilson**	**6**

Last 16; Best of 11 frames
22	(Scotland) Graeme Dott	1
6	(England) **Kyren Wilson**	**6**

==== Section 7 ====
Last 128; Best of 11 frames
7	**Shaun Murphy** (ENG)	**6**
122	Lee Walker (WAL)	5
58	**Elliot Slessor** (ENG)	**6**
71	Mitchell Mann (ENG)	3
26	**Matthew Selt** (ENG)	**6**
103	Amine Amiri (MAR)	0
39	**Lu Ning** (CHN)	**6**
90	Ken Doherty (IRL)	4
10	**Stephen Maguire** (SCO)	**6**
119	Iulian Boiko (UKR)	1
55	**Stuart Carrington** (ENG)	**6**
74	Barry Pinches (ENG)	5
23	Tom Ford (ENG)	4
106	**Pang Junxu** (CHN)	**6**
42	**Noppon Saengkham** (THA)	**6**
87	Peter Lines (ENG)	3

Last 64; Best of 11 frames
7	(England) Shaun Murphy	1
58	(England) **Elliot Slessor**	**6**
26	(England) Matthew Selt	0
39	(China) **Lu Ning**	**6**
10	(Scotland) **Stephen Maguire**	**6**
55	(England) Stuart Carrington	4
106	(China) **Pang Junxu**	**6**
42	(Thailand) Noppon Saengkham	4

Last 32; Best of 11 frames
58	(England) Elliot Slessor	1
39	(China) **Lu Ning**	**6**
10	(Scotland) Stephen Maguire	5
106	(China) **Pang Junxu**	**6**

Last 16; Best of 11 frames
39	(China) **Lu Ning**	**6**
106	(China) Pang Junxu	2

==== Section 8 ====
Last 128; Best of 11 frames
47	Jimmy Robertson (ENG)	5
82	**Igor Figueiredo** (BRA)	**6**
18	**Joe Perry** (ENG)	**6**
107	Alex Borg (MLT)	0
50	**Joe O'Connor** (ENG)	**6**
79	Duane Jones (WAL)	4
15	**Thepchaiya Un-Nooh** (THA)	**6**
114	Lukas Kleckers (GER)	2
34	Martin Gould (ENG)	5
95	**Jordan Brown** (NIR)	**6**
31	Matthew Stevens (WAL)	w/d
98	**Jamie Jones** (WAL)	**w/o**
63	**Alexander Ursenbacher** (SUI)	**6**
66	Nigel Bond (ENG)	3
2	**Ronnie O'Sullivan** (ENG)	**6**
A	Leo Fernandez (IRL)	0

Last 64; Best of 11 frames
82	(Brazil) Igor Figueiredo	2
18	(England) **Joe Perry**	**6**
50	(England) **Joe O'Connor**	**6**
15	(Thailand) Thepchaiya Un-Nooh	3
95	(Northern Ireland) Jordan Brown	4
98	(Wales) **Jamie Jones**	**6**
63	(Switzerland) **Alexander Ursenbacher**	**6**
2	(England) Ronnie O'Sullivan	5

Last 32; Best of 11 frames
18	(England) **Joe Perry**	**6**
50	(England) Joe O'Connor	5
98	(Wales) **Jamie Jones**	**6**
63	(Switzerland) Alexander Ursenbacher	4

Last 16; Best of 11 frames
18	(England) **Joe Perry**	**6**
98	(Wales) Jamie Jones	3

=== Finals ===
**Quarter-finals**; Best of 11 frames
16	(England) Jack Lisowski	4
24	(China) **Zhou Yuelong**	**6**
5	(England) Mark Selby	2
4	(Australia) **Neil Robertson**	**6**
3	(England) **Judd Trump**	**6**
6	(England) Kyren Wilson	4
39	(China) **Lu Ning**	**6**
18	(England) Joe Perry	4

**Semi-finals**; Best of 11 frames
24	(China) Zhou Yuelong	2
4	(Australia) **Neil Robertson**	**6**
3	(England) **Judd Trump**	**6**
39	(China) Lu Ning	2

**Final**; Best of 19 frames
4	(Australia) **Neil Robertson**	**10**
3	(England) Judd Trump	9

=== Final ===
Final: Best of 19 frames. Referee: Olivier Marteel; Marshall Arena, Milton Keynes, England, 6 December 2020.
**Neil Robertson** (4); Australia	**10**–9	Judd Trump (3); England
Afternoon: **55**–31, 36–**78**, **74**–4, 14–**84**, **103**–8 (103), 0–**89**, **110**–22 (110), 0–**128** (128); Evening: 60–**71**, **129**–9, 12–**75**, **65**–28, **78**–37, 59–**83**, 15–**63**, **115**–0 (115), 0–**95**, **72**–48, **53**–43
115	Highest break	**128**
**3**	Century breaks	1

== Century breaks ==
A total of 136 century breaks were made by 60 players during the tournament. Neil Robertson scored 13 total centuries, setting a record for the UK Championship – the previous record of 12 centuries was shared by Stephen Hendry (1994) and Ronnie O'Sullivan (2003).

- 147, 140 – Stuart Bingham
- 147, 132, 132, 107 – Kyren Wilson
- 146, 101 – Hossein Vafaei
- 141, 136, 125 – Kurt Maflin
- 141, 135, 114, 104 – Zhou Yuelong
- 141 – Chen Zifan
- 140, 121, 117, 106 – Mark Selby
- 140 – Yuan Sijun
- 139, 136, 133, 109 – Chang Bingyu
- 139, 106 – Zhao Xintong
- 139 – Shaun Murphy
- 138, 131, 111, 102, 100 – Matthew Selt
- 138, 104 – David Gilbert
- 137, 126 – Graeme Dott
- 137, 121 – Daniel Wells
- 137, 116 – Igor Figueiredo
- 135, 135, 132, 130, 130, 125, 122, 118, 115, 110, 104, 103, 100 – Neil Robertson
- 135, 133, 128, 122, 120, 103 – Stephen Maguire
- 134, 134, 133, 126, 123, 105, 103 – Lu Ning
- 134, 127, 100 – Anthony McGill
- 134, 101, 100 – Li Hang
- 133, 112, 103, 102 – Robert Milkins
- 133, 100 – Gerard Greene
- 132, 107, 100 – Jack Lisowski
- 132 – Mark Allen
- 132 – Gary Wilson
- 131 – Jamie Clarke
- 130 – Ding Junhui
- 130 – Andy Hicks
- 130 – Yan Bingtao
- 128, 118 – Si Jiahui
- 128, 113, 109, 109, 107, 106, 103, 102 – Judd Trump
- 128 – Stuart Carrington
- 125 – Jordan Brown
- 124 – Luo Honghao
- 123 – John Higgins
- 122, 105, 105 – Luca Brecel
- 122 – Barry Hawkins
- 121, 104 – Xiao Guodong
- 121 – Ronnie O'Sullivan
- 120 – Chris Wakelin
- 119, 106 – Mark Williams
- 118, 111, 105 – Elliot Slessor
- 116, 116, 105 – Jimmy Robertson
- 112 – Liam Highfield
- 109 – Jak Jones
- 108 – Joe Perry
- 107 – Sean Maddocks
- 106, 105 – Lyu Haotian
- 105 – Alexander Ursenbacher
- 104 – Ali Carter
- 103, 102 – Pang Junxu
- 102 – Dominic Dale
- 101 – Aaron Hill
- 101 – Allan Taylor
- 100 – Andrew Higginson
- 100 – Simon Lichtenberg
- 100 – Martin O'Donnell
- 100 – Barry Pinches
- 100 – Xu Si
