= Gao Yang (snooker player) =

Chinese professional snooker player

Personal information
- Born: 5 September 2004 (age 22) Hefei, Anhui, China

Sport
- Country: China
- Sport: Snooker
- Professional: 2020–2022, 2025–present
- Highest ranking: 72 (February 2022)
- Current ranking: 74 (as of 7 November 2026)

Gao Yang (Chinese: 高阳; born 5 September 2004) is a Chinese professional snooker player.

== Career ==
Gao Yang started playing on the Chinese tour aged just 13, and was quickly accepted by the CBSA Academy. He played in the ACBS Asian Under-21 Snooker Championship in 2018 and 2019, the IBSF World Under-21 Snooker Championship and IBSF World Under-18 Snooker Championship also in 2018 and 2019. His only real success came in the 2019 IBSF World Under-18 Snooker Championship, where he reached the final, losing 5–2 to the 13-year old Jiang Jun.

His first taste of professional snooker came at the 2019 World Open, where he was a wildcard. Originally Gao's coach Ju Reti had qualified, but gave up his place in order to allow his pupil to gain experience. Gao lost the match 5–1 to Lu Ning.

In January 2020 Gao won the WSF Junior Open, an under-18 tournament. He beat heralded juniors Ben Mertens, Dean Young and Wu Yize, before overcoming Sean Maddocks 5–2 in the final. As a result, he was awarded a two-year card on the World Snooker Tour for the 2020–21 and 2021–22. Even though just 15 years old, he stated that he intended to take up his professional tour card. He thus became the second professional snooker player from Anhui, after his mentor Niu Zhuang.

=== 2020/2021 season ===
As it happened, Gao turned 16 before the start of the 2020–21 season, which was delayed due to COVID-19. His first tournament was the Championship League. Gao made 2-2 draws against Ben Woollaston and Si Jiahui, but lost 3–1 to Matt Selt. He finished his first day as a professional 3rd in the 4-player group but had made two century breaks.

In subsequent tournaments Gao had wins against Zhao Jianbo, Kacper Filipiak, Mitchell Mann and Duane Jones. In the Northern Ireland Open Gao lost 4–0 to World No.1 Judd Trump, who had breaks of 109, 127 and a maximum 147. In the World Championship, Gao beat experienced player Paul Davison 6-3 and played very well against Lyu Haotian to lead 5–3. But his more experienced compatriot won the last 3 frames to edge the match 6–5. Gao finished his debut season ranked 107.

== Style ==
Gao is known as an attacking left-hander. Unusually, he can play with either hand with the rest: with his left-hand he plays underarm in a manner pioneered by the Thai player Sunny Akani.

== Personal life ==
During the season, Gao Yang lives in Sheffield where he practices at the Ding Junhui Snooker Academy.

== Performance and rankings timeline ==
Tournament	2018/ 19	2019/ 20	2020/ 21	2021/ 22	2022/ 23	2023/ 24	2024/ 25	2025/ 26	2026/ 27
Ranking (Note: It shows the ranking at the beginning of the season.)	(Note: He was an amateur)		(Note: New players on the Main Tour don't have a ranking)	75					75
Ranking tournaments
Championship League	Non-Ranking		RR	RR	A	A	A	RR	RR
China Open	A	Tournament Not Held							LQ
Wuhan Open	Tournament Not Held					A	A	LQ	LQ
British Open	Not Held			1R	A	A	A	1R	LQ
English Open	A	A	2R	LQ	A	A	A	LQ	1R
Shenzhen Open (Note: The event was called the Xi'an Grand Prix (2024/2025–2025/2026))	Tournament Not Held						A	LQ	LQ
Northern Ireland Open	A	A	2R	1R	A	A	A	LQ	2R
International Championship	A	A	Not Held			A	A	LQ	1R
UK Championship	A	A	1R	2R	A	LQ	A	LQ	
Shoot Out	A	A	WD	2R	A	A	A	2R	
Scottish Open	A	A	2R	1R	A	A	A	1R	
German Masters	A	A	LQ	WD	A	A	A	1R	LQ
Welsh Open	A	A	1R	LQ	A	A	A	1R	
World Grand Prix	DNQ	DNQ	DNQ	DNQ	DNQ	DNQ	DNQ	DNQ	
Players Championship	DNQ	DNQ	DNQ	DNQ	DNQ	DNQ	DNQ	DNQ	
World Open	A	LQ	Not Held			A	A	LQ	
Tour Championship	DNQ	DNQ	DNQ	DNQ	DNQ	DNQ	DNQ	DNQ	
World Championship	A	A	LQ	LQ	LQ	LQ	LQ	LQ	
Former ranking tournaments
WST Pro Series	Not Held		RR	Tournament Not Held					
Turkish Masters	Not Held			LQ	Tournament Not Held				
Gibraltar Open	A	A	1R	2R	Tournament Not Held				
European Masters	A	A	2R	1R	A	A	Not Held		
Saudi Arabia Masters	Tournament Not Held						A	3R	NH
Former non-ranking tournaments
Haining Open	2R	2R	NH	A	A	Tournament Not Held			

Performance Table Legend
LQ	lost in the qualifying draw	#R	lost in the early rounds of the tournament (WR = Wildcard round, RR = Round robin)	QF	lost in the quarter-finals
SF	lost in the semi-finals	F	lost in the final	W	won the tournament
DNQ	did not qualify for the tournament	A	did not participate in the tournament	WD	withdrew from the tournament

NH / Not Held	means an event was not held
NR / Non-Ranking Event	means an event is/was no longer a ranking event
R / Ranking Event	means an event is/was a ranking event
MR / Minor-Ranking Event	means an event is/was a minor-ranking event

== Career finals ==
=== Amateur finals: 4 (2 titles) ===
Outcome	No.	Year	Championship	Opponent in the final	Score
Runner-up	1.	2019	IBSF World Under-18 Snooker Championship	(China) Jiang Jun	2–5
Winner	1.	2020	WSF Junior Open	(England) Sean Maddocks	5–2
Runner-up	2.	2024	WSF Open	(Hong Kong) Cheung Ka Wai	0–5
Winner	2.	2025	WSF Championship	(Malta) Brian Cini	5–3
