= 2020 Northern Ireland Open =

2020 Matchroom.live Northern Ireland Open
Tournament information
- Dates: 16–22 November 2020
- Venue: Marshall Arena
- City: Milton Keynes
- Country: England
- Organisation: World Snooker Tour
- Format: Ranking event
- Total prize fund: £405,000
- Winner's share: £70,000
- Highest break: Judd Trump (ENG) (147)

Final
- Champion: Judd Trump (ENG)
- Runner-up: Ronnie O'Sullivan (ENG)
- Score: 9–7

The 2020 Northern Ireland Open (officially the 2020 Matchroom.live Northern Ireland Open) was a professional ranking snooker tournament that took place from 16 to 22 November 2020 at the Marshall Arena in Milton Keynes, England. It was the fourth ranking event of the 2020–21 season and a part of the Home Nations Series. It was the fifth edition of the Northern Ireland Open.

For the third consecutive edition of the tournament, Judd Trump defeated Ronnie O'Sullivan 9–7 in the final, winning his 19th ranking title. He is the first player to win a ranking event three times in a row since Stephen Hendry won the UK Championship from 1994 to 1996. He is also the first to win four Home Nations Series titles, and the second, after Mark Selby, to win two Home Nations events in a single season. During this tournament, he made the fifth maximum break of his career in the third frame of his second-round match with Gao Yang.

== Prize fund ==
The breakdown of prize money for this year is shown below:

- Winner: £70,000
- Runner-up: £30,000
- Semi-final: £20,000
- Quarter-final: £10,000
- Last 16: £7,500
- Last 32: £4,000
- Last 64: £3,000
- Highest break: £5,000
- Total: £405,000

== Main draw ==
=== Top half ===
==== Section 1 ====
Last 128; Best of 7 frames
Judd Trump (ENG) (1)	4
Gerard Greene (NIR)	1
Mitchell Mann (ENG)	2
Gao Yang (CHN)	4
Luca Brecel (BEL) (32)	4
Kacper Filipiak (POL)	0
Simon Lichtenberg (GER)	1
Rod Lawler (ENG)	4
Jack Lisowski (ENG) (16)	1
Ashley Carty (ENG)	4
Paul Davison (ENG)	3
Andy Hicks (ENG)	4
Gary Wilson (ENG) (17)	2
Rory McLeod (JAM)	4
Martin Gould (ENG)	4
Jamie Clarke (WAL)	0

Last 64; Best of 7 frames
(England) Judd Trump (1)	4
(China) Gao Yang	0
(Belgium) Luca Brecel (32)	4
(England) Rod Lawler	1
(England) Ashley Carty	1
(England) Andy Hicks	4
(Jamaica) Rory McLeod	1
(England) Martin Gould	4

Last 32; Best of 7 frames
(England) Judd Trump (1)	4
(Belgium) Luca Brecel (32)	3
(England) Andy Hicks	3
(England) Martin Gould	4

Last 16; Best of 7 frames
(England) Judd Trump (1)	4
(England) Martin Gould	1

==== Section 2 ====
Last 128; Best of 7 frames
Tian Pengfei (CHN)	w/d
Noppon Saengkham (THA)	w/o
Zhou Yuelong (CHN) (24)	4
Jimmy White (ENG)	0
Alexander Ursenbacher (SUI)	4
Lei Peifan (CHN)	2
Stephen Maguire (SCO) (9)	4
Alex Borg (MLT)	2
Chen Zifan (CHN)	1
Xu Si (CHN)	4
Scott Donaldson (SCO) (25)	4
Sean Maddocks (ENG)	1
Fan Zhengyi (CHN)	0
Robert Milkins (ENG)	4
Mark Allen (NIR) (8)	4
Anthony Hamilton (ENG)	0

Last 64; Best of 7 frames
(Thailand) Noppon Saengkham	4
(China) Zhou Yuelong (24)	3
(Switzerland) Alexander Ursenbacher	1
(Scotland) Stephen Maguire (9)	4
(China) Xu Si	3
(Scotland) Scott Donaldson (25)	4
(England) Robert Milkins	2
(Northern Ireland) Mark Allen (8)	4

Last 32; Best of 7 frames
(Thailand) Noppon Saengkham	4
(Scotland) Stephen Maguire (9)	0
(Scotland) Scott Donaldson (25)	4
(Northern Ireland) Mark Allen (8)	1

Last 16; Best of 7 frames
(Thailand) Noppon Saengkham	2
(Scotland) Scott Donaldson (25)	4

==== Section 3 ====
Last 128; Best of 7 frames
Kyren Wilson (ENG) (5)	4
David Lilley (ENG)	0
Ken Doherty (IRL)	4
Chris Wakelin (ENG)	1
Michael Holt (ENG) (28)	4
Soheil Vahedi (IRN)	1
Brandon Sargeant (ENG)	2
Louis Heathcote (ENG)	4
David Gilbert (ENG) (12)	1
David Grace (ENG)	4
Sam Craigie (ENG)	4
Amine Amiri (MAR)	0
Barry Hawkins (ENG) (21)	4
Alan McManus (SCO)	2
Iulian Boiko (UKR)	0
Michael White (WAL)	4

Last 64; Best of 7 frames
(England) Kyren Wilson (5)	4
(Republic of Ireland) Ken Doherty	3
(England) Michael Holt (28)	4
(England) Louis Heathcote	3
(England) David Grace	4
(England) Sam Craigie	3
(England) Barry Hawkins (21)	3
(Wales) Michael White	4

Last 32; Best of 7 frames
(England) Kyren Wilson (5)	2
(England) Michael Holt (28)	4
(England) David Grace	4
(Wales) Michael White	3

Last 16; Best of 7 frames
(England) Michael Holt (28)	3
(England) David Grace	4

==== Section 4 ====
Last 128; Best of 7 frames
Barry Pinches (ENG)	4
Liam Highfield (ENG)	2
(Scotland) Anthony McGill (20)	w/o
Riley Parsons (ENG)	w/d
Jamie Wilson (ENG)	1
Nigel Bond (ENG)	4
Yan Bingtao (CHN) (13)	4
Peter Lines (ENG)	1
Mark King (ENG)	2
Zak Surety (ENG)	4
Zhao Xintong (CHN) (29)	4
Si Jiahui (CHN)	2
Lukas Kleckers (GER)	4
Chang Bingyu (CHN)	1
Mark Selby (ENG) (4)	4
Andrew Higginson (ENG)	1

Last 64; Best of 7 frames
(England) Barry Pinches	4
(Scotland) Anthony McGill (20)	3
(England) Nigel Bond	1
(China) Yan Bingtao (13)	4
(England) Zak Surety	1
(China) Zhao Xintong (29)	4
(Germany) Lukas Kleckers	4
(England) Mark Selby (4)	0

Last 32; Best of 7 frames
(England) Barry Pinches	1
(China) Yan Bingtao (13)	4
(China) Zhao Xintong (29)	4
(Germany) Lukas Kleckers	0

Last 16; Best of 7 frames
(China) Yan Bingtao (13)	4
(China) Zhao Xintong (29)	3

=== Bottom half ===
==== Section 5 ====
Last 128; Best of 7 frames
(Australia) Neil Robertson (3)	w/o
Declan Lavery (NIR)	w/d
Ben Woollaston (ENG)	4
Ricky Walden (ENG)	3
Liang Wenbo (CHN) (30)	4
Steven Hallworth (ENG)	3
Pang Junxu (CHN)	0
Jak Jones (WAL)	4
Mark Williams (WAL) (14)	4
Jamie Jones (WAL)	2
Mark Joyce (ENG)	2
Dominic Dale (WAL)	4
Ali Carter (ENG) (19)	4
Ben Hancorn (ENG)	1
Xiao Guodong (CHN)	4
Duane Jones (WAL)	1

Last 64; Best of 7 frames
(Australia) Neil Robertson (3)	2
(England) Ben Woollaston	4
(China) Liang Wenbo (30)	4
(Wales) Jak Jones	1
(Wales) Mark Williams (14)	2
(Wales) Dominic Dale	4
(England) Ali Carter (19)	4
(China) Xiao Guodong	1

Last 32; Best of 7 frames
(England) Ben Woollaston	4
(China) Liang Wenbo (30)	2
(Wales) Dominic Dale	2
(England) Ali Carter (19)	4

Last 16; Best of 7 frames
(England) Ben Woollaston	2
(England) Ali Carter (19)	4

==== Section 6 ====
Last 128; Best of 7 frames
Sunny Akani (THA)	4
Jordan Brown (NIR)	3
Graeme Dott (SCO) (22)	2
Igor Figueiredo (BRA)	4
Zhao Jianbo (CHN)	4
Brian Ochoiski (FRA)	1
Stuart Bingham (ENG) (11)	4
Oliver Lines (ENG)	1
Aaron Hill (IRL)	3
Jackson Page (WAL)	4
Kurt Maflin (NOR) (27)	4
Fraser Patrick (SCO)	1
James Cahill (ENG)	4
Lyu Haotian (CHN)	1
Shaun Murphy (ENG) (6)	0
Ryan Day (WAL)	4

Last 64; Best of 7 frames
(Thailand) Sunny Akani	2
(Brazil) Igor Figueiredo	4
(China) Zhao Jianbo	4
(England) Stuart Bingham (11)	2
(Wales) Jackson Page	0
(Norway) Kurt Maflin (27)	4
(England) James Cahill	3
(Wales) Ryan Day	4

Last 32; Best of 7 frames
(Brazil) Igor Figueiredo	4
(China) Zhao Jianbo	3
(Norway) Kurt Maflin (27)	4
(Wales) Ryan Day	1

Last 16; Best of 7 frames
(Brazil) Igor Figueiredo	1
(Norway) Kurt Maflin (27)	4

==== Section 7 ====
Last 128; Best of 7 frames
John Higgins (SCO) (7)	4
Daniel Wells (WAL)	0
Patrick Wallace (NIR)	4
Farakh Ajaib (ENG)	1
Matthew Selt (ENG) (26)	4
Joe O'Connor (ENG)	3
Stuart Carrington (ENG)	4
Billy Castle (ENG)	1
Ding Junhui (CHN) (10)	4
Eden Sharav (ISR)	0
Martin O'Donnell (ENG)	1
Lu Ning (CHN)	4
Tom Ford (ENG) (23)	4
Lee Walker (WAL)	2
Yuan Sijun (CHN)	4
Luo Honghao (CHN)	3

Last 64; Best of 7 frames
(Scotland) John Higgins (7)	4
(Northern Ireland) Patrick Wallace	2
(England) Matthew Selt (26)	4
(England) Stuart Carrington	0
(China) Ding Junhui (10)	4
(China) Lu Ning	1
(England) Tom Ford (23)	2
(China) Yuan Sijun	4

Last 32; Best of 7 frames
(Scotland) John Higgins (7)	4
(England) Matthew Selt (26)	0
(China) Ding Junhui (10)	4
(China) Yuan Sijun	0

Last 16; Best of 7 frames
(Scotland) John Higgins (7)	1
(China) Ding Junhui (10)	4

==== Section 8 ====
Last 128; Best of 7 frames
Allan Taylor (ENG)	4
Hossein Vafaei (IRN)	2
Joe Perry (ENG) (18)	4
Robbie Williams (ENG)	0
Fergal O'Brien (IRL)	4
Ashley Hugill (ENG)	2
Thepchaiya Un-Nooh (THA) (15)	4
Peter Devlin (ENG)	2
Mark Davis (ENG)	4
Ian Burns (ENG)	3
Matthew Stevens (WAL) (31)	4
Jimmy Robertson (ENG)	2
Elliot Slessor (ENG)	4
Li Hang (CHN)	1
Ronnie O'Sullivan (ENG) (2)	4
Jamie O'Neill (ENG)	1

Last 64; Best of 7 frames
(England) Allan Taylor	4
(England) Joe Perry (18)	1
(Republic of Ireland) Fergal O'Brien	1
(Thailand) Thepchaiya Un-Nooh (15)	4
(England) Mark Davis	2
(Wales) Matthew Stevens (31)	4
(England) Elliot Slessor	1
(England) Ronnie O'Sullivan (2)	4

Last 32; Best of 7 frames
(England) Allan Taylor	0
(Thailand) Thepchaiya Un-Nooh (15)	4
(Wales) Matthew Stevens (31)	2
(England) Ronnie O'Sullivan (2)	4

Last 16; Best of 7 frames
(Thailand) Thepchaiya Un-Nooh (15)	2
(England) Ronnie O'Sullivan (2)	4

=== Finals ===
Quarter-finals; Best of 9 frames
(England) Judd Trump (1)	5
(Scotland) Scott Donaldson (25)	1
(England) David Grace	5
(China) Yan Bingtao (13)	2
(England) Ali Carter (19)	5
(Norway) Kurt Maflin (27)	3
(China) Ding Junhui (10)	2
(England) Ronnie O'Sullivan (2)	5

Semi-finals; Best of 11 frames
(England) Judd Trump (1)	6
(England) David Grace	2
(England) Ali Carter (19)	3
(England) Ronnie O'Sullivan (2)	6

Final; Best of 17 frames
(England) Judd Trump (1)	9
(England) Ronnie O'Sullivan (2)	7

=== Final ===
Final: Best of 17 frames. Referee: Marcel Eckardt. Marshall Arena, Milton Keynes, England, 22 November 2020.
Judd Trump (1); England	9–7	Ronnie O'Sullivan (2); England
Afternoon: 69–55, 77–47, 41–64, 86–35, 70–43, 13–70, 128–0 (128), 7–130 (130); Evening: 89–55, 81–51, 41–81, 37–72, 115–0 (115), 7–93, 0–74, 89–32
128	Highest break	130
2	Century breaks	1

== Century breaks ==
A total of 68 century breaks were made during the competition.

- 147, 128, 127, 115, 112, 109, 105, 103, 101 – Judd Trump
- 144, 130 – John Higgins
- 142 – Anthony McGill
- 141 – Ashley Carty
- 137, 125, 103 – Yan Bingtao
- 135, 135, 127, 112 – Kurt Maflin
- 135 – Kyren Wilson
- 134, 130, 118, 101 – Ben Woollaston
- 134, 109, 109, 100 – Zhao Xintong
- 133 – Luca Brecel
- 133 – Chang Bingyu
- 133 – Mark Williams
- 130, 125, 111 – Mark Allen
- 130, 125, 106, 103, 102, 100 – Ronnie O'Sullivan
- 130 – Stuart Bingham
- 127, 116 – Patrick Wallace
- 122 – Lee Walker
- 121, 107, 100 – Ding Junhui
- 121, 106 – Liang Wenbo
- 117, 101 – Martin Gould
- 114 – Lu Ning
- 113, 107 – Ryan Day
- 109 – Andy Hicks
- 108, 103, 101, 100 – Ali Carter
- 104 – David Grace
- 104 – Barry Hawkins
- 104 – Robert Milkins
- 103 – Stephen Maguire
- 102 – Alex Borg
- 102 – Liam Highfield
- 101, 101 – Ken Doherty
