= 2021 Gibraltar Open =

Snooker tournament

2021 BetVictor Gibraltar Open
Tournament information
- Dates: 1–7 March 2021
- Venue: Marshall Arena
- City: Milton Keynes
- Country: England
- Organisation: World Snooker Tour
- Format: Ranking event
- Total prize fund: £251,000
- Winner's share: £50,000
- Highest break: Jamie Jones (WAL) (145)

Final
- Champion: Judd Trump (ENG)
- Runner-up: Jack Lisowski (ENG)
- Score: 4–0

The 2021 Gibraltar Open (officially the 2021 BetVictor Gibraltar Open) was a professional snooker tournament that took place from 1 to 7 March 2021 at the Marshall Arena in Milton Keynes, England. It was the twelfth ranking event of the 2020–21 snooker season, and the sixth and final event in the BetVictor European Series.

The event was the sixth instalment of the Gibraltar Open tournament, first held in 2015. It was organised by the World Professional Billiards and Snooker Association and sponsored by BetVictor. The defending champion was Judd Trump, who defeated Kyren Wilson 4–3 in the 2020 final. Trump retained his title, defeating Jack Lisowski 4–0 in the final and losing just three of the 31 frames he played in the tournament overall. It was Trump's fifth ranking title of the season and the 22nd of his professional career. In addition to the winner's prize of £50,000, Trump secured the £150,000 European Series bonus, awarded to the player who wins the most prize money across the series, for a second consecutive season.

The event featured the return to the professional tour of seven-time world champion Stephen Hendry, who retired in 2012, but accepted a two-year invitational tour card to begin in the 2020–21 season. Matthew Selt beat Hendry 4–1 in the first round of the tournament.

== Prize fund ==
The breakdown of the tournament's prize money is shown below:

- Winner: £50,000
- Runner-up: £20,000
- Semi-final: £6,000
- Quarter-final: £5,000
- Last 16: £4,000
- Last 32: £3,000
- Last 64: £2,000
- Highest break: £5,000
- Total: £251,000

== Tournament draw ==
Below is the full draw for the event. Players in bold denote match winners.

=== Top half ===
==== Section 1 ====
Last 128; Best of 7 frames
**Judd Trump (ENG) (1)**	**4**
Robbie Williams (ENG)	1
Haydon Pinhey (ENG)	1
**Sunny Akani (THA)**	**4**
Brian Ochoiski (FRA)	1
**Liang Wenbo (CHN)**	**4**
**Robert Milkins (ENG)**	**4**
Gary Wilson (ENG)	3
**Zhou Yuelong (CHN) (16)**	**4**
Xu Si (CHN)	0
Yuan Sijun (CHN)	1
**Alexander Ursenbacher (SUI)**	**4**
**David Lilley (ENG)**	**4**
Duane Jones (WAL)	2
**Mitchell Mann (ENG)**	**4**
Lukas Kleckers (GER)	0

Last 64; Best of 7 frames
**(England) Judd Trump (1)**	**4**
(Thailand) Sunny Akani	1
(China) Liang Wenbo	3
**(England) Robert Milkins**	**4**
(China) Zhou Yuelong (16)	1
**(Switzerland) Alexander Ursenbacher**	**4**
(England) David Lilley	3
**(England) Mitchell Mann**	**4**

Last 32; Best of 7 frames
**(England) Judd Trump (1)**	**4**
(England) Robert Milkins	0
**(Switzerland) Alexander Ursenbacher**	**4**
(England) Mitchell Mann	0

Last 16; Best of 7 frames
**(England) Judd Trump (1)**	**4**
(Switzerland) Alexander Ursenbacher	0

==== Section 2 ====
Last 128; Best of 7 frames
Rory McLeod (JAM)	1
**Hossein Vafaei (IRN)**	**4**
Andy Hicks (ENG)	1
**Allan Taylor (ENG)**	**4**
**Iulian Boiko (UKR)**	**4**
Fergal O'Brien (IRL)	3
**Mark Allen (NIR) (9)**	**4**
Jamie Curtis-Barrett (ENG)	0
**Scott Donaldson (SCO)**	**4**
Peter Lines (ENG)	2
**Joe Perry (ENG)**	**4**
Mark Davis (ENG)	2
**Ricky Walden (ENG)**	**4**
Mark Joyce (ENG)	3
Ding Junhui (CHN) (8)	2
**Si Jiahui (CHN)**	**4**

Last 64; Best of 7 frames
**(Iran) Hossein Vafaei**	**4**
(England) Allan Taylor	1
(Ukraine) Iulian Boiko	3
**(Northern Ireland) Mark Allen (9)**	**4**
(Scotland) Scott Donaldson	2
**(England) Joe Perry**	**4**
**(England) Ricky Walden**	**4**
(China) Si Jiahui	3

Last 32; Best of 7 frames
(Iran) Hossein Vafaei	2
**(Northern Ireland) Mark Allen (9)**	**4**
(England) Joe Perry	2
**(England) Ricky Walden**	**4**

Last 16; Best of 7 frames
**(Northern Ireland) Mark Allen (9)**	**4**
(England) Ricky Walden	1

==== Section 3 ====
Last 128; Best of 7 frames
**Kyren Wilson (ENG) (5)**	**4**
Kuldesh Johal (ENG)	2
Oliver Brown (ENG)	1
**Fan Zhengyi (CHN)**	**4**
**Matthew Selt (ENG)**	**4**
Stephen Hendry (SCO)	1
**Barry Hawkins (ENG)**	**4**
Luo Honghao (CHN)	2
**Mark Williams (WAL) (12)**	**4**
Li Hang (CHN)	1
Michael White (WAL)	2
**Soheil Vahedi (IRN)**	**4**
Zak Surety (ENG)	2
**Tom Ford (ENG)**	**4**
Steven Hallworth (ENG)	2
**Jamie Jones (WAL)**	**4**

Last 64; Best of 7 frames
**(England) Kyren Wilson (5)**	**4**
(China) Fan Zhengyi	0
**(England) Matthew Selt**	**4**
(England) Barry Hawkins	3
(Wales) Mark Williams (12)	3
**(Iran) Soheil Vahedi**	**4**
**(England) Tom Ford**	**4**
(Wales) Jamie Jones	2

Last 32; Best of 7 frames
(England) Kyren Wilson (5)	3
**(England) Matthew Selt**	**4**
**(Iran) Soheil Vahedi**	**4**
(England) Tom Ford	0

Last 16; Best of 7 frames
**(England) Matthew Selt**	**4**
(Iran) Soheil Vahedi	1

==== Section 4 ====
Last 128; Best of 7 frames
**Chen Zifan (CHN)**	**4**
Daniel Womersley (ENG)	1
Ian Burns (ENG)	1
**Leo Fernandez (IRL)**	**4**
**Jimmy White (ENG)**	**4**
Joe O'Connor (ENG)	3
**Stuart Bingham (ENG) (13)**	**4**
Gerard Greene (NIR)	0
**Chang Bingyu (CHN)**	**4**
Eden Sharav (ISR)	3
Nigel Bond (ENG)	3
**Chris Wakelin (ENG)**	**4**
**Ken Doherty (IRL)**	**4**
Matthew Stevens (WAL)	3
**Mark Selby (ENG) (4)**	**4**
Sam Craigie (ENG)	1

Last 64; Best of 7 frames
**(China) Chen Zifan**	**4**
(Republic of Ireland) Leo Fernandez	3
**(England) Jimmy White**	**4**
(England) Stuart Bingham (13)	2
(China) Chang Bingyu	2
**(England) Chris Wakelin**	**4**
(Republic of Ireland) Ken Doherty	2
**(England) Mark Selby (4)**	**4**

Last 32; Best of 7 frames
(China) Chen Zifan	3
**(England) Jimmy White**	**4**
**(England) Chris Wakelin**	**4**
(England) Mark Selby (4)	2

Last 16; Best of 7 frames
(England) Jimmy White	2
**(England) Chris Wakelin**	**4**

=== Bottom half ===
==== Section 5 ====
Last 128; Best of 7 frames
Neil Robertson (AUS) (3)	2
**Lei Peifan (CHN)**	**4**
**Dylan Emery (WAL)**	**4**
Ben Hancorn (ENG)	0
**Andrew Higginson (ENG)**	**4**
Lyu Haotian (CHN)	3
**Stuart Carrington (ENG)**	**4**
Gao Yang (CHN)	0
**David Gilbert (ENG) (14)**	**4**
Paul Davison (ENG)	1
**Jimmy Robertson (ENG)**	**4**
James Cahill (ENG)	2
**Zhao Xintong (CHN)**	**4**
Ashley Carty (ENG)	1
Peter Devlin (ENG)	3
**Daniel Wells (WAL)**	**4**

Last 64; Best of 7 frames
**(China) Lei Peifan**	**4**
(Wales) Dylan Emery	3
(England) Andrew Higginson	2
**(England) Stuart Carrington**	**4**
**(England) David Gilbert (14)**	**4**
(England) Jimmy Robertson	3
**(China) Zhao Xintong**	**4**
(Wales) Daniel Wells	2

Last 32; Best of 7 frames
(China) Lei Peifan	1
**(England) Stuart Carrington**	**4**
**(England) David Gilbert (14)**	**4**
(China) Zhao Xintong	0

Last 16; Best of 7 frames
**(England) Stuart Carrington**	**4**
(England) David Gilbert (14)	0

==== Section 6 ====
Last 128; Best of 7 frames
**Elliot Slessor (ENG)**	**4**
Jackson Page (WAL)	3
**Martin Gould (ENG)**	**4**
David Grace (ENG)	2
Brandon Sargeant (ENG)	1
**Aaron Hill (IRL)**	**4**
Yan Bingtao (CHN) (11)	1
**Jamie Clarke (WAL)**	**4**
Kacper Filipiak (POL)	0
**Alan McManus (SCO)**	**4**
**Zhao Jianbo (CHN)**	**4**
Noppon Saengkham (THA)	0
Martin O'Donnell (ENG)	2
**Xiao Guodong (CHN)**	**4**
Hamim Hussain (ENG)	0
**Jamie Wilson (ENG)**	**4**

Last 64; Best of 7 frames
(England) Elliot Slessor	2
**(England) Martin Gould**	**4**
(Republic of Ireland) Aaron Hill	2
**(Wales) Jamie Clarke**	**4**
(Scotland) Alan McManus	1
**(China) Zhao Jianbo**	**4**
**(China) Xiao Guodong**	**4**
(England) Jamie Wilson	1

Last 32; Best of 7 frames
(England) Martin Gould	3
**(Wales) Jamie Clarke**	**4**
(China) Zhao Jianbo	1
**(China) Xiao Guodong**	**4**

Last 16; Best of 7 frames
(Wales) Jamie Clarke	1
**(China) Xiao Guodong**	**4**

==== Section 7 ====
Last 128; Best of 7 frames
**Shaun Murphy (ENG) (7)**	**4**
Ashley Hugill (ENG)	2
Mark King (ENG)	1
**Luca Brecel (BEL)**	**4**
Dominic Dale (WAL)	0
**Tian Pengfei (CHN)**	**4**
Barry Pinches (ENG)	2
**Anthony Hamilton (ENG)**	**4**
**Jack Lisowski (ENG) (10)**	**4**
Farakh Ajaib (PAK)	1
**Jak Jones (WAL)**	**4**
Ryan Day (WAL)	3
**Oliver Lines (ENG)**	**4**
Riley Parsons (ENG)	1
Liam Highfield (ENG)	3
**Fraser Patrick (SCO)**	**4**

Last 64; Best of 7 frames
**(England) Shaun Murphy (7)**	**4**
(Belgium) Luca Brecel	1
(China) Tian Pengfei	0
**(England) Anthony Hamilton**	**4**
**(England) Jack Lisowski (10)**	**4**
(Wales) Jak Jones	1
(England) Oliver Lines	3
**(Scotland) Fraser Patrick**	**4**

Last 32; Best of 7 frames
(England) Shaun Murphy (7)	1
**(England) Anthony Hamilton**	**4**
**(England) Jack Lisowski (10)**	**4**
(Scotland) Fraser Patrick	2

Last 16; Best of 7 frames
(England) Anthony Hamilton	1
**(England) Jack Lisowski (10)**	**4**

==== Section 8 ====
Last 128; Best of 7 frames
Simon Lichtenberg (GER)	3
**Lu Ning (CHN)**	**4**
Lee Walker (WAL)	2
**Jamie O'Neill (ENG)**	**4**
**Pang Junxu (CHN)**	**4**
Igor Figueiredo (BRA)	3
**Anthony McGill (SCO) (15)**	**4**
Louis Heathcote (ENG)	0
**Rod Lawler (ENG)**	**4**
Jordan Brown (NIR)	3
**Thepchaiya Un-Nooh (THA)**	**4**
Sean Maddocks (ENG)	0
Billy Castle (ENG)	3
**Ben Woollaston (ENG)**	**4**
John Astley (ENG)	2
**Ali Carter (ENG)**	**4**

Last 64; Best of 7 frames
**(China) Lu Ning**	**4**
(England) Jamie O'Neill	0
**(China) Pang Junxu**	**4**
(Scotland) Anthony McGill (15)	2
(England) Rod Lawler	3
**(Thailand) Thepchaiya Un-Nooh**	**4**
(England) Ben Woollaston	2
**(England) Ali Carter**	**4**

Last 32; Best of 7 frames
**(China) Lu Ning**	**4**
(China) Pang Junxu	2
**(Thailand) Thepchaiya Un-Nooh**	**4**
(England) Ali Carter	2

Last 16; Best of 7 frames
**(China) Lu Ning**	**4**
(Thailand) Thepchaiya Un-Nooh	2

=== Finals ===
**Quarter-finals**; Best of 7 frames
**(England) Judd Trump (1)**	**4**
(Northern Ireland) Mark Allen (9)	0
**(England) Matthew Selt**	**4**
(England) Chris Wakelin	0
**(England) Stuart Carrington**	**4**
(China) Xiao Guodong	1
**(England) Jack Lisowski (10)**	**4**
(China) Lu Ning	3

**Semi-finals**; Best of 7 frames
**(England) Judd Trump (1)**	**4**
(England) Matthew Selt	1
(England) Stuart Carrington	3
**(England) Jack Lisowski (10)**	**4**

**Final**; Best of 7 frames
**(England) Judd Trump (1)**	**4**
(England) Jack Lisowski (10)	0

=== Final ===
Final: Best of 7 frames. Referee: Colin Humphries; Marshall Arena, Milton Keynes, 7 March 2021
**Judd Trump** (1); England	**4**–0	Jack Lisowski (10); England
Frames: **72**–18, **106**–0 (106), **73**–46, **94**–0
**106**	Highest break	31
**1**	Century breaks	0

== Century breaks ==
A total of 80 century breaks were made during the tournament.

- 145, 103 – Jamie Jones
- 142, 137, 130, 124 – Mark Selby
- 140, 113 – Shaun Murphy
- 140 – Scott Donaldson
- 138 – Riley Parsons
- 137, 126, 103 – Jack Lisowski
- 137 – Chris Wakelin
- 134, 114 – Jamie Clarke
- 132, 115 – Fraser Patrick
- 132, 105 – Chen Zifan
- 131, 128, 126, 124, 124, 106, 104, 101 – Judd Trump
- 130, 129, 103 – Barry Hawkins
- 127, 115, 107 – Stuart Carrington
- 126 – Mark Allen
- 125 – Mitchell Mann
- 124, 107 – David Gilbert
- 124 – Luo Honghao
- 123, 102 – Soheil Vahedi
- 121, 115, 113, 109, 101 – Xiao Guodong
- 119, 102 – Matthew Selt
- 119 – Thepchaiya Un-Nooh
- 118 – Anthony McGill
- 116 – Ashley Hugill
- 116 – Elliot Slessor
- 115, 109, 105 – Kyren Wilson
- 113 – Anthony Hamilton
- 112, 100 – Luca Brecel
- 109, 106 – Liam Highfield
- 108 – Ricky Walden
- 107, 105, 100 – Ali Carter
- 107 – Stephen Hendry
- 107 – Lu Ning
- 106, 102 – Liang Wenbo
- 105 – Hossein Vafaei
- 104 – Tom Ford
- 104 – Pang Junxu
- 103 – Oliver Lines
- 103 – Mark Williams
- 102 – Billy Castle
- 101, 101 – Jamie O'Neill
- 101 – Chang Bingyu
- 101 – Si Jiahui
- 100 – Martin Gould
- 100 – Sunny Akani
