= Lu Ning =

Chinese snooker player (born 1994)

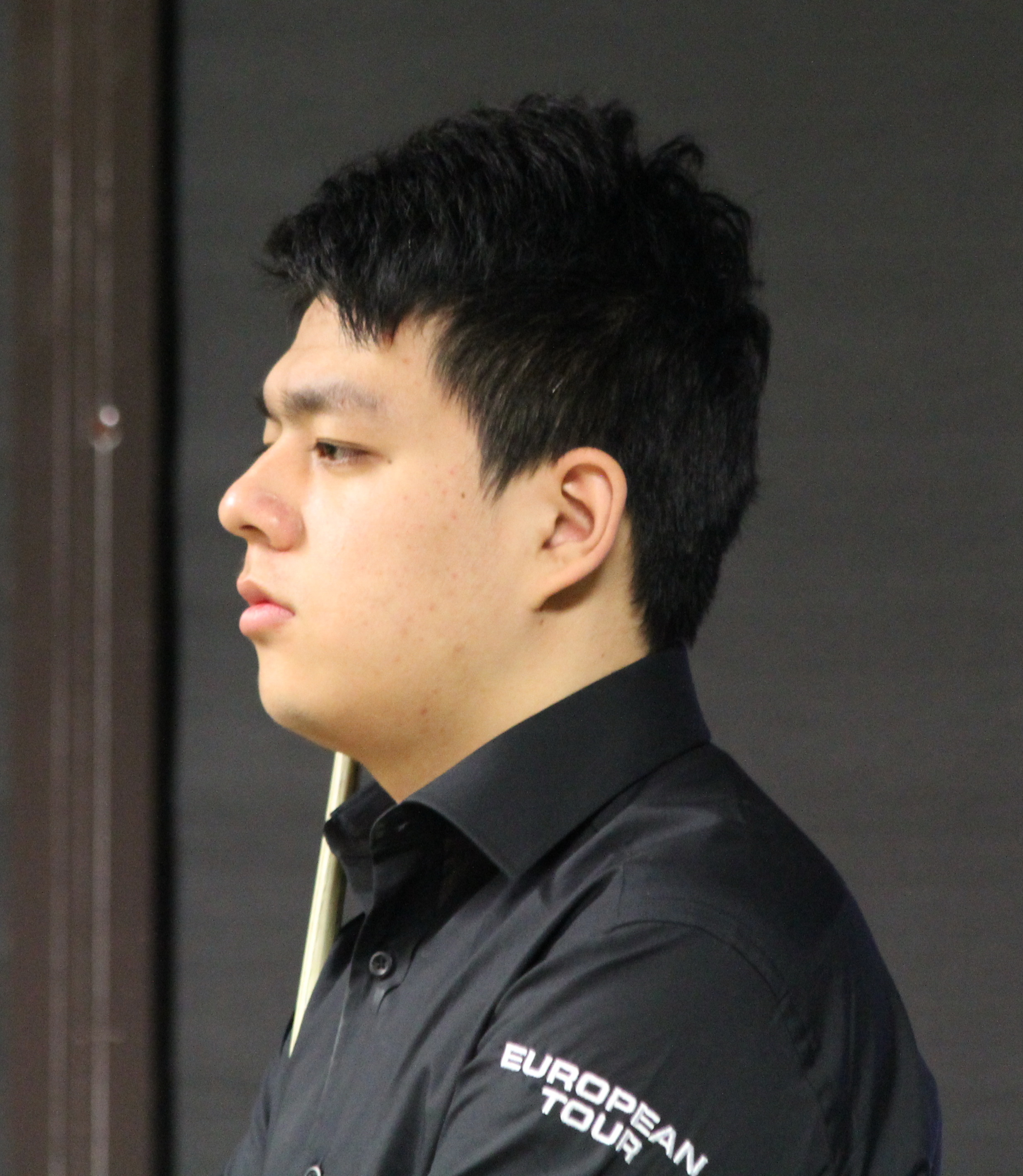
- Paul Hunter Classic 2014

Personal information
- Born: 1 January 1994 (age 32) Jilin, China

Sport
- Country: China
- Sport: Snooker
- Professional: 2014–2016, 2018–2023
- Highest ranking: 28 (November 2021)
- Best ranking finish: Runner-up (x1)

Lu Ning (Chinese: 鲁宁; born 1 January 1994 in Jilin) is a former professional snooker player from the People's Republic of China who, in 2023, was banned from professional competition for five years and four months after committing match-fixing offences.

In December 2022, Lu was suspended from the professional tour amid a match-fixing investigation. In January 2023, he was charged with being concerned in fixing matches and approaching players to fix matches, seeking to obstruct a WPBSA investigation, and betting on snooker matches. Following an independent disciplinary tribunal, Lu was banned from professional snooker until 6 April 2028.

== Career ==
Lu's first appearance in a ranking tournament was in the wildcard round of the 2012 World Open, where he defeated 1996 British Open winner Nigel Bond 5–4 in Haikou. He met Mark Selby in the first round and, despite taking the first two frames, Lu lost 3–5. Lu continued to show his talent in the next local ranking tournament, the 2012 China Open. He was awarded a wildcard to compete against Welsh player Jamie Jones, where Lu won 5–3. He won against 2005 world snooker champion Shaun Murphy by 5–2, with two centuries. However, in the second round Ali Carter won 5–1.

=== 2012–13 season ===
In the 2012/2013 season Lu was awarded a place in the wildcard round for five ranking events, losing at this stage in four of them. At the International Championship he beat Barry Pinches 6–5, before losing in the first round 6–4 to Ricky Walden. He played in all three of the new Asian Players Tour Championships, but could not advance beyond the third round in any of them to finish 45th on the Asian Order of Merit.

=== 2013–14 season ===
In July 2013 he became the IBSF Under 21 World Champion, defeating Zhou Yuelong 9–4 in the final. He came through the wildcard round of the Wuxi Classic by beating Adam Duffy 5–3, before losing 5–1 to Matthew Stevens. His Under-21 title earned him a two-year main tour card starting with the 2014/2015 season.

=== 2014–15 season ===
Lu failed to qualify for any ranking events besides the UK Championship and the Welsh Open for which all players on the tour gain automatic entry at the venue stage. Lu lost 6–2 to Stephen Maguire in the first round of the UK and 4–0 to Ricky Walden at the Welsh. He was placed world number 114 after his first season as a professional.

=== 2015–16 season ===
It was a similar story in the 2015/2016 season as Lu only reached the UK Championship and Welsh Open, losing in the first round of both. He was relegated from the tour at the end of the season due to being ranked 101st in the world, well outside of the top 64.

=== 2018–19 season ===
Lu won his place on the snooker tour back for the 2018/19 season at the second event of 2018 Q School, losing only 7 frames in six matches. He stated that he felt 'mentally ready' to resurrect his professional career after two years playing only on the Chinese tour.

He reached his first last 16 in the Northern Ireland Open, beating Craig Steadman, Alan McManus and Hammad Miah, before losing to David Gilbert. He repeated the feat in next tournament, the UK Championship, where he beat Anthony McGill, Mark Joyce and Luca Brecel, before losing 6–5 to Tom Ford despite missing several chances to win.

In February, Lu reached his first ranking quarter-final at the Indian Open, beating Robert Milkins, Liam Highfield, Yan Bingtao and Stuart Bingham, before losing to eventual champion Matt Selt. The win against Bingham featured an amazing final frame clearance including a fluked blue and a fortunate kiss on the black.

In the following tournament, the Gibraltar Open, Lu went one better, beating three amateurs and professionals Shaun Murphy and Tian Pengfei before losing to defending champion Ryan Day. This semi-final lifted him inside the top 50 on the one-year ranking list.

== Performance and rankings timeline ==
Tournament	2011/ 12	2012/ 13	2013/ 14	2014/ 15	2015/ 16	2016/ 17	2017/ 18	2018/ 19	2019/ 20	2020/ 21	2021/ 22	2022/ 23
Ranking (Note: It shows the ranking at the beginning of the season)	(Note: He was an amateur)			(Note: New players on the Main Tour don't have a ranking)	114				65	51	35	34
Ranking tournaments
Championship League	Non-Ranking Event									RR	WD	F
European Masters	Tournament Not Held					A	A	LQ	1R	1R	LQ	LQ
British Open	Tournament Not Held										QF	2R
Northern Ireland Open	Tournament Not Held					A	A	4R	1R	2R	2R	1R
UK Championship	A	A	A	1R	1R	A	A	4R	2R	SF	1R	LQ
Scottish Open	NH	MR	Tournament Not Held			A	A	3R	3R	3R	LQ	LQ
English Open	Tournament Not Held					A	A	1R	2R	2R	2R	WD
World Grand Prix	Tournament Not Held			NR	DNQ	DNQ	DNQ	DNQ	DNQ	2R	DNQ	WD (Note: Lu was initially eligible to enter the World Grand Prix as he was in the Top 32 of the one-year ranking list at the cut-off point. However, he was suspended by the WPBSA before the cut-off point and thus he was withdrawn from participating in the tournament.)
Shoot Out	Non-Ranking Event					A	A	1R	2R	A	1R	A
German Masters	A	A	A	LQ	LQ	A	A	LQ	LQ	LQ	LQ	LQ
Welsh Open	A	A	A	1R	1R	A	A	1R	1R	1R	1R	A
Players Championship (Note: The event was called the Players Tour Championship Grand Finals (2011/2012–2012/2013))	A	DNQ	DNQ	DNQ	DNQ	DNQ	DNQ	DNQ	DNQ	1R	DNQ	DNQ
WST Classic	Tournament Not Held											A
Tour Championship	Tournament Not Held							DNQ	DNQ	DNQ	DNQ	DNQ
World Championship	A	A	A	LQ	LQ	A	A	LQ	LQ	LQ	LQ	A
Non-ranking tournaments
Championship League	A	A	A	A	A	A	A	A	A	A	RR	A
Former ranking tournaments
Wuxi Classic	NR	WR	1R	LQ	Tournament Not Held							
Australian Goldfields Open	A	A	A	LQ	LQ	Tournament Not Held						
Shanghai Masters	A	WR	WR	LQ	LQ	A	A	Non-Ranking		Tournament Not Held		
Paul Hunter Classic	Minor-Ranking Event					A	A	3R	NR	Tournament Not Held		
Indian Open	Not Held		A	LQ	NH	A	A	QF	Tournament Not Held			
China Open	2R	WR	A	LQ	LQ	A	A	3R	Tournament Not Held			
Riga Masters (Note: The event was called the Riga Open (2014/2015–2015/2016))	Tournament Not Held			Minor-Ranking		A	A	LQ	1R	Tournament Not Held		
International Championship	NH	1R	A	LQ	LQ	A	A	LQ	LQ	Tournament Not Held		
China Championship	Tournament Not Held					NR	A	LQ	1R	Tournament Not Held		
World Open (Note: The event was called the Haikou World Open (2011/2012–2013/2014))	1R	WR	A	Not Held		A	A	LQ	1R	Tournament Not Held		
WST Pro Series	Tournament Not Held									2R	Not Held	
Turkish Masters	Tournament Not Held										3R	NH
Gibraltar Open	Tournament Not Held				MR	A	A	SF	3R	QF	2R	NH
Non-ranking tournaments
Haining Open	Tournament Not Held			Minor-Ranking		3R	2R	A	4R	NH	A	NH

Performance Table Legend
LQ	lost in the qualifying draw	#R	lost in the early rounds of the tournament (WR = Wildcard round, RR = Round robin)	QF	lost in the quarter-finals
SF	lost in the semi-finals	F	lost in the final	W	won the tournament
DNQ	did not qualify for the tournament	A	did not participate in the tournament	#R	withdrew from the tournament

NH / Not Held	means an event was not held.
NR / Non-Ranking Event	means an event is/was no longer a ranking event.
R / Ranking Event	means an event is/was a ranking event.
MR / Minor-Ranking Event	means an event is/was a minor-ranking event.

== Career finals ==
=== Ranking finals: 1 ===
Outcome	No.	Year	Championship	Opponent in the final	Score
Runner-up	1.	2022	Championship League	(Belgium) Luca Brecel	1–3

=== Amateur finals: 1 (1 title) ===
Outcome	No.	Year	Championship	Opponent in the final	Score
Winner	1.	2013	IBSF World Under-21 Snooker Championship	(China) Zhou Yuelong	9–4
