= Luo Honghao =

Chinese snooker player

Personal information
- Nickname: The Virtuoso
- Born: 31 January 2000 (age 26) Nanchang, Jiangxi, China

Sport
- Country: China
- Sport: Snooker
- Professional: 2018–2021
- Highest ranking: 60 (September 2020)
- Best ranking finish: Quarter-final (x2)

Luo Honghao (Chinese: 罗弘昊; pinyin: Luó Hónghào; born 31 January 2000) is a Chinese former professional snooker player.

== Career ==
=== Amateur ===
In July 2017, he reached the final of 2017 IBSF World Under-21 Snooker Championship where he lost the final 7–6 to Fan Zhengyi.

Later in March 2018, he won the 2018 WSF Championship following a 6–0 demolition of Adam Stefanów in the final in Malta. This victory earned him a two-year World Snooker Tour card for the 2018–19 and 2019–2020 seasons.

Luo reached the third round of the 2018 China Open aged just 18 years old. He received an invitation to compete in 2018 World Snooker Championship qualifying round as an amateur, but he could not obtain the visa on-time.

=== Professional ===
In the 2018/19 season, Luo reached the quarter final of the 2018 English Open, before being defeated 5–3 by Ronnie O'Sullivan. At the final event of the season, Luo defeated Marco Fu 10–7, Robbie Williams 10-8 and Tom Ford 10–8 to reach the main stage of the 2019 World Snooker Championship held at the Crucible Theatre in Sheffield. However, in his first-round match against Shaun Murphy, he became only the second player to suffer a whitewash at the World Snooker Championship at the Crucible, losing 10-0 and setting a record for fewest points in a match at the Crucible with 89.

== Personal life ==
Luo is a highly accomplished pianist but chose snooker as a career aged 11.

== Performance and rankings timeline ==
Tournament	2013/ 14	2014/ 15	2015/ 16	2016/ 17	2017/ 18	2018/ 19	2019/ 20	2020/ 21
Ranking (Note: It shows the ranking at the beginning of the season.)	(Note: He was an amateur.)					(Note: New players on the Main Tour don't have a ranking.)	70	61
Ranking tournaments
European Masters	Tournament Not Held			A	A	1R	LQ	1R
English Open	Tournament Not Held			A	A	QF	1R	2R
Championship League	Non-Ranking Event							2R
Northern Ireland Open	Tournament Not Held			A	A	2R	2R	1R
UK Championship	A	A	A	A	A	2R	1R	1R
Scottish Open	Tournament Not Held			A	A	1R	1R	1R
World Grand Prix	NH	NR	DNQ	DNQ	DNQ	DNQ	DNQ	DNQ
German Masters	A	A	A	A	A	LQ	LQ	LQ
Shoot-Out	A	A	A	A	A	1R	3R	1R
Welsh Open	A	A	A	A	A	1R	1R	1R
Players Championship	DNQ	DNQ	DNQ	DNQ	DNQ	DNQ	DNQ	DNQ
Gibraltar Open	Not Held		MR	A	A	1R	1R	1R
WST Pro Series	Tournament Not Held							2R
Tour Championship	Tournament Not Held					DNQ	DNQ	DNQ
World Championship	A	A	A	A	WD	1R	LQ	LQ
Former ranking tournaments
Indian Open	A	A	NH	A	A	LQ	Not Held	
China Open	A	A	A	WR	3R	LQ	Not Held	
Riga Masters	NH	Minor-Rank.		A	A	LQ	QF	NH
International Championship	A	A	A	A	A	1R	LQ	NH
China Championship	Tournament Not Held			NR	LQ	1R	2R	NH
World Open	A	A	A	A	LQ	LQ	1R	NH
Former non-ranking tournaments
Six-red World Championship	A	A	A	A	A	RR	A	NH
Haining Open	NH	Minor-Rank.		3R	3R	A	QF	NH

Performance Table Legend
LQ	lost in the qualifying draw	#R	lost in the early rounds of the tournament (WR = Wildcard round, RR = Round robin)	QF	lost in the quarter-finals
SF	lost in the semi-finals	F	lost in the final	W	won the tournament
DNQ	did not qualify for the tournament	A	did not participate in the tournament	WD	withdrew from the tournament

NH / Not Held	means an event was not held.
NR / Non-Ranking Event	means an event is/was no longer a ranking event.
R / Ranking Event	means an event is/was a ranking event.
MR / Minor-Ranking Event	means an event is/was a minor-ranking event.

== Career finals ==
=== Amateur finals: 2 (1 title) ===
Outcome	No.	Year	Championship	Opponent in the final	Score
Runner-up	1.	2017	World Under-21 Snooker Championship	(China) Fan Zhengyi	6–7
Winner	1.	2018	WSF Championship	(Poland) Adam Stefanow	6–0
