= Chang Bingyu =

Chinese snooker player (born 2002)

Personal information
- Born: 8 August 2002 (age 24) Golmud, Qinghai, China

Sport
- Country: China
- Sport: Snooker
- Professional: 2019–2023, 2025–present
- Highest ranking: 16 (7 November 2026)
- Current ranking: 16 (as of 7 November 2026)
- Maximum breaks: 3
- Century breaks: 113 (as of 17 November 2026)

Tournament wins
- Ranking: 1

Chang Bingyu (Chinese: 常冰玉; born 8 August 2002) is a Chinese professional snooker player.

In December 2022, Chang was suspended from the professional tour amid a match-fixing investigation. In January 2023, the WPBSA charged him with fixing a match. After a hearing at an independent tribunal, Chang was banned from professional competition for two years, until 7 December 2024. Returning from the ban, he won the Asia-Pacific Snooker Championship 2025, which qualified him for a place on the professional World Snooker Tour for the following two seasons (2025/26 and 2026/27).

== Career ==
=== Early career ===
Chang Bingyu was born in Golmud, Qinghai on 8 August 2002. In December 2009, his family settled in Urumqi, Xinjiang. He first started to play snooker aged 6. At the age of 10, he had his first maximum 147 break in practice. His father, Chang Xudong, sold the family house and quit his job as an engineer to help his son's career, and the pair practiced together. They moved to Guangdong, and Chang worked with British-born coach Roger Leighton at the Wiraka Academy.

His first tournament 147 was in Guangzhou, aged 14. He also won a Junior tournament in Guangzhou, beating Duan Yanfeng 5–1. After victories at U14 and U16 level in Xi'an and Taishan, Chang concentrated on U18 and U21 tournaments. In 2017, Chang won the China Youth Championship in Yangzhou, beating He Guoqiang 4–0.

Later that year, Chang had his first significant result in a senior event on the Chinese tour. By beating Mei Xiwen, Ju Reti and Chen Feilong, he reached the final of the Baoying Open, losing 5–4 to Cao Yupeng after recovering from 4-1 behind.

In 2018, Chang won the IBSF World Snooker Championship, a leading amateur event. He beat He Guoqiang 8–3 in the final. He later received wildcard invitations to the World Open (where he beat Jimmy Robertson), the Shanghai Masters, the China Championship (beating Robertson and Robert Milkins), the International Championship and the China Open (where he beat Mark Davis).

In 2019 Chang had finished at the top of the China amateur rankings, thus qualifying for the World Snooker tour for the 2019–20 and 2020–21 seasons. He moved to England with his father, where he was at first based at the Q House Academy in Darlington, and then later at the Victoria Snooker Academy in Sheffield.

=== 2019/20 season ===
Chang's first match as a professional was a 4–2 win over Ian Burns in a Riga Masters qualifier. A visa issue meant that he was unable to travel to Riga to participate in the main event.

With the outbreak of COVID-19, the season was suspended, and Chang returned to China. He decided not to return when the season resumed, and missed the 2020 World Snooker Championship. He finished the season ranked 103.

=== 2020/21 season ===
Chang reached the third round of the UK Championship, beating Sam Craigie and Mark Allen before narrowly losing to Zhou Yuelong 6–5. In the World Championship he beat Julien Leclercq and Tom Ford before losing a 'Judgement Day' encounter with Lyu Haotian 10–6, a match which contained five century breaks.

Chang finished the season ranked 69, but his position on the 1-year list meant he qualified for a new 2-year tour card. After the season, rather than returning to China, Chang chose to stay in Sheffield to work on his game.

=== 2025/26 season ===
In April 2025, he defeated Ryan Thomerson to win the 2025 Asia-Pacific Snooker Championship and earn a two-year card for the World Snooker Tour, starting with the 2025-26 snooker season. He made his professional return in June 2025 in the first round of qualifying for the 2025 Wuhan Open, defeating Daniel Wells 5-4, having mounted a comeback from 4-1 down. In December, he reached the final of the 2025 Scottish Open but was defeated 2‍–‍9 by Chris Wakelin.

In February 2026 in the first round of the 2026 Welsh Open, Chang whitewashed Shaun Murphy 4–0, and scored four consecutive century breaks (130, 136, 119, 130). Three of his breaks were total clearances, with the third frame a 14 red clearance after Murphy potted his lone red. Chang became the ninth player to score four consecutive centuries. Chang then was beaten in the second round of the Welsh Open in a deciding frame by Jackson Page.

Having hit a 147 maximum in qualifying for the UK Championship, he hit a second in the season in the penultimate qualifying round of the 2026 World Championship, when facing Luca Brecel.

=== 2026/27 season ===
During the qualifying round for the 2026 Shenzhen Open, Chang made his third competitive maximum break in the fourth frame against Chatchapong Nasa: the match featured four century breaks (including the maximum) and an 83.

Chang won his first ranking title at the Wuhan Open: it was his second final, having reached his maiden ranking final at the 2025 Scottish Open which he had lost. He defeated Zhao Xintong 10–7 to claim the Wuhan Open title. The victory earned him a winners' cheque of £175,000 and brought an end to Zhao's unbeaten record in tournament finals.

== Personal life ==
When in the UK, Chang Bingyu lives in Sheffield and practices at the Ding Junhui Snooker Academy.

== Performance and rankings timeline ==
Tournament	2016/ 17	2017/ 18	2018/ 19	2019/ 20	2020/ 21	2021/ 22	2022/ 23	2025/ 26	2026/ 27
Ranking (Note: It shows the ranking at the beginning of the season)	(Note: He was an amateur)			(Note: New players on the Main Tour don't have a ranking)	78	(Note: Players qualified One Year Ranking List started the season without ranking points)	81		48
Ranking tournaments
Championship League	Non-Ranking Event				RR	2R	2R	RR	2R
China Open	A	LQ	1R	Tournament Not Held					1R
Wuhan Open	Tournament Not Held							2R	W
British Open	Tournament Not Held					1R	2R	3R	2R
English Open	A	A	A	1R	2R	1R	WD	LQ	2R
Shenzhen Open (Note: The event was called the Xi'an Grand Prix (2024/2025–2025/2026))	Tournament Not Held							LQ	LQ
Northern Ireland Open	A	A	A	1R	1R	LQ	LQ	1R	1R
International Championship	A	A	LQ	1R	Not Held			LQ	SF
UK Championship	A	A	A	1R	3R	1R	LQ	LQ	
Shoot Out	A	A	A	2R	WD	1R	WD	2R	
Scottish Open	A	A	A	2R	2R	1R	WD	F	
German Masters	A	A	A	LQ	LQ	LQ	LQ	WD	
Welsh Open	A	A	A	1R	1R	LQ	WD	2R	
World Grand Prix	Did Not Qualify							2R	
Players Championship	Did Not Qualify								
World Open	A	A	1R	1R	Not Held			1R	
Tour Championship	Not Held		Did Not Qualify						
World Championship	A	A	A	A	LQ	LQ	A	LQ	
Non-ranking tournaments
Champion of Champions	A	A	A	A	A	A	A	A	QF
Former ranking tournaments
China Championship	NR	A	2R	LQ	Tournament Not Held				
WST Pro Series	Tournament Not Held				RR	Tournament Not Held			
Turkish Masters	Tournament Not Held					LQ	Not Held		
Gibraltar Open	A	A	A	2R	2R	WD	Not Held		
European Masters	A	A	A	LQ	1R	LQ	WD	Not Held	
Saudi Arabia Masters	Tournament Not Held							6R	NH
Former non-ranking tournaments
Haining Open	1R	2R	3R	QF	NH	A	A	Not Held	

Performance Table Legend
LQ	lost in the qualifying draw	#R	lost in the early rounds of the tournament (WR = Wildcard round, RR = Round robin)	QF	lost in the quarter-finals
SF	lost in the semi-finals	F	lost in the final	W	won the tournament
DNQ	did not qualify for the tournament	A	did not participate in the tournament	WD	withdrew from the tournament

NH / Not Held	means an event was not held.
NR / Non-Ranking Event	means an event is/was no longer a ranking event.
R / Ranking Event	means an event is/was a ranking event.
MR / Minor-Ranking Event	means an event is/was a minor-ranking event.

== Career finals ==
=== Ranking finals: 2 (1 title) ===
Outcome	No.	Year	Championship	Opponent in the final	Score
Runner-up	1.	2025	Scottish Open	(England) Chris Wakelin	2–9
Winner	1.	2026	Wuhan Open	(China) Zhao Xintong	10–7

=== Pro-am finals: 1 ===
Outcome	No.	Year	Championship	Opponent in the final	Score
Runner-up	1.	2017	Baoying Open	(China) Cao Yupeng	4–5

=== Amateur finals: 2 (2 titles) ===
Outcome	No.	Year	Championship	Opponent in the final	Score
Winner	1.	2018	IBSF World Snooker Championship	(China) He Guoqiang	8–3
Winner	2.	2025	Asia-Pacific Snooker Championship	(Australia) Ryan Thomerson	6–1
