= Aaron Hill (snooker player) =

Irish professional snooker player

Personal information
- Nickname: The Breeze
- Born: 28 February 2002 (age 24) Cork, County Cork, Ireland

Sport
- Country: Ireland
- Sport: Snooker
- Professional: 2020–present
- Highest ranking: 35 (7 November 2026)
- Current ranking: 35 (as of 7 November 2026)
- Maximum breaks: 2
- Best ranking finish: Quarter-final (x4)

Aaron Hill (born 28 February 2002) is an Irish professional snooker player.

== Career ==
In March 2020, Hill won the EBSA European Under-21 Snooker Championships, as a result, he was awarded a two-year card on the World Snooker Tour for the 2020–21 and 2021–22.

On 24 September 2020, Hill defeated the World Champion at that time Ronnie O'Sullivan 5–4 in the last 64 of the European Masters.

At the 2022 Northern Ireland Open, Hill defeated ranking world number 2 Judd Trump 4–1 to advance to the last 32.

In September 2025, Hill made the first maximum break of his career during his second-round match at the 2025 English Open against Yao Pengcheng. In October 2025, Hill made the second maximum break of his career during his 5–2 win over Huang Jiahao at the 2025 Xi'an Grand Prix, having made his first maximum break 23 days previously.

== Performance and rankings timeline ==
Tournament	2018/ 19	2019/ 20	2020/ 21	2021/ 22	2022/ 23	2023/ 24	2024/ 25	2025/ 26	2026/ 27
Ranking (Note: It shows the ranking at the beginning of the season)	(Note: He was an amateur)		(Note: New players don't have a ranking)	79	(Note: Players qualified through Q School started the season without ranking points)	73	60	50	41
Ranking tournaments
Championship League	NR		RR	RR	2R	RR	RR	RR	RR
China Open	NH	Tournament Not Held							1R
Wuhan Open	Tournament Not Held					QF	1R	3R	LQ
British Open	Not Held			1R	LQ	LQ	1R	LQ	QF
English Open	A	A	1R	LQ	LQ	LQ	1R	QF	1R
Shenzhen Open (Note: The event was called the Xi'an Grand Prix (2024/2025–2025/2026))	Tournament Not Held						1R	3R	LQ
Northern Ireland Open	A	A	1R	LQ	2R	3R	LQ	3R	1R
International Championship	A	A	Not Held			LQ	1R	2R	3R
UK Championship	A	A	1R	1R	LQ	LQ	LQ	LQ	
Shoot Out	A	3R	1R	3R	1R	1R	3R	2R	
Scottish Open	A	A	1R	LQ	LQ	2R	LQ	LQ	
German Masters	A	A	LQ	LQ	LQ	1R	QF	LQ	LQ
Welsh Open	A	A	2R	LQ	2R	2R	LQ	1R	
World Grand Prix	DNQ	DNQ	DNQ	DNQ	DNQ	DNQ	DNQ	1R	
Players Championship	DNQ	DNQ	DNQ	DNQ	DNQ	DNQ	DNQ	DNQ	
World Open	A	A	Not Held			1R	2R	1R	
Tour Championship	DNQ	DNQ	DNQ	DNQ	DNQ	DNQ	DNQ	DNQ	
World Championship	LQ	LQ	LQ	LQ	LQ	LQ	LQ	LQ	
Former ranking tournaments
WST Pro Series	Not Held		WD	Tournament Not Held					
Turkish Masters	Not Held			1R	Tournament Not Held				
Gibraltar Open	A	A	2R	3R	Tournament Not Held				
WST Classic	Tournament Not Held				1R	Tournament Not Held			
European Masters	A	A	4R	1R	1R	1R	Not Held		
Saudi Arabia Masters	Tournament Not Held						2R	4R	NH
Former non-ranking tournaments
Six-red World Championship	A	A	Not Held		LQ	Tournament Not Held			

Performance Table Legend
LQ	lost in the qualifying draw	#R	lost in the early rounds of the tournament (WR = Wildcard round, RR = Round robin)	QF	lost in the quarter-finals
SF	lost in the semi-finals	F	lost in the final	W	won the tournament
DNQ	did not qualify for the tournament	A	did not participate in the tournament	WD	withdrew from the tournament

NH / Not Held	means an event was not held.
NR / Non-Ranking Event	means an event is/was no longer a ranking event.
R / Ranking Event	means an event is/was a ranking event.
MR / Minor-Ranking Event	means an event is/was a minor-ranking event.

== Career finals ==
=== Amateur finals: 5 (3 titles) ===
Outcome	No.	Year	Championship	Opponent in the final	Score	Ref.
Runner-up	1.	2018	World Open Under-16 Snooker Championships	(Belgium) Ben Mertens	3–4	
Winner	1.	2019	EBSA European Under-18 Snooker Championships	(Wales) Dylan Emery	4–3	
Runner-up	2.	2019	Challenge Tour - Event 4	(England) Ashley Hugill	1–3	
Winner	2.	2020	EBSA European Under-18 Snooker Championships (2)	(England) Sean Maddocks	4–1	
Winner	3.	2020	EBSA European Under-21 Snooker Championships	(England) Hayden Staniland	5–2	
