= World Snooker Federation =

- Sport: Snooker (amateur)
- Jurisdiction: International
- Abbreviation: WSF
- Founded: 2017

Official website
- worldsnookerfederation.org

The World Snooker Federation (WSF) is an international governing body responsible for the development and promotion of snooker worldwide and was founded in 2017 in Lausanne.

== Overview ==
It works in collaboration with the WPBSA and World Snooker Tour (WST) and serves as a bridge between amateur and professional snooker. The WSF organizes international amateur tournaments, iThe WSF Championships include qualification events that offer places on the World Snooker Tour (WST). It also supports national federations in developing snooker and promoting standardized competition worldwide.

== Competitions ==
- WSF Championship
  - WSF Junior Championship
  - WSF Seniors Championship
