= 2020 Players Championship (snooker) =

Snooker tournament

2020 Coral Players Championship

Tournament information
- Dates: 24 February – 1 March 2020
- Venue: Southport Theatre
- City: Southport
- Country: England
- Organisation: World Snooker Tour
- Format: Ranking event
- Total prize fund: £385,000
- Winner's share: £125,000
- Highest break: Neil Robertson (AUS) (140)

Final
- Champion: Judd Trump (ENG)
- Runner-up: Yan Bingtao (CHN)
- Score: 10–4

The 2020 Players Championship (officially the 2020 Coral Players Championship) was a professional snooker tournament that took place from 24 February to 1 March 2020 at the Southport Theatre in Southport, England. It was the 14th ranking event of the 2019–20 snooker season and the second leg of the Coral Series. The tenth edition of the Players Championship, first held in 2011, the event was sponsored by sports betting company Coral, and broadcast on ITV4 in the United Kingdom, and Eurosport across Europe. The event featured 16 participants chosen from players who were the highest earners from the prior 13 ranking tournaments.

Ronnie O'Sullivan was the defending champion after beating Neil Robertson 10–4 in the 2019 final, but he failed to qualify for the 2020 event, being 18th in the rankings before the tournament began. The event was won by Judd Trump who defeated Yan Bingtao 10–4 in the final. It was the 16th ranking title of Trump's career, and his fifth ranking event win of the season. With it, he equalled the record held jointly by Stephen Hendry, Ding Junhui, Mark Selby and O'Sullivan for the most ranking titles in a single season. There was a total of 18 century breaks made during the tournament, the highest of which was a 140 made by Neil Robertson in the second frame of his first round loss to Joe Perry.

== Format ==
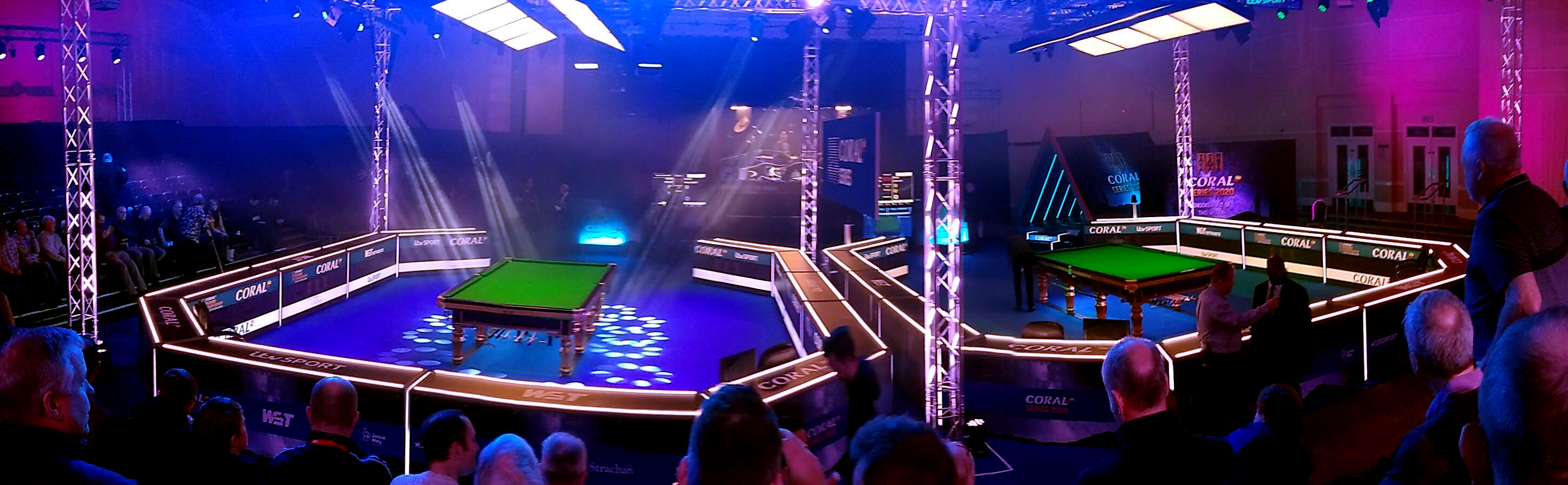
Interior of the Southport Theatre and Convention Centre on the first day of the tournament

The 2020 Players Championship was a professional snooker tournament held from 24 February to 1 March 2020 at the Southport Theatre and Convention Centre in Southport, England. The event had 16 participants, chosen from players with the most ranking points in the 2019–20 snooker season at the beginning of the tournament. To qualify for the event, players were chosen from points earned in the preceding 12 ranking tournaments, rather than by world rankings. Points scored at events from the 2019 Riga Masters until the 2020 Snooker Shoot Out were added towards qualifying for the tournament. The Players Championship was the second of three events in the Coral Cup, following the 2020 World Grand Prix and preceding the Tour Championship. It was the 14th ranking event of the snooker season, following the Snooker Shoot Out and preceding the 2020 Gibraltar Open. The event was sponsored by sports betting company Coral.

=== Qualification ===
Qualification for the event was conducted on the basis of the one-year ranking list up to and including the 2020 Snooker Shoot Out.

Rank	Player	Total points
1	Judd Trump (ENG)	531,500
2	Shaun Murphy (ENG)	353,000
3	Neil Robertson (AUS)	274,500
4	Mark Selby (ENG)	267,500
5	Ding Junhui (CHN)	261,250
6	Yan Bingtao (CHN)	156,500
7	Mark Allen (NIR)	150,500
8	John Higgins (SCO)	143,500
9	Graeme Dott (SCO)	136,250
10	Thepchaiya Un-Nooh (THA)	131,000
11	Kyren Wilson (ENG)	130,000
12	Stephen Maguire (SCO)	122,000
13	Mark Williams (WAL)	113,250
14	Joe Perry (ENG)	112,000
15	David Gilbert (ENG)	104,000
16	Michael Holt (ENG)	102,000

=== Prize fund ===
The event had a total prize fund of £385,000, with £125,000 awarded to the winner. The participation prize was £10,000, which did not count towards a player's world ranking. The breakdown of prize money for the 2020 tournament is shown below:

- Winner: £125,000
- Runner-up: £50,000
- Semi-final: £30,000
- Quarter-final: £15,000
- Last 16: £10,000 (Prize money at this stage did not count towards prize money rankings)
- Highest break: £10,000
- Total: £385,000

== Summary ==
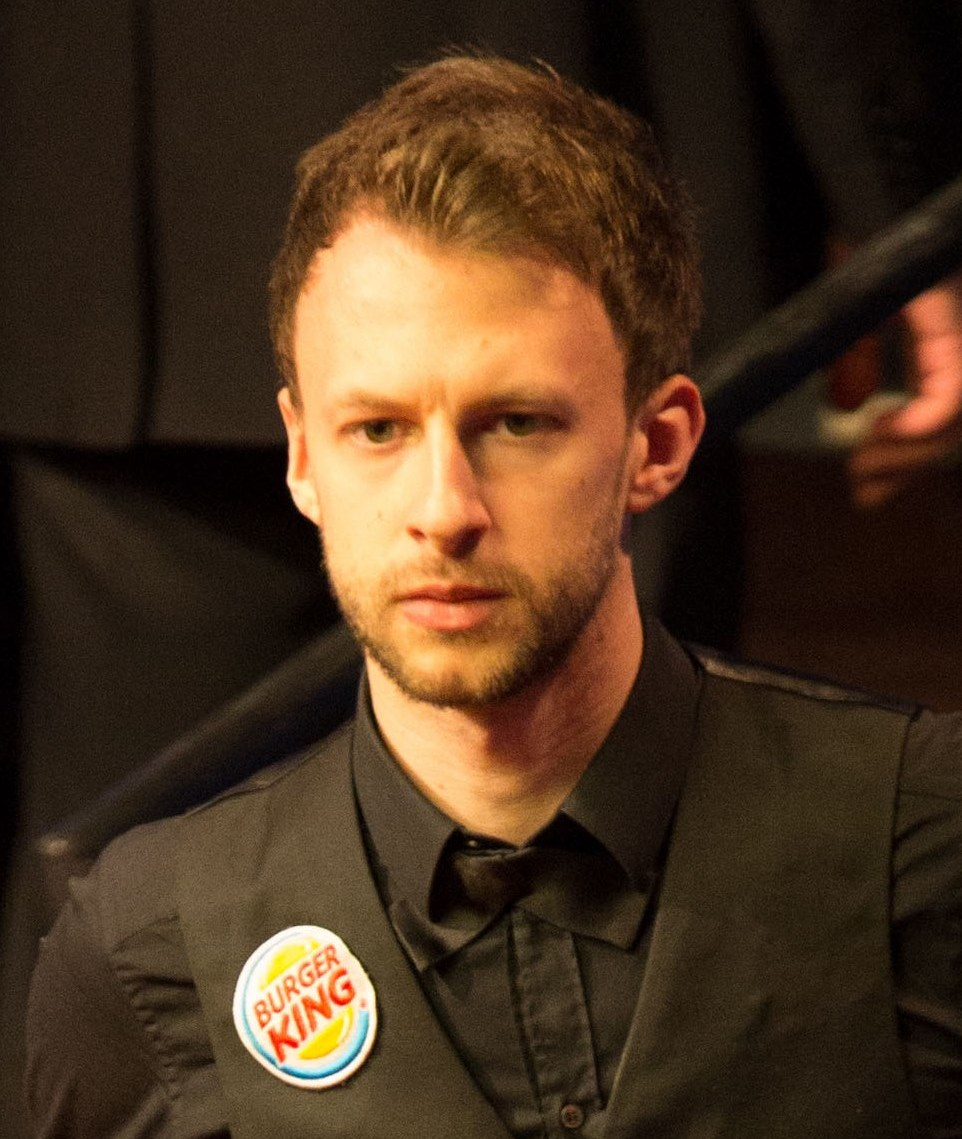
Judd Trump won the event, his fifth championship of the season

The first round was played between 24 and 26 February. Two three-time World Snooker Championship winners met in the opening match, with Mark Selby completing a whitewash 6–0 win over Mark Williams. Selby considered his play to be "faultless". Stephen Maguire defeated Ding Junhui on a deciding frame 6–5. Both John Higgins and Yan Bingtao won their opening round matches 6–2, over Graeme Dott and Kyren Wilson, respectively. World number one Judd Trump overcame Shoot Out champion Michael Holt 6–3, the same score-line that Mark Allen defeated Thepchaiya Un-Nooh. Third seed Neil Robertson lost 4–6 to Joe Perry, having trailed in the match 1–5. The final first round match was played between Shaun Murphy and David Gilbert. Murphy, who led 4–1, was pegged back to 5-5 and made a break of 49 to win the decider.

The quarter-finals were played from 26 toF 28 February. Trump defeated Higgins 6–3, with Higgins making the only century break, a 123 in frame five. Maguire led 4–1 over Selby but the match went to a deciding frame at 5–5. Maguire won the match in frame 11, his second 6–5 victory of the tournament. Yan Bingtao and Joe Perry also went to a deciding frame, with Yan leading 5–2, and Perry winning three successive frames to tie the match. Yan won the match on the final black ball in frame 11. The last quarter-final was played between second seed Murphy and seventh seed Allen. Murphy won the opening two frames, before Allen won the next two, but Murphy won three straight frames to win 6–2. Allen admitted that he had been suffering from conjunctivitis during the tournament, and "if it was any other tournament [he] would have had to pull out".

The semi-finals were played on 29 February. Trump led Maguire 3–1, but Magurire won the next four frame. Trailing 3–5, Trump won two frames to force a deciding frame, and made a break of 70 to win the match 6–5. Trump commented: "For a deciding frame that was probably the best clearance I’ve ever made." Yan won the first three frames of his match against Murphy, making a break of 104 in frame 2. Murphy won frame four, but lost the remaining frames to lose 1–6. Murphy commented that he "had a bad night", but commended Yan's attitude after his defeat at the Welsh Open semi-final.

The final was played as the best-of-19 frames held over two sessions on 1 March 2020. Yan Bingtao played reigning world champion Judd Trump. Trump won the opening frame, before Yangtao won the second with breaks of 70 and 55. Trump then won the next four frames with four breaks over 50. The final frame of the first session was won by Yan, as he made a break of 95 to trail 2–5. Yan also won two of the next three frames, before Trump made breaks of 108, and 68 to lead 8–4 into the mid-session interval. Trump won the two following frames to clinch victory in the match 10–4, his sixteenth ranking event title and his fifth ranking event win of the season. In winning the tournament, he equalled the record held jointly by Stephen Hendry, Ding Junhui, Selby and O'Sullivan for the most ranking titles in a single season. After the match, Trump commented that he was "proud" of the achievement, and that it had been "an amazing two years" for him.

== Tournament draw ==
Last 16; Best of 11 frames
1	Judd Trump (ENG)	6
16	Michael Holt (ENG)	3
8	John Higgins (SCO)	6
9	Graeme Dott (SCO)	2
5	Ding Junhui (CHN)	5
12	Stephen Maguire (SCO)	6
4	Mark Selby (ENG)	6
13	Mark Williams (WAL)	0
3	Neil Robertson (AUS)	4
14	Joe Perry (ENG)	6
6	Yan Bingtao (CHN)	6
11	Kyren Wilson (ENG)	2
7	Mark Allen (NIR)	6
10	Thepchaiya Un-Nooh (THA)	3
2	Shaun Murphy (ENG)	6
15	David Gilbert (ENG)	5

Quarter-finals; Best of 11 frames
1	(England) Judd Trump	6
8	(Scotland) John Higgins	3
12	(Scotland) Stephen Maguire	6
4	(England) Mark Selby	5
14	(England) Joe Perry	5
6	(China) Yan Bingtao	6
7	(Northern Ireland) Mark Allen	2
2	(England) Shaun Murphy	6

Semi-finals; Best of 11 frames
1	(England) Judd Trump	6
12	(Scotland) Stephen Maguire	5
6	(China) Yan Bingtao	6
2	(England) Shaun Murphy	1

Final; Best of 19 frames
1	(England) Judd Trump	10
6	(China) Yan Bingtao	4

=== Final ===
Final: Best of 19 frames. Referee: Desislava Bozhilova; Waterfront, Southport, England, 1 March 2020
Judd Trump (1); England	10–4	Yan Bingtao (6); China
Afternoon: 76–74, 6–86, 75–0, 62–31, 122–0 (122), 76–8, 75–0, 27–101; Evening: 0–85, 19–69, 109–9 (108), 72–0, 88–36, 97–16
122	Highest break	95
2	Century breaks	0

== Century breaks ==
There was a total of 18 century breaks made during the tournament, the highest of which was a 140 made by Neil Robertson in the second frame of his first round win over Joe Perry.

- 140, 127, 119 – Neil Robertson
- 132, 130, 122, 108 – Judd Trump
- 132, 129, 123 – Mark Allen
- 128 – Michael Holt
- 123 – John Higgins
- 122 – David Gilbert
- 106, 104, 100 – Yan Bingtao
- 103 – Mark Selby
- 103 – Shaun Murphy
