= 2020 World Grand Prix (2019–20 season) =

Snooker tournament held in February 2020

2020 Coral World Grand Prix

Tournament information
- Dates: 3–9 February 2020
- Venue: The Centaur
- City: Cheltenham
- Country: England
- Organisation: World Snooker Tour
- Format: Ranking event
- Total prize fund: £380,000
- Winner's share: £100,000
- Highest break: Neil Robertson (AUS) (142)

Final
- Champion: Neil Robertson (AUS)
- Runner-up: Graeme Dott (SCO)
- Score: 10–8

The 2020 World Grand Prix (officially the 2020 Coral World Grand Prix) was a professional snooker tournament which took place from 3 to 9 February 2020 in the Centaur at Cheltenham Racecourse in Cheltenham, England. It was the eleventh ranking event of the 2019–20 snooker season, and the first of three Coral Cup tournaments. The 2020 edition of the World Grand Prix was sponsored by the betting company Coral. The event had 32 participants, with players qualifying by virtue of their ranking points during the 2019–20 season. It had a prize fund of £380,000, with £100,000 going to the winner.

The defending champion was Judd Trump, who had beaten Ali Carter 10–6 in the 2019 final. Trump was defeated, 3–4, in the second round by Kyren Wilson. Neil Robertson won the tournament for the first time (his 18th ranking title) with a 10–8 victory against Graeme Dott in the final. It was the third consecutive final in the season for Robertson, who lost just one match in the event. It had 32 century breaks, with the highest a 142 by Robertson in the final.

== Format ==
The 2020 World Grand Prix was a professional snooker tournament held from 3 to 9 February 2020 in the Centaur at Cheltenham Racecourse, Cheltenham, England. It had 32 participants from players with the most ranking points in the 2019–20 snooker season at the beginning of the tournament. To qualify for the event, players were chosen from points earned in the preceding ten ranking tournaments, rather than by world rankings. Points scored at events from the 2019 Riga Masters until the 2020 German Masters added towards qualifying for the event. The World Grand Prix was the first of three events in the Coral Cup, with the Players Championship and Tour Championship. It was the eleventh ranking event of the snooker season, following the German Masters and preceding the Welsh Open.

=== Prize fund ===
The event had a total prize fund of £380,000, with £100,000 to the winner. The participation prize was £5,000, which did not count towards a player's world ranking. The breakdown of prize money for the event was:

- Winner: £100,000
- Runner-up: £40,000
- Semi-final: £20,000
- Quarter-final: £12,500
- Last 16: £7,500
- Last 32: £5,000 (Prize money at this stage did not count towards prize money rankings)
- Highest break: £10,000
- Total: £380,000

== Seeding list ==
Rank	Player	Total points
1	Judd Trump (ENG)	514,000
2	Shaun Murphy (ENG)	281,000
3	Mark Selby (ENG)	257,500
4	Ding Junhui (CHN)	253,750
5	Neil Robertson (AUS)	164,500
6	Mark Allen (NIR)	146,500
7	Thepchaiya Un-Nooh (THA)	130,500
8	Yan Bingtao (CHN)	128,500
9	John Higgins (SCO)	121,000
10	Stephen Maguire (SCO)	114,500
11	David Gilbert (ENG)	103,500
12	Mark Williams (WAL)	101,250
13	Joe Perry (ENG)	97,500
14	Graeme Dott (SCO)	96,250
15	Zhou Yuelong (CHN)	80,250
16	Kyren Wilson (ENG)	79,500
17	Jack Lisowski (ENG)	78,750
18	Gary Wilson (ENG)	75,500
19	Kurt Maflin (NOR)	71,500
20	Ali Carter (ENG)	68,500
21	Barry Hawkins (ENG)	65,250
22	Ronnie O'Sullivan (ENG)	64,500
23	Tom Ford (ENG)	60,250
24	Stuart Bingham (ENG)	58,500
25	Zhao Xintong (CHN)	58,250
26	Matthew Selt (ENG)	57,750
27	Liang Wenbo (CHN)	56,000
28	Michael Holt (ENG)	52,000
29	Scott Donaldson (SCO)	51,750
30	Xiao Guodong (CHN)	51,000
31	Matthew Stevens (WAL)	50,750
32	Li Hang (CHN)	50,500

== Summary ==
=== Early rounds ===
Scott Donaldson and Kurt Maflin made their debuts in the event. The first round of the tournament was played as best-of-seven-frames matches. Three-time world champion Mark Williams defeated Barry Hawkins 4–2, despite an attack of gout. The 2019 UK Championship winner Ding Junhui met Scott Donaldson (after competed at the previous two tournaments: the 2020 European Masters and the 2020 German Masters), with Donaldson winning both. Donaldson won the match, whitewashing Ding 4–0 and eliminating him at three straight events. Second seed and 2019 China Open champion Shaun Murphy lost to Matthew Stevens, 3–4.

Five-time world champion Ronnie O'Sullivan was ranked 22nd for the event, since he had missed some of the season's ranking events. He played David Gilbert, defeating him 4–3 on a deciding frame. Defending champion Judd Trump defeated Li Hang 4–1, which Sporting Life called a "demolition". Sixth-seeded Mark Allen lost to Liang Wenbo 2–4, and Thepchaiya Un-Nooh lost on a deciding frame to Matthew Selt. The 2020 European Masters champion Neil Robertson defeated Michael Holt 4–3, also on a deciding frame. Kyren Wilson, John Higgins, Joe Perry, Graeme Dott and Tom Ford were victorious in other matches.

World champion Judd Trump met 16th seed Kyren Wilson in the second round. Wilson led 3–1, before Trump won the next two frames to force a deciding frame. Wilson took the deciding frame to win 4–3. Ronnie O'Sullivan and Liang Wenbo also went to a deciding frame; O'Sullivan won 4–3, scoring back-to-back centuries in the first two frames. Gary Wilson defeated Matthew Stevens 4–1; Graeme Dott and Neil Robertson completed 4–0 whitewashes of Xiao Guodong and Mark Williams, respectively. Tom Ford defeated Matthew Selt, and Joe Perry defeated Scott Donaldson (both 4–2) in the other second-round matches.

=== Quarter- and semi-finals ===
The quarter-finals were played as best-of-9-frames matches. Kyren Wilson drew John Higgins who won the first two frames Wilson won the next two frames with breaks of 64 and 89 to tie the match, 2–2. The next four frames were shared, leading to a deciding frame. Wilson made two breaks, and Higgins needed snookers to win. Although Higgins drew two fouls, Wilson won the match after potting a long brown ball. Joe Perry won the first frame of his match with Neil Robertson with a break of 86 before Robertson won the next five frames to win, 5–1. Ronnie O'Sullivan won the opening frame against Graeme Dott, who then won the next three frames. O'Sullivan tied the match, 3–3, with a break of 102 in frame six. Dott won the next two frames for a 5–3 victory, with breaks of 52 and 91. It was Dott's first win against O'Sullivan in nine years. In the other quarter-final, Tom Ford defeated Gary Wilson 5–2. After the match, he said that his form had improved due to his "mind coach".

The semi-finals were played as best-of-11-frames matches. Neil Robertson won the first three frames of his match with Kyren Wilson with breaks of 80, 59 and 77. Wilson then won three of the next four, including a break of 129, to trail 3–4. Robertson led 5–4 before making a break of 68 to win, 6–4. The second semi-final was played by Graeme Dott and Tom Ford. Dott was playing in his second consecutive semi-final, after reaching that stage at the German Masters. Ford led 4–3 before Dott won three frames in a row with breaks of 81, 67 and 70 to win, 6–3.

=== Final ===
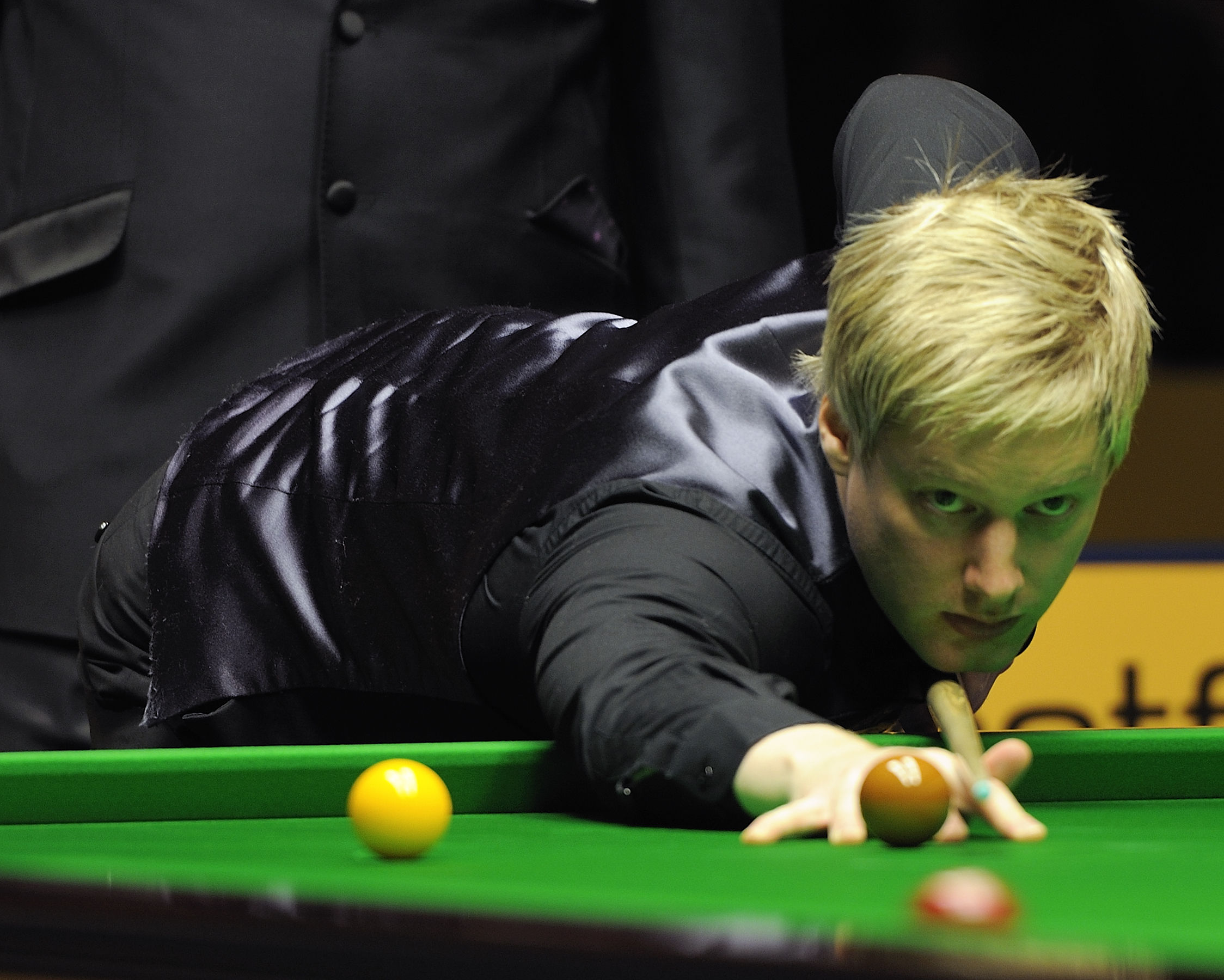
Neil Robertson (pictured in 2013) won the tournament, defeating Graeme Dott 10–8 in the final.

The final was played over two sessions as a best-of-19-frames match. Robertson was playing in his third straight ranking final, after he won the European Masters and was runner-up at the German Masters. Dott had not won an event since the 2007 China Open, and last reached a ranking final in 2018. This was a rematch of the 2010 World Snooker Championship final, which Robertson had won. The final was refereed by Leo Scullion. Robertson took the opening frame and made a break of 63 in the second, losing the frame by six points. Dott won frame three before Robertson won four frames in a row (including a break of 127) to lead, 5–2. Dott won the final frame of the opening session to trail, 3–5.

He then won two of the first three frames in the evening session to trail, 5–6. Dott scored only a single point across the next three frames, Robertson earning 313 taking all three frames. Dott won the next two frames to trail, 7–9; but required two snookers in frame 17 to be able to win. Dott secured the foul shots to trail 8–9, before Robertson won frame 18 to win the match, 10–8. After the match, he said that he had been a "bit twitchy" near the end. Dott called Robertson "a machine". Robertson made five century breaks during the final, including the tournament's highest break – a 142 – in frame 12.

== Tournament draw ==
The event featured five single elimination rounds featuring 32 players. Below is the bracket for the event. Players in bold denote match winners.

**Last 32**; Best of 7 frames
1	**Judd Trump (ENG)**	**4**
32	Li Hang (CHN)	1
16	**Kyren Wilson (ENG)**	**4**
17	Jack Lisowski (ENG)	3
9	**John Higgins (SCO)**	**4**
24	Stuart Bingham (ENG)	2
8	Yan Bingtao (CHN)	2
25	**Zhao Xintong (CHN)**	**4**
5	**Neil Robertson (AUS)**	**4**
28	Michael Holt (ENG)	3
12	**Mark Williams (WAL)**	**4**
21	Barry Hawkins (ENG)	2
13	**Joe Perry (ENG)**	**4**
20	Ali Carter (ENG)	2
4	Ding Junhui (CHN)	0
29	**Scott Donaldson (SCO)**	**4**
3	Mark Selby (ENG)	3
30	**Xiao Guodong (CHN)**	**4**
14	**Graeme Dott (SCO)**	**4**
19	Kurt Maflin (NOR)	1
11	David Gilbert (ENG)	3
22	**Ronnie O'Sullivan (ENG)**	**4**
6	Mark Allen (NIR)	2
27	**Liang Wenbo (CHN)**	**4**
7	Thepchaiya Un-Nooh (THA)	3
26	**Matthew Selt (ENG)**	**4**
10	Stephen Maguire (SCO)	3
23	**Tom Ford (ENG)**	**4**
15	Zhou Yuelong (CHN)	1
18	**Gary Wilson (ENG)**	**4**
2	Shaun Murphy (ENG)	3
31	**Matthew Stevens (WAL)**	**4**

**Last 16**; Best of 7 frames
1	(England) Judd Trump	3
16	(England) **Kyren Wilson**	**4**
9	(Scotland) **John Higgins**	**4**
25	(China) Zhao Xintong	1
5	(Australia) **Neil Robertson**	**4**
12	(Wales) Mark Williams	0
13	(England) **Joe Perry**	**4**
29	(Scotland) Scott Donaldson	2
30	(China) Xiao Guodong	0
14	(Scotland) **Graeme Dott**	**4**
22	(England) **Ronnie O'Sullivan**	**4**
27	(China) Liang Wenbo	3
26	(England) Matthew Selt	2
23	(England) **Tom Ford**	**4**
18	(England) **Gary Wilson**	**4**
31	(Wales) Matthew Stevens	1

**Quarter-finals**; Best of 9 frames
16	(England) **Kyren Wilson**	**5**
9	(Scotland) John Higgins	4
5	(Australia) **Neil Robertson**	**5**
13	(England) Joe Perry	1
14	(Scotland) **Graeme Dott**	**5**
22	(England) Ronnie O'Sullivan	3
23	(England) **Tom Ford**	**5**
18	(England) Gary Wilson	2

**Semi-finals**; Best of 11 frames
16	(England) Kyren Wilson	4
5	(Australia) **Neil Robertson**	**6**
14	(Scotland) **Graeme Dott**	**6**
23	(England) Tom Ford	4

**Final**; Best of 19 frames
5	(Australia) **Neil Robertson**	**10**
14	(Scotland) Graeme Dott	8

=== Final ===
Final: Best of 19 frames. Referee: Leo Scullion; The Centaur, Cheltenham Racecourse, Cheltenham, England, 9 February 2020
**Neil Robertson** (5); Australia	**10**–8	Graeme Dott (14); Scotland
Afternoon: **70**–9, 67–**69**, 1–**102**, **127**–0 (127), **68**–22, **110**–0 (110), **63**–21, 41–**58**; Evening: 32–**101**, **138**–0 (107), 8–**88**, **142**–0 (142), **70**–1, **101**–0 (101), 43–**66**, 37–**65**, 73–**77**, **70**–17
**142**	Highest break	88
**5**	Century breaks	0

== Century breaks ==
A total of 33 century breaks were made at the tournament. The highest was a 142, made by Neil Robertson in frame 13 of the final.

- 142, 140, 127, 110, 107, 105, 101, 100, 100 – Neil Robertson
- 138, 100, 100 – Judd Trump
- 134 – Matthew Selt
- 132, 129, 120, 102, 100 – Ronnie O'Sullivan
- 131, 111 – Mark Selby
- 130 – Mark Allen
- 129 – Li Hang
- 129 – Kyren Wilson
- 122 – Michael Holt
- 120, 114 – Scott Donaldson
- 115 – David Gilbert
- 107 – Thepchaiya Un-Nooh
- 106 – Joe Perry
- 105 – Liang Wenbo
- 103 – Graeme Dott
- 103 – Zhao Xintong
- 101 – Xiao Guodong
