= Yan Bingtao =

Chinese snooker player (born 2000)

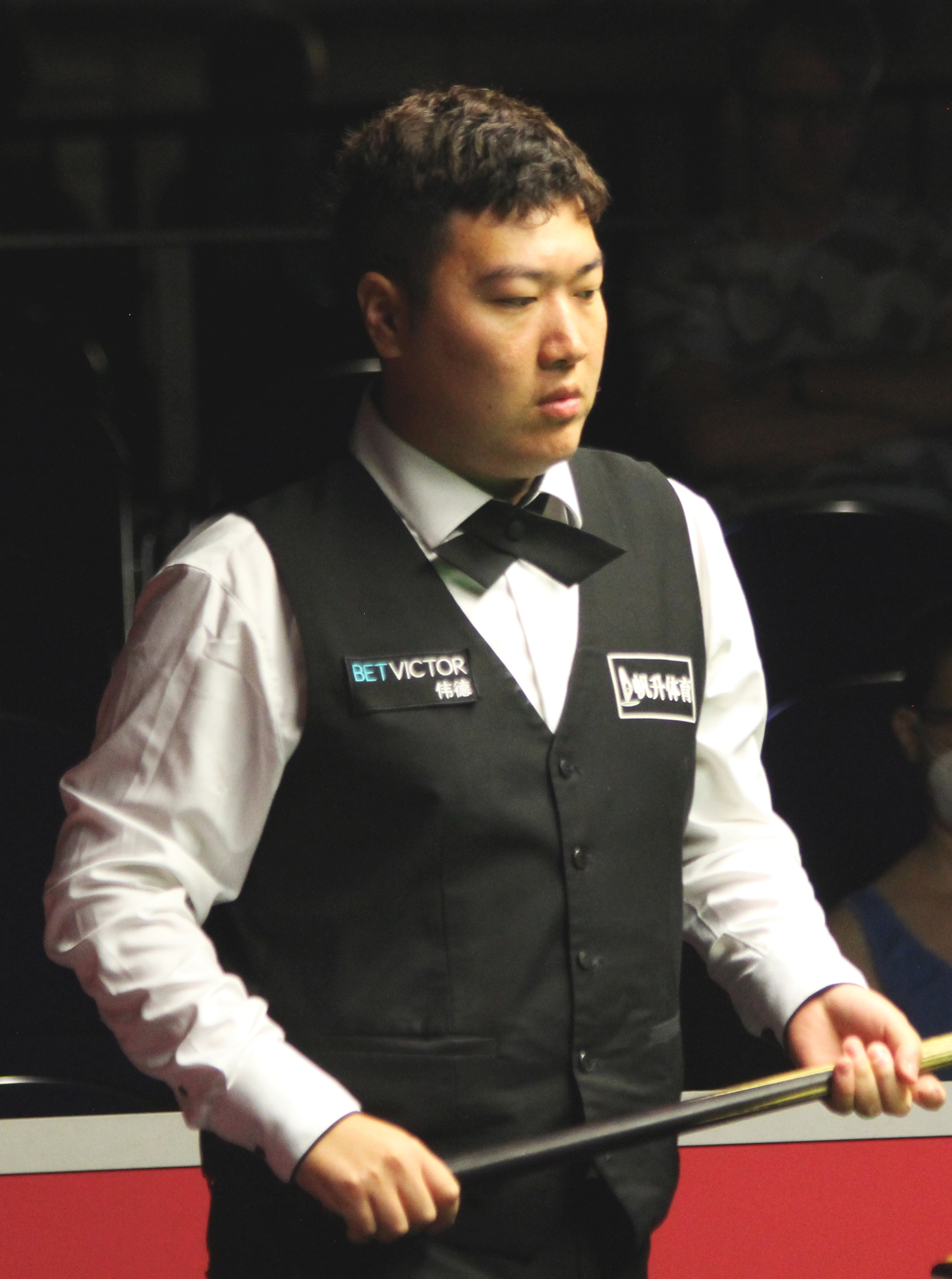
- Yan at the 2022 European Masters

Personal information
- Nickname: The Tiger
- Born: 16 February 2000 (age 26) Zibo, Shandong, China

Sport
- Country: China
- Sport: Snooker
- Professional: 2016–2023
- Highest ranking: 10 (March 2021)
- Century breaks: 153

Tournament wins
- Ranking: 1
Medal record
Men's Snooker
Representing China
Asian Indoor and Martial Arts Games
Gold medal – first place	2017 Ashgabat	Six-red singles
Bronze medal – third place	2017 Ashgabat	Team

Yan Bingtao
- Traditional Chinese: 顏丙濤
- Simplified Chinese: 颜丙涛
Transcriptions
Standard Mandarin
- Hanyu Pinyin: Yán Bǐngtāo
- IPA: [jɛ̌npìŋtʰáʊ]
Yue: Cantonese
- Yale Romanization: Ngàahn Bíng Tòuh
- Jyutping: Ngaan⁴ Bing² Tou⁴

Yan Bingtao (Chinese: 颜丙涛; born 16 February 2000) is a Chinese former professional snooker player who is currently serving a five-year ban from professional competition after committing a range of match-fixing offences. He rose to prominence by winning the ISBF World Snooker Championship, the sport's world amateur title, in 2014 at age 14, which made him the tournament's youngest ever winner. He turned professional in 2016.

Aged 17 years and 284 days, Yan became the youngest player ever to contest a ranking final when he faced Mark Williams at the 2017 Northern Ireland Open, but lost in a deciding frame. Yan claimed his first ranking title at the 2019 Riga Masters, becoming the third Chinese player, after Ding Junhui and Liang Wenbo, to win a ranking event. He made his Masters debut at the 2021 event, where he defeated John Higgins 10–8 in the final to win his first Triple Crown title. Aged 20, Yan became the youngest Masters winner since then-19-year-old Ronnie O'Sullivan won it in 1995.

In December 2022, the WPBSA suspended Yan from the professional tour amid a match-fixing investigation. Following an independent disciplinary tribunal, he was banned from competing professionally until 11 December 2027.

== Career ==
=== Early years ===
Yan Bingtao was born on 16 February 2000 in the city of Zibo, in Shandong province, China.

=== Amateur ===
Yan began to feature in professional competitions at the start of the 2013–14 season, aged 13, in Asian Players Tour Championship events, and as a wildcard player in Chinese ranking tournaments. His first win against a professional came in his first match, against Vinnie Calabrese in the 2013 Yixing Open. He also secured wins over Stuart Bingham, Yu Delu, Barry Pinches and Liang Wenbo during the 2013–14 and 2014–15 seasons. He reached the last 32 of the 2014 Wuxi Classic and 2014 Shanghai Masters.

=== Qualification for professional status ===
In November 2014, Yan won the Amateur World Snooker Championship, beating Muhammad Sajjad of Pakistan 8–7 in the final. Aged 14, Yan also became the youngest winner of the event beating Zhou Yuelong, who won it aged 15 in 2013. This win earned him a two-year professional card for the 2015–16 and 2016–17 seasons.

Yan was unable to take up his entry in the first ranking tournament of the 2015–16 season, the 2015 Australian Goldfields Open, after failing to obtain a UK Visa. He was selected for the Chinese B team in the 2015 Snooker World Cup, with Zhou Yuelong as his teammate. China B started as 50/1 outsiders but they topped their group, knocking out England in the process, before beating Australia and Wales in the knock-out stages, and Scotland in the final. Between them they pocketed a cheque for US$200,000. Defeated finalist Stephen Maguire stated that he believed he had watched two future world champions. Shortly afterwards it was announced that Yan's tour card would be deferred until the 2016–17 season in order for him to complete his education in China and become eligible for a working visa. He did though play in the Champion of Champions for which he gained entry through his World Cup win and, on his debut in the UK, he beat Shaun Murphy 4–2, before losing 3–6 to Neil Robertson in the quarter-finals.

Yan finished the year by winning the San Yuan Cup, an amateur Chinese competition, in Chengdu, beating Jin Long 5–4 in the final.

=== 2016–17 season ===
A trio of deciding frame wins saw Yan reach the fourth round of the Paul Hunter Classic, where he lost 1–4 to Dominic Dale. He also got to the same stage of the English Open with a 4–3 victory over Mark Allen, but again was beaten 4–1 this time by Ricky Walden. His third last 16 exit of the season came at the Northern Ireland Open as he was edged out 4–3 by Anthony Hamilton. After knocking out Liang Wenbo 6–4 in the second round of the UK Championship, Yan met World Cup partner Zhou and was defeated 5–6. Yan qualified for the German Masters by overcoming Sam Baird 5–1 and Shaun Murphy 5–4 and at the venue beat Dale 5–2 and Michael Holt 5–1 to reach the first ranking event quarter-final of his career, which he lost 2–5 to Stuart Bingham. Yan defeated world number one Mark Selby 4–1 in the third round of the Welsh Open, before being knocked out by a reversal of this scoreline to Kurt Maflin. Yan became the second youngest player to compete at the World Championship which he qualified for by beating Sam Craigie 10–8, Mark Davis 10–7 and Alexander Ursenbacher 10–4. He won his first frame at the Crucible with a century break, but was 3–6 down to Shaun Murphy after the opening session. Yan was also 5–9 behind, but won three frames in a row without Murphy potting a ball. He had a good advantage in the 18th frame, but Murphy fluked a red and then cleared the table to eliminate Yan 10–8. At the end of his debut campaign as a professional he was 56th in the world rankings, the second highest of all the players that started the year with no ranking points.

=== 2017–18 season ===
Following his debut, Yan had another successful campaign in the 2017–18 season. His wins over Ronnie O'Sullivan, Ricky Walden, Jack Lisowski, and John Higgins, saw him make his first career semi final, where he lost 2–9 to Mark Allen. He then reached his first career final in the Northern Ireland Open later that month, beating the likes of Robbie Williams, Jamie Barrett, Mark King, Ryan Day, Robert Milkins, and Lyu Haotian along the way, before losing 8–9 to Mark Williams. His world ranking rose rapidly again, standing at 23rd by the end of the season.

=== 2018–19 season ===
Yan's performance in the 2018–19 season perhaps was not as strong as the previous season, but his consistency helped his world ranking to climb to 21st.

=== 2019–20 season – First ranking title ===
This season was Yan's best career season yet. He reached one quarter final, four semi finals, and one final. In addition, Yan defeated Mark Joyce 5–2 in the Riga Masters final to claim his maiden ranking title, becoming the youngest title winner since Ding Junhui won the 2006 Northern Ireland Open. Later in the season, Yan reached the final stage of the World Snooker Championship again, but lost to Judd Trump in the second round.

=== 2020–21 season – Masters champion ===
Yan secured his first triple crown event title at the Masters after beating Neil Robertson, Stephen Maguire, Stuart Bingham, and John Higgins. He became the first debutant to win the tournament since Mark Selby in 2008, and the second Chinese winner of the event after Ding Junhui lifted the title in 2011. He also became the youngest player (20 years old) to win the tournament since Ronnie O'Sullivan in 1995.

== Performance and rankings timeline ==
Tournament	2013/ 14	2014/ 15	2015/ 16	2016/ 17	2017/ 18	2018/ 19	2019/ 20	2020/ 21	2021/ 22	2022/ 23
Ranking (Note: It shows the ranking at the beginning of the season.)	(Note: He was an amateur)			(Note: New players on the Main Tour do not have a ranking)	56	23	21	15	10	15
Ranking tournaments
Championship League	Non-Ranking Event							RR	2R	WD
European Masters	Not Held			1R	1R	1R	WD	QF	3R	3R
British Open	Tournament Not Held								1R	2R
Northern Ireland Open	Not Held			4R	F	1R	4R	QF	SF	2R
UK Championship	A	A	A	3R	3R	3R	SF	2R	2R	1R
Scottish Open	Not Held			1R	3R	3R	2R	2R	1R	2R
English Open	Not Held			4R	4R	2R	1R	2R	QF	WD
World Grand Prix	NH	NR	DNQ	1R	2R	1R	1R	2R	QF	DNQ
Shoot-Out	Non-Ranking Event			1R	1R	1R	SF	WD	1R	A
German Masters	A	A	A	QF	LQ	2R	LQ	LQ	F	WD
Welsh Open	A	A	A	4R	QF	1R	SF	4R	2R	A
Players Championship (Note: The event was called the Players Championship Grand Final (2013/2014−2015/2016))	DNQ	DNQ	DNQ	DNQ	1R	DNQ	F	DNQ	QF	DNQ
WST Classic	Tournament Not Held									A
Tour Championship	Tournament Not Held					DNQ	QF	DNQ	DNQ	DNQ
World Championship	A	A	A	1R	LQ	LQ	2R	2R	QF	A
Non-ranking tournaments
Champion of Champions	A	A	QF	A	A	A	1R	A	SF	A
Masters	A	A	A	A	A	A	A	W	1R	WD
Championship League	A	A	A	A	A	A	A	RR	SF	A
Six-red World Championship	A	A	3R	A	A	WD	2R	Not Held		A
Former ranking tournaments
Wuxi Classic	A	2R	Tournament Not Held							
Shanghai Masters	A	1R	A	LQ	1R	Non-Ranking		Not Held		
Paul Hunter Classic	Minor-Ranking			4R	A	A	NR	Not Held		
Indian Open	A	A	NH	LQ	WD	2R	Tournament Not Held			
China Open	WR	WR	A	LQ	2R	1R	Tournament Not Held			
Riga Masters (Note: The event was called the Riga Open (2014/2015–2015/2016))	NH	MR		3R	LQ	WD	W	Not Held		
International Championship	A	WR	A	2R	SF	3R	2R	Not Held		
China Championship	Not Held			NR	2R	3R	2R	Not Held		
World Open	A	Not Held		LQ	A	2R	1R	Not Held		
Turkish Masters	Tournament Not Held								3R	NH
Gibraltar Open	Not Held		MR	2R	WD	4R	1R	1R	A	NH
Former non-ranking tournaments
Shanghai Masters	Ranking Event					1R	1R	Not Held		

Performance Table Legend
LQ	lost in the qualifying draw	#R	lost in the early rounds of the tournament (WR = Wildcard round, RR = Round robin)	QF	lost in the quarter-finals
SF	lost in the semi-finals	F	lost in the final	W	won the tournament
DNQ	did not qualify for the tournament	A	did not participate in the tournament	WD	withdrew from the tournament

NH / Not Held	means an event was not held.
NR / Non-Ranking Event	means an event is/was no longer a ranking event.
R / Ranking Event	means an event is/was a ranking event.
MR / Minor-Ranking Event	means an event is/was a minor-ranking event.

== Career finals ==
=== Ranking finals: 4 (1 title) ===
Outcome	No.	Year	Championship	Opponent in the final	Score
Runner-up	1.	2017	Northern Ireland Open	(Wales) Mark Williams	8–9
Winner	1.	2019	Riga Masters	(England) Mark Joyce	5–2
Runner-up	2.	2020	Players Championship	(England) Judd Trump	4–10
Runner-up	3.	2022	German Masters	(China) Zhao Xintong	0–9

=== Non-ranking finals: 1 (1 title) ===
Legend
The Masters (1–0)

Outcome	No.	Year	Championship	Opponent in the final	Score
Winner	1.	2021	The Masters	(Scotland) John Higgins	10–8

=== Pro-am finals: 2 (1 title) ===
Outcome	No.	Year	Championship	Opponent in the final	Score
Winner	1.	2017	Asian Indoor and Martial Arts Games (6-red)	(Iran) Soheil Vahedi	5–1
Runner-up	1.	2018	Zibo International Open	(China) Zhou Yuelong	2–5

=== Team finals: 2 (1 title) ===
Outcome	No.	Year	Championship	Team	Opponent in the final	Score
Winner	1.	2015	World Cup	China B	Scotland	4–1
Runner-up	1.	2017	CVB Snooker Challenge	China	Great Britain	9–26

=== Amateur finals: 2 (1 title) ===
Outcome	No.	Year	Championship	Opponent in the final	Score
Winner	1.	2014	IBSF World Snooker Championship	(Pakistan) Muhammad Sajjad	8–7
Runner-up	1.	2015	IBSF World 6-Reds Snooker Championship	(India) Pankaj Advani	2–6
