= 2021 Masters (snooker) =

Professional non-ranking snooker tournament

2021 Betfred Masters
- Tournament logo

Tournament information
- Dates: 10–17 January 2021
- Venue: Marshall Arena
- City: Milton Keynes
- Country: England
- Organisation: World Snooker Tour
- Format: Non-ranking event
- Total prize fund: £725,000
- Winner's share: £250,000
- Highest break: John Higgins (SCO) (145)

Final
- Champion: Yan Bingtao (CHN)
- Runner-up: John Higgins (SCO)
- Score: 10–8

The 2021 Masters (officially the 2021 Betfred Masters) was a professional non-ranking snooker tournament that took place between 10 and 17 January 2021 at the Marshall Arena in Milton Keynes, England. It was the 47th staging of the Masters tournament, which was first held in 1975, and the second of three Triple Crown events in the 2020–21 season, following the 2020 UK Championship and preceding the 2021 World Snooker Championship. The top sixteen players from the snooker world rankings were invited to compete in a knockout tournament. The World Professional Billiards and Snooker Association organised the tournament, which was broadcast by the BBC and Eurosport in Europe. The event was sponsored by sports betting company Betfred. It was played behind closed doors because of COVID-19 restrictions in the United Kingdom. Two players, world number one Judd Trump and Jack Lisowski, withdrew from the event after testing positive for COVID-19.

The defending champion, Stuart Bingham, had defeated Ali Carter 10–8 in the previous year's final. Bingham lost 6–5 to Yan Bingtao in the semi-finals. Yan (one of three debutants at the event, alongside Thepchaiya Un-Nooh and Gary Wilson) met John Higgins in the final. Yan completed a 10–8 victory to win his first Triple Crown tournament. As the winner of the event, Yan was awarded £250,000 from the total prize pool of £725,000. The highest break of the event was a 145 made by Higgins in his quarter-final win over Ronnie O'Sullivan which earned him £15,000.

== Overview ==
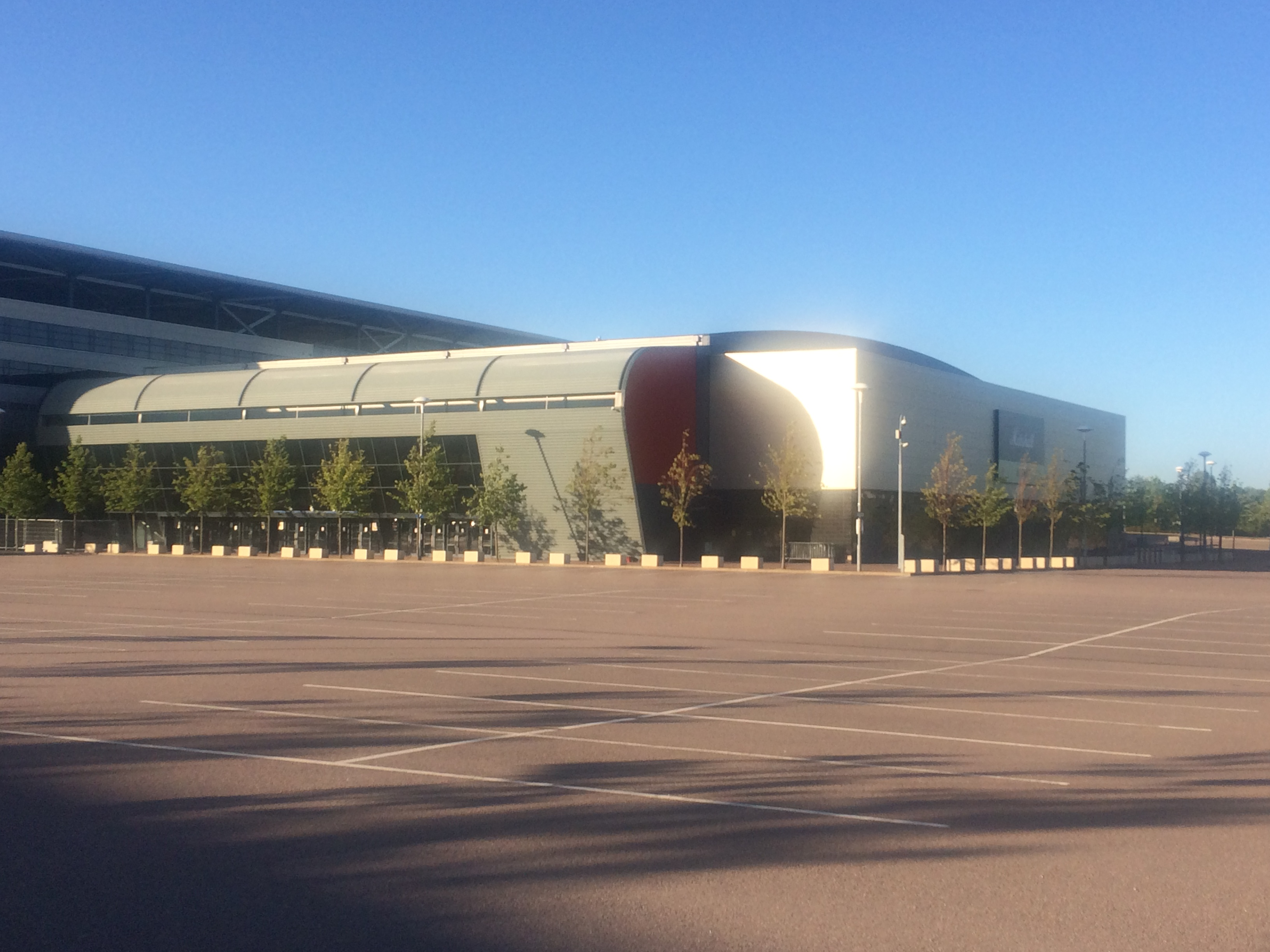
The tournament was moved to the Marshall Arena in Milton Keynes days before the event.

The Masters is an invitational snooker tournament first held in 1975. The event is organised by World Snooker in partnership with the World Professional Billiards and Snooker Association. The 2021 Masters was the second Triple Crown event of the 2020–21 snooker season, following the 2020 UK Championship and preceding the 2021 World Snooker Championship. The tournament was held between 10 and 17 January 2021. The 16 highest-ranked players according to the world rankings after the 2020 UK Championship in December 2020 were invited to the event. World number one Judd Trump and world number fourteen Jack Lisowski tested positive for COVID-19 and were forced to withdraw. Anthony McGill, ranked 17th, would have been the first reserve player but declined to travel to the event, whilst Barry Hawkins, second reserve, also tested positive for COVID-19. Joe Perry replaced Trump in the draw, while Gary Wilson replaced Lisowski.

Initially, the 2021 Masters was scheduled to be held at Alexandra Palace, London, and would have been the first snooker event to host an audience since the 2020 World Snooker Championship in August 2020. However, the event was moved to the Marshall Arena in Milton Keynes, and played without spectators, to comply with stricter regulations against COVID-19.

Stuart Bingham won the previous year's event, defeating Ali Carter in the final 10–8. The draw for the tournament was made during the final of the 2020 UK Championship. As defending champion, Bingham was seeded first, with the next seven players in the world rankings seeded and allocated fixed positions in the draw. They met the remaining eight participants who were drawn randomly. Matches were played as best-of-11 frames until the final, which was contested over a maximum of 19 frames played over two sessions. The World Snooker Tour, a subsidiary of the World Professional Billiards and Snooker Association, organised the event, which was sponsored for the first time by sports betting company Betfred, who replaced previous sponsors Dafabet.

=== Broadcasting ===
The tournament was broadcast live in the United Kingdom by BBC Sport, as well as by Eurosport in Europe. Worldwide, the event was covered by China Central Television and Superstars Online in China and Sky Sport in New Zealand. The event was simulcast in Hong Kong by Now TV with additional commentary; DAZN covered the event across Canada, Brazil and the United States. In all other territories, the event was streamed by Matchroom Sport.

=== Prize fund ===
The prize fund for the event was £725,000, with the winner receiving £250,000. A breakdown is as follows:

- Winner: £250,000
- Runner-up: £100,000
- Semi-finals: £60,000
- Quarter-finals: £30,000
- Last 16: £15,000
- Highest break: £15,000
- Total: £725,000

== Summary ==
=== First round ===
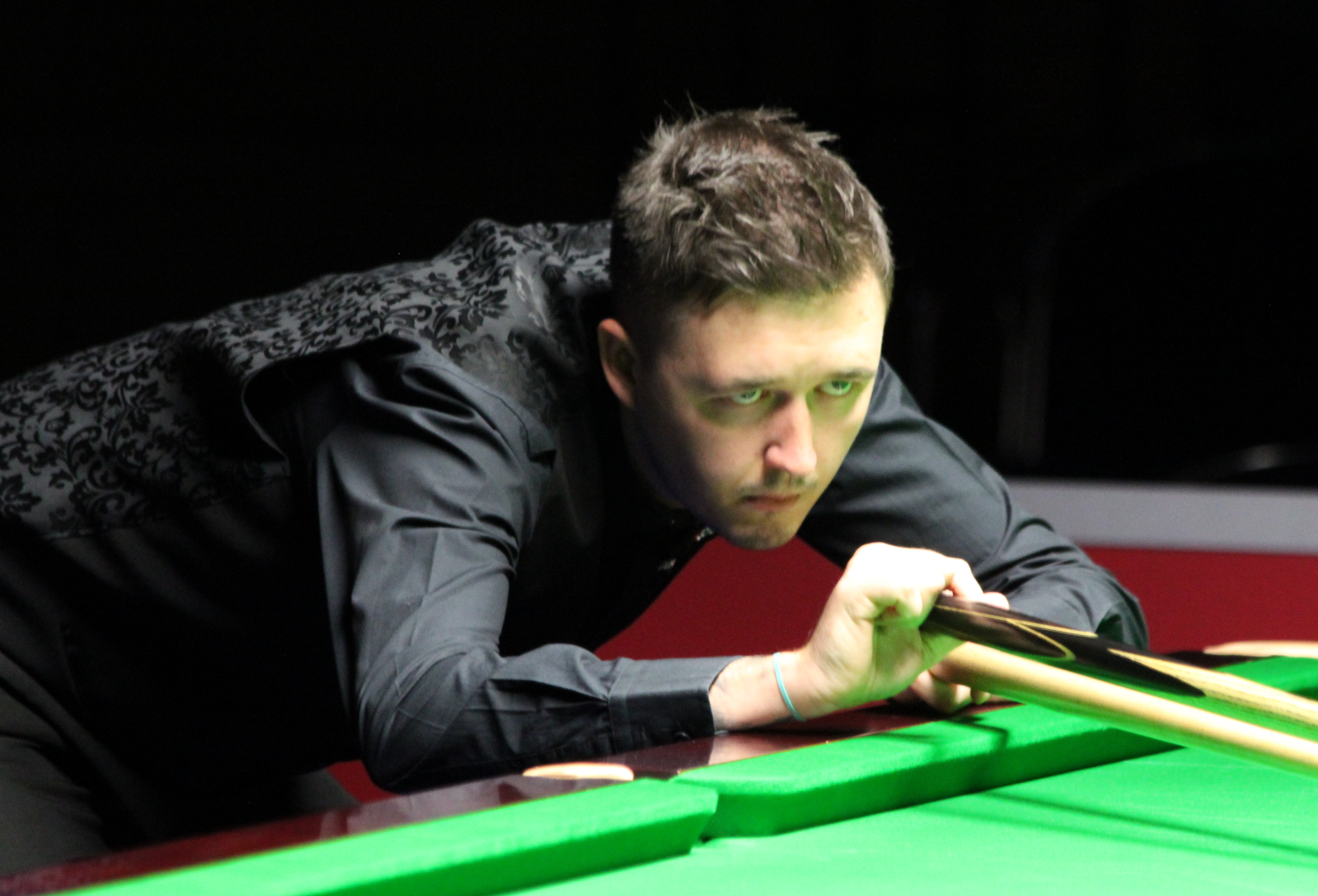
Kyren Wilson (pictured) defeated Gary Wilson in the first round, 6–2.

The Masters began on 10 January, with the first round being played as the best-of-11 frames until 13 January. The 2018 Masters finalist Kyren Wilson met Gary Wilson, world ranking number 19, in the opening match, who was making his debut at the event. Kyren won the opening frame of the match, before Gary won the next two frames. During the third frame, Kyren used a lighter on the top of his cue tip to burn off frayed edges. Kyren won frame four with a century break before leading 4–2 after two flukes in frame six. Kyren won the next two frames with a total clearance break of 136 in frame seven and a break of 65 in frame eight to win 6–2. Kyren credited his play to competing against John Higgins in practice for four days leading up to the match.

David Gilbert had been drawn against the world number one, Judd Trump; however, Trump had been replaced by Joe Perry, who came into the tournament having taken Christmas off and not played, as he had not been expecting to play in the competition. Gilbert won the first four frames of the match to lead 4–0 into the mid-session interval. Gilbert also won frame five with a break of 72. Leading 5–0, Gilbert was unable to complete a whitewash, as Perry won frame six with a break of 73 and frame seven with a century break. However, Gilbert won the match 6–2 after a break of 54.

Defending Masters champion Stuart Bingham met Thepchaiya Un-Nooh, who was making his debut at the event. Bingham made a break of 114 en route to taking a 5–1 lead. In the seventh frame, Bingham was playing for a maximum break, but fouled trying to continue the break and allowed Un-Nooh to clear the table and win the frame. Un-Nooh won the next two frames to trail by one, before Bingham won the match in frame ten 6–4. After the match, Eurosport pundit Neal Foulds suggested that Un-Nooh needed to add more defensive play to his game to win such matches.

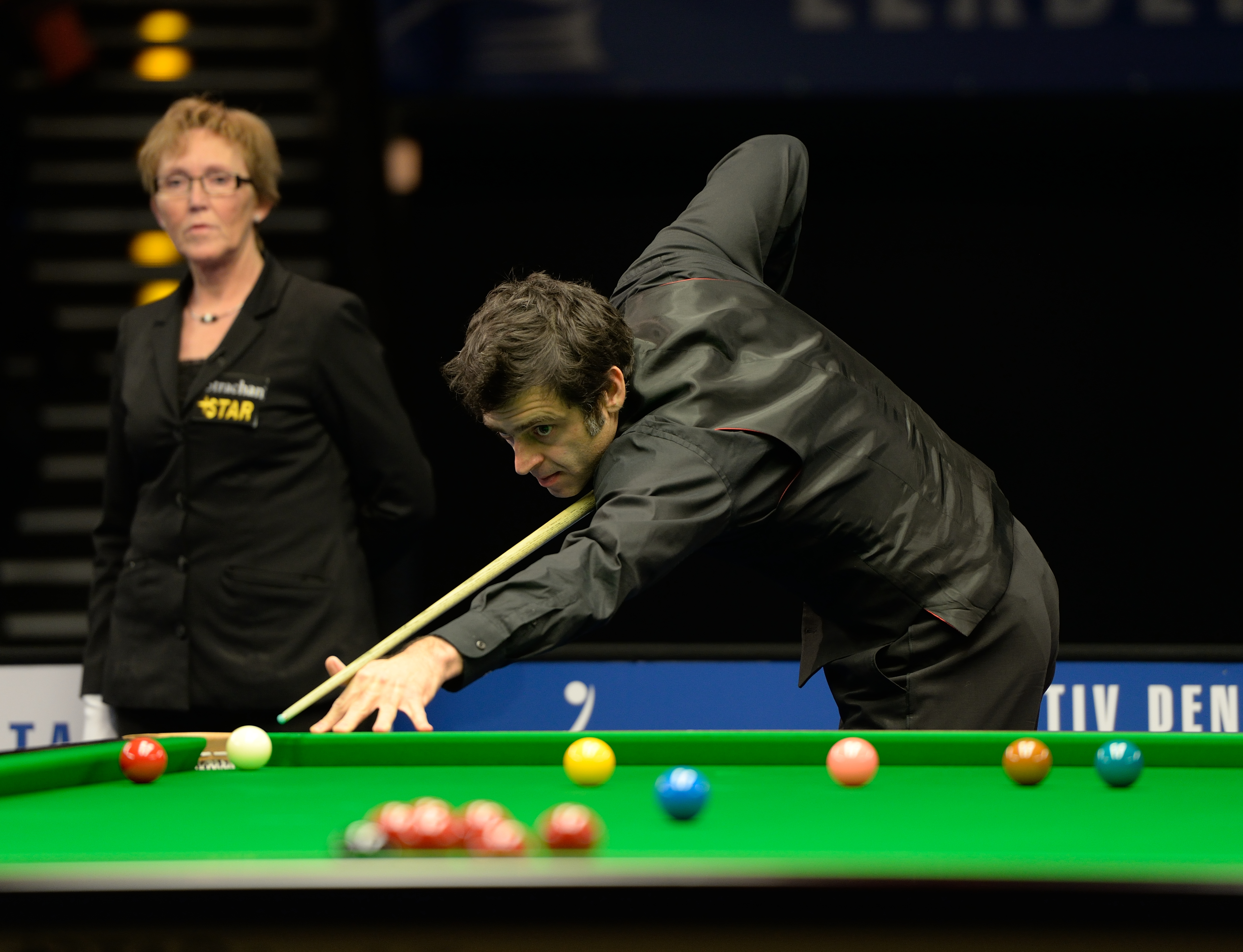
Ronnie O'Sullivan (pictured at table) and Ding Junhui produced 10 breaks of over 70 in their 11-frame match.

Two former winners, Shaun Murphy and Mark Williams, met in the fourth first round match. Leading 2–1, Murphy required the final two balls to win the next frame. He fluked the pink ball before potting a similar shot on the black. Murphy later clarified that he was "embarrassed" by the fluke, but had intentionally played the difficult shot on the black. Williams tied the match at both 3–3 and 4–4 before Murphy won the final two frames to win 6–4. Reigning UK champion Neil Robertson played 20-year-old Yan Bingtao. Robertson took leads of 3–1 and then 5–3 including a break of 121. Yan, however, made breaks of 61 and 55 to force a deciding frame. Yan played most of the colours onto the cushion in the lengthy final frame and won 6–5. Robertson commented after the match that he could not "praise Yan Bingtao highly enough" for his determination during the match.

Ding Junhui made breaks of 83, 75 and 73 to lead Ronnie O'Sullivan 3–0, before O'Sullivan won the next two frames including a century break. Ding then took a lead of 5–3 after another century from each player. He missed pots to win the match in frame nine, allowing O'Sullivan to win the next two frames. He won the match in the deciding frame with a 73 break. The match contained four centuries and a further six breaks of above 70 in the 11-frame match. Three-time champion Steve Davis suggested Ding had "panicked", while the 1997 world champion, Ken Doherty, commented Ding "missed a trick" in not taking advantage to win the match. The match between Mark Allen and John Higgins also went to a deciding frame. Higgins led 5–3, but Allen won the next two frames. A missed brown ball allowed Higgins to make a break of 59 to win 6–5.

=== Quarter-finals ===
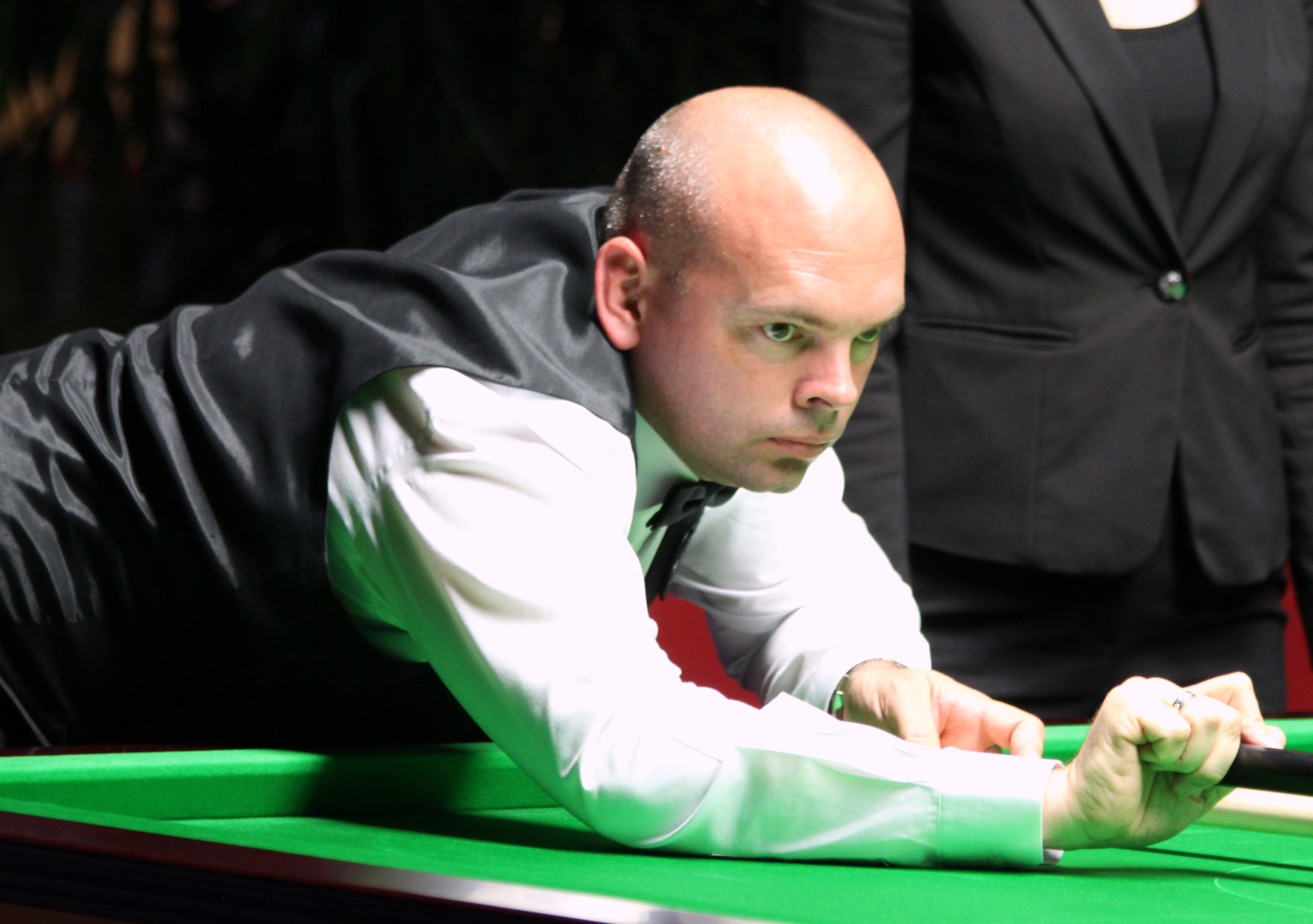
Defending champion Stuart Bingham (pictured) defeated Shaun Murphy in the quarter-finals, 6–3.

The quarter-finals were played on 14 and 15 January. The first was played between Gilbert and Wilson. Gilbert suffered a miscue allowing Wilson to win the opening frame. Gilbert tied the match at 1–1 with a break of 58, however, before he cleared the table and also potted the re-spotted black to win the third frame. Wilson tied the match at 2–2 with a break of 114. The match was later tied again at both 3–3 and 4–4. After a break of 80 in the ninth frame by Wilson, Gilbert again tied the match again at 5–5. Gilbert won the match after Wilson missed a pot on the pink. Davis described Gilbert as a "vastly improved player" and said Wilson would rue the missed pink in the deciding frame. Murphy and Bingham, who had contested the 2015 World Snooker Championship final, met in the second quarter-final. Murphy won the first two frames before Bingham won a frame with a break of 133 and a second recovering from 0–58 points behind. Murphy missed pots in the next two frames allowing Bingham to win the frames, but won the seventh frame with a break of 70. Bingham won the next two frames to win the match 6–3 after a lengthy 47-minute ninth frame.

Yan Bingtao playing in his first Masters event drew Stephen Maguire. Yan took the match's first two frames but lost the next three frames including a break of 102. Two missed red balls by Maguire allowed Yan to win the next two frames and lead 4–3. Maguire evened the score in the next frame with a break of 137, but missed a long pot in the ninth frame to fall behind again. In the tenth frame, attempting a plant, Maguire fluked a separate red ball into the middle pocket and won the frame to force a decider. Yan took the final frame to win 6–5 with the highest break of his career, a 141.

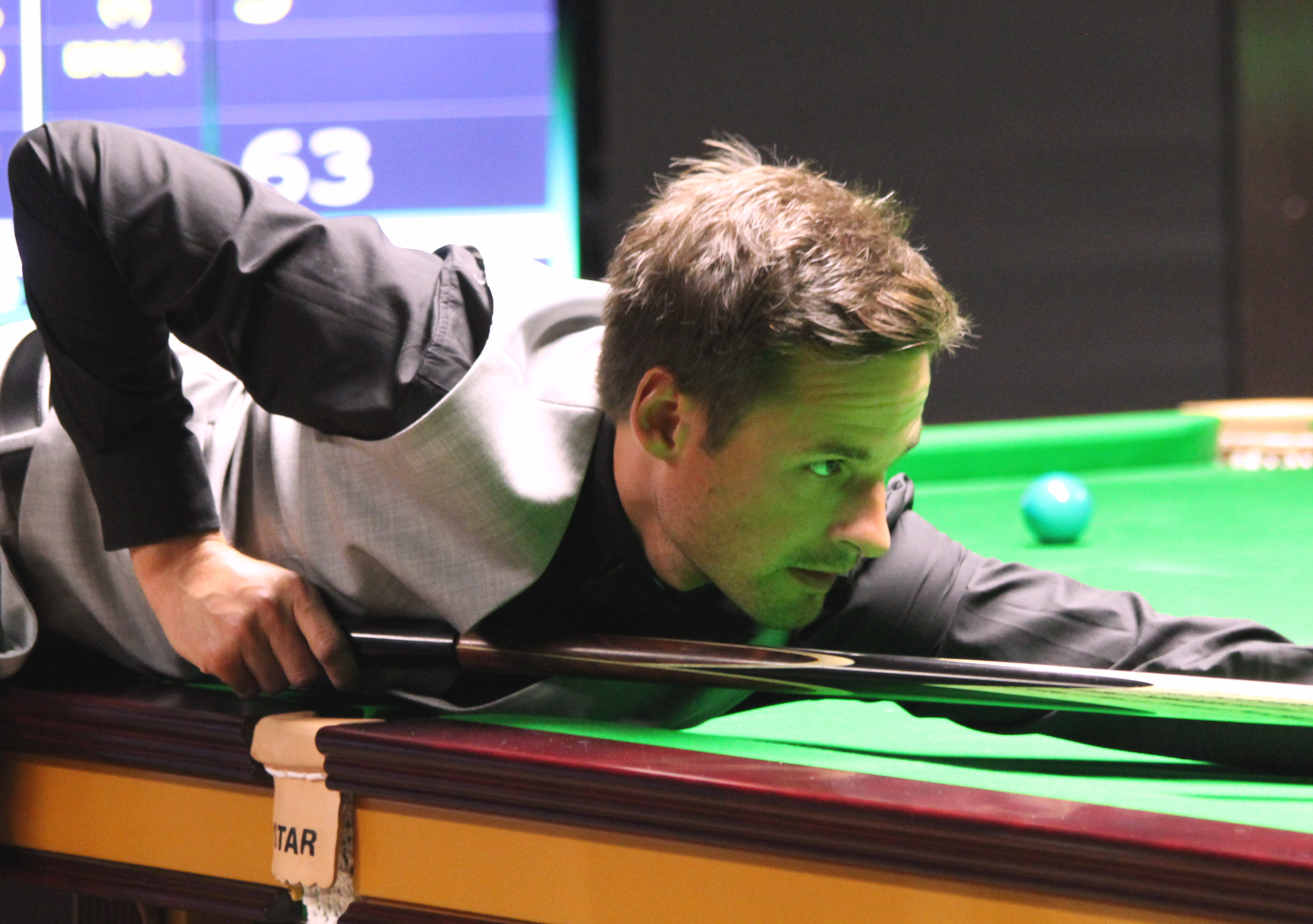
David Gilbert (pictured) reached the semi-finals of the event for the second consecutive year with a 6–5 win over Kyren Wilson.

The last quarter-final was between Higgins and O'Sullivan. This was the 70th competitive match between the two since they turned professional in 1992. O'Sullivan won the opening frame with a break of 97, but Higgins responded with a 110 and 145—the highest of the tournament—to lead 3–1. O'Sullivan made two more century breaks of 125 and 103 in frames five and six to even the score at 3–3. A bad break off by O'Sullivan allowed Higgins to make a 134 in the next frame, the fifth consecutive century break of the match. Higgins won frame eight with a break of 88 and won the match in frame nine 6–3. The five consecutive century breaks equalled the record for the Masters by Robertson and Maguire in 2009. Former world champion John Parrott described Higgins' performance as "spellbinding", whilst six-time winner Stephen Hendry was surprised he did not play to this quality more often. Higgins suggested after the match that he "can't play any better" than he had, as O'Sullivan backed Higgins to win the tournament after this performance.

=== Semi-finals ===
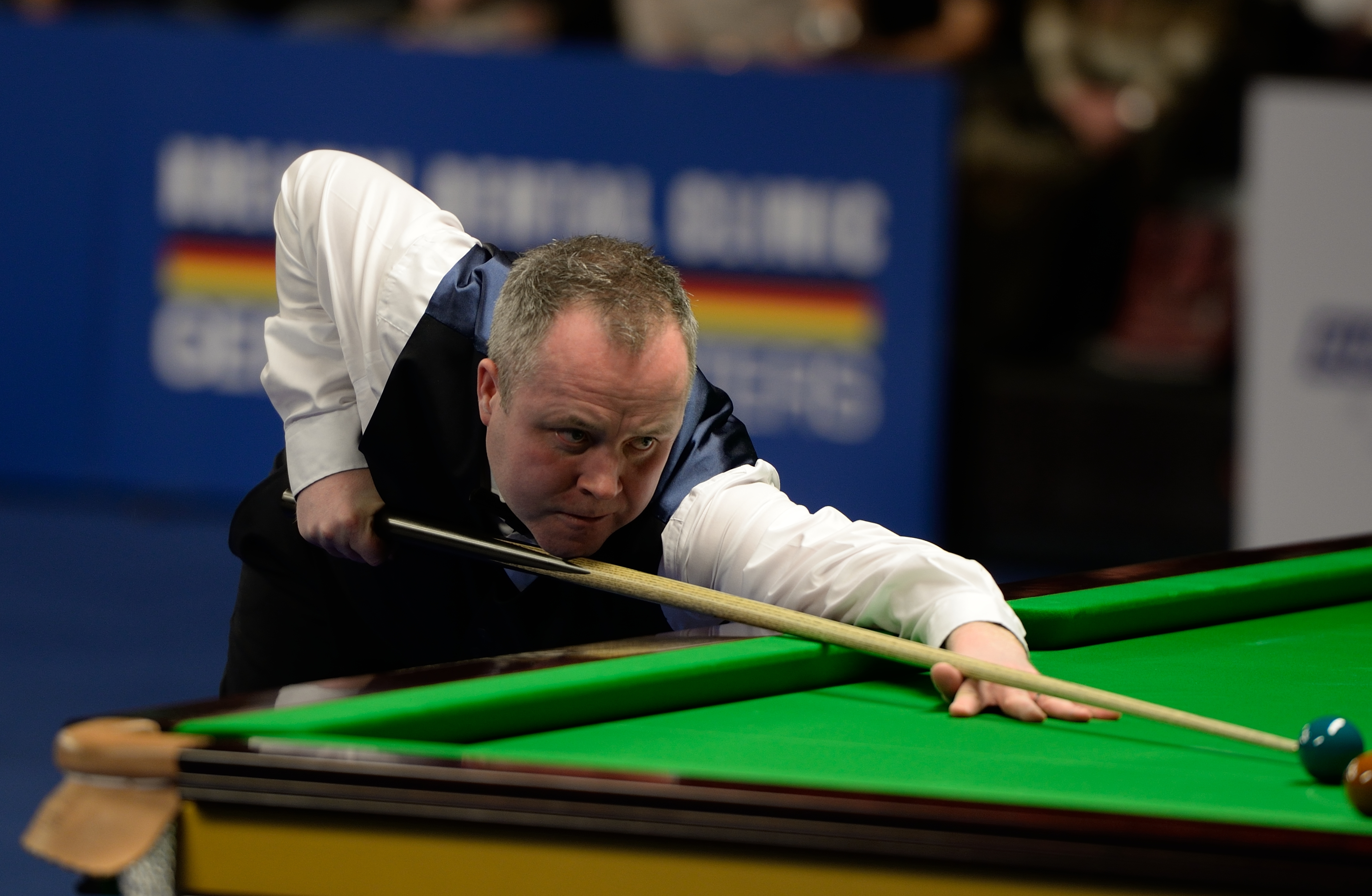
John Higgins reached his first Masters final since the 2006 event.

Both semi-final matches were played on 16 January. Bingham won the opening frame of the match by only seven points before Yan made a break of 94 to equal the match at 1–1. Yan had the first chance in the next two frames, but Bingham won both. Yan won two of the next three frames and trailed 3–4 but won frame eight with a score of 106–0. He took the lead in the ninth frame with a century break. Bingham tied the match after Yan had missed a red. Yan won the match 6–5 after a break of 65 in the deciding frame. Doherty commented that Yan's "composure was fantastic in that last frame", whilst O'Sullivan suggested it was a "significant result for Chinese snooker".

The second semi-final was contested between Gilbert and Higgins. Both players cited their previous meeting in the semi-finals of the 2019 World Snooker Championship, where Higgins won 17–16. Gilbert won the opening frame with a break of 80 before Higgins made a 106 in frame two. The scores were tied at 2–2, with Higgins making a clearance to win frame four. Frame five featured a break of 107 by Higgins, who took a two-frame lead with a break of 55 in frame six. Gilbert tied the match at 4–4 after Higgins missed the final pink to win frame eight. Higgins won the next two frames, however, to win the match 6–4. Higgins commented after the match: "I personally think semi-finals are the worst game, you are close to being in a showpiece and David did not play great."

=== Final ===
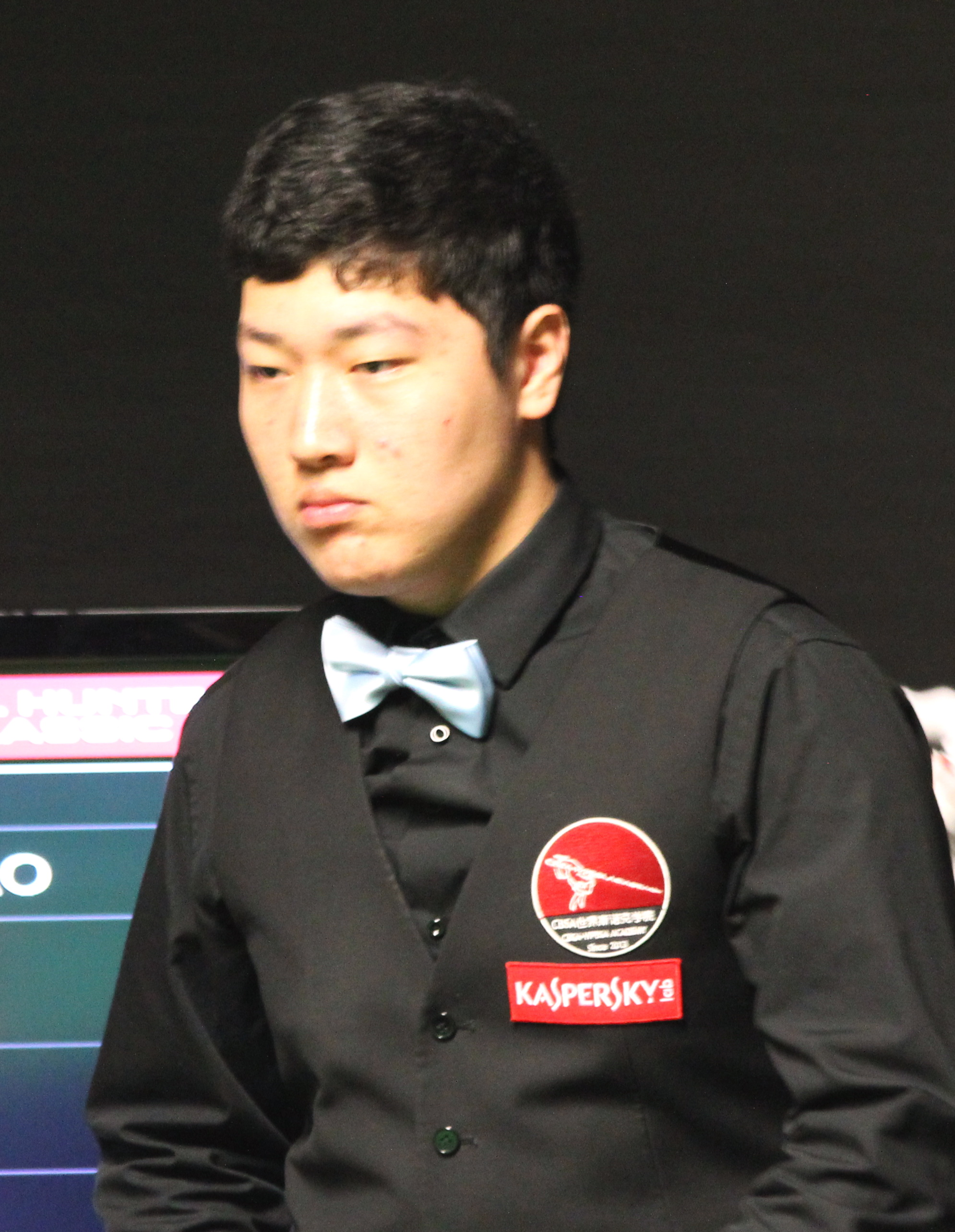
Yan Bingtao (pictured), making his Masters debut at the event, defeated John Higgins 10–8 in the final.

The final was played on 17 January as the best-of-19 frames held over two sessions, refereed by Paul Collier. Higgins had not appeared in the final of the event since he last won the Masters in 2006, whilst Yan was appearing in his first Triple Crown final. Yan took the opening frame of the final, with a break of 66; Higgins won the next. Frame three featured a missed pot on the blue ball by Higgins, who won the fourth to tie the match at 2–2. Higgins took the next two frames, including a break of 98, before Yan made a break of 97 in frame seven. Higgins won frame eight, the final of the first session, to lead 5–3 with a break of 52. Steve Davis referred to Yan as "naive", saying he needed a "flying start and get his tail up" to win the match in the second session.

Higgins opened frame nine with a break of 67, but Yan's clearance forced a re-spotted black. After a prolonged safety battle, Yan cut the black to trail 4–5. Yan made a break of 76 to tie the match at 5–5. Frame 11 featured a break of 51 by Yan, before Higgins made a 74 after making a plant, then a 116 in the next frame to lead again by two frames. With just the final ball remaining in frame 13, Higgins attempted a double but missed allowing Yan to win the frame. Yan made a break of 103 in the next frame to tie the score at 7–7. When Yan won frame 15, Higgins left the arena muttering to himself. Higgins returned and made a break of 63 to tie the score at 8–8. A break of 70 won Yan frame 17. He won the match in frame 18 with a break of 64.

Aged 20 years and 11 months, Yan was the youngest Masters winner since O'Sullivan in 1995, 26 years earlier, and the first debutant winner since Selby in 2008. The odds were 50–1 against Yan becoming champion at the outset of the event. Higgins suggested Yan would become the world champion "without a shadow of a doubt", and winning the event at his age was a "brilliant achievement". Yan commented: "I have imagined how I would celebrate but I am very calm, even though in the last few frames I was not playing very well. But I did not give up." O'Sullivan said he would be "very surprised if he doesn't win at least one or two world titles", whilst Davis commented he was "impressed with his temperament and his nerve" in defeating Higgins.

== Tournament draw ==
Numbers given on the left and in brackets show the players' seeding for the tournament. Players in bold denote match winners.

**First round** Best of 11 frames
**1**	**Stuart Bingham (ENG)**	**6**
16	Thepchaiya Un-Nooh (THA)	4
**8**	**Shaun Murphy (ENG)**	**6**
14	Mark Williams (WAL)	4
5	Mark Selby (ENG)	3
**9**	**Stephen Maguire (SCO)**	**6**
4	Neil Robertson (AUS)	5
**12**	**Yan Bingtao (CHN)**	**6**
Joe Perry (ENG)	2
**13**	**David Gilbert (ENG)**	**6**
**6**	**Kyren Wilson (ENG)**	**6**
Gary Wilson (ENG)	2
**7**	**John Higgins (SCO)**	**6**
10	Mark Allen (NIR)	5
**2**	**Ronnie O'Sullivan (ENG)**	**6**
11	Ding Junhui (CHN)	5

**Quarter-finals**; Best of 11 frames
**1**	**(England) Stuart Bingham**	**6**
8	(England) Shaun Murphy	3
9	(Scotland) Stephen Maguire	5
**12**	**(China) Yan Bingtao**	**6**
**13**	**(England) David Gilbert**	**6**
6	(England) Kyren Wilson	5
**7**	**(Scotland) John Higgins**	**6**
2	(England) Ronnie O'Sullivan	3

**Semi-finals**; Best of 11 frames
1	(England) Stuart Bingham	5
**12**	**(China) Yan Bingtao**	**6**
13	(England) David Gilbert	4
**7**	**(Scotland) John Higgins**	**6**

**Final**; Best of 19 frames
**12**	**(China) Yan Bingtao**	**10**
7	(Scotland) John Higgins	8

=== Final ===
Final: Best of 19 frames. Referee: Paul Collier; Marshall Arena, Milton Keynes, England, 17 January 2021
**Yan Bingtao** (12); China	**10**–8	John Higgins (7); Scotland
Afternoon: **99**–0 (66), 16–**73**, **72**–66, 0–**71** (63), 0–**98** (98), 28–**73**, **97**–48 (97), 44–**70** (53); Evening: **74**–67 (59, 67), **76**–31 (76), 51–**74** (74), 0–**127** (116), **73**–68, **110**–0 (103), **73**–64 (55, 50), 5–**68** (63), **74**–12 (70), **99**–31 (64)
103	Highest break	**116**
1	Century breaks	1
8	50+ breaks	8

== Century breaks ==
There were 30 century breaks made during the tournament, the highest was a 145 by Higgins in his quarter-final match with O'Sullivan.

- 145, 134, 116, 110, 107, 106 – John Higgins
- 141, 123, 103, 100 – Yan Bingtao
- 137, 102 – Stephen Maguire
- 136, 114, 108, 107 – Kyren Wilson
- 133, 114 – Stuart Bingham
- 129, 128 – Ding Junhui
- 125, 103, 103, 100 – Ronnie O'Sullivan
- 121 – Neil Robertson
- 113 – Thepchaiya Un-Nooh
- 108, 108 – Mark Williams
- 108 – Joe Perry
- 106 – Mark Allen

== See also ==
- Impact of the COVID-19 pandemic on sports
