= 2020 Tour Championship =

Snooker tournament

2020 Coral Tour Championship

Tournament information
- Dates: 20–26 June 2020
- Venue: Marshall Arena
- City: Milton Keynes
- Country: England
- Organisation: World Snooker Tour
- Format: Ranking event
- Total prize fund: £380,000
- Winner's share: £150,000
- Highest break: Stephen Maguire (SCO) (139)

Final
- Champion: Stephen Maguire (SCO)
- Runner-up: Mark Allen (NIR)
- Score: 10–6

The 2020 Tour Championship (officially the 2020 Coral Tour Championship) was a professional snooker tournament that took place from 20 to 26 June 2020, at the Marshall Arena in Milton Keynes, England. Organised by the World Snooker Tour, it was the second edition of the Tour Championship and the third and final event of the second season of the Coral Cup. It was the 16th and penultimate ranking event of the 2019–20 snooker season following the Gibraltar Open and preceding the World Championship. The tournament was originally scheduled for 17 to 22 March 2020, but on the morning of 17 March the event was postponed due to the COVID-19 pandemic. Following advice from the UK government, it had been decided that no spectators would be permitted at the event.

The draw for the Tour Championship comprised the top eight players based on the single year ranking list. The event was contested as a single-elimination tournament, with each match played over a minimum of two sessions and the final being a best-of-19-frames match. The winner of the tournament won £150,000 out of a total prize fund of £380,000. The event was sponsored by betting company Coral.

Ronnie O'Sullivan was the defending champion, having defeated Neil Robertson 13–11 in the 2019 final; however, O'Sullivan failed to qualify for the 2020 event, placing 18th on the one-year ranking list at the cut-off date. China's Ding Junhui, fifth on the one-year ranking list, was unable to travel to the event because of the COVID-19 situation. His replacement was Stephen Maguire, ranked ninth, who reached the final after defeating Robertson and Judd Trump. His opponent in the final was Mark Allen, who defeated Shaun Murphy and Mark Selby in the two earlier rounds. Maguire won the final 10–6 to claim his first ranking title for seven years, and the sixth of his career.

== Overview ==
The 2020 Tour Championship was the third and final event in the 2020 Coral Cup series, first introduced in the 2018–19 snooker season, the first two events being the World Grand Prix and the Players Championship. It was the 16th and penultimate ranking event of the 2019–20 snooker season, organised by the World Snooker Tour. The players qualified for the series by virtue of their placement on the one-year ranking list (the ranking points won over the 2019–20 season), rather than by their current world ranking positions. The Tour Championship featured the top eight players from the one-year ranking list taking part in a single-elimination tournament. All matches in the first two rounds were played over a maximum of 17 frames, and the final was played as a best-of-19-frames match.

The tournament was primarily broadcast by ITV4 in the United Kingdom. It also aired on Sky Sport in New Zealand, NowTV in Hong Kong, and Superstars Online in China. Eurosport did not broadcast the event, after covering all but one of the other snooker tournaments in the season. The event was sponsored by sports betting company Coral. The Tour Championship was set to take place from 17 to 22 March 2020 in Llandudno, Wales, but on the morning of 17 March the event was postponed, following advice from the UK government that no spectators should be allowed into the event because of the COVID-19 pandemic. On 5 June 2020, the tournament was rescheduled to be held between 20 and 26 June 2020 and moved to a different venue, the Marshall Arena in Milton Keynes, England. The Tour Championship was the second professional snooker tournament to take place after the season had been halted by the pandemic, the first being the 2020 Championship League which had taken place earlier the same month at the same venue. All players and staff admitted into the arena were tested for COVID-19 and placed into isolation for the duration of the event.

=== Qualification ===
Qualification for the event was determined on the basis of the one-year ranking list up to and including the 2020 Gibraltar Open. Fifth seed Ding Junhui withdrew prior to the tournament because of travel complications caused by the COVID-19 pandemic. Ding's replacement was Stephen Maguire, ranked ninth on the one-year ranking list.

Rank	Player	Total Points
1	Judd Trump (ENG)	706,500
2	Shaun Murphy (ENG)	383,000
3	Mark Selby (ENG)	285,500
4	Neil Robertson (AUS)	274,500
~~5~~	~~Ding Junhui~~ (CHN)	261,250
6	Yan Bingtao (CHN)	206,500
7	Mark Allen (NIR)	165,500
8	John Higgins (SCO)	158,500
9	Stephen Maguire (SCO)	152,000

=== Prize fund ===
The event had a prize fund of £380,000, with the winner receiving £150,000. The breakdown of prize money for the event is shown below:

- Winner: £150,000
- Runner-up: £60,000
- Semi-final: £40,000
- Quarter-final: £20,000 (Prize money at this stage does not count towards prize money rankings)
- Highest break: £10,000
- Total: £380,000

== Summary ==
=== Quarter-finals ===
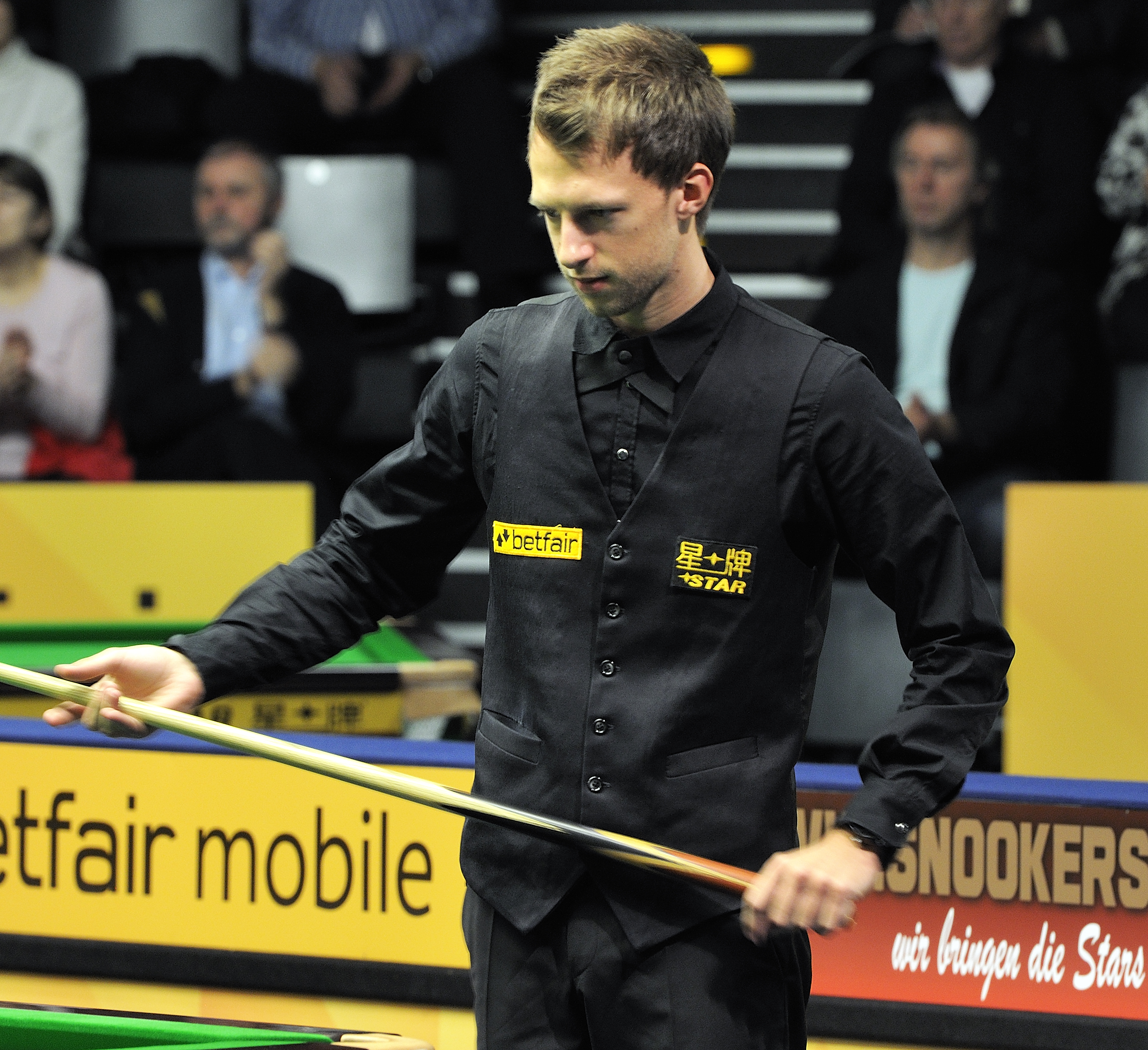
Judd Trump (pictured in 2013) exceeded £1 million in prize money for the season with his first-round win.

The first round of the tournament was the quarter-finals, held from 20 to 23 June, with matches played over two sessions as best of 17 frames. The first match was between Neil Robertson and Stephen Maguire, the replacement for Ding Junhui who had been unable to travel to the event from China. Robertson and Maguire had met earlier in the season at the Masters, where Maguire had won 6–5 despite trailing 1–5 earlier in the match. Maguire took three of the four opening frames to lead 3–1, before Robertson made breaks of 100 and 103, winning the next three. Maguire levelled the score at the end of the opening session at 4–4, both players having made two century breaks. Robertson won the first frame of the evening session, but then scored only four points in the next four frames, as Maguire made breaks of 103, 135, 111 and 115, to lead 8–5. Maguire also took frame 14, with a break of 59, to win the match 9–5.

Maguire made six century breaks during the match, the two players compiling a total of eight centuries between them; both of these figures were a new record for century breaks in a best-of-17-frames match. Desmond Kane, writing for Eurosport, suggested that Maguire had "produced the greatest performance of his 22-year career", with which Maguire agreed. Post-match, Robertson commented that the match table was playing easy, and he likened the pockets to those of nine-ball, where they are significantly larger.

The second match was between reigning world champion and world number one, Judd Trump, and world number five John Higgins. The pair had last met in the final of the 2019 World Snooker Championship. Having qualified for the Tour Championship, Trump was guaranteed to exceed £1 million in prize money for the season. Trump won the opening two frames, before Higgins won the third on the final black ball. Trump took the next two frames, and had developed a 5–3 lead by the end of the first session. He also won the first three frames on the resumption of play, with breaks of 67, 53 and 135, to lead 8–3. Higgins won frame 12, but Trump took the next to win the match 9–4, his fifth successive win against Higgins. Trump commented afterwards that the conditions on the playing table were not the same as the previous day.

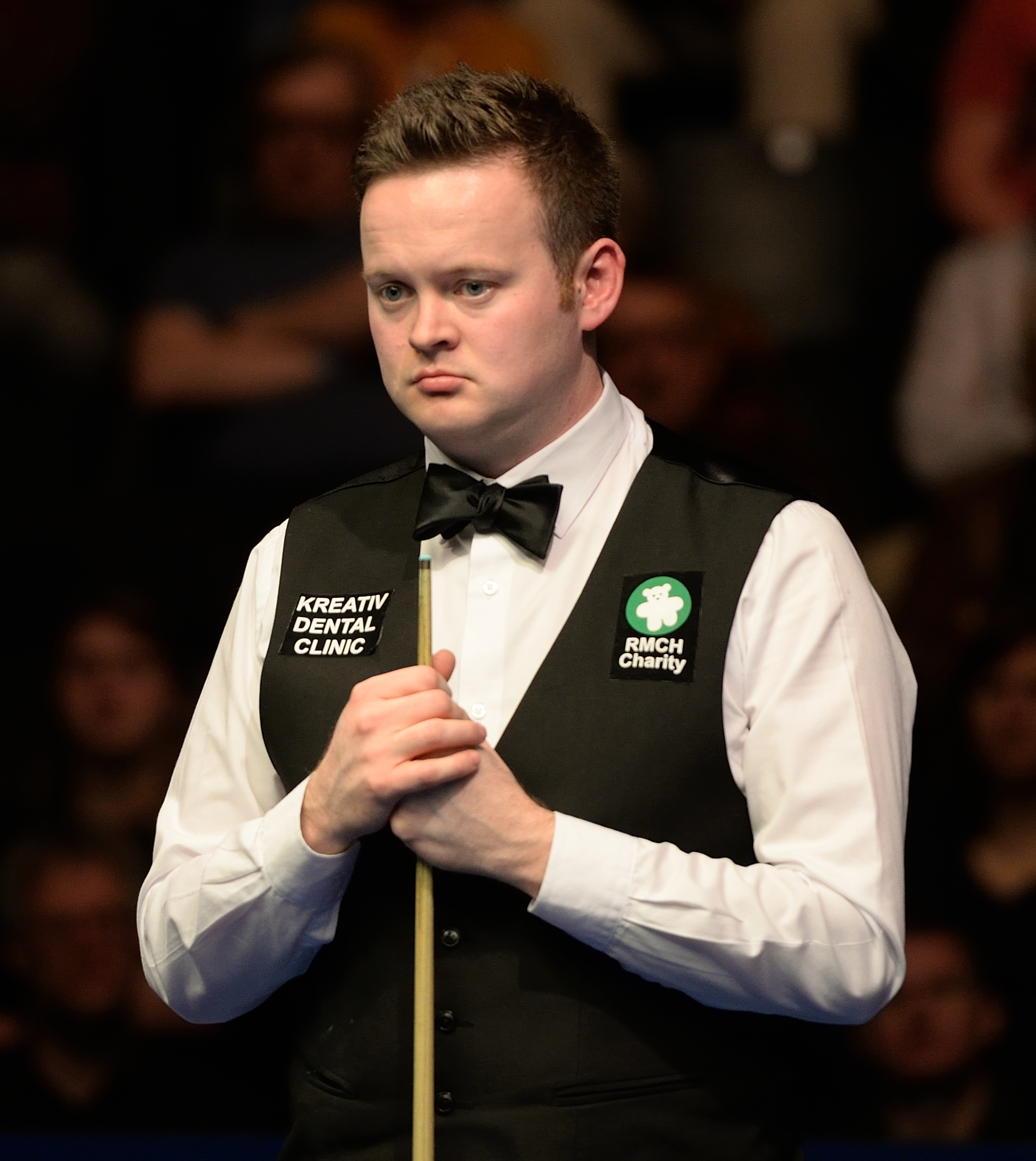
Shaun Murphy (pictured in 2015) completed six century breaks in his quarter-final loss to Mark Allen.

Yan Bingtao and Mark Selby contested the third quarter-final. Selby won the first frame of the match, but scored only 26 points over the next three frames. Trailing 1–3, he won the next three frames with breaks of 99, 119 and 61 to lead 4–3, but Yan won frame eight to tie the match after the first session. Selby won three of the first four frames in the second session, including three breaks of over 50, to go 7–5 ahead. Trailing by 64 points in frame 12, Yan cleared the table to force a respotted black; Selby played the black around the angles and fluked the ball into the corner pocket. Yan won one more frame, but Selby took the 15th to win the match 9–6.

The last quarter-final was played between Mark Allen and Shaun Murphy. In the first session, Murphy scored three century breaks to lead 3–2 but lost the next two frames to trail 3–4. He then fluked the frame ball in frame eight to level the match, won frame nine with a break of 100, and also took frame 10 to lead 6–4. Allen won the next frame, but Murphy made a break of 131 to lead 7–5. Allen won the next two frames to tie the match, before Murphy made his sixth century break in the next to lead 8–7. Allen won frame 16 to force a deciding frame, in which he fluked a red ball and made a break of 62 to win the match 9–8. Murphy's six century breaks equalled the record set by Maguire earlier in the tournament for the most 100+ breaks in a best-of-17-frames match.

=== Semi-finals ===
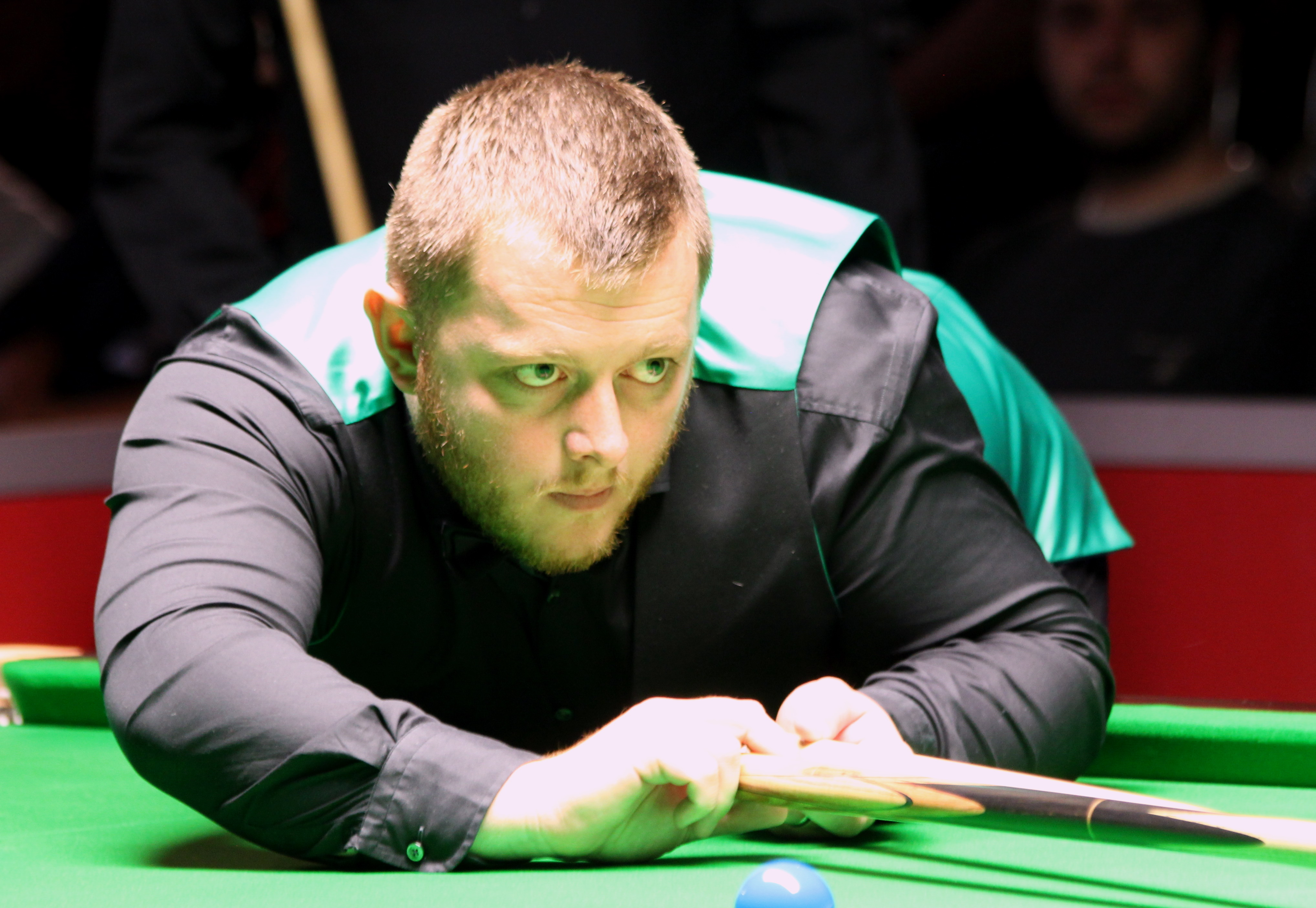
Mark Allen won the first six frames in his 9–2 semi-final win over Mark Selby.

The semi-finals were also played as best-of-17-frames matches over two sessions on 24 and 25 June. The first semi-final was between Judd Trump and Stephen Maguire, the two remaining players still able to win the Coral Cup; whilst Maguire needed to win the tournament for the cup, Trump was only required to win this match. Maguire took a 2–1 lead after the first three frames, but Trump won the next three to lead 4–2. Maguire won frame seven, and then frame eight with a break of 132, to finish the first session tied at 4–4. The pair shared the next two frames, before Trump won frame 11 after a break of 79. Maguire won frame 12, which lasted over 40 minutes, to draw level again at 6–6; he then took three straight frames to win the match 9–6.

ITV commentator and analyst Stephen Hendry commented on Trump's performance saying "That's the worst I think I've seen Judd [Trump] play for a long time." Trump again mentioned the playing conditions, describing them as "pretty poor", and explained "that's why the standard was so bad. If the conditions are good I seem to play well. It's too hot to play snooker today. It's just a shame the conditions are so bad."

The second semi-final was between Mark Allen and Mark Selby. Allen won all of the first four frames of the match, without Selby potting a single ball. Allen also won the next two frames, to lead 6–0. Selby then took frame seven, but Allen won the final frame of the first session to re-establish his six-frame lead at 7–1. Selby won frame nine with a break of 71, before Allen won the next two, including a break of 81 in frame eleven to win the match 9–2.

=== Final ===
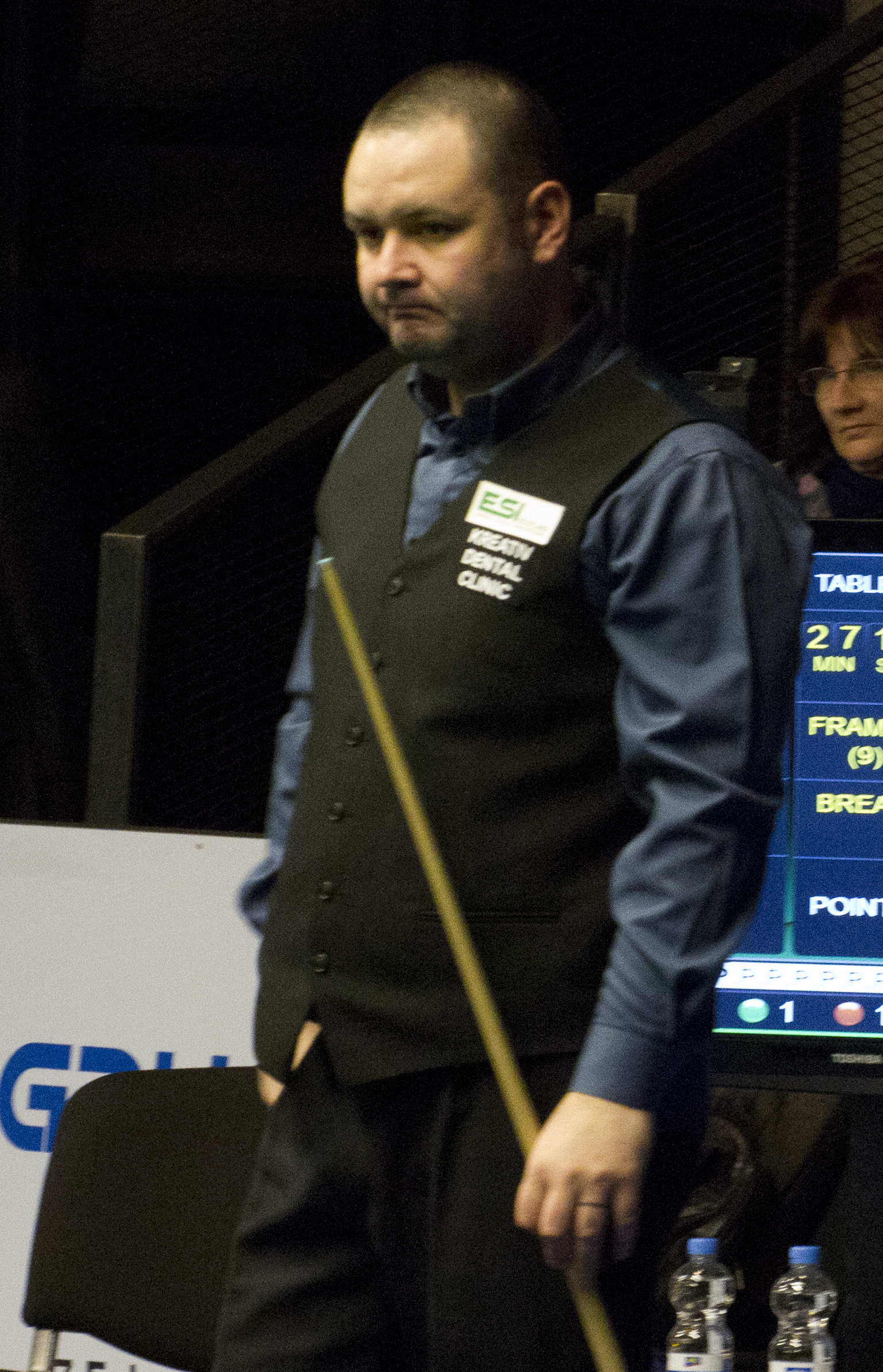
Stephen Maguire won the event, his first ranking win since 2013.

The final between Mark Allen and Stephen Maguire was played on 26 June as a best-of-19-frames match over two sessions. The two players had met on six previous occasions, Allen having won four of those matches. Their most recent encounter was in the semi-finals of the 2019 UK Championship, which had resulted in a 6–0 victory for Maguire.

Allen won the first two frames with breaks of 50 and 76 before Maguire made breaks of 89 and 69 to level the match at 2–2. Maguire won the next frame to lead 3–2 before Allen made a century break to draw level again at 3–3. The final two frames of the first session were shared between the two players, tying the match at 4–4 at the first interval. In the second session, Maguire made the highest break of the tournament, a 139, to win frame nine. He also won the next frame to lead 6–4, and extended his lead to 7–5 before the final interval. Maguire then made breaks of 78 and 53 to lead 9–5, taking him just one frame away from victory. Allen won frame 15 with a break of 107. Frame 16 was dominated by safety play, and was eventually decided on the final two colours. Allen had a shot on the pink ball, but missed, before Maguire potted both balls to win the frame, and the match, 10–6.

This was Maguire's first ranking event title since the 2013 Welsh Open. In winning the event, Maguire also won the Coral Cup, as well as the prize for the highest break; worth a total of £260,000, this was the highest prize money haul of his career. Allen was promoted to fourth in the world rankings, the highest position of his career.

== Tournament draw ==
Quarter-finals; Best of 17 frames
1	Judd Trump (ENG)	9
8	John Higgins (SCO)	4
4	Neil Robertson (AUS)	5
R	Stephen Maguire (SCO)	9
3	Mark Selby (ENG)	9
6	Yan Bingtao (CHN)	6
2	Shaun Murphy (ENG)	8
7	Mark Allen (NIR)	9

Semi-finals; Best of 17 frames
1	(England) Judd Trump	6
R	(Scotland) Stephen Maguire	9
3	(England) Mark Selby	2
7	(Northern Ireland) Mark Allen	9

Final; Best of 19 frames
R	(Scotland) Stephen Maguire	10
7	(Northern Ireland) Mark Allen	6

=== Final ===
Final: Best of 19 frames. Referee: Rob Spencer; Marshall Arena, Milton Keynes, England, 26 June 2020
Stephen Maguire (R); Scotland	10–6	Mark Allen (7); Northern Ireland
Afternoon: 19–69, 0–76, 89–1, 75–50, 56–45, 0–125 (125), 31–62, 71–18; Evening: 139–0 (139), 77–23, 38–69, 74–36, 78–9, 74–0, 0–107 (107), 80–72
139	Highest break	125
1	Century breaks	2

== Coral Cup ==
The 2018–19 snooker season introduced the Coral Cup series, featuring three events: the World Grand Prix, the Players Championship, and the Tour Championship. Qualification for the three events was based on players' rankings on the one-year ranking list. Stephen Maguire received the £100,000 bonus for topping the Coral Cup series. The top ten players who accumulated the most prize money over the three events is shown below: (Note: Prizes in bold denote an event win)

Rank	Player	World Grand Prix	Players Championship	Tour Championship	Total
1	(Scotland) Stephen Maguire	0	30,000	150,000	180,000
2	(England) Judd Trump	7,500	125,000	40,000	172,500
3	(Australia) Neil Robertson	100,000	0	0	100,000
4	(Northern Ireland) Mark Allen	0	15,000	60,000	75,000
5	(England) Mark Selby	0	15,000	40,000	55,000
6	(China) Yan Bingtao	0	50,000	0	50,000
7	(Scotland) Graeme Dott	40,000	0	0	40,000
8	(England) Shaun Murphy	0	30,000	0	30,000
9	(Scotland) John Higgins	12,500	15,000	0	27,500
9	(England) Joe Perry	12,500	15,000	0	27,500

== Century breaks ==
There were 22 century breaks made during the tournament, the highest being a 139 compiled by Stephen Maguire in the ninth frame of the final.

- 139, 135, 132, 117, 115, 111, 108, 103 – Stephen Maguire
- 135 – Judd Trump
- 131, 117, 116, 110, 100, 100 – Shaun Murphy
- 125, 107, 100 – Mark Allen
- 119, 105 – Mark Selby
- 103, 100 – Neil Robertson
