= 2019 Riga Masters =

Snooker tournament

2019 Kaspersky Riga Masters
Tournament information
- Dates: 26–28 July 2019
- Venue: Arēna Rīga
- City: Riga
- Country: Latvia
- Organisation: World Snooker
- Format: Ranking event
- Total prize fund: £278,000
- Winner's share: £50,000
- Highest break: Jack Lisowski (ENG) (145)

Final
- Champion: Yan Bingtao (CHN)
- Runner-up: Mark Joyce (ENG)
- Score: 5–2

The 2019 Riga Masters (also known as the 2019 Kaspersky Riga Masters due to sponsorship) was a professional ranking snooker tournament held from 26 to 28 July 2019 at the Arēna Rīga in Riga, Latvia. It was the sixth Riga Masters event, with the first being held in 2013, and the first ranking event of the 2019/2020 snooker season. The defending champion, Neil Robertson, previously defeated Jack Lisowski in the 2018 final. However, Robertson and several other players were forced to withdraw from qualifying round matches due to flight cancellations, and therefore could not compete in the event.

Yan Bingtao defeated Mark Joyce 5–2 in the final, winning the event and earning his first career ranking title. Yan became the first teenager to win a ranking event in 13 years since Ding Junhui won the 2006 Northern Ireland Trophy aged 19. No players from the top 20 in the world reached the quarter-finals. Lisowski scored the highest break of the tournament, a 145. The event had a total prize fund of £278,000 with the winner receiving £50,000. Qualifying for the event was held between 10 and 13 June 2019 at the Ponds Forge International Sports Centre in Sheffield, England.

== Format ==
The tournament was played from 26 to 28 July 2019 at the Arēna Rīga in Riga, Latvia. The event was organised by the World Professional Billiards and Snooker Association, and sponsored by Kaspersky Lab. Matches were played as best-of-seven frames until the semi-finals, which were best-of-nine frames. The quarter-finals, semi-finals, and final were all played on 28 July. The event was broadcast on Eurosport Player (Pan-Europe); NowTV (Hong Kong); Truesport Thailand; and Superstars Online, Youku, and Zhibo.tv (China).

=== Prize fund ===
The prize fund was slightly increased from the 2018 event. The champion still received £50,000, but the total prize fund increased from £259,000 to £278,000, as follows:

- Winner: £50,000
- Runner-up: £25,000
- Semi-final: £15,000
- Quarter-final: £6,000
- Last 16: £4,000
- Last 32: £3,000
- Last 64: £2,000
- Highest break: £5,000
- Total: £278,000

== Tournament summary ==
=== Early rounds ===
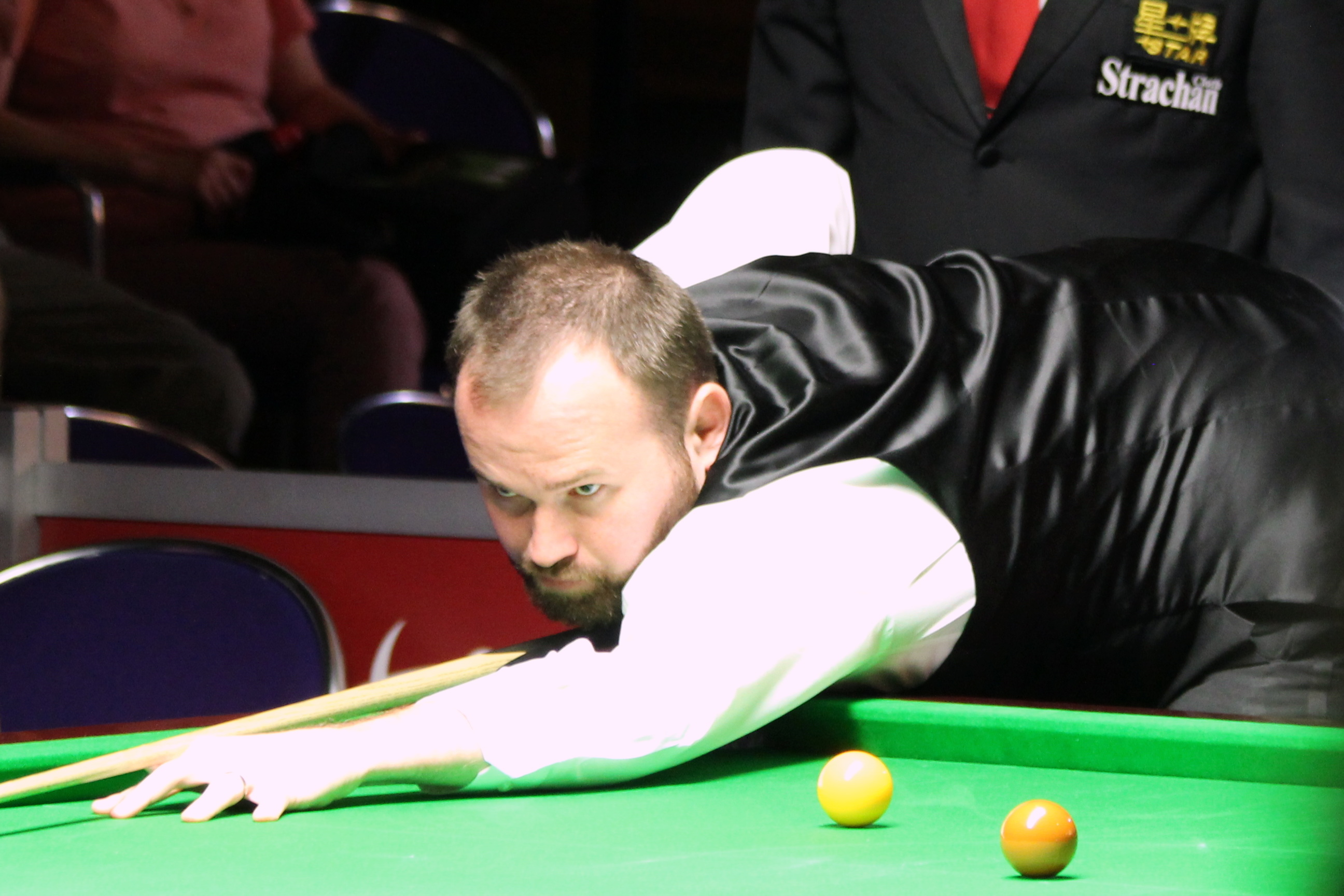
Mark Joyce reached his first ranking event final, defeating 2018 runner-up Jack Lisowski in the round of 16.

The round-of-64 began on 26 July 2019 in Riga, Latvia. Due to flight complications, many players missed the event and had to withdraw, including two-time and defending champion Neil Robertson, Kyren Wilson, and Joe O'Connor. World Snooker commented that due to the number of players missing their matches, it would be difficult to reschedule the affected matches. The held-over qualifying match between Robertson and Robert Milkins was not held as both players were unable to compete in the event, which gave Ben Woollaston a bye into the last 32. Milkins and Robertson made Twitter comments on their encounter, as penalty frames were awarded to each player for not appearing in the match.

Three-time world champion Mark Williams defeated James Cahill 4–3, but Williams did not realise he could score a century break, after turning down the final black ball. Mark Selby received two byes before facing Graeme Dott in the second round. Dott won the first three frames of the match, but Selby won the final four to progress. In the round of 16, Selby lost to Stuart Carrington. The 2018 runner-up Jack Lisowski reached the round of 16, before losing to Mark Joyce.

=== Quarter-finals ===
After the round-of-16, no player qualifying for the quarter-finals was ranked in the top 20 in the world. With a ranking of 21, Yan Bingtao was the highest ranked player in the quarter-finals. The quarter-finals, semi-finals, and finals were all played on 28 July. In the quarter-finals, Joyce, who was world rank 54, defeated Carrington 4–1 to advance to the semi-finals, marking his best performance in a ranking event. After defeating Lyu Haotian and Thepchaiya Un-Nooh in previous rounds, Kurt Maflin defeated Luo Honghao 4–1, reaching his third career semi-final. Matthew Selt defeated Mark King 4–1 to reach the semi-final. Selt was the only remaining player who had previously won a ranking event (the 2019 Indian Open). Yan defeated Li Hang 4–3 to reach the semi-finals for the first time since the 2017 Northern Ireland Open.

=== Semi-finals ===
In the first semi-final, Joyce and Maflin exchanged frames throughout the match, with each player alternately winning each frame to tie at 4–4. After Maflin missed a yellow ball, Joyce made a match-high break of 126 to win 5–4. In the second semi-final, Yan defeated Selt 5–3. Neither player made a century break. However, Yan scored a match-high break of 88 to win.

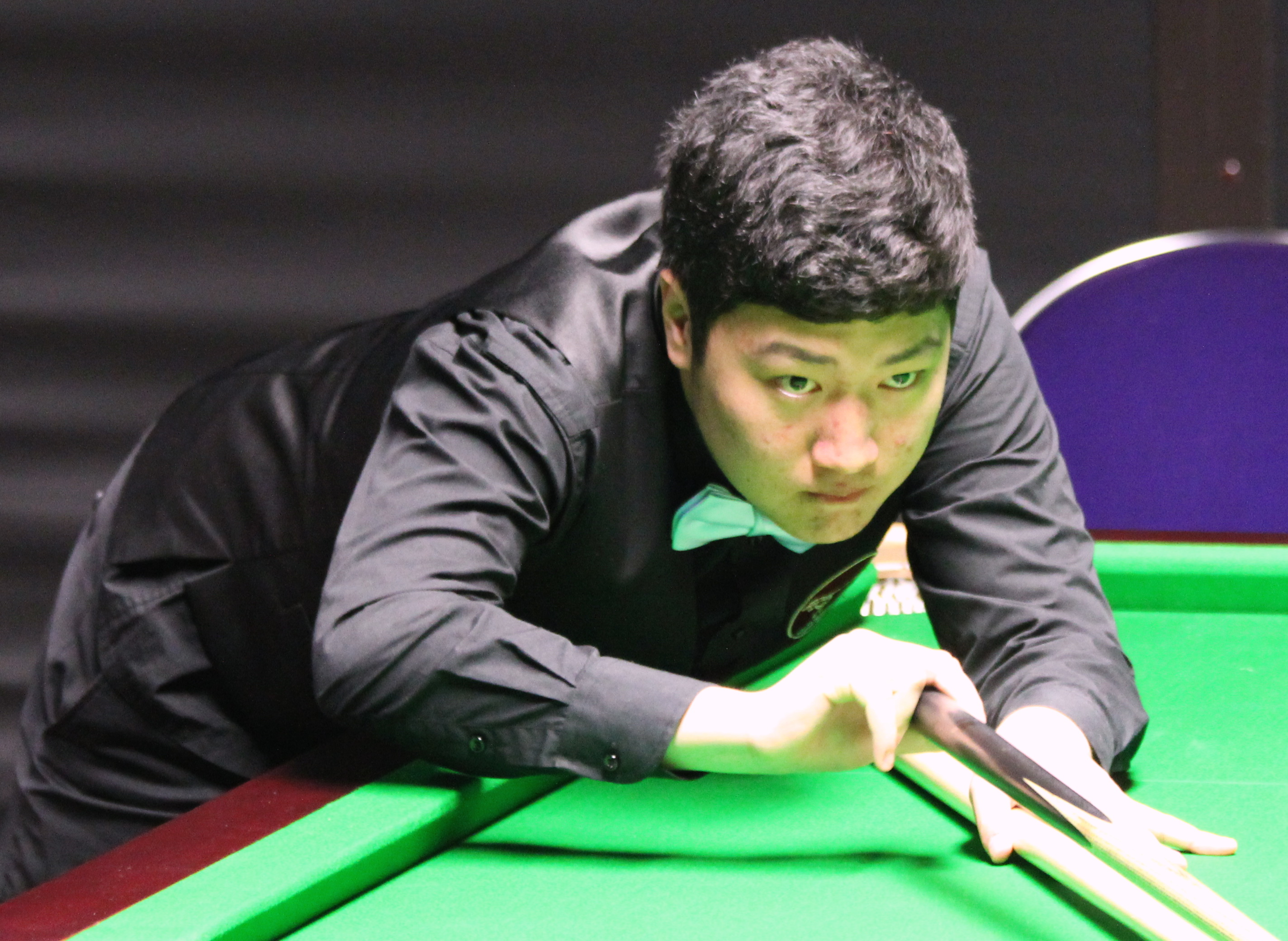
Yan Bingtao won his first ranking event after defeating Joyce in the final 5–2.

=== Final ===
The final between Yan and Joyce was played at 9 p.m. EEST (UTC+3) and refereed by Tatiana Woollaston. It was Joyce's first final, and neither player had previously won a ranking event. In the first frame, Yan required a snooker and fluked the cue ball behind the black, forcing Joyce to hit the blue ball instead of the brown, awarding Yan enough penalty points to be able to win the frame. Yan cleared the table to win the first frame. Yan won the second frame to lead 2–0, but Joyce won the third with a century break. Yan won three of the next four frames, with breaks of higher than 50. He defeated Joyce 5–2, winning the event and earning his first career ranking title. Yan became the first player born after 2000 to win a ranking event, as well as the first teenager to win a ranking event in 13 years since Ding Junhui won the 2006 Northern Ireland Trophy at age 19.

== Main draw ==
The main draw for the tournament featured 64 players. Certain players had to withdraw from the competition due to flight difficulties, and are denoted below with a bye to their opponent. A w/d indicates a withdrawn player, whilst a w/o indicates a walkover. Players listed in bold denote match winners.

**Last 64**; Best of 7 frames
bye | w/d
**Ben Woollaston (ENG)** | **w/o**
Andres Petrov (EST) | 0
**Chen Zifan (CHN)** | **4**
**Yan Bingtao (CHN)** | **4**
Rod Lawler (ENG) | 2
Bai Langning (CHN) | w/d
**Alan McManus (SCO)** | **w/o**
**Mei Xiwen (CHN)** | **w/o**
Chang Bingyu (CHN) | w/d
**Lukas Kleckers (GER)** | **4**
Zhang Anda (CHN) | 3
Ricky Walden (ENG) | 1
**Yuan Sijun (CHN)** | **4**
Mike Dunn (ENG) | 2
**Li Hang (CHN)** | **4**
Jamie O'Neill (ENG) | w/d
**Sam Craigie (ENG)** | **w/o**
**Matthew Selt (ENG)** | **4**
Lu Ning (CHN) | 2
Ali Carter (ENG) | 1
**Jak Jones (WAL)** | **4**
**Michael Holt (ENG)** | **4**
Alexander Ursenbacher (SUI) | 0
**Mark King (ENG)** | **4**
Allan Taylor (ENG) | 1
**Zhou Yuelong (CHN)** | **w/o**
Louis Heathcote (ENG) | w/d
Soheil Vahedi (IRN) | w/d
**Christopher Keogan (ENG)** | **w/o**
**Xiao Guodong (CHN)** | **w/o**
Kyren Wilson (ENG) | w/d
**Mark Selby (ENG)** | **w/o**
Hossein Vafaei (IRN) | w/d
Lee Walker (WAL) | 0
**Graeme Dott (SCO)** | **4**
**Joe Perry (ENG)** | **4**
Anthony Hamilton (ENG) | 2
Brandon Sargeant (ENG) | 1
**Stuart Carrington (ENG)** | **4**
Scott Donaldson (SCO) | 2
**Mark Joyce (ENG)** | **4**
Adam Stefanow (POL) | 1
**Liam Highfield (ENG)** | **4**
Craig Steadman (ENG) | 3
**Daniel Wells (WAL)** | **4**
Rodion Judin (LAT) | 1
**Jack Lisowski (ENG)** | **4**
**Ian Preece (WAL)** | **4**
Gerard Greene (NIR) | 2
Oliver Lines (ENG) | 0
**Thepchaiya Un-Nooh (THA)** | **4**
Luca Brecel (BEL) | 1
**Lyu Haotian (CHN)** | **4**
Joe O'Connor (ENG) | w/d
**Kurt Maflin (NOR)** | **w/o**
Kacper Filipiak (POL) | 2
**Tom Ford (ENG)** | **4**
Jackson Page (WAL) | 3
**Gary Wilson (ENG)** | **4**
David Grace (ENG) | 2
**Luo Honghao (CHN)** | **4**
James Cahill (ENG) | 3
**Mark Williams (WAL)** | **4**

**Last 32**; Best of 7 frames
(England) Ben Woollaston | 0
**(China) Chen Zifan** | **4**
**(China) Yan Bingtao** | **4**
(Scotland) Alan McManus | 3
**(China) Mei Xiwen** | **4**
(Germany) Lukas Kleckers | 1
(China) Yuan Sijun | 3
**(China) Li Hang** | **4**
(England) Sam Craigie | 3
**(England) Matthew Selt** | **4**
**(Wales) Jak Jones** | **4**
(England) Michael Holt | 3
**(England) Mark King** | **4**
(China) Zhou Yuelong | 1
**(England) Christopher Keogan** | **4**
(China) Xiao Guodong | 1
**(England) Mark Selby** | **4**
(Scotland) Graeme Dott | 3
(England) Joe Perry | 2
**(England) Stuart Carrington** | **4**
**(England) Mark Joyce** | **4**
(England) Liam Highfield | 0
(Wales) Daniel Wells | 2
**(England) Jack Lisowski** | **4**
(Wales) Ian Preece | 2
**(Thailand) Thepchaiya Un-Nooh** | **4**
(China) Lyu Haotian | 2
**(Norway) Kurt Maflin** | **4**
(England) Tom Ford | 1
**(England) Gary Wilson** | **4**
**(China) Luo Honghao** | **4**
(Wales) Mark Williams | 1

**Last 16**; Best of 7 frames
(China) Chen Zifan | 0
**(China) Yan Bingtao** | **4**
(China) Mei Xiwen | 2
**(China) Li Hang** | **4**
**(England) Matthew Selt** | **4**
(Wales) Jak Jones | 2
**(England) Mark King** | **4**
(England) Christopher Keogan | 1
(England) Mark Selby | 2
**(England) Stuart Carrington** | **4**
**(England) Mark Joyce** | **4**
(England) Jack Lisowski | 3
(Thailand) Thepchaiya Un-Nooh | 1
**(Norway) Kurt Maflin** | **4**
(England) Gary Wilson | 0
**(China) Luo Honghao** | **4**

**Quarter-finals**; Best of 7 frames
**(China) Yan Bingtao** | **4**
(China) Li Hang | 3
**(England) Matthew Selt** | **4**
(England) Mark King | 1
(England) Stuart Carrington | 1
**(England) Mark Joyce** | **4**
**(Norway) Kurt Maflin** | **4**
(China) Luo Honghao | 1

**Semi-finals**; Best of 9 frames
**(China) Yan Bingtao** | **5**
(England) Matthew Selt | 3
**(England) Mark Joyce** | **5**
(Norway) Kurt Maflin | 4

**Final**; Best of 9 frames
**(China) Yan Bingtao** | **5**
(England) Mark Joyce | 2

=== Final ===
Final: Best of 9 frames. Referee: Tatiana Woollaston. Arēna Rīga, Riga, Latvia, 28 July 2019.
| **Yan Bingtao**; China | **5**–2 | Mark Joyce; England |
**58**–57, **104**–0, 0–**133** (103), **83**–5, 17–**62**, **80**–17, **71**–45
| 66 | Highest break | **103** |
| 0 | Century breaks | **1** |

== Qualifying ==
Qualifying matches were held between 10 and 13 June 2019 at the Ponds Forge International Sports Centre in Sheffield, England. Matches involving Neil Robertson, Kishan Hirani, Mark Selby, Duane Jones, and Mark Williams, were planned to be played in Riga. All matches were best-of-seven frames.

| Neil Robertson (AUS) | w/d–w/d | Robert Milkins (ENG) |
| Ben Woollaston (ENG) | 4–2 | Mark Davis (ENG) |
| Kishan Hirani (WAL) | 0–4 | Andres Petrov (EST) |
| Chen Zifan (CHN) | 4–2 | Michael Georgiou (CYP) |
| Yan Bingtao (CHN) | 4–2 | Anthony McGill (SCO) |
| Rod Lawler (ENG) | 4–2 | Yang Qingtian (CHN) |
| Tian Pengfei (CHN) | w/d–w/o | Bai Langning (CHN) |
| Alan McManus (SCO) | 4–1 | Billy Joe Castle (ENG) |
| Mei Xiwen (CHN) | 4–0 | Paul Davison (ENG) |
| Chang Bingyu (CHN) | 4–2 | Ian Burns (ENG) |
| Riley Parsons (ENG) | 2–4 | Lukas Kleckers (GER) |
| Shaun Murphy (ENG) | 3–4 | Zhang Anda (CHN) |
| Ricky Walden (ENG) | 4–1 | Si Jiahui (CHN) |
| Yuan Sijun (CHN) | 4–2 | Noppon Saengkham (THA) |
| Mitchell Mann (ENG) | 0–4 | Mike Dunn (ENG) |
| Stuart Bingham (ENG) | 1–4 | Li Hang (CHN) |
| Barry Hawkins (ENG) | 1–4 | Jamie O'Neill (ENG) |
| Long Zehuang (CHN) | 2–4 | Sam Craigie (ENG) |
| Jimmy Robertson (ENG) | 2–4 | Matthew Selt (ENG) |
| Lu Ning (CHN) | 4–1 | Martin O'Donnell (ENG) |
| Ali Carter (ENG) | 4–1 | Xu Si (CHN) |
| Thor Chuan Leong (MYS) | 1–4 | Jak Jones (WAL) |
| Ross Bulman (IRL) | 1–4 | Michael Holt (ENG) |
| Hamza Akbar (PAK) | 1–4 | Alexander Ursenbacher (SUI) |
| Mark King (ENG) | 4–1 | Martin Gould (ENG) |
| Lei Peifan (CHN) | 1–4 | Allan Taylor (ENG) |
| Zhou Yuelong (CHN) | w/o–w/d | Chen Feilong (CHN) |
| Ryan Day (WAL) | 3–4 | Louis Heathcote (ENG) |
| Soheil Vahedi (IRN) | 4–0 | Andreas Ploner (AUT) |
| Andy Lee (HKG) | 3–4 | Christopher Keogan (ENG) |
| Chae Ross (ENG) | 1–4 | Xiao Guodong (CHN) |
| Kyren Wilson (ENG) | 4–1 | Fergal O'Brien (IRL) |

| Mark Selby (ENG) | w/o–w/d | Harvey Chandler (ENG) |
| Hossein Vafaei (IRN) | w/o–w/d | Zhang Jiankang (CHN) |
| Lee Walker (WAL) | 4–1 | Peter Lines (ENG) |
| Robbie Williams (ENG) | 3–4 | Graeme Dott (SCO) |
| Joe Perry (ENG) | 4–2 | Fan Zhengyi (CHN) |
| Andrew Pagett (WAL) | 1–4 | Anthony Hamilton (ENG) |
| Brandon Sargeant (ENG) | 4–2 | Ashley Carty (ENG) |
| Stuart Carrington (ENG) | 4–0 | Andrew Higginson (ENG) |
| Scott Donaldson (SCO) | 4–2 | Fraser Patrick (SCO) |
| Sam Baird (ENG) | 1–4 | Mark Joyce (ENG) |
| Adam Stefanow (POL) | 4–0 | Michael White (WAL) |
| Stephen Maguire (SCO) | 2–4 | Liam Highfield (ENG) |
| Craig Steadman (ENG) | 4–3 | Dominic Dale (WAL) |
| Elliot Slessor (ENG) | 1–4 | Daniel Wells (WAL) |
| Duane Jones (WAL) | w/d–w/o | Rodion Judin (LAT) |
| Jack Lisowski (ENG) | 4–2 | David Lilley (ENG) |
| David Gilbert (ENG) | 3–4 | Ian Preece (WAL) |
| John Astley (ENG) | 2–4 | Gerard Greene (NIR) |
| Oliver Lines (ENG) | 4–1 | Shane Castle (ENG) |
| Eden Sharav (ISR) | 3–4 | Thepchaiya Un-Nooh (THA) |
| Luca Brecel (BEL) | 4–0 | Andy Hicks (ENG) |
| Jamie Clarke (WAL) | 1–4 | Lyu Haotian (CHN) |
| Joe O'Connor (ENG) | 4–3 | Peter Ebdon (ENG) |
| Simon Lichtenberg (GER) | 1–4 | Kurt Maflin (NOR) |
| Kacper Filipiak (POL) | 4–3 | Zhao Xintong (CHN) |
| Tom Ford (ENG) | 4–0 | Alex Borg (MLT) |
| Jackson Page (WAL) | 4–0 | Hammad Miah (ENG) |
| Gary Wilson (ENG) | 4–3 | Chris Wakelin (ENG) |
| Alfie Burden (ENG) | 2–4 | David Grace (ENG) |
| Barry Pinches (ENG) | 2–4 | Luo Honghao (CHN) |
| Jimmy White (ENG) | 0–4 | James Cahill (ENG) |
| Mark Williams (WAL) | 4–1 | Jordan Brown (NIR) |

== Century breaks ==
=== Televised stage centuries ===
A total of 19 centuries were made during the event. Jack Lisowski scored a 145, the highest break of the event. Mark Williams made his break of 137 in a held over match.

- 145, 140, 119 – Jack Lisowski
- 143 – Graeme Dott
- 137 – Liam Highfield
- 137 – Mark Williams
- 127 – Daniel Wells
- 126, 112, 109, 103 – Mark Joyce
- 120 – Mei Xiwen
- 112 – Kurt Maflin
- 110 – Gary Wilson
- 109, 104 – Tom Ford
- 106 – Ricky Walden
- 106 – Rod Lawler
- 101 – Yan Bingtao

=== Qualifying stage centuries ===
During the pre-tournament qualification, 23 centuries were made. Dominic Dale scores the highest of these, with a break of 141.

- 141 – Dominic Dale
- 138 – Lu Ning
- 136 – Yuan Sijun
- 132, 112 – Thepchaiya Un-Nooh
- 131 – David Grace
- 131 – Oliver Lines
- 131 – Ricky Walden
- 129 – Anthony Hamilton
- 128, 109 – Alan McManus
- 125 – Michael Holt
- 124 – Scott Donaldson
- 120, 101 – Jamie O'Neill
- 119 – Mei Xiwen
- 112 – Jackson Page
- 112 – Yang Qingtian
- 109 – Chris Wakelin
- 109 – Riley Parsons
- 105 – Kurt Maflin
- 103 – Joe O'Connor
- 101 – Ian Burns
