= List of snooker players investigated for match-fixing =

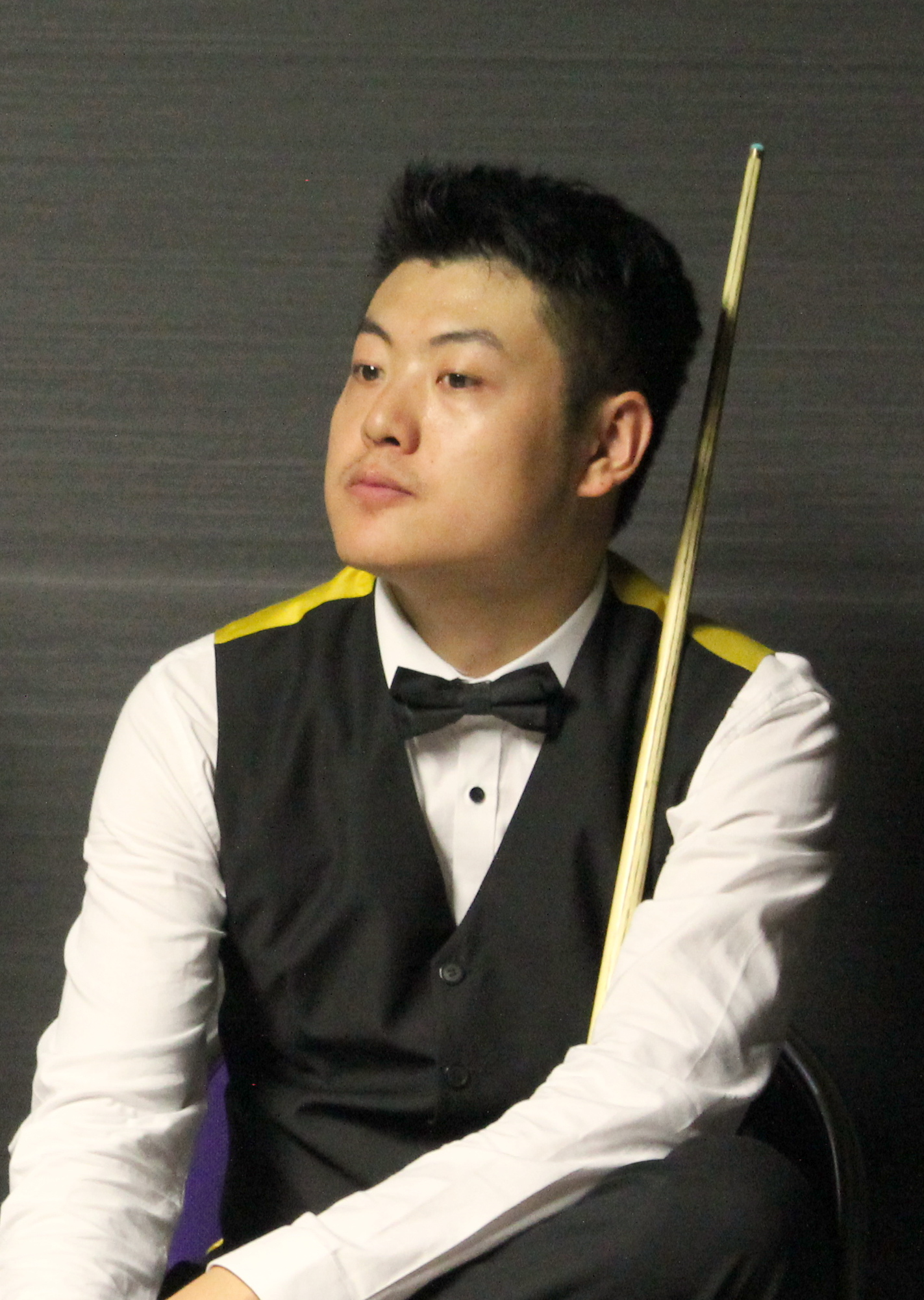
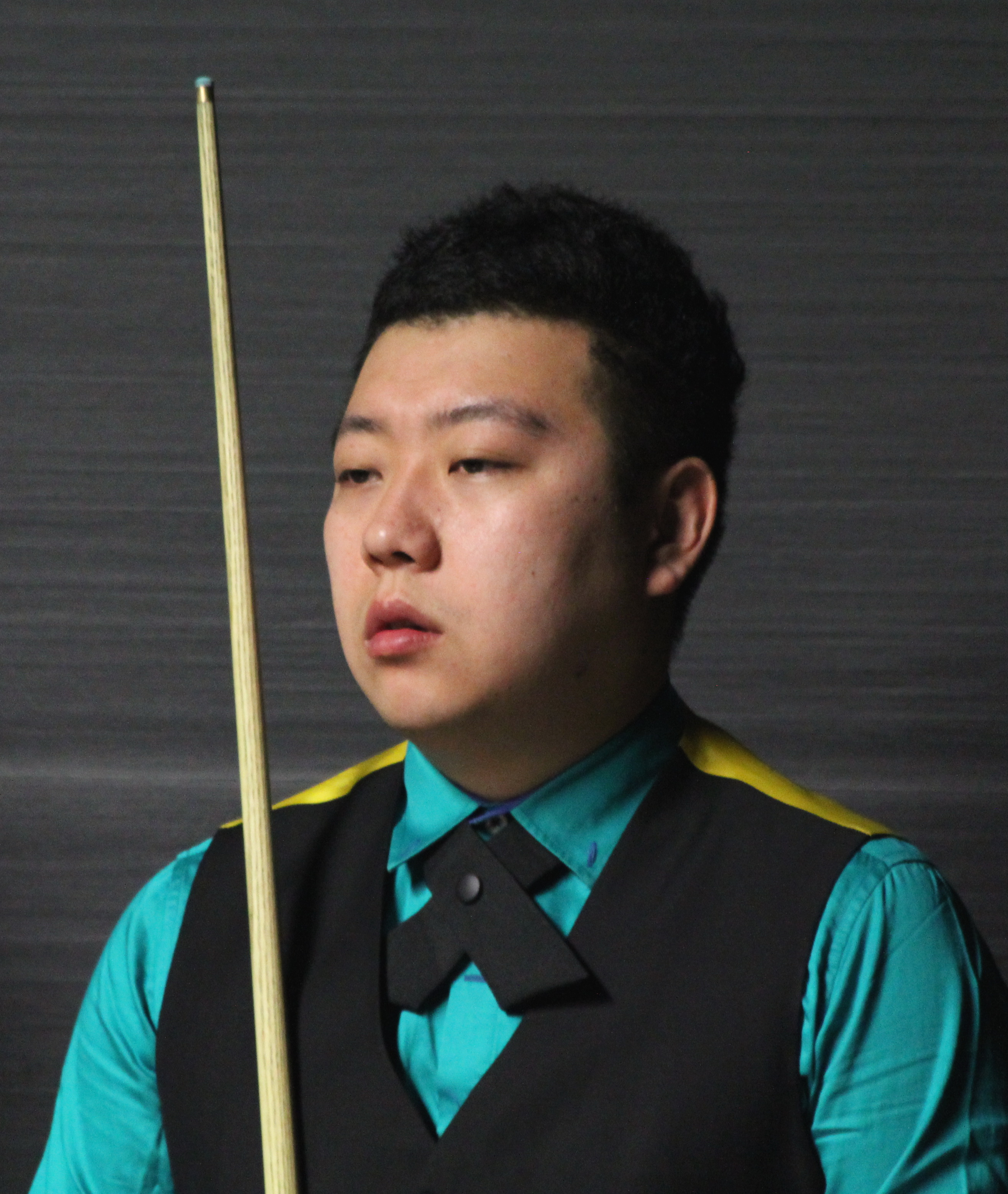
Liang Wenbo (left) and Li Hang (right) received lifetime bans for match-fixing, making them the only individuals to have received such a sentence for match-fixing.

Snooker has seen corruption allegations since its inception as a professional sport. Professional player and commentator Willie Thorne considered match-fixing endemic to snooker, noting that he himself was offered a bribe to throw a match.

The earliest known case of corruption in the game involved Joe Davis, pioneer of the professional sport and winner of the first 15 world championships, who is believed to have "carried" weaker opponents in multi-session matches to maximise gate revenue. In 1968, The Sunday Times published an article titled "Great TV Snooker Frame-up", which exposed the fixing of non-tournament televised matches for "the artificial production of climaxes". Players Ray Edmonds, John Spencer, Gary Owen and Fred Davis recounted how there had been an understanding that if they were playing a televised match, end with a deciding frame, and that they would play in a way to ensure dramatic tension. Davis said that he regarded these matches as "five frames of comedy: I hate taking part in something that's not genuine".

Players have sometimes been coerced into fixing results. Thai players in particular have been targeted by cartels. James Wattana once received a death threat as part of a match-fixing attempt, while Thanawat Thirapongpaiboon was the victim of a firebomb attack on his Rotherham home after the governing body opened an investigation into him and fellow Thai player Passakorn Suwannawat.

Despite the number of players investigated and/or banned for being found to have participated in match-fixing, it has long been difficult to prove that a match was fixed. Only four arrests have taken place in the sport's history—Silvino Francisco, Stephen Lee and Scottish practice partners Stephen Maguire and Jamie Burnett—but no criminal prosecution has ever been brought. In 2022, the sport was rocked by the biggest scandal in its history when a match-fixing ring was unmasked, which led to ten Chinese players—Liang Wenbo, Li Hang, Lu Ning, Yan Bingtao, Zhao Xintong, Zhao Jianbo, Chang Bingyu, Bai Langning, Chen Zifan and Zhang Jiankang—being banned for match-fixing offences. Ringleaders Liang and Li both received lifetime bans from the sport—the first time that a professional player had been permanently forbidden from participating in sanctioned snooker matches. The only other players the World Professional Billiards and Snooker Association (WPBSA) have successfully prosecuted for match-fixing are Stephen Lee, Leo Fernandez, Yu Delu, Cao Yupeng, David John, Thanawat Tirapongpaiboon, Mark King and amateur players John Sutton and Simon Blackwell. Four other players—Quinten Hann, John Higgins, Joe Jogia, and Jamie Jones—have served bans on match-fixing related charges.

== Players investigated for match-fixing ==
| Name | Match | | | | Outcome | Ref |
| Name | Event | Date | Opponent | Score | Outcome | Ref |
|---|---|---|---|---|---|---|
| Silvino Francisco | Masters; Last 16 | 29 January 1986 | Tony Knowles | 1–5 | Arrested, but later released without charge. | |
| Silvino Francisco | Masters; Last 16 | 23 January 1989 | Terry Griffiths | 1–5 | Arrested, but later released without charge. | |
| Peter Francisco | World Championship; Last 32 | 15–16 April 1995 | Jimmy White | 2–10 | Found guilty of bringing the game into disrepute, and was banned for five years. Cleared of match-fixing. | |
| Quinten Hann | China Open; Last 32 | 31 March 2005 | Ken Doherty | 2–5 | Hann was found in breach of rule 2.8, which states "a member shall not directly or indirectly solicit, attempt to solicit or accept any payment or any form of remuneration of benefit in exchange for influencing the outcome of any game of snooker or billiards." He was banned for eight years in 2006 and fined £10,000. | |
| Stephen Lee | Malta Cup; League stage | 8 February 2008 | Joe Swail | 5–1 | WPBSA concluded that the match was not fixed. | (Note: At Stephen Lee's original hearing, £40,000 in costs were awarded against him. This was increased to £75,000 after Lee unsuccessfully appealed, and he incurred a further £30,000 in costs after an earlier appeals panel was forced to recuse itself after finding him to be an unreliable witness. The remainder of his appeal saw a further £20,000 awarded against him, bringing the total amount to £125,000.) |
| Stephen Lee | Malta Cup; League stage | 4 February 2008 | Neil Robertson | 1–5 | Lee was found guilty of breaching Rule 2.9 of the WPBSA Members Rule and Regulations by accepting payment to influence the outcome of a match. The case was heard by Sports Resolutions UK from 9–11 September 2013. Lee received a twelve-year ban, which was back-dated to the beginning of his suspension on 12 October 2012 and ran until 12 October 2024. Lee also incurred £125,000 in costs awarded against him after an unsuccessful appeal. | (Note: At Stephen Lee's original hearing, £40,000 in costs were awarded against him. This was increased to £75,000 after Lee unsuccessfully appealed, and he incurred a further £30,000 in costs after an earlier appeals panel was forced to recuse itself after finding him to be an unreliable witness. The remainder of his appeal saw a further £20,000 awarded against him, bringing the total amount to £125,000.) |
| Stephen Lee | Malta Cup; League stage | 5 February 2008 | Ken Doherty | 2–4 | Lee was found guilty of breaching Rule 2.9 of the WPBSA Members Rule and Regulations by accepting payment to influence the outcome of a match. The case was heard by Sports Resolutions UK from 9–11 September 2013. Lee received a twelve-year ban, which was back-dated to the beginning of his suspension on 12 October 2012 and ran until 12 October 2024. Lee also incurred £125,000 in costs awarded against him after an unsuccessful appeal. | (Note: At Stephen Lee's original hearing, £40,000 in costs were awarded against him. This was increased to £75,000 after Lee unsuccessfully appealed, and he incurred a further £30,000 in costs after an earlier appeals panel was forced to recuse itself after finding him to be an unreliable witness. The remainder of his appeal saw a further £20,000 awarded against him, bringing the total amount to £125,000.) |
| Stephen Lee | Malta Cup; League stage | 7 February 2008 | Marco Fu | 1–5 | Lee was found guilty of breaching Rule 2.9 of the WPBSA Members Rule and Regulations by accepting payment to influence the outcome of a match. The case was heard by Sports Resolutions UK from 9–11 September 2013. Lee received a twelve-year ban, which was back-dated to the beginning of his suspension on 12 October 2012 and ran until 12 October 2024. Lee also incurred £125,000 in costs awarded against him after an unsuccessful appeal. | (Note: At Stephen Lee's original hearing, £40,000 in costs were awarded against him. This was increased to £75,000 after Lee unsuccessfully appealed, and he incurred a further £30,000 in costs after an earlier appeals panel was forced to recuse itself after finding him to be an unreliable witness. The remainder of his appeal saw a further £20,000 awarded against him, bringing the total amount to £125,000.) |
| Stephen Lee | UK Championship | 13–14 December 2008; Round 1 | Stephen Hendry | 9–7 | Lee was found guilty of breaching Rule 2.9 of the WPBSA Members Rule and Regulations by accepting payment to influence the outcome of a match. The case was heard by Sports Resolutions UK from 9–11 September 2013. Lee received a twelve-year ban, which was back-dated to the beginning of his suspension on 12 October 2012 and ran until 12 October 2024. Lee also incurred £125,000 in costs awarded against him after an unsuccessful appeal. | (Note: At Stephen Lee's original hearing, £40,000 in costs were awarded against him. This was increased to £75,000 after Lee unsuccessfully appealed, and he incurred a further £30,000 in costs after an earlier appeals panel was forced to recuse itself after finding him to be an unreliable witness. The remainder of his appeal saw a further £20,000 awarded against him, bringing the total amount to £125,000.) |
| Stephen Lee | UK Championship | 15–16 December 2008; Round 2 | Mark King | 9–5 | Lee was found guilty of breaching Rule 2.9 of the WPBSA Members Rule and Regulations by accepting payment to influence the outcome of a match. The case was heard by Sports Resolutions UK from 9–11 September 2013. Lee received a twelve-year ban, which was back-dated to the beginning of his suspension on 12 October 2012 and ran until 12 October 2024. Lee also incurred £125,000 in costs awarded against him after an unsuccessful appeal. | (Note: At Stephen Lee's original hearing, £40,000 in costs were awarded against him. This was increased to £75,000 after Lee unsuccessfully appealed, and he incurred a further £30,000 in costs after an earlier appeals panel was forced to recuse itself after finding him to be an unreliable witness. The remainder of his appeal saw a further £20,000 awarded against him, bringing the total amount to £125,000.) |
| Stephen Lee | China Open; Last 32 | 1 April 2009 | Mark Selby | 1–5 | Lee was found guilty of breaching Rule 2.9 of the WPBSA Members Rule and Regulations by accepting payment to influence the outcome of a match. The case was heard by Sports Resolutions UK from 9–11 September 2013. Lee received a twelve-year ban, which was back-dated to the beginning of his suspension on 12 October 2012 and ran until 12 October 2024. Lee also incurred £125,000 in costs awarded against him after an unsuccessful appeal. | (Note: At Stephen Lee's original hearing, £40,000 in costs were awarded against him. This was increased to £75,000 after Lee unsuccessfully appealed, and he incurred a further £30,000 in costs after an earlier appeals panel was forced to recuse itself after finding him to be an unreliable witness. The remainder of his appeal saw a further £20,000 awarded against him, bringing the total amount to £125,000.) |
| Stephen Lee | World Championship; Last 32 | 22 April 2009 | Ryan Day | 4–10 | Lee was found guilty of breaching Rule 2.9 of the WPBSA Members Rule and Regulations by accepting payment to influence the outcome of a match. The case was heard by Sports Resolutions UK from 9–11 September 2013. Lee received a twelve-year ban, which was back-dated to the beginning of his suspension on 12 October 2012 and ran until 12 October 2024. Lee also incurred £125,000 in costs awarded against him after an unsuccessful appeal. | (Note: At Stephen Lee's original hearing, £40,000 in costs were awarded against him. This was increased to £75,000 after Lee unsuccessfully appealed, and he incurred a further £30,000 in costs after an earlier appeals panel was forced to recuse itself after finding him to be an unreliable witness. The remainder of his appeal saw a further £20,000 awarded against him, bringing the total amount to £125,000.) |
| Peter Ebdon | Northern Ireland Trophy; Last 32 | 26 August 2008 | Liang Wenbo | 0–5 | Investigated by the Gambling Commission over suspicious betting patterns. | |
| Jamie Burnett | UK Championship; Last 32 | 15 December 2008 | Stephen Maguire | 3–9 | Arrested, but later released without charge. | |
| Stephen Maguire | UK Championship; Last 32 | 15 December 2008 | Jamie Burnett | 9–3 | Arrested, but later released without charge. | |
| Stephen Lee | UK Championship | 5–8 December 2009 | Unknown | | Arrested and charged. Charges later dropped. | |
| John Higgins | World Series of Snooker | 2010 | Matches did not go ahead | | Found guilty of 'giving the impression' he would breach betting rules, and of failing to report the approach. Higgins was banned for six months, fined £75,000 and ordered to pay £10,000 in costs. | |
| Jimmy Michie | Shoot-Out; Round 1 | 28 January 2011 | Marcus Campbell | 21–32 (points) | Investigated by the WPBSA over suspicious betting patterns, but no charges were brought. | |
| Marcus Campbell | Shoot-Out; Round 1 | 28 January 2011 | Jimmy Michie | 32–21 (points) | Investigated by the WPBSA over suspicious betting patterns, but no charges were brought. | |
| Joe Jogia | Shoot-Out; Round 1 | 28 January 2012 | Matthew Selt | Jogia withdrew | Following an investigation into suspicious betting patterns Jogia was found guilty of breaching Rule 2.1.4.1, which states "It shall be a breach of these rules for a member to engage in any other conduct that is corrupt or fraudulent, or creates an actual or apparent conflict of interest for the member, or otherwise risks impairing public confidence in the integrity and/or the honest and orderly conduct of the Tour and/or any Tournament or Match." Jogia was banned for two years (spanning the 2012–13 and 2013–14 seasons) and ordered to pay £2,000 in costs. | |
| Thepchaiya Un-Nooh | PTC – Event 3 Last 128 | 8 September 2012 | Steve Davis | 0–4 | Investigated by the WPBSA over unusual betting patterns, but no charges were brought. | |
| Stephen Lee | Premier League; League stage | 11 October 2012 | John Higgins | 2–4 | Lee was suspended and investigated by the WPBSA and the Gambling Commission over suspicious betting patterns, but no charges were brought. | |
| Thanawat Thirapongpaiboon | Australian Open; Qualifying round 2 | 1 June 2013 | Noppon Saengkham | 1–5 | The tie between Thanawat and Ross Muir at the Shanghai Masters in 2013 was investigated by the WPBSA and the Gambling Commission over unusual betting patterns, but in January 2014 the WPBSA closed the investigation after they found no evidence to link either player to the suspicious betting activity. The investigation into Thanawat was reopened in August 2015, following suspicious betting patterns regarding his match against Martin O'Donnell at the Paul Hunter Classic. Following a third investigation in 2022, Thanawat pleaded guilty to breaching Rule 2.1.2.1 by fixing the outcomes of six matches between 2013 and 2015. Thanawat was banned for nine years, reduced to six for his "guilty" plea. Of that period, he served two years and nine months of his ban unconditionally, with the remaining three years and three months suspended, provided he assisted the WPBSA in its anti-corruption work. His ban ran from 15th June 2022 until 14th March 2025, provided he complied with the terms of his sentence. He was ordered to pay £1,925 towards the WPBSA costs. | |
| Thanawat Thirapongpaiboon | Shanghai Masters; Qualifying round 1 | 7 August 2013 | Ross Muir | 0–5 | | |
| Thanawat Thirapongpaiboon | China Open; Qualifying round 1 | 16 February 2014 | Ding Junhui | 0–5 | | |
| Thanawat Thirapongpaiboon | Welsh Open; Last 128 | 19 February 2014 | Martin Gould | 0–4 | | |
| Thanawat Thirapongpaiboon | UK Championship; Last 128 | 25 November 2014 | Stuart Bingham | 0–6 | | |
| Thanawat Thirapongpaiboon | Paul Hunter Classic; Last 128 | 28 August 2015 | Martin O'Donnell | 2–4 | | |
| Passakorn Suwannawat | Shanghai Masters; Qualifying round 1 | 7 August 2013 | Mohamed Khairy | 4–5 | Investigated by the WPBSA and the Gambling Commission over unusual betting patterns but no charges were brought. | |
| John Sutton | International Championship; Qualifying round | 24 September 2014 | Jamie Burnett | 0–6 | Sutton was found guilty by the WPBSA Disciplinary Committee of violating sections 2.1.2.1 and 2.1.3.1 of its Members Rules, in relation to match-fixing and misuse of inside information for betting purposes. Sutton received a six-year ban, which was back-dated to the beginning of his suspension on 9 February 2015, and was ordered to pay £5,000 in costs. | |
| Lu Ning | European Tour – Event 5 Last 128 | 13 December 2014 | Oliver Lines | 2–4 | Further information: § Chinese match-fixing ring Along with two other unknown matches in the 2014–15 snooker season, an independent tribunal found Lu guilty of fixing the results of four matches in total, in breach of Rules 2.1.2.1 and 2.2 of the WPBSA Members Rule and Regulations. He was also found guilty of betting on matches. Lu was sentenced to a ban of five years and four months, reduced from eight years for his guilty plea, which will run until 6 April 2028. He was also ordered to pay £7,500 towards costs. His matches in the 2014–15 season are the earliest recorded matches to be fixed by a member of the Chinese match-fixing ring. | |
| Lu Ning | European Masters; Qualifying | 23 July 2022 | Robert Milkins | 0–5 | | |
| Yu Delu | Indian Open; Qualifying round | 12 February 2015 | Martin McCrudden | 4–3 | Yu Delu was found guilty of breaching Rule 2.1.2.1 of the WPBSA Members Rule and Regulations by accepting payment to fix the outcome of a match. Yu admitted breaches of WPBSA Members Rules before a three-person independent tribunal chaired by David Casement QC held on 2 November 2018, following an investigation by the WPBSA Integrity Unit working with Sportradar Integrity Services and the UK Gambling Commission. Yu was sentenced to a twelve-year ban reduced to ten years and nine months, which is back-dated to the beginning of his suspension on 25 May 2018 and will run until 24 February 2029. Yu was also ordered to pay £20,823.80 in costs. | |
| Yu Delu | Paul Hunter Classic; Last 128 | 29 August 2015 | Dominic Dale | 1–4 | | |
| Yu Delu | Welsh Open; Last 128 | 15 February 2016 | Ian Glover | 4–3 | | |
| Yu Delu | European Masters; Qualifying round | 4 August 2017 | Michael Georgiou | 1–4 | | |
| Yu Delu | Shanghai Masters; Last 32 | 15 November 2017 | Kurt Maflin | 3–5 | | |
| Cao Yupeng | Welsh Open; Last 128 | 15 February 2016 | Ali Carter | 1–4 | Cao Yupeng was found guilty of breaching Rule 2.1.2.1 of the WPBSA Members Rule and Regulations by accepting payment to fix the outcome of a match. Cao admitted breaches of WPBSA Members Rules before a three-person independent tribunal chaired by David Casement QC held on 21 September 2018, following an investigation by the WPBSA Integrity Unit working with Sportradar Integrity Services and the UK Gambling Commission. Cao was sentenced to an eight-year ban reduced to six, which was back-dated to the beginning of his suspension on 25 May 2018 and ran until 24 November 2020. The remaining period of the ban was suspended provided Cao assisted the WPBSA in its anti-corruption work. He was also ordered to pay £15,558 in costs. Cao returned to the main tour in the 2021–22 season. | |
| Cao Yupeng | Indian Open; Qualifying round | 30 May 2016 | Stuart Bingham | 0–4 | | |
| Cao Yupeng | UK Championship; Last 128 | 24 November 2016 | Stephen Maguire | 1–6 | | |
| Leo Fernandez | World Championship; Qualifying round 1 | 6 April 2016 | Gary Wilson | 4–10 | Fernandez was found guilty by the WPBSA Disciplinary Committee of violating section 2.1.2.1 of its Members Rules, which prohibits its members "to fix or contrive, or to be a party to any effort to fix or contrive, the result, score, progress, conduct or any other aspect of the Tour and/or any Tournament or Match", in relation to suspicious betting on who would commit the first foul in the first frame of the match. Fernandez admitted his involvement in delivering the foul shot in the first frame of the match in question for other persons to make money through betting. He was banned from the sport for 15 months, which ran from 27 May 2016—when the interim suspension pending the investigation too effect—until 27 August 2017, and was ordered to pay £2,000 in costs. As a condition of his sentence Fernandez had to assist the WPBSA in its anti-corruption education work. | |
| Yan Bingtao | Paul Hunter Classic; Last 16 | 28 August 2016 | Dominic Dale | 1–4 | Further information: § Chinese match-fixing ring An independent tribunal found Yan guilty of fixing the results of four matches in total, in breach of Rules 2.1.2.1 and 2.2 of the WPBSA Members Rule and Regulations. He was also found guilty of betting on matches. Yan was sentenced to a ban of five years, reduced from seven and a half years for his guilty plea, which will run until 11 December 2027. He was also ordered to pay £7,500 towards costs. | |
| Yan Bingtao | Welsh Open; Last 32 | 3 March 2022 | Ricky Walden | 2–4 | Further information: § Chinese match-fixing ring An independent tribunal found Yan guilty of fixing the results of four matches in total, in breach of Rules 2.1.2.1 and 2.2 of the WPBSA Members Rule and Regulations. He was also found guilty of betting on matches. Yan was sentenced to a ban of five years, reduced from seven and a half years for his guilty plea, which will run until 11 December 2027. He was also ordered to pay £7,500 towards costs. | |
| Yan Bingtao | Turkish Masters; Last 16 | 11 March 2022 | Oliver Lines | 4–5 | Further information: § Chinese match-fixing ring An independent tribunal found Yan guilty of fixing the results of four matches in total, in breach of Rules 2.1.2.1 and 2.2 of the WPBSA Members Rule and Regulations. He was also found guilty of betting on matches. Yan was sentenced to a ban of five years, reduced from seven and a half years for his guilty plea, which will run until 11 December 2027. He was also ordered to pay £7,500 towards costs. | |
| Yan Bingtao | British Open; Last 32 | 29 September 2022 | Jordan Brown | 3–4 | Further information: § Chinese match-fixing ring An independent tribunal found Yan guilty of fixing the results of four matches in total, in breach of Rules 2.1.2.1 and 2.2 of the WPBSA Members Rule and Regulations. He was also found guilty of betting on matches. Yan was sentenced to a ban of five years, reduced from seven and a half years for his guilty plea, which will run until 11 December 2027. He was also ordered to pay £7,500 towards costs. | |
| Zhao Xintong | — | — | — | — | Further information: § Chinese match-fixing ring An independent tribunal found Zhao in breach of Rules 2.1.2.1 and 2.2 of the WPBSA Members Rule and Regulations. Zhao was a party to fixing the results of two matches in which Yan Bingtao played on 3 March and 11 March 2022 at the Welsh Open and Turkish Masters respectively (see above). He was also found guilty of betting on matches. The tribunal noted that Zhao "did not himself fix any match" and that his involvement was "limited to placing bets for Yan". Zhao was sentenced to a ban of one year and eight months, reduced from two and a half years for his guilty plea, which ran until 1 September 2024. He was also ordered to pay £7,500 towards costs. He returned to competition on the Q Tour on 20 September 2024, but was unable to compete in Chinese events until July 2025 due to the Chinese Billiards and Snooker Association imposing a longer ban. | |
| David John | International Championship; Qualifying round | 29 September 2016 | Graeme Dott | 1–6 | David John was found guilty of breaching Rule 2.1.2.1 of the WPBSA Members Rule and Regulations by accepting payment to fix the outcome of a match. John admitted breaches of WPBSA Members Rules following an investigation by the WPBSA Integrity Unit supported by Sportradar and the UK Gambling Commission SBIU. The case against John was heard on 11 January 2019 by the WPBSA Disciplinary Committee. John was sentenced to a seven-year ban reduced to five years and seven months, which was back-dated to the beginning of his suspension on 22 May 2018 and ran until 21 December 2023. John was also ordered to pay £17,000 in costs. | |
| David John | China Open; Qualifying round | 24 January 2017 | Joe Perry | 0–5 | | |
| Jamie Jones | International Championship; Qualifying round | 29 September 2016 | David John | 1 | Jamie Jones was found guilty of breaching Rule 4.2 of the WPBSA Members Rule and Regulations by failing to report the approach to David John in the manipulation of the outcome of the match between John and Graeme Dott at the International Championship Qualifiers in 2016. Jones admitted breaches of WPBSA Members Rules following an investigation by the WPBSA Integrity Unit supported by Sportradar and the UK Gambling Commission SBIU. The case against Jones was heard on 11 January 2019 by the WPBSA Disciplinary Committee. Jones was sentenced to a sixteen-month ban reduced to twelve months, which was back-dated to the beginning of his suspension on 11 October 2018 and ran until 10 October 2019. Jones was also ordered to pay £9,000 in costs. He returned to the snooker main tour in the 2020–21 season. | |
| Jamie Jones | International Championship; Qualifying round | 29 September 2016 | Graeme Dott | 6 | | |
| Simon Blackwell | Open Series Event 13 (EPSB) | 27 March 2022 | Unknown | | A WPBSA disciplinary committee found Blackwell guilty of offering to pay an opponent £200 to ensure that he would win two the four frames he needed to finish in the four of the series, facilitating free entry to Q School. He was found in breach of Rules 2.1.2.1 (seeking to fix a result), 2.1.2.2 (accepting/offering financial inducement to fix a result), and 2.1.2.4 (inducing another WSA member to fix a match). Blackwell was banned for eighteen months, which was back-dated from the date of his suspension on 14 April 2022 and ran until 15 October 2023. He was also ordered to pay £1,400 in costs. | |
| Zhang Jiankang | European Masters; Qualifying | 22 July 2022 | Jack Lisowski | 1–5 | Further information: § Chinese match-fixing ring An independent tribunal found Zhang guilty of fixing the result of his match against Jack Lisowski at the European Masters, in breach of Rules 2.1.2.1 and 2.2 of the WPBSA Members Rule and Regulations. He was also found guilty of betting on matches. Zhang was sentenced to a ban of two years and eleven months, reduced from four years and five months for his guilty plea, which ran until 1 December 2025. He was also ordered to pay £7,500 towards costs. | |
| Chen Zifan | European Masters; Qualifying | 24 July 2022 | Aaron Hill | 1–5 | Further information: § Chinese match-fixing ring Despite plans to fix the results of three matches being abandoned in two cases, an independent tribunal found Chen guilty of fixing or conspiring to fix the results of three matches in total, in breach of Rules 2.1.2.1 and 2.2 of the WPBSA Members Rule and Regulations. Chen was sentenced to a ban of five years, reduced from seven and a half years for his guilty plea, which will run until 20 December 2027. He was also ordered to pay £7,500 towards costs. | |
| Chen Zifan | British Open; Last 32 | 9 August 2022 | Mink Nutcharut | 4–2 | | |
| Chen Zifan | Northern Ireland Open; Qualifying | 23 August 2022 | Ng On-yee | 4–1 | | |
| Zhao Jianbo | Northern Ireland Open; Qualifying | 26 August 2022 | Aaron Hill | 0–4 | Further information: § Chinese match-fixing ring An independent tribunal found Zhao guilty of fixing the result of his match against Aaron Hill at the Northern Ireland Open, in breach of Rules 2.1.2.1 and 2.2 of the WPBSA Members Rule and Regulations. He was also found guilty of betting on matches. Zhao was sentenced to a ban of two years and four months, reduced from three years and six months for his guilty plea, which ran until 7 April 2025. He was also ordered to pay £7,500 towards costs. | |
| Bai Langning | British Open; Qualifying | 26 September 2022 | Zhao Xintong | 1–4 | Further information: § Chinese match-fixing ring Even though Bai backed out of the plan to fix the result of his match at the British Open against Zhao Xintong, an independent tribunal found Chen guilty of conspiring to fix the result of one match, in breach of Rules 2.1.2.1 and 2.2 of the WPBSA Members Rule and Regulations. Bai was sentenced to a ban of two years and eight months, reduced from four years for his guilty plea, which ran until 6 August 2025. He was also ordered to pay £7,500 | |
| Chang Bingyu | British Open; Last 32 | 28 September 2022 | Jamie Jones | 1–4 | Further information: § Chinese match-fixing ring An independent tribunal found Chang guilty of fixing the result of his match against Jamie Jones at the British Open, in breach of Rules 2.1.2.1 and 2.2 of the WPBSA Members Rule and Regulations. He was also found guilty of betting on matches. Chang was sentenced to a ban of two years, reduced from three for his guilty plea, which will run until 7 December 2024. He was also ordered to pay £7,500 towards costs. | |
| Liang Wenbo | — | — | — | — | Further information: § Chinese match-fixing ring An independent tribunal found Liang guilty of fixing or conspiring to fix the results of five matches in total, in breach of Rules 2.1.2.1 and 2.2 of the WPBSA Members Rule and Regulations, and of inducing players to fix the results of nine matches, in violation of Rule 2.1.2.4. He was also found guilty of betting on matches, threatening Chang Bingyu, destroying evidence, and not cooperating with the investigation. Liang received a lifetime ban and was ordered to pay £43,000 towards costs. | |
| Li Hang | — | — | — | — | Further information: § Chinese match-fixing ring An independent tribunal found Li guilty of fixing or conspiring to fix the results of seven (Note: The WPBSA statement following the judgement against Li Hang incorrectly stated that he had been found guilty of fixing the results of five matches, and this was widely reported by the media such as the BBC. Paragraph 261 of the judgement clearly states that Li was found guilty of fixing the results of seven matches, comprising charges 11b–11h.) matches in total, in breach of Rules 2.1.2.1 and 2.2 of the WPBSA Members Rule and Regulations, and of inducing players to fix the results of seven matches, in violation of Rule 2.1.2.4. He was also found guilty of betting on matches, destroying evidence, and not cooperating with the investigation. Li received a lifetime ban and was ordered to pay £43,000 towards costs. | |
| Mark King | English Open; Last 64 | 13 December 2022 | John Higgins | 1–4 | Charges were dismissed | |
| Mark King | Welsh Open; Qualifying round | 13 February 2023 | Joe Perry | 0–4 | King was suspended with immediate effect on 18 March 2023, following irregular betting patterns reported to the WPBSA. King was found to be guilty of being in breach of Rule 2.1.2.1 and Rule 2.2 of the WPBSA Regulations, by an independent hearing convened by Sports Resolutions, chaired by Graeme McPherson KC between 7–9 May 2024. In addition, he was also found guilty of providing inside information for betting purposes. King was banned for five years, back-dated to the beginning of his suspension, and ordered to pay the WPBSA costs of £68,299.50 | |

== Chinese match-fixing ring ==
Between October 2022 and January 2023, amid the biggest match-fixing investigation in the sport's history, the WPBSA suspended ten Chinese players—Liang Wenbo, Li Hang, Lu Ning, Yan Bingtao, Zhao Xintong, Zhao Jianbo, Chang Bingyu, Bai Langning, Chen Zifan and Zhang Jiankang—and subsequently brought match-fixing charges against all of them. In total, they were charged with fixing or conspiring to fix the results of 24 matches between 2014 and October 2022. In addition to the 22 matches listed below, Lu Ning was also charged with fixing two other matches in the 2014–15 snooker season.

The bulk of the match-fixing was arranged by Liang Wenbo and Li Hang, sometimes working with each other and, at other times, independently. The two players had a slightly different modus operandi; whilst Li was often cautious and conducted his fixes with a view to evading detection, Liang's focus was on maximising financial gain and he often intimidated or threatened the younger players. The inquiry heard from three players who were ultimately not charged: Cao Yupeng, Xu Si and Yuan Sijun. Cao was approached twice by Liang but he and his wife declined to carry out the fixes. Xu Si also refused to fix a result when Liang approached him. Yuan was regarded as an "unimpressive" witness, but ultimately no charges were brought against him.

The cases were heard by an independent disciplinary tribunal, and in June 2023 all ten players were successfully prosecuted on various match-fixing charges in 20 of the 24 matches. Seven of the ten players were all also found guilty of betting offences. Liang and Li both received lifetime bans from the sport, whilst the other eight players received bans ranging from five years and four months to one year and eight months, backdated to the beginning of their suspensions. Liang and Li were each required to pay £43,000 in costs, and the other eight were each required to pay £7,500 in costs.

| † Result was not fixed | | | | | Liang Wenbo | Li Hang | Lu Ning | Yan Bingtao | Zhao Xintong | Zhao Jianbo | Chang Bingyu | Bai Langning | Chen Zifan | Zhang Jiankang | |
| Charges brought against Chinese match-fixing ring | | | | | Liang Wenbo | Li Hang | Lu Ning | Yan Bingtao | Zhao Xintong | Zhao Jianbo | Chang Bingyu | Bai Langning | Chen Zifan | Zhang Jiankang | |
| Event | Date | Player | Score | Opponent | Liang Wenbo | Li Hang | Lu Ning | Yan Bingtao | Zhao Xintong | Zhao Jianbo | Chang Bingyu | Bai Langning | Chen Zifan | Zhang Jiankang | |
| European Tour – Event 5 Last 128 | 13 December 2014 | Lu Ning | 2–4 | Oliver Lines | | | Lu Ning | | | | | | | | Conspiring to match-fix |
| European Tour – Event 5 Last 128 | 13 December 2014 | Lu Ning | 2–4 | Oliver Lines | | | | | | | | | | | Inducing another to match-fix |
| Paul Hunter Classic; Last 16 | 28 August 2016 | Yan Bingtao | 1–4 | Dominic Dale | | | | Yan Bingtao | | | | | | | Conspiring to match-fix |
| Paul Hunter Classic; Last 16 | 28 August 2016 | Yan Bingtao | 1–4 | Dominic Dale | | | | | | | | | | | Inducing another to match-fix |
| UK Championship; Last 128 | 25 November 2021 | Yan Bingtao | 6–0 | Ng On-yee | | | | | | | | | | | Conspiring to match-fix |
| UK Championship; Last 128 | 25 November 2021 | Yan Bingtao | 6–0 | Ng On-yee | Liang Wenbo | | | | | | | | | | Inducing another to match-fix |
| Home Nations Series | 10 October 2021 – 6 March 2022 | Yan Bingtao | — | — | | | | | | | | | | | Conspiring to match-fix |
| Home Nations Series | 10 October 2021 – 6 March 2022 | Yan Bingtao | — | — | | Li Hang | | | | | | | | | Inducing another to match-fix |
| Welsh Open; Last 32 | 3 March 2022 | Yan Bingtao | 2–4 | Ricky Walden | | | | Yan Bingtao | Zhao Xintong | | | | | | Conspiring to match-fix |
| Welsh Open; Last 32 | 3 March 2022 | Yan Bingtao | 2–4 | Ricky Walden | | | | | | | | | | | Inducing another to match-fix |
| Turkish Masters; Last 16 | 11 March 2022 | Yan Bingtao | 4–5 | Oliver Lines | | | | Yan Bingtao | Zhao Xintong | | | | | | Conspiring to match-fix |
| Turkish Masters; Last 16 | 11 March 2022 | Yan Bingtao | 4–5 | Oliver Lines | | | | | | | | | | | Inducing another to match-fix |
| European Masters; Qualifying | 22 July 2022 | Zhang Jiankang | 1–5 | Jack Lisowski | | | | | | | | | | Zhang Jiankang | Conspiring to match-fix |
| European Masters; Qualifying | 22 July 2022 | Zhang Jiankang | 1–5 | Jack Lisowski | | | | | | | | | | | Inducing another to match-fix |
| European Masters; Qualifying | 23 July 2022 | Lu Ning | 0–5 | Robert Milkins | | Li Hang | Lu Ning | | | | | | | | Conspiring to match-fix |
| European Masters; Qualifying | 23 July 2022 | Lu Ning | 0–5 | Robert Milkins | | Li Hang | | | | | | | | | Inducing another to match-fix |
| European Masters †; Qualifying | 24 July 2022 | Chen Zifan | 1–5 | Aaron Hill | Liang Wenbo | Li Hang | | | | | | | Chen Zhifan | | Conspiring to match-fix |
| European Masters †; Qualifying | 24 July 2022 | Chen Zifan | 1–5 | Aaron Hill | Liang Wenbo | Li Hang | | | | | | | | | Inducing another to match-fix |
| British Open; Qualifying | 9 August 2022 | Chen Zifan | 4–2 | Mink Nutcharut | Liang Wenbo | Li Hang | | | | | | | Chen Zhifan | | Conspiring to match-fix |
| British Open; Qualifying | 9 August 2022 | Chen Zifan | 4–2 | Mink Nutcharut | Liang Wenbo | Li Hang | | | | | | | | | Inducing another to match-fix |
| Northern Ireland Open †; Qualifying | 23 August 2022 | Chen Zifan | 4–1 | Ng On-yee | | Li Hang | | | | | | | Chen Zhifan | | Conspiring to match-fix |
| Northern Ireland Open †; Qualifying | 23 August 2022 | Chen Zifan | 4–1 | Ng On-yee | | Li Hang | | | | | | | | | Inducing another to match-fix |
| Northern Ireland Open †; Qualifying | 23 August 2022 | Cao Yupeng | 4–1 | Dylan Emery | | | | | | | | | | | Conspiring to match-fix |
| Northern Ireland Open †; Qualifying | 23 August 2022 | Cao Yupeng | 4–1 | Dylan Emery | Liang Wenbo | | | | | | | | | | Inducing another to match-fix |
| Northern Ireland Open; Qualifying | 25 August 2022 | Yuan Sijun | 3–4 | Jimmy White | | | | | | | | | | | Conspiring to match-fix |
| Northern Ireland Open; Qualifying | 25 August 2022 | Yuan Sijun | 3–4 | Jimmy White | | Li Hang | | | | | | | | | Inducing another to match-fix |
| Northern Ireland Open; Qualifying | 26 August 2022 | Zhao Jianbo | 0–4 | Aaron Hill | Liang Wenbo | Li Hang | Lu Ning | | | Zhao Jianbo | | | | | Conspiring to match-fix |
| Northern Ireland Open; Qualifying | 26 August 2022 | Zhao Jianbo | 0–4 | Aaron Hill | Liang Wenbo | Li Hang | Lu Ning | | | | | | | | Inducing another to match-fix |
| British Open †; Qualifying | 26 September 2022 | Bai Langning | 1–4 | Zhao Xintong | Liang Wenbo | Li Hang | | | | | | Bai Langning | | | Conspiring to match-fix |
| British Open †; Qualifying | 26 September 2022 | Bai Langning | 1–4 | Zhao Xintong | Liang Wenbo | Li Hang | | | | | | | | | Inducing another to match-fix |
| British Open †; Last 64 | 27 September 2022 | Lu Ning | 4–1 | Zhou Yuelong | | | | | | | | | | | Conspiring to match-fix |
| British Open †; Last 64 | 27 September 2022 | Lu Ning | 4–1 | Zhou Yuelong | Liang Wenbo | | | | | | | | | | Inducing another to match-fix |
| British Open †; Last 64 | 28 September 2022 | Yan Bingtao | 4–0 | Andy Lee | | Li Hang | | | | | | | | | Conspiring to match-fix |
| British Open †; Last 64 | 28 September 2022 | Yan Bingtao | 4–0 | Andy Lee | | Li Hang | | | | | | | | | Inducing another to match-fix |
| British Open; Last 32 | 28 September 2022 | Chang Bingyu | 1–4 | Jamie Jones | Liang Wenbo | | Lu Ning | | | | Chang Bingyu | | | | Conspiring to match-fix |
| British Open; Last 32 | 28 September 2022 | Chang Bingyu | 1–4 | Jamie Jones | Liang Wenbo | | Lu Ning | | | | | | | | Inducing another to match-fix |
| British Open; Last 32 | 29 September 2022 | Yan Bingtao | 3–4 | Jordan Brown | | Li Hang | | Yan Bingtao | | | | | | | Conspiring to match-fix |
| British Open; Last 32 | 29 September 2022 | Yan Bingtao | 3–4 | Jordan Brown | | Li Hang | | | | | | | | | Inducing another to match-fix |
| British Open; Last 16 | 29 September 2022 | Yuan Sijun | 4–3 | Anthony Hamilton | | | | | | | | | | | Conspiring to match-fix |
| British Open; Last 16 | 29 September 2022 | Yuan Sijun | 4–3 | Anthony Hamilton | Liang Wenbo | | | | | | | | | | Inducing another to match-fix |
| British Open †; Last 32 | 29 September 2022 | Xu Si | 0–4 | Judd Trump | | | | | | | | | | | Conspiring to match-fix |
| British Open †; Last 32 | 29 September 2022 | Xu Si | 0–4 | Judd Trump | Liang Wenbo | | | | | | | | | | Inducing another to match-fix |
| Scottish Open †; Qualifying | 13 October 2022 | Cao Yupeng | 4–2 | Yuan Sijun | | | | | | | | | | | Conspiring to match-fix |
| Scottish Open †; Qualifying | 13 October 2022 | Cao Yupeng | 4–2 | Yuan Sijun | Liang Wenbo | | | | | | | | | | Inducing another to match-fix |
