= 2019 China Championship =

Snooker tournament

2019 Evergrande China Championship
Tournament information
- Dates: 23–29 September 2019
- Venue: Guangzhou Tianhe Sports Centre
- City: Guangzhou
- Country: China
- Organisation: World Snooker
- Format: Ranking event
- Total prize fund: £751,000
- Winner's share: £150,000
- Highest break: Mark Allen (NIR) (145)

Final
- Champion: Shaun Murphy (ENG)
- Runner-up: Mark Williams (WAL)
- Score: 10–9

The 2019 China Championship (officially the 2019 Evergrande China Championship) was a professional snooker tournament that took place from 23 to 29 September 2019. The event was held at the Guangzhou Tianhe Sports Centre in Guangzhou, China. Qualifying for the event took place from 15 to 18 August 2019 at the Barnsley Metrodome in Barnsley, England. The tournament was the fourth edition of the China Championship and the third ranking event of the 2019/2020 season.

Mark Selby was the defending champion, having defeated John Higgins in the previous year's final 10–9. Selby reached the semi-finals, before losing 6–3 to Shaun Murphy. Murphy reached his third consecutive final, having done so at the two prior events Shanghai Masters and the International Championship. Murphy played Mark Williams in the final, winning his 8th ranking title with a 10–9 in the final. The highest break of the event was a 145 made by Mark Allen in the first round win over Anthony Hamilton.

== Tournament format ==
The 2019 China Championship was the fourth edition of the China Championship, first held in 2016. The event featured 64 players with a wildcard and qualifying round. Matches were played as best-of-9-frames until the semi-finals. At the semi-final stage, both matches were played as best-of-11-frames, and the two session final as best-of-19-frames.

=== Prize fund ===
The event featured a total prize fund of £751,000, with the winner receiving £150,000. This was slightly higher than the 2018 prize fund of £725,000 with the same denomination for the winner. A breakdown of prize money at the event is shown below:

- Winner: £150,000
- Runner-up: £75,000
- Semi-final: £32,000
- Quarter-final: £20,000
- Last 16: £13,000
- Last 32: £7,500
- Last 64: £4,750
- Highest break: £6,000
- Total: £751,000

== Tournament summary ==
Qualifying for the event was played over one round, and a pre-qualifier wildcard round. Qualifying took place between 15 and 18 August 2019 at the Barnsley Metrodome in Barnsley, England featuring 64 matches. Participants included players on the World Snooker Tour and invited amateur players.

=== Early rounds (first–fourth round) ===
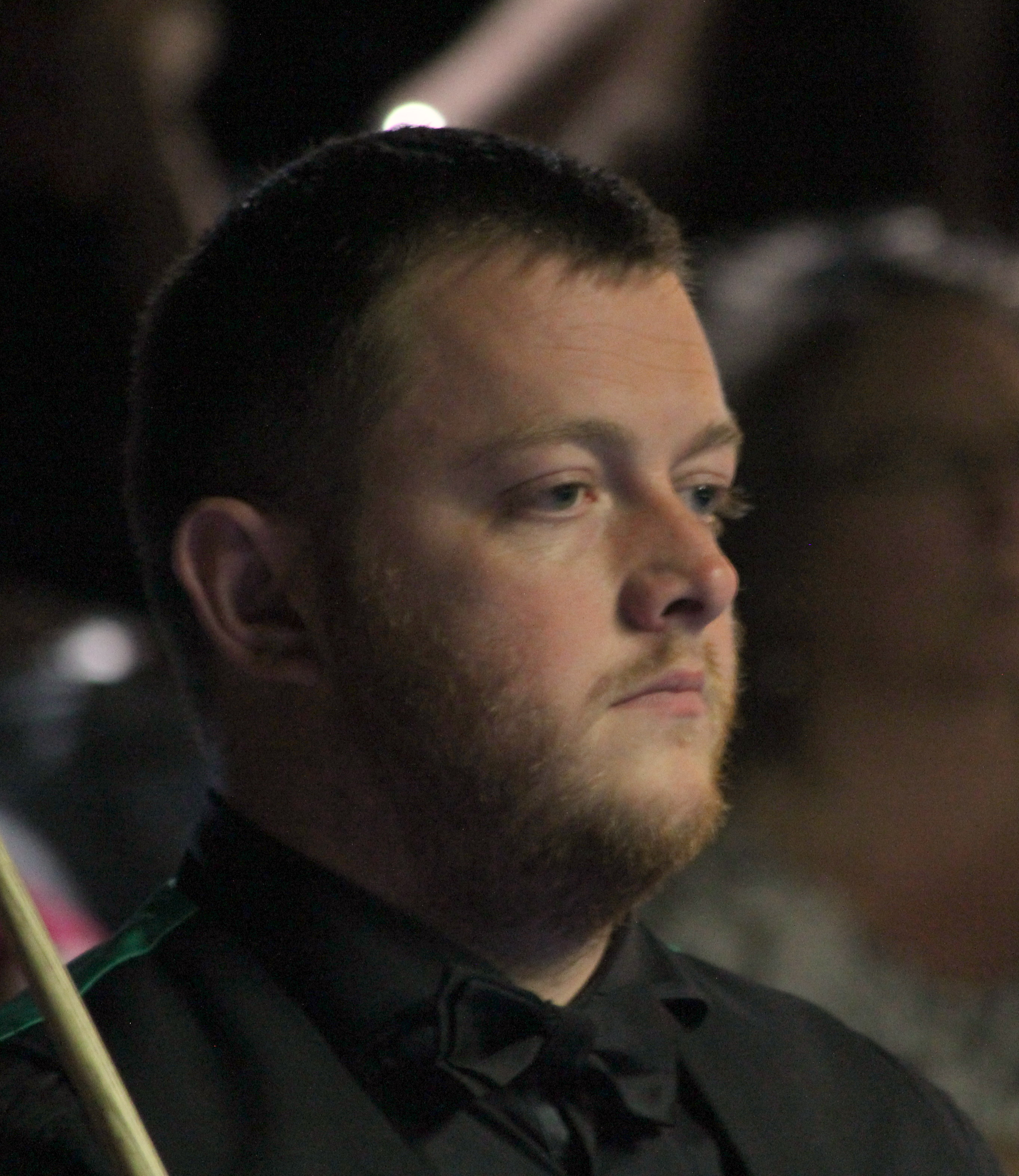
Mark Allen scored the highest break of the event, a 145.

Defending champion Mark Selby won his opening first round match, defeating Chen Feilong. Selby trailed 1–2, before Selby won three of the next four to win the match 5–3. Selby defeated Martin Gould, and then Chris Wakelin both 5–2 to reach the quarter-finals. Three-time world champion Mark Williams defeated Kishan Hirani in an all Welsh opening round match 5–1. Williams defeated Luo Honghao and Luca Brecel to reach the quarter-finals. Former world champion Graeme Dott lost on a deciding frame to Norwegian Kurt Maflin during the first round 5–4. Maflin then defeated Jordan Brown to play four-time world champion John Higgins. Four-time world champion Higgins led their match 3–0, before Maflin won five frames in-a-row to win the match, and reach the quarter-finals.

Having amassed a 15-match winning streak, Judd Trump lost in the third round to Joe Perry 5–2. Trump had not lost a match since April, and won the prior two tournaments that he played in, the World Snooker Championship and the International Championship. The 2005 world champion Shaun Murphy also reached the quarter-finals. He defeated Yuan Sijun, Ryan Day, and Matthew Selt all 5–3. Barry Hawkins defeated Liam Highfield, Mitchell Mann and Zhao Xintong to reach the last-8. Iranian Hossein Vafaei defeated Tom Ford, Kyren Wilson and Anthony McGill to reach the quarter-finals.

Former world number one Ding Junhui also lost his opening match where he lost 5–3 to Zhao Xintong. Mark Allen won his opening match against Anthony Hamilton 5–3, also making the highest break of the tournament, a 145. Allen subsequently lost in the second round to Noppon Saengkham 5–4. Saengkham lost the third round to David Gilbert.

=== Later rounds (quarter-final–final) ===
The quarter-finals were played on 27 September. Defending champion Selby played Hawkins in the first quarter-final. The pair were always within one frame between scores, and were tied at 4–4. Selby made match's highest break of 98 in the deciding frame to claim a 5–4 victory. Shaun Murphy drew Kurt Maflin, Murphy lead the match throughout and won 5–2. Having defeated the reigning world champion in the round prior, Joe Perry was defeated by Hossein Vafaei. In winning the match, Vafaei reached only his third ranking semi-final. In the last quarter-final match, Mark Williams defeated David Gilbert 5–1.

The semi-finals were played on 28 September, as best-of-11-frames matches. The first match had Murphy defeat Selby. Murphy won the first three frames of the match, before Selby won three of the next four with breaks of 100, and 101. Murphy won the next two frames to win the match 6–3. The second semi-final was contested between Vafaei and Williams. Vafaei had never played in a ranking event final, but reached this stage at the 2017 China Open, and the 2019 Welsh Open. Williams had lost only six frames in the prior five matches. Williams won the first three frames, and four of the first five to lead 4–1, before Vafaei made a 134 break to trail 4–2. Williams won frame seven, to be one away from victory, but Vafaei won three frames in-a-row to take the match to a deciding frame. Williams made a thin cut, and made a 96 break to win the match. He later commented, "[he] could play that another 20 times and [he] wouldn't get it".

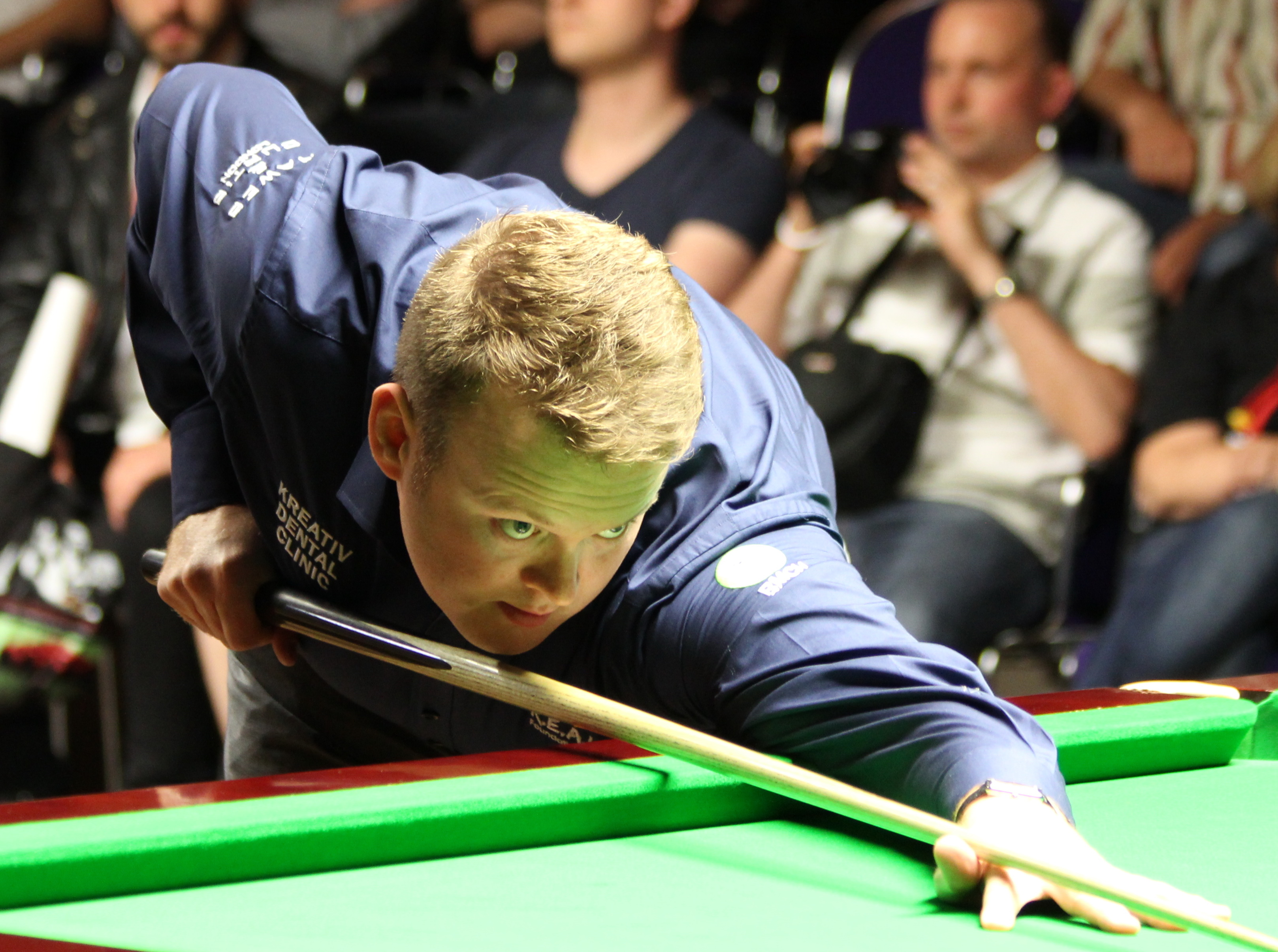
Shaun Murphy won the tournament, defeating Mark Williams 10–9 in the final.

The final was played on 29 September, a best-of-19-frames match played over two sessions. The final was contested between Shaun Murphy (who had defeated Yuan Sijun, Ryan Day, Matthew Selt, Kurt Maflin and Mark Selby to reach the final), and Mark Williams (who defeated Kishan Hirani, Luo Honghao, Luca Brecel, David Gilbert, and Hossein Vafaei). This was Williams' 35th ranking event final, event final and Murphy's 20th. Murphy had reached the final of both of the prior two tournaments, the International Championship and the Shanghai Masters, but had not won any of his prior five tournament finals. Williams, in comparison, had won all of his last five finals.

The first session ended 5–4 in favour of Murphy, with Williams tying the match in frame 10. Murphy made breaks of 75, 76, 103 and 79 in four consecutive frames to lead 9–5. With his opponent one frame from winning the event, Williams won the next four frames, including a break of 132 in frame 18 to force a deciding frame. Murphy was the first player to get a chance in the frame, scoring 69, enough to force Williams to require a snooker. Williams made a break of 30, and attempted to play a snooker. However, Murphy potted the last remaining red ball to win the frame and match. After his win, he would comment that the break in the deciding frame was "one of the best breaks of [his] life". Murphy's last victory was over 18 months prior, and had struggled during the 2018/19 season, which he called the "worst run" of his career.

== Main draw ==
The main draw of the event featured 64 players. Players in bold denote match winners.

=== Top half ===
**Last 64**; Best of 9 frames
**Mark Selby (ENG)** | **5**
Lu Ning (CHN) | 2
**Martin Gould (ENG)** | **5**
Scott Donaldson (SCO) | 3
Alexander Ursenbacher (SUI) | 1
**Chris Wakelin (ENG)** | **5**
**Yan Bingtao (CHN)** | **5**
Sam Baird (ENG) | 4
Martin O'Donnell (ENG) | 4
**Xiao Guodong (CHN)** | **5**
**Zhao Xintong (CHN)** | **5**
Ding Junhui (CHN) | 3
**Mitchell Mann (ENG)** | **5**
Lyu Haotian (CHN) | 4
Liam Highfield (ENG) | 2
**Barry Hawkins (ENG)** | **5**
**John Higgins (SCO)** | **5**
Andrew Higginson (ENG) | 1
**Li Hang (CHN)** | **5**
Sam Craigie (ENG) | 2
**Jordan Brown (NIR)** | **5**
Sunny Akani (THA) | 4
Graeme Dott (SCO) | 4
**Kurt Maflin (NOR)** | **5**
Joe O'Connor (ENG) | 4
**Ryan Day (WAL)** | **5**
Yuan Sijun (CHN) | 3
**Shaun Murphy (ENG)** | **5**
Ben Woollaston (ENG) | 2
**Matthew Selt (ENG)** | **5**
Zhao Jianbo (CHN) | 1
**Neil Robertson (AUS)** | **5**

**Last 32**; Best of 9 frames
**(England) Mark Selby** | **5**
(England) Martin Gould | 2
**(England) Chris Wakelin** | **5**
(China) Yan Bingtao | 2
(China) Xiao Guodong | 3
**(China) Zhao Xintong** | **5**
(England) Mitchell Mann | 1
**(England) Barry Hawkins** | **5**
**(Scotland) John Higgins** | **5**
(China) Li Hang | 3
(Northern Ireland) Jordan Brown | 3
**(Norway) Kurt Maflin** | **5**
(Wales) Ryan Day | 3
**(England) Shaun Murphy** | **5**
**(England) Matthew Selt** | **5**
(Australia) Neil Robertson | 1

**Last 16**; Best of 9 frames
**(England) Mark Selby** | **5**
(England) Chris Wakelin | 2
(China) Zhao Xintong | 4
**(England) Barry Hawkins** | **5**
(Scotland) John Higgins | 3
**(Norway) Kurt Maflin** | **5**
**(England) Shaun Murphy** | **5**
(England) Matthew Selt | 3

**Quarter-finals**; Best of 9 frames
**(England) Mark Selby** | **5**
(England) Barry Hawkins | 4
(Norway) Kurt Maflin | 2
**(England) Shaun Murphy** | **5**

**Semi-finals**; Best of 11 frames
(England) Mark Selby | 3
**(England) Shaun Murphy** | **6**

=== Bottom half ===
**Last 64**; Best of 9 frames
**Mark Williams (WAL)** | **5**
Kishan Hirani (WAL) | 1
Ricky Walden (ENG) | 4
**Luo Honghao (CHN)** | **5**
**Luca Brecel (BEL)** | **5**
Tian Pengfei (CHN) | 4
Jak Jones (WAL) | 3
**Mark Joyce (ENG)** | **5**
**Matthew Stevens (WAL)** | **5**
Dominic Dale (WAL) | 2
Marco Fu (HKG) | 1
**David Gilbert (ENG)** | **5**
**Noppon Saengkham (THA)** | **5**
Mark King (ENG) | 2
Anthony Hamilton (ENG) | 3
**Mark Allen (NIR)** | **5**
**Kyren Wilson (ENG)** | **5**
Robbie Williams (ENG) | 0
Tom Ford (ENG) | 1
**Hossein Vafaei (IRN)** | **5**
**Jack Lisowski (ENG)** | **5**
Daniel Wells (WAL) | 1
**Anthony McGill (SCO)** | **5**
Michael Holt (ENG) | 2
Hammad Miah (ENG) | 0
**Joe Perry (ENG)** | **5**
Harvey Chandler (ENG) | 2
**Stephen Maguire (SCO)** | **5**
Thepchaiya Un-Nooh (THA) | 1
**Zhou Yuelong (CHN)** | **5**
Mike Dunn (ENG) | 0
**Judd Trump (ENG)** | **5**

**Last 32**; Best of 9 frames
**(Wales) Mark Williams** | **5**
(China) Luo Honghao | 3
**(Belgium) Luca Brecel** | **5**
(England) Mark Joyce | 0
(Wales) Matthew Stevens | 2
**(England) David Gilbert** | **5**
**(Thailand) Noppon Saengkham** | **5**
(Northern Ireland) Mark Allen | 4
(England) Kyren Wilson | 3
**(Iran) Hossein Vafaei** | **5**
(England) Jack Lisowski | 3
**(Scotland) Anthony McGill** | **5**
**(England) Joe Perry** | **5**
(Scotland) Stephen Maguire | 3
(China) Zhou Yuelong | 0
**(England) Judd Trump** | **5**

**Last 16**; Best of 9 frames
**(Wales) Mark Williams** | **5**
(Belgium) Luca Brecel | 1
**(England) David Gilbert** | **5**
(Thailand) Noppon Saengkham | 2
**(Iran) Hossein Vafaei** | **5**
(Scotland) Anthony McGill | 4
**(England) Joe Perry** | **5**
(England) Judd Trump | 2

**Quarter-finals**; Best of 9 frames
**(Wales) Mark Williams** | **5**
(England) David Gilbert | 1
**(Iran) Hossein Vafaei** | **5**
(England) Joe Perry | 3

**Semi-finals**; Best of 11 frames
**(Wales) Mark Williams** | **6**
(Iran) Hossein Vafaei | 5

=== Final ===
Final: Best of 19 frames. Referee: Peggy Li. Guangzhou Tianhe Sports Centre, Guangzhou, China, 29 September 2019.
| **Shaun Murphy**; England | **10**–9 | Mark Williams; Wales |
Afternoon: **54**–10, **65**–56, 0–**73**, 17–**101**, 6–**78**, **74**–4, 0–**143** (143), **76**–14, **133**–0 (133); Evening: 59–**61**, **79**–0, **77**–42, **103**–35 (103), **92**–42, 0–**73**, 27–**76**, 49–**78**, 0–**132** (132), **70**–30
| 133 | Highest break | **143** |
| 2 | Century breaks | 2 |

== Qualifying ==
Qualifying for the event took place between 15 and 18 August 2019 at the Barnsley Metrodome in Barnsley, England. Matches involving four wildcard players, Mark Selby and Chen Feilong, Yan Bingtao and Mei Xiwen, Ding Junhui and Brandon Sargeant, Ken Doherty, Tom Ford, Judd Trump and James Wattana, were held over and played in Guangzhou. Matches were played as best-of-9-frames. Players in bold denote match winners.

=== Round 1 ===
| (China) Li Yingdong | 1–**5** | **(China) Zhao Jianbo** |

| (China) Wu Yize | 2–**5** | **(China) Pang Junxu** |

=== Round 2 ===
| (England) **Mark Selby** | **5**–3 | (China) Chen Feilong |
| (China) **Lu Ning** | **5**–1 | (Brazil) Igor Figueiredo |
| (England) **Martin Gould** | **5**–3 | (England) Ashley Carty |
| (Scotland) **Scott Donaldson** | **5**–1 | (Poland) Adam Stefanow |
| (England) Ali Carter | 4–**5** | (Switzerland) **Alexander Ursenbacher** |
| (England) **Chris Wakelin** | **5**–2 | (Wales) Lee Walker |
| (China) **Yan Bingtao** | **5**–4 | (China) Mei Xiwen |
| (England) Peter Ebdon | 3–**5** | (England) **Sam Baird** |
| (England) **Martin O'Donnell** | **5**–3 | (Australia) Steve Mifsud |
| (China) **Xiao Guodong** | **5**–1 | (China) Lei Peifan |
| (China) **Zhao Xintong** | **5**–3 | (England) David Grace |
| (China) **Ding Junhui** | **5**–0 | (England) Brandon Sargeant |
| (China) Liang Wenbo | 3–**5** | (England) **Mitchell Mann** |
| (China) **Lyu Haotian** | **5**–3 | (England) Louis Heathcote |
| (England) **Liam Highfield** | **5**–2 | (China) Si Jiahui |
| (England) **Barry Hawkins** | **5**–3 | (England) Barry Pinches |
| (Scotland) **John Higgins** | **5**–4 | (England) Andy Hicks |
| (England) **Andrew Higginson** | **5**–4 | (England) John Astley |
| (China) **Li Hang** | **5**–0 | (China) Bai Langning |
| (England) Robert Milkins | 4–**5** | (England) **Sam Craigie** |
| (England) Stuart Bingham | 3–**5** | (Northern Ireland) **Jordan Brown** |
| (Thailand) **Sunny Akani** | **5**–0 | (Germany) Simon Lichtenberg |
| (Scotland) **Graeme Dott** | **5**–4 | (Wales) Jackson Page |
| (Norway) **Kurt Maflin** | **5**–2 | (England) Billy Joe Castle |
| (Wales) Michael White | 3–**5** | (England) **Joe O'Connor** |
| (Wales) **Ryan Day** | **5**–4 | (Wales) Duane Jones |
| (China) **Yuan Sijun** | **5**–4 | (England) Craig Steadman |
| (England) **Shaun Murphy** | **5**–2 | (China) Fan Zhengyi |
| (England) **Ben Woollaston** | **5**–3 | (China) Zhang Jiankang |
| (England) **Matthew Selt** | **5**–1 | (Poland) Kacper Filipiak |
| (Republic of Ireland) Ken Doherty | w/d–**w/o** | **(China) Zhao Jianbo** |
| (Australia) **Neil Robertson** | **5**–3 | (Northern Ireland) Gerard Greene |

| (Wales) **Mark Williams** | **5**–1 | (Hong Kong) Andy Lee |
| (Republic of Ireland) Fergal O'Brien | 4–**5** | (Wales) **Kishan Hirani** |
| (England) **Ricky Walden** | **5**–3 | (China) Xu Si |
| (England) Mark Davis | 2–**5** | (China) **Luo Honghao** |
| (Belgium) **Luca Brecel** | **5**–1 | (China) Zhang Anda |
| (Scotland) Alan McManus | 4–**5** | (China) **Tian Pengfei** |
| (England) Gary Wilson | 3–**5** | (Wales) **Jak Jones** |
| (England) **Mark Joyce** | **5**–4 | (England) Elliot Slessor |
| (Wales) **Matthew Stevens** | **5**–3 | (England) Jamie O'Neill |
| (England) Jimmy Robertson | 2–**5** | (Wales) **Dominic Dale** |
| (Hong Kong) **Marco Fu** | **5**–4 | (England) James Cahill |
| (England) **David Gilbert** | **5**–2 | (England) Peter Lines |
| (Thailand) **Noppon Saengkham** | **5**–0 | (England) Nigel Bond |
| (England) **Mark King** | **5**–1 | (England) Rod Lawler |
| (England) **Anthony Hamilton** | **5**–4 | (Malta) Alex Borg |
| (Northern Ireland) **Mark Allen** | **5**–1 | (Israel) Eden Sharav |
| (England) **Kyren Wilson** | **5**–1 | (Wales) Jamie Clarke |
| (England) **Robbie Williams** | **5**–1 | (Scotland) Fraser Patrick |
| (England) **Tom Ford** | **5**–2 | (China) Pang Junxu |
| (Iran) **Hossein Vafaei** | **5**–4 | (England) Jimmy White |
| (England) **Jack Lisowski** | **5**–0 | (England) Oliver Lines |
| (Wales) **Daniel Wells** | **5**–2 | (China) Chang Bingyu |
| (Scotland) **Anthony McGill** | **5**–1 | (China) Chen Zifan |
| (England) **Michael Holt** | **5**–1 | (England) David Lilley |
| (Cyprus) Michael Georgiou | 4–**5** | (England) **Hammad Miah** |
| (England) **Joe Perry** | **5**–4 | (England) Alfie Burden |
| (England) Stuart Carrington | 4–**5** | (England) **Harvey Chandler** |
| (Scotland) **Stephen Maguire** | **5**–3 | (England) Ian Burns |
| (Thailand) **Thepchaiya Un-Nooh** | **5**–0 | (Iran) Soheil Vahedi |
| (China) **Zhou Yuelong** | **5**–0 | (England) Riley Parsons |
| (England) **Mike Dunn** | **5**–2 | (Malaysia) Thor Chuan Leong |
| (England) **Judd Trump** | **5**–1 | (Thailand) James Wattana |

== Century breaks ==
=== Main stage centuries ===
There were a total of 58 century breaks made during the tournament. Mark Allen made the highest break of the event, a 145. The break was made in frame five of the first round win over Anthony Hamilton. Three centuries were made in held over matches, two by Mark Selby and one by Judd Trump.

- 145, 117 – Mark Allen
- 143, 132 – Mark Williams
- 140 – Noppon Saengkham
- 139, 103 – Barry Hawkins
- 138 – Mark King
- 137, 121, 121, 108, 101, 100 – Mark Selby
- 137, 134, 123, 104 – Hossein Vafaei
- 137 – Scott Donaldson
- 135, 116, 101 – Kyren Wilson
- 134, 101 – Joe Perry
- 133, 129, 103, 100 – Shaun Murphy
- 133 – Marco Fu
- 131, 124 – Stephen Maguire
- 130, 120, 113 – Luo Honghao
- 127 – Yuan Sijun
- 126, 126 – David Gilbert
- 126, 101 – Yan Bingtao
- 122, 121, 109, 102 – Judd Trump
- 120, 116, 109 – Chris Wakelin
- 119 – Ryan Day
- 117 – Joe O'Connor
- 108 – Li Hang
- 106 – John Higgins
- 105, 103 – Ricky Walden
- 104, 103 – Kurt Maflin
- 104 – Luca Brecel
- 104 – Tian Pengfei
- 104 – Xiao Guodong
- 101 – Anthony Hamilton

=== Qualifying stage centuries ===
There were a total of 28 century breaks made during the qualifying matches preceding the event.

- 143 – Zhao Xintong
- 141, 101 – Shaun Murphy
- 138 – Sam Baird
- 134 – Chris Wakelin
- 132 – Michael Georgiou
- 132 – Stephen Maguire
- 131 – David Gilbert
- 123 – Jak Jones
- 122 – Zhou Yuelong
- 120 – Mark Joyce
- 120 – Sunny Akani
- 118 – Anthony Hamilton
- 112 – Ashley Carty
- 112 – Barry Hawkins
- 110 – Mark Williams
- 108 – Kyren Wilson
- 107 – Ryan Day
- 107 – Marco Fu
- 106 – John Higgins
- 105 – Noppon Saengkham
- 104 – Chen Zifan
- 104 – Andy Hicks
- 102 – Lyu Haotian
- 102 – Robert Milkins
- 101 – Luca Brecel
- 100 – Liam Highfield
- 100 – Hammad Miah
