= Zhang Jiankang =

Chinese snooker player (born 1998)

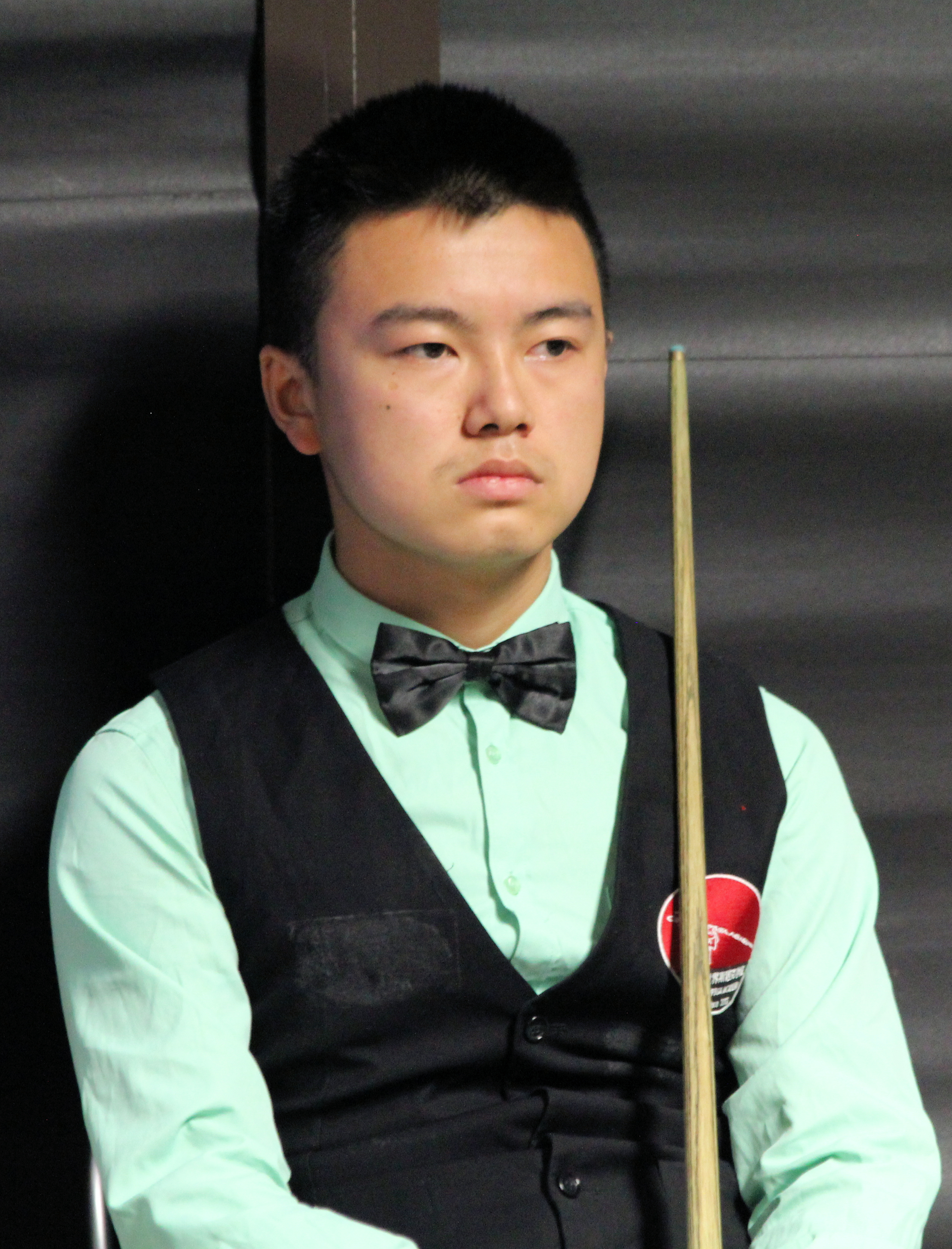
- Zhang at the 2018 Paul Hunter Classic

Personal information
- Born: 25 August 1998 (age 28) Yibin, Sichuan, China

Sport
- Country: China
- Sport: Snooker
- Professional: 2018–2020, 2021–2023
- Highest ranking: 74 (June 2022)
- Best ranking finish: Last 16 (x2)

Zhang Jiankang (Chinese: 张健康; born 25 August 1998) is a Chinese former professional snooker player. He was suspended from the professional tour in January 2023 as part of a match-fixing investigation involving ten Chinese players. He was subsequently charged with fixing a match, failing to report approaches for him to fix matches, and betting on snooker. In June 2023 he was given a four year and five months suspension, which following early admissions and a guilty plea, was reduced to 2 years and 11 months until 1 December 2025.

== Career ==
Zhang started to play aged 8, influenced by his father, who was a club-level player. He had seen Ding Junhui playing on television, and expressed an interest. At the age of 11, Zhang left mainstream school and went alone to Shenzhen and later Shanghai, where he was coached by Wu Wenzhong who had previously coached Ding Junhui. In 2014 Zhang won the Sichuan Provincial Championship and the Chinese U21 Championship, and was accepted in the CBSA Academy in Beijing.

=== Early career ===
Following Zhang's promising performances in the academy and in Chinese tour events, the CBSA awarded him a wildcard for the 2016 International Championship in Daqing. There he defeated Ross Muir 6-3 before losing to Stuart Bingham 6–1.

At the 2017 IBSF U-21 Championship he missed the final red attempting a maximum break against Jackson Page. He lost in the semi-finals to eventual winner Fan Zhengyi.

In April 2018 he was awarded a two-year professional tour card, being ranked at the highest amateur in the CBSA China Tour ranking list.

=== 2018/2019 ===
He competed at the 2018 World Snooker Team Cup representing China with Fan Zhengyi but they lost to India 2–3 in the Round of 16.

Zhang's first win as a professional was against Michael Holt in the European Masters. Unfortunately, a lost ID card meant he was unable to travel to the UK to compete in the World Championship. He finished his first season ranked 113.

=== 2019/2020 ===
At the start of the 2019–20 season, Zhang was again affected by travel problems, missing the first two tournaments. He then went on a losing run of 5 matches. At the Scottish Open he produced his best performance to date, beating Chen Feilong, John Astley and Tom Ford to reach the last-16, where he lost to Scott Donaldson. In the Welsh Open he lost 4–1 in the first round to 5-times World Champion Ronnie O'Sullivan.

With the outbreak of COVID-19, Zhang sought to return to China on 29 March. His journey included quarantines in both Shanghai and his hometown Yibin, after an internal flight. He finally reached home after almost 1 month of travelling, spent mostly in isolation hotels. On 28 June it was announced that he would not be returning to the UK for the World Championship, which had been rescheduled for July. This confirmed his relegation from the tour, being ranked outside the top 64.

=== 2020/2021 ===
The 2020–21 season was severely disrupted by the COVID-19 pandemic. The first snooker tournament to be staged was a teams event in Lanzhou in November 2020. Zhang Jiankang played for the Sichuan team, but they lost in the last-16 to the Jilin team. In April 2021, there were two tournaments in Beijing to determine 4 qualifiers for the World Professional Tour for the 2021–22 season. With wins over Wi Ning, Lin Hui, Fang Xiongman, Ju Reti and Deng Haohui, Zhang successfully progressed from the first event, losing only 4 frames in his six matches.

The CBSA subsequently arranged a tournament in Xi'an, where Zhang Jiankang reached the semi-final, losing to eventual winner Zhang Anda. He also recorded the highest break of 134.

In June, the China City teams event was staged, also in Xi'an. Most of the top players in China participated in the 35-team event, including 15 professionals. Zhang Jiankang played for the Sichuan team, alongside Zhou Yuelong and Cai Wei. Zhang scored the first century break in the competition, 115 against Dalian. Sichuan topped their group, and proceeded to the knockout phase. In the Q-final Zhang won a tense deciding frame against Cao Yupeng of Suzhou, the tournament favourites. But ultimately Sichuan lost 4–2 in the final to Shanghai, whose players were Tian Pengfei, Lu Ning and Zhao Jianbo.

=== 2021/2022 ===
In June, Zhang Jiankang returned to the UK as a professional, accompanied by his father. He beat Martin O'Donnell in the Summer Championship League, but ultimately finished 3rd in the 4-player group. In the British Open, he defeated Peter Lines, Li Hang and Pang Junxu to reach the last-16. There he faced Mark Williams, but lost 3-2 after missing several chances to win. In the next 9 tournaments, he could only manage one win, against Joe Perry. However, in the World Championship he beat John Astley 6-4 and Sunny Akani 6-4 (after having led 5–0) before losing to Stephen Maguire 6–3. This was his first World Championship after missing two previous events with travel problems. Zhang finished the season ranked 95.

== Performance and rankings timeline ==
Tournament	2016/ 17	2017/ 18	2018/ 19	2019/ 20	2021/ 22	2022/ 23
Ranking (Note: It shows the ranking at the beginning of the season.)	(Note: He was an amateur)		(Note: New players on the Main Tour don't have a ranking)	85	(Note: Players qualified through CBSA China Tour nomination started the season without ranking points)	74
Ranking tournaments
Championship League	Non-Ranking Event				RR	RR
European Masters	A	A	1R	LQ	1R	LQ
British Open	Tournament Not Held				4R	1R
Northern Ireland Open	A	A	1R	1R	LQ	LQ
UK Championship	A	A	1R	1R	1R	LQ
Scottish Open	A	A	3R	4R	LQ	LQ
English Open	A	A	2R	1R	WD	LQ
World Grand Prix	DNQ	DNQ	DNQ	DNQ	DNQ	DNQ
Shoot Out	A	A	1R	1R	1R	WD
German Masters	A	A	LQ	LQ	LQ	LQ
Welsh Open	A	A	2R	1R	LQ	WD
Players Championship	DNQ	DNQ	DNQ	DNQ	DNQ	DNQ
WST Classic	Tournament Not Held					A
Tour Championship	Not Held		DNQ	DNQ	DNQ	DNQ
World Championship	A	A	A	A	LQ	A
Former ranking tournaments
Shanghai Masters	A	LQ	Non-Ranking		Not Held	
Paul Hunter Classic	A	A	2R	NR	Not Held	
Indian Open	A	A	LQ	Tournament Not Held		
China Open	A	A	LQ	Tournament Not Held		
Riga Masters	A	A	LQ	WD	Not Held	
International Championship	1R	A	LQ	WD	Not Held	
China Championship	NR	A	LQ	LQ	Not Held	
World Open	A	A	LQ	LQ	Not Held	
Turkish Masters	Tournament Not Held				LQ	NH
Gibraltar Open	A	A	2R	1R	WD	NH
Former non-ranking tournaments
Haining Open	1R	A	A	2R	A	NH

Performance Table Legend
LQ	lost in the qualifying draw	#R	lost in the early rounds of the tournament (WR = Wildcard round, RR = Round robin)	QF	lost in the quarter-finals
SF	lost in the semi-finals	F	lost in the final	W	won the tournament
DNQ	did not qualify for the tournament	A	did not participate in the tournament	WD	withdrew from the tournament

NH / Not Held	means an event was not held.
NR / Non-Ranking Event	means an event is/was no longer a ranking event.
R / Ranking Event	means an event is/was a ranking event.
MR / Minor-Ranking Event	means an event is/was a minor-ranking event.
