= Chen Zifan =

Chinese professional snooker player

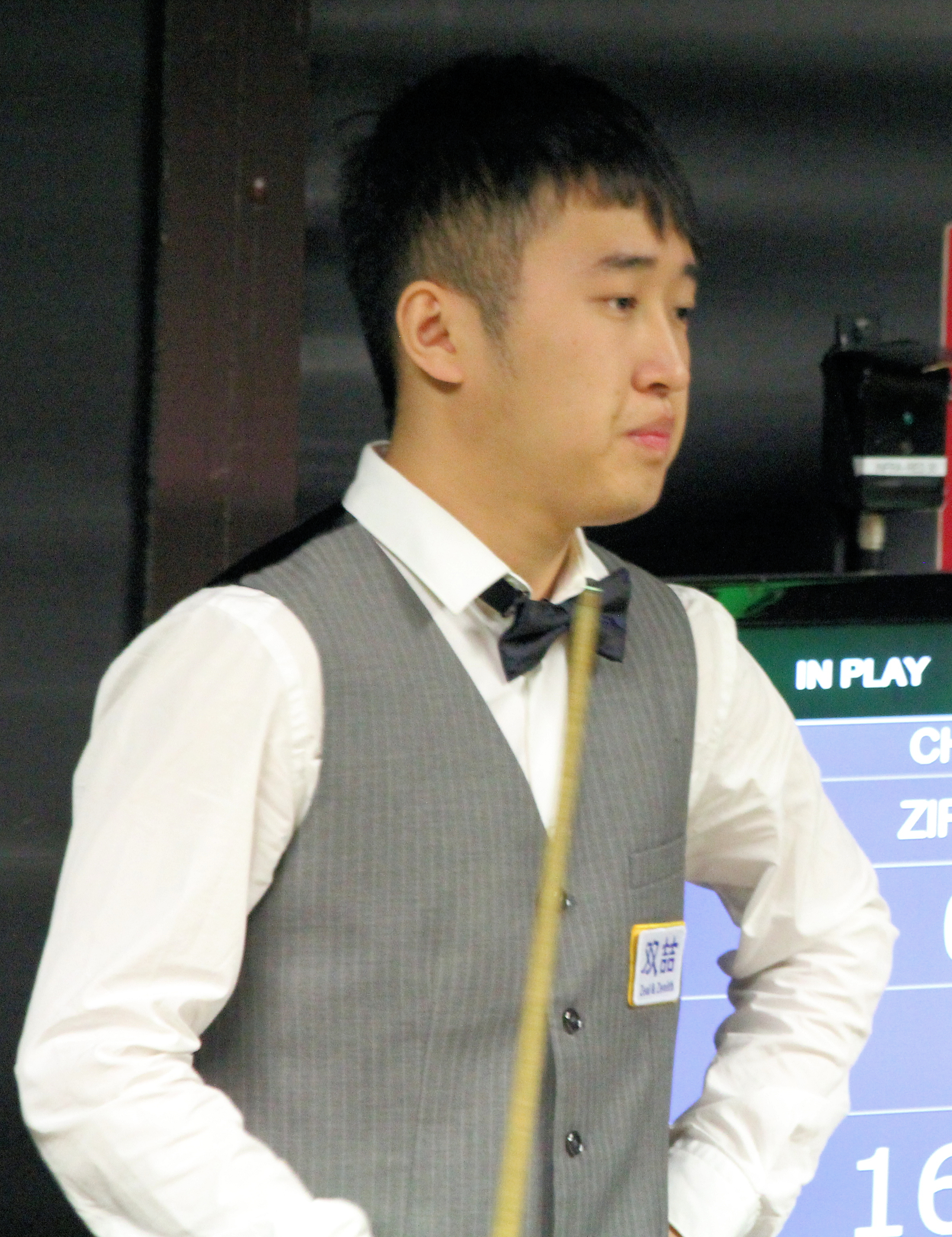
- Paul Hunter Classic 2018

Personal information
- Born: 17 September 1995 (age 31) Xi'an, Shaanxi, China

Sport
- Country: China
- Sport: Snooker
- Professional: 2017–2023
- Highest ranking: 76 (May 2021)
- Best ranking finish: Last 16 (x1)

Chen Zifan (Chinese: 陈子凡; born 17 September 1995) is a Chinese professional snooker player who, in 2023, received a five-year ban from professional competition after committing match-fixing offences.

In December 2022, Chen was suspended from the professional tour amid a match-fixing investigation. In January 2023, he was charged with fixing matches on the tour. In June 2023, he was banned from professional competition until 20 December 2027.

== Career ==
Chen Zifan started to play snooker aged 10, helped by his uncle, who ran a club in Xi'an. At first, his parents were reluctant, but after showing great talent, they allowed him to quit mainstream school at the age of 11 to concentrate on snooker. In 2008, Chen won third place in Chinese National Junior Championship.

Coached by former professional Liu Song, he began playing in minor-ranking Asian Players Tour Championship events. In 2012 he reached the last 64 in the Event 1 in Zhangjiagang where he lost 4–2 to Michael White.

In 2013, he won the China Youth Championship, beating Lu Ning. His strong results in junior tournaments earned him a wildcard appearance at the World Open. There he defeated Sanderson Lam before losing 5–0 to Judd Trump in the last 64. He was also a wildcard at the China Open, where he was defeated 5–2 by compatriot Yu Delu. He also qualified for the 2016 International Championship, defeating professional Tian Pengfei 6–3, and only narrowly losing in the first round to 6–5 to Liang Wenbo.

He moved to Shenzhen, where he was coached by Roger Leighton at the Wiraka Academy.

Between 2014 and 2017, Chen came very close to professional qualification. He finished 5th on the Asian Order of Merit in 2014-15 and 3rd in the Chinese amateur rankings in 2015-16 - in both cases just one place short of qualification. He also had an unsuccessful attempt at the 2016 Q School. Chen described these near-misses as 'very painful'.

Chen Zifan finally turned professional for the 2017–18 season after defeating Ben Jones 4–1 in the final round of the second event of the 2017 Q School.

=== 2017/2018 season ===
Chen's first match as a professional resulted in a 4–2 win over Ross Muir to qualify for the Riga Masters. However, a VISA problem meant he was unable to travel to the main competition. He followed this with a 5–3 win over Dominic Dale in the China Championship. His best wins of the season were against Barry Hawkins and Shaun Murphy.

Chen's first World Championship was a major disappointment. After the first session he trailed 9–0 against Noppon Saengkham. On resumption he won a respotted black to avoid the whitewash, punched the table in relief, and was warned by the referee. Saengkham won the match 10–1. Chen finished the season ranked 105.

=== 2018/2019 season ===
Chen's second season was a disaster. He won only 3 of his 20 matches, including 2 against amateurs. But he again beat Barry Hawkins (in the Northern Ireland Open). He finished the season ranked 101 and was relegated from the tour.

Chen came through the second event of the 2019 Q School dropping only 3 frames in his six matches to earn a new two-year card on the World Snooker Tour for the 2019–20 and 2020–21 seasons.

=== 2019/2020 season ===
At the Riga Masters Chen reached the last-16 for the first time by beating Andres Petrov and Ben Woollaston. He then lost to Yan Bingtao.

With the COVID-19 outbreak, the snooker season was suspended and Chen returned to China. Facing a multitude of travel and administrative hurdles, Chen did not return until the start of the next season, missing the World Championship. He finished the season ranked 105.

=== 2020/2021 season ===
Chen's best performance was a run to the 3rd round of the UK Championship, after 6-5 victories over Yuan Sijun and Yan Bingtao. He then lost 6–1 to Anthony McGill, but the ranking points gained played a major part in his tour survival. The following week at the Scottish Open he lost 4–0 to Mark King without potting a single ball.

At the World Championship, he needed a win to ensure professional survival via the 1-year list. This he achieved by beating Mitchell Mann 6–5, once again punching the table. He then lost 6–1 to Stuart Bingham. Chen finished the season ranked 76.

== Personal life ==
During the season, Chen Zifan lives in Sheffield where he practices at the Victoria Snooker Academy, managed by Victoria Shi.

== Performance and rankings timeline ==
Tournament	2012/ 13	2013/ 14	2014/ 15	2015/ 16	2016/ 17	2017/ 18	2018/ 19	2019/ 20	2020/ 21	2021/ 22	2022/ 23
Ranking (Note: It shows the ranking at the beginning of the season)	(Note: He was an amateur)					(Note: New players on the Main Tour don't have a ranking)	81	(Note: Players qualified through Q School started the season without ranking points)	79	(Note: Players qualified One Year Ranking List started the season without ranking points)	92
Ranking tournaments
Championship League	Non-Ranking Event								RR	RR	RR
European Masters	Tournament Not Held				A	2R	LQ	LQ	2R	LQ	LQ
British Open	Tournament Not Held									2R	1R
Northern Ireland Open	Tournament Not Held				A	2R	2R	2R	1R	LQ	1R
UK Championship	A	A	A	A	A	1R	1R	1R	3R	1R	LQ
Scottish Open	MR	Tournament Not Held			A	1R	1R	1R	1R	LQ	1R
English Open	Tournament Not Held				A	3R	1R	1R	1R	LQ	1R
World Grand Prix	Not Held		NR	DNQ	DNQ	DNQ	DNQ	DNQ	DNQ	DNQ	DNQ
Shoot Out	Non-Ranking Event				A	1R	1R	1R	WD	1R	A
German Masters	A	A	A	A	A	LQ	LQ	LQ	LQ	LQ	LQ
Welsh Open	A	A	A	A	A	2R	1R	2R	1R	LQ	A
Players Championship	DNQ	DNQ	DNQ	DNQ	DNQ	DNQ	DNQ	DNQ	DNQ	DNQ	DNQ
Tour Championship	Tournament Not Held						DNQ	DNQ	DNQ	DNQ	DNQ
World Championship	A	A	A	A	A	LQ	LQ	A	LQ	LQ	A
Non-ranking tournaments
Six-red World Championship	A	A	A	A	A	A	A	A	Not Held		WD
Former ranking tournaments
Wuxi Classic	A	A	1R	Tournament Not Held							
Shanghai Masters	A	A	WR	WR	WR	LQ	Non-Ranking		Tournament Not Held		
Paul Hunter Classic	Minor-Ranking Event				A	A	2R	NR	Tournament Not Held		
Indian Open	NH	A	A	NH	A	LQ	LQ	Tournament Not Held			
China Open	A	WR	A	A	A	LQ	LQ	Tournament Not Held			
Riga Masters	Not Held		Minor-Ranking		A	WD	LQ	3R	Tournament Not Held		
International Championship	A	A	A	WR	1R	LQ	LQ	LQ	Tournament Not Held		
China Championship	Tournament Not Held				NR	1R	LQ	LQ	Tournament Not Held		
World Open	A	1R	A	NH	A	LQ	LQ	LQ	Tournament Not Held		
WST Pro Series	Tournament Not Held								RR	Not Held	
Turkish Masters	Tournament Not Held									LQ	NH
Gibraltar Open	Tournament Not Held			MR	A	1R	2R	3R	3R	1R	NH
Former non-ranking tournaments
Haining Open	Not Held		Minor-Ranking		2R	A	A	A	NH	A	NH

Performance Table Legend
LQ	lost in the qualifying draw	#R	lost in the early rounds of the tournament (WR = Wildcard round, RR = Round robin)	QF	lost in the quarter-finals
SF	lost in the semi-finals	F	lost in the final	W	won the tournament
DNQ	did not qualify for the tournament	A	did not participate in the tournament	WD	withdrew from the tournament

NH / Not Held	means an event was not held.
NR / Non-Ranking Event	means an event is/was no longer a ranking event.
R / Ranking Event	means an event is/was a ranking event.
MR / Minor-Ranking Event	means an event is/was a minor-ranking event.
