= Zhao Jianbo =

Chinese snooker player (born 2003)

Personal information
- Born: 27 August 2003 (age 23) Dazhou, Sichuan, China

Sport
- Country: China
- Sport: Snooker
- Professional: 2020–2022
- Highest ranking: 74 (August 2021)
- Current ranking: (as of 4 October 2026)
- Best ranking finish: Last 32 (x4)

Zhao Jianbo (Chinese: 赵剑波; pinyin: Zhào Jiànbō, born 27 August 2003) is a Chinese former professional snooker player.

The WPBSA suspended Zhao from World Snooker Tour events in January 2023, amid a match-fixing investigation, and subsequently charged him with fixing a match. Following an independent disciplinary tribunal, Zhao was banned from professional competition for 2 years and 4 months, until 7 April 2025, and ordered to pay £7500 in costs.

== Career ==
As a result of Zhao's performances on the CBSA Tour, he was awarded a two-year card on the World Snooker Tour for the 2020–21 and 2021–22.

== Performance and rankings timeline ==
Tournament	2017/ 18	2018/ 19	2019/ 20	2020/ 21	2021/ 22	2022/ 23
Ranking (Note: It shows the ranking at the beginning of the season)	(Note: He was an amateur)			(Note: New players on the Main Tour don't have a ranking)	73	
Ranking tournaments
Championship League	Non-Ranking Event			RR	RR	RR
European Masters	A	A	A	1R	LQ	LQ
British Open	Tournament Not Held				2R	2R
Northern Ireland Open	A	A	A	3R	LQ	LQ
UK Championship	A	A	A	1R	1R	A
Scottish Open	A	A	A	3R	1R	LQ
English Open	A	A	A	2R	LQ	A
World Grand Prix	DNQ	DNQ	DNQ	DNQ	DNQ	DNQ
Shoot Out	A	A	A	WD	WD	A
German Masters	A	A	A	LQ	LQ	WD
Welsh Open	A	A	A	1R	1R	A
Players Championship	DNQ	DNQ	DNQ	DNQ	DNQ	DNQ
WST Classic	Tournament Not Held					A
Tour Championship	NH	DNQ	DNQ	DNQ	DNQ	DNQ
World Championship	A	A	A	LQ	LQ	A
Former ranking tournaments
International Championship	A	A	LQ	Tournament Not Held		
China Championship	A	A	1R	Tournament Not Held		
WST Pro Series	Tournament Not Held			RR	Not Held	
Turkish Masters	Tournament Not Held				LQ	NH
Gibraltar Open	A	A	A	3R	1R	NH
Former non-ranking tournaments
Shanghai Masters	R	A	1R	Tournament Not Held		
Haining Open	3R	2R	4R	NH	A	NH

Performance Table Legend
LQ	lost in the qualifying draw	#R	lost in the early rounds of the tournament (WR = Wildcard round, RR = Round robin)	QF	lost in the quarter-finals
SF	lost in the semi-finals	F	lost in the final	W	won the tournament
DNQ	did not qualify for the tournament	A	did not participate in the tournament	WD	withdrew from the tournament

NH / Not Held	means an event was not held.
NR / Non-Ranking Event	means an event is/was no longer a ranking event.
R / Ranking Event	means an event is/was a ranking event.
MR / Minor-Ranking Event	means an event is/was a minor-ranking event.

== Career finals ==
=== Pro-am finals: 1 ===
Outcome	No.	Year	Championship	Opponent in the final	Score
Runner–up	1.	2019	Xi'an Open	(China) Zhang Anda	3–5

=== Amateur finals: 2 (2 titles) ===
Outcome	No.	Year	Championship	Opponent in the final	Score
Winner	1.	2019	ACBS Asian Under-21 Snooker Championship	(Hong Kong) Cheung Ka Wai	6–3
Winner	2.	2019	IBSF World Under-21 Snooker Championship	(China) Pang Junxu	6–1
