= 2022 British Open =

Snooker tournament

2022 Cazoo British Open
Tournament information
- Dates: 26 September – 2 October 2022
- Venue: Marshall Arena
- City: Milton Keynes
- Country: England
- Organisation: World Snooker Tour
- Format: Ranking event
- Total prize fund: £478,000
- Winner's share: £100,000
- Highest break: Mark Selby (ENG) (147)

Final
- Champion: Ryan Day (WAL)
- Runner-up: Mark Allen (NIR)
- Score: 10–7

The 2022 British Open (officially the 2022 Cazoo British Open) was a professional snooker tournament that took place from 26 September to 2 October 2022 at the Marshall Arena in Milton Keynes, England. The third ranking tournament of the 2022–23 snooker season, it was organised by the World Snooker Tour and sponsored by car retailer Cazoo. Qualifying for the tournament took place from 9 to 14 August 2022 at the Robin Park Arena and Sports Centre in Wigan, although qualifiers featuring the top 16 players in the snooker world rankings were held over and played at the Marshall Arena. The event featured a total prize fund of £478,000, of which the winner received £100,000.

The draw was randomised after each round. All matches before the quarter-final stage were played as the best of seven frames, while the quarter-finals were best of nine frames, the semi-finals best of 11 frames, and the final best of 19 frames. Mark Williams was the defending champion, having defeated Gary Wilson 6–4 in the final of the 2021 event. Williams lost 1–4 to Ben Woollaston in the round of 64. Ryan Day won the tournament and the Clive Everton trophy, defeating Mark Allen 10–7 in the final to capture the fourth ranking title of his career. Day moved up from 27th to 16th place in the world rankings after his win, and secured a place in the following month's Champion of Champions invitational event. Mark Selby made the fourth maximum break of his career while playing Jack Lisowski in the round of 16. John Higgins made his 900th century break in professional competition in his round-of-64 match against Yuan Sijun, becoming the second player after Ronnie O'Sullivan to reach that milestone.

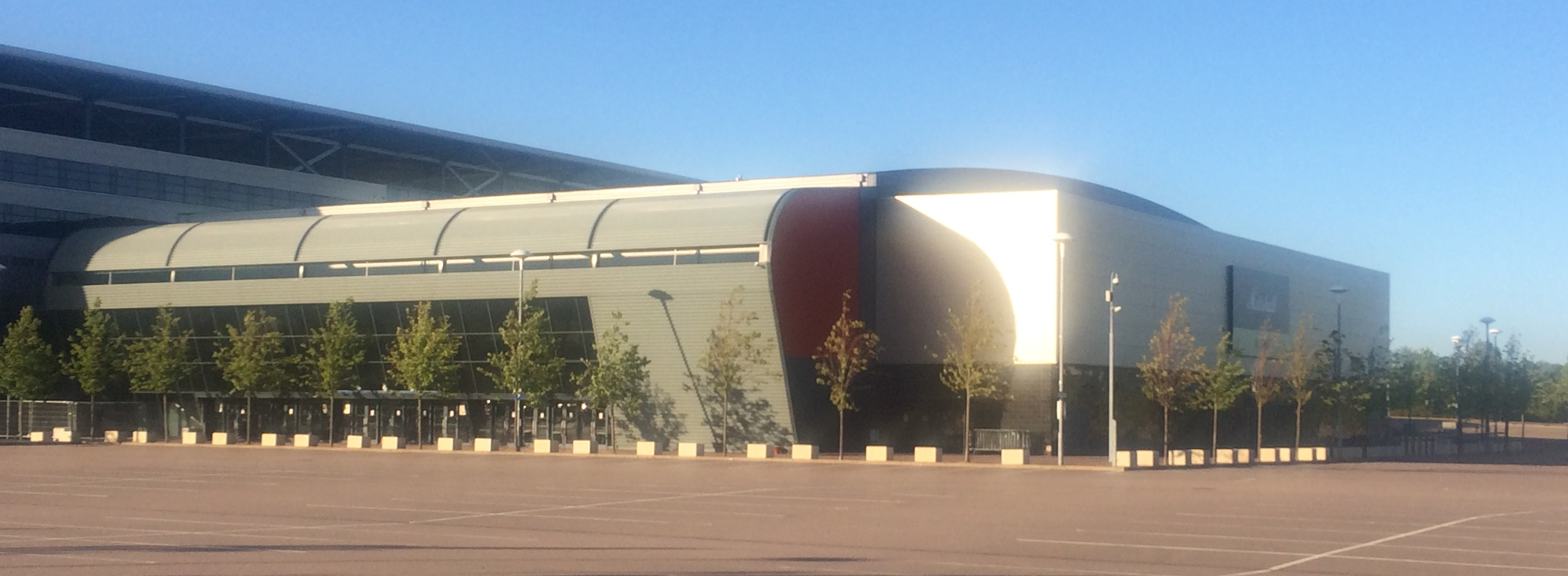
The main event took place at the Marshall Arena in Milton Keynes, England.

== Prize fund ==
The winner of the event received £100,000 from a total prize fund of £478,000. The breakdown of prize money for this event is shown below:

- Winner: £100,000
- Runner-up: £45,000
- Semi-final: £20,000
- Quarter-final: £12,000
- Last 16: £8,000
- Last 32: £5,000
- Last 64: £3,000
- Highest break: £5,000
- Total: £478,000

== Summary ==
=== Qualifying round ===
Qualifiers were held from 9 to 14 August at the Robin Park Arena and Sports Centre in Wigan, comprising round-of-128 matches that did not feature top-16 players. Ng On-yee fluked the final pink in the deciding frame to defeat 1997 world champion Ken Doherty 4–3, a victory she described as "one of the best of my career". Other veteran players Jimmy White and Stephen Hendry also lost their qualifiers as Anthony Hamilton whitewashed White 4–0, while Zhang Anda defeated Hendry 4–1. After serving a four-month suspension following a domestic assault conviction, Liang Wenbo returned to professional competition at the event but lost his qualifier 2–4 to Dean Young. Robbie Williams won a 68-minute deciding frame on the final black to defeat Ashley Hugill 4–3. Ali Carter suffered a surprise 1–4 defeat to world number 71 Hammad Miah, while Marco Fu lost by the same score to Cao Yupeng. Matthew Stevens defeated Stephen Maguire 4–1 and Jamie Clarke whitewashed Fan Zhengyi 4–0. Of the 22 Chinese players who competed in Wigan, 17 won their matches.

=== Early rounds ===
The remaining round-of-128 matches, featuring the top 16 players in the world rankings, were played at the Marshall Arena on 26 September. The reigning world champion and world number one Ronnie O'Sullivan lost 1–4 to Switzerland's Alexander Ursenbacher. It was the third time the Swiss player had beaten O'Sullivan in a ranking event, having previously defeated him at the 2019 Welsh Open and the 2020 UK Championship. Speaking in commentary, Hendry described O'Sullivan's performance as "rubbish" and "probably the worst I’ve seen Ronnie play for a good few years", while also saying that Ursenbacher had been "magnificent and took it to Ronnie from the word go". Defending champion Mark Williams defeated Estonia's Andres Petrov 4–1, in a match watched by the Estonian ambassador to the United Kingdom. Shaun Murphy was tied with the 2021 runner-up Gary Wilson at 3–3, and required just a pot on the final black ball to win the match. Murphy potted the ball, but went in-off to award the match to Wilson. Graeme Dott made a 139 break in defeating Luca Brecel 4–1, and Judd Trump also made a 139 while defeating Si Jiahui by the same score. John Higgins defeated Andy Hicks 4–2, although Hicks made breaks of 110 and 143 in the two frames he won.

The round of 64 was played on September 27 and 28. Higgins made his 900th century break in professional competition, becoming the second player (after O'Sullivan) to reach that milestone, although he lost his match 3–4 against Yuan Sijun. Higgins led 64–8 in the deciding frame but missed a red that would have left Yuan requiring a snooker, and Yuan eventually won the frame after clearing the colours. Higgins voiced his frustration after the match, calling the loss "unforgivable" and saying "You can add this to the list of so many times when I have collapsed near the finishing line". Zhao Xintong made breaks of 112, 128, 101, and 52 in his 4–1 defeat of Stuart Bingham, Dott made a 110 break while defeating fellow Scot Anthony McGill by the same score, and Lyu Haotian won the deciding frame on the colours to defeat David Gilbert 4–3. Ben Woollaston defeated Mark Williams 4–1. The defending champion, who admitted after his first match that he had practised minimally for the event, faced criticism from commentators Doherty and Hendry for his lack of preparation. Barry Hawkins defeated Kyren Wilson by the same score, making breaks of 72, 120, 78, and 134, while Jack Lisowski made a 132 break in his 4–2 win over Mitchell Mann. Trump whitewashed Young 4–0, making breaks of 52, 84, 100, and 64 in a match that lasted 61 minutes, while Ding Junhui made four half-centuries in his 4–1 win over Joe Perry. Although Mark Allen lost the first frame against Li Hang, he then won four consecutive frames with breaks of 63, 133, 100, and 83.

The round of 32 was played on September 28 and 29. Lisowski defeated Lu Ning 4–1, finishing the match with a 111 break. Selby defeated Cao 4–2, making breaks of 55, 90, and 109. Dott defeated Xiao Guodong 4–3, despite requiring two snookers in the deciding frame. Dott got the required foul points by laying snookers on the last red, and later cleared the colours to win the frame and match. Trump made a 130 break while whitewashing Xu Si 4–0, and reached the last 16 having lost just one frame in the tournament. Allen defeated Gary Wilson 4–2, making four half-centuries in the match. Zhao lost 1–4 to Noppon Saengkham, while Ding lost 2–4 to Robbie Williams. Jordan Brown defeated Yan Bingtao 4–3, making a break of 134.

The round of 16 was played on 29 September. In the opening frame of his match with Lisowski, Selby made a maximum break, the fourth of his career and his first since 2018. With four reds remaining, Selby ran out of position, but recovered with a treble on a red to a middle pocket. He went on to defeat Lisowski 4–1. Trump came from 0–2 behind against Allen to force a deciding frame, but Allen won the match 4–3 after twice unintentionally snookering Trump in the decider. Jamie Jones defeated Woollaston 4–2 to reach the quarter-finals, having reached the same stage at the previous month's European Masters. Saengkham whitewashed Brown 4–0, while Lyu defeated Stevens 4–1, making breaks of 141 and 131. Robbie Williams came from 2–3 behind against amateur Steven Hallworth to win the match with a 134 total clearance in the deciding frame. Yuan defeated Hamilton in a decider, while Ryan Day defeated Dott 4–2.

=== Later rounds ===
The quarter-finals were played on 30 September as the best of nine frames. Allen made century breaks of 143 and 126 in his match against Selby, who also made two centuries, 123 and 109. After tying the scores at 3–3, Selby led 51–12 in the seventh frame before missing a long pot on a red. Allen won the frame with a 47 break, and went on to make a match-winning century in the eighth frame for a 5–3 victory. Robbie Williams defeated Lyu to reach the third ranking semi-final of his career. After losing the first frame, Williams trailed by 0–55 in the second, but recovered to win the frame on the colours; he then won another four consecutive frames for a 5–1 victory. Saengkham defeated Jones 5–3, also reaching the third ranking semi-final of his career, while Day defeated Yuan 5–4, making a 124 total clearance in the deciding frame.

The semi-finals were played on 1 October as the best of 11 frames. In his match against Saengkham, Allen made breaks of 69, 76, 133, 69, and 56 to take a 5–0 lead, while his opponent scored just 11 points in the first five frames. In the sixth frame, Allen missed a red while on a break of 44, allowing Saengkham to avoid a whitewash with a clearance of 48. Saengkham had another chance to make a winning clearance in the seventh frame, but missed the final green, after which Allen clinched a 6–1 victory. In the other semi-final, Day came from 2–4 behind against Robbie Williams to win three consecutive frames and lead 5–4, but Williams won the 10th frame to force a decider. However, Day won the deciding frame with a break of 45 after his opponent misjudged a safety shot.

The final was played on 2 October as a best-of-19-frames match, held over two sessions, between world number 14 Allen and world number 27 Day. Allen was contesting his 14th ranking final, while Day was competing in his ninth. Allen won the first frame with a 126 break, but Day made breaks of 58, 77, and 73 to take a 2–1 lead. Allen won the fourth and fifth frames with breaks of 75 and 105 to lead 3–2, but Day won frames six and seven for a 4–3 advantage. Allen won the eighth and final frame of the session to tie the scores at 4–4. The afternoon session featured two centuries and six half-centuries. In the evening session, the scores were tied at 6–6 at the mid-session interval. Allen won the 13th frame on the pink to take the lead, but Day came from 6–7 behind to win four consecutive frames, with breaks including 74, 70, and 84, to secure a 10–7 victory. It was his fourth ranking title, while the £100,000 top prize was the largest of his career. Winning the tournament took him to number 16 in the world rankings and earned him a place in the following month's Champion of Champions invitational event. Day called the victory "the biggest win of my life" and said he was "delighted I finished the match off". Allen remarked that he believed table conditions had changed in the evening session, stating "I just completely lost my action and faith in the table. Ryan [Day] adapted better than I did and probably deserved to win".

== Main draw ==
Players in bold denote match winners.

=== Round 1 ===
The first round (last 64) was played from 27 to 28 September, as the best of 7 frames.

==== 27 September – morning session ====
- John Astley (ENG) w/d–**w/o** **Chang Bingyu** (CHN)
- **Graeme Dott** (SCO) **4**–1 Anthony McGill (SCO)
- David Gilbert (ENG) 3–**4** **Lyu Haotian** (CHN)
- Zhang Jiankang (CHN) 3–**4** **Jak Jones** (WAL)

==== 27 September – afternoon session ====
- **Zhao Xintong** (CHN) **4**–1 Stuart Bingham (ENG)
- **Jordan Brown** (NIR) **4**–1 Ng On-yee (HKG)
- **Lu Ning** (CHN) **4**–1 Zhou Yuelong (CHN)
- **Xiao Guodong** (CHN) **4**–1 Peter Lines (ENG)
- **Mark Selby** (ENG) **4**–1 Mark Joyce (ENG)
- John Higgins (SCO) 3–**4** **Yuan Sijun** (CHN)
- Dylan Emery (WAL) 2–**4** **Cao Yupeng** (CHN)
- **Craig Steadman** (ENG) **4**–3 Ben Mertens (BEL)

==== 27 September – evening session ====
- Kyren Wilson (ENG) 1–**4** **Barry Hawkins** (ENG)
- **Robbie Williams** (ENG) **4**–1 Lukas Kleckers (GER)
- **Jack Lisowski** (ENG) **4**–2 Mitchell Mann (ENG)
- **Anthony Hamilton** (ENG) **4**–1 Jamie Clarke (WAL)
- **Steven Hallworth** (ENG) **4**–0 Hammad Miah (ENG)
- **Ben Woollaston** (ENG) **4**–1 Mark Williams (WAL)
- **Jamie Jones** (WAL) **4**–1 Elliot Slessor (ENG)
- Alexander Ursenbacher (SUI) 1–**4** **Joe O'Connor** (ENG)

==== 28 September – morning session ====
- Andy Lee (HKG) 0–**4** **Yan Bingtao** (CHN)
- Thepchaiya Un-Nooh (THA) 2–**4** **Matthew Stevens** (WAL)
- David Grace (ENG) 2–**4** **Xu Si** (CHN)
- Chen Zifan (CHN) 3–**4** **Ross Muir** (SCO)

==== 28 September – afternoon session ====
- Dean Young (SCO) 0–**4** **Judd Trump** (ENG)
- Li Hang (CHN) 1–**4** **Mark Allen** (NIR)
- **Noppon Saengkham** (THA) **4**–0 Fraser Patrick (SCO)
- Tian Pengfei (CHN) 1–**4** **Jimmy Robertson** (ENG)
- **Ding Junhui** (CHN) **4**–1 Joe Perry (ENG)
- **Gary Wilson** (ENG) **4**–0 Zhang Anda (CHN)
- Gerard Greene (NIR) 1–**4** **Ryan Day** (WAL)
- **Zhao Jianbo** (CHN) **4**–1 Ian Burns (ENG)

=== Round 2 ===
The second round (last 32) was played from 28 to 29 September, as the best of 7 frames.

==== 28 September – evening session ====
- **Jamie Jones** (WAL) **4**–1 Chang Bingyu (CHN)
- **Mark Selby** (ENG) **4**–2 Cao Yupeng (CHN)
- **Ben Woollaston** (ENG) **4**–1 Jak Jones (WAL)
- **Graeme Dott** (SCO) **4**–3 Xiao Guodong (CHN)
- Lu Ning (CHN) 1–**4** **Jack Lisowski** (ENG)
- Ross Muir (SCO) 0–**4** **Lyu Haotian** (CHN)
- Barry Hawkins (ENG) 3–**4** **Steven Hallworth** (ENG)
- **Anthony Hamilton** (ENG) **4**–3 Joe O'Connor (ENG)

==== 29 September – afternoon session ====
- Jimmy Robertson (ENG) 1–**4** **Ryan Day** (WAL)
- Zhao Xintong (CHN) 1–**4** **Noppon Saengkham** (THA)
- Ding Junhui (CHN) 2–**4** **Robbie Williams** (ENG)
- Craig Steadman (ENG) 2–**4** **Matthew Stevens** (WAL)
- Xu Si (CHN) 0–**4** **Judd Trump** (ENG)
- Yan Bingtao (CHN) 3–**4** **Jordan Brown** (NIR)
- Gary Wilson (ENG) 2–**4** **Mark Allen** (NIR)
- Zhao Jianbo (CHN) 1–**4** **Yuan Sijun** (CHN)

=== Round 3 ===
The third round (last 16) was played on 29 September, as the best of 7 frames.

==== 29 September – evening session ====
- **Lyu Haotian** (CHN) **4**–1 Matthew Stevens (WAL)
- **Mark Selby** (ENG) **4**–1 Jack Lisowski (ENG)
- **Robbie Williams** (ENG) **4**–3 Steven Hallworth (ENG)
- **Jamie Jones** (WAL) **4**–2 Ben Woollaston (ENG)
- Anthony Hamilton (ENG) 3–**4** **Yuan Sijun** (CHN)
- **Noppon Saengkham** (THA) **4**–0 Jordan Brown (NIR)
- **Mark Allen** (NIR) **4**–3 Judd Trump (ENG)
- Graeme Dott (SCO) 2–**4** **Ryan Day** (WAL)

=== Quarter-finals ===
The quarter-finals were played on 30 September, as the best of 9 frames.

- **Robbie Williams** (ENG) **5**–1 Lyu Haotian (CHN)
- Mark Selby (ENG) 3–**5** **Mark Allen** (NIR)
- **Ryan Day** (WAL) **5**–4 Yuan Sijun (CHN)
- **Noppon Saengkham** (THA) **5**–3 Jamie Jones (WAL)

=== Semi-finals ===
The semi-finals were played on 1 October, as the best of 11 frames.

- **Mark Allen** (NIR) **6**–1 Noppon Saengkham (THA)
- **Ryan Day** (WAL) **6**–5 Robbie Williams (ENG)

=== Final ===
Final: Best of 19 frames. Referee: Maike Kesseler; Marshall Arena, Milton Keynes, England, 2 October 2022.
Mark Allen; Northern Ireland	7–**10**	**Ryan Day**; Wales
Afternoon: **126**–0 (126), 0–**135**, 0–**77**, **75**–12, **105**–0 (105), 36–**91**, 15–**76**, **60**–0; Evening: **81**–37, 1–**67**, **66**–6, 0–**86**, **65**–57, 15–**78**, 25–**96**, 0–**84**, 39–**69**
**126**	Highest break	84
**2**	Century breaks	0

== Qualifying ==
Qualifying for the event took place between 9 and 14 August 2022 at the Robin Park Arena and Sports Centre in Wigan, England. Qualifying matches involving the top 16 players were held over to be played at the Marshall Arena in Milton Keynes. Qualifying matches were played as best of 7 frames. Players highlighted in bold denote match winners.

=== Milton Keynes ===
The results of the held-over qualifying matches played in Milton Keynes on 26 September were as follows:

==== Afternoon session ====
- **Mark Williams** (WAL) **4**–1 Andres Petrov (EST)
- Ricky Walden (ENG) 1–**4** **Mark Selby** (ENG)
- **Yan Bingtao** (CHN) **4**–2 Oliver Brown (ENG)
- **Anthony McGill** (SCO) **4**–1 Wu Yize (CHN)
- Lei Peifan (CHN) 0–**4** **Stuart Bingham** (ENG)
- Bai Langning (CHN) 1–**4** **Zhao Xintong** (CHN)
- **Graeme Dott** (SCO) **4**–1 Luca Brecel (BEL)
- Shaun Murphy (ENG) 3–**4** **Gary Wilson** (ENG)

==== Evening session ====
- Andy Hicks (ENG) 2–**4** **John Higgins** (SCO)
- Dominic Dale (WAL) 1–**4** **Jack Lisowski** (ENG)
- Mark Davis (ENG) 0–**4** **Kyren Wilson** (ENG)
- **Alexander Ursenbacher** (SUI) **4**–1 Ronnie O'Sullivan (ENG)
- **Joe Perry** (ENG) **4**–0 Hossein Vafaei (IRN)
- **Judd Trump** (ENG) **4**–1 Si Jiahui (CHN)
- **Mark Allen** (NIR) **4**–0 Stuart Carrington (ENG)
- Duane Jones (WAL) 3–**4** **Barry Hawkins** (ENG)

=== Wigan ===
The results of the qualifying matches played in Wigan were as follows:

==== 9 August ====
- Mink Nutcharut (THA) 2–**4** **Chen Zifan** (CHN)
- Himanshu Jain (IND) 2–**4** **Xu Si** (CHN)
- Stephen Hendry (SCO) 1–**4** **Zhang Anda** (CHN)
- **Zhao Jianbo** (CHN) **4**–3 Jackson Page (WAL)
- Julien Leclercq (BEL) 2–**4** **Steven Hallworth** (ENG)
- Ashley Hugill (ENG) 3–**4** **Robbie Williams** (ENG)
- Liam Highfield (ENG) 0–**4** **Li Hang** (CHN)
- Ryan Thomerson (AUS) 1–**4** **Ben Mertens** (BEL)

==== 10 August ====
- **Tian Pengfei** (CHN) **4**–2 Sam Craigie (ENG)
- Matthew Selt (ENG) 3–**4** **Lu Ning** (CHN)
- Mark King (ENG) 1–**4** **Lyu Haotian** (CHN)
- **Ding Junhui** (CHN) **4**–2 Oliver Lines (ENG)
- **Gerard Greene** (NIR) **4**–2 Sanderson Lam (ENG)
- Jamie O'Neill (ENG) 1–**4** **David Grace** (ENG)
- Adam Duffy (ENG) 1–**4** **Ian Burns** (ENG)
- Allan Taylor (ENG) 3–**4** **Lukas Kleckers** (GER)

==== 11 August ====
- **Yuan Sijun** (CHN) **4**–1 Anton Kazakov (UKR)
- Liang Wenbo (CHN) 2–**4** **Dean Young** (SCO)
- **Fraser Patrick** (SCO) **4**–1 Alfie Burden (ENG)
- **Ng On-yee** (HKG) **4**–3 Ken Doherty (IRL)
- **Thepchaiya Un-Nooh** (THA) **4**–1 Martin Gould (ENG)
- **John Astley** (ENG) **4**–3 Rod Lawler (ENG)
- **Joe O'Connor** (ENG) **4**–1 Chris Wakelin (ENG)
- Michael Judge (IRL) 3–**4** **Craig Steadman** (ENG)

==== 12 August ====
- **Zhang Jiankang** (CHN) **4**–0 Reanne Evans (ENG)
- Jenson Kendrick (ENG) 1–**4** **Zhou Yuelong** (CHN)
- **David Gilbert** (ENG) **4**–0 Aaron Hill (IRL)
- Zak Surety (ENG) 0–**4** **Ross Muir** (SCO)
- Rebecca Kenna (ENG) 1–**4** **Ryan Day** (WAL)
- **Andy Lee** (HKG) **4**–3 Barry Pinches (ENG)
- **Jamie Jones** (WAL) **4**–1 Scott Donaldson (SCO)
- **Anthony Hamilton** (ENG) **4**–0 Jimmy White (ENG)

==== 13 August ====
- Fan Zhengyi (CHN) 0–**4** **Jamie Clarke** (WAL)
- **Cao Yupeng** (CHN) **4**–1 Marco Fu (HKG)
- Peng Yisong (CHN) 0–**4** **Dylan Emery** (WAL)
- **Ben Woollaston** (ENG) **4**–2 James Cahill (ENG)
- Tom Ford (ENG) 3–**4** **Mitchell Mann** (ENG)
- **Elliot Slessor** (ENG) **4**–3 Sean O'Sullivan (ENG)
- **Hammad Miah** (ENG) **4**–1 Ali Carter (ENG)
- **Mark Joyce** (ENG) **4**–0 Daniel Wells (WAL)

==== 14 August ====
- Fergal O'Brien (IRL) 1–**4** **Chang Bingyu** (CHN)
- **Jimmy Robertson** (ENG) **4**–3 Louis Heathcote (ENG)
- **Xiao Guodong** (CHN) **4**–1 David Lilley (ENG)
- Pang Junxu (CHN) 3–**4** **Jordan Brown** (NIR)
- **Jak Jones** (WAL) **4**–2 Andrew Pagett (WAL)
- **Matthew Stevens** (WAL) **4**–1 Stephen Maguire (SCO)
- **Peter Lines** (ENG) **4**–0 Robert Milkins (ENG)
- Michael White (WAL) 3–**4** **Noppon Saengkham** (THA)

== Century breaks ==
=== Main stage centuries ===
During the main stages there was 62 century breaks, the highest being a maximum break made by Selby in his win over Lisowski.

- 147, 123, 117, 110, 109, 103 – Mark Selby
- 143, 133, 133, 126, 126, 105, 105, 100 – Mark Allen
- 143, 110 – Andy Hicks
- 143 – David Grace
- 141, 131 – Lyu Haotian
- 139, 110 – Graeme Dott
- 139, 130, 109, 100 – Judd Trump
- 139, 125, 125 – Jamie Jones
- 138, 135, 126, 102 – Anthony Hamilton
- 137 – Gary Wilson
- 134, 120, 102 – Barry Hawkins
- 134, 112 – Jordan Brown
- 134 – Robbie Williams
- 132, 132 – John Higgins
- 132, 119, 111 – Jack Lisowski
- 128, 112, 101 – Zhao Xintong
- 124, 103 – Ryan Day
- 119 – Xiao Guodong
- 117, 101 – Yan Bingtao
- 117 – Ben Mertens
- 116, 113, 102 – Noppon Saengkham
- 113 – Yuan Sijun
- 112 – Shaun Murphy
- 108 – Steven Hallworth
- 104 – Matthew Stevens
- 103 – David Gilbert
- 101 – Craig Steadman

=== Qualifying stage centuries ===
During the qualifying stage, 25 century breaks were made, the highest being a 130 made by three players.

- 130, 107 – Li Hang
- 130 – Steven Hallworth
- 130 – Ben Woollaston
- 129 – Ian Burns
- 128 – Ding Junhui
- 128 – Ross Muir
- 127 – Joe O'Connor
- 122 – Matthew Selt
- 121 – John Astley
- 111, 110 – Lukas Kleckers
- 109, 104 – Noppon Saengkham
- 109, 103 – Julien Leclercq
- 105 – Zhao Jianbo
- 103 – Elliot Slessor
- 102 – Pang Junxu
- 101 – Ashley Hugill
- 100 – Chang Bingyu
- 100 – David Gilbert
- 100 – Anthony Hamilton
- 100 – Louis Heathcote
- 100 – Andrew Pagett
