= 2016 International Championship =

Tournament information
- Dates: 23–30 October 2016
- Venue: Baihu Media Broadcasting Centre
- City: Daqing
- Country: China
- Organisation: World Snooker
- Format: Ranking event
- Total prize fund: £657,000
- Winner's share: £125,000
- Highest break: John Higgins (SCO) (145); Xu Si (CHN) (145)

Final
- Champion: Mark Selby (ENG)
- Runner-up: Ding Junhui (CHN)
- Score: 10–1

The 2016 International Championship was a professional ranking snooker tournament that took place between 23 and 30 October 2016 at the Baihu Media Broadcasting Centre in Daqing, China. It was the eighth ranking event of the 2016/2017 season.

John Higgins was the defending champion but he lost 2–6 to Ding Junhui in the quarter-finals.

Mark Selby won his 9th ranking title by beating Ding Junhui 10–1 in the final. This match was a repeat of the 2016 World Championship final, in which Selby beat Ding by the 18–14 scoreline, and also the second consecutive ranking event final in China to feature both players, previous one, at the Shanghai Masters, being won 10–6 by Ding.

== Prize fund ==
The breakdown of prize money for this year is shown below:

- Winner: £125,000
- Runner-up: £65,000
- Semi-final: £30,000
- Quarter-final: £17,500
- Last 16: £12,000
- Last 32: £7,000
- Last 64: £4,000
- Televised highest break: £1,000
- Total: £657,000

The "rolling 147 prize" for a maximum break stood at £5,000.

== Wildcard round ==
These matches were played in Daqing on 23 October 2016.

Match		Score	
WC1	Ian Burns (ENG)	3–6	Yuan Sijun (CHN)
WC2	Wang Yuchen (CHN)	5–6	Xu Si (CHN)
WC3	Ross Muir (SCO)	3–6	Zhang Jiankang (CHN)
WC4	Tian Pengfei (CHN)	3–6	Chen Zifan (CHN)

== Main draw ==
Last 64; Best of 11 frames
(Scotland) John Higgins	6
(Scotland) Eden Sharav	3
(Wales) Jak Jones	6
(England) Jimmy Robertson	4
(England) Martin Gould	3
(England) Mark Joyce	6
(Scotland) Anthony McGill	3
(China) Zhou Yuelong	6
(Wales) Matthew Stevens	6
(England) Chris Wakelin	1
(England) David Grace	1
(China) Ding Junhui	6
(Republic of Ireland) Fergal O'Brien	1
(Scotland) Graeme Dott	6
(Republic of Ireland) Ken Doherty	3
(England) Ricky Walden	6
(England) Judd Trump	6
(China) Yuan Sijun	3
(China) Zhao Xintong	3
(England) Tom Ford	6
(Wales) Mark Williams	5
(China) Xu Si	6
(England) David Gilbert	3
(Thailand) James Wattana	6
(England) Sam Baird	6
(Wales) Michael White	2
(Thailand) Sunny Akani	4
(Hong Kong) Marco Fu	6
(England) Mike Dunn	2
(China) Yan Bingtao	6
(Finland) Robin Hull	4
(England) Shaun Murphy	6
(England) Stuart Bingham	6
(China) Zhang Jiankang	1
(Belgium) Luca Brecel	4
(Wales) Dominic Dale	6
(England) Ali Carter	6
(England) Robbie Williams	3
(Scotland) Stephen Maguire	6
(England) Rod Lawler	2
(Norway) Kurt Maflin	6
(England) Matthew Selt	2
(China) Xiao Guodong	4
(England) Ronnie O'Sullivan	6
(Wales) Jamie Jones	2
(England) Michael Holt	6
(England) Stuart Carrington	2
(Wales) Daniel Wells	6
(Australia) Neil Robertson	6
(England) Oliver Lines	0
(England) Anthony Hamilton	6
(England) Gary Wilson	2
(England) Joe Perry	6
(England) Andrew Higginson	5
(Wales) Ryan Day	2
(India) Aditya Mehta	6
(China) Chen Zifan	5
(China) Liang Wenbo	6
(China) Li Hang	6
(Wales) Lee Walker	1
(England) Mark King	4
(England) John Astley	6
(England) Alfie Burden	2
(England) Mark Selby	6

Last 32; Best of 11 frames
(Scotland) John Higgins	6
(Wales) Jak Jones	2
(England) Mark Joyce	4
(China) Zhou Yuelong	6
(Wales) Matthew Stevens	2
(China) Ding Junhui	6
(Scotland) Graeme Dott	4
(England) Ricky Walden	6
(England) Judd Trump	6
(England) Tom Ford	1
(China) Xu Si	4
(Thailand) James Wattana	6
(England) Sam Baird	6
(Hong Kong) Marco Fu	4
(China) Yan Bingtao	5
(England) Shaun Murphy	6
(England) Stuart Bingham	6
(Wales) Dominic Dale	2
(England) Ali Carter	6
(Scotland) Stephen Maguire	5
(Norway) Kurt Maflin	4
(England) Ronnie O'Sullivan	6
(England) Michael Holt	6
(Wales) Daniel Wells	5
(Australia) Neil Robertson	6
(England) Anthony Hamilton	4
(England) Joe Perry	6
(India) Aditya Mehta	3
(China) Liang Wenbo	6
(China) Li Hang	1
(England) John Astley	2
(England) Mark Selby	6

Last 16; Best of 11 frames
(Scotland) John Higgins	6
(China) Zhou Yuelong	2
(China) Ding Junhui	6
(England) Ricky Walden	5
(England) Judd Trump	6
(Thailand) James Wattana	3
(England) Sam Baird	1
(England) Shaun Murphy	6
(England) Stuart Bingham	6
(England) Ali Carter	1
(England) Ronnie O'Sullivan	4
(England) Michael Holt	6
(Australia) Neil Robertson	2
(England) Joe Perry	6
(China) Liang Wenbo	5
(England) Mark Selby	6

Quarter-finals; Best of 11 frames
(Scotland) John Higgins	2
(China) Ding Junhui	6
(England) Judd Trump	6
(England) Shaun Murphy	5
(England) Stuart Bingham	6
(England) Michael Holt	5
(England) Joe Perry	3
(England) Mark Selby	6

Semi-finals; Best of 17 frames
(China) Ding Junhui	9
(England) Judd Trump	4
(England) Stuart Bingham	3
(England) Mark Selby	9

Final; Best of 19 frames
(China) Ding Junhui	1
(England) Mark Selby	10

== Final ==
Final: Best of 19 frames. Referee: Peggy Li. Baihu Media Broadcasting Centre, Daqing, China, 30 October 2016.
Ding Junhui; China	1–10	Mark Selby; England
Afternoon: 5–94 (87), 0–83 (83), 54–62, 70–58, 16–79 (67), 5–68, 29–71 (66), 7–82, 1–69 (50); Evening: 54–62 (62), 0–78 (78)
47	Highest break	87
0	Century breaks	0
0	50+ breaks	7

== Qualifying ==
These matches were held between 29 September and 1 October 2016 at the Preston Guild Hall in Preston, England. Matches involved John Higgins, Ding Junhui, Liang Wenbo and Mark Selby, were played on 23 October 2016 in China. All matches were best of 11 frames.

(Scotland) John Higgins	6–0	(England) Sydney Wilson
(England) Nigel Bond	3–6	(Scotland) Eden Sharav
(Thailand) Thepchaiya Un-Nooh	5–6	(Wales) Jak Jones
(England) Jimmy Robertson	6–0	(England) Bradley Jones
(England) Martin Gould	6–2	(Scotland) Scott Donaldson
(England) Mark Joyce	6–1	(Isle of Man) Darryl Hill
(Scotland) Anthony McGill	6–3	(Malaysia) Rory Thor
(China) Zhou Yuelong	6–3	(England) Steven Hallworth
(Wales) Matthew Stevens	6–3	(England) Adam Duffy
(Scotland) Alan McManus	4–6	(England) Chris Wakelin
(England) David Grace	6–1	(Scotland) Rhys Clark
(China) Ding Junhui	6–5	(England) Mitchell Mann
(Republic of Ireland) Fergal O'Brien	6–3	(Scotland) Fraser Patrick
(Scotland) Graeme Dott	6–1	(Wales) David John
(Republic of Ireland) Ken Doherty	6–2	(England) Allan Taylor
(England) Ricky Walden	6–4	(England) Ashley Hugill
(England) Judd Trump	6–2	(Iran) Hossein Vafaei
(England) Ian Burns	6–2	(China) Lü Chenwei
(England) Ben Woollaston	4–6	(China) Zhao Xintong
(England) Tom Ford	6–3	(England) Brandon Sargeant
(Wales) Mark Williams	6–2	(Malta) Alex Borg
(England) Rory McLeod	1–6	(China) Wang Yuchen
(England) David Gilbert	6–0	(Wales) Gareth Allen
(Thailand) Dechawat Poomjaeng	4–6	(Thailand) James Wattana
(England) Sam Baird	6–3	(Cyprus) Michael Georgiou
(Wales) Michael White	6–4	(China) Zhang Yong
(Northern Ireland) Joe Swail	4–6	(Thailand) Sunny Akani
(Hong Kong) Marco Fu	6–1	(England) Andy Hicks
(England) Mike Dunn	6–2	(England) Jason Weston
(England) Mark Davis	2–6	(China) Yan Bingtao
(Finland) Robin Hull	6–3	(England) Daniel Womersley
(England) Shaun Murphy	6–2	(Thailand) Kritsanut Lertsattayathorn

(England) Stuart Bingham	6–2	(England) Peter Lines
(China) Yu Delu	1–6	(Scotland) Ross Muir
(Belgium) Luca Brecel	6–2	(China) Fang Xiongman
(Wales) Dominic Dale	6–5	(Thailand) Boonyarit Keattikun
(England) Ali Carter	6–4	(China) Chen Zhe
(England) Robbie Williams	6–5	(China) Zhang Anda
(Scotland) Stephen Maguire	6–2	(England) Michael Wild
(England) Rod Lawler	6–0	(England) David Lilley
(Norway) Kurt Maflin	6–2	(England) Sanderson Lam
(England) Matthew Selt	6–1	(Pakistan) Hamza Akbar
(China) Xiao Guodong	6–4	(England) Hammad Miah
(England) Ronnie O'Sullivan	6–4	(England) James Cahill
(Wales) Jamie Jones	6–4	(China) Cao Yupeng
(England) Michael Holt	6–1	(England) Elliot Slessor
(England) Stuart Carrington	6–0	(Australia) Kurt Dunham
(Northern Ireland) Mark Allen	5–6	(Wales) Daniel Wells
(Australia) Neil Robertson	6–5	(England) Sam Craigie
(England) Oliver Lines	6–4	(England) Liam Highfield
(England) Robert Milkins	5–6	(England) Anthony Hamilton
(England) Gary Wilson	6–3	(England) Craig Steadman
(England) Joe Perry	6–1	(England) Christopher Keogan
(England) Andrew Higginson	6–3	(England) Jimmy White
(Wales) Ryan Day	6–0	(England) Louis Heathcote
(England) Jack Lisowski	4–6	(India) Aditya Mehta
(China) Tian Pengfei	6–0	(Thailand) Noppon Saengkham
(China) Liang Wenbo	6–5	(China) Mei Xiwen
(China) Li Hang	6–5	(England) Sean O'Sullivan
(England) Barry Hawkins	4–6	(Wales) Lee Walker
(England) Mark King	6–3	(England) Jamie Cope
(England) Peter Ebdon	3–6	(England) John Astley
(England) Alfie Burden	6–2	(Wales) Duane Jones
(England) Mark Selby	6–4	(England) Paul Davison

== Century breaks ==
=== Qualifying stage centuries ===
- 138 – Ken Doherty
- 136 – Jack Lisowski
- 135 – Anthony McGill
- 134 – Robin Hull
- 130 – Shaun Murphy
- 130 – Chen Zhe
- 128, 122, 107 – Ali Carter
- 128, 121 – Jak Jones
- 127, 100 – Judd Trump
- 126 – Mark Williams
- 118 – Tom Ford
- 109 – Martin Gould
- 108 – Jimmy Robertson
- 106, 105 – Stephen Maguire
- 105 – Ryan Day
- 104 – Hossein Vafaei
- 102 – Mark Davis
- 102 – David Grace
- 100 – Stuart Carrington
- 100 – Michael White
- 100 – Ben Woollaston

=== Televised stage centuries ===
- 145 – John Higgins
- 145 – Xu Si
- 139, 136 – Li Hang
- 137, 136, 101 – Joe Perry
- 137, 133, 125, 120, 119, 108, 102, 102, 100 – Judd Trump
- 137, 101 – Ronnie O'Sullivan
- 137 – Mark Joyce
- 135, 129, 104, 101 – Liang Wenbo
- 134, 130, 125, 121, 116, 104, 102 – Ding Junhui
- 134, 111 – John Astley
- 133 – Ken Doherty
- 132, 127, 125, 122, 103, 100 – Mark Selby
- 132, 104 – Stephen Maguire
- 132 – Tom Ford
- 131, 127, 125, 101 – Stuart Bingham
- 130, 124, 106 – Ricky Walden
- 127, 101 – Michael Holt
- 124, 115 – Kurt Maflin
- 123, 107 – Neil Robertson
- 120 – Eden Sharav
- 114 – Jak Jones
- 114 – Mark Williams
- 113 – Dominic Dale
- 112 – Wang Yuchen
- 110 – Sunny Akani
- 106, 102 – Sam Baird
- 106, 102 – Zhou Yuelong
- 105, 104 – Aditya Mehta
- 102 – David Grace
- 102 – Marco Fu
- 101 – Ross Muir
- 101 – Shaun Murphy
