= China Championship (snooker) =

Snooker tournament

Tournament information
- Location: Guangzhou
- Country: China
- Established: 2016
- Organisation(s): WPBSA
- Format: Ranking event
- Total prize fund: £751,000
- Winner's share: £150,000
- Final year: 2019
- Final champion: Shaun Murphy (ENG)

The China Championship was a ranking snooker tournament held from 2016 to 2019 in China.

== Winners ==
Year	Winner	Runner-up	Final score	Season
China Championship (non-ranking)
2016	John Higgins (SCO)	Stuart Bingham (ENG)	10–7	2016–17
China Championship (ranking)
2017	Luca Brecel (BEL)	Shaun Murphy (ENG)	10–5	2017–18
2018	Mark Selby (ENG)	John Higgins (SCO)	10–9	2018–19
2019	Shaun Murphy (ENG)	Mark Williams (WAL)	10–9	2019–20

== See also ==
- China Open
