= Northern Ireland Amateur Championship =

Northern Irish amateur snooker championship

Tournament information
- Country: Northern Ireland
- Established: 1927; 99 years ago
- Organisation(s): NIBSA
- Format: Amateur event
- Recent edition: 2026
- Current champion: (Northern Ireland) Patrick Wallace

The Northern Ireland Amateur Championship (often referred to as the Northern Ireland Championship) is an annual snooker competition. It is the most prestigious amateur event in Northern Ireland.

== History ==
The first year of the championship was 1927, when G. Barron defeated G.R. Duff. It was not held in the years 1940 and 1942–44 due to World War II and in 1972 and 1973 because of The Troubles.

Many players who have appeared in the final of the tournament have gone on to be professional, most notably including two-time World Snooker Champion Alex Higgins, former world number one Mark Allen, 25-time Irish Professional Champion Jackie Rea, World Championship semi-finalist Joe Swail, World Championship quarter-finalist Patrick Wallace (who has won the competition a record ten times) and ranking event winner Jordan Brown.

Other players who have gone on to be professional include Tommy Murphy, Jack McLaughlin, Martin O’Neill, Michael Duffy, Declan Hughes, Julian Logue, Joe Meara, Sean O'Neill, Dermot McGlinchey and Robbie McGuigan. Currently Allen and Brown are playing on the World Snooker Tour.

The current champion is Patrick Wallace, who defeated Joel Connolly 10–6 in the 2026 final to win the national title for the tenth time in his career.

== Winners ==
Year	Winner	Runner-up	Final score
1927	(Northern Ireland) Gibson Barron	(Northern Ireland) Robert Duff	381–331 (Note: Aggregate score over 7 frames.)
1928	(Northern Ireland) J. Perry	(Northern Ireland) J. Blackburn	414–327
1929	(Northern Ireland) W. Little	(Northern Ireland) Capt. John Ross	282–276 (Note: Aggregate score over 5 frames.)
1930	(Northern Ireland) J. Luney	(Northern Ireland) Gibson Barron	351–285
1931	(Northern Ireland) Jack McNally	(Northern Ireland) W.R. Mills	288–273
1932	(Northern Ireland) Capt. John Ross	(Northern Ireland) W.R. Mills	266–207
1933	(Northern Ireland) J. French	(Northern Ireland) J. Chambers	281–218
1934	(Northern Ireland) Capt. John Ross	(Northern Ireland) W. Price	329–199
1935	(Northern Ireland) Billy Agnew	(Northern Ireland) Capt. John Ross	281–227
1936	(Northern Ireland) W. Lowe	(Northern Ireland) Sam Brooks	326–228
1937	(Northern Ireland) J. Chambers	(Northern Ireland) J. Blackburn	4–0
1938	(Northern Ireland) Jack McNally	(Northern Ireland) Billy Sanlon	4–3
1939	(Northern Ireland) Jack McNally	(Northern Ireland) Sam Brooks	4–3
1940	No competition due to World War II		
1941	(Northern Ireland) Jack McNally	(Northern Ireland) A. Heron	4–2
1942–1944	No competition due to World War II		
1945	(Northern Ireland) Jack McNally	(Northern Ireland) Charles Downey	4–0
1946	(Northern Ireland) Jack McNally	(Northern Ireland) Jackie Rea	4–3
1947	(Northern Ireland) Jackie Rea	(Northern Ireland) Jack Bates	4–2
1948	(Northern Ireland) Jack Bates	(Northern Ireland) Ted Haslam	4–1
1949	(Northern Ireland) Jack Bates	(Northern Ireland) Jim Stevenson	4–2
1950	(Northern Ireland) Jack Bates	(Northern Ireland) John Dickinson	4–2
1951	(Northern Ireland) Jim Stevenson	(Northern Ireland) Ted Haslam	4–1
1952	(Northern Ireland) Jim Stevenson	(Northern Ireland) Dan Turley	4–1
1953	(Northern Ireland) Jim Stevenson	(Northern Ireland) Joe Thompson	4–1
1954	(Northern Ireland) Billy Seeds	(Northern Ireland) Jim Stevenson	4–2
1955	(Northern Ireland) Jim Stevenson	(Northern Ireland) Maurice Gill	4–1
1956	(Northern Ireland) Sam Brooks	(Northern Ireland) George Lyttle	4–3
1957	(Northern Ireland) Maurice Gill	(Northern Ireland) Dessie Anderson	4–1
1958	(Northern Ireland) Billy Agnew	(Northern Ireland) Billy Hanna	4–3
1959	(Northern Ireland) Billy Hanna	(Northern Ireland) Billy Seeds	4–3
1960	(Northern Ireland) Maurice Gill	(Northern Ireland) Dessie Anderson	4–3
1961	(Northern Ireland) Dessie Anderson	(Northern Ireland) Maurice Gill	4–1
1962	(Northern Ireland) Sean McMahon	(Northern Ireland) Dessie Anderson	4–2
1963	(Northern Ireland) Dessie Anderson	(Northern Ireland) Jimmy Clint	4–2
1964	(Northern Ireland) Paddy Morgan	(Northern Ireland) Maurice Gill	4–2
1965	(Northern Ireland) Maurice Gill	(Northern Ireland) Sammy Crothers	4–1
1966	(Northern Ireland) Sammy Crothers	(Northern Ireland) Billy Caughey	4–3
1967	(Northern Ireland) Dessie Anderson	(Northern Ireland) Sammy Crothers	4–1
1968	(Northern Ireland) Alex Higgins	(Northern Ireland) Maurice Gill	4–1
1969	(Northern Ireland) Dessie Anderson	(Northern Ireland) Alex Higgins	4–0
1970	(Northern Ireland) Jimmy Clint	(Northern Ireland) Noel McCann	4–3
1971	(Northern Ireland) Sammy Crothers	(Northern Ireland) Dessie Anderson	4–2
1972	No competition due to the Northern Ireland conflict		
1973	No competition due to the Northern Ireland conflict		
1974	(Northern Ireland) Paddy Donnelly	(Northern Ireland) Sammy Pavis	4–1
1975	(Northern Ireland) Jimmy Clint	(Northern Ireland) Sean McMahon	4–1
1976	(Northern Ireland) Eddie Swaffield	(Northern Ireland) Donal McVeigh	4–1
1977	(Northern Ireland) Donal McVeigh	(Northern Ireland) George Maxwell	4–0
1978	(Northern Ireland) Donal McVeigh	(Northern Ireland) Liam McCann	4–2
1979	(Northern Ireland) Raymond Burke	(Northern Ireland) Jim Begley	4–3
1980	(Northern Ireland) Sammy Clarke	(Northern Ireland) Donal McVeigh	4–3
1981	(Northern Ireland) Tommy Murphy	(Northern Ireland) Billy Mills	4–3
1982	(Northern Ireland) Sammy Pavis	(Northern Ireland) Kieran Erwin	9–8
1983	(Northern Ireland) Jack McLaughlin	(Northern Ireland) John McIntyre	10–4
1984	(Northern Ireland) Jack McLaughlin	(Northern Ireland) Harry Morgan	10–3
1985	(Northern Ireland) Sammy Pavis	(Northern Ireland) Kieran Erwin	10–9
1986	(Northern Ireland) Colin Sewell	(Northern Ireland) Gordon Campbell	10–4
1987	(Northern Ireland) Seamus McClarey	(Northern Ireland) Gordon Campbell	10–4
1988	(Northern Ireland) Paul Doran	(Northern Ireland) Joe Swail	10–7
1989	(Northern Ireland) Harry Morgan	(Northern Ireland) Martin O'Neill	10–5
1990	(Northern Ireland) Kieran McAlinden	(Northern Ireland) Martin O'Neill	10–9
1991	(Northern Ireland) Michael Duffy	(Northern Ireland) Joe Swail	10–9
1992	(Northern Ireland) Declan Hughes	(Northern Ireland) Andy Sharpe	10–8
1993	(Northern Ireland) Patrick Wallace	(Northern Ireland) Kieran Erwin	10–8
1994	(Northern Ireland) Kieran McAlinden	(Northern Ireland) Michael Duffy	10–6
1995	(Northern Ireland) Julian Logue	(Northern Ireland) Colin Bingham	10–4
1996	(Northern Ireland) Joe Meara	(Northern Ireland) Paul King	10–6
1997	(Northern Ireland) Jonathan Nelson	(Northern Ireland) Paddy Doherty	10–5
1998	(Northern Ireland) Martin O'Neill	(Northern Ireland) Jonathan Nelson	10–8
1999	(Northern Ireland) Michael Duffy	(Northern Ireland) Kieran McMahon	10–2
2000	(Northern Ireland) Patrick Wallace	(Northern Ireland) Barry McNamee	10–2
2001	(Northern Ireland) Sean O'Neill	(Northern Ireland) Julian Logue	10–5
2002	(Northern Ireland) Joe Meara	(Northern Ireland) Jonathan Nelson	10–7
2003	(Northern Ireland) Mark Allen	(Northern Ireland) Colin Bingham	10–4
2004	(Northern Ireland) Colin Bingham	(Northern Ireland) Joe Meara	10–9
2005	(Northern Ireland) Mark Allen	(Northern Ireland) Kieran McMahon	10–1
2006	(Northern Ireland) Dermot McGlinchey	(Northern Ireland) Kieran McMahon	10–9
2007	(Northern Ireland) Patrick Wallace	(Northern Ireland) Joe Meara	10–5
2008	(Northern Ireland) Jordan Brown	(Northern Ireland) Julian Logue	10–9
2009	(Northern Ireland) Jordan Brown	(Northern Ireland) Dermot McGlinchey	10–4
2010	(Northern Ireland) Dermot McGlinchey	(Northern Ireland) Kieran McMahon	10–8
2011	(Northern Ireland) Kieran McMahon	(Northern Ireland) Brian Milne	10–5
2012	(Northern Ireland) Patrick Wallace	(Northern Ireland) Dermot McGlinchey	10–4
2013	(Northern Ireland) Patrick Wallace	(Northern Ireland) Jordan Brown	10–4
2014	(Northern Ireland) Patrick Wallace	(Northern Ireland) Raymond McAllister	10–4
2015	(Northern Ireland) Patrick Wallace	(Northern Ireland) Jordan Brown	10–2
2016	(Northern Ireland) Patrick Wallace	(Northern Ireland) Jordan Brown	10–8
2017	(Northern Ireland) Jordan Brown	(Northern Ireland) Dermot McGlinchey	10–8
2018	(Northern Ireland) Jordan Brown	(Northern Ireland) Patrick Wallace	10–5
2019	(Northern Ireland) Declan Lavery	(Northern Ireland) Darren Dornan	10–5
2020	(Northern Ireland) Declan Lavery	(Northern Ireland) Robbie McGuigan	10–9
2021	(Northern Ireland) Robbie McGuigan	(Northern Ireland) Rab McCullagh	10–4
2022	(Northern Ireland) Robbie McGuigan	(Northern Ireland) Rab McCullagh	10–6
2023	(Northern Ireland) Robbie McGuigan	(Northern Ireland) Raymond Fry	10–8
2024	(Northern Ireland) Darren Dornan	(Northern Ireland) Ryan McQuillan	10–5
2025	(Northern Ireland) Patrick Wallace	(Northern Ireland) Raymond Fry	10–7
2026	(Northern Ireland) Patrick Wallace	(Northern Ireland) Joel Connolly	10–6
