= 2023 Championship League =

2023 Championship League may refer to:

- 2023 Championship League (invitational), a snooker tournament held between December 2022 and March 2023
- 2023 Championship League (ranking), a snooker tournament held between June and July 2023
