= 2021 Championship League (ranking) =

Snooker tournament held July and August 2021

Tournament information
- Dates: 18 July – 13 August 2021
- Venue: Morningside Arena
- City: Leicester
- Country: England
- Organisation: Matchroom Sport
- Format: Ranking event
- Total prize fund: £328,000
- Winner's share: £33,000
- Highest break: Mark Allen (NIR) (146)

Final
- Champion: David Gilbert (ENG)
- Runner-up: Mark Allen (NIR)
- Score: 3–1

The 2021 Championship League was a professional ranking snooker tournament that took place from 18 July to 13 August 2021 at the Morningside Arena in Leicester, England. The event featured 128 players and was played as three rounds of round-robin groups of four, before a best-of-five final. It was the 17th edition of the Championship League and the first ranking tournament of the 2021–22 snooker season. It was one of two Championship League events held over the season, with a following invitational event held as the 2022 Championship League (invitational).

Kyren Wilson was the defending champion, having defeated Judd Trump 3–1 in the final of the September to October 2020 edition of the tournament. Wilson's title defence ended in Stage Three, where he finished third in his group. David Gilbert won the tournament, defeating Mark Allen 3–1 to win his first ranking title. Allen made the highest break of the event, a 146.

== Format ==
The 2021 Championship League was hosted from 18 July to 13 August 2021 at the Morningside Arena in Leicester, England. 128 players took part in the event. The competition began with 32 rounds of group matches with each group consisting of four players. Two groups were played to a finish every day during three blocks, from 18 to 23 July, from 26 to 30 July and from 2 to 6 August, using a two-table setup in the arena. The groups were contested using a round-robin format, with six matches played in each group. All matches in group play were played as best-of-four frames, with three points awarded for a win and one point for a draw. Group positions were determined by points scored, frame difference and then head-to-head results between players who were tied. Places that were still tied were then determined by the highest break made in the group.

The 32 players that topped the group tables qualified for the group winners' stage, consisting of eight groups of four players. The eight winners from the group winners' stage qualified for the two final groups, with the final taking place later on the same day. The winner took the Championship League title and a place at the 2021 Champion of Champions.

=== Prize fund ===
The breakdown of prize money for the tournament is shown below.

Stage One

- Winner: £3,000
- Runner-up: £2,000
- Third place: £1,000
- Fourth place: £0

Stage Two

- Winner: £4,000
- Runner-up: £3,000
- Third place: £2,000
- Fourth place: £1,000

Stage Three

- Winner: £6,000
- Runner-up: £4,000
- Third place: £2,000
- Fourth place: £1,000

Final

- Winner: £20,000
- Runner-up: £10,000

- Tournament total: £328,000

== Summary ==
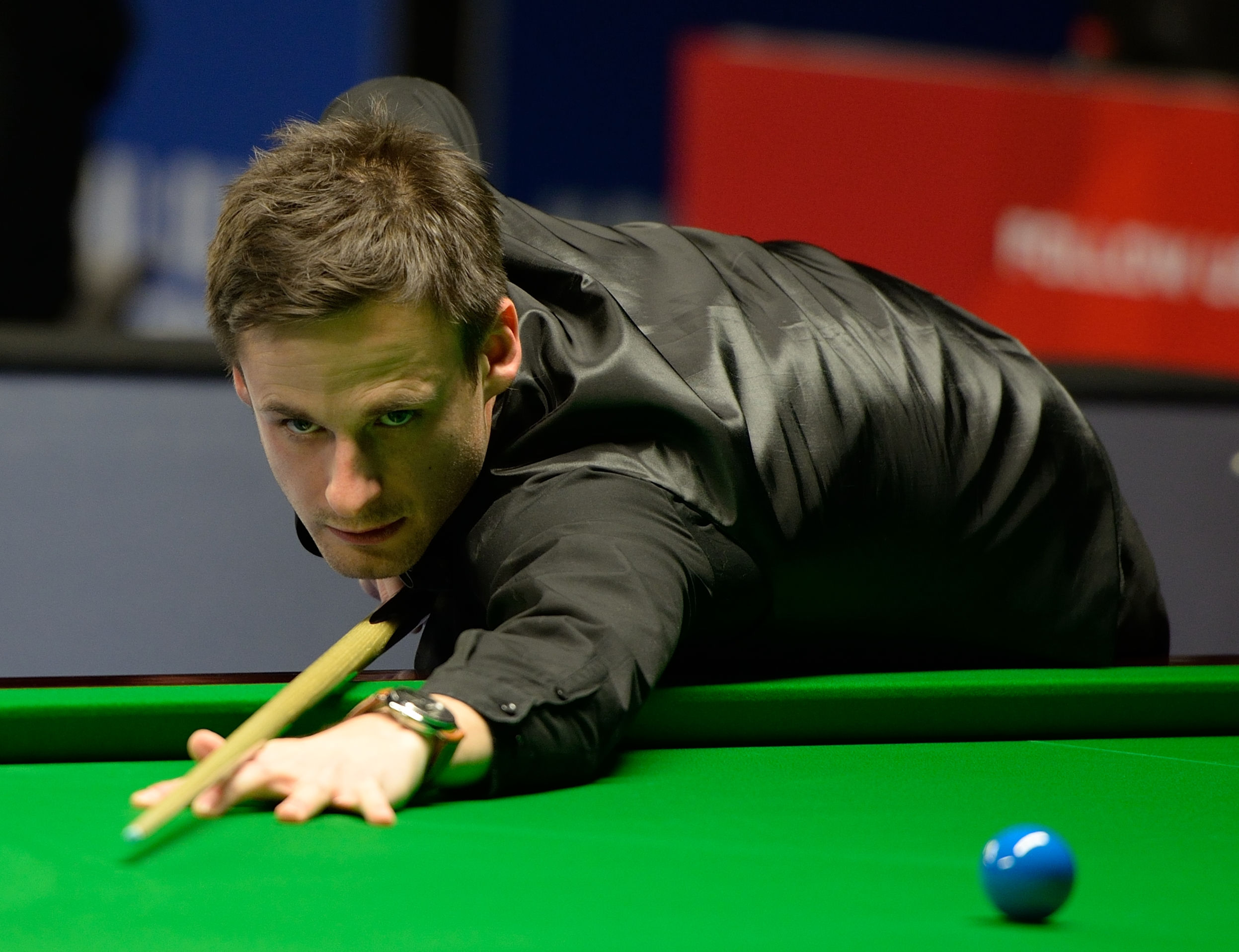
David Gilbert won his first ranking event.

The first stage was held over 32 groups with 128 participants between 18 July and 6 August. Peter Lines won Group 8 over Mark Williams after winning their match 3–0, despite losing to Jak Jones. Noppon Saengkham won all three of his matches, including over four-time world champion John Higgins to win Group 9. This was Saengkham's first professional match since being forced to withdraw from the 2021 World Snooker Championship due to a positive case of COVID-19. World number 115, Ashley Hugill won Group 24, with wins over John Astley and Stephen Maguire. Former UK Championship winner Maguire finished bottom of the group. Defending champion Wilson lost just two frames as he won Group 16.

The second stage was held over 8 groups with 32 participants between 9 and 12 August. Tom Ford won Group A, after he completed a whitewash over world number one Judd Trump. Ali Carter won Group E over two former world snooker champions Shaun Murphy and Graeme Dott, winning all three of his Group matches 3–1. Ronnie O'Sullivan, who had won Group 32, withdrew from the event, and was replaced by second placed Mark Joyce. Joyce, however, finished bottom of Group H, won by David Gilbert.

The final two groups and the final were played on 13 August. Allen won the first of the stage three groups, completing 3–0 victories over Ford and Wilson, as well as a 3–1 win over Bai Langning. During his win over Wilson, Allen made three century breaks of 127, 124 and 146 (the highest of the tournament), where Wilson scored just two points. Despite a loss in the opening match to Cao Yupeng, Gilbert won the second Group after victories over Carter and Ryan Day. The final had Allen win the opening frame with a break of 102, before Gilbert won the remaining three frames with breaks of 59 and 57. This was the first ranking event win of Gilberts 22-year career, having appeared in four previous finals. Gilbert commented after the match that he was "only used to loser's speeches".

== Stage One ==
Stage One consisted of 32 groups, each containing four players.

=== Order of play ===
Date	Group
18 July	Group 7
18 July	Group 8
19 July	Group 19
19 July	Group 23
20 July	Group 6
20 July	Group 32
21 July	Group 2
21 July	Group 28

Date	Group
22 July	Group 3
22 July	Group 10
23 July	Group 12
23 July	Group 31
26 July	Group 13
26 July	Group 14
27 July	Group 9
27 July	Group 26

Date	Group
28 July	Group 18
28 July	Group 29
29 July	Group 16
29 July	Group 20
30 July	Group 21
30 July	Group 22
2 August	Group 4
2 August	Group 24

Date	Group
3 August	Group 25
3 August	Group 27
4 August	Group 15
4 August	Group 17
5 August	Group 11
5 August	Group 30
6 August	Group 1
6 August	Group 5

=== Group 1 ===
Group 1 was played on 6 August.

==== Matches ====
- Judd Trump 3–1 Rod Lawler
- Anthony Hamilton 3–1 Lee Walker
- Anthony Hamilton 2–2 Rod Lawler
- Judd Trump 3–1 Lee Walker
- Lee Walker 3–1 Rod Lawler
- Judd Trump 3–1 Anthony Hamilton

==== Table ====
Pos.	Player	P	W	D	L	FW	FL	FD	HB	Pts
1	Judd Trump (ENG)	3	3	0	0	9	3	+6	92	9
2	Anthony Hamilton (ENG)	3	1	1	1	6	6	0	119	4
3	Lee Walker (WAL)	3	1	0	2	5	7	−2	74	3
4	Rod Lawler (ENG)	3	0	1	2	4	8	−4	88	1

=== Group 2 ===
Group 2 was played on 21 July.

==== Matches ====
- Stuart Carrington 3–0 Duane Jones
- Jordan Brown 3–0 Michael Judge
- Jordan Brown 2–2 Duane Jones
- Stuart Carrington 3–1 Michael Judge
- Jordan Brown 2–2 Stuart Carrington
- Duane Jones 2–2 Michael Judge

==== Table ====
Pos.	Player	P	W	D	L	FW	FL	FD	HB	Pts
1	Stuart Carrington (ENG)	3	2	1	0	8	3	+5	137	7
2	Jordan Brown (NIR)	3	1	2	0	7	4	+3	78	5
3	Duane Jones (WAL)	3	0	2	1	4	7	−3	91	2
4	Michael Judge (IRL)	3	0	1	2	3	8	−5	65	1

=== Group 3 ===
Group 3 was played on 22 July.

==== Matches ====
- Tom Ford 2–2 Simon Blackwell
- Simon Lichtenberg 2–2 Reanne Evans
- Simon Lichtenberg 3–0 Simon Blackwell
- Tom Ford 2–2 Reanne Evans
- Reanne Evans 1–3 Simon Blackwell
- Tom Ford 3–1 Simon Lichtenberg

==== Table ====
Pos.	Player	P	W	D	L	FW	FL	FD	HB	Pts
1	Tom Ford (ENG)	3	1	2	0	7	5	+2	77	5
2	Simon Lichtenberg (GER)	3	1	1	1	6	5	+1	81	4
3	Simon Blackwell (ENG)	3	1	1	1	5	6	−1	57	4
4	Reanne Evans (ENG)	3	0	2	1	5	7	−2	60	2

=== Group 4 ===
Group 4 was played on 2 August.

==== Matches ====
- Joe Perry 3–0 Jimmy White
- Jimmy Robertson 3–0 Sean Maddocks
- Jimmy Robertson 2–2 Jimmy White
- Joe Perry 3–0 Sean Maddocks
- Sean Maddocks 0–3 Jimmy White
- Joe Perry 1–3 Jimmy Robertson

==== Table ====
Pos.	Player	P	W	D	L	FW	FL	FD	HB	Pts
1	Jimmy Robertson (ENG)	3	2	1	0	8	3	+5	140	7
2	Joe Perry (ENG)	3	2	0	1	7	3	+4	92	6
3	Jimmy White (ENG)	3	1	1	1	5	5	0	80	4
4	Sean Maddocks (ENG)	3	0	0	3	0	9	−9	28	0

=== Group 5 ===
Group 5 was played on 6 August.

==== Matches ====
- Chris Wakelin 0–3 Mitchell Mann
- Mark Allen 3–0 Daniel Womersley
- Mark Allen 2–2 Mitchell Mann
- Chris Wakelin 2–2 Daniel Womersley
- Mark Allen 3–0 Chris Wakelin
- Mitchell Mann 2–2 Daniel Womersley

==== Table ====
Pos.	Player	P	W	D	L	FW	FL	FD	HB	Pts
1	Mark Allen (NIR)	3	2	1	0	8	2	+6	137	7
2	Mitchell Mann (ENG)	3	1	2	0	7	4	+3	132	5
3	Daniel Womersley (ENG)	3	0	2	1	4	7	−3		2
4	Chris Wakelin (ENG)	3	0	1	2	2	8	−6	60	1

=== Group 6 ===
Group 6 was played on 20 July.

==== Matches ====
- Andrew Higginson 2–2 Fergal O'Brien
- Michael Holt 2–2 Mark Lloyd
- Michael Holt 2–2 Fergal O'Brien
- Andrew Higginson 3–0 Mark Lloyd
- Michael Holt 3–0 Andrew Higginson
- Fergal O'Brien 3–0 Mark Lloyd

==== Table ====
Pos.	Player	P	W	D	L	FW	FL	FD	HB	Pts
1	Fergal O'Brien (IRL)	3	1	2	0	7	4	+3	100	5
2	Michael Holt (ENG)	3	1	2	0	7	4	+3	67	5
3	Andrew Higginson (ENG)	3	1	1	1	5	5	0	74	4
4	Mark Lloyd (ENG)	3	0	1	2	2	8	−6		1

=== Group 7 ===
Group 7 was played on 18 July.

==== Matches ====
- Nigel Bond 2–2 Allan Taylor
- Ricky Walden 3–1 Oliver Brown
- Ricky Walden 3–0 Allan Taylor
- Nigel Bond 2–2 Oliver Brown
- Ricky Walden 3–0 Nigel Bond
- Allan Taylor 3–1 Oliver Brown

==== Table ====
Pos.	Player	P	W	D	L	FW	FL	FD	HB	Pts
1	Ricky Walden (ENG)	3	3	0	0	9	1	+8	112	9
2	Allan Taylor (ENG)	3	1	1	1	5	6	−1	47	4
3	Nigel Bond (ENG)	3	0	2	1	4	7	−3	46	2
4	Oliver Brown (ENG)	3	0	1	2	4	8	−4		1

=== Group 8 ===
Group 8 was played on 18 July.

==== Matches ====
- Mark Williams 3–0 Hammad Miah
- Jak Jones 3–1 Peter Lines
- Jak Jones 2–2 Hammad Miah
- Mark Williams 0–3 Peter Lines
- Peter Lines 3–1 Hammad Miah
- Mark Williams 3–1 Jak Jones

==== Table ====
Pos.	Player	P	W	D	L	FW	FL	FD	HB	Pts
1	Peter Lines (ENG)	3	2	0	1	7	4	+3	100	6
2	Mark Williams (WAL)	3	2	0	1	6	4	+2	74	6
3	Jak Jones (WAL)	3	1	1	1	6	6	0	76	4
4	Hammad Miah (ENG)	3	0	1	2	3	8	−5	66	1

=== Group 9 ===
Group 9 was played on 27 July.

==== Matches ====
- John Higgins 3–0 Soheil Vahedi
- Noppon Saengkham 3–1 Igor Figueiredo
- Noppon Saengkham 3–1 Soheil Vahedi
- John Higgins 3–0 Igor Figueiredo
- Igor Figueiredo 2–2 Soheil Vahedi
- John Higgins 1–3 Noppon Saengkham

==== Table ====
Pos.	Player	P	W	D	L	FW	FL	FD	HB	Pts
1	Noppon Saengkham (THA)	3	3	0	0	9	3	+6	114	9
2	John Higgins (SCO)	3	2	0	1	7	3	+4	130	6
3	Soheil Vahedi (IRN)	3	0	1	2	3	8	−5	119	1
4	Igor Figueiredo (BRA)	3	0	1	2	3	8	−5	80	1

=== Group 10 ===
Group 10 was played on 22 July.

==== Matches ====
- David Grace 3–0 Farakh Ajaib
- Ben Fortey 0–3 Bai Langning
- Ben Fortey 2–2 Farakh Ajaib
- David Grace 0–3 Bai Langning
- Ben Fortey 1–3 David Grace
- Farakh Ajaib 2–2 Bai Langning

==== Table ====
Pos.	Player	P	W	D	L	FW	FL	FD	HB	Pts
1	Bai Langning (CHN)	3	2	1	0	8	2	+6	80	7
2	David Grace (ENG)	3	2	0	1	6	4	+2	96	6
3	Farakh Ajaib (PAK)	3	0	2	1	4	7	−3	40	2
4	Ben Fortey (WAL)	3	0	1	2	3	8	−5		1

Lu Ning was originally due to take part in this group, but withdrew and was replaced by Ben Fortey.

=== Group 11 ===
Group 11 was played on 5 August.

==== Matches ====
- Joe O'Connor 2–2 Andy Hicks
- Zhao Xintong 2–2 David Lilley
- Zhao Xintong 3–1 Andy Hicks
- Joe O'Connor 0–3 David Lilley
- Zhao Xintong 1–3 Joe O'Connor
- Andy Hicks 1–3 David Lilley

==== Table ====
Pos.	Player	P	W	D	L	FW	FL	FD	HB	Pts
1	David Lilley (ENG)	3	2	1	0	8	3	+5	78	7
2	Zhao Xintong (CHN)	3	1	1	1	6	6	0	98	4
3	Joe O'Connor (ENG)	3	1	1	1	5	6	−1	116	4
4	Andy Hicks (ENG)	3	0	1	2	4	8	−4	127	1

=== Group 12 ===
Group 12 was played on 23 July.

==== Matches ====
- Anthony McGill 1–3 Billy Castle
- Mark Davis 2–2 Yuan Sijun
- Mark Davis 3–0 Billy Castle
- Anthony McGill 0–3 Yuan Sijun
- Yuan Sijun 3–1 Billy Castle
- Anthony McGill 0–3 Mark Davis

==== Table ====
Pos.	Player	P	W	D	L	FW	FL	FD	HB	Pts
1	Mark Davis (ENG)	3	2	1	0	8	2	+6	66	7
2	Yuan Sijun (CHN)	3	2	1	0	8	3	+5	111	7
3	Billy Castle (ENG)	3	1	0	2	4	7	−3	51	3
4	Anthony McGill (SCO)	3	0	0	3	1	9	−8	66	0

=== Group 13 ===
Group 13 was played on 26 July.

==== Matches ====
- Oliver Lines 2–2 Peter Devlin
- Joshua Thomond 3–0 Luke Pinches
- Joshua Thomond 0–3 Peter Devlin
- Oliver Lines 3–0 Luke Pinches
- Joshua Thomond 0–3 Oliver Lines
- Peter Devlin 3–0 Luke Pinches

==== Table ====
Pos.	Player	P	W	D	L	FW	FL	FD	HB	Pts
1	Oliver Lines (ENG)	3	2	1	0	8	2	+6	93	7
2	Peter Devlin (ENG)	3	2	1	0	8	2	+6	76	7
3	Joshua Thomond (ENG)	3	1	0	2	3	6	−3	85	3
4	Luke Pinches (ENG)	3	0	0	3	0	9	−9		0

Zhou Yuelong was originally due to take part in this group, but withdrew and was replaced by Joshua Thomond.

=== Group 14 ===
Group 14 was played on 26 July.

==== Matches ====
- Martin Gould 2–2 Ryan Davies
- Ken Doherty 3–1 Rory McLeod
- Ken Doherty 3–0 Ryan Davies
- Martin Gould 2–2 Rory McLeod
- Rory McLeod 3–1 Ryan Davies
- Martin Gould 2–2 Ken Doherty

==== Table ====
Pos.	Player	P	W	D	L	FW	FL	FD	HB	Pts
1	Ken Doherty (IRL)	3	2	1	0	8	3	+5	89	7
2	Rory McLeod (JAM)	3	1	1	1	6	6	0	81	4
3	Martin Gould (ENG)	3	0	3	0	6	6	0	52	3
4	Ryan Davies (ENG)	3	0	1	2	3	8	−5		1

=== Group 15 ===
Group 15 was played on 4 August.

==== Matches ====
- Mark King 3–1 Andrew Pagett
- Matthew Stevens 3–1 Ross Muir
- Matthew Stevens 1–3 Andrew Pagett
- Mark King 2–2 Ross Muir
- Matthew Stevens 3–1 Mark King
- Andrew Pagett 1–3 Ross Muir

==== Table ====
Pos.	Player	P	W	D	L	FW	FL	FD	HB	Pts
1	Matthew Stevens (WAL)	3	2	0	1	7	5	+2	130	6
2	Mark King (ENG)	3	1	1	1	6	6	0	64	4
3	Ross Muir (SCO)	3	1	1	1	6	6	0	58	4
4	Andrew Pagett (WAL)	3	1	0	2	5	7	−2	53	3

=== Group 16 ===
Group 16 was played on 29 July.

==== Matches ====
- Kyren Wilson 3–1 Dylan Emery
- Sam Craigie 3–0 Ben Hancorn
- Sam Craigie 3–0 Dylan Emery
- Kyren Wilson 3–1 Ben Hancorn
- Ben Hancorn 2–2 Dylan Emery
- Kyren Wilson 3–0 Sam Craigie

==== Table ====
Pos.	Player	P	W	D	L	FW	FL	FD	HB	Pts
1	Kyren Wilson (ENG)	3	3	0	0	9	2	+7	68	9
2	Sam Craigie (ENG)	3	2	0	1	6	3	+3	90	6
3	Dylan Emery (WAL)	3	0	1	2	3	8	−5	66	1
4	Ben Hancorn (ENG)	3	0	1	2	3	8	−5	64	1

=== Group 17 ===
Group 17 was played on 4 August.

==== Matches ====
- Shaun Murphy 3–0 Michael Collumb
- Jamie Jones 3–1 Chen Zifan
- Jamie Jones 2–2 Michael Collumb
- Shaun Murphy 3–1 Chen Zifan
- Chen Zifan 2–2 Michael Collumb
- Shaun Murphy 2–2 Jamie Jones

==== Table ====
Pos.	Player	P	W	D	L	FW	FL	FD	HB	Pts
1	Shaun Murphy (ENG)	3	2	1	0	8	3	+5	100	7
2	Jamie Jones (WAL)	3	1	2	0	7	5	+2	102	5
3	Michael Collumb (SCO)	3	0	2	1	4	7	−3	73	2
4	Chen Zifan (CHN)	3	0	1	2	4	8	−4	97	1

=== Group 18 ===
Group 18 was played on 28 July.

==== Matches ====
- Zhao Jianbo 2–2 Gerard Greene
- Robert Milkins 1–3 Haydon Pinhey
- Robert Milkins 0–3 Gerard Greene
- Zhao Jianbo 3–0 Haydon Pinhey
- Robert Milkins 2–2 Zhao Jianbo
- Gerard Greene 3–1 Haydon Pinhey

==== Table ====
Pos.	Player	P	W	D	L	FW	FL	FD	HB	Pts
1	Gerard Greene (NIR)	3	2	1	0	8	3	+5	61	7
2	Zhao Jianbo (CHN)	3	1	2	0	7	4	+3	93	5
3	Haydon Pinhey (ENG)	3	1	0	2	4	7	−3	75	3
4	Robert Milkins (ENG)	3	0	1	2	3	8	−5	111	1

=== Group 19 ===
Group 19 was played on 19 July.

==== Matches ====
- Ali Carter 3–1 Michael Georgiou
- Dominic Dale 2–2 Sydney Wilson
- Dominic Dale 2–2 Michael Georgiou
- Ali Carter 3–0 Sydney Wilson
- Sydney Wilson 1–3 Michael Georgiou
- Ali Carter 2–2 Dominic Dale

==== Table ====
Pos.	Player	P	W	D	L	FW	FL	FD	HB	Pts
1	Ali Carter (ENG)	3	2	1	0	8	3	+5	79	7
2	Michael Georgiou (CYP)	3	1	1	1	6	6	0	94	4
3	Dominic Dale (WAL)	3	0	3	0	6	6	0	54	3
4	Sydney Wilson (ENG)	3	0	1	2	3	8	−5	102	1

Alfie Burden was originally due to take part in this group, but withdrew and was replaced by Sydney Wilson.

=== Group 20 ===
Group 20 was played on 29 July.

==== Matches ====
- Robbie Williams 3–0 Iulian Boiko
- Graeme Dott 3–1 Si Jiahui
- Graeme Dott 3–1 Iulian Boiko
- Robbie Williams 0–3 Si Jiahui
- Graeme Dott 2–2 Robbie Williams
- Iulian Boiko 2–2 Si Jiahui

==== Table ====
Pos.	Player	P	W	D	L	FW	FL	FD	HB	Pts
1	Graeme Dott (SCO)	3	2	1	0	8	4	+4	88	7
2	Si Jiahui (CHN)	3	1	1	1	6	5	+1	58	4
3	Robbie Williams (ENG)	3	1	1	1	5	5	0	49	4
4	Iulian Boiko (UKR)	3	0	1	2	3	8	−5	65	1

=== Group 21 ===
Group 21 was played on 30 July.

==== Matches ====
- Stuart Bingham 2–2 Michael White
- Elliot Slessor 0–3 Gao Yang
- Elliot Slessor 1–3 Michael White
- Stuart Bingham 3–0 Gao Yang
- Gao Yang 1–3 Michael White
- Stuart Bingham 3–1 Elliot Slessor

==== Table ====
Pos.	Player	P	W	D	L	FW	FL	FD	HB	Pts
1	Stuart Bingham (ENG)	3	2	1	0	8	3	+5	134	7
2	Michael White (WAL)	3	2	1	0	8	4	+4	112	7
3	Gao Yang (CHN)	3	1	0	2	4	6	−2	65	3
4	Elliot Slessor (ENG)	3	0	0	3	2	9	−7	50	0

=== Group 22 ===
Group 22 was played on 30 July.

==== Matches ====
- Hossein Vafaei 1–3 Jackson Page
- Ryan Day 3–1 Barry Pinches
- Ryan Day 3–0 Jackson Page
- Hossein Vafaei 2–2 Barry Pinches
- Ryan Day 2–2 Hossein Vafaei
- Jackson Page 2–2 Barry Pinches

==== Table ====
Pos.	Player	P	W	D	L	FW	FL	FD	HB	Pts
1	Ryan Day (WAL)	3	2	1	0	8	3	+5	136	7
2	Jackson Page (WAL)	3	1	1	1	5	6	−1	95	4
3	Barry Pinches (ENG)	3	0	2	1	5	7	−2	122	2
4	Hossein Vafaei (IRN)	3	0	2	1	5	7	−2	82	2

=== Group 23 ===
Group 23 was played on 19 July.

==== Matches ====
- Alexander Ursenbacher 3–0 Aaron Hill
- Scott Donaldson 1–3 Leo Fernandez
- Scott Donaldson 1–3 Aaron Hill
- Alexander Ursenbacher 3–0 Leo Fernandez
- Scott Donaldson 0–3 Alexander Ursenbacher
- Aaron Hill 0–3 Leo Fernandez

==== Table ====
Pos.	Player	P	W	D	L	FW	FL	FD	HB	Pts
1	Alexander Ursenbacher (SUI)	3	3	0	0	9	0	+9	79	9
2	Leo Fernandez (IRL)	3	2	0	1	6	4	+2	59	6
3	Aaron Hill (IRL)	3	1	0	2	3	7	−4	54	3
4	Scott Donaldson (SCO)	3	0	0	3	2	9	−7	59	0

=== Group 24 ===
Group 24 was played on 2 August.

==== Matches ====
- Sunny Akani 2–2 Ashley Hugill
- Stephen Maguire 2–2 John Astley
- Stephen Maguire 1–3 Ashley Hugill
- Sunny Akani 2–2 John Astley
- Stephen Maguire 0–3 Sunny Akani
- Ashley Hugill 3–0 John Astley

==== Table ====
Pos.	Player	P	W	D	L	FW	FL	FD	HB	Pts
1	Ashley Hugill (ENG)	3	2	1	0	8	3	+5	87	7
2	Sunny Akani (THA)	3	1	2	0	7	4	+3	65	5
3	John Astley (ENG)	3	0	2	1	4	7	−3	56	2
4	Stephen Maguire (SCO)	3	0	1	2	3	8	−5	70	1

=== Group 25 ===
Group 25 was played on 3 August.

==== Matches ====
- Yan Bingtao 3–0 Robbie McGuigan
- Jamie Clarke 2–2 Louis Heathcote
- Jamie Clarke 3–0 Robbie McGuigan
- Yan Bingtao 3–1 Louis Heathcote
- Louis Heathcote 3–0 Robbie McGuigan
- Yan Bingtao 3–1 Jamie Clarke

==== Table ====
Pos.	Player	P	W	D	L	FW	FL	FD	HB	Pts
1	Yan Bingtao (CHN)	3	3	0	0	9	2	+8	130	9
2	Louis Heathcote (ENG)	3	1	1	1	6	5	+1	115	4
3	Jamie Clarke (WAL)	3	1	1	1	6	5	+1	79	4
4	Robbie McGuigan (NIR)	3	0	0	3	0	9	−9		0

=== Group 26 ===
Group 26 was played on 27 July.

==== Matches ====
- Steven Hallworth 0–3 Cao Yupeng
- Gary Wilson 2–2 James Cahill
- Gary Wilson 0–3 Cao Yupeng
- Steven Hallworth 3–1 James Cahill
- Gary Wilson 2–2 Steven Hallworth
- Cao Yupeng 3–1 James Cahill

==== Table ====
Pos.	Player	P	W	D	L	FW	FL	FD	HB	Pts
1	Cao Yupeng (CHN)	3	3	0	0	9	1	+8	87	9
2	Steven Hallworth (ENG)	3	1	1	1	5	6	−1	66	4
3	Gary Wilson (ENG)	3	0	2	1	4	7	−3	117	2
4	James Cahill (ENG)	3	0	1	2	4	8	−4	93	1

=== Group 27 ===
Group 27 was played on 3 August.

==== Matches ====
- Ashley Carty 3–1 Lukas Kleckers
- Matthew Selt 2–2 Fraser Patrick
- Matthew Selt 2–2 Lukas Kleckers
- Ashley Carty 2–2 Fraser Patrick
- Matthew Selt 3–1 Ashley Carty
- Lukas Kleckers 3–1 Fraser Patrick

==== Table ====
Pos.	Player	P	W	D	L	FW	FL	FD	HB	Pts
1	Matthew Selt (ENG)	3	1	2	0	7	5	+2	63	5
2	Ashley Carty (ENG)	3	1	1	1	6	6	0	53	4
3	Lukas Kleckers (GER)	3	1	1	1	6	6	0	91	4
4	Fraser Patrick (SCO)	3	0	2	1	5	7	−2	76	2

=== Group 28 ===
Group 28 was played on 21 July.

==== Matches ====
- Barry Hawkins 3–0 Kuldesh Johal
- Ben Woollaston 2–2 Zak Surety
- Ben Woollaston 3–0 Kuldesh Johal
- Barry Hawkins 3–0 Zak Surety
- Zak Surety 2–2 Kuldesh Johal
- Barry Hawkins 2–2 Ben Woollaston

==== Table ====
Pos.	Player	P	W	D	L	FW	FL	FD	HB	Pts
1	Barry Hawkins (ENG)	3	2	1	0	8	2	+6	107	7
2	Ben Woollaston (ENG)	3	1	2	0	7	4	+3	73	5
3	Zak Surety (ENG)	3	0	2	1	4	7	−3	76	2
4	Kuldesh Johal (ENG)	3	0	1	2	2	8	−6		1

=== Group 29 ===
Group 29 was played on 28 July.

==== Matches ====
- Thepchaiya Un-Nooh 3–1 Zhang Jiankang
- Martin O'Donnell 0–3 Craig Steadman
- Martin O'Donnell 1–3 Zhang Jiankang
- Thepchaiya Un-Nooh 2–2 Craig Steadman
- Craig Steadman 2–2 Zhang Jiankang
- Thepchaiya Un-Nooh 2–2 Martin O'Donnell

==== Table ====
Pos.	Player	P	W	D	L	FW	FL	FD	HB	Pts
1	Craig Steadman (ENG)	3	1	2	0	7	4	+3	85	5
2	Thepchaiya Un-Nooh (THA)	3	1	2	0	7	5	+2	111	5
3	Zhang Jiankang (CHN)	3	1	1	1	6	6	0	92	4
4	Martin O'Donnell (ENG)	3	0	1	2	3	8	−5	130	1

=== Group 30 ===
Group 30 was played on 5 August.

==== Matches ====
- David Gilbert 3–1 Sanderson Lam
- Liam Highfield 3–0 Jamie Wilson
- Liam Highfield 3–1 Sanderson Lam
- David Gilbert 3–0 Jamie Wilson
- Jamie Wilson 2–2 Sanderson Lam
- David Gilbert 3–0 Liam Highfield

==== Table ====
Pos.	Player	P	W	D	L	FW	FL	FD	HB	Pts
1	David Gilbert (ENG)	3	3	0	0	9	1	+8	67	9
2	Liam Highfield (ENG)	3	2	0	1	6	4	+2	88	6
3	Sanderson Lam (ENG)	3	0	1	2	4	8	−4	69	1
4	Jamie Wilson (ENG)	3	0	1	2	2	8	−6	63	1

=== Group 31 ===
Group 31 was played on 23 July.

==== Matches ====
- Pang Junxu 2–2 Chang Bingyu
- Luca Brecel 3–1 Dean Young
- Luca Brecel 1–3 Chang Bingyu
- Pang Junxu 2–2 Dean Young
- Luca Brecel 0–3 Pang Junxu
- Chang Bingyu 3–0 Dean Young

==== Table ====
Pos.	Player	P	W	D	L	FW	FL	FD	HB	Pts
1	Chang Bingyu (CHN)	3	2	1	0	8	3	+5	127	7
2	Pang Junxu (CHN)	3	1	2	0	7	4	+3	90	5
3	Luca Brecel (BEL)	3	1	0	2	4	7	−3	53	3
4	Dean Young (SCO)	3	0	1	2	3	8	−5	100	1

=== Group 32 ===
Group 32 was played on 20 July.

==== Matches ====
- Ronnie O'Sullivan 3–1 Ian Burns
- Mark Joyce 3–1 Saqib Nasir
- Mark Joyce 2–2 Ian Burns
- Ronnie O'Sullivan 3–0 Saqib Nasir
- Saqib Nasir 0–3 Ian Burns
- Ronnie O'Sullivan 2–2 Mark Joyce

==== Table ====
Pos.	Player	P	W	D	L	FW	FL	FD	HB	Pts
1	Ronnie O'Sullivan (ENG)	3	2	1	0	8	3	+5	88	7
2	Mark Joyce (ENG)	3	1	2	0	7	5	+2	95	5
3	Ian Burns (ENG)	3	1	1	1	6	5	+1	70	4
4	Saqib Nasir (ENG)	3	0	0	3	1	9	−8		0

Ng On-yee was originally due to take part in this group, but withdrew and was replaced by Saqib Nasir.

== Stage Two ==
Stage Two consisted of eight groups, each containing four players.

=== Order of play ===
Date	Group
9 August	Group G
9 August	Group H
10 August	Group E
10 August	Group F

Date	Group
11 August	Group C
11 August	Group D
12 August	Group A
12 August	Group B

=== Group A ===
Group A was played on 12 August.

==== Matches ====
- Judd Trump 2–2 Jimmy Robertson
- Tom Ford 0–3 Stuart Carrington
- Tom Ford 3–0 Jimmy Robertson
- Judd Trump 3–0 Stuart Carrington
- Stuart Carrington 1–3 Jimmy Robertson
- Judd Trump 0–3 Tom Ford

==== Table ====
Pos.	Player	P	W	D	L	FW	FL	FD	HB	Pts
1	Tom Ford (ENG)	3	2	0	1	6	3	+3	124	6
2	Judd Trump (ENG)	3	1	1	1	5	5	0	128	4
3	Jimmy Robertson (ENG)	3	1	1	1	5	6	−1	63	4
4	Stuart Carrington (ENG)	3	1	0	2	4	6	−2	125	3

=== Group B ===
Group B was played on 12 August.

==== Matches ====
- Ricky Walden 3–1 Peter Lines
- Mark Allen 3–0 Fergal O'Brien
- Mark Allen 3–1 Peter Lines
- Ricky Walden 3–0 Fergal O'Brien
- Mark Allen 3–0 Ricky Walden
- Peter Lines 2–2 Fergal O'Brien

==== Table ====
Pos.	Player	P	W	D	L	FW	FL	FD	HB	Pts
1	Mark Allen (NIR)	3	3	0	0	9	1	+8	115	9
2	Ricky Walden (ENG)	3	2	0	1	6	4	+2	125	6
3	Peter Lines (ENG)	3	0	1	2	4	8	−4	125	1
4	Fergal O'Brien (IRL)	3	0	1	2	2	8	−6	68	1

=== Group C ===
Group C was played on 11 August.

==== Matches ====
- Mark Davis 1–3 David Lilley
- Noppon Saengkham 2–2 Bai Langning
- Noppon Saengkham 3–1 David Lilley
- Mark Davis 0–3 Bai Langning
- Noppon Saengkham 0–3 Mark Davis
- David Lilley 2–2 Bai Langning

==== Table ====
Pos.	Player	P	W	D	L	FW	FL	FD	HB	Pts
1	Bai Langning (CHN)	3	1	2	0	7	4	+3	92	5
2	David Lilley (ENG)	3	1	1	1	6	6	0	90	4
3	Noppon Saengkham (THA)	3	1	1	1	5	6	−1		4
4	Mark Davis (ENG)	3	1	0	2	4	6	−2	113	3

=== Group D ===
Group D was played on 11 August.

==== Matches ====
- Kyren Wilson 3–1 Ken Doherty
- Matthew Stevens 2–2 Oliver Lines
- Matthew Stevens 0–3 Ken Doherty
- Kyren Wilson 3–1 Oliver Lines
- Oliver Lines 3–0 Ken Doherty
- Kyren Wilson 0–3 Matthew Stevens

==== Table ====
Pos.	Player	P	W	D	L	FW	FL	FD	HB	Pts
1	Kyren Wilson (ENG)	3	2	0	1	6	5	+1	92	6
2	Oliver Lines (ENG)	3	1	1	1	6	5	+1	80	4
3	Matthew Stevens (WAL)	3	1	1	1	5	5	0	111	4
4	Ken Doherty (IRL)	3	1	0	2	4	6	−2	95	3

=== Group E ===
Group E was played on 10 August.

==== Matches ====
- Shaun Murphy 3–1 Gerard Greene
- Graeme Dott 1–3 Ali Carter
- Graeme Dott 3–1 Gerard Greene
- Shaun Murphy 1–3 Ali Carter
- Ali Carter 3–1 Gerard Greene
- Shaun Murphy 3–0 Graeme Dott

==== Table ====
Pos.	Player	P	W	D	L	FW	FL	FD	HB	Pts
1	Ali Carter (ENG)	3	3	0	0	9	3	+6	97	9
2	Shaun Murphy (ENG)	3	2	0	1	7	4	+3	91	6
3	Graeme Dott (SCO)	3	1	0	2	4	7	−3	106	3
4	Gerard Greene (NIR)	3	0	0	3	3	9	−6		0

=== Group F ===
Group F was played on 10 August.

==== Matches ====
- Ryan Day 2–2 Alexander Ursenbacher
- Stuart Bingham 3–1 Ashley Hugill
- Stuart Bingham 3–0 Alexander Ursenbacher
- Ryan Day 3–1 Ashley Hugill
- Stuart Bingham 0–3 Ryan Day
- Alexander Ursenbacher 2–2 Ashley Hugill

==== Table ====
Pos.	Player	P	W	D	L	FW	FL	FD	HB	Pts
1	Ryan Day (WAL)	3	2	1	0	8	3	+5	74	7
2	Stuart Bingham (ENG)	3	2	0	1	6	4	+2	67	6
3	Alexander Ursenbacher (SUI)	3	0	2	1	4	7	−3	95	2
4	Ashley Hugill (ENG)	3	0	1	2	4	8	−4	74	1

=== Group G ===
Group G was played on 9 August.

==== Matches ====
- Barry Hawkins 2–2 Matthew Selt
- Yan Bingtao 2–2 Cao Yupeng
- Yan Bingtao 2–2 Matthew Selt
- Barry Hawkins 1–3 Cao Yupeng
- Yan Bingtao 3–1 Barry Hawkins
- Matthew Selt 0–3 Cao Yupeng

==== Table ====
Pos.	Player	P	W	D	L	FW	FL	FD	HB	Pts
1	Cao Yupeng (CHN)	3	2	1	0	8	3	+5	117	7
2	Yan Bingtao (CHN)	3	1	2	0	7	5	+2	129	5
3	Matthew Selt (ENG)	3	0	2	1	4	7	−3	72	2
4	Barry Hawkins (ENG)	3	0	1	2	4	8	−4	80	1

=== Group H ===
Group H was played on 9 August.

==== Matches ====
- Mark Joyce 1–3 Craig Steadman
- David Gilbert 3–0 Chang Bingyu
- David Gilbert 3–0 Craig Steadman
- Mark Joyce 2–2 Chang Bingyu
- Chang Bingyu 3–1 Craig Steadman
- Mark Joyce 0–3 David Gilbert

==== Table ====
Pos.	Player	P	W	D	L	FW	FL	FD	HB	Pts
1	David Gilbert (ENG)	3	3	0	0	9	0	+9	143	9
2	Chang Bingyu (CHN)	3	1	1	1	5	6	−1	86	4
3	Craig Steadman (ENG)	3	1	0	2	3	7	−4	133	3
4	Mark Joyce (ENG)	3	0	1	2	4	8	−4	89	1

Ronnie O'Sullivan was originally due to take part in this group, but withdrew and was replaced by Mark Joyce.

== Stage Three ==
Stage Three consisted of two groups, each containing four players.

=== Winners' group 1 ===
Winners' group 1 was played on 13 August.

==== Winners' group 1 matches ====
- Kyren Wilson 2–2 Bai Langning
- Mark Allen 3–0 Tom Ford
- Mark Allen 3–1 Bai Langning
- Kyren Wilson 2–2 Tom Ford
- Tom Ford 3–1 Bai Langning
- Kyren Wilson 0–3 Mark Allen

==== Winners' group 1 table ====
Pos.	Player	P	W	D	L	FW	FL	FD	HB	Pts
1	Mark Allen (NIR)	3	3	0	0	9	1	+8	146	9
2	Tom Ford (ENG)	3	1	1	1	5	6	−1	79	4
3	Kyren Wilson (ENG)	3	0	2	1	4	7	−3	103	2
4	Bai Langning (CHN)	3	0	1	2	4	8	−4	118	1

=== Winners' group 2 ===
Winners' group 2 was played on 13 August.

==== Winners' group 2 matches ====
- Ali Carter 2–2 Ryan Day
- David Gilbert 1–3 Cao Yupeng
- David Gilbert 3–0 Ryan Day
- Ali Carter 3–1 Cao Yupeng
- David Gilbert 3–1 Ali Carter
- Ryan Day 3–1 Cao Yupeng

==== Winners' group 2 table ====
Pos.	Player	P	W	D	L	FW	FL	FD	HB	Pts
1	David Gilbert (ENG)	3	2	0	1	7	4	+3	139	6
2	Ali Carter (ENG)	3	1	1	1	6	6	0	87	4
3	Ryan Day (WAL)	3	1	1	1	5	6	−1	91	4
4	Cao Yupeng (CHN)	3	1	0	2	5	7	−2	113	3

== Final ==
The final was played on 13 August as the best of five frames.

Final: Best of 5 frames. Referee: Paul Collier; Morningside Arena, Leicester, England, 13 August 2021.
Mark Allen; Northern Ireland	1–3	David Gilbert; England
Frame scores: 120–0 (102), 5–74, 6–78, 36–82
102	Highest break	59
1	Century breaks	0

== Century breaks ==
There was a total of 74 century breaks made during the tournament. The highest break was made by Mark Allen, who made a 146 in his stage three match against Kyren Wilson.

- 146, 137, 127, 124, 124, 123, 115, 110, 103, 102 – Mark Allen
- 143, 139, 131, 100 – David Gilbert
- 140, 100 – Jimmy Robertson
- 137, 125 – Stuart Carrington
- 136, 134 – Ryan Day
- 134, 116 – Stuart Bingham
- 133 – Craig Steadman
- 132 – Mitchell Mann
- 130, 129, 114, 104 – Yan Bingtao
- 130, 111 – Matthew Stevens
- 130 – John Higgins
- 130 – Martin O'Donnell
- 128 – Judd Trump
- 127, 125 – Chang Bingyu
- 127 – Andy Hicks
- 125, 115, 100 – Peter Lines
- 125, 112, 105, 104, 101 – Ricky Walden
- 124 – Tom Ford
- 122 – Barry Pinches
- 119 – Anthony Hamilton
- 119 – Soheil Vahedi
- 118 – Bai Langning
- 117, 113 – Cao Yupeng
- 117 – Gary Wilson
- 116 – Joe O'Connor
- 115 – Louis Heathcote
- 114, 108 – Noppon Saengkham
- 113, 102 – Mark Davis
- 112, 104 – Michael White
- 111, 103 – Yuan Sijun
- 111, 100 – Thepchaiya Un-Nooh
- 111 – Robert Milkins
- 107 – Barry Hawkins
- 106 – Graeme Dott
- 103, 100 – Kyren Wilson
- 102 – Jamie Jones
- 102 – Sydney Wilson
- 100 – Shaun Murphy
- 100 – Fergal O'Brien
- 100 – Dean Young
