= 2021 UK Championship =

Snooker tournament

2021 Cazoo UK Championship
Tournament information
- Dates: 23 November – 5 December 2021
- Venue: York Barbican
- City: York
- Country: England
- Organisation: World Snooker Tour
- Format: Ranking event
- Total prize fund: £1,009,000
- Winner's share: £200,000
- Highest break: Gary Wilson (ENG) (147)

Final
- Champion: Zhao Xintong (CHN)
- Runner-up: Luca Brecel (BEL)
- Score: 10–5

The 2021 UK Championship (officially the 2021 Cazoo UK Championship) was a professional snooker tournament that took place from 23 November to 5 December 2021 at the York Barbican, in York, England. The event was the first Triple Crown and fifth ranking event of the 2021–22 snooker season. The tournament featured a prize fund of £1,009,000, with the winner receiving £200,000. It was sponsored by car retail company Cazoo and broadcast in the UK by the BBC and Eurosport.

Neil Robertson was the defending champion, having defeated Judd Trump 10–9 in the 2020 final, but he lost 2–6 in the first round to amateur John Astley. Many other top seeds exited the tournament in the early rounds, with 11 of the world's top 13 ranked players eliminated before the last-16 stage. For the first time in the tournament's history, no top-16 player reached the final, which was contested between China's Zhao Xintong and Belgium's Luca Brecel, both of whom made their first appearances in a Triple Crown final. Zhao won the event with a 10–5 victory in the final to claim his first ranking title. The event featured 119 century breaks, with Gary Wilson making the highest, his fourth career maximum break, in his first-round match against Ian Burns.

Aged 24, Zhao became the youngest winner of the UK Championship since Trump in 2011. He became the fourth non-British winner in the tournament's history, after Ireland's Patsy Fagan, China's Ding Junhui, and Australia's Robertson. He also became the fourth player from mainland China to win a ranking title, after Ding, Liang Wenbo and Yan Bingtao. His win enabled him to enter the top 16 for the first time and secure a place in the second Triple Crown event of the season, the 2022 Masters.

This edition of the tournament was the last to be played under the flat-128 draw format. From the following edition, the tournament reverted to a tiered draw format, with the top 16 being seeded through to the venue, with all others playing a World Championship-style qualifying event prior to the main stages.

== Overview ==
The 2021 UK Championship was a professional snooker tournament that took place from 23 November to 5 December 2021 at the York Barbican, in York, England. The UK Championship was first held in 1977 as the United Kingdom Professional Snooker Championship, open to British residents only. At the 1984 event, it became a ranking tournament open to players of any nationality, which it has remained ever since. The event was the first Triple Crown tournament, and the fifth ranking event of the 2021–22 snooker season. There were 128 participants, 119 players from the World Snooker Tour, and 9 invited amateur players.

The defending champion was Neil Robertson, who defeated Judd Trump 10–9 in the previous year's final. The tournament was broadcast live in the United Kingdom by BBC Sport, and shown on Eurosport in Europe. Worldwide, the event was covered by China Central Television and Superstars Online in China, and by Sky Sport in New Zealand. It was simulcast in Hong Kong by Now TV; DAZN covered the event across Canada, Brazil and the United States. It was sponsored by vehicle rental company Cazoo.

=== Prize fund ===
The breakdown of prize money for the event is shown below:

- Winner: £200,000
- Runner-up: £80,000
- Semi-final: £40,000
- Quarter-final: £24,500
- Last 16: £17,000
- Last 32: £12,000
- Last 64: £6,500
- Highest break: £15,000
- Total: £1,009,000

== Summary ==
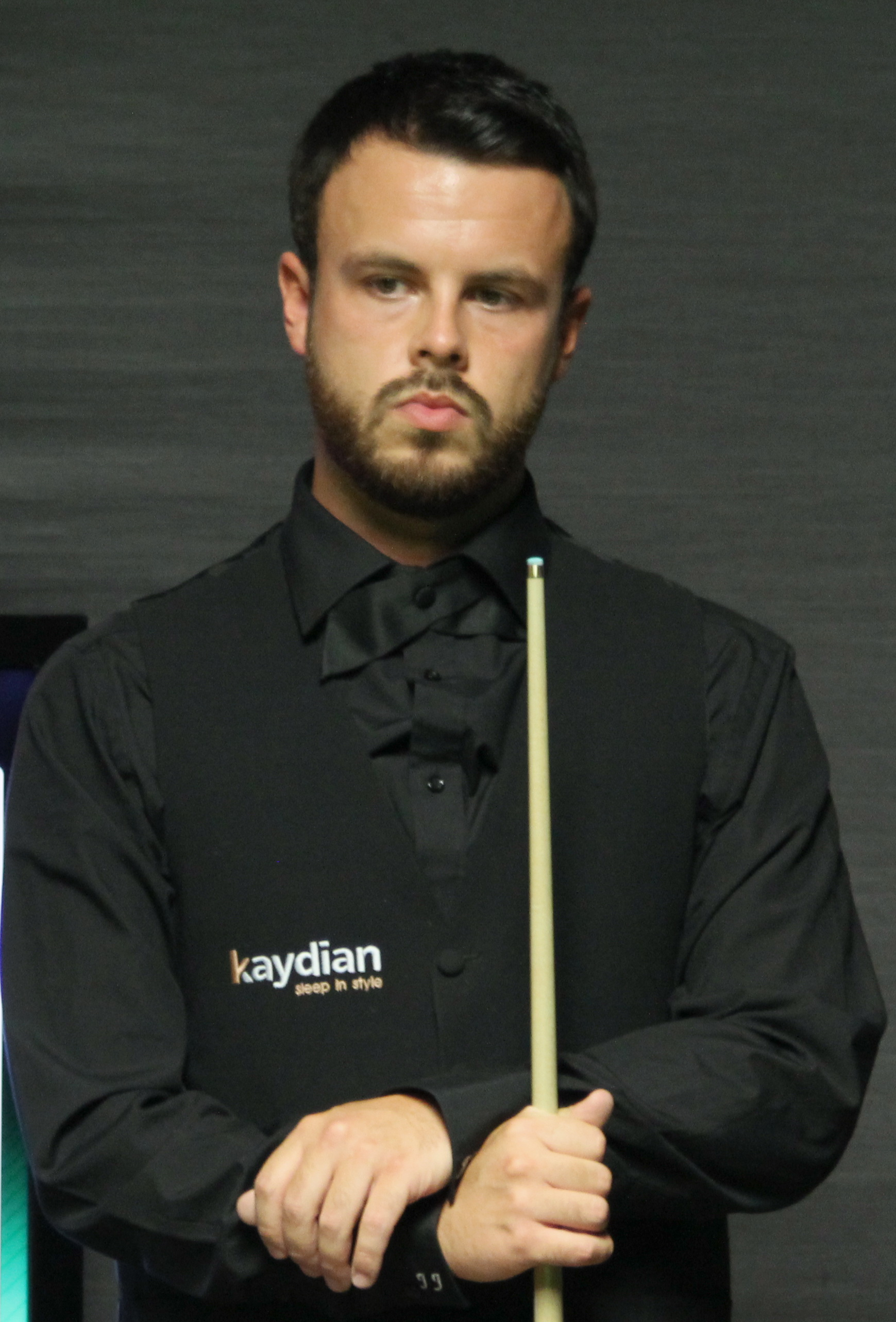
John Astley defeated the defending champion Neil Robertson 6–2 in the opening round.

All matches other than the final were held as the best-of-11 frames. In the first round, defending champion Neil Robertson lost 2–6 to amateur player John Astley, but later revealed that he had been diagnosed with pulsatile tinnitus and would have withdrawn from the tournament regardless. Shaun Murphy, the sixth seed, lost 5–6 to another amateur player Si Jiahui, and made comments afterward on BBC Radio 5 Live suggesting that amateur players should not be permitted to compete in professional events. Robertson, Mark Williams and Mark Selby agreed with Murphy's comments, although the World Snooker Tour stated that giving amateurs the opportunity to compete in professional tournaments was a vital aspect of their development, and its chairman Steve Dawson stated that the drama caused by amateur players beating elite professionals had been "great for the sport". Critics on social media noted the irony that Murphy himself had attempted to qualify for golf's 2019 Open Championship as an amateur competitor. Thepchaiya Un-Nooh compiled five century breaks while defeating Stephen Hendry 6–1 in the first round, becoming only the fourth player after Fergal O'Brien, Trump, and Matthew Selt to make that many in a best-of-11 match.

Reigning world champion Selby (seeded 2), Williams (9), Ding Junhui (10), and reigning Masters champion Yan Bingtao (12) all lost in the last 64. Selby trailed world number 63 Hossein Vafaei 0–5, but won the next two frames before Vafaei fluked a respotted black in frame eight to win the match 6–2. Williams led world number 56 Anthony Hamilton 3–0, but lost the match 5–6, after which he apologised for falling asleep during the sixth frame, stating he had been feeling unwell following a case of COVID-19. Ding lost 3–6 to world number 55 Sam Craigie, guaranteeing that he would drop out of the top 16 after the tournament and be ineligible to compete in the Masters for the first time since 2006. After Craigie potted the final pink in frame eight, referee Maike Kesseler awarded him the frame for a 5–3 lead while the cue ball was still in motion. Craigie then placed his cue on the table and the cue ball collided with it. Speaking for the BBC studio, pundit Ken Doherty argued that the referee should have called a foul, respotted the pink, and given Ding the opportunity to come back to the table and attempt to level the match at 4–4; however, the frame had been awarded to Craigie prematurely. Speaking on Eurosport, pundit Alan McManus also criticised Kesseler for awarding the frame before the cue ball had come to rest. Yan lost 3–6 to world number 53 Ben Woollaston.

Five more seeded players exited in the round of 32. Third seed Trump, the previous year's runner-up, suffered a shock 3–6 defeat to world number 35 Selt. John Higgins (7) and Mark Allen (11) fell victim to comebacks by their opponents, with Higgins losing 5–6 to Zhao Xintong after leading 5–3, and Allen losing 5–6 to David Gilbert after leading 5–2. Stephen Maguire (8) was whitewashed 0–6 by world number 40 Luca Brecel, while Stuart Bingham (13) lost 5–6 to world number 45 Noppon Saengkham, despite coming back from 0–5 behind to force a deciding frame. Eleven of the world's top-13-ranked players were eliminated before the last-16 stage of the tournament. Overall, just five seeded players reached the last 16: Ronnie O'Sullivan (4), Kyren Wilson (5), Barry Hawkins (14), Jack Lisowski (15), and Anthony McGill (16). All five seeds progressed to the quarter-finals, along with Zhao, Brecel, and world number 102 Andy Hicks.

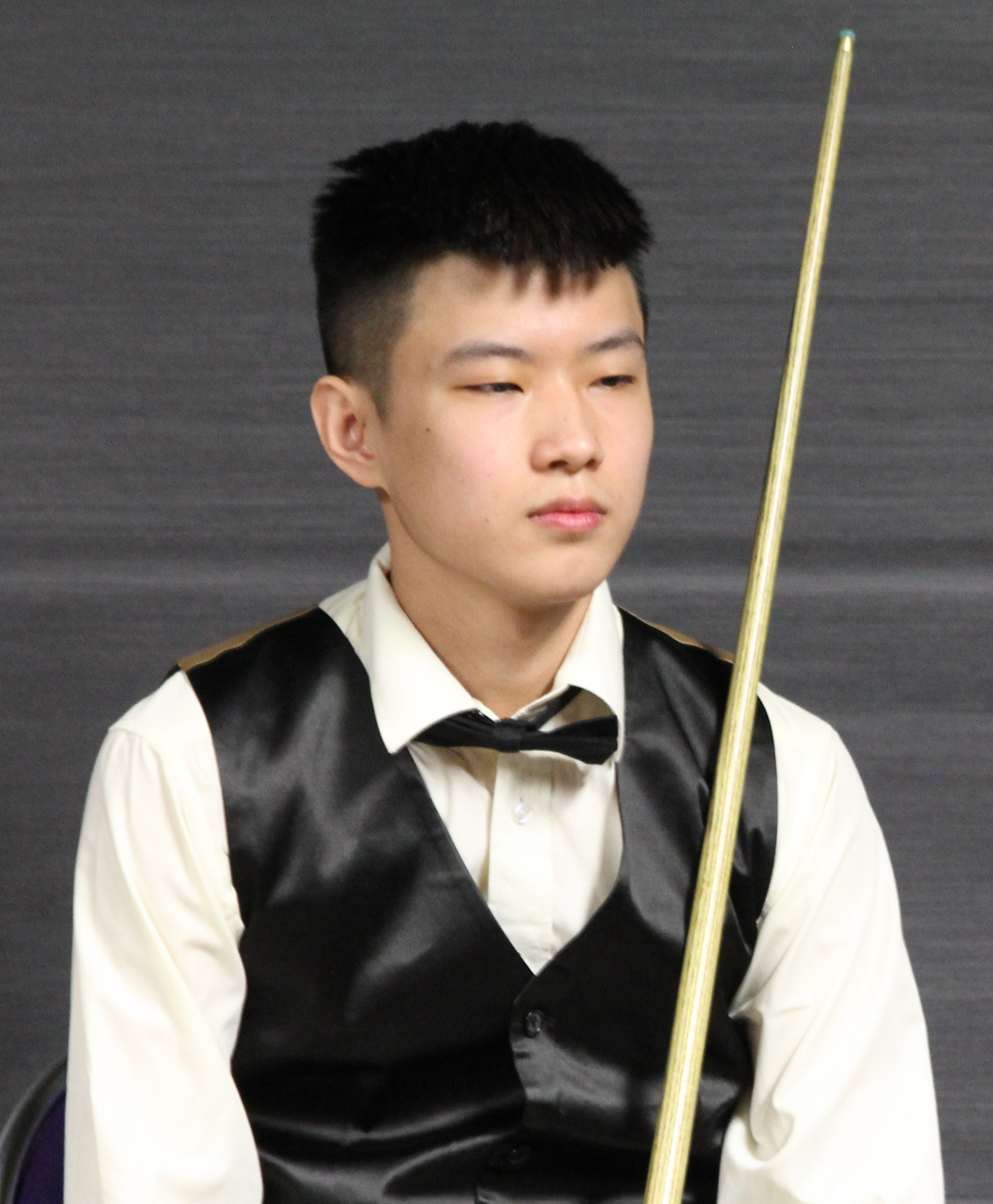
Zhao Xintong won the first ranking event of his career, defeating Luca Brecel 10–5 in the final.

In the quarter-finals, Wilson defeated seven-time champion O'Sullivan. During their match, O'Sullivan repeatedly complained to referee Jan Verhaas about audience members distracting him as they entered and exited the auditorium, and interrupted his breaks to sit in his chair for several minutes at a time while the crowd settled down. He also requested that a photographer be removed from the arena floor. O'Sullivan came from 3–5 behind to level the match, but Wilson won the deciding frame for a 6–5 victory. The other quarter-finals were more one-sided as Brecel defeated McGill 6–2, Zhao won six consecutive frames to beat Lisowski 6–2, and Hawkins defeated Hicks 6–1. In the first semi-final, Brecel defeated Wilson 6–4, compiling four century breaks and three other breaks over 50, to become the first player from continental Europe to reach a Triple Crown final. In the second semi-final, Zhao defeated Hawkins 6–1, making a century break and an additional five breaks over 70, to reach his first ranking final.

The final was played on 5 December 2021 between Brecel and Zhao as the best-of-19 frames held over two sessions. It was the first in the tournament's history not to feature a player in the top 16 in the world rankings, and the second not to feature a player from the United Kingdom (Australian Robertson defeated Chinese player Liang Wenbo in the 2015 final). Zhao led 5–3 after the afternoon session, and then won five of the seven frames played in the evening session to defeat Brecel 10–5 and win the first ranking title of his career. Zhao became the tournament's fourth non-British winner, after Ireland's Patsy Fagan, China's Ding, and Australia's Robertson. He also became the fourth player from mainland China to win a ranking title, after Ding, Liang, and Yan. He moved up from 26th to ninth in the world rankings, which secured his place in the 2022 Masters in January. As runner-up, Brecel moved up the rankings from 40th to 18th.

== Tournament draw ==
The draw for the event is shown below. Players in bold denote match winners.

=== Top half ===
==== Section 1 ====
Last 128; Best of 11 frames
1	Neil Robertson (AUS)	2
A	**John Astley** (ENG)	**6**
64	Andrew Higginson (ENG)	4
65	**Mark Joyce** (ENG)	**6**
32	Scott Donaldson (SCO)	4
97	**Farakh Ajaib** (PAK)	**6**
33	**Jordan Brown** (NIR)	**6**
96	Duane Jones (WAL)	4
16	**Anthony McGill** (SCO)	**6**
113	Iulian Boiko (UKR)	0
49	**David Grace** (ENG)	**6**
80	Peter Devlin (ENG)	2
17	**Zhou Yuelong** (CHN)	**6**
112	Chen Zifan (CHN)	1
48	Mark Davis (ENG)	4
81	**Ashley Hugill** (ENG)	**6**

Last 64; Best of 11 frames
A	(England) John Astley	4
65	(England) **Mark Joyce**	**6**
97	(Pakistan) Farakh Ajaib	1
33	(Northern Ireland) **Jordan Brown**	**6**
16	(Scotland) **Anthony McGill**	**6**
49	(England) David Grace	4
17	(China) **Zhou Yuelong**	**6**
81	(England) Ashley Hugill	2

Last 32; Best of 11 frames
65	(England) Mark Joyce	3
33	(Northern Ireland) **Jordan Brown**	**6**
16	(Scotland) **Anthony McGill**	**6**
17	(China) Zhou Yuelong	5

Last 16; Best of 11 frames
33	(Northern Ireland) Jordan Brown	3
16	(Scotland) **Anthony McGill**	**6**

==== Section 2 ====
Last 128; Best of 11 frames
41	**Li Hang** (CHN)	**6**
88	Mitchell Mann (ENG)	3
24	**Ricky Walden** (ENG)	**6**
105	Craig Steadman (ENG)	4
56	**Anthony Hamilton** (ENG)	**6**
73	Allan Taylor (ENG)	4
9	**Mark Williams** (WAL)	**6**
120	Lei Peifan (CHN)	3
40	**Luca Brecel** (BEL)	**6**
89	Xu Si (CHN)	2
25	**Tom Ford** (ENG)	**6**
104	Andrew Pagett (WAL)	1
57	**Tian Pengfei** (CHN)	**6**
72	Simon Lichtenberg (GER)	5
8	**Stephen Maguire** (SCO)	**6**
A	Sanderson Lam (ENG)	3

Last 64; Best of 11 frames
41	(China) Li Hang	3
24	(England) **Ricky Walden**	**6**
56	(England) **Anthony Hamilton**	**6**
9	(Wales) Mark Williams	5
40	(Belgium) **Luca Brecel**	**6**
25	(England) Tom Ford	5
57	(China) Tian Pengfei	1
8	**(Scotland) Stephen Maguire**	**6**

Last 32; Best of 11 frames
24	(England) Ricky Walden	4
56	(England) **Anthony Hamilton**	**6**
40	(Belgium) **Luca Brecel**	**6**
8	(Scotland) Stephen Maguire	0

Last 16; Best of 11 frames
56	(England) Anthony Hamilton	1
40	(Belgium) **Luca Brecel**	**6**

==== Section 3 ====
Last 128; Best of 11 frames
5	**Kyren Wilson** (ENG)	**6**
A	Soheil Vahedi (IRN)	2
60	**Jak Jones** (WAL)	**6**
69	Oliver Lines (ENG)	4
28	Lu Ning (CHN)	3
101	**Wu Yize** (CHN)	**6**
37	Matthew Stevens (WAL)	5
92	**Hammad Miah** (ENG)	**6**
12	**Yan Bingtao** (CHN)	**6**
117	Ng On-yee (HKG)	0
53	**Ben Woollaston** (ENG)	**6**
76	Rory McLeod (JAM)	4
21	**Gary Wilson** (ENG)	**6**
108	Ian Burns (ENG)	2
44	**Liam Highfield** (ENG)	**6**
85	Jamie Wilson (ENG)	3

Last 64; Best of 11 frames
5	(England) **Kyren Wilson**	**6**
60	(Wales) Jak Jones	0
101	(China) **Wu Yize**	**6**
92	(England) Hammad Miah	4
12	(China) Yan Bingtao	3
53	(England) **Ben Woollaston**	**6**
21	(England) Gary Wilson	4
44	(England) **Liam Highfield**	**6**

Last 32; Best of 11 frames
5	(England) **Kyren Wilson**	**6**
101	(China) Wu Yize	3
53	(England) **Ben Woollaston**	**6**
44	(England) Liam Highfield	4

Last 16; Best of 11 frames
5	(England) **Kyren Wilson**	**6**
53	(England) Ben Woollaston	3

==== Section 4 ====
Last 128; Best of 11 frames
45	**Noppon Saengkham** (THA)	**6**
84	Aaron Hill (IRL)	2
20	**Ali Carter** (ENG)	**6**
109	Jimmy White (ENG)	3
52	**Stuart Carrington** (ENG)	**6**
77	Zhao Jianbo (CHN)	1
13	**Stuart Bingham** (ENG)	**6**
116	Dean Young (SCO)	5
36	**Mark King** (ENG)	**6**
93	Jackson Page (WAL)	2
29	Kurt Maflin (NOR)	3
100	**Gerard Greene** (NIR)	**6**
61	Nigel Bond (ENG)	4
68	**Robbie Williams** (ENG)	**6**
4	**Ronnie O'Sullivan** (ENG)	**6**
A	Michael White (WAL)	3

Last 64; Best of 11 frames
45	**(Thailand) Noppon Saengkham**	**6**
20	(England) Ali Carter	3
52	(England) Stuart Carrington	2
13	(England) **Stuart Bingham**	**6**
36	(England) **Mark King**	**6**
100	(Northern Ireland) Gerard Greene	2
68	(England) Robbie Williams	2
4	(England) **Ronnie O'Sullivan**	**6**

Last 32; Best of 11 frames
45	(Thailand) **Noppon Saengkham**	**6**
13	(England) Stuart Bingham	5
36	(England) Mark King	3
4	(England) **Ronnie O'Sullivan**	**6**

Last 16; Best of 11 frames
45	(Thailand) Noppon Saengkham	3
4	**(England) Ronnie O'Sullivan**	**6**

=== Bottom half ===
==== Section 5 ====
Last 128; Best of 11 frames
3	**Judd Trump** (ENG)	**6**
A	David Lilley (ENG)	1
62	**Chris Wakelin** (ENG)	**6**
67	Jamie Clarke (WAL)	2
30	**Joe Perry** (ENG)	**6**
99	Fraser Patrick (SCO)	1
35	**Matthew Selt** (ENG)	**6**
94	Chang Bingyu (CHN)	5
14	**Barry Hawkins** (ENG)	**6**
115	Reanne Evans (ENG)	1
51	Lyu Haotian (CHN)	2
78	**Gao Yang** (CHN)	**6**
19	**Martin Gould** (ENG)	**6**
110	Barry Pinches (ENG)	1
46	Jamie Jones (WAL)	1
83	**Cao Yupeng** (CHN)	**6**

Last 64; Best of 11 frames
3	(England) **Judd Trump**	**6**
62	(England) Chris Wakelin	3
30	(England) Joe Perry	2
35	(England) **Matthew Selt**	**6**
14	(England) **Barry Hawkins**	**6**
78	(China) Gao Yang	1
19	(England) Martin Gould	3
83	(China) **Cao Yupeng**	**6**

Last 32; Best of 11 frames
3	(England) Judd Trump	3
35	(England) **Matthew Selt**	**6**
14	**(England) Barry Hawkins**	**6**
83	(China) Cao Yupeng	2

Last 16; Best of 11 frames
35	(England) Matthew Selt	3
14	(England) **Barry Hawkins**	**6**

==== Section 6 ====
Last 128; Best of 11 frames
43	**Alexander Ursenbacher** (SUI)	**6**
86	Ben Hancorn (ENG)	5
22	**David Gilbert** (ENG)	**6**
107	Alfie Burden (ENG)	1
54	**Joe O'Connor** (ENG)	**6**
75	Fergal O'Brien (IRL)	4
11	**Mark Allen** (NIR)	**6**
118	Michael Judge (IRL)	2
38	**Michael Holt** (ENG)	**6**
91	Zak Surety (ENG)	4
27	Liang Wenbo (CHN)	5
102	**Andy Hicks** (ENG)	**6**
59	**Dominic Dale** (WAL)	**6**
70	Ashley Carty (ENG)	4
6	Shaun Murphy (ENG)	5
A	**Si Jiahui** (CHN)	**6**

Last 64; Best of 11 frames
43	(Switzerland) Alexander Ursenbacher	3
22	(England) **David Gilbert**	**6**
54	(England) Joe O'Connor	4
11	(Northern Ireland) **Mark Allen**	**6**
38	(England) Michael Holt	5
102	(England) **Andy Hicks**	**6**
59	(Wales) **Dominic Dale**	**6**
A	(China) Si Jiahui	4

Last 32; Best of 11 frames
22	(England) **David Gilbert**	**6**
11	(Northern Ireland) Mark Allen	5
102	(England) **Andy Hicks**	**6**
59	(Wales) Dominic Dale	5

Last 16; Best of 11 frames
22	(England) David Gilbert	5
102	(England) **Andy Hicks**	**6**

==== Section 7 ====
Last 128; Best of 11 frames
7	**John Higgins** (SCO)	**6**
A	Michael Georgiou (CYP)	1
58	**Sunny Akani** (THA)	**6**
71	Steven Hallworth (ENG)	2
26	**Zhao Xintong** (CHN)	**6**
103	Yuan Sijun (CHN)	4
39	**Thepchaiya Un-Nooh** (THA)	**6**
90	Stephen Hendry (SCO)	1
10	**Ding Junhui** (CHN)	**6**
119	Zhang Anda (CHN)	2
55	**Sam Craigie** (ENG)	**6**
74	Ken Doherty (IRL)	3
23	Ryan Day (WAL)	3
106	**Peter Lines** (ENG)	**6**
42	Elliot Slessor (ENG)	5
87	**Fan Zhengyi** (CHN)	**6**

Last 64; Best of 11 frames
7	(Scotland) **John Higgins**	**6**
58	(Thailand) Sunny Akani	3
26	(China) **Zhao Xintong**	**6**
39	(Thailand) Thepchaiya Un-Nooh	5
10	(China) Ding Junhui	3
55	(England) **Sam Craigie**	**6**
106	(England) **Peter Lines**	**6**
87	(China) Fan Zhengyi	3

Last 32; Best of 11 frames
7	(Scotland) John Higgins	5
26	(China) **Zhao Xintong**	**6**
55	(England) Sam Craigie	3
106	(England) **Peter Lines**	**6**

Last 16; Best of 11 frames
26	(China) **Zhao Xintong**	**6**
106	(England) Peter Lines	4

==== Section 8 ====
Last 128; Best of 11 frames
47	**Jimmy Robertson** (ENG)	**6**
A	Bai Langning (CHN)	5
18	**Graeme Dott** (SCO)	**6**
111	Jamie O'Neill (ENG)	3
50	**Martin O'Donnell** (ENG)	**6**
79	Lukas Kleckers (GER)	3
15	**Jack Lisowski** (ENG)	**6**
114	Sean Maddocks (ENG)	0
34	**Robert Milkins** (ENG)	**6**
95	Louis Heathcote (ENG)	4
31	**Xiao Guodong** (CHN)	**6**
98	Zhang Jiankang (CHN)	2
63	**Hossein Vafaei** (IRN)	**6**
66	Pang Junxu (CHN)	4
2	**Mark Selby** (ENG)	**6**
A	Ross Muir (SCO)	2

Last 64; Best of 11 frames
47	(England) Jimmy Robertson	2
18	**(Scotland) Graeme Dott**	**6**
50	(England) Martin O'Donnell	4
15	(England) **Jack Lisowski**	**6**
34	(England) Robert Milkins	2
31	(China) **Xiao Guodong**	**6**
63	(Iran) **Hossein Vafaei**	**6**
2	(England) Mark Selby	2

Last 32; Best of 11 frames
18	(Scotland) Graeme Dott	2
15	(England) **Jack Lisowski**	**6**
31	(China) Xiao Guodong	2
63	(Iran) **Hossein Vafaei**	**6**

Last 16; Best of 11 frames
15	(England) **Jack Lisowski**	**6**
63	(Iran) Hossein Vafaei	4

=== Finals ===
**Quarter-finals**; Best of 11 frames
16	(Scotland) Anthony McGill	2
40	(Belgium) **Luca Brecel**	**6**
5	(England) **Kyren Wilson**	**6**
4	(England) Ronnie O'Sullivan	5
14	(England) **Barry Hawkins**	**6**
102	(England) Andy Hicks	1
26	(China) **Zhao Xintong**	**6**
15	(England) Jack Lisowski	2

**Semi-finals**; Best of 11 frames
40	(Belgium) **Luca Brecel**	**6**
5	(England) Kyren Wilson	4
14	(England) Barry Hawkins	1
26	(China) **Zhao Xintong**	**6**

**Final**; Best of 19 frames
40	(Belgium) Luca Brecel	5
26	(China) **Zhao Xintong**	**10**

=== Final ===
Final: Best of 19 frames. Referee: Ben Williams; York Barbican, York, England, 5 December 2021
Luca Brecel (40); Belgium	5–**10**	**Zhao Xintong** (26); China
Afternoon: 4–**79**, **133**–0 (133), 25–**90**, **80**–19, 12–**92**, 40–**67**, **60**–47, 17–**85**; Evening: 0–**87**, 9–**120** (120), **71**–31, 6–**69**, **97**–13, 19–**71**, 0–**99**
**133**	Highest break	120
1	Century breaks	1

== Century breaks ==
A total of 119 century breaks were made during the tournament. Gary Wilson made the highest, his fourth career maximum break, in his first-round match against Ian Burns.

- 147, 104 – Gary Wilson
- 142, 115 – Fergal O'Brien
- 139, 131, 120, 115, 108 – Ronnie O'Sullivan
- 139 – Li Hang
- 138, 129, 128, 103 – Dominic Dale
- 138 – Zhang Anda
- 136, 129, 107, 106, 100 – Thepchaiya Un-Nooh
- 136, 118 – Ben Woollaston
- 135, 133, 130, 117 – Anthony McGill
- 135 – Louis Heathcote
- 135 – Andy Hicks
- 134, 131, 112 – John Higgins
- 134, 129 – Ding Junhui
- 134, 101 – Ali Carter
- 133, 130, 112, 112, 105, 102 – Luca Brecel
- 132, 131, 109 – Graeme Dott
- 132, 100 – Judd Trump
- 131, 128, 121, 119, 103, 100 – Noppon Saengkham
- 131, 115 – David Gilbert
- 131 – Gerard Greene
- 130 – Aaron Hill
- 130 – Ashley Hugill
- 129, 102 – Ricky Walden
- 128 – Jordan Brown
- 128 – Matthew Selt
- 128 – Craig Steadman
- 127, 105, 104, 100 – Stephen Maguire
- 126, 110 – Jack Lisowski
- 125 – Duane Jones
- 124 – Neil Robertson
- 122, 121, 118, 102, 102 – Cao Yupeng
- 122, 120, 120, 114, 110, 100 – Zhao Xintong
- 121, 117, 115, 113, 110, 102 – Kyren Wilson
- 120 – Ian Burns
- 120 – Gao Yang
- 119 – John Astley
- 118 – Yuan Sijun
- 115, 109 – Wu Yize
- 115, 105 – Hossein Vafaei
- 114, 113 – Robbie Williams
- 114 – Ben Hancorn
- 113 – Stuart Carrington
- 113 – Peter Lines
- 113 – Kurt Maflin
- 112, 106 – Mark Williams
- 111 – Simon Lichtenberg
- 111 – Joe Perry
- 110 – Fan Zhengyi
- 107, 100 – Yan Bingtao
- 107 – Scott Donaldson
- 105 – Ashley Carty
- 105 – Sam Craigie
- 104 – David Grace
- 104 – Allan Taylor
- 103, 103 – Barry Hawkins
- 103 – Martin Gould
- 102 – Michael White
- 101 – Mark King
- 101 – Lei Peifan
