= 2021 Champion of Champions =

Snooker tournament

2021 Cazoo Champion of Champions
Tournament information
- Dates: 15–21 November 2021
- Venue: University of Bolton Stadium
- City: Bolton
- Country: England
- Organisation: Matchroom Sport
- Format: Non-ranking event
- Total prize fund: £440,000
- Winner's share: £150,000
- Highest break: Yan Bingtao (CHN) (140)

Final
- Champion: Judd Trump (ENG)
- Runner-up: John Higgins (SCO)
- Score: 10–4

The 2021 Champion of Champions (officially the 2021 Cazoo Champion of Champions) was a professional snooker tournament that took place between 15 and 21 November 2021 at the University of Bolton Stadium in Bolton, England. It was the 11th Champion of Champions event, the first of which was held in 1978. The tournament featured 16 participants, primarily winners of significant tournaments since the previous year's event. As an invitational tournament, it carried no world ranking points.

Mark Allen was the defending champion, but he withdrew from the event for personal reasons. His place was awarded to Ding Junhui, the next eligible player on the world ranking list.

Judd Trump faced John Higgins in the final. Although Higgins took a 3–0 lead, Trump won ten of the next 11 frames to secure a 10–4 victory and his first Champion of Champions title with its prize of £100,000. Trump lost just five frames across the four matches he played in the tournament.

== Format ==
=== Prize fund ===
- Winner: £150,000
- Runner-up: £60,000
- Semi-final: £30,000
- Group runner-up: £17,500
- First round loser: £12,500
- Total: £440,000

=== Qualification ===
Qualification for the event was made through winning events from the previous year. Events shown below in grey are for players who had already qualified for the event. The 2021 World Snooker Championship runner-up Shaun Murphy was awarded a position in the event as well as remaining players being made up by the highest ranked players in the world rankings. Mark Allen, who had qualified as defending champion, withdrew prior to the event during the 2021 English Open.

Qualification table
Tournament	Date of tournament final	Winner
~~2020 Champion of Champions~~	~~8 November 2020~~	~~Mark Allen (NIR)~~
2020 UK Championship	6 December 2020	Neil Robertson (AUS)
2021 Masters	17 January 2021	Yan Bingtao (CHN)
2021 World Championship	3 May 2021	Mark Selby (ENG)
2020 World Grand Prix (2020–21 season)	20 December 2020	Judd Trump (ENG)
2021 German Masters	31 January 2021	Judd Trump (ENG)
2021 Players Championship	28 February 2021	John Higgins (SCO)
2021 WST Pro Series	21 March 2021	Mark Williams (WAL)
2021 Championship League Invitational	2 April 2021	Kyren Wilson (ENG)
2021 Tour Championship	28 March 2021	Neil Robertson (AUS)
2021 Championship League (2021–22 season)	13 August 2021	David Gilbert (ENG)
2021 British Open	22 August 2021	Mark Williams (WAL)
2020 Northern Ireland Open	22 November 2020	Judd Trump (ENG)
2020 Scottish Open	13 December 2020	Mark Selby (ENG)
2021 Welsh Open	21 February 2021	Jordan Brown (NIR)
~~2021 Northern Ireland Open~~	~~17 October 2021~~	~~Mark Allen (NIR)~~
2021 English Open	7 November 2021	Neil Robertson (AUS)
2021 World Championship (runner-up)	3 May 2021	Shaun Murphy (ENG)
2021 Gibraltar Open	7 March 2021	Judd Trump (ENG)
2021 Shoot Out	7 February 2021	Ryan Day (WAL)
2021 World Seniors Championship	9 May 2021	David Lilley (ENG)
Qualified through the world rankings	22 August 2021	Ronnie O'Sullivan (ENG)
Qualified through the world rankings	17 October 2021	Stephen Maguire (SCO)
Qualified through the world rankings	17 October 2021	Ding Junhui (CHN)
Qualified through the world rankings	7 November 2021	Stuart Bingham (ENG)

Player also qualified by winning another tournament

== Tournament draw ==
Group semi-finals (last 16); Best of 7 frames
Judd Trump (ENG) (1)	4
David Lilley (ENG)	1
Group 1 (15 November)
Ryan Day (WAL)	4
Stephen Maguire (SCO) (8)	2
Kyren Wilson (ENG) (5)	4
Jordan Brown (NIR)	2
Group 4 (16 November)
Mark Williams (WAL)	2
Neil Robertson (AUS) (4)	4
Ronnie O'Sullivan (ENG) (3)	4
Stuart Bingham (ENG)	2
Group 3 (18 November)
Ding Junhui (CHN)	3
John Higgins (SCO) (6)	4
Shaun Murphy (ENG) (7)	1
Yan Bingtao (CHN)	4
Group 2 (17 November)
David Gilbert (ENG)	3
Mark Selby (ENG) (2)	4

Group finals (quarter-finals); Best of 11 frames
(England) Judd Trump (1)	6
(Wales) Ryan Day	0
(England) Kyren Wilson (5)	6
(Australia) Neil Robertson (4)	4
(England) Ronnie O'Sullivan (3)	1
(Scotland) John Higgins (6)	6
(China) Yan Bingtao	6
(England) Mark Selby (2)	3

Semi-finals; Best of 11 frames
(England) Judd Trump (1)	6
(England) Kyren Wilson (5)	0
(Scotland) John Higgins (6)	6
(China) Yan Bingtao	5

Final; Best of 19 frames
(England) Judd Trump (1)	10
(Scotland) John Higgins (6)	4

=== Final ===
Final: Best of 19 frames. Referee: Paul Collier; Bolton Whites Hotel, Bolton, England, 21 November 2021
Judd Trump (1); England	10–4	John Higgins (6); Scotland
Afternoon: 0–100 (73), 0–86, 43–75, 76–0 (63), 100–32 (62), 61–1 (61), 74–6, 66–0, 0–70 (70); Evening: 74–9 (74), 71–24, 85–47 (51), 117–0 (68), 73–23 (59)
74	Highest break	70
0	Century breaks	0
7	50+ breaks	2

== Century breaks ==
A total of 12 century breaks were made during the tournament.

- 140 – Yan Bingtao
- 132, 131 – Mark Selby
- 127 – John Higgins
- 114, 113, 112 – Kyren Wilson
- 107, 100 – Neil Robertson
- 104 – Judd Trump
- 104 – Mark Williams
- 101 – Ronnie O'Sullivan
