= Jordan Brown (snooker player) =

Northern Irish snooker player

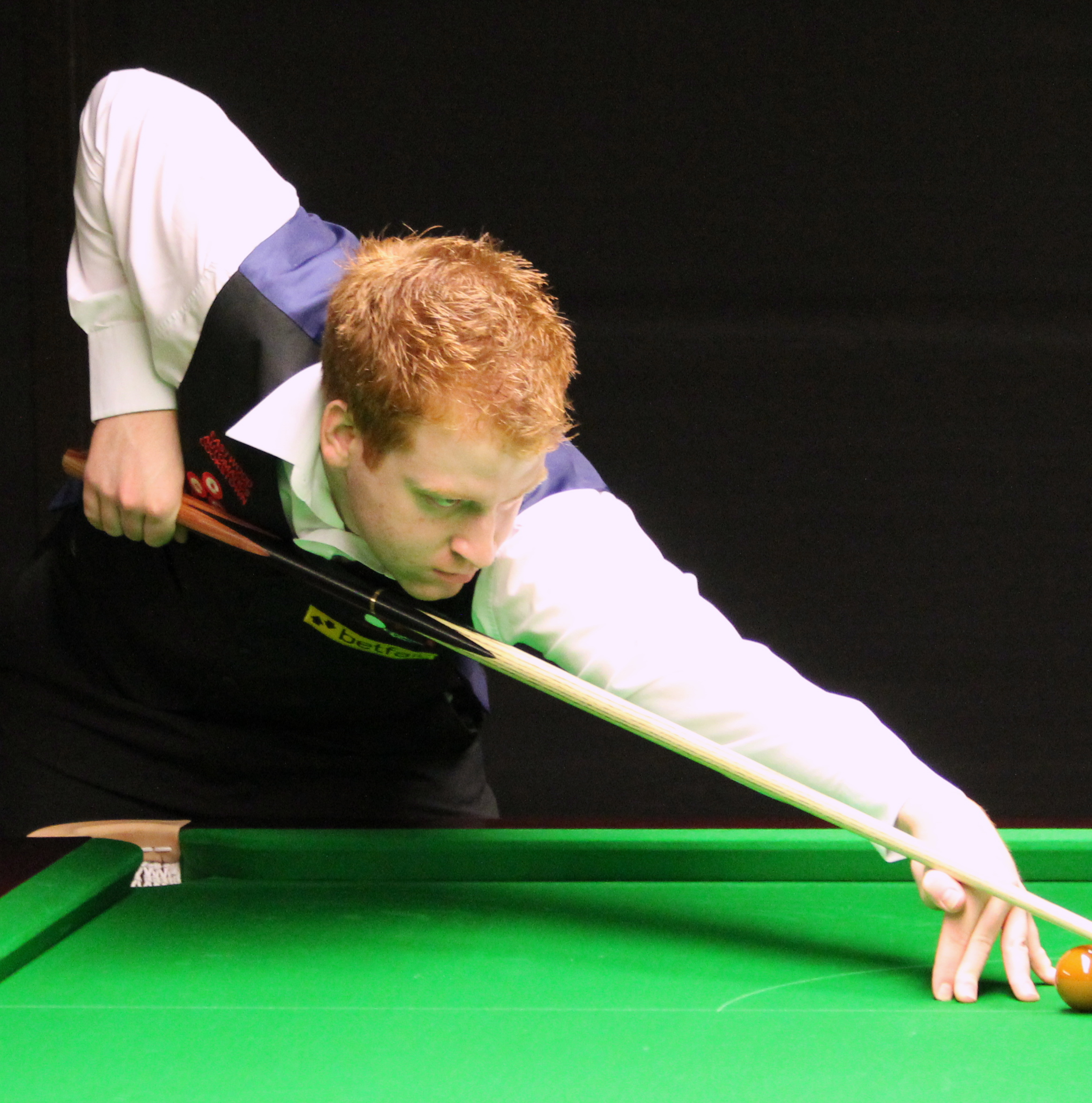
- Brown at the 2012 Paul Hunter Classic

Personal information
- Nickname: The Antrim Ferrari
- Born: 9 October 1987 (age 39) Antrim, Northern Ireland

Sport
- Country: Northern Ireland
- Sport: Snooker
- Professional: 2009/2010, 2018–present
- Highest ranking: 22 (May 2022)
- Current ranking: 64 (as of 26 October 2026)

Tournament wins
- Ranking: 1

Jordan Brown (born 9 October 1987) is a Northern Irish professional snooker player. After winning back-to-back Northern Ireland Amateur Championships in 2008 and 2009, he made his debut on the professional tour in 2009–10 but lost his tour card after one season. He rejoined the tour via the 2018 Q School.

He made his Crucible debut at the 2020 World Snooker Championship. In January 2021, he reached the quarter-final of the German Masters, and in February 2021, he won his first ranking title at the Welsh Open, defeating Ronnie O'Sullivan 9–8 in the final. Ranked 81st in the world before the event, and rated a 750–1 outsider by bookmakers, he became the lowest-ranked player to win a ranking event since 1993.

== Career ==
After winning the Northern Ireland Amateur Championship in 2008 and 2009, Brown received a tour card for the 2009–10 snooker season but lasted only one season on the tour. As an occasional wild card entrant to ranking events, he enjoyed some notable victories, such as defeating John Higgins 4–3 in the 2012 Scottish Open. In 2016, he competed in the inaugural Northern Ireland Open, where he defeated world number 26 Ben Woollaston 4–2 in the first round before losing to Kyren Wilson in the second round by the same scoreline.

Brown entered the 2018 Q School in a bid to rejoin the professional tour. Although he lost to Jak Jones in the final round of the first event, he secured his place at the second event after beating Andy Hicks and Jamie Cope.

In the 2020 World Snooker Championship qualifiers, he defeated Rory McLeod, Hossein Vafaei and Ryan Day to reach the Crucible for the first time. His debut ended with a 6–10 first-round loss to Mark Selby.

In January 2021, he reached the quarter-final of the German Masters but lost 1–5 to Barry Hawkins. At the Welsh Open in February 2021, he defeated Selby 5–4 in the quarter-final, Stephen Maguire 6–1 in the semi-final and Ronnie O'Sullivan 9–8 in the final to capture his maiden ranking title, winning a prize of £70,000. Ranked 81st in the world before the tournament, Brown became the lowest-ranked player to win a ranking event since world number 93 Dave Harold won the Asian Open in 1993. He also became the fourth Northern Irish player to claim a ranking title, after Alex Higgins, Dennis Taylor and Mark Allen.

== Personal life ==
He got married in May 2024 and they have one daughter together.

== Performance and rankings timeline ==
Tournament	2009/ 10	2010/ 11	2011/ 12	2012/ 13	2013/ 14	2014/ 15	2015/ 16	2016/ 17	2017/ 18	2018/ 19	2019/ 20	2020/ 21	2021/ 22	2022/ 23	2023/ 24	2024/ 25	2025/ 26	2026/ 27
Ranking (Note: It shows the ranking at the beginning of the season)	(Note: New players don't have a ranking)	(Note: He was an amateur)									79	(Note: Players qualified One Year Ranking List started the season without ranking points)	40	22	36	44	53	64
Ranking tournaments
Championship League	Non-Ranking Event											2R	RR	2R	RR	RR	RR	RR
China Open	LQ	A	A	A	A	A	LQ	A	A	LQ	Tournament Not Held							LQ
Wuhan Open	Tournament Not Held														1R	1R	1R	LQ
British Open	Tournament Not Held												3R	3R	LQ	LQ	LQ	1R
English Open	Tournament Not Held							A	A	3R	1R	2R	LQ	LQ	LQ	LQ	LQ	1R
Shenzhen Open (Note: The event was called the Xi'an Grand Prix (2024/2025–2025/2026))	Tournament Not Held															1R	1R	LQ
Northern Ireland Open	Tournament Not Held							2R	1R	1R	2R	1R	LQ	2R	2R	1R	QF	3R
International Championship	Not Held			A	A	A	A	A	A	1R	LQ	Not Held			SF	LQ	LQ	LQ
UK Championship	LQ	A	A	A	A	A	1R	A	A	1R	2R	2R	4R	1R	LQ	LQ	LQ	
Shoot Out	Non-Ranking Event							A	A	1R	2R	2R	2R	2R	2R	1R	2R	
Scottish Open	Not Held			MR	Not Held			A	A	1R	1R	2R	1R	LQ	1R	1R	LQ	
German Masters	NH	A	A	LQ	A	A	A	A	A	LQ	LQ	QF	LQ	LQ	2R	LQ	1R	
Welsh Open	LQ	A	A	LQ	A	A	1R	A	A	1R	2R	W	LQ	1R	1R	1R	LQ	
World Grand Prix	Tournament Not Held					NR	DNQ	DNQ	DNQ	DNQ	DNQ	DNQ	1R	DNQ	1R	DNQ	DNQ	
Players Championship (Note: The event was also called the Players Tour Championship Grand Final (2010/2011–2015/2016))	NH	DNQ	DNQ	DNQ	DNQ	DNQ	DNQ	DNQ	DNQ	DNQ	DNQ	1R	DNQ	DNQ	DNQ	DNQ	DNQ	
World Open (Note: The event was also called the Grand Prix (2009/2010))	LQ	A	A	A	A	Not Held		A	A	LQ	1R	Not Held			1R	1R	LQ	
Tour Championship	Tournament Not Held									DNQ	DNQ	DNQ	DNQ	DNQ	DNQ	DNQ	DNQ	
World Championship	LQ	A	A	A	A	A	A	LQ	LQ	LQ	1R	LQ	LQ	LQ	LQ	LQ	LQ	
Non-ranking tournaments
Champion of Champions	Tournament Not Held				A	A	A	A	A	A	A	A	1R	A	A	A	A	
Masters	LQ	A	A	A	A	A	A	A	A	A	A	A	A	A	A	A	A	
Championship League	A	A	A	A	A	A	A	A	A	A	RR	A	RR	RR	RR	A	A	
Former ranking tournaments
Shanghai Masters	LQ	A	A	A	A	A	LQ	A	A	Non-Ranking		Not Held			Non-Ranking Event			
Paul Hunter Classic	PA	Minor-Ranking Event						A	A	3R	NR	Tournament Not Held						
Indian Open	Tournament Not Held				A	A	NH	A	A	LQ	Tournament Not Held							
Riga Masters (Note: The event was called the Riga Open (2014/2015–2015/2016))	Tournament Not Held					Minor-Rank		A	A	LQ	LQ	Tournament Not Held						
China Championship	Tournament Not Held							NR	A	LQ	2R	Tournament Not Held						
WST Pro Series	Tournament Not Held											RR	Tournament Not Held					
Turkish Masters	Tournament Not Held												2R	Tournament Not Held				
Gibraltar Open	Tournament Not Held						MR	A	A	1R	1R	1R	4R	Tournament Not Held				
WST Classic	Tournament Not Held													1R	Tournament Not Held			
European Masters	Tournament Not Held							A	A	LQ	LQ	2R	3R	1R	1R	Not Held		
Saudi Arabia Masters	Tournament Not Held															4R	3R	NH
Former non-ranking tournaments
Six-red World Championship (Note: The event was called the Six-red World Grand Prix (2009/2010))	A	A	NH	A	A	A	A	A	A	A	A	Not Held		RR	Tournament Not Held			
Haining Open	Tournament Not Held					Minor-Rank		A	A	A	1R	NH	A	A	Tournament Not Held			

Performance Table Legend
LQ	lost in the qualifying draw	#R	lost in the early rounds of the tournament (WR = Wildcard round, RR = Round robin)	QF	lost in the quarter-final
SF	lost in the semi-final	F	lost in the final	W	won the tournament
DNQ	did not qualify for the tournament	A	did not participate in the tournament	WD	withdrew from the tournament

NH / Not Held	event was not held.
NR / Non-Ranking Event	event is/was no longer a ranking event.
R / Ranking Event	event is/was a ranking event.
MR / Minor-Ranking Event	event is/was a minor-ranking event.

== Career finals ==
=== Ranking finals: 1 (1 title) ===
Outcome	No.	Year	Championship	Opponent in the final	Score
Winner	1.	2021	Welsh Open	(England) Ronnie O'Sullivan	9–8

=== Pro-am finals: 7 (5 titles) ===
Outcome	No.	Year	Championship	Opponent in the final	Score
Runner-up	1.	2006	Barry McNamee Memorial Trophy	(Northern Ireland) Joe Swail	1–6
Winner	1.	2009	Barry McNamee Memorial Trophy	(Northern Ireland) Joe Swail	3–1
Winner	2.	2013	Barry McNamee Memorial Trophy (2)	(Republic of Ireland) Colm Gilcreest	3–1
Winner	3.	2017	Mark Allen Classic	(Republic of Ireland) Fergal O'Brien	5–1
Runner-up	2.	2018	Barry McNamee Memorial Trophy (2)	(Republic of Ireland) Rodney Goggins	1–3
Winner	4.	2018	Mark Allen Classic (2)	(Northern Ireland) Mark Allen	5–1
Winner	5.	2019	Mark Allen Classic (3)	(England) Barry Hawkins	5–4

=== Amateur finals: 9 (4 titles) ===
Outcome	No.	Year	Championship	Opponent in the final	Score
Winner	1.	2008	Northern Ireland Amateur Championship	(Northern Ireland) Julian Logue	10–9
Runner-up	1.	2008	All-Ireland Amateur Championship	(Republic of Ireland) Vincent Muldoon	2–5
Winner	2.	2009	Northern Ireland Amateur Championship (2)	(Northern Ireland) Dermot McGlinchey	10–4
Runner-up	2.	2013	Northern Ireland Amateur Championship	(Northern Ireland) Patrick Wallace	4–10
Runner-up	3.	2015	Northern Ireland Amateur Championship (2)	(Northern Ireland) Patrick Wallace	2–10
Runner-up	4.	2016	Northern Ireland Amateur Championship (3)	(Northern Ireland) Patrick Wallace	8–10
Winner	3.	2017	Northern Ireland Amateur Championship (3)	(Northern Ireland) Dermot McGlinchey	10–8
Runner-up	5.	2018	EBSA European Snooker Championship	(England) Harvey Chandler	2–7
Winner	4.	2018	Northern Ireland Amateur Championship (4)	(Northern Ireland) Patrick Wallace	10–5
