= Northern Ireland Billiards and Snooker Association =

National governing body for snooker and English billiards

The Northern Ireland Billiards and Snooker Association, or NIBSA, is the national governing body for Snooker and Billiards in Northern Ireland, recognised by the Sports Council for Northern Ireland, Sport NI.

NIBSA are affiliated to the European Billiards and Snooker Association (EBSA). As the National Governing body for cue sports in Northern Ireland, NIBSA are also affiliated to the World Snooker Federation.

Mark Allen received Lottery Funding via NIBSA while an amateur player, facilitating his growth and development in the sport.
