= 2023 Championship League (invitational) =

Professional snooker tournament

2023 Championship League Invitational
Tournament information
- Dates: 19 December 2022 – 2 March 2023
- Venue: Morningside Arena
- City: Leicester
- Country: England
- Organisation: Matchroom Sport
- Format: Non-ranking event
- Total prize fund: £184,200
- Winner's share: £10,000 (plus bonuses)
- Highest break: John Higgins (SCO) (144)

Final
- Champion: John Higgins (SCO)
- Runner-up: Judd Trump (ENG)
- Score: 3–1

The 2023 Championship League Invitational was a professional non-ranking snooker tournament, which took place from 19 December 2022 to 2 March 2023 at the Morningside Arena in Leicester, England.

John Higgins defended his title, winning the tournament for the fourth time after beating Judd Trump 3–1 in the final.

== Prize fund ==
The breakdown of prize money for the 2023 Championship League is shown below.

Groups 1–7

- Winner: £3,000
- Runner-up: £2,000
- Semi-final: £1,000
- Frame-win (league stage): £100
- Frame-win (play-offs): £300
- Highest break: £500

Winners' Group

- Winner: £10,000
- Runner-up: £5,000
- Semi-final: £3,000
- Frame-win (league stage): £200
- Frame-win (play-offs): £300
- Highest break: £1,000

- Tournament total: £184,200

== Group 1 ==
Group 1 was played on 19 and 20 December 2022. Jack Lisowski won the group and qualified for the Winners' Group.

=== Matches ===
- Jack Lisowski 3–1 Jimmy Robertson
- Ryan Day 3–2 Jordan Brown
- Jack Lisowski 3–1 Ali Carter
- Stuart Bingham 2–3 Matthew Selt
- Jimmy Robertson 1–3 Ryan Day
- Ali Carter 0–3 Matthew Selt
- Jack Lisowski 1–3 Ryan Day
- Jordan Brown 3–1 Stuart Bingham
- Ryan Day 3–2 Ali Carter
- Jimmy Robertson 2–3 Jordan Brown
- Ali Carter 3–0 Stuart Bingham
- Jack Lisowski 3–0 Matthew Selt
- Jordan Brown 1–3 Matthew Selt
- Jimmy Robertson 2–3 Stuart Bingham
- Jordan Brown 3–2 Ali Carter
- Stuart Bingham 3–1 Ryan Day
- Jimmy Robertson 1–3 Ali Carter
- Ryan Day 3–2 Matthew Selt
- Jack Lisowski 1–3 Stuart Bingham
- Jimmy Robertson 3–1 Matthew Selt
- Jack Lisowski 1–3 Jordan Brown

=== Table ===
Pos	Player	Pld	W	L	FF	FA	FD	
1	Ryan Day (WAL)	6	5	1	16	11	+5	Qualification to Group 1 play-off
2	Jordan Brown (NIR)	6	4	2	15	12	+3	Qualification to Group 1 play-off
3	Jack Lisowski (ENG)	6	3	3	12	11	+1	Qualification to Group 1 play-off
4	Matthew Selt (ENG)	6	3	3	12	12	0	Qualification to Group 1 play-off
5	Stuart Bingham (ENG)	6	3	3	12	13	−1	Advances into Group 2
6	Ali Carter (ENG)	6	2	4	11	13	−2	Eliminated from the competition
7	Jimmy Robertson (ENG)	6	1	5	10	16	−6	Eliminated from the competition

=== Play-offs ===
Semi-finals; Best of 5 frames
Ryan Day (WAL)	2
Matthew Selt (ENG)	3
Jordan Brown (NIR)	2
Jack Lisowski (ENG)	3

Final; Best of 5 frames
Matthew Selt (ENG)	1
Jack Lisowski (ENG)	3

== Group 2 ==
Group 2 was played on 21 and 22 December 2022. Stuart Bingham won the group and qualified for the Winners' Group.

=== Matches ===
- Barry Hawkins 1–3 Ryan Day
- Jamie Jones 3–1 Stuart Bingham
- Barry Hawkins 0–3 Jordan Brown
- Robert Milkins 3–2 Matthew Selt
- Ryan Day 3–0 Jamie Jones
- Jordan Brown 0–3 Matthew Selt
- Barry Hawkins 3–0 Jamie Jones
- Stuart Bingham 1–3 Robert Milkins
- Jamie Jones 0–3 Jordan Brown
- Stuart Bingham 3–2 Ryan Day
- Jordan Brown 3–1 Robert Milkins
- Barry Hawkins 1–3 Matthew Selt
- Stuart Bingham 0–3 Matthew Selt
- Ryan Day 2–3 Robert Milkins
- Stuart Bingham 3–1 Jordan Brown
- Barry Hawkins 2–3 Robert Milkins
- Ryan Day 1–3 Jordan Brown
- Jamie Jones 3–2 Matthew Selt
- Robert Milkins 2–3 Jamie Jones
- Barry Hawkins 1–3 Stuart Bingham
- Ryan Day 0–3 Matthew Selt

=== Table ===
Pos	Player	Pld	W	L	FF	FA	FD	
1	Matthew Selt (ENG)	6	4	2	16	7	+9	Qualification to Group 2 play-off
2	Robert Milkins (ENG)	6	4	2	15	13	+2	Qualification to Group 2 play-off
3	Jordan Brown (NIR)	6	4	2	13	8	+5	Qualification to Group 2 play-off
4	Stuart Bingham (ENG)	6	3	3	11	13	−2	Qualification to Group 2 play-off
5	Jamie Jones (WAL)	6	3	3	9	14	−5	Advances into Group 3
6	Ryan Day (WAL)	6	2	4	11	13	−2	Eliminated from the competition
7	Barry Hawkins (ENG)	6	1	5	8	15	−7	Eliminated from the competition

=== Play-offs ===
Semi-finals; Best of 5 frames
Matthew Selt (ENG)	2
Stuart Bingham (ENG)	3
Robert Milkins (ENG)	3
Jordan Brown (NIR)	2

Final; Best of 5 frames
Stuart Bingham (ENG)	3
Robert Milkins (ENG)	1

== Group 3 ==
Group 3 was played on 3 and 4 January 2023. Kyren Wilson won the group and qualified for the Winners' Group.

=== Matches ===
- Mark Selby 2–3 Matthew Selt
- Ricky Walden 3–1 Jamie Jones
- Mark Selby 3–1 Jordan Brown
- Kyren Wilson 3–1 Robert Milkins
- Ricky Walden 3–1 Matthew Selt
- Jordan Brown 1–3 Robert Milkins
- Mark Selby 3–1 Ricky Walden
- Kyren Wilson 3–1 Jamie Jones
- Ricky Walden 3–2 Jordan Brown
- Matthew Selt 3–2 Jamie Jones
- Kyren Wilson 2–3 Jordan Brown
- Mark Selby 3–2 Robert Milkins
- Kyren Wilson 3–1 Matthew Selt
- Jamie Jones 0–3 Robert Milkins
- Kyren Wilson 0–3 Ricky Walden
- Jordan Brown 1–3 Jamie Jones
- Ricky Walden 3–1 Robert Milkins
- Jordan Brown 3–0 Matthew Selt
- Mark Selby 2–3 Kyren Wilson
- Mark Selby 1–3 Jamie Jones
- Matthew Selt 3–1 Robert Milkins

=== Table ===
Pos	Player	Pld	W	L	FF	FA	FD	
1	Ricky Walden (ENG)	6	5	1	16	8	+8	Qualification to Group 3 play-off
2	Kyren Wilson (ENG)	6	4	2	14	11	+3	Qualification to Group 3 play-off
3	Mark Selby (ENG)	6	3	3	14	13	+1	Qualification to Group 3 play-off
4	Matthew Selt (ENG)	6	3	3	11	14	−3	Qualification to Group 3 play-off
5	Robert Milkins (ENG)	6	2	4	11	13	−2	Advances into Group 4
6	Jordan Brown (NIR)	6	2	4	11	14	−3	Eliminated from the competition
7	Jamie Jones (WAL)	6	2	4	10	14	−4	Eliminated from the competition

=== Play-offs ===
Semi-finals; Best of 5 frames
Ricky Walden (ENG)	2
Matthew Selt (ENG)	3
Kyren Wilson (ENG)	3
Mark Selby (ENG)	2

Final; Best of 5 frames
Matthew Selt (ENG)	2
Kyren Wilson (ENG)	3

== Group 4 ==
Group 4 was played on 5 and 6 January 2023. Zhao Xintong was due to enter the event in this group, but was withdrawn after being suspended by the WPBSA, and was replaced by Gary Wilson. Judd Trump won the group and qualified for the Winners' Group.

=== Matches ===
- Judd Trump 3–0 Ricky Walden
- Gary Wilson 2–3 Robert Milkins
- Judd Trump 3–0 Mark Selby
- John Higgins 3–1 Matthew Selt
- Gary Wilson 3–2 Ricky Walden
- Mark Selby 3–0 Matthew Selt
- Judd Trump 3–1 Gary Wilson
- John Higgins 3–2 Robert Milkins
- Mark Selby 3–1 Gary Wilson
- Ricky Walden 2–3 Robert Milkins
- Mark Selby 1–3 John Higgins
- Judd Trump 1–3 Matthew Selt
- John Higgins 1–3 Ricky Walden
- Robert Milkins 0–3 Matthew Selt
- John Higgins 3–0 Gary Wilson
- Mark Selby 1–3 Robert Milkins
- Gary Wilson 2–3 Matthew Selt
- Mark Selby 3–1 Ricky Walden
- Judd Trump 2–3 John Higgins
- Judd Trump 3–0 Robert Milkins
- Ricky Walden 3–0 Matthew Selt

=== Table ===
Pos	Player	Pld	W	L	FF	FA	FD	
1	John Higgins (SCO)	6	5	1	16	9	+7	Qualification to Group 4 play-off
2	Judd Trump (ENG)	6	4	2	15	7	+8	Qualification to Group 4 play-off
3	Mark Selby (ENG)	6	3	3	11	11	0	Qualification to Group 4 play-off
4	Robert Milkins (ENG)	6	3	3	11	14	−3	Qualification to Group 4 play-off
5	Matthew Selt (ENG)	6	3	3	10	12	−2	Advances into Group 5
6	Ricky Walden (ENG)	6	2	4	11	13	−2	Eliminated from the competition
7	Gary Wilson (ENG)	6	1	5	9	17	−8	Eliminated from the competition

=== Play-offs ===
Semi-finals; Best of 5 frames
John Higgins (SCO)	3
Robert Milkins (ENG)	1
Judd Trump (ENG)	3
Mark Selby (ENG)	2

Final; Best of 5 frames
John Higgins (SCO)	1
Judd Trump (ENG)	3

== Group 5 ==
Group 5 was played on 7 and 8 February 2023. Mark Selby withdrew from the tournament prior to group 5 play. Mark Williams was due to enter the event in this group, but also withdrew. The two players were replaced by Xiao Guodong and Noppon Saengkham. John Higgins won the group and qualified for the Winners' Group.

=== Matches ===
- Neil Robertson 3–0 Robert Milkins
- Davild Gilbert 0–3 Matthew Selt
- Neil Robertson 1–3 Xiao Guodong
- Noppon Saengkham 2–3 John Higgins
- David Gilbert 2–3 Robert Milkins
- Xiao Guodong 3–1 John Higgins
- Neil Robertson 3–0 David Gilbert
- Noppon Saengkham 1–3 Matthew Selt
- David Gilbert 3–2 Xiao Guodong
- Robert Milkins 0–3 Matthew Selt
- Noppon Saengkham 2–3 Xiao Guodong
- Neil Robertson 3–2 John Higgins
- Noppon Saengkham 0–3 Robert Milkins
- John Higgins 3–1 Matthew Selt
- Noppon Saengkham 3–1 David Gilbert
- Xiao Guodong 3 –0 Matthew Selt
- David Gilbert 3–1 John Higgins
- Xiao Guodong 1–3 Robert Milkins
- Neil Robertson 2–3 Matthew Selt
- Neil Robertson 1–3 Noppon Saengkham
- John Higgins 3–2 Robert Milkins

=== Table ===
Pos	Player	Pld	W	L	FF	FA	FD	
1	Xiao Guodong (CHN)	6	4	2	15	10	+5	Qualification to Group 5 play-off
2	Matthew Selt (ENG)	6	4	2	13	9	+4	Qualification to Group 5 play-off
3	Neil Robertson (AUS)	6	3	3	13	11	+2	Qualification to Group 5 play-off
4	John Higgins (SCO)	6	3	3	13	14	−1	Qualification to Group 5 play-off
5	Robert Milkins (ENG)	6	3	3	11	12	−1	Advances into Group 6
6	Noppon Saengkham (THA)	6	2	4	11	14	−3	Eliminated from the competition
7	David Gilbert (ENG)	6	2	4	9	15	−6	Eliminated from the competition

=== Play-offs ===
Semi-finals; Best of 5 frames
Xiao Guodong (CHN)	0
John Higgins (SCO)	3
Matthew Selt (ENG)	3
Neil Robertson (AUS)	2

Final; Best of 5 frames
John Higgins (SCO)	3
Matthew Selt (ENG)	1

== Group 6 ==
Group 6 was played on 9 and 10 February 2023. Luca Brecel was due to enter the event in this group but withdrew, and was replaced by Joe Perry. Neil Robertson won the group and qualified for the Winners' Group.

=== Matches ===
- Anthony McGill 3–0 Neil Robertson
- Zhou Yuelong 3–2 Xiao Guodong
- Joe Perry 0–3 Matthew Selt
- Anthony McGill 1–3 Xiao Guodong
- Zhou Yuelong 3–2 Robert Milkins
- Xiao Guodong 1–3 Matthew Selt
- Anthony McGill 3–0 Zhou Yuelong
- Joe Perry 3–2 Robert Milkins
- Anthony McGill 2–3 Matthew Selt
- Neil Robertson 2–3 Robert Milkins
- Joe Perry 0–3 Xiao Guodong
- Zhou Yuelong 3–2 Neil Robertson
- Joe Perry 2–3 Neil Robertson
- Robert Milkins 1–3 Matthew Selt
- Joe Perry 2–3 Zhou Yuelong
- Xiao Guodong 3–2 Robert Milkins
- Zhou Yuelong 0–3 Matthew Selt
- Xiao Guodong 2–3 Neil Robertson
- Anthony McGill 1–3 Joe Perry
- Anthony McGill 2–3 Robert Milkins
- Neil Robertson 3–1 Matthew Selt

=== Table ===
Pos	Player	Pld	W	L	FF	FA	FD	
1	Matthew Selt (ENG)	6	5	1	16	7	+9	Qualification to Group 6 play-off
2	Zhou Yuelong (CHN)	6	4	2	12	14	−2	Qualification to Group 6 play-off
3	Xiao Guodong (CHN)	6	3	3	14	12	+2	Qualification to Group 6 play-off
4	Neil Robertson (AUS)	6	3	3	13	14	−1	Qualification to Group 6 play-off
5	Robert Milkins (ENG)	6	2	4	13	16	−3	Advances into Group 7
6	Anthony McGill (SCO)	6	2	4	12	12	0	Eliminated from the competition
7	Joe Perry (ENG)	6	2	4	10	15	−5	Eliminated from the competition

=== Play-offs ===
Semi-finals; Best of 5 frames
Matthew Selt (ENG)	2
Neil Robertson (AUS)	3
Zhou Yuelong (CHN)	3
Xiao Guodong (CHN)	2

Final; Best of 5 frames
Neil Robertson (AUS)	3
Zhou Yuelong (CHN)	1

== Group 7 ==
Group 7 was played on 27 and 28 February 2023. Robert Milkins withdrew from the tournament prior to group 7 play. Ronnie O'Sullivan and Shaun Murphy were due to enter the event in this group, but both withdrew. The three players were replaced by Lyu Haotian, Stephen Maguire and Graeme Dott. Xiao Guodong won the group and qualified for the Winners' Group.

=== Matches ===
- Lyu Haotian 3–0 Matthew Selt
- Stephen Maguire 2–3 Graeme Dott
- Lyu Haotian 1–3 Xiao Guodong
- Tom Ford 3–1 Zhou Yuelong
- Stephen Maguire 3–1 Matthew Selt
- Xiao Guodong 2–3 Zhou Yuelong
- Lyu Haotian 1–3 Stephen Maguire
- Tom Ford 2–3 Graeme Dott
- Stephen Maguire 3–1 Xiao Guodong
- Matthew Selt 0–3 Graeme Dott
- Tom Ford 2–3 Xiao Guodong
- Lyu Haotian 3–2 Zhou Yuelong
- Tom Ford 0–3 Matthew Selt
- Graeme Dott 3–2 Zhou Yuelong
- Tom Ford 3–2 Stephen Maguire
- Xiao Guodong 1–3 Graeme Dott
- Stephen Maguire 3–1 Zhou Yuelong
- Xiao Guodong 3–1 Matthew Selt
- Lyu Haotian 3–1 Tom Ford
- Lyu Haotian 3–1 Graeme Dott
- Matthew Selt 0–3 Zhou Yuelong

=== Table ===
Pos	Player	Pld	W	L	FF	FA	FD	
1	Graeme Dott (SCO)	6	5	1	16	10	+6	Qualification to Group 7 play-off
2	Stephen Maguire (SCO)	6	4	2	16	10	+6	Qualification to Group 7 play-off
3	Lyu Haotian (CHN)	6	4	2	14	10	+4	Qualification to Group 7 play-off
4	Xiao Guodong (CHN)	6	3	3	13	13	0	Qualification to Group 7 play-off
5	Zhou Yuelong (CHN)	6	2	4	12	14	−2	Eliminated from the competition
6	Tom Ford (ENG)	6	2	4	11	15	−4	Eliminated from the competition
7	Matthew Selt (ENG)	6	1	5	5	15	−10	Eliminated from the competition

=== Play-offs ===
Semi-finals; Best of 5 frames
Graeme Dott (SCO)	1
Xiao Guodong (CHN)	3
Stephen Maguire (SCO)	0
Lyu Haotian (CHN)	3

Final; Best of 5 frames
Xiao Guodong (CHN)	3
Lyu Haotian (CHN)	2

== Winners' Group ==
The Winners' Group was played on 1 and 2 March 2023. John Higgins won the Championship League for a fourth time, beating Judd Trump 3–1 in the final.

=== Matches ===
- Neil Robertson 2–3 Stuart Bingham
- John Higgins 0–3 Kyren Wilson
- Neil Robertson 3–1 Jack Lisowski
- Judd Trump 3–1 Xiao Guodong
- John Higgins 3–2 Stuart Bingham
- Jack Lisowski 3–1 Xiao Guodong
- Neil Robertson 3–2 John Higgins
- Judd Trump 3–1 Kyren Wilson
- John Higgins 3–1 Jack Lisowski
- Kyren Wilson 3–1 Stuart Bingham
- Judd Trump 3–1 Jack Lisowski
- Neil Robertson 0–3 Xiao Guodong
- Judd Trump 3–1 Stuart Bingham
- Kyren Wilson 3–1 Xiao Guodong
- Judd Trump 2–3 John Higgins
- Kyren Wilson 3–2 Jack Lisowski
- John Higgins 3–1 Xiao Guodong
- Jack Lisowski 3–1 Stuart Bingham
- Neil Robertson 0–3 Judd Trump
- Neil Robertson 3–2 Kyren Wilson
- Stuart Bingham 3–2 Xiao Guodong

=== Table ===
Pos	Player	Pld	W	L	FF	FA	FD	
1	Judd Trump (ENG)	6	5	1	17	7	+10	Qualification to Winners' Group play-off
2	Kyren Wilson (ENG)	6	4	2	15	10	+5	Qualification to Winners' Group play-off
3	John Higgins (SCO)	6	4	2	14	12	+2	Qualification to Winners' Group play-off
4	Neil Robertson (AUS)	6	3	3	11	14	−3	Qualification to Winners' Group play-off
5	Jack Lisowski (ENG)	6	2	4	11	14	−3	Eliminated from the competition
6	Stuart Bingham (ENG)	6	2	4	11	16	−5	Eliminated from the competition
7	Xiao Guodong (CHN)	6	1	5	9	15	−6	Eliminated from the competition

=== Play-offs ===
Semi-finals; Best of 5 frames
Judd Trump (ENG)	3
Neil Robertson (AUS)	0
Kyren Wilson (ENG)	2
John Higgins (SCO)	3

Final; Best of 5 frames
Judd Trump (ENG)	1
John Higgins (SCO)	3

== Century breaks ==
A total of 159 century breaks were made during the tournament.

- **144** (W), **141** (4), 141, 137, 135, 126, 121, 116, 115, 108, 107, 102, 100, 100 – John Higgins
- **143** (5), 139, 130, 122, 118, 114, 111, 108, 107, 101 – Neil Robertson
- **143** (5), 109, 103, 100, 100 – Robert Milkins
- **143** (1), 105, 100 – Jimmy Robertson
- **142** (2), 140, 139, 138, 132, 130, 120, 118, 112, 109, 108, 104, 103, 100 – Stuart Bingham
- 142, 135, 119, 115, 111, 101 – Jack Lisowski
- 141, **138** (6), 138, 133, 130, 128, 127, 127, 127, 126, 123, 117, 111, 110, 110, 108, 107, 106, 106, 103, 102, 101, 101 – Matthew Selt
- **140** (7), 106 – Graeme Dott
- 138, 134, 131, 124 – Gary Wilson
- 137, **133** (3), 129, 112, 105, 104, 104, 103, 101 – Kyren Wilson
- 137, 114 – Ali Carter
- 136, 132, 112 – Jordan Brown
- 136, 122 – Tom Ford
- 135, 119, 103 – Noppon Saengkham
- 135, 115 – David Gilbert
- 134, 108 – Joe Perry
- 131, 131, 124, 122, 118, 117, 113, 112, 111, 111, 110, 110, 109, 106, 105, 102 – Xiao Guodong
- 130, 112, 107, 107, 104 – Ricky Walden
- 130, 128, 116, 106, 100, 100 – Lyu Haotian
- 129, 122, 116, 108, 108, 108, 104, 102, 100, 100 – Judd Trump
- 128, 120, 117 – Jamie Jones
- 124, 121, 118 – Mark Selby
- 124 – Stephen Maguire
- 123, 112 – Anthony McGill
- 118, 113, 109 – Zhou Yuelong
- 115, 105, 105, 100, 100, 100 – Ryan Day

Bold: highest break in the indicated group.

== Winnings ==
No.	Player	1	2	3	4	5	6	7	W	TOTAL
1	John Higgins (SCO) (6)				**5,300**	6,100			**15,600**	27,000
2	Matthew Selt (ENG) (28)	4,400	3,200	4,600	1,000	4,500	**3,700**	500		21,900
3	Judd Trump (ENG) (4)				6,300				9,600	15,900
4	Neil Robertson (AUS) (3)					**3,150**	6,100		5,200	14,450
5	Xiao Guodong (CHN) (34)					2,500	3,000	6,100	1,800	13,400
6	Kyren Wilson (ENG) (8)			**6,700**					6,600	13,300
7	Robert Milkins (ENG)^{(b)} (31)		4,700	1,100	2,400	**1,350**	1,300			10,850
8	Stuart Bingham (ENG) (14)	1,200	**6,400**						2,200	9,800
9	Jack Lisowski (ENG) (12)	6,000							2,200	8,200
10	Jordan Brown (NIR) (25)	3,100	2,900	1,100						7,100
11	Mark Selby (ENG)^{(a)} (2)			3,000	2,700					5,700
12	Zhou Yuelong (CHN) (27)						4,400	1,200		5,600
13	Lyu Haotian (CHN) (37)							4,900		4,900
14	Ryan Day (WAL) (15)	3,200	1,100							4,300
=	Ricky Walden (ENG) (20)			3,200	1,100					4,300
16	Graeme Dott (SCO) (38)							**3,400**		3,400
17	Stephen Maguire (SCO) (29)							2,600		2,600
18	Jamie Jones (WAL) (32)		900	1,000						1,900
19	Jimmy Robertson (ENG) (26)	**1,500**								1,500
20	Anthony McGill (SCO) (21)						1,200			1,200
21	Ali Carter (ENG) (23)	1,100								1,100
=	Noppon Saengkham (THA) (33)					1,100				1,100
=	Tom Ford (ENG) (24)							1,100		1,100
24	Joe Perry (ENG) (30)						1,000			1,000
25	Gary Wilson (ENG) (17)				900					900
=	David Gilbert (ENG) (18)					900				900
27	Barry Hawkins (ENG) (13)		800							800
	Total prize money	20,500	20,000	20,700	19,700	19,600	20,700	19,800	43,200	184,200

Green: Won the group. Bold: Highest break in the group. All prize money in GBP.
Parenthesis: Ranking prior to tournament start, 19 December 2022.
Notes
^{(a)} Mark Selby withdrew from the tournament prior to group 5 play.
^{(b)} Robert Milkins withdrew from the tournament prior to group 7 play.
