= 2019 Championship League =

Championship League
Tournament information
- Dates: 1 January – 14 March 2019
- Venue: Ricoh Arena and Barnsley Metrodome
- City: Coventry and Barnsley
- Country: England
- Format: Non-ranking event
- Total prize fund: £177,800
- Winner's share: £10,000 (plus bonuses)
- Highest break: David Gilbert (ENG) (147)

Final
- Champion: Martin Gould (ENG)
- Runner-up: Jack Lisowski (ENG)
- Score: 3–1

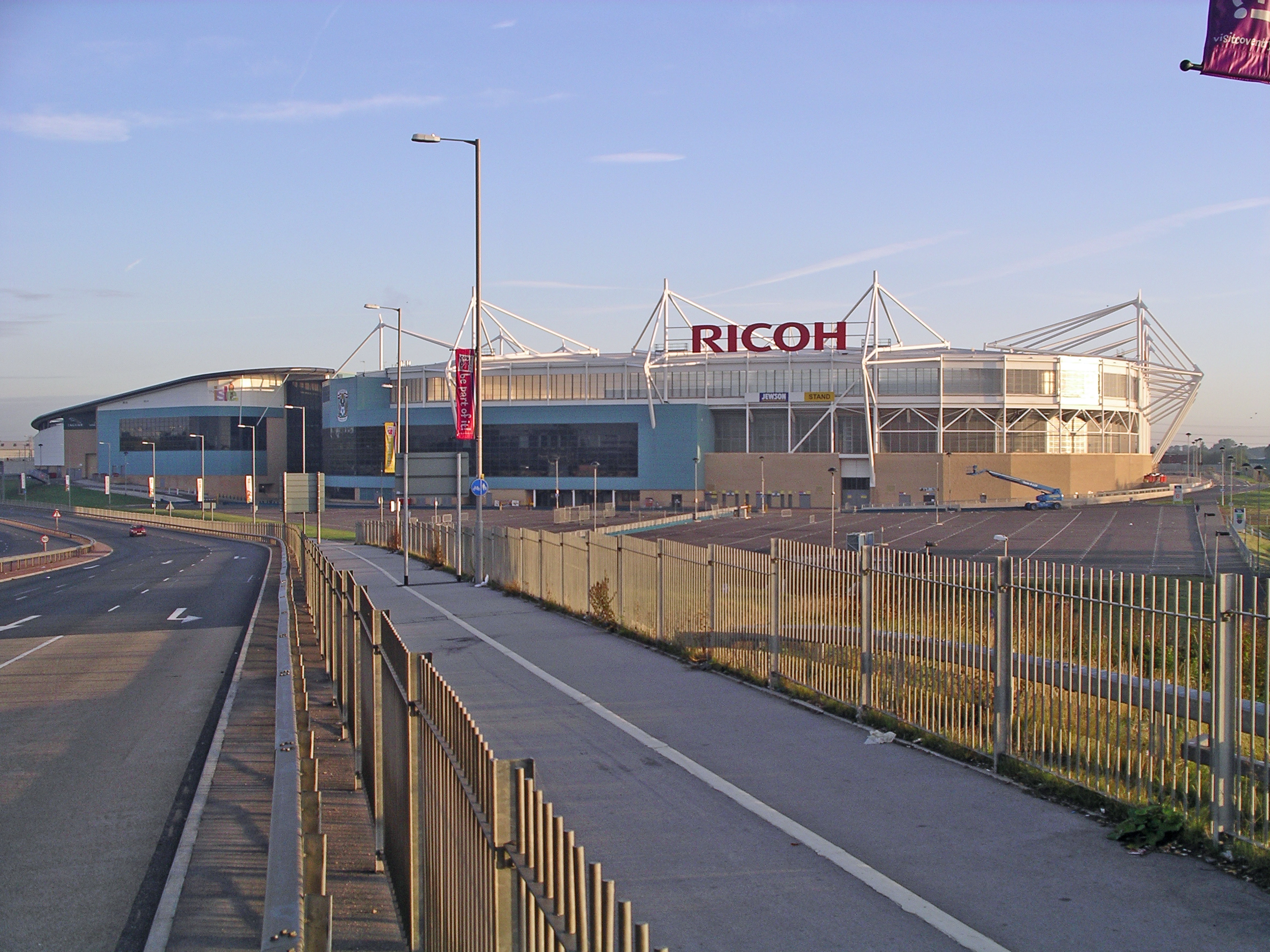
Ricoh Arena (Coventry)

The 2019 Championship League was a professional non-ranking snooker tournament, taking place from 1 January to 14 March 2019 at the Ricoh Arena in Coventry (Group 1–6) and at the Barnsley Metrodome in Barnsley (Group 7 and the Winners' Group), both in England. It was the 12th staging of the tournament.

David Gilbert made the historic 147th maximum break in his group 5 round robin match against Stephen Maguire. It was Gilbert's second professional maximum break (he achieved his first in the 2015 Championship League), and it was the sixth consecutive year that a maximum was made in the Championship League.

During the round robin matches, Neil Robertson recorded his 600th career century in Group 1, and Ding Junhui his 500th in Group 7. And during the Winners' Group round robin matches, John Higgins made his 750th career century break, and Judd Trump also recorded his 600th.

John Higgins was a two-time defending champion, having retained his 2017 title with a 3–2 victory against Zhou Yuelong in the 2018 final. However, Higgins lost 3–0 to Martin Gould in the semi-finals.

Martin Gould went on to win his second Championship League title, beating Jack Lisowski 3–1 in the final.

== Tournament Format ==
The Championship League event sees 25 professionals (including substitutes; 28 players in 2019) take part, with players earning prize money for every frame won. Matches are best of 5 frames, and the league is played from January to March 2019.

The competition runs over eight groups, each consisting of seven players. From each group the top four qualify for a play-off, and the winners of the first seven play-offs qualify for the winners group. The bottom two players of each group are eliminated and the remaining four move to the next group, where they are joined by three more players until the seventh group. The winners play in the final group, and the winner of the Winners' Group play-off takes the title and a place at the 2019 Champion of Champions.

=== Prize fund ===
The breakdown of prize money for the 2019 Championship League is shown below.

Group 1–7

- Winner: £3,000
- Runner-up: £2,000
- Semi-final: £1,000
- Frame-win (league stage): £100
- Frame-win (play-offs): £300
- Highest break: £500

Winners' Group

- Winner: £10,000
- Runner-up: £5,000
- Semi-final: £3,000
- Frame-win (league stage): £200
- Frame-win (play-offs): £300
- Highest break: £1,000
- Tournament total: £177,800

== Group 1 ==
Group 1 was played on 1 and 2 January 2019. Neil Robertson was the first player to qualify for the Winners' Group, recording his 600th career century in the round-robin match against Anthony Hamilton.

=== Matches ===
- Neil Robertson 3–1 Jack Lisowski
- Jimmy Robertson 0–3 Robert Milkins
- Anthony Hamilton 3–2 Neil Robertson
- Mark King 3–1 Ricky Walden
- Jack Lisowski 1–3 Jimmy Robertson
- Robert Milkins 2–3 Mark King
- Ricky Walden 3–1 Anthony Hamilton
- Neil Robertson 3–1 Jimmy Robertson
- Jack Lisowski 3–2 Robert Milkins
- Mark King 3–0 Anthony Hamilton
- Ricky Walden 3–0 Robert Milkins
- Jimmy Robertson 1–3 Anthony Hamilton
- Neil Robertson 1–3 Ricky Walden
- Jack Lisowski 3–1 Mark King
- Jimmy Robertson 3–0 Ricky Walden
- Robert Milkins 1–3 Anthony Hamilton
- Neil Robertson 3–0 Mark King
- Jack Lisowski 3–2 Anthony Hamilton
- Jimmy Robertson 3–1 Mark King
- Jack Lisowski 3–2 Ricky Walden
- Neil Robertson 3–1 Robert Milkins

=== Table ===
| Pos | Player | Pld | W | L | FF | FA | FD | |
|---|---|---|---|---|---|---|---|---|
| 1 | Neil Robertson (AUS) | 6 | 4 | 2 | 15 | 9 | +6 | Qualification to Group 1 play-off |
| 2 | Jack Lisowski (ENG) | 6 | 4 | 2 | 14 | 13 | +1 | Qualification to Group 1 play-off |
| 3 | Ricky Walden (ENG) | 6 | 3 | 3 | 12 | 11 | +1 | Qualification to Group 1 play-off |
| 4 | Anthony Hamilton (ENG) | 6 | 3 | 3 | 12 | 13 | −1 | Qualification to Group 1 play-off |
| 5 | Jimmy Robertson (ENG) | 6 | 3 | 3 | 11 | 11 | 0 | Advances into Group 2 |
| 6 | Mark King (ENG) | 6 | 3 | 3 | 11 | 12 | −1 | Eliminated from the competition |
| 7 | Robert Milkins (ENG) | 6 | 1 | 5 | 9 | 15 | −6 | Eliminated from the competition |

Source: Championship League Snooker by Matchroom Sport

=== Play-offs ===
Semi-finals; Best of 5 frames
Neil Robertson (AUS) | 3
Anthony Hamilton (ENG) | 0
Jack Lisowski (ENG) | 3
Ricky Walden (ENG) | 1

Final; Best of 5 frames
Neil Robertson (AUS) | 3
Jack Lisowski (ENG) | 0

== Group 2 ==
Group 2 was played on 3 and 4 January 2019. Jack Lisowski was the second player to qualify for the Winners' Group.

=== Matches ===
- Judd Trump 3–0 Kyren Wilson
- Luca Brecel 3–2 Jimmy Robertson
- Anthony Hamilton 3–0 Judd Trump
- Ricky Walden 2–3 Jack Lisowski
- Kyren Wilson 3–0 Luca Brecel
- Jimmy Robertson 1–3 Ricky Walden
- Jack Lisowski 3–2 Anthony Hamilton
- Judd Trump 1–3 Luca Brecel
- Kyren Wilson 2–3 Jimmy Robertson
- Ricky Walden 3–1 Anthony Hamilton
- Jack Lisowski 1–3 Jimmy Robertson
- Luca Brecel 3–1 Anthony Hamilton
- Judd Trump 1–3 Jack Lisowski
- Kyren Wilson 3–2 Ricky Walden
- Luca Brecel 0–3 Jack Lisowski
- Jimmy Robertson 3–2 Anthony Hamilton
- Judd Trump 3–2 Ricky Walden
- Kyren Wilson 3–1 Anthony Hamilton
- Luca Brecel 3–0 Ricky Walden
- Kyren Wilson 2–3 Jack Lisowski
- Judd Trump 3–1 Jimmy Robertson

=== Table ===
| Pos | Player | Pld | W | L | FF | FA | FD | |
|---|---|---|---|---|---|---|---|---|
| 1 | Jack Lisowski (ENG) | 6 | 5 | 1 | 16 | 10 | +6 | Qualification to Group 2 play-off |
| 2 | Luca Brecel (BEL) | 6 | 4 | 2 | 12 | 10 | +2 | Qualification to Group 2 play-off |
| 3 | Kyren Wilson (ENG) | 6 | 3 | 3 | 13 | 12 | +1 | Qualification to Group 2 play-off |
| 4 | Jimmy Robertson (ENG) | 6 | 3 | 3 | 13 | 14 | −1 | Qualification to Group 2 play-off |
| 5 | Judd Trump (ENG) | 6 | 3 | 3 | 11 | 12 | −1 | Advances into Group 3 |
| 6 | Ricky Walden (ENG) | 6 | 2 | 4 | 12 | 14 | −2 | Eliminated from the competition |
| 7 | Anthony Hamilton (ENG) | 6 | 1 | 5 | 10 | 15 | −5 | Eliminated from the competition |

Source: Championship League Snooker by Matchroom Sport

=== Play-offs ===
Semi-finals; Best of 5 frames
Jack Lisowski (ENG) | 3
Jimmy Robertson (ENG) | 2
Luca Brecel (BEL) | 3
Kyren Wilson (ENG) | 2

Final; Best of 5 frames
Jack Lisowski (ENG) | 3
Luca Brecel (BEL) | 0

== Group 3 ==
Group 3 was played on 7 and 8 January 2019. Judd Trump was the third player to qualify for the Winners' Group.

=== Matches ===
- Mark Selby 0–3 Barry Hawkins
- Stuart Bingham 2–3 Judd Trump
- Jimmy Robertson 2–3 Mark Selby
- Kyren Wilson 2–3 Luca Brecel
- Barry Hawkins 3–2 Stuart Bingham
- Judd Trump 3–1 Kyren Wilson
- Luca Brecel 3–0 Jimmy Robertson
- Mark Selby 2–3 Stuart Bingham
- Barry Hawkins 3–1 Judd Trump
- Kyren Wilson 3–0 Jimmy Robertson
- Luca Brecel 3–2 Judd Trump
- Stuart Bingham 3–1 Jimmy Robertson
- Mark Selby 3–1 Luca Brecel
- Barry Hawkins 0–3 Kyren Wilson
- Stuart Bingham 3–1 Luca Brecel
- Judd Trump 3–1 Jimmy Robertson
- Mark Selby 3–1 Kyren Wilson
- Barry Hawkins 2–3 Jimmy Robertson
- Stuart Bingham 3–0 Kyren Wilson
- Barry Hawkins 3–0 Luca Brecel
- Mark Selby 3–1 Judd Trump

=== Table ===
| Pos | Player | Pld | W | L | FF | FA | FD | |
|---|---|---|---|---|---|---|---|---|
| 1 | Stuart Bingham (ENG) | 6 | 4 | 2 | 16 | 10 | +6 | Qualification to Group 3 play-off |
| 2 | Barry Hawkins (ENG) | 6 | 4 | 2 | 14 | 9 | +5 | Qualification to Group 3 play-off |
| 3 | Mark Selby (ENG) | 6 | 4 | 2 | 14 | 11 | +3 | Qualification to Group 3 play-off |
| 4 | Judd Trump (ENG) | 6 | 3 | 3 | 13 | 13 | 0 | Qualification to Group 3 play-off |
| 5 | Luca Brecel (BEL) | 6 | 3 | 3 | 11 | 13 | −2 | Advances into Group 4 |
| 6 | Kyren Wilson (ENG) | 6 | 2 | 4 | 10 | 12 | −2 | Eliminated from the competition |
| 7 | Jimmy Robertson (ENG) | 6 | 1 | 5 | 7 | 17 | −10 | Eliminated from the competition |

Source: Championship League Snooker by Matchroom Sport

=== Play-offs ===
Semi-finals; Best of 5 frames
Stuart Bingham (ENG) | 2
Judd Trump (ENG) | 3
Barry Hawkins (ENG) | 3
Mark Selby (ENG) | 2

Final; Best of 5 frames
Judd Trump (ENG) | 3
Barry Hawkins (ENG) | 0

== Group 4 ==
Group 4 was played on 9 and 10 January 2019. Stuart Bingham was the fourth player to qualify for the Winners' Group.

=== Matches ===
- Ryan Day 1–3 Ali Carter
- Graeme Dott 3–1 Luca Brecel
- Stuart Bingham 3–1 Ryan Day
- Mark Selby 3–1 Barry Hawkins
- Ali Carter 3–1 Graeme Dott
- Luca Brecel 0–3 Mark Selby
- Barry Hawkins 3–0 Stuart Bingham
- Ryan Day 3–2 Graeme Dott
- Ali Carter 1–3 Luca Brecel
- Mark Selby 3–2 Stuart Bingham
- Barry Hawkins 1–3 Luca Brecel
- Graeme Dott 3–2 Stuart Bingham
- Ryan Day 3–0 Barry Hawkins
- Ali Carter 3–1 Mark Selby
- Graeme Dott 1–3 Barry Hawkins
- Luca Brecel 0–3 Stuart Bingham
- Ryan Day 1–3 Mark Selby
- Ali Carter 1–3 Stuart Bingham
- Graeme Dott 0–3 Mark Selby
- Ali Carter 0–3 Barry Hawkins
- Ryan Day 2–3 Luca Brecel

=== Table ===
| Pos | Player | Pld | W | L | FF | FA | FD | |
|---|---|---|---|---|---|---|---|---|
| 1 | Mark Selby (ENG) | 6 | 5 | 1 | 16 | 7 | +9 | Qualification to Group 4 play-off |
| 2 | Stuart Bingham (ENG) | 6 | 3 | 3 | 13 | 11 | +2 | Qualification to Group 4 play-off |
| 3 | Barry Hawkins (ENG) | 6 | 3 | 3 | 11 | 10 | +1 | Qualification to Group 4 play-off |
| 4 | Ali Carter (ENG) | 6 | 3 | 3 | 11 | 12 | −1 | Qualification to Group 4 play-off |
| 5 | Luca Brecel (BEL) | 6 | 3 | 3 | 10 | 13 | −3 | Advances into Group 5 |
| 6 | Ryan Day (WAL) | 6 | 2 | 4 | 11 | 14 | −3 | Eliminated from the competition |
| 7 | Graeme Dott (SCO) | 6 | 2 | 4 | 10 | 15 | −5 | Eliminated from the competition |

Source: Championship League Snooker by Matchroom Sport

=== Play-offs ===
Semi-finals; Best of 5 frames
Mark Selby (ENG) | 3
Ali Carter (ENG) | 1
Stuart Bingham (ENG) | 3
Barry Hawkins (ENG) | 1

Final; Best of 5 frames
Mark Selby (ENG) | 1
Stuart Bingham (ENG) | 3

== Group 5 ==
Group 5 was played on 21 and 22 January 2019. Mark Selby was the fifth player to qualify for the Winners' Group.

=== Matches ===
- Stephen Maguire 3–0 Anthony McGill
- Joe Perry 2–3 David Gilbert
- Ali Carter 1–3 Stephen Maguire
- Barry Hawkins 3–0 Mark Selby
- Anthony McGill 3–2 Joe Perry
- David Gilbert 3–1 Barry Hawkins
- Mark Selby 3–0 Ali Carter
- Stephen Maguire 0–3 Joe Perry
- Anthony McGill 1–3 David Gilbert
- Barry Hawkins 1–3 Ali Carter
- Mark Selby 2–3 David Gilbert
- Joe Perry 1–3 Ali Carter
- Stephen Maguire 3–2 Mark Selby
- Anthony McGill 3–1 Barry Hawkins
- Joe Perry 0–3 Mark Selby
- David Gilbert 3–1 Ali Carter
- Stephen Maguire 2–3 Barry Hawkins
- Anthony McGill 2–3 Ali Carter
- Joe Perry 1–3 Barry Hawkins
- Anthony McGill 1–3 Mark Selby
- Stephen Maguire 3–1 David Gilbert

Note

Due to illness, Luca Brecel withdrew from the tournament prior to group 5 play. He was replaced in the group by David Gilbert.

=== Table ===
| Pos | Player | Pld | W | L | FF | FA | FD | |
|---|---|---|---|---|---|---|---|---|
| 1 | David Gilbert (ENG) | 6 | 5 | 1 | 16 | 10 | +6 | Qualification to Group 5 play-off |
| 2 | Stephen Maguire (SCO) | 6 | 4 | 2 | 14 | 10 | +4 | Qualification to Group 5 play-off |
| 3 | Mark Selby (ENG) | 6 | 3 | 3 | 13 | 10 | +3 | Qualification to Group 5 play-off |
| 4 | Barry Hawkins (ENG) | 6 | 3 | 3 | 12 | 12 | 0 | Qualification to Group 5 play-off |
| 5 | Ali Carter (ENG) | 6 | 3 | 3 | 11 | 13 | −2 | Advances into Group 6 |
| 6 | Anthony McGill (SCO) | 6 | 2 | 4 | 10 | 15 | −5 | Eliminated from the competition |
| 7 | Joe Perry (ENG) | 6 | 1 | 5 | 9 | 15 | −6 | Eliminated from the competition |

Source: Championship League Snooker by Matchroom Sport

=== Play-offs ===
Semi-finals; Best of 5 frames
David Gilbert (ENG) | 0
Barry Hawkins (ENG) | 3
Stephen Maguire (SCO) | 2
Mark Selby (ENG) | 3

Final; Best of 5 frames
Barry Hawkins (ENG) | 0
Mark Selby (ENG) | 3

== Group 6 ==
Group 6 was played on 23 and 24 January 2019. Martin Gould was the sixth player to qualify for the Winners' Group.

=== Matches ===
- Xiao Guodong 0–3 Martin Gould
- Mark Davis 3–0 Ali Carter
- David Gilbert 3–0 Xiao Guodong
- Stephen Maguire 3–1 Barry Hawkins
- Martin Gould 1–3 Mark Davis
- Ali Carter 2–3 Stephen Maguire
- Barry Hawkins 3–1 David Gilbert
- Xiao Guodong 2–3 Mark Davis
- Martin Gould 3–2 Ali Carter
- Stephen Maguire 3–2 David Gilbert
- Barry Hawkins 3–1 Ali Carter
- Mark Davis 1–3 David Gilbert
- Xiao Guodong 1–3 Barry Hawkins
- Martin Gould 3–0 Stephen Maguire
- Mark Davis 1–3 Barry Hawkins
- Ali Carter 3–2 David Gilbert
- Xiao Guodong 3–0 Stephen Maguire
- Martin Gould 3–0 David Gilbert
- Mark Davis 3–2 Stephen Maguire
- Martin Gould 0–3 Barry Hawkins
- Xiao Guodong 0–3 Ali Carter

=== Table ===
| Pos | Player | Pld | W | L | FF | FA | FD | |
|---|---|---|---|---|---|---|---|---|
| 1 | Barry Hawkins (ENG) | 6 | 5 | 1 | 16 | 7 | +9 | Qualification to Group 6 play-off |
| 2 | Mark Davis (ENG) | 6 | 4 | 2 | 14 | 11 | +3 | Qualification to Group 6 play-off |
| 3 | Martin Gould (ENG) | 6 | 4 | 2 | 13 | 8 | +5 | Qualification to Group 6 play-off |
| 4 | Stephen Maguire (SCO) | 6 | 3 | 3 | 11 | 14 | −3 | Qualification to Group 6 play-off |
| 5 | David Gilbert (ENG) | 6 | 2 | 4 | 11 | 13 | −2 | Advances into Group 7 |
| 6 | Ali Carter (ENG) | 6 | 2 | 4 | 11 | 14 | −3 | Eliminated from the competition |
| 7 | Xiao Guodong (CHN) | 6 | 1 | 5 | 6 | 15 | −9 | Eliminated from the competition |

Source: Championship League Snooker by Matchroom Sport

=== Play-offs ===
Semi-finals; Best of 5 frames
Barry Hawkins (ENG) | 3
Stephen Maguire (SCO) | 1
Mark Davis (ENG) | 1
Martin Gould (ENG) | 3

Final; Best of 5 frames
Barry Hawkins (ENG) | 2
Martin Gould (ENG) | 3

== Group 7 ==
Group 7 was played on 11 and 12 March 2019. John Higgins was the seventh and final player to qualify for the Winners' Group.

=== Matches ===
- John Higgins 3–0 Ding Junhui
- Michael White 0–3 Noppon Saengkham
- Stephen Maguire 0–3 John Higgins
- Mark Davis 3–2 Tom Ford
- Ding Junhui 3–2 Michael White
- Noppon Saengkham 3–1 Mark Davis
- Tom Ford 1–3 Stephen Maguire
- John Higgins 3–1 Michael White
- Ding Junhui 0–3 Noppon Saengkham
- Mark Davis 3–2 Stephen Maguire
- Tom Ford 2–3 Noppon Saengkham
- Michael White 2–3 Stephen Maguire
- John Higgins 3–0 Tom Ford
- Ding Junhui 3–1 Mark Davis
- Michael White 1–3 Tom Ford
- Noppon Saengkham 3–2 Stephen Maguire
- John Higgins 3–0 Mark Davis
- Ding Junhui 3–1 Stephen Maguire
- Michael White 3–1 Mark Davis
- Ding Junhui 3–1 Tom Ford
- John Higgins 3–1 Noppon Saengkham

Note

David Gilbert and Barry Hawkins withdrew from the tournament prior to group 7 play. They were replaced by Tom Ford and Noppon Saengkham.

=== Table ===
| Pos | Player | Pld | W | L | FF | FA | FD | |
|---|---|---|---|---|---|---|---|---|
| 1 | John Higgins (SCO) | 6 | 6 | 0 | 18 | 2 | +16 | Qualification to Group 7 play-off |
| 2 | Noppon Saengkham (THA) | 6 | 5 | 1 | 16 | 8 | +8 | Qualification to Group 7 play-off |
| 3 | Ding Junhui (CHN) | 6 | 4 | 2 | 12 | 11 | +1 | Qualification to Group 7 play-off |
| 4 | Stephen Maguire (SCO) | 6 | 2 | 4 | 11 | 15 | −4 | Qualification to Group 7 play-off |
| 5 | Mark Davis (ENG) | 6 | 2 | 4 | 9 | 16 | −7 | Eliminated from the competition |
| 6 | Tom Ford (ENG) | 6 | 1 | 5 | 9 | 16 | −7 | Eliminated from the competition |
| 7 | Michael White (WAL) | 6 | 1 | 5 | 9 | 16 | −7 | Eliminated from the competition |

Source: Championship League Snooker by Matchroom Sport

=== Play-offs ===
Semi-finals; Best of 5 frames
John Higgins (SCO) | 3
Stephen Maguire (SCO) | 1
Noppon Saengkham (THA) | 2
Ding Junhui (CHN) | 3

Final; Best of 5 frames
John Higgins (SCO) | 3
Ding Junhui (CHN) | 0

== Winners' Group ==
The Winners' Group was played on 13 and 14 March 2019. Martin Gould won his second Championship League title, beating Jack Lisowski 3–1 in the final. During the round robin matches, John Higgins made his 750th career century break. On the second day, Judd Trump made his 600th career century in his match against Martin Gould.

=== Matches ===
- Neil Robertson 3–1 Jack Lisowski
- Judd Trump 3–1 Stuart Bingham
- Martin Gould 3–2 John Higgins
- Mark Selby 1–3 Neil Robertson
- Jack Lisowski 3–1 Judd Trump
- Stuart Bingham 1–3 Martin Gould
- John Higgins 3–2 Mark Selby
- Neil Robertson 1–3 Judd Trump
- Jack Lisowski 3–1 Stuart Bingham
- Martin Gould 0–3 Mark Selby
- John Higgins 1–3 Stuart Bingham
- Judd Trump 1–3 Mark Selby
- Neil Robertson 3–1 John Higgins
- Jack Lisowski 0–3 Martin Gould
- Judd Trump 0–3 John Higgins
- Stuart Bingham 1–3 Mark Selby
- Neil Robertson 0–3 Martin Gould
- Jack Lisowski 3–0 Mark Selby
- Judd Trump 3–0 Martin Gould
- Jack Lisowski 2–3 John Higgins
- Neil Robertson 3–1 Stuart Bingham

=== Table ===
| Pos | Player | Pld | W | L | FF | FA | FD | |
|---|---|---|---|---|---|---|---|---|
| 1 | Neil Robertson (AUS) | 6 | 4 | 2 | 13 | 10 | +3 | Qualification to Winners' Group play-off |
| 2 | Martin Gould (ENG) | 6 | 4 | 2 | 12 | 9 | +3 | Qualification to Winners' Group play-off |
| 3 | John Higgins (SCO) | 6 | 3 | 3 | 13 | 13 | 0 | Qualification to Winners' Group play-off |
| 4 | Jack Lisowski (ENG) | 6 | 3 | 3 | 12 | 11 | +1 | Qualification to Winners' Group play-off |
| 5 | Mark Selby (ENG) | 6 | 3 | 3 | 12 | 11 | +1 | Eliminated from the competition |
| 6 | Judd Trump (ENG) | 6 | 3 | 3 | 11 | 11 | 0 | Eliminated from the competition |
| 7 | Stuart Bingham (ENG) | 6 | 1 | 5 | 8 | 16 | −8 | Eliminated from the competition |

Source: Championship League Snooker by Matchroom Sport

=== Play-offs ===
Semi-finals; Best of 5 frames
Neil Robertson (AUS) | 0
Jack Lisowski (ENG) | 3
Martin Gould (ENG) | 3
John Higgins (SCO) | 0

Final; Best of 5 frames
Jack Lisowski (ENG) | 1
Martin Gould (ENG) | 3

== Century breaks ==
Total: 104

- **147** (5), 105, 100, 100 – David Gilbert
- **143** (3), **143** (4), 143, 141, 139, 139, 135, 122, 113, 113, 110, 109, 107, 103, 102, 100 – Mark Selby
- **143** (3), 132, 111, 106, 101, 100 – Stuart Bingham
- 142, 137, **136** (W), 127, 125, 115, 111, 110, 109, 105, 105, 104, 103 – Judd Trump
- **141** (6), 134, 126, 125, 113, 105 – Ali Carter
- **139** (1), 128, 124, 120, 115, 110, 104 – Neil Robertson
- 135, 131, 117, 115, 105, 105 – Martin Gould
- 135, 129, 124, 116, 108, 105, 104, 103, 102 – Stephen Maguire
- 135, 127, 104, 102 – Luca Brecel
- 135 – Joe Perry
- 135 – Ricky Walden
- 134, 121, 120, 120, 105, 105, 101, 101 – Barry Hawkins
- **132** (2), 129, 123, 108 – Kyren Wilson
- **130** (7), 120, 118, 117, 117 – John Higgins
- 127 – Tom Ford
- 122 – Graeme Dott
- 121, 100 – Ding Junhui
- 120, 117 – Jimmy Robertson
- 117, 107, 103 – Jack Lisowski
- 112, 110 – Noppon Saengkham
- 112 – Xiao Guodong
- 110 – Michael White
- 104 – Anthony McGill

Bold: highest break in the indicated group.

== Winnings ==
| No. | Player | 1 | 2 | 3 | 4 | 5 | 6 | 7 | W | TOTAL |
|---|---|---|---|---|---|---|---|---|---|---|
| 1 | Martin Gould (ENG) (27) | | | | | | 6,100 | | 14,200 | 20,300 |
| 2 | Jack Lisowski (ENG) (16) | 4,300 | 6,400 | | | | | | 8,600 | 19,300 |
| 3 | Mark Selby (ENG) (1) | | | **3,250** | **5,300** | 6,100 | | | 2,400 | 17,050 |
| 4 | John Higgins (SCO) (4) | | | | | | | **7,100** | 5,600 | 12,700 |
| 5 | Neil Robertson (AUS) (10) | **6,800** | | | | | | | 5,600 | 12,400 |
| 6 | Barry Hawkins (ENG)^{(2)} (7) | | | 4,300 | 2,400 | 4,100 | 5,100 | | | 15,900 |
| 7 | Stuart Bingham (ENG) (12) | | | **3,450** | 6,100 | | | | 1,600 | 11,150 |
| 8 | Judd Trump (ENG) (5) | | 1,100 | 6,100 | | | | | **3,200** | 10,400 |
| 9 | Stephen Maguire (SCO) (15) | | | | | 3,000 | 2,400 | 2,400 | | 7,800 |
| 10 | Luca Brecel (BEL)^{(1)} (14) | | 4,100 | 1,100 | 1,000 | | | | | 6,200 |
| 11 | Ali Carter (ENG) (17) | | | | 2,400 | 1,100 | **1,600** | | | 5,100 |
| 12 | Jimmy Robertson (ENG) (23) | 1,100 | 2,900 | 700 | | | | | | 4,700 |
| 13 | Kyren Wilson (ENG) (9) | | **3,400** | 1,000 | | | | | | 4,400 |
| 14 | David Gilbert (ENG)^{(2)} (19) | | | | | **3,100** | 1,100 | | | 4,200 |
| 15 | Ding Junhui (CHN) (8) | | | | | | | 4,100 | | 4,100 |
| 16 | Ricky Walden (ENG) (34) | 2,500 | 1,200 | | | | | | | 3,700 |
| 17 | Mark Davis (ENG) (35) | | | | | | 2,700 | 900 | | 3,600 |
| 18 | Anthony Hamilton (ENG) (30) | 2,200 | 1,000 | | | | | | | 3,200 |
| = | Noppon Saengkham (THA) (32) | | | | | | | 3,200 | | 3,200 |
| 20 | Mark King (ENG) (26) | 1,100 | | | | | | | | 1,100 |
| = | Ryan Day (WAL) (13) | | | | 1,100 | | | | | 1,100 |
| 22 | Graeme Dott (SCO) (22) | | | | 1,000 | | | | | 1,000 |
| = | Anthony McGill (SCO) (20) | | | | | 1,000 | | | | 1,000 |
| 24 | Robert Milkins (ENG) (32) | 900 | | | | | | | | 900 |
| = | Joe Perry (ENG) (18) | | | | | 900 | | | | 900 |
| = | Tom Ford (ENG) (28) | | | | | | | 900 | | 900 |
| = | Michael White (WAL) (36) | | | | | | | 900 | | 900 |
| 28 | Xiao Guodong (CHN) (25) | | | | | | 600 | | | 600 |
| | Total prize money | 18,900 | 20,100 | 19,900 | 19,300 | 19,300 | 19,600 | 19,500 | 41,200 | 177,800 |

Green: Won the group. Bold: Highest break in the group. All prize money in GBP.
Parenthesis: Ranking prior to tournament start, 1 January 2019.
Notes
^{(1)} Due to illness, Luca Brecel withdrew from the tournament prior to Group 5 play.
^{(2)} Barry Hawkins and David Gilbert withdrew from the tournament prior to Group 7 play.
