= Ben Woollaston =

English snooker player

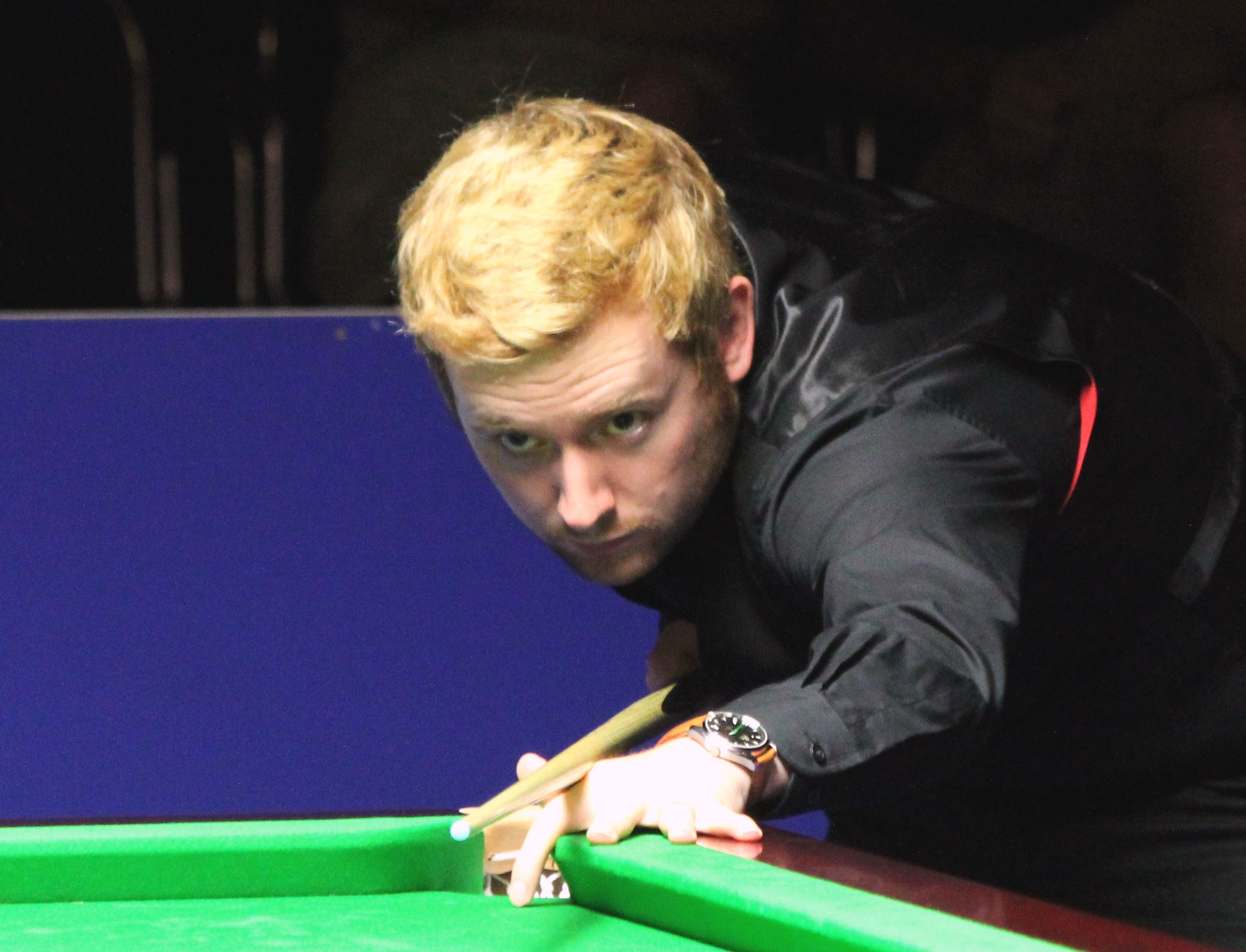
- Woollaston at the 2016 Paul Hunter Classic

Personal information
- Born: 14 May 1987 (age 39) Leicester, England

Sport
- Country: England
- Sport: Snooker
- Professional: 2004/2005, 2006–2008, 2009–present
- Highest ranking: 25 (March–April 2016 and February 2017)
- Current ranking: 51 (as of 7 November 2026)
- Maximum breaks: 1
- Century breaks: 185 (as of 19 November 2026)
- Best ranking finish: Runner-up (2015 Welsh Open)

Tournament wins
- Minor-ranking: 1

Ben Woollaston (born 14 May 1987) is an English professional snooker player from Leicester. His sole professional title came at the minor-ranking third Players Tour Championship event in 2011. Woollaston's only ranking event final came at the 2015 Welsh Open, in which he lost to John Higgins.

== Career ==
Born in Leicester, England, Woollaston began his professional career by playing the Challenge Tour in 2003, at the time the second-level professional tour. He first entered the Main Tour for the 2004–05 season, but was unable to retain his place for the following season. He regained his place for 2006–07 by winning the European Under-19 Championship. He was awarded a concessionary place for the 2007–08 tour. Woollaston has twice reached the final group stages of the Grand Prix in 2006 and 2007, enjoying a marginally better tournament in 2006 by winning two matches compared to none in 2007. He also reached the final stages of the 2007 Welsh Open, beating David Gray to reach the second round, in which he lost 2–5 to seven-time World Champion Stephen Hendry.

=== 2011/2012 season: First title ===
Woollaston's second professional title was Event 3 of the Players Tour Championship in the 2011–12 season. He defeated former World Champion Graeme Dott 4–2 in the final. His performances in the other 11 PTCs, including a quarter-final run in Event 8, saw him claim ninth place in the Order of Merit and therefore qualify for the 2012 Finals. It was the first time he made it to the main stages of a ranking event since 2007. He played Ding Junhui in the opening round and lost 2–4. Woollaston also qualified for the 2012 China Open by winning three qualifying matches, concluding with a 5–4 victory over Ryan Day. He played Ding again in the first round of the event, and looked to be on course for a shock result as he led 4–0 at the interval in the best-of-nine frame match. However, Ding found his form, and won five successive frames to take the match 5–4. His season concluded with a 3–10 loss to Dominic Dale in the final qualifying round for the World Championship and he finished ranked world number 43, meaning he had risen 26 places from the start of the season, the most of anyone on the tour.

=== 2012/2013 season ===
Woollaston failed to qualify for nine of the eleven ranking events in the 2012–13 season. He fared much better in the minor ranking PTC events, as he was a losing quarter-finalist in four of the ten tournaments to finish 10th on the Order of Merit. This saw him qualify for the Finals, where he defeated Mark Williams and Joe Perry both 4–3 to reach his first ever ranking event quarter-final. He played Kurt Maflin and was this time on the wrong end of a 4–3 scoreline. Woollaston kept his form going into the World Championship Qualifiers by beating Thailand's Thepchaiya Un-Nooh 10–3 in the third round to face Ryan Day, just one match short of reaching the main draw of the tournament for the first time. There was never more than a single frame between the players in the closing stages of the match with Woollaston compiling a vital break of 64 in the deciding frame to edge the match 10–9 and stated that he wanted to draw reigning champion Ronnie O'Sullivan in the first round as he felt he now had nothing to lose. He drew last year's runner-up Ali Carter and from leading 3–1 and 4–3 Woollaston lost seven frames in a row to exit the tournament, saying afterwards that he had struggled to maintain his confidence and concentration during the match. He climbed 10 spots in the rankings during the season to world number 33, his highest position to date.

=== 2013/2014 season ===
Woollaston qualified for five ranking events during the 2013–14 season, by far the most he has reached in a single season during his career. At the Wuxi Classic he beat Chen Zhe and Joel Walker both 5–2, before he lost 5–2 to Cao Yupeng in the last 16. Woollaston was defeated in the first round of the Australian Goldfields Open, the International Championship and the German Masters. He saw off Vinnie Calabrese and Alfie Burden with the loss of just one frame to reach the last 32 of the Welsh Open, where he came close to knocking out Ding Junhui but lost 4–3. In the minor-ranking European Tour event the Ruhr Open, Woollaston edged out reigning world champion Ronnie O'Sullivan 4–3 and then whitewashed Burden and Chris Norbury 4–0, before losing in a final frame decider to Stephen Maguire in the quarter-finals. He went a step further at the Antwerp Open by beating Joel Walker in the quarters, but O'Sullivan this time got the better of Woollaston to win 4–2 in the semi-finals. These results aided him to a 20th placing on the Order of Merit to qualify for the Finals for the third year in a row. Woollaston beat Ding, a four-time winner on the tour this season, 4–3 having been 3–0 behind to advance to the last 16 of a ranking event for the second time this campaign, where he was eliminated 4–2 by John Higgins.

=== 2014/2015 season: First ranking final ===
Woollaston was knocked out of the 2014 Wuxi Classic in the second round 5–3 by Judd Trump, and then failed to qualify for the next two ranking events. In the opening round of the International Championship he led Ronnie O'Sullivan 2–0 and 3–1, but went on to lose 6–4. Woollaston was also beaten 6–2 by the five-time world champion in the third round of the UK Championship, and afterward described his own performance as embarrassing. A week later he achieved the first maximum break of his career at the Lisbon Open in his last 128 match against Joe Steele, but lost 4–3 against Peter Ebdon in the next round. Woollaston won group 6 of the Championship League by seeing off Ebdon 3–0 and progressed through to the semi-finals of the winners' group where he lost 3–2 to Mark Davis.

At the Welsh Open, Woollaston eliminated Thanawat Thirapongpaiboon, Mark Davis, Mark Allen and Ali Carter. He then won four consecutive frames in beating Gary Wilson 5–2 to face home favourite Mark Williams in the semi-finals. Woollaston led 5–3 and missed multiple chances to wrap up the match in the next two frames allowing Williams to send it into a decider. He made a match-winning 60 break to play John Higgins - who had been the favourite player for Woollaston growing up – in his first ranking event final. Higgins fluked a green that helped him edge the first session 5–3 which seemed to sway the whole match as he took all four frames played upon the resumption of play to win 9–3. Afterwards, Woollaston stated that he had never felt he belonged with the top players in the televised stages of ranking events until this week. Woollaston came back from 67–0 down in the deciding frame of his first round Indian Open match to beat Yu Delu on a re-spotted black, and then lost 4–1 to Kyren Wilson in the second round. His best season to date ended with a 10–6 loss to Robin Hull in World Championship qualifying. Woollaston's ranking of 32 in the world after the event was at that point the highest he had ever finished a season.

=== 2015/2016 season ===
Woollaston lost 4–1 in the semi-finals of the Riga Open to Tom Ford and reached the quarter-finals of the Haining Open, but was beaten 4–2 by Robert Milkins. Two deciding frame victories over Robbie Williams and Yu Delu saw him reach the third round of the International Championship. After recovering from 5–2 down to Joe Perry, he almost won 6–5 for the third time in the week but this time lost the decider. Woollaston was beaten 6–2 in third round of the UK Championship by Shaun Murphy. He reached the quarter-finals of the Welsh Open for the second year in a row, but was defeated 5–1 by Joe Perry. Another came at the PTC Finals with wins over Jimmy Robertson and Matthew Selt and, though he had multiple chances to win the last frame, he lost 4–3 to Murphy. Woollaston lost 10–9 to Chris Wakelin in the first round of World Championship qualifying. He recorded a new career-high end of season world ranking of 27.

=== 2016/2017 season ===
At the World Open, Woollaston recorded 5–2 and 5–1 wins over Gary Wilson and Ding Junhui, and made a 135 to level his third round tie with Joe Perry at 4–4, but lost the deciding frame. He got to the fourth round of the English Open by beating Cao Yupeng 4–1, Zhang Anda 4–3, and Ali Carter 4–2, and was defeated 4–3 by Liang Wenbo. Woollaston overcame Elliot Slessor 6–5 and Paul Davison 6–4 at the UK Championship, before losing 6–2 to John Higgins. He recorded his first win over Neil Robertson by edging him out 5–4 in the first round of the German Masters and was then knocked out 5–2 by Barry Hawkins. Woollaston also played in the second round of the China Open, but lost 5–4 to Hossein Vafaei. His final-round qualifier match for the World Championship with Zhou Yuelong went to a deciding frame, which Woollaston lost.

== Personal life ==
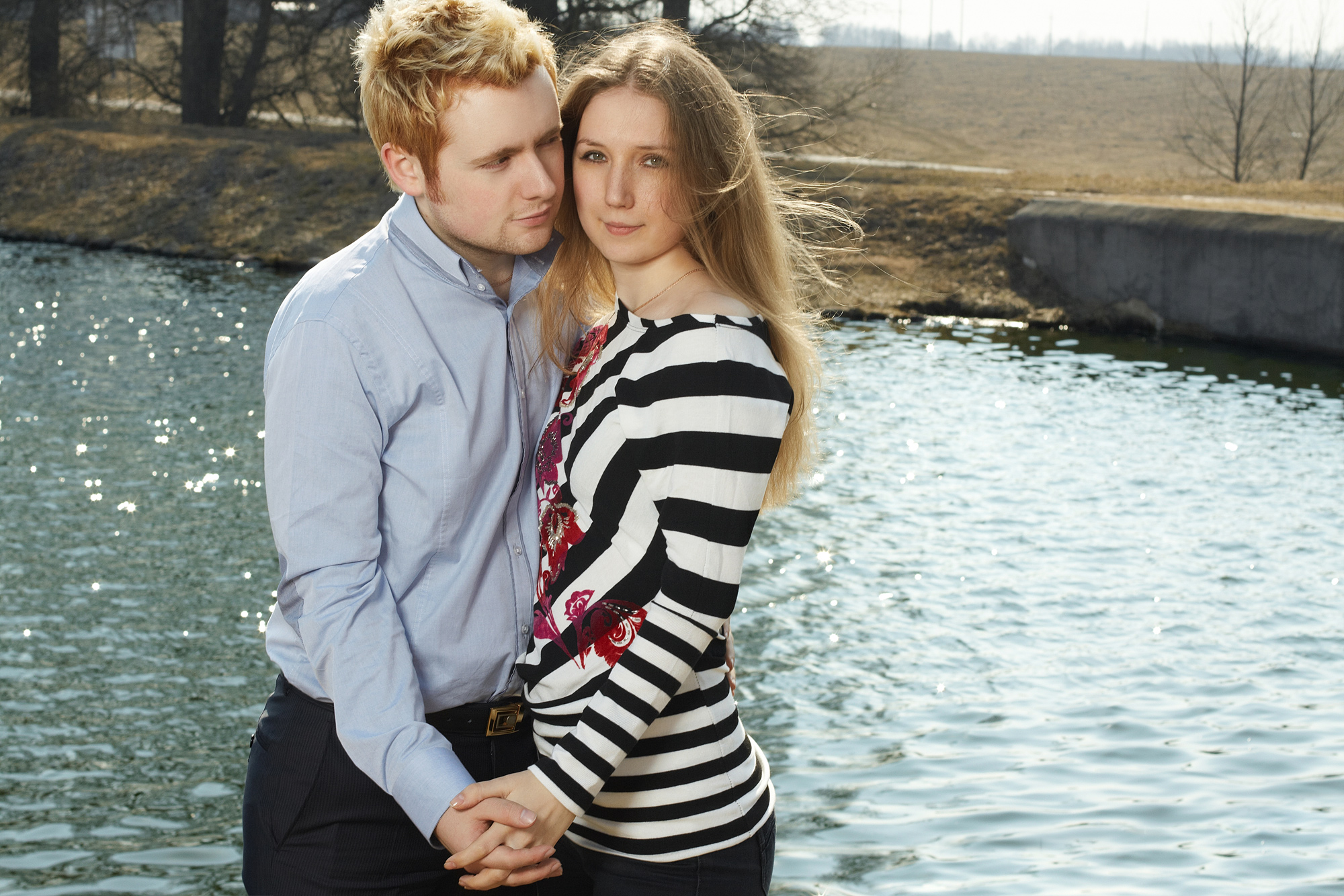
Ben Woollaston and his wife Tatiana, 2011

Woollaston met his wife Tatiana Torchilo, a Belarusian snooker referee, at the 2010 Paul Hunter Classic. They married in her hometown of Pinsk in June 2011, following a ten-month romance. They have two children.

He has suffered from chronic fatigue syndrome since 2021, which has hindered his ability to compete effectively at snooker.

Woollaston is also a qualified snooker coach, having first earned his WPBSA coaching badge in 2010.

== Performance and rankings timeline ==
Tournament	2003/ 04	2004/ 05	2006/ 07	2007/ 08	2009/ 10	2010/ 11	2011/ 12	2012/ 13	2013/ 14	2014/ 15	2015/ 16	2016/ 17	2017/ 18	2018/ 19	2019/ 20		2020/ 21	2021/ 22	2022/ 23	2023/ 24	2024/ 25	2025/ 26	2026/ 27
Ranking (Note: It shows the ranking at the beginning of the season)	(Note: He was an amateur)	(Note: New players don't have a ranking)		75		72	69	43	33	40	32	27	28	37	39		42	46	42	44	56	42	39
Ranking tournaments
Championship League	Not Held			Non-Ranking Event													RR	RR	2R	2R	2R	RR	RR
China Open	A	LQ	LQ	LQ	LQ	LQ	1R	LQ	LQ	LQ	2R	2R	2R	QF	Tournament Not Held								LQ
Wuhan Open	Tournament Not Held																			1R	3R	1R	LQ
British Open	A	LQ	Tournament Not Held															1R	3R	LQ	1R	1R	LQ
English Open	Tournament Not Held											4R	3R	3R	2R		4R	2R	1R	LQ	3R	1R	LQ
Shenzhen Open (Note: The event was called the Xi'an Grand Prix (2024/2025–2025/2026))	Tournament Not Held																				LQ	LQ	LQ
Northern Ireland Open	Tournament Not Held											1R	2R	1R	3R		4R	1R	1R	LQ	LQ	2R	LQ
International Championship	Tournament Not Held							LQ	1R	1R	3R	LQ	1R	1R	2R		Not Held			LQ	1R	1R	2R
UK Championship	A	LQ	LQ	LQ	LQ	LQ	LQ	LQ	1R	3R	3R	3R	2R	2R	3R		1R	4R	LQ	1R	LQ	1R	
Shoot Out	Tournament Not Held					Non-Ranking Event						1R	1R	2R	QF		1R	1R	3R	1R	1R	1R	
Scottish Open (Note: The event was called the Players Championship (2003/2004))	A	Tournament Not Held						MR	Not Held			2R	2R	2R	2R		2R	3R	1R	LQ	LQ	1R	
German Masters	Tournament Not Held					LQ	LQ	LQ	1R	LQ	2R	2R	1R	1R	LQ		LQ	LQ	LQ	1R	2R	LQ	LQ
Welsh Open	A	LQ	2R	LQ	LQ	LQ	LQ	LQ	3R	F	QF	1R	3R	2R	3R		2R	3R	1R	LQ	LQ	LQ	
World Grand Prix	Tournament Not Held									NR	1R	DNQ	DNQ	DNQ	DNQ		DNQ	1R	DNQ	DNQ	1R	DNQ	
Players Championship (Note: The event was called the Players Tour Championship Grand Final (2010/2011–2015/2016))	Tournament Not Held					DNQ	1R	QF	2R	DNQ	QF	DNQ	DNQ	DNQ	DNQ		DNQ	DNQ	DNQ	DNQ	DNQ	DNQ	
World Open (Note: The event was called the LG Cup (2003/2004) and the Grand Prix (2004/2005, 2006/2007–2007/2008 and 2009/2010))	A	LQ	RR	RR	LQ	LQ	LQ	LQ	LQ	Not Held		3R	2R	2R	1R		Not Held			3R	2R	LQ	
Tour Championship	Tournament Not Held													DNQ	DNQ		DNQ	DNQ	DNQ	DNQ	DNQ	DNQ	
World Championship	LQ	LQ	LQ	LQ	LQ	LQ	LQ	1R	LQ	LQ	LQ	LQ	LQ	LQ	LQ		LQ	LQ	LQ	LQ	2R	LQ	
Non-ranking tournaments
The Masters	LQ	A	LQ	LQ	LQ	A	A	A	A	A	A	A	A	A	A		A	A	A	A	A	A	
Championship League	Not Held			A	A	A	A	A	A	SF	RR	RR	RR	A	RR	F	A	A	A	A	A	RR	
Former ranking tournaments
Irish Masters	A	LQ	NR	Tournament Not Held																			
Northern Ireland Trophy	Not Held		LQ	LQ	Tournament Not Held																		
Wuxi Classic (Note: The event was called the Jiangsu Classic (2009/2010))	Tournament Not Held				Non-Ranking Event			LQ	3R	2R	Tournament Not Held												
Australian Goldfields Open	Tournament Not Held						LQ	LQ	1R	LQ	WR	Tournament Not Held											
Shanghai Masters	Not Held			LQ	LQ	LQ	LQ	LQ	LQ	LQ	LQ	1R	2R	Non-Ranking			Not Held			Non-Ranking Event			
Paul Hunter Classic (Note: The event was called the Grand Prix Fürth (2004/2005) and the Fürth German Open (2006/2007))	NH	Pro-am Event				Minor-Ranking Event						1R	QF	2R	NR		Tournament Not Held						
Indian Open	Tournament Not Held								LQ	2R	NH	LQ	2R	1R	Tournament Not Held								
Riga Masters (Note: The event was called the Riga Open (2014/2015–2015/2016))	Tournament Not Held									Minor-Rank		LQ	1R	1R	2R		Tournament Not Held						
China Championship	Tournament Not Held											NR	1R	LQ	1R		Tournament Not Held						
WST Pro Series	Tournament Not Held																2R	Tournament Not Held					
Turkish Masters	Tournament Not Held																	1R	Tournament Not Held				
Gibraltar Open	Tournament Not Held										MR	3R	1R	3R	4R		2R	4R	Tournament Not Held				
WST Classic	Tournament Not Held																		2R	Tournament Not Held			
European Masters (Note: The event was called the European Open (2003/2004) Malta Cup (2004/2005 and 2006/2007–2007/2008))	A	LQ	LQ	NR	Tournament Not Held							1R	3R	LQ	LQ		2R	LQ	LQ	3R	Not Held		
Saudi Arabia Masters	Tournament Not Held																				5R	5R	NH
Former non-ranking tournaments
World Grand Prix	Tournament Not Held									1R	Ranking Event												
Shoot Out	Tournament Not Held					A	1R	2R	2R	QF	3R	Ranking Event											
Six-red World Championship (Note: The event was called the Six-red World Grand Prix (2009/2010))	Tournament Not Held				A	A	NH	A	A	A	A	2R	2R	A	A		Not Held		LQ	Tournament Not Held			

Performance Table Legend
LQ	lost in the qualifying draw	#R	lost in the early rounds of the tournament (WR = Wildcard round, RR = Round robin)	QF	lost in the quarter-finals
SF	lost in the semi-finals	F	lost in the final	W	won the tournament
DNQ	did not qualify for the tournament	A	did not participate in the tournament	WD	withdrew from the tournament

NH / Not Held	means an event was not held
NR / Non-Ranking Event	means an event is/was no longer a ranking event
R / Ranking Event	means an event is/was a ranking event
MR / Minor-Ranking Event	means an event is/was a minor-ranking event
PA / Pro-am Event	means an event is/was a pro-am event

== Career finals ==
=== Ranking finals: 1 ===
Outcome	No.	Year	Championship	Opponent in the final	Score
Runner-up	1.	2015	Welsh Open	(Scotland) John Higgins	3–9

=== Minor-ranking finals: 1 (1 title) ===
Outcome	No.	Year	Championship	Opponent in the final	Score
Winner	1.	2011	Players Tour Championship – Event 3	(Scotland) Graeme Dott	4–2

=== Non-ranking finals: 1 ===
Outcome	No.	Year	Championship	Opponent in the final	Score
Runner-up	1.	2020	Championship League (June)	(Belgium) Luca Brecel	Round-Robin

=== Pro-am finals: 3 (1 title) ===
Outcome	No.	Year	Championship	Opponent in the final	Score
Runner-up	1.	2006	Baltic Cup	(Wales) Jamie Jones	3–5
Winner	1.	2006	Pontins Pro-Am - Event 5	(England) Dave Harold	4–1
Runner-up	2.	2008	Paul Hunter English Open	(China) Xiao Guodong	2–6

=== Amateur finals: 5 (3 titles) ===
Outcome	No.	Year	Championship	Opponent in the final	Score
Winner	1.	2001	English Under-14 Championship	(England) Alex Davies	4–1
Winner	2.	2002	English Under-15 Championship	(England) Judd Trump	5–1
Runner-up	1.	2003	English Amateur Championship	(England) Alex Davies	7–8
Winner	3.	2006	European Under-19 Championship	(Republic of Ireland) Vincent Muldoon	6–4
Runner-up	2.	2009	PIOS – Event 8	(England) Joe Jogia	5–6

=== Team finals: 1 (1 title) ===
Outcome	No.	Year	Championship	Team/partner	Opponent in the final	Score
Winner	1.	2014	World Mixed Doubles Championship	(Belarus) Yana Shut	(Wales) Jamie Clarke (Belgium) Wendy Jans	3–0
