= Championship League =

English snooker tournament

Tournament information
- Venue: Leicester Arena
- Location: Leicester
- Country: England
- Established: 2008
- Organisation(s): Matchroom Sport
- Total prize fund: £533,000 £205,000 (invitational) £328,000 (ranking)
- Recent edition: 2026 (invitational); 2026 (ranking)
- Current champion: Mark Selby (ENG) (invitational); Jak Jones (WAL) (ranking)

Championship League Snooker (CLS) is a professional snooker tournament devised by Matchroom Sport, held in both ranking and non-ranking (known as Championship League Invitational) formats throughout the snooker season. The tournament began in 2008 as an invitational event, with the ranking tournament beginning in 2020. It is one of the only main tour events that is not directly sanctioned by the World Snooker Tour, along with the Champion of Champions.

Mark Selby is the reigning champion of the invitational event, and Jak Jones is the reigning champion of the ranking event.

== Overview ==
The tournament was initially set up as an invitational qualifier to the Premier League Snooker series, where there are no audience and matches are played behind closed doors, matches are allocated in groups and spread over the course of a month. Despite the discontinuation of the Premier League in 2012, it remained as a standalone event and has since kept the unique format. The tournament was originally held at the Crondon Park Golf Club in Stock, Essex until 2016 and has since been held in Coventry, Barnsley, Milton Keynes and currently in Leicester.

In June 2020 there was a one‑off, round‑robin, non‑ranking edition of the tournament.

A ranking version of the tournament began in the 2020–21 season and is held alongside the non-ranking version. In contrast to the invitational event, which is usually held during the second half of the snooker season, it is held as the first event of the season since 2021 and has the smallest prize fund of all ranking events.

=== Format ===
==== Invitational version ====
In the invitational, non‑ranking version, 25 players take part, although players often withdraw and are replaced by others. Players earn money for every frame won and there are also prizes for being a semi‑finalist, runner‑up and winner of each group, with more money involved in the winners' group. In the first two years all matches in the group stages were the best‑of‑four, meaning that the matches could end in a draw as all the four frames were played, and the semi‑finals and final were best‑of‑five.

The competition runs over eight groups, each consisting of seven players. From the league stage of the first seven groups the top four qualify for a play‑off, the winner of which qualifies for the winners' group. The bottom two players of each group are eliminated and the remaining four move to the next group, where they are joined by three more players until the seventh group. In each group, the players are ranked by the number of matches won, then by most frames won, and then by least frames lost. If two players are tied by these criteria, the player who won the match between them is ranked higher in the table. The winners play in the final group with the champion taking a place in the following season's Champion of Champions (the same year's Premier League before 2013).

==== Ranking version ====
In the ranking version, 128 players take part in 32 rounds of group matches with each group consisting of four players. All matches are the best‑of‑four with three points awarded for a win and one point for a draw. The 32 players that top the group tables qualify for the second stage, consisting of eight groups of four players, and the eight winners from the second stage qualify for the two final groups. In each group, the players are ranked by points scored, frame difference and then head‑to‑head results between players who are tied. Places that are still tied are then determined by the highest break made in the group. If the highest break is also tied, the next highest break made by the players is used. The winners of the two final groups play a best‑of‑five final. The champion takes a place in the same season's Champion of Champions.

=== Maximum breaks ===
There have been 25 maximum breaks in the history of the tournament.

No.	Season	Event	Group	Date	Player	Ref
1	2013–14	2014	2	8 January 2014	Shaun Murphy (ENG)	
2	2014–15	2015 (1st)	1	5 January 2015	Barry Hawkins (ENG)	
3	2014–15	2015 (2nd)	7	10 February 2015	David Gilbert (ENG)	
4	2015–16	2016	6	25 February 2016	Fergal O'Brien (IRL)	
5	2016–17	2017 (1st)	3	10 January 2017	Mark Davis (ENG)	
6	2016–17	2017 (2nd)	Winners	2 March 2017	Mark Davis (ENG)	
7	2017–18	2018 (1st)	6	26 January 2018	Martin Gould (ENG)	
8	2017–18	2018 (2nd)	7	26 March 2018	Luca Brecel (BEL)	
9	2018–19	2019 (Note: the 147th official maximum break.)	5	22 January 2019	David Gilbert (ENG)	
10	2020–21	2020 (Note: Ranking tournament.) (1st)	Stage 1, Group 2	13 September 2020	Ryan Day (WAL)	
11	2020–21	2020 (2nd)	Stage 3, Group 2	30 October 2020	John Higgins (SCO)	
12	2020–21	2021	1	4 January 2021	Stuart Bingham (ENG)	
13	2023–24	2024 (1st)	3	6 February 2024	Kyren Wilson (ENG)	
14	2023–24	2024 (2nd)	5	10 February 2024	John Higgins (SCO)	
15	2023–24	2024 (Note: the 200th official maximum break.) (3rd)	7	29 February 2024	Joe O'Connor (ENG)	
16	2024–25	2025 (1st)	2	7 January 2025	Jak Jones (WAL)	
17	2024–25	2025 (2nd)	7	25 January 2025	David Gilbert (ENG)	
18	2024–25	2025 (3rd)	Winners	5 February 2025	Mark Selby (ENG)	
19	2025–26	2025	Stage 1, Group 29	17 July 2025	Fan Zhengyi (CHN)	
20	2025–26	2026 (1st)	1	2 January 2026	Chris Wakelin (ENG)	
21	2025–26	2026 (2nd)	4	8 January 2026	Matthew Selt (ENG)	
22	2025–26	2026 (3rd)	6	21 January 2026	Xiao Guodong (CHN)	
23	2025–26	2026 (4th)	6	21 January 2026	Wu Yize (CHN)	
24	2025–26	2026 (5th)	6	22 January 2026	Zhao Xintong (CHN)	
25	2026–27	2026	Stage 1, Group 6	7 July 2026	Si Jiahui (CHN)	

=== Prize fund ===
The breakdown of prize money for both the invitational and ranking versions of the Championship League is shown below.

==== Invitational version ====
Groups 1–7

- Winner: £3,000
- Runner-up: £2,000
- Semi-final: £1,000
- Frame-win (league stage): £100
- Frame-win (play-offs): £300
- Highest break (from 2011 to present): £500

Winners' Group

- Winner: £10,000
- Runner-up: £5,000
- Semi-final: £3,000
- Frame-win (league stage): £200 (£300 in 2011 and 2012)
- Frame-win (play-offs): £300
- Highest break (from 2011 to present): £1,000

- Maximum possible tournament total (since 2013): £205,000 (if all match results are 3‍–‍2)
- Minimum possible tournament total (since 2013): £152,800 (if all match results are 3‍–‍0)

==== Ranking version ====
Stage One

- Winner: £3,000
- Runner-up: £2,000
- Third place: £1,000
- Fourth place: £0

Stage Two

- Winner: £4,000
- Runner-up: £3,000
- Third place: £2,000
- Fourth place: £1,000

Stage Three

- Winner: £6,000
- Runner-up: £4,000
- Third place: £2,000
- Fourth place: £1,000

Final

- Winner: £20,000
- Runner-up: £10,000

- Tournament total: £328,000

Note: The champion receives a total of £33,000 (£3,000 + £4,000 + £6,000 + £20,000).

== Winners ==
Year	Winner	Score	Runner-up	Season	Venue (England)
Invitational tournaments (non-ranking, 2008–present)
2008	Joe Perry (ENG)	3–1	Mark Selby (ENG)	2007/08	Crondon Park Golf Club in Stock, Essex
2009	Judd Trump (ENG)	3–2	Mark Selby (ENG)	2008/09	Crondon Park Golf Club in Stock, Essex
2010	Marco Fu (HKG)	3–2	Mark Allen (NIR)	2009/10	Crondon Park Golf Club in Stock, Essex
2011	Matthew Stevens (WAL)	3–1	Shaun Murphy (ENG)	2010/11	Crondon Park Golf Club in Stock, Essex
2012	Ding Junhui (CHN)	3–1	Judd Trump (ENG)	2011/12	Crondon Park Golf Club in Stock, Essex
2013	Martin Gould (ENG)	3–2	Ali Carter (ENG)	2012/13	Crondon Park Golf Club in Stock, Essex
2014	Judd Trump (ENG)	3–1	Martin Gould (ENG)	2013/14	Crondon Park Golf Club in Stock, Essex
2015	Stuart Bingham (ENG)	3–2	Mark Davis (ENG)	2014/15	Crondon Park Golf Club in Stock, Essex
2016	Judd Trump (ENG)	3–2	Ronnie O'Sullivan (ENG)	2015/16	Crondon Park Golf Club in Stock, Essex
2017	John Higgins (SCO)	3–0	Ryan Day (WAL)	2016/17	Ricoh Arena in Coventry
2018	John Higgins (SCO)	3–2	Zhou Yuelong (CHN)	2017/18	Ricoh Arena in Coventry
2019	Martin Gould (ENG)	3–1	Jack Lisowski (ENG)	2018/19	Ricoh Arena in Coventry and Barnsley Metrodome in Barnsley
2020 (March)	Scott Donaldson (SCO)	3–0	Graeme Dott (SCO)	2019/20	Leicester Arena in Leicester
2020 (June)	Luca Brecel (BEL)	R–R (Note: A one-off, round-robin, non-ranking edition of the tournament was played in a different format to the usual event, in June 2020.)	Ben Woollaston (ENG)	2019/20	Marshall Arena in Milton Keynes
2021	Kyren Wilson (ENG)	3–2	Mark Williams (WAL)	2020/21	Ballroom, Stadium MK in Milton Keynes
2022	John Higgins (SCO)	3–2	Stuart Bingham (ENG)	2021/22	Leicester Arena in Leicester
2023	John Higgins (SCO)	3–1	Judd Trump (ENG)	2022/23	Leicester Arena in Leicester
2024	Mark Selby (ENG)	3–1	Joe O'Connor (ENG)	2023/24	Leicester Arena in Leicester
2025	Mark Selby (ENG)	3–0	Kyren Wilson (ENG)	2024/25	Leicester Arena in Leicester
2026	Mark Selby (ENG)	3–1	Wu Yize (CHN)	2025/26	Leicester Arena in Leicester
Ranking tournaments (2020–present)
2020	Kyren Wilson (ENG)	3–1	Judd Trump (ENG)	2020/21	Ballroom, Stadium MK in Milton Keynes
2021	David Gilbert (ENG)	3–1	Mark Allen (NIR)	2021/22	Leicester Arena in Leicester
2022	Luca Brecel (BEL)	3–1	Lu Ning (CHN)	2022/23	Leicester Arena in Leicester
2023	Shaun Murphy (ENG)	3–0	Mark Williams (WAL)	2023/24	Leicester Arena in Leicester
2024	Ali Carter (ENG)	3–1	Jackson Page (WAL)	2024/25	Leicester Arena in Leicester
2025	Stephen Maguire (SCO)	3–1	Joe O'Connor (ENG)	2025/26	Leicester Arena in Leicester
2026	Jak Jones (WAL)	3–2	David Gilbert (ENG)	2026/27	Leicester Arena in Leicester
