= 2016 Championship League =

Championship League
Tournament information
- Dates: 4 January – 3 March 2016
- Venue: Crondon Park Golf Club
- City: Stock
- Country: England
- Format: Non-ranking event
- Total prize fund: £179,700
- Winner's share: £10,000 (plus bonuses)
- Highest break: Fergal O'Brien (IRL) (147)

Final
- Champion: Judd Trump (ENG)
- Runner-up: Ronnie O'Sullivan (ENG)
- Score: 3–2

The 2016 Championship League was a professional non-ranking snooker tournament that was played from 4 January to 3 March 2016 at the Crondon Park Golf Club in Stock, England.

Stuart Bingham was the defending champion, but he was eliminated at the league stage of group seven. Judd Trump clinched his third Championship League title after a 3–2 win over Ronnie O'Sullivan in the final. Mark Williams took the largest share of the prize money thanks to a lucrative campaign through 4 groups before qualifying for the winners' group.

Fergal O'Brien made the 118th official maximum break during his league stage match against Mark Davis in group six. This was O'Brien's first official 147 break and the fourth in the 2015/2016 season. O'Brien also became the oldest player to make an official 147, at the age of 43. His record was surpassed in the following year's edition of the Championship League, when Mark Davis became the oldest player to score a maximum break, at the age of 44. Davis even scored two 147s in that year's Championship League.

== Prize fund ==
The breakdown of prize money for this year is shown below. The maximum possible prize money, if the full five frames are played in each game, is £205,000.

- Group 1–7
  - Winner: £3,000
  - Runner-up: £2,000
  - Semi-final: £1,000
  - Frame-win (league stage): £100
  - Frame-win (play-offs): £300
  - Highest break: £500
- Winners' group
  - Winner: £10,000
  - Runner-up: £5,000
  - Semi-final: £3,000
  - Frame-win (league stage): £200
  - Frame-win (play-offs): £300
  - Highest break: £1,000
- Tournament total: £179,700

== Group one ==
Group one was played on 4 and 5 January 2016. Ronnie O'Sullivan was the first player to qualify for the winners group.

=== Matches ===
- Ronnie O'Sullivan 3–2 Mark Williams
- John Higgins 0–3 Barry Hawkins
- Ricky Walden 0–3 Ronnie O'Sullivan
- Robert Milkins 3–2 Ryan Day
- Mark Williams 3–1 John Higgins
- Barry Hawkins 2–3 Robert Milkins
- Ronnie O'Sullivan 3–2 John Higgins
- Ryan Day 2–3 Ricky Walden
- Mark Williams 3–2 Barry Hawkins
- Robert Milkins 1–3 Ricky Walden
- Ryan Day 2–3 Barry Hawkins
- John Higgins 3–1 Ricky Walden
- Ronnie O'Sullivan 3–2 Ryan Day
- Mark Williams 1–3 Robert Milkins
- John Higgins 0–3 Ryan Day
- Barry Hawkins 1–3 Ricky Walden
- Ronnie O'Sullivan 3–1 Robert Milkins
- Mark Williams 3–1 Ricky Walden
- John Higgins 3–2 Robert Milkins
- Mark Williams 3–1 Ryan Day
- Ronnie O'Sullivan 3–1 Barry Hawkins

=== Table ===
Pos	Player	Pld	W	L	FF	FA	FD	
1	Ronnie O'Sullivan (ENG)	6	6	0	18	8	+10	Qualification to Group 1 play-off
2	Mark Williams (WAL)	6	4	2	15	11	+4	Qualification to Group 1 play-off
3	Robert Milkins (ENG)	6	3	3	13	14	−1	Qualification to Group 1 play-off
4	Ricky Walden (ENG)	6	3	3	11	13	−2	Qualification to Group 1 play-off
5	Barry Hawkins (ENG)	6	2	4	12	14	−2	Advances into Group 2
6	John Higgins (SCO)	6	2	4	9	15	−6	Eliminated from the competition
7	Ryan Day (WAL)	6	1	5	12	15	−3	Eliminated from the competition

=== Play-offs ===
Semi-finals; Best of 5 frames
Ronnie O'Sullivan (ENG)	3
Ricky Walden (ENG)	0
Mark Williams (WAL)	1
Robert Milkins (ENG)	3

Final; Best of 5 frames
Ronnie O'Sullivan (ENG)	3
Robert Milkins (ENG)	0

== Group two ==
Group two was played on 6 and 7 January 2016. The group was won by Judd Trump.

=== Matches ===
- Mark Selby 3–2 Judd Trump
- Joe Perry 2–3 Barry Hawkins
- Ricky Walden 0–3 Mark Selby
- Mark Williams 3–1 Robert Milkins
- Judd Trump 1–3 Joe Perry
- Barry Hawkins 1–3 Mark Williams
- Mark Selby 3–1 Joe Perry
- Robert Milkins 1–3 Ricky Walden
- Judd Trump 3–0 Barry Hawkins
- Mark Williams 2–3 Ricky Walden
- Robert Milkins 3–1 Barry Hawkins
- Joe Perry 3–1 Ricky Walden
- Mark Selby 3–1 Robert Milkins
- Judd Trump 3–2 Mark Williams
- Joe Perry 3–2 Robert Milkins
- Barry Hawkins 3–0 Ricky Walden
- Mark Selby 3–2 Mark Williams
- Judd Trump 0–3 Ricky Walden
- Joe Perry 1–3 Mark Williams
- Judd Trump 3–1 Robert Milkins
- Mark Selby 3–0 Barry Hawkins

=== Table ===
Pos	Player	Pld	W	L	FF	FA	FD	
1	Mark Selby (ENG)	6	6	0	18	6	+12	Qualification to Group 2 play-off
2	Mark Williams (WAL)	6	3	3	15	12	+3	Qualification to Group 2 play-off
3	Joe Perry (ENG)	6	3	3	13	13	0	Qualification to Group 2 play-off
4	Judd Trump (ENG)	6	3	3	12	12	0	Qualification to Group 2 play-off
5	Ricky Walden (ENG)	6	3	3	10	12	−2	Advances into Group 3
6	Barry Hawkins (ENG)	6	2	4	8	14	−6	Eliminated from the competition
7	Robert Milkins (ENG)	6	1	5	9	16	−7	Eliminated from the competition

=== Play-offs ===
Semi-finals; Best of 5 frames
Mark Selby (ENG)	0
Judd Trump (ENG)	3
Mark Williams (WAL)	3
Joe Perry (ENG)	0

Final; Best of 5 frames
Judd Trump (ENG)	3
Mark Williams (WAL)	1

== Group three ==
Group three was played on 25 and 26 January 2016. The group was won by Stephen Maguire.

=== Matches ===
- Stephen Maguire 3–1 Marco Fu
- Michael White 0–3 Ricky Walden
- Mark Selby 1–3 Stephen Maguire
- Joe Perry 3–2 Mark Williams
- Marco Fu 0–3 Michael White
- Ricky Walden 3–2 Joe Perry
- Stephen Maguire 3–2 Michael White
- Mark Williams 0–3 Mark Selby
- Marco Fu 3–0 Ricky Walden
- Joe Perry 0–3 Mark Selby
- Mark Williams 2–3 Ricky Walden
- Michael White 3–2 Mark Selby
- Stephen Maguire 2–3 Mark Williams
- Marco Fu 0–3 Joe Perry
- Michael White 3–2 Mark Williams
- Ricky Walden 1–3 Mark Selby
- Stephen Maguire 3–2 Joe Perry
- Marco Fu 1–3 Mark Selby
- Michael White 3–0 Joe Perry
- Marco Fu 1–3 Mark Williams
- Stephen Maguire 3–1 Ricky Walden

=== Table ===
Pos	Player	Pld	W	L	FF	FA	FD	
1	Stephen Maguire (SCO)	6	5	1	17	10	+7	Qualification to Group 3 play-off
2	Mark Selby (ENG)	6	4	2	15	8	+7	Qualification to Group 3 play-off
3	Michael White (WAL)	6	4	2	14	10	+4	Qualification to Group 3 play-off
4	Ricky Walden (ENG)	6	3	3	11	13	−2	Qualification to Group 3 play-off
5	Mark Williams (WAL)	6	2	4	12	15	−3	Advances into Group 4
6	Joe Perry (ENG)	6	2	4	10	14	−4	Eliminated from the competition
7	Marco Fu (HKG)	6	1	5	6	15	−9	Eliminated from the competition

=== Play-offs ===
Semi-finals; Best of 5 frames
Stephen Maguire (SCO)	3
Ricky Walden (ENG)	0
Mark Selby (ENG)	3
Michael White (WAL)	0

Final; Best of 5 frames
Stephen Maguire (SCO)	3
Mark Selby (ENG)	2

== Group four ==
Group four was played on 27 and 28 January 2016. The group was won by Mark Williams.

=== Matches ===
- Neil Robertson 3–0 Ben Woollaston
- Graeme Dott 1–3 Mark Williams
- Ricky Walden 1–3 Neil Robertson
- Michael White 2–3 Mark Selby
- Ben Woollaston 3–0 Graeme Dott
- Mark Williams 3–0 Michael White
- Neil Robertson 2–3 Graeme Dott
- Mark Selby 3–0 Ricky Walden
- Ben Woollaston 1–3 Mark Williams
- Michael White 0–3 Ricky Walden
- Mark Selby 2–3 Mark Williams
- Graeme Dott 3–2 Ricky Walden
- Neil Robertson 1–3 Mark Selby
- Ben Woollaston 1–3 Michael White
- Graeme Dott 3–2 Mark Selby
- Mark Williams 3–2 Ricky Walden
- Neil Robertson 3–1 Michael White
- Ben Woollaston 1–3 Ricky Walden
- Graeme Dott 1–3 Michael White
- Ben Woollaston 0–3 Mark Selby
- Neil Robertson 3–2 Mark Williams

=== Table ===
Pos	Player	Pld	W	L	FF	FA	FD	
1	Mark Williams (WAL)	6	5	1	17	9	+8	Qualification to Group 4 play-off
2	Mark Selby (ENG)	6	4	2	16	9	+7	Qualification to Group 4 play-off
3	Neil Robertson (AUS)	6	4	2	15	10	+5	Qualification to Group 4 play-off
4	Graeme Dott (SCO)	6	3	3	11	15	−4	Qualification to Group 4 play-off
5	Ricky Walden (ENG)	6	2	4	11	13	−2	Advances into Group 5
6	Michael White (WAL)	6	2	4	9	14	−5	Eliminated from the competition
7	Ben Woollaston (ENG)	6	1	5	6	15	−9	Eliminated from the competition

=== Play-offs ===
Semi-finals; Best of 5 frames
Mark Williams (WAL)	3
Graeme Dott (SCO)	2
Mark Selby (ENG)	3
Neil Robertson (AUS)	1

Final; Best of 5 frames
Mark Williams (WAL)	3
Mark Selby (ENG)	0

== Group five ==
Group five was played on 22 and 23 February 2016. Neil Robertson withdrew and was replaced by Michael Holt. The group was won by Mark Selby.

=== Matches ===
- David Gilbert 2–3 Mark Davis
- Kyren Wilson 3–0 Ricky Walden
- Graeme Dott 3–1 David Gilbert
- Michael Holt 0–3 Mark Selby
- Mark Davis 3–1 Kyren Wilson
- Ricky Walden 2–3 Michael Holt
- David Gilbert 1–3 Kyren Wilson
- Mark Selby 3–0 Graeme Dott
- Mark Davis 0–3 Ricky Walden
- Michael Holt 3–0 Graeme Dott
- Mark Selby 3–1 Ricky Walden
- Kyren Wilson 1–3 Graeme Dott
- David Gilbert 1–3 Mark Selby
- Mark Davis 3–1 Michael Holt
- Kyren Wilson 3–1 Mark Selby
- Ricky Walden 2–3 Graeme Dott
- David Gilbert 2–3 Michael Holt
- Mark Davis 3–1 Graeme Dott
- Kyren Wilson 3–1 Michael Holt
- Mark Davis 1–3 Mark Selby
- David Gilbert 3–0 Ricky Walden

=== Table ===
Pos	Player	Pld	W	L	FF	FA	FD	
1	Mark Selby (ENG)	6	5	1	16	6	+10	Qualification to Group 5 play-off
2	Kyren Wilson (ENG)	6	4	2	14	9	+5	Qualification to Group 5 play-off
3	Mark Davis (ENG)	6	4	2	13	11	+2	Qualification to Group 5 play-off
4	Michael Holt (ENG)	6	3	3	11	13	−2	Qualification to Group 5 play-off
5	Graeme Dott (SCO)	6	3	3	10	13	−3	Advances into Group 6
6	David Gilbert (ENG)	6	1	5	10	15	−5	Eliminated from the competition
7	Ricky Walden (ENG)	6	1	5	8	15	−7	Eliminated from the competition

=== Play-offs ===
Semi-finals; Best of 5 frames
Mark Selby (ENG)	3
Michael Holt (ENG)	0
Kyren Wilson (ENG)	3
Mark Davis (ENG)	2

Final; Best of 5 frames
Mark Selby (ENG)	3
Kyren Wilson (ENG)	1

== Group six ==
Group six was played on 24 and 25 February 2016. Graeme Dott withdrew and was replaced by Dominic Dale. The group was won by Ali Carter.

=== Matches ===
- Mark Davis 2–3 Kyren Wilson
- Fergal O'Brien 3–2 Martin Gould
- Allister Carter 3–1 Dominic Dale
- Michael Holt 2–3 Fergal O'Brien
- Martin Gould 1–3 Allister Carter
- Dominic Dale 2–3 Mark Davis
- Kyren Wilson 2–3 Michael Holt
- Fergal O'Brien 2–3 Allister Carter
- Martin Gould 1–3 Dominic Dale
- Mark Davis 3–1 Michael Holt
- Michael Holt 3–2 Allister Carter
- Kyren Wilson 2–3 Dominic Dale
- Fergal O'Brien 1–3 Kyren Wilson
- Martin Gould 3–2 Mark Davis
- Allister Carter 3–0 Kyren Wilson
- Dominic Dale 3–2 Michael Holt
- Michael Holt 3–1 Martin Gould
- Fergal O'Brien 1–3 Mark Davis
- Fergal O'Brien 0–3 Dominic Dale
- Martin Gould 3–2 Kyren Wilson
- Allister Carter 3–0 Mark Davis

=== Table ===
Pos	Player	Pld	W	L	FF	FA	FD	
1	Ali Carter (ENG)	6	5	1	17	7	+10	Qualification to Group 6 play-off
2	Dominic Dale (WAL)	6	4	2	15	11	+4	Qualification to Group 6 play-off
3	Michael Holt (ENG)	6	3	3	14	14	0	Qualification to Group 6 play-off
4	Mark Davis (ENG)	6	3	3	13	13	0	Qualification to Group 6 play-off
5	Kyren Wilson (ENG)	6	2	4	12	15	−3	Advances into Group 7
6	Martin Gould (ENG)	6	2	4	11	16	−5	Eliminated from the competition
7	Fergal O'Brien (IRL)	6	2	4	10	16	−6	Eliminated from the competition

=== Play-offs ===
Semi-finals; Best of 5 frames
Ali Carter (ENG)	3
Mark Davis (ENG)	0
Dominic Dale (WAL)	3
Michael Holt (ENG)	0

Final; Best of 5 frames
Ali Carter (ENG)	3
Dominic Dale (WAL)	1

== Group seven ==
Group seven was played on 29 February and 1 March 2016. Matthew Selt won the group to take the final spot in the winners' group.

=== Matches ===
- Matthew Selt 3–0 Liang Wenbo
- Stuart Bingham 1–3 Kyren Wilson
- Mark Davis 2–3 Matthew Selt
- Michael Holt 2–3 Dominic Dale
- Liang Wenbo 3–2 Stuart Bingham
- Kyren Wilson 3–0 Michael Holt
- Dominic Dale 1–3 Mark Davis
- Matthew Selt 2–3 Stuart Bingham
- Liang Wenbo 3–1 Kyren Wilson
- Michael Holt 2–3 Mark Davis
- Dominic Dale 1–3 Kyren Wilson
- Stuart Bingham 0–3 Mark Davis
- Matthew Selt 0–3 Dominic Dale
- Liang Wenbo 3–2 Michael Holt
- Stuart Bingham 3–1 Dominic Dale
- Kyren Wilson 1–3 Mark Davis
- Matthew Selt 3–1 Michael Holt
- Liang Wenbo 3–0 Mark Davis
- Stuart Bingham 3–1 Michael Holt
- Liang Wenbo 3–0 Dominic Dale
- Matthew Selt 3–2 Kyren Wilson

=== Table ===
Pos	Player	Pld	W	L	FF	FA	FD	
1	Liang Wenbo (CHN)	6	5	1	15	8	+7	Qualification to Group 7 play-off
2	Mark Davis (ENG)	6	4	2	14	10	+4	Qualification to Group 7 play-off
3	Matthew Selt (ENG)	6	4	2	14	11	+3	Qualification to Group 7 play-off
4	Kyren Wilson (ENG)	6	3	3	13	11	+2	Qualification to Group 7 play-off
5	Stuart Bingham (ENG)	6	3	3	12	13	−1	Eliminated from the competition
6	Dominic Dale (WAL)	6	2	4	9	14	−5	Eliminated from the competition
7	Michael Holt (ENG)	6	0	6	8	18	−10	Eliminated from the competition

=== Play-offs ===
Semi-finals; Best of 5 frames
Liang Wenbo (CHN)	3
Kyren Wilson (ENG)	2
Mark Davis (ENG)	1
Matthew Selt (ENG)	3

Final; Best of 5 frames
Liang Wenbo (CHN)	2
Matthew Selt (ENG)	3

== Winners' group ==
The winners' group was played on 2 and 3 March 2016. Judd Trump beat Ronnie O'Sullivan 3–2 in the final to take the third Championship League title of his career.

=== Matches ===
- Ronnie O'Sullivan 3–0 Judd Trump
- Stephen Maguire 2–3 Mark Williams
- Mark Selby 2–3 Ronnie O'Sullivan
- Ali Carter 3–1 Matthew Selt
- Judd Trump 3–1 Stephen Maguire
- Mark Williams 3–0 Ali Carter
- Matthew Selt 3–0 Mark Selby
- Ronnie O'Sullivan 3–2 Stephen Maguire
- Judd Trump 3–0 Mark Williams
- Ali Carter 3–1 Mark Selby
- Matthew Selt 0–3 Mark Williams
- Stephen Maguire 3–2 Mark Selby
- Ronnie O'Sullivan 3–2 Matthew Selt
- Judd Trump 3–1 Ali Carter
- Stephen Maguire 1–3 Matthew Selt
- Mark Williams 0–3 Mark Selby
- Ronnie O'Sullivan 3–2 Ali Carter
- Judd Trump 2–3 Mark Selby
- Stephen Maguire 2–3 Ali Carter
- Judd Trump 2–3 Matthew Selt
- Ronnie O'Sullivan 0–3 Mark Williams

=== Table ===
Pos	Player	Pld	W	L	FF	FA	FD	
1	Ronnie O'Sullivan (ENG)	6	5	1	15	11	+4	Qualification to the Winners' group play-off
2	Mark Williams (WAL)	6	4	2	12	8	+4	Qualification to the Winners' group play-off
3	Judd Trump (ENG)	6	3	3	13	11	+2	Qualification to the Winners' group play-off
4	Matthew Selt (ENG)	6	3	3	12	12	0	Qualification to the Winners' group play-off
5	Ali Carter (ENG)	6	3	3	12	13	−1	Eliminated from the competition
6	Mark Selby (ENG)	6	2	4	11	14	−3	Eliminated from the competition
7	Stephen Maguire (SCO)	6	1	5	11	17	−6	Eliminated from the competition

=== Play-offs ===
Semi-finals; Best of 5 frames
Ronnie O'Sullivan (ENG)	3
Matthew Selt (ENG)	0
Mark Williams (WAL)	2
Judd Trump (ENG)	3

Final; Best of 5 frames
Ronnie O'Sullivan (ENG)	2
Judd Trump (ENG)	3

== Century breaks ==
Total: 96

- **147** (6) – Fergal O'Brien
- **144** (2), 137, 131, 130, 129, 119, 114, 111, 110, 108, 105, 103, 102, 100, 100 – Mark Williams
- **141** (W), 121, 120, 112 – Matthew Selt
- **140** (4), 131, 117, 103 – Neil Robertson
- **140** (7), 101 – Stuart Bingham
- **139** (3), 138, 112, 110, 108, 102 – Stephen Maguire
- **138** (1), 133, 107, 106, 102 – Ricky Walden
- 136, 135, 134, 133, **131** (5), 129, 129, 123, 123, 123, 119, 116, 111, 107, 101, 101, 100 – Mark Selby
- 136, 134, 133, 126, 120, 119, 117, 115, 106 – Ronnie O'Sullivan
- 134, 103 – Mark Davis
- 134, 103 – Dominic Dale
- 133, 129, 107, 101 – Liang Wenbo
- 131, 110 – Robert Milkins
- 129 – Graeme Dott
- 126, 122 – Marco Fu
- 123, 122, 103, 100, 100 – Ali Carter
- 117, 117 – Michael White
- 111, 106, 102, 100, 100 – Kyren Wilson
- 110, 105 – Ryan Day
- 105 – Martin Gould
- 104 – Ben Woollaston
- 103, 103, 102 – Judd Trump
- 101 – David Gilbert

Bold: highest break in the indicated group.

== Winnings ==
No.	Player	1	2	3	4	5	6	7	W	TOTAL
1	Mark Williams (WAL)	2,800	**5,200**	1,200	6,500				6,000	21,700
2	Mark Selby (ENG)		2,800	5,000	4,500	**6,900**			2,200	21,400
3	Judd Trump (ENG)		6,000						14,400	20,400
4	Ronnie O'Sullivan (ENG)	6,600							9,500	16,100
5	Matthew Selt (ENG)							6,200	**6,400**	12,600
6	Stephen Maguire (SCO)			**7,000**					2,200	9,200
7	Ali Carter (ENG)						6,500		2,400	8,900
8	Kyren Wilson (ENG)					4,600	1,200	2,900		8,700
9	Mark Davis (ENG)					2,900	2,300	2,700		7,900
10	Ricky Walden (ENG)	**2,600**	1,000	2,100	1,100	800				7,600
11	Dominic Dale (WAL)						4,700	900		5,600
12	Michael Holt (ENG)					2,100	2,400	800		5,300
13	Robert Milkins (ENG)	4,200	900							5,100
14	Liang Wenbo (CHN)							5,000		5,000
15	Graeme Dott (SCO)				2,700	1,000				3,700
16	Neil Robertson (AUS)				**3,300**					3,300
=	Michael White (WAL)			2,400	900					3,300
=	Joe Perry (ENG)		2,300	1,000						3,300
19	Barry Hawkins (ENG)	1,200	800							2,000
20	Stuart Bingham (ENG)							**1,700**		1,700
21	Fergal O'Brien (IRL)						**1,500**			1,500
22	Ryan Day (WAL)	1,200								1,200
23	Martin Gould (ENG)						1,100			1,100
24	David Gilbert (ENG)					1,000				1,000
25	John Higgins (SCO)	900								900
26	Marco Fu (HKG)			600						600
=	Ben Woollaston (ENG)				600					600
	Total prize money	19,500	19,000	19,300	19,600	19,300	19,700	20,200	43,100	179,700

Green: Won the group. Bold: Highest break in the group. All prize money in GBP.
