= 2017 Championship League =

Championship League
Tournament information
- Dates: 2 January – 2 March 2017
- Venue: Ricoh Arena
- City: Coventry
- Country: England
- Format: Non-ranking event
- Total prize fund: £181,800
- Winner's share: £10,000 (plus bonuses)
- Highest break: Mark Davis (ENG) (147)x2

Final
- Champion: John Higgins (SCO)
- Runner-up: Ryan Day (WAL)
- Score: 3–0

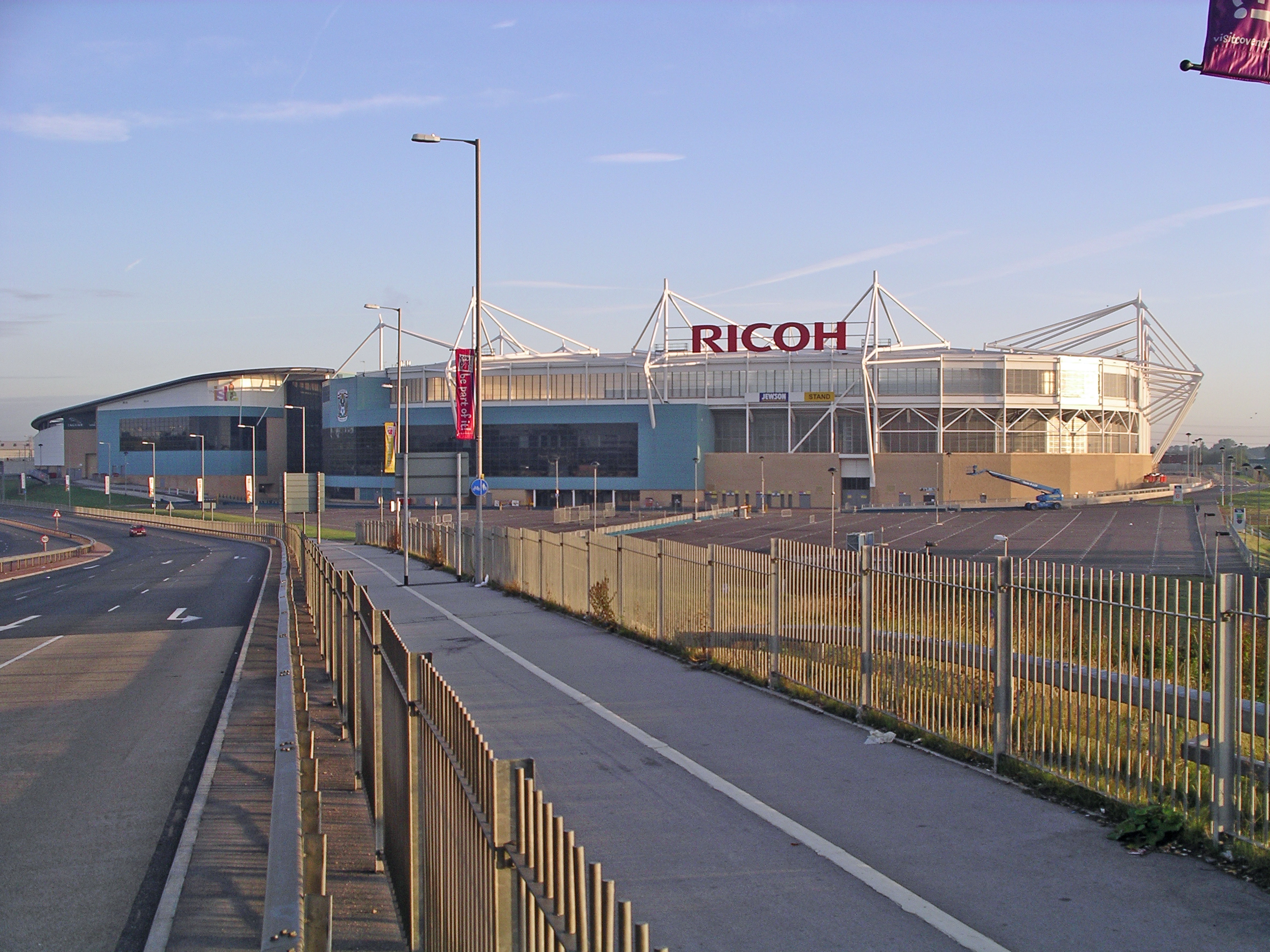
Ricoh Arena (Coventry)

The 2017 Championship League was a professional non-ranking snooker tournament that took place from 2 January to 2 March 2017 at the Ricoh Arena in Coventry, England.

Judd Trump was the defending champion, and he made it to the semi-finals, where he lost 2–3 to John Higgins.

The Scotsman then won the final, clinching his first Championship League title with a 3–0 win over Ryan Day. The Welshman took the largest share of the prize money thanks to a lucrative campaign through six groups before qualifying for the winners' group.

Mark Davis made the 127th official maximum break in the deciding 5th frame of his group 3 final against Neil Robertson. This was Davis' first official 147 break and the ninth of the 2016/2017 season. Davis also became the oldest player to make an official 147, at the age of 44. He surpassed the record set by Fergal O'Brien, who scored the first maximum of his career at the age of 43 in a Championship League round robin match against Davis in the previous season. Later on, Davis made the 129th official maximum break in the deciding 5th frame of his Winners' Group round robin match against John Higgins. It was Davis' second official 147 break and the eleventh of the 2016/2017 season. With that, Davis became the first player to make two maximum breaks in a tournament. It was the fourth consecutive year that a maximum was made in the Championship League.

== Prize fund ==
The breakdown of prize money for this year is shown below.

- Group 1–7
  - Winner: £3,000
  - Runner-up: £2,000
  - Semi-final: £1,000
  - Frame-win (league stage): £100
  - Frame-win (play-offs): £300
  - Highest break: £500
- Winners' group
  - Winner: £10,000
  - Runner-up: £5,000
  - Semi-final: £3,000
  - Frame-win (league stage): £200
  - Frame-win (play-offs): £300
  - Highest break: £1,000
- Tournament total: £181,800

== Group 1 ==
Group 1 was played on 2 and 3 January 2017. David Gilbert was the first player to qualify for the winners group.

=== Matches ===
- Anthony McGill 2–3 David Gilbert
- Ryan Day 1–3 Matthew Selt
- Ben Woollaston 0–3 Anthony McGill
- Mark Davis 2–3 Robert Milkins
- David Gilbert 0–3 Ryan Day
- Mark Davis 3–1 Matthew Selt
- Robert Milkins 2–3 Ben Woollaston
- Anthony McGill 3–1 Ryan Day
- David Gilbert 3–1 Matthew Selt
- Mark Davis 1–3 Ben Woollaston
- Robert Milkins 1–3 Matthew Selt
- Ryan Day 3–1 Ben Woollaston
- Anthony McGill 3–1 Robert Milkins
- David Gilbert 2–3 Mark Davis
- Ryan Day 3–1 Robert Milkins
- Matthew Selt 3–2 Ben Woollaston
- Anthony McGill 1–3 Mark Davis
- David Gilbert 3–2 Ben Woollaston
- Ryan Day 2–3 Mark Davis
- David Gilbert 3–0 Robert Milkins
- Anthony McGill 3–2 Matthew Selt

=== Table ===
| Pos | Player | Pld | W | L | FF | FA | FD | |
|---|---|---|---|---|---|---|---|---|
| 1 | Anthony McGill (SCO) | 6 | 4 | 2 | 15 | 10 | +5 | Qualification to Group 1 play-off |
| 2 | Mark Davis (ENG) | 6 | 4 | 2 | 15 | 12 | +3 | Qualification to Group 1 play-off |
| 3 | David Gilbert (ENG) | 6 | 4 | 2 | 14 | 11 | +3 | Qualification to Group 1 play-off |
| 4 | Ryan Day (WAL) | 6 | 3 | 3 | 13 | 11 | +2 | Qualification to Group 1 play-off |
| 5 | Matthew Selt (ENG) | 6 | 3 | 3 | 13 | 13 | 0 | Advances into Group 2 |
| 6 | Ben Woollaston (ENG) | 6 | 2 | 4 | 11 | 15 | −4 | Eliminated from the competition |
| 7 | Robert Milkins (ENG) | 6 | 1 | 5 | 8 | 17 | −9 | Eliminated from the competition |

=== Play-offs ===
Semi-finals; Best of 5 frames
Anthony McGill (SCO) | 2
Ryan Day (WAL) | 3
Mark Davis (ENG) | 1
David Gilbert (ENG) | 3

Final; Best of 5 frames
Ryan Day (WAL) | 2
David Gilbert (ENG) | 3

== Group 2 ==
Group 2 was played on 4 and 5 January 2017. Anthony McGill was the second player to qualify for the winners group.

=== Matches ===
- Mark Williams 1–3 Neil Robertson
- Michael White 1–3 Matthew Selt
- Anthony McGill 3–0 Mark Williams
- Mark Davis 2–3 Ryan Day
- Neil Robertson 3–1 Michael White
- Matthew Selt 0–3 Mark Davis
- Ryan Day 3–1 Anthony McGill
- Mark Williams 3–0 Michael White
- Neil Robertson 1–3 Matthew Selt
- Mark Davis 3–1 Anthony McGill
- Ryan Day 3–0 Matthew Selt
- Michael White 2–3 Anthony McGill
- Mark Williams 1–3 Ryan Day
- Neil Robertson 3–2 Mark Davis
- Michael White 3–2 Ryan Day
- Matthew Selt 2–3 Anthony McGill
- Mark Williams 2–3 Mark Davis
- Neil Robertson 3–2 Anthony McGill
- Michael White 2–3 Mark Davis
- Neil Robertson 3–1 Ryan Day
- Mark Williams 3–1 Matthew Selt

=== Table ===
| Pos | Player | Pld | W | L | FF | FA | FD | |
|---|---|---|---|---|---|---|---|---|
| 1 | Neil Robertson (AUS) | 6 | 5 | 1 | 16 | 10 | +6 | Qualification to Group 2 play-off |
| 2 | Mark Davis (ENG) | 6 | 4 | 2 | 16 | 11 | +5 | Qualification to Group 2 play-off |
| 3 | Ryan Day (WAL) | 6 | 4 | 2 | 15 | 10 | +5 | Qualification to Group 2 play-off |
| 4 | Anthony McGill (SCO) | 6 | 3 | 3 | 13 | 13 | 0 | Qualification to Group 2 play-off |
| 5 | Mark Williams (WAL) | 6 | 2 | 4 | 10 | 13 | −3 | Advances into Group 3 |
| 6 | Matthew Selt (ENG) | 6 | 2 | 4 | 9 | 14 | −5 | Eliminated from the competition |
| 7 | Michael White (WAL) | 6 | 1 | 5 | 9 | 17 | −8 | Eliminated from the competition |

=== Play-offs ===
Semi-finals; Best of 5 frames
Neil Robertson (AUS) | 1
Anthony McGill (SCO) | 3
Mark Davis (ENG) | 2
Ryan Day (WAL) | 3

Final; Best of 5 frames
Anthony McGill (SCO) | 3
Ryan Day (WAL) | 0

== Group 3 ==
Group 3 was played on 9 and 10 January 2017. Mark Davis was the third player to qualify for the winners group, finishing with a maximum break in the fifth frame decider against Neil Robertson in the group play-off final.

=== Matches ===
- Joe Perry 2–3 Barry Hawkins
- Ali Carter 3–1 Mark Williams
- Neil Robertson 3–1 Joe Perry
- Mark Davis 2–3 Ryan Day
- Barry Hawkins 3–0 Ali Carter
- Mark Williams 0–3 Mark Davis
- Ryan Day 3–2 Neil Robertson
- Joe Perry 0–3 Ali Carter
- Barry Hawkins 0–3 Mark Williams
- Mark Davis 3–2 Neil Robertson
- Ryan Day 2–3 Mark Williams
- Ali Carter 0–3 Neil Robertson
- Joe Perry 1–3 Ryan Day
- Barry Hawkins 3–1 Mark Davis
- Ali Carter 2–3 Ryan Day
- Mark Williams 2–3 Neil Robertson
- Joe Perry 1–3 Mark Davis
- Barry Hawkins 0–3 Neil Robertson
- Ali Carter 0–3 Mark Davis
- Barry Hawkins 3–1 Ryan Day
- Joe Perry 3–1 Mark Williams

=== Table ===
| Pos | Player | Pld | W | L | FF | FA | FD | |
|---|---|---|---|---|---|---|---|---|
| 1 | Neil Robertson (AUS) | 6 | 4 | 2 | 16 | 9 | +7 | Qualification to Group 3 play-off |
| 2 | Mark Davis (ENG) | 6 | 4 | 2 | 15 | 9 | +6 | Qualification to Group 3 play-off |
| 3 | Ryan Day (WAL) | 6 | 4 | 2 | 15 | 13 | +2 | Qualification to Group 3 play-off |
| 4 | Barry Hawkins (ENG) | 6 | 4 | 2 | 12 | 10 | +2 | Qualification to Group 3 play-off |
| 5 | Mark Williams (WAL) | 6 | 2 | 4 | 10 | 14 | −4 | Advances into Group 4 |
| 6 | Ali Carter (ENG) | 6 | 2 | 4 | 8 | 13 | −5 | Eliminated from the competition |
| 7 | Joe Perry (ENG) | 6 | 1 | 5 | 8 | 16 | −8 | Eliminated from the competition |

=== Play-offs ===
Semi-finals; Best of 5 frames
Neil Robertson (AUS) | 3
Barry Hawkins (ENG) | 1
Mark Davis (ENG) | 3
Ryan Day (WAL) | 2

Final; Best of 5 frames
Neil Robertson (AUS) | 2
Mark Davis (ENG) | 3

== Group 4 ==
Group 4 was played on 11 and 12 January 2017. Barry Hawkins was the fourth player to qualify for the winners group.

=== Matches ===
- Shaun Murphy 3–2 Mark Allen
- Kyren Wilson 0–3 Mark Williams
- Barry Hawkins 3–1 Shaun Murphy
- Ryan Day 3–2 Neil Robertson
- Mark Allen 1–3 Kyren Wilson
- Mark Williams 3–1 Ryan Day
- Neil Robertson 2–3 Barry Hawkins
- Shaun Murphy 3–1 Kyren Wilson
- Mark Allen 1–3 Mark Williams
- Barry Hawkins 1–3 Ryan Day
- Neil Robertson 3–1 Mark Williams
- Kyren Wilson 0–3 Barry Hawkins
- Shaun Murphy 1–3 Neil Robertson
- Mark Allen 0–3 Ryan Day
- Kyren Wilson 3–2 Neil Robertson
- Mark Williams 1–3 Barry Hawkins
- Shaun Murphy 3–0 Ryan Day
- Mark Allen 1–3 Barry Hawkins
- Kyren Wilson 3–2 Ryan Day
- Mark Allen 3–1 Neil Robertson
- Shaun Murphy 2–3 Mark Williams

=== Table ===
| Pos | Player | Pld | W | L | FF | FA | FD | |
|---|---|---|---|---|---|---|---|---|
| 1 | Barry Hawkins (ENG) | 6 | 5 | 1 | 16 | 8 | +8 | Qualification to Group 4 play-off |
| 2 | Mark Williams (WAL) | 6 | 4 | 2 | 14 | 10 | +4 | Qualification to Group 4 play-off |
| 3 | Shaun Murphy (ENG) | 6 | 3 | 3 | 13 | 12 | +1 | Qualification to Group 4 play-off |
| 4 | Ryan Day (WAL) | 6 | 3 | 3 | 12 | 12 | 0 | Qualification to Group 4 play-off |
| 5 | Kyren Wilson (ENG) | 6 | 3 | 3 | 10 | 14 | −4 | Advances into Group 5 |
| 6 | Neil Robertson (AUS) | 6 | 2 | 4 | 13 | 14 | −1 | Eliminated from the competition |
| 7 | Mark Allen (NIR) | 6 | 1 | 5 | 8 | 16 | −8 | Eliminated from the competition |

=== Play-offs ===
Semi-finals; Best of 5 frames
Barry Hawkins (ENG) | 3
Ryan Day (WAL) | 2
Mark Williams (WAL) | 3
Shaun Murphy (ENG) | 0

Final; Best of 5 frames
Barry Hawkins (ENG) | 3
Mark Williams (WAL) | 0

== Group 5 ==
Group 5 was played on 20 and 21 February 2017. Judd Trump was the fifth player to qualify for the winners group.

=== Matches ===
- Stuart Bingham 2–3 Judd Trump
- Liang Wenbo 3–1 Kyren Wilson
- Ryan Day 0–3 Stuart Bingham
- Shaun Murphy 2–3 Mark Williams
- Judd Trump 3–2 Liang Wenbo
- Kyren Wilson 2–3 Shaun Murphy
- Mark Williams 2–3 Ryan Day
- Stuart Bingham 3–1 Liang Wenbo
- Judd Trump 3–0 Kyren Wilson
- Shaun Murphy 1–3 Ryan Day
- Mark Williams 3–1 Kyren Wilson
- Liang Wenbo 0–3 Ryan Day
- Stuart Bingham 2–3 Mark Williams
- Judd Trump 3–2 Shaun Murphy
- Liang Wenbo 1–3 Mark Williams
- Kyren Wilson 3–0 Ryan Day
- Stuart Bingham 1–3 Shaun Murphy
- Judd Trump 3–1 Ryan Day
- Liang Wenbo 0–3 Shaun Murphy
- Judd Trump 3–2 Mark Williams
- Stuart Bingham 0–3 Kyren Wilson

=== Table ===
| Pos | Player | Pld | W | L | FF | FA | FD | |
|---|---|---|---|---|---|---|---|---|
| 1 | Judd Trump (ENG) | 6 | 6 | 0 | 18 | 9 | +9 | Qualification to Group 5 play-off |
| 2 | Mark Williams (WAL) | 6 | 4 | 2 | 16 | 12 | +4 | Qualification to Group 5 play-off |
| 3 | Shaun Murphy (ENG) | 6 | 3 | 3 | 14 | 12 | +2 | Qualification to Group 5 play-off |
| 4 | Ryan Day (WAL) | 6 | 3 | 3 | 10 | 12 | −2 | Qualification to Group 5 play-off |
| 5 | Stuart Bingham (ENG) | 6 | 2 | 4 | 11 | 13 | −2 | Advances into Group 6 |
| 6 | Kyren Wilson (ENG) | 6 | 2 | 4 | 10 | 12 | −2 | Eliminated from the competition |
| 7 | Liang Wenbo (CHN) | 6 | 1 | 5 | 7 | 16 | −9 | Eliminated from the competition |

=== Play-offs ===
Semi-finals; Best of 5 frames
Judd Trump (ENG) | 3
Ryan Day (WAL) | 0
Mark Williams (WAL) | 3
Shaun Murphy (ENG) | 0

Final; Best of 5 frames
Judd Trump (ENG) | 3
Mark Williams (WAL) | 0

== Group 6 ==
Group 6 was played on 22 and 23 February 2017. Ryan Day was the sixth player to qualify for the winners group. It was also his sixth try, as he had been part of the tournament since the first group was played out.

=== Matches ===
- Mark Selby 1–3 Ricky Walden
- Martin Gould 3–2 Stuart Bingham
- Ryan Day 0–3 Mark Selby
- Shaun Murphy 3–2 Mark Williams
- Ricky Walden 3–2 Martin Gould
- Stuart Bingham 3–1 Shaun Murphy
- Mark Williams 3–2 Ryan Day
- Mark Selby 0–3 Martin Gould
- Ricky Walden 2–3 Stuart Bingham
- Shaun Murphy 0–3 Ryan Day
- Mark Williams 0–3 Stuart Bingham
- Martin Gould 1–3 Ryan Day
- Mark Selby 2–3 Mark Williams
- Ricky Walden 0–3 Shaun Murphy
- Martin Gould 3–2 Mark Williams
- Stuart Bingham 1–3 Ryan Day
- Mark Selby 3–0 Shaun Murphy
- Ricky Walden 3–2 Ryan Day
- Martin Gould 3–1 Shaun Murphy
- Ricky Walden 3–1 Mark Williams
- Mark Selby 3–1 Stuart Bingham

=== Table ===
| Pos | Player | Pld | W | L | FF | FA | FD | |
|---|---|---|---|---|---|---|---|---|
| 1 | Martin Gould (ENG) | 6 | 4 | 2 | 15 | 11 | +4 | Qualification to Group 6 play-off |
| 2 | Ricky Walden (ENG) | 6 | 4 | 2 | 14 | 12 | +2 | Qualification to Group 6 play-off |
| 3 | Ryan Day (WAL) | 6 | 3 | 3 | 13 | 11 | +2 | Qualification to Group 6 play-off |
| 4 | Stuart Bingham (ENG) | 6 | 3 | 3 | 13 | 12 | +1 | Qualification to Group 6 play-off |
| 5 | Mark Selby (ENG) | 6 | 3 | 3 | 12 | 10 | +2 | Advances into Group 7 |
| 6 | Mark Williams (WAL) | 6 | 2 | 4 | 11 | 16 | −5 | Eliminated from the competition |
| 7 | Shaun Murphy (ENG) | 6 | 2 | 4 | 8 | 14 | −6 | Eliminated from the competition |

=== Play-offs ===
Semi-finals; Best of 5 frames
Martin Gould (ENG) | 3
Stuart Bingham (ENG) | 1
Ricky Walden (ENG) | 2
Ryan Day (WAL) | 3

Final; Best of 5 frames
Martin Gould (ENG) | 1
Ryan Day (WAL) | 3

== Group 7 ==
Group 7 was played on 27 and 28 February 2017. John Higgins was the seventh and final player to qualify for the winners group.

=== Matches ===
- John Higgins 3–2 Michael Holt
- Graeme Dott 1–3 Mark Selby
- Stuart Bingham 3–2 John Higgins
- Ricky Walden 2–3 Martin Gould
- Michael Holt 3–2 Graeme Dott
- Mark Selby 3–0 Ricky Walden
- Martin Gould 0–3 Stuart Bingham
- John Higgins 3–2 Graeme Dott
- Michael Holt 3–1 Mark Selby
- Ricky Walden 2–3 Stuart Bingham
- Martin Gould 3–1 Mark Selby
- Graeme Dott 0–3 Stuart Bingham
- John Higgins 3–1 Martin Gould
- Michael Holt 2–3 Ricky Walden
- Graeme Dott 3–0 Martin Gould
- Mark Selby 0–3 Stuart Bingham
- John Higgins 3–1 Ricky Walden
- Michael Holt 0–3 Stuart Bingham
- Graeme Dott 1–3 Ricky Walden
- Michael Holt 3–1 Martin Gould
- John Higgins 1–3 Mark Selby

=== Table ===
| Pos | Player | Pld | W | L | FF | FA | FD | |
|---|---|---|---|---|---|---|---|---|
| 1 | Stuart Bingham (ENG) | 6 | 6 | 0 | 18 | 4 | +14 | Qualification to Group 7 play-off |
| 2 | John Higgins (SCO) | 6 | 4 | 2 | 15 | 12 | +3 | Qualification to Group 7 play-off |
| 3 | Michael Holt (ENG) | 6 | 3 | 3 | 13 | 13 | 0 | Qualification to Group 7 play-off |
| 4 | Mark Selby (ENG) | 6 | 3 | 3 | 11 | 11 | 0 | Qualification to Group 7 play-off |
| 5 | Ricky Walden (ENG) | 6 | 2 | 4 | 11 | 15 | −4 | Eliminated from the competition |
| 6 | Martin Gould (ENG) | 6 | 2 | 4 | 8 | 15 | −7 | Eliminated from the competition |
| 7 | Graeme Dott (SCO) | 6 | 1 | 5 | 9 | 15 | −6 | Eliminated from the competition |

=== Play-offs ===
Semi-finals; Best of 5 frames
Stuart Bingham (ENG) | 2
Mark Selby (ENG) | 3
John Higgins (SCO) | 3
Michael Holt (ENG) | 2

Final; Best of 5 frames
Mark Selby (ENG) | 0
John Higgins (SCO) | 3

== Winners' Group ==
The Winners' Group was played on 1 and 2 March 2017. In the final, John Higgins defeated Ryan Day 3–0 to win the Championship League title for the first time in his career.

=== Matches ===
- David Gilbert 3–0 Anthony McGill
- Mark Davis 1–3 Barry Hawkins
- Judd Trump 3–0 David Gilbert
- Ryan Day 3–2 John Higgins
- Anthony McGill 0–3 Mark Davis
- Barry Hawkins 3–2 Ryan Day
- John Higgins 3–1 Judd Trump
- David Gilbert 1–3 Mark Davis
- Anthony McGill 3–1 Barry Hawkins
- Ryan Day 1–3 Judd Trump
- John Higgins 1–3 Barry Hawkins
- Mark Davis 1–3 Judd Trump
- David Gilbert 0–3 John Higgins
- Anthony McGill 1–3 Ryan Day
- Mark Davis 3–2 John Higgins
- Barry Hawkins 2–3 Judd Trump
- David Gilbert 2–3 Ryan Day
- Anthony McGill 1–3 Judd Trump
- Mark Davis 1–3 Ryan Day
- Anthony McGill 2–3 John Higgins
- David Gilbert 1–3 Barry Hawkins

=== Table ===
| Pos | Player | Pld | W | L | FF | FA | FD | |
|---|---|---|---|---|---|---|---|---|
| 1 | Judd Trump (ENG) | 6 | 5 | 1 | 16 | 8 | +8 | Qualification to the Winners' Group play-off |
| 2 | Barry Hawkins (ENG) | 6 | 4 | 2 | 15 | 11 | +4 | Qualification to the Winners' Group play-off |
| 3 | Ryan Day (WAL) | 6 | 4 | 2 | 15 | 12 | +3 | Qualification to the Winners' Group play-off |
| 4 | John Higgins (SCO) | 6 | 3 | 3 | 14 | 12 | +2 | Qualification to the Winners' Group play-off |
| 5 | Mark Davis (ENG) | 6 | 3 | 3 | 12 | 12 | 0 | Eliminated from the competition |
| 6 | David Gilbert (ENG) | 6 | 1 | 5 | 7 | 15 | −8 | Eliminated from the competition |
| 7 | Anthony McGill (SCO) | 6 | 1 | 5 | 7 | 16 | −9 | Eliminated from the competition |

Source: championshipleaguesnooker.co.uk

=== Play-offs ===
Semi-finals; Best of 5 frames
Judd Trump (ENG) | 2
John Higgins (SCO) | 3
Barry Hawkins (ENG) | 2
Ryan Day (WAL) | 3

Final; Best of 5 frames
John Higgins (SCO) | 3
Ryan Day (WAL) | 0

== Century breaks ==
Total: 112

- **147** (W), **147** (3), 142, 132, 130, 110 – Mark Davis
- **144** (7), 108 – Graeme Dott
- 143, **142** (5), **140** (4), **136** (2), 121, 118, 106, 105 – Mark Williams
- 143, 138, 137, 123, 120, 116 – John Higgins
- **142** (6), 137, 105, 102 – Ricky Walden
- 141, 126, 106, 102 – Shaun Murphy
- 140, 133, 131, 114, 113, 112, 111, 106, 105, 101, 101, 100, 100 – Judd Trump
- 138, 119, 119, 115 – Martin Gould
- 137, 137, 136, **135** (1), 129, 124, 123, 120, 117, 117, 117, 116, 114, 112, 104, 103, 101 – Ryan Day
- 135, 130, 128, 127, 119, 117, 105, 104, 103, 102, 100, 100, 100 – Neil Robertson
- 131, 126, 118, 101 – Mark Selby
- 130, 123, 114, 112, 112, 110, 107, 101 – Stuart Bingham
- 130 – Joe Perry
- 122, 108, 107 – Anthony McGill
- 121, 114, 112, 105, 102 – David Gilbert
- 117, 111, 107, 107, 105, 103, 101 – Barry Hawkins
- 115 – Liang Wenbo
- 115 – Matthew Selt
- 113 – Ali Carter
- 112, 107 – Kyren Wilson
- 103 – Mark Allen
- 100 – Michael White

Bold: highest break in the indicated group.

== Winnings ==
| No. | Player | 1 | 2 | 3 | 4 | 5 | 6 | 7 | W | TOTAL |
|---|---|---|---|---|---|---|---|---|---|---|
| 1 | Ryan Day (WAL) | **5,300** | 4,400 | 3,100 | 2,800 | 2,000 | 6,100 | | 8,900 | 32,600 |
| 2 | John Higgins (SCO) | | | | | | | 6,300 | 14,600 | 20,900 |
| 3 | Mark Davis (ENG) | 2,800 | 3,200 | **6,800** | | | | | **3,400** | 16,200 |
| 4 | Barry Hawkins (ENG) | | | 2,500 | 6,400 | | | | 6,600 | 15,500 |
| 5 | Judd Trump (ENG) | | | | | 6,600 | | | 6,800 | 13,400 |
| = | Mark Williams (WAL) | | **1,500** | 1,000 | **4,800** | **5,000** | 1,100 | | | 13,400 |
| 7 | Anthony McGill (SCO) | 3,100 | 6,100 | | | | | | 1,400 | 10,600 |
| 8 | Neil Robertson (AUS) | | 2,900 | 5,100 | 1,300 | | | | | 9,300 |
| 9 | David Gilbert (ENG) | 6,200 | | | | | | | 1,400 | 7,600 |
| 10 | Stuart Bingham (ENG) | | | | | 1,100 | 2,600 | 3,400 | | 7,100 |
| 11 | Shaun Murphy (ENG) | | | | 2,300 | 2,400 | 800 | | | 5,500 |
| = | Martin Gould (ENG) | | | | | | 4,700 | 800 | | 5,500 |
| 13 | Mark Selby (ENG) | | | | | | 1,200 | 4,000 | | 5,200 |
| 14 | Ricky Walden (ENG) | | | | | | **3,500** | 1,100 | | 4,600 |
| 15 | Michael Holt (ENG) | | | | | | | 2,900 | | 2,900 |
| 16 | Matthew Selt (ENG) | 1,300 | 900 | | | | | | | 2,200 |
| 17 | Kyren Wilson (ENG) | | | | 1,000 | 1,000 | | | | 2,000 |
| 18 | Graeme Dott (SCO) | | | | | | | **1,400** | | 1,400 |
| 19 | Ben Woollaston (ENG) | 1,100 | | | | | | | | 1,100 |
| 20 | Michael White (WAL) | | 900 | | | | | | | 900 |
| 21 | Robert Milkins (ENG) | 800 | | | | | | | | 800 |
| = | Ali Carter (ENG) | | | 800 | | | | | | 800 |
| = | Joe Perry (ENG) | | | 800 | | | | | | 800 |
| = | Mark Allen (NIR) | | | | 800 | | | | | 800 |
| 25 | Liang Wenbo (CHN) | | | | | 700 | | | | 700 |
| | Total prize money | 20,600 | 19,900 | 20,100 | 19,400 | 18,800 | 20,000 | 19,900 | 43,100 | 181,800 |

Green: Won the group. Bold: Highest break in the group. All prize money in GBP.
