= 2018 Championship League =

Championship League
Tournament information
- Dates: 2 January – 29 March 2018
- Venue: Ricoh Arena
- City: Coventry
- Country: England
- Format: Non-ranking event
- Total prize fund: £180,300
- Winner's share: £10,000 (plus bonuses)
- Highest break: Martin Gould (ENG) (147); Luca Brecel (BEL) (147)

Final
- Champion: John Higgins (SCO)
- Runner-up: Zhou Yuelong (CHN)
- Score: 3–2

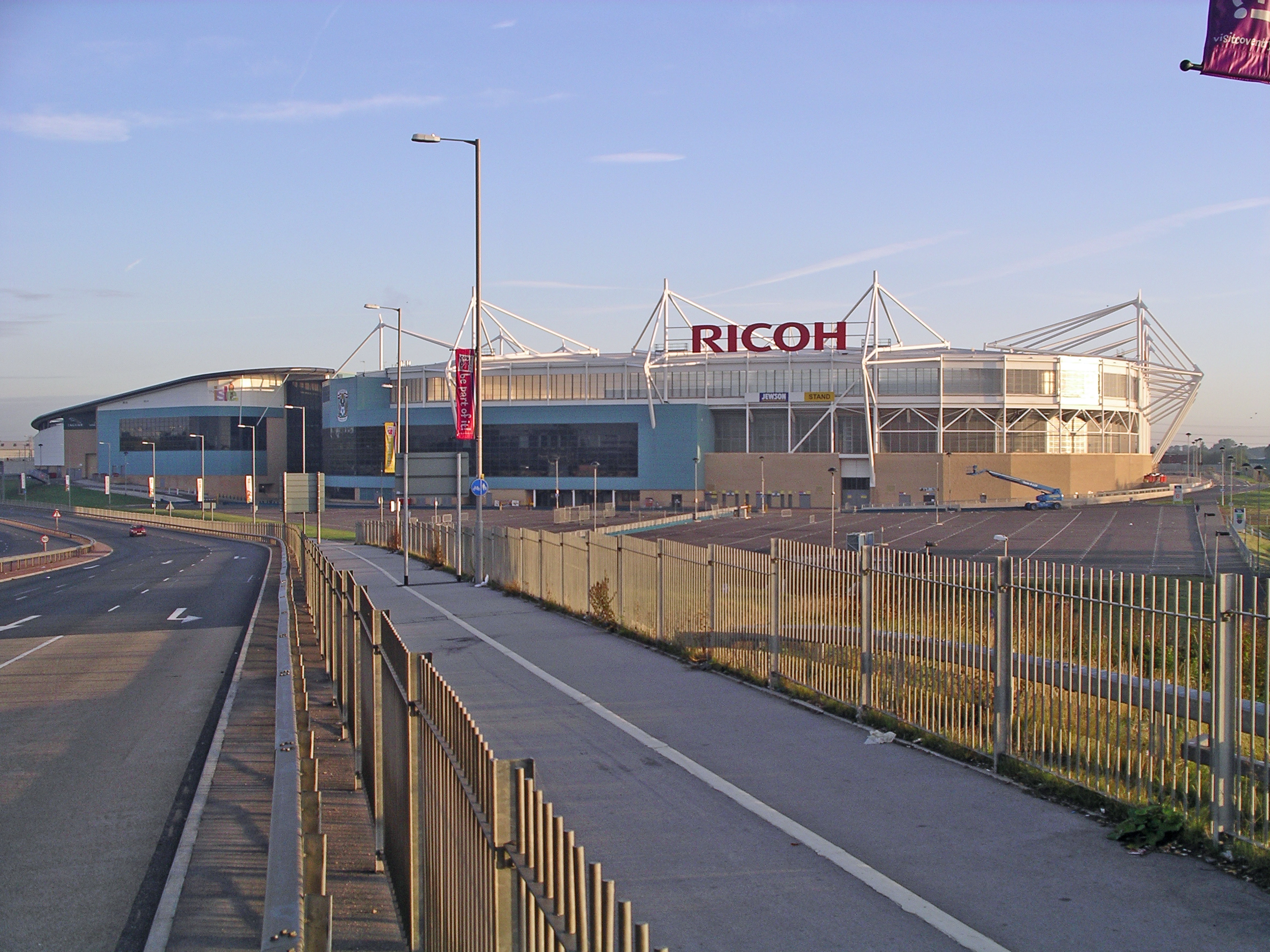
Ricoh Arena (Coventry)

The 2018 Championship League was a professional non-ranking snooker tournament taking place from 2 January to 29 March 2018. It was the 11th staging of the tournament.

The defending champion John Higgins retained his title with a 3–2 final win over Zhou Yuelong. As in the previous edition of the tournament Higgins had entered the competition in Group 7 and from there won his way through to the Winners' Group.

Martin Gould and Luca Brecel both made their maiden official maximum breaks in this tournament. Gould achieved his maximum in the deciding frame of his Group 6 round robin match against Li Hang. Brecel achieved his in the third frame of a 3–0 whitewash of defending champion John Higgins in their Group 7 round robin match. These were the 135th and 136th official maximum breaks and the fourth and fifth of the 2017/2018 season. It was the fifth consecutive year that a maximum was made in the Championship League, and the second consecutive year that two were made.

== Prize fund ==
The breakdown of prize money for the 2018 Championship League is shown below.

Group 1–7

- Winner: £3,000
- Runner-up: £2,000
- Semi-final: £1,000
- Frame-win (league stage): £100
- Frame-win (play-offs): £300
- Highest break: £500

Winners' Group

- Winner: £10,000
- Runner-up: £5,000
- Semi-final: £3,000
- Frame-win (league stage): £200
- Frame-win (play-offs): £300
- Highest break: £1,000
- Tournament total: £180,300

== Group 1 ==
Group 1 was played on 2 and 3 January 2018. Zhou Yuelong was the first player to qualify for the Winners' Group.

=== Matches ===
- Kyren Wilson 3–1 Stephen Maguire
- Ryan Day 1–3 Zhou Yuelong
- Anthony Hamilton 3–1 Kyren Wilson
- Mark King 2–3 Michael Holt
- Stephen Maguire 3–1 Ryan Day
- Zhou Yuelong 3–2 Mark King
- Michael Holt 1–3 Anthony Hamilton
- Kyren Wilson 1–3 Ryan Day
- Stephen Maguire 3–2 Zhou Yuelong
- Mark King 3–2 Anthony Hamilton
- Michael Holt 1–3 Zhou Yuelong
- Ryan Day 3–1 Anthony Hamilton
- Kyren Wilson 3–1 Michael Holt
- Stephen Maguire 3–2 Mark King
- Ryan Day 1–3 Michael Holt
- Zhou Yuelong 3–0 Anthony Hamilton
- Kyren Wilson 0–3 Mark King
- Stephen Maguire 2–3 Anthony Hamilton
- Ryan Day 3–2 Mark King
- Stephen Maguire 3–1 Michael Holt
- Kyren Wilson 3–0 Zhou Yuelong

=== Table ===
Pos	Player	Pld	W	L	FF	FA	FD	
1	Stephen Maguire (SCO)	6	4	2	15	12	+3	Qualification to Group 1 play-off
2	Zhou Yuelong (CHN)	6	4	2	14	10	+4	Qualification to Group 1 play-off
3	Ryan Day (WAL)	6	3	3	12	13	−1	Qualification to Group 1 play-off
4	Anthony Hamilton (ENG)	6	3	3	12	13	−1	Qualification to Group 1 play-off
5	Kyren Wilson (ENG)	6	3	3	11	11	0	Advances into Group 2
6	Mark King (ENG)	6	2	4	14	14	0	Eliminated from the competition
7	Michael Holt (ENG)	6	2	4	10	15	−5	Eliminated from the competition

=== Play-offs ===
Semi-finals; Best of 5 frames
Stephen Maguire (SCO)	2
Anthony Hamilton (ENG)	3
Zhou Yuelong (CHN)	3
Ryan Day (WAL)	2

Final; Best of 5 frames
Anthony Hamilton (ENG)	2
Zhou Yuelong (CHN)	3

== Group 2 ==
Group 2 was played on 4 and 5 January 2018. Mark Selby was the second player to qualify for the Winners' Group, recording his 500th career century in the Group 2 final against Barry Hawkins.

=== Matches ===
- Mark Selby 3–1* Neil Robertson
- Barry Hawkins 3–2 Kyren Wilson
- Stephen Maguire 1–3 Mark Selby
- Ryan Day 3–0 Anthony Hamilton
- Neil Robertson 3–2* Barry Hawkins
- Kyren Wilson 1–3 Ryan Day
- Anthony Hamilton 3–0 Stephen Maguire
- Mark Selby 2–3 Barry Hawkins
- Neil Robertson 3–2* Kyren Wilson
- Ryan Day 1–3 Stephen Maguire
- Anthony Hamilton 1–3 Kyren Wilson
- Barry Hawkins 3–0 Stephen Maguire
- Mark Selby 2–3 Anthony Hamilton
- Neil Robertson 3–0* Ryan Day
- Barry Hawkins 3–1 Anthony Hamilton
- Kyren Wilson 3–0 Stephen Maguire
- Mark Selby 2–3 Ryan Day
- Neil Robertson 2–3* Stephen Maguire
- Barry Hawkins 3–1 Ryan Day
- Neil Robertson w/d–w/o* Anthony Hamilton
- Mark Selby 3–0 Kyren Wilson

Note

* Neil Robertson had to pull out of the Championship League for personal reasons after his fifth match. Results from Robertson's previous matches were removed from the group table.

=== Table ===
Pos	Player	Pld	W	L	FF	FA	FD	
1	Barry Hawkins (ENG)	5	5	0	15	6	+9	Qualification to Group 2 play-off
2	Ryan Day (WAL)	5	3	2	11	9	+2	Qualification to Group 2 play-off
3	Mark Selby (ENG)	5	2	3	12	10	+2	Qualification to Group 2 play-off
4	Kyren Wilson (ENG)	5	2	3	9	10	−1	Qualification to Group 2 play-off
5	Anthony Hamilton (ENG)	5	2	3	8	11	−3	Advances into Group 3
6	Stephen Maguire (SCO)	5	1	4	4	13	−9	Eliminated from the competition
7	Neil Robertson (AUS)	0	0	0	0	0	0	Eliminated from the competition

=== Play-offs ===
Semi-finals; Best of 5 frames
Barry Hawkins (ENG)	3
Kyren Wilson (ENG)	1
Ryan Day (WAL)	0
Mark Selby (ENG)	3

Final; Best of 5 frames
Barry Hawkins (ENG)	1
Mark Selby (ENG)	3

== Group 3 ==
Group 3 was played on 8 and 9 January 2018. Kyren Wilson was the third player to qualify for the Winners' Group.

=== Matches ===
- Tom Ford 1–3 Mark Allen
- Ali Carter 3–2 Anthony Hamilton
- Kyren Wilson 3–2 Tom Ford
- Ryan Day 3–2 Barry Hawkins
- Mark Allen 3–0 Ali Carter
- Anthony Hamilton 3–1 Ryan Day
- Barry Hawkins 3–0 Kyren Wilson
- Tom Ford 0–3 Ali Carter
- Mark Allen 2–3 Anthony Hamilton
- Ryan Day 2–3 Kyren Wilson
- Barry Hawkins 3–2 Anthony Hamilton
- Ali Carter 2–3 Kyren Wilson
- Tom Ford 3–0 Barry Hawkins
- Mark Allen 3–0 Ryan Day
- Ali Carter 0–3 Barry Hawkins
- Anthony Hamilton 1–3 Kyren Wilson
- Tom Ford 3–1 Ryan Day
- Mark Allen 3–1 Kyren Wilson
- Ali Carter 3–2 Ryan Day
- Mark Allen 1–3 Barry Hawkins
- Tom Ford 3–1 Anthony Hamilton

Note

Anthony McGill withdrew before the tournament and was replaced by Tom Ford.

=== Table ===
Pos	Player	Pld	W	L	FF	FA	FD	
1	Mark Allen (NIR)	6	4	2	15	8	+7	Qualification to Group 3 play-off
2	Barry Hawkins (ENG)	6	4	2	14	9	+5	Qualification to Group 3 play-off
3	Kyren Wilson (ENG)	6	4	2	13	13	0	Qualification to Group 3 play-off
4	Tom Ford (ENG)	6	3	3	12	11	+1	Qualification to Group 3 play-off
5	Ali Carter (ENG)	6	3	3	11	13	−2	Advances into Group 4
6	Anthony Hamilton (ENG)	6	2	4	12	15	−3	Eliminated from the competition
7	Ryan Day (WAL)	6	1	5	9	17	−8	Eliminated from the competition

=== Play-offs ===
Semi-finals; Best of 5 frames
Mark Allen (NIR)	3
Tom Ford (ENG)	2
Barry Hawkins (ENG)	1
Kyren Wilson (ENG)	3

Final; Best of 5 frames
Mark Allen (NIR)	1
Kyren Wilson (ENG)	3

== Group 4 ==
Group 4 was played on 10 and 11 January 2018. Ali Carter was the fourth player to qualify for the Winners' Group. On the first day, Judd Trump made his 500th career century in his match against Liang Wenbo.

=== Matches ===
- Shaun Murphy 3–1 Liang Wenbo
- Judd Trump 3–0 Ali Carter
- Tom Ford 2–3 Shaun Murphy
- Barry Hawkins 3–1* Mark Allen
- Liang Wenbo 0–3 Judd Trump
- Ali Carter 0–3 Barry Hawkins
- Mark Allen w/d–w/o* Tom Ford
- Shaun Murphy 0–3 Judd Trump
- Liang Wenbo 3–2 Ali Carter
- Barry Hawkins 3–1 Tom Ford
- Mark Allen w/d–w/o* Ali Carter
- Judd Trump 3–1 Tom Ford
- Shaun Murphy w/o–w/d* Mark Allen
- Liang Wenbo 3–1 Barry Hawkins
- Judd Trump w/o–w/d* Mark Allen
- Ali Carter 3–0 Tom Ford
- Shaun Murphy 2–3 Barry Hawkins
- Liang Wenbo 0–3 Tom Ford
- Judd Trump 1–3 Barry Hawkins
- Liang Wenbo w/o–w/d* Mark Allen
- Shaun Murphy 1–3 Ali Carter

Note

* Mark Allen had to withdraw due to family reasons prior to his second match in the group. The result from Allen's first match in the group was removed from the group table.

=== Table ===
Pos	Player	Pld	W	L	FF	FA	FD	
1	Judd Trump (ENG)	5	4	1	13	4	+9	Qualification to Group 4 play-off
2	Barry Hawkins (ENG)	5	4	1	13	7	+6	Qualification to Group 4 play-off
3	Shaun Murphy (ENG)	5	2	3	9	12	−3	Qualification to Group 4 play-off
4	Ali Carter (ENG)	5	2	3	8	10	−2	Qualification to Group 4 play-off
5	Liang Wenbo (CHN)	5	2	3	7	12	−5	Advances into Group 5
6	Tom Ford (ENG)	5	1	4	7	12	−5	Eliminated from the competition
7	Mark Allen (NIR)	0	0	0	0	0	0	Eliminated from the competition

=== Play-offs ===
Semi-finals; Best of 5 frames
Judd Trump (ENG)	0
Ali Carter (ENG)	3
Barry Hawkins (ENG)	2
Shaun Murphy (ENG)	3

Final; Best of 5 frames
Ali Carter (ENG)	3
Shaun Murphy (ENG)	1

== Group 5 ==
Group 5 was played on 23 and 24 January 2018. Mark Williams was the fifth player to qualify for the Winners' Group.

=== Matches ===
- Martin Gould 3–1 Ricky Walden
- Mark Williams 1–3 Ben Woollaston
- Judd Trump 3–1 Martin Gould
- Joe Perry 1–3 David Gilbert
- Ricky Walden 1–3 Mark Williams
- Ben Woollaston 1–3 Joe Perry
- David Gilbert 0–3 Judd Trump
- Martin Gould 1–3 Mark Williams
- Ricky Walden 3–2 Ben Woollaston
- Joe Perry 1–3 Judd Trump
- David Gilbert 1–3 Ben Woollaston
- Mark Williams 0–3 Judd Trump
- Martin Gould 3–0 David Gilbert
- Ricky Walden 2–3 Joe Perry
- Mark Williams 3–0 David Gilbert
- Ben Woollaston 3–2 Judd Trump
- Martin Gould 3–1 Joe Perry
- Ricky Walden 3–2 Judd Trump
- Mark Williams 3–0 Joe Perry
- Ricky Walden 3–0 David Gilbert
- Martin Gould 1–3 Ben Woollaston

Note

Barry Hawkins, Shaun Murphy and Liang Wenbo withdrew from the tournament and were replaced by Joe Perry, David Gilbert and Ben Woollaston.

=== Table ===
Pos	Player	Pld	W	L	FF	FA	FD	
1	Judd Trump (ENG)	6	4	2	16	8	+8	Qualification to Group 5 play-off
2	Ben Woollaston (ENG)	6	4	2	15	11	+4	Qualification to Group 5 play-off
3	Mark Williams (WAL)	6	4	2	13	8	+5	Qualification to Group 5 play-off
4	Ricky Walden (ENG)	6	3	3	13	13	0	Qualification to Group 5 play-off
5	Martin Gould (ENG)	6	3	3	12	11	+1	Advances into Group 6
6	Joe Perry (ENG)	6	2	4	9	15	−6	Eliminated from the competition
7	David Gilbert (ENG)	6	1	5	4	16	−12	Eliminated from the competition

=== Play-offs ===
Semi-finals; Best of 5 frames
Judd Trump (ENG)	2
Ricky Walden (ENG)	3
Ben Woollaston (ENG)	1
Mark Williams (WAL)	3

Final; Best of 5 frames
Ricky Walden (ENG)	1
Mark Williams (WAL)	3

== Group 6 ==
Group 6 was played on 25 and 26 January 2018. Martin Gould was the sixth player to qualify for the Winners' Group.

=== Matches ===
- Li Hang 3–0 Michael White
- Graeme Dott 3–1 Martin Gould
- Judd Trump 0–3 Li Hang
- Ben Woollaston 1–3 Ricky Walden
- Michael White 2–3 Graeme Dott
- Martin Gould 3–0 Ben Woollaston
- Ricky Walden 0–3 Judd Trump
- Li Hang 3–2 Graeme Dott
- Michael White 1–3 Martin Gould
- Ben Woollaston 1–3 Judd Trump
- Ricky Walden 0–3 Martin Gould
- Graeme Dott 0–3 Judd Trump
- Li Hang 2–3 Ricky Walden
- Michael White 3–0 Ben Woollaston
- Graeme Dott 2–3 Ricky Walden
- Martin Gould 3–2 Judd Trump
- Li Hang 1–3 Ben Woollaston
- Michael White 0–3 Judd Trump
- Graeme Dott 3–2 Ben Woollaston
- Michael White 2–3 Ricky Walden
- Li Hang 2–3 Martin Gould

=== Table ===
Pos	Player	Pld	W	L	FF	FA	FD	
1	Martin Gould (ENG)	6	5	1	16	8	+8	Qualification to Group 6 play-off
2	Judd Trump (ENG)	6	4	2	14	7	+7	Qualification to Group 6 play-off
3	Ricky Walden (ENG)	6	4	2	12	13	−1	Qualification to Group 6 play-off
4	Li Hang (CHN)	6	3	3	14	11	+3	Qualification to Group 6 play-off
5	Graeme Dott (SCO)	6	3	3	13	14	−1	Advances into Group 7
6	Michael White (WAL)	6	1	5	8	15	−7	Eliminated from the competition
7	Ben Woollaston (ENG)	6	1	5	7	16	−9	Eliminated from the competition

=== Play-offs ===
Semi-finals; Best of 5 frames
Martin Gould (ENG)	3
Li Hang (CHN)	2
Judd Trump (ENG)	3
Ricky Walden (ENG)	0

Final; Best of 5 frames
Martin Gould (ENG)	3
Judd Trump (ENG)	0

== Group 7 ==
Group 7 was played on 26 and 27 March 2018. John Higgins was the seventh player to qualify for the Winners' Group.

=== Matches ===
- John Higgins 0–3 Luca Brecel
- Robert Milkins 1–3 Dominic Dale
- Ricky Walden 2–3 John Higgins
- Jimmy Robertson 0–3 Judd Trump
- Luca Brecel 1–3 Robert Milkins
- Dominic Dale 1–3 Jimmy Robertson
- Judd Trump 3–1 Ricky Walden
- John Higgins 3–1 Robert Milkins
- Luca Brecel 0–3 Dominic Dale
- Jimmy Robertson 3–0 Ricky Walden
- Judd Trump 3–2 Dominic Dale
- Robert Milkins 1–3 Ricky Walden
- John Higgins 3–1 Judd Trump
- Luca Brecel 2–3 Jimmy Robertson
- Robert Milkins 1–3 Judd Trump
- Dominic Dale 2–3 Ricky Walden
- John Higgins 2–3 Jimmy Robertson
- Luca Brecel 0–3 Ricky Walden
- Robert Milkins 1–3 Jimmy Robertson
- Luca Brecel 1–3 Judd Trump
- John Higgins 3–0 Dominic Dale

Notes

Graeme Dott and Li Hang withdrew from the tournament prior to Group 7 play. They were replaced by Dominic Dale and Jimmy Robertson.

=== Table ===
Pos	Player	Pld	W	L	FF	FA	FD	
1	Judd Trump (ENG)	6	5	1	16	8	+8	Qualification to Group 7 play-off
2	Jimmy Robertson (ENG)	6	5	1	15	9	+6	Qualification to Group 7 play-off
3	John Higgins (SCO)	6	4	2	14	10	+4	Qualification to Group 7 play-off
4	Ricky Walden (ENG)	6	3	3	12	12	0	Qualification to Group 7 play-off
5	Dominic Dale (WAL)	6	2	4	11	13	−2	Eliminated from the competition
6	Robert Milkins (ENG)	6	1	5	8	16	−8	Eliminated from the competition
7	Luca Brecel (BEL)	6	1	5	7	15	−8	Eliminated from the competition

=== Play-offs ===
Semi-finals; Best of 5 frames
Judd Trump (ENG)	3
Ricky Walden (ENG)	1
Jimmy Robertson (ENG)	1
John Higgins (SCO)	3

Final; Best of 5 frames
Judd Trump (ENG)	2
John Higgins (SCO)	3

== Winners' Group ==
The Winners' Group was played on 28 and 29 March 2018. In the final, John Higgins defeated Zhou Yuelong 3–2 to retain his Championship League title and win it for the second time in his career.

=== Matches ===
- Zhou Yuelong 3*–2 Mark Selby
- Kyren Wilson 3–1 Ali Carter
- Mark Williams 3–2 Zhou Yuelong
- Martin Gould 0–3 John Higgins
- Mark Selby 3–1 Kyren Wilson
- Ali Carter 3–0 Martin Gould
- John Higgins 3–2 Mark Williams
- Zhou Yuelong 3–1 Kyren Wilson
- Mark Selby 1–3 Ali Carter
- Martin Gould 3–1 Mark Williams
- John Higgins 2–3 Ali Carter
- Kyren Wilson 3–1 Mark Williams
- Zhou Yuelong 2–3 John Higgins
- Mark Selby 3–0 Martin Gould
- Kyren Wilson 1–3 John Higgins
- Ali Carter 3–2 Mark Williams
- Zhou Yuelong 3–0 Martin Gould
- Mark Selby 3–0 Mark Williams
- Kyren Wilson 3–2 Martin Gould
- Mark Selby 0–3 John Higgins
- Zhou Yuelong 2–3 Ali Carter

Notes

* Zhou Yuelong was awarded the first frame, due to Mark Selby arriving late.

=== Table ===
Pos	Player	Pld	W	L	FF	FA	FD	
1	John Higgins (SCO)	6	5	1	17	8	+9	Qualification to the Winners' Group play-off
2	Ali Carter (ENG)	6	5	1	16	10	+6	Qualification to the Winners' Group play-off
3	Zhou Yuelong (CHN)	6	3	3	15	12	+3	Qualification to the Winners' Group play-off
4	Mark Selby (ENG)	6	3	3	12	10	+2	Qualification to the Winners' Group play-off
5	Kyren Wilson (ENG)	6	3	3	12	13	−1	Eliminated from the competition
6	Mark Williams (WAL)	6	1	5	9	17	−8	Eliminated from the competition
7	Martin Gould (ENG)	6	1	5	5	16	−11	Eliminated from the competition

=== Play-offs ===
Semi-finals; Best of 5 frames
John Higgins (SCO)	3
Mark Selby (ENG)	2
Ali Carter (ENG)	0
Zhou Yuelong (CHN)	3

Final; Best of 5 frames
John Higgins (SCO)	3
Zhou Yuelong (CHN)	2

== Century breaks ==
Total: 116

- **147** (6), 140, 108, 106, 102, 101, 101 – Martin Gould
- **147** (7), 109 – Luca Brecel
- 146, 138, 137, 121, 113, 105, 103 – John Higgins
- **145** (1), 122, 100 – Ryan Day
- **144** (5), 136, 133, 123, 111, 104, 100 – Mark Williams
- 143, 103, 102 – Li Hang
- **141** (W), 131, 122, 111, 110, 105, 100 – Zhou Yuelong
- 140, 137, 134, 125, 124, 120, 120, 118, 110, 109, 108, 104, 103, 100, 100, 100 – Judd Trump
- 140, 137, 131, 129, 104 – Ricky Walden
- **140** (4), 115 – Liang Wenbo
- 139 – Tom Ford
- 139 – Michael Holt
- 138, 129, 122, 114, 104, 103, 101, 101 – Barry Hawkins
- **137** (3), 137, 131, 129, 105 – Kyren Wilson
- 136 – Graeme Dott
- 134, 125, 116, 107, 103, 101, 101 – Ali Carter
- **134** (2), 116, 110 – Neil Robertson
- 134, 116 – Mark King
- 132, 128, 112, 111, 104, 103, 103, 101, 101 – Mark Selby
- 125, 124, 102 – Mark Allen
- 122, 121, 113, 101 – Jimmy Robertson
- 120, 106, 103, 102, 101 – Ben Woollaston
- 118, 103 – Anthony Hamilton
- 115, 104 – Stephen Maguire
- 113, 111, 100 – Michael White
- 104 – Shaun Murphy

Bold: highest break in the indicated group.

== Winnings ==
No.	Player	1	2	3	4	5	6	7	W	TOTAL
1	John Higgins (SCO)							6,200	15,200	21,400
2	Zhou Yuelong (CHN)	6,200							**10,500**	16,700
3	Judd Trump (ENG)				2,600	3,200	4,300	5,100		15,200
4	Ali Carter (ENG)			1,100	5,900				6,200	13,200
5	Kyren Wilson (ENG)	1,100	2,400	**6,600**					2,400	12,500
6	Mark Selby (ENG)		6,300						6,000	12,300
7	Barry Hawkins (ENG) ^{(3)}		4,900	2,700	3,200					10,800
8	Ricky Walden (ENG)					4,500	2,200	2,500		9,200
9	Martin Gould (ENG)					1,200	**6,900**		1,000	9,100
10	Mark Williams (WAL)					**6,600**			1,800	8,400
11	Anthony Hamilton (ENG)	4,700	1,100	1,200						7,000
12	Ryan Day (WAL)	**3,300**	2,100	900						6,300
13	Mark Allen (NIR) ^{(2)}			4,700	100					4,800
14	Shaun Murphy (ENG) ^{(3)}				4,400					4,400
15	Stephen Maguire (SCO)	3,100	700							3,800
=	Tom Ford (ENG)			2,800	1,000					3,800
17	Ben Woollaston (ENG)					2,800	700			3,500
18	Li Hang (CHN) ^{(4)}						3,000			3,000
19	Jimmy Robertson (ENG)							2,800		2,800
20	Neil Robertson (AUS) ^{(1)}		**1,700**							1,700
21	Liang Wenbo (CHN) ^{(3)}				**1,500**					1,500
22	Mark King (ENG)	1,400								1,400
23	Graeme Dott (SCO) ^{(4)}						1,300			1,300
24	Luca Brecel (BEL)							**1,200**		1,200
25	Dominic Dale (WAL)							1,100		1,100
26	Michael Holt (ENG)	1,000								1,000
27	Joe Perry (ENG)					900				900
28	Michael White (WAL)						800			800
=	Robert Milkins (ENG)							800		800
30	David Gilbert (ENG)					400				400
	Total prize money	20,800	19,200	20,000	18,700	19,600	19,200	19,700	43,100	180,300

Green: Won the group. Bold: Highest break in the group. All prize money in GBP.
Notes
^{(1)} Neil Robertson withdrew for personal reasons after his fifth match in Group 2.
^{(2)} Mark Allen withdrew due to family reasons after his first match in Group 4.
^{(3)} Barry Hawkins, Shaun Murphy and Liang Wenbo withdrew from the tournament prior to Group 5 play.
^{(4)} Graeme Dott and Li Hang withdrew from the tournament prior to Group 7 play.
