= 2007 China Open (snooker) =

Coordinates: 39.968605°N 116.348991°E

Honghe Industrial China Open
Tournament information
- Dates: 25 March – 1 April 2007
- Venue: Beijing University Students' Gymnasium
- City: Beijing
- Country: China
- Organisation: WPBSA
- Format: Ranking event
- Total prize fund: £225,500
- Winner's share: £35,000
- Highest break: Jamie Cope (ENG) (145)

Final
- Champion: Graeme Dott (SCO)
- Runner-up: Jamie Cope (ENG)
- Score: 9–5

The 2007 Honghe Industrial China Open was a professional snooker tournament that took place between 25 March and 1 April 2007 at the Beijing University Students' Gymnasium in Beijing, China. It was the penultimate ranking event of the 2006–07 season, preceding the 2007 World Championship.

The defending champion was Mark Williams, but he lost in the first round 1–5 against Jamie Cope.

Graeme Dott won the tournament by defeating Cope 9–5 in the final.

== Prize fund ==
The breakdown of prize money for this year is shown below:

- Winner: £35,000
- Runner Up: £17,500
- Semi Finalists: £8,750
- Quarter Finalist: £6,500
- Last 16: £4,275
- Last 32: £2,750
- Last 48: £1,725
- Last 64: £1,325
- Stage one highest break: £500
- Stage two highest break: £2,000
- Stage one maximum break: £1,000
- Stage two maximum break: £20,000
- Total: £225,500

== Wildcard round ==
Match		Score	
WC1	Jamie Cope (ENG)	5–1	Yang Qingtian (CHN)
WC2	Alfie Burden (ENG)	2–5	Mei Xiwen (CHN)
WC3	Joe Swail (NIR)	5–4	Jin Long (CHN)
WC4	Ian Preece (WAL)	4–5	Li Hang (CHN)
WC5	Tom Ford (ENG)	3–5	Xiao Guodong (CHN)
WC6	Joe Jogia (ENG)	1–5	Yu Delu (CHN)
WC7	Andy Hicks (ENG)	4–5	Liu Chuang (CHN)
WC8	Jimmy White (ENG)	5–2	Zheng Peng (CHN)

== Main draw ==
Last 32; Best of 9 frames
1	(Wales) Mark Williams	1
(England) Jamie Cope	5
11	(England) Steve Davis	4
(England) Stuart Bingham	5
9	(Scotland) Stephen Maguire	5
(England) Mark King	3
7	(England) Shaun Murphy	5
(China) Mei Xiwen	1
8	(England) Peter Ebdon	3
(Northern Ireland) Joe Swail	5
12	(England) Barry Hawkins	5
(China) Ding Junhui	3
16	(England) Anthony Hamilton	4
(England) Mark Selby	5
4	(Republic of Ireland) Ken Doherty	5
(China) Li Hang	1
3	(Scotland) Stephen Hendry	4
(Hong Kong) Marco Fu	5
14	(Wales) Matthew Stevens	5
(China) Xiao Guodong	0
15	(England) Ali Carter	5
(China) Yu Delu	3
5	(England) Ronnie O'Sullivan	5
(China) Liu Chuang	1
6	(Scotland) John Higgins	5
(England) Ian McCulloch	2
10	(England) Stephen Lee	w/d
(England) Jimmy White	w/o
13	(Australia) Neil Robertson	5
(England) Michael Holt	1
2	(Scotland) Graeme Dott	5
(Thailand) James Wattana	2

Last 16; Best of 9 frames
(England) Jamie Cope	5
(England) Stuart Bingham	4
9	(Scotland) Stephen Maguire	2
7	(England) Shaun Murphy	5
(Northern Ireland) Joe Swail	0
12	(England) Barry Hawkins	5
(England) Mark Selby	1
4	(Republic of Ireland) Ken Doherty	5
(Hong Kong) Marco Fu	5
14	(Wales) Matthew Stevens	3
15	(England) Ali Carter	4
5	(England) Ronnie O'Sullivan	5
6	(Scotland) John Higgins	5
(England) Jimmy White	1
13	(Australia) Neil Robertson	1
2	(Scotland) Graeme Dott	5

Quarter-finals; Best of 9 frames
(England) Jamie Cope	5
7	(England) Shaun Murphy	0
12	(England) Barry Hawkins	5
4	(Republic of Ireland) Ken Doherty	4
(Hong Kong) Marco Fu	3
5	(England) Ronnie O'Sullivan	5
6	(Scotland) John Higgins	2
2	(Scotland) Graeme Dott	5

Semi-finals; Best of 11 frames
(England) Jamie Cope	6
12	(England) Barry Hawkins	5
5	(England) Ronnie O'Sullivan	2
2	(Scotland) Graeme Dott	6

Final; Best of 17 frames
(England) Jamie Cope	5
2	(Scotland) Graeme Dott	9

== Final ==
Final: Best of 17 frames. Referee: Johan Oomen. Beijing University Students' Gymnasium, Beijing, China, April 1, 2007.
Jamie Cope; England	5–9	Graeme Dott (2); Scotland
Afternoon: 46–71, 64–5 (64), 16–80, 97–0 (97), 0–132 (60, 72), 36–67, 0–76 (70), 0–95 (95); Evening: 91–4 (90), 97–0 (77), 71–57, 5–124 (124), 0–126 (126), 40–71
97	Highest break	126
0	Century breaks	2
4	50+ breaks	6

== Qualifying ==
Qualifying for the tournament took place at Pontins in Prestatyn, Wales between 23 January and 26 January 2007.

Round 1 Best of 9 frames
(England) Chris Norbury	5
(Republic of Ireland) David Morris	4
(China) Liang Wenbo	5
(Scotland) Robert Stephen	2
(England) Chris Melling	2
(New Zealand) Dene O'Kane	5
(England) Alfie Burden	5
(United Arab Emirates) Mohammed Shehab	3
(England) Paul Davison	4
(Malta) Alex Borg	5
(England) Mark Joyce	5
(Northern Ireland) Dermot McGlinchey	0
(China) Liu Song	4
(Thailand) Issara Kachaiwong	5
(Wales) Ian Preece	5
(Netherlands) Roy Stolk	1
(England) Judd Trump	5
(England) James Leadbetter	3
(England) Lee Page	3
(England) Peter Lines	5
(Scotland) Mark Boyle	5
(England) Ben Woollaston	4
(England) Matthew Couch	5
(England) Sean Storey	3
(England) Andrew Higginson	5
(Germany) Patrick Einsle	2
(England) Paul Wykes	0
(Thailand) Passakorn Suwannawat	5
(China) Tian Pengfei	5
(Wales) Jamie Jones	2
(England) Lee Spick	5
(England) Jeff Cundy	3

Round 2 Best of 9 frames
(Scotland) Scott MacKenzie	5
(England) Chris Norbury	4
(Finland) Robin Hull	5
(China) Liang Wenbo	1
(England) David Roe	3
(New Zealand) Dene O'Kane	5
(Pakistan) Shokat Ali	4
(England) Alfie Burden	5
(Scotland) Jamie Burnett	5
(Malta) Alex Borg	3
(England) Mike Dunn	0
(England) Mark Joyce	5
(England) Stuart Pettman	5
(Thailand) Issara Kachaiwong	4
(England) David Gilbert	0
(Wales) Ian Preece	5
(England) Rory McLeod	1
(England) Judd Trump	5
(England) Jimmy Michie	1
(England) Peter Lines	5
(England) Joe Jogia	5
(Scotland) Mark Boyle	3
(Northern Ireland) Mark Allen	5
(England) Matthew Couch	4
(Wales) Paul Davies	5
(England) Andrew Higginson	4
(England) Andrew Norman	5
(Thailand) Passakorn Suwannawat	3
(Republic of Ireland) Joe Delaney	3
(China) Tian Pengfei	5
(Malta) Tony Drago	3
(England) Lee Spick	5

Round 3 Best of 9 frames
(England) Jamie Cope	5
(Scotland) Scott MacKenzie	2
(Scotland) Drew Henry	5
(Finland) Robin Hull	3
(Northern Ireland) Gerard Greene	5
(New Zealand) Dene O'Kane	1
(England) Rod Lawler	2
(England) Alfie Burden	5
(Republic of Ireland) Michael Judge	2
(Scotland) Jamie Burnett	5
(England) Adrian Gunnell	5
(England) Mark Joyce	2
(England) Mark Davis	5
(England) Stuart Pettman	1
(England) Barry Pinches	2
(Wales) Ian Preece	5
(England) John Parrott	4
(England) Judd Trump	5
(England) Tom Ford	5
(England) Peter Lines	2
(England) Ricky Walden	2
(England) Joe Jogia	5
(England) Dave Harold	4
(Northern Ireland) Mark Allen	5
(Scotland) Marcus Campbell	5
(Wales) Paul Davies	4
(England) Jimmy White	5
(England) Andrew Norman	1
(Republic of Ireland) Fergal O'Brien	5
(China) Tian Pengfei	4
(Wales) Dominic Dale	4
(England) Lee Spick	5

Round 4 Best of 9 frames
(Wales) Ryan Day	0
(England) Jamie Cope	5
(England) Stuart Bingham	5
(Scotland) Drew Henry	2
(England) Mark King	5
(Northern Ireland) Gerard Greene	2
(England) David Gray	3
(England) Alfie Burden	5
(Northern Ireland) Joe Swail	5
(Scotland) Jamie Burnett	0
(China) Ding Junhui	5
(England) Adrian Gunnell	3
(England) Mark Selby	5
(England) Mark Davis	4
(England) Robert Milkins	3
(Wales) Ian Preece	5
(Hong Kong) Marco Fu	5
(England) Judd Trump	2
(England) Joe Perry	3
(England) Tom Ford	5
(Scotland) Alan McManus	2
(England) Joe Jogia	5
(England) Andy Hicks	5
(Northern Ireland) Mark Allen	4
(England) Ian McCulloch	5
(Scotland) Marcus Campbell	1
(England) Nigel Bond	2
(England) Jimmy White	5
(England) Michael Holt	5
(Republic of Ireland) Fergal O'Brien	4
(Thailand) James Wattana	5
(England) Lee Spick	1

== Century breaks ==
=== Qualifying stage centuries ===
- 141, 102 – Matthew Couch
- 141 – Judd Trump
- 136 – Joe Jogia
- 131 – Paul Davies
- 129, 115 – Tian Pengfei
- 128 – Barry Pinches
- 124 – Tom Ford
- 117 – Mark Joyce
- 114 – Chris Norbury
- 110, 100 – Jamie Burnett
- 109 – Lee Spick
- 108 – Issara Kachaiwong
- 106, 101 – Ian Preece
- 105 – Mark Allen
- 103 – Liu Song
- 103 – Andrew Higginson
- 103 – Joe Delaney
- 102 – Jamie Jones
- 102 – Ricky Walden

=== Televised stage centuries ===
- 145, 134, 104 – Jamie Cope
- 141 – Neil Robertson
- 137, 134, 110 – Barry Hawkins
- 137 – Joe Perry
- 130, 123 – Ding Junhui
- 128 – Mark Davis
- 126, 124, 118, 117, 106, 102 – Graeme Dott
- 124, 102 – Stuart Bingham
- 121, 120, 102 – Mark Selby
- 120 – Ken Doherty
- 118 – Mark Allen
- 113 – Andy Hicks
- 111 – James Wattana
- 110, 105, 100 – Ronnie O'Sullivan
- 110 – John Higgins
- 108 – Matthew Stevens
- 108 – Stephen Hendry
- 106 – Adrian Gunnell
- 104, 100 – Marco Fu
- 103 – Ian McCulloch
- 102 – Stephen Maguire
- 100 – Anthony Hamilton
- 100 – Ali Carter
