= 2006–07 snooker season =

Details
- Duration: 13 July 2006 – 14 May 2007
- Tournaments: 27 (7 ranking events)

Triple Crown winners
- UK Championship: (England) Peter Ebdon
- Masters: (England) Ronnie O'Sullivan
- World Championship: (Scotland) John Higgins

The 2006–07 snooker season was a series of snooker tournaments played between 13 July 2006 and 14 May 2007.

== New professional players ==
Countries

- China
- England
- Ireland
- Netherlands
- New Zealand
- Northern Ireland
- Scotland
- Thailand
- United Arab Emirates
- Wales

Note: New means in these case, that these players were not on the 2005/2006 professional Main Tour.

International champions

1. IBSF Grand Prix runner-up: Mark Boyle (SCO)
2. EBSA European Snooker Championships runner-up: Jeff Cundy (ENG)
3. European Play Off winner: Roy Stolk (NLD)
4. EBSA European Under-19 Snooker Championships winner: Ben Woollaston (ENG)
5. ACBS Asian Snooker Championship winner: Issara Kachaiwong (THA)
6. ACBS Asian Snooker Championship runner-up: Mohammed Shehab (UAE)
7. ACBS Asian Under-21 Snooker Championship winner: Passakorn Suwannawat (THA)
8. Oceania Championship winner: Dene O'Kane (NZL)

NGB nominations

9. English nomination 1: (Note: James Leadbetter qualified by topping the Pro Ticket Tour rankings.) James Leadbetter (ENG)
10. English nomination 2: (Note: Peter Lines qualified by winning the Pro Ticket Tour Play Offs.) Peter Lines (ENG)
11. Welsh nomination: (Note: Jamie Jones qualified by topping the Welsh rankings.) Jamie Jones (WAL)
12. Scottish nomination: (Note: Robert Stephen qualified by topping the Scottish rankings.) Robert Stephen (SCO)
13. Irish nomination: (Note: David Morris qualified by topping the Irish rankings.) David Morris (IRL)
14. Northern Irish nomination: (Note: Dermot McGlinchey qualified by topping the Northern Irish rankings.) Dermot McGlinchey (NIR)

From PIOS Tour

15. Liu Song (CHN)
16. Andrew Higginson (ENG)
17. Ian Preece (WAL)
18. Chris Melling (ENG)
19. Mark Joyce (ENG)
20. Paul Davison (ENG)
21. Tian Pengfei (CHN)
22. Lee Page (ENG)

== Calendar ==
The following table outlines the results and dates for all the ranking and major invitational events.

=== World Snooker Tour ===
Start	Finish	Country	Tournament name	Venue	City	Winner	Runner-up	Score	Ref.
13 Aug	20 Aug	NIR	Northern Ireland Trophy	Waterfront Hall	Belfast	(China) Ding Junhui	(England) Ronnie O'Sullivan	9–6	
2 Sep		ENG	Pot Black	Royal Automobile Club	London	(Wales) Mark Williams	(Scotland) John Higgins	1–0	
21 Oct	29 Oct	SCO	Grand Prix	A.E.C.C.	Aberdeen	(Australia) Neil Robertson	(England) Jamie Cope	9–5	
4 Nov	9 Nov	ENG	Masters Qualifying Event	English Institute of Sport	Sheffield	(England) Stuart Bingham	(England) Mark Selby	6–2	
14 Sep	3 Dec	ENG	Premier League	Forum Centre	Wythenshawe	(England) Ronnie O'Sullivan	(England) Jimmy White	7–0	
4 Dec	17 Dec	ENG	UK Championship	Barbican Centre	York	(England) Peter Ebdon	(Scotland) Stephen Hendry	10–6	
14 Jan	21 Jan	ENG	Masters	Wembley Arena	London	(England) Ronnie O'Sullivan	(China) Ding Junhui	10–3	
29 Jan	4 Feb	MLT	Malta Cup	Hilton Conference Center	Portomaso	(England) Shaun Murphy	(Wales) Ryan Day	9–4	
12 Feb	18 Feb	WAL	Welsh Open	Newport Centre	Newport	(Australia) Neil Robertson	(England) Andrew Higginson	9–8	
25 Mar	1 Apr	CHN	China Open	Beijing University Students' Gymnasium	Beijing	(Scotland) Graeme Dott	(England) Jamie Cope	9–5	
21 Apr	7 May	ENG	World Championship	Crucible Theatre	Sheffield	(Scotland) John Higgins	(England) Mark Selby	18–13	

Ranking event
Non-ranking event

=== World Ladies Billiards and Snooker Association ===
Start	Finish	Country	Tournament name	Venue	City	Winner	Runner-up	Score	Ref.
16 Sep	16 Sep	ENG	UK Ladies Championship	North East Derbyshire Snooker Centre	Chesterfield	(England) Reanne Evans	(England) June Banks	4–2	
21 Oct	21 Oct	ENG	East Anglian Championship	Cambridge Snooker Centre	Cambridge	(England) Reanne Evans	(England) June Banks	4–3	
18 Nov	18 Nov	ENG	British Open	Cueball Derby	Derby	(England) Reanne Evans	(England) June Banks	4–2	
10 Feb	10 Feb	ENG	South Coast Classic	Rileys Snooker Club	Brighton	(England) Reanne Evans	(England) Maria Catalano	4–2	
10 Mar	10 Mar	ENG	Connie Gough Memorial	Rileys Snooker Club	Luton	(England) Maria Catalano	(England) June Banks	3–1	
31 Mar	5 Apr	ENG	World Women's Championship	Cambridge Snooker Centre	Cambridge	(England) Reanne Evans	(England) Katie Henrick	5–3	

=== Pontin's International Open Series ===
Start	Finish	Country	Tournament name	Venue	City	Winner	Runner-up	Score	Ref.
18 Sep	22 Sep	WAL	PIOS I	Pontin's	Prestatyn	(England) Munraj Pal	(Norway) Kurt Maflin	6–3	
12 Oct	16 Oct	WAL	PIOS II	Pontin's	Prestatyn	(Northern Ireland) Julian Logue	(England) Alex Davies	6–5	
30 Nov	4 Dec	WAL	PIOS III	Pontin's	Prestatyn	(Republic of Ireland) Leo Fernandez	(Wales) Lee Walker	6–5	
14 Jan	18 Jan	WAL	PIOS IV	Pontin's	Prestatyn	(England) Kuldesh Johal	(Wales) Lee Walker	6–4	
1 Feb	5 Feb	WAL	PIOS V	Pontin's	Prestatyn	(Norway) Kurt Maflin	(England) Ashley Wright	6–3	
4 Mar	8 Mar	WAL	PIOS VI	Pontin's	Prestatyn	(England) Jamie O'Neill	(England) Ashley Wright	6–2	
12 Apr	16 Apr	WAL	PIOS VII	Pontin's	Prestatyn	(Belgium) Bjorn Haneveer	(England) Craig Steadman	6–2	
10 May	14 May	WAL	PIOS VIII	Pontin's	Prestatyn	(Scotland) James McBain	(Norway) Kurt Maflin	6–4	

=== Other events ===
Start	Finish	Country	Tournament name	Venue	City	Winner	Runner-up	Score	Ref.
13 Jul	16 Jul	THA	Thailand Masters	Hua Hin Grand Hotel	Hua Hin	(Hong Kong) Marco Fu	(Thailand) Issara Kachaiwong	5–3	
25 Aug	27 Aug	GER	Fürth German Open	Stadthalle	Fürth	(England) Michael Holt	(England) Barry Hawkins	4–2	
16 Sep	17 Sep	WAL	Pontin's Pro Am Series	Pontin's	Prestatyn	(Republic of Ireland) Ken Doherty	(England) Ricky Walden	4–2	
9 Oct	11 Oct	IRL	Irish Professional Championship	Spawell Sport & Leisure Complex	Templeogue	(Republic of Ireland) Ken Doherty	(Republic of Ireland) Michael Judge	9–4	
9 Nov	12 Nov	SUI	Swiss Open	Billiard Center Im Funken	Zofingen	(England) Matthew Couch	(England) Dave Harold	4–3	
6 Dec	7 Dec	QAT	Asian Games	Al-Sadd Multi-Purpose Hall	Doha	(China) Ding Junhui	(China) Liang Wenbo	4–2	
16 Dec	17 Dec	NED	Dutch Open	De Dieze	's-Hertogenbosch	(England) Michael Wild	(England) Mark King	6–5	
9 Mar	11 Mar	IRL	Irish Masters	Ormonde Hotel	Kilkenny	(England) Ronnie O'Sullivan	(England) Barry Hawkins	9–1	

== Official rankings ==
The top 16 of the world rankings, these players automatically played in the final rounds of the world ranking events and were invited for the Masters.

No.	Ch.	Player	Points 2004/05	Points 2005/06	Total
1	▲	(Scotland) Stephen Hendry	21337	15100	36437
2	▲	(Republic of Ireland) Ken Doherty	15887	20250	36137
3	▼	(England) Ronnie O'Sullivan	23162	12850	36012
4	▲	(Scotland) John Higgins	15812	19150	34962
5	▲	(England) Shaun Murphy	16375	16350	32725
6	▲	(Scotland) Graeme Dott	13500	19100	32600
7	Steady	(England) Peter Ebdon	15650	15550	31200
8	▲	(Wales) Mark Williams	12837	18300	31137
9	▼	(Scotland) Stephen Maguire	19725	11000	30725
10	Steady	(England) Stephen Lee	15625	13500	29125
11	▲	(England) Steve Davis	15775	13100	28875
12	▲	(England) Barry Hawkins	13225	14600	27825
13	▲	(Australia) Neil Robertson	14425	12575	27000
14	▼	(Wales) Matthew Stevens	15262	8600	23862
15	▲	(England) Ali Carter	14175	9550	23725
16	▲	(England) Anthony Hamilton	14312	9413	23725

== World ranking points ==
No.	Player	Points 2005/06	NIT	GP	UK	WO	MC	CO	WSC	Points 2006/07	Total
1	(Scotland) John Higgins	19150	1900	2500	4800	700	700	2500	10000	23100	42250
2	(Scotland) Graeme Dott	19100	2500	575	4800	1900	2500	5000	1400	18675	37775
3	(England) Shaun Murphy	16350	2500	1400	1050	2500	5000	2500	6400	21350	37700
4	(Republic of Ireland) Ken Doherty	20250	2500	1900	2850	1900	2500	2500	1400	15550	35800
5	(England) Ronnie O'Sullivan	12850	4000	2500	2850	2500	700	3200	5000	20750	33600
6	(England) Peter Ebdon	15550	700	1400	7500	700	3200	700	3800	18000	33550
7	(Australia) Neil Robertson	12575	1900	5000	1050	5000	1900	1900	3800	20550	33125
8	(Scotland) Stephen Hendry	15100	1900	575	6000	1900	2500	700	3800	17375	32475
9	(China) Ding Junhui	14475	5000	1400	3750	575	1400	1400	2800	16325	30800
10	(Scotland) Stephen Maguire	11000	1900	1400	2850	3200	1900	1900	6400	19550	30550
11	(England) Mark Selby	9125	1900	1900	2100	1900	575	1900	8000	18275	27400
12	(Wales) Mark Williams	18300	1900	575	2850	700	700	700	1400	8825	27125
13	(England) Stephen Lee	13500	3200	1900	2850	700	1900	700	1400	12650	26150
14	(England) Ali Carter	9550	700	1400	1050	2500	3200	1900	5000	15750	25300
15	(England) Steve Davis	13100	700	1400	3750	3200	700	700	1400	11850	24950
16	(Wales) Ryan Day	10050	2500	1900	2100	575	4000	575	2800	14450	24500

== Points distribution ==
2006/2007 Points distribution for world ranking events:

Tournament	Round →	L96	L80	L64	L48	L32	L16	QF	SF	F	W
Northern Ireland Trophy	Unseeded loser	400	650	900	1150	1400	1900	2500	3200	4000	5000
Northern Ireland Trophy	Seeded loser	200	325	450	575	700	–	–	–	–	–
UK Championship	Unseeded loser	600	975	1350	1725	2100	2850	3750	4800	6000	7500
UK Championship	Seeded loser	300	488	675	863	1050	–	–	–	–	–
Malta Cup	Unseeded loser	400	650	900	1150	1400	1900	2500	3200	4000	5000
Malta Cup	Seeded loser	200	325	450	575	700	–	–	–	–	–
Welsh Open	Unseeded loser	400	650	900	1150	1400	1900	2500	3200	4000	5000
Welsh Open	Seeded loser	200	325	450	575	700	–	–	–	–	–
China Open	Unseeded loser	400	650	900	1150	1400	1900	2500	3200	4000	5000
China Open	Seeded loser	200	325	450	575	700	–	–	–	–	–
World Championship	Unseeded loser	800	1300	1800	2300	2800	3800	5000	6400	8000	10000
World Championship	Seeded loser	400	650	900	1150	1400	–	–	–	–	–

Tournament	Stage 1 Group				Stage 2 Group		L16	QF	SF	F	W
Tournament	7–8	5–6	3–4	1–2	5–6	3–4	L16	QF	SF	F	W
Grand Prix	200	650	900	1150	575 (Note: Only for seeded players)	1400	1900	2500	3200	4000	5000
