= 2007 World Snooker Championship =

Professional snooker tournament

2007 888.com World Snooker Championship
Tournament information
- Dates: 21 April – 7 May 2007
- Venue: Crucible Theatre
- City: Sheffield
- Country: England
- Organisation: WPBSA
- Format: Ranking event
- Total prize fund: £941,000
- Winner's share: £220,000
- Highest break: Ali Carter (ENG) (144)

Final
- Champion: John Higgins (SCO)
- Runner-up: Mark Selby (ENG)
- Score: 18–13

The 2007 World Snooker Championship (officially the 2007 888.com World Snooker Championship) was a professional snooker tournament. It was held at the Crucible Theatre in Sheffield, England, the 31st consecutive year that the World Snooker Championship was staged at the venue. It started on 21 April 2007 and was scheduled to finish on 7 May 2007, but continued into the early hours of 8 May. The seventh and final ranking tournament of the 2006–07 snooker season, it was organised by the World Professional Billiards and Snooker Association and sponsored for the second time by online casino 888.com. The total prize fund was £941,000, of which the winner received £220,000.

The qualifying rounds took place from 23 February to 2 March 2007 at Pontin's in Prestatyn, Wales, and from 12 to 15 March at the English Institute of Sport in Sheffield. The successful 16 qualifiers met the top 16 players from the snooker world rankings in the tournament's main stage at the Crucible. Graeme Dott was the defending champion, having defeated Peter Ebdon 18–14 in the 2006 final. He lost in the first round to Ian McCulloch and became another world champion who fell to the Crucible curse and could not defend his first world title.

John Higgins won his second world title by defeating qualifier Mark Selby 18–13 in the final. Ending at 12:54 a.m. BST, the final broke the record for the latest finish time in a World Snooker Championship final, narrowly beating the 2006 final by two minutes. A total of 68 century breaks were compiled during the event's main stage, the highest being a 144 made by Ali Carter. It was the joint-highest number with the 2002 event until 2009. Another 61 century breaks were made during the qualifying rounds.

== Background ==
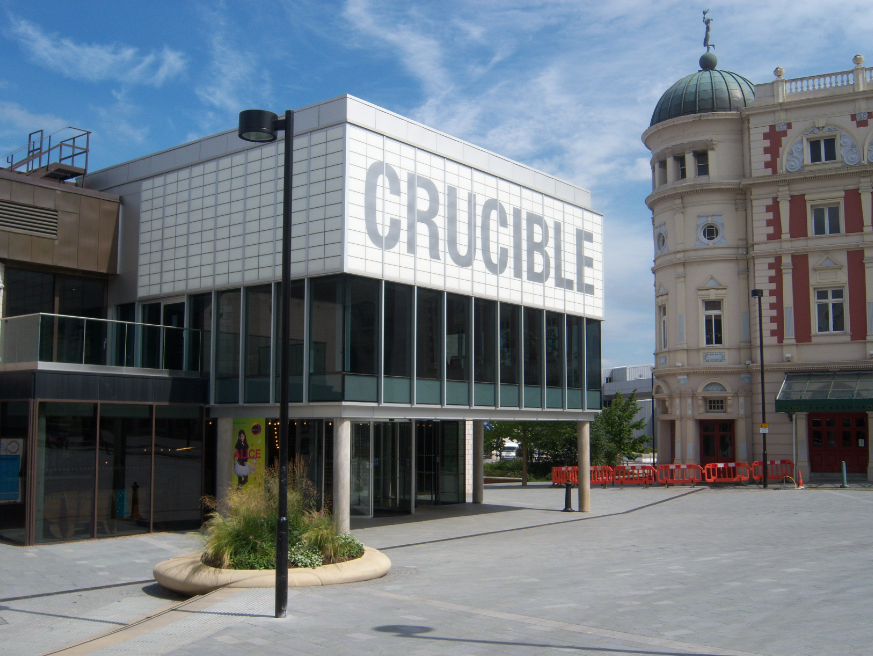
For the 31st consecutive year, the main stage of the tournament was held at the Crucible Theatre (pictured) in Sheffield, England.

The inaugural 1927 World Snooker Championship, then known as the Professional Championship of Snooker, took place at various venues in England between November 1926 and May 1927. Joe Davis won the final—held at Camkin's Hall in Birmingham from 9 to 12 May 1927—and went on to win the tournament 15 consecutive times before retiring undefeated after the 1946 edition (no tournaments were held from 1941 to 1945 because of World War II). The tournament went into abeyance after only two players contested the 1952 edition, due to a dispute between the Professional Billiards Players' Association (PBPA) and the Billiards Association and Control Council (BACC). The PBPA established an alternative tournament, the World Professional Match-play Championship, of which the six editions held between 1952 and 1957 are retroactively regarded as legitimate continuations of the World Snooker Championship. However, due to waning public interest in snooker during the post-war era, that tournament was also discontinued, and the world title was uncontested between 1958 and 1963.

Then-professional player Rex Williams was instrumental in reviving the World Snooker Championship on a challenge basis in 1964. John Pulman, winner of the 1957 World Professional Match-play Championship, defended the world title across seven challenge matches between 1964 and 1968. The World Snooker Championship reverted to an annual knockout tournament for the 1969 edition, marking the beginning of the championship's "modern era". The 1977 edition was the first staged at the Crucible Theatre in Sheffield, where it has remained since. The most successful player in the modern era was Stephen Hendry, having won the title seven times. Hendry was also the tournament's youngest winner, having captured his first title at the 1990 event, aged 21 years and 106 days. Ray Reardon became the oldest winner when he secured his sixth title at the 1978 event, aged 45 years and 203 days.

Graeme Dott was the defending champion, having won his first title at the 2006 championship, defeating Peter Ebdon 18‍–‍14 in the final. Organised by the World Professional Billiards and Snooker Association, the 2007 tournament was sponsored by online casino 888.com.

=== Format ===
The 2007 World Snooker Championship took place from 21 April to 7 May 2007 in Sheffield, England. The tournament was the last of seven ranking events in the 2006–07 snooker season on the World Snooker Tour. It featured a 32-player main draw that was held at the Crucible Theatre, as well as a qualifying draw that was played at Pontin's, in Prestatyn, Wales from 23 February to 2 March and from 12 to 15 March. This was the 31st consecutive year that the tournament had been staged at the Crucible. The main stages of the event were broadcast by the BBC in the United Kingdom.

The top 16 players in the latest world rankings automatically qualified for the main draw as seeded players. (Note: In the event of the defending champion being ranked outside the top 16, he would replace the player ranked world number 16 as an automatic qualifier.) Dott was seeded first overall as the defending champion, and the remaining 15 seeds were allocated based on the latest world rankings. The number of frames required to win a match increased throughout the tournament. The first round consisted of best-of-19-frames matches, with the final match being played over a maximum of 35 frames. All 16 non-seeded spots in the main draw were filled with players from the qualifying rounds. The draw for the televised stage of the World Championship was made on 19 March 2007 and announced on the following day.

=== Prize fund ===
The breakdown of prize money for this year is shown below:

- Winner: £220,000
- Runner-up: £110,000
- Semi-final: £42,000
- Quarter-final: £22,000
- Last 16: £14,000
- Last 32: £10,600
- Last 48: £7,400
- Last 64: £4,500
- Stage one highest break: £1,000
- Stage two highest break: £10,000
- Stage one maximum break: £5,000
- Stage two maximum break: £147,000
- Total: £941,000

== Summary ==
=== Qualifying ===
Two preliminary qualifying rounds and four qualifying rounds for the tournament took place at Pontin's Prestatyn, Wales between 22 February and 2 March. The final qualifying round took place at the English Institute of Sport in Sheffield between the 12 and 15 March 2007.

Members of the World Professional Billiards and Snooker Association (WPBSA) that were not part of the 96-player main tour were permitted to compete in pre-qualifying. Three-time semi-finalist Tony Knowles lost 4–5 to Del Smith. Smith's highest break in the match was 35, while Knowles had a best break of 34. Knowles was eligible as a former WPBSA board member, and Smith, who defeated Barry Stark 5–4 in the second round, retained his WPBSA membership to continue as a WPBSA coach. James Leadbetter made breaks of 138 and 126 in defeating Les Dodd 10-8.

The youngest player in the tournament, Judd Trump, 17, compiled breaks of 142 and 116 when he beat Bradley Jones 10–8 in the second round. Robin Hull withdrew from his third round match against Mark Joyce after being diagnosed with an irregular heartbeat.

The six-time runner-up Jimmy White failed to qualify for the main event for only the second time in 27 years when he lost 4–10 to Jamie Burnett. Mark Allen recorded three century breaks in his 10–4 win against Robert Milkins. 1991 champion John Parrott recovered from 3–6 against David Gray to win 10–4. Ding Junhui became the first Chinese player to qualify for the main tournament, defeating Mark Davis 10–6. Trump was the third-ever 17-year-old to qualify, overcoming James Wattana 10–5 after leading 9–1.

=== First round ===
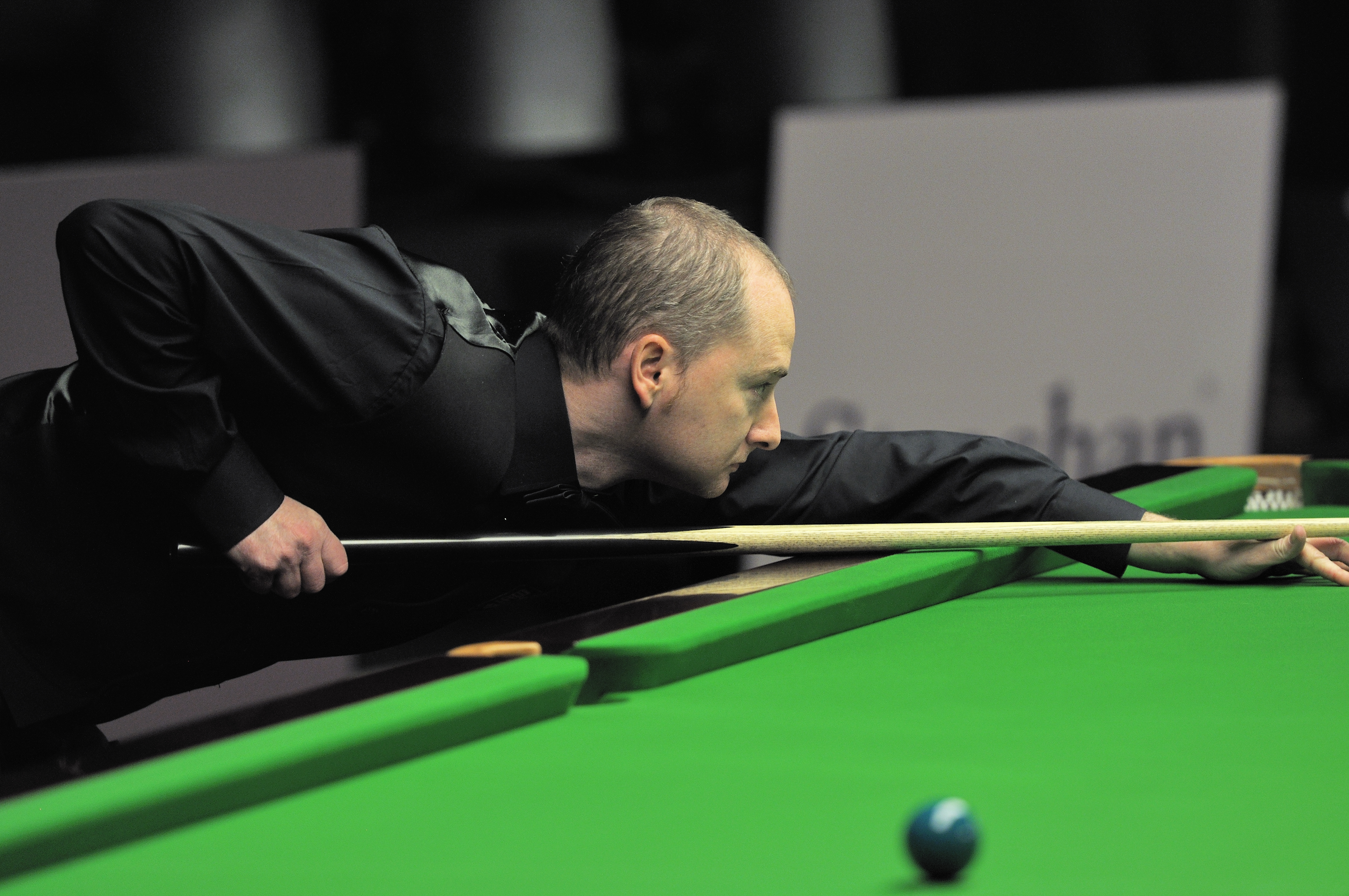
Graeme Dott (pictured in 2014) was the defending champion, but he lost to Ian McCulloch 7‍–‍10 in the first round, succumbing to what has been called the 'Crucible curse'.

The first round was played between 21 and 26 April as the best of 19 frames held over two sessions. The defending champion, Graeme Dott, lost 7‍–‍10 to Ian McCulloch. This made Dott the 14th first-time champion who failed to defend his title since the tournament moved to the Crucible Theatre in 1977, succumbing to what has been called the 'Crucible curse'. "The way Ian [McCulloch] plays frustrated the life out of me," Dott said. In his match against Steve Davis, John Parrott compiled a century break of 126 and manufactured a 6‍–‍1 lead, but Davis stopped the rot with a break of 100 and produced further breaks of 69 and 70 to tie the match at 6‍–‍6. Parrott then compiled an 80 and a 64, and, although Davis forced a deciding frame with a break of 96, Parrott prevailed.

Peter Ebdon, the winner of the 2006 UK Championship during the season, was faced with the 1995 runner-up, Nigel Bond. Ebdon manufactured a 4‍–‍0 lead, but Bond stopped the rot taking the following frame on the blue ball and then produced breaks of 40, 68, 46 and 114 to go 5‍–‍4 in front for the first time. Ebdon turned the scores around once again with back-to-back breaks of 60, but Bond compiled yet another 60 to tie the scores 6‍–‍6. Bond made a century break as Ebdon won four out of the five last frames of the match for a 10‍–‍7 victory. John Higgins, champion of the tournament in the 1998 edition, had not made it further than the semi-finals of the 2006 UK Championship during the season. He won 10‍–‍4 over Michael Holt, whose "inability to deal with frustration" was heavily criticised by snooker commentator Clive Everton, writing for The Guardian. "I've tried to work on the mental side of my game for seven years but nothing seems to change. I can't accept it when things go wrong. I sit there and feel so annoyed," said Holt. Andy Hicks, a semi-finalist in 1995, was beaten by the 15th seed Ali Carter, who compiled century breaks of 112 and 129 en route to a 10‍–‍4 win.

Two qualifiers, Fergal O'Brien and Joe Swail, also won their first-round matches in a deciding frame. In a match that featured two century breaks, O'Brien was 6‍–‍4, 8‍–‍5 and 9‍–‍6 ahead of Barry Hawkins, but Hawkins made breaks of 129, 78 and 66 to tie the match 9‍–‍9. O'Brien won the 19th frame 71‍–‍25 to win the match. "It's horrible having come back from 9‍–‍6 down to level at 9‍–‍9 and then get beaten," Hawkins said. Swail fell 0‍–‍4 behind the two-time world champion Mark Williams, but replied with breaks of 66, 63, 53, 62, 71 and 72 to equalise. Swail also made a century break of 114 in the match, and breaks of both 65 and 56 in the decider, winning 10‍–‍9. Also a qualifier, Mark Selby saw Stephen Lee compile breaks of 126, 64, 67 and 71 as he went 0‍–‍5 behind. However, Selby won eight frames in a row, later winning 10‍–‍7. "At 5‍–‍0 up I should have put my foot onto his throat. He didn't play well and won, that's the biggest frustration. I thought he was going to bottle it because he's not a big-time player," claimed Lee in the post-match interview.

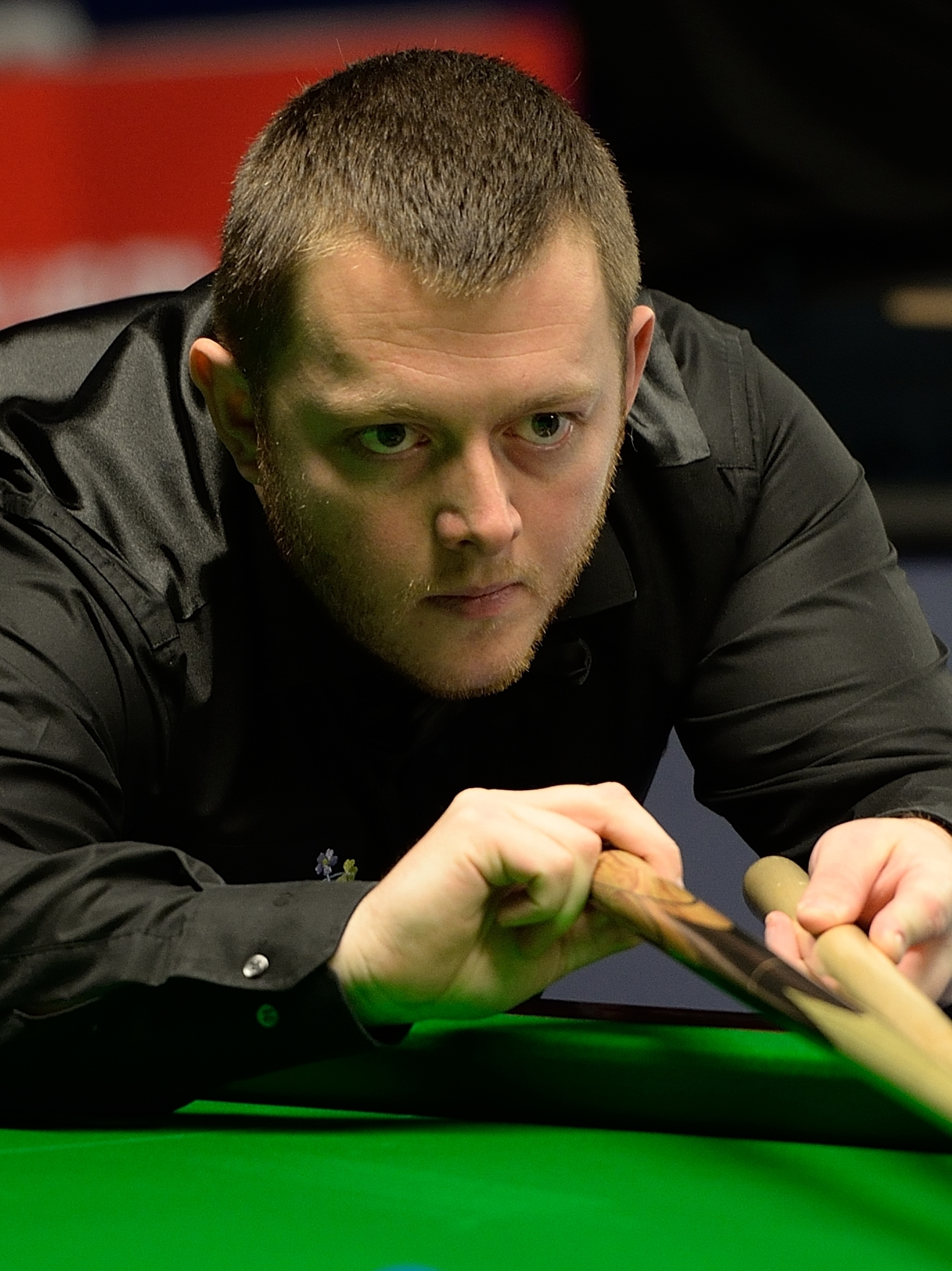
Mark Allen (pictured in 2015) was the only debutant to win his first-round match, a 10‍–‍7 defeat of the 1997 champion and third seed Ken Doherty.

There were five debutants in this year's tournament: Mark Allen, Judd Trump, Ding Junhui, David Gilbert and Joe Delaney. Allen, who faced the 1997 champion and third seed Ken Doherty, was the only one of the five who won his first-round match. Aided by breaks of 92 and 95 in the first two frames, Allen led 4‍–‍0. Doherty made a 135 century break to level the scores at 7 each, but Allen clinched a 10‍–‍7 victory with three consecutive half-century breaks. Trump became only the third 17-year-old, after Hendry and Ronnie O'Sullivan, to qualify for the Crucible, where he set up a first-round encounter with Shaun Murphy, the 2005 champion. Although Murphy won the first three frames with breaks of 81, 96 and 52, Trump compiled breaks of 93, 57 and 85 to go ahead at 6‍–‍5. However, Murphy won five frames in a row to advance into the second round. "The amount of talent he showed me at times baffled me. He was like Jimmy White when he first came here," Murphy said of Trump. Gilbert, ranked 67th in the world, also took five consecutive frames, featuring one century break, to lead seven-time champion Stephen Hendry 5‍–‍1, but he eventually lost 7‍–‍10. "I kept missing, missing and missing. I suppose I twitched up completely. I didn't feel nervous but I suppose the Crucible jitters got me at the end," said Gilbert afterwards. Delaney won two deciders against Barry Pinches and Alan McManus to reach the Crucible, but, having trailed 0‍–‍5, he was beaten 2‍–‍10 by Matthew Stevens.

Ding, considered by bookmakers to be among the favourites for the title, was drawn against O'Sullivan, who alleged that the World Professional Billiards and Snooker Association draw had been fixed. O'Sullivan noted that he had been drawn to Marco Fu in the first round of the 2003 edition and to the 2004 European Open and 2004 UK Championship winner Stephen Maguire in both 2004 and 2005. "I've had Marco Fu, Stephen Maguire twice and now Ding in the first round. It's definitely fixed. Whoever is doing that is trying to stitch me up," claimed O'Sullivan. He later withdrew the accusation, and made no formal complaint to the WPBSA, who maintained that the draw was "100% genuine". O'Sullivan compiled a century break and further breaks of 58, 50, 60, 63, 63, 70, 87 and 72 to claim a 10‍–‍2 victory.

Neil Robertson, champion of both the 2006 Grand Prix and the 2007 Welsh Open, made a half-century of 79 as he took a 4‍–‍0 lead over Ryan Day, who had only made it past the first round of the World Championship once, in the previous edition. Day made the only century break of the match, but went on to lose 5‍–‍10. "Springy cushions, many kicks and errors accounted for a lower standard than expected," wrote Everton about the match. Breaks of 84 and 80 aided Anthony Hamilton into a 5‍–‍0 lead against Marco Fu. Even though Fu made a century break, Hamilton took two frames by a single point and one on the re-spotted black, and won 10‍–‍3. Maguire defeated Joe Perry by the same margin, compiling breaks of 66, 64, 83, 124, 68 and 56 in the process. "I don't like to make excuses but he had a nice run of the balls and at this level it makes a difference," Perry said.

=== Second round ===
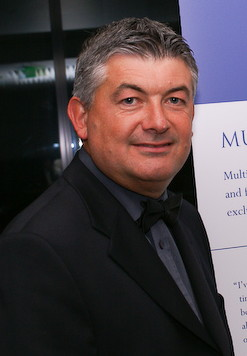
The 1991 champion John Parrott (pictured in 2008) was defeated 8‍–‍13 by Shaun Murphy in the second round and never played at the final stages of the World Snooker Championship again.

The second round of the event was played as the best of 25 frames, held over three sessions, between 26 and 30 April. Breaks of 65 and 100 helped Murphy to a four-frame lead against Parrott, who recovered and equalled the scores at 8‍–‍8, making a 123 break in the process. Murphy then made a total clearance of 131 and won five consecutive frames for a 13‍–‍8 victory. "It's been a very long time since I've been that nervous. I felt as though I'd got a family of ferrets in my waistcoat," said Parrott about the final session. This was the last time Parrot reached the final stages of the World Championship. Hamilton made two centuries as he completed a 13‍–‍8 victory over McCulloch. "The match was rubbish until halfway through but I enjoyed the battle," admitted Hamilton, who had not made it to the quarter-finals since the 2004 edition. This was the last appearance at the Crucible for McCulloch.

Maguire took a six-frame lead into the final session of his match against Swail. Swail made breaks of 82, 72, 56 and 77 to trail by three at 8‍–‍11. Maguire was told off by the referee, Michaela Tabb, for punching the table in desperation after missing a pot. Maguire, who later praised Swail as a "comeback player", won the last two frames for a 13‍–‍8 victory. Stevens won the first four frames in his match against Allen. Allen replied with two century breaks of 101 and 118 and a further half-century of 65. Stevens then made an 85 followed by a 101 and took two more frames to move to 8‍–‍3. Going 9‍–‍7 into the last session, the pair compiled one more century break each. Allen could have made it 10‍–‍11, but he failed to pot a black ball in a frame which then went in Stevens's direction, who closed the match with a 13‍–‍9 score.

Carter won six frames on the trot, featuring breaks of 78, 72 twice and 111, to lead Hendry 12‍–‍4 going into the final session. Hendry, chasing a record-extending eighth title, had changed cues three weeks ahead of the tournament, but blamed the poor performance on his lack of confidence and on his inability to reproduce his "practice form" on the Crucible table. Carter produced a further half-century as he closed the match with a 13‍–‍6 victory. "His safety play was some of the best that's ever been played against me. I don't think I've ever been snookered so much in my life," praised Hendry. Higgins compiled breaks of 98, 135 and 100 in the second session against O'Brien, which ended 12‍–‍4, and he only needed one more frame at the resumption to secure victory, and he took it at the first chance. "I felt I wasn't going to miss," said Higgins, who was praised by his rival for being "brilliant".

Robertson faced O'Sullivan, whom he had defeated en route to both of his tournament wins during the season, 5‍–‍1 in the quarter-finals of the Grand Prix and 5‍–‍4 at the same stage of the Welsh Open. With breaks of 87 for O'Sullivan and of 104 for Robertson, the first two frames were shared, but Robertson went on to miss some pots, fell behind and O'Sullivan wrapped up a four-frame cushion at the end of the first session with another century break. At the resumption, O'Sullivan compiled another century to go 8‍–‍3 in front, but Robertson replied winning six frames on the trot, featuring breaks of 53, 77, 140 and 117. O'Sullivan then compiled breaks of 129, 96, 52 and 88 for a 13‍–‍10 win. In his match against Ebdon, who admitted to "never" turning up during the event, Selby compiled consecutive century breaks of 100, 122 and 119 in the second session to go into the last one with a 10‍–‍6 lead. Further centuries of 130 and 116 put Selby one away from victory. Ebdon replied with a break of 97, but Selby claimed victory with another half-century. "My preparation was meticulous and I expected to play a lot better," lamented Ebdon.

=== Quarter-finals ===
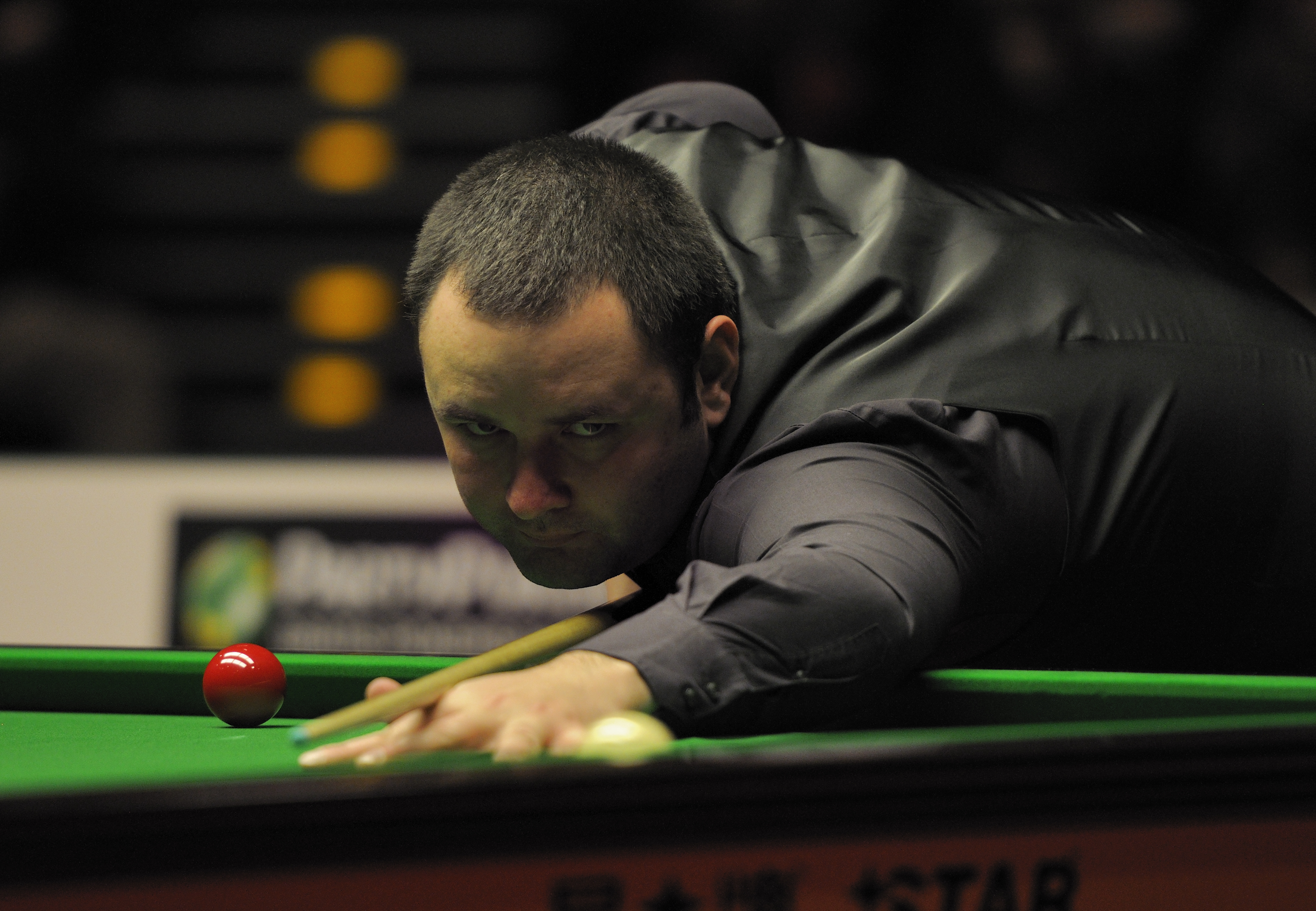
Stephen Maguire (pictured in 2012), playing Anthony Hamilton in his first-ever appearance in the quarter-finals of the World Championship, produced four century breaks for a 13‍–‍7 win.

The quarter-finals of the event were played as the best of 25 frames, held over three sessions, between 1 and 2 May. Maguire, who faced Hamilton, had had a trophyless season coming into the World Championship, but he was still pleased with the good results he had got. Maguire was playing in the quarter-finals for the first time, having been defeated in the first round in both 2004 and 2005 and in the second round in 2006. Century breaks of 106 and 143 ensured Maguire a 9‍–‍7 lead going into the final session. In the last session, Maguire produced a break of 96 and then compiled further centuries of 137 and 108 to secure a place in the semi-finals. "He was better all the way through the match," conceded Hamilton. Higgins took a 3‍–‍1 lead against O'Sullivan, who then produced breaks of 54, 65 and 60 to draw level at the end of the first session. Higgins dominated the second session and this allowed him to put himself 11‍–‍5 ahead, compiling the 350th century break of his career in the process. O'Sullivan launched a comeback in the final session, but Higgins held it off and, in his own words, kept his "composure at the end" to seal a 13‍–‍9 victory. "Obviously he was the favourite, he's a great player, he's won everything, but I fancied winning. I have beat him a few times and backed myself to win the match," said Higgins.

The other two matches went into deciders. Stevens faced Murphy in a repeat of the 2005 final, which Murphy had won 18‍–‍16. Murphy trailed 0‍–‍3 and 5‍–‍11 as Stevens notched century breaks of 118 and 108 and further half-centuries of 64, 61, 52, 57 and 81. Despite only needing two more frames in the last session to advance into the semi-finals, Stevens could not prevent Murphy's comeback, who produced breaks of 92, 60, 61 and 94 for a 13‍–‍12 victory. The match was regarded by the BBC as a "classic". Selby, playing in the quarter-finals of the World Championship for the first time, shared the first six frames of his encounter with Carter. Selby then compiled a century break of 121 and opened up a two-frame advantage for the first time in the duel, but Carter replied with a 144, which was the highest break of the tournament, and followed it up with three more frames for a 7‍–‍5 lead. Selby took four on the trot and secured a lead going into the final session. Carter forced the decider with a break of 78 in the 24th frame, but Selby went on to win producing a half-century of his own.

=== Semi-finals ===
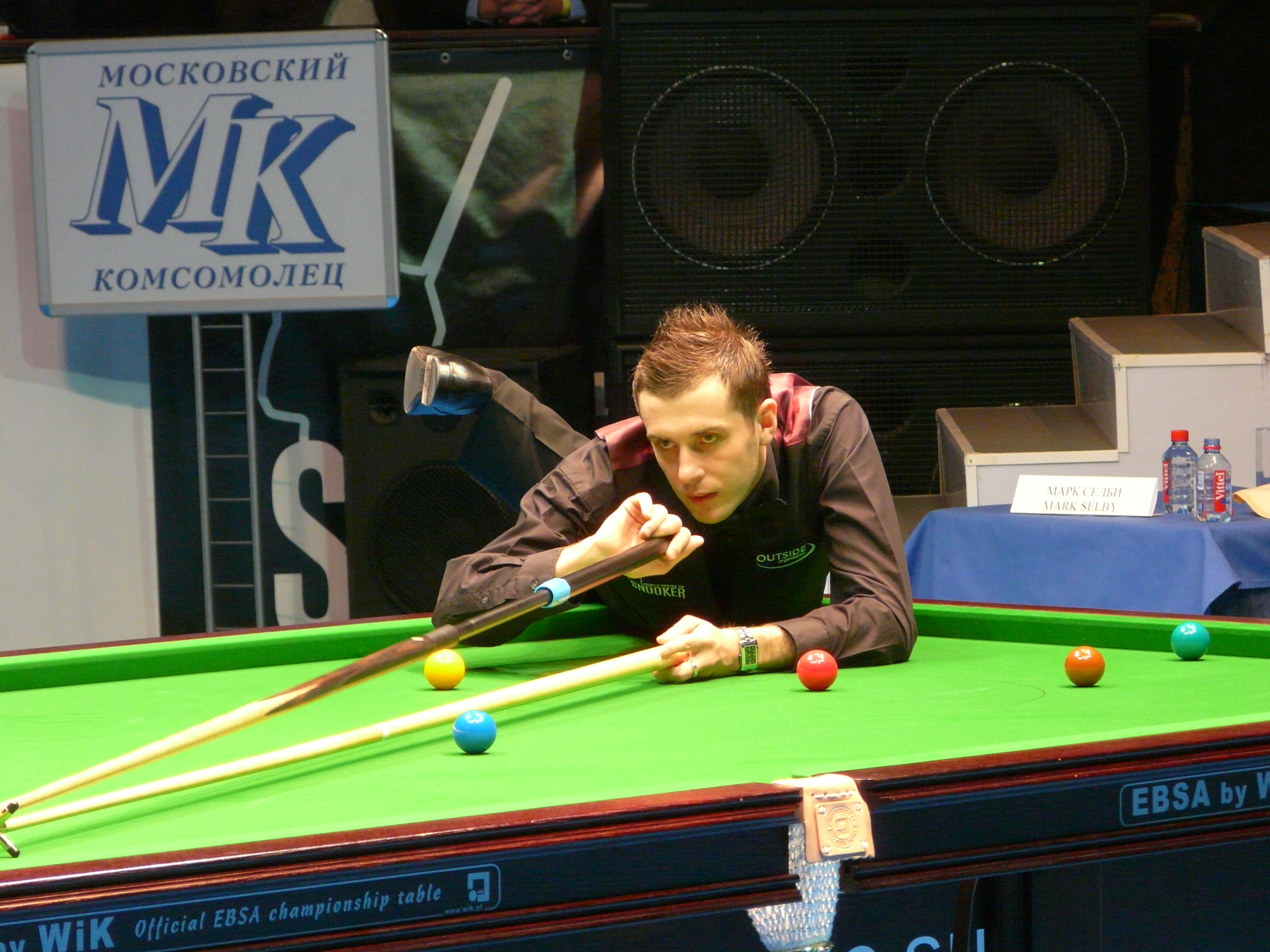
Qualifier Mark Selby (pictured in 2008) won consecutive deciding frames–against Ali Carter in the quarter-finals and against Shaun Murphy in the semi-finals–to earn a place in the final of the World Championship for the first time in his career.

The semi-finals were played as the best of 33 frames, held over four sessions, between 3 and 5 May. Maguire and Higgins produced one century break each as they reached the end of the first session tied at four frames each. The scores were still balanced at the end of the second session. Maguire could have gone two in front at 10‍–‍8, but he went in-off into one of the corner pockets after potting a black that was frame ball. Maguire then took the next three frames and a 12‍–‍9 lead, and he was also 14‍–‍10 ahead. In turning the scores around for a 17‍–‍15 victory, Higgins made two further century breaks. The second one, a 122 in the 29th frame, was the 1,000th century break ever made at the Crucible. Higgins, who was praiseful of Maguire's "unbelievable pots", thought that having given up on alcohol was helping with his game as he was more focused on practicing. "I just used to go out and enjoy myself and not practice for a few weeks. The weekends were all about going for a few drinks after watching Celtic and going to a club afterwards so I was never practising at weekends," he stated. Maguire regretted not having won the match despite having been four frames ahead. "I am absolutely numb. I threw away a great opportunity to win the title and can't believe what I've done," he lamented.

Selby, a qualifier and playing in the semi-finals of the World Championship for the first time, fell 1‍–‍5 behind Murphy, who compiled breaks of 70, 101 and 55. Selby had missed easy balls in the first few frames allowing Murphy chances, but managed to put two more frames on the board to head into the interval only two behind. At the end of the second session, the deadlock had yet to be broken at 8‍–‍8. The last session began at 12‍–‍12, and saw Murphy produce breaks of 101 and 132 and Selby compile a 104, for a total of seven century breaks in the match. The balance was restored once again at 14 each and Murphy then went 16‍–‍14 ahead, only one away from victory, after taking a frame in which Selby needed a four-point snooker to tie, got six penalty points after snookering Murphy behind the pink but then failed to pot the blue to let his opponent in again. Selby came back and, after forcing the second consecutive decider, he wrapped up victory with a break of 64. "I held myself tegether very well, I thought, and now I'm living a dream. This is what I've dreamt of since I was a kid," said Selby after the match. He also thought there was "every chance" he would go on to win the tournament.

=== Final ===
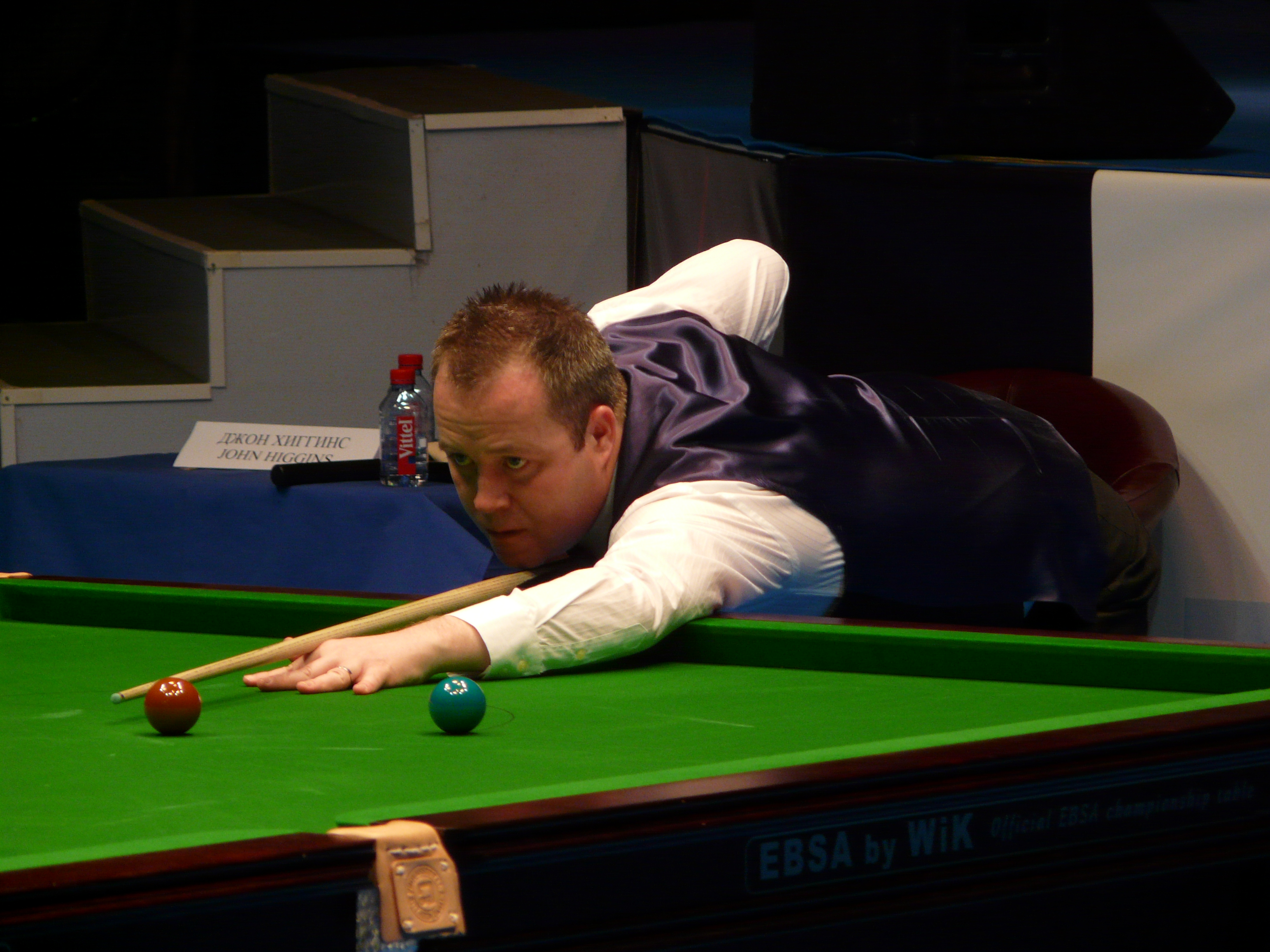
John Higgins (pictured in 2008) defeated Mark Selby 18‍–‍13 to win the World Championship for the second time.

The final was played as a best-of-35-frames, held over four sessions on 6 and 7 May, between Higgins and Selby. Higgins was competing in his third World Championship final, having lost one and won the other one. Selby, a qualifier, made his first appearance in the final. Having made his debut two years earlier, he had never made it past the second round. Selby was competing in the second ranking final of his career, after he was defeated in the 2003 Scottish Open. Eirian Williams took charge of his third world final, having officiated the 2001 and 2005 finals. Although both players scored points in the first two frames, Higgins took them for a 2‍–‍0 early lead. Selby replied with three frames on the trot to turn the scores around, featuring a break of 67 and a century break of 116. Higgins then went on to win seven consecutive frames for a 9‍–‍3 advantage. The second session ended with an eight-frame cushion for Higgins, a lead that had never been reversed in a World Championship final played at the Crucible.

In the afternoon session, Selby constructed breaks of 109, 61, 62, 42 and 56 as he took six consecutive frames to cut the deficit to only two at 10‍–‍12. Two more frames were scheduled to be played, but it was not possible due to slow play. "I was so delighted. If we had stayed on, Mark [Selby] would have definitely made it 12‍–‍12 because I was gone at that stage," said Higgins afterwards. At the resumption, Higgins went three clear at 13‍–‍10, but Selby took three of the next four, including one which lasted 55 minutes, and went only one behind at 13‍–‍14. Higgins then won four consecutive frames, featuring breaks of 57, 129 and 78, to win the match and claim the championship.

The last ball of the final was potted at 12:54 a.m. BST, just two minutes later than in the previous final and making it the latest final ever. Higgins claimed his second world title nine years after he won his first. "To join people like Ronnie O'Sullivan and Mark Williams is a special feeling for me. This is the second one and hopefully there'll be a third and fourth and so on," said Higgins on becoming a double world champion. He also ensured he would be world number one coming into the following season. Selby, who climbed to 11th in the rankings, felt "proud" and promised to "give it a better shot" the following edition. "I didn't really think I could win it, but when I got back to 12‍–‍10, I was believing I could," he said afterwards.

== Main draw ==
The draw for the main tournament is shown below. The numbers in parentheses after the players' names denote the seedings for the 16 seeded players (1‍–‍16). The match winners are shown in bold. The first round draw was conducted on BBC Breakfast on 19 March and presented a day later.

**Round 1 (Last 32)**; Best of 19 frames
21 April
Graeme Dott (SCO) (1)	7
**Ian McCulloch (ENG)**	**10**
21 & 22 April
**Anthony Hamilton (ENG) (16)**	**10**
Marco Fu (HKG)	3
23 & 24 April
**Stephen Maguire (SCO) (9)**	**10**
Joe Perry (ENG)	3
24 April
Mark Williams (WAL) (8)	9
**Joe Swail (NIR)**	**10**
25 & 26 April
**John Higgins (SCO) (5)**	**10**
Michael Holt (ENG)	4
22 & 23 April
Barry Hawkins (ENG) (12)	9
**Fergal O'Brien (IRL)**	**10**
25 April
**Neil Robertson (AUS) (13)**	**10**
Ryan Day (WAL)	5
22 & 23 April
**Ronnie O'Sullivan (ENG) (4)**	**10**
Ding Junhui (CHN)	2
23 & 24 April
Ken Doherty (IRL) (3)	7
**Mark Allen (NIR)**	**10**
21 & 22 April
**Matthew Stevens (WAL) (14)**	**10**
Joe Delaney (IRL)	2
21 & 22 April
Steve Davis (ENG) (11)	9
**John Parrott (ENG)**	**10**
23 April
**Shaun Murphy (ENG) (6)**	**10**
Judd Trump (ENG)	6
21 & 22 April
**Peter Ebdon (ENG) (7)**	**10**
Nigel Bond (ENG)	7
24 & 25 April
Stephen Lee (ENG) (10)	7
**Mark Selby (ENG)**	**10**
25 & 26 April
**Ali Carter (ENG) (15)**	**10**
Andy Hicks (ENG)	4
24 & 25 April
**Stephen Hendry (SCO) (2)**	**10**
David Gilbert (ENG)	7

**Round 2 (Last 16)**; Best of 25 frames
26, 27 & 28 April
(England) Ian McCulloch	8
**(England) Anthony Hamilton (16)**	**13**
27 & 28 April
**(Scotland) Stephen Maguire (9)**	**13**
(Northern Ireland) Joe Swail	8
28, 29 & 30 April
**(Scotland) John Higgins (5)**	**13**
(Republic of Ireland) Fergal O'Brien	4
29 & 30 April
(Australia) Neil Robertson (13)	10
**(England) Ronnie O'Sullivan (4)**	**13**
27 & 28 April
(Northern Ireland) Mark Allen	9
**(Wales) Matthew Stevens (14)**	**13**
26 & 27 April
(England) John Parrott	8
**(England) Shaun Murphy (6)**	**13**
29 & 30 April
(England) Peter Ebdon (7)	8
**(England) Mark Selby**	**13**
28, 29 & 39 April
**(England) Ali Carter (15)**	**13**
(Scotland) Stephen Hendry (2)	6

**Quarter-finals**; Best of 25 frames
1 & 2 May
(England) Anthony Hamilton (16)	7
**(Scotland) Stephen Maguire (9)**	**13**
1 & 2 May
**(Scotland) John Higgins (5)**	**13**
(England) Ronnie O'Sullivan (4)	9
1 & 2 May
(Wales) Matthew Stevens (14)	12
**(England) Shaun Murphy (6)**	**13**
1 & 2 May
**(England) Mark Selby**	**13**
(England) Ali Carter (15)	12

**Semi-finals**; Best of 33 frames
3, 4 & 5 May
(Scotland) Stephen Maguire (9)	15
**(Scotland) John Higgins (5)**	**17**
3, 4 & 5 May
(England) Shaun Murphy (6)	16
**(England) Mark Selby**	**17**

**Final**; Best of 35 frames
6 & 7 May
**(Scotland) John Higgins (5)**	**18**
(England) Mark Selby	13

=== Final: frame scores ===
Final: (Best of 35 frames) Crucible Theatre, Sheffield, 6 & 7 May 2007; Referee: Eirian Williams
**John Higgins** (5); Scotland				**18**–13			Mark Selby; England			
Session 1: **5**–3 (**5**–3)
Frame	1	2	3	4	5	6	7	8	9	10
Higgins	**73**†	**58**†	19	25	10	**97**† (97)	**98**†	**86**†	N/A	N/A
Selby	25	32	**95**†	**76**† (67)	**132**† (116)	0	24	5	N/A	N/A
Session 2: **7**–1 (**12**–4)
Frame	1	2	3	4	5	6	7	8	9	10
Higgins	**75**† (75)	**75**† (70)	**101**† (100)	**70**†	59	**98**†	**78**† (53)	**106**† (106)	N/A	N/A
Selby	0	9	24	61	**75**†	0	55	0	N/A	N/A
Session 3: 0–**6** (**12**–10)
Frame	1	2	3	4	5	6	7	8	9	10
Higgins	36	0	35	4	0	48	N/A	N/A	N/A	N/A
Selby	**73**†	**110**† (109)	**65**† (61)	**74**† (62)	**66**†	**72**† (56)	N/A	N/A	N/A	N/A
Session 4: **6**–3 (**18**–13)
Frame	1	2	3	4	5	6	7	8	9	10
Higgins	**81**†	63	**75**†	22	54	**71**†	**57**† (57)	**129**† (129)	**78**† (78)	N/A
Selby	40	**70**†	2	**82**†	**77**†	33	43	1	1	N/A
(frame 30) **129**				Highest break			116 (frame 5)			
**3**				Century breaks			2			
**9**				50+ breaks			6			
(Scotland) John Higgins wins the 2007 World Snooker Championship † = Winner of frame

== Qualifying results ==
The two preliminary qualifying rounds and four qualifying rounds for the tournament took place at Pontin's Prestatyn, Wales between 22 February and 2 March. The final qualifying round took place at the English Institute of Sport in Sheffield between the 12 and 15 March 2007.

=== Pre-qualifying and Round 1 ===
Pre-qualifying Round 1 Best of 9 frames
Bradley Jones (ENG)	5
Neil Selman (ENG)	0
Del Smith (ENG)	5
Tony Knowles (ENG)	4

Pre-qualifying Round 2 Best of 19 frames
Bradley Jones (ENG)	5
Stephen Ormerod (ENG)	0
Les Dodd (ENG)	w/o
David Singh (IND)	w/d
Ali Bassiri (ENG)	0
Phil Seaton (ENG)	5
Del Smith (ENG)	5
Barry Stark (ENG)	0

Qualifying Round 1 Best of 19 frames
Issara Kachaiwong (THA)	8
Bradley Jones (ENG)	10
James Leadbetter (ENG)	10
Les Dodd (ENG)	8
Roy Stolk (NLD)	10
Phil Seaton (ENG)	7
Ben Woollaston (ENG)	10
(England) Del Smith	3

=== Rounds 2–5 ===
Round 2 Best of 19 frames
Alfie Burden (ENG)	10
Robert Stephen (SCO)	9
Liu Song (CHN)	10
Dene O'Kane (NZL)	3
Judd Trump (ENG)	10
Bradley Jones (ENG)	8
Tian Pengfei (CHN)	10
Roy Stolk (NLD)	2
Mark Joyce (ENG)	10
Mohammed Shehab (UAE)	6
Paul Wykes (ENG)	3
Alex Borg (MLT)	10
Lee Page (ENG)	10
(Northern Ireland) Dermot McGlinchey	1
Matthew Couch (ENG)	10
Jamie Jones (WAL)	5
Ian Preece (WAL)	10
Ben Woollaston (ENG)	8
Liang Wenbo (CHN)	10
Jeff Cundy (ENG)	5
Paul Davison (ENG)	10
Peter Lines (ENG)	8
Passakorn Suwannawat (THA)	10
Patrick Einsle (GER)	4
Chris Melling (ENG)	6
David Morris (IRL)	10
Lee Spick (ENG)	10
Sean Storey (ENG)	4
Chris Norbury (ENG)	9
James Leadbetter (ENG)	10
Andrew Higginson (ENG)	10
Mark Boyle (SCO)	4

Round 3 Best of 19 frames
Dave Gilbert (ENG)	10
Alfie Burden (ENG)	9
Tony Drago (MLT)	9
Liu Song (CHN)	10
Shokat Ali (PAK)	7
Judd Trump (ENG)	10
Joe Jogia (ENG)	10
Tian Pengfei (CHN)	4
Robin Hull (FIN)	w/d
Mark Joyce (ENG)	w/o
Rory McLeod (ENG)	10
Alex Borg (MLT)	6
Paul Davies (WAL)	10
Lee Page (ENG)	1
Jimmy Michie (ENG)	10
Matthew Couch (ENG)	4
Joe Delaney (IRL)	10
Ian Preece (WAL)	7
Mike Dunn (ENG)	10
Liang Wenbo (CHN)	3
Jamie Burnett (SCO)	10
Paul Davison (ENG)	5
David Roe (ENG)	8
Passakorn Suwannawat (THA)	10
Andrew Norman (ENG)	10
David Morris (IRL)	8
Mark Allen (NIR)	10
Lee Spick (ENG)	5
Stuart Pettman (ENG)	3
James Leadbetter (ENG)	10
Scott MacKenzie (SCO)	6
Andrew Higginson (ENG)	10

Round 4 Best of 19 frames
Gerard Greene (NIR)	6
Dave Gilbert (ENG)	10
Adrian Gunnell (ENG)	10
Liu Song (CHN)	8
Jamie Cope (ENG)	7
Judd Trump (ENG)	10
Drew Henry (SCO)	10
Joe Jogia (ENG)	7
Fergal O'Brien (IRL)	10
Mark Joyce (ENG)	4
Tom Ford (ENG)	8
Rory McLeod (ENG)	10
Michael Judge (IRL)	10
Paul Davies (WAL)	5
Mark Davis (ENG)	10
Jimmy Michie (ENG)	2
Barry Pinches (ENG)	9
Joe Delaney (IRL)	10
Dave Harold (ENG)	10
Mike Dunn (ENG)	3
Jimmy White (ENG)	4
Jamie Burnett (SCO)	10
Marcus Campbell (SCO)	10
Passakorn Suwannawat (THA)	9
Dominic Dale (WAL)	10
Andrew Norman (ENG)	8
Rod Lawler (ENG)	5
Mark Allen (NIR)	10
John Parrott (ENG)	10
James Leadbetter (ENG)	7
Ricky Walden (ENG)	10
Andrew Higginson (ENG)	9

Round 5 Best of 19 frames
Mark King (ENG)	6
Dave Gilbert (ENG)	10
Michael Holt (ENG)	10
Adrian Gunnell (ENG)	7
James Wattana (THA)	5
Judd Trump (ENG)	10
Joe Perry (ENG)	10
Drew Henry (SCO)	5
Stuart Bingham (ENG)	5
Fergal O'Brien (IRL)	10
Andy Hicks (ENG)	10
Rory McLeod (ENG)	4
Marco Fu (HKG)	10
Michael Judge (IRL)	9
Ding Junhui (CHN)	10
Mark Davis (ENG)	6
Alan McManus (SCO)	9
Joe Delaney (IRL)	10
Joe Swail (NIR)	10
Dave Harold (ENG)	9
Nigel Bond (ENG)	10
Jamie Burnett (SCO)	6
Ryan Day (WAL)	10
Marcus Campbell (SCO)	5
Ian McCulloch (ENG)	10
Dominic Dale (WAL)	4
Robert Milkins (ENG)	4
Mark Allen (NIR)	10
David Gray (ENG)	7
John Parrott (ENG)	10
Mark Selby (ENG)	10
Ricky Walden (ENG)	6

== Century breaks ==
=== Main stage centuries ===
A total of 68 century breaks were made during the main stage of the tournament, which was joint equal highest in the history of the tournament (with the tournament held in 2002) until 2009. A 144 by Ali Carter was the highest break of this stage.

- 144, 129, 112, 111 – Ali Carter
- 143, 137, 131, 124, 108, 106, 102 – Stephen Maguire
- 140 – Neil Robertson
- 135, 134, 129, 122, 113, 110, 106, 104, 104, 100, 100 – John Higgins
- 135 – Ken Doherty
- 132, 131, 101, 101, 100 – Shaun Murphy
- 130, 129, 128, 122, 121, 119, 116, 116, 111, 109, 104, 100 – Mark Selby
- 129, 109, 105, 104, 100 – Ronnie O'Sullivan
- 129 – Barry Hawkins
- 126, 123 – John Parrott
- 126 – Stephen Lee
- 120 – Fergal O'Brien
- 118, 108, 101 – Matthew Stevens
- 118, 101 – Mark Allen
- 114, 104 – Nigel Bond
- 114, 104 – Joe Swail
- 111, 107 – Anthony Hamilton
- 110 – Ian McCulloch
- 107 – Marco Fu
- 103 – Ding Junhui
- 100 – Steve Davis
- 100 – Ryan Day
- 100 – Dave Gilbert

=== Qualifying stage centuries ===
A total of 61 century breaks were made during the qualifying rounds. The highest was a 145 compiled by Rory McLeod.

- 145 – Rory McLeod
- 142, 116, 106, 101 – Judd Trump
- 141, 107 – David Morris
- 139 – Tian Pengfei
- 139 – Mark Selby
- 138, 126, 112 – James Leadbetter
- 138 – Robert Milkins
- 136 – Stuart Bingham
- 135 – Ian Preece
- 134, 126 – Ben Woollaston
- 132 – Marcus Campbell
- 132 – Jamie Cope
- 131 – Dominic Dale
- 130, 115, 114, 106, 104, 103 – Jamie Burnett
- 130 – Mark Joyce
- 130 – Jimmy White
- 129, 117, 100 – Mark Davis
- 128, 124, 117, 102 – Mark Allen
- 128 – Nigel Bond
- 127 – Ricky Walden
- 126, 114 – Ding Junhui
- 124 – Shokat Ali
- 123, 115 – Matthew Couch
- 120 – Joe Delaney
- 115 – Alfie Burden
- 112, 101, 101 – Joe Jogia
- 112 – Passakorn Suwannawat
- 111, 106 – Bradley Jones
- 110, 104 – Dave Gilbert
- 105 – Liang Wenbo
- 104 – Dave Harold
- 104 – Andy Hicks
- 104 – Issara Kachaiwong
- 103 – Jimmy Michie
- 103 – Liu Song
- 102 – Ian McCulloch
- 101 – Roy Stolk
- 100 – Scott MacKenzie
