= 2006 UK Championship =

Snooker tournament

2006 Maplin UK Championship
Tournament information
- Dates: 4–17 December 2006
- Venue: Barbican Centre
- City: York
- Country: England
- Organisation: World Professional Billiards and Snooker Association
- Format: Ranking event
- Total prize fund: £552,500
- Winner's share: £77,000
- Highest break: David Gray (ENG) (146); Mark King (ENG) (146)

Final
- Champion: Peter Ebdon (ENG)
- Runner-up: Stephen Hendry (SCO)
- Score: 10–6

The 2006 UK Championship (officially the 2006 Maplin UK Championship) was the 2006 edition of the UK Championship, a professional snooker tournament that is one of the sport's three Triple Crown events. It was held from 4 to 17 December 2006 at the Barbican Centre in York, North Yorkshire. The competition was the third of seven World Professional Billiards and Snooker Association (WPBSA) ranking events in the 2006/2007 season and the 30th edition of the tournament. It was broadcast in the United Kingdom and Europe on the BBC and Eurosport.

Peter Ebdon won the tournament, defeating the five-time UK champion Stephen Hendry 10 frames to 6 in the final. It was Ebdon's first UK Championship win and his seventh career ranking title. He was the ninth player in history to win both the UK Championship and the World Snooker Championship. In the semi-finals Ebdon beat John Higgins 9–7 and Hendry defeated fellow Scot Graeme Dott by the same scoreline. David Gray and Mark King both achieved the tournament's highest breaks with individual breaks of 146. The tournament followed the Grand Prix and preceded the Malta Cup.

== Background ==
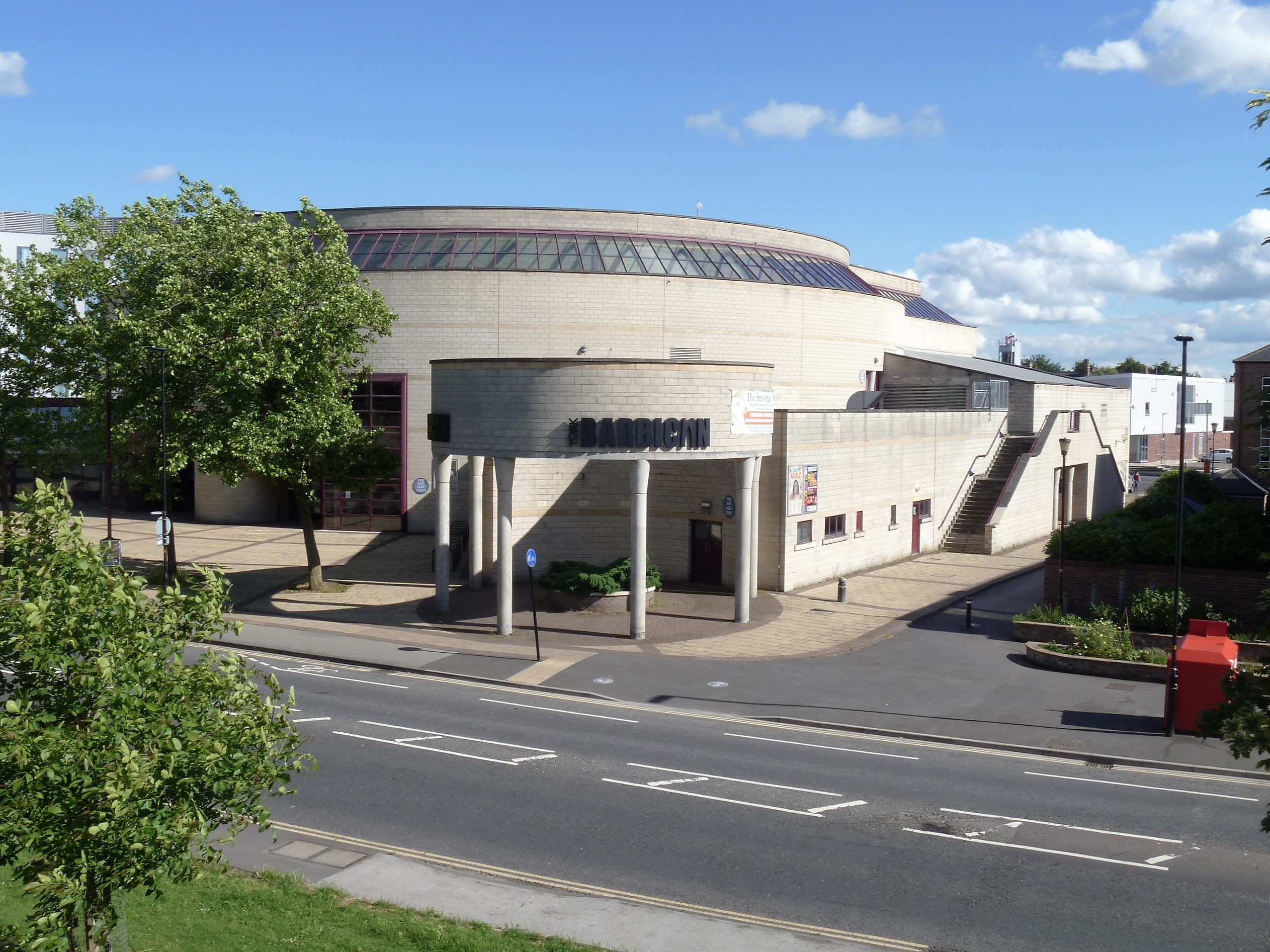
The Barbican Centre, where the tournament was held

The tournament was created as the United Kingdom Professional Snooker Championship in 1977 and was open to residents in the United Kingdom and holders of British passports. Seven years later all professional players were allowed to enter and snooker's governing body, the World Professional Billiards and Snooker Association (WPBSA), granted the tournament ranking status. It is considered to be snooker's second most important ranking tournament behind the World Snooker Championship and is one of three of the sport's Triple Crown events.

The 2006 tournament was held from 4 to 17 December 2006 at the Barbican Centre in York, North Yorkshire. It was the third of seven WPBSA ranking events in the 2006/2007 season, following the Grand Prix and preceding the Malta Cup. The defending UK champion was Ding Junhui, who beat Steve Davis 10–6 in the previous year's final. Sponsored by the electronics retailer Maplin for the first time, the 2006 tournament was the 30th time it had been held. The competition had a total prize fund of £552,500, and was broadcast on the BBC in the United Kingdom and Eurosport in Europe. All matches held between 4 and 16 December were the best-of-17-frames until the final on 17 December.

=== Prize fund ===
The breakdown of prize money for this year is shown below:

- Winner: £77,000
- Runner-up: £37,000
- Semi-final: £20,300
- Quarter-final: £15,800
- Last 16: £11,750
- Last 32: £8,000
- Last 48: £4,500
- Last 64: £2,200
- Stage one highest break: £500
- Stage two highest break: £5000
- Stage one maximum break: £1,000
- Stage two maximum break: £25,000
- Total: £552,500

== Tournament summary ==
=== Qualifying ===
The qualifying rounds were played between players on the main tour ranked 33 and lower for one of 32 places in the final stage at Pontin's in Prestatyn, from 14 to 19 November. John Parrott, the 1991 world champion, beat David Gilbert 9–8 after coming from 8–5 behind to earn a spot in the first round. The other successful qualifiers included Barry Pinches, Michael Judge, Jamie Burnett and Robin Hull.

=== Round one ===
The 16 first-round matches were between players ranked 17–32 and those who had made it through the qualifying stage from 4 to 5 December. Ryan Day came from 3–0 down to beat Liu Song 9–5 with a match-winning break of 130. 2004 runner up David Gray was helped by breaks of 131, 81 and 68 to defeat Pinches 9–2, while Stuart Bingham emerged a 9–8 winner over Rory McLeod from 7–5 and 8–7 down. Mark Selby defeated Parrott 9–1 with breaks of 110, 104, 59 and 57 to lead 7–1 entering the evening session and Selby took less than half an hour in the second to give Parrott his biggest career defeat since his 18–3 loss to Davis in the final of the 1989 World Snooker Championship. Of the other first day matches Mark King beat Adrian Gunnell 9–4, and Joe Perry led Judge 7–1 overnight with breaks of 125, 93, 75, 66 and 60. Perry took 26 minutes the next day to claim two straight frames and win 9–1. Rod Lawler prevailed 9–7 over Anthony Hamilton in a match lasting more than 8 1/2 hours, and world number 35 Dave Harold defeated Robert Milkins 9–7 with a match-winning break of 102.

Mike Dunn took five out of six final frames to defeat James Wattana 9–5 and claim a place in the second round. Gerard Greene received a walkover to the next round after his opponent, world number 27 Marco Fu, withdrew from the tournament to represent Hong Kong at the 2006 Asia Games in Qatar at his country's behest. Joe Swail tied 4–4 with Joe Delaney overnight and both players shared six frames before Swail won the last two for a 9–7 win. Ricky Walden led Ian McCulloch 5–4 before McCulloch took two consecutive frames. Walden then achieved breaks of 68, 112, 45 and 70 to secure a 9–6 win and his second over McCulloch. In the game between Alan McManus and Marcus Campbell, McManus led 4–0 before coming back from Campbell's challenge to win 9–5. Of the other first round matches, Burnett compiled breaks of 110 and 104 in his 9–3 victory over Andy Hicks, while Hull produced breaks of 104 and 120 in a 9–5 win against Nigel Bond, and Scott MacKenzie whitewashed Michael Holt 9–0 after breaks of 65 and 109.

=== Round two ===
The winners of round one went through to face members of the top 16 in the second round staged from 6 to 10 December. Peter Ebdon compiled four century breaks and three half centuries that included a match-winning 124 to beat Selby 9–6. Although he achieved a 146 clearance in the ninth frame of his match, Gray lost 5–9 to the 2003 champion Matthew Stevens, while Perry defeated Barry Hawkins 9–4. Bingham defeated Ali Carter 9–8, a match in which Carter had a frame docked. Carter was tied at 6–6 when he spent the mid-session interval in his dressing room discussing tactics with his coach Terry Griffiths. Carter was deemed to have returned to the table late by the referee Olivier Marteel and Bingham was awarded frame 13. Walden began his match against the 2001 tournament winner Ronnie O'Sullivan with breaks of 80 and 67 before O'Sullivan tied at 2–2 and both players concluded the first session 4–4. O'Sullivan led 7–4 but breaks of 102, 93, 85 and 79 put Walden into the lead before O'Sullivan forced a final frame decider, which he took with a 23rd season century break of 108 to win 9–8.

Tied at 4–4 after his opening session Davis beat Burnett 9–5, while Hull was a surprise winner over Robertson winning five consecutive frames to claim a 9–4 victory. Shaun Murphy, the 2005 world champion, fell 6–2 behind McManus at the interval and could not recover as McManus won 9–3. Mark Williams, a two-time world champion, progressed to round three by beating Greene 9–7. Another world champion, John Higgins, emulated Gray's 146 clearance in a 9–4 victory over King, and Stephen Lee defeated Lawler 9–6. Breaks of 107, 86, 82 and 66 enabled Stephen Maguire to overcome Swail 9–8 in the second session. Five-time UK champion Stephen Hendry led Harold 7–3 before the latter won four successive frames with two century breaks of 115 and 111 to equal the score at 7–7. Hendry's match-high breaks of 88 and 82 in the 14th and 15th frames earned him a 9–7 victory.

Graeme Dott, the world champion, won the first six frames of his match against fellow Scot MacKenzie within one hour, compiling century breaks of 100, 107 and 112 to win 9–2. Ding, fatigued from having arrived in the United Kingdom on 8 December after winning three gold medals at the 2006 Qatar Asian Games, beat Day 9–7 in a tightly contested match. Tied at 4–4, both players exchanged frames with four in a row decided on the black ball. Day missed a difficult shot into the middle pocket from his position and Ding made a game-winning clearance of 57 to win. Fourth seed Ken Doherty held a 7–1 advantage over his opponent Dunn and claimed frames nine and ten with breaks of 87 and 58 in 22 minutes to win 9–1 and progression to the third round.

=== Round three ===
The third round was held from 11 to 12 December. Breaks of 128, 121 and 105 enabled Higgins to lead Lee 7–1 in a match delayed by 20 minutes to enable players and officials to watch Paul Hunter's widow Lyndsey receive the BBC Sports Personality of the Year Helen Rollason Award on his behalf. Higgins made another century break in the second session to beat Lee 9–2. Ebdon moved 6–2 ahead of Bingham despite missing the penultimate red ball when it appeared he would achieve a maximum break but he won 9–4. O'Sullivan constructed a 5–3 lead over Maguire and used several mistakes from his opponent in the second session to win 9–3. Doherty lead Perry 5–1, but the latter responded in the second session to claim six of the next seven frames to win 9–5. Dott ended the first session of his match with Hull 7–1 with breaks of 90, 73 and 66. He won the first two frames of the following session to make the quarter-finals 9–1.

Ding led the first session of his match against Stevens 5–3 from breaks of 111, 100 and 92 while his opponent compiled breaks of 82, 74 and 66. He won 9–5 and spoke of his relief to have won because his Asian Games schedule affected his stability and confidence. Davis defeated McManus 9–7; the match ended 20 minutes after midnight and the final frame lasted 46 minutes. In the final third round match, breaks of 103, 117 and 73 enabled Hendry to lead Williams 6–2. Williams improved his form to take three of the first four frames of the second session and be 6–5 behind. Hendry claimed three more frames with a match-winning break of 92 to qualify for the quarter-finals 9–6.

=== Quarter-finals ===
The quarter-finals were played on 13 and 14 December. Ebdon won four successive frames to lead Ding 4–0 and was 6–2 ahead after the first session. Ding won the evening session's first two frames with breaks of 110 and 82 and came from 40–0 behind in frame 11 with a 59 clearance. Ebdon won frame 12 after a shot battle with Ding and outscored his opponent 212–4 in the following two frames to win the match 9–5. Higgins came from 66–0 behind Perry to claim frame three with a 69 clearance and took the sixth with a 47 clearance after Perry missed a shot on the black ball. Perry accumulated breaks of 100 and 128 in the second session but Higgins won the match 9–3 with a 106 break in the 12th frame.

Hendry won 9–1 against O'Sullivan, a match which O'Sullivan defaulted. Trailing 1–4 and 24–0 in front during frame six after potting the black ball and after missing a red to a corner pocket, O'Sullivan declared the match over. He shook hands with Hendry and referee Jan Verhaas. O'Sullivan left the Barbican Arena after wishing Hendry well in his dressing room. Tournament director Mike Ganley confirmed O'Sullivan had forfeited the match and O'Sullivan later apologised to Hendry and his fans in a statement. O'Sullivan was fined £20,800 and docked 900 ranking points by the WPBSA's disciplinary committee in May 2007. The last quarter-final saw Dott overcome Davis 9–6. He came from 3–2 behind to lead the first session 5–3 after breaks of 78, 83 and 65. Breaks of 52 and 61 enabled Dott to get within a frame of victory before Davis won two successive frames to make it 8–6. Dott's 116 break secured him a semi-final berth.

=== Semi-finals ===
Both the semi-finals were held on 15 and 16 December. Both Ebdon and Higgins were level at 4–4 after the first session that had seven breaks over 60, including 97, 76 and 132 from Ebdon. Higgins led 5–4 but he missed a tricky shot on a red ball and Ebdon cleared the table to force a re-spotted black ball to again equal the score before going 6–5 ahead. In frame 14, Higgins missed a straightforward red ball while on a break of 49 and the frame was taken by Ebdon. He won a disjointed frame 15 to claim victory at 9–7 and enter his first UK Championship final since the 1995 tournament. Post-match, Ebdon considered the victory the most important of his career and praised the quality of the match, "This win means so much to me because I have got so much respect for John. He's a wonderful ambassador for the game. You have to play top class when you play John." Higgins said that considered the game's decisive point to have been when he was leading 5–4 and attributed his loss to a lack of concentration, "But take nothing away from Peter. He played very well all through the match and thoroughly deserved to win."

The other semi-final was between Hendry and his fellow Scot Dott. Trailing 5–3 after the first session Dott won four frames in a row with breaks of 96, 92 and 85 to take the lead as he accumulated 203 unanswered points. Hendry compiled a 111 clearance and a break of 50 to go level at 7–7. Hendry claimed frame 16 with a score of 61–25 and a break of 93 in the next earned him a place in the final alongside Ebdon at 9–7. It was Hendry's record-breaking 10th appearance in the final of the UK Championship and his first since the 2005 China Open. Hendry said additional practice in the past two to three weeks improved his playing, "I'm so close to playing at my best – it's a pleasure to be competing again. Peter is playing fantastic snooker and is very hard to beat over a long match. But I'm just delighted to be in a final and have a chance of winning a tournament – I can't believe it."

=== Final ===
The best-of-19 frames final happened on 17 December. In the afternoon session Hendry took 1 hour and 31 minutes to lead 3–1 with breaks of 51 and 59, but his lead was narrowed by one frame after Ebdon missed a shot leading 66–0 and Hendry did not win frame five. Ebdon moved 4–3 in front with a break of 83, and a then season-high clearance of 135. Hendry ended the first session at 4–4 after Ebdon made a double shot error. The evening session's first four frames were won by Ebdon through consistent potting and him playing tight safety shots, as Hendry's long-shot potting accuracy lowered and made errors on simple shots, which appeared to affect his confidence. Nonetheless, Hendry took frame 13 on the pink ball and won the next with his only century break of the match, a 116 clearance, to be two frames behind Ebdon at 8–6. Hendry missed a straightforward red ball in the 15th frame and Ebdon won it with a break of 43 before following it up with a break of 70 in the next frame to win the match 10–6 and his first UK Championship title.

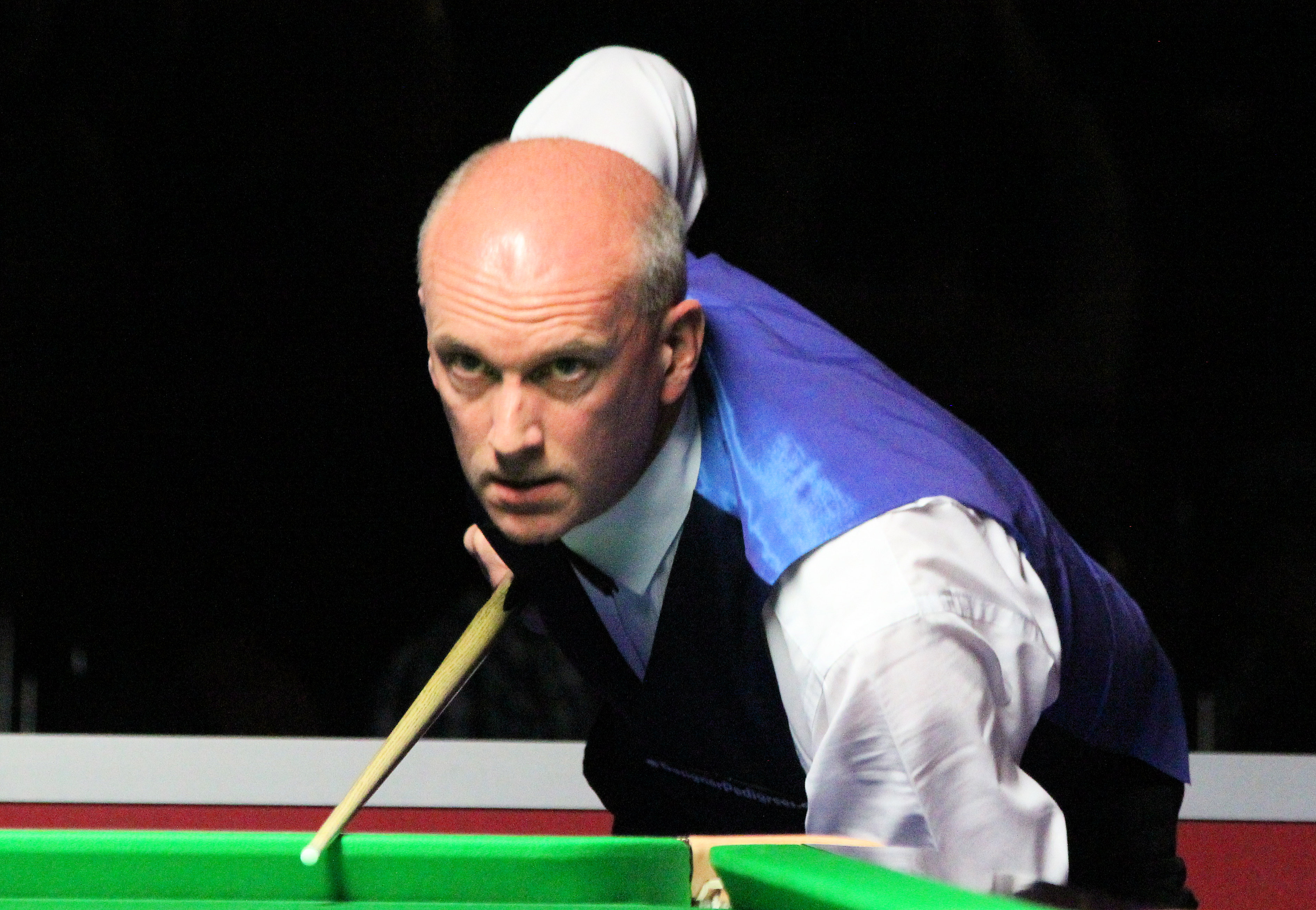
Peter Ebdon (pictured in 2018) won his first UK Championship tournament and the seventh ranking title of his career.

It was his fifth career victory over Hendry in 19 meetings. Aged 36, Ebdon was the oldest UK Championship title winner since Doug Mountjoy in 1988. He also won the seventh ranking title of his career and his first since the 2004 Irish Masters. Ebdon joined Davis, Griffiths, Alex Higgins, Parrott, Hendry, Higgins, Williams and O'Sullivan as the ninth player to win both the UK Championship and the World Snooker Championship. He earned £77,000 prize money, and moved from tenth to fourth in the provisional world rankings.

Post-match, a tearful Ebdon dedicated the win to his Dubai-based family and commented, "This just means so much. It's a tournament I have worked so hard for. I always knew it was going to be tough against Stephen. He played some good safety in the first session, then I found a bit of rhythm and then Stephen inexplicably started to miss balls." Hendry bemoaned his poor performance but praised Ebdon, "I picked the one day of the week when I didn't want to play like that. I had a great chance to go 4–1 up but from then on Peter was by far the better player and dominated the match. For some reason I couldn't pot a long ball – sometimes that just happens. Peter didn't play as well as he can either. We've both had better matches."

== Main draw ==
Numbers to the left of the players' names are the tournament seedings. Players in bold indicate match winners.

Last 48; Best of 17 frames
18	**Ryan Day** (WAL)	**9**
Liu Song (CHN)	5
24	**David Gray** (ENG)	**9**
33	Barry Pinches (ENG)	2
25	**Stuart Bingham** (ENG)	**9**
49	Rory McLeod (ENG)	8
28	**Mark Selby** (ENG)	**9**
42	John Parrott (ENG)	1
29	**Mark King** (ENG)	**9**
40	Adrian Gunnell (ENG)	4
17	Anthony Hamilton (ENG)	7
46	**Rod Lawler** (ENG)	**9**
19	**Joe Perry** (ENG)	**9**
43	Michael Judge (IRL)	1
26	James Wattana (THA)	5
53	**Mike Dunn** (ENG)	**9**
32	Robert Milkins (ENG)	7
35	**Dave Harold** (ENG)	**9**
23	Marco Fu (HKG)	w/d
38	**Gerard Greene** (NIR)	**w/o**
30	**Joe Swail** (NIR)	**9**
63	Joe Delaney (IRL)	7
27	Ian McCulloch (ENG)	6
36	**Ricky Walden** (ENG)	**9**
20	**Alan McManus** (SCO)	**9**
48	Marcus Campbell (SCO)	5
31	Andy Hicks (ENG)	3
54	**Jamie Burnett** (SCO)	**9**
21	Nigel Bond (ENG)	5
50	**Robin Hull** (FIN)	**9**
22	Michael Holt (ENG)	0
59	**Scott MacKenzie** (SCO)	**9**

Last 32; Best of 17 frames
1	**Ding Junhui** (CHN)	**9**
18	Ryan Day (WAL)	7
15	**Matthew Stevens** (WAL)	**9**
24	David Gray (ENG)	5
16	Ali Carter (ENG)	8
25	**Stuart Bingham** (ENG)	**9**
8	**Peter Ebdon** (ENG)	**9**
28	Mark Selby (ENG)	6
6	**John Higgins** (SCO)	**9**
29	Mark King (ENG)	4
11	**Stephen Lee** (ENG)	**9**
46	Rod Lawler (ENG)	6
13	Barry Hawkins (ENG)	4
19	**Joe Perry** (ENG)	**9**
4	**Ken Doherty** (IRL)	**9**
53	Mike Dunn (ENG)	1
3	**Stephen Hendry** (SCO)	**9**
35	Dave Harold (ENG)	7
9	**Mark Williams** (WAL)	**9**
38	Gerard Greene (NIR)	7
10	**Stephen Maguire** (SCO)	**9**
30	Joe Swail (NIR)	8
5	**Ronnie O'Sullivan** (ENG)	**9**
36	Ricky Walden (ENG)	8
7	Shaun Murphy (ENG)	3
20	**Alan McManus** (SCO)	**9**
12	**Steve Davis** (ENG)	**9**
54	Jamie Burnett (SCO)	5
14	Neil Robertson (AUS)	5
50	**Robin Hull** (FIN)	**9**
2	**Graeme Dott** (SCO)	**9**
59	Scott MacKenzie (SCO)	2

Last 16; Best of 17 frames
1	(China) **Ding Junhui**	**9**
15	(Wales) Matthew Stevens	5
25	(England) Stuart Bingham	4
8	(England) **Peter Ebdon**	**9**
6	(Scotland) **John Higgins**	**9**
11	(England) Stephen Lee	2
19	(England) **Joe Perry**	**9**
4	(Republic of Ireland) Ken Doherty	6
3	(Scotland) **Stephen Hendry**	**9**
9	(Wales) Mark Williams	6
10	(Scotland) Stephen Maguire	3
5	(England) **Ronnie O'Sullivan**	**9**
(Scotland) Alan McManus	7
12	(England) **Steve Davis**	**9**
50	(Finland) Robin Hull	1
2	(Scotland) **Graeme Dott**	**9**

Quarter-finals; Best of 17 frames
1	(China) Ding Junhui	5
8	(England) **Peter Ebdon**	**9**
6	(Scotland) **John Higgins**	**9**
19	(England) Joe Perry	3
3	(Scotland) **Stephen Hendry**	**9** (Note: Ronnie O'Sullivan forfeited his quarter-final match against Stephen Hendry by walking out when Hendry was ahead 4–1. The match was handed to Hendry as a 9–1 victory as a result of O'Sullivan's default.)
5	(England) Ronnie O'Sullivan	1
12	(England) Steve Davis	6
2	(Scotland) **Graeme Dott**	**9**

Semi-finals; Best of 17 frames
8	(England) **Peter Ebdon**	**9**
6	(Scotland) John Higgins	7
3	(Scotland) **Stephen Hendry**	**9**
2	(Scotland) Graeme Dott	7

Final; Best of 19 frames
8	(England) **Peter Ebdon**	**10**
3	(Scotland) Stephen Hendry	6

== Final ==
Scores in bold indicate winning frame scores and the winning competitor. Breaks over 50 are shown in brackets.

Final: Best of 19 frames Referee: Jan Verhaas; Barbican Centre, York, England, 17 December 2006.
**Peter Ebdon** (8); England	**10**–6	Stephen Hendry (3); Scotland
Afternoon: 0–**89** (51), **59**–47, 38–**59** (59), 48–**60**, **66**–22 (60), **83**–0 (83), **135**–0 (135), 49–**77** (52); Evening: **68**–34, **79**–33, **52**–7, **72**–35 (64), 51–**59**, 1–**116** (116), **75**–5, **70**–1 (70)
**135**	Highest break	116
1	Century breaks	1
**5**	50+ breaks	4

== Qualifying ==
The qualifying took place between 14 and 19 November at Pontins in Prestatyn. Players in bold denote match winners.

Round 1 Best of 17 frames
**Liu Song** (CHN)	**9**
Dermot McGlinchey (NIR)	5
Chris Melling (ENG)	3
**James Leadbetter** (ENG)	**9**
Lee Spick (ENG)	8
**Passakorn Suwannawat** (THA)	**9**
**Tian Pengfei** (CHN)	**9**
Mohammed Shehab (UAE)	6
Paul Wykes (ENG)	7
**Sean Storey** (ENG)	**9**
**Judd Trump** (ENG)	**9**
Patrick Einsle (GER)	0
Robert Stephen (SCO)	4
**Peter Lines** (ENG)	**9**
Chris Norbury (ENG)	6
**Jamie Jones** (WAL)	**9**
**Ian Preece** (WAL)	**9**
Roy Stolk (NLD)	8
Alfie Burden (ENG)	4
**Ben Woollaston** (ENG)	**9**
**Andrew Higginson** (ENG)	**9**
Mark Boyle (SCO)	4
Paul Davison (ENG)	5
**Issara Kachaiwong** (THA)	**9**
Lee Page (ENG)	5
**David Morris** (IRL)	**9**
**Liang Wenbo** (CHN)	**9**
Alex Borg (MLT)	4
Mark Joyce (ENG)	6
**Jeff Cundy** (ENG)	**9**
Matthew Couch (ENG)	6
**Dene O'Kane** (NZL)	**9**

Round 2 Best of 17 frames
Joe Jogia (ENG)	7
**Liu Song** (CHN)	**9**
**Mark Allen** (NIR)	**9**
James Leadbetter (ENG)	5
**Rory McLeod** (ENG)	**9**
Passakorn Suwannawat (THA)	4
**David Gilbert** (ENG)	**9**
Tian Pengfei (CHN)	3
Shokat Ali (PAK)	4
**Sean Storey** (ENG)	**9**
David Roe (ENG)	2
**Judd Trump** (ENG)	**9**
Andrew Norman (ENG)	5
**Peter Lines** (ENG)	**9**
**Mike Dunn** (ENG)	**9**
Jamie Jones (WAL)	4
Paul Davies (WAL)	8
**Ian Preece** (WAL)	**9**
**Jimmy Michie** (ENG)	**9**
Ben Woollaston (ENG)	5
**Joe Delaney** (IRL)	**9**
Andrew Higginson (ENG)	5
**Tony Drago** (MLT)	**9**
Issara Kachaiwong (THA)	7
Stuart Pettman (ENG)	6
**David Morris** (IRL)	**9**
**Jamie Burnett** (SCO)	**9**
Liang Wenbo (CHN)	7
**Robin Hull** (FIN)	**9**
Jeff Cundy (ENG)	8
**Scott MacKenzie** (SCO)	**9**
Dene O'Kane (NZL)	3

Round 3 Best of 17 frames
Drew Henry (SCO)	8
**Liu Song** (CHN)	**9**
**Barry Pinches** (ENG)	**9**
Mark Allen (NIR)	4
Dominic Dale (WAL)	7
**Rory McLeod** (ENG)	**9**
**John Parrott** (ENG)	**9**
David Gilbert (ENG)	8
**Adrian Gunnell** (ENG)	**9**
Sean Storey (ENG)	8
**Rod Lawler** (ENG)	**9**
Judd Trump (ENG)	7
**Michael Judge** (IRL)	**9**
Peter Lines (ENG)	1
Mark Davis (ENG)	5
**Mike Dunn** (ENG)	**9**
**Dave Harold** (ENG)	**9**
Ian Preece (WAL)	3
**Gerard Greene** (NIR)	**9**
Jimmy Michie (ENG)	7
Fergal O'Brien (IRL)	7
**Joe Delaney** (IRL)	**9**
**Ricky Walden** (ENG)	**9**
Tony Drago (MLT)	1
**Marcus Campbell** (SCO)	**9**
David Morris (IRL)	8
Jamie Cope (ENG)	4
**Jamie Burnett** (SCO)	**9**
Jimmy White (ENG)	4
**Robin Hull** (FIN)	**9**
Tom Ford (ENG)	7
**Scott MacKenzie** (SCO)	**9**

== Century breaks ==
=== Televised stage centuries ===
A total of 72 century breaks were achieved by 27 different players during the course of the 2006 UK Championship.

- 146 – David Gray
- 146 – Mark King
- 135, 132, 125, 124, 124, 121, 110, 104 – Peter Ebdon
- 133, 117, 116, 111, 103, 102 – Stephen Hendry
- 133, 114 – Matthew Stevens
- 131 – Barry Pinches
- 130, 101 – Ryan Day
- 128, 125, 125, 100 – Joe Perry
- 128, 121, 108, 106, 102 – John Higgins
- 127, 110, 104 – Mark Selby
- 125, 110, 108, 107, 100 – Ronnie O'Sullivan
- 120, 104 – Robin Hull
- 120 – Marcus Campbell
- 119, 111, 111, 110, 100 – Ding Junhui
- 116 – Gerard Greene
- 115, 115, 111, 105, 102 – Dave Harold
- 114, 103 – Stuart Bingham
- 113, 112, 107, 100 – Graeme Dott
- 113, 105 – Stephen Lee
- 113 – Joe Swail
- 112, 102 – Ricky Walden
- 110, 104 – Jamie Burnett
- 109 – Scott MacKenzie
- 109 – Robert Milkins
- 107 – Stephen Maguire
- 105 – Rod Lawler
- 102, 100, 100 – Ken Doherty

=== Qualifying stage centuries ===
A total of 27 different players made a total of 40 century breaks in the course of the qualifying rounds of the event.

- 137, 127, 111, 104, 103 – Judd Trump
- 136, 131 – Peter Lines
- 136 – Mohammed Shehab
- 130 – Sean Storey
- 128, 107 – Liang Wenbo
- 128 – Passakorn Suwannawat
- 127 – Joe Jogia
- 126 – Marcus Campbell
- 122, 106 – Liu Song
- 120 – Drew Henry
- 117, 110 – Adrian Gunnell
- 117 – Mark Davis
- 116, 114, 103 – Jamie Burnett
- 116, 112 – Ian Preece
- 115 – Chris Norbury
- 114 – Rory McLeod
- 106 – Rod Lawler
- 105, 102 – Scott MacKenzie
- 105 – Tom Ford
- 105 – Dene O'Kane
- 104 – Matthew Couch
- 103 – Fergal O'Brien
- 102, 101 – Ricky Walden
- 102 – Robin Hull
- 101 – Tony Drago
- 101 – David Gilbert
- 100 – James Leadbetter
