= 2007 Malta Cup =

Tournament information
- Dates: 28 January – 4 February 2007
- Venue: Hilton Conference Center
- City: Portomaso
- Country: Malta
- Organisation: World Professional Billiards and Snooker Association
- Format: Ranking event
- Total prize fund: £200,500
- Winner's share: £30,000
- Highest break: Anthony Hamilton (ENG) (136)

Final
- Champion: Shaun Murphy (ENG)
- Runner-up: Ryan Day (WAL)
- Score: 9–4

The 2007 Malta Cup was the 2007 edition of the Malta Cup snooker tournament, held from 28 January to 4 February 2007 at the Hilton Conference Center in Portomaso, Malta. The tournament was the fourth of seven World Professional Billiards and Snooker Association (WPBSA) ranking events in the 2006/2007 season, the 200th world ranking tournament and the 16th edition of the event. It was the third time that the competition was called the Malta Cup, which was renamed from the European Open, first held in 1989. The tournament was broadcast in the United Kingdom and Europe by Eurosport.

Shaun Murphy defeated first-time ranking finalist Ryan Day by nine frames to four (9–4) in the best-of-17 frames final to claim the second ranking-event title of his career. Murphy beat Ricky Walden, Stephen Lee, Graeme Dott and Ali Carter en route to reaching the final. Anthony Hamilton compiled the competition's highest break of 136 in the first round of his match against Tom Ford, whilst Stephen Hendry was the first player to compile a 700th career century in his game over Robert Milkins. The Malta Cup followed the UK Championship and preceded the Welsh Open.

== Tournament summary ==
Prior to the 1988/1989 season no ranking tournament had been staged continuously outside of the United Kingdom (although the World Championship had been held twice in Australia). The snooker governing body, the World Professional Billiards and Snooker Association (WPBSA), decided to include overseas events and the first two locations chosen were Canada and Europe. The European Open was first held in 1989 in Deauville, Normandy, France, and was suspended for 1997/1998 and 2000/2001. It moved to the Hilton Conference Center, Portomaso, Malta for the first time in 2004 and was renamed the Malta Cup the following season.

The 2007 tournament was held from 28 January to 4 February and it was the 200th world ranking tournament organised by the WPBSA. It was the fourth of seven WPBSA ranking events in the 2006/2007 season, following the UK Championship and preceding the Welsh Open. Held in December 2006, the UK Championship was won by Peter Ebdon, who defeated Stephen Hendry by ten frames to six (10–6) in the final. The defending Malta Cup champion was Ken Doherty, who defeated John Higgins 9–8 in last year's final. The total prize fund was £200,500 and the host broadcaster was Eurosport.

=== Qualifying and wild-card round ===
The qualifying rounds were played between players ranked outside of the top 16 for one of the 16 places in the final stage, at Pontin's Snooker Centre, Prestatyn, Wales. It was contested over four rounds and higher-ranked players received byes to the second, third and fourth rounds. The matches were best-of-nine frames until the semi-finals. Local player Tony Drago was defeated 5–4 by 1991 world champion John Parrott in his second qualifying match that concluded with a final frame decider that Parrott won. The successful qualifiers included Nigel Bond, Fergal O'Brien, Ryan Day, Marco Fu and Stuart Bingham.

In the wild card round on 28 January, held between two Maltese players against two of the sixteen qualifiers, Joe Grech was beaten 5–1 by David Roe in a match lasting two hours and two minutes. Grech took the opening frame 67–49 before Roe won five successive frames with breaks of 46 and 42. In the other wild card game, Andrew Higginson beat Simon Zammit 5–3. Tied 2–2 at the mid-session interval Zammit won the sixth frame to again level the score at 3–3 before Higginson won a further two frames to take his first victory in the primary rounds of the Malta Cup.

=== Round 1 ===
The 16 first-round matches on 28 to 31 January were between players ranked 1–16 and those who had made it through the qualifying stage and the wild card round. In this round, reigning world champion Graeme Dott defeated Bingham 5–3 after coming from 3–2 behind. 2006 Welsh Open champion and world number 10 Stephen Lee won a disjointed match against Michael Judge 5–2, a game in which Lee's highest break was 48. Anthony Hamilton compiled the tournament's highest break of 136 in narrowly defeating Tom Ford 5–4. The match went to a final frame decider that Hamilton won with a score of 70–68 over Ford. Six-time world champion Steve Davis was eliminated the same scoreline to Higginson. Breaks of 54 and 48 gave Higginson the opening two frames but Davis levelled the score at 2–2. Higginson produced breaks of 56, 54 and 48 to re-establish a two frame lead but Davis forced a final frame decider that Higginson won on a 67 break. Ebdon came from 4–1 down to Roe to take five frames in a row and win 5–4. Doherty compiled breaks of 134, 67, 40 and 38 to beat Bond 5–3.

2004 European Open champion Stephen Maguire came from 3–2 ahead to win two consecutive frames without a major challenge to defeat Masters runner-up Ding Junhui 5–2, a match in which Ding's highest break was 68 and his earliest loss in a ranking tournament in the 2006/2007 season up to that point. Trailing 2–0 and 4–3 to Mark Williams O'Brien won a final frame decider on the final black ball. He compiled a break of 58 that eradicated Williams' 55-point lead to claim a 5–4 victory. Hendry, who became the first player to accumulate 700 century breaks with a 127 in the third frame of his match, beat Robert Milkins 5–1. World number four John Higgins was defeated 5–3 by Fu, a match in which Higgins was cautioned for conceding the third frame early while 51–41 behind as he missed a double shot with the brown ball. Coming from 4–1 behind Higgins compiled breaks of 80 and 62 but Fu concluded the match after breaks of 36 and 28. Ali Carter came from 1–0 behind Rod Lawler to win 5–2 with three successive frames and a break of 109.

Shaun Murphy was 4–2 down on Ricky Walden when he compiled breaks of 50, 93 and 53 to win 5–4; the match was suspended for more than an hour because it had overrun into the evening session. World number 21 Michael Holt defeated the reigning Masters champion Ronnie O'Sullivan 5–3. O'Sulllivan led 2–1 but he missed the blue ball and lost frame four to Holt. He scored no points in the next two frames as Holt compiled breaks of 76 and 40. O'Sullivan used two errors from Holt to claim frame seven with a 76 break but lost the match in the eighth. Mark King, whose cue was recovered from Gatwick Airport and collected by a local airline for arrival at the Hilton Conference Centre three hours beforehand, beat Barry Hawkins 5–1 with an opening break of 76, and Ryan Day defeated fellow Welshman Matthew Stevens 5–3 from 3–1 behind. Of the other first round match Neil Roberston won 5–1 against Marcus Campbell.

=== Round 2 ===
In the second round between 31 January and 1 February, Murphy narrowly defeated Lee 5–4, coming from behind to win the match's final two frames for the first victory of his career against Lee after losing the final of the 2006 Welsh Open to him. In his 5–3 win over Ford Dott produced a 135 clearance in the fifth frame but said he was unhappy with the game being on the second table and it not being broadcast on television. Carter progressed to the quarter-finals by coming from 2–0 down to defeat Fu 5–2. Hendry took 82 minutes to whitewash Roberston 5–0, a match where Hendry produced a break of 120 in frame four. Hendry went through to the quarter-finals of a tournament for the 116th time in his career.

Day entered the quarter-finals of a ranking tournament for the second time in the season after the 2006 Northern Ireland Trophy and the third time in his career with a 5–4 victory over O'Brien. The match saw Day lead 4–2 but O'Brien nullified his advantage with breaks of 65 and 101 to force a final frame decider. O'Brien missed a difficult red ball shot to the middle pocket, allowing Day to win with a break of 55. King overcame Holt 5–4 having trailed 4–1 and Holt missing a blue ball in the final frame. In his television début, Higginson went 2–1 in front of Doherty before the latter won five consecutive frames with breaks of 87, 36 and 86 for a 5–2 victory as Higginson scored 17 points during this period. Ebdon defeated Maguire by the same scoreline with breaks of 96 and 59 and a game-winning clearance of 89. Maguire admitted after the match that he was frustrated because he conceded frame six while 34–6 in arrears.

=== Quarter-finals ===
In the quarter-finals on 2 February, Day compiled breaks of 86, 93, 96 and 55 to beat King 5–1 and progressed to the semi-finals of a tournament for the first time in his career. Day said his performance was improved from practising heavily with fellow Welsh players Williams and Stevens and believed his form was as good as theirs, "I don't just give them a game but I beat them quite regularly so I know that its just about bringing those performances to the match table." Ebdon prevented Doherty from retaining the Malta Cup with a 5–3 victory. Trailing 3–1 at the mid-session interval Ebdon won four successive frames.

Hendry won the first two frames of his match against Carter, losing the third and fourth from break of 62 and 42 and then Carter produced a clearance of 59 to secure the fifth after Hendry missed a red ball using the rest while leading 53–1. Hendry won frames six and seven but a 54 break from Carter ensured the match went to a final frame decider that he won. Hendry revealed that a bout of gastroenteritis from consuming a chicken and prawn meal the night before for which he was given injections had affected his on-table play, whilst Carter entered the semi-finals of a ranking tournament for the first time since the 1999 Grand Prix. In the last quarter-final Murphy beat Dott 5–2. Dott won the first two frames but Murphy won the match with five consecutive frames that included a 134 total clearance.

=== Semi-finals ===
The semi-finals on 3 February were best-of-11 frames. Murphy reached his third career final with a 6–3 defeat over Carter. Breaks of 111, 80 and 59 won Murphy the first three frames before Carter took frame four with breaks of 45 and 48. Murphy resumed the match after the mid-session interval with a 115 break following a lengthy tactical battle but Carter got the score to 4–3 from a 69 clearance and a break of 61. Two long-range red ball shots allowed Murphy to accumulate breaks of 76 and 80 and end the game. Murphy said he was pleased that extra practice gave him the confidence to attempt shots he would have tried six months earlier, "I thought to myself that I'm in the lead and I don't need to throw my cue at anything. Often my next shot would be an easy red so it worked." Carter said he was pleased to reach the semi-finals but was disappointed with his playing style, "I scrapped a couple of frames but Shaun is cueing very sweetly and hardly missed a ball. I can't see anyone stopping him being the champion."

The other semi-final saw Day progress to the first ranking tournament final of his career with a 6–3 victory over Ebdon. In a match that lasted more than three-hour, Ebdon commenced with a break of 123 in the first frame but Day took the lead in the third, compiling a 100 century break, as he moved 4–1 ahead from taking four successive frames. Ebdon won frames six and seven to return to contention but Day replied to complete the match with breaks of 91 and 52 during the eighth and ninth frames. Day said afterwards that the match evoked memories of his loss to O'Sullivan on the pink ball in the first round of the 2006 World Snooker Championship, "I thought 'Here we go. The pink's going to cost me again' but I got my head together and the break I made in the next frame was definitely the best of my life. Lots of people have been saying I've got the game to win titles so it's great to finally get into a final. It should be a really good one to watch."

=== Final ===
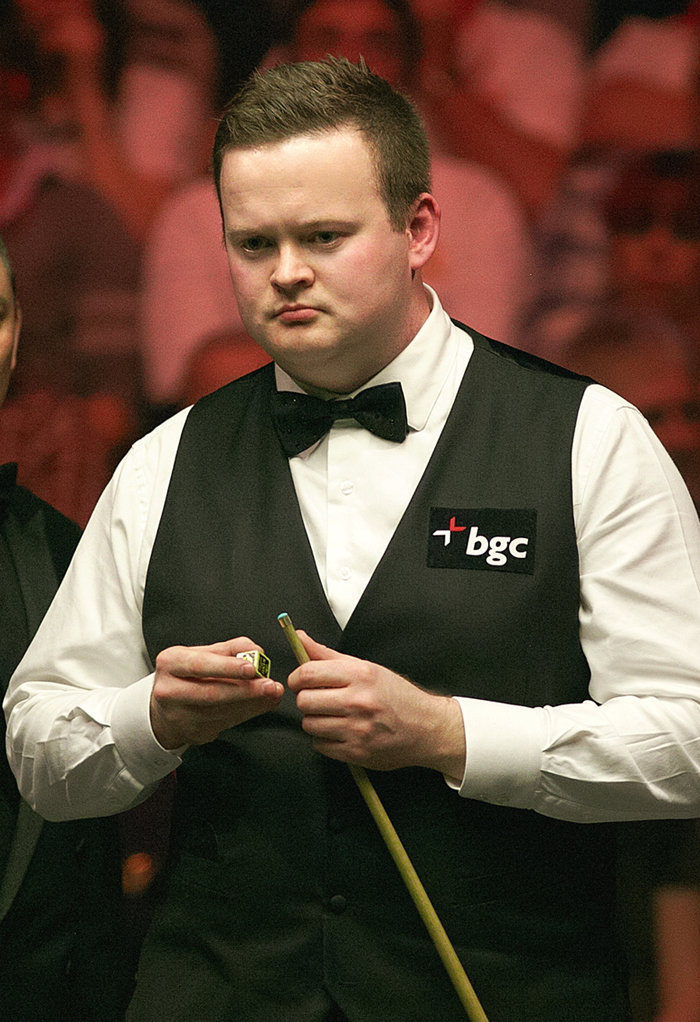
Shaun Murphy (pictured in 2012) won the final 9–4 to claim the second ranking tournament victory of his career after the 2005 World Snooker Championship.

In a best-of-17 frames final on 4 February, and in his third appearance in the final of a ranking tournament, Murphy defeated Day 9–4 to win the second ranking title of his career after the 2005 World Snooker Championship. The victory earned Murphy £30,000, and it moved him to fifth in the provisional world rankings. Although Day lost the match, his form in the tournament moved him from 17th to 12th in the provisional world rankings. The victory, according to Phil Yates of The Times, meant Murphy was an example of having attained a "Big-occasion breakthroughs are the stuff of sporting dreams but attempting to follow up on that success and throw off the one-hit-wonder tag can be nightmarish."

Murphy produced a break of 54 to commence the match. Frame two saw Day declare a foul shot to referee Terry Camilleri, after nudging the cue ball with the rest as it screwed back. He extended his advantage by a further frame with a break of 62 in frame three and a score of 82–42 after Day missed a long-range red ball shot. Murphy clinched the fourth frame with a clearance when Day missed the black ball on its position while at 34–30. In frame five, Murphy missed a red ball along the top cushion, allowing Day to produce a 51 break although he missed a difficult pink ball shot and prevailed through a safety exchange. Murphy re-established a four-frame advantage in the sixth when Day was out of position on a red ball shot while on a break of 20. Day responded to Murphy's opening break of 31 in frame seven with a break of 45 but poor positional play saw Murphy produce a 51 clearance. In the evening session Day produced a break of 66 in the ninth frame and Murphy responded with a 79 break in the tenth. Day lowered the score to 8–4 with the match's only century break (102) and one of 79 in frames 11 and 12. Murphy won the match and the tournament in frame 13 after Day missed a straightforward black ball.

After the match Murphy was delighted with his performance, "I know it's only been a couple of years but you do feel as though there's a monkey on your back. It's a tiresome weight to carry around but now no-one can say that I'm a flash in the pan. I'm a tournament winner in the plural and that's a relief." He cited the additional practice and guidance he sought from Higgins and BBC commentators Dennis Taylor and Willie Thorne in improving his break-building technique after ending the partnership with his coach Steve Prest as a reason for winning. Although Day said he was disappointed not to win he was happy to reach his first career ranking final and was looking forward to the Welsh Open.

== Prize fund ==
The breakdown of prize money for this year is shown below:

- Winner: £30,000
- Final: £15,000
- Semi-final: £7,500
- Quarter-final: £5,600
- Last 16: £4,000
- Last 32: £2,500
- Last 48: £1,625
- Last 64: £1,100
- Stage one highest break: £500
- Stage two highest break: £2,000
- Stage one maximum break: £1,000
- Stage two maximum break: £20,000
- Total: £200,500

== Wild-card round ==
Players in bold indicate match winners.

Match		Score	
WC1	**David Roe** (ENG)	**5**–1	Joe Grech (MLT)
WC2	**Andrew Higginson** (ENG)	**5**–3	Simon Zammit (MLT)

== Main draw ==
Numbers to the left of the players' name are the tournament seedings. Players in bold indicate match winners.

Last 32; Best of 9 frames
1	**Ken Doherty** (IRL)	**5**
Nigel Bond (ENG)	3
11	Steve Davis (ENG)	4
**Andrew Higginson** (ENG)	**5**
9	**Stephen Maguire** (SCO)	**5**
Ding Junhui (CHN)	2
7	**Peter Ebdon** (ENG)	**5**
David Roe (ENG)	4
8	Mark Williams (WAL)	4
**Fergal O'Brien** (IRL)	**5**
14	Matthew Stevens (WAL)	3
**Ryan Day** (WAL)	**5**
12	Barry Hawkins (ENG)	1
**Mark King** (ENG)	**5**
4	Ronnie O'Sullivan (ENG)	3
**Michael Holt** (ENG)	**5**
3	**Stephen Hendry** (SCO)	**5**
Robert Milkins (ENG)	1
13	**Neil Robertson** (AUS)	**5**
Marcus Campbell (SCO)	1
15	**Ali Carter** (ENG)	**5**
Rod Lawler (ENG)	2
5	John Higgins (SCO)	3
**Marco Fu** (HKG)	**5**
6	**Shaun Murphy** (ENG)	**5**
Ricky Walden (ENG)	4
10	**Stephen Lee** (ENG)	**5**
Michael Judge (IRL)	2
16	Anthony Hamilton (ENG)	4
**Tom Ford** (ENG)	**5**
2	**Graeme Dott** (SCO)	**5**
Stuart Bingham (ENG)	3

Last 16; Best of 9 frames
1	**Ken Doherty** (IRL)	**5**
Andrew Higginson (ENG)	2
9	Stephen Maguire (SCO)	2
7	**Peter Ebdon** (ENG)	**5**
Fergal O'Brien (IRL)	4
**Ryan Day** (WAL)	**5**
**Mark King** (ENG)	**5**
Michael Holt (ENG)	4
3	**Stephen Hendry** (SCO)	**5**
13	Neil Robertson (AUS)	0
15	**Ali Carter** (ENG)	**5**
Marco Fu (HKG)	2
6	**Shaun Murphy** (ENG)	**5**
10	Stephen Lee (ENG)	4
Tom Ford (ENG)	3
2	**Graeme Dott** (SCO)	**5**

Quarter-finals; Best of 9 frames
1	Ken Doherty (IRL)	3
7	**Peter Ebdon** (ENG)	**5**
**Ryan Day** (WAL)	**5**
Mark King (ENG)	1
3	Stephen Hendry (SCO)	4
15	**Ali Carter** (ENG)	**5**
6	**Shaun Murphy** (ENG)	**5**
2	Graeme Dott (SCO)	2

Semi-finals; Best of 11 frames
7	Peter Ebdon (ENG)	3
**Ryan Day** (WAL)	**6**
15	Ali Carter (ENG)	3
6	**Shaun Murphy** (ENG)	**6**

Final; Best of 17 frames
Ryan Day (WAL)	4
6	**Shaun Murphy** (ENG)	**9**

== Final ==
Scores in bold denote winning frame scores and the winning entrant. Breaks over 50 are represented in brackets.

Final: Best of 17 frames. Referee: Terry Camilleri. Hilton Conference Centre, Malta, 4 February 2007.
Ryan Day; Wales	4–**9**	**Shaun Murphy** (6); England
Afternoon: 19–**73** (54), 59–**73** (Day 54), 42–**82** (62), 34–**65**, **65**–51 (Day 51), 20–**89**, 45–**82** (51), 23–**80**; Evening: **67**–19 (66), 0–**79** (79), **102**–0 (102), **83**–0 (83), 38–**61**
**102**	Highest break	79
**1**	Century breaks	0
**5**	50+ breaks	4

== Qualifying ==
Qualifying for the tournament took place at Pontin's in Prestatyn, Wales between 31 October and 3 November 2006. Players in bold denote match winners.

Round 1 Best of 9 frames

== Century breaks ==
A total of 21 century breaks were achieved by 16 different competitors during the qualifying stages of the tournament. The main stage of the 2007 Malta Cup yielded a total of 18 century breaks, made by 11 different players. Anthony Hamilton compiled the highest break of the event, a 138, in his first round match with Tom Ford.

=== Qualifying stage centuries ===
- 138 – Mark Allen
- 134, 100 – Mark Davis
- 131 – Alfie Burden
- 129 – Mark King
- 124, 102 – Liang Wenbo
- 118, 117 – Mark Joyce
- 116, 103 – Michael Judge
- 115 – Marco Fu
- 109 – Rod Lawler
- 106, 100 – Tian Pengfei
- 105 – Chris Melling
- 103 – David Roe
- 102 – David Gilbert
- 102 – Judd Trump
- 102 – Ricky Walden
- 100 – Adrian Gunnell

=== Televised stage centuries ===
- 136 – Anthony Hamilton
- 135 – Graeme Dott
- 134, 129, 125, 115, 111 101 – Shaun Murphy
- 134 – Ken Doherty
- 127, 120 – Stephen Hendry
- 123 – Peter Ebdon
- 115 – Ricky Walden
- 109 – Ali Carter
- 102, 100 – Ryan Day
- 101 – Fergal O'Brien
- 100 – Tom Ford
