= James Leadbetter =

English snooker player

Personal information
- Born: 23 December 1980 (age 45)

Sport
- Country: England
- Sport: Snooker
- Professional: 2003/2004, 2006/2007
- Highest ranking: 76 (2006/2007)

James Leadbetter (born 23 December 1980) is an English former professional snooker player.

== Career ==
Leadbetter was born in 1980, and turned professional in 2003. His début season was without any success, and he dropped off the main tour at the end of the 2003/2004 season, but regained his place in 2006.

The highlight of the 2006/2007 season was a run to the last 64 of the 2007 World Championship, where Leadbetter defeated retired professional Les Dodd 10–8, Chris Norbury 10–9 and Stuart Pettman 10–3, before being defeated 7–10 by former World Champion John Parrott, who that year would reach the last 16 in his final appearance at the Crucible Theatre.

These performances earned Leadbetter £4,500 and ranked him 76th in the world, but this was not enough for him to retain his place on tour for the 2007/2008 season, and he immediately became an amateur once more. His subsequent attempts to re-qualify as a professional that season were unsuccessful, despite a run to the semi-final of one PIOS event in 2008, where he was defeated by Simon Bedford.

== Performance and rankings timeline ==
Tournament	2001/ 02	2002/ 03	2003/ 04	2004/ 05	2006/ 07	2010/ 11
Ranking (Note: It shows the ranking at the beginning of the season)	(Note: He was an amateur)		(Note: New players on the Main Tour don't have a ranking)			
Ranking tournaments
World Open (Note: The event was called the LG Cup (2001/2002–2003/2004) and the Grand Prix (2004/2005, 2006/2007))	A	A	LQ	A	LQ	A
UK Championship	A	A	LQ	A	LQ	A
Welsh Open	A	A	LQ	A	LQ	A
Players Tour Championship Grand Final	Tournament Not Held					DNQ
China Open	A	Not Held		A	LQ	A
World Championship	LQ	LQ	LQ	LQ	LQ	A
Non-ranking tournaments
The Masters	LQ	LQ	LQ	A	LQ	A
Former ranking tournaments
Players Championship (Note: The event was called the Scottish Open (2001/2002–2002/2003))	A	A	LQ	Tournament Not Held		
British Open	A	A	LQ	A	Not Held	
Irish Masters	NR	A	LQ	A	NR	NH
Northern Ireland Trophy	Tournament Not Held				LQ	NH
Malta Cup (Note: The event was called the European Open (2001/2002–2003/2004))	A	A	LQ	A	LQ	NH
Former non-ranking tournaments
Merseyside Professional Championship	A	A	A	1R	Not Held	

Performance Table Legend
LQ	lost in the qualifying draw	#R	lost in the early rounds of the tournament (WR = Wildcard round, RR = Round robin)	QF	lost in the quarter-finals
SF	lost in the semi-finals	F	lost in the final	W	won the tournament
DNQ	did not qualify for the tournament	A	did not participate in the tournament	WD	withdrew from the tournament

NH / Not Held	means an event was not held.
NR / Non-Ranking Event	means an event is/was no longer a ranking event.
R / Ranking Event	means an event is/was a ranking event.
MR / Minor-Ranking Event	means an event is/was a minor-ranking event.
PA / Pro-am Event	means an event is/was a pro-am event.

== Career finals ==
=== Non-ranking finals: 1 ===
Outcome	No.	Year	Championship	Opponent in the final	Score
Runner-up	1.	2003	Challenge Tour - Event 4	(England) Kurt Maflin	2–6

=== Amateur finals: 2 (1 title) ===
Outcome	No.	Year	Championship	Opponent in the final	Score
Runner-up	1.	2005	PIOS – Event 2	(England) Mark Joyce	3–6
Winner	1.	2013	Snookerbacker Classic 2014 - Qualifier 7 - Leeds	(England) Sydney Wilson	4–3
