= Maximum and century breaks made by Judd Trump =

Judd Trump has made nine maximum breaks and more than 1,000 century breaks in the professional sport of snooker.

== Maximum breaks ==
Trump has made nine official maximum breaks in professional competition.

No.	Date	Tournament	Opponent	Round	Ref.
1	15 November 2013	European Tour 2013/2014 – Event 7	Mark Selby	Last 32	
2	6 February 2015	2015 German Masters	Mark Selby	Quarter-final	
3	30 March 2017	2017 China Open	Tian Pengfei	Last 16	
4	21 December 2018	2019 German Masters qualifying	Lukas Kleckers	Last 64	
5	18 November 2020	2020 Northern Ireland Open	Gao Yang	Last 64	
6	13 March 2022	2022 Turkish Masters	Matthew Selt	Final	
7	6 November 2022	2022 Champion of Champions	Ronnie O'Sullivan	Final	
8	29 November 2022	2022 Scottish Open	Mitchell Mann	Last 64	
9	7 October 2025	2025 Xi'an Grand Prix	Ng On-yee	Qualifying draw	

== Century breaks ==
Trump joined the professional circuit at the start of the 2005–06 snooker season. He won his first professional match and made his first century on 7 November 2005, in the first qualifying round of the 2006 Malta Cup. The match was against Alfie Burden, and was played at Pontins in Prestatyn, Wales, several weeks before the main event. Trump compiled his first two centuries at the main stages of a ranking event on 11 February 2008, in his last-48 defeat of Joe Swail at the Welsh Open. His 100th career century was recorded in the final of the 2011 China Open against Mark Selby. Trump's 300th century was in a last-64 match against Fraser Patrick at the 2014 UK Championship, and his 400th against Ronnie O'Sullivan in the final of the 2016 European Masters; Trump made three centuries in the match, the third of these being his 400th.

He made his 500th career century in the 2018 Championship League, while playing against Liang Wenbo on the first day of the Group 4 matches. His 600th was compiled on the second day of the Winners' Group of the 2019 Championship League, in his match against Martin Gould. Trump's 700th century was recorded within a year of his 600th, on the first day of the Winners' Group of the 2019–20 Championship League, in his round-robin match against Anthony McGill. He became the fifth player to reach that milestone, after Stephen Hendry, Ronnie O'Sullivan, John Higgins and Neil Robertson. He made his 750th century at the 2020 UK Championship, in his match against Dominic Dale, becoming the fourth player to make 750 career centuries. (Later in the tournament, Neil Robertson also completed his 750th century.)

Trump compiled his 775th century on 8 February 2021, in his Championship League match against Jack Lisowski, to equal Stephen Hendry's career total. He made his 776th century the next day, in his group match against Mark Selby, taking third place on the all-time centuries list, behind Ronnie O'Sullivan and John Higgins. Trump was 31 when he passed the 775 century mark, compared with O'Sullivan who was 39 when he passed Hendry's total at the 2015 Masters, and Higgins who was 44 when did the same at the 2019 Scottish Open.

Trump made his 800th century on 1 April 2021, during the winners' group of the 2021 Championship League, in his match against John Higgins, his 850th on 29 April 2022 in the 2022 World Snooker Championship and his 900th on 17 March 2023 in his first round match at the WST Classic against David Lilley. His 950th century was compiled at the 2023 UK Championship in his second-round win over Jamie Jones. He made his 1,000th century in the quarter-final match against Mark Allen at the 2024 British Open and his 1,100th against Michael Holt at the 2025 English Open.

Trump made 102 centuries in the 2019–20 snooker season, becoming only the second player to reach 100 in a season. His final total was one less than the record of 103, set by Neil Robertson in the 2013–14 season. He became the third player to make 100 centuries in a season in 2024–25, winning a £100,000 bonus for the achievement, and finished the season with a record 107 centuries.

=== Milestones ===
Milestone	Tournament	Date	Age	Ref.
1st	2006 Malta Cup	7 November 2005	16 years, 79 days	
100th	2011 China Open	3 April 2011	21 years, 226 days	
200th	2013 Championship League	21 January 2013	23 years, 154 days	
300th	2014 UK Championship	1 December 2014	25 years, 103 days	
400th	2016 European Masters	9 October 2016	27 years, 50 days	
500th	2018 Championship League	10 January 2018	28 years, 143 days	
600th	2019 Championship League	14 March 2019	29 years, 206 days	
700th	2019–20 Championship League	4 March 2020	30 years, 197 days	
800th	2021 Championship League (invitational)	1 April 2021	31 years, 224 days	
900th	2023 WST Classic	17 March 2023	33 years, 209 days	
1000th	2024 British Open	27 September 2024	35 years, 38 days	
1100th	2025 English Open	16 September 2025	36 years, 27 days	

=== Full list ===
The following table lists Trump's centuries made in professional competition. Only the events where he made at least one century are included in the list. The centuries are not necessarily presented in full chronological order because some of the leagues were played over an extended period and some qualifying stages were played a considerable time before the main event. The tournaments are categorised as Ranking (R), Minor-ranking (MR), or Non-ranking (NR). Centuries made in qualifying matches are noted; these were made at a different venue to the main event.

Tournament	Centuries	Event type	Notes
2006 Malta Cup	1	Ranking	Qualifying
2006 China Open	1	Ranking	Qualifying
2005 Masters Qualifying Event	2	Non-ranking	
2006 World Snooker Championship	2	Ranking	Qualifying
Season total, end of 2005–06 season	6	R: 4 NR: 2	
Career total, end of 2005–06 season	6	R: 4 NR: 2	
2006 Grand Prix	1	Ranking	Qualifying
2007 Malta Cup	1	Ranking	Qualifying
2006 Masters Qualifying Event	1	Non-ranking	
2006 UK Championship	5	Ranking	Qualifying
2007 Welsh Open	3	Ranking	Qualifying
2007 China Open	1	Ranking	Qualifying
2007 World Snooker Championship	4	Ranking	Qualifying
Season total, end of 2006–07 season	16	R: 15 NR: 1	
Career total, end of 2006–07 season	22	R: 19 NR: 3	
2007 Shanghai Masters	2	Ranking	Qualifying
2007 Masters Qualifying Event	1	Non-ranking	
2007 Grand Prix	2	Ranking	Qualifying
2008 Welsh Open	3	Ranking	1 in qualifying
Season total, end of 2007–08 season	8	R: 7 NR: 1	
Career total, end of 2007–08 season	30	R: 26 NR: 4	
2008 Shanghai Masters	1	Ranking	Qualifying
2008 Bahrain Championship	3	Ranking	Qualifying
2008 Masters Qualifying Event	3	Non-ranking	
2008 UK Championship	4	Ranking	Qualifying
2009 Masters	1	Non-ranking	
2009 World Snooker Championship	2	Ranking	Qualifying
2009 Championship League	5	Non-ranking	
2009 China Open	2	Ranking	1 in qualifying
Season total, end of 2008–09 season	21	R: 12 NR: 9	
Career total, end of 2008–09 season	51	R: 38 NR: 13	
2009 Shanghai Masters	1	Ranking	Qualifying
2009 Premier League Snooker	4	Non-ranking	
2009 Masters Qualifying Event	1	Non-ranking	
2009/2010 Pro Challenge Series – Event 3	3	Non-ranking	
2010 Welsh Open	1	Ranking	Qualifying
2010 China Open	2	Ranking	Qualifying
2009/2010 Pro Challenge Series – Event 5	1	Non-ranking	
2010 Championship League	11	Non-ranking	
Season total, end of 2009–10 season	24	R: 4 NR: 20	
Career total, end of 2009–10 season	75	R: 42 NR: 33	
Players Tour Championship 2010/2011 – Event 1	1	Minor-ranking	
Players Tour Championship 2010/2011 – Event 2	3	Minor-ranking	
2010 World Open	1	Ranking	Qualifying
Euro Players Tour Championship 2010/2011 – Event 1	1	Minor-ranking	
2010 Shanghai Masters	3	Ranking	1 in qualifying
Euro Players Tour Championship 2010/2011 – Event 2	1	Minor-ranking	
Players Tour Championship 2010/2011 – Event 6	2	Minor-ranking	
Euro Players Tour Championship 2010/2011 – Event 3	1	Minor-ranking	
Euro Players Tour Championship 2010/2011 – Event 4	1	Minor-ranking	
Euro Players Tour Championship 2010/2011 – Event 5	2	Minor-ranking	
Euro Players Tour Championship 2010/2011 – Event 6	1	Minor-ranking	
2010 UK Championship	2	Ranking	1 in qualifying
Players Tour Championship 2010/2011 – Finals	1	Ranking	
2011 China Open	5	Ranking	1 in qualifying
2011 World Snooker Championship	11	Ranking	1 in qualifying
Season total, end of 2010–11 season	36	R: 23 MR: 13	
Career total, end of 2010–11 season	111	R: 65 MR: 13 NR: 33	
Players Tour Championship 2011/2012 – Event 2	3	Minor-ranking	
Players Tour Championship 2011/2012 – Event 3	1	Minor-ranking	
Players Tour Championship 2011/2012 – Event 5	1	Minor-ranking	
Players Tour Championship 2011/2012 – Event 6	3	Minor-ranking	
Players Tour Championship 2011/2012 – Event 7	1	Minor-ranking	
Players Tour Championship 2011/2012 – Event 8	3	Minor-ranking	
2011 Premier League Snooker	2	Non-ranking	
Players Tour Championship 2011/2012 – Event 9	4	Minor-ranking	
Players Tour Championship 2011/2012 – Event 10	1	Minor-ranking	
2011 UK Championship	4	Ranking	
Players Tour Championship 2011/2012 – Event 11	2	Minor-ranking	
2012 Masters	3	Non-ranking	
2012 German Masters	1	Ranking	
2012 Welsh Open	3	Ranking	
2012 World Open	2	Ranking	
2012 Championship League	8	Non-ranking	
2012 China Open	1	Ranking	
2012 World Snooker Championship	2	Ranking	
Season total, end of 2011–12 season	45	R: 13 MR: 19 NR: 13	
Career total, end of 2011–12 season	156	R: 78 MR: 32 NR: 46	
2012 Wuxi Classic	3	Ranking	
Players Tour Championship 2012/2013 – Event 1	2	Minor-ranking	
Players Tour Championship 2012/2013 – Event 2	2	Minor-ranking	
European Tour 2012/2013 – Event 1	2	Minor-ranking	
Players Tour Championship 2012/2013 – Event 3	1	Minor-ranking	
2012 Shanghai Masters	5	Ranking	
European Tour 2012/2013 – Event 2	2	Minor-ranking	
2012 International Championship	3	Ranking	
Players Tour Championship 2012/2013 – Event 4	10	Minor-ranking	
European Tour 2012/2013 – Event 4	5	Minor-ranking	
2012 Premier League Snooker	4	Non-ranking	
2012 UK Championship	1	Ranking	
2013 Masters	2	Non-ranking	
2013 Championship League	6	Non-ranking	
2013 German Masters	2	Ranking	
2013 Welsh Open	1	Ranking	
2013 World Open	3	Ranking	
2013 World Snooker Championship	7	Ranking	
Season total, end of 2012–13 season	61	R: 25 MR: 24 NR: 12	
Career total, end of 2012–13 season	217	R: 103 MR: 56 NR: 58	
2013 Wuxi Classic	3	Ranking	Qualifying
European Tour 2013/2014 – Event 1	1	Minor-ranking	
European Tour 2013/2014 – Event 2	2	Minor-ranking	
European Tour 2013/2014 – Event 3	1	Minor-ranking	
European Tour 2013/2014 – Event 5	2	Minor-ranking	
2013 International Championship	2	Ranking	
European Tour 2013/2014 – Event 6	5	Minor-ranking	
European Tour 2013/2014 – Event 7	5	Minor-ranking	
2013 UK Championship	4	Ranking	
2014 Masters	2	Non-ranking	
2014 German Masters	6	Ranking	1 in qualifying
European Tour 2013/2014 – Event 8	1	Minor-ranking	
2014 Welsh Open	2	Ranking	
2014 Championship League	10	Non-ranking	
2014 World Open	2	Ranking	
2014 World Snooker Championship	2	Ranking	
Season total, end of 2013–14 season	50	R: 21 MR: 17 NR: 12	
Career total, end of 2013–14 season	267	R: 124 MR: 73 NR: 70	
2014 Wuxi Classic	3	Ranking	2 in qualifying
2014 Australian Goldfields Open	8	Ranking	
European Tour 2014/2015 – Event 1	3	Minor-ranking	
European Tour 2014/2015 – Event 2	5	Minor-ranking	
2014 Shanghai Masters	1	Ranking	
European Tour 2014/2015 – Event 3	3	Minor-ranking	
2014 International Championship	2	Ranking	1 in qualifying
2014 Champion of Champions	4	Non-ranking	
European Tour 2014/2015 – Event 4	2	Minor-ranking	
2014 UK Championship	9	Ranking	
European Tour 2014/2015 – Event 5	2	Minor-ranking	
2015 Masters	1	Non-ranking	
2015 Championship League	8	Non-ranking	
2015 German Masters	6	Ranking	3 in qualifying
2015 Welsh Open	2	Ranking	
European Tour 2014/2015 – Event 6	4	Minor-ranking	
2015 Indian Open	1	Ranking	
2015 World Grand Prix	3	Non-ranking	
Players Tour Championship 2014/2015 – Finals	1	Ranking	
2015 China Open	4	Ranking	1 in qualifying
2015 World Snooker Championship	10	Ranking	
Season total, end of 2014–15 season	82	R: 47 MR: 19 NR: 16	
Career total, end of 2014–15 season	349	R: 171 MR: 92 NR: 86	
2015 Australian Goldfields Open	3	Ranking	
European Tour 2015/2016 – Event 1	3	Minor-ranking	
European Tour 2015/2016 – Event 2	3	Minor-ranking	
2015 Shanghai Masters	4	Ranking	
European Tour 2015/2016 – Event 4	3	Minor-ranking	
2015 Champion of Champions	1	Non-ranking	
2015 UK Championship	2	Ranking	
2016 Masters	5	Non-ranking	
2016 German Masters	4	Ranking	
2016 Welsh Open	2	Ranking	
2016 Championship League	3	Non-ranking	
2016 World Grand Prix	1	Ranking	
2016 China Open	4	Ranking	1 in qualifying
2016 World Snooker Championship	2	Ranking	
Season total, end of 2015–16 season	40	R: 22 MR: 9 NR: 9	
Career total, end of 2015–16 season	389	R: 193 MR: 101 NR: 95	
2016 Riga Masters	1	Ranking	
2016 European Masters	8	Ranking	1 in qualifying
2016 English Open	3	Ranking	
2016 International Championship	11	Ranking	2 in qualifying
2016 Champion of Champions	3	Non-ranking	
2016 UK Championship	1	Ranking	
2017 German Masters	1	Ranking	Qualifying
2016 Scottish Open	5	Ranking	
2017 Masters	2	Non-ranking	
2017 World Grand Prix	2	Ranking	
2017 Welsh Open	3	Ranking	
2017 Championship League	13	Non-ranking	
2017 Gibraltar Open	4	Ranking	
2017 Players Championship	7	Ranking	
2017 China Open (snooker)	6	Ranking	
Season total, end of 2016–17 season	70	R: 52 NR: 18	
Career total, end of 2016–17 season	459	R: 245 MR: 101 NR: 113	
2017 World Cup	1	Non-ranking	
2017 Hong Kong Masters	2	Non-ranking	
2017 China Championship	4	Ranking	1 in qualifying
2017 European Masters	7	Ranking	
2017 English Open	4	Ranking	
2017 International Championship	9	Ranking	1 in qualifying
2017 Shanghai Masters	5	Ranking	
2017 UK Championship	1	Ranking	
2017 Scottish Open	3	Ranking	
2018 Masters	2	Non-ranking	
2018 China Open	1	Ranking	Qualifying
2018 German Masters	7	Ranking	4 in qualifying
2018 Romanian Masters	2	Non-ranking	
2018 Championship League	16	Non-ranking	
2018 Players Championship	5	Ranking	
2018 World Snooker Championship	5	Ranking	
Season total, end of 2017–18 season	74	R: 51 NR: 23	
Career total, end of 2017–18 season	533	R: 296 MR: 101 NR: 136	
2018 World Open	1	Ranking	Qualifying
2018 Shanghai Masters	1	Non-ranking	
2018 China Championship	2	Ranking	
2018 European Masters	1	Ranking	
2018 English Open	5	Ranking	
2018 International Championship	6	Ranking	3 in qualifying
2018 Northern Ireland Open	9	Ranking	
2018 UK Championship	6	Ranking	
2018 Scottish Open	7	Ranking	
2019 Masters	2	Non-ranking	
2019 German Masters	4	Ranking	3 in qualifying
2019 World Grand Prix	5	Ranking	
2019 Players Championship	6	Ranking	
2019 Championship League	13	Non-ranking	
2019 Tour Championship	1	Ranking	
2019 World Snooker Championship	14	Ranking	
Season total, end of 2018–19 season	83	R: 67 NR: 16	
Career total, end of 2018–19 season	616	R: 363 MR: 101 NR: 152	
2019 International Championship	12	Ranking	
2019 Shanghai Masters	2	Non-ranking	
2019 China Championship	4	Ranking	
2019 English Open	3	Ranking	
2019 World Open	7	Ranking	
2019 Champion of Champions	6	Non-ranking	
2019 Northern Ireland Open	11	Ranking	
2019 UK Championship	3	Ranking	
2019 Scottish Open	3	Ranking	
2020 Masters	3	Non-ranking	
2020 German Masters	8	Ranking	3 in qualifying
2020 World Grand Prix (2019–20 season)	3	Ranking	
2020 Welsh Open	7	Ranking	
2020 Players Championship	4	Ranking	
2019–20 Championship League	12	Non-ranking	
2020 Gibraltar Open	9	Ranking	
2020 Tour Championship	1	Ranking	
2020 World Snooker Championship	4	Ranking	
Season total, end of 2019–20 season	102	R: 79 NR: 23	
Career total, end of 2019–20 season	718	R: 442 MR: 101 NR: 175	
2020 European Masters (2020–21 season)	5	Ranking	
2020 English Open	4	Ranking	
2020 Championship League (ranking)	3	Ranking	
2020 Champion of Champions	6	Non-ranking	
2020 Northern Ireland Open	9	Ranking	
2020 UK Championship	8	Ranking	
2020 Scottish Open	3	Ranking	
2020 World Grand Prix (2020–21 season)	8	Ranking	
2021 German Masters	8	Ranking	3 in qualifying
2021 Welsh Open	1	Ranking	
2021 Players Championship	1	Ranking	
2021 Gibraltar Open	8	Ranking	
2021 WST Pro Series	7	Ranking	
2021 Tour Championship	1	Ranking	
2021 Championship League (invitational)	11	Non-ranking	
2021 World Snooker Championship	7	Ranking	
Season total, end of 2020–21 season	90	R: 73 NR: 17	
Career total, end of 2020–21 season	808	R: 515 MR: 101 NR: 192	
2021 Championship League (ranking)	1	Ranking	
2021 Northern Ireland Open	2	Ranking	
2021 English Open	3	Ranking	
2021 Champion of Champions	1	Non-ranking	
2021 UK Championship	2	Ranking	
2021 Scottish Open	5	Ranking	
2022 Championship League (invitational)	2	Non-ranking	
2022 Masters	3	Non-ranking	
2022 German Masters	3	Ranking	2 in qualifying
2022 European Masters (2021–22 season)	3	Ranking	
2022 Welsh Open	5	Ranking	
2022 Turkish Masters	5	Ranking	
2022 Tour Championship	2	Ranking	
2022 World Snooker Championship	11	Ranking	
Season total, end of 2021–22 season	48	R: 42 NR: 6	
Career total, end of 2021–22 season	856	R: 557 MR: 101 NR: 198	
2022 European Masters (2022–23 season)	3	Ranking	
2022 British Open	4	Ranking	
2022 Hong Kong Masters	2	Non-ranking	
2022 Northern Ireland Open	2	Ranking	
2022 Champion of Champions	4	Non-ranking	
2023 German Masters	1	Ranking	Qualifying
2022 Scottish Open	4	Ranking	
2022 English Open	2	Ranking	
2023 Masters	5	Non-ranking	
2023 World Grand Prix	6	Ranking	
2023 Championship League (invitational)	10	Non-ranking	
2023 WST Classic	2	Ranking	
Season total, end of 2022–23 season	45	R: 24 NR: 21	
Career total, end of 2022–23 season	901	R: 581 MR: 101 NR: 219	
2023 Championship League (ranking)	6	Ranking	
2023 European Masters	8	Ranking	
2023 British Open	3	Ranking	
2023 English Open	7	Ranking	
2023 Wuhan Open	8	Ranking	
2023 Northern Ireland Open	8	Ranking	
2023 International Championship	3	Ranking	
2023 Champion of Champions	3	Non-ranking	
2023 UK Championship	6	Ranking	
2023 Scottish Open	1	Ranking	
2024 Masters	2	Non-ranking	
2024 World Grand Prix	2	Ranking	
2024 German Masters	9	Ranking	
2024 Players Championship	2	Ranking	
2024 World Open	8	Ranking	
2024 World Snooker Championship	3	Ranking	
Season total, end of 2023–24 season	79	R: 74 NR: 5	
Career total, end of 2023–24 season	980	R: 655 MR: 101 NR: 224	
2024 Shanghai Masters	10	Non-ranking	
2024 Xi'an Grand Prix	2	Ranking	
2024 Saudi Arabia Snooker Masters	5	Ranking	
2024 English Open	1	Ranking	
2024 British Open	2	Ranking	
2024 Wuhan Open	6	Ranking	
2024 Northern Ireland Open	6	Ranking	
2024 International Championship	2	Ranking	1 in qualifying
2024 Champion of Champions	1	Non-ranking	
2024 UK Championship	11	Ranking	
2024 Snooker Championship (Riyadh)	1	Non-ranking	
2025 Masters	2	Non-ranking	
2025 German Masters	2	Ranking	
2025 Championship League (invitational)	23	Non-ranking	
2025 World Open	5	Ranking	
2025 World Grand Prix	7	Ranking	
2025 Players Championship	6	Ranking	
2025 Tour Championship	1	Ranking	
2025 World Snooker Championship	14	Ranking	
Season total, end of 2024–25 season	107	R: 70 NR: 37	
Career total, end of 2024–25 season	1,087	R: 725 MR: 101 NR: 261	
2025 Shanghai Masters	6	Non-ranking	
2025 Saudi Arabia Snooker Masters	1	Ranking	
2025 Wuhan Open	5	Ranking	
2025 English Open	3	Ranking	
2025 British Open	4	Ranking	
2025 Xi'an Grand Prix	2	Ranking	
2025 Northern Ireland Open	2	Ranking	
2025 International Championship	3	Ranking	
2025 Champion of Champions	2	Non-ranking	
2025 Riyadh Season Snooker Championship	3	Non-ranking	
2025 UK Championship	4	Ranking	
2026 Masters	3	Non-ranking	
2026 German Masters	6	Ranking	
2026 Players Championship	2	Ranking	
2026 World Open	8	Ranking	
2026 Tour Championship	6	Ranking	
2026 World Snooker Championship	3	Ranking	
Season total, end of 2025–26 season	63	R: 49 NR: 14	
Career total, end of 2025–26 season	1,150	R: 774 MR: 101 NR: 275	
2026 Shanghai Masters	7	Non-ranking	
2026 Wuhan Open	1	Ranking	
2026 British Open	5	Ranking	
2026 English Open	3	Ranking	
2026 Shenzhen Open	1	Ranking	
2026 International Championship	2	Ranking	
Current season total	19	R: 12 NR: 7	
Current career total	1,169	R: 786 MR: 101 NR: 282	

As of 31 October 2026
