= 2022 Championship League =

2022 Championship League may refer to:

- 2022 Championship League (invitational), a snooker tournament held between December 2021 and February 2022
- 2022 Championship League (ranking), a snooker tournament held between June and July 2022
