= 2023 UK Championship =

Snooker tournament

2023 MrQ UK Championship

Tournament information
- Dates: 25 November – 3 December 2023
- Venue: York Barbican
- City: York
- Country: England
- Organisation: World Snooker Tour
- Format: Ranking event
- Total prize fund: £1,205,000
- Winner's share: £250,000
- Highest break: Xu Si (CHN) (147)

Final
- Champion: Ronnie O'Sullivan (ENG)
- Runner-up: Ding Junhui (CHN)
- Score: 10–7

The 2023 UK Championship (officially the 2023 MrQ UK Championship) was a professional snooker tournament that took place from 25 November to 3 December 2023 at the York Barbican in York, England. The 47th edition of the UK Championship, first held in 1977, it was the eighth ranking event of the 2023–24 snooker season, following the International Championship and preceding the Snooker Shoot Out. It was also the season's first Triple Crown event, preceding the Masters and the World Championship. Organised by the World Snooker Tour and sponsored by online casino MrQ, the event was broadcast by the BBC domestically, by Discovery+ and Eurosport in Europe, and by other broadcasters worldwide. The winner received £250,000 from a total prize fund of £1,205,000.

The event featured the top 16 players in the world rankings along with 16 qualifiers who came through a 128-player four-round qualifying tournament held from 18 to 23 November at the Morningside Arena in Leicester. Mark Allen was the defending champion, having defeated Ding Junhui 10‍–‍7 in the final of the 2022 event, but he lost 5‍–‍6 to Ding in the first round. After becoming the first player to win 100 matches in the history of the UK Championship when he defeated Zhou Yuelong in the quarter-finals, Ronnie O'Sullivan progressed to the final, where he defeated Ding 10‍–‍7 to win a record-extending eighth UK Championship, his 22nd Triple Crown title and 40th ranking title. Aged 47 years and 363 days, he became the oldest winner in the tournament's history, surpassing Doug Mountjoy, who had been 46 years and 172 days old when he won the title at the 1988 event. O'Sullivan also holds the record as the tournament's youngest winner—set 30 years earlier at the 1993 event—which gives him the distinction of simultaneously being the youngest and oldest UK Champion.

The main stage of the tournament produced a total of 63 century breaks, with a further 80 centuries made during qualifying. The highest was a maximum break by Xu Si in his second-round qualifying match against Ma Hailong. Judd Trump made his 950th century break in professional competition and recorded his 1,000th professional victory during the event. Ding and Mark Williams scored a record total of 195 points in frame eight of their quarter-final match, breaking the previous professional record of 192 points set by Peter Lines and Dominic Dale during the 2012 Wuxi Classic qualifiers.

== Format ==
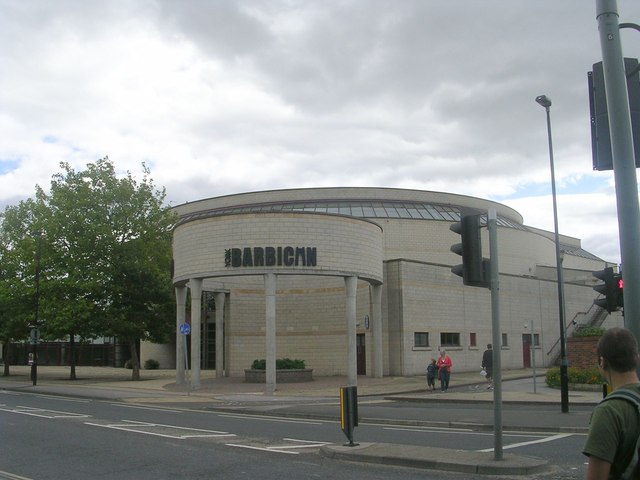
The event was staged at the York Barbican in York, England.

The 2023 UK Championship was a professional snooker tournament that took place from 25 November to 3 December at the York Barbican in York, England. Organised by the World Snooker Tour, it was the eighth ranking event of the 2023–24 snooker season, following the International Championship and preceding the Snooker Shoot Out, and the first Triple Crown title. It was the 47th edition of the UK Championship, which was first held in 1977 as the United Kingdom Professional Snooker Championship. For the tournament's first seven years, only United Kingdom residents or passport holders were eligible to compete. At the 1984 event, the UK Championship became a ranking tournament open to players of any nationality.

The event used a format adopted for the 2022 edition, which is similar to the format of the World Championship. The top 16 players in the snooker world rankings were seeded through to the round of 32. An additional 128 players—comprising professionals ranked outside the top 16, leading amateur players from the Q Tour and other amateur events, and top-performing junior players from the UK—competed in a four-round qualifying tournament from 18 to 23 November at the Morningside Arena in Leicester, with higher ranked players given byes to the later rounds. The 16 successful qualifiers advanced to the round of 32, where they were drawn at random against the top 16 seeds.

All matches were played as the best of 11 frames up to the final, which was the best of 19 frames. The defending champion was Northern Irish player Mark Allen, who won his first UK Championship title in 2022, defeating China's Ding Junhui 10‍–‍7 in the final.

=== Broadcasters and viewership ===
The qualifying matches were broadcast by Discovery+ and Eurosport in Europe (including the UK and Ireland); Migu, Youku, and Huya in China; and Matchroom.live in all other territories. Round 4 of qualifying, called "Judgement Day", was also streamed on World Snooker Tour's YouTube and Facebook pages.

The main stages of the event were broadcast by the BBC in the UK; Discovery+ and Eurosport in Europe (including the UK and Ireland); CCTV-5, Migu, Youku, and Huya in Mainland China; DAZN in the US and Brazil; Now TV in Hong Kong; Astro SuperSport in Malaysia and Brunei; TrueVisions in Thailand; Sportcast in Taiwan; Premier Sports Network in the Philippines; Fastsports in Pakistan; and Matchroom.live in all other territories.

The last session of the final attracted a peak viewership of 2.6 million on the BBC, an increase of 59 percent over the previous year. The cumulative British audience for the tournament—on BBC and UK Eurosport combined—was 14.3 million, an increase of 35 percent over the previous year. Every session broadcast on the BBC achieved viewership figures that were either equivalent to or greater than the 2022 event.

=== Prize fund ===
The event featured a total prize fund of £1,205,000, with the winner receiving £250,000. The tournament was sponsored by online casino MrQ. The breakdown of prize money for the event is shown below:

- Winner: £250,000
- Runner-up: £100,000
- Semi-final: £50,000
- Quarter-final: £25,000
- Last 16: £15,000
- Last 32: £10,000
- Last 48: £7,500
- Last 80: £5,000
- Last 112: £2,500
- Highest break: £15,000 (Note: In addition to the highest break prize, any player making two maximum breaks during the season's Triple Crown events would have been rewarded with a £147,000 bonus.)
- Total: £1,205,000

== Summary ==
=== Qualifying ===
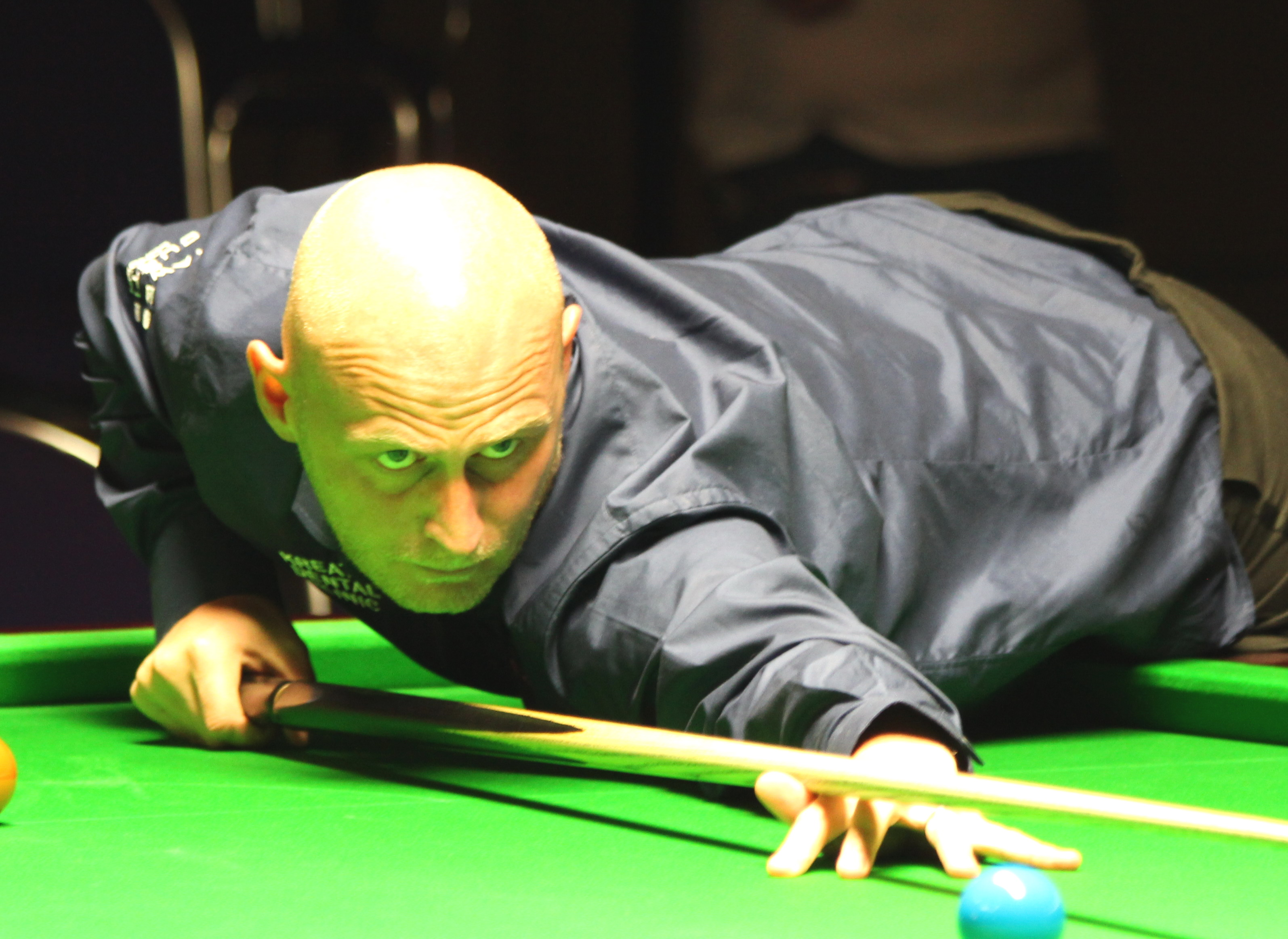
Craig Steadman (pictured in 2015) reached the fourth round, in which he lost 2‍–‍6 to Pang Junxu.

Qualifying took place from 18 to 23 November at the Morningside Arena in Leicester. In the first round, former women's world champion Mink Nutcharut eliminated 96th seed Adam Duffy 6‍–‍3, but was defeated by 65th seed Michael White in a deciding frame in the second round. Xu Si defeated Ma Hailong 6‍–‍1 in the second round, making his first career maximum break in the second frame. Six top-32 seeds were defeated in the third round. The 19th seed Ryan Day was eliminated 2‍–‍6 by 78th seed Lukas Kleckers. The 20th seed Gary Wilson lost 3‍–‍6 to 77th seed Zak Surety. The 22nd seed Chris Wakelin was beaten 4‍–‍6 by 75th seed Ken Doherty. The 23rd seed Stuart Bingham was eliminated 2‍–‍6 by 74th seed David Lilley. The 31st seed Jimmy Robertson lost 5‍–‍6 to amateur player Craig Steadman. The 32nd seed Si Jiahui was beaten 5‍–‍6 by Michael White. Steadman had the best run of all the amateur and unseeded players in qualifying, reaching the fourth round before losing 2‍–‍6 to 34th seed Pang Junxu.

Four more top 32 players lost in the fourth and final qualifying round. The 25th seed Ricky Walden lost 3‍–‍6 to 40th seed Thepchaiya Un-Nooh. The 27th seed Stephen Maguire was beaten 3‍–‍6 by 38th seed Joe O'Connor. David Gilbert, the 28th seed, was defeated 5‍–‍6 by 60th seed Jamie Clarke. The 62nd seed Mark Joyce progressed with a 6‍–‍4 victory over the 30th seed Joe Perry. Three-time winner Ding Junhui, runner-up in the previous year's event, qualified for the main stage by defeating Daniel Wells 6‍–‍4 and Robbie Williams 6‍–‍3.

=== First round ===
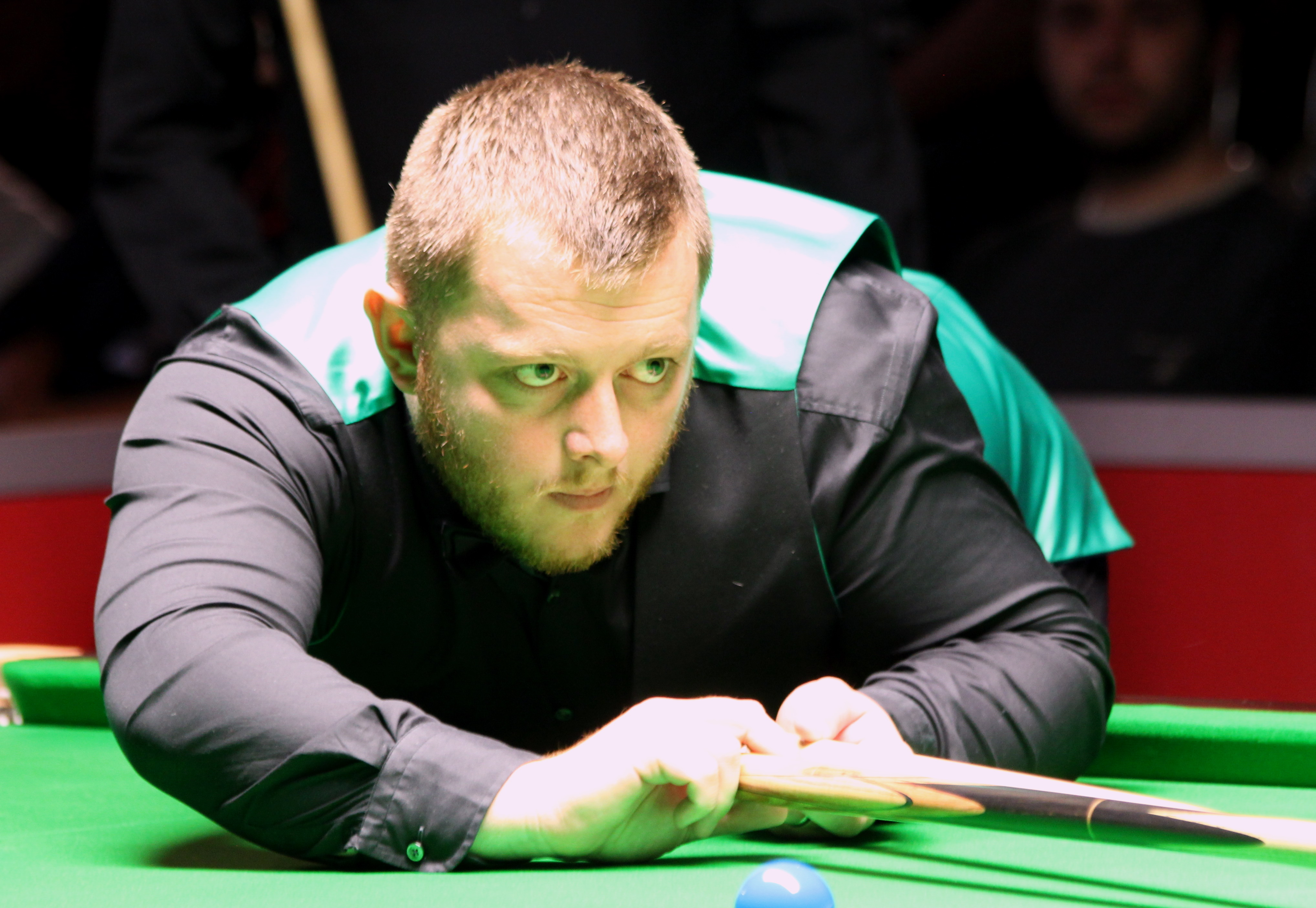
The defending champion Mark Allen (pictured in 2016) lost 5‍–‍6 to Ding Junhui in the first round.

The first round was played from 25 to 28 November. On the first day, Ding Junhui faced defending champion Mark Allen, a repeat of the previous year's final. The score was tied at 2‍–‍2 at the mid-session interval, after which Allen made breaks of 106 and 60 to lead 4‍–‍2. Ding won three consecutive frames before Allen took the tenth frame with a 70 break to take the match to a decider. Allen led 37‍–‍0 before missing a red ball, and Ding made a break of 102 to win the match 6‍–‍5. Commenting on his ill health leading up to the match, Ding said afterwards that he had seen the doctor and taken some tablets. "I felt a bit better before the match. I was thinking I might have to give him a walkover," Ding commented. Mark Williams defeated Fan Zhengyi 6‍–‍4. Jamie Clarke trailed 1‍–‍5 against Kyren Wilson, but won the match with five consecutive frames, including a century break of 104 in the last frame. Noppon Saengkham also led Tom Ford 5‍–‍1, having made breaks of 126, 100, and 127. However, Ford won the next five frames for a 6‍–‍5 victory, making a break of 130 in the eighth frame.

On 26 November, the reigning world champion Luca Brecel defeated Yuan Sijun 6‍–‍4. Zhang Anda missed the 13th red while attempting a maximum break in the second frame of his match against Elliot Slessor. The match went to a deciding frame, which Zhang won for a 6‍–‍5 victory. The evening session was delayed by an hour after a small fire at the venue led to the building being evacuated. Shaun Murphy played Hossein Vafaei in their second professional meeting, following the 2023 Shoot Out. The scores were tied at 2‍–‍2 at the mid-session interval, after which Vafaei made breaks of 100 and 71 to lead 5‍–‍3. Murphy won the ninth frame, but Vafaei made a break of 67 in the tenth for a 6‍–‍4 victory. Matthew Selt made century breaks of 111 and 102 to lead Ali Carter 3‍–‍2, and went on to win the match 6‍–‍3.

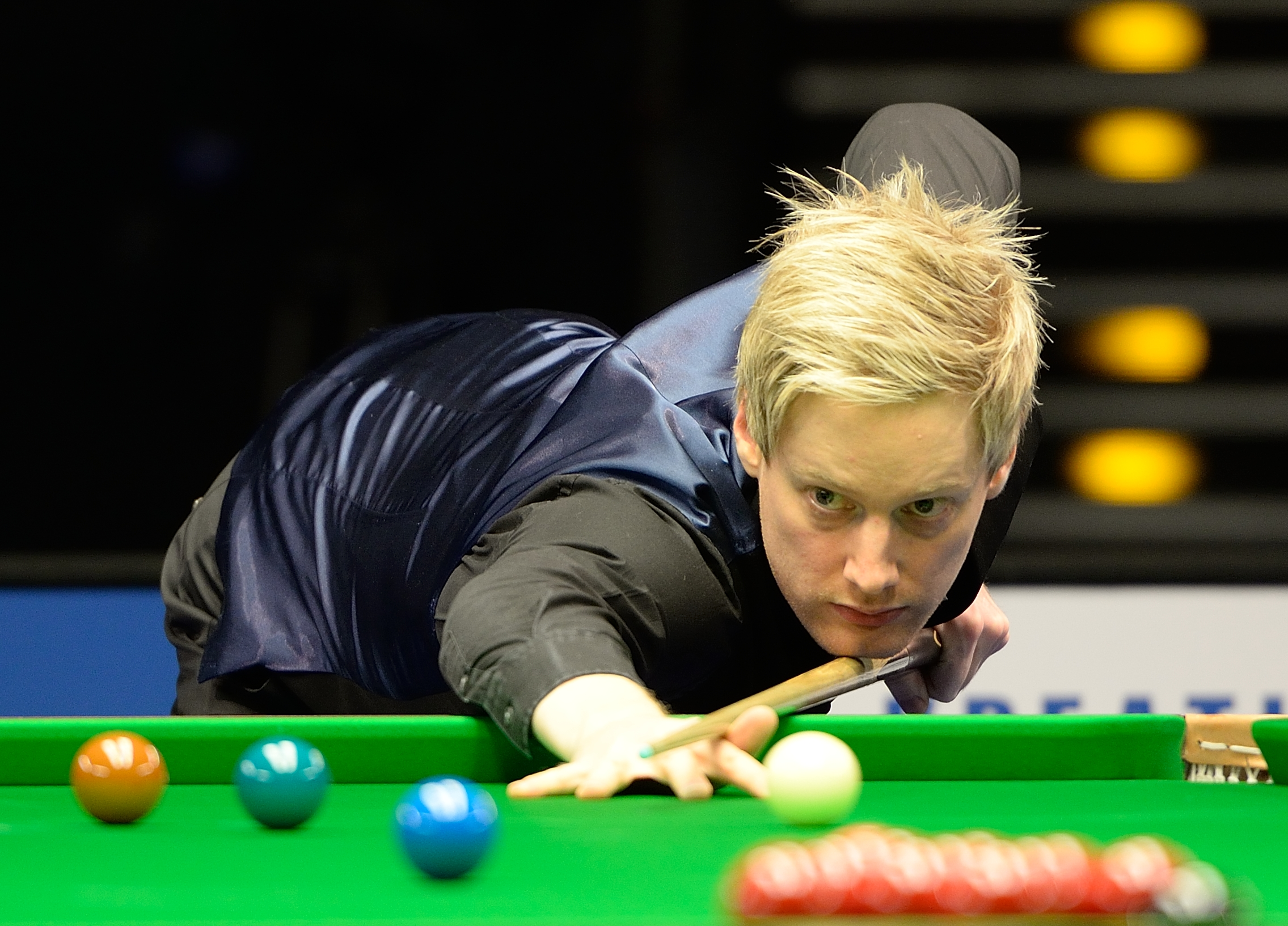
Three-time UK champion Neil Robertson (pictured in 2015) lost 2‍–‍6 to Zhou Yuelong in the first round. This ended his winning streak of at least one professional tournament every calendar year since 2006.

On 27 November, Judd Trump defeated Pang Junxu 6‍–‍1 in their first professional meeting, making breaks of 114 and 124 in the first and fourth frames. After the match Trump said he was playing well: "I feel like I'm a player that is either amazing or terrible and I feel if I can get through the first two rounds then nothing is stopping me. It is quite rare for me to lose in a semi or quarter-final." Ben Woollaston made a break of 100 in the first frame against Barry Hawkins and went on to lead 3‍–‍1. However, Hawkins won five of the next six frames to win the match 6‍–‍4. Mark Selby advanced with a 6‍–‍0 whitewash over Mark Joyce. Jack Lisowski made an 86 break in the first frame and won the second frame on a re-spotted black for a 2‍–‍0 lead over Jamie Jones. However, Jones tied the scores at 4‍–‍4 and then won the last two frames for a 6‍–‍4 victory.

On 28 November, seven-time winner Ronnie O'Sullivan lost the first two frames against Anthony McGill, but then won six frames in a row for a 6‍–‍2 victory. John Higgins defeated Joe O'Connor 6‍–‍3, making a 122 break in the eighth frame. Zhou Yuelong made breaks of 80 and 134 to lead Neil Robertson 2‍–‍1. Robertson tied the scores with a 135 clearance in the fourth frame, but Zhou took four consecutive frames with breaks of 67, 99, 136, and 74 for a 6‍–‍2 victory. The defeat ended Robertson's winning streak, in which he had won at least one professional tournament every calendar year since 2006. Thepchaiya Un-Nooh made breaks of 93, 127, and 85 for a 3‍–‍1 lead over Robert Milkins. Milkins attempted a maximum break in the fifth frame, but missed the last red. Milkins made further breaks of 99 and 121 and won the match in a deciding frame.

=== Second round ===
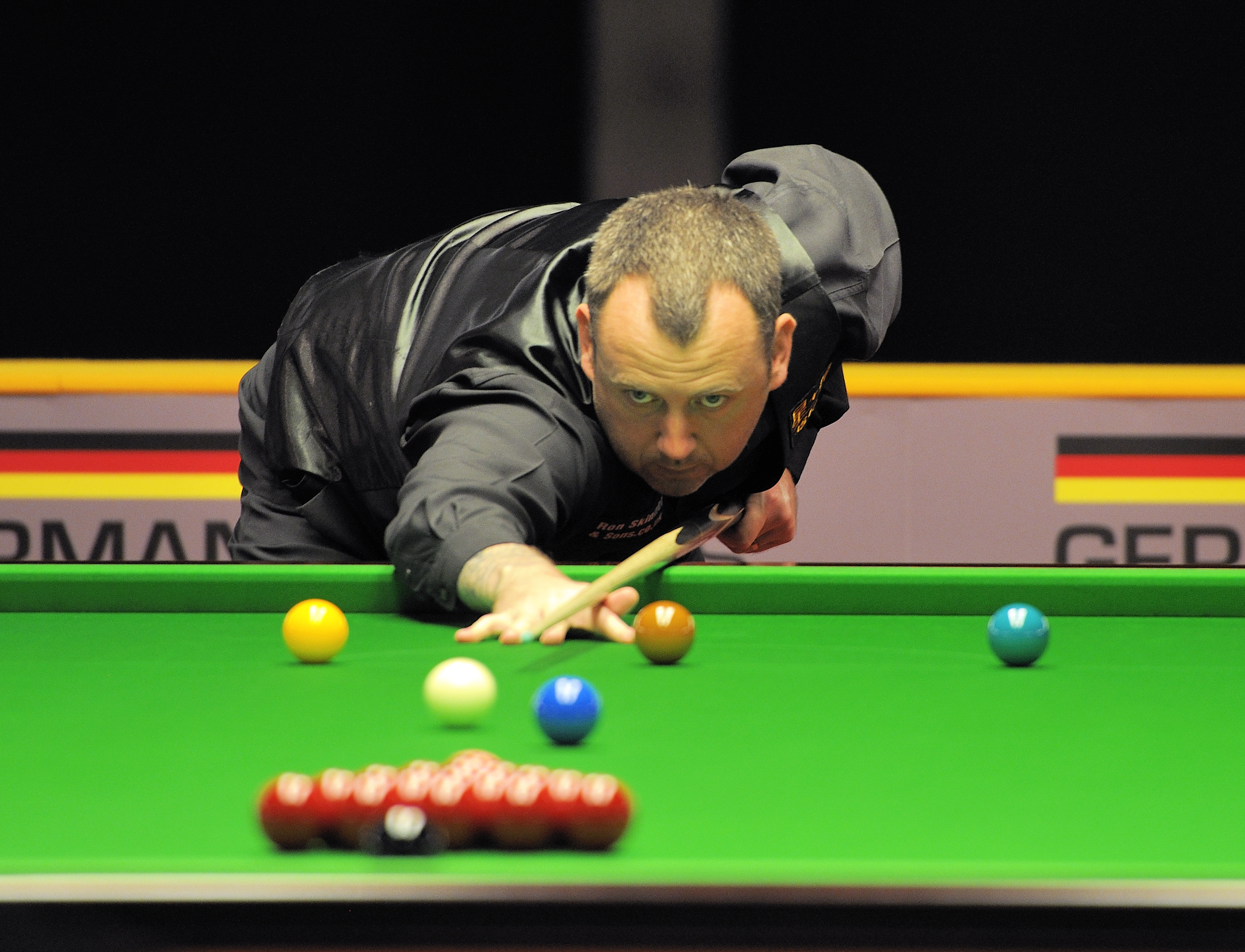
Mark Williams (pictured in 2014) made three century breaks as he defeated Jamie Clarke 6‍–‍4.

The second round was played on 29 and 30 November. In the afternoon session on 29 November, Trump whitewashed Jones 6‍–‍0, making a break of 100 in the first frame, the 950th century of his professional career. Ding made back-to-back centuries to lead Ford 2‍–‍0, but Ford responded with breaks of 118 and 96 to tie the scores at 2‍–‍2 at the mid-session interval. Ding took three of the last four frames, ending with a 106 century, to win 6‍–‍3.

In the evening session, Williams played Clarke in a rematch of their first-round meeting at the previous year's event. Clarke won the first two frames, making a 128 break in the second frame, but Williams won the next five frames to lead 5‍–‍2, including centuries of 138 and 107 in the third and seventh frames. Clarke won frames eight and nine, before Williams took the tenth frame with a break of 100 to win 6‍–‍4. Selby led Hawkins 3‍–‍1 at the mid-session interval, having made century breaks of 142 and 101 in the first and fourth frames. Although Hawkins took frame five with a 133 century, Selby went on to lead 5‍–‍3. Hawkins made breaks of 84 and 88 in the next two frames to tie the scores at 5‍–‍5. In the deciding frame, which lasted almost an hour, Hawkins snookered himself on the last blue ball, allowing Selby to clinch the match 6‍–‍5.

In the afternoon session on 30 November, O'Sullivan lost the first two frames against Milkins but won four frames in a row to lead 4‍–‍2, making a break of 142 in the fifth frame. Milkins tied the score at 5‍–‍5 with a 120 century, but O'Sullivan won the deciding frame for a 6‍–‍5 victory. Displeased with his form, O'Sullivan commented: "I had to dig my way out of it somehow... There was no flow, I was mis-timing shots, I was butchering balls." Zhou established a 4‍–‍1 lead over three-time champion Higgins, who won frames six and seven to reduce Zhou's lead to 4‍–‍3. Zhou won the eighth frame to lead 5‍–‍3. During the ninth, Higgins was distracted by lights in the TV studio and left the arena mid-match after complaining to referee Tatiana Woollaston. Play resumed after a delay, and Zhou captured the frame and match by 6‍–‍3.

In the evening session, Vafaei made three century breaks of 132, 133, and 121 to defeat Selt 6‍–‍1. Brecel and Zhang were tied at 2‍–‍2 and 4‍–‍4, but Zhang made breaks of 124 and 68 to clinch a 6‍–‍4 victory.

=== Quarter-finals ===
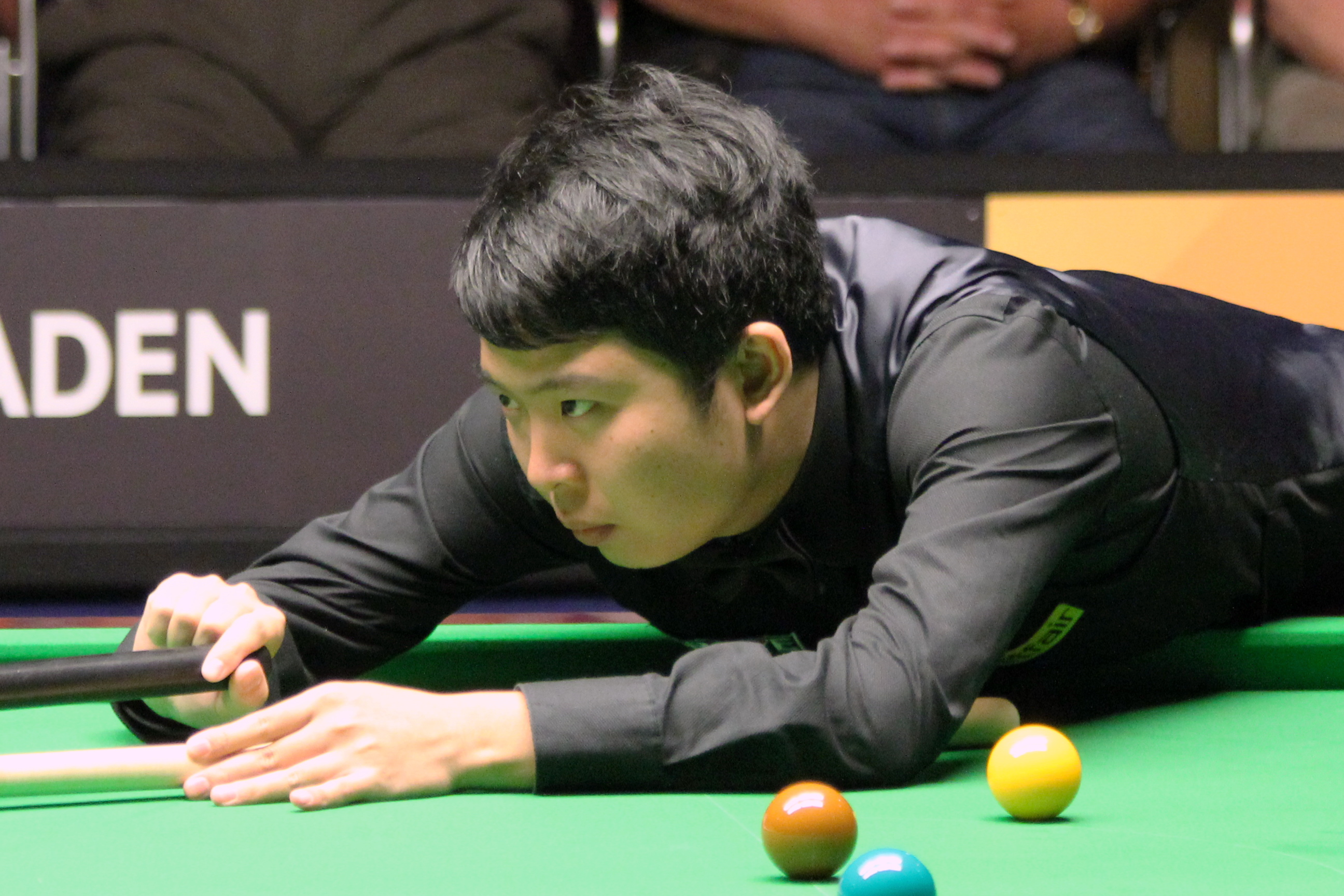
Zhang Anda (pictured in 2012) reached his first UK quarter-final but lost 4‍–‍6 to Hossein Vafaei.

The quarter-finals were played on 1 December. O'Sullivan made a break of 125 in the first frame against Zhou, and went on to lead 4‍–‍1. Zhou won four frames in a row for a 5‍–‍4 lead, but O'Sullivan took frame ten to force a decider, which he won with a 122 break. The victory made O'Sullivan the first player to win 100 matches in the history of the UK Championship.

Zhang made a 97 break in the first frame against Vafaei, but Vafaei made century breaks of 120 and 100 to tie the scores at 2‍–‍2. Vafaei took a 5‍–‍4 lead with a 106 break in the ninth frame, and won the match 6‍–‍4. Following the win, he said he didn't know what had given him the confidence to win, commenting: "I'm so happy that I'm still in the tournament."

Trump started his match against Selby with a break of 100, his 50th century break of the season, and won all four frames before the mid-session interval to lead 4‍–‍0. Selby won three of the next four frames, but Trump won the ninth to secure a 6‍–‍3 victory. The victory marked Trump's 1,000th career match win. Having already won three consecutive events during the season, he said: "It has already been a brilliant season, but until you prove yourself in these really big events then you can easily get forgotten about. You want to be delivering on the big stage as much as possible."

Ding lost the first two frames against Williams, but made breaks of 95 and 127 to level the scores at 2‍–‍2 at the mid-session interval. Frame eight set a new professional record for the most total points scored in a single frame. After both players accumulated numerous foul points in a protracted safety battle, Williams won the frame 101‍–‍94, for a total of 195 points. The previous record had been 192, set by Peter Lines and Dominic Dale during their qualifying match in the 2012 Wuxi Classic. Williams also won frame nine for a 5‍–‍4 lead, but Ding made breaks of 85 and 105 to clinch the match 6‍–‍5.

=== Semi-finals ===
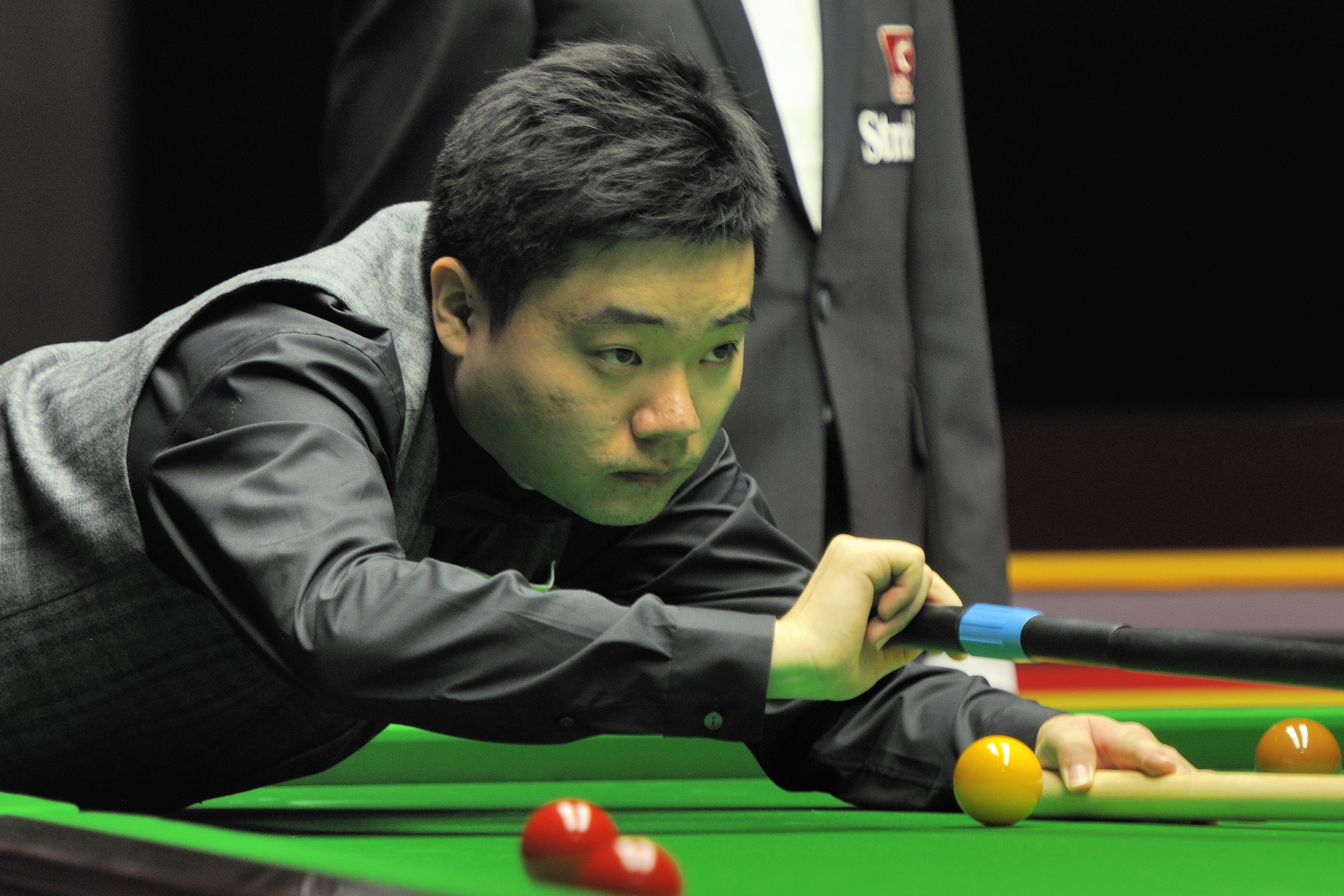
Ding Junhui (pictured in 2014) came through qualifying to reach his fifth UK final.

The semi-finals were played on 2 December. In the afternoon session, seven-time champion O'Sullivan played Vafaei, who was contesting his first Triple Crown semi-final. Breaks of 113 and 54 gave O'Sullivan the first two frames, but Vafaei made a 112 break in the third frame and also won the fourth to level at 2‍–‍2 going into the mid-session interval. O'Sullivan won the next four frames to take the match to 6‍–‍2, securing a place in his ninth UK Championship final. Vafaei said after his defeat: "In front of my hero I don't have that heart like I have with other people. I felt completely different. It was a good run and it was only one man that could stop me, Ronnie O'Sullivan."

In the evening session, three-time winner Ding faced the 2011 winner Trump. The scores were tied at 2‍–‍2 at the mid-session interval, after which Trump took the fifth frame with a break of 124, and Ding levelled the scores again at 3‍–‍3. Century breaks of 110 from Ding and 105 from Trump tied the scores for a third time at 4‍–‍4. Trump missed a pot on a red in frame nine, allowing Ding to clear with a break of 88. In frame ten, a safety mistake by Ding allowed Trump to pot a red to the middle pocket, but he was unable to capitalise on his advantage and lost the frame. Ding secured a 6‍–‍4 victory with an 84 break, reaching his fifth UK Championship final. He commented: "I have the feeling here [in York] that I can play well. It started in 2005 [UK Championship]. I'm happy to see myself get back into form like this. Normally I don't fight like this in a tough match."

=== Final ===
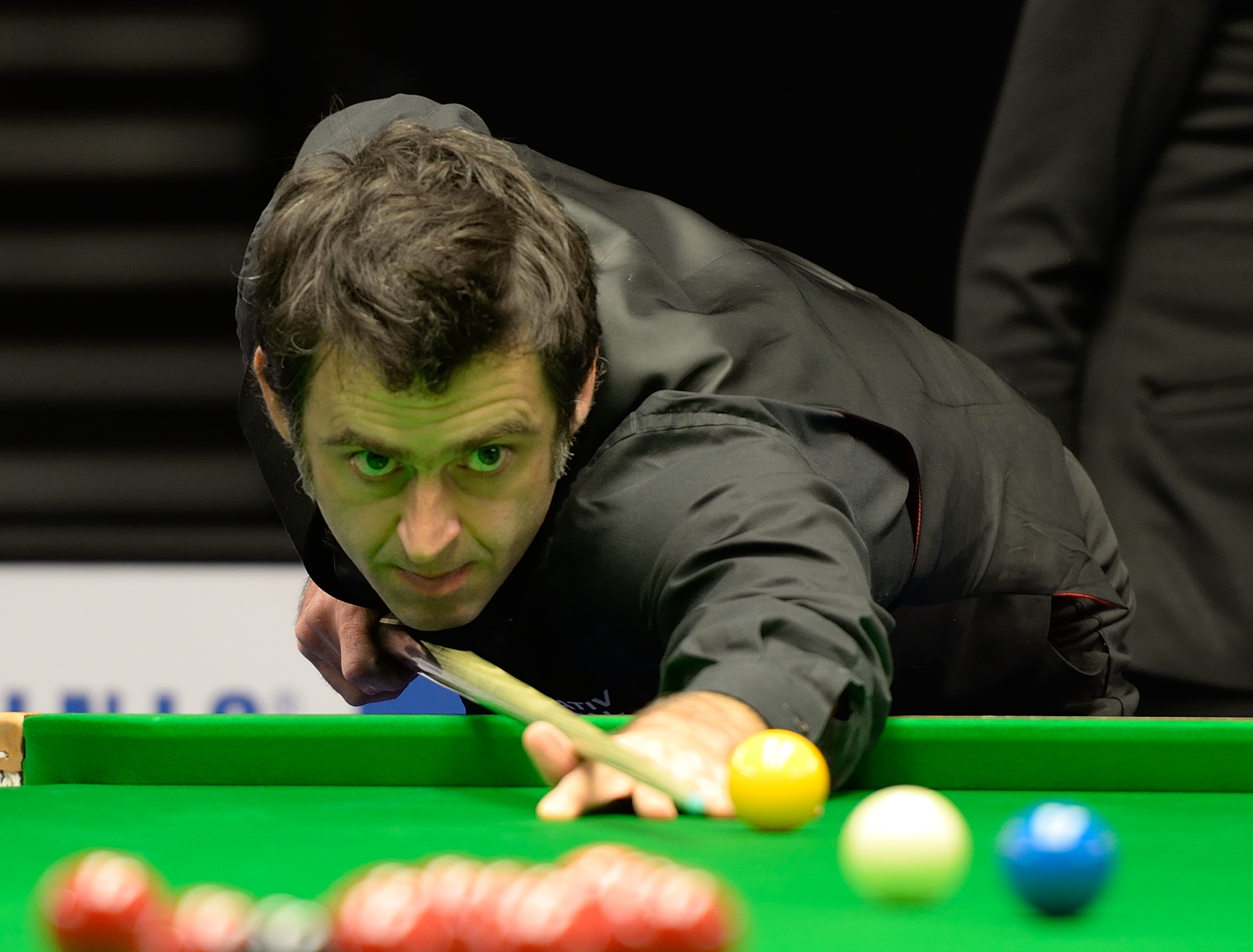
Ronnie O'Sullivan (pictured in 2015) won a record-extending eighth UK Championship title by defeating Ding Junhui 10‍–‍7. It was the 22nd Triple Crown title and 40th ranking title of his career.

Officiated by referee Rob Spencer, the final was played as the best of 19 frames over two sessions on 3 December between O'Sullivan and Ding. O'Sullivan was competing in his ninth UK Championship final, having previously won seven of eight finals; Ding was contesting his fifth UK final, having previously won three of four. O'Sullivan won the first three frames with breaks of 71, 71 and 91, before Ding made an 89 break to take the fourth frame. O'Sullivan won the next frame for a 4‍–‍1 lead, but Ding then won three frames in a row, making a break of 114 in the seventh, to end the afternoon session level at 4‍–‍4.

In the evening session, O'Sullivan made breaks of 84, 87 and 79, to move into a 7‍–‍5 lead, but Ding tied the scores again at 7‍–‍7, making a century break in frame 14. O'Sullivan then won three consecutive frames with breaks of 100, 74 and 129, to secure a 10‍–‍7 victory for a record-extending eighth UK title. It was O'Sullivan's 40th ranking win and 22nd Triple Crown title. Aged 47 years and 363 days, he became the oldest winner of the UK Championship, breaking the record set by Doug Mountjoy, who was 46 years and 172 days old when he won the 1988 event. He simultaneously remains the tournament's youngest winner, having first won the title 30 years previously at the 1993 UK Championship, aged 17 years and 358 days. O'Sullivan retained the world number one position after the event, while Ding re-entered the top 16 in the world rankings and qualified for the 2024 Masters. After the match, O'Sullivan said: "I always keep beating myself up because of the age thing. I keep thinking at some point you have to stop winning but I am doing all right and I will keep on going until the wheels fall off." Ding said: "I know it was going to be very tough against Ronnie. I like myself playing like this. It is very cool."

== Main draw ==
Top 16 players were seeded through to the main stage and drawn randomly against 16 qualifiers, shown below. Numbers in parentheses after the players' names denote their seedings, including the qualifying stage seedings for the qualifiers. Players in bold denote match winners. All matches were the best of 11 frames except the final, which was the best of 19 frames.

**Last 32**; Best of 11 frames
Mark Allen (NIR) (1)	5
**Ding Junhui (CHN) (17)**	**6**
**Tom Ford (ENG) (16)**	**6**
Noppon Saengkham (THA) (24)	5
**Mark Williams (WAL) (9)**	**6**
Fan Zhengyi (CHN) (33)	4
Kyren Wilson (ENG) (8)	5
**Jamie Clarke (WAL) (60)**	**6**
**Mark Selby (ENG) (5)**	**6**
Mark Joyce (ENG) (62)	0
**Barry Hawkins (ENG) (12)**	**6**
Ben Woollaston (ENG) (51)	4
Jack Lisowski (ENG) (13)	4
**Jamie Jones (WAL) (45)**	**6**
**Judd Trump (ENG) (4)**	**6**
Pang Junxu (CHN) (34)	1
**Ronnie O'Sullivan (ENG) (3)**	**6**
Anthony McGill (SCO) (21)	2
**Robert Milkins (ENG) (14)**	**6**
Thepchaiya Un-Nooh (THA) (40)	5
**John Higgins (SCO) (11)**	**6**
Joe O'Connor (ENG) (38)	3
Neil Robertson (AUS) (6)	2
**Zhou Yuelong (CHN) (26)**	**6**
Shaun Murphy (ENG) (7)	4
**Hossein Vafaei (IRN) (18)**	**6**
Ali Carter (ENG) (10)	3
**Matthew Selt (ENG) (29)**	**6**
**Zhang Anda (CHN) (15)**	**6**
Elliot Slessor (ENG) (55)	5
**Luca Brecel (BEL) (2)**	**6**
Yuan Sijun (CHN) (43)	4

**Last 16**; Best of 11 frames
**Ding Junhui (CHN) (17)**	**6**
Tom Ford (ENG) (16)	3
**Mark Williams (WAL) (9)**	**6**
Jamie Clarke (WAL) (60)	4
**Mark Selby (ENG) (5)**	**6**
Barry Hawkins (ENG) (12)	5
Jamie Jones (WAL) (45)	0
**Judd Trump (ENG) (4)**	**6**
**Ronnie O'Sullivan (ENG) (3)**	**6**
Robert Milkins (ENG) (14)	5
John Higgins (SCO) (11)	3
**Zhou Yuelong (CHN) (26)**	**6**
**Hossein Vafaei (IRN) (18)**	**6**
Matthew Selt (ENG) (29)	1
**Zhang Anda (CHN) (15)**	**6**
Luca Brecel (BEL) (2)	4

**Quarter-finals**; Best of 11 frames
**Ding Junhui (CHN) (17)**	**6**
Mark Williams (WAL) (9)	5
Mark Selby (ENG) (5)	3
**Judd Trump (ENG) (4)**	**6**
**Ronnie O'Sullivan (ENG) (3)**	**6**
Zhou Yuelong (CHN) (26)	5
**Hossein Vafaei (IRN) (18)**	**6**
Zhang Anda (CHN) (15)	4

**Semi-finals**; Best of 11 frames
**Ding Junhui (CHN) (17)**	**6**
Judd Trump (ENG) (4)	4
**Ronnie O'Sullivan (ENG) (3)**	**6**
Hossein Vafaei (IRN) (18)	2

**Final**; Best of 19 frames
Ding Junhui (CHN) (17)	7
**Ronnie O'Sullivan (ENG) (3)**	**10**

=== Final ===
Final: Best of 19 frames. Referee: Rob Spencer; York Barbican, York, England, 3 December 2023
Ding Junhui (17); China	7–**10**	**Ronnie O'Sullivan** (3); England
Afternoon: 0–**96**, 63–**71**, 38–**91**, **99**–31, 49–**60**, **71**–19, **115**–0 (114), **76**–0; Evening: 0–**89**, **56**–2, 6–**127**, 6–**80**, **70**–4, **104**–4 (104), 0–**100** (100), 8–**87**, 6–**134** (129)
(frame 7) 114	Highest break	**129** (frame 17)
2	Century breaks	2

== Qualifying draw ==
The draw for the qualifying stage of the tournament is shown below. Numbers in parentheses after the players' names denote the 112 seeded players, and players in bold denote match winners; an "a" indicates amateur players not on the main tour (i.e. without a world ranking), while a "u" denotes the player was unseeded. All matches were the best of 11 frames.

**Round 1 (Last 144)**; Best of 11 frames 18–19 November
**Daniel Wells (WAL) (81)**	**6**
Mostafa Dorgham (EGY) (u)	2
**Jenson Kendrick (ENG) (112)**	**6**
Oliver Briffett-Payne (WAL) (a)	4
Adam Duffy (ENG) (96)	3
**Mink Nutcharut (THA) (u)**	**6**
**Stuart Carrington (ENG) (97)**	**6**
Manasawin Phetmalaikul (THA) (u)	2
**Mohamed Ibrahim (EGY) (104)**	**6**
Victor Sarkis (BRA) (u)	3
**Marco Fu (HKG) (89)**	**6**
Michael Holt (ENG) (a)	5
Anton Kazakov (UKR) (105)	1
**Ryan Davies (ENG) (a)**	**6**
**Xing Zihao (CHN) (88)**	**6**
Jimmy White (ENG) (u)	2
**Ross Muir (SCO) (85)**	**6**
Andrew Pagett (WAL) (u)	1
**Stan Moody (ENG) (108)**	**6**
Filips Kalniņš (LAT) (a)	3
**Peng Yisong (CHN) (92)**	**6**
Umut Dikme (GER) (a)	0
Alfie Burden (ENG) (101)	1
**Oliver Sykes (ENG) (a)**	**6**
**Ma Hailong (CHN) (100)**	**6**
Sydney Wilson (ENG) (a)	4
Fergal O'Brien (IRL) (93)	2
**Robbie McGuigan (NIR) (a)**	**6**
**Jiang Jun (CHN) (109)**	**6**
Rebecca Kenna (ENG) (u)	0
**Allan Taylor (ENG) (84)**	**6**
Liam Davies (WAL) (a)	5
**Rod Lawler (ENG) (83)**	**6**
Liam Graham (SCO) (u)	2
**Ryan Thomerson (AUS) (110)**	**6**
Reanne Evans (ENG) (u)	5
**Andy Lee (HKG) (94)**	**6**
Joel Connolly (NIR) (a)	2
Liam Pullen (ENG) (99)	1
**Iulian Boiko (UKR) (a)**	**6**
**Long Zehuang (CHN) (102)**	**6**
Haydon Pinhey (ENG) (a)	5
Oliver Brown (ENG) (91)	1
**Dean Young (SCO) (u)**	**6**
Andrew Higginson (ENG) (106)	4
**Alexander Ursenbacher (SUI) (u)**	**6**
Muhammad Asif (PAK) (86)	1
**Duane Jones (WAL) (a)**	**6**
**Sean O'Sullivan (ENG) (87)**	**6**
Baipat Siripaporn (THA) (u)	5
**Louis Heathcote (ENG) (107)**	**6**
Ahmed Aly Elsayed (USA) (u)	0
**Hammad Miah (ENG) (90)**	**6**
Bulcsú Révész (HUN) (a)	3
**Ian Burns (ENG) (103)**	**6**
Amaan Iqbal (SCO) (a)	0
Ishpreet Singh Chadha (IND) (98)	3
**Gao Yang (CHN) (a)**	**6**
Andres Petrov (EST) (95)	3
**Craig Steadman (ENG) (a)**	**6**
**Rory Thor (MAS) (111)**	**6**
Riley Powell (WAL) (a)	0
**Martin O'Donnell (ENG) (82)**	**6**
Jack Borwick (SCO) (a)	4

**Round 2 (Last 112)**; Best of 11 frames 19–20 November
Ashley Carty (ENG) (80)	2
**Daniel Wells (WAL) (81)**	**6**
**Robbie Williams (ENG) (49)**	**6**
Jenson Kendrick (ENG) (112)	1
**Michael White (WAL) (65)**	**6**
Mink Nutcharut (THA) (u)	5
**Martin Gould (ENG) (64)**	**6**
Stuart Carrington (ENG) (97)	0
**Andy Hicks (ENG) (57)**	**6**
Mohamed Ibrahim (EGY) (104)	4
Ben Mertens (BEL) (72)	4
**Marco Fu (HKG) (89)**	**6**
**David Grace (ENG) (56)**	**6**
Ryan Davies (ENG) (a)	5
**James Cahill (ENG) (73)**	**6**
Xing Zihao (CHN) (88)	2
**He Guoqiang (CHN) (76)**	**6**
Ross Muir (SCO) (85)	4
**Dominic Dale (WAL) (53)**	**6**
Stan Moody (ENG) (108)	5
**Julien Leclercq (BEL) (69)**	**6**
Peng Yisong (CHN) (92)	5
**Jamie Clarke (WAL) (60)**	**6**
Oliver Sykes (ENG) (a)	4
**Xu Si (CHN) (61)**	**6**
Ma Hailong (CHN) (100)	1
**Dylan Emery (WAL) (68)**	**6**
Robbie McGuigan (NIR) (a)	2
Jackson Page (WAL) (52)	4
**Jiang Jun (CHN) (109)**	**6**
**Zak Surety (ENG) (77)**	**6**
Allan Taylor (ENG) (84)	3
**Lukas Kleckers (GER) (78)**	**6**
Rod Lawler (ENG) (83)	3
**Ben Woollaston (ENG) (51)**	**6**
Ryan Thomerson (AUS) (110)	1
Sanderson Lam (ENG) (67)	5
**Andy Lee (HKG) (94)**	**6**
**Mark Joyce (ENG) (62)**	**6**
Iulian Boiko (UKR) (a)	5
**Oliver Lines (ENG) (59)**	**6**
Long Zehuang (CHN) (102)	3
**Ashley Hugill (ENG) (70)**	**6**
Dean Young (SCO) (u)	3
Tian Pengfei (CHN) (54)	3
**Alexander Ursenbacher (SUI) (u)**	**6**
**Ken Doherty (IRL) (75)**	**6**
Duane Jones (WAL) (a)	3
**David Lilley (ENG) (74)**	**6**
Sean O'Sullivan (ENG) (87)	3
**Elliot Slessor (ENG) (55)**	**6**
Louis Heathcote (ENG) (107)	1
John Astley (ENG) (71)	1
**Hammad Miah (ENG) (90)**	**6**
Liam Highfield (ENG) (58)	0
**Ian Burns (ENG) (103)**	**6**
**Mark Davis (ENG) (63)**	**6**
Gao Yang (CHN) (a)	4
Aaron Hill (IRL) (66)	2
**Craig Steadman (ENG) (a)**	**6**
**Scott Donaldson (SCO) (50)**	**6**
Rory Thor (MAS) (111)	2
Liu Hongyu (CHN) (79)	5
**Martin O'Donnell (ENG) (82)**	**6**

**Round 3 (Last 80)**; Best of 11 frames 20–21 November
**Ding Junhui (CHN) (17)**	**6**
Daniel Wells (WAL) (81)	4
Matthew Stevens (WAL) (48)	5
**Robbie Williams (ENG) (49)**	**6**
Si Jiahui (CHN) (32)	5
**Michael White (WAL) (65)**	**6**
**Fan Zhengyi (CHN) (33)**	**6**
Martin Gould (ENG) (64)	3
**Thepchaiya Un-Nooh (THA) (40)**	**6**
Andy Hicks (ENG) (57)	2
**Ricky Walden (ENG) (25)**	**6**
Marco Fu (HKG) (89)	5
**Wu Yize (CHN) (41)**	**6**
David Grace (ENG) (56)	2
**Noppon Saengkham (THA) (24)**	**6**
James Cahill (ENG) (73)	5
**Anthony McGill (SCO) (21)**	**6**
He Guoqiang (CHN) (76)	3
**Anthony Hamilton (ENG) (44)**	**6**
Dominic Dale (WAL) (53)	3
**David Gilbert (ENG) (28)**	**6**
Julien Leclercq (BEL) (69)	1
Jordan Brown (NIR) (37)	4
**Jamie Clarke (WAL) (60)**	**6**
**Lyu Haotian (CHN) (36)**	**6**
Xu Si (CHN) (61)	2
**Matthew Selt (ENG) (29)**	**6**
Dylan Emery (WAL) (68)	4
**Jamie Jones (WAL) (45)**	**6**
Jiang Jun (CHN) (109)	4
Gary Wilson (ENG) (20)	3
**Zak Surety (ENG) (77)**	**6**
Ryan Day (WAL) (19)	2
**Lukas Kleckers (GER) (78)**	**6**
Cao Yupeng (CHN) (46)	4
**Ben Woollaston (ENG) (51)**	**6**
**Joe Perry (ENG) (30)**	**6**
Andy Lee (HKG) (94)	2
Xiao Guodong (CHN) (35)	2
**Mark Joyce (ENG) (62)**	**6**
**Joe O'Connor (ENG) (38)**	**6**
Oliver Lines (ENG) (59)	5
**Stephen Maguire (SCO) (27)**	**6**
Ashley Hugill (ENG) (70)	4
**Yuan Sijun (CHN) (43)**	**6**
Alexander Ursenbacher (SUI) (u)	5
Chris Wakelin (ENG) (22)	4
**Ken Doherty (IRL) (75)**	**6**
Stuart Bingham (ENG) (23)	2
**David Lilley (ENG) (74)**	**6**
Graeme Dott (SCO) (42)	3
**Elliot Slessor (ENG) (55)**	**6**
**Zhou Yuelong (CHN) (26)**	**6**
Hammad Miah (ENG) (90)	4
Jak Jones (WAL) (39)	2
**Ian Burns (ENG) (103)**	**6**
**Pang Junxu (CHN) (34)**	**6**
Mark Davis (ENG) (63)	4
Jimmy Robertson (ENG) (31)	5
**Craig Steadman (ENG) (a)**	**6**
Sam Craigie (ENG) (47)	1
**Scott Donaldson (SCO) (50)**	**6**
**Hossein Vafaei (IRN) (18)**	**6**
Martin O'Donnell (ENG) (82)	0

**Round 4 (Last 48)**; Best of 11 frames 22–23 November
**Ding Junhui (CHN) (17)**	**6**
Robbie Williams (ENG) (49)	3
Michael White (WAL) (65)	5
**Fan Zhengyi (CHN) (33)**	**6**
**Thepchaiya Un-Nooh (THA) (40)**	**6**
Ricky Walden (ENG) (25)	3
Wu Yize (CHN) (41)	4
**Noppon Saengkham (THA) (24)**	**6**
**Anthony McGill (SCO) (21)**	**6**
Anthony Hamilton (ENG) (44)	2
David Gilbert (ENG) (28)	5
**Jamie Clarke (WAL) (60)**	**6**
Lyu Haotian (CHN) (36)	3
**Matthew Selt (ENG) (29)**	**6**
**Jamie Jones (WAL) (45)**	**6**
Zak Surety (ENG) (77)	4
Lukas Kleckers (GER) (78)	1
**Ben Woollaston (ENG) (51)**	**6**
Joe Perry (ENG) (30)	4
**Mark Joyce (ENG) (62)**	**6**
**Joe O'Connor (ENG) (38)**	**6**
Stephen Maguire (SCO) (27)	3
**Yuan Sijun (CHN) (43)**	**6**
Ken Doherty (IRL) (75)	3
David Lilley (ENG) (74)	3
**Elliot Slessor (ENG) (55)**	**6**
**Zhou Yuelong (CHN) (26)**	**6**
Ian Burns (ENG) (103)	5
**Pang Junxu (CHN) (34)**	**6**
Craig Steadman (ENG) (a)	2
Scott Donaldson (SCO) (50)	4
**Hossein Vafaei (IRN) (18)**	**6**

== Century breaks ==
=== Main stage centuries ===
A total of 63 century breaks were made in the main stage of the tournament.

- 142, 129, 125, 122, 113, 100 – Ronnie O'Sullivan
- 142, 101 – Mark Selby
- 138, 107, 100, 100 – Mark Williams
- 136, 134 – Zhou Yuelong
- 135, 127, 126, 114, 110, 110, 106, 105, 104, 102 – Ding Junhui
- 135 – Neil Robertson
- 133, 132, 121, 120, 112, 106, 100, 100 – Hossein Vafaei
- 133 – Barry Hawkins
- 130, 118 – Tom Ford
- 130 – Fan Zhengyi
- 128, 104 – Jamie Clarke
- 127, 126, 100 – Noppon Saengkham
- 127, 108 – Luca Brecel
- 127 – Thepchaiya Un-Nooh
- 124, 124, 114, 105, 100, 100 – Judd Trump
- 124 – Zhang Anda
- 122 – John Higgins
- 121, 120, 112 – Robert Milkins
- 116 – Anthony McGill
- 113, 101 – Jamie Jones
- 111, 102 – Matthew Selt
- 106 – Mark Allen
- 100 – Ben Woollaston

=== Qualifying stage centuries ===
A total of 80 century breaks were made during the qualifying stage of the tournament.

- 147 – Xu Si
- 140, 124, 119, 115 – Stephen Maguire
- 140 – Bulcsú Révész
- 139, 109 – Jiang Jun
- 138, 138, 128, 108 – Long Zehuang
- 138 – Muhammad Asif
- 136, 122, 113 – Ding Junhui
- 136 – Ben Woollaston
- 136 – Wu Yize
- 135, 135, 121, 102, 101 – Yuan Sijun
- 135, 117, 102 – Thepchaiya Un-Nooh
- 135 – Zak Surety
- 133, 120, 109, 108 – Hossein Vafaei
- 131 – Andy Hicks
- 130, 108 – Ricky Walden
- 128, 123 – Martin Gould
- 128 – Ben Mertens
- 127 – Matthew Selt
- 125, 117 – Michael Holt
- 123, 114, 103 – Stan Moody
- 122 – Dylan Emery
- 122 – Tian Pengfei
- 122 – Dean Young
- 121 – Ryan Davies
- 118, 110 – Ian Burns
- 118, 104 – Elliot Slessor
- 118, 101 – Joe O'Connor
- 117 – Julien Leclercq
- 116, 104 – Marco Fu
- 116 – Cao Yupeng
- 113 – Jackson Page
- 113 – Xiao Guodong
- 112, 100 – Alexander Ursenbacher
- 111, 111 – Zhou Yuelong
- 111 – Iulian Boiko
- 108 – Dominic Dale
- 108 – Ryan Thomerson
- 106, 100 – Scott Donaldson
- 106 – Martin O'Donnell
- 105 – Lukas Kleckers
- 104 – Lyu Haotian
- 104 – Xing Zihao
- 103 – Robbie McGuigan
- 103 – Ross Muir
- 102 – Fan Zhengyi
- 102 – Louis Heathcote
- 102 – Joe Perry
- 101 – Manasawin Phetmalaikul
- 101 – Daniel Wells
- 100 – Ken Doherty
