= 2022 Championship League (invitational) =

Professional snooker tournament

2022 BetVictor Championship League Invitational
Tournament information
- Dates: 20 December 2021 – 4 February 2022
- Venue: Morningside Arena
- City: Leicester
- Country: England
- Organisation: Matchroom Sport
- Format: Non-ranking event
- Total prize fund: £184,400
- Winner's share: £10,000 (plus bonuses)
- Highest break: Zhao Xintong (CHN) (143)

Final
- Champion: John Higgins (SCO)
- Runner-up: Stuart Bingham (ENG)
- Score: 3–2

The 2022 Championship League Invitational (officially the 2022 BetVictor Championship League Snooker Invitational) was a professional non-ranking snooker tournament that took place from 20 December 2021 to 4 February 2022 at the Morningside Arena in Leicester, England. It was the 18th staging of the Championship League.

Kyren Wilson was the defending champion, having beaten Mark Williams 3–2 in the final of the previous invitational edition of the tournament. His defence of the title ended in the Group 7 semi-finals, where he was beaten 3–1 by John Higgins.

John Higgins went on to win the tournament for the third time, beating Stuart Bingham 3–2 in the final.

== Prize fund ==
The breakdown of prize money for the 2022 Championship League is shown below.

Groups 1–7

- Winner: £3,000
- Runner-up: £2,000
- Semi-final: £1,000
- Frame-win (league stage): £100
- Frame-win (play-offs): £300
- Highest break: £500

Winners' Group

- Winner: £10,000
- Runner-up: £5,000
- Semi-final: £3,000
- Frame-win (league stage): £200
- Frame-win (play-offs): £300
- Highest break: £1,000

- Tournament total: £184,400

== Group 1 ==
Group 1 was played on 20 and 21 December 2021. Liang Wenbo won the group and qualified for the Winners' Group.

=== Matches ===
- Jack Lisowski 3–1 Zhou Yuelong
- Graeme Dott 3–1 Tom Ford
- Jack Lisowski 0–3 Gary Wilson
- Ryan Day 1–3 Liang Wenbo
- Zhou Yuelong 1–3 Graeme Dott
- Gary Wilson 2–3 Liang Wenbo
- Jack Lisowski 1–3 Graeme Dott
- Tom Ford 2–3 Ryan Day
- Graeme Dott 3–1 Gary Wilson
- Zhou Yuelong 3–1 Tom Ford
- Gary Wilson 2–3 Ryan Day
- Jack Lisowski 3–2 Liang Wenbo
- Tom Ford 1–3 Liang Wenbo
- Zhou Yuelong 1–3 Ryan Day
- Tom Ford 3–1 Gary Wilson
- Graeme Dott 3–2 Ryan Day
- Zhou Yuelong 2–3 Gary Wilson
- Graeme Dott 3–2 Liang Wenbo
- Jack Lisowski 3–1 Ryan Day
- Zhou Yuelong 3–2 Liang Wenbo
- Jack Lisowski 1–3 Tom Ford

=== Table ===
Pos	Player	Pld	W	L	FF	FA	FD	
1	Graeme Dott (SCO)	6	6	0	18	8	+10	Qualification to Group 1 play-off
2	Liang Wenbo (CHN)	6	3	3	15	13	+2	Qualification to Group 1 play-off
3	Ryan Day (WAL)	6	3	3	13	14	−1	Qualification to Group 1 play-off
4	Jack Lisowski (ENG)	6	3	3	11	13	−2	Qualification to Group 1 play-off
5	Gary Wilson (ENG)	6	2	4	12	14	−2	Advances into Group 2
6	Tom Ford (ENG)	6	2	4	11	14	−3	Eliminated from the competition
7	Zhou Yuelong (CHN)	6	2	4	11	15	−4	Eliminated from the competition

Source: 2022 Championship League Snooker Group 1

=== Play-offs ===
Semi-finals; Best of 5 frames
Graeme Dott (SCO)	1
Jack Lisowski (ENG)	3
Liang Wenbo (CHN)	3
Ryan Day (WAL)	2

Final; Best of 5 frames
Jack Lisowski (ENG)	1
Liang Wenbo (CHN)	3

== Group 2 ==
Group 2 was played on 22 and 23 December 2021. Graeme Dott won the group and qualified for the Winners' Group.

=== Matches ===
- Xiao Guodong 1–3 Lu Ning
- Joe Perry 3–2 Gary Wilson
- Xiao Guodong 3–2 Graeme Dott
- Ryan Day 2–3 Jack Lisowski
- Lu Ning 3–0 Joe Perry
- Graeme Dott 3–2 Jack Lisowski
- Xiao Guodong 2–3 Joe Perry
- Gary Wilson 0–3 Ryan Day
- Joe Perry 3–1 Graeme Dott
- Lu Ning 2–3 Gary Wilson
- Graeme Dott 2–3 Ryan Day
- Xiao Guodong 3–2 Jack Lisowski
- Gary Wilson 1–3 Jack Lisowski
- Lu Ning 3–2 Ryan Day
- Gary Wilson 0–3 Graeme Dott
- Joe Perry 0–3 Ryan Day
- Lu Ning 1–3 Graeme Dott
- Joe Perry 3–2 Jack Lisowski
- Xiao Guodong 1–3 Ryan Day
- Lu Ning 3–1 Jack Lisowski
- Xiao Guodong 3–2 Gary Wilson

=== Table ===
Pos	Player	Pld	W	L	FF	FA	FD	
1	Ryan Day (WAL)	6	4	2	16	9	+7	Qualification to Group 2 play-off
2	Lu Ning (CHN)	6	4	2	15	10	+5	Qualification to Group 2 play-off
3	Joe Perry (ENG)	6	4	2	12	13	−1	Qualification to Group 2 play-off
4	Graeme Dott (SCO)	6	3	3	14	12	+2	Qualification to Group 2 play-off
5	Xiao Guodong (CHN)	6	3	3	13	15	−2	Advances into Group 3
6	Jack Lisowski (ENG)	6	2	4	13	15	−2	Eliminated from the competition
7	Gary Wilson (ENG)	6	1	5	8	17	−9	Eliminated from the competition

Source: 2022 Championship League Snooker Group 2

=== Play-offs ===
Semi-finals; Best of 5 frames
Ryan Day (WAL)	2
Graeme Dott (SCO)	3
Lu Ning (CHN)	3
Joe Perry (ENG)	2

Final; Best of 5 frames
Graeme Dott (SCO)	3
Lu Ning (CHN)	1

== Group 3 ==
Group 3 was played on 3 and 4 January 2022. Mark Williams was due to take part in this group, but withdrew and was replaced by Zhao Xintong. Zhao won the group and qualified for the Winners' Group.

=== Matches ===
- Mark Selby 0–3 Zhao Xintong
- Stuart Bingham 2–3 Xiao Guodong
- Mark Selby 2–3 Ryan Day
- Joe Perry 2–3 Lu Ning
- Zhao Xintong 3–1 Stuart Bingham
- Ryan Day 0–3 Lu Ning
- Mark Selby 3–2 Stuart Bingham
- Xiao Guodong 3–2 Joe Perry
- Stuart Bingham 3–0 Ryan Day
- Zhao Xintong 3–2 Xiao Guodong
- Ryan Day 2–3 Joe Perry
- Mark Selby 3–1 Lu Ning
- Xiao Guodong 3–2 Lu Ning
- Zhao Xintong 3–0 Joe Perry
- Xiao Guodong 3–1 Ryan Day
- Stuart Bingham 3–2 Joe Perry
- Zhao Xintong 3–0 Ryan Day
- Stuart Bingham 3–2 Lu Ning
- Mark Selby 3–0 Joe Perry
- Zhao Xintong 3–1 Lu Ning
- Mark Selby 3–0 Xiao Guodong

=== Table ===
Pos	Player	Pld	W	L	FF	FA	FD	
1	Zhao Xintong (CHN)	6	6	0	18	4	+14	Qualification to Group 3 play-off
2	Mark Selby (ENG)	6	4	2	14	9	+5	Qualification to Group 3 play-off
3	Xiao Guodong (CHN)	6	4	2	14	13	+1	Qualification to Group 3 play-off
4	Stuart Bingham (ENG)	6	3	3	14	13	+1	Qualification to Group 3 play-off
5	Lu Ning (CHN)	6	2	4	12	14	−2	Advances into Group 4
6	Joe Perry (ENG)	6	1	5	9	17	−8	Eliminated from the competition
7	Ryan Day (WAL)	6	1	5	6	17	−11	Eliminated from the competition

Source: 2022 Championship League Snooker Group 3

=== Play-offs ===
Semi-finals; Best of 5 frames
Zhao Xintong (CHN)	3
Stuart Bingham (ENG)	1
Mark Selby (ENG)	1
Xiao Guodong (CHN)	3

Final; Best of 5 frames
Zhao Xintong (CHN)	3
Xiao Guodong (CHN)	2

== Group 4 ==
Group 4 was played on 5 and 6 January 2022. Barry Hawkins was due to take part in this group, but withdrew and was replaced by Scott Donaldson. Stuart Bingham won the group and qualified for the Winners' Group.

=== Matches ===
- Judd Trump 0–3 Scott Donaldson
- Kyren Wilson 3–1 Lu Ning
- Judd Trump 2–3 Stuart Bingham
- Mark Selby 3–2 Xiao Guodong
- Kyren Wilson 3–2 Scott Donaldson
- Stuart Bingham 3–1 Xiao Guodong
- Judd Trump 2–3 Kyren Wilson
- Mark Selby 3–2 Lu Ning
- Kyren Wilson 3–1 Stuart Bingham
- Lu Ning 2–3 Scott Donaldson
- Mark Selby 3–1 Stuart Bingham
- Judd Trump 3–1 Xiao Guodong
- Xiao Guodong 2–3 Lu Ning
- Mark Selby 3–0 Scott Donaldson
- Stuart Bingham 2–3 Lu Ning
- Mark Selby 2–3 Kyren Wilson
- Stuart Bingham 3–0 Scott Donaldson
- Kyren Wilson 3–0 Xiao Guodong
- Mark Selby 3–0 Judd Trump
- Xiao Guodong 1–3 Scott Donaldson
- Judd Trump 3–0 Lu Ning

=== Table ===
Pos	Player	Pld	W	L	FF	FA	FD	
1	Kyren Wilson (ENG)	6	6	0	18	8	+10	Qualification to Group 4 play-off
2	Mark Selby (ENG)	6	5	1	17	8	+9	Qualification to Group 4 play-off
3	Stuart Bingham (ENG)	6	3	3	13	12	+1	Qualification to Group 4 play-off
4	Scott Donaldson (SCO)	6	3	3	11	12	−1	Qualification to Group 4 play-off
5	Lu Ning (CHN)	6	2	4	11	16	−5	Advances into Group 5
6	Judd Trump (ENG)	6	2	4	10	13	−3	Eliminated from the competition
7	Xiao Guodong (CHN)	6	0	6	7	18	−11	Eliminated from the competition

Source: 2022 Championship League Snooker Group 4

=== Play-offs ===
Semi-finals; Best of 5 frames
Kyren Wilson (ENG)	3
Scott Donaldson (SCO)	0
Mark Selby (ENG)	2
Stuart Bingham (ENG)	3

Final; Best of 5 frames
Kyren Wilson (ENG)	2
Stuart Bingham (ENG)	3

== Group 5 ==
Group 5 was played on 7 and 8 January 2022. Mark Selby was due to take part in this group, but withdrew and was replaced by Jordan Brown. Scott Donaldson won the group and qualified for the Winners' Group.

=== Matches ===
- Martin Gould 0–3 Scott Donaldson
- David Gilbert 3–1 Lu Ning
- Martin Gould 3–2 Ali Carter
- Kyren Wilson 0–3 Scott Donaldson
- David Gilbert 2–3 Ali Carter
- Kyren Wilson 3–1 Jordan Brown
- Martin Gould 3–1 David Gilbert
- Jordan Brown 3–2 Lu Ning
- David Gilbert 1–3 Scott Donaldson
- Ali Carter 3–1 Lu Ning
- Jordan Brown 3–2 Scott Donaldson
- Kyren Wilson 3–1 Martin Gould
- Kyren Wilson 3–0 Lu Ning
- Ali Carter 0–3 Jordan Brown
- Lu Ning 3–2 Scott Donaldson
- David Gilbert 2–3 Jordan Brown
- Ali Carter 0–3 Scott Donaldson
- Kyren Wilson 2–3 David Gilbert
- Martin Gould 0–3 Jordan Brown
- Kyren Wilson 1–3 Ali Carter
- Martin Gould 3–1 Lu Ning

=== Table ===
Pos	Player	Pld	W	L	FF	FA	FD	
1	Jordan Brown (NIR)	6	5	1	16	9	+7	Qualification to Group 5 play-off
2	Scott Donaldson (SCO)	6	4	2	16	7	+9	Qualification to Group 5 play-off
3	Kyren Wilson (ENG)	6	3	3	12	11	+1	Qualification to Group 5 play-off
4	Ali Carter (ENG)	6	3	3	11	13	−2	Qualification to Group 5 play-off
5	Martin Gould (ENG)	6	3	3	10	13	−3	Advances into Group 6
6	David Gilbert (ENG)	6	2	4	12	15	−3	Eliminated from the competition
7	Lu Ning (CHN)	6	1	5	8	17	−9	Eliminated from the competition

Source: 2022 Championship League Snooker Group 5

=== Play-offs ===
Semi-finals; Best of 5 frames
Jordan Brown (NIR)	3
Ali Carter (ENG)	0
Scott Donaldson (SCO)	3
Kyren Wilson (ENG)	2

Final; Best of 5 frames
Jordan Brown (NIR)	2
Scott Donaldson (SCO)	3

== Group 6 ==
Group 6 was played on 17 and 18 January 2022. Ricky Walden was due to take part in this group, but withdrew and was replaced by Matthew Selt. Yan Bingtao won the group and qualified for the Winners' Group.

=== Matches ===
- Yan Bingtao 3–1 Ali Carter
- Martin Gould 3–2 Matthew Selt
- Yan Bingtao 3–1 Ding Junhui
- Kyren Wilson 2–3 Jordan Brown
- Matthew Selt 2–3 Ding Junhui
- Ali Carter 3–0 Jordan Brown
- Yan Bingtao 2–3 Matthew Selt
- Martin Gould 3–2 Kyren Wilson
- Ali Carter 3–0 Matthew Selt
- Ding Junhui 3–2 Martin Gould
- Ali Carter 1–3 Kyren Wilson
- Yan Bingtao 3–0 Jordan Brown
- Martin Gould 3–2 Jordan Brown
- Ding Junhui 0–3 Kyren Wilson
- Martin Gould 3–1 Ali Carter
- Kyren Wilson 3–0 Matthew Selt
- Ding Junhui 3–1 Ali Carter
- Matthew Selt 1–3 Jordan Brown
- Yan Bingtao 3–0 Kyren Wilson
- Ding Junhui 3–2 Jordan Brown
- Yan Bingtao 3–0 Martin Gould

=== Table ===
Pos	Player	Pld	W	L	FF	FA	FD	
1	Yan Bingtao (CHN)	6	5	1	17	5	+12	Qualification to Group 6 play-off
2	Martin Gould (ENG)	6	4	2	14	13	+1	Qualification to Group 6 play-off
3	Ding Junhui (CHN)	6	4	2	13	13	0	Qualification to Group 6 play-off
4	Kyren Wilson (ENG)	6	3	3	13	10	+3	Qualification to Group 6 play-off
5	Ali Carter (ENG)	6	2	4	10	12	−2	Advances into Group 7
6	Jordan Brown (NIR)	6	2	4	10	15	−5	Eliminated from the competition
7	Matthew Selt (ENG)	6	1	5	8	17	−9	Eliminated from the competition

Source: 2022 Championship League Snooker Group 6

=== Play-offs ===
Semi-finals; Best of 5 frames
Yan Bingtao (CHN)	3
Kyren Wilson (ENG)	0
Martin Gould (ENG)	3
Ding Junhui (CHN)	2

Final; Best of 5 frames
Yan Bingtao (CHN)	3
Martin Gould (ENG)	1

== Group 7 ==
Group 7 was played on 1 and 2 February 2022. Neil Robertson was due to take part in this group, but withdrew and was replaced by Ricky Walden. John Higgins won the group and qualified for the Winners' Group.

=== Matches ===
- Ronnie O'Sullivan 0–3 Kyren Wilson
- Ricky Walden 0–3 Ali Carter
- Ronnie O'Sullivan 0–3 John Higgins
- Martin Gould 1–3 Ding Junhui
- Ricky Walden 1–3 John Higgins
- Kyren Wilson 3–0 Martin Gould
- Ronnie O'Sullivan 3–2 Ricky Walden
- Ali Carter 1–3 Ding Junhui
- Ricky Walden 1–3 Kyren Wilson
- John Higgins 0–3 Ali Carter
- Kyren Wilson 3–0 Ding Junhui
- Ronnie O'Sullivan 2–3 Martin Gould
- Martin Gould 1–3 Ali Carter
- John Higgins 3–2 Ding Junhui
- Kyren Wilson 2–3 Ali Carter
- Ricky Walden 2–3 Ding Junhui
- Kyren Wilson 1–3 John Higgins
- Ricky Walden 3–2 Martin Gould
- Ronnie O'Sullivan 3–2 Ding Junhui
- John Higgins 3–1 Martin Gould
- Ronnie O'Sullivan 2–3 Ali Carter

=== Table ===
Pos	Player	Pld	W	L	FF	FA	FD	
1	Ali Carter (ENG)	6	5	1	16	8	+8	Qualification to Group 7 play-off
2	John Higgins (SCO)	6	5	1	15	8	+7	Qualification to Group 7 play-off
3	Kyren Wilson (ENG)	6	4	2	15	7	+8	Qualification to Group 7 play-off
4	Ding Junhui (CHN)	6	3	3	13	13	0	Qualification to Group 7 play-off
5	Ronnie O'Sullivan (ENG)	6	2	4	10	16	−6	Eliminated from the competition
6	Ricky Walden (ENG)	6	1	5	9	17	−8	Eliminated from the competition
7	Martin Gould (ENG)	6	1	5	8	17	−9	Eliminated from the competition

Source: 2022 Championship League Snooker Group 7

=== Play-offs ===
Semi-finals; Best of 5 frames
Ali Carter (ENG)	2
Ding Junhui (CHN)	3
John Higgins (SCO)	3
Kyren Wilson (ENG)	1

Final; Best of 5 frames
Ding Junhui (CHN)	2
John Higgins (SCO)	3

== Winners' Group ==
The Winners' Group was played on 3 and 4 February 2022. John Higgins won the Championship League for a third time, beating Stuart Bingham 3–2 in the final.

=== Matches ===
- John Higgins 3–2 Graeme Dott
- Stuart Bingham 3–2 Yan Bingtao
- John Higgins 3–1 Zhao Xintong
- Liang Wenbo 3–0 Scott Donaldson
- Zhao Xintong 0–3 Stuart Bingham
- Graeme Dott 0–3 Scott Donaldson
- John Higgins 2–3 Stuart Bingham
- Yan Bingtao 3–0 Liang Wenbo
- Stuart Bingham 3–2 Graeme Dott
- Zhao Xintong 3–2 Yan Bingtao
- Graeme Dott 3–2 Liang Wenbo
- John Higgins 3–2 Scott Donaldson
- Yan Bingtao 3–0 Scott Donaldson
- Zhao Xintong 3–1 Liang Wenbo
- Yan Bingtao 3–0 Graeme Dott
- Stuart Bingham 0–3 Liang Wenbo
- Zhao Xintong 1–3 Graeme Dott
- Stuart Bingham 3–0 Scott Donaldson
- John Higgins 3–1 Liang Wenbo
- Zhao Xintong 2–3 Scott Donaldson
- John Higgins 0–3 Yan Bingtao

=== Table ===
Pos	Player	Pld	W	L	FF	FA	FD	
1	Stuart Bingham (ENG)	6	5	1	15	9	+6	Qualification to Winners' Group play-off
2	Yan Bingtao (CHN)	6	4	2	16	6	+10	Qualification to Winners' Group play-off
3	John Higgins (SCO)	6	4	2	14	12	+2	Qualification to Winners' Group play-off
4	Liang Wenbo (CHN)	6	2	4	10	12	−2	Qualification to Winners' Group play-off
5	Graeme Dott (SCO)	6	2	4	10	15	−5	Eliminated from the competition
6	Zhao Xintong (CHN)	6	2	4	10	15	−5	Eliminated from the competition
7	Scott Donaldson (SCO)	6	2	4	8	14	−6	Eliminated from the competition

Source: 2022 Championship League Snooker Winners' Group

=== Play-offs ===
Semi-finals; Best of 5 frames
Stuart Bingham (ENG)	3
Liang Wenbo (CHN) (Note: Liang Wenbo was docked the first frame for being late, so only four frames were physically played.)	2
Yan Bingtao (CHN)	2
John Higgins (SCO)	3

Final; Best of 5 frames
Stuart Bingham (ENG)	2
John Higgins (SCO)	3

== Century breaks ==
A total of 127 century breaks were made during the tournament.

- **143** (W), 138, 125, 122, 100 – Zhao Xintong
- 142, 138, 138, 135, 128, 114, 111, 110 – Yan Bingtao
- **142** (2), 132, 122, 113, 110, 101, 101, 100 – Ryan Day
- **141** (7), **140** (6) – Ali Carter
- 141, **139** (3), 137, 133, 130, 119, 110, 108, 104, 102, 100 – Stuart Bingham
- **140** (6), 135, 134, 129, 128, 128, 121, 119, 118, 112, 102, 100 – Kyren Wilson
- 140, 131, 117, 116, 113, 112, 111, 101 – Xiao Guodong
- 140, 118, 112, 106, 103, 100 – Jack Lisowski
- 138, 134, 134, 131, 131, 127, 105, 101 – Ding Junhui
- **138** (4), 114, 111, 104, 101 – Lu Ning
- **136** (1), 119, 116 – Zhou Yuelong
- **136** (1), 108, 106, 101 – Liang Wenbo
- 134, 112, 112, 112, 102, 102, 100, 100 – John Higgins
- **132** (5), 130, 129, 118, 103 – Scott Donaldson
- 132, 110, 108 – Ricky Walden
- 131, 129, 127, 125, 108, 100 – Mark Selby
- 127 – David Gilbert
- 123, 123, 103 – Joe Perry
- 123 – Tom Ford
- 122, 115, 101 – Martin Gould
- 118, 117, 111, 105 – Gary Wilson
- 117, 108, 101, 101 – Jordan Brown
- 116, 106 – Ronnie O'Sullivan
- 111, 101, 100, 100 – Graeme Dott
- 110 – Matthew Selt
- 107, 103 – Judd Trump

Bold: highest break in the indicated group.

== Winnings ==
No.	Player	1	2	3	4	5	6	7	W	TOTAL
1	John Higgins (SCO) (7)							6,300	14,600	20,900
2	Stuart Bingham (ENG) (14)			**3,200**	6,100				9,500	18,800
3	Kyren Wilson (ENG) (5)				5,300	2,800	**2,550**	2,800		13,450
4	Yan Bingtao (CHN) (16)						6,500		6,800	13,300
5	Liang Wenbo (CHN) (37)	**6,550**							5,600	12,150
6	Graeme Dott (SCO) (19)	3,100	6,200						2,000	11,300
7	Scott Donaldson (SCO) (35)				2,100	**6,900**			1,600	10,600
8	Zhao Xintong (CHN) (9)			6,600					**3,000**	9,600
9	Lu Ning (CHN) (31)		4,700	1,200	**1,600**	800				8,300
10	Ding Junhui (CHN) (27)						2,900	4,800		7,700
11	Ryan Day (WAL) (26)	2,900	**3,700**	600						7,200
12	Ali Carter (ENG) (22)					2,100	**1,250**	**3,700**		7,050
13	Xiao Guodong (CHN) (30)		1,300	4,900	700					6,900
14	Martin Gould (ENG) (21)					1,000	4,600	800		6,400
15	Jordan Brown (NIR) (28)					5,100	1,000			6,100
16	Mark Selby (ENG)^{(a)} (1)			2,700	3,300					6,000
17	Jack Lisowski (ENG) (13)	4,300	1,300							5,600
18	Joe Perry (ENG) (32)		2,800	900						3,700
19	Gary Wilson (ENG) (25)	1,200	800							2,000
20	Zhou Yuelong (CHN) (17)	**1,350**								1,350
21	David Gilbert (ENG) (20)					1,200				1,200
22	Tom Ford (ENG) (24)	1,100								1,100
23	Judd Trump (ENG) (2)				1,000					1,000
=	Ronnie O'Sullivan (ENG) (3)							1,000		1,000
25	Ricky Walden (ENG) (23)							900		900
26	Matthew Selt (ENG) (29)						800			800
	Total prize money	20,500	20,800	20,100	20,100	19,900	19,600	20,300	43,100	184,400

Green: Won the group. Bold: Highest break in the group. All prize money in GBP.
Parenthesis: Ranking prior to tournament start, 19 December 2021.
Notes
^{(a)} Mark Selby withdrew from the tournament prior to group 5 play.
