= 2021 Championship League (invitational) =

BetVictor Championship League Invitational
Tournament information
- Dates: 4 January – 2 April 2021
- Venue: Ballroom, Stadium MK
- City: Milton Keynes
- Country: England
- Organisation: Matchroom Sport
- Format: Non-ranking event
- Total prize fund: £182,700
- Winner's share: £10,000 (plus bonuses)
- Highest break: Stuart Bingham (ENG) (147)

Final
- Champion: Kyren Wilson (ENG)
- Runner-up: Mark Williams (WAL)
- Score: 3–2

The 2021 Championship League Invitational was a professional non-ranking snooker tournament, that took place from 4 January to 2 April 2021 in the Ballroom, Stadium MK in Milton Keynes, England. It is the 16th staging of the tournament.

On the first day of the tournament Stuart Bingham made the eighth career maximum break. He accomplished the feat in the second frame of his Group 1 win over Thepchaiya Un-Nooh.

Kyren Wilson was the defending champion, having defeated Judd Trump 3–1 in the final of the ranking edition of the tournament.

Wilson successfully defended the title, coming from 0–2 down in his last Winners group game, the semi-final and the final to win all three matches 3–2. He defeated Mark Williams 3–2 in the final to win the tournament.

== Tournament format ==
The Championship League event sees 25 professionals take part, with players earning prize money for every frame won. Matches are best of five frames, and the league is played from January to April 2021.

The competition runs over eight groups, each consisting of seven players. From each group the top four qualify for a play-off, and the winners of the first seven play-offs qualify for the winners group. The bottom two players of each group are eliminated and the remaining four move to the next group, where they are joined by three more players until the seventh group. The winners play in the final group, and the winner of the Winners' Group play-off takes the title and a place at the 2021 Champion of Champions.

=== Prize fund ===
The breakdown of prize money for the 2021 Championship League is shown below.

Groups 1–7

- Winner: £3,000
- Runner-up: £2,000
- Semi-final: £1,000
- Frame-win (league stage): £100
- Frame-win (play-offs): £300
- Highest break: £500

Winners' Group

- Winner: £10,000
- Runner-up: £5,000
- Semi-final: £3,000
- Frame-win (league stage): £200
- Frame-win (play-offs): £300
- Highest break: £1,000

- Tournament total: £182,700

== Group 1 ==
Group 1 was played on 4 and 5 January 2021. Zhou Yuelong won the group and qualified for the Winners' Group.

=== Matches ===
- John Higgins 3–2 Stuart Bingham
- Michael Holt 1–3 Thepchaiya Un-Nooh
- John Higgins 3–0 Gary Wilson
- Zhou Yuelong 2–3 Graeme Dott
- Stuart Bingham 3–2 Michael Holt
- Gary Wilson 2–3 Graeme Dott
- John Higgins 3–1 Michael Holt
- Thepchaiya Un-Nooh 2–3 Zhou Yuelong
- Michael Holt 1–3 Gary Wilson
- Stuart Bingham 3–0 Thepchaiya Un-Nooh
- Gary Wilson 3–2 Zhou Yuelong
- John Higgins 3–2 Graeme Dott
- Thepchaiya Un-Nooh 2–3 Graeme Dott
- Stuart Bingham 2–3 Zhou Yuelong
- Thepchaiya Un-Nooh 3–2 Gary Wilson
- Michael Holt 0–3 Zhou Yuelong
- Stuart Bingham 3–2 Gary Wilson
- Michael Holt 1–3 Graeme Dott
- John Higgins 0–3 Zhou Yuelong
- Stuart Bingham 3–1 Graeme Dott
- John Higgins 3–0 Thepchaiya Un-Nooh

=== Table ===
Pos	Player	Pld	W	L	FF	FA	FD	
1	John Higgins (SCO)	6	5	1	15	8	+7	Qualification to Group 1 play-off
2	Zhou Yuelong (CHN)	6	4	2	16	10	+6	Qualification to Group 1 play-off
3	Stuart Bingham (ENG)	6	4	2	16	11	+5	Qualification to Group 1 play-off
4	Graeme Dott (SCO)	6	4	2	15	13	+2	Qualification to Group 1 play-off
5	Gary Wilson (ENG)	6	2	4	12	15	−3	Advances into Group 2
6	Thepchaiya Un-Nooh (THA)	6	2	4	10	15	−5	Eliminated from the competition
7	Michael Holt (ENG)	6	0	6	6	18	−12	Eliminated from the competition

Source: Championship League Snooker

=== Play-offs ===
Semi-finals; Best of 5 frames
John Higgins (SCO)	3
Graeme Dott (SCO)	1
Zhou Yuelong (CHN)	3
Stuart Bingham (ENG)	0

Final; Best of 5 frames
John Higgins (SCO)	2
Zhou Yuelong (CHN)	3

== Group 2 ==
Group 2 was played on 6 and 7 January 2021. Graeme Dott won the group and qualified for the Winners' Group.

=== Matches ===
- Kyren Wilson 3–1 Scott Donaldson
- Matthew Selt 3–1 Gary Wilson
- Kyren Wilson 0–3 Graeme Dott
- Stuart Bingham 2–3 John Higgins
- Matthew Selt 1–3 Scott Donaldson
- Graeme Dott 2–3 John Higgins
- Kyren Wilson 1–3 Matthew Selt
- Gary Wilson 3–1 Stuart Bingham
- Matthew Selt 3–1 Graeme Dott
- Scott Donaldson 3–0 Gary Wilson
- Graeme Dott 3–2 Stuart Bingham
- Kyren Wilson 2–3 John Higgins
- Gary Wilson 1–3 John Higgins
- Scott Donaldson 3–1 Stuart Bingham
- Gary Wilson 1–3 Graeme Dott
- Matthew Selt 1–3 Stuart Bingham
- Scott Donaldson 3–2 Graeme Dott
- Matthew Selt 3–0 John Higgins
- Kyren Wilson 3–2 Stuart Bingham
- Kyren Wilson 2–3 Gary Wilson
- Scott Donaldson 1–3 John Higgins

=== Table ===
Pos	Player	Pld	W	L	FF	FA	FD	
1	John Higgins (SCO)	6	5	1	15	11	+4	Qualification to Group 2 play-off
2	Matthew Selt (ENG)	6	4	2	14	9	+5	Qualification to Group 2 play-off
3	Scott Donaldson (SCO)	6	4	2	14	10	+4	Qualification to Group 2 play-off
4	Graeme Dott (SCO)	6	3	3	14	12	+2	Qualification to Group 2 play-off
5	Kyren Wilson (ENG)	6	2	4	11	15	−4	Advances into Group 3
6	Gary Wilson (ENG)	6	2	4	9	15	−6	Eliminated from the competition
7	Stuart Bingham (ENG)	6	1	5	11	16	−5	Eliminated from the competition

Source: Championship League Snooker

=== Play-offs ===
Semi-finals; Best of 5 frames
John Higgins (SCO)	2
Graeme Dott (SCO)	3
Matthew Selt (ENG)	0
Scott Donaldson (SCO)	3

Final; Best of 5 frames
Graeme Dott (SCO)	3
Scott Donaldson (SCO)	1

== Group 3 ==
Group 3 was played on 8 and 9 January 2021. John Higgins won the group and qualified for the Winners' Group.

=== Matches ===
- Mark Selby 3–1 Zhao Xintong
- Tom Ford 1–3 Kyren Wilson
- Zhao Xintong 3–2 John Higgins
- Matthew Selt 0–3 Scott Donaldson
- Mark Selby 0–3 Tom Ford
- John Higgins 3–1 Scott Donaldson
- Zhao Xintong 2–3 Tom Ford
- Kyren Wilson 3–2 Matthew Selt
- Tom Ford 2–3 John Higgins
- Mark Selby 3–0 Kyren Wilson
- John Higgins 3–0 Matthew Selt
- Zhao Xintong 3–2 Scott Donaldson
- Kyren Wilson 3–2 Scott Donaldson
- Mark Selby 0–3 Matthew Selt
- Kyren Wilson 1–3 John Higgins
- Tom Ford 0–3 Matthew Selt
- Mark Selby 3–2 John Higgins
- Tom Ford 3–1 Scott Donaldson
- Zhao Xintong 3–2 Matthew Selt
- Mark Selby 2–3 Scott Donaldson
- Zhao Xintong 1–3 Kyren Wilson

=== Table ===
Pos	Player	Pld	W	L	FF	FA	FD	
1	John Higgins (SCO)	6	4	2	16	10	+6	Qualification to Group 3 play-off
2	Kyren Wilson (ENG)	6	4	2	13	12	+1	Qualification to Group 3 play-off
3	Zhao Xintong (CHN)	6	3	3	13	15	−2	Qualification to Group 3 play-off
4	Tom Ford (ENG)	6	3	3	12	12	0	Qualification to Group 3 play-off
5	Mark Selby (ENG)	6	3	3	11	12	−1	Advances into Group 4
6	Scott Donaldson (SCO)	6	2	4	12	14	−2	Eliminated from the competition
7	Matthew Selt (ENG)	6	2	4	10	12	−2	Eliminated from the competition

Source: Championship League Snooker

=== Play-offs ===
Semi-finals; Best of 5 frames
John Higgins (SCO)	3
Tom Ford (ENG)	2
Kyren Wilson (ENG)	3
Zhao Xintong (CHN)	1

Final; Best of 5 frames
John Higgins (SCO)	3
Kyren Wilson (ENG)	0

== Group 4 ==
Group 4 was played on 8 and 9 February 2021. Judd Trump won the group and qualified for the Winners' Group.

=== Matches ===
- Judd Trump 3–0 Mark Williams
- Mark Selby 3–1 Jack Lisowski
- Judd Trump 3–2 Tom Ford
- Kyren Wilson 3–1 Barry Hawkins
- Jack Lisowski 1–3 Mark Williams
- Kyren Wilson 2–3 Tom Ford
- Judd Trump 2–3 Jack Lisowski
- Mark Selby 0–3 Barry Hawkins
- Jack Lisowski 0–3 Tom Ford
- Mark Selby 3–2 Mark Williams
- Barry Hawkins 3–2 Tom Ford
- Judd Trump 1–3 Kyren Wilson
- Mark Selby 3–0 Kyren Wilson
- Mark Williams 1–3 Barry Hawkins
- Mark Selby 3–1 Tom Ford
- Jack Lisowski 3–1 Barry Hawkins
- Mark Williams 3–2 Tom Ford
- Kyren Wilson 3–0 Jack Lisowski
- Judd Trump 3–0 Barry Hawkins
- Kyren Wilson 0–3 Mark Williams
- Judd Trump 3–0 Mark Selby

Note

Zhao Xintong, who had qualified from group 3, withdrew from the tournament prior to group 4 play.

=== Table ===
Pos	Player	Pld	W	L	FF	FA	FD	
1	Judd Trump (ENG)	6	4	2	15	8	+7	Qualification to Group 4 play-off
2	Mark Selby (ENG)	6	4	2	12	10	+2	Qualification to Group 4 play-off
3	Mark Williams (WAL)	6	3	3	12	12	0	Qualification to Group 4 play-off
4	Kyren Wilson (ENG)	6	3	3	11	11	0	Qualification to Group 4 play-off
5	Barry Hawkins (ENG)	6	3	3	11	12	−1	Advances into Group 5
6	Tom Ford (ENG)	6	2	4	13	14	−1	Eliminated from the competition
7	Jack Lisowski (ENG)	6	2	4	8	15	−7	Eliminated from the competition

Source: Championship League Snooker

=== Play-offs ===
Semi-finals; Best of 5 frames
Judd Trump (ENG)	3
Kyren Wilson (ENG)	2
Mark Selby (ENG)	3
Mark Williams (WAL)	2

Final; Best of 5 frames
Judd Trump (ENG)	3
Mark Selby (ENG)	0

== Group 5 ==
Group 5 was played on 10 and 11 February 2021. Kyren Wilson won the group and qualified for the Winners' Group.

=== Matches ===
- Ronnie O'Sullivan 3–0 Joe Perry
- Barry Hawkins 1–3 Ali Carter
- Ronnie O'Sullivan 3–0 Kyren Wilson
- Mark Selby 2–3 Mark Williams
- Joe Perry 2–3 Ali Carter
- Mark Selby 2–3 Kyren Wilson
- Mark Williams 3–1 Barry Hawkins
- Ronnie O'Sullivan 3–1 Ali Carter
- Barry Hawkins 1–3 Joe Perry
- Kyren Wilson 1–3 Ali Carter
- Ronnie O'Sullivan 3–1 Mark Selby
- Kyren Wilson 3–2 Mark Williams
- Mark Selby 2–3 Barry Hawkins
- Mark Williams 0–3 Joe Perry
- Kyren Wilson 3–1 Barry Hawkins
- Mark Williams 1–3 Ali Carter
- Kyren Wilson 3–2 Joe Perry
- Mark Selby 0–3 Ali Carter
- Ronnie O'Sullivan 1–3 Mark Williams
- Mark Selby 3–1 Joe Perry
- Ronnie O'Sullivan 1–3 Barry Hawkins

=== Table ===
Pos	Player	Pld	W	L	FF	FA	FD	
1	Ali Carter (ENG)	6	5	1	16	8	+8	Qualification to Group 5 play-off
2	Ronnie O'Sullivan (ENG)	6	4	2	14	8	+6	Qualification to Group 5 play-off
3	Kyren Wilson (ENG)	6	4	2	13	13	0	Qualification to Group 5 play-off
4	Mark Williams (WAL)	6	3	3	12	13	−1	Qualification to Group 5 play-off
5	Joe Perry (ENG)	6	2	4	11	13	−2	Advances into Group 6
6	Barry Hawkins (ENG)	6	2	4	10	15	−5	Eliminated from the competition
7	Mark Selby (ENG)	6	1	5	10	16	−6	Eliminated from the competition

Source: Championship League Snooker

=== Play-offs ===
Semi-finals; Best of 5 frames
Ali Carter (ENG)	1
Mark Williams (WAL)	3
Ronnie O'Sullivan (ENG)	2
Kyren Wilson (ENG)	3

Final; Best of 5 frames
Mark Williams (WAL)	2
Kyren Wilson (ENG)	3

== Group 6 ==
Group 6 was played on 12 and 13 February 2021. Ali Carter won the group and qualified for the Winners' Group.

=== Matches ===
- David Gilbert 3–0 Liang Wenbo
- Anthony McGill 3–2 Joe Perry
- Liang Wenbo 2–3 Li Hang
- Mark Williams 0–3 Ali Carter
- David Gilbert 2–3 Anthony McGill
- Mark Williams 3–1 Li Hang
- Anthony McGill 1–3 Liang Wenbo
- Joe Perry 0–3 Ali Carter
- Anthony McGill 3–1 Li Hang
- David Gilbert 3–2 Joe Perry
- Ali Carter 3–1 Li Hang
- Mark Williams 3–2 Liang Wenbo
- Mark Williams 0–3 Joe Perry
- David Gilbert 0–3 Ali Carter
- Joe Perry 3–1 Li Hang
- Anthony McGill 3–2 Ali Carter
- David Gilbert 3–2 Li Hang
- Mark Williams 2–3 Anthony McGill
- Ali Carter 3–2 Liang Wenbo
- Mark Williams 3–1 David Gilbert
- Joe Perry 2–3 Liang Wenbo

Note

Ronnie O'Sullivan, who had qualified from group 5, withdrew from the tournament prior to group 6 play.

=== Table ===
Pos	Player	Pld	W	L	FF	FA	FD	
1	Ali Carter (ENG)	6	5	1	17	6	+11	Qualification to Group 6 play-off
2	Anthony McGill (SCO)	6	5	1	16	12	+4	Qualification to Group 6 play-off
3	David Gilbert (ENG)	6	3	3	12	13	−1	Qualification to Group 6 play-off
4	Mark Williams (WAL)	6	3	3	11	13	−2	Qualification to Group 6 play-off
5	Joe Perry (ENG)	6	2	4	12	13	−1	Advances into Group 7
6	Liang Wenbo (CHN)	6	2	4	12	15	−3	Eliminated from the competition
7	Li Hang (CHN)	6	1	5	9	17	−8	Eliminated from the competition

Source: Championship League Snooker

=== Play-offs ===
Semi-finals; Best of 5 frames
Ali Carter (ENG)	3
Mark Williams (WAL)	2
Anthony McGill (SCO)	3
David Gilbert (ENG)	1

Final; Best of 5 frames
Ali Carter (ENG)	3
Anthony McGill (SCO)	2

== Group 7 ==
Group 7 was played on 30 and 31 March 2021. Mark Williams won the group and qualified for the Winners' Group.

=== Matches ===
- Yan Bingtao 3–1 Kurt Maflin
- Neil Robertson 1–3 Joe Perry
- Mark Williams 3–1 Kurt Maflin
- David Gilbert 3–1 Anthony McGill
- Neil Robertson 2–3 Yan Bingtao
- Mark Williams 2–3 Anthony McGill
- Neil Robertson 3–2 Kurt Maflin
- David Gilbert 3–2 Joe Perry
- Neil Robertson 0–3 Mark Williams
- Yan Bingtao 3–1 Joe Perry
- Mark Williams 3–1 David Gilbert
- Anthony McGill 3–1 Kurt Maflin
- Anthony McGill 1–3 Joe Perry
- Yan Bingtao 3–1 David Gilbert
- Mark Williams 3–2 Joe Perry
- Neil Robertson 2–3 David Gilbert
- Yan Bingtao 3–1 Mark Williams
- Neil Robertson 1–3 Anthony McGill
- David Gilbert 3–0 Kurt Maflin
- Yan Bingtao 3–1 Anthony McGill
- Joe Perry 3–2 Kurt Maflin

=== Table ===
Pos	Player	Pld	W	L	FF	FA	FD	
1	Yan Bingtao (CHN)	6	6	0	18	7	+11	Qualification to Group 7 play-off
2	Mark Williams (WAL)	6	4	2	15	10	+5	Qualification to Group 7 play-off
3	David Gilbert (ENG)	6	4	2	14	11	+3	Qualification to Group 7 play-off
4	Joe Perry (ENG)	6	3	3	14	13	+1	Qualification to Group 7 play-off
5	Anthony McGill (SCO)	6	3	3	12	13	−1	Eliminated from the competition
6	Neil Robertson (AUS)	6	1	5	9	17	−8	Eliminated from the competition
7	Kurt Maflin (NOR)	6	0	6	7	18	−11	Eliminated from the competition

Source: Championship League Snooker

=== Play-offs ===
Semi-finals; Best of 5 frames
Yan Bingtao (CHN)	0
Joe Perry (ENG)	3
Mark Williams (WAL)	3
David Gilbert (ENG)	1

Final; Best of 5 frames
Joe Perry (ENG)	1
Mark Williams (WAL)	3

== Winners' Group ==
The Winners' Group was played on 1 and 2 April 2021. Kyren Wilson defended his Championship League title, defeating Mark Williams 3–2 in the final.

=== Matches ===
- Judd Trump 1–3 Zhou Yuelong
- John Higgins 3–1 Mark Williams
- Zhou Yuelong 2–3 Graeme Dott
- Kyren Wilson 1–3 Ali Carter
- John Higgins 3–1 Graeme Dott
- Judd Trump 3–0 Ali Carter
- John Higgins 3–0 Zhou Yuelong
- Kyren Wilson 3–2 Mark Williams
- Judd Trump 3–1 John Higgins
- Mark Williams 2–3 Graeme Dott
- Judd Trump 2–3 Kyren Wilson
- Zhou Yuelong 1–3 Ali Carter
- Mark Williams 3–1 Ali Carter
- Kyren Wilson 2–3 Graeme Dott
- Judd Trump 1–3 Mark Williams
- John Higgins 3–0 Kyren Wilson
- Judd Trump 0–3 Graeme Dott
- John Higgins 3–0 Ali Carter
- Kyren Wilson 3–2 Zhou Yuelong
- Graeme Dott 3–0 Ali Carter
- Mark Williams 3–1 Zhou Yuelong

=== Table ===
Pos	Player	Pld	W	L	FF	FA	FD	
1	John Higgins (SCO)	6	5	1	16	5	+11	Qualification to Winners' Group play-off
2	Graeme Dott (SCO)	6	5	1	16	9	+7	Qualification to Winners' Group play-off
3	Mark Williams (WAL)	6	3	3	14	12	+2	Qualification to Winners' Group play-off
4	Kyren Wilson (ENG)	6	3	3	12	15	−3	Qualification to Winners' Group play-off
5	Judd Trump (ENG)	6	2	4	10	13	−3	Eliminated from the competition
6	Ali Carter (ENG)	6	2	4	7	14	−7	Eliminated from the competition
7	Zhou Yuelong (CHN)	6	1	5	9	16	−7	Eliminated from the competition

Source: Championship League Snooker

=== Play-offs ===
Semi-finals; Best of 5 frames
John Higgins (SCO)	2
Kyren Wilson (ENG)	3
Graeme Dott (SCO)	0
Mark Williams (WAL)	3

Final; Best of 5 frames
Kyren Wilson (ENG)	3
Mark Williams (WAL)	2

== Century breaks ==
Total: A total of 147 century breaks were made during the tournament.

- **147** (1), 136, 132, 127, 112 – Stuart Bingham
- **144** (5), 137, 137, 133, 109, 108, 101 – Mark Selby
- **144** (3), 110, 104, 100 – Zhao Xintong
- **143** (W), 142, 142, 136, 135, 133, 132, 130, 129, 128, 126, 126, 124, 123, 121, 116, 113, 110, 107, 105, 103, 100, 100 – Kyren Wilson
- **143** (2), 138, 103 – Gary Wilson
- **142** (4), 131, 131, 113, 101 – Tom Ford
- 142, 104, 104 – Matthew Selt
- 141, 135, 106, 103 – Graeme Dott
- 141, 115, 111, 109, 106, 104, 102 – Ali Carter
- 140, 132, 125, 124, 122, 114, 102 – Ronnie O'Sullivan
- **139** (7), **138** (6), 134, 133, 131, 127, 127, 122, 120, 114, 114, 110, 108, 106, 106, 105, 103, 102 – Mark Williams
- 138, 137, 131, 131, 120, 116, 115, 108, 102, 102, 100 – Judd Trump
- 137, 131, 127, 119, 112, 112, 105, 105, 104, 103, 101, 100 – John Higgins
- 133, 118, 111, 105, 105, 101, 100 – David Gilbert
- 133 – Kurt Maflin
- 131, 131, 125, 113, 110 – Zhou Yuelong
- 130, 122, 103 – Scott Donaldson
- 128, 125 – Yan Bingtao
- 123, 116, 113, 110, 109, 101 – Anthony McGill
- 120, 114, 109, 107 – Joe Perry
- 114 – Barry Hawkins
- 107, 106, 105, 105 – Thepchaiya Un-Nooh
- 105, 104, 100, 100 – Neil Robertson
- 104 – Jack Lisowski

Bold: highest break in the indicated group.

== Winnings ==
No.	Player	1	2	3	4	5	6	7	W	TOTAL
1	Kyren Wilson (ENG) (5)		1,100	4,200	2,700	6,100			**15,200**	29,300
2	Mark Williams (WAL) (15)				2,800	4,700	**3,200**	**6,800**	9,300	26,800
3	John Higgins (SCO) (6)	5,000	3,100	6,400					6,800	21,300
4	Graeme Dott (SCO) (23)	2800	6,200						6,200	15,200
5	Ali Carter (ENG) (22)					2,900	6,500		1,400	10,800
6	Judd Trump (ENG) (1)				6,300				2,000	8,300
7	Zhou Yuelong (CHN) (21)	6,400							1,800	8,200
8	Joe Perry (ENG) (19)					1,100	1,200	4,600		6,900
9	Mark Selby (ENG) (4)			1,100	4,100	**1,500**				6,700
10	Anthony McGill (SCO) (17)						5,100	1,200		6,300
11	Scott Donaldson (SCO) (24)		4,600	1,200						5,800
12	David Gilbert (ENG) (13)						2,500	2,700		5,200
13	Tom Ford (ENG) (29)			2,800	**1,800**					4,600
14	Stuart Bingham (ENG) (12)	**3,100**	1,100							4,200
15	Matthew Selt (ENG) (26)		2,400	1,000						3,400
16	Zhao Xintong (CHN)^{(a)} (28)			**3,100**						3,100
17	Ronnie O'Sullivan (ENG)^{(b)} (3)					3,000				3,000
18	Yan Bingtao (CHN) (11)							2,800		2,800
19	Gary Wilson (ENG) (20)	1,200	**1,400**							2,600
20	Barry Hawkins (ENG) (23)				1,100	1,000				2,100
21	Liang Wenbo (CHN) (29)						1,200			1,200
22	Thepchaiya Un-Nooh (THA) (16)	1,000								1,000
23	Neil Robertson (AUS) (2)							900		900
=	Li Hang (CHN) (30)						900			900
25	Jack Lisowski (ENG) (14)				800					800
26	Kurt Maflin (NOR) (25)							700		700
27	Michael Holt (ENG) (27)	600								600
	Total prize money	20,100	19,900	19,800	19,600	20,300	20,600	19,700	42,700	182,700

Green: Won the group. Bold: Highest break in the group. All prize money in GBP.
Parenthesis: Ranking prior to tournament start, 4 January 2021.
Notes
^{(a)} Zhao Xintong withdrew from the tournament prior to group 4 play.
^{(b)} Ronnie O'Sullivan withdrew from the tournament prior to group 6 play.
