= 2007 Welsh Open (snooker) =

Snooker tournament

Tournament information
- Dates: 12–18 February 2007
- Venue: Newport Centre
- City: Newport
- Country: Wales
- Organisation: World Professional Billiards and Snooker Association
- Format: Ranking event
- Total prize fund: £225,500
- Winner's share: £35,000
- Highest break: Andrew Higginson (ENG) (147)

Final
- Champion: Neil Robertson (AUS)
- Runner-up: Andrew Higginson (ENG)
- Score: 9–8

The 2007 Welsh Open was the 2007 edition of the Welsh Open professional snooker tournament and was held from 12 to 18 February 2007 at the Newport Centre in Newport, South East Wales. It was the 16th staging of the competition since 1992 and the tenth time it took place at the Newport Centre. The tournament was the fifth of seven World Professional Billiards and Snooker Association (WPBSA) ranking events in the 2006/2007 season. The host broadcasters were BBC Cymru Wales and Eurosport.

Grand Prix winner Neil Robertson won the tournament, defeating 500–1 outsider Andrew Higginson, who was in only his third appearance in the main stages of a professional competition, nine frames to eight (9–8) in the final. It was Roberston's second ranking tournament victory, becoming the fourth non-British and Irish player to win more than one ranking title. Robertson won against Michael Holt and world champions Stephen Hendry, Ronnie O'Sullivan and Steve Davis en route to the final. Higginson achieved the tournament's highest break with a maximum break in the second frame of his quarter-final match with Ali Carter. The Welsh Open preceded the China Open and followed the Malta Cup.

== Tournament summary ==
=== Background ===
The Welsh Open began as a ranking tournament in 1992 initially in February, occurring after the Masters, but later replaced the Classic in January. The event was sponsored by the cigarette brand Regal until 2003 (known as the Regal Welsh Open), but UK restrictions on tobacco advertising left it unsponsored until 2009. The Welsh Cup was first held at the Newport Centre in Newport in 1992 before it moved to the Cardiff International Arena (now called Motorpoint Arena Cardiff) in 1999. It was held at the Welsh Institute of Sport in 2004 and returned to the Newport Centre in 2005.

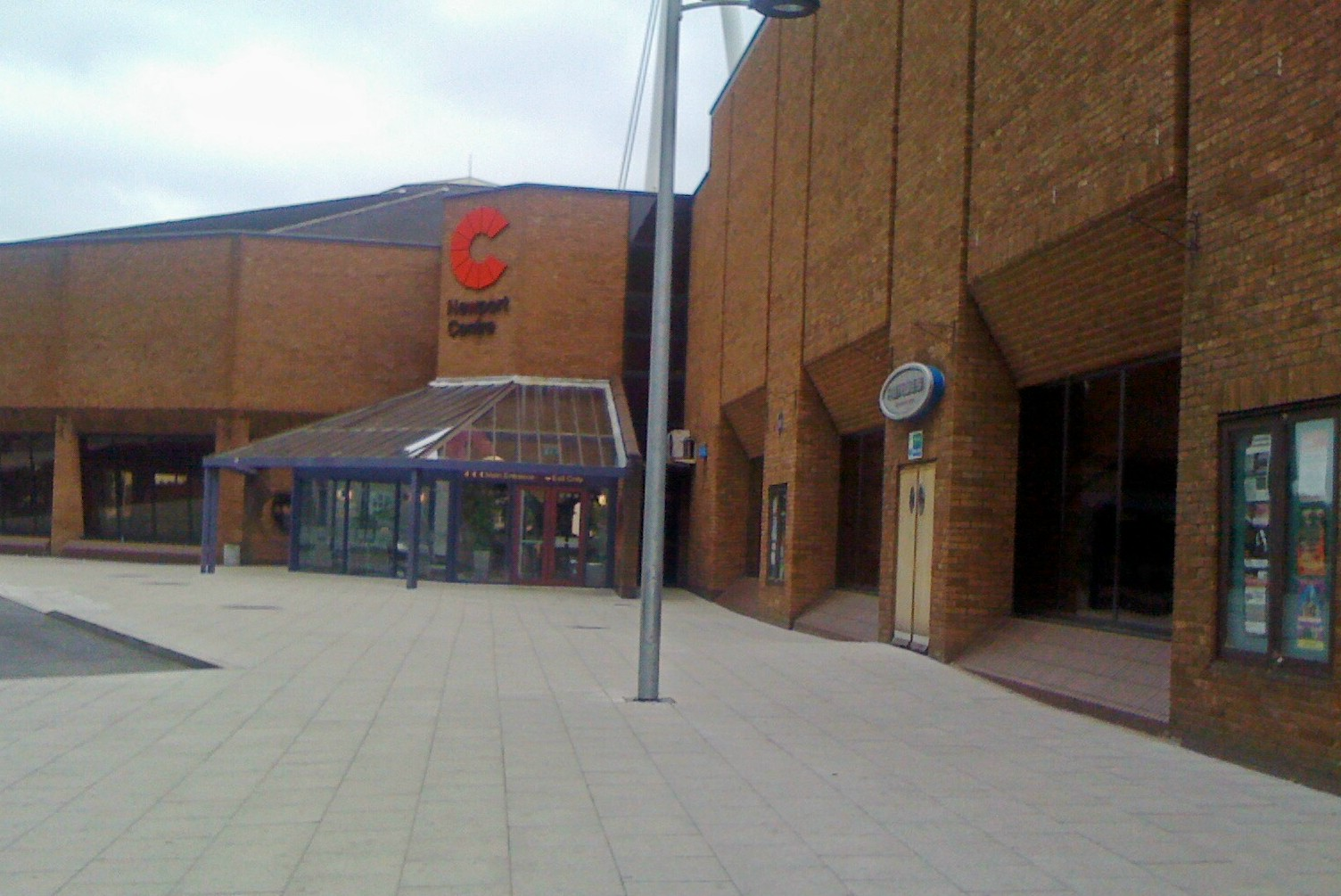
The Newport Centre (pictured in 2008), where the tournament was held.

The 2007 tournament took place at the Newport Centre in Newport, South East Wales between 12 and 18 February. It was the fifth of seven World Professional Billiards and Snooker Association (WPBSA) ranking competitions in the 2006/2007 season, following the Malta Cup and preceding the China Open. Held between January and February, the Malta Cup was won by 2005 world champion Shaun Murphy, who defeated Ryan Day by nine frames to four (9–4) in the final. The defending Welsh Open champion from 2006 was Stephen Lee, who defeated Murphy by the same scoreline. The total prize fund was £225,500, and the host broadcasters were BBC Cymru Wales and Eurosport. All matches were best-of-nine frames until the semi-finals.

Two-time Welsh Open champion Ronnie O'Sullivan was the pre-tournament favourite to win his third title in Wales. Reigning world champion and world number 2 Graeme Dott spoke of his delight to enter the Welsh Open in contention to top the world rankings but vowed not to lose his concentration, "If you have big expectations, they can hamper the way you play and create extra pressure. That's the last thing I want."

=== Qualifying ===
The qualifying rounds were played to the best-of-nine frames between players ranked lower than 32 for one of 16 places in the final stage, at Pontin's Snooker Centre, Prestatyn, Wales from 6 to 8 January 2007. It was contested over three rounds and higher-ranked players received byes to the second and third rounds. Provisional world number 56 Jimmy White narrowly missed out qualifying for the fifth successive tournament of the season with a 5–4 defeat to Mark Allen in the third qualifying round. The successful qualifiers included the 1991 world champion John Parrott, Andrew Higginson, Ricky Walden and Ben Woollaston.

=== Round 1 ===
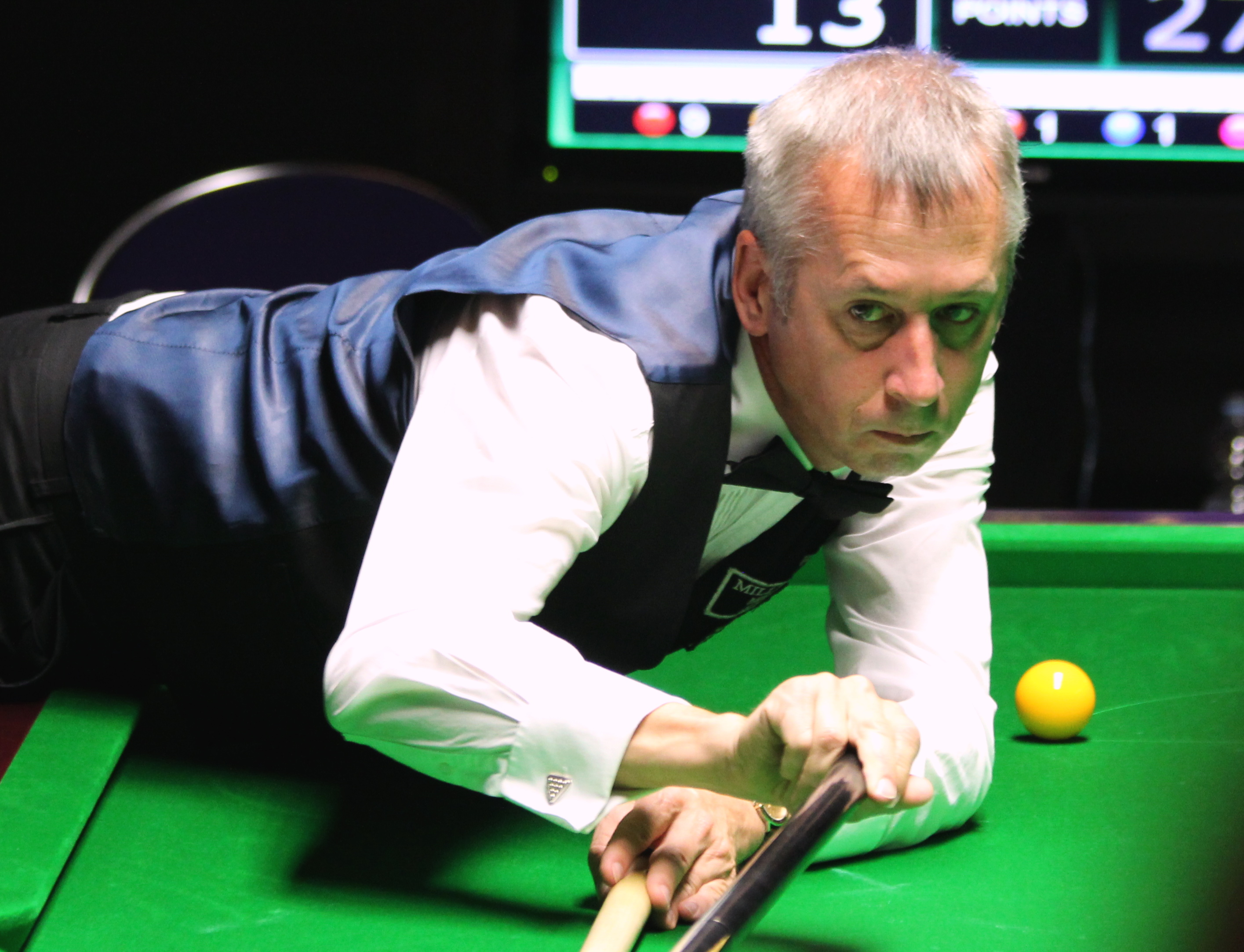
Nigel Bond (pictured in 2016) defeated Liang Wenbo 5–4 in a closely contested match and progressed to the second round

The 16 first-round matches on 12 and 13 February were between players ranked 17–32 and those who had made it through the qualifying stage. In this round Joe Perry came from 2–1 behind with a break of 127 in frame five to defeat Parrott 5–2 after the latter missed a straightforward red ball shot in frame seven, Gerard Greene whitewashed Mark King 5–0, David Gilbert won 5–1 over James Wattana, and Joe Swail defeated Adrian Gunnell by the same scoreline. Woollaston took a surprise 5–1 victory over David Gray as the former World Championship semi-finalist Andy Hicks lost 4–5 to Dave Harold. Breaks of 65, 68, and 70 enabled the 1995 World Championship runner-up and 1996 British Open winner Nigel Bond to edge out Liang Wenbo (who achieved breaks of 86, 56, 48 and 45) 5–3 and avenge his opponent's 5–0 whitewash of him from the 2006 tournament. The two-time Welsh Open runner-up Alan McManus compiled a breaks of 113 and runs of 71 and 54 to defeat Rod Lawler 5–2, bemoaning afterwards of the lack of an audience in the arena because he felt more comfortable playing in front of a larger crowd.

Marco Fu lost his match 2–5 to Higginson after the latter tied 2–2 and compiled a break of 125 along with runs of 70, 67 and 81. Stuart Bingham made a match-winning break of 115 to whitewash Joe Delaney 5–0. Michael Holt achieved breaks of 131, 104 and 115 in defeating Ricky Walden 5–4, as the former World Amateur Champion Ian Preece was whitewashed 5–0 by Mark Selby. Another whitewash occurred when Ryan Day was defeated 5–0 by Michael Judge, a match in which Day's highest break was 24 and Judge compiled a 137 total clearance to win the game. World number 54 Jamie Burnett made a match-high break of 43 en route to winning 5–3 against Robert Milkins. Breaks of 110 and 79 gave Jamie Cope a 5–1 victory over the struggling Ding Junhui. Provisional world number 36 Ian McCulloch trailed Allen 4–2 but breaks of 72, 47 and 74 gave him a 5–4 victory, although he said after the match that he was disappointed with his performance.

=== Round 2 ===
The winners of round one went through to face members of the top 16 in the second round between 13 and 14 February. In this round Selby took just over an hour to defeat Matthew Stevens 5–1 with a 98% potting success rate and breaks of 65, 64, 133, 80 and 68. Afterwards, Stevens said he was angry with the WPBSA because he had been refused dispensation to remove his bow tie as he was ill with flu, which affected his vision and balance. Lee leveled 2–2 with Bond but the latter won three successive frames with a break of 68 to claim a 5–2 victory. Stephen Maguire achieved breaks of 121, 83 and 111 en route to whitewashing his compatriot McManus 5–0 in a match that ran for just over 90 minutes. John Higgins, the 2000 Welsh Open champion, was defeated 5–3 by the unranked Higginson. Trailing 3–0 Higginson took advantage of an error from Higgins to achieve successive breaks of 68, 50, 60 and 121 and won the match in the eighth frame following a fluked green ball and putting Higgins in a snookered position behind the brown ball.

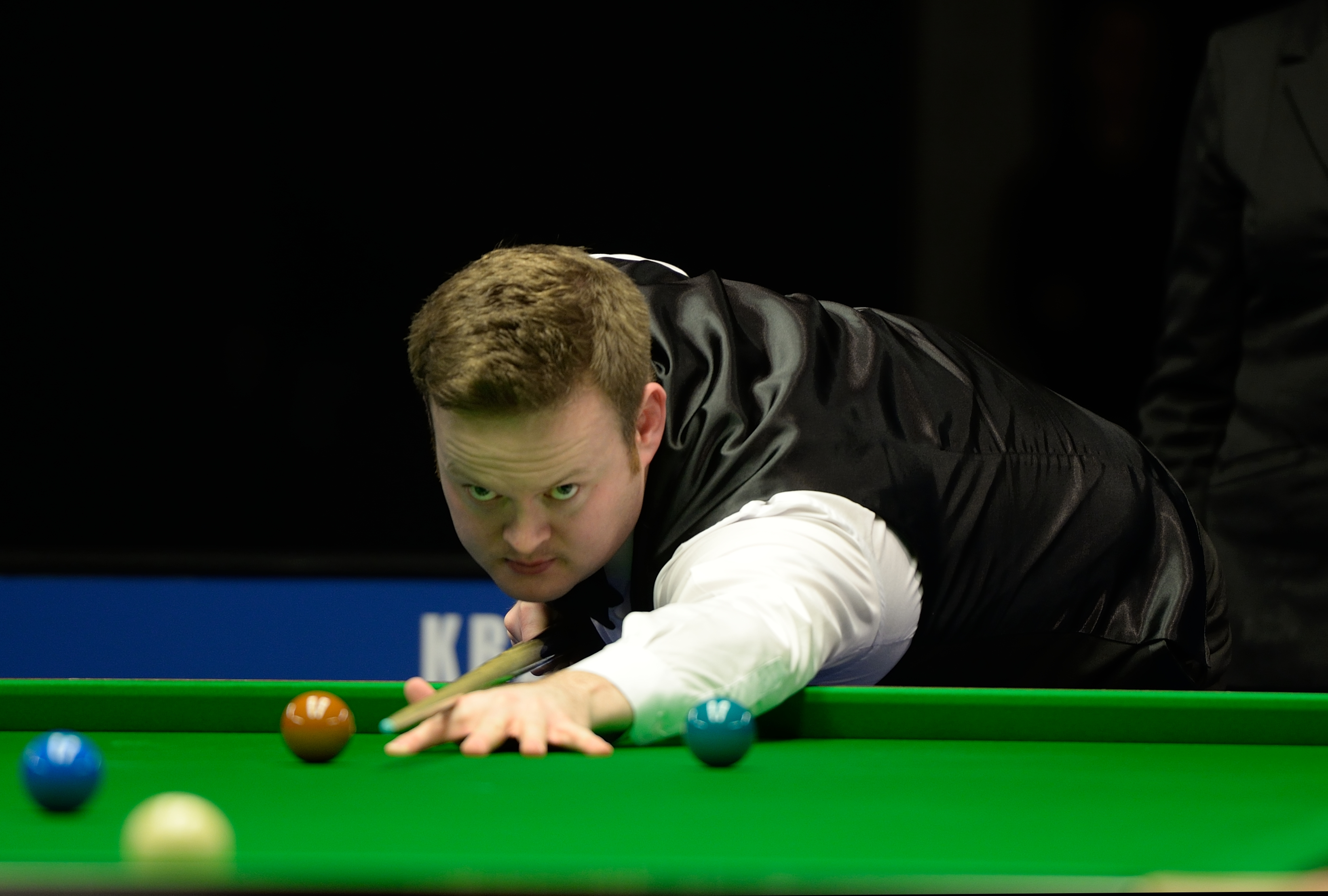
Shaun Murphy (pictured in 2015) was the first player to compile four century breaks in a row during a best-of-nine frames match in the second round of the Welsh Open.

The 2006 Malta Cup champion Ken Doherty took a 5–3 win over Swail from breaks of 49, 79, 116, 47 and 84 with Swail producing two breaks of 87 and a 65 to prevent his opponent from claiming an easy victory. Neil Robertson claimed a 5–2 victory against Holt. O'Sullivan began at 1–1 against McCulloch until he made a clearance in the third frame after McCulloch missed a ball while 49–43 ahead. Breaks of 109 and 53 and a 64 clearance on the black ball gave O'Sullivan a 5–3 win, after which he said his playing technique needed improving. World number 7 Peter Ebdon lost 4–5 to Harold, who came from 4–1 down to take the match to a final frame decider that lasted 38 minutes and ended when Ebdon hit a difficult pink ball instead of the brown ball and conceded. Anthony Hamilton ended a ten match and ten-month losing streak with a 5–4 victory over Perry. Coming from 3–1 behind at the mid-session interval Hamilton rallied to tie the match at 3–3 until Perry won the eighth frame on the pink ball. Hamilton won the final frame decider with a break of 119.

Stephen Hendry, a three-time Welsh Open champion, missed a frame winning opportunity at 4–0, allowing his opponent Woollaston to produce a 51 clearance in frame five and a break of 61 in the sixth. But Hendry recovered with a break of 127 in frame seven to win 5–2. Murphy took 72 minutes to whitewash Cope 5–0 and outscored him 556–32 in a game which saw Murphy become the first player in the history of snooker to produce four consecutive century breaks (a 135 clearance and runs of 123, 102 and 101) in a best-of-nine frames match and the second time it had been achieved in a major ranking tournament. Dott compiled a match-winning break of 114 for a 5–3 victory against Greene and the six-time world champion Steve Davis whitewashed Gilbert 5–0. Judge won 5–2 over number 12 seed Barry Hawkins with a game-winning break of 79 to extend Hawkins' record of not winning while in the top 16 rankings and the two-time world champion Mark Williams lost 4–5 to Burnett despite recovering from 4–2 down. The final second round match saw Ali Carter defeat Bingham 5–3.

=== Round 3 ===
In the third round held on 15 February, O'Sullivan won 5–1 against Selby. He took the first frame by potting the pink ball, made a break of 70 in the second and won the third before Selby compiled a 100 break for a 3–1 score at the mid-session interval. A break of 80 in frame five and a sixth frame win earned O'Sullivan the victory. Hamilton overcame Harold 5–3 with a break of 120 to win his second game of the season in a match that lasted almost 3 hours and 20 minutes. Davis reached the 84th quarter-final of his career in a world ranking competition by defeating Dott 5–3. He built a 3–1 advantage with breaks of 82, 69 and 76 that Dott reduced by taking two successive frames. Dott missed a yellow ball shot to a baulk pocket in frame eight and Davis won the match with a clearance to the pink ball. Murphy prevailed 5–4 in a 3-hour and 48-minute match against Burnett. After trailing 2–0 and 4–2, Burnett recovered to force a final frame decider with a break of 104 in frame seven and he claimed the eighth on the blue ball after Murphy missed an easy brown ball shot. Murphy won frame nine unchallenged.

In his match against Hendry, Robertson took a 4–0 lead, a period in which Hendry did not pot a single ball in 39 minutes and Robertson achieved a 141 total clearance. Hendry responded to win three successive frames as he accumulated 255 points without reply from breaks of 64, 96 and 83. However, Robertson won the match 5–3 in frame eight with a run of 51. Robertson said after the match, "This is first time since then I've had that really hungry attitude back", and Hendry praised his opponent for his performance during the eighth frame. Doherty made breaks of 99 and 111 to tie 3–3 with Maguire but the latter drew clear to claim a 5–3 victory, his first win against Doherty in three attempts. Higginson reached the first quarter-final of his career with a 5–1 win over Judge, while Carter recovered from 3–0 down to narrowly defeat Bond 5–4.

=== Quarter-finals ===
In the quarter-finals held on 16 February, Higginson achieved a maximum break in the second frame of his 5–1 victory over Ali Carter. It was the first maximum break of his career, the third in the history of the Welsh Open and the 56th in professional competition. Frames three and four were won by Higginson with breaks of 83 and 48 and accrued 342 points without reply. Carter prevented a whitewash with a break of 54 in frame five but Higginson won the match with a break of 104.

Robertson won 5–4 against O'Sullivan in a closely contested match. Robertson went 2–0 up with breaks of 135 and 45, which O'Sullivan tied with breaks of 69 and 122 in the following two frames. O'Sullivan compiled a 109 break in frame five as he accumulated 322 unanswered points but Robertson had a reprieve when a button on O'Sullivan's waistcoat made contact with the yellow ball and won frame six. O'Sullivan won a fragmented seventh frame and Robertson took the match to a final frame decider with a century break of 124. Robertston won the match with a clearance and a 74–45 scoreline after O'Sullivan missed a straightforward red ball shot.

Davis overcame Hamilton by the same scoreline to enter the 58th semi-final of a ranking tournament in his career. Coming from 3–0 and 4–3 behind Davis achieved a break of 61 after Hamilton (leading 46–0) grazed the black ball while attempting to pot a red ball in frame eight. Davis took advantage of three errors from Hamilton to complete the match and claim victory with a clearance from the green to pink balls in the final frame decider. Maguire twice came from a frame behind in his match against Murphy before gaining the lead in the fifth frame. He was able to maintain his advantage to win 5–3 and complete the semi-final lineup.

=== Semi-finals ===
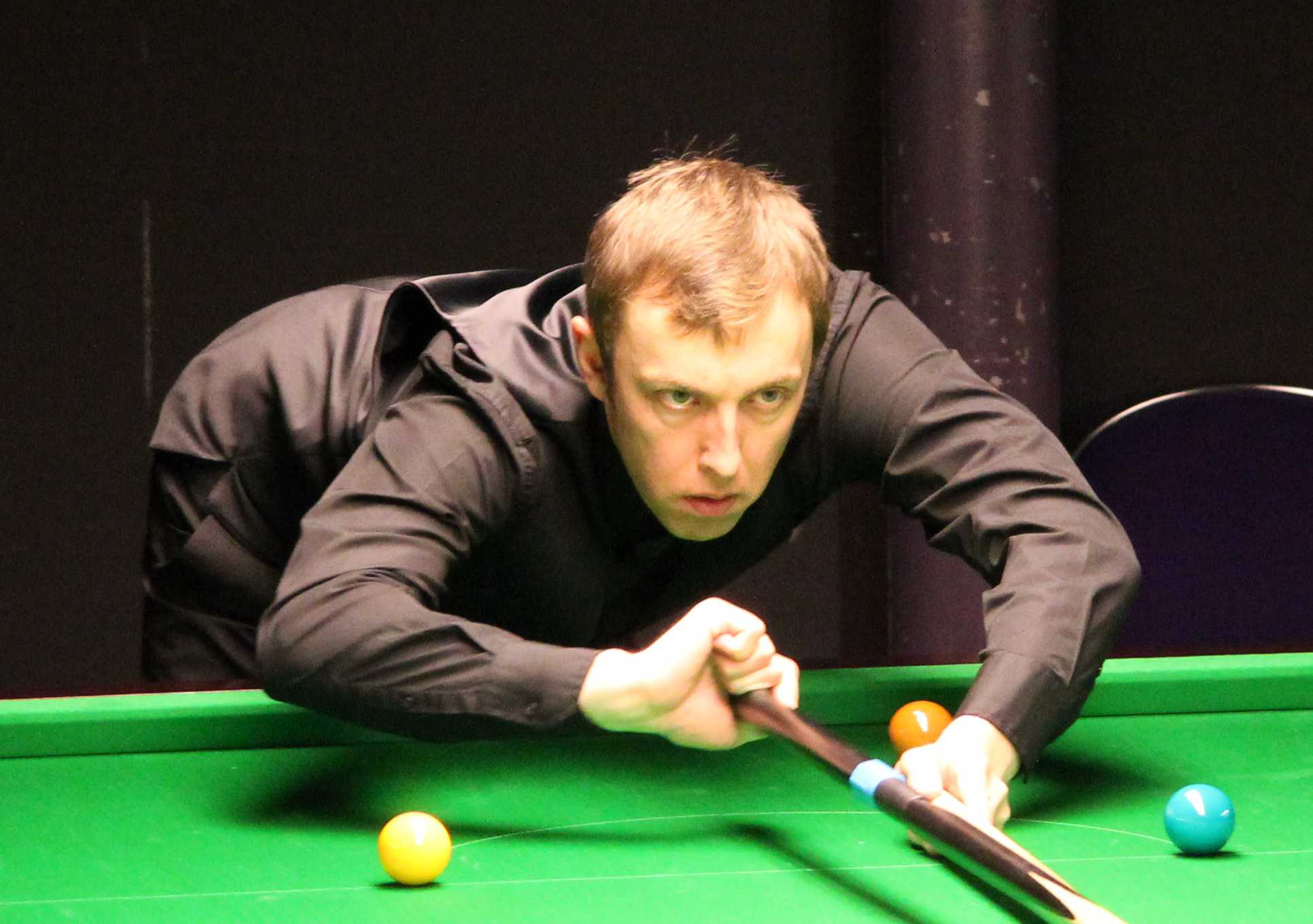
Andrew Higginson (pictured in 2011) became the first unranked player to enter the final of ranking tournament since Terry Griffiths in 1979.

The semi-final matches held on 17 February were increased to the best-of-11 frames. Robertson won 6–3 against Davis and was the first player to enter the final. Davis won the opening frame, with Robertson responding with a runs of 42 and 41 in the second after Davis missed a red ball shot. Robertson drew clear to lead 4–1 with breaks of 70, 109 and 79. Frame six was taken by Davis who came from 51–0 behind to compile a 54 clearance but lost a disjointed seventh frame to Robertson . Davis won frame eight with a break of 91 but Robertson completed the match in the ninth frame. After the match, Robertson spoke of his run into the final that saw him defeat three world champions, "They've won lots of times at the Crucible and countless other tournaments as well so you could say it's been a big week for me, scalping wise. But it'll all count for nothing if I don't keep my focus in the final." Davis bemoaned missing a straightforward red ball in the second frame, "When you do that Neil scores a lot of points. If your safety doesn't work against him there's damage done."

The other semi-final game saw Higginson become the first unranked player to enter the final of a ranking tournament since Terry Griffiths in the 1979 World Snooker Championship with his defeat over Maguire by the same scoreline. Both players shared the opening four frames of the match to level the score at 2–2. Higginson opened a two-frame lead with breaks of 66 and 94 in frames six and seven and a further break of 64 in the eighth after Maguire overran his intended position on the black ball while on a run of 48. Maguire delayed Higginson's win in frame eight but the latter compiled runs of 53 and 57 to take the victory in the ninth frame. Afterwards, Higginson called it "a dream, totally surreal" and said he would benefit from the ranking points, prize money and the additional experience, "This is unbelievable. Before the start I was very nervous because I suddenly realised that I'd got a great chance to do something that was beyond my wildest dreams."

=== Final ===
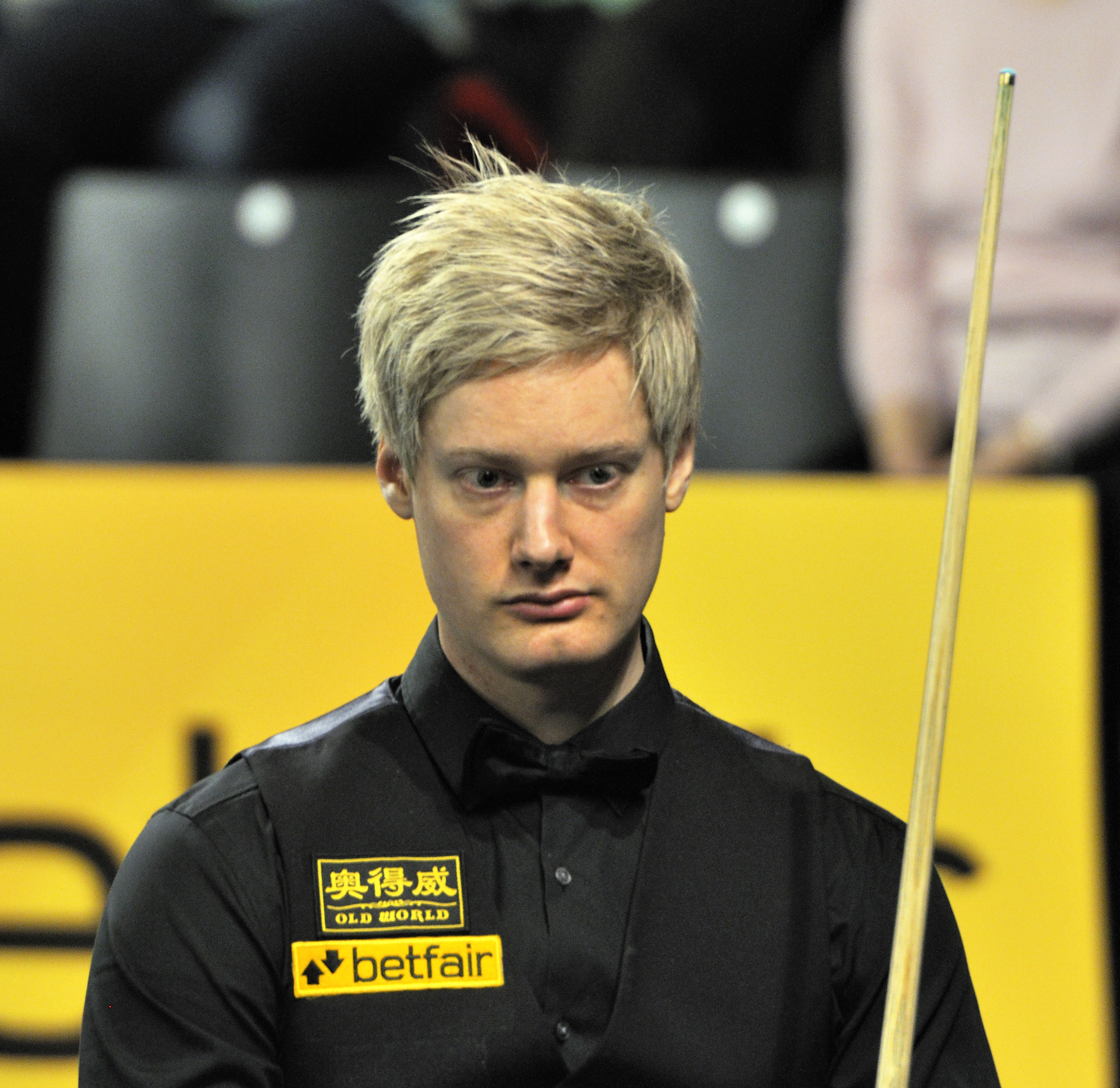
Neil Robertson (pictured in 2013) won the tournament 9–8 to become the fourth non-British and Irish player in history to win two or more ranking tournaments.

The best-of-17 frames final on 18 February was played against Robertson and Higginson. It was refereed by Michaela Tabb, who became the first woman in history to take charge of a ranking snooker event final. The pre-final favourite to win the tournament was Robertson, while his opponent Higginson was a 500–1 outsider in his third appearance in the main stages of a professional competition.

Robertson won the first five of the six frames with breaks of 98, 76 and 71 as Higginson compiled a break of 114 in the second frame. Although Higginson clinched the seventh frame, Robertson produced a break of 74 in the eighth to conclude the first session 6–2 up. In the second session the first six frames were won by Higginson from breaks of 54, 100, 97, 64 and 81 en route to a 8–6 lead and outscored Robertson 425–49. This left Higginson within a solitary frame of winning the first ranking tournament of his career. However, Robertson compiled a clearance of 92, and breaks of 32 and 59 in frame fifteen to force the match to a final frame decider. Robertson maintained his composure to win the tournament and the match after Higginson missed a plant at the start of the last frame.

After the match, Robertson praised Higginson's performance and said he had to remain patient and believe in himself despite feeling anxious, "It was just a matter of getting a chance and thankfully I got it." Higginson said he was not disappointed to lose the tournament and revealed he entered the tournament without any anticipation since he was the underdog in most of his matches, "I needed to win one more match to take the title and if someone had told me this would happen a week ago, I would have sent them for a drugs test. Getting this far is a dream come true.''

It was Robertson's second ranking tournament win of the season after the Grand Prix in October 2006. He joined Cliff Thorburn, James Wattana and Ding Junhui as the fourth non-British or Irish player in history to win more than one career ranking competition. The victory earned Robertson £35,000; he moved to seventh in the provisional world rankings while Higginson rose to 40th. The event, according to Phil Yates of The Times, would be remembered for Higginson's performance and praised him for "greatly enhancing the tournament by so nearly defying ante-post odds of 500–1."

== Prize fund ==
The breakdown of prize money for this year is shown below:

- Winner: £35,000
- Runner Up: £17,500
- Semi Finalists: £8,750
- Quarter Finalist: £6,500
- Last 16: £4,275
- Last 32: £2,750
- Last 48: £1,725
- Last 64: £1,325
- Stage one highest break: £500
- Stage two highest break: £2,000
- Stage one maximum break: £1,000
- Stage two maximum break: £20,000
- Total: £225,500

== Main draw ==
Numbers to the left of the players' names are the tournament seedings. Players in bold indicate match winners.

Last 48; Best of 9 frames
20	**Nigel Bond** (ENG)	**5**
Liang Wenbo (CHN)	3
24	**Stuart Bingham** (ENG)	**5**
63	Joe Delaney (IRL)	0
17	Ryan Day (WAL)	0
43	**Michael Judge** (IRL)	**5**
22	Marco Fu (HKG)	2
**Andrew Higginson** (ENG)	**5**
27	Ding Junhui (CHN)	1
47	**Jamie Cope** (ENG)	**5**
32	Robert Milkins (ENG)	3
54	**Jamie Burnett** (SCO)	**5**
19	**Alan McManus** (SCO)	**5**
46	Rod Lawler (ENG)	2
30	**Joe Swail** (NIR)	**5**
40	Adrian Gunnell (ENG)	1
23	David Gray (ENG)	3
**Ben Woollaston** (ENG)	**5**
21	**Michael Holt** (ENG)	**5**
36	Ricky Walden (ENG)	4
28	**Mark Selby** (ENG)	**5**
Ian Preece (WAL)	0
26	**Ian McCulloch** (ENG)	**5**
61	Mark Allen (NIR)	4
31	Andy Hicks (ENG)	4
35	**Dave Harold** (ENG)	**5**
18	**Joe Perry** (ENG)	**5**
42	John Parrott (ENG)	2
25	James Wattana (THA)	1
**David Gilbert** (ENG)	**5**
29	Mark King (ENG)	0
38	**Gerard Greene** (NIR)	**5**

Last 32; Best of 9 frames
1	Stephen Lee (ENG)	2
20	**Nigel Bond** (ENG)	**5**
15	**Ali Carter** (ENG)	**5**
24	Stuart Bingham (ENG)	3
12	Barry Hawkins (ENG)	2
43	**Michael Judge** (IRL)	**5**
6	John Higgins (SCO)	3
**Andrew Higginson** (ENG)	**5**
7	**Shaun Murphy** (ENG)	**5**
47	Jamie Cope (ENG)	0
9	Mark Williams (WAL)	4
54	**Jamie Burnett** (SCO)	**5**
10	**Stephen Maguire** (SCO)	**5**
19	Alan McManus (SCO)	0
4	**Ken Doherty** (IRL)	**5**
30	Joe Swail (NIR)	3
3	**Stephen Hendry** (SCO)	**5**
Ben Woollaston (ENG)	2
13	**Neil Robertson** (AUS)	**5**
21	Michael Holt (ENG)	2
14	Matthew Stevens (WAL)	1
28	**Mark Selby** (ENG)	**5**
5	**Ronnie O'Sullivan** (ENG)	**5**
26	Ian McCulloch (ENG)	1
8	Peter Ebdon (ENG)	4
35	**Dave Harold** (ENG)	**5**
16	**Anthony Hamilton** (ENG)	**5**
18	Joe Perry (ENG)	4
11	**Steve Davis** (ENG)	**5**
David Gilbert (ENG)	0
2	**Graeme Dott** (SCO)	**5**
38	Gerard Greene (NIR)	3

Last 16; Best of 9 frames
20	Nigel Bond (ENG)	4
15	**Ali Carter** (ENG)	**5**
43	Michael Judge (IRL)	1
**Andrew Higginson** (ENG)	**5**
7	**Shaun Murphy** (ENG)	**5**
54	Jamie Burnett (SCO)	4
10	**Stephen Maguire** (SCO)	**5**
4	Ken Doherty (IRL)	3
3	Stephen Hendry (SCO)	3
13	**Neil Robertson** (AUS)	**5**
28	Mark Selby (ENG)	1
5	**Ronnie O'Sullivan** (ENG)	**5**
35	Dave Harold (ENG)	3
16	**Anthony Hamilton** (ENG)	**5**
11	**Steve Davis** (ENG)	**5**
2	Graeme Dott (SCO)	3

Quarter-finals; Best of 9 frames
15	Ali Carter (ENG)	1
**Andrew Higginson** (ENG)	**5**
7	Shaun Murphy (ENG)	3
10	**Stephen Maguire** (SCO)	**5**
13	**Neil Robertson** (AUS)	**5**
5	Ronnie O'Sullivan (ENG)	4
16	Anthony Hamilton (ENG)	4
11	**Steve Davis** (ENG)	**5**

Semi-finals; Best of 11 frames
**Andrew Higginson** (ENG)	**6**
10	Stephen Maguire (SCO)	3
13	**Neil Robertson** (AUS)	**6**
11	Steve Davis (ENG)	3

Final; Best of 17 frames
Andrew Higginson (ENG)	8
13	**Neil Robertson** (AUS)	**9**

=== Final ===
Scores in bold denote winning frame scores and the winning player. Breaks over 50 are displayed in brackets.

Final: Best of 17 frames. Referee: Michaela Tabb. Newport Centre, Newport, Wales, 18 February 2007.
Andrew Higginson; England	8–**9**	**Neil Robertson** (13); Australia
Afternoon: 0–**77** (76), **114**–1 (114), 19–**117** (71), 47–**67**, 46–**78**, 25–**98** (98), **67**–8, 0–**74** (74); Evening: **98**–0 (54), **100**–1 (100), **97**–0 (97), **65**–9, **80**–0 (64), **85**–39 (81), 2–**124** (92), 5–**98** (59), 0–**70**
**114**	Highest break	98
**2**	Century breaks	0
6	50+ breaks	6

== Qualifying ==
Qualifying for the tournament took place between 6 and 8 January 2007 at Pontins in Prestatyn, Wales. Players in bold denote match winners.

Round 1 Best of 9 frames
**Liang Wenbo** (CHN)	**5**
Dene O'Kane (NZL)	0
**Lee Spick** (ENG)	**5**
Patrick Einsle (GER)	1
Chris Melling (ENG)	1
**Jamie Jones** (WAL)	**5**
**Andrew Higginson** (ENG)	**5**
Passakorn Suwannawat (THA)	3
**Mark Joyce** (ENG)	**5**
Mohammed Shehab (UAE)	3
**Liu Song** (CHN)	**5**
Jeff Cundy (ENG)	2
Chris Norbury (ENG)	4
**Sean Storey** (ENG)	**5**
Matthew Couch (ENG)	2
**Alex Borg** (MLT)	**5**
Paul Davison (ENG)	4
**Ben Woollaston** (ENG)	**5**
Tian Pengfei (CHN)	4
**Robert Stephen** (SCO)	**5**
**Ian Preece** (WAL)	**5**
Peter Lines (ENG)	0
Paul Wykes (ENG)	2
**Issara Kachaiwong** (THA)	**5**
Lee Page (ENG)	4
**David Morris** (IRL)	**5**
**Judd Trump** (ENG)	**5**
Mark Boyle (SCO)	2
Alfie Burden (ENG)	3
**James Leadbetter** (ENG)	**5**
Roy Stolk (NLD)	1
**Dermot McGlinchey** (NIR)	**5**

Round 2 Best of 9 frames
Joe Jogia (ENG)	2
**Liang Wenbo** (CHN)	**5**
**Joe Delaney** (IRL)	**5**
Lee Spick (ENG)	3
**Tony Drago** (MLT)	**5**
Jamie Jones (WAL)	2
Scott MacKenzie (SCO)	1
**Andrew Higginson** (ENG)	**5**
**Mike Dunn** (ENG)	**5**
Mark Joyce (ENG)	1
**Jamie Burnett** (SCO)	**5**
Liu Song (CHN)	3
**Andrew Norman** (ENG)	**5**
Sean Storey (ENG)	1
Paul Davies (WAL)	4
**Alex Borg** (MLT)	**5**
Shokat Ali (PAK)	3
**Ben Woollaston** (ENG)	**5**
**Stuart Pettman** (ENG)	**5**
Robert Stephen (SCO)	2
Robin Hull (FIN)	2
**Ian Preece** (WAL)	**5**
**Mark Allen** (NIR)	**5**
Issara Kachaiwong (THA)	1
David Roe (ENG)	1
**David Morris** (IRL)	**5**
**Jimmy Michie** (ENG)	**5**
Judd Trump (ENG)	2
**David Gilbert** (ENG)	**5**
James Leadbetter (ENG)	2
**Rory McLeod** (ENG)	**5**
Dermot McGlinchey (NIR)	4

Round 3 Best of 9 frames
Mark Davis (ENG)	4
**Liang Wenbo** (CHN)	**5**
Marcus Campbell (SCO)	4
**Joe Delaney** (IRL)	**5**
**Michael Judge** (IRL)	**5**
Tony Drago (MLT)	2
Drew Henry (SCO)	0
**Andrew Higginson** (ENG)	**5**
**Jamie Cope** (ENG)	**5**
Mike Dunn (ENG)	0
Dominic Dale (WAL)	4
**Jamie Burnett** (SCO)	**5**
**Rod Lawler** (ENG)	**5**
Andrew Norman (ENG)	3
**Adrian Gunnell** (ENG)	**5**
Alex Borg (MLT)	0
Fergal O'Brien (IRL)	2
**Ben Woollaston** (ENG)	**5**
**Ricky Walden** (ENG)	**5**
Stuart Pettman (ENG)	1
Tom Ford (ENG)	1
**Ian Preece** (WAL)	**5**
Jimmy White (ENG)	4
**Mark Allen** (NIR)	**5**
**Dave Harold** (ENG)	**5**
David Morris (IRL)	3
**John Parrott** (ENG)	**5**
Jimmy Michie (ENG)	4
Barry Pinches (ENG)	4
**David Gilbert** (ENG)	**5**
**Gerard Greene** (NIR)	**5**
Rory McLeod (ENG)	3

== Century breaks ==
A total of 31 century breaks were made by 22 different participants during the qualifying rounds of the tournament.

=== Qualifying stage centuries ===
- 139, 110, 107 – Ricky Walden
- 136 – Lee Spick
- 134, 126 – Ian Preece
- 132 – John Parrott
- 131 – Jamie Cope
- 128, 100 – Mark Davis
- 127, 122 – Andrew Higginson
- 127 – Mark Allen
- 122 – Stuart Pettman
- 118 – Rory McLeod
- 115 – Robert Stephen
- 111 – Passakorn Suwannawat
- 111 – Tony Drago
- 110 – Mark Boyle
- 108, 108, 106 – Liang Wenbo
- 107 – David Gilbert
- 105 – Paul Wykes
- 104, 103, 102 – Judd Trump
- 104 – Chris Norbury
- 104 – Joe Jogia
- 100 – Sean Storey
- 100 – Paul Davies

=== Televised stage centuries ===
The main stage of the 2007 Welsh Open saw a total of 45 century breaks compiled by 19 different players.

- 147, 133, 125, 117, 114, 104, 100 Andrew Higginson
- 141, 135, 124, 109 – Neil Robertson
- 139, 134, 119, 115 – Anthony Hamilton
- 137 – Michael Judge
- 136, 115 – Stuart Bingham
- 135, 134, 123, 102, 101 – Shaun Murphy
- 133 – Mark Selby
- 131, 115, 104 – Michael Holt
- 130 – Dave Harold
- 128 – Stephen Hendry
- 127, 110 – Joe Perry
- 122, 109, 109, 100 – Ronnie O'Sullivan
- 121, 111, 104 – Stephen Maguire
- 116, 111 – Ken Doherty
- 114 – Graeme Dott
- 113 – Alan McManus
- 110 – Jamie Cope
- 104 – Jamie Burnett
- 102 – Gerard Greene
