= Michael White (snooker player) =

Welsh snooker player (born 1991)

Michael J White
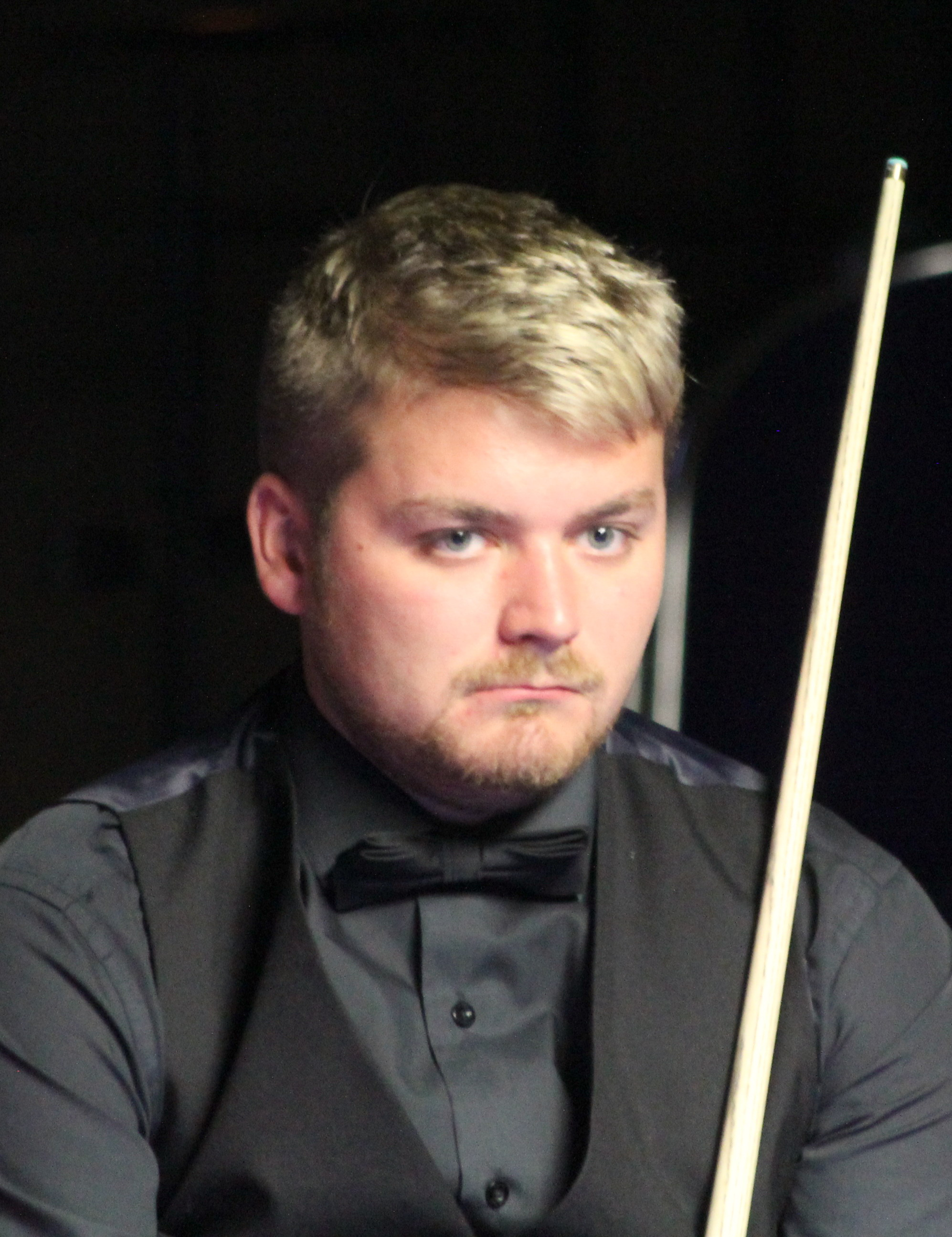
- White at the 2016 Paul Hunter Classic

Personal information
- Born: 5 July 1991 (age 35) Neath, Glamorgan, Wales

Sport
- Country: Wales
- Sport: Snooker
- Professional: 2007/2008, 2009–2020, 2022–2024
- Highest ranking: 15 (April 2016)

Tournament wins
- Ranking: 2

Michael White (born 5 July 1991) is a Welsh former professional snooker player from Neath, Glamorgan. Nicknamed 'Lightning' due to his fast playing style, he won two ranking titles during his career.

White holds the Guinness World Record as the youngest player to compile a witnessed century break, a feat he accomplished in March 2001 when he was aged 9 years and 268 days. He won the World Amateur Championship in 2006, aged 14, and turned professional during the 2007–08 snooker season. He won his first ranking title at the 2015 Indian Open and his second at the 2017 Paul Hunter Classic. He reached his career highest world ranking of 15th in April 2016.

White's form declined in the 2018–19 season, and he dropped off the professional tour after ending the 2019–20 season outside the top 64 in the world rankings. He regained his tour card by qualifying for the main stage of the 2022 World Snooker Championship at the Crucible Theatre, becoming only the second amateur player (after James Cahill in 2019) to do so.

In July 2024, White was sentenced at Swansea Crown Court to a total of 3 years in prison, relating to two charges of assault occasioning actual bodily harm on his former partner. The World Professional Billiards and Snooker Association revoked White's WPBSA membership with immediate effect, which removed him from the professional tour and the snooker world rankings.

== Career ==
=== Early career ===
White first showed potential by becoming the youngest player to make a witnessed century break: a 105 in March 2001, when aged nine. In 2001, he was invited to the Crucible, where John Parrott commented: 'I hope I've retired before I have to play him!' He won a number of junior and later amateur events, and in 2006 became the youngest ever winner of the IBSF World Grand Prix, winning it aged 14. He also won the European under-19 Championship, beating Vincent Muldoon in the final. He turned professional for the 2007–08 season, but he was not allowed to play in the first ranking event of the season, the 2007 Shanghai Masters as it fell short of his 16th birthday which allowed his opponent Lee Walker a walkover. Previously Shaun Murphy had been allowed to play aged 15.

=== Turning professional ===
In his first professional match, the Masters qualifying, he shocked Leicester player Tom Ford 4–0, however he lost to eventual champion Barry Hawkins 5–2 in the following round. His first season on the Main Tour was relatively unsuccessful, winning only four matches in the seven ranking events. In his first ranking tournament, the Grand Prix, he finished last in his group, beating Tony Drago but losing his other 6 matches. His most successful run was beating Shailesh Jogia 10–4 in the first round of the World Championship qualifiers, but he lost 10–4 to Barry Pinches in the next. These results meant that he dropped off the Main Tour.

He regained a place on the Main Tour for the 2009–10 Season by finishing top of the Welsh rankings.

In the qualifiers for the 2009 Shanghai Masters he beat former world champion John Parrott 5–0 (who later joked "I hope I retire before I have to play him...again" in reference to his earlier comment) before losing 5–3 to Mark Davis. His best run during the season was to the last 48 of the UK Championship, with victories over Daniel Wells, Jin Long and Jamie Burnett before losing 9–4 to Liang Wenbo. This meant that by the end of the season he had done enough to retain his tour status.

=== 2010/2011 season ===
He started the new season by winning three qualifying matches in the 2010 Shanghai Masters, including a 5–1 win over Dominic Dale, before losing to Peter Ebdon by the same scoreline. He won two matches, before losing in the third qualifying round on two further occasions during the season. At the minor-ranking Euro PTC Event 3 White beat the likes of Tom Ford and Marco Fu to reach the quarter-finals, where he lost 2–4 to Andrew Higginson. He went on to finish 51st on the PTC Order of Merit and 71st in the world rankings.

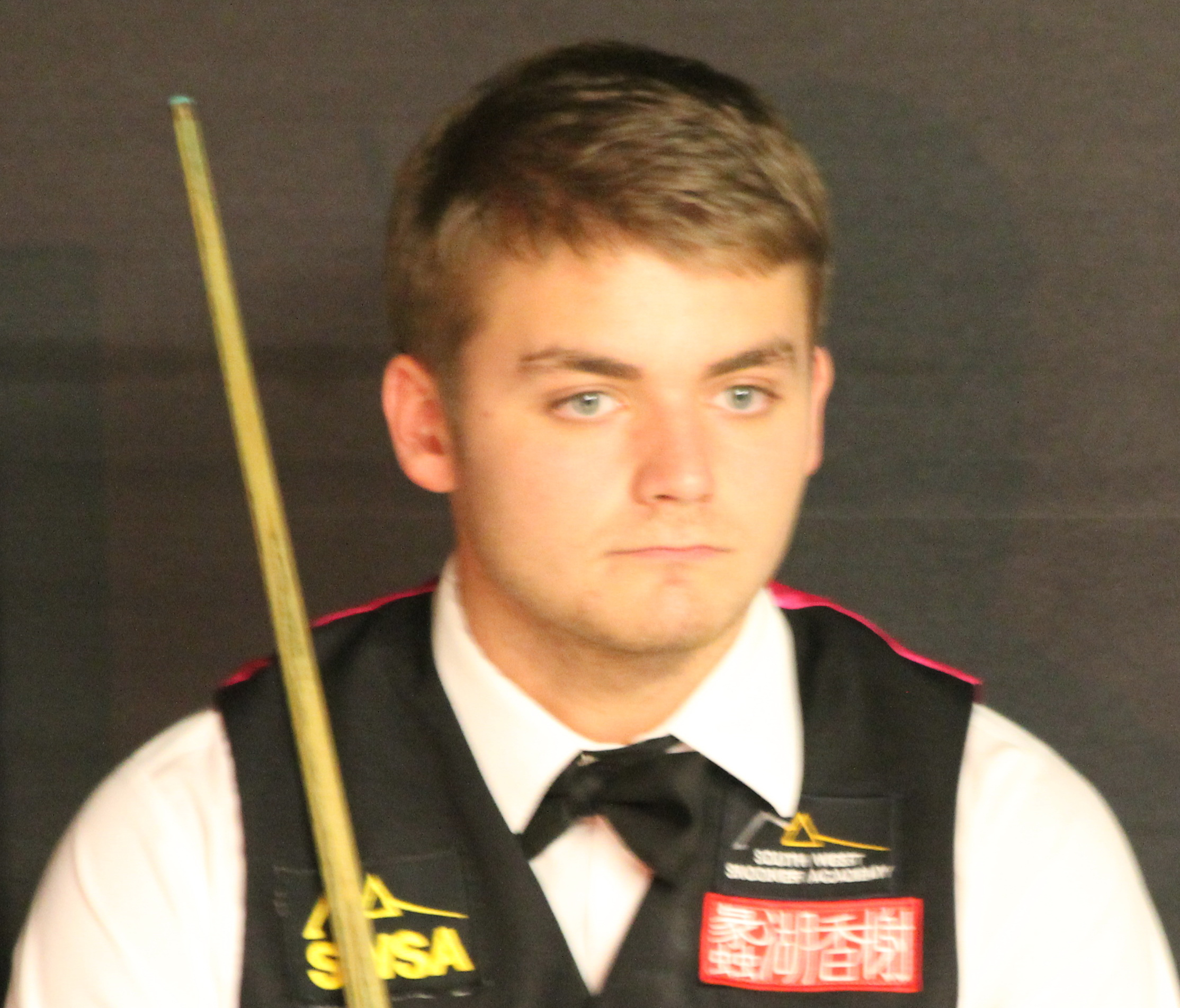
Michael White at the 2012 Paul Hunter Classic

=== 2011/2012 season ===
White narrowly missed out on a place in the 2012 Players Tour Championship Finals as he finished 25th on the Order of Merit, with only 24 players qualifying for the event. His placing was largely thanks to a semi-final run in Event 7, where his hopes of a first professional title were ended by Ronnie O'Sullivan, who won 4–2. Even though he could not qualify for a ranking event throughout the season he ended it at a then career high world ranking of 54, meaning he had risen 12 places during the year.

=== 2012/2013 season ===
White began the 2012–13 season by winning three matches to qualify for the Wuxi Classic and two matches to qualify for the International Championship but lost in the wildcard once at the venues in China in both, to Zhou Yuelong 4–5 and Lü Haotian 5–6 respectively. White beat Craig Steadman and Ken Doherty to qualify for the UK Championship, the first time he had made it into the first round of a ranking event. In his first domestic televised match in a ranking event, White played world number two Mark Selby and recovered from 0–2 down to level at 3–3 before succumbing to a 3–6 defeat, with White stating afterwards that he would definitely be back for more. He kept true to his word by beating Zhang Anda 10–5 and Andrew Higginson 10–4 (he trailed 1–3 but won nine of the next ten frames) to qualify for the first round of the biggest tournament in snooker, the World Championship. He beat compatriot and two-time winner of the event Mark Williams in the opening round 10–6, with Williams admitting he had been outplayed in every department of the game. He beat fellow qualifier Dechawat Poomjaeng 13–3 in the last 16 and faced Ricky Walden in his first ranking event quarter-final, losing 6–13. White increased his ranking to world number 34, a climb of 20 spots during the season which was the most of any player on tour.

=== 2013/2014 season ===
White had an extremely consistent 2013–14 season as he played in the first round of 10 of the 12 ranking events. In the inaugural Indian Open he beat Zhang Anda and Gary Wilson to reach his second career quarter-final. He lost the last three frames against Stephen Maguire to be defeated 4–3. White reached the second round in four more ranking events during the rest of the season but was beaten on each occasion. At the World Championship, White was a qualifier and faced world number three (and eventual champion) Mark Selby in the first round. White recovered from 5–1, 8–4, and 9–8 behind to take the match to a deciding 19th frame, which he lost. He finished inside the top 32 in the rankings for the first time in his career as the world number 27.

=== 2014/2015 season ===
Ever since I first played snooker at the age of seven, I have dreamed of winning tournaments. It means everything to me, I can't describe how I'm feeling. Since I was nine, people have been on my back to win titles, although the only pressure I feel is what I put on myself. I just want to keep improving now.

— White on winning his first ranking title at the Indian Open.

In the first round of the Shanghai Masters, White came from 3–0 down against Neil Robertson to win 5–4 and went on to defeat Ryan Day 5–2 to make the quarter-finals. White made another comeback to force a deciding frame this time from 4–1 behind, but Mark Allen won it. Another quarter-final followed at the International Championship where Allen was again the victor as he won 6–3, after White had been 3–1 up.

In March 2015, White had a phenomenal run of form. He won his first professional title at the Shoot-Out, the tournament where each match is decided by one 10-minute frame, White won the title by taking the lead in the final against Xiao Guodong with six seconds remaining. He then won the Indian Open after reaching the semi-finals of a ranking event for the first time in his fifth attempt by beating Chris Wakelin 4–2. White then defeated Mark Williams 4–2 and saved his best performance of the week for the final against Ricky Walden where he scored a total of 419 points to Walden's 27 in claiming his first ranking title with a 5–0 win. His prize money for winning back-to-back tournaments stood at £82,000. White made his debut in the PTC Grand Final and lost 4–3 to Martin Gould in the first round. A pair of deciding frame victories over Ken Doherty and Stuart Bingham helped him to the last 16 of the China Open, but he was eliminated 5–1 by Robert Milkins. White's season ended with a 10–5 defeat to Craig Steadman in the second round of the World Championship qualifying. His year was reflected in the rankings as he rose 10 places to end it 17th in the world.

=== 2015/2016 season ===
White reached the quarter-finals of the Australian Goldfields Open, the first ranking event of the season and played former schoolmate Jamie Jones. The match went to a decider after White had been 4–2 up and he made a 56 in it, before Jones cleared with 66 to win 5–4. His ranking title gave him entry into the Champion of Champions, where he lost 4–2 to Joe Perry in the first round and he suffered an opening round 6–5 loss to Sydney Wilson, a player ranked more than 100 places lower than White, at the UK Championship. However, at the Gibraltar Open he whitewashed reigning world champion Stuart Bingham to reach his first European Tour final, but was defeated 4–1 by Marco Fu. White played in his first Welsh Open quarter-final after knocking out John Higgins 4–1 and lost it 5–0 to Mark Allen. After White lost 10–7 to Sam Baird in the first round of the World Championship he revealed that he has depression and the stress of playing professional snooker can exacerbate it.

=== 2016/2017 season ===
White lost 4–2 in the fourth round of the Paul Hunter Classic to Jimmy White. A 5–4 re-spotted black win over Jimmy Robertson qualified him for the Shanghai Masters and he beat Ricky Walden 5–4 and Judd Trump 5–3, before losing 5–1 to Stephen Maguire in the quarter-finals. A second quarter-final came at the Northern Ireland Open and White was ousted 5–2 by Barry Hawkins. White lost 6–4 to compatriot Matthew Stevens in the second round of the UK Championship. He recorded a 4–3 win over John Higgins at the World Grand Prix, before being defeated 4–2 by Ryan Day in the second round. White hit three centuries in his 5–3 first round win over Yu Delu at the China Open and then beat Ali Carter by the same scoreline, but lost 5–1 to Shaun Murphy in the third round. He was heavily defeated 10–3 by Gary Wilson in the final qualifying round for the World Championship.

=== 2017/2018 season ===
White picked up his second ranking title by defeating Shaun Murphy 4–2 in the final of the 2017 Paul Hunter Classic, having previously defeated defending champion Mark Selby 4–1 in the fourth round.

=== 2019/2020 season ===
A "sudden loss of form" this season saw no finals and only one finish better than a second-round loss, that being the UK Championship, where he defeated Mark Selby 4–1 in the fourth round before losing by the same scoreline to Ian Burns in the quarter final. White thus dropped off the pro tour in 2020, which he later credited to personal issues including depression and "a bit of a problem with alcohol".

=== 2021/2022 season ===
White came from 6–7 behind to defeat Jordan Brown 10–8 in the fourth qualifying round of the 2022 World Snooker Championship, becoming only the second amateur to qualify for the Crucible stage, after James Cahill in 2019. He lost 3–10 in the first round to three-time champion Mark Williams, who made four centuries in the match. White nevertheless regained his tour card for the subsequent two seasons.

=== 2024/2025 season ===
White began the season ranked 55, after two strong seasons on the tour. He competed in the first tournament of the season – the 2024 Championship League – and won his stage one match in Group 23 with two wins and a draw, but he lost in the second stage by failing to win any games. This was his only tournament appearance of the season.

=== Imprisonment and removal from professional tour ===
On 11 July 2024, White was sentenced at Swansea Crown Court to a total of three years' imprisonment for two charges of assault occasioning actual bodily harm against his former partner. He received consecutive sentences of 19 months for the first assault, which had taken place on 12 February 2022, and 17 months for the second, which had taken place on 10 December 2022. Shortly after his sentencing, the WPBSA revoked his membership with immediate effect, removing him from the professional World Snooker Tour and from the world rankings.

== Performance and rankings timeline ==
Tournament	2007/ 08	2009/ 10	2010/ 11	2011/ 12	2012/ 13	2013/ 14	2014/ 15	2015/ 16	2016/ 17	2017/ 18	2018/ 19	2019/ 20	2020/ 21	2021/ 22	2022/ 23	2023/ 24
Ranking	(Note: New players on the Main Tour don't have a ranking)		71	66	54	34	27	17	19	26	29	45	(Note: He was an amateur)		(Note: Players qualified One Year Ranking List started the season without ranking points)	66
Ranking tournaments
Championship League	Non-ranking Event												RR	RR	2R	2R
Xi'an Grand Prix	Tournament Not Held															
Saudi Arabia Masters	Tournament Not Held															
English Open	Tournament Not Held								2R	QF	1R	1R	1R	LQ	1R	1R
British Open	Tournament Not Held													1R	LQ	LQ
Wuhan Open	Tournament Not Held															1R
Northern Ireland Open	Tournament Not Held								QF	1R	2R	1R	3R	LQ	3R	1R
International Championship	Tournament Not Held				WR	1R	QF	3R	1R	LQ	LQ	1R	Not Held			1R
UK Championship	LQ	LQ	LQ	LQ	1R	2R	2R	1R	2R	3R	1R	4R	1R	1R	LQ	LQ
Shoot Out	Not Held		Non-Ranking Event						2R	2R	SF	1R	3R	1R	QF	4R
Scottish Open	Tournament Not Held				MR	Not Held			2R	4R	2R	1R	2R	LQ	1R	LQ
German Masters	Not Held		LQ	LQ	LQ	1R	LQ	LQ	1R	LQ	LQ	LQ	1R	LQ	LQ	LQ
Welsh Open	LQ	LQ	LQ	LQ	LQ	2R	3R	QF	3R	1R	1R	1R	1R	3R	LQ	LQ
World Open (Note: The event was called the Grand Prix (2007/2008 and 2009/2010))	LQ	LQ	LQ	LQ	LQ	2R	Not Held		1R	LQ	LQ	LQ	Not Held			1R
World Grand Prix	Tournament Not Held						NR	1R	2R	QF	DNQ	DNQ	DNQ	DNQ	DNQ	DNQ
Players Championship (Note: The event was called the Players Tour Championship Grand Final (2010/2011–2015/2016))	Not Held		DNQ	DNQ	DNQ	DNQ	1R	2R	DNQ	DNQ	DNQ	DNQ	DNQ	DNQ	DNQ	DNQ
Tour Championship	Tournament Not Held										DNQ	DNQ	DNQ	DNQ	DNQ	DNQ
World Championship	LQ	LQ	LQ	LQ	QF	1R	LQ	1R	LQ	LQ	LQ	LQ	LQ	1R	LQ	LQ
Non-ranking tournaments
Champion of Champions	Tournament Not Held					A	A	1R	A	QF	A	A	A	A	A	A
The Masters	LQ	LQ	A	A	A	A	A	A	A	A	A	A	A	A	A	A
Championship League	A	A	A	A	A	A	RR	RR	RR	RR	RR	A	A	A	A	A
Former ranking tournaments
Northern Ireland Trophy	LQ	Tournament Not Held														
Wuxi Classic (Note: The event was called the Jiangsu Classic (2008/2009–2009/2010))	NH	Non-Ranking			WR	1R	2R	Tournament Not Held								
Australian Goldfields Open	Not Held			LQ	LQ	1R	A	QF	Tournament Not Held							
Shanghai Masters	A	LQ	LQ	LQ	LQ	LQ	QF	1R	QF	2R	Non-Ranking		Not Held			NR
Paul Hunter Classic	Pro-am		Minor-Ranking Event						4R	W	3R	NR	Tournament Not Held			
Indian Open	Tournament Not Held					QF	W	NH	LQ	WD	1R	Tournament Not Held				
China Open	LQ	LQ	LQ	LQ	LQ	2R	3R	1R	3R	2R	LQ	Tournament Not Held				
Riga Masters (Note: The event was called the Riga Open (2014/2015–2015/2016))	Tournament Not Held						Minor-Rank		A	1R	2R	LQ	Tournament Not Held			
China Championship	Tournament Not Held								NR	2R	1R	LQ	Tournament Not Held			
WST Pro Series	Tournament Not Held												RR	Tournament Not Held		
Turkish Masters	Tournament Not Held													1R	Not Held	
Gibraltar Open	Tournament Not Held							MR	3R	1R	1R	1R	1R	3R	Not Held	
WST Classic	Tournament Not Held														1R	NH
European Masters (Note: The event was called the Malta Cup (2007/2008))	NR	Tournament Not Held							LQ	LQ	LQ	1R	WD	WD	1R	2R
Former non-ranking tournaments
World Grand Prix	Tournament Not Held						1R	Ranking Event								
General Cup (Note: The event was called the General Cup International (2009/2010–2011/2012))	NH	A	NH	A	A	A	A	SF	Tournament Not Held							
Shoot Out	Not Held		A	1R	3R	2R	W	2R	Ranking Event							
Six-red World Championship (Note: The event was called the Six-red World Grand Prix (2009/2010))	NH	A	A	NH	A	A	2R	3R	3R	RR	RR	A	Not Held		LQ	NH

Performance Table Legend
LQ	lost in the qualifying draw	#R	lost in the early rounds of the tournament (WR = Wildcard round, RR = Round robin)	QF	lost in the quarter-finals
SF	lost in the semi-finals	F	lost in the final	W	won the tournament
DNQ	did not qualify for the tournament	A	did not participate in the tournament	WD	withdrew from the tournament

NH / Not Held	means an event was not held.
NR / Non-Ranking Event	means an event is/was no longer a ranking event.
R / Ranking Event	means an event is/was a ranking event.
MR / Minor-Ranking Event	means an event is/was a minor-ranking event.
PA / Pro-am Event	means an event is/was a pro-am event.

== Career finals ==
=== Ranking finals: 2 (2 titles) ===
Outcome	No.	Year	Championship	Opponent in the final	Score
Winner	1.	2015	Indian Open	(England) Ricky Walden	5–0
Winner	2.	2017	Paul Hunter Classic	(England) Shaun Murphy	4–2

=== Minor-ranking finals: 1 ===
Outcome	No.	Year	Championship	Opponent in the final	Score
Runner-up	1.	2015	Gibraltar Open	(Hong Kong) Marco Fu	1–4

=== Non-ranking finals: 1 (1 title) ===
Outcome	No.	Year	Championship	Opponent in the final	Score
Winner	1.	2015	Snooker Shoot Out	(China) Xiao Guodong	1–0

=== Pro-am finals: 2 (2 titles) ===
Outcome	No.	Year	Championship	Opponent in the final	Score
Winner	1.	2009	Pontins Pro-Am – Event 2	(England) Paul Davison	5–3
Winner	2.	2009	Pontins Pro-Am – Event 4	(Republic of Ireland) Ken Doherty	5–4

=== Amateur finals: 6 (3 titles) ===
Outcome	No.	Year	Championship	Opponent in the final	Score
Runner-up	1.	2005	Welsh Amateur Championship	(Wales) Andrew Pagett	4–6
Winner	1.	2006	IBSF World Grand Prix	(Scotland) Mark Boyle	11–5
Winner	2.	2007	European Under-19 Championships	(Republic of Ireland) Vincent Muldoon	6–2
Runner-up	2.	2008	PIOS – Event 3	(Pakistan) Shokat Ali	3–6
Winner	3.	2009	Welsh Amateur Championship	(Wales) Darren Morgan	8–2
Runner-up	3.	2021	Q Tour – Event 2	(China) Si Jiahui	4–5
