= 2006 IBSF World Grand Prix =

IBSF World Grand Prix
Tournament information
- Dates: 22 February – 6 March 2006
- City: Prestatyn
- Country: Wales
- Organisation: IBSF
- Highest break: (China) Liu Song (127)

Final
- Champion: (Wales) Michael White
- Runner-up: (Scotland) Mark Boyle
- Score: 11–5

The 2006 IBSF World Grand Prix was an amateur snooker tournament that took place from 22 February to 6 March 2006 in Prestatyn, Wales It was the 31st edition of the IBSF World Snooker Championship and also doubled as a qualification event for the World Snooker Tour.

== Summary ==
The 2005 IBSF World Snooker Championship was originally due to be held in Pakistan. However, due to the Kashmir earthquake the tournament was cancelled. As a result, a new tournament was organised to be held in Prestatyn, Wales in 2006 under the name IBSF World Grand Prix so as not to cause confusion between with the 2006 IBSF World Snooker Championship due to be held in Amman, Jordan later that year, with the winner of the World Grand Prix qualifying for the vacant place on World Snooker Tour 2006/07 season.

The tournament was won by 14-year old Michael White who defeated 24th seed Mark Boyle 11–5 in the final, in doing so White became the youngest winner in the tournaments history. Despite being the runner-up Boyle was awarded with World Tour qualification place due to White's age at the time. White would go on to join the World Snooker Tour for the 2007/08 season after winning the European Under-19 Championship. He would cement his reputation as one of the most promising upcoming snooker talents in the world at the time by reaching the top 16 in 2015 and winning his first ranking title at the Indian Open.

== Results ==
Round 1 Best of 9 frames
1	(Wales) David Donovan	5
32	(Scotland) Callum Niven	1
16	(India) Aditya Mehta	5
17	(Wales) Jamie Jones	3
9	(China) Liu Song	4
24	(Scotland) Mark Boyle	5
25	(England) David Grace	3
8	(Wales) Andrew Pagett	5
5	(Wales) Rhydian Richards	3
28	(Malta) Simon Zammit	5
21	(Republic of Ireland) David Hogan	5
12	(Australia) Steve Mifsud	4
13	(Republic of Ireland) Martin McCrudden	5
20	(England) Andy Symons-Rowe	1
29	(England) Daniel Ward	3
4	(Germany) Lasse Münstermann	5
3	(England) Peter Lines	3
30	(Germany) Patrick Einsle	5
19	(Belgium) Kevin Van Hove	2
14	(United Arab Emirates) Mohammed Shehab	5
11	(Thailand) Issara Kachaiwong	4
22	(Wales) Michael White	5
27	(Republic of Ireland) Robert Murphy	5
6	(Thailand) Atthasit Mahitthi	4
7	(Wales) Gavin Pantall	5
26	(Northern Ireland) Julian Logue	4
23	(Wales) Mark Tucker	2
10	(Republic of Ireland) David Morris	5
15	(England) Mark Joyce	1
18	(India) Alok Kumar	4
31	(Taiwan) Po-Hsien Lee	2
2	(India) Pankaj Advani	4

Round 2 Best of 9 frames
1	(Wales) David Donovan	5
16	(India) Aditya Mehta	3
24	(Scotland) Mark Boyle	5
8	(Wales) Andrew Pagett	2
28	(Malta) Simon Zammit	5
21	(Republic of Ireland) David Hogan	4
13	(Republic of Ireland) Martin McCrudden	4
4	(Germany) Lasse Münstermann	5
30	(Germany) Patrick Einsle	0
14	(United Arab Emirates) Mohammed Shehab	5
11	(Wales) Michael White	5
27	(Republic of Ireland) Robert Murphy	2
7	(Wales) Gavin Pantall	5
10	(Republic of Ireland) David Morris	2
18	(India) Alok Kumar	5
2	(India) Pankaj Advani	1

Quarter-Finals; Best of 11 frames
1	(Wales) David Donovan	3
9	(Scotland) Mark Boyle	6
28	(Malta) Simon Zammit	5
4	(Germany) Lasse Münstermann	6
14	(United Arab Emirates) Mohammed Shehab	3
22	(Wales) Michael White	6
7	(Wales) Gavin Pantall	1
18	(India) Alok Kumar	6

Semi-Finals; Best of 15 frames
24	(Scotland) Mark Boyle	8
4	(Germany) Lasse Münstermann	5
22	(Wales) Michael White	8
18	(India) Alok Kumar	5

Final; Best of 21 frames
24	(Scotland) Mark Boyle	5
22	(Wales) Michael White	11
