= 2010 Six-red World Championship =

Six-red World Championship

Tournament information
- Dates: 19–24 July 2010
- Venue: Montien Riverside Hotel
- City: Bangkok
- Country: Thailand
- Organisation: ACBS
- Highest break: 75 (x10)

Final
- Champion: (England) Mark Selby
- Runner-up: (England) Ricky Walden
- Score: 8–6

The 2010 Six-red World Championship (often styled the 2010 SangSom 6-red World Championship for sponsorship and marketing purposes) was a six-red snooker tournament that took place between 19 and 24 July 2010 at the Montien Riverside Hotel in Bangkok, Thailand.

Twenty-eight of the tournament's 48 competitors were currently on the main tour of the more established 15-reds game. A relatively high proportion of competitors were from Asia.

Mark Selby won in the final 8–6 against Ricky Walden.

== Round-robin stage ==
The top four players from each group qualified for the knock-out stage. All matches were best of 9 frames.

=== Group A ===
POS	Player	MP	MW	FW	FL	FD	PTS
1	(England) Jimmy White	5	4	24	11	+13	4
2	(England) Dave Harold	5	4	24	13	+11	4
3	(Wales) Darren Morgan	5	3	20	16	+4	3
4	(Thailand) Noppon Saengkham	5	3	20	19	+1	3
5	(Laos) Sitthidead Sackbiang	5	1	9	23	−14	1
6	(Australia) James Mifsud	5	0	10	25	−15	0

- James Mifsud 4–5 Noppon Saengkham
- Jimmy White 4–5 Dave Harold
- Darren Morgan 5–2 Sitthidead Sackbiang
- Jimmy White 5–2 Noppon Saengkham
- Darren Morgan 5–1 James Mifsud
- Darren Morgan 5–3 Noppon Saengkham
- Jimmy White 5–0 James Mifsud
- Sitthidead Sackbiang 5–3 James Mifsud
- Darren Morgan 2–5 Dave Harold
- Sitthidead Sackbiang 0–5 Dave Harold
- Noppon Saengkham 5–4 Dave Harold
- Jimmy White 5–3 Darren Morgan
- Jimmy White 5–1 Sitthidead Sackbiang
- James Mifsud 2–5 Dave Harold
- Sitthidead Sackbiang 1–5 Noppon Saengkham

=== Group B ===
POS	Player	MP	MW	FW	FL	FD	PTS
1	(Scotland) Scott MacKenzie	5	4	21	15	+6	4
2	(Wales) Mark Williams	5	3	21	14	+7	3
3	(England) Stuart Pettman	5	3	19	15	+4	3
4	(Thailand) Issara Kachaiwong	5	3	19	16	+3	3
5	(Republic of Ireland) Ken Doherty	5	2	17	18	−1	2
6	(Egypt) Hassan Samir	5	0	6	25	−19	0

- Stuart Pettman 5–1 Hassan Samir
- Issara Kachaiwong 5–3 Ken Doherty
- Mark Williams 5–2 Ken Doherty
- Stuart Pettman 5–1 Scott MacKenzie
- Mark Williams 5–1 Issara Kachaiwong
- Hassan Samir 1–5 Issara Kachaiwong
- Mark Williams 3–5 Scott MacKenzie
- Mark Williams 1–5 Hassan Samir
- Scott MacKenzie 5–2 Ken Doherty
- Stuart Pettman 2–5 Issara Kachaiwong
- Mark Williams 3–5 Stuart Pettman
- Scott MacKenzie 5–3 Issara Kachaiwong
- Hassan Samir 1–5 Ken Doherty
- Stuart Pettman 2–5 Ken Doherty
- Hassan Samir 2–5 Scott MacKenzie

=== Group C ===
POS	Player	MP	MW	FW	FL	FD	PTS
1	(England) Stuart Bingham	5	5	25	9	+16	5
2	(England) Mark Selby	5	4	22	10	+12	4
3	(Thailand) Thepchaiya Un-Nooh	5	3	19	15	+4	3
4	(Australia) Glen Wilkinson	5	2	12	18	−7	2
5	(Brazil) Igor Figueiredo	5	1	15	24	−9	1
6	(India) Yasin Merchant	5	0	8	25	−17	0

- Mark Selby 2–5 Stuart Bingham
- Mark Selby 5–3 Igor Figueiredo
- Glen Wilkinson 2–5 Thepchaiya Un-Nooh
- Igor Figueiredo 2–5 Stuart Bingham
- Yasin Merchant 0–5 Glen Wilkinson
- Yasin Merchant 1–5 Thepchaiya Un-Nooh
- Igor Figueiredo 3–5 Glen Wilkinson
- Mark Selby 5–1 Yasin Merchant
- Igor Figueiredo 2–5 Thepchaiya Un-Nooh
- Glen Wilkinson 0–5 Stuart Bingham
- Igor Figueiredo 5–4 Yasin Merchant
- Thepchaiya Un-Nooh 3–5 Stuart Bingham
- Mark Selby 5–0 Glen Wilkinson
- Mark Selby 5–1 Thepchaiya Un-Nooh
- Yasin Merchant 2–5 Stuart Bingham

=== Group D ===
POS	Player	MP	MW	FW	FL	FD	PTS
1	(Thailand) James Wattana	5	4	23	15	+8	4
2	(England) Nigel Bond	5	3	22	18	+4	3
3	(Wales) Andrew Pagett	5	3	19	17	+2	3
4	(Northern Ireland) Gerard Greene	5	3	19	20	−1	3
5	(Hong Kong) Fung Kwok Wai	5	2	19	22	−3	2
6	(India) Manan Chandra	5	0	15	25	−10	0

- Fung Kwok Wai 2–5 Gerard Greene
- Andrew Paget 5–2 Manan Chandra
- Nigel Bond 3–5 James Wattana
- Andrew Paget 5–4 Fung Kwok Wai
- Manan Chandra 4–5 James Wattana
- Nigel Bond 4–5 Gerard Greene
- Fung Kwok Wai 5–2 James Wattana
- Nigel Bond 5–1 Manan Chandra
- Andrew Paget 0–5 James Wattana
- Nigel Bond 5–3 Fung Kwok Wai
- Manan Chandra 4–5 Gerard Greene
- James Wattana 5–3 Gerard Greene
- Nigel Bond 5–4 Andrew Paget
- Manan Chandra 4–5 Fung Kwok Wai
- Andrew Paget 5–1 Gerard Greene

=== Group E ===
POS	Player	MP	MW	FW	FL	FD	PTS
1	(Wales) Jamie Jones	5	5	25	6	+19	5
2	(England) Judd Trump	5	3	19	16	+3	3
3	(England) Jamie Cope	5	3	20	21	−1	3
4	(Thailand) Noppadon Noppachorn	5	2	18	17	−1	2
5	(China) Yu Delu	5	1	13	22	−9	1
6	(Bahrain) Habib Subah	5	1	11	24	−13	1

- Jamie Cope 5–3 Judd Trump
- Yu Delu 2–5 Jamie Jones
- Habib Subah 2–5 Noppadon Noppachorn
- Jamie Jones 5–1 Noppadon Noppachorn
- Yu Delu 2–5 Judd Trump
- Jamie Cope 5–4 Yu Delu
- Habib Subah 1–5 Jamie Jones
- Noppadon Noppachorn 3–5 Judd Trump
- Jamie Cope 4–5 Habib Subah
- Jamie Jones 5–1 Judd Trump
- Jamie Cope 5–4 Noppadon Noppachorn
- Yu Delu 5–2 Habib Subah
- Jamie Cope 1–5 Jamie Jones
- Yu Delu 0–5 Noppadon Noppachorn
- Habib Subah 1–5 Judd Trump

=== Group F ===
POS	Player	MP	MW	FW	FL	FD	PTS
1	(England) Peter Ebdon	5	4	21	16	+5	4
2	(England) Mark Davis	5	3	18	12	+6	3
3	(Northern Ireland) Joe Swail	5	3	21	17	+4	3
4	(United Arab Emirates) Mohammed Shehab	5	3	19	15	+4	3
5	(England) Sam Craigie	5	1	13	22	−9	1
6	(Thailand) Thanawat Thirapongpaiboon	5	1	13	23	−10	1

- Joe Swail 5–3 Thanawat Thirapongpaiboon
- Peter Ebdon 5–3 Sam Craigie
- Mohammed Shehab 0–5 Mark Davis
- Sam Craigie 3–5 Thanawat Thirapongpaiboon
- Peter Ebdon 5–3 Mark Davis
- Joe Swail 2–5 Sam Craigie
- Peter Ebdon 1–5 Mohammed Shehab
- Thanawat Thirapongpaiboon 1–5 Mark Davis
- Peter Ebdon 5–1 Thanawat Thirapongpaiboon
- Joe Swail 5–4 Mohammed Shehab
- Sam Craigie 1–5 Mark Davis
- Mohammed Shehab 5–3 Thanawat Thirapongpaiboon
- Peter Ebdon 5–4 Joe Swail
- Mohammed Shehab 5–1 Sam Craigie
- Joe Swail 5–0 Mark Davis

=== Group G ===
POS	Player	MP	MW	FW	FL	FD	PTS
1	(England) Michael Holt	5	5	25	14	+11	5
2	(England) Joe Perry	5	3	23	16	+7	3
3	(England) Alfie Burden	5	3	22	17	+5	3
4	(Thailand) Passakorn Suwannawat	5	2	15	19	−4	2
5	(Germany) Patrick Einsle	5	1	15	23	−8	1
6	(Egypt) Mohamed Khairy	5	1	11	22	−11	1

- Patrick Einsle 2–5 Passakorn Suwannawat
- Joe Perry 4–5 Michael Holt
- Joe Perry 5–3 Mohamed Khairy
- Passakorn Suwannawat 2–5 Michael Holt
- Alfie Burden 3–5 Patrick Einsle
- Joe Perry 4–5 Alfie Burden
- Mohamed Khairy 0–5 Michael Holt
- Alfie Burden 5–2 Passakorn Suwannawat
- Joe Perry 5–2 Patrick Einsle
- Mohamed Khairy 2–5 Passakorn Suwannawat
- Alfie Burden 5–1 Mohamed Khairy
- Patrick Einsle 4–5 Michael Holt
- Joe Perry 5–1 Passakorn Suwannawat
- Alfie Burden 4–5 Michael Holt
- Mohamed Khairy 5–2 Patrick Einsle

=== Group H ===
POS	Player	MP	MW	FW	FL	FD	PTS
1	(England) Barry Hawkins	5	4	22	12	+10	4
2	(England) Ricky Walden	5	4	24	17	+7	4
3	(Pakistan) Muhammad Sajjad	5	3	21	17	+4	3
4	(Thailand) Supoj Saenla	5	3	19	16	+3	3
5	(China) Liu Chuang	5	1	14	21	−7	1
6	(United Arab Emirates) Mohammed Al-Joakar	5	0	8	25	−17	0

- Mohammed Al-Joakar 2–5 Supoj Saenla
- Ricky Walden 4–5 Barry Hawkins
- Muhammad Sajjad 5–3 Supoj Saenla
- Liu Chuang 5–1 Mohammed Al-Joakar
- Ricky Walden 5–4 Muhammad Sajjad
- Liu Chuang 0–5 Barry Hawkins
- Muhammad Sajjad 2–5 Barry Hawkins
- Liu Chuang 2–5 Supoj Saenla
- Ricky Walden 5–3 Mohammed Al-Joakar
- Supoj Saenla 5–2 Barry Hawkins
- Ricky Walden 5–4 Liu Chuang
- Muhammad Sajjad 5–1 Mohammed Al-Joakar
- Ricky Walden 5–1 Supoj Saenla
- Mohammed Al-Joakar 1–5 Barry Hawkins
- Liu Chuang 3–5 Muhammad Sajjad

== Knockout stage ==
Last 32; Best of 11 frames
(Wales) Jamie Jones	6
(Thailand) Supoj Saenla	3
(England) Stuart Pettman	3
(England) Mark Selby	6
(England) Joe Perry	6
(Wales) Andrew Pagett	5
(Thailand) Noppon Saengkham	6
(England) Peter Ebdon	4
(England) Barry Hawkins	6
(United Arab Emirates) Mohammed Shehab	5
(Thailand) Thepchaiya Un-Nooh	6
(England) Nigel Bond	2
(Wales) Mark Williams	4
(England) Alfie Burden	6
(Thailand) Noppadon Noppachorn	2
(England) Jimmy White	6
(England) Michael Holt	6
(Australia) Glen Wilkinson	2
(Northern Ireland) Joe Swail	2
(England) Judd Trump	6
(Wales) Darren Morgan	1
(England) Ricky Walden	6
(Thailand) Issara Kachaiwong	5
(Thailand) James Wattana	6
(Scotland) Scott MacKenzie	2
(Northern Ireland) Gerard Greene	6
(Pakistan) Muhammad Sajjad	1
(England) Dave Harold	6
(England) Mark Davis	1
(England) Jamie Cope	6
(Thailand) Passakorn Suwannawat	6
(England) Stuart Bingham	4

Last 16; Best of 11 frames
(Wales) Jamie Jones	3
(England) Mark Selby	6
(England) Joe Perry	6
(Thailand) Noppon Saengkham	4
(England) Barry Hawkins	6
(Thailand) Thepchaiya Un-Nooh	5
(England) Alfie Burden	4
(England) Jimmy White	6
(England) Michael Holt	6
(England) Judd Trump	4
(England) Ricky Walden	6
(Thailand) James Wattana	4
(Northern Ireland) Gerard Greene	6
(England) Dave Harold	3
(England) Jamie Cope	6
(Thailand) Passakorn Suwannawat	2

Quarter-finals; Best of 13 frames
(England) Mark Selby	7
(England) Joe Perry	3
(England) Barry Hawkins	7
(England) Jimmy White	5
(England) Michael Holt	5
(England) Ricky Walden	7
(Northern Ireland) Gerard Greene	1
(England) Jamie Cope	7

Semi-finals; Best of 13 frames
(England) Mark Selby	7
(England) Barry Hawkins	6
(England) Ricky Walden	7
(England) Jamie Cope	6

Final; Best of 15 frames
(England) Mark Selby	8
(England) Ricky Walden	6

== Maximum breaks ==
(Note a maximum break in six-red snooker is 75)

- Andrew Pagett (x2)
- Jimmy White (x2)
- Stuart Bingham
- Jamie Cope
- Jamie Jones
- Barry Hawkins
- Thepchaiya Un-Nooh
- James Wattana
