= 2006 Grand Prix (snooker) =

Royal London Watches Grand Prix

Tournament information
- Dates: 21–29 October 2006
- Venue: A.E.C.C.
- City: Aberdeen
- Country: Scotland
- Organisation: WPBSA
- Format: Ranking event
- Total prize fund: £455,750
- Winner's share: £60,000
- Highest break: Jamie Cope (ENG) (147)

Final
- Champion: Neil Robertson (AUS)
- Runner-up: Jamie Cope (ENG)
- Score: 9–5

The 2006 Royal London Watches Grand Prix was a professional ranking snooker tournament that took place between 21 and 29 October 2006 at the A.E.C.C. in Aberdeen, Scotland.

John Higgins was the defending champion, however he lost 5–2 in the quarter-finals to Mark King. Neil Robertson won his first ranking title by defeating Jamie Cope 9–5 in the final. Earlier on Cope compiled a maximum break in his round robin win over Michael Holt.

== Main draw ==
=== Round-robin stage ===
The first round used a round-robin format. The top 32 and the 16 qualifiers were placed in eight groups of six with the top two from each group qualifying for the knockout stage.

==== Group 2A ====
Player	MP	MW	FW	FL	FD
Alan McManus (SCO)	5	4	13	6	+7
John Higgins (SCO)	5	4	13	7	+6
Issara Kachaiwong (THA)	5	4	13	8	+5
Barry Hawkins (ENG)	5	2	9	9	0
Dominic Dale (WAL)	5	1	8	12	−4
James Wattana (THA)	5	0	1	15	−14

- 21 October:
  - John Higgins 3-0 James Wattana
  - Alan McManus 3-0 Barry Hawkins
  - Issara Kachaiwong 3-2 Dominic Dale
  - Issara Kachaiwong 3-2 Barry Hawkins
- 22 October:
  - Alan McManus 3-1 Dominic Dale
  - John Higgins 3-1 Issara Kachaiwong
  - John Higgins 3-2 Dominic Dale
  - Issara Kachaiwong 3-1 Alan McManus
- 23 October:
  - Issara Kachaiwong 3-0 James Wattana
  - John Higgins 3-1 Barry Hawkins
  - James Wattana 1-3 Alan McManus
- 24 October:
  - John Higgins 1-3 Alan McManus
  - Barry Hawkins 3-0 James Wattana
  - Barry Hawkins 3-0 Dominic Dale
  - James Wattana 0-3 Dominic Dale

==== Group 2B ====
Player	MP	MW	FW	FL	FD
Ryan Day (WAL)	5	4	12	4	+8
Mark King (ENG)	5	3	11	8	+3
Shaun Murphy (ENG)	5	3	11	9	+2
Ali Carter (ENG)	5	3	10	9	+1
Jamie Jones (WAL)	5	2	9	13	−4
Michael Judge (IRL)	5	0	5	15	−10

- 21 October:
  - Ryan Day 3-0 Shaun Murphy
  - Mark King 3-1 Ali Carter
  - Ryan Day 3-0 Ali Carter
  - Shaun Murphy 3-0 Mark King
- 22 October:
  - Shaun Murphy 3-1 Michael Judge
  - Ryan Day 3-0 Jamie Jones
  - Ali Carter 3-0 Michael Judge
- 23 October:
  - Mark King 3-1 Michael Judge
  - Ali Carter 3-1 Jamie Jones
  - Jamie Jones 3-2 Mark King
- 24 October:
  - Michael Judge 2-3 Jamie Jones
  - Ryan Day 0-3 Mark King
  - Shaun Murphy 3-2 Jamie Jones
  - Shaun Murphy 2-3 Ali Carter
  - Ryan Day 3-1 Michael Judge

==== Group 2C ====
Player	MP	MW	FW	FL	FD
Ronnie O'Sullivan (ENG)	5	5	15	4	+11
Jamie Cope (ENG) (Note: Jamie Cope 2nd due to win against Michael Holt, David Roe is 6th due to loss against Marco Fu.)	5	3	10	10	0
Michael Holt (ENG)	5	3	10	8	+2
Steve Davis (ENG)	5	2	9	10	−1
Marco Fu (HKG)	5	1	6	13	−7
David Roe (ENG)	5	1	8	13	−5

- 21 October:
  - Michael Holt 3-0 Marco Fu
  - Ronnie O'Sullivan 3-1 Steve Davis
  - Michael Holt 3-1 David Roe
  - Steve Davis 3-1 Jamie Cope
- 22 October:
  - David Roe 3-1 Steve Davis
  - Ronnie O'Sullivan 3-0 Michael Holt
  - Jamie Cope 3-1 Marco Fu
  - Ronnie O'Sullivan 3-0 Jamie Cope
  - Marco Fu 3-1 David Roe
- 23 October:
  - Ronnie O'Sullivan 3-2 Marco Fu
  - Michael Holt 1-3 Jamie Cope
  - Ronnie O'Sullivan 3-1 David Roe
  - Steve Davis 1-3 Michael Holt
- 24 October:
  - Steve Davis 3-0 Marco Fu
  - Jamie Cope 3-2 David Roe

==== Group 2D ====
Player	MP	MW	FW	FL	FD
Neil Robertson (AUS) (Note: Neil Robertson 1st due to win against Ken Doherty, Paul Davison 6th due to loss against Judd Trump.)	5	4	14	7	+7
Ken Doherty (IRL)	5	4	14	6	+8
Joe Swail (NIR)	5	3	10	10	0
Nigel Bond (ENG)	5	2	9	13	−4
Judd Trump (ENG)	5	1	8	14	−6
Paul Davison (ENG)	5	1	8	13	−5

- 21 October:
  - Nigel Bond 3-2 Neil Robertson
  - Judd Trump 3-2 Paul Davison
  - Neil Robertson 3-1 Joe Swail
  - Ken Doherty 3-2 Nigel Bond
  - Joe Swail 3-2 Judd Trump
- 22 October:
  - Ken Doherty 3-1 Paul Davison
  - Neil Robertson 3-1 Judd Trump
  - Joe Swail 3-2 Paul Davison
  - Ken Doherty 3-0 Judd Trump
  - Joe Swail 3-0 Nigel Bond
- 23 October:
  - Neil Robertson 3-2 Ken Doherty
  - Paul Davison 3-1 Nigel Bond
  - Ken Doherty 3-0 Joe Swail
  - Neil Robertson 3-0 Paul Davison
  - Nigel Bond 3-2 Judd Trump

==== Group 2E ====
Player	MP	MW	FW	FL	FD
Matthew Stevens (WAL)	5	4	12	5	+7
Mark Selby (ENG)	5	3	11	6	+5
Fergal O'Brien (IRL)	5	3	11	9	+2
Liang Wenbo (CHN)	5	3	10	9	+1
Andy Hicks (ENG)	5	1	6	15	−9
Stephen Hendry (SCO)	5	1	7	14	−7

- 21 October:
  - Liang Wenbo 3-1 Fergal O'Brien
  - Stephen Hendry 3-2 Mark Selby
  - Liang Wenbo 3-2 Andy Hicks
- 22 October:
  - Matthew Stevens 3-1 Liang Wenbo
  - Andy Hicks 3-2 Stephen Hendry
  - Mark Selby 3-0 Andy Hicks
- 23 October:
  - Matthew Stevens 3-0 Stephen Hendry
  - Fergal O'Brien 3-1 Andy Hicks
  - Mark Selby 3-0 Liang Wenbo
  - Matthew Stevens 3-1 Fergal O'Brien
- 24 October:
  - Fergal O'Brien 3-2 Stephen Hendry
  - Matthew Stevens 0-3 Mark Selby
  - Stephen Hendry 0-3 Liang Wenbo
  - Matthew Stevens 3-0 Andy Hicks
  - Mark Selby 0-3 Fergal O'Brien

==== Group 2F ====
Player	MP	MW	FW	FL	FD
Stephen Lee (ENG)	4	3	9	7	+2
Ian McCulloch (ENG)	4	3	10	5	+5
Robin Hull (FIN)	4	2	9	7	+2
Gerard Greene (NIR)	4	2	7	8	−1
Stuart Bingham (ENG)	4	0	4	12	−8
Mark Williams (WAL) (Note: Mark Williams withdrew due to wrist injury thus all his results are expunged.)					

- 21 October:
  - ~~Stuart Bingham 3-0 Mark Williams~~
  - Robin Hull 3-1 Gerard Greene
  - Stephen Lee 3-2 Stuart Bingham
- 22 October:
  - Ian McCulloch 3-0 Stuart Bingham
  - ~~Mark Williams 3-1 Stephen Lee~~
  - Ian McCulloch 3-0 Gerard Greene
  - ~~Robin Hull 3-1 Mark Williams~~
- 23 October:
  - Ian McCulloch 3-2 Robin Hull
  - Gerard Greene 3-0 Stephen Lee
  - ~~Mark Williams vs. Gerard Greene~~
- 24 October:
  - Robin Hull 3-0 Stuart Bingham
  - Stuart Bingham 2-3 Gerard Greene
  - Stephen Lee 3-1 Robin Hull
  - Stephen Lee 3-1 Ian McCulloch

==== Group 2G ====
Player	MP	MW	FW	FL	FD
Robert Milkins (ENG)	5	5	15	7	+8
David Gray (ENG)	5	4	13	6	+7
Peter Ebdon (ENG)	5	2	10	11	−1
Tom Ford (ENG)	5	2	10	12	−2
Ben Woollaston (ENG)	5	2	9	12	−3
Anthony Hamilton (ENG)	5	0	6	15	−9

- 21 October:
  - David Gray 3-2 Anthony Hamilton
  - David Gray 3-0 Ben Woollaston
  - Robert Milkins 3-2 Peter Ebdon
- 22 October:
  - Tom Ford 3-2 Anthony Hamilton
  - Ben Woollaston 3-1 Anthony Hamilton
- 23 October:
  - Robert Milkins 3-2 Tom Ford
  - Robert Milkins 3-1 Ben Woolaston
  - Peter Ebdon 1-3 David Gray
  - Peter Ebdon 1-3 Tom Ford
- 24 October:
  - Peter Ebdon 3-0 Anthony Hamilton
  - Robert Milkins 3-1 David Gray
  - Ben Woolaston 3-2 Tom Ford
  - Peter Ebdon 3-2 Ben Woollaston
  - David Gray 3-0 Tom Ford
  - Anthony Hamilton 1-3 Robert Milkins

==== Group 2H ====
Player	MP	MW	FW	FL	FD
Joe Perry (ENG)	5	4	14	4	+10
Andrew Norman (ENG)	5	4	12	9	+3
Stephen Maguire (SCO)	5	3	12	9	+3
Ding Junhui (CHN)	5	2	10	11	−1
Graeme Dott (SCO)	5	2	8	11	−3
Mark Allen (NIR)	5	0	3	15	−12

- 21 October:
  - Graeme Dott 3-2 Joe Perry Stephen
  - Maguire 3-0 Mark Allen
  - Ding Junhui 3-0 Graeme Dott
  - Andrew Norman 3-1 Mark Allen
- 22 October:
  - Andrew Norman 3-2 Ding Junhui
  - Graeme Dott 3-0 Mark Allen
  - Joe Perry 3-1 Stephen Maguire
  - Andrew Norman 3-2 Stephen Maguire
- 23 October:
  - Stephen Maguire 3-1 Graeme Dott
  - Joe Perry 3-0 Andrew Norman
  - Ding Junhui 2-3 Stephen Maguire
  - Joe Perry 3-0 Mark Allen
- 24 October:
  - Graeme Dott 1-3 Andrew Norman
  - Ding Junhui 3-2 Mark Allen
  - Joe Perry 3-0 Ding Junhui

=== Knockout stage ===
Last 16; Best of 9 frames
26 October
Alan McManus (SCO)	5
Mark Selby (ENG)	1
26 October
Ryan Day (WAL)	3
Ian McCulloch (ENG)	5
25 October
Ronnie O'Sullivan (ENG)	5
David Gray (ENG)	2
25 October
Neil Robertson (AUS)	5
Andrew Norman (ENG)	3
26 October
Matthew Stevens (WAL)	4
John Higgins (SCO)	5
26 October
Stephen Lee (ENG)	3
Mark King (ENG)	5
25 October
Robert Milkins (ENG)	0
Jamie Cope (ENG)	5
25 October
Joe Perry (ENG)	5
Ken Doherty (IRL)	0

Quarter-finals; Best of 9 frames
27 October
(Scotland) Alan McManus	5
(England) Ian McCulloch	3
27 October
(England) Ronnie O'Sullivan	1
(Australia) Neil Robertson	5
27 October
(Scotland) John Higgins	2
(England) Mark King	5
27 October
(England) Jamie Cope	5
(England) Joe Perry	4

Semi-finals; Best of 11 frames
28 October
(Scotland) Alan McManus	2
(Australia) Neil Robertson	6
28 October
(England) Mark King	3
(England) Jamie Cope	6

Final; Best of 17 frames
29 October
(Australia) Neil Robertson	9
(England) Jamie Cope	5

== Final ==
Final: Best of 17 frames. Referee: Eirian Williams. Aberdeen Exhibition and Conference Centre, Aberdeen, Scotland, 29 October 2006.
Neil Robertson; Australia	9–5	Jamie Cope; England
Afternoon: 40–67, 100–8 (100), 78–0 (78), 60–59 (Robertson 59), 61–2, 35–70 (55), 59–3; Evening: 63–38, 64–31, 98–9 (68), 0–105 (105), 42–69, 27–57, 70–1 (55)
100	Highest break	105
1	Century breaks	1
5	50+ breaks	2

== Qualifying ==
Qualifying was held between 30 September and 4 October 2006 at Pontin's Prestatyn using a round-robin format. The entries were placed into eight groups with the top 2 from each group qualifying for the finals in Aberdeen.

=== Group 1A ===
Player	MP	MW	FW	FL	FD
Issara Kachaiwong (THA)	7	6	18	9	+9
Jamie Jones (WAL)	7	5	18	11	+7
Ricky Walden (ENG)	7	5	18	9	+9
Jimmy Michie (ENG)	7	4	15	11	+4
Matthew Couch (ENG)	7	3	13	16	−3
Marcus Campbell (SCO)	7	2	14	19	−5
Tian Pengfei (CHN)	7	2	9	19	−10
Joe Delaney (IRL)	7	1	8	19	−11

- 30 September:
  - Ricky Walden 3-1 Marcus Campbell
  - Jimmy Michie 3-0 Joe Delaney
  - Matthew Couch 2-3 Tian Pengfei
  - Jamie Jones 2-3 Issara Kachaiwong
  - Ricky Walden 3-1 Jimmy Michie
  - Marcus Campbell 3-2 Joe Delaney
- 1 October
  - Matthew Couch 3-1 Jamie Jones
  - Tian Pengfei 0-3 Issara Kachaiwong
  - Ricky Walden 3-0 Joe Delaney
  - Marcus Campbell 2-3 Matthew Couch
  - Jimmy Michie 1-3 Jamie Jones
  - Ricky Walden 3-0 Issara Kachaiwong
- 2 October
  - Marcus Campbell 3-2 Tian Pengfei
  - Joe Delaney 1-3 Matthew Couch
  - Jimmy Michie 1-3 Issara Kachaiwong
  - Ricky Walden 2-3 Tian Pengfei
  - Marcus Campbell 2-3 Jamie Jones
  - Joe Delaney 1-3 Issara Kachaiwong
- 3 October
  - Tian Pengfei 0-3 Jamie Jones
  - Marcus Campbell 1-3 Jimmy Michie
  - Matthew Couch 0-3 Issara Kachaiwong
  - Jimmy Michie 3-0 Tian Pengfei
  - Joe Delaney 1-3 Jamie Jones
  - Ricky Walden 3-1 Matthew Couch
- 4 October
  - Marcus Campbell 2-3 Issara Kachaiwong
  - Joe Delaney 3-1 Tian Pengfei
  - Ricky Walden 1-3 Jamie Jones
  - Jimmy Michie 3-1 Matthew Couch

=== Group 1B ===
Player	MP	MW	FW	FL	FD
Michael Judge (IRL)	7	5	18	13	+5
Dominic Dale (WAL)	7	4	17	12	+5
Shokat Ali (PAK)	7	4	17	12	+5
Sean Storey (ENG)	7	4	16	15	+1
Andrew Higginson (ENG)	7	4	15	16	−1
James Leadbetter (ENG)	7	3	14	16	−2
Jamie Burnett (SCO)	7	3	14	16	−2
Roy Stolk (NED)	7	1	7	18	−11

- 30 September:
  - Michael Judge 3-2 Dominic Dale
  - Shokat Ali 2-3 Jamie Burnett
  - Sean Storey 2-3 Andrew Higginson
  - Roy Stolk 2-3 James Leadbetter
  - Michael Judge 3-1 Shokat Ali
  - Dominic Dale 1-3 Jamie Burnett
- 1 October
  - Sean Storey 3-1 Roy Stolk
  - Andrew Higginson 3-2 James Leadbetter
  - Michael Judge 3-2 Jamie Burnett
  - Dominic Dale 3-0 Sean Storey
  - Shokat Ali 3-0 Roy Stolk
  - Michael Judge 1-3 James Leadbetter
- 2 October
  - Dominic Dale 2-3 Andrew Higginson
  - Jamie Burnett 1-3 Sean Storey
  - Shokat Ali 3-0 James Leadbetter
  - Michael Judge 3-2 Andrew Higginson
  - Dominic Dale 3-0 Roy Stolk
  - Jamie Burnett 1-3 James Leadbetter
- 3 October
  - Andrew Higginson 0-3 Roy Stolk
  - Dominic Dale 3-2 Shokat Ali
  - Sean Storey 3 -2 James Leadbetter
  - Shokat Ali 3-1 Andrew Higginson
  - Jamie Burnett 3-1 Roy Stolk
  - Michael Judge 2-3 Sean Storey
- 4 October
  - Dominic Dale 3-1 James Leadbetter
  - Jamie Burnett 1-3 Andrew Higginson
  - Michael Judge 3-0 Roy Stolk
  - Shokat Ali 3-2 Sean Storey

=== Group 1C ===
Player	MP	MW	FW	FL	FD
Jamie Cope (ENG)	7	6	19	6	+13
Paul Davison (ENG)	7	4	16	11	+5
Chris Melling (ENG)	7	4	16	13	+3
Rory McLeod (ENG)	7	4	14	13	+1
Tony Drago (MLT)	7	4	16	16	0
Rod Lawler (ENG)	7	3	14	16	−2
Mark Boyle (SCO)	7	2	9	19	−10
Passakorn Suwannawat (THA)	7	1	10	20	−10

- 30 September:
  - Rod Lawler 0-3 Jamie Cope
  - Rory McLeod 2-3 Tony Drago
  - Chris Melling 1-3 Paul Davison
  - Mark Boyle 3-2 Passakorn Suwannawat
  - Rod Lawler 1-3 Rory McLeod
  - Jamie Cope 3-1 Tony Drago
- 1 October
  - Chris Melling 3-0 Mark Boyle
  - Paul Davison 2-3 Passakorn Suwannawat
  - Rod Lawler 3-2 Tony Drago
  - Jamie Cope 3-1 Chris Melling
  - Rory McLeod 3-2 Mark Boyle
  - Rod Lawler 3-1 Passakorn Suwannawat
- 2 October
  - Jamie Cope 3-1 Paul Davison
  - Tony Drago 3-2 Chris Melling
  - Rory McLeod 3-0 Passakorn Suwannawat
  - Rod Lawler 3-1 Paul Davison
  - Jamie Cope 3-0 Mark Boyle
  - Tony Drago 3-2 Passakorn Suwannawat
- 3 October
  - Paul Davison 3-0 Mark Boyle
  - Jamie Cope 1-3 Rory McLeod
  - Chris Melling 3-2 Passakorn Suwannawat
  - Rory McLeod 0-3 Paul Davison
  - Tony Drago 3-1 Mark Boyle
  - Rod Lawler 2-3 Chris Melling
- 4 October
  - Jamie Cope 3-0 Passakorn Suwannawat
  - Tony Drago 1-3 Paul Davison
  - Rod Lawler 2-3 Mark Boyle
  - Rory McLeod 0-3 Chris Melling

=== Group 1D ===
Player	MP	MW	FW	FL	FD
Judd Trump (ENG)	7	6	19	6	+13
David Roe (ENG)	7	5	18	10	+8
Ian Preece (WAL)	7	4	15	11	+4
John Parrott (ENG)	7	4	15	13	+2
Dermot McGlinchey (NIR)	7	3	11	18	−7
David Gilbert (ENG)	7	3	13	13	0
Drew Henry (SCO)	7	2	11	18	−7
Jeff Cundy (ENG)	7	1	7	20	−13

- 30 September:
  - John Parrott 3-2 Drew Henry
  - David Gilbert 1-3 David Roe
  - Judd Trump 3-0 Ian Preece
  - Dermot McGlinchey 3-2 Jeff Cundy
  - John Parrott 3-1 David Gilbert
  - Drew Henry 3-2 David Roe
- 1 October
  - Judd Trump 3-0 Dermot McGlinchey
  - Ian Preece 2-3 Jeff Cundy
  - John Parrott 1-3 David Roe
  - Drew Henry 1-3 Judd Trump
  - David Gilbert 2-3 Dermot McGlinchey
  - John Parrott 3-0 Jeff Cundy
- 2 October
  - Drew Henry 0-3 Ian Preece
  - David Roe 1-3 Judd Trump
  - David Gilbert 3-0 Jeff Cundy
  - John Parrott 2-3 Ian Preece
  - Drew Henry 2-3 Dermot McGlinchey
  - David Roe 3-0 Jeff Cundy
- 3 October
  - Ian Preece 3-0 Dermot McGlinchey
  - Drew Henry 0-3 David Gilbert
  - Judd Trump 3-1 Jeff Cundy
  - David Gilbert 0-3 Ian Preece
  - David Roe 3-1 Dermot McGlinchey
  - John Parrott 0-3 Judd Trump
- 4 October
  - Drew Henry 3-1 Jeff Cundy
  - David Roe 3-1 Ian Preece
  - John Parrott 3-1 Dermot McGlinchey
  - David Gilbert 3-1 Judd Trump

=== Group 1E ===
Player	MP	MW	FW	FL	FD
Liang Wenbo (CHN)	7	5	18	9	+9
Gerard Greene (ENG)	7	4	16	12	+4
David Morris (IRL)	7	4	14	11	+3
Peter Lines (ENG)	7	4	14	13	+1
Scott MacKenzie (SCO)	7	4	14	15	−1
Barry Pinches (ENG)	7	3	12	16	−4
Mike Dunn (ENG)	7	2	12	16	−4
Paul Wykes (ENG)	7	2	9	17	−8

- 30 September:
  - Barry Pinches 1-3 Gerrard Greene
  - Mike Dunn 2-3 Scott Mackenzie
  - Paul Wykes 1-3 Liang Wenbo
  - David Morris 3-0 Peter Lines
  - Barry Pinches 1-3 Mike Dun
  - Gerard Greene 3-0 Scott Mackenzie
- 1 October
  - Paul Wykes 0-3 David Morris
  - Liang Wenbo 3-0 Peter Lines
  - Barry Pinches 1-3 Scott Mackenzie
  - Gerard Greene 1-3 Paul Wykes
  - Mike Dunn 1-3 David Morris
  - Barry Pinches 0-3 Peter Lines
- 2 October
  - Gerard Greene 1-3 Liang Wenbo
  - Scott Mackenzie 1-3 Paul Wykes
  - Mike Dunn 2-3 Peter Lines
  - Barry Pinches 3-2 Liang Wenbo
  - Gerard Greene 3-1 David Morris
  - Scott Mackenzie 3-2 Peter Lines
- 3 October
  - Liang Wenbo 3-1 David Morris
  - Gerard Greene 3-1 Mike Dunn
  - Paul Wykes 0-3 Peter Lines
  - Mike Dunn 0-3 Liang Wenbo
  - Scott Mackenzie 1-3 David Morris
  - Barry Pinches 3-2 Paul Wykes
- 4 October
  - Gerard Greene 3-2 Peter Lines
  - Scott Mackenzie 3-1 Liang Wenbo
  - Barry Pinches 3-0 David Morris
  - Mike Dunn 3-0 Paul Wykes

=== Group 1F ===
Player	MP	MW	FW	FL	FD
Robin Hull (FIN)	7	6	20	10	+10
Fergal O'Brien (IRL)	7	6	20	8	+12
Adrian Gunnell (ENG)	7	5	17	14	+3
Chris Norbury (ENG)	7	3	15	14	+1
Mohammed Shehab (UAE)	7	3	15	16	−1
Stuart Pettman (ENG)	7	2	9	17	−8
Alex Borg (MLT)	7	2	9	17	−8
Liu Song (CHN)	7	1	10	19	−9

- 30 September:
  - Adrian Gunnell 0-3 Fergal O’Brien
  - Robin Hull 3-0 Stuart Pettman
  - Chris Norbury 1-3 Liu Song
  - Alex Borg 1-3 Mohammed Shehab
  - Adrian Gunnell 3-2 Robin Hull
  - Fergal O’Brien 3-1 Stuart Pettman
- 1 October
  - Chris Norbury 3-1 Alex Borg
  - Liu Song 1-3 Mohammed Shehab
  - Adrian Gunnell 3-0 Stuart Pettman
  - Fergal O’Brien 3-2 Chris Norbury
  - Robin Hull 3-1 Alex Borg
  - Adrian Gunnell 3-2 Mohammed Shehab
- 2 October
  - Fergal O’Brien 3-0 Liu Song
  - Stuart Pettman 0-3 Chris Norbury
  - Robin Hull 3-1 Mohammed Shehab
  - Adrian Gunnell 3-2 Liu Song
  - Fergal O’Brien 3-0 Alex Borg
  - Stuart Pettman 2-3 Mohammed Shehab
- 3 October
  - Liu Song 0-3 Alex Borg
  - Fergal O’Brien 2-3 Robin Hull
  - Chris Norbury 3-1 Mohammed Shehab
  - Robin Hull 3-2 Liu Song
  - Stuart Pettman 3-0 Alex Borg
  - Adrian Gunnell 3-2 Chris Norbury
- 4 October
  - Fergal O’Brien 3-2 Mohammed Shehab
  - Stuart Pettman 3-2 Liu Song
  - Adrian Gunnell 2-3 Alex Borg
  - Robin Hull 3-1 Chris Norbury

=== Group 1G ===
Player	MP	MW	FW	FL	FD
Ben Woollaston (ENG)	7	7	21	7	+14
Andrew Norman (ENG)	7	5	17	12	+5
Mark Davis (ENG)	7	5	16	10	+6
Dave Harold (ENG)	7	4	14	11	+3
Paul Davies (WAL)	7	3	14	14	0
Robert Stephen (SCO)	7	2	9	15	−6
Mark Joyce (ENG)	7	2	10	17	−7
Lee Page (ENG)	7	0	6	21	−15

- 30 September:
  - Dave Harold 0-3 Mark Davis
  - Paul Davies 1-3 Andrew Norman
  - Mark Joyce 3-1 Lee Page
  - Robert Stephen 0-3 Ben Woollaston
  - Dave Harold 3-1 Paul Davies
  - Mark Davis 1-3 Andrew Norman
- 1 October
  - Mark Joyce 0-3 Robert Stephen
  - Lee Page 0-3 Ben Woollaston
  - Dave Harold 0-3 Andrew Norman
  - Mark Davis 3-1 Mark Joyce
  - Paul Davies 3-1 Robert Stephen
  - Dave Harold 2-3 Ben Woollaston
- 2 October
  - Mark Davies 3-2 Lee Page
  - Andrew Norman 1-3 Mark Joyce
  - Paul Davies 2-3 Ben Woollaston
  - Dave Harold 3-0 Lee Page
  - Mark Davis 3-0 Robert Stephen
  - Andrew Norman 1-3 Ben Woollaston
- 3 October
  - Lee Page 0-3 Robert Stephen
  - Mark Davis 3-1 Paul Davies
  - Mark Joyce 2-3 Ben Woollaston
  - Paul Davies 3-1 Lee Page
  - Andrew Norman 3-2 Robert Stephen
  - Dave Harold 3-1 Mark Joyce
- 4 October
  - Mark Davis 0-3 Ben Woollaston Andrew
  - Norman 3-2 Lee Page
  - Dave Harold 3-0 Robert Stephen
  - Paul Davies 3-0 Mark Joyce

=== Group 1H ===
Player	MP	MW	FW	FL	FD
Mark Allen (NIR)	6	4	15	12	+3
Tom Ford (ENG)	6	4	14	12	+2
Lee Spick (ENG)	6	3	10	9	+1
Jimmy White (ENG)	6	3	12	12	0
Alfie Burden (ENG)	6	3	11	11	0
Patrick Einsle (GER)	6	2	11	15	−4
Joe Jogia (ENG)	6	2	11	13	−2

- 30 September:
  - Tom Ford 3-2 Jimmy White
  - Mark Allen 3-2 Joe Jogia
  - Alfie Burden 3-0 Lee Spick
  - Tom Ford 2-3 Mark Allen
  - Jimmy White 1-3 Joe Jogia
- 1 October
  - Alfie Burden 2-3 Patrick Einsle
  - Tom Ford 3-2 Joe Jogia
  - Jimmy White 3-0 Alfie Burden
  - Mark Allen 3-1 Patrick Einsle
- 2 October
  - Jimmy White 0-3 Lee Spick
  - Joe Jogia 3-0 Alfie Burden
  - Tom Ford 3-0 Lee Spick
  - Jimmy White 3-2 Patrick Einsle
- 3 October
  - Lee Spick 3-0 Patrick Einsle
  - Jimmy White 3-1 Mark Allen
  - Mark Allen 3-1 Lee Spick
  - Joe Jogia 1-3 Patrick Einsle
  - Tom Ford 0-3 Alfie Burden
- 4 October
  - Joe Jogia 0-3 Lee Spick
  - Tom Ford 3-2 Patrick Einsle Mark
  - Allen 2-3 Alfie Burden

== Century breaks ==
=== Qualifying stage centuries ===
- 141, 122, 100 – Fergal O'Brien
- 141 – Marcus Campbell
- 137, 120, 100 – Jamie Cope
- 137, 108 – Ricky Walden
- 135 – Barry Pinches
- 135 – Chris Norbury
- 134, 102 – Paul Davison
- 133 – Andrew Norman
- 133 – Ben Woollaston
- 132 – Mohammed Shehab
- 131, 106 – Adrian Gunnell
- 128 – Jimmy Michie
- 124 – Dominic Dale
- 122 – Paul Davies
- 120 – Scott MacKenzie
- 117 – David Morris
- 117 – Mark Allen
- 116, 101 – Tom Ford
- 115 – Shokat Ali
- 115 – Jamie Burnett
- 114, 104, 101 – Gerard Greene
- 114 – Lee Page
- 110 – Joe Jogia
- 109 – Rory McLeod
- 108 – Chris Melling
- 107, 106 – Jamie Jones
- 107 – Lee Spick
- 106 – Mark Boyle
- 106 – Mike Dunn
- 105 – Jeff Cundy
- 104 – Jimmy White
- 104 – Mark Davis
- 102 – Stuart Pettman
- 101 – Passakorn Suwannawat
- 101 – Judd Trump
- 100 – Robin Hull

=== Televised stage centuries ===
- 147, 105 – Jamie Cope
- 144 – Robin Hull
- 142, 131 – Fergal O'Brien
- 142 – Issara Kachaiwong
- 141 – Stuart Bingham
- 140 – Ryan Day
- 139, 107 – Mark Selby
- 136, 133, 129, 118, 113, 107, 104 – Ronnie O'Sullivan
- 128, 100 – Ken Doherty
- 126 – David Roe
- 123 – Gerard Greene
- 121, 120, 106, 106 – John Higgins
- 121 – Tom Ford
- 119, 102 – Joe Perry
- 116, 100 – Neil Robertson
- 112, 100 – Stephen Maguire
- 110, 102 – Stephen Lee
- 109, 104 – Michael Judge
- 107 – Nigel Bond
- 106, 104 – Mark King
- 105 – Ding Junhui
- 104, 101 – Ian McCulloch
- 104 – Shaun Murphy
- 103 – Dominic Dale
- 102 – Ben Woollaston
- 101, 100 – Alan McManus
- 101 – Andrew Norman
