= 2004 General Cup International =

General Cup
Tournament information
- Dates: 11–16 September 2004
- Venue: General Snooker Club
- Country: Hong Kong
- Format: Non-ranking event
- Highest break: 112

Final
- Champion: (Thailand) Issara Kachaiwong
- Runner-up: (Wales) Dominic Dale
- Score: 6–3

The 2004 General Cup was a professional non-ranking snooker tournament that took place between 11 and 16 September 2004 at the General Snooker Club in Hong Kong.

Issara Kachaiwong defeated Dominic Dale 6–3 in the final.

== Group stage ==
=== Group A ===
POS	Player	MP	MW	FW	FL	FD	PTS
1	(China) Pang Weiguo	3	2	11	7	+4	2
2	(Thailand) Atthasit Mahitthi	3	2	10	8	+2	2
3	(England) Gary Wilson	3	2	9	9	0	2
4	(Hong Kong) Au Chi-wai	3	0	6	12	−6	0

- Pang Weiguo 4–2 Atthasit Mahitthi
- Pang Weiguo 3–4 Gary Wilson
- Pang Weiguo 4–1 Au Chi Wai
- Atthasit Mahitthi 4–1 Gary Wilson
- Atthasit Mahitthi 4–3 Au Chi Wai
- Gary Wilson 4–2 Au Chi Wai

=== Group B ===
POS	Player	MP	MW	FW	FL	FD	PTS
1	(Northern Ireland) Mark Allen	3	3	12	4	+8	3
2	(Hong Kong) Fung Kwok Wai	3	2	9	7	+2	2
3	(China) Mei Xiwen	3	1	8	9	−1	1
4	(Malaysia) Liew Kit Fatt	3	0	3	12	−9	0

- Mark Allen 4–1 Fung Kwok Wai
- Mark Allen 4–2 Mei Xi Wen
- Mark Allen 4–1 Liew Kit Fatt
- Fung Kwok Wai 4–2 Mei Xi Wen
- Fung Kwok Wai 4–1 Liew Kit Fatt
- Mei Xi Wen 4–1 Liew Kit Fatt

=== Group C ===
POS	Player	MP	MW	FW	FL	FD	PTS
1	(China) Cai Jian Zhong	3	3	12	8	+4	3
2	(Thailand) Issara Kachaiwong	3	2	10	8	+2	2
3	(Hong Kong) Chan Wai Kei	3	1	9	11	−6	1
4	(India) Pankaj Advani	3	0	8	12	−4	0

- Cai Jian Zhong 4–2 Issara Kachaiwong
- Cai Jian Zhong 4–3 Chan Wai Kei
- Cai Jian Zhong 4–3 Pankaj Advani
- Issara Kachaiwong 4–2 Chan Wai Kei
- Issara Kachaiwong 4–2 Pankaj Advani
- Chan Wai Kei 4–3 Pankaj Advani

=== Group D ===
POS	Player	MP	MW	FW	FL	FD	PTS
1	(Wales) Dominic Dale	3	3	12	5	+7	3
2	(Hong Kong) Chan Kwok Ming	3	2	10	7	+3	2
3	(Malaysia) Ooi Chin Kay	3	1	7	11	−4	1
4	(India) Aditya Mehta	3	0	6	12	−6	0

- Dominic Dale 4–2 Chan Kwok Ming
- Dominic Dale 4–2 Ooi Chin Kay
- Dominic Dale 4–1 Aditya Mehta
- Chan Kwok Ming 4–1 Ooi Chin Kay
- Chan Kwok Ming 4–2 Aditya Mehta
- Ooi Chin Kay 4–3 Aditya Mehta

== Knock-out stage ==
Quarter-finals; Best of 7 frames
(China) Pang Weiguo	1
(Thailand) Issara Kachaiwong	4
(Northern Ireland) Mark Allen	4
(Hong Kong) Chan Kwok Ming	2
(China) Cai Jian Zhong	2
(Thailand) Atthasit Mahitthi	4
(Wales) Dominic Dale	4
(Hong Kong) Fung Kwok Wai	2

Semi-finals; Best of 9 frames
(Thailand) Issara Kachaiwong	5
(Northern Ireland) Mark Allen	4
(Thailand) Atthasit Mahitthi	2
(Wales) Dominic Dale	5

Final; Best of 11 frames
(Thailand) Issara Kachaiwong	6
(Wales) Dominic Dale	3

== Century breaks ==
- 112 – Mark Allen
- 105 – Dominic Dale
