= Issara Kachaiwong =

Thai snooker player

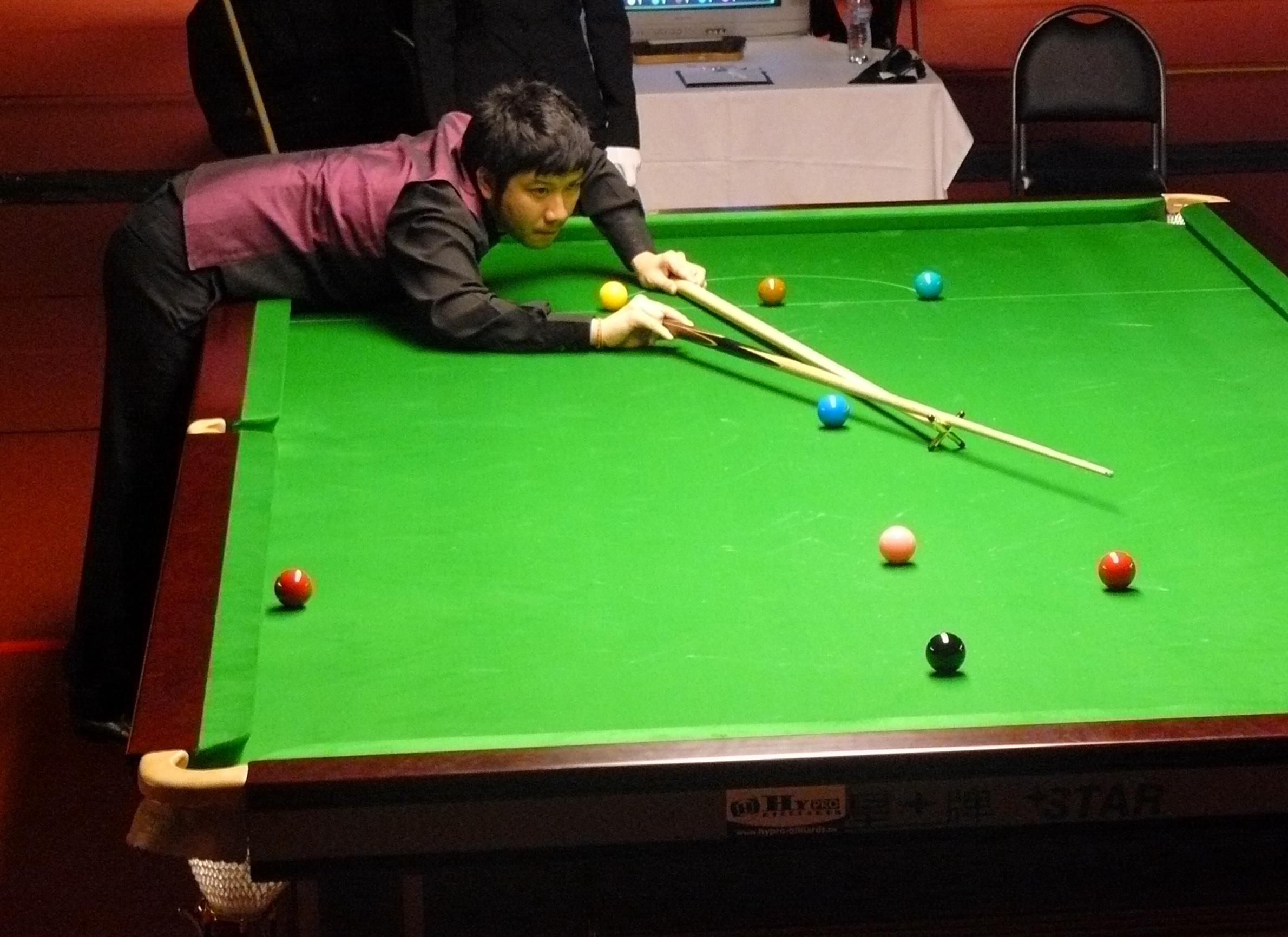

Personal information
- Born: October 4, 1983 (age 43) Chanthaburi, Thailand

Sport
- Country: Thailand
- Sport: Snooker
- Professional: 2006–2008, 2010/2011
- Highest ranking: 86 (April–May 2011)
Medal record
Men's Snooker
Representing Thailand
Southeast Asian Games
Bronze medal – third place	2003 Ho Chi Minh City	Individual
Gold medal – first place	2005 Makati	Individual
Gold medal – first place	2005 Makati	Doubles
Bronze medal – third place	2009 Vientiane	Doubles
Gold medal – first place	2013 Naypyidaw	Individual
Gold medal – first place	2013 Naypyidaw	6-red doubles
Silver medal – second place	2017 Kuala Lumpur	Doubles

Issara Kachaiwong (Thai: อิศรา กะไชยวงษ์; born October 4, 1983, in Chanthaburi, Thailand), is a Thai former professional snooker player.

== Career ==
Kachaiwong became the Thai national under-20 champion. He won the first edition of the General Cup International, defeating players like Mark Allen and Dominic Dale and also capturing a gold medal at the 2004 Thai Games, before he finally qualified for the main tour by winning the 2006 Asian championships, defeating Mohammed Shehab 6–3 in the final.

His best performance in the debut season came at the 2006 Grand Prix in October in Aberdeen. During that tournament he won 4 of his five matches during the group stages. His only loss came against John Higgins. However he failed to make the top two as both Higgins and Alan McManus, who Kachaiwong had beaten, had better frame differences. He was the only player who won four times in the group stages who did not make it through to the knockout stages. The rest of Kachaiwong's results was not good enough to keep him on tour, but he was handed a wild card for another season. Despite a last 64 run at the season-ending World Championship, he was again relegated.

At the 2010 ACBS Asian Snooker Championship Kachaiwong beat Mohammad Sajjad from Pakistan 7–3 in the final to become the champion and regained his tour card for the 2010–11 season. At the China Open where he reached the final qualifying round. He finished the season 87th in the world rankings and failed to retain his place on the tour.

== Performance and rankings timeline ==
Tournament	2004/ 05	2006/ 07	2007/ 08	2008/ 09	2009/ 10	2010/ 11	2012/ 13	2013/ 14
Ranking (Note: It shows the ranking at the beginning of the season)	(Note: He was an amateur)	(Note: New players on the Main Tour do not have a ranking)	79					
Ranking tournaments
Shanghai Masters	Not Held		WD	A	A	LQ	A	A
UK Championship	A	LQ	LQ	A	A	LQ	A	A
German Masters	Tournament Not Held					LQ	A	A
Welsh Open	A	LQ	LQ	A	A	LQ	A	A
World Open (Note: The event was called the Grand Prix (2004/2005, 2006/2007-2009/2010))	A	RR	LQ	A	A	LQ	A	A
Players Tour Championship Grand Final	Tournament Not Held					DNQ	DNQ	DNQ
China Open	A	LQ	LQ	A	A	LQ	A	A
World Championship	A	LQ	LQ	A	A	LQ	A	A
Non-ranking tournaments
Six-red World Championship (Note: The event was called the Six-red Snooker International (2008/2009) and the Six-red World Grand Prix (2009/2010))	Not Held			RR	QF	2R	QF	2R
General Cup	W	Not Held			A	NH	A	A
The Masters	A	LQ	LQ	A	A	A	A	A
Former ranking tournaments
Malta Cup	A	LQ	NR	Tournament Not Held				
Northern Ireland Trophy	NH	LQ	LQ	A	Tournament Not Held			
Former non-ranking tournaments
Thailand Masters	NH	F	Tournament Not Held					

Performance Table Legend
LQ	lost in the qualifying draw	#R	lost in the early rounds of the tournament (WR = Wildcard round, RR = Round robin)	QF	lost in the quarter-finals
SF	lost in the semi-finals	F	lost in the final	W	won the tournament
DNQ	did not qualify for the tournament	A	did not participate in the tournament	WD	withdrew from the tournament

NH / Not Held	means an event was not held.
NR / Non-Ranking Event	means an event is/was no longer a ranking event.
R / Ranking Event	means an event is/was a ranking event.
MR / Minor-Ranking Event	means an event is/was a minor-ranking event.
PA / Pro-am Event	means an event is/was a pro-am event.

== Career finals ==
=== Non-ranking finals: 3 (2 titles) ===
Outcome	No.	Year	Championship	Opponent in the final	Score
Winner	1.	2004	General Cup	(Wales) Dominic Dale	6–3
Winner	2.	2005	Thailand International Cup	(Thailand) Nittiwat Kanjanasri	4–0
Runner-up	1.	2006	Thailand Masters	(Hong Kong) Marco Fu	3–5

=== Pro-am finals: 1 (1 title) ===
Outcome	No.	Year	Championship	Opponent in the final	Score
Winner	1.	2013	Southeast Asian Games (2)	(Myanmar) Win Ko Ko	4–1

=== Amateur finals: 6 (5 titles) ===
Outcome	No.	Year	Championship	Opponent in the final	Score
Winner	1.	2005	Thailand Amateur Championship	(Thailand) Kobkit Palajin	5–3
Winner	2.	2006	ACBS Asian Championship	(United Arab Emirates) Mohammed Shehab	6–3
Winner	3.	2006	Thailand Amateur Championship (2)	(Thailand) Atthasit Mahitthi	5–4
Runner-up	1.	2008	Thailand Amateur Championship	(Thailand) James Wattana	1–5
Winner	4.	2010	ACBS Asian Championship (2)	(Pakistan) Muhammad Sajjad	7–3
Winner	5.	2024	World Amateur Championship - Masters	(Afghanistan) Saleh Mohammad	4–3
