= Mark Boyle (snooker player) =

Scottish snooker player

Mark Anthony Boyle
Personal information
- Born: 19 December 1981 (age 44) Stirling

Sport
- Country: Scotland
- Sport: Snooker
- Professional: 2006/2007, 2009/2010
- Highest ranking: 77 (2009/2010)

Mark Boyle (born 19 December 1981) is a Scottish former professional snooker player. He first joined the professional tour for the 2006–07 season, but dropped off at the end of the season. He returned in 2009–10.

He was runner-up at the 2006 IBSF World Grand Prix

== Tournament wins ==
Billiards

- 2003 Scottish Billiards Champion
- 2004 Scottish Billiards Champion

Snooker

- 2005 Home International Champions (Team Scotland)
- 2008 Scottish Champion
- 2009 Scottish Champion

Pool

- 2018 IPA Premier League Champion
- 2018 IPA British Open Champion
- 2018 English Open Champion
- 2018 Scottish IM2 Champion
- 2018 Scottish Super 11's Champions With Falkirk.
- 2018 IPA Scottish Professional Champion
- 2018 IPA World Doubles Champions, with Liam Dunster.
- 2017 IPA Welsh Open Champion
- 2017 IPA English Open Champion
- 2017 IPA English Amateur Champion
- 2017 EBA UK Champion
- 2017 Scottish IM2 Champion
- 2017 Scottish IM4 Champion
- 2017 Scottish Super 15's Champions with Falkirk.
- 2016 Scottish IM4 Champion
- 2014 Scottish IM1 Champion
- 2014 Scottish IM2 Champion
- 2013 Scottish Champion
- 2013 Scottish IM1 Champion
- 2013 Scottish IM2 Champion
- 2013 Scottish IM4 Champion
- 2012 Scottish IM2 Champion
- 2011 Scottish IM3 Champion
- 2011 Scottish IM6 Champion

International Team Events. (for Team Scotland)

- 2018 European Championship Winners
- 2015 Nation Cup Winners
- 2012 European Championship Winners
