= 2022 German Masters =

Snooker tournament

2022 BildBet German Masters

Tournament information
- Dates: 26–30 January 2022
- Venue: Tempodrom
- City: Berlin
- Country: Germany
- Organisation: World Snooker Tour
- Format: Ranking event
- Total prize fund: £400,000
- Winner's share: £80,000
- Highest break: Thepchaiya Un-Nooh (THA) (147)

Final
- Champion: Zhao Xintong (CHN)
- Runner-up: Yan Bingtao (CHN)
- Score: 9–0

The 2022 German Masters (officially the 2022 BildBet German Masters) was a professional ranking snooker tournament that took place from 26 to 30 January 2022 at the Tempodrom in Berlin, Germany. The tournament was the ninth ranking event of the 2021–22 snooker season and the 16th edition of the German Masters, first held in 1995 as the German Open. The fifth of eight tournaments in the European Series, it was the first professional snooker tournament held outside the United Kingdom in almost two years, due to the impact of the COVID-19 pandemic.

Judd Trump was the defending champion, having defeated Jack Lisowski 9–2 in the 2021 final. However, Trump lost 1–5 in the quarter-finals to Zhao Xintong, who went on to meet Yan Bingtao in the final. Aged 24 and 21 respectively, Zhao and Yan had the youngest combined age of any two ranking finalists since Neil Robertson played Jamie Cope at the 2006 Grand Prix. It was the second time that two players from mainland China contested a ranking final; the previous occasion was the 2013 Shanghai Masters final between Ding Junhui and Xiao Guodong. Zhao whitewashed Yan 9–0 in the final to win the second ranking title of his career. He became the third player in professional snooker history, after Steve Davis at the 1989 Grand Prix and Robertson at the January 2020 European Masters, to win a two-session ranking final without conceding a frame.

The tournament's highest break was achieved by Thepchaiya Un-Nooh, who made the third maximum break of his career in his first qualifying round match against Fan Zhengyi.

== Prize fund ==
The event features a total prize fund of £400,000 with the winner receiving £80,000. The event is the fifth of the eight events in the European Series, all sponsored by sports betting company BetVictor. (BildBet is BetVictor's German sports betting platform, launched in partnership with the German tabloid newspaper Bild.) The player accumulating the highest amount of prize money over the eight events will receive a bonus of £150,000.

- Winner: £80,000
- Runner-up: £35,000
- Semi-final: £20,000
- Quarter-final: £10,000
- Last 16: £5,000
- Last 32: £4,000
- Last 64: £3,000
- Highest break: £5,000
- Total: £400,000

== Main draw ==
Below are the event's results from the last-32 stage to the final. Player names in bold denote match winners. Numbers in brackets denote player seedings.

**Last 32**; Best of 9 frames
**Judd Trump (ENG) (1)**	**w/o**
Gao Yang (CHN)	w/d
Anthony McGill (SCO) (16)	2
**Zhou Yuelong (CHN) (17)**	**5**
**Tom Ford (ENG) (24)**	**5**
Stephen Maguire (SCO) (9)	2
**Zhao Xintong (CHN) (25)**	**5**
Mark Williams (WAL) (8)	3
**Kyren Wilson (ENG) (5)**	**5**
Jimmy Robertson (ENG)	1
Michael Georgiou (CYP)	2
**Craig Steadman (ENG)**	**5**
Zhang Anda (CHN)	3
**Luca Brecel (BEL)**	**5**
**Ricky Walden (ENG) (29)**	**5**
Neil Robertson (AUS) (4)	3
**Andrew Higginson (ENG)**	**w/o**
Liang Wenbo (CHN) (30)	w/d
Liam Highfield (ENG)	2
**Fan Zhengyi (CHN)**	**5**
Lyu Haotian (CHN)	1
**Mark Allen (NIR) (11)**	**5**
Kurt Maflin (NOR) (27)	4
**Shaun Murphy (ENG) (6)**	**5**
Noppon Saengkham (THA)	2
**Ryan Day (WAL) (26)**	**5**
**Sam Craigie (ENG)**	**5**
Ken Doherty (IRL)	3
David Gilbert (ENG) (18)	3
**Yan Bingtao (CHN) (15)**	**5**
Barry Pinches (ENG)	0
**Mark Selby (ENG) (2)**	**5**

**Last 16**; Best of 9 frames
**(England) Judd Trump (1)**	**5**
(China) Zhou Yuelong (17)	0
(England) Tom Ford (24)	1
**(China) Zhao Xintong (25)**	**5**
**(England) Kyren Wilson (5)**	**5**
(England) Craig Steadman	4
(Belgium) Luca Brecel	2
**(England) Ricky Walden (29)**	**5**
(England) Andrew Higginson	3
**(China) Fan Zhengyi**	**5**
**(Northern Ireland) Mark Allen (11)**	**5**
(England) Shaun Murphy (6)	3
**(Wales) Ryan Day (26)**	**5**
(England) Sam Craigie	1
**(China) Yan Bingtao (15)**	**5**
(England) Mark Selby (2)	4

**Quarter-finals**; Best of 9 frames
(England) Judd Trump (1)	1
**(China) Zhao Xintong (25)**	**5**
(England) Kyren Wilson (5)	1
**(England) Ricky Walden (29)**	**5**
(China) Fan Zhengyi	0
**(Northern Ireland) Mark Allen (11)**	**5**
(Wales) Ryan Day (26)	4
**(China) Yan Bingtao (15)**	**5**

**Semi-finals**; Best of 11 frames
**(China) Zhao Xintong (25)**	**6**
(England) Ricky Walden (29)	3
(Northern Ireland) Mark Allen (11)	4
**(China) Yan Bingtao (15)**	**6**

**Final**; Best of 17 frames
**(China) Zhao Xintong (25)**	**9**
(China) Yan Bingtao (15)	0

=== Final ===
Final: Best of 17 frames. Referee: Marcel Eckardt; Tempodrom, Berlin, Germany, 30 January 2022.
**Zhao Xintong** (25); China	**9**–0	Yan Bingtao (15); China
Afternoon: **91**–36, **71**–38, **130**–1 (118), **90**–4, **89**–33, **98**–34, **70**–60, **75**–26; Evening: **63**–31
**118**	Highest break	60
**1**	Century breaks	0

== Qualifying ==
Qualifying for the event took place between 18 and 26 October 2021 at the Chase Leisure Centre in Cannock, England. There were two rounds of qualifying, with matches being played as best-of-nine frames.

Round 1 Best of 9 frames
Judd Trump (ENG) (1)	5
Tian Pengfei (CHN)	1
Aaron Hill (IRL)	2
Anthony Hamilton (ENG)	5
Xiao Guodong (CHN) (32)	5
Duane Jones (WAL)	1
Gao Yang (CHN)	5
Stephen Hendry (SCO)	2
Anthony McGill (SCO) (16)	5
Louis Heathcote (ENG)	2
Hammad Miah (ENG)	4
Jamie O'Neill (ENG)	5
Zhou Yuelong (CHN) (17)	5
Peter Devlin (ENG)	1
Zak Surety (ENG)	5
Mark Joyce (ENG)	2
Ashley Hugill (ENG)	4
Allan Taylor (ENG)	5
Tom Ford (ENG) (24)	5
Joe O'Connor (ENG)	4
Lukas Kleckers (GER)	2
Yuan Sijun (CHN)	5
Stephen Maguire (SCO) (9)	5
Dominic Dale (WAL)	1
Pang Junxu (CHN)	5
Dean Young (SCO)	1
Zhao Xintong (CHN) (25)	5
Stuart Carrington (ENG)	3
Chang Bingyu (CHN)	5
Peter Lines (ENG)	2
Mark Williams (WAL) (8)	5
Oliver Lines (ENG)	1
Kyren Wilson (ENG) (5)	5
Xu Si (CHN)	1
Iulian Boiko (UKR)	2
Li Hang (CHN)	5
Gary Wilson (ENG) (28)	5
Ian Burns (ENG)	0
Jimmy Robertson (ENG)	5
Martin O'Donnell (ENG)	2
Barry Hawkins (ENG) (12)	5
Matthew Selt (ENG)	3
Michael Georgiou (CYP)	5
Scott Donaldson (SCO)	0
Joe Perry (ENG) (21)	3
Zhang Jiankang (CHN)	5
Craig Steadman (ENG)	5
Ng On-yee (HKG)	4
Ben Woollaston (ENG)	2
Zhang Anda (CHN)	5
Graeme Dott (SCO) (20)	4
Si Jiahui (CHN)	5
Jamie Wilson (ENG)	1
Wu Yize (CHN)	5
Stuart Bingham (ENG) (13)	1
Luca Brecel (BEL)	5
Simon Lichtenberg (GER)	5
Sanderson Lam (ENG)	1
Ricky Walden (ENG) (29)	5
Jackson Page (WAL)	2
Jordan Brown (NIR)	4
Michael White (WAL)	5
Neil Robertson (AUS) (4)	5
Fraser Patrick (SCO)	2

Round 2 Best of 9 frames
(England) Judd Trump (1)	5
(England) Anthony Hamilton	3
(China) Xiao Guodong (32)	4
(China) Gao Yang	5
(Scotland) Anthony McGill (16)	5
(England) Jamie O'Neill	2
(China) Zhou Yuelong (17)	5
(England) Zak Surety	3
(England) Allan Taylor	1
(England) Tom Ford (24)	5
(China) Yuan Sijun	1
(Scotland) Stephen Maguire (9)	5
(China) Pang Junxu	3
(China) Zhao Xintong (25)	5
(China) Chang Bingyu	1
(Wales) Mark Williams (8)	5
(England) Kyren Wilson (5)	5
(China) Li Hang	4
(England) Gary Wilson (28)	2
(England) Jimmy Robertson	5
(England) Barry Hawkins (12)	3
(Cyprus) Michael Georgiou	5
(China) Zhang Jiankang	2
(England) Craig Steadman	5
(China) Zhang Anda	5
(China) Si Jiahui	0
(China) Wu Yize	1
(Belgium) Luca Brecel	5
(Germany) Simon Lichtenberg	1
(England) Ricky Walden (29)	5
(Wales) Michael White	2
(Australia) Neil Robertson (4)	5

Round 1 Best of 9 frames
Ronnie O'Sullivan (ENG) (3)	0
Hossein Vafaei (IRN)	5
Steven Hallworth (ENG)	1
Andrew Higginson (ENG)	5
Liang Wenbo (CHN) (30)	5
Reanne Evans (ENG)	1
Fergal O'Brien (IRL)	3
Ben Hancorn (ENG)	5
Jack Lisowski (ENG) (14)	5
Andrew Pagett (WAL)	3
Farakh Ajaib (PAK)	0
Liam Highfield (ENG)	5
Thepchaiya Un-Nooh (THA) (19)	3
Fan Zhengyi (CHN)	5
Rory McLeod (JAM)	0
Lu Ning (CHN)	5
Lee Walker (WAL)	2
Lyu Haotian (CHN)	5
Ali Carter (ENG) (22)	5
Robert Milkins (ENG)	3
Sunny Akani (THA)	5
Michael Judge (IRL)	3
Mark Allen (NIR) (11)	5
Alfie Burden (ENG)	1
David Lilley (ENG)	5
Mitchell Mann (ENG)	1
Kurt Maflin (NOR) (27)	5
Andy Hicks (ENG)	2
Cao Yupeng (CHN)	5
Robbie Williams (ENG)	2
Shaun Murphy (ENG) (6)	5
Mark King (ENG)	1
John Higgins (SCO) (7)	2
Noppon Saengkham (THA)	5
Alexander Ursenbacher (SUI)	4
Jak Jones (WAL)	5
Ryan Day (WAL) (26)	5
Jimmy White (ENG)	4
Nigel Bond (ENG)	2
Jamie Clarke (WAL)	5
Ding Junhui (CHN) (10)	4
Mark Davis (ENG)	5
Gerard Greene (NIR)	2
Sam Craigie (ENG)	5
Martin Gould (ENG) (23)	4
Matthew Stevens (WAL)	5
Chris Wakelin (ENG)	4
Ken Doherty (IRL)	5
Elliot Slessor (ENG)	2
Zhao Jianbo (CHN)	5
David Gilbert (ENG) (18)	5
David Grace (ENG)	4
Lei Peifan (CHN)	5
Soheil Vahedi (IRN)	3
Yan Bingtao (CHN) (15)	5
Chen Zifan (CHN)	2
Jamie Jones (WAL)	4
Barry Pinches (ENG)	5
Michael Holt (ENG) (31)	3
John Astley (ENG)	5
Sean Maddocks (ENG)	2
Ashley Carty (ENG)	5
Mark Selby (ENG) (2)	5
Ross Muir (SCO)	2

Round 2 Best of 9 frames
(Iran) Hossein Vafaei	3
(England) Andrew Higginson	5
(China) Liang Wenbo (30)	5
(England) Ben Hancorn	2
(England) Jack Lisowski (14)	3
(England) Liam Highfield	5
(China) Fan Zhengyi	5
(China) Lu Ning	4
(China) Lyu Haotian	5
(England) Ali Carter (22)	1
(Thailand) Sunny Akani	3
(Northern Ireland) Mark Allen (11)	5
(England) David Lilley	3
(Norway) Kurt Maflin (27)	5
(China) Cao Yupeng	4
(England) Shaun Murphy (6)	5
(Thailand) Noppon Saengkham	5
(Wales) Jak Jones	4
(Wales) Ryan Day (26)	5
(Wales) Jamie Clarke	3
(England) Mark Davis	1
(England) Sam Craigie	5
(Wales) Matthew Stevens	3
(Republic of Ireland) Ken Doherty	5
(China) Zhao Jianbo	2
(England) David Gilbert (18)	5
(China) Lei Peifan	2
(China) Yan Bingtao (15)	5
(England) Barry Pinches	5
(England) John Astley	1
(England) Ashley Carty	1
(England) Mark Selby (2)	5

== Century breaks ==
=== Main stage centuries ===
Total: 29

- 136, 108 – Sam Craigie
- 135 – Stephen Maguire
- 134, 104 – Fan Zhengyi
- 130 – Craig Steadman
- 130 – Judd Trump
- 129, 120 – Luca Brecel
- 124, 105 – Ricky Walden
- 124 – Shaun Murphy
- 122 – Kurt Maflin
- 119 – Mark Selby
- 118, 116, 107, 106, 104 – Mark Allen
- 118, 100 – Zhao Xintong
- 117, 107 – Kyren Wilson
- 116 – Yan Bingtao
- 112 – Michael Georgiou
- 104, 102 – Tom Ford
- 104 – Liam Highfield
- 102 – Ryan Day
- 101 – Noppon Saengkham

=== Qualifying stage centuries ===
Total: 74

- 147 – Thepchaiya Un-Nooh
- 143 – Peter Devlin
- 141, 136, 123, 114 – Zhao Xintong
- 141 – Alfie Burden
- 141 – Hossein Vafaei
- 140 – Joe O'Connor
- 140 – Zhang Anda
- 138 – Michael Georgiou
- 138 – John Higgins
- 136 – Lu Ning
- 135, 134, 103 – Neil Robertson
- 134, 112 – Mark Selby
- 133, 122, 120 – Mark Allen
- 133, 104 – Gary Wilson
- 133 – Fan Zhengyi
- 132, 105, 105 – Noppon Saengkham
- 130 – Anthony Hamilton
- 128, 108 – Cao Yupeng
- 128, 103 – Mark Williams
- 125 – Li Hang
- 125 – Matthew Selt
- 123, 104, 104 – Kyren Wilson
- 122, 102 – Wu Yize
- 119, 104 – Barry Hawkins
- 119 – Mark Davis
- 118, 102, 100 – Shaun Murphy
- 118 – Yan Bingtao
- 113, 105 – Ashley Hugill
- 113, 104 – Jamie Jones
- 113 – Hammad Miah
- 113 – Barry Pinches
- 112, 101 – Alexander Ursenbacher
- 111 – Chang Bingyu
- 110, 104 – Jack Lisowski
- 110 – Jamie Clarke
- 109 – Graeme Dott
- 109 – Michael White
- 108, 103 – Jak Jones
- 108 – Anthony McGill
- 107, 107, 102 – Ricky Walden
- 104 – Pang Junxu
- 103, 100 – Yuan Sijun
- 102 – Zhou Yuelong
- 101 – Sunny Akani
- 101 – Lyu Haotian
- 100, 100 – Judd Trump
