= 2021 Scottish Open (snooker) =

2021 BetVictor Scottish Open
Tournament information
- Dates: 6–12 December 2021
- Venue: Venue Cymru
- City: Llandudno
- Country: Wales
- Organisation: World Snooker Tour
- Format: Ranking event
- Total prize fund: £405,000
- Winner's share: £70,000
- Highest break: Xiao Guodong (CHN) (147)

Final
- Champion: Luca Brecel (BEL)
- Runner-up: John Higgins (SCO)
- Score: 9–5

The 2021 Scottish Open (officially the 2021 BetVictor Scottish Open) was a professional snooker tournament that was played from 6 to 12 December 2021 at Venue Cymru in Llandudno, Wales. It was the sixth ranking event of the 2021–22 season, and the third tournament in the Home Nations Series, following the Northern Ireland Open and English Open, and preceding the Welsh Open. It was also the third of eight tournaments in the season's European Series. The tournament was sponsored by BetVictor and broadcast by Eurosport in the UK and Europe.

The day before tickets were due to go on sale, the Emirates Arena in Glasgow informed the World Snooker Tour that the venue would not host an event sponsored by a betting company. Unable to find a suitable replacement venue in Scotland, the organisers moved the event to Wales. The qualifying stage of the tournament took place from 24 to 29 September 2021 at the Metrodome in Barnsley, England, although qualifying matches involving top-16 players and two wildcard entrants from the home nation were held over and played at Venue Cymru. In his first-round match against Lee Walker, Jimmy Robertson scored 178 points in a single frame, including 44 points in fouls, breaking the previous professional record of 167 set by Dominic Dale at the 1999 World Championship.

Mark Selby was the defending champion, having won the event in 2019 and 2020. By reaching the fourth round, Selby won 17 consecutive Scottish Open matches before he was defeated 3–4 by Anthony McGill. Luca Brecel, who had been runner-up at the UK Championship a week earlier, defeated John Higgins 9–5 in the final to claim the second ranking title of his career. Higgins lost his fourth consecutive final of the season, as well as his third consecutive Home Nations final. The highest break of the tournament was by Xiao Guodong, who made the first maximum break of his career in his qualifying round match against Fraser Patrick.

== Prize fund ==
The breakdown of prize money for the event is shown below:

- Winner: £70,000
- Runner-up: £30,000
- Semi-final: £20,000
- Quarter-final: £10,000
- Last 16: £7,500
- Last 32: £4,000
- Last 64: £3,000
- Highest break: £5,000
- Total: £405,000

== Main draw ==
=== Top half ===
Last 64; Best of 7 frames
Mark Selby (ENG) (1)	4
Oliver Lines (ENG)	1
Xiao Guodong (CHN) (32)	4
Duane Jones (WAL)	2
Anthony McGill (SCO) (16)	4
Chris Wakelin (ENG)	1
Lee Walker (WAL)	1
Jimmy Robertson (ENG)	4
Mark Davis (ENG)	1
Tom Ford (ENG) (24)	4
Sunny Akani (THA)	1
Stephen Maguire (SCO) (9)	4
Robbie Williams (ENG)	2
Lei Peifan (CHN)	4
Sanderson Lam (ENG)	0
Ben Woollaston (ENG)	4
Kyren Wilson (ENG) (5)	1
Fergal O'Brien (IRL)	4
Gary Wilson (ENG) (28)	4
Anthony Hamilton (ENG)	1
Pang Junxu (CHN)	4
Iulian Boiko (UKR)	2
Joe Perry (ENG) (21)	2
Luca Brecel (BEL)	4
Jackson Page (WAL)	4
Michael Judge (IRL)	3
Matthew Selt (ENG)	4
Andrew Higginson (ENG)	0
Scott Donaldson (SCO)	4
Steven Hallworth (ENG)	3
Si Jiahui (CHN)	1
Ben Hancorn (ENG)	4

Last 32; Best of 7 frames
(England) Mark Selby (1)	4
(China) Xiao Guodong (32)	2
(Scotland) Anthony McGill (16)	4
(England) Jimmy Robertson	3
(England) Tom Ford (24)	0
(Scotland) Stephen Maguire (9)	4
(China) Lei Peifan	1
(England) Ben Woollaston	4
(Republic of Ireland) Fergal O'Brien	4
(England) Gary Wilson (28)	1
(China) Pang Junxu	3
(Belgium) Luca Brecel	4
(Wales) Jackson Page	3
(England) Matthew Selt	4
(Scotland) Scott Donaldson	4
(England) Ben Hancorn	2

Last 16; Best of 7 frames
(England) Mark Selby (1)	3
(Scotland) Anthony McGill (16)	4
(Scotland) Stephen Maguire (9)	4
(England) Ben Woollaston	1
(Republic of Ireland) Fergal O'Brien	1
(Belgium) Luca Brecel	4
(England) Matthew Selt	4
(Scotland) Scott Donaldson	2

Quarter-finals; Best of 9 frames
(Scotland) Anthony McGill (16)	5
(Scotland) Stephen Maguire (9)	3
(Belgium) Luca Brecel	5
(England) Matthew Selt	4

Semi-finals; Best of 11 frames
(Scotland) Anthony McGill (16)	1
(Belgium) Luca Brecel	6

=== Bottom half ===
Last 64; Best of 7 frames
Ronnie O'Sullivan (ENG) (3)	4
Michael Georgiou (CYP)	0
Liang Wenbo (CHN) (30)	4
Allan Taylor (ENG)	0
Stuart Carrington (ENG)	0
Jamie Jones (WAL)	4
Sam Craigie (ENG)	4
Zhao Jianbo (CHN)	2
Xu Si (CHN)	4
Ken Doherty (IRL)	2
Mark King (ENG)	2
Martin O'Donnell (ENG)	4
Hossein Vafaei (IRN)	4
Wu Yize (CHN)	3
Li Hang (CHN)	4
Shaun Murphy (ENG) (6)	2
John Higgins (SCO) (7)	4
Noppon Saengkham (THA)	1
Ryan Day (WAL) (26)	4
Gao Yang (CHN)	0
Zhang Anda (CHN)	4
Mitchell Mann (ENG)	1
Martin Gould (ENG) (23)	4
Jordan Brown (NIR)	3
Chang Bingyu (CHN)	2
David Gilbert (ENG) (18)	4
Hammad Miah (ENG)	4
Yan Bingtao (CHN) (15)	1
David Lilley (ENG)	w/o
Michael Holt (ENG) (31)	w/d
Craig Steadman (ENG)	0
Judd Trump (ENG) (2)	4

Last 32; Best of 7 frames
(England) Ronnie O'Sullivan (3)	4
(China) Liang Wenbo (30)	3
(Wales) Jamie Jones	4
(England) Sam Craigie	3
(China) Xu Si	3
(England) Martin O'Donnell	4
(Iran) Hossein Vafaei	3
(China) Li Hang	4
(Scotland) John Higgins (7)	4
(Wales) Ryan Day (26)	0
(China) Zhang Anda	2
(England) Martin Gould (23)	4
(England) David Gilbert (18)	4
(England) Hammad Miah	0
(England) David Lilley	0
(England) Judd Trump (2)	4

Last 16; Best of 7 frames
(England) Ronnie O'Sullivan (3)	4
(Wales) Jamie Jones	3
(England) Martin O'Donnell	2
(China) Li Hang	4
(Scotland) John Higgins (7)	4
(England) Martin Gould (23)	2
(England) David Gilbert (18)	4
(England) Judd Trump (2)	3

Quarter-finals; Best of 9 frames
(England) Ronnie O'Sullivan (3)	5
(China) Li Hang	4
(Scotland) John Higgins (7)	5
(England) David Gilbert (18)	3

Semi-finals; Best of 11 frames
(England) Ronnie O'Sullivan (3)	1
(Scotland) John Higgins (7)	6

=== Final ===
Final: Best of 17 frames. Referee: Colin Humphries; Venue Cymru, Llandudno, Wales, 12 December 2021.
Luca Brecel; Belgium	9–5	John Higgins (7); Scotland
Afternoon: 71–33, 96–0, 61–8, 0–91, 69–21, 59–56, 46–75, 104–0 (104); Evening: 79–27, 98–0, 5–97, 17–73, 25–62, 127–0 (127)
127	Highest break	73
2	Century breaks	0

== Qualifying ==
Qualification for the tournament took place from 24 to 29 September 2021 at the Metrodome in Barnsley, but the matches which involve top 16 players and the two wild card players were played at Venue Cymru. Zhou Yuelong was due to take part in this event, but withdrew and was replaced by John Astley. Ahead of the final stages, Neil Robertson and Mark Williams withdrew, and were replaced by Bai Langning and James Cahill respectively.

- Mark Selby (ENG) (1) 4–1 Sean Maddocks (ENG) (Note: Match was held over and played in Llandudno.)
- Gerard Greene (NIR) 1–4 Oliver Lines (ENG)
- Xiao Guodong (CHN) 4–3 Fraser Patrick (SCO)
- Duane Jones (WAL) 4–2 Ian Burns (ENG)
- Anthony McGill (SCO) 4–2 Jamie Wilson (ENG)
- Chris Wakelin (ENG) 4–0 Mark Joyce (ENG)
- John Astley (ENG) 1–4 Lee Walker (WAL)
- Jamie O'Neill (ENG) 1–4 Jimmy Robertson (ENG)
- Mark Davis (ENG) 4–3 Michael White (WAL)
- Tom Ford (ENG) 4–2 Peter Lines (ENG)
- Sunny Akani (THA) 4–0 Lukas Kleckers (GER)
- Stephen Maguire (SCO) (9) 4–3 Yuan Sijun (CHN)
- Soheil Vahedi (IRN) 2–4 Robbie Williams (ENG)
- Zhao Xintong (CHN) 2–4 Lei Peifan (CHN)
- Sanderson Lam (ENG) 4–3 Jamie Clarke (WAL)
- James Cahill (ENG) 0–4 Ben Woollaston (ENG)
- Kyren Wilson (ENG) (5) 4–0 Andy Hicks (ENG)
- Fergal O'Brien (IRL) 4–2 David Grace (ENG)
- Gary Wilson (ENG) 4–1 Cao Yupeng (CHN)
- Tian Pengfei (CHN) 1–4 Anthony Hamilton (ENG)
- Barry Hawkins (ENG) 0–4 Pang Junxu (CHN)
- Louis Heathcote (ENG) 2–4 Iulian Boiko (UKR)
- Joe Perry (ENG) 4–1 Andrew Pagett (WAL)
- Luca Brecel (BEL) 4–1 Alexander Ursenbacher (SUI)
- Jackson Page (WAL) 4–2 Aaron Hill (IRL)
- Graeme Dott (SCO) 1–4 Michael Judge (IRL)
- Ashley Hugill (ENG) 3–4 Matthew Selt (ENG)
- Stuart Bingham (ENG) 1–4 Andrew Higginson (ENG)
- Scott Donaldson (SCO) 4–2 Jak Jones (WAL)
- Ricky Walden (ENG) 3–4 Steven Hallworth (ENG)
- Matthew Stevens (WAL) 1–4 Si Jiahui (CHN)
- Bai Langning (CHN) 2–4 Ben Hancorn (ENG)
- Ronnie O'Sullivan (ENG) (3) 4–2 Dominic Dale (WAL)
- Farakh Ajaib (PAK) 0–4 Michael Georgiou (CYP)
- Liang Wenbo (CHN) 4–3 Elliot Slessor (ENG)
- Stephen Hendry (SCO) 0–4 Allan Taylor (ENG)
- Jack Lisowski (ENG) 1–4 Stuart Carrington (ENG)
- Joe O'Connor (ENG) 2–4 Jamie Jones (WAL)
- Thepchaiya Un-Nooh (THA) 2–4 Sam Craigie (ENG)
- Liam Highfield (ENG) 0–4 Zhao Jianbo (CHN)
- Lu Ning (CHN) 1–4 Xu Si (CHN)
- Ali Carter (ENG) 3–4 Ken Doherty (IRL)
- Mark King (ENG) 4–3 Rory McLeod (JAM)
- Mark Allen (NIR) 3–4 Martin O'Donnell (ENG)
- Hossein Vafaei (IRN) 4–2 Fan Zhengyi (CHN)
- Kurt Maflin (NOR) 2–4 Wu Yize (CHN)
- Li Hang (CHN) 4–0 Nigel Bond (ENG)
- Shaun Murphy (ENG) (6) 4–3 Ng On-yee (HKG)
- John Higgins (SCO) (7) 4–1 Alfie Burden (ENG)
- Amman Iqbal (SCO) 1–4 Noppon Saengkham (THA)
- Ryan Day (WAL) 4–3 Lyu Haotian (CHN)
- Gao Yang (CHN) 4–1 Peter Devlin (ENG)
- Ding Junhui (CHN) 3–4 Zhang Anda (CHN)
- Mitchell Mann (ENG) 4–2 Reanne Evans (ENG)
- Martin Gould (ENG) 4–2 Zhang Jiankang (CHN)
- Barry Pinches (ENG) 1–4 Jordan Brown (NIR)
- Jimmy White (ENG) 1–4 Chang Bingyu (CHN)
- David Gilbert (ENG) 4–1 Simon Lichtenberg (GER)
- Ashley Carty (ENG) 3–4 Hammad Miah (ENG)
- Yan Bingtao (CHN) 4–0 Zak Surety (ENG)
- David Lilley (ENG) 4–0 Dean Young (SCO)
- Michael Holt (ENG) 4–3 Liam Graham (SCO)
- Chen Zifan (CHN) 2–4 Craig Steadman (ENG)
- Judd Trump (ENG) (2) 4–0 Robert Milkins (ENG)

== Century breaks ==
=== Main stage centuries ===
Total: 39

- 140 – Fergal O'Brien
- 139, 125 – John Higgins
- 135 – Martin O'Donnell
- 133, 118 – Jimmy Robertson
- 131 – Jamie Jones
- 131 – Ronnie O'Sullivan
- 130, 130, 113, 106 – David Gilbert
- 128, 115 – Liang Wenbo
- 127, 104 – Luca Brecel
- 127 – Pang Junxu
- 125 – Gary Wilson
- 120 – Ryan Day
- 117 – Jordan Brown
- 117 – Xiao Guodong
- 116, 107, 105 – Mark Selby
- 116 – Li Hang
- 113, 110 – Anthony McGill
- 113, 109, 105, 104 – Judd Trump
- 111 – Zhao Jianbo
- 108 – Sam Craigie
- 107 – Sunny Akani
- 107 – Steven Hallworth
- 104 – Lei Peifan
- 103 – Hossein Vafaei
- 101 – Scott Donaldson
- 101 – Matthew Selt

=== Qualifying stage centuries ===
Total: 36

- 147, 108 – Xiao Guodong
- 135, 100 – Mark Selby
- 133, 100 – Michael Judge
- 133 – Fan Zhengyi
- 132 – Jack Lisowski
- 132 – Ronnie O'Sullivan
- 131, 113 – David Gilbert
- 130, 107 – Kyren Wilson
- 130 – Shaun Murphy
- 130 – Robbie Williams
- 126 – Jackson Page
- 125 – Michael Georgiou
- 121 – Ricky Walden
- 118, 115 – Noppon Saengkham
- 116 – Oliver Lines
- 116 – Kurt Maflin
- 115 – Tom Ford
- 114 – Elliot Slessor
- 112 – Zhang Anda
- 109 – Thepchaiya Un-Nooh
- 109 – Chang Bingyu
- 107 – Mark Allen
- 107 – Stephen Maguire
- 105 – Si Jiahui
- 104 – Martin Gould
- 103 – Jak Jones
- 102 – Michael Holt
- 102 – David Lilley
- 100 – Mitchell Mann
- 100 – Judd Trump
