= 2022 European Masters (2021–22 season) =

Snooker tournament held in February 2022

2022 BetVictor European Masters
Tournament information
- Dates: 21–27 February 2022
- Venue: Marshall Arena
- City: Milton Keynes
- Country: England
- Organisation: World Snooker Tour
- Format: Ranking event
- Total prize fund: £407,000
- Winner's share: £80,000
- Highest break: Thepchaiya Un-Nooh (THA) (144)

Final
- Champion: Fan Zhengyi (CHN)
- Runner-up: Ronnie O'Sullivan (ENG)
- Score: 10–9

The 2022 European Masters (officially the 2022 BetVictor European Masters) was a professional ranking snooker tournament that took place from 21 to 27 February 2022 at the Marshall Arena in Milton Keynes, England. The tournament was the 11th ranking event of the 2021–22 season and the sixth of eight tournaments in the season's European Series. The World Snooker Tour originally planned to stage the event at the Stadthalle Fürth in Fürth, Germany, but relocated it to the UK after increasing rates of COVID-19 in Bavaria led to greater restrictions around sporting events. The tournament was broadcast by Eurosport in Europe, and by other networks worldwide.

Mark Selby was the defending champion, having defeated Martin Gould 9–8 in the final of the tournament's September 2020 edition. However, Selby lost 3–5 to Jordan Brown in the round of 64. Many other top seeds also suffered early exits, with only three top-16 players reaching the round of 16. World number 80 Fan Zhengyi reached his first ranking final by defeating higher-ranked opponents Kyren Wilson, Yan Bingtao, David Gilbert, and Graeme Dott. Six-time world champion Ronnie O'Sullivan reached the 60th ranking final of his career.

The best-of-19-frame final between O'Sullivan and Fan was played over two sessions on 27 February. O'Sullivan fell two frames behind at 2–4, 4–6, and 6–8, but drew level each time. Fan took a 9–8 lead, but O'Sullivan again drew level to force a deciding frame. After O'Sullivan missed a long red in the decider, Fan made a 92 break to win the match 10–9 and capture his first ranking title. He became the fifth Chinese player to win a ranking event, after Ding Junhui, Liang Wenbo, Yan, and Zhao Xintong, as well as the fourth player to win a maiden ranking title in the 2021–22 season, following David Gilbert, Zhao, and Hossein Vafaei. His £80,000 prize money for winning the tournament took him from 80th to 31st in the world rankings.

Thepchaiya Un-Nooh made the highest break of the tournament, a 144, during his qualifying match against Chen Zifan. Neil Robertson compiled a record-equalling four consecutive centuries in his last-64 match against Alfie Burden, becoming the first player to accomplish this feat twice in professional competition. He previously made four consecutive centuries against Ahmed Saif at a European Tour event in 2013.

== Prize fund ==
The breakdown of prize money for this event is shown below:

- Winner: £80,000
- Runner-up: £35,000
- Semi-final: £17,500
- Quarter-final: £11,000
- Last 16: £6,000
- Last 32: £4,000
- Last 64: £3,000
- Highest break: £5,000
- Total: £407,000

== Main draw ==
=== Top half ===
Last 64; Best of 9 frames
(England) Mark Selby (1)	3
(Northern Ireland) Jordan Brown	5
(China) Xiao Guodong (32)	5
(England) Andy Hicks	2
(China) Zhou Yuelong (16)	5
(China) Gao Yang	1
(Scotland) Graeme Dott (17)	5
(England) Mark Davis	4
(Belgium) Luca Brecel	5
(England) Gary Wilson (24)	3
(Wales) Jackson Page	3
(Thailand) Sunny Akani	5
(England) Jamie O'Neill	1
(Wales) Ryan Day (25)	5
(Iran) Soheil Vahedi	2
(England) Ashley Carty	5
(England) Kyren Wilson (5)	5
(Wales) Jamie Jones	2
(Republic of Ireland) Aaron Hill	3
(China) Fan Zhengyi	5
(China) Yan Bingtao (12)	5
(China) Li Hang	1
(England) Joe Perry (21)	5
(China) Cao Yupeng	2
(England) Liam Highfield	4
(England) David Gilbert (20)	5
(England) Anthony Hamilton	3
(England) Barry Hawkins (13)	5
(China) Xu Si	4
(China) Pang Junxu	5
(England) Alfie Burden	0
(Australia) Neil Robertson (4)	5

Last 32; Best of 9 frames
(Northern Ireland) Jordan Brown	5
(China) Xiao Guodong (32)	0
(China) Zhou Yuelong (16)	4
(Scotland) Graeme Dott (17)	5
(Belgium) Luca Brecel	4
(Thailand) Sunny Akani	5
(Wales) Ryan Day (25)	5
(England) Ashley Carty	4
(England) Kyren Wilson (5)	4
(China) Fan Zhengyi	5
(China) Yan Bingtao (12)	5
(England) Joe Perry (21)	2
(England) David Gilbert (20)	5
(England) Barry Hawkins (13)	4
(China) Pang Junxu	5
(Australia) Neil Robertson (4)	4

Last 16; Best of 9 frames
(Northern Ireland) Jordan Brown	2
(Scotland) Graeme Dott (17)	5
(Thailand) Sunny Akani	2
(Wales) Ryan Day (25)	5
(China) Fan Zhengyi	5
(China) Yan Bingtao (12)	3
(England) David Gilbert (20)	5
(China) Pang Junxu	3

Quarter-finals; Best of 9 frames
(Scotland) Graeme Dott (17)	5
(Wales) Ryan Day (25)	4
(China) Fan Zhengyi	5
(England) David Gilbert (20)	3

Semi-finals; Best of 11 frames
(Scotland) Graeme Dott (17)	4
(China) Fan Zhengyi	6

=== Bottom half ===
Last 64; Best of 9 frames
(England) Ronnie O'Sullivan (3)	5
(China) Zhang Anda	4
(China) Wu Yize	5
(Republic of Ireland) Fergal O'Brien	3
(England) Jack Lisowski (14)	3
(England) Ashley Hugill	5
(England) Ali Carter (19)	5
(England) Sean Maddocks	1
(England) Louis Heathcote	3
(England) Martin Gould (22)	5
(China) Zhang Jiankang	3
(Scotland) Fraser Patrick	5
(England) Ian Burns	3
(England) Tom Ford (27)	5
(Wales) Jamie Clarke	1
(Scotland) John Higgins (6)	5
(England) Shaun Murphy (7)	3
(Thailand) Noppon Saengkham	5
(China) Liang Wenbo (26)	5
(Wales) Duane Jones	4
(China) Yuan Sijun	5
(England) Stuart Carrington	4
(England) Ricky Walden (23)	5
(Wales) Matthew Stevens	1
(England) Mitchell Mann	5
(Thailand) Thepchaiya Un-Nooh (18)	0
(Iran) Hossein Vafaei	0
(Scotland) Anthony McGill (15)	5
(England) Andrew Higginson	4
(Norway) Kurt Maflin (31)	5
(Wales) Jak Jones	4
(England) Judd Trump (2)	5

Last 32; Best of 9 frames
(England) Ronnie O'Sullivan (3)	5
(China) Wu Yize	1
(England) Ashley Hugill	5
(England) Ali Carter (19)	1
(England) Martin Gould (22)	4
(Scotland) Fraser Patrick	5
(England) Tom Ford (27)	5
(Scotland) John Higgins (6)	0
(Thailand) Noppon Saengkham	0
(China) Liang Wenbo (26)	5
(China) Yuan Sijun	5
(England) Ricky Walden (23)	2
(England) Mitchell Mann	1
(Scotland) Anthony McGill (15)	5
(Norway) Kurt Maflin (31)	5
(England) Judd Trump (2)	3

Last 16; Best of 9 frames
(England) Ronnie O'Sullivan (3)	5
(England) Ashley Hugill	2
(Scotland) Fraser Patrick	3
(England) Tom Ford (27)	5
(China) Liang Wenbo (26)	5
(China) Yuan Sijun	2
(Scotland) Anthony McGill (15)	5
(Norway) Kurt Maflin (31)	3

Quarter-finals; Best of 9 frames
(England) Ronnie O'Sullivan (3)	5
(England) Tom Ford (27)	1
(China) Liang Wenbo (26)	5
(Scotland) Anthony McGill (15)	4

Semi-finals; Best of 11 frames
(England) Ronnie O'Sullivan (3)	6
(China) Liang Wenbo (26)	2

=== Final ===
Final: Best of 19 frames. Referee: Leo Scullion; Marshall Arena, Milton Keynes, England, 27 February 2022
Fan Zhengyi; China	10–9	Ronnie O'Sullivan (3); England
Afternoon: 6–66, 68–1, 77–46, 1–66, 81–0, 78–28, 38–72, 0–83; Evening: 135–0 (135), 110–21 (110), 14–88, 36–69, 65–51, 74–31, 0–107 (107), 37–80, 82–0, 23–90, 92–0
135	Highest break	107
2	Century breaks	1

== Qualifying ==
Qualifying for the event took place between 27 and 31 October 2021 at the Chase Leisure Centre in Cannock, England. Qualifying matches involving the top four ranked players were held over to be played at the Marshall Arena in Milton Keynes.

Mark Williams was due to take part in qualifying, but withdrew from the event due to a positive COVID-19 test and was replaced by Mark Lloyd. Sam Craigie withdrew due to injury, and his place in the draw was taken by James Cahill. However, Cahill immediately had to withdraw after producing a positive COVID-19 test. As no other players were available to be entered at short notice, Soheil Vahedi received a bye. Michael White also withdrew and was replaced by Simon Blackwell.

- Mark Selby (ENG) (1) 5–3 Matthew Selt (ENG) (Note: Match held over and played in Milton Keynes.)
- Jordan Brown (NIR) 5–2 Alexander Ursenbacher (SUI)
- Xiao Guodong (CHN) 5–0 Lukas Kleckers (GER)
- Craig Steadman (ENG) 4–5 Andy Hicks (ENG)
- Zhou Yuelong (CHN) 5–2 Jimmy White (ENG)
- David Lilley (ENG) 2–5 Gao Yang (CHN)
- Graeme Dott (SCO) 5–3 Scott Donaldson (SCO)
- Mark Davis (ENG) 5–3 Robert Milkins (ENG)
- Luca Brecel (BEL) 5–1 Barry Pinches (ENG)
- Gary Wilson (ENG) 5–1 Sanderson Lam (ENG)
- David Grace (ENG) 3–5 Jackson Page (WAL)
- Mark Allen (NIR) (9) 4–5 Sunny Akani (THA)
- Jamie O'Neill (ENG) 5–1 Hammad Miah (ENG)
- Ryan Day (WAL) 5–2 Dominic Dale (WAL)
- James Cahill (ENG) w/d–w/o Soheil Vahedi (IRN)
- Stephen Maguire (SCO) (8) 1–5 Ashley Carty (ENG)
- Kyren Wilson (ENG) (5) 5–2 Lyu Haotian (CHN)
- Jamie Jones (WAL) 5–4 Tian Pengfei (CHN)
- Zhao Xintong (CHN) 4–5 Aaron Hill (IRL)
- Fan Zhengyi (CHN) 5–3 Rory McLeod (JAM)
- Yan Bingtao (CHN) 5–2 Ben Woollaston (ENG)
- Stephen Hendry (SCO) 3–5 Li Hang (CHN)
- Joe Perry (ENG) 5–4 Steven Hallworth (ENG)
- Cao Yupeng (CHN) 5–3 Michael Georgiou (CYP)
- Chang Bingyu (CHN) 0–5 Liam Highfield (ENG)
- David Gilbert (ENG) 5–4 Jimmy Robertson (ENG)
- Anthony Hamilton (ENG) 5–3 Mark King (ENG)
- Barry Hawkins (ENG) 5–0 Iulian Boiko (UKR)
- Xu Si (CHN) 5–1 Lee Walker (WAL)
- Lu Ning (CHN) 4–5 Pang Junxu (CHN)
- Alfie Burden (ENG) 5–0 Peter Lines (ENG)
- Neil Robertson (AUS) (4) 5–2 Lei Peifan (CHN)
- Ronnie O'Sullivan (ENG) (3) 5–1 Nigel Bond (ENG)
- Andrew Pagett (WAL) 3–5 Zhang Anda (CHN)
- Michael Holt (ENG) 4–5 Wu Yize (CHN)
- Robbie Williams (ENG) 3–5 Fergal O'Brien (IRL)
- Jack Lisowski (ENG) 5–2 Simon Lichtenberg (GER)
- Bai Langning (CHN) 1–5 Ashley Hugill (ENG)
- Ali Carter (ENG) 5–2 Martin O'Donnell (ENG)
- Sean Maddocks (ENG) 5–0 Jamie Wilson (ENG)
- Reanne Evans (ENG) 2–5 Louis Heathcote (ENG)
- Martin Gould (ENG) 5–0 Ng On-yee (HKG)
- Zhang Jiankang (CHN) 5–4 Mark Joyce (ENG)
- Stuart Bingham (ENG) 3–5 Fraser Patrick (SCO)
- Ben Hancorn (ENG) 1–5 Ian Burns (ENG)
- Tom Ford (ENG) 5–3 Ross Muir (SCO)
- Jamie Clarke (WAL) 5–3 Farakh Ajaib (PAK)
- John Higgins (SCO) (6) 5–4 Chris Wakelin (ENG)
- Shaun Murphy (ENG) (7) 5–2 Simon Blackwell (ENG)
- Noppon Saengkham (THA) 5–0 Si Jiahui (CHN)
- Liang Wenbo (CHN) 5–2 Joe O'Connor (ENG)
- Dean Young (SCO) 2–5 Duane Jones (WAL)
- Mark Lloyd (ENG) 4–5 Yuan Sijun (CHN)
- John Astley (ENG) 3–5 Stuart Carrington (ENG)
- Ricky Walden (ENG) 5–4 Elliot Slessor (ENG)
- Zak Surety (ENG) 0–5 Matthew Stevens (WAL)
- Zhao Jianbo (CHN) 4–5 Mitchell Mann (ENG)
- Thepchaiya Un-Nooh (THA) 5–3 Chen Zifan (CHN)
- Peter Devlin (ENG) 0–5 Hossein Vafaei (IRN)
- Anthony McGill (SCO) 5–0 Oliver Lines (ENG)
- Gerard Greene (NIR) 0–5 Andrew Higginson (ENG)
- Kurt Maflin (NOR) 5–2 Allan Taylor (ENG)
- Jak Jones (WAL) 5–2 Ken Doherty (IRL)
- Judd Trump (ENG) (2) 5–0 Michael Judge (IRL)

== Century breaks ==
=== Main stage centuries ===
A total of 60 century breaks were made during the main event.

- 141, 136, 132, 128, 127, 112, 109, 109, 107, 105 – Ronnie O'Sullivan
- 140, 131, 124, 120 – Liang Wenbo
- 135, 131, 125, 117, 110 – Fan Zhengyi
- 134, 134, 124 – Anthony McGill
- 132 – Gary Wilson
- 131 – Jamie Jones
- 130 – Jack Lisowski
- 128, 115 – Jak Jones
- 128 – Mark Selby
- 128 – Xiao Guodong
- 127 – Tom Ford
- 127 – Andrew Higginson
- 124, 100 – Judd Trump
- 122 – Noppon Saengkham
- 118 – Jordan Brown
- 117 – Ryan Day
- 116, 107, 105, 104, 101, 100 – Neil Robertson
- 114 – Ricky Walden
- 114 – Zhang Anda
- 112, 100 – Wu Yize
- 111, 105, 103 – Kurt Maflin
- 111 – Yan Bingtao
- 110, 101 – Pang Junxu
- 109 – Jackson Page
- 105, 100 – David Gilbert
- 102 – Yuan Sijun
- 101, 100 – Kyren Wilson
- 101 – Luca Brecel
- 101 – Stuart Carrington
- 101 – Soheil Vahedi

=== Qualifying stage centuries ===
A total of 40 century breaks were made during the qualifying stage of the tournament.

- 144 – Thepchaiya Un-Nooh
- 141, 131 – Ryan Day
- 141 – Kurt Maflin
- 138 – Mark Davis
- 138 – Jack Lisowski
- 136 – Mark Allen
- 136 – Lu Ning
- 135 – Sunny Akani
- 134, 127 – Shaun Murphy
- 134, 106 – Xu Si
- 134 – Liam Highfield
- 132 – Yuan Sijun
- 131 – Ken Doherty
- 130 – Neil Robertson
- 129 – Elliot Slessor
- 129 – Judd Trump
- 128 – Mark Selby
- 123 – John Higgins
- 122 – Jamie Clarke
- 120 – Mitchell Mann
- 118 – Jordan Brown
- 117 – Graeme Dott
- 115 – Michael Holt
- 113 – Matthew Selt
- 112 – Ashley Hugill
- 112 – Zhang Anda
- 111 – Mark Lloyd
- 110 – Zhao Jianbo
- 108, 104 – Barry Hawkins
- 108 – David Grace
- 104, 100 – David Gilbert
- 102 – Noppon Saengkham
- 101 – Jackson Page
- 101 – Ben Woollaston
