= 2021 German Masters =

Snooker tournament

2021 BildBet German Masters

Tournament information
- Dates: 27–31 January 2021
- Venue: Marshall Arena
- City: Milton Keynes
- Country: England
- Organisation: World Snooker Tour
- Format: Ranking event
- Total prize fund: £400,000
- Winner's share: £80,000
- Highest break: Shaun Murphy (ENG) (147)

Final
- Champion: Judd Trump (ENG)
- Runner-up: Jack Lisowski (ENG)
- Score: 9–2

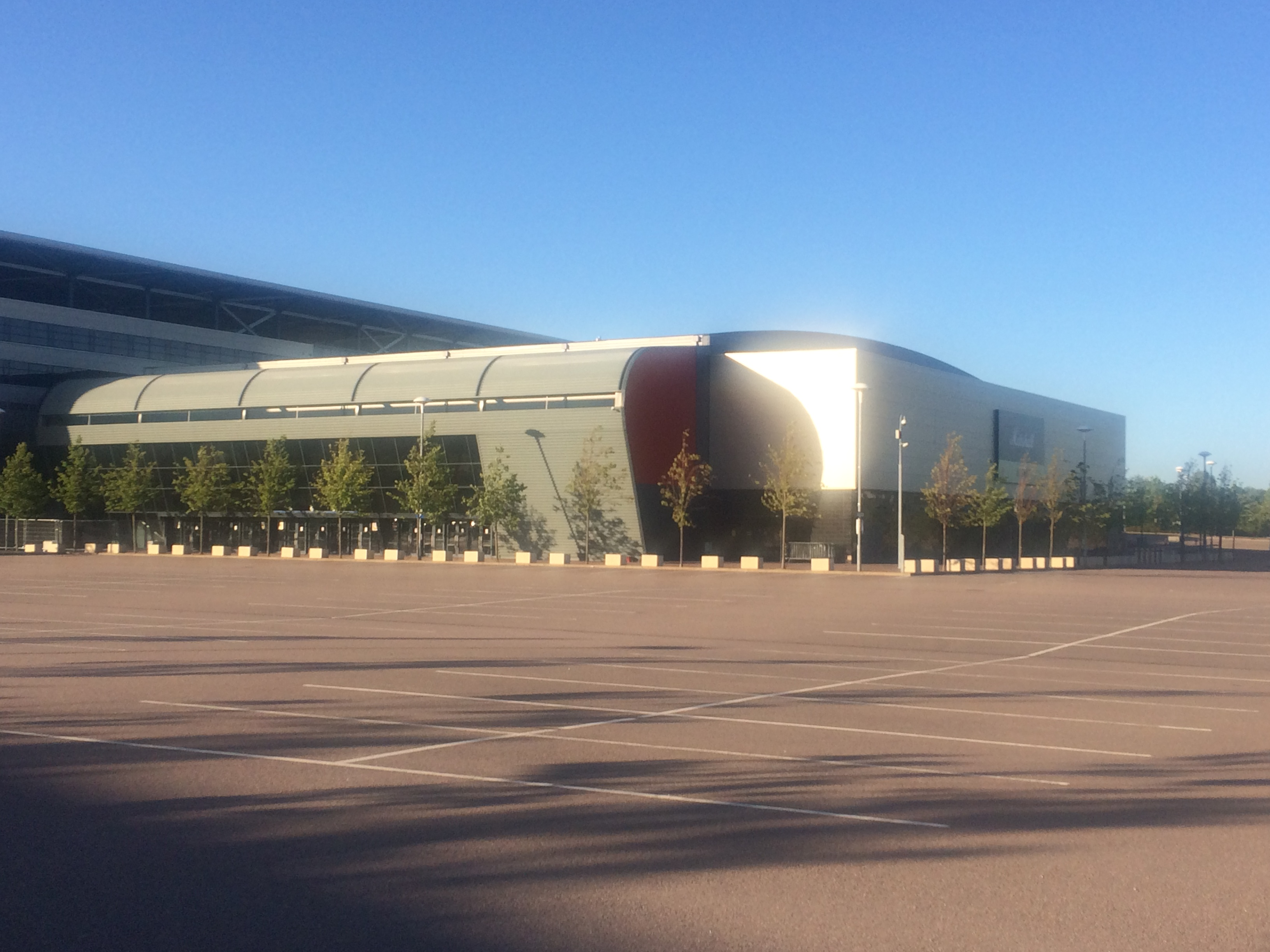
Marshall Arena (Milton Keynes)

The 2021 German Masters (officially the 2021 BildBet German Masters) was a professional ranking snooker tournament that took place from 27 to 31 January 2021. As a result of the COVID-19 pandemic, the tournament was staged at the Marshall Arena in Milton Keynes. The tournament was the eighth ranking event of the 2020–21 snooker season. It was the 15th edition of the German Masters, first held in 1995 as the 1995 German Open. Shaun Murphy made the sixth maximum break of his career in the first qualifying round against Chen Zifan.

The event featured a prize fund of £400,000 with £80,000 given to the winner. It was sponsored for the first time by BildBet, a subsidiary company created by BetVictor in collaboration with the local newspaper Bild. Despite the different name, the tournament was part of the BetVictor European Series.

Judd Trump was the defending champion after defeating Neil Robertson 9–6 in the 2020 final. Trump met Jack Lisowski in the final, a repeat of the previous ranking event final, the World Grand Prix. It was the first time that the same two players had met in successive ranking event finals since John Higgins and Steve Davis met in the Welsh Open and International Open finals at the start of 1995. Trump won by 9 frames to 2, becoming the first player ever to successfully defend the title.

== Prize fund ==
The event featured a total prize fund of £400,000 with the winner receiving £80,000. The event was the third of the "European Series" all sponsored by sports betting company BetVictor. The player accumulating the highest amount of prize money over the six events will receive a bonus of £150,000.

- Winner: £80,000
- Runner-up: £35,000
- Semi-final: £20,000
- Quarter-final: £10,000
- Last 16: £5,000
- Last 32: £4,000
- Last 64: £3,000
- Highest break: £5,000
- Total: £400,000

== Main draw ==
Below are the event's results from the last-32 stage to the final. Player names in bold denote match winners. Numbers in brackets denote player seedings.

**Last 32**; Best of 9 frames
**Judd Trump (ENG) (1)**	**5**
Mark Davis (ENG)	1
Duane Jones (WAL)	1
**Joe Perry (ENG) (17)**	**5**
Kacper Filipiak (POL)	4
**Ding Junhui (CHN) (9)**	**5**
**Dominic Dale (WAL)**	**5**
Stephen Maguire (SCO) (8)	4
Shaun Murphy (ENG) (5)	4
**Jamie O'Neill (ENG)**	**5**
**Jordan Brown (NIR)**	**5**
Graeme Dott (SCO) (21)	2
**Barry Hawkins (ENG) (20)**	**5**
Ryan Day (WAL)	4
Liang Wenbo (CHN) (29)	4
**Jak Jones (WAL)**	**5**
**Fergal O'Brien (IRL)**	**5**
Michael White (WAL)	1
Mark Joyce (ENG)	4
**Joe O'Connor (ENG)**	**5**
**Tom Ford (ENG) (22)**	**5**
Yuan Sijun (CHN)	0
**Stuart Carrington (ENG)**	**w/o**
John Higgins (SCO) (6)	w/d
Pang Junxu (CHN)	3
**Robbie Williams (ENG)**	**5**
**Stuart Bingham (ENG) (10)**	**5**
Zhou Yuelong (CHN) (23)	2
Louis Heathcote (ENG)	4
**Jack Lisowski (ENG) (15)**	**5**
**Luca Brecel (BEL) (31)**	**5**
Noppon Saengkham (THA)	1

**Last 16**; Best of 9 frames
**(England) Judd Trump (1)**	**5**
(England) Joe Perry (17)	3
**(China) Ding Junhui (9)**	**5**
(Wales) Dominic Dale	0
(England) Jamie O'Neill	4
**(Northern Ireland) Jordan Brown**	**5**
**(England) Barry Hawkins (20)**	**5**
(Wales) Jak Jones	2
(Republic of Ireland) Fergal O'Brien	0
**(England) Joe O'Connor**	**5**
**(England) Tom Ford (22)**	**5**
(England) Stuart Carrington	2
(England) Robbie Williams	4
**(England) Stuart Bingham (10)**	**5**
**(England) Jack Lisowski (15)**	**5**
(Belgium) Luca Brecel (31)	2

**Quarter-finals**; Best of 9 frames
**(England) Judd Trump (1)**	**5**
(China) Ding Junhui (9)	3
(Northern Ireland) Jordan Brown	1
**(England) Barry Hawkins (20)**	**5**
(England) Joe O'Connor	1
**(England) Tom Ford (22)**	**5**
(England) Stuart Bingham (10)	3
**(England) Jack Lisowski (15)**	**5**

**Semi-finals**; Best of 11 frames
**(England) Judd Trump (1)**	**6**
(England) Barry Hawkins (20)	5
(England) Tom Ford (22)	2
**(England) Jack Lisowski (15)**	**6**

**Final**; Best of 17 frames
**(England) Judd Trump (1)**	**9**
(England) Jack Lisowski (15)	2

=== Final ===
Final: Best of 17 frames. Referee: Rob Spencer; Marshall Arena, Milton Keynes, England, 31 January 2021.
**Judd Trump** (1); England	**9**–2	Jack Lisowski (15); England
Afternoon: **76**–31, 0–**90**, **87**–0, **64**–25, **65**–30, **72**–0, **68**–58, **71**–14; Evening: **87**–49, 0–**106**, **119**–0 (119)
**119**	Highest break	67
**1**	Century breaks	0

== Qualifying ==
Qualifying for the event took place between 10 and 14 November 2020 at the Marshall Arena in Milton Keynes, England. There were two rounds of qualifying with matches being played as best-of-9 frames.

=== Round 1 ===
Judd Trump (ENG) (1)	5–2	Anthony Hamilton (ENG)
Sunny Akani (THA)	2–5	Peter Lines (ENG)
Xiao Guodong (CHN) (32)	5–4	Lu Ning (CHN)
Mark Davis (ENG)	5–3	Ben Hancorn (ENG)
Gary Wilson (ENG) (16)	4–5	Lei Peifan (CHN)
Allan Taylor (ENG)	4–5	Duane Jones (WAL)
Joe Perry (ENG) (17)	5–3	Li Hang (CHN)
Steven Hallworth (ENG)	5–1	Chang Bingyu (CHN)
Kacper Filipiak (POL)	w/o–w/d	Riley Parsons (ENG)
Scott Donaldson (SCO) (24)	2–5	Luo Honghao (CHN)
Fan Zhengyi (CHN)	1–5	Ashley Carty (ENG)
Ding Junhui (CHN) (9)	5–3	Martin Gould (ENG)
Sean Maddocks (ENG)	0–5	Jamie Jones (WAL)
Matthew Selt (ENG) (25)	4–5	Dominic Dale (WAL)
Barry Pinches (ENG)	2–5	Alan McManus (SCO)
Stephen Maguire (SCO) (8)	w/o–w/d	Rod Lawler (ENG)
Shaun Murphy (ENG) (5)	5–0	Chen Zifan (CHN)
Ian Burns (ENG)	5–2	David Lilley (ENG)
Zhao Xintong (CHN) (28)	5–3	Lee Walker (WAL)
Daniel Wells (WAL)	3–5	Jamie O'Neill (ENG)
Yan Bingtao (CHN) (12)	4–5	Sam Craigie (ENG)
Jordan Brown (NIR)	5–2	Rory McLeod (JAM)
Graeme Dott (SCO) (21)	w/o–w/d	Fraser Patrick (SCO)
Jamie Wilson (ENG)	2–5	Leo Fernandez (IRL)
Jimmy White (ENG)	w/o–w/d	Mark King (ENG)
Barry Hawkins (ENG) (20)	5–2	Hossein Vafaei (IRN)
Ryan Day (WAL)	5–3	Andy Hicks (ENG)
Mark Williams (WAL) (13)	4–5	Paul Davison (ENG)
Aaron Hill (IRL)	5–2	Billy Castle (ENG)
Liang Wenbo (CHN) (29)	5–2	Ken Doherty (IRL)
Jak Jones (WAL)	5–3	Si Jiahui (CHN)
Kyren Wilson (ENG) (4)	5–0	Zak Surety (ENG)

Mark Selby (ENG) (3)	3–5	Fergal O'Brien (IRL)
Simon Lichtenberg (GER)	5–1	Amine Amiri (MAR)
Matthew Stevens (WAL) (30)	2–5	Michael White (WAL)
Mitchell Mann (ENG)	0–5	Elliot Slessor (ENG)
Thepchaiya Un-Nooh (THA) (14)	4–5	Mark Joyce (ENG)
Soheil Vahedi (IRN)	5–3	David Grace (ENG)
Anthony McGill (SCO) (19)	5–3	Zhao Jianbo (CHN)
Joe O'Connor (ENG)	5–3	Lyu Haotian (CHN)
Liam Highfield (ENG)	5–1	Jamie Curtis-Barrett (ENG)
Tom Ford (ENG) (22)	5–0	Gerard Greene (NIR)
Jimmy Robertson (ENG)	5–1	Alex Borg (MLT)
David Gilbert (ENG) (11)	2–5	Yuan Sijun (CHN)
Chris Wakelin (ENG)	1–5	Stuart Carrington (ENG)
Michael Holt (ENG) (27)	5–2	Brian Ochoiski (FRA)
Ashley Hugill (ENG)	w/o–w/d	Tian Pengfei (CHN)
John Higgins (SCO) (6)	5–4	Robert Milkins (ENG)
Mark Allen (NIR) (7)	5–1	Gao Yang (CHN)
Pang Junxu (CHN)	5–2	Alexander Ursenbacher (SUI)
Kurt Maflin (NOR) (26)	2–5	Martin O'Donnell (ENG)
Robbie Williams (ENG)	5–4	Florian Nüßle (AUT)
Stuart Bingham (ENG) (10)	5–1	Eden Sharav (ISR)
Ricky Walden (ENG)	5–1	Xu Si (CHN)
Zhou Yuelong (CHN) (23)	5–0	Lukas Kleckers (GER)
Peter Devlin (ENG)	5–3	Iulian Boiko (UKR)
Louis Heathcote (ENG)	5–0	Farakh Ajaib (ENG)
Ali Carter (ENG) (18)	2–5	Nigel Bond (ENG)
Jackson Page (WAL)	4–5	Brandon Sargeant (ENG)
Jack Lisowski (ENG) (15)	5–3	Igor Figueiredo (BRA)
Jamie Clarke (WAL)	2–5	Andrew Higginson (ENG)
Luca Brecel (BEL) (31)	5–4	James Cahill (ENG)
Oliver Lines (ENG)	2–5	Noppon Saengkham (THA)
Neil Robertson (AUS) (2)	4–5	Ben Woollaston (ENG)

=== Round 2 ===
(England) Judd Trump (1)	5–0	(England) Peter Lines
(China) Xiao Guodong (32)	4–5	(England) Mark Davis
(China) Lei Peifan	3–5	(Wales) Duane Jones
(England) Joe Perry (17)	5–4	(England) Steven Hallworth
(Poland) Kacper Filipiak	5–1	(China) Luo Honghao
(England) Ashley Carty	0–5	(China) Ding Junhui (9)
(Wales) Jamie Jones	0–5	(Wales) Dominic Dale
(Scotland) Alan McManus	4–5	(Scotland) Stephen Maguire (8)
(England) Shaun Murphy (5)	5–1	(England) Ian Burns
(China) Zhao Xintong (28)	3–5	(England) Jamie O'Neill
(England) Sam Craigie	2–5	(Northern Ireland) Jordan Brown
(Scotland) Graeme Dott (21)	5–1	(Republic of Ireland) Leo Fernandez
(England) Jimmy White	2–5	(England) Barry Hawkins (20)
(Wales) Ryan Day	5–1	(England) Paul Davison
(Republic of Ireland) Aaron Hill	0–5	(China) Liang Wenbo (29)
(Wales) Jak Jones	5–4	(England) Kyren Wilson (4)

(Republic of Ireland) Fergal O'Brien	5–2	(Germany) Simon Lichtenberg
(Wales) Michael White	5–4	(England) Elliot Slessor
(England) Mark Joyce	5–4	(Iran) Soheil Vahedi
(Scotland) Anthony McGill (19)	4–5	(England) Joe O'Connor
(England) Liam Highfield	4–5	(England) Tom Ford (22)
(England) Jimmy Robertson	3–5	(China) Yuan Sijun
(England) Stuart Carrington	5–3	(England) Michael Holt (27)
(England) Ashley Hugill	0–5	(Scotland) John Higgins (6)
(Northern Ireland) Mark Allen (7)	2–5	(China) Pang Junxu
(England) Martin O'Donnell	4–5	(England) Robbie Williams
(England) Stuart Bingham (10)	5–2	(England) Ricky Walden
(China) Zhou Yuelong (23)	5–0	(England) Peter Devlin
(England) Louis Heathcote	5–3	(England) Nigel Bond
(England) Brandon Sargeant	2–5	(England) Jack Lisowski (15)
(England) Andrew Higginson	2–5	(Belgium) Luca Brecel (31)
(Thailand) Noppon Saengkham	5–2	(England) Ben Woollaston

== Century breaks ==
=== Main stage centuries ===
Total: 25

- 140, 133, 116, 101 – Barry Hawkins
- 135, 113 – Robbie Williams
- 134, 132, 131, 124, 104 – Tom Ford
- 131, 131, 119, 101, 100 – Judd Trump
- 128 – Jack Lisowski
- 115 – Louis Heathcote
- 114 – Liang Wenbo
- 110 – Stuart Bingham
- 104, 101 – Ding Junhui
- 104 – Jamie O'Neill
- 101 – Jordan Brown
- 100 – Jak Jones

=== Qualifying stage centuries ===
Total: 58

- 147, 117, 113 – Shaun Murphy
- 138, 115 – Stuart Bingham
- 133, 103 – Jack Lisowski
- 133 – Xiao Guodong
- 132, 104 – Luca Brecel
- 132 – Yan Bingtao
- 131 – Jamie O'Neill
- 130, 100 – Anthony McGill
- 129 – Andrew Higginson
- 128 – Simon Lichtenberg
- 127 – Elliot Slessor
- 127 – Zhao Xintong
- 126, 124 – Kyren Wilson
- 126, 101 – Mark Allen
- 126 – Kurt Maflin
- 125 – Martin Gould
- 122 – Sunny Akani
- 121 – Pang Junxu
- 119 – John Higgins
- 118 – Jordan Brown
- 115, 112 – Lei Peifan
- 114, 105, 101 – Ricky Walden
- 113, 110 – Ryan Day
- 113 – Robert Milkins
- 112 – Sam Craigie
- 110 – Ding Junhui
- 110 – Mark Joyce
- 109, 102, 101 – Jimmy Robertson
- 108 – Stephen Maguire
- 108 – Mark Selby
- 108 – Michael White
- 107, 103, 100 – Judd Trump
- 107 – Dominic Dale
- 107 – Joe Perry
- 106 – Luo Honghao
- 104 – Jamie Jones
- 102 – Liang Wenbo
- 102 – Joe O'Connor
- 101 – Tom Ford
- 101 – Barry Hawkins
- 101 – Martin O'Donnell
- 101 – Robbie Williams
