= 2021 English Open (snooker) =

Snooker tournament

2021 BetVictor English Open
Tournament information
- Dates: 1–7 November 2021
- Venue: Marshall Arena
- City: Milton Keynes
- Country: England
- Organisation: World Snooker Tour
- Format: Ranking event
- Total prize fund: £405,000
- Winner's share: £70,000
- Highest break: Barry Hawkins (ENG) (146)

Final
- Champion: Neil Robertson (AUS)
- Runner-up: John Higgins (SCO)
- Score: 9–8

The 2021 English Open (officially the 2021 BetVictor English Open) was a professional ranking snooker tournament that took place from 1–7 November 2021 at the Marshall Arena in Milton Keynes, England. It was the fourth ranking event of the 2021–22 season, and the second event in both the Home Nations Series and the European Series. Qualifying for the tournament took place from 17 to 22 September 2021 at the Metrodome in Barnsley, England, although matches involving the top 16 players, and two other matches involving English wildcards, were held over and played at the Marshall Arena. The event was broadcast on Eurosport across the United Kingdom and Europe.

Judd Trump was the defending champion, having defeated Neil Robertson 9–8 in the previous year's final. Trump lost 3–5 to Mark King in the quarter-finals. Robertson faced John Higgins in the final. Although Robertson led 5–3 after the afternoon session, Higgins won the first four frames of the evening session to lead 7–5, and then moved within one frame of victory at 8–6. However, Robertson won the last three frames to defeat Higgins 9–8 and claim the 21st ranking title of his professional career. He became the third player, after Trump and Mark Selby, to win three Home Nations titles, and the first player to win three different tournaments in the series, having previously won the Scottish Open and the Welsh Open.

Higgins sustained his second successive defeat from 8–6 ahead in a best-of-17 ranking final. He had lost the 2021 Northern Ireland Open final to Mark Allen under similar circumstances the previous month.

== Prize fund ==
The breakdown of prize money for this year is shown below:

- Winner: £70,000
- Runner-up: £30,000
- Semi-final: £20,000
- Quarter-final: £10,000
- Last 16: £7,500
- Last 32: £4,000
- Last 64: £3,000
- Highest break: £5,000
- Total: £405,000

== Main draw ==
=== Top half ===
Last 64; Best of 7 frames
Judd Trump (ENG) (1)	4
Jimmy Robertson (ENG)	2
Xiao Guodong (CHN) (32)	2
Steven Hallworth (ENG)	4
Anthony McGill (SCO) (16)	4
Gerard Greene (NIR)	0
Ross Muir (SCO)	4
Wu Yize (CHN)	1
Alexander Ursenbacher (SUI)	0
Tom Ford (ENG) (24)	4
Cao Yupeng (CHN)	0
Mark King (ENG)	4
Xu Si (CHN)	0
Zhao Xintong (CHN) (25)	4
Chang Bingyu (CHN)	3
(England) Paul Deaville	4
Kyren Wilson (ENG) (5)	4
Ashley Carty (ENG)	2
Gary Wilson (ENG) (28)	3
Ben Woollaston (ENG)	4
Barry Hawkins (ENG) (12)	4
Jak Jones (WAL)	3
Soheil Vahedi (IRN)	1
Robbie Williams (ENG)	4
Mark Davis (ENG)	4
Graeme Dott (SCO) (20)	3
Fergal O'Brien (IRL)	4
Stuart Bingham (ENG) (13)	3
Sunny Akani (THA)	4
Ricky Walden (ENG) (29)	3
James Cahill (ENG)	w/d
Neil Robertson (AUS) (4)	w/o

Last 32; Best of 7 frames
(England) Judd Trump (1)	4
(England) Steven Hallworth	1
(Scotland) Anthony McGill (16)	0
(Scotland) Ross Muir	4
(England) Tom Ford (24)	3
(England) Mark King	4
(China) Zhao Xintong (25)	3
(England) Paul Deaville	4
(England) Kyren Wilson (5)	4
(England) Ben Woollaston	3
(England) Barry Hawkins (12)	1
(England) Robbie Williams	4
(England) Mark Davis	4
(Republic of Ireland) Fergal O'Brien	1
(Thailand) Sunny Akani	2
(Australia) Neil Robertson (4)	4

Last 16; Best of 7 frames
(England) Judd Trump (1)	4
(Scotland) Ross Muir	1
(England) Mark King	4
(England) Paul Deaville	0
(England) Kyren Wilson (5)	4
(England) Robbie Williams	1
(England) Mark Davis	3
(Australia) Neil Robertson (4)	4

Quarter-finals; Best of 9 frames
(England) Judd Trump (1)	3
(England) Mark King	5
(England) Kyren Wilson (5)	4
(Australia) Neil Robertson (4)	5

Semi-finals; Best of 11 frames
(England) Mark King	4
(Australia) Neil Robertson (4)	6

=== Bottom half ===
Last 64; Best of 7 frames
Ronnie O'Sullivan (ENG) (3)	4
Michael Georgiou (CYP)	1
Rory McLeod (JAM)	1
Anthony Hamilton (ENG)	4
Mark Joyce (ENG)	0
Jamie Clarke (WAL)	4
Thepchaiya Un-Nooh (THA) (19)	4
Peter Devlin (ENG)	0
Li Hang (CHN)	4
Ali Carter (ENG) (22)	2
Stuart Carrington (ENG)	0
Luca Brecel (BEL)	4
Fraser Patrick (SCO)	4
Hossein Vafaei (IRN)	2
Joe O'Connor (ENG)	2
Shaun Murphy (ENG) (6)	4
John Higgins (SCO) (7)	4
Oliver Lines (ENG)	0
Lu Ning (CHN)	w/o
Allan Taylor (ENG)	w/d
Ding Junhui (CHN) (10)	4
Tian Pengfei (CHN)	1
Martin Gould (ENG) (23)	4
Scott Donaldson (SCO)	0
Martin O'Donnell (ENG)	1
David Gilbert (ENG) (18)	4
Nigel Bond (ENG)	1
Yan Bingtao (CHN) (15)	4
Stephen Hendry (SCO)	0
Chris Wakelin (ENG)	4
Jamie Wilson (ENG)	1
Mark Selby (ENG) (2)	4

Last 32; Best of 7 frames
(England) Ronnie O'Sullivan (3)	4
(England) Anthony Hamilton	3
(Wales) Jamie Clarke	4
(Thailand) Thepchaiya Un-Nooh (19)	1
(China) Li Hang	1
(Belgium) Luca Brecel	4
(Scotland) Fraser Patrick	4
(England) Shaun Murphy (6)	2
(Scotland) John Higgins (7)	4
(China) Lu Ning	3
(China) Ding Junhui (10)	4
(England) Martin Gould (23)	0
(England) David Gilbert (18)	2
(China) Yan Bingtao (15)	4
(England) Chris Wakelin	1
(England) Mark Selby (2)	4

Last 16; Best of 7 frames
(England) Ronnie O'Sullivan (3)	4
(Wales) Jamie Clarke	0
(Belgium) Luca Brecel	4
(Scotland) Fraser Patrick	2
(Scotland) John Higgins (7)	4
(China) Ding Junhui (10)	1
(China) Yan Bingtao (15)	4
(England) Mark Selby (2)	3

Quarter-finals; Best of 9 frames
(England) Ronnie O'Sullivan (3)	5
(Belgium) Luca Brecel	1
(Scotland) John Higgins (7)	5
(China) Yan Bingtao (15)	3

Semi-finals; Best of 11 frames
(England) Ronnie O'Sullivan (3)	5
(Scotland) John Higgins (7)	6

== Final ==
Final: Best of 17 frames. Referee: Rob Spencer; Marshall Arena, Milton Keynes, England, 7 November 2021
Neil Robertson (4); Australia	9–8	John Higgins (7); Scotland
Afternoon: 72–0, 80–24, 0–90, 51–66, 140–0 (140), 65–2, 16–68, 123–1 (123); Evening: 39–68, 0–89, 37–71, 43–74, 87–7, 18–71, 79–9, 121–1 (120), 74–22
140	Highest break	90
3	Century breaks	0

== Qualifying ==
Qualification for the tournament took place from 17 to 22 September 2021 at the Metrodome in Barnsley, England. Matches which involved the top 16 players and two wildcard nominations were held over and played at the Marshall Arena. Zhou Yuelong and Zhang Jiankang were withdrawn from the event due to being identified as a close contact of a positive COVID-19 case; they were replaced by Ross Muir and Bai Langning respectively. Separately, Lei Peifan withdrew and was replaced by James Cahill. Cahill won his qualifying match but then he had to withdraw due to a positive COVID-19 test. Mark Williams was also withdrawn from the event after testing positive for COVID-19 in October; he was replaced by Mark Lloyd. Teenage amateurs Paul Deaville and Oliver Sykes played in their first professional events after receiving an invite from WST.

- Judd Trump (ENG) (1) 4–1 Matthew Selt (ENG) (Note: Match was held over and played in Milton Keynes.)
- Jimmy Robertson (ENG) 4–0 Yuan Sijun (CHN)
- Xiao Guodong (CHN) 4–2 Alfie Burden (ENG)
- Sam Craigie (ENG) 3–4 Steven Hallworth (ENG)
- Anthony McGill (SCO) 4–1 Gao Yang (CHN)
- Gerard Greene (NIR) 4–1 Liam Highfield (ENG)
- Ross Muir (SCO) 4–1 Dean Young (SCO)
- Wu Yize (CHN) 4–3 Ashley Hugill (ENG)
- Alexander Ursenbacher (SUI) 4–2 Ben Hancorn (ENG)
- Tom Ford (ENG) 4–0 Sean Maddocks (ENG)
- Cao Yupeng (CHN) 4–0 Mitchell Mann (ENG)
- Stephen Maguire (SCO) (9) 3–4 Mark King (ENG)
- Xu Si (CHN) 4–2 Jamie Jones (WAL)
- Zhao Xintong (CHN) 4–1 Jimmy White (ENG)
- Chang Bingyu (CHN) 4–1 Dominic Dale (WAL)
- Mark Lloyd (ENG) 0–4 Paul Deaville (ENG)
- Kyren Wilson (ENG) (5) 4–0 Noppon Saengkham (THA)
- Ashley Carty (ENG) 4–2 Jordan Brown (NIR)
- Gary Wilson (ENG) 4–2 Craig Steadman (ENG)
- Ben Woollaston (ENG) 4–0 Jackson Page (WAL)
- Barry Hawkins (ENG) 4–1 Reanne Evans (ENG)
- Bai Langning (CHN) 2–4 Jak Jones (WAL)
- Joe Perry (ENG) 2–4 Soheil Vahedi (IRN)
- Robbie Williams (ENG) 4–0 Peter Lines (ENG)
- Lukas Kleckers (GER) 1–4 Mark Davis (ENG)
- Graeme Dott (SCO) 4–2 Farakh Ajaib (PAK)
- Fergal O'Brien (IRL) 4–0 Iulian Boiko (UKR)
- Stuart Bingham (ENG) 4–1 Ng On-yee (HKG)
- Sunny Akani (THA) 4–1 Ken Doherty (IRL)
- Ricky Walden (ENG) 4–0 Michael Judge (IRL)
- James Cahill (ENG) 4–2 Lee Walker (WAL)
- Neil Robertson (AUS) (4) 4–0 Andy Hicks (ENG)
- Ronnie O'Sullivan (ENG) (3) 4–1 David Lilley (ENG)
- Elliot Slessor (ENG) 1–4 Michael Georgiou (CYP)
- Liang Wenbo (CHN) 2–4 Rory McLeod (JAM)
- Anthony Hamilton (ENG) 4–2 Louis Heathcote (ENG)
- Jack Lisowski (ENG) 3–4 Mark Joyce (ENG)
- Jamie Clarke (WAL) 4–2 Zak Surety (ENG)
- Thepchaiya Un-Nooh (THA) 4–0 Jamie O'Neill (ENG)
- Matthew Stevens (WAL) 3–4 Peter Devlin (ENG)
- Li Hang (CHN) 4–1 Si Jiahui (CHN)
- Ali Carter (ENG) 4–1 Fan Zhengyi (CHN)
- Stuart Carrington (ENG) 4–2 Hammad Miah (ENG)
- Mark Allen (NIR) 1–4 Luca Brecel (BEL)
- Simon Lichtenberg (GER) 1–4 Fraser Patrick (SCO)
- Kurt Maflin (NOR) 1–4 Hossein Vafaei (IRN)
- Joe O'Connor (ENG) 4–1 Pang Junxu (CHN)
- Shaun Murphy (ENG) (6) 4–3 Duane Jones (WAL)
- John Higgins (SCO) (7) 4–1 Zhao Jianbo (CHN)
- Oliver Lines (ENG) 4–0 Zhang Anda (CHN)
- Ryan Day (WAL) 3–4 Lu Ning (CHN)
- Oliver Sykes (ENG) 1–4 Allan Taylor (ENG)
- Ding Junhui (CHN) 4–1 Andrew Pagett (WAL)
- Barry Pinches (ENG) 0–4 Tian Pengfei (CHN)
- Martin Gould (ENG) 4–0 Andrew Higginson (ENG)
- Ian Burns (ENG) 3–4 Scott Donaldson (SCO)
- Lyu Haotian (CHN) 3–4 Martin O'Donnell (ENG)
- David Gilbert (ENG) 4–2 David Grace (ENG)
- Nigel Bond (ENG) 4–1 Chen Zifan (CHN)
- Yan Bingtao (CHN) 4–1 Aaron Hill (IRL)
- Michael White (WAL) 1–4 Stephen Hendry (SCO)
- Michael Holt (ENG) 3–4 Chris Wakelin (ENG)
- Jamie Wilson (ENG) 4–0 Robert Milkins (ENG)
- Mark Selby (ENG) (2) 4–2 Sanderson Lam (ENG)

== Century breaks ==
=== Main stage centuries ===
Total: 45

- 141, 135 – Chris Wakelin
- 140, 126, 123, 120, 111, 106, 104, 101 – Neil Robertson
- 138 – Shaun Murphy
- 138 – Zhao Xintong
- 136 – Mark Davis
- 135, 117, 110, 102, 100 – Kyren Wilson
- 129, 127, 123, 120, 119, 108, 108, 103 – Ronnie O'Sullivan
- 128 – Gary Wilson
- 127 – Ali Carter
- 120 – Xiao Guodong
- 119, 104, 103 – John Higgins
- 115, 105 – Martin Gould
- 114 – Tom Ford
- 111, 104 – Judd Trump
- 111 – Ben Woollaston
- 109, 101 – David Gilbert
- 105 – Chang Bingyu
- 103 – Jamie Clarke
- 102 – Mark Selby
- 101 – Luca Brecel
- 100 – Ross Muir

=== Qualifying stage centuries ===
Total: 23

- 146 – Barry Hawkins
- 139, 123, 105 – Thepchaiya Un-Nooh
- 135 – John Higgins
- 129 – Kyren Wilson
- 126 – Ricky Walden
- 125 – Cao Yupeng
- 113 – Mark Joyce
- 113 – Mark Selby
- 111 – Chang Bingyu
- 111 – Alexander Ursenbacher
- 109 – Anthony McGill
- 109 – Judd Trump
- 108 – Jimmy Robertson
- 107 – David Gilbert
- 106 – Tom Ford
- 106 – Chris Wakelin
- 104 – Stuart Carrington
- 104 – Anthony Hamilton
- 101 – Robbie Williams
- 101 – Gary Wilson
- 100 – Ronnie O'Sullivan
