= 2022 Gibraltar Open =

Snooker tournament

2022 BetVictor Gibraltar Open
Tournament information
- Dates: 24–26 March 2022
- Venue: Europa Point Sports Complex
- City: Gibraltar
- Organisation: World Snooker Tour
- Format: Ranking event
- Total prize fund: £251,000
- Winner's share: £50,000
- Highest break: Stuart Bingham (ENG) (147)

Final
- Champion: Robert Milkins (ENG)
- Runner-up: Kyren Wilson (ENG)
- Score: 4–2

The 2022 Gibraltar Open (officially the 2022 BetVictor Gibraltar Open) was a professional snooker tournament that took place from 24 to 26 March 2022 at the Europa Point Sports Complex. The 14th ranking event of the 2021–22 snooker season, it followed the Turkish Masters and preceded the Tour Championship. It was the seventh -- and currently final -- edition of the Gibraltar Open, first held in 2015, and the eighth and final event of the 2021–22 European Series.

The defending champion was Judd Trump, who defeated Jack Lisowski 4–0 in the 2021 final. However, Trump lost 0–4 to Ricky Walden in the last 16. Robert Milkins defeated Kyren Wilson 4–2 in the final to win the first ranking title of his 27-year professional career. Aged 46, Milkins became the oldest first-time winner of a ranking event since Doug Mountjoy won the 1988 UK Championship.

John Higgins secured the European Series bonus of £150,000, awarded to the player who won the most cumulative prize money over the eight tournaments. Stuart Bingham made the highest break of the tournament, a 147 in the final frame of his first-round match with Gerard Greene. It was the ninth maximum break of Bingham's career and the eighth of the 2021–22 season.

== Format ==
The event was the seventh iteration of the Gibraltar Open, which was first held in 2015. It took place from 24 to 26 March 2022 at the Europa Point Sports Complex in Gibraltar. The 14th ranking tournament of the 2021–22 snooker season, it followed the Turkish Masters and preceded the Tour Championship. The defending champion was Judd Trump, who had defeated Jack Lisowski 4–0 in the 2021 final. The tournament was organised by the World Snooker Tour and sponsored by BetVictor. All matches were contested as the best of seven frames.

The event saw a significant number of withdrawals, including Mark Williams, Shaun Murphy, Stephen Maguire, Kurt Maflin, Anthony McGill, Sam Craigie, David Gilbert and Anthony Hamilton. Additionally, bad weather in Gibraltar led to a number of flights being diverted to Málaga, where some players travelling on non-British passports did not meet Spanish visa requirements and had to return to the UK.

=== European Series bonus ===
The Gibraltar Open was the concluding event of the 2021–22 European Series, which carried a £150,000 bonus for the player who won the most cumulative prize money over its eight tournaments. Eleven players remained in contention for the bonus at the beginning of the tournament. John Higgins topped the series money list with £98,000; Mark Allen had the same amount, but Higgins led on countback, having gone further in the European Masters than Allen. Fan Zhengyi, Luca Brecel, Neil Robertson and Ronnie O’Sullivan all began the tournament with £90,000 or more. Zhao Xintong, Hossein Vafaei, Joe Perry, Judd Trump and Ricky Walden were also in contention. Vafaei was forced to withdraw from the tournament due to visa issues in Spain. O'Sullivan and Fan lost in the round of 128; Zhao, Perry, and Brecel lost in the round of 64; and Higgins and Allen lost in the round of 32. Trump and Robertson needed to reach the final to remain in contention, but both lost in the round of 16. Walden needed to win the event to capture the bonus, but he lost in the semi-finals. This meant that Higgins remained top of the series prize money list and won the bonus.

=== Prize fund ===
The event featured a prize fund of £251,000, of which the winner received £50,000. The breakdown of the tournament's prize money is shown below:

- Winner: £50,000
- Runner-up: £20,000
- Semi-final: £6,000
- Quarter-final: £5,000
- Last 16: £4,000
- Last 32: £3,000
- Last 64: £2,000
- Highest break: £5,000
- Total: £251,000

== Tournament draw ==
Below is the full draw for the event. Players in bold denote match winners.

=== Top half ===
==== Section 1 ====
Last 128; Best of 7 frames
**Judd Trump (ENG) (1)**	**4**
Andrew Higginson (ENG)	0
Zhao Jianbo (CHN)	0
**Simon Blackwell (ENG)**	**4**
Scott Donaldson (SCO)	1
**Lu Ning (CHN)**	**4**
Chang Bingyu (CHN)	w/d
**Sanderson Lam (ENG)**	**w/o**
**Ricky Walden (ENG) (16)**	**4**
Dylan Mitchell (ENG)	0
Haydon Pinhey (ENG)	2
**Jackson Page (WAL)**	**4**
**Ryan Day (WAL)**	**4**
Ng On-yee (HKG)	2
Lee Walker (WAL)	3
**Zhou Yuelong (CHN)**	**4**

Last 64; Best of 7 frames
**(England) Judd Trump (1)**	**4**
(England) Simon Blackwell	0
(China) Lu Ning	2
**(England) Sanderson Lam**	**4**
**(England) Ricky Walden (16)**	**4**
(Wales) Jackson Page	2
(Wales) Ryan Day	1
**(China) Zhou Yuelong**	**4**

Last 32; Best of 7 frames
**(England) Judd Trump (1)**	**4**
(England) Sanderson Lam	1
**(England) Ricky Walden (16)**	**4**
(China) Zhou Yuelong	2

Last 16; Best of 7 frames
(England) Judd Trump (1)	0
**(England) Ricky Walden (16)**	**4**

==== Section 2 ====
Last 128; Best of 7 frames
Li Hang (CHN)	w/d
**Luke Pinches (ENG)**	**w/o**
Martin O'Donnell (ENG)	0
**Jordan Brown (NIR)**	**4**
Dominic Dale (WAL)	2
**Louis Heathcote (ENG)**	**4**
Lee Stephens (ENG)	0
**Ken Doherty (IRL)**	**4**
**Jamie Jones (WAL)**	**w/o**
Phil O'Kane (ENG)	w/d
Xu Si (CHN)	w/d
**Iulian Boiko (UKR)**	**w/o**
Peter Devlin (ENG)	2
**Xiao Guodong (CHN)**	**4**
Barry Hawkins (ENG) (9)	3
**Zhang Anda (CHN)**	**4**

Last 64; Best of 7 frames
(England) Luke Pinches	0
**(Northern Ireland) Jordan Brown**	**4**
**(England) Louis Heathcote**	**4**
(Republic of Ireland) Ken Doherty	3
**(Wales) Jamie Jones**	**4**
(Ukraine) Iulian Boiko	0
(China) Xiao Guodong	2
**(China) Zhang Anda**	**4**

Last 32; Best of 7 frames
**(Northern Ireland) Jordan Brown**	**4**
(England) Louis Heathcote	0
**(Wales) Jamie Jones**	**4**
(China) Zhang Anda	2

Last 16; Best of 7 frames
(Northern Ireland) Jordan Brown	3
**(Wales) Jamie Jones**	**4**

==== Section 3 ====
Last 128; Best of 7 frames
**John Higgins (SCO) (5)**	**4**
David Grace (ENG)	2
**John Astley (ENG)**	**4**
Michael Holt (ENG)	3
**Cao Yupeng (CHN)**	**4**
Ben Fortey (ENG)	3
**Jimmy Robertson (ENG)**	**4**
Tian Pengfei (CHN)	1
Rod Lawler (ENG)	0
**Aaron Hill (IRL)**	**4**
Joshua Cooper (ENG)	1
**Stuart Carrington (ENG)**	**4**
**Ding Junhui (CHN)**	**4**
Mark Lloyd (ENG)	0
**Gary Wilson (ENG)**	**4**
Mark King (ENG)	2

Last 64; Best of 7 frames
**(Scotland) John Higgins (5)**	**4**
(England) John Astley	1
(China) Cao Yupeng	3
**(England) Jimmy Robertson**	**4**
**(Republic of Ireland) Aaron Hill**	**4**
(England) Stuart Carrington	3
**(China) Ding Junhui**	**4**
(England) Gary Wilson	1

Last 32; Best of 7 frames
(Scotland) John Higgins (5)	2
**(England) Jimmy Robertson**	**4**
(Republic of Ireland) Aaron Hill	1
**(China) Ding Junhui**	**4**

Last 16; Best of 7 frames
(England) Jimmy Robertson	0
**(China) Ding Junhui**	**4**

==== Section 4 ====
Last 128; Best of 7 frames
Ian Burns (ENG)	3
**Tom Ford (ENG)**	**4**
Joe O'Connor (ENG)	1
**Duane Jones (WAL)**	**4**
**Mitchell Mann (ENG)**	**4**
Fergal O'Brien (IRL)	3
**Jack Lisowski (ENG) (13)**	**4**
Mark Davis (ENG)	1
**Matthew Stevens (WAL)**	**w/o**
Hamim Hussain (ENG)	w/d
Andrew Pagett (WAL)	2
**Ali Carter (ENG)**	**4**
Wu Yize (CHN)	w/d
**Andy Hicks (ENG)**	**w/o**
**Kyren Wilson (ENG) (4)**	**4**
Lukas Kleckers (GER)	0

Last 64; Best of 7 frames
**(England) Tom Ford**	**4**
(Wales) Duane Jones	2
(England) Mitchell Mann	0
**(England) Jack Lisowski (13)**	**4**
(Wales) Matthew Stevens	3
**(England) Ali Carter**	**4**
(England) Andy Hicks	0
**(England) Kyren Wilson (4)**	**4**

Last 32; Best of 7 frames
**(England) Tom Ford**	**4**
(England) Jack Lisowski (13)	1
(England) Ali Carter	1
**(England) Kyren Wilson (4)**	**4**

Last 16; Best of 7 frames
(England) Tom Ford	0
**(England) Kyren Wilson (4)**	**4**

=== Bottom half ===
==== Section 5 ====
Last 128; Best of 7 frames
**Neil Robertson (AUS) (3)**	**4**
Liang Wenbo (CHN)	2
**Oliver Lines (ENG)**	**w/o**
David Gilbert (ENG)	w/d
**Daniel Womersley (ENG)**	**w/o**
Pang Junxu (CHN)	w/d
Alfie Burden (ENG)	2
**Rory McLeod (JAM)**	**4**
**Luca Brecel (BEL) (14)**	**4**
Jamie Curtis-Barrett (ENG)	3
Hammad Miah (ENG)	1
**David Lilley (ENG)**	**4**
**Robbie Williams (ENG)**	**4**
Stuart Watson (ENG)	0
Hossein Vafaei (IRN)	w/d
**Jak Jones (WAL)**	**w/o**

Last 64; Best of 7 frames
**(Australia) Neil Robertson (3)**	**4**
(England) Oliver Lines	2
(England) Daniel Womersley	0
**(Jamaica) Rory McLeod**	**4**
**(Belgium) Luca Brecel (14)**	**4**
(England) David Lilley	1
(England) Robbie Williams	3
**(Wales) Jak Jones**	**4**

Last 32; Best of 7 frames
**(Australia) Neil Robertson (3)**	**4**
(Jamaica) Rory McLeod	1
(Belgium) Luca Brecel (14)	3
**(Wales) Jak Jones**	**4**

Last 16; Best of 7 frames
(Australia) Neil Robertson (3)	1
**(Wales) Jak Jones**	**4**

==== Section 6 ====
Last 128; Best of 7 frames
Lee Prickman (GIB)	0
**Yuan Sijun (CHN)**	**4**
Craig Steadman (ENG)	1
**Gao Yang (CHN)**	**4**
**Jimmy White (ENG)**	**w/o**
Anthony Hamilton (ENG)	w/d
**Stuart Bingham (ENG) (11)**	**4**
Gerard Greene (NIR)	1
**Noppon Saengkham (THA)**	**4**
Matthew Selt (ENG)	1
**Soheil Vahedi (IRN)**	**4**
Sean Maddocks (ENG)	0
**Chris Wakelin (ENG)**	**w/o**
Si Jiahui (CHN)	w/d
**Zhao Xintong (CHN) (6)**	**4**
Jamie Clarke (WAL)	1

Last 64; Best of 7 frames
**(China) Yuan Sijun**	**4**
(China) Gao Yang	3
(England) Jimmy White	1
**(England) Stuart Bingham (11)**	**4**
(Thailand) Noppon Saengkham	3
**(Iran) Soheil Vahedi**	**4**
**(England) Chris Wakelin**	**4**
(China) Zhao Xintong (6)	1

Last 32; Best of 7 frames
(China) Yuan Sijun	2
**(England) Stuart Bingham (11)**	**4**
**(Iran) Soheil Vahedi**	**4**
(England) Chris Wakelin	2

Last 16; Best of 7 frames
**(England) Stuart Bingham (11)**	**4**
(Iran) Soheil Vahedi	1

==== Section 7 ====
Last 128; Best of 7 frames
Joshua Thomond (ENG)	2
**Ross Muir (SCO)**	**4**
Allan Taylor (ENG)	0
**Lyu Haotian (CHN)**	**4**
**Farakh Ajaib (PAK)**	**4**
Ashley Carty (ENG)	2
Elliot Slessor (ENG)	1
**Michael Georgiou (CYP)**	**4**
**Mark Allen (NIR) (10)**	**4**
Mark Joyce (ENG)	2
Fraser Patrick (SCO)	w/d
**Steven Hallworth (ENG)**	**w/o**
Lei Peifan (CHN)	0
**Robert Milkins (ENG)**	**4**
**Jamie Wilson (ENG)**	**4**
Reanne Evans (ENG)	2

Last 64; Best of 7 frames
(Scotland) Ross Muir	0
**(China) Lyu Haotian**	**4**
(Pakistan) Farakh Ajaib	1
**(Cyprus) Michael Georgiou**	**4**
**(Northern Ireland) Mark Allen (10)**	**4**
(England) Steven Hallworth	1
**(England) Robert Milkins**	**4**
(England) Jamie Wilson	1

Last 32; Best of 7 frames
**(China) Lyu Haotian**	**4**
(Cyprus) Michael Georgiou	0
(Northern Ireland) Mark Allen (10)	3
**(England) Robert Milkins**	**4**

Last 16; Best of 7 frames
(China) Lyu Haotian	2
**(England) Robert Milkins**	**4**

==== Section 8 ====
Last 128; Best of 7 frames
James Cahill (ENG)	1
**Ben Hancorn (ENG)**	**4**
**Thepchaiya Un-Nooh (THA)**	**4**
Francis Becerra (GIB)	0
**Joe Perry (ENG)**	**4**
Leo Fernandez (IRL)	3
Kuldesh Johal (ENG)	2
**Michael White (WAL)**	**4**
**Nigel Bond (ENG)**	**4**
Chen Zifan (CHN)	1
Fan Zhengyi (CHN)	3
**Ashley Hugill (ENG)**	**4**
Barry Pinches (ENG)	2
**Peter Lines (ENG)**	**4**
Ronnie O'Sullivan (ENG) (2)	3
**Ben Woollaston (ENG)**	**4**

Last 64; Best of 7 frames
**(England) Ben Hancorn**	**4**
(Thailand) Thepchaiya Un-Nooh	0
(England) Joe Perry	2
**(Wales) Michael White**	**4**
**(England) Nigel Bond**	**4**
(England) Ashley Hugill	1
(England) Peter Lines	2
**(England) Ben Woollaston**	**4**

Last 32; Best of 7 frames
**(England) Ben Hancorn**	**4**
(Wales) Michael White	2
(England) Nigel Bond	1
**(England) Ben Woollaston**	**4**

Last 16; Best of 7 frames
**(England) Ben Hancorn**	**4**
(England) Ben Woollaston	3

=== Finals ===
**Quarter-finals**; Best of 7 frames
**(England) Ricky Walden (16)**	**4**
(Wales) Jamie Jones	1
(China) Ding Junhui	1
**(England) Kyren Wilson (4)**	**4**
**(Wales) Jak Jones**	**4**
(England) Stuart Bingham (11)	0
**(England) Robert Milkins**	**4**
(England) Ben Hancorn	2

**Semi-finals**; Best of 7 frames
(England) Ricky Walden (16)	3
**(England) Kyren Wilson (4)**	**4**
(Wales) Jak Jones	2
**(England) Robert Milkins**	**4**

**Final**; Best of 7 frames
(England) Kyren Wilson (4)	2
**(England) Robert Milkins**	**4**

=== Final ===
Final: Best of 7 frames. Referee: Ben Williams; Europa Point Sports Complex, Gibraltar, 26 March 2022
Kyren Wilson (4); England	2–**4**	**Robert Milkins**; England
Frame scores: 59–**71**, 29–**62**, 25–**76**, **85**–20, **63**–27, 10–**74**
65	Highest break	**71**
0	Century breaks	0

== Century breaks ==
A total of 70 century breaks were made during the tournament.

- 147, 119, 101 – Stuart Bingham
- 140, 112, 109, 103, 102 – Ricky Walden
- 139 – Zhou Yuelong
- 138, 103 – Zhang Anda
- 135 – Noppon Saengkham
- 133, 123, 119, 112 – Ding Junhui
- 132, 117, 114, 114, 101 – Jimmy Robertson
- 132, 117, 108, 100, 100 – Kyren Wilson
- 132 – James Cahill
- 130, 112, 108, 102 – Lyu Haotian
- 126, 112 – John Higgins
- 126 – Soheil Vahedi
- 122 – Tom Ford
- 122 – Jak Jones
- 120 – Matthew Stevens
- 119, 103 – Jack Lisowski
- 119 – Zhao Xintong
- 118 – Thepchaiya Un-Nooh
- 117, 117, 105, 100 – Jordan Brown
- 116 – Jamie Jones
- 114, 102, 100 – Ben Hancorn
- 114 – Lee Walker
- 113 – Dominic Dale
- 112, 102 – Neil Robertson
- 109 – Gao Yang
- 106 – Joe Perry
- 105, 104 – Mark Allen
- 105 – David Grace
- 104, 101, 100 – Yuan Sijun
- 104, 100 – Ben Woollaston
- 104 – Louis Heathcote
- 104 – Mitchell Mann
- 103 – Luca Brecel
- 103 – Zhou Yuelong
- 102 – Ashley Hugill
- 102 – Robbie Williams
- 101 – Ross Muir
