= 2021 Snooker Shoot Out =

Snooker tournament

2021 BetVictor Snooker Shoot Out

Tournament information
- Dates: 4–7 February 2021
- Venue: Marshall Arena
- City: Milton Keynes
- Country: England
- Organisation: World Snooker Tour
- Format: Ranking event
- Total prize fund: £171,000
- Winner's share: £50,000
- Highest break: Mark Allen (NIR) (142)

Final
- Champion: Ryan Day (WAL)
- Runner-up: Mark Selby (ENG)
- Score: 67–24 (one frame)

The 2021 Shoot Out (officially the 2021 BetVictor Snooker Shoot Out) was a professional ranking snooker tournament, that took place from 4 to 7 February 2021 at the Marshall Arena in Milton Keynes, England. It was the ninth ranking event of the 2020–21 snooker season. It was played under a variation of the standard rules of snooker. The event was the fourth of six events sponsored by BetVictor, making up the 2020-21 European Series.

Michael Holt was the defending champion, having defeated Zhou Yuelong 64–1 in the 2020 final. In 2021, Holt was defeated by Matthew Stevens in the second round.

Ryan Day won the tournament for his third career ranking title, defeating Mark Selby 67–24 in the final.

== Tournament format ==
The tournament was played using a variation of the traditional snooker rules. The draw was randomised before each round. All matches were played over a single frame, each of which lasted up to 10 minutes. The event featured a variable shot clock; shots played in the first five minutes were allowed 15 seconds while the final five had a 10-second timer. All foul shots award the opponent a ball in hand. Unlike traditional snooker, if a ball does not hit a cushion on every shot, it is a foul. Rather than a coin toss, a lag is used to choose which player breaks. In the event of a draw, each player receives a shot at the blue ball this is known as a "blue ball shootout". The player who pots the ball with the cue ball from inside the D and the blue ball on its spot with the opponent missing wins the match. The event was broadcast by Eurosport.

=== Prize fund ===
The total prize fund for the event was £171,000 with the winner receiving £50,000. The breakdown of prize money is shown below:

- Winner: £50,000
- Runner-up: £20,000
- Semi-final: £8,000
- Quarter-final: £4,000
- Last 16: £2,000
- Last 32: £1,000
- Last 64: £500
- Last 128: £250 (prize money at this stage did not count towards the world rankings)
- Highest break: £5,000
- Total: £171,000

== Tournament draw ==
All times in Greenwich Mean Time. Times for quarter-finals, semi-finals and final are approximate. Players in bold denote match winners.

=== Round 1 ===
==== 4 February – 13:00 ====
- Jamie Jones (WAL) 1–**95** **Michael Holt** (ENG)
- Steven Hallworth (ENG) 34–**42** **Declan Lavery** (NIR)
- **David Grace** (ENG) **34**–10 Hayden Staniland (ENG)
- **Ken Doherty** (IRL) **60**–15 Jamie Curtis-Barrett (ENG)
- Oliver Lines (ENG) 1–**79** **Robbie Williams** (ENG)
- **Allan Taylor** (ENG) **51**–1 Jackson Page (WAL)
- Rebecca Kenna (ENG) 15–**36** **Simon Lichtenberg** (GER)
- **Zhou Yuelong** (CHN) **36**–35 Ian Burns (ENG)
- **Matthew Stevens** (WAL) **55**–53 Fergal Quinn (NIR)
- **Sam Craigie** (ENG) **43**–38 Phil O'Kane (ENG) (Note: Sam Craigie beat Phil O'Kane in a sudden death blue ball shootout after the match finished level at 38–38.)
- Lee Walker (WAL) 18–**33** **Ashley Carty** (ENG)
- Brian Ochoiski (FRA) 0–**72** **Eden Sharav** (ISR)
- Dean Young (SCO) 26–**32** **Riley Parsons** (ENG)
- Aaron Hill (IRL) 1–**69** **Andy Hicks** (ENG)
- **Liang Wenbo** (CHN) **79**–32 Ben Fortey (ENG)
- **Mark Allen** (NIR) **142**–0 Jimmy Robertson (ENG) (Note: Mark Allen's 142 break was the highest in the history of the event.)

==== 4 February – 19:00 ====
- Paul Davies (WAL) 37–**58** **Mark Williams** (WAL)
- **Martin O'Donnell** (ENG) **41**–34 Ben Woollaston (ENG)
- Anthony Hamilton (ENG) 0–**82** **Robert Milkins** (ENG)
- Andrew Higginson (ENG) 0–**86** **Mark Joyce** (ENG)
- Luca Brecel (BEL) 10–**65** **Shaun Murphy** (ENG)
- Joe O'Connor (ENG) 27–**49** **Leo Fernandez** (IRL)
- Fraser Patrick (SCO) 16–**62** **Gerard Greene** (NIR)
- **Michael White** (WAL) **30**–16 Mark King (ENG)
- Billy Castle (ENG) 31–**41** **Mark Selby** (ENG)
- Farakh Ajaib (PAK) 39–**52** **Hossein Vafaei** (IRN)
- **Duane Jones** (WAL) **68**–18 Sean Maddocks (ENG)
- **David Gilbert** (ENG) **27**–24 Lei Peifan (CHN)
- Stuart Carrington (ENG) 0–**43** **Connor Benzey** (ENG)
- David Lilley (ENG) 43–**64** **Lyu Haotian** (CHN)
- **Ian Martin** (ENG) **59**–16 Robbie McGuigan (NIR)
- **Rory McLeod** (JAM) **54**–1 Stuart Bingham (ENG)

==== 5 February – 13:00 ====
- Adrian Rosa (ENG) 1–**41** **Jimmy White** (ENG)
- Alex Clenshaw (ENG) 19–**32** **Noppon Saengkham** (THA)
- Iulian Boiko (UKR) 1–**96** **Jordan Brown** (NIR)
- Joshua Thomond (ENG) 36–**41** **Barry Pinches** (ENG)
- Ricky Walden (ENG) 33–**72** **Xiao Guodong** (CHN)
- **Alan McManus** (SCO) **21**–4 Fan Zhengyi (CHN)
- **Craig Steadman** (ENG) **51**–1 Tom Ford (ENG)
- Jack Lisowski (ENG) 14–**30** **Peter Devlin** (ENG)
- **Hamim Hussain** (ENG) **9**–7 Peter Lines (ENG)
- **Saqib Nasir** (ENG) **56**–1 James Cahill (ENG)
- **Thepchaiya Un-Nooh** (THA) **96**–22 Brandon Sargeant (ENG)
- **Nigel Bond** (ENG) **31**–30 Soheil Vahedi (IRN)
- Tian Pengfei (CHN) 12–**27** **Mitchell Mann** (ENG)
- **Joe Perry** (ENG) **43**–18 Paul Davison (ENG)
- Luke Pinches (ENG) 23–**43** **Dylan Emery** (WAL)
- Gary Wilson (ENG) 15–**45** **Barry Hawkins** (ENG)

==== 5 February – 19:00 ====
- **John Higgins** (SCO) **16**–6 Scott Donaldson (SCO)
- Jak Jones (WAL) 11–**42** **Ben Hancorn** (ENG)
- **Sean Harvey** (ENG) **54**–19 Jamie Clarke (WAL)
- **Ryan Day** (WAL) **78**–0 Matthew Selt (ENG)
- **Liam Highfield** (ENG) **57**–52 Rod Lawler (ENG)
- **Ben Mertens** (BEL) **44**–10 Zak Surety (ENG)
- Luo Honghao (CHN) 13–**63** **Alexander Ursenbacher** (SUI)
- **Elliot Slessor** (ENG) **62**–14 Daniel Wells (WAL)
- Daniel Womersley (ENG) 1–**40** **Louis Heathcote** (ENG)
- Jamie O'Neill (ENG) 14–**52** **Kuldesh Johal** (ENG)
- **Haydon Pinhey** (ENG) **34**–25 Mark Davis (ENG)
- **Sunny Akani** (THA) **35**–18 Dominic Dale (WAL)
- **Martin Gould** (ENG) **35**–1 Simon Blackwell (ENG)
- **Jamie Wilson** (ENG) **91**–8 Lukas Kleckers (GER)
- **Chris Wakelin** (ENG) **41**–22 Oliver Brown (ENG)
- **John Astley** (ENG) **63**–5 Reanne Evans (ENG)

=== Round 2 ===
==== 6 February – 13:00 ====
- John Higgins (SCO) 0–**70** **Thepchaiya Un-Nooh** (THA)
- **Robert Milkins** (ENG) **37**–0 Ben Mertens (BEL)
- **Xiao Guodong** (CHN) **22**–6 Robbie Williams (ENG)
- **Noppon Saengkham** (THA) **46**–16 Nigel Bond (ENG)
- Jimmy White (ENG) 12–**55** **Gerard Greene** (NIR)
- Leo Fernandez (IRL) 32–**34** **Declan Lavery** (NIR)
- **Martin O'Donnell** (ENG) **20**–6 Simon Lichtenberg (GER)
- Andy Hicks (ENG) 11–**27** **Ian Martin** (ENG)
- Hossein Vafaei (IRN) 16–**41** **Mark Williams** (WAL)
- Eden Sharav (ISR) 0–**81** **Liang Wenbo** (CHN)
- Duane Jones (WAL) 28–**50** **Hamim Hussain** (ENG)
- Mark Joyce (ENG) 20–**44** **Alexander Ursenbacher** (SUI)
- Mitchell Mann (ENG) 15–**18** **Ken Doherty** (IRL)
- **Michael White** (WAL) **35**–34 Rory McLeod (JAM)
- **Louis Heathcote** (ENG) **27**–17 Sean Harvey (ENG)
- **Matthew Stevens** (WAL) **52**–21 Michael Holt (ENG)

==== 6 February – 19:00 ====
- **Mark Allen** (NIR) **82**–15 Dylan Emery (WAL)
- Alan McManus (SCO) 23–**58** **Martin Gould** (ENG)
- Jamie Wilson (ENG) 38–**53** **Craig Steadman** (ENG)
- Chris Wakelin (ENG) 34–**85** **Joe Perry** (ENG)
- **David Gilbert** (ENG) **25**–11 Peter Devlin (ENG)
- **Lyu Haotian** (CHN) **23**–6 Jordan Brown (NIR)
- **Elliot Slessor** (ENG) **22**–11 Sam Craigie (ENG)
- Saqib Nasir (ENG) 15–**31** **Ben Hancorn** (ENG)
- Barry Pinches (ENG) 2–**16** **Mark Selby** (ENG)
- **Ryan Day** (WAL) **33**–6 Ashley Carty (ENG)
- **Haydon Pinhey** (ENG) **65**–24 Riley Parsons (ENG)
- **David Grace** (ENG) **46**–15 Kuldesh Johal (ENG)
- **Zhou Yuelong** (CHN) **55**–31 Barry Hawkins (ENG)
- **Sunny Akani** (THA) **48**–46 John Astley (ENG)
- **Liam Highfield** (ENG) **71**–24 Connor Benzey (ENG)
- Shaun Murphy (ENG) 9–**38** **Allan Taylor** (ENG)

=== Round 3 ===
==== 7 February – 13:00 ====
- Matthew Stevens (WAL) 10–**74** **Robert Milkins** (ENG)
- **Noppon Saengkham** (THA) **37**–27 Ken Doherty (IRL)
- Michael White (WAL) 9–**82** **Louis Heathcote** (ENG)
- Haydon Pinhey (ENG) 33–**37** **Lyu Haotian** (CHN)
- Hamim Hussain (ENG) 0–**96** **Thepchaiya Un-Nooh** (THA)
- Joe Perry (ENG) 16–**43** **Gerard Greene** (NIR)
- **Ian Martin** (ENG) **18**–15 Sunny Akani (THA)
- **Ryan Day** (WAL) **75**–0 Ben Hancorn (ENG)
- Xiao Guodong (CHN) 28–**29** **Mark Williams** (WAL)
- **Declan Lavery** (NIR) **48**–26 Elliot Slessor (ENG)
- **Martin O'Donnell** (ENG) **28**–11 Alexander Ursenbacher (SUI)
- **Zhou Yuelong** (CHN) **66**–12 Martin Gould (ENG)
- Liang Wenbo (CHN) 7–**107** **David Gilbert** (ENG)
- Allan Taylor (ENG) 15–**46** **Craig Steadman** (ENG)
- Liam Highfield (ENG) 17–**58** **Mark Selby** (ENG)
- David Grace (ENG) 23–**37** **Mark Allen** (NIR)

=== Round 4 ===
==== 7 February – 19:00 ====
- **Mark Williams** (WAL) **35**–11 Thepchaiya Un-Nooh (THA)
- **Mark Selby** (ENG) **55**–9 Declan Lavery (NIR)
- **Martin O'Donnell** (ENG) **26**–12 Ian Martin (ENG)
- Noppon Saengkham (THA) 8–**72** **Craig Steadman** (ENG)
- **Robert Milkins** (ENG) **76**–16 Lyu Haotian (CHN)
- Gerard Greene (NIR) 2–**65** **Louis Heathcote** (ENG)
- Zhou Yuelong (CHN) 37–**40** **Ryan Day** (WAL)
- Mark Allen (NIR) 1–**85** **David Gilbert** (ENG)

=== Quarter-finals ===
==== 7 February – 21:00 ====
- **Ryan Day** (WAL) **49**–6 David Gilbert (ENG)
- Robert Milkins (ENG) 21–**27** **Mark Selby** (ENG)
- Louis Heathcote (ENG) 37–**47** **Craig Steadman** (ENG)
- Martin O'Donnell (ENG) 13–**86** **Mark Williams** (WAL)

=== Semi-finals ===
==== 7 February – 22:15 ====
- Mark Williams (WAL) 18–**31** **Ryan Day** (WAL)
- **Mark Selby** (ENG) **43**–15 Craig Steadman (ENG) (Note: Craig Steadman was playing as an amateur and achieved his best ever ranking event finish with a surprise semi-final appearance.)

=== Final ===
Final: 1 frame. Referee: Andy Yates; Marshall Arena, Milton Keynes, England, 7 February 2021 – 22:45
**Ryan Day**; Wales	**67**–24	Mark Selby; England

== Century breaks ==
Total: 1

- 142 – Mark Allen
