= 2020 Q School =

Snooker tournaments

Tournament information
- Dates: 3–9 August 2020
- Venue: English Institute of Sport
- City: Sheffield
- Country: England
- Format: Qualifying School
- Qualifiers: 12 via the 3 events

The 2020 Q School was a series of three snooker tournaments held at the start of the 2020–21 snooker season. An event for amateur players, it served as a qualification event for a place on the professional World Snooker Tour for the following two seasons. The events took place in August 2020 at the English Institute of Sport in Sheffield, England with a total 12 players qualifying via the three tournaments.

== Format ==
Originally planned for June 2020, the series was delayed until August because of the COVID-19 pandemic. The 2020 Q School still consisted of three events but, rather than taking place one after the other, they were all played in a week. All first and second matches for all three events were played on the opening four days, and then the final stages were played on the next three days. The three events had 172 entries competing for 12 places on the main tour. Four players qualified from each of the three events. Rounds 1 and 2 were contested over 5 frames, with later rounds being played over seven frames.

== Event 1 ==
The first 2020 Q School event was held from 3 to 7 August 2020. Lee Walker, Peter Devlin, Simon Lichtenberg and Fan Zhengyi qualified. The results of the four final matches are given below.

- Lee Walker (WAL) 4–1 Simon Blackwell (ENG)
- Peter Devlin (ENG) 4–2 John Astley (ENG)
- Simon Lichtenberg (GER) 4–1 Leo Fernandez (IRL)
- Fan Zhengyi (CHN) 4–2 Michael White (WAL)

== Event 2 ==
The second 2020 Q School event was held from 4 to 8 August 2020. Jamie Jones, Zak Surety, Oliver Lines and Ben Hancorn qualified. The results of the four final matches are given below.

- Jamie Jones (WAL) 4–0 Michael Georgiou (CYP)
- Zak Surety (ENG) 4–1 Leo Fernandez (IRL)
- Oliver Lines (ENG) 4–2 Paul Davison (ENG)
- Ben Hancorn (ENG) 4–0 Kuldesh Johal (ENG)

== Event 3 ==
The third 2020 Q School event was held from 5 to 9 August 2020. Rory McLeod, Jamie Wilson, Farakh Ajaib and Steven Hallworth qualified. The results of the four final matches are given below.

- Rory McLeod (JAM) 4–2 Paul Davison (ENG)
- Jamie Wilson (ENG) 4–3 Haydon Pinhey (ENG)
- Farakh Ajaib (ENG) 4–2 Brian Ochoiski (FRA)
- Steven Hallworth (ENG) 4–2 Alfie Burden (ENG)

== Q School Order of Merit ==
A Q School Order of Merit was produced for players who failed to gain a place on the main tour. The Order of Merit was used to top up fields for the 2020–21 snooker season where an event failed to attract the required number of entries. The rankings in the Order of Merit were based on the number of frames won in the three Q School events. Players who received a bye into the second round were awarded three points for round one. Where players were equal, those who won the most frames in the first event were ranked higher and, if still equal, the player with most frames in event two.

The Order of Merit was intended to be used to give priority places for the new Q Tour which was announced in July 2020. However the tour was delayed by a year and only started in 2021–22.

The leading players in the Q School Order of Merit are given below.

Rank	Player	Event 1	Event 2	Event 3	Total
1	(Wales) Michael White	20	12	15	47
2	(France) Brian Ochoiski	10	17	20	47
3	(England) Paul Davison	7	20	20	47
4	(Republic of Ireland) Leo Fernandez	19	19	5	43
5	(England) Jamie Curtis-Barrett	13	17	12	42
6	(England) Kuldesh Johal	8	18	13	39
7	(England) Oliver Brown	13	8	17	38
8	(England) Daniel Womersley	9	12	16	37
9	(England) Haydon Pinhey	1	15	21	37
10	(England) John Astley	20	4	11	35

== Two-season performance of qualifiers ==
The following table shows the rankings of the 12 qualifiers from the 2020 Q School, at the end of the 2021–22 snooker season, the end of their two guaranteed seasons on the tour, together with their tour status for the 2022–23 snooker season. Players in the top-64 of the rankings retained their place on the tour while those outside the top-64 lost their place unless they qualified under a different category.

Player	End of 2021–22 season		Status for 2022–23 season
Player	Money	Ranking	Status for 2022–23 season
Lee Walker (WAL)	26,500	91	Amateur
Peter Devlin (ENG)	26,500	92	Amateur
Simon Lichtenberg (GER)	48,500	75	Amateur
Fan Zhengyi (CHN)	113,000	36	Retained place on tour
Jamie Jones (WAL)	129,500	31	Retained place on tour
Zak Surety (ENG)	20,500	101	Qualified through the 2022 Q School
Oliver Lines (ENG)	73,000	57	Retained place on tour
Ben Hancorn (ENG)	30,000	88	Amateur
Rory McLeod (JAM)	42,500	78	Amateur
Jamie Wilson (ENG)	22,000	100	Amateur
Farakh Ajaib (ENG)	22,500	99	Amateur
Steven Hallworth (ENG)	40,500	81	Amateur
