= Farakh Ajaib =

English professional snooker player

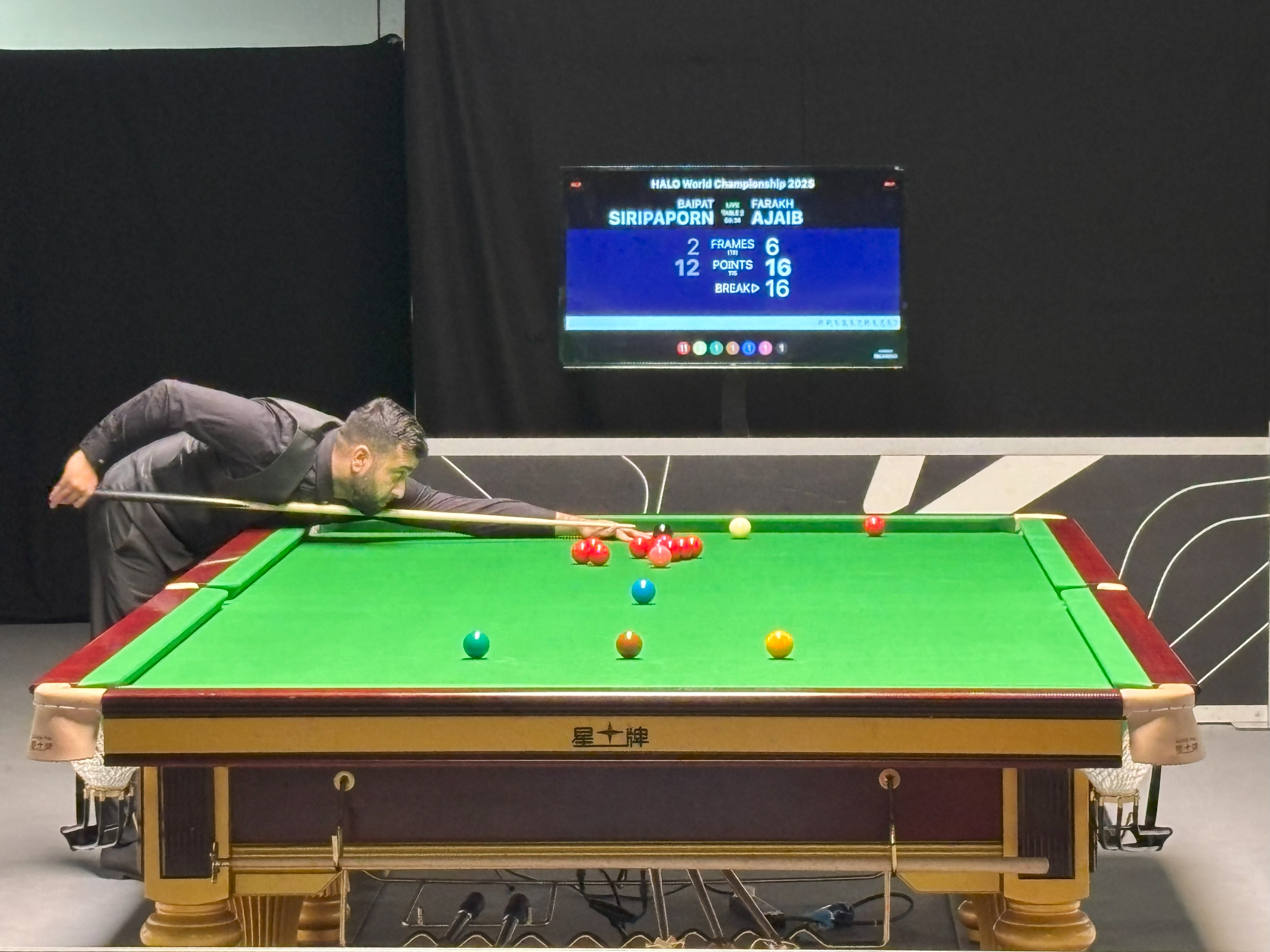

Personal information
- Born: 3 February 1991 (age 35) Blackburn, England

Sport
- Country: England (until 2021); Pakistan (since 2021)
- Sport: Snooker
- Professional: 2020–2022, 2024-2026
- Highest ranking: 76 (August 2025)
- Best ranking finish: Last 16 (2022 European Masters)

Farakh Ajaib (born 3 February 1991) is a former British Pakistani professional snooker player from Lancashire.

== Career ==
In 2018, Ajaib was crowned the inaugural East Lancashire Snooker Championship winner. He was a ‘top-up’ player for several main tour events in 2018/19 – reward for a solid 2018 Q School campaign. At the third event of the 2020 Q School at the English Institute of Sport in Sheffield, Ajaib clinched a two-year Tour Card on to the 2020–21 and 2021–22 snooker seasons.

At the 2020 English Open, Ajaib defeated Rod Lawler 4–0 before losing 4–3 to Zhou Yuelong in a close match described as a “marathon”.

Competing at the 2022 European Masters in August, 2022 Ajaib lost to Judd Trump in a deciding frame in a last 16 match in which Ajaib had trailed 4–2 but had left Trump needing three snookers at 4–4.

He was relegated from the tour in 2023 but regained his place the following year, coming through Q School with a final round win over Iulian Boiko to earn a two-year place starting from the 2024-25 snooker season.

In June 2025, He was drawn in the round-robin stage of the 2025 Championship League against Si Jiahui, Artemijs Žižins and Kayden Brierley, recording a win over Brierley and a draw with Si Jiahui and was the only player in the group to win a single frame against Zizins. He reached the last-32 of the 2025 Saudi Arabia Snooker Masters.

He was also drawn to face former world champion Judd Trump again at the 2025 Wuhan Open. He reached the last-64 of the 2025 Xi'an Grand Prix in September 2025, with a 5-4 win over Zhang Anda, recovering 54 point deficit in the decider to win on the final black. He recorded a victory on 11 December 2025 against Stephen Maguire at the 2025 Snooker Shoot Out. After dropping off the tour following the conclusion of the 2025-26 season, he entered Q School in May 2026, losing in event one to Joel Connolly of Northern Ireland. On 21 November 2026, Ajaib came from 5-2 down to beat Andrew Higginson 6-5 in the first qualifying round at the 2026 UK Championship.

== Performance and rankings timeline ==
Tournament	2010/ 11	2011/ 12	2016/ 17	2018/ 19	2020/ 21	2021/ 22	2022/ 23	2024/ 25	2025/ 26
Ranking (Note: It shows the ranking at the beginning of the season)	(Note: He was an amateur)				(Note: New players don't have a ranking)	89			85
Ranking tournaments
Championship League	Non-Ranking Event				RR	RR	RR	RR	RR
Saudi Arabia Masters	Tournament Not Held							2R	5R
Wuhan Open	Tournament Not Held							LQ	LQ
English Open	Not Held		A	1R	2R	LQ	A	LQ	LQ
British Open	Tournament Not Held					1R	A	LQ	LQ
Xi'an Grand Prix	Tournament Not Held							LQ	1R
Northern Ireland Open	Not Held		A	1R	1R	1R	WD	LQ	LQ
International Championship	Not Held		A	A	Not Held			LQ	LQ
UK Championship	A	A	A	A	1R	2R	LQ	LQ	LQ
Shoot Out	Non-Ranking		A	1R	1R	2R	1R	1R	2R
Scottish Open	Not Held		A	A	1R	LQ	A	1R	LQ
German Masters	A	A	A	LQ	LQ	LQ	A	LQ	LQ
World Grand Prix	Not Held		DNQ	DNQ	DNQ	DNQ	DNQ	DNQ	DNQ
Players Championship (Note: The event was called the Players Tour Championship Final (2010/2011–2011/2012))	DNQ	DNQ	DNQ	DNQ	DNQ	DNQ	DNQ	DNQ	DNQ
Welsh Open	A	A	A	A	1R	LQ	LQ	LQ	LQ
World Open	A	A	A	A	Not Held			LQ	LQ
Tour Championship	Not Held		DNQ	DNQ	DNQ	DNQ	DNQ	DNQ	DNQ
World Championship	A	A	A	LQ	LQ	LQ	LQ	LQ	LQ
Former ranking tournaments
Paul Hunter Classic	Minor-Rank		LQ	A	Tournament Not Held				
Riga Masters	Not Held		A	LQ	Tournament Not Held				
Indian Open	Not Held		A	LQ	Tournament Not Held				
WST Pro Series	Tournament Not Held				RR	Tournament Not Held			
Turkish Masters	Tournament Not Held					LQ	Not Held		
Gibraltar Open	Not Held		A	1R	1R	2R	Not Held		
European Masters	Not Held		A	A	1R	LQ	3R	Not Held	
WST Classic	Tournament Not Held						1R	Not Held	

Performance Table Legend
LQ	lost in the qualifying draw	#R	lost in the early rounds of the tournament (WR = Wildcard round, RR = Round robin)	QF	lost in the quarter-finals
SF	lost in the semi-finals	F	lost in the final	W	won the tournament
DNQ	did not qualify for the tournament	A	did not participate in the tournament	WD	withdrew from the tournament

NH / Not Held	means an event was not held
NR / Non-Ranking Event	means an event is/was no longer a ranking event
R / Ranking Event	means an event is/was a ranking event
MR / Minor-Ranking Event	means an event is/was a minor-ranking event

== Career finals ==
=== Amateur finals: 3 (1 title) ===
Outcome	No.	Year	Championship	Opponent in the final	Score
Runner-up	1	2009	PIOS – Event 5	(Scotland) Anthony McGill	0–6
Winner	1.	2022	Q Tour – Event 3	(England) Harvey Chandler	5–3
Runner-up	2.	2026	Q Tour – Event 1	(England) Sanderson Lam	1–4
