= Ben Hancorn =

English professional snooker player

Personal information
- Born: 24 May 1982 (age 44) Bristol, England

Sport
- Country: England
- Sport: Snooker
- Professional: 2020–2022
- Highest ranking: 84 (August 2021)
- Best ranking finish: Quarter-finals (2022 Gibraltar Open)

Ben Hancorn (born 24 May 1982) is an English former professional snooker player. He played on the World Snooker Tour from 2020 to 2022. In 2023, he was a semi-finalist of the World Seniors Snooker Championship.

== Career ==
In 2008, Hancorn was the runner up in the English Amateur Championship, losing the final to David Grace. Following this defeat Hancorn stopped playing snooker for a near 10-year hiatus before taking part again in the Challenge Tour.

In February 2020, Hancorn overcame Rory McLeod 5–3 in the final of the English Amateur Championship at the Centaur Arena in Cheltenham.

At the second event of the 2020 Q School at the English Institute of Sport in Sheffield, Hancorn beat the likes of Dean Reynolds and Chen Feilong, before seeing off Kuldesh Johal in the final round. With these wins Hancorn clinched a two-year Tour Card for the 2020–21 and 2021–22 snooker seasons.

In October 2020 Hancorn beat both Sean Maddocks and Thepchaiya Un-Nooh at the English Open to clinch his first 2 professional victories, before losing against Welshman Jak Jones in the round of 32. Hancorn was a surprise package at the 2021 WST Pro Series round robin first round with 6 consecutive victories, including a win against Ronnie O'Sullivan. He reached the last-32 of the 2021 Snooker Shoot Out where he lost to eventual tournament winner Ryan Day. He defeated former top-16 player Joe Perry on his way to the last-32 of the 2021 British Open. He also reached the last-32 of the 2021 Scottish Open, with a 4-1 defeat of Si Jiahui. He was a quarter-finalist at the 2022 Gibraltar Open, where his run was ended by Robert Milkins.

In May 2023 Hancorn beat Peter Lines and Gerard Greene to reach the semi-final of the World Seniors Snooker Championship held at the Crucible Theatre, Sheffield. He was beaten at the semi-final stage by Alfie Burden.

== Performance and rankings timeline ==
Tournament	2002/ 03	2003/ 04	2004/ 05	2018/ 19	2020/ 21	2021/ 22	2022/ 23
Ranking (Note: It shows the ranking at the beginning of the season.)	(Note: He was an amateur)				(Note: New players on the Main Tour don't have a ranking)	84	
Ranking tournaments
Championship League	Not Held			NR	RR	RR	RR
European Masters (Note: The event was called the European Open (2002/2003-2003/2004) and the Malta Cup (2004/2005))	A	A	A	A	1R	LQ	A
British Open	A	A	A	Not Held		3R	A
Northern Ireland Open	Not Held			A	1R	LQ	A
UK Championship	A	A	A	A	1R	1R	A
Scottish Open (Note: The event was called the Players Championship (2003/2004))	A	A	NH	A	1R	3R	A
English Open	Not Held			A	3R	LQ	A
World Grand Prix	Not Held			A	DNQ	DNQ	DNQ
Shoot Out	Not Held			1R	3R	1R	A
German Masters	Not Held			A	LQ	LQ	A
Welsh Open	A	A	A	A	1R	1R	A
Players Championship	Not Held			DNQ	DNQ	DNQ	DNQ
Tour Championship	Not Held			DNQ	DNQ	DNQ	DNQ
World Championship	LQ	LQ	LQ	A	LQ	LQ	A
Former ranking tournaments
Indian Open	Not Held			LQ	Not Held		
WST Pro Series	Tournament Not Held				2R	Not Held	
Turkish Masters	Not Held					LQ	NH
Gibraltar Open	Not Held			A	1R	QF	NH
Former non-ranking tournaments
Merseyside Professional Championship	A	1R	1R	Tournament Not Held			

Performance Table Legend
LQ	lost in the qualifying draw	#R	lost in the early rounds of the tournament (WR = Wildcard round, RR = Round robin)	QF	lost in the quarter-finals
SF	lost in the semi-finals	F	lost in the final	W	won the tournament
DNQ	did not qualify for the tournament	A	did not participate in the tournament	WD	withdrew from the tournament

NH / Not Held	means an event was not held.
NR / Non-Ranking Event	means an event is/was no longer a ranking event.
R / Ranking Event	means an event is/was a ranking event.
MR / Minor-Ranking Event	means an event is/was a minor-ranking event.

== Career finals ==
=== Amateur finals: 3 (1 title) ===
Outcome	No.	Year	Championship	Opponent in the final	Score
Runner-up	1.	2008	English Amateur Championship	(England) David Grace	7–9
Runner-up	2.	2018	Challenge Tour – Event 6	(England) David Grace	0–3
Winner	1.	2020	English Amateur Championship	(Jamaica) Rory McLeod	5–3
