= Jamie Wilson (snooker player) =

English professional snooker player

Personal information
- Born: 11 November 2003 (age 22) Havant, England

Sport
- Country: England
- Sport: Snooker
- Professional: 2020–2022
- Highest ranking: 83 (August 2021)
- Best ranking finish: Last 64 (x5)

Jamie Wilson (born 11 November 2003) is a former professional snooker player from Havant in Hampshire. He played on the World Snooker Tour on a two-year Tour Card from the 2020–21 snooker season having earned a spot at Q School in 2020.

== Career ==
At the third event of the 2020 Q School at the English Institute of Sport in Sheffield, Wilson clinched a two-year Tour Card on to the 2020–21 and 2021-22 snooker seasons. Wilson defeated former-professionals David Finbow and Fang Xiongman in deciding frames, as well as former-professional Michael Georgiou, to reach the final round where he squeezed past Haydon Pinhey on the colours in another final frame decider. Aged just 16, Wilson was the youngest qualifier in 2020, and the youngest English player to ever qualify through Q School.

Wilson made his professional debut at the 2020 Championship League, earning a credible 2-2 draw with Mark Allen. He also drew with Billy Joe Castle and finished third in his four-man round robin group. He secured his first win as a professional against Lukas Kleckers at the 2021 Snooker Shoot Out, He came from 3-1 down to win 4–3 against Duane Jones at Celtic Manor in the 2021 Welsh Open. His performances at the 2021 WST Pro Series round robin first round in March 2021, included a win against Mark Joyce, and a defeat to Ronnie O'Sullivan.

After dropping off the World Snooker Tour, he continued to play club snooker in Waterlooville, Hampshire.

== Personal life ==
From Hampshire, he attended Park Community School in Havant. He started playing snooker at the age of six years-old. He played amateur snooker in Chandlers Ford. His parents Suzy and Steve, run a sports bar in Waterlooville (Waterlooville Sports Bar) which opened in 2016 and is where Wilson would play cue sports. He had Tim Dunkley as a coach from 2017.

== Performance and rankings timeline ==
Tournament	2020/ 21	2021/ 22
Ranking (Note: It shows the ranking at the beginning of the season.)	(Note: New players don't have a ranking.)	83
Ranking tournaments
Championship League	RR	RR
British Open	NH	1R
Northern Ireland Open	1R	LQ
English Open	1R	1R
UK Championship	1R	1R
Scottish Open	1R	LQ
World Grand Prix	DNQ	DNQ
Shoot Out	2R	1R
German Masters	LQ	LQ
Players Championship	DNQ	DNQ
European Masters	1R	LQ
Welsh Open	2R	LQ
Turkish Masters	NH	LQ
Gibraltar Open	2R	2R
Tour Championship	DNQ	DNQ
World Championship	LQ	LQ
Ranking tournaments
WST Pro Series	RR	NH

Performance Table Legend
LQ	lost in the qualifying draw	#R	lost in the early rounds of the tournament (WR = Wildcard round, RR = Round robin)	QF	lost in the quarter-finals
SF	lost in the semi-finals	F	lost in the final	W	won the tournament
DNQ	did not qualify for the tournament	A	did not participate in the tournament	WD	withdrew from the tournament

NH / Not Held	means an event was not held.
NR / Non-Ranking Event	means an event is/was no longer a ranking event.
R / Ranking Event	means an event is/was a ranking event.
MR / Minor-Ranking Event	means an event is/was a minor-ranking event.
