= Peter Devlin (snooker player) =

English professional snooker player

Personal information
- Nickname: Devastating Devlin
- Born: 10 August 1996 (age 30) London, England

Sport
- Country: England
- Sport: Snooker
- Professional: 2020–2022
- Highest ranking: 80 (November 2021)
- Best ranking finish: Last 16

Peter Devlin (born 10 August 1996) is an English former professional snooker player, rapper, presenter and MC from Leyton in East London.

== Snooker career ==
Devlin was crowned the 2016 England Under-21 Champion as a 19 year old, following a victory over Richard Haney by an 8-6 margin in the final, and a 107 break to seal the match. Other notable wins in the event included a semi final win over Louis Heathcote.

Devlin finished high enough in the 2018 Q School Order of Merit to earn a place for some ranking events. Competing at the 2019 Snooker Shoot Out Devlin won as an amateur against professional Ross Muir 35–16, before losing to experienced player Rory McLeod who also beat Joe Perry and Jimmy White in that tournament.

At the first event of the 2020 Q School played at the English Institute of Sport in Sheffield, Devlin beat Mark Vincent, Jake Nicholson, Thor Chuan Leong and Kuldesh Johal, before seeing off John Astley in the final round. With these wins Devlin clinched a two-year Tour Card for the 2020-21 and 2021–22 snooker seasons.

At the 2020 European Masters, Devlin got his first victory of the season, with a 5–3 win over Zak Surety. He then went on to beat 3 time World Champion Mark Williams live on TV 5–4, with a century break in the decider. Devlin followed it up with another deciding frame victory against Joe O'Connor, before losing out to Martin Gould 5–3 in the Last 16.

At the 2021 Snooker Shoot Out Devlin defeated top 16 player Jack Lisowski before performing an impromptu rap live on Eurosport for presenter Andy Goldstein and acting pundit Ronnie O'Sullivan.

== Personal life ==
Devlin practises in East London and is a fan of Leyton Orient.

A keen singer, rapper, comedian and songwriter, Devlin has performed and produced songs about losing football bets, Love Island, the COVID-19 pandemic, the mainstream media and political correctness as well as a rap/snooker crossover parody song of Man's Not Hot by Big Shaq entitled Man’s Long Pot. He has a total of over 1 million views for his songs on social media.

In 2022, Devlin performed the hit single “Bang Bang” as a guest alongside pop star Jessie J, in a live concert in London. Devlin highlighted this as one of his most memorable experiences.

Devlin is also an ambassador for a charity, Silence of Suicide, aiming to raise awareness for mental health and suicide, especially in sports such as snooker. The charity aims to launch a 24/7 helpline for anyone to use, if they feel they need to talk to someone.

As well as playing on the World Snooker Tour, Devlin has also worked as a commentator, as a reporter and presenter for Eurosport, and as an MC for various events. He was a participant on BBC quiz show The Finish Line.

On 27 October 2021 he appeared on Winning Combination.

== Performance and rankings timeline ==
Tournament	2017/ 18	2018/ 19	2019/ 20	2020/ 21	2021/ 22	2022/ 23
Ranking (Note: It shows the ranking at the beginning of the season)	(Note: He was an amateur)			(Note: New players on the Main Tour don't have a ranking)	81	
Ranking tournaments
Championship League	Non-Ranking Event			RR	RR	RR
European Masters	A	A	A	4R	LQ	A
British Open	Tournament Not Held				1R	A
Northern Ireland Open	A	A	A	1R	1R	A
UK Championship	A	A	A	1R	1R	A
Scottish Open	A	A	A	2R	LQ	A
English Open	A	A	A	1R	1R	A
World Grand Prix	DNQ	DNQ	DNQ	DNQ	DNQ	DNQ
Shoot Out	A	2R	A	2R	1R	A
German Masters	A	A	A	LQ	LQ	A
Welsh Open	A	A	A	1R	LQ	A
Players Championship	DNQ	DNQ	DNQ	DNQ	DNQ	DNQ
WST Classic	Not Held					1R
Tour Championship	NH	DNQ	DNQ	DNQ	DNQ	DNQ
World Championship	A	A	A	LQ	LQ	
Former ranking tournaments
Paul Hunter Classic	LQ	LQ	NR	Tournament Not Held		
WST Pro Series	Tournament Not Held			RR	Not Held	
Turkish Masters	Tournament Not Held				LQ	NH
Gibraltar Open	LQ	LQ	1R	1R	1R	NH

Performance Table Legend
LQ	lost in the qualifying draw	#R	lost in the early rounds of the tournament (WR = Wildcard round, RR = Round robin)	QF	lost in the quarter-finals
SF	lost in the semi-finals	F	lost in the final	W	won the tournament
DNQ	did not qualify for the tournament	A	did not participate in the tournament	WD	withdrew from the tournament

NH / Not Held	means an event was not held.
NR / Non-Ranking Event	means an event is/was no longer a ranking event.
R / Ranking Event	means an event is/was a ranking event.
MR / Minor-Ranking Event	means an event is/was a minor-ranking event.
