= Iulian Boiko =

Ukrainian professional snooker player

Personal information
- Nickname: The Kiev Dynamo
- Born: 22 September 2005 (age 21) Kyiv, Ukraine

Sport
- Country: Ukraine
- Sport: Snooker
- Professional: 2020–2022, 2025–present
- Highest ranking: 68 (4 October 2026)
- Current ranking: 68 (as of 4 October 2026)
- Best ranking finish: Semi-final (2025 Shoot Out)

Iulian Serhiyovych Boiko (Ukrainian: Юліан Сергійович Бойко; born 22 September 2005) is a Ukrainian professional snooker player.

== Career ==
In May 2019, Boiko registered his first official century break in a 4–3 defeat against Billy Joe Castle in the second event of the 2019 Q School.

In January 2020, Boiko finished as runner-up in the WSF Open, as a result, he was awarded a two-year card on the World Snooker Tour for the 2020–21 and 2021–22. As a 14 year old, he became the youngest ever professional player. In March 2020, Boiko defeated Darren Morgan, a former professional player, by 5–3 in the final to become the EBSA European 6-Reds champion for the first time. Later in 2020, he participated at the qualifying stages of the World Championship, the youngest player to do so, but he was eliminated by Thor Chuan Leong in the first qualifying round, losing 6–3.

On 4 March 2021, Boiko won his first professional match in Gibraltar Open against Fergal O'Brien, winning 4–3.

== Performance and rankings timeline ==
Tournament	2017/ 18	2018/ 19	2019/ 20	2020/ 21	2021/ 22	2022/ 23	2023/ 24	2024/ 25	2025/ 26	2026/ 27
Ranking (Note: It shows the ranking at the beginning of the season.)	(Note: He was an amateur)			(Note: New players on the Main Tour don't have a ranking)	90					71
Ranking tournaments
Championship League	Non-Ranking			RR	RR	A	A	RR	RR	2R
China Open	A	A	Tournament Not Held							LQ
Wuhan Open	Tournament Not Held						A	1R	LQ	LQ
British Open	Tournament Not Held				1R	A	A	2R	2R	3R
English Open	A	A	A	1R	LQ	A	A	LQ	LQ	LQ
Shenzhen Open (Note: The event was called the Xi'an Grand Prix (2024/2025–2025/2026))	Tournament Not Held							LQ	LQ	LQ
Northern Ireland Open	A	A	A	1R	LQ	A	A	LQ	LQ	LQ
International Championship	A	A	A	Not Held			A	LQ	LQ	LQ
UK Championship	A	A	A	1R	1R	A	LQ	LQ	LQ	
Shoot Out	A	A	1R	1R	1R	A	4R	2R	SF	
Scottish Open	A	A	A	1R	1R	A	LQ	LQ	LQ	
German Masters	A	A	LQ	LQ	LQ	A	LQ	LQ	LQ	
Welsh Open	A	A	A	1R	1R	A	1R	LQ	LQ	
World Grand Prix	DNQ	DNQ	DNQ	DNQ	DNQ	DNQ	DNQ	DNQ	DNQ	
Players Championship	DNQ	DNQ	DNQ	DNQ	DNQ	DNQ	DNQ	DNQ	DNQ	
World Open	A	A	A	Not Held			1R	LQ	1R	
Tour Championship	NH	DNQ	DNQ	DNQ	DNQ	DNQ	DNQ	DNQ	DNQ	
World Championship	A	A	LQ	LQ	LQ	LQ	LQ	LQ	LQ	
Former ranking tournaments
Paul Hunter Classic	A	1R	NR	Tournament Not Held						
WST Pro Series	Not Held			RR	Tournament Not Held					
Turkish Masters	Tournament Not Held				1R	Tournament Not Held				
Gibraltar Open	LQ	LQ	A	2R	2R	Tournament Not Held				
European Masters	A	A	A	1R	LQ	A	LQ	Not Held		
Saudi Arabia Masters	Tournament Not Held							1R	5R	NH
Former non-ranking tournaments
Paul Hunter Classic	Ranking		1R	Tournament Not Held						

Performance Table Legend
LQ	lost in the qualifying draw	#R	lost in the early rounds of the tournament (WR = Wildcard round, RR = Round robin)	QF	lost in the quarter-finals
SF	lost in the semi-finals	F	lost in the final	W	won the tournament
DNQ	did not qualify for the tournament	A	did not participate in the tournament	WD	withdrew from the tournament

NH / Not Held	means an event was not held.
NR / Non-Ranking Event	means an event is/was no longer a ranking event.
R / Ranking Event	means an event is/was a ranking event.
MR / Minor-Ranking Event	means an event is/was a minor-ranking event.

== Career finals ==
=== Amateur finals: 6 (4 titles) ===
Outcome	No.	Year	Championship	Opponent in the final	Score
Runner-up	1.	2020	WSF Open	(England) Ashley Hugill	3–5
Winner	1.	2020	EBSA European 6-Reds Championship	(Wales) Darren Morgan	5–3
Runner-up	2.	2023	EBSA European Under-21 Snooker Championship	(Scotland) Liam Graham	2–5
Winner	2.	2023	EBSA European Snooker Shoot-Out	(Israel) Shachar Ruberg	1–0 (44–33)
Winner	3.	2024	EBSA European Snooker Shoot-Out	(England) Craig Steadman	1–0 (49–5)
Winner	4.	2025	EBSA European Under-21 Snooker Championship	(England) Oliver Sykes	5–4

=== Team finals: 1 (1 title) ===
Outcome	No.	Year	Championship	Team	Opponent	Score	Ref.
Winner	1.	2024	EBSA European Team Snooker Championship	Ukraine 1 with Denys Khmelevskyi	Malta 1 Aaron Busuttil; Chris Peplow	3–2	

== Personal life ==
Boiko is the son of Serhii Boiko, who is responsible for creating and overseeing the Ukrainian Snooker Federation.
