= 2020–21 snooker world rankings =

| Preceded by 2019–20 | 2020–2021 | Succeeded by 2021–22 |

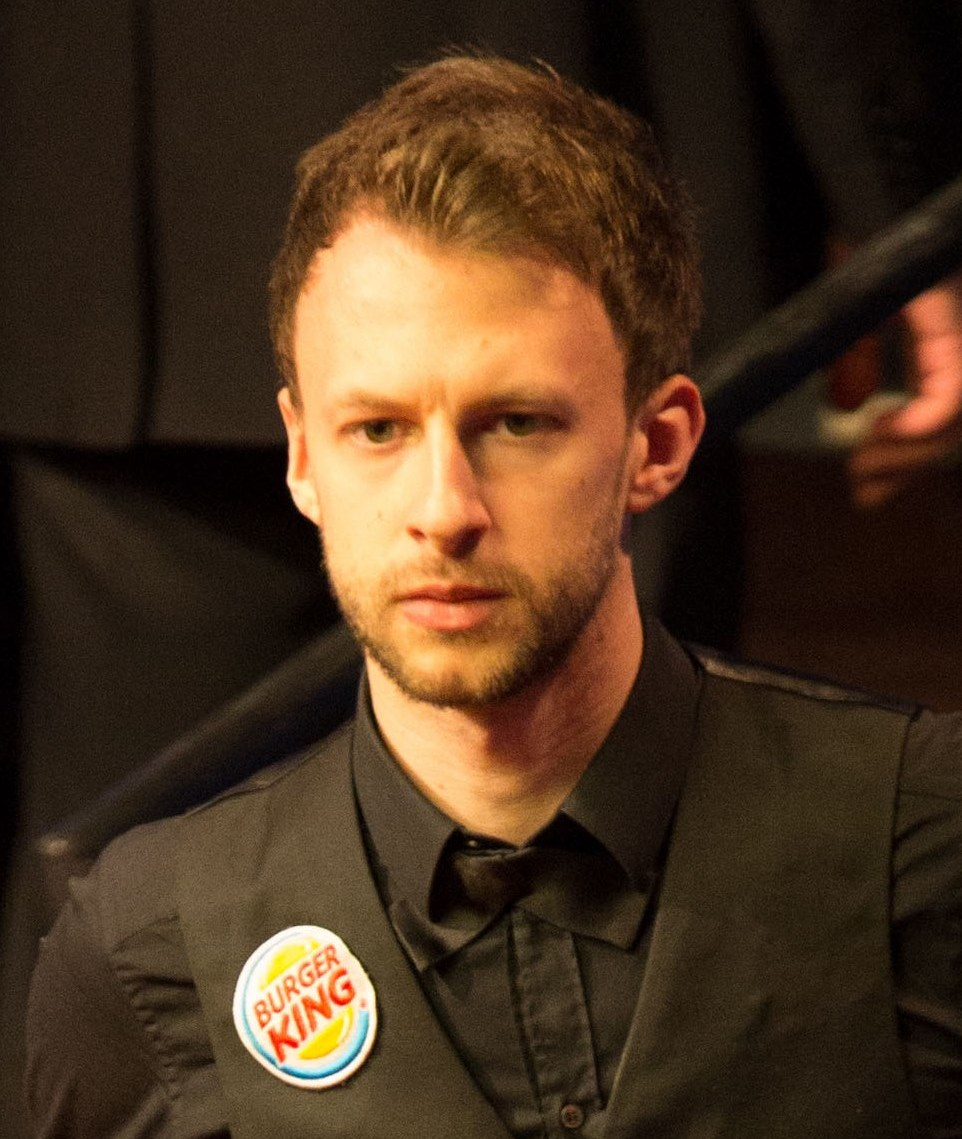
Judd Trump (pictured in 2015) was ranked as the world number one throughout the season.

The sport of professional snooker has had a world ranking system in place since 1976. Certain tournaments were given ranking status, with the results at those events contributing to a player's world ranking. The events that made up the 1976–77 snooker season were the first to use ranking points, awarding points from earlier seasons. Originally, the world rankings were decided based only on results in the World Snooker Championship, but other events were later added. The system used for the 2020–21 snooker season was first used in the 2010–11 season, where players were awarded ranking points based entirely on prize money won from these events. The rankings are based on the prior two seasons, with ten revisions after specific tournaments throughout the season. These revisions are used as official rankings, with points awarded in the current season overwriting those from two years prior.

Judd Trump began the season as the world number one and retained the position throughout, as he won five ranking events. Trump began the season with a lead of over 500,000 points, ahead of 2020 World Snooker Championship winner Ronnie O'Sullivan in second, and finished the season in first, above 2021 World Snooker Championship winner Mark Selby by 124,000 points.

== Ranking list ==
=== Revision dates ===
Seedings for each event were based on the world rankings, with totals being updated at specific revision dates. On these dates, ranking points from the 2018–19 snooker season were removed from a player's total.

Revision dates
| Revision point | Date | After | 2018/2019 points dropped |
|---|---|---|---|
| 1 | 28 September 2020 | European Masters | Riga Masters; World Open; Paul Hunter Classic |
| 2 | 31 October 2020 | Championship League | China Championship; European Masters; English Open; International Championship |
| 3 | 23 November 2020 | Northern Ireland Open | Northern Ireland Open |
| 4 | 7 December 2020 | UK Championship | UK Championship |
| 5 | 21 December 2020 | World Grand Prix | Scottish Open |
| 6 | 8 February 2021 | Shoot Out | German Masters; World Grand Prix; Shoot Out |
| 7 | 22 February 2021 | Welsh Open | Welsh Open |
| 8 | 29 March 2021 | Tour Championship | Indian Open; Players Championship; Gibraltar Open; China Open; Tour Championship |
| Total | 4 May 2021 | World Championship | World Championship |

=== Seeding list ===
The following table contains the rankings which were used to determine the seedings for following tournaments. Other provisional and unofficial rankings are produced after each ranking event which are not noted here. Blank fields indicate that the player was not active on the tour, or had no ranking. The names are initially sorted by the scores at the end of the season.

Seeding list
| Name | Start (Note: Seeding revision 0 was used for the seeding of the Championship League and the European Masters.) | | Revision 1 (Note: Seeding revision 1 was used for the seeding of the English Open.) | | Revision 2 (Note: Seeding revision 2 was used for the seeding of the Northern Ireland Open, the German Masters and the UK Championship.) | | Revision 3 (Note: Seeding revision 3 was used for the seeding of the Scottish Open.) | | Revision 4 (Note: Seeding revision 4 was used for the seeding of the Masters.) | | Revision 5 (Note: Seeding revision 5 was used for the seeding of the WST Pro Series.) | | Revision 6 (Note: Seeding revision 6 was used for the seeding of the Welsh Open.) | | Revision 7 (Note: Seeding revision 7 was used for the seeding of the Gibraltar Open.) | | Revision 8 (Note: Seeding revision 8 was used for the seeding of the World Championship.) | | Total | |
| Name | Pos | Points | Pos | Points | Pos | Points | Pos | Points | Pos | Points | Pos | Points | Pos | Points | Pos | Points | Pos | Points | Pos | Points |
|---|---|---|---|---|---|---|---|---|---|---|---|---|---|---|---|---|---|---|---|---|
| Judd Trump | 1 | 1,648,500 | 1 | 1,658,000 | 1 | 1,699,500 | 1 | 1,699,500 | 1 | 1,764,500 | 1 | 1,854,500 | 1 | 1,824,500 | 1 | 1,826,000 | 1 | 1,820,000 | 1 | 1,370,000 |
| Mark Selby | 4 | 722,000 | 4 | 789,000 | 4 | 637,000 | 5 | 620,000 | 4 | 644,500 | 4 | 734,500 | 4 | 737,000 | 4 | 741,000 | 4 | 776,000 | 2 | 1,246,000 |
| Ronnie O'Sullivan | 2 | 1,101,000 | 2 | 1,104,000 | 2 | 1,088,000 | 2 | 1,088,000 | 3 | 924,500 | 3 | 974,500 | 3 | 969,500 | 2 | 996,000 | 2 | 831,000 | 3 | 861,000 |
| Neil Robertson | 3 | 965,000 | 3 | 918,000 | 3 | 858,500 | 3 | 858,000 | 2 | 1,043,000 | 2 | 1,040,500 | 2 | 1,025,500 | 3 | 955,500 | 3 | 785,500 | 4 | 785,500 |
| Shaun Murphy | 8 | 481,000 | 8 | 495,500 | 6 | 488,000 | 7 | 488,000 | 7 | 494,500 | 7 | 468,500 | 7 | 463,500 | 7 | 471,000 | 7 | 473,500 | 5 | 643,500 |
| Kyren Wilson | 6 | 621,500 | 6 | 593,500 | 5 | 622,500 | 4 | 626,500 | 5 | 628,500 | 5 | 645,000 | 5 | 554,500 | 5 | 556,000 | 6 | 561,000 | 6 | 611,000 |
| John Higgins | 7 | 534,500 | 7 | 534,500 | 7 | 484,500 | 6 | 492,000 | 6 | 504,000 | 6 | 508,500 | 6 | 504,000 | 6 | 498,000 | 5 | 588,000 | 7 | 418,000 |
| Ding Junhui | 12 | 399,750 | 10 | 402,750 | 10 | 389,250 | 10 | 399,250 | 10 | 390,750 | 9 | 402,250 | 9 | 394,750 | 9 | 391,750 | 9 | 386,750 | 8 | 356,750 |
| Stephen Maguire | 9 | 478,500 | 9 | 459,500 | 9 | 428,000 | 9 | 432,000 | 8 | 421,500 | 8 | 421,500 | 8 | 398,000 | 8 | 418,000 | 8 | 397,000 | 9 | 347,000 |
| Yan Bingtao | 15 | 328,500 | 12 | 330,000 | 13 | 303,000 | 12 | 313,000 | 11 | 309,500 | 11 | 313,500 | 12 | 303,500 | 12 | 311,000 | 10 | 299,000 | 10 | 314,000 |
| Mark Williams | 10 | 447,750 | 14 | 297,750 | 14 | 277,250 | 14 | 277,750 | 14 | 274,750 | 15 | 282,250 | 14 | 275,250 | 13 | 292,750 | 12 | 286,250 | 11 | 306,250 |
| Mark Allen | 5 | 659,500 | 5 | 653,500 | 8 | 462,500 | 8 | 466,500 | 9 | 398,000 | 10 | 335,500 | 10 | 333,000 | 10 | 337,000 | 13 | 272,000 | 12 | 302,000 |
| Barry Hawkins | 17 | 258,250 | 20 | 228,250 | 21 | 206,750 | 21 | 209,750 | 23 | 211,750 | 18 | 226,750 | 17 | 222,750 | 18 | 226,750 | 11 | 292,750 | 13 | 292,750 |
| Jack Lisowski | 14 | 333,250 | 15 | 288,250 | 16 | 238,250 | 16 | 234,750 | 15 | 244,250 | 14 | 284,750 | 11 | 310,750 | 11 | 312,250 | 14 | 251,250 | 14 | 281,250 |
| Stuart Bingham | 13 | 385,500 | 11 | 391,500 | 11 | 313,000 | 11 | 316,000 | 13 | 293,000 | 12 | 308,000 | 13 | 301,500 | 14 | 271,500 | 18 | 211,000 | 15 | 281,000 |
| Anthony McGill | 22 | 215,000 | 21 | 219,500 | 20 | 209,500 | 20 | 212,500 | 17 | 229,500 | 17 | 237,000 | 16 | 240,000 | 16 | 244,000 | 16 | 227,000 | 16 | 257,000 |
| Zhou Yuelong | 25 | 193,250 | 25 | 191,750 | 24 | 192,250 | 25 | 189,250 | 20 | 219,250 | 21 | 219,750 | 18 | 221,750 | 17 | 226,750 | 17 | 222,750 | 17 | 207,750 |
| Graeme Dott | 21 | 220,250 | 22 | 217,250 | 22 | 206,250 | 22 | 206,250 | 22 | 213,250 | 23 | 207,250 | 22 | 207,250 | 22 | 210,250 | 21 | 204,250 | 18 | 199,250 |
| Thepchaiya Un-Nooh | 20 | 248,225 | 18 | 242,500 | 15 | 241,000 | 15 | 238,500 | 16 | 240,000 | 16 | 243,000 | 20 | 213,000 | 21 | 210,500 | 19 | 208,000 | 19 | 188,000 |
| Joe Perry | 16 | 276,500 | 16 | 259,500 | 18 | 219,500 | 19 | 222,500 | 18 | 224,500 | 19 | 221,000 | 19 | 217,000 | 19 | 217,500 | 20 | 207,500 | 20 | 187,500 |
| Kurt Maflin | 27 | 181,100 | 28 | 175,000 | 27 | 172,000 | 26 | 179,500 | 25 | 186,500 | 25 | 186,500 | 24 | 182,000 | 27 | 172,000 | 25 | 164,000 | 21 | 169,000 |
| Tom Ford | 24 | 198,750 | 23 | 199,750 | 23 | 192,750 | 24 | 192,250 | 28 | 157,250 | 29 | 160,250 | 27 | 169,250 | 26 | 176,750 | 24 | 178,250 | 22 | 163,250 |
| David Gilbert | 11 | 401,000 | 13 | 328,500 | 12 | 309,500 | 13 | 299,500 | 12 | 296,000 | 13 | 293,500 | 15 | 249,500 | 15 | 253,500 | 15 | 232,500 | 23 | 162,500 |
| Ali Carter | 19 | 256,000 | 17 | 248,000 | 19 | 209,500 | 18 | 223,500 | 21 | 213,500 | 22 | 210,500 | 26 | 170,000 | 24 | 180,000 | 23 | 186,000 | 24 | 156,000 |
| Martin Gould | 53 | 107,250 | 36 | 142,250 | 34 | 131,250 | 31 | 138,750 | 33 | 133,750 | 32 | 146,250 | 31 | 143,750 | 31 | 147,750 | 27 | 151,250 | 25 | 151,250 |
| Zhao Xintong | 29 | 177,250 | 29 | 169,250 | 29 | 137,250 | 29 | 144,750 | 30 | 151,250 | 28 | 163,250 | 30 | 157,250 | 30 | 150,250 | 26 | 154,750 | 26 | 149,750 |
| Liang Wenbo | 35 | 158,500 | 33 | 155,500 | 30 | 136,000 | 30 | 140,000 | 29 | 152,000 | 30 | 156,000 | 28 | 158,000 | 29 | 155,500 | 29 | 137,500 | 27 | 142,500 |
| Ryan Day | 37 | 147,750 | 37 | 141,250 | 40 | 112,250 | 41 | 106,250 | 42 | 106,250 | 47 | 96,250 | 32 | 141,250 | 32 | 145,250 | 30 | 136,250 | 28 | 141,250 |
| Xiao Guodong | 31 | 161,600 | 35 | 142,500 | 33 | 131,500 | 35 | 131,000 | 31 | 138,000 | 35 | 138,000 | 41 | 116,500 | 40 | 120,500 | 31 | 134,000 | 29 | 139,000 |
| Matthew Selt | 26 | 186,350 | 27 | 175,750 | 26 | 172,250 | 27 | 176,250 | 26 | 177,750 | 26 | 180,750 | 25 | 177,250 | 25 | 178,750 | 32 | 131,750 | 30 | 136,750 |
| Michael Holt | 30 | 174,500 | 30 | 167,500 | 28 | 163,000 | 28 | 167,000 | 27 | 168,500 | 27 | 170,000 | 29 | 157,500 | 28 | 157,500 | 28 | 146,000 | 31 | 136,000 |
| Ricky Walden | 46 | 128,750 | 48 | 109,750 | 46 | 101,750 | 46 | 101,750 | 39 | 118,750 | 37 | 128,750 | 38 | 127,250 | 37 | 128,750 | 35 | 119,250 | 32 | 129,250 |
| Gary Wilson | 18 | 258,100 | 19 | 237,500 | 17 | 234,500 | 17 | 231,000 | 19 | 221,000 | 20 | 221,000 | 21 | 212,000 | 20 | 212,500 | 22 | 204,000 | 33 | 124,000 |
| Scott Donaldson | 23 | 206,250 | 24 | 197,750 | 25 | 187,750 | 23 | 194,250 | 24 | 189,250 | 24 | 186,750 | 23 | 186,750 | 23 | 180,750 | 33 | 126,750 | 34 | 121,750 |
| Lu Ning | 51 | 110,250 | 50 | 109,250 | 39 | 114,250 | 40 | 111,250 | 32 | 136,250 | 33 | 144,250 | 33 | 141,250 | 33 | 141,250 | 36 | 116,250 | 35 | 116,250 |
| Matthew Stevens | 33 | 160,750 | 31 | 160,750 | 31 | 134,750 | 33 | 135,250 | 35 | 130,250 | 39 | 127,250 | 39 | 119,250 | 39 | 122,250 | 34 | 124,750 | 36 | 109,750 |
| Robert Milkins | 49 | 115,100 | 53 | 103,000 | 53 | 88,500 | 51 | 91,500 | 46 | 98,500 | 42 | 107,500 | 44 | 106,500 | 42 | 109,500 | 40 | 109,500 | 37 | 109,500 |
| Li Hang | 44 | 132,500 | 43 | 129,500 | 36 | 136,500 | 37 | 120,500 | 37 | 127,500 | 31 | 147,500 | 35 | 139,500 | 34 | 139,500 | 37 | 113,500 | 38 | 108,500 |
| Luca Brecel | 38 | 147,500 | 38 | 141,000 | 32 | 133,500 | 34 | 131,500 | 36 | 128,000 | 38 | 127,500 | 37 | 130,500 | 36 | 130,500 | 47 | 88,500 | 39 | 103,500 |
| Jordan Brown | | 0 | 105 | 3,000 | 97 | 10,000 | 98 | 10,000 | 93 | 16,500 | 90 | 19,500 | 81 | 30,000 | 45 | 100,000 | 43 | 101,000 | 40 | 101,000 |
| Hossein Vafaei | 41 | 137,500 | 39 | 140,500 | 37 | 123,000 | 36 | 123,000 | 38 | 125,000 | 34 | 140,500 | 34 | 140,500 | 38 | 128,000 | 39 | 110,000 | 41 | 100,000 |
| Mark Joyce | 64 | 84,750 | 64 | 79,750 | 59 | 80,750 | 59 | 80,750 | 57 | 82,250 | 59 | 82,750 | 53 | 87,250 | 55 | 87,250 | 46 | 88,750 | 42 | 98,750 |
| Liam Highfield | 63 | 85,000 | 63 | 86,500 | 60 | 80,500 | 60 | 78,000 | 59 | 79,500 | 57 | 83,500 | 52 | 87,500 | 53 | 90,500 | 49 | 88,000 | 43 | 98,000 |
| Noppon Saengkham | 32 | 161,500 | 44 | 128,000 | 42 | 106,500 | 39 | 114,000 | 41 | 110,500 | 41 | 114,500 | 42 | 110,000 | 43 | 106,500 | 41 | 107,500 | 44 | 97,500 |
| Alexander Ursenbacher | 66 | 47,250 | 66 | 47,250 | 65 | 56,250 | 66 | 59,250 | 63 | 71,250 | 62 | 71,250 | 62 | 72,250 | 61 | 76,250 | 55 | 82,250 | 45 | 97,250 |
| Ben Woollaston | 42 | 136,850 | 42 | 129,750 | 35 | 129,750 | 32 | 137,250 | 34 | 132,250 | 36 | 132,750 | 36 | 131,250 | 35 | 131,750 | 38 | 111,250 | 46 | 96,250 |
| Stuart Carrington | 47 | 128,750 | 49 | 109,750 | 55 | 86,750 | 54 | 87,250 | 51 | 93,750 | 56 | 83,750 | 58 | 80,750 | 58 | 83,750 | 52 | 83,750 | 47 | 93,750 |
| Martin O'Donnell | 34 | 159,250 | 32 | 159,250 | 38 | 122,750 | 38 | 116,750 | 49 | 94,250 | 49 | 95,750 | 46 | 97,750 | 47 | 98,250 | 42 | 107,250 | 48 | 92,250 |
| Mark Davis | 39 | 142,725 | 40 | 137,000 | 44 | 105,000 | 43 | 104,500 | 44 | 99,500 | 45 | 97,000 | 49 | 93,500 | 50 | 96,500 | 45 | 91,000 | 49 | 91,000 |
| Elliot Slessor | 60 | 92,000 | 58 | 88,000 | 58 | 83,500 | 56 | 86,500 | 47 | 98,500 | 48 | 96,000 | 45 | 99,500 | 49 | 96,500 | 48 | 88,500 | 50 | 88,500 |
| Sam Craigie | 58 | 95,500 | 54 | 94,000 | 56 | 86,500 | 55 | 87,000 | 55 | 87,000 | 51 | 91,000 | 51 | 91,500 | 52 | 91,000 | 58 | 78,500 | 51 | 88,500 |
| Mark King | 36 | 148,500 | 34 | 143,500 | 43 | 106,000 | 45 | 103,500 | 43 | 100,000 | 43 | 100,500 | 50 | 92,500 | 46 | 100,000 | 50 | 87,500 | 52 | 87,500 |
| Lyu Haotian | 43 | 134,750 | 41 | 134,750 | 45 | 104,750 | 42 | 104,750 | 40 | 111,250 | 40 | 116,250 | 40 | 118,250 | 41 | 118,250 | 56 | 81,250 | 53 | 86,250 |
| Anthony Hamilton | 40 | 137,750 | 46 | 120,750 | 48 | 99,250 | 47 | 99,250 | 45 | 99,250 | 46 | 96,750 | 48 | 96,750 | 48 | 97,250 | 51 | 85,750 | 54 | 85,750 |
| Jamie Jones | | 0 | 109 | 3,000 | 100 | 8,000 | 104 | 8,000 | 80 | 25,000 | 71 | 45,000 | 71 | 48,000 | 71 | 51,000 | 69 | 55,500 | 55 | 85,500 |
| Andrew Higginson | 59 | 92,750 | 61 | 86,750 | 54 | 87,250 | 57 | 81,250 | 56 | 82,750 | 58 | 82,750 | 54 | 85,750 | 54 | 88,750 | 60 | 75,250 | 56 | 85,250 |
| Sunny Akani | 52 | 109,000 | 51 | 105,000 | 51 | 90,000 | 53 | 90,500 | 58 | 82,000 | 55 | 86,000 | 57 | 83,000 | 56 | 86,000 | 44 | 95,000 | 57 | 85,000 |
| Tian Pengfei | 54 | 105,750 | 52 | 104,250 | 49 | 94,250 | 50 | 91,750 | 54 | 88,250 | 54 | 86,250 | 55 | 84,250 | 57 | 84,250 | 53 | 83,750 | 58 | 83,750 |
| David Grace | 69 | 38,250 | 68 | 41,250 | 67 | 47,250 | 65 | 67,250 | 60 | 79,250 | 60 | 79,250 | 59 | 80,250 | 59 | 83,250 | 54 | 83,750 | 59 | 83,750 |
| Chris Wakelin | 57 | 96,475 | 59 | 87,750 | 62 | 76,250 | 62 | 73,750 | 62 | 75,250 | 61 | 78,250 | 60 | 75,750 | 62 | 75,750 | 63 | 69,250 | 60 | 79,250 |
| Dominic Dale | 70 | 37,750 | 70 | 37,750 | 69 | 41,750 | 69 | 45,750 | 68 | 52,250 | 67 | 55,250 | 65 | 60,250 | 66 | 60,250 | 64 | 67,250 | 61 | 77,250 |
| Joe O'Connor | 62 | 86,750 | 62 | 86,750 | 50 | 92,750 | 49 | 92,750 | 48 | 94,750 | 44 | 97,750 | 43 | 107,750 | 51 | 91,750 | 57 | 81,250 | 62 | 76,250 |
| Jimmy Robertson | 28 | 179,225 | 26 | 177,500 | 47 | 101,000 | 48 | 98,500 | 52 | 93,500 | 52 | 90,000 | 56 | 83,500 | 60 | 83,000 | 61 | 74,000 | 63 | 74,000 |
| Nigel Bond | 68 | 39,750 | 67 | 42,750 | 68 | 46,750 | 68 | 49,750 | 69 | 49,750 | 69 | 52,750 | 67 | 56,250 | 67 | 59,250 | 65 | 61,750 | 64 | 71,750 |
| Ian Burns | 65 | 49,000 | 65 | 52,000 | 66 | 54,000 | 67 | 54,000 | 67 | 54,000 | 68 | 54,000 | 66 | 57,000 | 68 | 57,000 | 66 | 59,500 | 65 | 69,500 |
| Louis Heathcote | 67 | 40,250 | 69 | 40,250 | 70 | 40,250 | 70 | 43,250 | 70 | 43,250 | 70 | 46,250 | 69 | 54,250 | 69 | 54,250 | 67 | 59,250 | 66 | 69,250 |
| Alan McManus | 48 | 115,250 | 47 | 118,250 | 41 | 106,750 | 44 | 104,250 | 50 | 94,250 | 50 | 94,750 | 47 | 97,250 | 44 | 100,250 | 59 | 77,750 | 67 | 67,750 |
| Yuan Sijun | 45 | 129,500 | 45 | 125,500 | 52 | 89,500 | 52 | 91,000 | 53 | 91,000 | 53 | 87,500 | 61 | 74,000 | 63 | 71,500 | 68 | 58,000 | 68 | 58,000 |
| Chang Bingyu | 78 | 17,250 | 80 | 17,250 | 75 | 22,250 | 78 | 22,250 | 72 | 34,250 | 74 | 37,250 | 74 | 37,250 | 77 | 37,250 | 75 | 41,250 | 69 | 56,250 |
| Jak Jones | | 0 | 106 | 3,000 | 91 | 13,000 | 86 | 16,000 | 78 | 28,000 | 78 | 31,000 | 75 | 36,000 | 74 | 40,000 | 73 | 43,500 | 70 | 53,500 |
| Luo Honghao | 61 | 87,000 | 60 | 87,000 | 63 | 75,000 | 63 | 72,500 | 65 | 67,500 | 64 | 67,500 | 64 | 67,500 | 64 | 67,500 | 62 | 73,000 | 71 | 53,000 |
| Pang Junxu | | 0 | 98 | 6,000 | 109 | 6,000 | 112 | 6,000 | 82 | 23,000 | 85 | 23,000 | 84 | 27,000 | 78 | 34,500 | 76 | 40,000 | 72 | 50,000 |
| Gerard Greene | 74 | 26,500 | 74 | 26,500 | 74 | 26,500 | 74 | 26,500 | 73 | 33,000 | 75 | 33,000 | 76 | 35,000 | 75 | 38,000 | 77 | 39,500 | 73 | 49,500 |
| Eden Sharav | 71 | 30,000 | 72 | 30,000 | 72 | 30,000 | 72 | 30,000 | 77 | 30,000 | 73 | 37,500 | 73 | 38,000 | 76 | 38,000 | 78 | 39,500 | 74 | 49,500 |
| Igor Figueiredo | 82 | 14,500 | 84 | 14,500 | 84 | 16,500 | 76 | 24,000 | 76 | 30,500 | 79 | 30,500 | 80 | 30,500 | 83 | 30,500 | 85 | 32,500 | 75 | 47,500 |
| Chen Zifan | 79 | 16,000 | 77 | 19,000 | 79 | 19,000 | 81 | 19,000 | 75 | 31,000 | 77 | 31,000 | 79 | 31,000 | 82 | 31,000 | 81 | 35,000 | 76 | 45,000 |
| Jackson Page | 72 | 28,000 | 71 | 34,000 | 71 | 35,000 | 71 | 38,000 | 71 | 38,000 | 72 | 42,000 | 72 | 42,000 | 73 | 42,000 | 72 | 44,000 | 77 | 44,000 |
| Xu Si | 84 | 13,000 | 85 | 13,000 | 83 | 17,000 | 79 | 20,000 | 74 | 32,000 | 76 | 32,000 | 78 | 32,000 | 81 | 32,000 | 82 | 34,000 | 78 | 44,000 |
| Mei Xiwen | 55 | 97,500 | 57 | 88,000 | 61 | 77,000 | 61 | 74,500 | 64 | 69,500 | 63 | 69,500 | 63 | 69,000 | 65 | 66,500 | 71 | 53,500 | 79 | 43,500 |
| Jamie Clarke | | 0 | 101 | 4,000 | 93 | 12,000 | 94 | 12,000 | 90 | 18,500 | 87 | 21,500 | 91 | 21,500 | 92 | 21,500 | 86 | 28,000 | 80 | 43,000 |
| Marco Fu | 50 | 111,250 | 56 | 88,250 | 64 | 70,250 | 64 | 70,250 | 66 | 60,250 | 65 | 57,750 | 70 | 50,250 | 72 | 47,750 | 74 | 42,750 | 81 | 42,750 |
| Daniel Wells | 56 | 96,750 | 55 | 93,750 | 57 | 83,750 | 58 | 81,250 | 61 | 76,250 | 66 | 56,250 | 68 | 54,250 | 70 | 54,250 | 70 | 55,250 | 82 | 40,250 |
| Mitchell Mann | 73 | 26,500 | 73 | 26,500 | 73 | 27,500 | 73 | 27,500 | 79 | 27,500 | 81 | 27,500 | 83 | 28,000 | 84 | 28,000 | 84 | 33,000 | 83 | 38,000 |
| Jamie O'Neill | 87 | 12,000 | 89 | 12,000 | 82 | 17,000 | 85 | 17,000 | 92 | 17,000 | 83 | 24,500 | 82 | 29,500 | 80 | 32,500 | 79 | 37,000 | 84 | 37,000 |
| Robbie Williams | | 0 | 107 | 3,000 | 87 | 15,000 | 88 | 15,000 | 84 | 21,500 | 80 | 29,000 | 77 | 34,500 | 79 | 34,500 | 80 | 36,500 | 85 | 36,500 |
| Kacper Filipiak | 76 | 19,000 | 76 | 19,000 | 80 | 19,000 | 82 | 19,000 | 88 | 19,000 | 91 | 19,000 | 88 | 23,000 | 88 | 23,000 | 92 | 24,000 | 86 | 34,000 |
| Duane Jones | 88 | 11,750 | 81 | 15,750 | 81 | 17,750 | 84 | 17,750 | 91 | 17,750 | 93 | 17,750 | 90 | 22,250 | 91 | 22,250 | 93 | 23,250 | 87 | 33,250 |
| Jimmy White | 85 | 13,000 | 86 | 13,000 | 90 | 14,000 | 93 | 14,000 | 86 | 20,500 | 88 | 20,500 | 87 | 24,000 | 85 | 27,000 | 83 | 33,000 | 88 | 33,000 |
| Andy Hicks | 94 | 8,000 | 94 | 8,000 | 96 | 11,000 | 90 | 15,000 | 85 | 21,500 | 82 | 24,500 | 85 | 25,000 | 86 | 25,000 | 87 | 27,500 | 89 | 32,500 |
| James Cahill | 83 | 14,500 | 79 | 17,500 | 77 | 19,500 | 77 | 22,500 | 83 | 22,500 | 86 | 22,500 | 89 | 22,500 | 90 | 22,500 | 88 | 27,000 | 90 | 32,000 |
| Rod Lawler | 81 | 15,000 | 83 | 15,000 | 85 | 16,000 | 83 | 19,000 | 89 | 19,000 | 92 | 19,000 | 94 | 19,000 | 96 | 19,000 | 95 | 22,000 | 91 | 32,000 |
| Si Jiahui | 77 | 17,500 | 78 | 17,500 | 78 | 19,500 | 80 | 19,500 | 87 | 19,500 | 89 | 19,500 | 93 | 19,500 | 89 | 22,500 | 89 | 26,500 | 92 | 31,500 |
| Peter Lines | 89 | 10,000 | 87 | 13,000 | 89 | 14,000 | 92 | 14,000 | 98 | 14,000 | 98 | 14,000 | 96 | 17,000 | 99 | 17,000 | 101 | 18,000 | 93 | 28,000 |
| Steven Hallworth | | 0 | 122 | 0 | 112 | 5,000 | 114 | 5,000 | 115 | 5,000 | 112 | 8,000 | 108 | 11,000 | 110 | 11,000 | 109 | 12,500 | 94 | 27,500 |
| David Lilley | 90 | 9,500 | 91 | 9,500 | 88 | 14,500 | 91 | 14,500 | 96 | 14,500 | 97 | 14,500 | 101 | 14,500 | 98 | 17,500 | 94 | 22,000 | 95 | 27,000 |
| Ashley Carty | | 0 | 102 | 4,000 | 113 | 5,000 | 106 | 8,000 | 97 | 14,500 | 94 | 17,500 | 92 | 21,000 | 93 | 21,000 | 96 | 22,000 | 96 | 27,000 |
| Simon Lichtenberg | | 0 | 110 | 3,000 | 107 | 6,000 | 110 | 6,000 | 99 | 12,500 | 102 | 12,500 | 98 | 16,000 | 95 | 19,000 | 97 | 21,500 | 97 | 26,500 |
| Oliver Lines | | 0 | 124 | 0 | 115 | 4,000 | 116 | 4,000 | 103 | 10,500 | 107 | 10,500 | 109 | 10,500 | 102 | 13,500 | 99 | 20,500 | 98 | 25,500 |
| Soheil Vahedi | 80 | 15,500 | 82 | 15,500 | 86 | 15,500 | 87 | 15,500 | 94 | 15,500 | 95 | 15,500 | 95 | 18,500 | 97 | 18,500 | 90 | 25,000 | 99 | 25,000 |
| Barry Pinches | 75 | 20,000 | 75 | 20,000 | 76 | 20,000 | 75 | 24,000 | 81 | 24,000 | 84 | 24,000 | 86 | 24,500 | 87 | 24,500 | 91 | 25,000 | 100 | 25,000 |
| Lei Peifan | 96 | 6,000 | 96 | 6,000 | 99 | 9,000 | 102 | 9,000 | 107 | 9,000 | 105 | 12,000 | 100 | 15,000 | 101 | 15,000 | 100 | 18,500 | 101 | 23,500 |
| Bai Langning | 93 | 8,000 | 93 | 8,000 | 102 | 8,000 | 105 | 8,000 | 109 | 8,000 | 110 | 8,000 | 114 | 8,000 | 115 | 8,000 | 117 | 8,000 | 102 | 23,000 |
| Ken Doherty | | 0 | 111 | 3,000 | 92 | 12,000 | 89 | 15,000 | 95 | 15,000 | 96 | 15,000 | 99 | 16,000 | 94 | 19,000 | 98 | 21,500 | 103 | 21,500 |
| Brandon Sargeant | 91 | 9,000 | 92 | 9,000 | 98 | 10,000 | 99 | 10,000 | 104 | 10,000 | 99 | 13,000 | 97 | 16,000 | 100 | 16,000 | 103 | 16,500 | 104 | 21,500 |
| Zhao Jianbo | | 0 | 118 | 0 | 110 | 5,000 | 103 | 9,000 | 108 | 9,000 | 101 | 13,000 | 102 | 13,000 | 105 | 13,000 | 102 | 16,500 | 105 | 21,500 |
| Fraser Patrick | 92 | 8,500 | 90 | 11,500 | 95 | 11,500 | 97 | 11,500 | 102 | 11,500 | 106 | 11,500 | 107 | 11,500 | 109 | 11,500 | 106 | 14,500 | 106 | 19,500 |
| Gao Yang | | 0 | 112 | 3,000 | 104 | 7,000 | 101 | 10,000 | 106 | 10,000 | 100 | 13,000 | 103 | 13,000 | 106 | 13,000 | 107 | 14,000 | 107 | 19,000 |
| Billy Castle | 86 | 12,000 | 88 | 12,000 | 94 | 12,000 | 95 | 12,000 | 100 | 12,000 | 103 | 12,000 | 106 | 12,000 | 108 | 12,000 | 110 | 12,500 | 108 | 17,500 |
| Fergal O'Brien | | 0 | 114 | 0 | 124 | 0 | 120 | 3,000 | 120 | 3,000 | 120 | 3,000 | 115 | 8,000 | 114 | 8,000 | 111 | 12,000 | 109 | 17,000 |
| Allan Taylor | | 0 | 103 | 4,000 | 101 | 8,000 | 96 | 12,000 | 101 | 12,000 | 104 | 12,000 | 104 | 13,000 | 104 | 13,000 | 104 | 15,500 | 110 | 15,500 |
| Rory McLeod | | 0 | 119 | 0 | 103 | 7,000 | 100 | 10,000 | 105 | 10,000 | 108 | 10,000 | 110 | 10,500 | 111 | 10,500 | 112 | 10,500 | 111 | 15,500 |
| Aaron Hill | | 0 | 97 | 6,000 | 105 | 7,000 | 108 | 7,000 | 111 | 7,000 | 114 | 7,000 | 111 | 10,000 | 103 | 13,000 | 105 | 15,000 | 112 | 15,000 |
| Lukas Kleckers | | 0 | 108 | 3,000 | 117 | 4,000 | 107 | 8,000 | 110 | 8,000 | 111 | 8,000 | 113 | 8,000 | 113 | 8,000 | 115 | 9,000 | 113 | 14,000 |
| Peter Devlin | | 0 | 99 | 6,000 | 108 | 6,000 | 111 | 6,000 | 113 | 6,000 | 109 | 9,000 | 105 | 12,500 | 107 | 12,500 | 108 | 13,500 | 114 | 13,500 |
| Ashley Hugill | | 0 | 115 | 0 | 126 | 0 | 126 | 0 | 126 | 0 | 122 | 3,000 | 117 | 6,000 | 117 | 6,000 | 116 | 8,500 | 115 | 13,500 |
| Jamie Wilson | | 0 | 120 | 0 | 123 | 1,000 | 124 | 1,000 | 124 | 1,000 | 126 | 1,000 | 125 | 1,500 | 121 | 4,500 | 119 | 7,000 | 116 | 12,000 |
| Ben Hancorn | | 0 | 125 | 0 | 118 | 4,000 | 118 | 4,000 | 118 | 4,000 | 119 | 4,000 | 120 | 5,000 | 119 | 5,000 | 113 | 10,000 | 117 | 10,000 |
| Zak Surety | | 0 | 123 | 0 | 121 | 1,000 | 119 | 4,000 | 119 | 4,000 | 113 | 8,000 | 112 | 8,000 | 112 | 8,000 | 114 | 9,500 | 118 | 9,500 |
| Lee Walker | | 0 | 126 | 0 | 125 | 0 | 125 | 0 | 125 | 0 | 121 | 3,000 | 122 | 3,000 | 123 | 3,000 | 122 | 4,500 | 119 | 9,500 |
| Fan Zhengyi | | 0 | 127 | 0 | 120 | 2,000 | 122 | 2,000 | 122 | 2,000 | 124 | 2,000 | 124 | 2,000 | 124 | 2,000 | 123 | 4,500 | 120 | 9,500 |
| Riley Parsons | 98 | 0 | 104 | 3,000 | 111 | 5,000 | 113 | 5,000 | 114 | 5,000 | 116 | 5,000 | 118 | 5,500 | 118 | 5,500 | 118 | 7,000 | 121 | 7,000 |
| Amine Amiri | 95 | 7,000 | 95 | 7,000 | 106 | 7,000 | 109 | 7,000 | 112 | 7,000 | 115 | 7,000 | 116 | 7,000 | 116 | 7,000 | 120 | 7,000 | 122 | 7,000 |
| Alex Borg | 97 | 5,000 | 100 | 5,000 | 114 | 5,000 | 115 | 5,000 | 116 | 5,000 | 117 | 5,000 | 119 | 5,000 | 120 | 5,000 | 121 | 5,000 | 123 | 5,000 |
| Stephen Hendry | | 0 | 128 | 0 | 128 | 0 | 128 | 0 | 128 | 0 | 128 | 0 | 128 | 0 | 128 | 0 | 127 | 0 | 124 | 5,000 |
| Farakh Ajaib | | 0 | 121 | 0 | 116 | 4,000 | 117 | 4,000 | 117 | 4,000 | 118 | 4,000 | 121 | 4,000 | 122 | 4,000 | 124 | 4,500 | 125 | 4,500 |
| Iulian Boiko | | 0 | 116 | 0 | 122 | 1,000 | 123 | 1,000 | 123 | 1,000 | 125 | 1,000 | 126 | 1,000 | 126 | 1,000 | 125 | 3,000 | 126 | 3,000 |
| Sean Maddocks | | 0 | 117 | 0 | 119 | 2,000 | 121 | 2,000 | 121 | 2,000 | 123 | 2,000 | 123 | 2,000 | 125 | 2,000 | 126 | 2,000 | 127 | 2,000 |
| Steve Mifsud | 99 | 0 | 113 | 0 | 127 | 0 | 127 | 0 | 127 | 0 | 127 | 0 | 127 | 0 | 127 | 0 | 128 | 0 | 128 | 0 |

== Ranking points ==
| Preceded by 2019/2020 | 2020/2021 points | Succeeded by 2021/2022 |

Below is a list of points awarded to each player for the events they participated in. Blank fields indicate that the player did not participate at the event.

| Rank | Player | 19/20 season | Tournament | | | | | | | | | | | | | | | Season | Total |
| Rank | Player | 19/20 season | EUM | ENO | CL | NIO | UK | SCO | WGP | GM | SSO | WEO | PC | GO | WPS | TC | WC | 20/21 | Total |
|---|---|---|---|---|---|---|---|---|---|---|---|---|---|---|---|---|---|---|---|
| 1 | Judd Trump | 796500 | 17500 | 70000 | 23000 | 70000 | 80000 | 10000 | 100000 | 80000 | | 4000 | 0 | 50000 | 19000 | 0 | 50000 | 573500 | 1370000 |
| 2 | Mark Selby | 425500 | 80000 | 20000 | 8000 | 3000 | 24500 | 70000 | 20000 | 0 | 20000 | 10000 | 15000 | 3000 | 7000 | 40000 | 500000 | 820500 | 1246000 |
| 3 | Ronnie O'Sullivan | 597500 | 3000 | 4000 | | 30000 | 6500 | 30000 | 20000 | | | 30000 | 50000 | | 0 | 60000 | 30000 | 263500 | 861000 |
| 4 | Neil Robertson | 324500 | 11000 | 30000 | 2000 | 3000 | 200000 | 0 | 0 | 0 | | 0 | 15000 | 0 | | 150000 | 50000 | 461000 | 785500 |
| 5 | Shaun Murphy | 383000 | 17500 | 3000 | 6000 | 0 | 6500 | 4000 | 0 | 4000 | 500 | 10000 | | 3000 | 6000 | | 200000 | 260500 | 643500 |
| 6 | Kyren Wilson | 350000 | 11000 | 10000 | 33000 | 4000 | 24500 | 10000 | 12500 | 3000 | | 4000 | 30000 | 3000 | 16000 | 0 | 100000 | 261000 | 611000 |
| 7 | John Higgins | 188500 | 0 | 20000 | 11000 | 7500 | 17000 | 3000 | 7500 | 4000 | 500 | 4000 | 125000 | | | 0 | 30000 | 229500 | 418000 |
| 8 | Ding Junhui | 291250 | 11000 | 7500 | | 10000 | 6500 | 10000 | 7500 | 10000 | | 3000 | 0 | 0 | | | 0 | 65500 | 356750 |
| 9 | Stephen Maguire | 302000 | 4000 | 0 | 1000 | 4000 | 12000 | 0 | | 4000 | | 20000 | | | | | 0 | 45000 | 347000 |
| 10 | Yan Bingtao | 236500 | 11000 | 3000 | 2000 | 10000 | 6500 | 0 | 7500 | 0 | | 7500 | | 0 | | | 30000 | 77500 | 314000 |
| 11 | Mark Williams | 169250 | 3000 | 0 | | 3000 | 12000 | 7500 | | 0 | 8000 | 20000 | 0 | 2000 | 31500 | | 50000 | 137000 | 306250 |
| 12 | Mark Allen | 225500 | 6000 | 3000 | 2000 | 4000 | 6500 | 7500 | 0 | 3000 | 2000 | 7500 | | 5000 | | | 30000 | 76500 | 302000 |
| 13 | Barry Hawkins | 101250 | 4000 | 7500 | 6000 | 3000 | 17000 | 7500 | 7500 | 20000 | 500 | 7500 | 30000 | 2000 | 9000 | 40000 | 30000 | 191500 | 292750 |
| 14 | Jack Lisowski | 86750 | 3000 | 3000 | 1000 | 0 | 24500 | 3000 | 40000 | 35000 | 0 | 7500 | 15000 | 20000 | 12500 | 0 | 30000 | 194500 | 281250 |
| 15 | Stuart Bingham | 95500 | 6000 | 3000 | 4000 | 3000 | 12000 | 7500 | 7500 | 10000 | 0 | 0 | 15000 | 2000 | 15500 | | 100000 | 185500 | 281000 |
| 16 | Anthony McGill | 156500 | 6000 | 7500 | 0 | 3000 | 17000 | 0 | 7500 | 3000 | | 4000 | | 2000 | 500 | | 50000 | 100500 | 257000 |
| 17 | Zhou Yuelong | 102250 | 4000 | 10000 | 9000 | 3000 | 40000 | 4000 | 0 | 4000 | 2000 | 7500 | 0 | 2000 | 5000 | | 15000 | 105500 | 207750 |
| 18 | Graeme Dott | 151250 | 3000 | 0 | 6000 | 0 | 17000 | 0 | | 4000 | | 3000 | | | 0 | | 15000 | 48000 | 199250 |
| 19 | Thepchaiya Un-Nooh | 156000 | 0 | 3000 | 6000 | 7500 | 6500 | 3000 | | 0 | 2000 | 0 | | 4000 | 0 | | 0 | 32000 | 188000 |
| 20 | Joe Perry | 130000 | 0 | 3000 | 8000 | 3000 | 24500 | 0 | 0 | 5000 | 1000 | 4000 | | 3000 | 6000 | | 0 | 57500 | 187500 |
| 21 | Kurt Maflin | 122000 | 0 | 4000 | 1000 | 10000 | 12000 | 0 | 0 | 0 | | 0 | | | | | 20000 | 47000 | 169000 |
| 22 | Tom Ford | 107250 | 6000 | 4000 | 5000 | 3000 | 0 | 3000 | | 20000 | 0 | 10000 | | 3000 | 2000 | | 0 | 56000 | 163250 |
| 23 | David Gilbert | 104000 | 4000 | 0 | 4000 | 0 | 6500 | 0 | | 0 | 4000 | 4000 | | 4000 | 2000 | | 30000 | 58500 | 162500 |
| 24 | Ali Carter | 72000 | 3000 | 0 | 1000 | 20000 | 0 | 3000 | 0 | 0 | | 10000 | | 3000 | 24000 | | 20000 | 84000 | 156000 |
| 25 | Martin Gould | 61750 | 35000 | 0 | 6000 | 7500 | 0 | 0 | 12500 | 0 | 1000 | 4000 | 0 | 3000 | 500 | | 20000 | 89500 | 151250 |
| 26 | Zhao Xintong | 76750 | 0 | 3000 | 11000 | 7500 | 6500 | 3000 | 12500 | 3000 | | 3000 | | 3000 | 5500 | | 15000 | 73000 | 149750 |
| 27 | Liang Wenbo | 89500 | 0 | 4000 | 2000 | 4000 | 12000 | 4000 | 0 | 4000 | 1000 | 0 | | 2000 | | | 20000 | 53000 | 142500 |
| 28 | Ryan Day | 45250 | 3000 | 3000 | 5000 | 4000 | 0 | 0 | | 4000 | 50000 | 4000 | 0 | 0 | 8000 | | 15000 | 96000 | 141250 |
| 29 | Xiao Guodong | 69500 | 3000 | 0 | 5000 | 3000 | 17000 | 0 | 0 | 3000 | 1000 | 4000 | | 5000 | 13500 | | 15000 | 69500 | 139000 |
| 30 | Matthew Selt | 80250 | 3000 | 3000 | 5000 | 4000 | 6500 | 3000 | | 0 | 0 | 4000 | | 6000 | 2000 | | 20000 | 56500 | 136750 |
| 31 | Michael Holt | 105000 | 4000 | 4000 | 0 | 7500 | 6500 | 4000 | 0 | 3000 | 500 | 0 | | | 1500 | | 0 | 31000 | 136000 |
| 32 | Ricky Walden | 62750 | 0 | 3000 | 1000 | 0 | 17000 | 10000 | 0 | 3000 | 0 | 4000 | | 4000 | 4500 | | 20000 | 66500 | 129250 |
| 33 | Gary Wilson | 91000 | 0 | 7500 | 1000 | 0 | 0 | 0 | | 0 | 0 | 3000 | | 0 | 1500 | | 20000 | 33000 | 124000 |
| 34 | Scott Donaldson | 80250 | 3000 | 0 | 6000 | 10000 | 0 | 0 | | 0 | 0 | 4000 | | 2000 | 1500 | | 15000 | 41500 | 121750 |
| 35 | Lu Ning | 32750 | 0 | 3000 | 2000 | 3000 | 40000 | 4000 | 7500 | 0 | | 0 | 0 | 5000 | 4000 | | 15000 | 83500 | 116250 |
| 36 | Matthew Stevens | 82750 | 4000 | 7500 | 2000 | 4000 | 0 | 3000 | | 0 | 1000 | 3000 | | 0 | 2500 | | 0 | 27000 | 109750 |
| 37 | Robert Milkins | 45000 | 3000 | 0 | 4000 | 3000 | 12000 | 4000 | 7500 | 0 | 4000 | 3000 | | 3000 | 6000 | | 15000 | 64500 | 109500 |
| 38 | Li Hang | 55500 | 0 | 0 | 4000 | 0 | 12000 | 20000 | 0 | 0 | | 0 | | 0 | 2000 | | 15000 | 53000 | 108500 |
| 39 | Luca Brecel | 52000 | 4000 | 3000 | 2000 | 4000 | 6500 | 3000 | | 5000 | 0 | 0 | | 2000 | 7000 | | 15000 | 51500 | 103500 |
| 40 | Jordan Brown | 0 | 3000 | 3000 | 4000 | 0 | 6500 | 3000 | | 10000 | 500 | 70000 | 0 | 0 | 1000 | | 0 | 101000 | 101000 |
| 41 | Hossein Vafaei | 48000 | 3000 | 7500 | 2000 | 0 | 12000 | 3000 | 12500 | 0 | 500 | 7500 | | 3000 | 1000 | | 0 | 52000 | 100000 |
| 42 | Mark Joyce | 57250 | 0 | 3000 | 2000 | 0 | 6500 | 4000 | | 4000 | 500 | 0 | | 0 | 1500 | | 20000 | 41500 | 98750 |
| 43 | Liam Highfield | 49500 | 4000 | 3000 | 2000 | 0 | 6500 | 4000 | | 3000 | 1000 | 3000 | | 0 | 2000 | | 20000 | 48500 | 98000 |
| 44 | Noppon Saengkham | 71000 | 0 | 0 | 0 | 7500 | 6500 | 4000 | | 4000 | 2000 | 0 | | 0 | 2500 | | 0 | 26500 | 97500 |
| 45 | Alexander Ursenbacher | 47250 | 0 | 4000 | 5000 | 3000 | 12000 | 0 | | 0 | 1000 | 4000 | | 4000 | 2000 | | 15000 | 50000 | 97250 |
| 46 | Ben Woollaston | 58250 | 3000 | 7500 | 0 | 7500 | 0 | 3000 | | 3000 | 0 | 3000 | | 2000 | 9000 | | 0 | 38000 | 96250 |
| 47 | Stuart Carrington | 53250 | 0 | 0 | 0 | 3000 | 6500 | 0 | | 5000 | 0 | 3000 | | 6000 | 7000 | | 10000 | 40500 | 93750 |
| 48 | Martin O'Donnell | 59250 | 4000 | 3000 | 2000 | 0 | 0 | 4000 | | 3000 | 4000 | 4000 | | 0 | 9000 | | 0 | 33000 | 92250 |
| 49 | Mark Davis | 41000 | 4000 | 4000 | 6000 | 3000 | 0 | 0 | | 4000 | 0 | 3000 | | 0 | 6000 | | 20000 | 50000 | 91000 |
| 50 | Elliot Slessor | 61000 | 0 | 0 | 2000 | 3000 | 12000 | 0 | | 3000 | 1000 | 3000 | | 2000 | 1500 | | 0 | 27500 | 88500 |
| 51 | Sam Craigie | 32500 | 0 | 0 | 2000 | 3000 | 0 | 4000 | | 3000 | 500 | 3000 | | 0 | 20500 | | 20000 | 56000 | 88500 |
| 52 | Mark King | 55500 | 0 | 0 | 5000 | 0 | 6500 | 3000 | | 0 | 0 | 7500 | | 0 | 0 | | 10000 | 32000 | 87500 |
| 53 | Lyu Haotian | 38250 | 4000 | 0 | 2000 | 0 | 6500 | 7500 | | 0 | 2000 | 0 | | 0 | 6000 | | 20000 | 48000 | 86250 |
| 54 | Anthony Hamilton | 67750 | 0 | 0 | | 0 | 0 | 0 | | 0 | 0 | 3000 | | 4000 | 1000 | | 10000 | 18000 | 85750 |
| 55 | Jamie Jones | 0 | 3000 | 3000 | 2000 | 0 | 17000 | 20000 | 0 | 3000 | 0 | 3000 | | 2000 | 2500 | | 30000 | 85500 | 85500 |
| 56 | Andrew Higginson | 46750 | 3000 | 7500 | 1000 | 0 | 6500 | 0 | | 3000 | 0 | 3000 | | 2000 | 2500 | | 10000 | 38500 | 85250 |
| 57 | Sunny Akani | 53500 | 0 | 3000 | 2000 | 3000 | 6500 | 4000 | | 0 | 1000 | 3000 | | 2000 | 7000 | | 0 | 31500 | 85000 |
| 58 | Tian Pengfei | 44750 | 0 | 0 | 5000 | 0 | 6500 | 4000 | | 0 | 0 | 0 | | 2000 | 1500 | | 20000 | 39000 | 83750 |
| 59 | David Grace | 38250 | 3000 | 4000 | 2000 | 20000 | 12000 | 0 | 0 | 0 | 1000 | 3000 | | 0 | 500 | | 0 | 45500 | 83750 |
| 60 | Chris Wakelin | 37250 | 3000 | 0 | 2000 | 0 | 6500 | 3000 | | 0 | 500 | 0 | | 5000 | 2000 | | 20000 | 42000 | 79250 |
| 61 | Dominic Dale | 37750 | 0 | 0 | 4000 | 4000 | 6500 | 3000 | | 5000 | 0 | 0 | | 0 | 7000 | | 10000 | 39500 | 77250 |
| 62 | Joe O'Connor | 26750 | 4000 | 4000 | 2000 | 0 | 12000 | 3000 | | 10000 | 0 | 4000 | | 0 | 500 | | 10000 | 49500 | 76250 |
| 63 | Jimmy Robertson | 48500 | 0 | 4000 | 1000 | 0 | 0 | 0 | | 3000 | 0 | 3000 | | 2000 | 2500 | | 10000 | 25500 | 74000 |
| 64 | Nigel Bond | 39750 | 3000 | 3000 | 1000 | 3000 | 0 | 3000 | | 3000 | 500 | 3000 | | 0 | 2500 | | 10000 | 32000 | 71750 |
| 65 | Ian Burns | 49000 | 3000 | 0 | 2000 | 0 | 0 | 0 | | 3000 | 0 | 0 | | 0 | 2500 | | 10000 | 20500 | 69500 |
| 66 | Louis Heathcote | 40250 | 0 | 0 | 0 | 3000 | 0 | 3000 | | 4000 | 4000 | 0 | | 0 | 5000 | | 10000 | 29000 | 69250 |
| 67 | Alan McManus | 50750 | 3000 | 0 | 0 | 0 | 0 | 3000 | | 3000 | 500 | 3000 | | 2000 | 2500 | | 0 | 17000 | 67750 |
| 68 | Yuan Sijun | 44500 | 0 | 3000 | 1000 | 4000 | 0 | 0 | | 4000 | | 0 | | 0 | 1500 | | 0 | 13500 | 58000 |
| 69 | Chang Bingyu | 17250 | 0 | 3000 | 2000 | 0 | 12000 | 3000 | | 0 | | 0 | | 2000 | 2000 | | 15000 | 39000 | 56250 |
| 70 | Jak Jones | 0 | 3000 | 10000 | 0 | 3000 | 12000 | 3000 | 0 | 5000 | 0 | 4000 | | 2000 | 1500 | | 10000 | 53500 | 53500 |
| 71 | Luo Honghao | 35500 | 0 | 3000 | 6000 | 0 | 0 | 0 | | 3000 | 0 | 0 | | 0 | 5500 | | 0 | 17500 | 53000 |
| 72 | Pang Junxu | 0 | 6000 | 0 | 0 | 0 | 17000 | 0 | | 4000 | | 7500 | | 3000 | 2500 | | 10000 | 50000 | 50000 |
| 73 | Gerard Greene | 26500 | 0 | 0 | 0 | 0 | 6500 | 0 | | 0 | 2000 | 3000 | | 0 | 1500 | | 10000 | 23000 | 49500 |
| 74 | Eden Sharav | 30000 | 0 | 0 | 0 | 0 | 0 | 7500 | | 0 | 500 | 0 | | 0 | 1500 | | 10000 | 19500 | 49500 |
| 75 | Igor Figueiredo | 14500 | 0 | 0 | 2000 | 7500 | 6500 | 0 | | 0 | | 0 | | 0 | 2000 | | 15000 | 33000 | 47500 |
| 76 | Chen Zifan | 16000 | 3000 | 0 | 0 | 0 | 12000 | 0 | | 0 | | 0 | | 3000 | 1000 | | 10000 | 29000 | 45000 |
| 77 | Jackson Page | 28000 | 6000 | 0 | 1000 | 3000 | 0 | 4000 | | 0 | 0 | 0 | | 0 | 2000 | | 0 | 16000 | 44000 |
| 78 | Xu Si | 13000 | 0 | 4000 | 0 | 3000 | 12000 | 0 | | 0 | | 0 | | 0 | 2000 | | 10000 | 31000 | 44000 |
| 79 | Mei Xiwen | 43500 | | | | | | | | | | | | | | | | 0 | 43500 |
| 80 | Jamie Clarke | 0 | 4000 | 4000 | 4000 | 0 | 6500 | 3000 | | 0 | 0 | 0 | | 4000 | 2500 | | 15000 | 43000 | 43000 |
| 81 | Marco Fu | 42750 | | | | | | | | | | | | | | | | 0 | 42750 |
| 82 | Daniel Wells | 36250 | 0 | 0 | 0 | 0 | 0 | 0 | | 0 | 0 | 0 | | 2000 | 2000 | | 0 | 4000 | 40250 |
| 83 | Mitchell Mann | 26500 | 0 | 0 | 1000 | 0 | 0 | 0 | | 0 | 500 | 0 | | 3000 | 2000 | | 5000 | 11500 | 38000 |
| 84 | Jamie O'Neill | 12000 | 0 | 0 | 5000 | 0 | 0 | 7500 | | 5000 | 0 | 3000 | | 2000 | 2500 | | 0 | 25000 | 37000 |
| 85 | Robbie Williams | 0 | 3000 | 10000 | 2000 | 0 | 6500 | 7500 | 0 | 5000 | 500 | 0 | | 0 | 2000 | | 0 | 36500 | 36500 |
| 86 | Kacper Filipiak | 19000 | 0 | 0 | 0 | 0 | 0 | 0 | | 4000 | | 0 | | 0 | 1000 | | 10000 | 15000 | 34000 |
| 87 | Duane Jones | 11750 | 4000 | 0 | 2000 | 0 | 0 | 0 | | 4000 | 500 | 0 | | 0 | 1000 | | 10000 | 21500 | 33250 |
| 88 | Jimmy White | 13000 | 0 | 0 | 1000 | 0 | 6500 | 0 | | 3000 | 500 | 3000 | | 4000 | 2000 | | 0 | 20000 | 33000 |
| 89 | Andy Hicks | 8000 | 0 | 3000 | | 4000 | 6500 | 3000 | | 0 | 500 | 0 | | 0 | 2500 | | 5000 | 24500 | 32500 |
| 90 | James Cahill | 14500 | 3000 | 0 | 2000 | 3000 | 0 | 0 | | 0 | 0 | 0 | | 0 | 4500 | | 5000 | 17500 | 32000 |
| 91 | Rod Lawler | 15000 | 0 | 0 | 1000 | 3000 | 0 | 0 | | 0 | 0 | 0 | | 2000 | 1000 | | 10000 | 17000 | 32000 |
| 92 | Si Jiahui | 17500 | 0 | 0 | 2000 | 0 | 0 | 0 | | 0 | | 3000 | | 2000 | 2000 | | 5000 | 14000 | 31500 |
| 93 | Peter Lines | 10000 | 3000 | 0 | 1000 | 0 | 0 | 0 | | 3000 | 0 | 0 | | 0 | 1000 | | 10000 | 18000 | 28000 |
| 94 | Steven Hallworth | 0 | 0 | 4000 | 1000 | 0 | 0 | 3000 | | 3000 | 0 | 0 | | 0 | 1500 | | 15000 | 27500 | 27500 |
| 95 | David Lilley | 9500 | 0 | 4000 | 1000 | 0 | 0 | 0 | | 0 | 0 | 3000 | | 2000 | 2500 | | 5000 | 17500 | 27000 |
| 96 | Ashley Carty | 0 | 4000 | 0 | 1000 | 3000 | 6500 | 3000 | | 3000 | 500 | 0 | | 0 | 1000 | | 5000 | 27000 | 27000 |
| 97 | Simon Lichtenberg | 0 | 3000 | 3000 | 0 | 0 | 6500 | 0 | | 3000 | 500 | 3000 | | 0 | 2500 | | 5000 | 26500 | 26500 |
| 98 | Oliver Lines | 0 | 0 | 3000 | 1000 | 0 | 6500 | 0 | | 0 | 0 | 3000 | | 2000 | 5000 | | 5000 | 25500 | 25500 |
| 99 | Soheil Vahedi | 15500 | 0 | 0 | 0 | 0 | 0 | 0 | | 3000 | 0 | 0 | | 4000 | 2500 | | 0 | 9500 | 25000 |
| 100 | Barry Pinches | 20000 | 0 | 0 | 0 | 4000 | 0 | 0 | | 0 | 500 | 0 | | 0 | 500 | | 0 | 5000 | 25000 |
| 101 | Lei Peifan | 6000 | 0 | 3000 | 0 | 0 | 0 | 3000 | | 3000 | 0 | 0 | | 3000 | 500 | | 5000 | 17500 | 23500 |
| 102 | Bai Langning | 8000 | | | | | | | | | | | | | | | 15000 | 15000 | 23000 |
| 103 | Ken Doherty | 0 | 3000 | 0 | 9000 | 3000 | 0 | 0 | | 0 | 1000 | 3000 | | 2000 | 500 | | 0 | 21500 | 21500 |
| 104 | Brandon Sargeant | 9000 | 0 | 0 | 1000 | 0 | 0 | 3000 | | 3000 | 0 | 0 | | 0 | 500 | | 5000 | 12500 | 21500 |
| 105 | Zhao Jianbo | 0 | 0 | 3000 | 2000 | 4000 | 0 | 4000 | | 0 | | 0 | | 3000 | 500 | | 5000 | 21500 | 21500 |
| 106 | Fraser Patrick | 8500 | 3000 | 0 | 0 | 0 | 0 | 0 | | 0 | 0 | 0 | | 3000 | 0 | | 5000 | 11000 | 19500 |
| 107 | Gao Yang | 0 | 3000 | 3000 | 1000 | 3000 | 0 | 3000 | | 0 | | 0 | | 0 | 1000 | | 5000 | 19000 | 19000 |
| 108 | Billy Castle | 12000 | 0 | 0 | 0 | 0 | 0 | 0 | | 0 | 0 | 0 | | 0 | 500 | | 5000 | 5500 | 17500 |
| 109 | Fergal O'Brien | 0 | 0 | 0 | 0 | 3000 | 0 | 0 | | 5000 | | 0 | | 0 | 4000 | | 5000 | 17000 | 17000 |
| 110 | Allan Taylor | 0 | 4000 | 4000 | 0 | 4000 | 0 | 0 | | 0 | 1000 | 0 | | 2000 | 500 | | 0 | 15500 | 15500 |
| 111 | Rory McLeod | 0 | 0 | 3000 | 4000 | 3000 | 0 | 0 | | 0 | 500 | 0 | | 0 | 0 | | 5000 | 15500 | 15500 |
| 112 | Aaron Hill | 0 | 6000 | 0 | 1000 | 0 | 0 | 0 | | 3000 | 0 | 3000 | | 2000 | | | 0 | 15000 | 15000 |
| 113 | Lukas Kleckers | 0 | 3000 | 0 | 1000 | 4000 | 0 | 0 | | 0 | 0 | 0 | | 0 | 1000 | | 5000 | 14000 | 14000 |
| 114 | Peter Devlin | 0 | 6000 | 0 | 0 | 0 | 0 | 3000 | | 3000 | 500 | 0 | | 0 | 1000 | | 0 | 13500 | 13500 |
| 115 | Ashley Hugill | 0 | 0 | 0 | 0 | 0 | 0 | 3000 | | 3000 | | 0 | | 0 | 2500 | | 5000 | 13500 | 13500 |
| 116 | Jamie Wilson | 0 | 0 | 0 | 1000 | 0 | 0 | 0 | | 0 | 500 | 3000 | | 2000 | 500 | | 5000 | 12000 | 12000 |
| 117 | Ben Hancorn | 0 | 0 | 4000 | 0 | 0 | 0 | 0 | | 0 | 1000 | 0 | | 0 | 5000 | | 0 | 10000 | 10000 |
| 118 | Zak Surety | 0 | 0 | 0 | 1000 | 3000 | 0 | 4000 | | 0 | 0 | 0 | | 0 | 1500 | | 0 | 9500 | 9500 |
| 119 | Lee Walker | 0 | 0 | 0 | 0 | 0 | 0 | 3000 | | 0 | 0 | 0 | | 0 | 1500 | | 5000 | 9500 | 9500 |
| 120 | Fan Zhengyi | 0 | 0 | 0 | 2000 | 0 | 0 | 0 | | 0 | 0 | 0 | | 2000 | 500 | | 5000 | 9500 | 9500 |
| 121 | Riley Parsons | 0 | 3000 | 0 | 2000 | 0 | 0 | 0 | | 0 | 500 | 0 | | 0 | 1500 | | 0 | 7000 | 7000 |
| 122 | Amine Amiri | 7000 | 0 | 0 | 0 | 0 | 0 | 0 | | 0 | | | | | | | 0 | 0 | 7000 |
| 123 | Alex Borg | 5000 | 0 | 0 | 0 | 0 | 0 | 0 | | 0 | | 0 | | | | | 0 | 0 | 5000 |
| 124 | Stephen Hendry | 0 | | | | | | | | | | | | 0 | | | 5000 | 5000 | 5000 |
| 125 | Farakh Ajaib | 0 | 0 | 3000 | 1000 | 0 | 0 | 0 | | 0 | 0 | 0 | | 0 | 500 | | 0 | 4500 | 4500 |
| 126 | Iulian Boiko | 0 | 0 | 0 | 1000 | 0 | 0 | 0 | | 0 | 0 | 0 | | 2000 | 0 | | 0 | 3000 | 3000 |
| 127 | Sean Maddocks | 0 | 0 | 0 | 2000 | 0 | 0 | 0 | | 0 | 0 | 0 | | 0 | 0 | | 0 | 2000 | 2000 |
| 128 | Steve Mifsud | 0 | | | | | | | | | | | | | | | | 0 | 0 |
