= 2020–21 snooker season =

Series of snooker tournaments

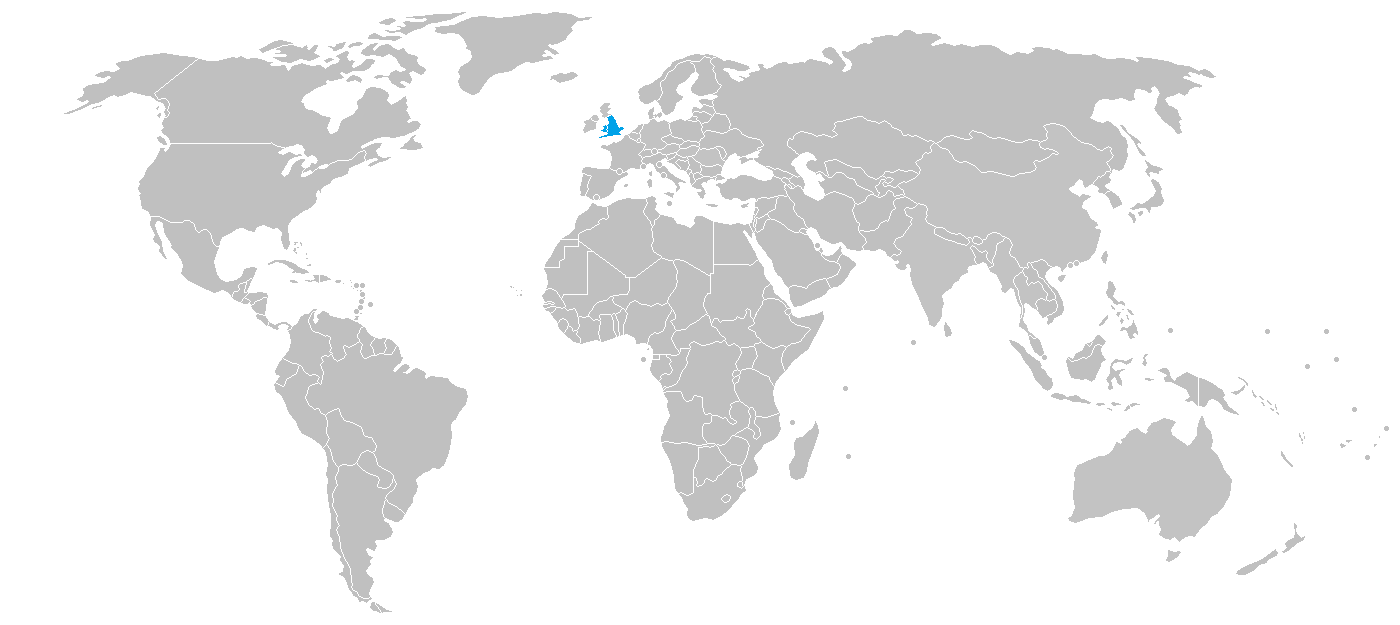
- Due to the COVID-19 pandemic, all snooker events in the 2020–21 calendar were held in the United Kingdom

Details
- Duration: 13 September 2020 – 9 May 2021
- Tournaments: 19 (15 ranking events)

Triple Crown winners
- UK Championship: Neil Robertson (AUS)
- Masters: Yan Bingtao (CHN)
- World Championship: Mark Selby (ENG)

The 2020–21 snooker season was a professional snooker season with tournaments played from 13 September 2020 to 9 May 2021. As a result of the COVID-19 pandemic, the season was played almost entirely without a live audience with only the 2021 World Snooker Championship being played in front of a crowd. All snooker tournaments in the season were played in the United Kingdom, due to travel and quarantine restrictions preventing the tour and players from utilising usual venues.

Judd Trump won five ranking events during the season, whilst Mark Selby won the 2021 World Snooker Championship, to win his fourth world championship. Trump retained the world number one spot throughout the season, also reaching the final of the 2020 UK Championship, losing to Neil Robertson. Teenager Yan Bingtao won the other Triple Crown event, the 2021 Masters. This was the first season in a decade that Ronnie O'Sullivan failed to win a triple crown event; O'Sullivan was defeated in all 5 ranking finals he reached this season, marking the first season since 2016–17 that he had not captured a ranking title.

== Overview ==
With the exception of two events played at the Celtic Manor Resort in Newport, Wales (the Welsh Open and the Tour Championship) and the World Championship at the Crucible Theatre in Sheffield; all snooker tournaments were played at the Marshall Arena in Milton Keynes. The venue was used to cooperate with restrictions caused by the COVID-19 lockdown in the United Kingdom.

Towards the end of October, World Snooker Tour had announced that the UK Championship would have the first round played at the same arena, but all televised stages would then be played at the York Barbican: on 4 November, days after the UK Government announced a lockdown for all of England, this was then revised to include the entire tournament.

Despite space being allocated for back-to-back events in China during March, WST later confirmed on 3 December 2020 that all China-based tournaments were cancelled, due to continuing travel restrictions, making it the first season in more than a decade where no tournaments would be staged in Asia. In its place, a new WST Pro Series was added, taking place between January and March 2021.

On 4 January 2021, the week prior to the event, WST announced that the Masters would be moved to the Marshall Arena, as a result of logistical challenges associated with Alexandra Palace having no on-site facilities and lengthy travel requirements from a hotel, preventing a secure 'bubble' from being formed to host the event.

On 26 January 2021, World Snooker Tour announced that the Welsh Open would become the first event that season to be played outside the Marshall Arena, at the Celtic Manor Resort in Newport. This was made possible due to a Covid-bubble being able to be created with similar on-site accommodation facilities, meaning players were able to stay within the bubble while playing in the event. Later in the season, World Snooker confirmed that the 2021 Tour Championship event would be played at Celtic Manor as the final event of the season prior to the World Championship at the Crucible Theatre.

On 13 March 2021, World Snooker announced that the World Snooker Championship would welcome a limited number of fans, as part of an Events Research Programme run by the government. The programme intends to test a variety of settings to generate evidence on how fans may be safely welcomed into sporting events in future, with the Crucible Theatre providing evidence of a "theatre setting".

On 20 April 2021, towards the start of the World Championship, it was announced that Barry Hearn would step down as Chairman of the World Snooker Tour and as President of Matchroom Sport. Steve Dawson will replace Hearn as the Chairman of the World Snooker Tour after the conclusion of the season, although Hearn will remain in an advisory position on tour.

== Players ==
The World Snooker Tour in the 2020–21 season consists of a field of 128 professional players. The top 64 players from the prize money rankings after the 2020 World Championship, and the 35 players earning a two-year card the previous year automatically qualify for the season. Next, four places are allocated to the top four on the One Year Ranking List who have not already qualified for the Main Tour. Another two players came from the Challenge Tour, two players came from the CBSA China Tour, and a further 12 places were available through the Q School, four from each of the three events. Two-year tour cards were also awarded to any player outside the top 64, who qualified for the main stage of the 2020 World Snooker Championship at the Crucible. The rest of the places on to the tour came from amateur events.

=== New professional players ===
All players listed below received a tour card for two seasons.

International champions

EBSA European Championship winner: (Wales) Andrew Pagett (deferred)

1. EBSA European Under-21 Championship winner: (Republic of Ireland) Aaron Hill
2. WSF Open winner: (England) Ashley Hugill
3. WSF Open runner-up: (Ukraine) Iulian Boiko
4. WSF Junior Open winner: (China) Gao Yang
5. WSF Junior Open runner-up: (England) Sean Maddocks

One Year Ranking List

6. (Northern Ireland) Jordan Brown
7. (Wales) Jak Jones
8. (England) Robbie Williams
9. (Republic of Ireland) Fergal O'Brien

CBSA China Tour

10. (China) Pang Junxu
11. (China) Zhao Jianbo

Challenge Tour

Main article: 2019–20 Challenge Tour
12. (Germany) Lukas Kleckers
13. (England) Allan Taylor

World Championship Wildcards

14. (England) Ashley Carty
15. (Wales) Jamie Clarke

Q School

Main article: 2020 Q School

Event 1

16. (Wales) Lee Walker
17. (England) Peter Devlin
18. (Germany) Simon Lichtenberg
19. (China) Fan Zhengyi

Event 2

20. (Wales) Jamie Jones
21. (England) Zak Surety
22. (England) Oliver Lines
23. (England) Ben Hancorn

Event 3

24. (Jamaica) Rory McLeod
25. (England) Jamie Wilson
26. (England) Farakh Ajaib
27. (England) Steven Hallworth

Invitational Tour Card

28. (Republic of Ireland) Ken Doherty
29. (Scotland) Stephen Hendry

== Calendar ==
The following tables outline the dates and results for all the events of the World Snooker Tour and the World Seniors Tour.

=== World Snooker Tour ===
Start	Finish	Tournament	Venue	Winner	Score	Runner-up	Ref.
21 Sep	27 Sep	European Masters	Marshall Arena in Milton Keynes, England	Mark Selby (ENG)	9‍–‍8	Martin Gould (ENG)	
12 Oct	18 Oct	English Open	Marshall Arena in Milton Keynes, England	Judd Trump (ENG)	9‍–‍8	Neil Robertson (AUS)	
13 Sep	30 Oct	Championship League	Ballroom, Stadium MK in Milton Keynes, England	Kyren Wilson (ENG)	3‍–‍1	Judd Trump (ENG)	
2 Nov	8 Nov	Champion of Champions†	Marshall Arena in Milton Keynes, England	Mark Allen (NIR)	10‍–‍6	Neil Robertson (AUS)	
16 Nov	22 Nov	Northern Ireland Open	Marshall Arena in Milton Keynes, England	Judd Trump (ENG)	9‍–‍7	Ronnie O'Sullivan (ENG)	
23 Nov	6 Dec	UK Championship	Marshall Arena in Milton Keynes, England	Neil Robertson (AUS)	10‍–‍9	Judd Trump (ENG)	
7 Dec	13 Dec	Scottish Open	Marshall Arena in Milton Keynes, England	Mark Selby (ENG)	9‍–‍3	Ronnie O'Sullivan (ENG)	
14 Dec	20 Dec	World Grand Prix	Marshall Arena in Milton Keynes, England	Judd Trump (ENG)	10‍–‍7	Jack Lisowski (ENG)	
10 Jan	17 Jan	Masters†	Marshall Arena in Milton Keynes, England	Yan Bingtao (CHN)	10‍–‍8	John Higgins (SCO)	
27 Jan	31 Jan	German Masters	Marshall Arena in Milton Keynes, England	Judd Trump (ENG)	9‍–‍2	Jack Lisowski (ENG)	
4 Feb	7 Feb	Shoot Out	Marshall Arena in Milton Keynes, England	Ryan Day (WAL)	1‍–‍0	Mark Selby (ENG)	
15 Feb	21 Feb	Welsh Open	Celtic Manor Resort in Newport, Wales	Jordan Brown (NIR)	9‍–‍8	Ronnie O'Sullivan (ENG)	
22 Feb	28 Feb	Players Championship	Marshall Arena in Milton Keynes, England	John Higgins (SCO)	10‍–‍3	Ronnie O'Sullivan (ENG)	
1 Mar	7 Mar	Gibraltar Open	Marshall Arena in Milton Keynes, England	Judd Trump (ENG)	4‍–‍0	Jack Lisowski (ENG)	
18 Jan	21 Mar	WST Pro Series	Marshall Arena in Milton Keynes, England	Mark Williams (WAL)	R‍–‍R	Ali Carter (ENG)	
22 Mar	28 Mar	Tour Championship	Celtic Manor Resort in Newport, Wales	Neil Robertson (AUS)	10‍–‍4	Ronnie O'Sullivan (ENG)	
4 Jan	2 Apr	Championship League Invitational†	Ballroom, Stadium MK in Milton Keynes, England	Kyren Wilson (ENG)	3‍–‍2	Mark Williams (WAL)	
17 Apr	3 May	World Championship	Crucible Theatre in Sheffield, England	Mark Selby (ENG)	18‍–‍15	Shaun Murphy (ENG)	

Ranking event
† Non-ranking event

European Series champion and Betvictor bonus winner: Judd Trump (ENG) for the second year running.

=== World Seniors Tour ===
Start	Finish	Tournament	Venue	Winner	Score	Runner-up	Ref.
6 May	9 May	World Seniors Championship	Crucible Theatre in Sheffield, England	David Lilley (ENG)	5‍–‍3	Jimmy White (ENG)	

== World ranking points ==
The 2020–21 snooker season featured the following points distribution for World Snooker Tour ranking events:

Round Tournament	R144	R128	R112	R96	R80	R64	R48	R32	R28	R24	R20	R16	R12	QF	R7	R6	R5	SF	R3	F	W
European Masters	—N/a	0	—N/a	—N/a	—N/a	3,000	—N/a	4,000	—N/a	—N/a	—N/a	6,000	—N/a	11,000	—N/a	—N/a	—N/a	17,500	—N/a	35,000	80,000
English Open	—N/a	0	—N/a	—N/a	—N/a	3,000	—N/a	4,000	—N/a	—N/a	—N/a	7,500	—N/a	10,000	—N/a	—N/a	—N/a	20,000	—N/a	30,000	70,000
Championship League	—N/a	0 (Note: First stage fourth-placed)	—N/a	1,000 (Note: First stage third-placed)	—N/a	2,000 (Note: First stage runner-up)	—N/a	4,000 (Note: Second stage fourth-placed)	—N/a	5,000 (Note: Second stage third-placed)	—N/a	6,000 (Note: Second stage runner-up)	—N/a	8,000 (Note: Third stage fourth-placed)	—N/a	9,000 (Note: Third stage third-placed)	—N/a	11,000 (Note: Third stage runner-up)	—N/a	23,000	33,000
Northern Ireland Open	—N/a	0	—N/a	—N/a	—N/a	3,000	—N/a	4,000	—N/a	—N/a	—N/a	7,500	—N/a	10,000	—N/a	—N/a	—N/a	20,000	—N/a	30,000	70,000
UK Championship	—N/a	0	—N/a	—N/a	—N/a	6,500	—N/a	12,000	—N/a	—N/a	—N/a	17,000	—N/a	24,500	—N/a	—N/a	—N/a	40,000	—N/a	80,000	200,000
Scottish Open	—N/a	0	—N/a	—N/a	—N/a	3,000	—N/a	4,000	—N/a	—N/a	—N/a	7,500	—N/a	10,000	—N/a	—N/a	—N/a	20,000	—N/a	30,000	70,000
World Grand Prix	—N/a	—N/a	—N/a	—N/a	—N/a	—N/a	—N/a	5,000 (Note: First round losers in the Shoot Out, World Grand Prix, Players Championship and Tour Championship will receive their prize money in full however this money will not count towards the prize money rankings)	—N/a	—N/a	—N/a	7,500	—N/a	12,500	—N/a	—N/a	—N/a	20,000	—N/a	40,000	100,000
German Masters	—N/a	0	—N/a	—N/a	—N/a	3,000	—N/a	4,000	—N/a	—N/a	—N/a	5,000	—N/a	10,000	—N/a	—N/a	—N/a	20,000	—N/a	35,000	80,000
Shoot Out	—N/a	250	—N/a	—N/a	—N/a	500	—N/a	1,000	—N/a	—N/a	—N/a	2,000	—N/a	4,000	—N/a	—N/a	—N/a	8,000	—N/a	20,000	50,000
Welsh Open	—N/a	0	—N/a	—N/a	—N/a	3,000	—N/a	4,000	—N/a	—N/a	—N/a	7,500	—N/a	10,000	—N/a	—N/a	—N/a	20,000	—N/a	30,000	70,000
Players Championship	—N/a	—N/a	—N/a	—N/a	—N/a	—N/a	—N/a	—N/a	—N/a	—N/a	—N/a	10,000	—N/a	15,000	—N/a	—N/a	—N/a	30,000	—N/a	50,000	125,000
Gibraltar Open	—N/a	0	—N/a	—N/a	—N/a	2,000	—N/a	3,000	—N/a	—N/a	—N/a	4,000	—N/a	5,000	—N/a	—N/a	—N/a	6,000	—N/a	20,000	50,000
WST Pro Series	—N/a	0 (Note: First stage eighth-placed)	500 (Note: First stage seventh-placed)	1,000 (Note: First stage sixth-placed)	1,500 (Note: First stage fifth-placed)	2,000 (Note: First stage fourth-placed)	2,500 (Note: First stage third-placed)	4,000 (Note: First stage second-placed, Second stage eighth-placed); 5,000 (Note: First stage first-placed, Second stage eighth-placed)	4,500 (Note: First stage second-placed, Second stage seventh-placed); 5,500 (Note: First stage first-placed, Second stage seventh-placed)	5,000 (Note: First stage second-placed, Second stage sixth-placed); 6,000 (Note: First stage first-placed, Second stage sixth-placed)	6,000 (Note: First stage second-placed, Second stage fifth-placed); 7,000 (Note: First stage first-placed, Second stage fifth-placed)	7,000 (Note: First stage second-placed, Second stage fourth-placed); 8,000 (Note: First stage first-placed, Second stage fourth-placed)	8,000 (Note: First stage second-placed, Second stage third-placed); 9,000 (Note: First stage first-placed, Second stage third-placed)	11,500 (Note: First stage second-placed, Second stage second-placed, Third stage eighth-placed); 12,500 (Note: First stage first-placed, Second stage second-placed, Third stage eighth-placed); 14,000 (Note: First stage second-placed, Second stage first-placed, Third stage eighth-placed); 15,000 (Note: First stage first-placed, Second stage first-placed, Third stage eighth-placed)	12,500 (Note: First stage second-placed, Second stage second-placed, Third stage seventh-placed); 13,500 (Note: First stage first-placed, Second stage second-placed, Third stage seventh-placed); 15,000 (Note: First stage second-placed, Second stage first-placed, Third stage seventh-placed); 16,000 (Note: First stage first-placed, Second stage first-placed, Third stage seventh-placed)	13,500 (Note: First stage second-placed, Second stage second-placed, Third stage sixth-placed); 14,500 (Note: First stage first-placed, Second stage second-placed, Third stage sixth-placed); 16,000 (Note: First stage second-placed, Second stage first-placed, Third stage sixth-placed); 17,000 (Note: First stage first-placed, Second stage first-placed, Third stage sixth-placed)	14,500 (Note: First stage second-placed, Second stage second-placed, Third stage fifth-placed); 15,500 (Note: First stage first-placed, Second stage second-placed, Third stage fifth-placed); 17,000 (Note: First stage second-placed, Second stage first-placed, Third stage fifth-placed); 18,000 (Note: First stage first-placed, Second stage first-placed, Third stage fifth-placed)	15,500 (Note: First stage second-placed, Second stage second-placed, Third stage fourth-placed); 16,500 (Note: First stage first-placed, Second stage second-placed, Third stage fourth-placed); 18,000 (Note: First stage second-placed, Second stage first-placed, Third stage fourth-placed); 19,000 (Note: First stage first-placed, Second stage first-placed, Third stage fourth-placed)	18,000 (Note: First stage second-placed, Second stage second-placed, Third stage third-placed); 19,000 (Note: First stage first-placed, Second stage second-placed, Third stage third-placed); 20,500 (Note: First stage second-placed, Second stage first-placed, Third stage third-placed); 21,500 (Note: First stage first-placed, Second stage first-placed, Third stage third-placed)	20,500 (Note: First stage second-placed, Second stage second-placed, Third stage second-placed); 21,500 (Note: First stage first-placed, Second stage second-placed, Third stage second-placed); 23,000 (Note: First stage second-placed, Second stage first-placed, Third stage second-placed); 24,000 (Note: First stage first-placed, Second stage first-placed, Third stage second-placed)	30,500 (Note: First stage second-placed, Second stage second-placed, Third stage first-placed); 31,500 (Note: First stage first-placed, Second stage second-placed, Third stage first-placed); 33,000 (Note: First stage second-placed, Second stage first-placed, Third stage first-placed); 34,000 (Note: First stage first-placed, Second stage first-placed, Third stage first-placed)
Tour Championship	—N/a	—N/a	—N/a	—N/a	—N/a	—N/a	—N/a	—N/a	—N/a	—N/a	—N/a	—N/a	—N/a	20,000	—N/a	—N/a	—N/a	40,000	—N/a	60,000	150,000
World Championship	0	—N/a	5,000 (Note: Players who lose their first match receive no ranking points.)	—N/a	10,000	—N/a	15,000	20,000	—N/a	—N/a	—N/a	30,000	—N/a	50,000	—N/a	—N/a	—N/a	100,000	—N/a	200,000	500,000
