= 2021 Welsh Open (snooker) =

Snooker tournament

2021 BetVictor Welsh Open
Tournament information
- Dates: 15–21 February 2021
- Venue: Celtic Manor Resort
- City: Newport
- Country: Wales
- Organisation: World Snooker Tour
- Format: Ranking event
- Total prize fund: £405,000
- Winner's share: £70,000
- Highest break: Zhao Xintong (CHN) (143)

Final
- Champion: Jordan Brown (NIR)
- Runner-up: Ronnie O'Sullivan (ENG)
- Score: 9–8

The 2021 Welsh Open (officially the 2021 BetVictor Welsh Open) was a professional snooker tournament that took place from 15 to 21 February 2021 at the Celtic Manor Resort in Newport, Wales. It was the 10th ranking event of the 2020–21 snooker season and the 30th edition of the Welsh Open, first held in 1992. It was the fifth of six tournaments in the European Series and the fourth and final event of the Home Nations Series. The event was sponsored by sports betting company BetVictor, with the winner being awarded £70,000 from a total prize fund of £405,000.

Shaun Murphy was the defending champion, having won the 2020 event with a 9–1 victory over Kyren Wilson in the final. However, Murphy lost 5–4 to Stephen Maguire in the quarter-finals. Jordan Brown defeated Ronnie O'Sullivan 9–8 in the final to win the first ranking title of his career. Ranked 81st in the world, Brown became the lowest-ranked player to win a ranking event since world number 93 Dave Harold won the 1993 Asian Open.

== Format ==
The Welsh Open began as a ranking tournament in 1992. The 2021 tournament took place at the Celtic Manor Resort in Newport between 15 and 21 February, the thirtieth edition of the event. It was the tenth World Snooker Tour ranking competition in the 2020-21 snooker season, following the Snooker Shoot Out and preceding the 2021 Players Championship. It was the fifth of six events in the BetVictor European Series and the fourth and final event of the Home Nations Series.

The defending Welsh Open champion from 2020 was Shaun Murphy who won the final with a 9–1 victory over Kyren Wilson. All matches were best-of-seven frames until the quarter-finals, which were the best-of-nine, the semi-finals the best-of-eleven. The final was played over two sessions, as the best-of-17 frames. The event was sponsored by sports betting company BetVictor, and broadcast locally by BBC Cymru Wales. It was also broadcast by Quest in the United Kingdom; Eurosport in Europe; CCTV5, Youku, Zhibo.tv and Migu in China; Now TV in Hong Kong; True Sport in Thailand; Sky Sports in New Zealand; DAZN in Canada; and Astrosport in Malaysia. In all other locations it was broadcast by Matchroom Sport.

=== Prize Fund ===
The event's total prize fund was £405,000, with the winner receiving £70,000. The player accumulating the highest amount of prize money over the six events received a bonus of £150,000. The breakdown of prize money is shown below:

- Winner: £70,000
- Runner-up: £30,000
- Semi-final: £20,000
- Quarter-final: £10,000
- Last 16: £7,500
- Last 32: £4,000
- Last 64: £3,000
- Highest break: £5,000
- Total: £405,000

== Summary ==
=== Early rounds ===
The first two rounds of the competition were played between 15 and 17 February, with rounds three and four on 18 February. Defending champion Shaun Murphy was 20th in the one year ranking event, and required to gain four places to play in the next event, the Players Championship. Murphy reached the last 16 with wins over Zak Surety, Stuart Carrington, Ryan Day and Stuart Bingham. World number one Judd Trump defeated Chinese players Zhao Jianbo and Si Jiahui but lost in the third round to Iranian player Hossein Vafaei 2–4.

Two-time winner Mark Williams defeated Michael White 4–1 in the first round, with an average shot time of only 15 seconds. Williams later commented that "I’m going to play as fast as I can and get in and out as quick as I can. I’m actually going to see if I can get one match down as quick as ten seconds a shot. That’s my goal for the rest of the season." Williams defeated Liam Highfield, Joe Perry and Vafaei to reach the quarter-finals. Mark Selby made a break of 134 in his opening round win over Barry Pinches, but missed the final pink ball when on route to a maximum break. Selby then defeated Jamie O'Neill, Joe O'Connor and Masters champion Yan Bingtao to reach the quarter-finals. Jordan Brown defeated Luo Honghao, Sam Craigie and Alexander Ursenbacher before beating Mark King 4–3 to reach his second ranking quarter-final of his career.

Ali Carter defeated Daniel Wells and Aaron Hill before beating both John Higgins and Mark Allen to reach the quarter-finals. Ronnie O'Sullivan lost only one frame in his first four matches to reach the quarter-finals, whitewashing three players. Eighth seed Stephen Maguire defeated two Welshmen in Dominic Dale and Matthew Stevens before beating Matthew Selt and Pang Junxu to reach the last eight.

=== Quarter-finals–final ===
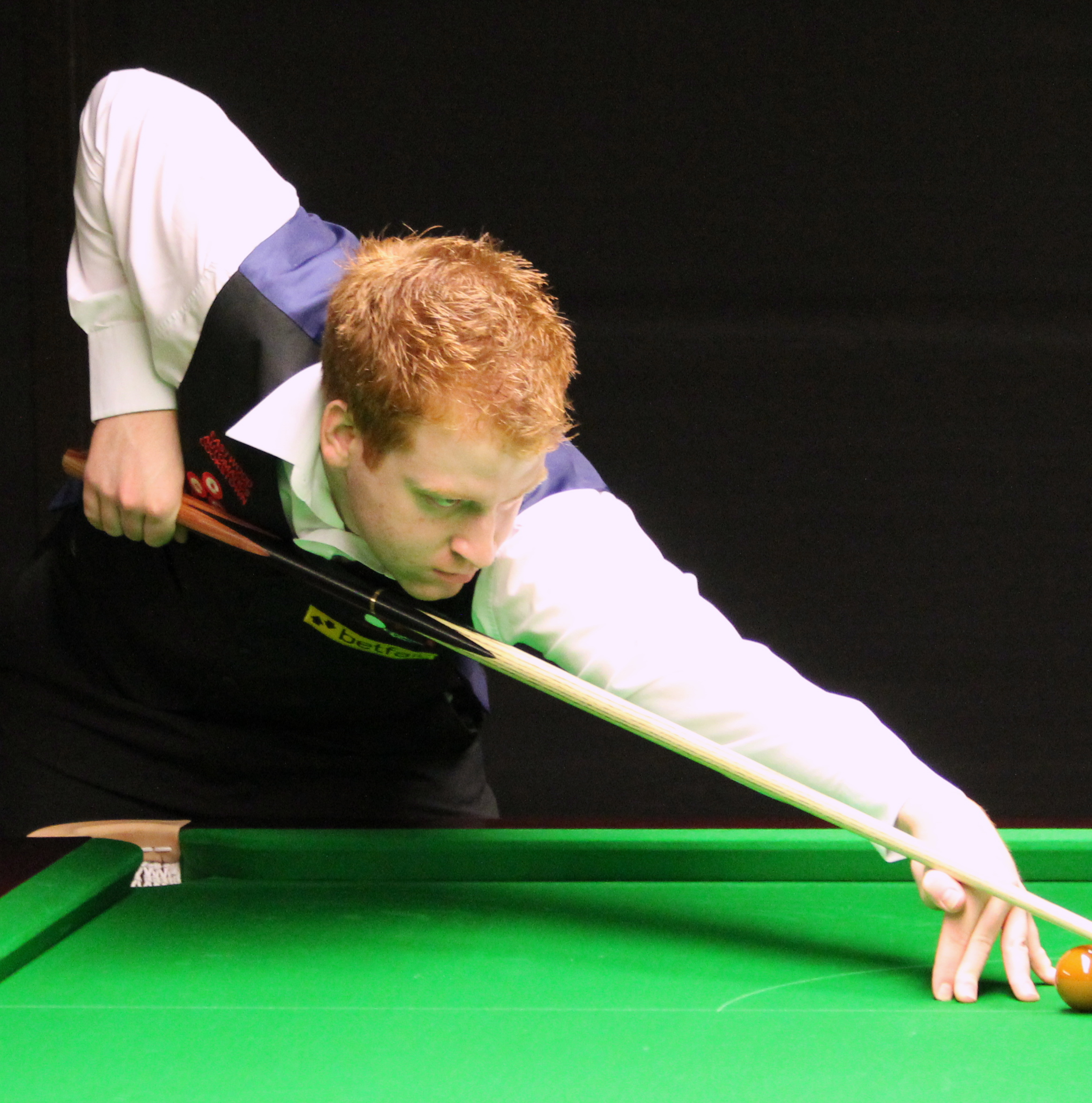
Jordan Brown (pictured in 2012) won his first ranking event with a 9–8 win over Ronnie O'Sullivan

The quarter-finals were played as the best-of-9 frames matches on 19 February. Ali Carter withdrew from the event shortly before his match against Ronnie O'Sullivan due to health concerns. The remaining three quarter-finals all went to a deciding frame. Murphy, the defending champion, was defeated 4–5 by Maguire. He made breaks of 105, 84, 55, 90 and 133 to defeat Murphy. In losing the match, Murphy was unable to qualify for the Players Championship, finishing 17th in the one-year rankings. Playing in the second ranking quarter-final of his career, Jordan Brown met Mark Selby. The match lasted three hours and 48 minutes and with the scores tied at 4–4, Selby missed the final black ball into the centre pocket, which Brown potted to win the match. Mark Williams defeated Tom Ford 5–4 in the final quarter-final match which decided which of the two players would qualify for the Players Championship.

The semi-finals were played as the best-of-11 frame matches on 20 February. Williams took the opening frame in his match against O'Sullivan, before his opponent won the next six successive frames. O'Sullivan commented "I knew he was playing well and scoring well. I had to be on my guard. I played pretty solidly." The other semi-final was played between Jordan Brown and Steven Maguire. Brown made a break of 135 in the opening frame, before Maguire tied the scores at 1–1. Brown then made breaks of 56, 113 and 59 winning the next five frames to take the match 6–1. Brown commented "Three years ago I was working in a petrol station and serving customers... To be in a ranking tournament final is just incredible".

The final was played as the best-of-17 frames held over two sessions. Brown was playing in his first ranking event final; whilst his opponent O'Sullivan was playing in his 56th. Brown took the first two frames of the match before O'Sullivan won frame three. Brown won frame four with a break of 78 and led 4–1 after a century break. The next two frames were won by O'Sullivan, however, Brown took the next frame to lead 5–3 after the first session. After the break, O'Sullivan won the next three frames to take the lead, but Brown leveled the match in frame 12 to 6–6, and level again at 7–7. In frame 15, O'Sullivan missed a pot on the pink ball and showed signs of frustration. Brown made a break of 56 to lead 8–7. The match was taken into a deciding frame after a break of 119 by O'Sullivan. Brown won the match 9–8 after a break of 74. Ranked 81st in the world, Brown became the lowest-ranked player to win a ranking event since world number 93 Dave Harold won the 1993 Asian Open. He also became the first Northern Irish player to win a Welsh Open title.

== Tournament draw ==
Below is the main draw for the event. Numbers in brackets denote seeded players. Players in bold denote match winners.

=== Top half ===
==== Section 1 ====
Last 128; Best of 7 frames
**Shaun Murphy (ENG) (1)**	**4**
Zak Surety (ENG)	1
**Stuart Carrington (ENG)**	**4**
Soheil Vahedi (IRN)	1
**Ryan Day (WAL) (32)**	**4**
Ian Burns (ENG)	3
Lee Walker (WAL)	1
**Mark Davis (ENG)**	**4**
**Anthony McGill (SCO) (16)**	**4**
Louis Heathcote (ENG)	0
Andy Hicks (ENG)	3
**David Lilley (ENG)**	**4**
**Barry Hawkins (ENG) (17)**	**4**
Chris Wakelin (ENG)	1
**Simon Lichtenberg (GER)**	**4**
Riley Parsons (ENG)	2

Last 64; Best of 7 frames
**(England) Shaun Murphy (1)**	**4**
(England) Stuart Carrington	1
**(Wales) Ryan Day (32)**	**4**
(England) Mark Davis	3
**(Scotland) Anthony McGill (16)**	**4**
(England) David Lilley	0
**(England) Barry Hawkins (17)**	**4**
(Germany) Simon Lichtenberg	0

Last 32; Best of 7 frames
**(England) Shaun Murphy (1)**	**4**
(Wales) Ryan Day (32)	1
(Scotland) Anthony McGill (16)	3
**(England) Barry Hawkins (17)**	**4**

Last 16; Best of 7 frames
**(England) Shaun Murphy (1)**	**4**
(England) Barry Hawkins (17)	3

==== Section 2 ====
Last 128; Best of 7 frames
Li Hang (CHN)	0
**Martin O'Donnell (ENG)**	**4**
Kurt Maflin (NOR) (24)	w/d
**Ken Doherty (IRL)**	**w/o**
Allan Taylor (ENG)	0
**Pang Junxu (CHN)**	**4**
**Ding Junhui (CHN) (9)**	**4**
Lyu Haotian (CHN)	1
Jamie Clarke (WAL)	0
**Oliver Lines (ENG)**	**4**
**Matthew Selt (ENG) (25)**	**4**
Lukas Kleckers (GER)	0
James Cahill (ENG)	0
**Matthew Stevens (WAL)**	**4**
**Stephen Maguire (SCO) (8)**	**4**
Dominic Dale (WAL)	1

Last 64; Best of 7 frames
**(England) Martin O'Donnell**	**4**
(Republic of Ireland) Ken Doherty	0
**(China) Pang Junxu**	**4**
(China) Ding Junhui (9)	2
(England) Oliver Lines	0
**(England) Matthew Selt (25)**	**4**
(Wales) Matthew Stevens	1
**(Scotland) Stephen Maguire (8)**	**4**

Last 32; Best of 7 frames
(England) Martin O'Donnell	2
**(China) Pang Junxu**	**4**
(England) Matthew Selt (25)	2
**(Scotland) Stephen Maguire (8)**	**4**

Last 16; Best of 7 frames
(China) Pang Junxu	2
**(Scotland) Stephen Maguire (8)**	**4**

==== Section 3 ====
Last 128; Best of 7 frames
**Mark Selby (ENG) (5)**	**4**
Barry Pinches (ENG)	1
Sean Maddocks (ENG)	3
**Jamie O'Neill (ENG)**	**4**
Liang Wenbo (CHN) (28)	1
**Joe O'Connor (ENG)**	**4**
Eden Sharav (ISR)	2
**Andrew Higginson (ENG)**	**4**
**Yan Bingtao (CHN) (12)**	**4**
Xu Si (CHN)	1
**Brian Ochoiski (FRA)**	**4**
Paul Davison (ENG)	1
**Gary Wilson (ENG) (21)**	**4**
Ashley Hugill (ENG)	2
**Xiao Guodong (CHN)**	**4**
Iulian Boiko (UKR)	0

Last 64; Best of 7 frames
**(England) Mark Selby (5)**	**4**
(England) Jamie O'Neill	1
**(England) Joe O'Connor**	**4**
(England) Andrew Higginson	1
**(China) Yan Bingtao (12)**	**4**
(France) Brian Ochoiski	0
(England) Gary Wilson (21)	1
**(China) Xiao Guodong**	**4**

Last 32; Best of 7 frames
**(England) Mark Selby (5)**	**4**
(England) Joe O'Connor	3
**(China) Yan Bingtao (12)**	**4**
(China) Xiao Guodong	1

Last 16; Best of 7 frames
**(England) Mark Selby (5)**	**4**
(China) Yan Bingtao (12)	2

==== Section 4 ====
Last 128; Best of 7 frames
**Jordan Brown (NIR)**	**4**
Luo Honghao (CHN)	0
Thepchaiya Un-Nooh (THA) (20)	3
**Sam Craigie (ENG)**	**4**
**Alexander Ursenbacher (SUI)**	**4**
Noppon Saengkham (THA)	1
Stuart Bingham (ENG) (13)	2
**Robert Milkins (ENG)**	**4**
**Jak Jones (WAL)**	**4**
Fan Zhengyi (CHN)	3
Michael Holt (ENG) (29)	0
**David Grace (ENG)**	**4**
Yuan Sijun (CHN)	1
**Jamie Jones (WAL)**	**4**
Neil Robertson (AUS) (4)	w/d
**Mark King (ENG)**	**w/o**

Last 64; Best of 7 frames
**(Northern Ireland) Jordan Brown**	**4**
(England) Sam Craigie	3
**(Switzerland) Alexander Ursenbacher**	**4**
(England) Robert Milkins	3
**(Wales) Jak Jones**	**4**
(England) David Grace	2
(Wales) Jamie Jones	3
**(England) Mark King**	**4**

Last 32; Best of 7 frames
**(Northern Ireland) Jordan Brown**	**4**
(Switzerland) Alexander Ursenbacher	3
(Wales) Jak Jones	2
**(England) Mark King**	**4**

Last 16; Best of 7 frames
**(Northern Ireland) Jordan Brown**	**4**
(England) Mark King	3

=== Bottom half ===
==== Section 5 ====
Last 128; Best of 7 frames
**Judd Trump (ENG) (3)**	**4**
Zhao Jianbo (CHN)	2
**Si Jiahui (CHN)**	**4**
Brandon Sargeant (ENG)	2
**Zhao Xintong (CHN) (30)**	**4**
Luca Brecel (BEL)	2
Peter Lines (ENG)	2
**Hossein Vafaei (IRN)**	**4**
**Mark Williams (WAL) (14)**	**4**
Michael White (WAL)	1
Jamie Curtis-Barrett (ENG)	3
**Liam Highfield (ENG)**	**4**
**Joe Perry (ENG) (19)**	**4**
Chang Bingyu (CHN)	3
Lu Ning (CHN)	3
**Dylan Emery (WAL)**	**4**

Last 64; Best of 7 frames
**(England) Judd Trump (3)**	**4**
(China) Si Jiahui	2
(China) Zhao Xintong (30)	3
**(Iran) Hossein Vafaei**	**4**
**(Wales) Mark Williams (14)**	**4**
(England) Liam Highfield	1
**(England) Joe Perry (19)**	**4**
(Wales) Dylan Emery	1

Last 32; Best of 7 frames
(England) Judd Trump (3)	2
**(Iran) Hossein Vafaei**	**4**
**(Wales) Mark Williams (14)**	**4**
(England) Joe Perry (19)	2

Last 16; Best of 7 frames
(Iran) Hossein Vafaei	2
**(Wales) Mark Williams (14)**	**4**

==== Section 6 ====
Last 128; Best of 7 frames
**Ricky Walden (ENG)**	**4**
Jackson Page (WAL)	1
**Graeme Dott (SCO) (22)**	**4**
Billy Castle (ENG)	1
**Sunny Akani (THA)**	**4**
Igor Figueiredo (BRA)	1
**Jack Lisowski (ENG) (11)**	**4**
Lei Peifan (CHN)	3
**Elliot Slessor (ENG)**	**4**
Ben Fortey (WAL)	2
**Tom Ford (ENG) (27)**	**4**
Peter Devlin (ENG)	0
Tian Pengfei (CHN)	0
**Alan McManus (SCO)**	**4**
**Kyren Wilson (ENG) (6)**	**4**
Chen Zifan (CHN)	2

Last 64; Best of 7 frames
**(England) Ricky Walden**	**4**
(Scotland) Graeme Dott (22)	3
(Thailand) Sunny Akani	2
**(England) Jack Lisowski (11)**	**4**
(England) Elliot Slessor	3
**(England) Tom Ford (27)**	**4**
(Scotland) Alan McManus	2
**(England) Kyren Wilson (6)**	**4**

Last 32; Best of 7 frames
(England) Ricky Walden	2
**(England) Jack Lisowski (11)**	**4**
**(England) Tom Ford (27)**	**4**
(England) Kyren Wilson (6)	3

Last 16; Best of 7 frames
(England) Jack Lisowski (11)	3
**(England) Tom Ford (27)**	**4**

==== Section 7 ====
Last 128; Best of 7 frames
**John Higgins (SCO) (7)**	**4**
Steven Hallworth (ENG)	1
**Ben Woollaston (ENG)**	**w/o**
Alex Borg (MLT)	w/d
**Ali Carter (ENG) (26)**	**4**
Daniel Wells (WAL)	3
Fergal O'Brien (IRL)	2
**Aaron Hill (IRL)**	**4**
**Mark Allen (NIR) (10)**	**4**
Fraser Patrick (SCO)	2
**Nigel Bond (ENG)**	**4**
Rod Lawler (ENG)	2
**Scott Donaldson (SCO) (23)**	**4**
Gao Yang (CHN)	2
**Gerard Greene (NIR)**	**4**
Farakh Ajaib (PAK)	3

Last 64; Best of 7 frames
**(Scotland) John Higgins (7)**	**4**
(England) Ben Woollaston	3
**(England) Ali Carter (26)**	**4**
(Republic of Ireland) Aaron Hill	1
**(Northern Ireland) Mark Allen (10)**	**4**
(England) Nigel Bond	2
**(Scotland) Scott Donaldson (23)**	**4**
(Northern Ireland) Gerard Greene	2

Last 32; Best of 7 frames
(Scotland) John Higgins (7)	3
**(England) Ali Carter (26)**	**4**
**(Northern Ireland) Mark Allen (10)**	**4**
(Scotland) Scott Donaldson (23)	3

Last 16; Best of 7 frames
**(England) Ali Carter (26)**	**4**
(Northern Ireland) Mark Allen (10)	2

==== Section 8 ====
Last 128; Best of 7 frames
**Anthony Hamilton (ENG)**	**4**
Ben Hancorn (ENG)	3
**Zhou Yuelong (CHN) (18)**	**4**
Ashley Carty (ENG)	0
**Jamie Wilson (ENG)**	**4**
Duane Jones (WAL)	3
**David Gilbert (ENG) (15)**	**4**
Rory McLeod (JAM)	0
**Jimmy Robertson (ENG)**	**4**
Kacper Filipiak (POL)	1
**Martin Gould (ENG) (31)**	**4**
Mitchell Mann (ENG)	0
Mark Joyce (ENG)	w/d
**Jimmy White (ENG)**	**w/o**
**Ronnie O'Sullivan (ENG) (2)**	**4**
Robbie Williams (ENG)	0

Last 64; Best of 7 frames
(England) Anthony Hamilton	0
**(China) Zhou Yuelong (18)**	**4**
(England) Jamie Wilson	0
**(England) David Gilbert (15)**	**4**
(England) Jimmy Robertson	0
**(England) Martin Gould (31)**	**4**
(England) Jimmy White	0
**(England) Ronnie O'Sullivan (2)**	**4**

Last 32; Best of 7 frames
**(China) Zhou Yuelong (18)**	**4**
(England) David Gilbert (15)	2
(England) Martin Gould (31)	0
**(England) Ronnie O'Sullivan (2)**	**4**

Last 16; Best of 7 frames
(China) Zhou Yuelong (18)	1
**(England) Ronnie O'Sullivan (2)**	**4**

=== Finals ===
**Quarter-finals**; Best of 9 frames
(England) Shaun Murphy (1)	4
**(Scotland) Stephen Maguire (8)**	**5**
(England) Mark Selby (5)	4
**(Northern Ireland) Jordan Brown**	**5**
**(Wales) Mark Williams (14)**	**5**
(England) Tom Ford (27)	4
(England) Ali Carter (26)	w/d
**(England) Ronnie O'Sullivan (2)**	**w/o**

**Semi-finals**; Best of 11 frames
(Scotland) Stephen Maguire (8)	4
**(Northern Ireland) Jordan Brown**	**6**
(Wales) Mark Williams (14)	1
**(England) Ronnie O'Sullivan (2)**	**6**

**Final**; Best of 17 frames
**(Northern Ireland) Jordan Brown**	**9**
(England) Ronnie O'Sullivan (2)	8

=== Final ===
Final: Best of 17 frames. Referee: Ben Williams; Celtic Manor Resort, Newport, Wales, 21 February 2021
**Jordan Brown**; Northern Ireland	**9**–8	Ronnie O'Sullivan (2); England
Afternoon: **59**–28, **66**–25, 0–**75**, **137**–0, **107**–0 (107), 0–**135** (135), 14–**121** (121), **67**–36; Evening: 44–**58**, 0–**68**, 8–**71**, **68**–43, **102**–24, 0–**64**, **69**–25, 0–**119** (119), **74**–1
107	Highest break	**135**
1	Century breaks	**3**

== Century breaks ==
There were 72 century breaks made during the event. The highest was a 143 made by Zhao Xintong in frame three of his first round win over Luca Brecel.

- 143 – Zhao Xintong
- 141 – Ryan Day
- 138, 135, 122, 121, 119, 102 – Ronnie O'Sullivan
- 138, 124, 107, 101 – Barry Hawkins
- 135, 113, 107, 105 – Jordan Brown
- 134, 131, 128, 109 – Mark Selby
- 134, 123, 101 – Scott Donaldson
- 133, 119, 107, 103 – Shaun Murphy
- 133, 105, 105, 104, 100 – Stephen Maguire
- 133 – Matthew Selt
- 132, 126, 123, 118, 101 – Zhou Yuelong
- 130, 124, 101 – John Higgins
- 130, 106 – Graeme Dott
- 130 – Billy Castle
- 128 – Martin Gould
- 127, 114, 113, 104 – Yan Bingtao
- 124 – Stuart Bingham
- 121 – Joe O'Connor
- 121 – Xiao Guodong
- 120 – Jack Lisowski
- 120 – Thepchaiya Un-Nooh
- 117 – Judd Trump
- 114, 101 – Anthony McGill
- 114 – Si Jiahui
- 113 – Fraser Patrick
- 110 – Pang Junxu
- 109 – Hossein Vafaei
- 107 – Soheil Vahedi
- 106 – Igor Figueiredo
- 106 – Ricky Walden
- 103 – Ali Carter
- 103 – Kyren Wilson
- 102 – Ding Junhui
- 102 – Andrew Higginson
- 101, 101 – David Gilbert
- 100 – Jamie Jones
- 100 – Lei Peifan
