= 2021 Tour Championship =

Snooker tournament

2021 Cazoo Tour Championship
Tournament information
- Dates: 22–28 March 2021
- Venue: Celtic Manor Resort
- City: Newport
- Country: Wales
- Organisation: World Snooker Tour
- Format: Ranking event
- Total prize fund: £380,000
- Winner's share: £150,000
- Highest break: Barry Hawkins (ENG) (138)

Final
- Champion: Neil Robertson (AUS)
- Runner-up: Ronnie O'Sullivan (ENG)
- Score: 10–4

The 2021 Tour Championship (officially the 2021 Cazoo Tour Championship) was a professional snooker tournament that took place from 22 to 28 March 2021 at the Celtic Manor Resort in Newport, Wales. Organised by the World Snooker Tour, it was the third edition of the Tour Championship and the third and final event of the third season of the Cazoo Cup. It was the 14th and penultimate ranking event of the 2020–21 snooker season, following the conclusion of the WST Pro Series and preceding the World Championship.

The draw for the Tour Championship comprised the top eight players based on the single year ranking list. The event was contested as a single-elimination tournament, each match being played over two sessions. The winner of the tournament received £150,000 out of a total prize fund of £380,000. The event was sponsored by car retailer Cazoo. The defending champion was Stephen Maguire, but as a result of reduced earnings during the season he was unable to qualify and defend the title. In a repeat of the 2019 final Australian Neil Robertson played Englishman Ronnie O'Sullivan. Robertson won the event defeating O'Sullivan 10–4 in the final. There were 26 century breaks made during the event, Barry Hawkins making the highest break, a 138.

== Overview ==
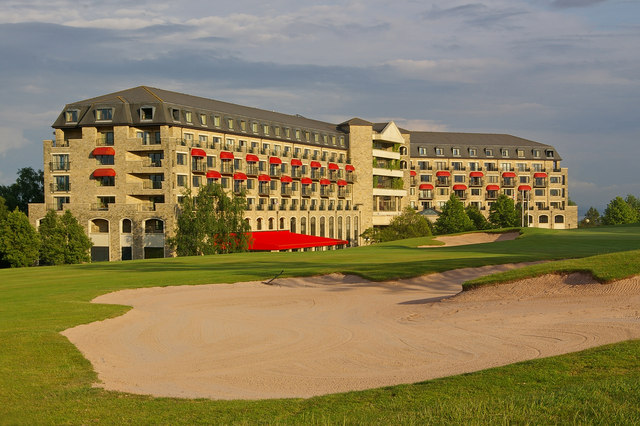
The tournament took place at the Celtic Manor Resort in Newport, Wales.

The 2021 Tour Championship (officially named 2021 Cazoo Tour Championship) was the third and final event in the 2020–21 Cazoo Cup series, first introduced in the 2018–19 snooker season, the first two being the World Grand Prix and the Players Championship. It was the 14th and penultimate ranking event of the 2020–21 snooker season, organised by the World Snooker Tour. The players qualified for the series by virtue of their placement on the one-year ranking list (the ranking points won over the course of the 2019–20 season), rather than by their world ranking positions. The Tour Championship featured the top eight players from the one-year ranking list taking part in a single-elimination tournament. All matches were played as the best of 19 frames.

The event took place at the Celtic Manor Resort in Newport, South Wales, between 22 and 28 March 2021. The tournament was domestically broadcast by ITV4 in the United Kingdom. It also aired on: Sky Sport in New Zealand; NowTV in Hong Kong; Superstars Online in China; and DAZN across the Americas, Germany, Italy and Spain. The event was sponsored by car retailer Cazoo.

=== Prize fund ===
The event had a prize fund of £380,000, the winner receiving £150,000. The breakdown of prize money for the event is shown below:

- Winner: £150,000
- Runner-up: £60,000
- Semi-final: £40,000
- Quarter-final: £20,000 (Prize money received at this stage does not count towards prize money rankings)
- Highest break: £10,000
- Total: £380,000

=== Qualification ===
The participants were determined on the basis of the one-year ranking list beginning from the first event, the 2020 European Masters, up to and including the 2021 WST Pro Series. Jordan Brown was the ninth ranked player, acting as the first travelling reserve for the event.

Rank	Player	Total points
1	Judd Trump (ENG)	523,500
2	Mark Selby (ENG)	280,500
3	Neil Robertson (AUS)	261,000
4	John Higgins (SCO)	199,500
5	Ronnie O'Sullivan (ENG)	173,500
6	Jack Lisowski (ENG)	164,500
7	Kyren Wilson (ENG)	161,000
8	Barry Hawkins (ENG)	121,500

== Summary ==
=== Quarter-finals ===
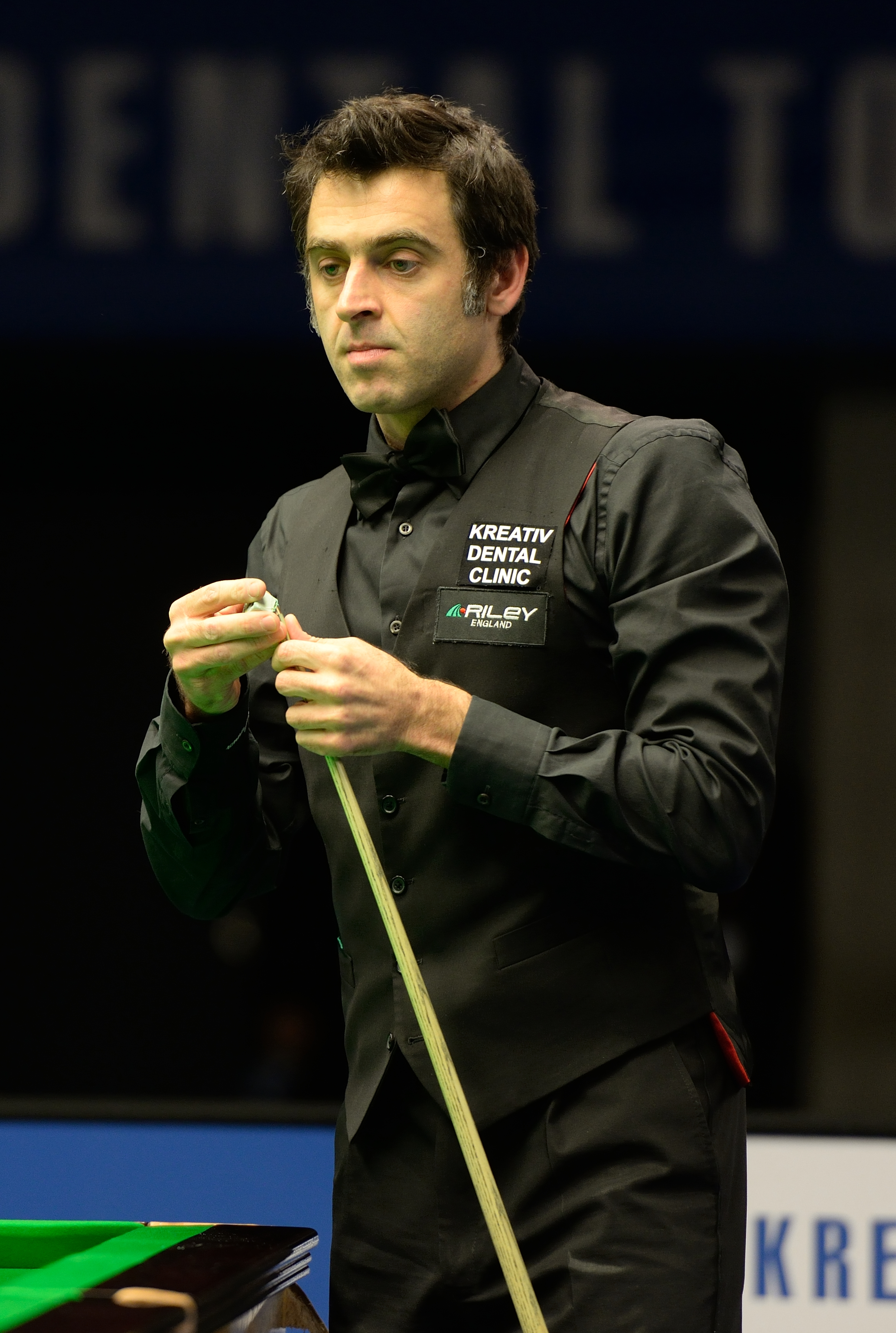
Ronnie O'Sullivan made his 1,100th career century break in his 10–8 win over John Higgins.

The first round of the event was the quarter-finals, held from 22 to 25 March 2021. The first match was held between Ronnie O'Sullivan and John Higgins, who had contested the final of the 2021 Players Championship, Higgins winning 10–3. O'Sullivan had won 37 of the 68 matches the pair had competed in since they turned professional in 1992. Higgins won the opening frame with a break of 72, before O'Sullivan won the next two frames to lead 2–1. Higgins made the first century break of the event in frame four, and the pair remained tied at 3–3. O'Sullivan won the final two frames of the session to lead 5–3. After the match, O'Sullivan commented that he had almost pulled out of the event due to his cue stick being in poor condition, and had sent it for repairs twice. O'Sullivan pulled ahead by three frames to 8–5 later in the match, making a break of 112, before Higgins made a 70 break in frame 15 to be one behind 7–8. O'Sullivan then made a break of 101, the 1,100th century break of his career. In frame 17 after O'Sullivan suffered a kick, he whacked his cue stick on the table in frustration, Higgins winning the frame. O'Sullivan won the match in frame 18, after Higgins missed a pot on the yellow ball.

Australian Neil Robertson met Jack Lisowski in the second quarter-final. Robertson won the opening frame, but Lisowski took the second, and later tied the match at 2–2. Lisowski only scored 39 more points over the next four frames, Robertson making two century breaks, and lead 6–2 between sessions. In the evening session, Lisowski won the first two frames, but Robertson won the next three to lead 9–4. In frame 14, Lisowski made a break of 129, before Robertson won the match 10–5 in frame 15. Robertson claimed that Lisowski would need a "killer instinct" to improve his game going forward.

The third quarter-final was held between English players Kyren Wilson and Mark Selby. Wilson won the opening frame before Selby made a break of 109 in the second. Selby also won the next two frames with breaks of 81 and 54. Wilson won frame five with a break of 83, but Selby won the remaining three frames of the first session, despite a break of 50 by Wilson in frame seven. Leading 6–2 after the first session, Selby made a clearance of 84 in frame nine, Wilson winning frame 10. Selby won the next frame with a break of 75, and won the match 10–3 with a break of 88 in frame 13. The match was the seventh time the two players had met in a professional match, Selby winning all of them. Barring the Snooker Shoot Out, a one-frame tournament, this was the only event in the season Wilson had not scored a single century break.

Judd Trump met Barry Hawkins in the last quarter-final. Hawkins won the first two frames with breaks of 70 and 90 before Trump equalled the score at 2–2, making a break of 119 in frame four. The next three frames were won by Hawkins, before Trump took frame eight to trail 3–5. Returning for the second session, Hawkins made a break of 121 in frame nine and won frame 10 to lead 7–3. Trump returned with breaks of 64 and 86 before the mid-session interval, and won frame 13 with a break of 86, to trail by a single frame. Hawkins won the next two frames including a break of 61 to lead 9–6. Hawkins had the first chance in frame 16, but his break of 45, where he misjudged the path of a red ball and was bested by a break of 94 by Trump. In a nervy 17th frame, Hawkins won the match 10–7 after potting a long brown ball. Hawkins later suggested that his loss to Trump at the 2021 German Masters, where he led 5–1, but lost 5–6 played on his mind: "I didn't throw the match away against Judd [Trump] (at the German Masters), but I nearly did the same thing tonight. If it goes 9–8 then I'm starting to feel it again."

=== Semi-finals ===
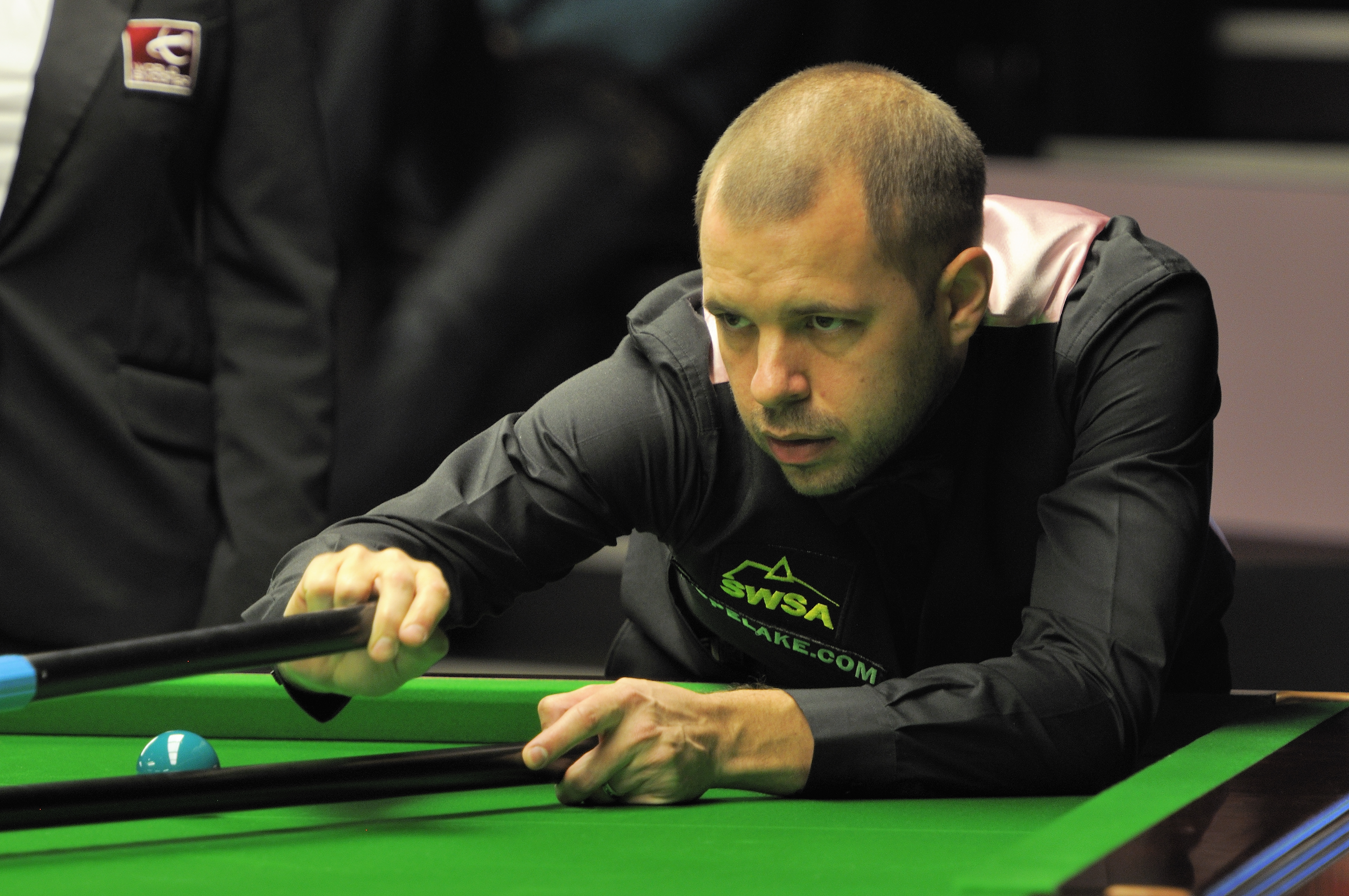
Barry Hawkins (pictured) led Ronnie O'Sullivan 9–6, but lost 9–10.

The semi-finals were played on 26 and 27 March. Robertson played Selby in the first and took the first two frames including a break of 114. In the third frame, Selby made a series of errors allowing Robertson to take the frame, and led 4–0 after a break of 77 in the next frame. Selby won two successive frames with breaks of 80 and 93. Robertson took the final two frames of the session to lead 6–2 after being left a free ball in frame eight. On the resumption, Robertson made a break of 136, before making breaks of 84 and 103 to lead 9–2. Selby won the next frame, but Roberston took frame 13 to complete a 10–3 victory. Robertson commented "My safety was fantastic, my long game was excellent – probably as good as it has been. I created a lot of opportunities", and cited his form was helped by not competing in some preceding events.

The second semi-final was played between O'Sullivan and Hawkins. O'Sullivan had won 15 of the 17 prior professional matches they had contested. Hawkins led the match 3–0, with breaks of 125 and 138, but O'Sullivan won four straight frames to lead 4–3. Hawkins took the final frame of the first session to tie the match at 4–4 with a break of 65. In the second session, O'Sullivan took frame nine, but Hawkins won the next three with breaks of 74, 50 and 103. O'Sullivan won frame 13 to trail 6–7 with a break of 78. Hawkins won the next two frames with breaks of 56 and 73 to lead 9–6. In frame 16, Hawkins led with a break of 46, but O'Sullivan won the frame with a break of 71, and took the next with a break of 90 to trail 8–9. O'Sullivan also won the next frame after Hawkins missed a green ball to send the match to a deciding frame. O'Sullivan led the final frame 48–0, but Hawkins missed a black ball meaning he required foul shots to win the match. He was unable to score the foul points, allowing O'Sullivan to win the match 10–9. After the match, O'Sullivan suggested that Hawkins deserved to win the match: "I feel for Barry, he's been grafting at his game, and he's been unlucky in a few results. He deserved that victory. It's a horrible way to lose, but hopefully he can respond from that."

=== Final ===
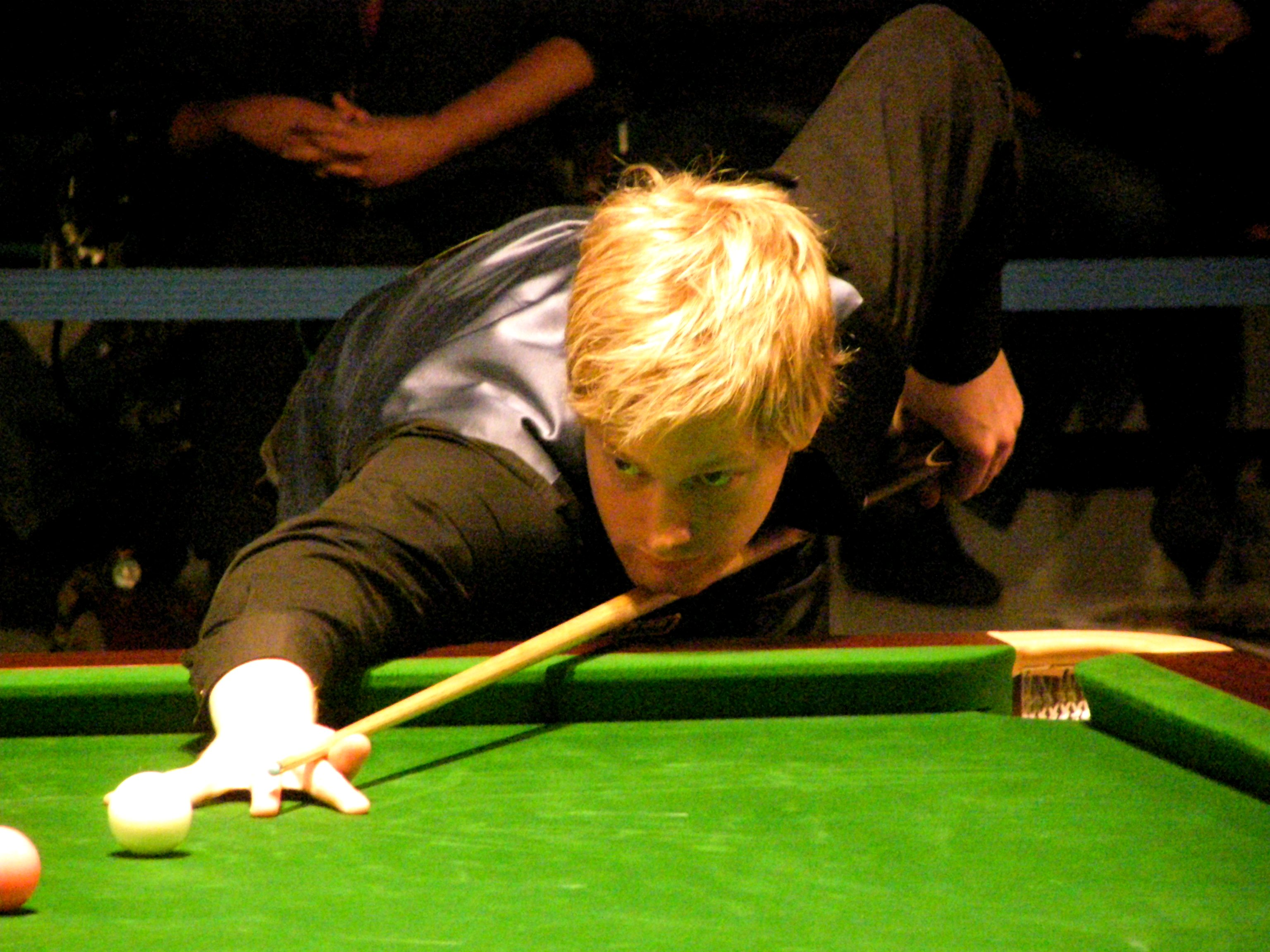
Neil Robertson (pictured) won the event, winning 10–4 in the final

The final was played between Robertson and O'Sullivan on 28 March. O'Sullivan won the opening frame, before a century break by Robertson tied the match 1–1. O'Sullivan made a century break of his own before Robertson tied the scores at 2–2. Robertson then moved into a 4–2 lead before O'Sullivan produced breaks of 68 and 133 to level the scores at 4–4. In the evening session, Robertson made breaks of 93 and 75 to lead 6–4 with O'Sullivan making mistakes in each frame. Robertson then made breaks of 123 and 119 to lead 8–4. In those four frames, he scored 442 points, to O'Sullivan's 16. Robertson won frame 13, before a 114 in frame 14 to win 10–4. The final featured seven century breaks, five by Robertson and two by O'Sullivan. Over the evening session, O'Sullivan accumulated only 26 points to Robertson's 650.

The loss was O'Sullivan's fifth loss in a ranking final in the season, having never lost more than three in a row previously. He praised Robertson's play after the match, saying "I’ve never seen anyone play as well as that... I can't compete with that." This was Robertson's 20th ranking event victory, and in winning the event, he was also able to collect the Cazoo Cup.

== Tournament draw ==
The scores from the tournament are shown below. Players in bold denote match winners.

**Quarter-finals**; Best of 19 frames
1	Judd Trump (ENG)	7
8	**Barry Hawkins** (ENG)	**10**
4	John Higgins (SCO)	8
5	**Ronnie O'Sullivan** (ENG)	**10**
3	**Neil Robertson** (AUS)	**10**
6	Jack Lisowski (ENG)	5
2	**Mark Selby** (ENG)	**10**
7	Kyren Wilson (ENG)	3

**Semi-finals**; Best of 19 frames
8	(England) Barry Hawkins	9
5	(England) **Ronnie O'Sullivan**	**10**
3	(Australia) **Neil Robertson**	**10**
2	(England) Mark Selby	3

**Final**; Best of 19 frames
5	(England) Ronnie O'Sullivan	4
3	(Australia) **Neil Robertson**	**10**

=== Final ===
Final: Best of 19 frames. Referee: Brendan Moore; Celtic Manor Resort, Newport, Wales, 28 March 2021
Ronnie O'Sullivan (5); England	4–**10**	**Neil Robertson** (3); Australia
Afternoon: **63**–17, 0–**103** (103), **128**–0 (128), 32–**78**, 0–**133** (133), 32–**80**, **133**–0 (133), **68**–52; Evening: 8–**93**, 0–**107**, 8–**123** (123), 0–**119** (119), 10–**101**, 0–**114** (114)
133	Highest break	133
2	Century breaks	**5**

== Cazoo Cup ==
The Cazoo Cup series features three events: the World Grand Prix, the Players Championship, and the Tour Championship. For all three events, qualification is based on players' rankings on the one-year ranking list. Neil Robertson won the most ranking points during the three events and won the Cazoo Cup. The top eight players in the Cazoo Cup series are shown below. Prizes in bold denote an event win.

Player	World Grand Prix	Players Championship	Tour Championship	Total
Neil Robertson (AUS)	0	15,000	**150,000**	**165,000**
John Higgins (SCO)	7,500	**125,000**	0	132,500
Ronnie O'Sullivan (ENG)	20,000	50,000	60,000	130,000
Judd Trump (ENG)	**100,000**	0	0	100,000
Barry Hawkins (ENG)	7,500	30,000	40,000	77,500
Mark Selby (ENG)	20,000	15,000	40,000	75,000
Jack Lisowski (ENG)	40,000	15,000	0	55,000
Kyren Wilson (ENG)	12,500	30,000	0	42,500

== Century breaks ==
There were 23 century breaks made during the tournament. Barry Hawkins made the highest, a 138 in the second frame of his semi-final match with O'Sullivan.

- 138, 125, 121, 103 – Barry Hawkins
- 136, 133, 123, 121, 119, 114, 114, 112, 106, 103, 103 – Neil Robertson
- 133, 128, 112, 101 – Ronnie O'Sullivan
- 129 – Jack Lisowski
- 119 – Judd Trump
- 109 – Mark Selby
- 101 – John Higgins
