= Migu =

Talmudic legal concept

Migu or miggo (translation: "since") (Hebrew: מיגו) is a Talmudic law concept relating to civil law disputes. A migu is a reason that a claim that would otherwise be rejected by a Jewish civil court should be accepted based on the fact that the litigant could have prevailed in the case based on a different claim were he disposed to lie. To be effective, the logic underlying the migu must be impeccable and there are a variety of cases in which the Migu argument is invalid.

== Example of an effective Migu ==
One classic example of where a Migu does work is in the area of a loan repayment dispute. Where the lender accuses an alleged borrower of defaulting on an oral loan made without witnesses, the borrower may prevail in the case by claiming that the loan did occur, but that it had already been repaid. Normally, when one makes a claim that a loan has been repaid, he would be expected to produce evidence that it had been repaid, such as a receipt. However, in this scenario the borrower would prevail under the theory that he must be telling the truth, as if he were interested in lying to the court, he could have simply said that the loan never happened. Since the lender cannot prove the existence of the loan, that claim would have prevailed. Therefore, the claim that the loan was repaid is believed as well. This is a classic Migu, although many cases of Migu exist to support a position in court.

Other cases in which Migu is invoked are cases in which witnesses might have a personal gain in testifying, which would normally disqualify the testimony. If another option can be found for the witnesses to achieve the same personal gain, some authorities rule that the testimony can be accepted.

== Exceptions to the rule ==
There are exceptions to the rule of Migu, perhaps the most common one is known as "Migu in the place of witnesses" (Hebrew מיגו במקום עדים). This takes on two meanings. The first is that in a case in which the claimant has irrefutable proof - such as valid witnesses - supporting his claim, the litigant cannot use Migu as a defense. The reasoning is that the witnesses are "stronger" than the Migu. (This means that in the order of acceptance of proofs and logic the court of law will rule based on the stronger proof/logic.) A second meaning to "Migu in the place of witnesses" is similar yet very different from the first. That is, when witnesses support the alternative claim, thereby destroying the litigant's position, as the litigant can no longer claim that if he was looking to win dishonestly he/she would have claimed the alternative. Because the alternative is no longer possible. This exception is true even if the witnesses bear testimony after the litigant made his/her claim. (see Rabbi Busel On Migu)

Another exception would be if the proposed alternative claim is considered to be an embarrassment to the defendant. Cases that would qualify are, if the story being told is embarrassing by its very nature, it is a highly unlikely story and a person would not be so brazen as to make the alternative claim (Hebrew, מיגו דהעזה לא אמרינן) or it is well known that the particular proposed fact is untrue, even if the claimant can't prove it. The logic behind this exception is elementary. The Migu lends credibility to the defendant by asking the question: "if he is lying in an effort to exempt himself from paying his dues, he should have told more believable lie". If the court can find a probable reason why he would avoid telling the harder-to-disprove story, then the entire logic falls apart.

A third rule in the non acception of Migu's is that "a Migu to extract is not said" (Hebrew מיגו להוציא לא אמרינן). This means that the logic of Migu will not be accepted on the claimants side. ("Why did he claim that the item used to belong to the possessing party and that he had bought it from him, he could have said that the item never belonged to the possessing party?"). The predominant reason for this is that the burden of proof is on the claimant (Hebrew המוציא מחבירו עליו הראיה) and therefore even though a defendant can avoid payment using the Migu as a defense, it is not sufficient proof for the claimant. Another point is that this would open endless opportunities for con men (Many Jewish laws are designed to make con games more difficult). This is the opinion of the Tosafists. The Ramban among other Rishonim disagree with this rule and contend that it is a valid reasoning. Some explain that the root of the question lies in understanding Migu's properties as a tool in court. The Tosafists felt that a Migu is a leverage tool (Hebrew, כח הטענה), meaning that if a person chose to make a less favorable claim over a more favorable one, he is given the benefit of the doubt, although he is not necessarily believed based on his Migu, therefore his Migu can only deflect charges but not charge others. The Ramban on the other hand felt that Migu provides proof of the legitimacy of the claim, it can therefore be used as an attack tool.
