= 2021 Players Championship (snooker) =

Snooker tournament

2021 Cazoo Players Championship
Tournament information
- Dates: 22–28 February 2021
- Venue: Marshall Arena
- City: Milton Keynes
- Country: England
- Organisation: World Snooker Tour
- Format: Ranking event
- Total prize fund: £385,000
- Winner's share: £125,000
- Highest break: Ronnie O'Sullivan (ENG) (144)

Final
- Champion: John Higgins (SCO)
- Runner-up: Ronnie O'Sullivan (ENG)
- Score: 10–3

The 2021 Players Championship (officially the 2021 Cazoo Players Championship) was a professional ranking snooker tournament, that took place from 22 to 28 February 2021 at the Marshall Arena in Milton Keynes. It was the 11th ranking event of the 2020–21 snooker season.

Judd Trump was the defending champion, having defeated Yan Bingtao 10–4 in the 2020 final. However, Trump lost 6–5 in the first round to Stuart Bingham.

The final was contested between John Higgins and Ronnie O'Sullivan, their first meeting in a ranking final since the 2005 Grand Prix, with Higgins winning 10–3. It was the 31st ranking title of Higgins's career, his first in three years, and he lost only four frames on his way to the title. This was O'Sullivan's 57th ranking final, equalling Stephen Hendry's record. There was a total of 30 century breaks made during the tournament, the highest of which was a 144 made by O'Sullivan in the final.

== Prize fund ==
The breakdown of prize money for the 2021 tournament is shown below:

- Winner: £125,000
- Runner-up: £50,000
- Semi-final: £30,000
- Quarter-final: £15,000
- Last 16: £10,000 (Prize money received at this stage will not count towards prize money rankings)
- Highest break: £10,000
- Total: £385,000

== Seeding list ==
The seedings were conducted on the basis of the one-year ranking list up to and including the 2021 Welsh Open.

Seed	Player	Total points
1	Judd Trump (ENG)	454,500
2	Mark Selby (ENG)	255,500
3	Neil Robertson (AUS)	246,000
4	Ronnie O'Sullivan (ENG)	123,500
5	Jack Lisowski (ENG)	117,000
6	Kyren Wilson (ENG)	112,000
7	Jordan Brown (NIR)	100,000
8	Zhou Yuelong (CHN)	83,500
9	Barry Hawkins (ENG)	80,500
10	John Higgins (SCO)	74,500
11	Ryan Day (WAL)	73,000
12	Martin Gould (ENG)	66,000
13	Ding Junhui (CHN)	65,500
14	Lu Ning (CHN)	59,500
15	Mark Williams (WAL)	53,500
16	Stuart Bingham (ENG)	53,000

== Tournament draw ==
Last 16; Best of 11 frames
1	Judd Trump (ENG)	5
16	Stuart Bingham (ENG)	6
8	Zhou Yuelong (CHN)	5
9	Barry Hawkins (ENG)	6
5	Jack Lisowski (ENG)	6
12	Martin Gould (ENG)	3
4	Ronnie O'Sullivan (ENG)	6
13	Ding Junhui (CHN)	5
3	Neil Robertson (AUS)	6
14	Lu Ning (CHN)	1
6	Kyren Wilson (ENG)	6
11	Ryan Day (WAL)	1
7	Jordan Brown (NIR)	0
10	John Higgins (SCO)	6
2	Mark Selby (ENG)	6
15	Mark Williams (WAL)	4

Quarter-finals; Best of 11 frames
16	(England) Stuart Bingham	2
9	(England) Barry Hawkins	6
5	(England) Jack Lisowski	1
4	(England) Ronnie O'Sullivan	6
3	(Australia) Neil Robertson	2
6	(England) Kyren Wilson	6
10	(Scotland) John Higgins	6
2	(England) Mark Selby	0

Semi-finals; Best of 11 frames
9	(England) Barry Hawkins	4
4	(England) Ronnie O'Sullivan	6
6	(England) Kyren Wilson	1
10	(Scotland) John Higgins	6

Final; Best of 19 frames
4	(England) Ronnie O'Sullivan	3
10	(Scotland) John Higgins	10

=== Final ===
Final: Best of 19 frames. Referee: Leo Scullion; Marshall Arena, Milton Keynes, England, 28 February 2021
Ronnie O'Sullivan (4); England	3–10	John Higgins (10); Scotland
Afternoon: 18–64, 0–103, 21–69, 0–142 (142), 0–138 (138), 87–26, 40–70, 148–0 (144); Evening: 4–67, 110–0 (110), 0–70, 0–77, 4–127 (127)
144	Highest break	142
2	Century breaks	3

== Century breaks ==
Total: 30

- 144, 125, 124, 110, 103 – Ronnie O'Sullivan
- 143, 109, 109 – Barry Hawkins
- 142, 138, 133, 127, 122, 121, 108, 100 – John Higgins
- 142, 135, 132, 130, 101 – Neil Robertson
- 130, 126, 119, 102 – Kyren Wilson
- 113, 112 – Stuart Bingham
- 109 – Zhou Yuelong
- 105 – Judd Trump
- 100 – Martin Gould
