= 2022–23 snooker world rankings =

Preceded by 2021–22	2022–23	Succeeded by 2023–24

The sport of professional snooker has had a world ranking system in place since 1976. Certain tournaments were given "ranking" status, with the results at those events contributing to a player's world ranking. The events that made up the 1976–77 snooker season were the first to award players with ranking points. Originally, the world rankings were decided based only on results in the World Snooker Championship, but other events were later added. The system used for the 2022–23 snooker season was first used in the 2010–11 season, where players won ranking points based entirely on prize money won from these events. The rankings are based on the prior two seasons, with eight revisions after specific tournaments throughout the season. These revisions are used as official rankings, with points awarded in the current season overwriting those from two years prior.

Ronnie O'Sullivan began the season as the highest ranked player and retained his position throughout the season, despite not winning any ranking titles or even making semi finals. O'Sullivan began the season with a lead of 26,500 points over second ranked Judd Trump, and finished the season above 2023 World Champion Luca Brecel by 9,500 points.

== Ranking list ==
=== Revision dates ===
Seedings for each event were based on the world rankings, with totals being updated at specific revision dates. On these dates, ranking points from the 2020–21 snooker season were removed from a player's total.

Revision dates
Revision point	Date	After	2020/2021 points dropped
1	30 July 2022	Championship League	–
2	22 August 2022	European Masters	–
3	3 October 2022	British Open	European Masters; English Open
4	24 October 2022	Northern Ireland Open	Championship League; Northern Ireland Open
5	21 November 2022	UK Championship	UK Championship
6	5 December 2022	Scottish Open	Scottish Open
7	19 December 2022	English Open	World Grand Prix
8	23 January 2023	World Grand Prix	–
9	30 January 2023	Shoot Out	Shoot Out
10	6 February 2023	German Masters	German Masters
11	20 February 2023	Welsh Open	Welsh Open
12	27 February 2023	Players Championship	Players Championship
13	20 March 2023	WST Classic	WST Pro Series; Gibraltar Open
14	3 April 2023	Tour Championship	Tour Championship
Total	2 May 2023	World Championship	World Championship

=== Seeding list ===
The following table contains the rankings which were used to determine the seedings for following tournaments. Other provisional and unofficial rankings are produced after each ranking event which are not noted here. Blank fields indicate that the player was not active on the tour, or had no ranking. The names are initially sorted by the scores at the end of the season.

Name	Country	Seeding revision 0 (Note: Seeding revision 0 was used for the seeding of the Championship League, British Open and the European Masters.)		Seeding revision 1 (Note: Seeding revision 1 was used for the seeding of the Northern Ireland Open)		Seeding revision 2 (Note: Seeding revision 2 was used for the seeding of the Scottish Open and the English Open)		Seeding revision 3 (Note: Seeding revision 3 was used for the seeding of the UK Championship and the German Masters.)		Seeding revision 4 (Note: Seeding revision 4 was used for the seeding of the Masters.)		Seeding revision 5 (Note: Seeding revision 5 was used for the seeding of the Snooker Shoot Out.)		Seeding revision 6 (Note: Seeding revision 6 was used for the seeding of the Welsh Open.)		Seeding revision 7 (Note: Seeding revision 7 was used for the seeding of the WST Classic.)		Seeding revision 8 (Note: Seeding revision 8 was used for the seeding of the World Championship.)		Seeding revision 9	
Ronnie O'Sullivan	England	1	1,036,000	1	1,041,000	1	1,034,000	1	1,007,000	1	1,025,500	1	1,000,000	1	984,500	1	923,000	1	866,000	1	886,000
Luca Brecel	Belgium	12	297,000	9	330,000	11	326,000	11	327,500	11	336,000	11	333,000	10	368,000	10	400,500	10	391,500	2	876,500
Mark Allen	Northern Ireland	14	286,500	14	291,500	10	327,500	9	401,500	5	645,000	5	642,000	5	659,500	3	771,000	3	790,500	3	860,500
Judd Trump	England	2	1,009,500	2	1,011,500	2	943,000	3	853,000	3	788,000	2	789,000	4	700,000	5	670,500	5	606,000	4	556,000
Mark Selby	England	3	914,500	3	916,500	4	828,500	4	828,500	2	804,000	3	745,000	2	805,000	2	779,500	2	849,500	5	549,500
Neil Robertson	Australia	4	902,000	4	902,000	3	861,000	2	873,500	4	673,500	4	691,000	3	708,500	4	709,000	6	562,000	6	542,000
Shaun Murphy	England	9	316,000	10	322,000	13	309,000	13	307,500	12	326,000	12	325,000	11	332,500	6	501,500	4	645,500	7	445,500
Kyren Wilson	England	8	419,000	8	421,000	6	483,000	7	450,500	8	441,000	7	442,000	8	434,000	7	448,500	7	497,000	8	427,000
John Higgins	Scotland	5	537,000	5	537,000	5	520,000	5	506,000	6	489,000	6	490,500	6	490,500	11	367,500	11	378,500	9	398,500
Mark Williams	Wales	7	423,500	7	428,500	8	446,000	6	454,000	7	442,000	8	442,000	7	453,000	8	441,500	8	411,000	10	391,000
Zhao Xintong	China	6	434,500	6	443,500	7	450,000	8	431,500	9	425,000	9	425,000	9	417,000	9	411,000	9	402,500	11	387,500
Ali Carter	England	20	170,500	20	174,500	21	189,000	23	168,000	24	175,500	23	177,000	23	188,000	12	319,500	12	330,000	12	310,000
Robert Milkins	England	27	142,500	27	147,500	28	152,000	27	152,500	28	148,000	29	148,500	31	145,500	16	256,500	14	270,500	13	285,500
Jack Lisowski	England	10	315,500	11	316,500	12	323,000	12	322,000	10	347,500	10	352,000	12	316,500	13	308,500	13	279,000	14	279,000
Gary Wilson	England	33	123,000	33	129,000	31	131,000	31	130,000	32	130,000	18	210,000	17	213,000	17	234,000	16	250,000	15	260,000
Ryan Day	Wales	28	142,500	28	144,500	16	246,000	16	237,000	15	252,000	15	256,500	15	264,000	18	228,500	18	240,500	16	245,500
Ding Junhui	China	32	128,500	34	128,500	36	115,000	38	108,000	19	201,500	21	196,000	22	193,000	24	203,500	17	243,500	17	243,500
Hossein Vafaei	Iran	17	202,000	17	208,000	18	200,500	20	203,000	18	206,000	17	210,500	19	201,000	22	208,500	23	209,000	18	239,000
Anthony McGill	Scotland	16	202,500	18	202,500	20	195,000	17	209,500	20	192,500	20	200,000	21	197,000	21	211,500	21	212,000	19	212,000
Barry Hawkins	England	11	309,000	12	311,000	9	339,500	10	335,000	13	318,000	13	315,000	13	315,000	14	269,500	20	221,500	20	206,500
David Gilbert	England	19	195,000	19	199,000	19	198,000	19	205,000	17	208,500	19	208,500	18	211,500	20	213,000	22	211,500	21	201,500
Ricky Walden	England	18	198,000	16	209,000	17	210,500	18	209,500	21	192,500	22	193,500	20	198,000	23	206,500	24	198,000	22	198,000
Yan Bingtao	China	15	253,000	15	253,000	15	251,500	15	244,000	16	237,500	16	242,000	16	234,500	19	227,000	19	227,000	23	197,000
Tom Ford	England	30	137,500	30	139,500	32	129,500	32	129,000	22	179,000	24	176,000	24	176,000	25	200,000	25	195,000	24	195,000
Stuart Bingham	England	13	296,000	13	305,000	14	303,500	14	299,500	14	302,500	14	295,000	14	287,500	15	267,500	15	261,000	25	191,000
Jimmy Robertson	England	25	150,000	25	155,000	24	160,500	24	164,000	25	164,000	26	168,500	26	168,500	26	170,500	27	166,000	26	176,000
Zhou Yuelong	China	23	164,000	22	166,000	23	162,500	21	185,500	26	160,500	27	164,000	27	164,000	27	170,000	26	167,500	27	167,500
Joe Perry	England	26	148,500	26	149,500	29	149,500	30	141,500	30	142,000	31	146,500	30	146,500	30	151,500	31	145,500	28	165,500
Noppon Saengkham	Thailand	37	105,500	38	107,500	33	127,500	33	123,000	33	124,000	32	123,000	33	123,000	32	139,000	32	144,000	29	164,000
Matthew Selt	England	21	164,500	23	165,500	25	159,500	26	153,500	27	157,000	28	154,000	28	158,500	29	157,500	29	152,500	30	152,500
Chris Wakelin	England	43	90,000	43	95,000	42	96,500	41	94,500	45	88,000	46	85,000	47	85,000	28	158,500	28	154,500	31	149,500
Stephen Maguire	Scotland	24	151,500	24	157,500	26	153,500	25	156,000	29	144,000	30	148,500	29	148,500	36	127,500	33	130,500	32	145,500
Joe O'Connor	England	47	85,500	51	86,500	50	83,500	50	81,500	55	74,500	40	106,500	39	109,500	31	148,500	30	151,000	33	141,000
Fan Zhengyi	China	36	113,000	37	113,000	37	113,000	37	114,000	36	114,000	37	114,000	36	117,000	37	122,500	36	123,000	34	138,000
Pang Junxu	China	53	80,000	48	88,000	54	82,000	48	86,500	59	69,500	57	72,500	53	77,000	46	94,000	35	123,500	35	133,500
Si Jiahui	China		0	97	2,000	87	13,000	86	16,000	85	21,000	86	21,000	88	21,000	83	28,500	80	33,000	36	133,000
Jak Jones	Wales	41	97,500	41	99,500	44	94,500	44	91,500	46	87,000	48	84,000	50	84,000	50	87,500	52	87,000	37	127,000
Jordan Brown	Northern Ireland	22	164,000	21	168,000	22	173,000	22	173,500	23	177,000	25	174,000	25	174,000	43	97,000	44	96,000	38	111,000
Anthony Hamilton	England	50	84,500	46	89,500	40	100,500	39	100,500	39	108,000	39	108,000	40	108,000	40	105,000	42	104,500	39	109,500
Thepchaiya Un-Nooh	Thailand	52	80,000	53	82,000	53	82,000	59	71,500	57	70,000	47	84,500	44	92,000	45	95,500	45	94,500	40	109,500
Graeme Dott	Scotland	35	117,000	35	117,000	34	125,000	35	119,000	38	109,500	38	112,500	38	112,500	39	108,500	40	108,500	41	108,500
Cao Yupeng	China	65	59,000	65	60,000	65	65,000	63	65,000	58	70,000	56	73,000	54	76,000	51	86,000	48	90,500	42	105,500
Xiao Guodong	China	38	104,000	36	115,000	35	121,500	34	121,000	35	114,000	33	121,500	34	121,500	33	137,500	37	119,000	43	104,000
Matthew Stevens	Wales	56	77,000	56	77,000	59	76,500	60	70,500	49	80,500	50	80,500	51	80,500	54	84,000	54	84,500	44	99,500
Jamie Jones	Wales	31	129,500	32	135,500	27	152,500	28	150,500	31	133,500	34	121,000	32	128,500	35	128,000	34	128,000	45	98,000
Ben Woollaston	England	42	91,500	42	96,500	45	94,000	46	89,500	44	89,500	45	89,500	42	92,500	47	93,500	53	85,500	46	95,500
Lyu Haotian	China	45	87,000	44	95,000	38	106,000	36	115,000	34	118,500	36	114,000	37	114,000	38	117,000	38	115,500	47	95,500
Jackson Page	Wales	66	54,500	66	55,500	67	60,000	66	63,000	65	63,000	65	63,000	66	63,000	61	69,500	56	77,000	48	92,000
Elliot Slessor	England	60	70,500	58	74,500	57	77,500	54	75,500	64	63,500	64	63,500	62	68,000	59	72,000	60	71,500	49	91,500
Robbie Williams	England	61	70,500	61	72,500	55	79,500	52	77,500	51	78,500	55	74,000	57	74,000	53	84,500	49	90,000	50	90,000
Wu Yize	China	69	38,500	69	40,500	68	51,500	69	51,500	67	59,000	67	59,000	65	63,500	64	66,500	62	69,500	51	89,500
Yuan Sijun	China	68	42,000	67	48,000	66	63,000	67	63,000	60	68,000	60	68,000	59	72,500	52	85,500	50	88,500	52	88,500
Sam Craigie	England	44	89,500	45	90,500	47	90,500	47	88,500	37	113,500	35	117,000	35	120,000	34	129,000	39	108,500	53	88,500
Scott Donaldson	Scotland	46	86,000	50	87,000	48	88,500	55	75,500	53	75,500	51	80,000	48	84,500	55	83,500	51	87,500	54	87,500
Tian Pengfei	China	63	66,500	63	68,500	62	71,500	56	74,000	54	75,000	52	75,500	52	78,500	41	103,500	41	104,500	55	84,500
David Grace	England	55	78,500	55	80,500	49	84,000	62	66,500	68	54,500	68	54,500	68	54,500	69	55,500	66	62,500	56	82,500
Liam Highfield	England	39	103,500	39	103,500	43	96,500	42	94,500	41	98,000	42	97,000	41	100,000	42	100,000	43	101,000	57	81,000
Jamie Clarke	Wales	49	84,500	47	88,500	51	83,500	49	82,500	43	91,000	44	92,500	43	92,500	44	95,500	47	93,500	58	78,500
Andy Hicks	England	67	44,000	68	46,000	69	49,000	68	52,000	66	59,500	66	59,500	67	59,500	63	67,000	64	67,000	59	77,000
Zhang Anda	China	70	34,500	70	35,500	70	41,500	70	41,500	70	46,500	70	51,000	69	54,000	68	58,500	68	61,500	60	76,500
Oliver Lines	England	57	73,000	59	73,000	61	73,000	58	72,000	62	65,500	61	65,500	61	68,500	65	65,500	61	69,500	61	74,500
Martin Gould	England	29	138,500	31	138,500	39	103,500	43	93,000	42	93,000	43	96,000	45	91,000	48	93,000	46	94,000	62	74,000
Dominic Dale	Wales	59	70,500	60	72,500	58	77,000	57	72,000	56	73,000	58	70,000	58	73,000	56	80,500	59	73,500	63	73,500
Mark King	England	51	81,500	52	82,500	52	82,500	51	80,500	48	81,500	49	81,500	49	84,500	57	77,000	57	77,000	64	67,000
Lu Ning	China	34	119,000	29	142,000	30	144,000	29	142,000	40	102,000	41	98,000	46	90,500	49	90,500	55	81,500	65	66,500
Xu Si	China	76	23,000	74	24,000	73	29,000	73	29,000	72	39,000	72	42,000	72	45,000	72	46,000	71	50,500	66	65,500
Mark Joyce	England	58	73,000	57	75,000	56	79,500	53	77,500	52	76,000	53	75,000	55	75,000	58	73,500	58	75,000	67	65,000
Mark Davis	England	54	80,000	54	82,000	60	74,000	64	65,000	63	65,000	63	65,000	63	68,000	66	65,000	67	62,000	68	57,000
Hammad Miah	England	71	28,500	71	30,500	72	33,500	71	38,000	71	43,000	71	46,000	71	49,000	70	52,000	70	55,000	69	55,000
Stuart Carrington	England	64	65,500	64	65,500	63	70,000	61	67,000	61	65,500	59	68,500	60	71,500	62	68,000	69	58,000	70	48,000
Li Hang	China	48	85,500	49	87,500	46	93,500	40	97,000	47	85,000	62	65,000	64	65,000	67	65,000	65	63,000	71	48,000
Liang Wenbo	China	40	101,000	40	101,000	41	97,000	45	91,000	50	79,000	54	75,000	56	75,000	60	70,000	63	68,000	72	48,000
Peter Lines	England	73	24,500	73	24,500	74	27,500	74	27,500	74	32,500	74	32,500	74	35,500	75	35,500	76	35,500	73	45,500
Ian Burns	England	85	13,000	85	14,000	81	20,000	82	20,000	77	27,500	78	27,500	78	29,000	80	32,000	81	32,000	74	42,000
Jimmy White	England	90	6,000	91	6,000	90	9,000	89	12,000	83	22,000	85	22,000	87	22,000	79	32,500	73	40,000	75	40,000
Mitchell Mann	England	72	27,000	72	28,000	71	34,000	72	34,000	73	34,000	73	37,000	73	37,000	73	40,000	74	40,000	76	40,000
Louis Heathcote	England	78	20,000	79	20,000	82	20,000	80	23,000	82	23,000	84	23,000	84	26,000	74	37,000	75	37,000	77	37,000
Michael White	Wales		0	90	6,000	89	9,000	85	16,500	84	21,500	81	24,500	80	27,500	76	34,500	77	34,500	78	34,500
Ashley Hugill	England		0	108	1,000	104	4,000	106	4,000	100	9,000	98	12,000	85	23,000	88	23,500	89	23,500	79	33,500
Julien Leclercq	Belgium		0	116	0	120	0	108	3,000	112	3,000	115	3,000	109	6,000	77	33,500	78	33,500	80	33,500
Lei Peifan	China	77	22,500	77	22,500	77	25,500	78	25,500	76	30,500	76	30,500	75	33,500	78	33,500	79	33,500	81	33,500
David Lilley	England		0	98	2,000	108	2,000	99	6,500	95	11,500	92	14,500	94	14,500	89	23,000	90	23,000	82	33,000
John Astley	England		0	100	2,000	99	5,000	94	9,500	94	12,000	91	15,000	86	22,500	90	23,000	91	23,000	83	33,000
Barry Pinches	England	83	13,500	83	14,500	84	17,500	84	17,500	88	17,500	88	17,500	91	17,500	91	21,000	92	21,000	84	31,000
Duane Jones	Wales	75	23,000	76	23,000	79	23,000	81	23,000	75	30,500	75	30,500	76	30,500	81	30,500	82	30,500	85	30,500
Andrew Pagett	Wales	82	13,500	84	14,500	86	14,500	88	14,500	89	17,000	89	17,000	92	17,000	94	17,000	93	20,000	86	30,000
Alexander Ursenbacher	Switzerland	62	68,000	62	70,000	64	69,000	65	64,000	69	52,000	69	52,000	70	52,000	71	51,000	72	45,000	87	30,000
Chang Bingyu	China	81	15,000	80	19,000	75	27,000	75	27,000	78	27,000	77	30,000	77	30,000	82	30,000	83	30,000	88	30,000
Fraser Patrick	Scotland	84	13,500	82	15,500	83	18,500	83	18,500	86	21,000	83	24,000	79	28,500	84	28,500	84	28,500	89	28,500
Craig Steadman	England	80	16,500	81	16,500	80	21,500	79	24,500	81	24,500	82	24,500	81	27,500	85	27,500	85	27,500	90	27,500
James Cahill	England		0	105	1,000	102	4,000	104	4,000	106	6,500	106	6,500	107	6,500	110	9,500	96	17,000	91	27,000
Gerard Greene	Northern Ireland	79	18,500	78	20,500	78	23,500	77	26,500	80	26,500	80	26,500	83	26,500	86	27,000	86	27,000	92	27,000
Zhang Jiankang	China	74	24,000	75	24,000	76	27,000	76	27,000	79	27,000	79	27,000	82	27,000	87	27,000	87	27,000	93	27,000
Ben Mertens	Belgium		0	96	2,000	98	5,000	102	5,000	110	5,000	111	5,000	114	5,000	104	13,000	97	16,000	94	26,000
Aaron Hill	Ireland		0	92	4,000	95	7,000	90	11,500	96	11,500	99	11,500	100	11,500	95	16,000	98	16,000	95	26,000
Dylan Emery	Wales		0	104	1,000	93	7,000	91	10,000	92	12,500	90	15,500	89	18,500	92	19,500	94	19,500	96	24,500
Sanderson Lam	England		0	107	1,000	103	4,000	105	4,000	107	6,500	107	6,500	108	6,500	99	14,000	102	14,000	97	24,000
Alfie Burden	England	89	7,000	88	8,000	92	8,000	96	8,000	90	13,000	95	13,000	97	13,000	102	13,500	104	13,500	98	23,500
Ken Doherty	Ireland		0	106	1,000	112	1,000	115	1,000	121	1,000	113	4,000	106	7,000	101	13,500	106	13,500	99	23,500
Lukas Kleckers	Germany		0	112	0	96	6,000	100	6,000	102	8,500	103	8,500	104	8,500	105	12,500	88	23,500	100	23,500
Zak Surety	England		0	123	0	117	0	107	3,000	97	10,500	93	13,500	96	13,500	103	13,500	105	13,500	101	18,500
Michael Judge	Ireland	87	8,000	86	12,000	85	15,000	87	15,000	87	17,500	87	17,500	90	17,500	93	17,500	95	17,500	102	17,500
Dean Young	Scotland	88	7,000	89	7,000	88	10,000	93	10,000	93	12,500	97	12,500	99	12,500	96	16,000	99	16,000	103	16,000
Chen Zifan	China	92	3,000	93	4,000	94	7,000	92	10,000	98	10,000	94	13,000	93	16,000	97	16,000	100	16,000	104	16,000
Andy Lee	Hong Kong		0	126	0	105	3,000	97	7,500	91	12,500	96	12,500	98	12,500	98	15,500	101	15,500	105	15,500
Sean O'Sullivan	England		0	101	1,000	101	4,000	98	7,000	105	7,000	100	10,000	102	10,000	109	10,000	111	10,000	106	15,000
Jamie O'Neill	England	86	9,000	87	9,000	91	9,000	95	9,000	101	9,000	102	9,000	103	9,000	111	9,500	112	9,500	107	14,500
Allan Taylor	England		0	110	0	127	0	128	0	129	0	114	3,000	117	3,000	115	6,000	113	9,000	108	14,000
Marco Fu	Hong Kong	94	0	121	0	100	4,500	103	4,500	99	9,500	101	9,500	95	14,000	100	14,000	103	14,000	109	14,000
Muhammad Asif	Pakistan		0	114	0	129	0	130	0	114	2,500	118	2,500	110	5,500	112	8,500	107	11,500	110	11,500
Asjad Iqbal	Pakistan		0	113	0	130	0	127	0	109	5,000	110	5,000	113	5,000	116	6,000	116	6,000	111	11,000
Andres Petrov	Estonia		0	115	0	122	0	122	0	104	7,500	105	7,500	101	10,500	107	10,500	108	10,500	112	10,500
Rod Lawler	England		0	99	2,000	109	2,000	111	2,000	111	4,500	112	4,500	115	4,500	106	10,500	109	10,500	113	10,500
Dechawat Poomjaeng	Thailand		0	117	0	121	0	123	0	126	0	130	0	116	3,000	119	5,000	119	5,000	114	10,000
Peng Yisong	China		0	122	0	118	0	120	0	116	2,500	119	2,500	121	2,500	108	10,000	110	10,000	115	10,000
Adam Duffy	England		0	120	0	123	0	126	0	128	0	129	0	129	0	121	3,500	121	3,500	116	8,500
Ng On-yee	Hong Kong	91	3,000	94	3,000	97	6,000	101	6,000	103	8,500	104	8,500	105	8,500	113	8,500	114	8,500	117	8,500
Ryan Thomerson	Australia		0	103	1,000	110	1,000	113	1,000	119	1,000	121	1,000	122	1,000	114	7,000	115	7,000	118	7,000
Mohamed Ibrahim	Egypt		0	124	0	119	0	121	0	117	2,500	120	2,500	120	2,500	117	5,500	117	5,500	119	5,500
Oliver Brown	England		0	127	0	106	3,000	110	3,000	108	5,500	108	5,500	111	5,500	118	5,500	118	5,500	120	5,500
Anton Kazakov	Ukraine		0	128	0	113	0	116	0	122	0	123	0	127	0	130	0	127	0	121	5,000
Himanshu Jain	India		0	95	2,000	107	2,000	112	2,000	118	2,000	109	5,000	112	5,000	120	5,000	120	5,000	122	5,000
Fergal O'Brien	Ireland		0	118	0	124	0	124	0	115	2,500	117	2,500	119	2,500	122	3,500	122	3,500	123	3,500
Nutcharut Wongharuthai	Thailand		0	109	0	126	0	109	3,000	113	3,000	116	3,000	118	3,000	123	3,000	123	3,000	124	3,000
Jenson Kendrick	England		0	102	1,000	111	1,000	114	1,000	120	1,000	122	1,000	123	1,000	124	1,000	124	1,000	125	1,000
Reanne Evans	England	93	0	129	0	114	0	117	0	123	0	124	0	124	0	125	500	125	500	126	500
Victor Sarkis	Brazil		0	111	0	128	0	129	0	130	0	127	0	130	0	126	500	126	500	127	500
Rebecca Kenna	England		0	130	0	115	0	118	0	124	0	125	0	125	0	128	0	128	0	128	0
Stephen Hendry	Scotland		0	119	0	125	0	125	0	127	0	128	0	128	0	127	0	130	0	129	0
Bai Langning	China		0	131	0	116	0	119	0	125	0	126	0	126	0	129	0	129	0	130	0
Igor Figueiredo (Note: Igor Figueiredo's WPBSA membership has lapsed.)	Brazil	95	0	125	0																

== Ranking points ==
Preceded by 2021/2022	2022/2023 points	Succeeded by 2023/2024

Below is a list of points awarded to each player for the events they participated in. Grey fields indicate that the player did not participate at the event.

No.	Ch	Player	Season		Tournament															Season	Total
No.	Ch	Player	20/21	21/22	CL	EUM	BO	NIO	UK	SCO	ENO	WGP	SSO	GM	WEO	PC	WSTC	TC	WC	22/23	Total
1	Steady	(England) Ronnie O'Sullivan	0	772500	5000		0	3000	25000	4500	4500	7500			11000		3000		50000	113500	886000
2	▲10	(Belgium) Luca Brecel	0	245500	33000	3000	0	7500	15000	0	35000	7500	0	7500	7500	15000	0		500000	631000	876500
3	▲11	(Northern Ireland) Mark Allen	0	210000	5000	0	45000	80000	250000	4500	17500	100000	0	3000	11000	10000	4500	20000	100000	650500	860500
4	▼2	(England) Judd Trump	0	436000	2000	11000	8000	3000	15000	11000	11000	40000		0	4500	10000	4500		0	120000	556000
5	▼2	(England) Mark Selby	0	94000	2000	0	12000	11000	0	11000	80000	5000	0	0	4500	10000	80000	40000	200000	455500	549500
6	▼2	(Australia) Neil Robertson	0	441000				17500	0	17500	17500	5000		7500	3000		3000		30000	101000	542000
7	▲2	(England) Shaun Murphy	0	55500	6000	7500	0	4500	25000	3000	7500	20000	500	3000	35000	125000	3000	150000	0	390000	445500
8	Steady	(England) Kyren Wilson	0	158000	2000	80000	3000	4500	15000	11000	4500	7500	0	11000	3000	30000	7500	60000	30000	269000	427000
9	▼4	(Scotland) John Higgins	0	307500		0	3000	4500	0	4500	7500			3000	7500		11000		50000	91000	398500
10	▼3	(Wales) Mark Williams	0	286500	5000	17500	3000	11000	0	7500	11000	12500	1000	0	3000		3000		30000	104500	391000
11	▼5	(China) Zhao Xintong	0	361500	9000	4500	5000	0	0	3000	4500									26000	387500
12	▲8	(England) Ali Carter	0	86500	4000	17500	0	0	7500	4500	11000	5000	2000	80000	4500	50000	17500	20000	0	223500	310000
13	▲14	(England) Robert Milkins	0	78000	5000	7500	0	7500	7500	4500	4500	5000	500	17500	80000	15000	3000	20000	30000	207500	285500
14	▼4	(England) Jack Lisowski	0	121000	1000	4500	8000	0	50000	7500	4500	12500	2000	17500	7500	10000	3000		30000	158000	279000
15	▲18	(England) Gary Wilson	0	90000	6000	4500	5000	0	0	80000	3000	5000	1000	3000	0	15000	17500		30000	170000	260000
16	▲12	(Wales) Ryan Day	0	46500	2000	7500	100000	0	15000	4500	7500	7500	0	0	0	15000	0	20000	20000	199000	245500
17	▲15	(China) Ding Junhui	0	63000			5000	3000	100000	4500	4500	7500	0	3000	3000	10000	0	40000	0	180500	243500
18	▼1	(Iran) Hossein Vafaei	0	150000	6000	3000	0	4500	15000	7500	3000	5000	0	3000	7500		4500		30000	89000	239000
19	▼3	(Scotland) Anthony McGill	0	102000		3000	3000	17500	0	7500	4500	12500		4500	4500		3000		50000	110000	212000
20	▼9	(England) Barry Hawkins	0	117500	2000	35000	5000	4500	0	4500	7500	5000	0	3000	4500		3000		15000	89000	206500
21	▼2	(England) David Gilbert	0	136500	4000	0	3000	11000	10000	0	3000	5000	0	0	4500		4500		20000	65000	201500
22	▼4	(England) Ricky Walden	0	131500	11000	4500	0	0	0	11000	4500	5000	0	7500	3000		0		20000	66500	198000
23	▼8	(China) Yan Bingtao	0	175500		7500	5000	4500	0	4500										21500	197000
24	▲6	(England) Tom Ford	0	81500	2000	0	0	7500	50000	0	0	5000	4000	35000	0	10000	0		0	113500	195000
25	▼12	(England) Stuart Bingham	0	110500	9000	4500	3000	3000	15000	0	0	5000	0	0	0		11000		30000	80500	191000
26	▼1	(England) Jimmy Robertson	0	124500	5000	4500	5000	4500	0	4500	0		500	7500	0		0		20000	51500	176000
27	▼4	(China) Zhou Yuelong	0	58500	2000	7500	3000	35000	15000	7500	0	7500	2000	0	0	10000	4500		15000	109000	167500
28	▼2	(England) Joe Perry	0	91000	1000	0	3000	3000	25000	4500	0	5000	1000	4500	4500		3000		20000	74500	165500
29	▲8	(Thailand) Noppon Saengkham	0	79000	2000	0	20000	3000	7500	3000	0	20000	2000	0	0		7500		20000	85000	164000
30	▼9	(England) Matthew Selt	0	108000	1000	0	0	3000	10000	0	4500		0	0	3000		3000		20000	44500	152500
31	▲12	(England) Chris Wakelin	0	48000	5000	4500	0	0	0	0	0		50000	11000	3000	10000	3000		15000	101500	149500
32	▼8	(Scotland) Stephen Maguire	0	106500	6000	0	0	7500	0	4500	0		0	0	3000		3000		15000	39000	145500
33	▲14	(England) Joe O'Connor	0	36000	1000	0	5000	0	5000	35000	3000	7500	0	4500	11000	30000	3000		0	105000	141000
34	▲2	(China) Fan Zhengyi	0	103500		0	0	3000	0	0	3000		1000	4500	0		3000		20000	34500	138000
35	▲18	(China) Pang Junxu	0	30000	8000	0	0	4500	0	3000	4500		0	11000	17500		35000		20000	103500	133500
36	New entry	(China) Si Jiahui			2000	11000	0	3000	5000	0	0		0	4500	3000		4500		100000	133000	133000
37	▲4	(Wales) Jak Jones	0	44000	2000	3000	5000	0	7500	0	0		2000	3000	7500		3000		50000	83000	127000
38	▼16	(Northern Ireland) Jordan Brown	0	63000	4000	3000	8000	4500	10000	0	0		500	0	3000		0		15000	48000	111000
39	▲11	(England) Anthony Hamilton	0	66500	5000	3000	8000		7500	0	0		0	0	0		4500		15000	43000	109500
40	▲12	(Thailand) Thepchaiya Un-Nooh	0	48000	2000	0	3000	3000	5000	17500	7500	5000	500	0	0		3000		15000	61500	109500
41	▼6	(Scotland) Graeme Dott	0	69000	0	3000	8000	0	7500	3000	0			0	3000		0		15000	39500	108500
42	▲23	(China) Cao Yupeng		59000	1000	0	5000	0	5000	3000	3000		1000	4500	4500		4500		15000	46500	105500
43	▼5	(China) Xiao Guodong	0	34500	11000	4500	5000	7500	10000	7500	0	12500	500	11000	0		0		0	69500	104000
44	▲12	(Wales) Matthew Stevens	0	50000	0	3000	8000	0	10000	3000	0		0	4500	3000		3000		15000	49500	99500
45	▼14	(Wales) Jamie Jones	0	44000	6000	11000	12000	0	0	7500	7500	5000	500	0	0		4500		0	54000	98000
46	▼4	(England) Ben Woollaston	0	53500	5000	0	8000	3000	0	3000	3000		1000	3000	3000		3000		10000	42000	95500
47	▼2	(China) Lyu Haotian	0	39000	8000	3000	12000	11000	10000	3000	0	5000	0	0	0		4500		0	56500	95500
48	▲18	(Wales) Jackson Page		54500	1000	4500	0	3000	0	0	0		500	3000	3000		7500		15000	37500	92000
49	▲11	(England) Elliot Slessor	0	43000	4000	0	3000	3000	0	0	4500		500	7500	3000		3000		20000	48500	91500
50	▲11	(England) Robbie Williams	0	34000	2000	0	20000	0	7500	3000	0	5000	500	3000	7500		7500		0	56000	90000
51	▲18	(China) Wu Yize		38500	2000	11000	0	0	7500	0	4500		0	0	3000		3000		20000	51000	89500
52	▲16	(China) Yuan Sijun		42000	6000	3000	12000	0	5000	0	4500		2000	0	11000		3000		0	46500	88500
53	▼9	(England) Sam Craigie	0	33500	1000	0	0	3000	25000	7500	3000	7500	500	4500	3000		0		0	55000	88500
54	▼8	(Scotland) Scott Donaldson	0	44500	1000	4500	0	3000	0	4500	4500			3000	0		7500		15000	43000	87500
55	▲8	(China) Tian Pengfei	0	27500	2000	0	3000	7500	7500	4500	3000		0	7500	17500		4500		0	57000	84500
56	▼1	(England) David Grace	0	33000	2000	7500	3000	4500	0	0	0		2000	3000	0		7500		20000	49500	82500
57	▼18	(England) Liam Highfield	0	55000	0	0	0	0	10000	3000	3000		4000	3000	0		3000		0	26000	81000
58	▼9	(Wales) Jamie Clarke	0	41500	4000	0	3000	3000	15000	4500	0		0	3000	0		4500		0	37000	78500
59	▲8	(England) Andy Hicks		44000	2000	3000	0	3000	7500	0	0		0	3000	4500		0		10000	33000	77000
60	▲10	(China) Zhang Anda		34500	1000	3000	3000	0	5000	4500	3000		0	4500	0		3000		15000	42000	76500
61	▼4	(England) Oliver Lines	0	47500	0	3000	0	0	0	0	3000		0	0	0		11000		10000	27000	74500
62	▼33	(England) Martin Gould	0	49000		0	0	3000	0	3000	7500		1000	3000	3000		4500		0	25000	74000
63	▼4	(Wales) Dominic Dale	0	31000	2000	4500	0	3000	7500	0	3000		8000	0	4500		0		10000	42500	73500
64	▼13	(England) Mark King	0	49500	1000	0	0	3000	7500	3000	3000		0	0	0					17500	67000
65	▼31	(China) Lu Ning	0	35500	23000	0	5000	3000	0	0				0						31000	66500
66	▲10	(China) Xu Si		23000	1000	0	5000	0	10000	3000	3000		1000	0	0		4500		15000	42500	65500
67	▼9	(England) Mark Joyce	0	31500	2000	4500	3000	0	5000	3000	0		0	0	3000		3000		10000	33500	65000
68	▼14	(England) Mark Davis	0	30000	2000	0	0	0	0	0	3000		1000	3000	0		3000		15000	27000	57000
69	▲2	(England) Hammad Miah		28500	2000	0	3000	4500	5000	3000	3000		0	0	3000		3000		0	26500	55000
70	▼6	(England) Stuart Carrington	0	25000	0	4500	0	0	5000	3000	3000		0	0	4500		3000		0	23000	48000
71	▼23	(China) Li Hang	0	32500	2000	3000	3000	7500	0	0	0									15500	48000
72	▼32	(China) Liang Wenbo	0	48000			0	0			0									0	48000
73	Steady	(England) Peter Lines		24500	0	0	3000	0	5000		3000		0	0	0		0		10000	21000	45500
74	▲11	(England) Ian Burns		13000	1000	3000	3000	0	7500	0	1500		0	3000	0		0		10000	29000	42000
75	▲15	(England) Jimmy White		6000	0	3000	0	3000	10000	0	0		0	7500	3000		7500		0	34000	40000
76	▼4	(England) Mitchell Mann		27000	1000	3000	3000	0	0	3000	0		0	0	3000		0		0	13000	40000
77	▲1	(England) Louis Heathcote		20000	0	0	0	3000	0	0	3000		500	7500	3000		0		0	17000	37000
78	New entry	(Wales) Michael White			6000	3000	0	7500	5000	3000	3000		4000	3000	0		0		0	34500	34500
79	New entry	(England) Ashley Hugill			1000	3000	0	0	5000	3000	11000		500	0	0		0		10000	33500	33500
80	New entry	(Belgium) Julien Leclercq			0	0	0	3000	0	0	3000		20000	3000	4500		0		0	33500	33500
81	▼4	(China) Lei Peifan		22500	0	3000	0	0	5000	0	3000		0	0	0		0		0	11000	33500
82	New entry	(England) David Lilley			2000	0	0	4500	5000	3000	0		1000	3000	4500		0		10000	33000	33000
83	New entry	(England) John Astley			2000	0	3000	4500	2500	3000	7500		500	0	0		0		10000	33000	33000
84	▼1	(England) Barry Pinches		13500	1000	3000	0	0	0	0	0		500	3000	0		0		10000	17500	31000
85	▼10	(Wales) Duane Jones		23000	0	0	0	0	7500	0	0		0	0	0		0		0	7500	30500
86	▼4	(Wales) Andrew Pagett		13500	1000	0	0	0	2500	0	0		0	0	0		3000		10000	16500	30000
87	▼25	(Switzerland) Alexander Ursenbacher	0	18000	2000	0	3000	3000	0	0	0		1000	3000	0		0		0	12000	30000
88	▼7	(China) Chang Bingyu		15000	4000	3000	5000	0	0	3000	0			0						15000	30000
89	▼5	(Scotland) Fraser Patrick		13500	2000	0	3000	0	2500	3000	4500								0	15000	28500
90	▼10	(England) Craig Steadman		16500	0	0	5000	3000	0	0	3000		0	0	0		0		0	11000	27500
91	New entry	(England) James Cahill			1000	3000	0	0	2500	0	0		0	3000	0		7500		10000	27000	27000
92	▼13	(Northern Ireland) Gerard Greene		18500	2000	0	3000	3000	0	0	0		500	0	0		0		0	8500	27000
93	▼19	(China) Zhang Jiankang		24000	0	0	3000	0	0	0	0			0						3000	27000
94	New entry	(Belgium) Ben Mertens			2000	0	3000	0	0	0	0		500	0	7500		3000		10000	26000	26000
95	New entry	(Republic of Ireland) Aaron Hill			4000	3000	0	4500	0	0	0		0	0	4500		0		10000	26000	26000
96	New entry	(Wales) Dylan Emery			1000	3000	3000	3000	2500	3000	3000		1000	0	0		0		5000	24500	24500
97	New entry	(England) Sanderson Lam			1000	3000	0	0	2500	0	0		0	3000	4500		0		10000	24000	24000
98	▼9	(England) Alfie Burden		7000	1000	0	0	0	5000	0	0		500	0	0		0		10000	16500	23500
99	New entry	(Republic of Ireland) Ken Doherty			1000	0	0	0	0	3000	3000		500	3000	3000				10000	23500	23500
100	New entry	(Germany) Lukas Kleckers			0	3000	3000	0	2500	0	0		1000	3000	0		11000		0	23500	23500
101	New entry	(England) Zak Surety			0	0	0	3000	7500	3000	0		0	0	0		0		5000	18500	18500
102	▼15	(Republic of Ireland) Michael Judge		8000	4000	3000	0	0	2500	0	0		0	0	0		0		0	9500	17500
103	▼15	(Scotland) Dean Young		7000		0	3000	0	2500	0	0		500	0	3000		0		0	9000	16000
104	▼12	(China) Chen Zifan		3000	1000	0	3000	3000	0	3000	3000			0						13000	16000
105	New entry	(Hong Kong) Andy Lee			0	0	3000	4500	5000	0	0		0	0	3000		0		0	15500	15500
106	New entry	(England) Sean O'Sullivan			1000	3000	0	3000	0	3000	0		0	0	0		0		5000	15000	15000
107	▼21	(England) Jamie O'Neill		9000			0	0	0	0	0		500	0	0		0		5000	5500	14500
108	New entry	(England) Allan Taylor			0		0	0	0	3000	0		0	3000	0		3000		5000	14000	14000
109	▼15	(Hong Kong) Marco Fu		0	0	4500	0	0	5000		4500			0	0		0		0	14000	14000
110	New entry	(Pakistan) Muhammad Asif							2500	0	3000		0	3000	0		3000		0	11500	11500
111	New entry	(Pakistan) Asjad Iqbal							5000	0	0		1000	0	0		0		5000	11000	11000
112	New entry	(Estonia) Andres Petrov			0	0	0	0	7500	0	3000		0	0	0		0		0	10500	10500
113	New entry	(England) Rod Lawler			2000	0	0	0	2500	0	0		0	1500	4500					10500	10500
114	New entry	(Thailand) Dechawat Poomjaeng							0		3000		2000	0	0		0		5000	10000	10000
115	New entry	(China) Peng Yisong			0	0	0	0	2500	0	0		0	4500	3000		0		0	10000	10000
116	New entry	(England) Adam Duffy			0	0	0	0	0	0	0		500	3000	0		0		5000	8500	8500
117	▼26	(Hong Kong) Ng On-yee		3000	0	0	3000	0	2500	0	0		0	0	0		0		0	5500	8500
118	New entry	(Australia) Ryan Thomerson			1000	0	0	0	0	0	0		0	3000	3000		0		0	7000	7000
119	New entry	(Egypt) Mohamed Ibrahim							2500		0		0	0	3000		0		0	5500	5500
120	New entry	(England) Oliver Brown			0	3000	0	0	2500	0	0		0	0	0		0		0	5500	5500
121	New entry	(Ukraine) Anton Kazakov			0	0	0	0	0	0	0		0	0	0		0		5000	5000	5000
122	New entry	(India) Himanshu Jain			2000		0	0	0	3000	0		0	0	0		0		0	5000	5000
123	New entry	(Republic of Ireland) Fergal O'Brien			0		0	0	2500	0	0		1000	0	0		0		0	3500	3500
124	New entry	(Thailand) Nutcharut Wongharuthai			0	0	0	3000	0	0	0		0	0	0		0		0	3000	3000
125	New entry	(England) Jenson Kendrick			1000	0	0	0	0	0	0		0	0	0		0		0	1000	1000
126	▼33	(England) Reanne Evans		0	0	0	0	0	0	0	0		500	0	0		0		0	500	500
127	New entry	(Brazil) Victor Sarkis							0	0	0		500	0	0		0		0	500	500
128	New entry	(England) Rebecca Kenna				0	0	0	0	0	0		0	0	0		0		0	0	0
129	New entry	(Scotland) Stephen Hendry				0	0							0					0	0	0
130	New entry	(China) Bai Langning					0		0	0	0			0						0	0
