= 2022 Masters (snooker) =

2022 Cazoo Masters

Tournament information
- Dates: 9–16 January 2022
- Venue: Alexandra Palace
- City: London
- Country: England
- Organisation: World Snooker Tour
- Format: Non-ranking event
- Total prize fund: £725,000
- Winner's share: £250,000
- Highest break: Stuart Bingham (ENG) (139)

Final
- Champion: Neil Robertson (AUS)
- Runner-up: Barry Hawkins (ENG)
- Score: 10–4

The 2022 Masters (officially the 2022 Cazoo Masters) was a professional non-ranking snooker tournament that took place from 9 to 16 January 2022 at Alexandra Palace in London, England. It was the 48th staging of the Masters tournament, which was first held in 1975, and the second of three Triple Crown events in the 2021–22 snooker season, following the 2021 UK Championship and preceding the 2022 World Snooker Championship. Broadcast by the BBC and Eurosport in Europe, it was sponsored for the first time by car retailer Cazoo.

The participants were invited to the tournament based on the world rankings as they stood after the UK Championship. Some players took issue with the cut-off date, noting that the in-form Luca Brecel, who had entered the top 16 by winning the 2021 Scottish Open in December, did not qualify as the event took place after the UK Championship. Ding Junhui, who had made 15 consecutive Masters appearances between 2007 and 2021, fell out of the top 16 after the UK Championship and failed to qualify. Zhao Xintong, who entered the top 16 for the first time by winning the UK Championship, was the only Masters debutant. John Higgins set a new record of 28 Masters appearances, surpassing Jimmy White and Steve Davis, both of whom had competed 27 times.

Yan Bingtao was the defending champion, having defeated Higgins 10–8 in the previous year's final. However, Yan lost 4–6 to Mark Williams in the first round. Neil Robertson defeated Barry Hawkins 10–4 in the final to win his second Masters title and his sixth Triple Crown title. He became the tenth player to win the Masters more than once. There were 26 century breaks, with the highest being a 139 made by Stuart Bingham in his first-round loss to Kyren Wilson.

== Overview ==
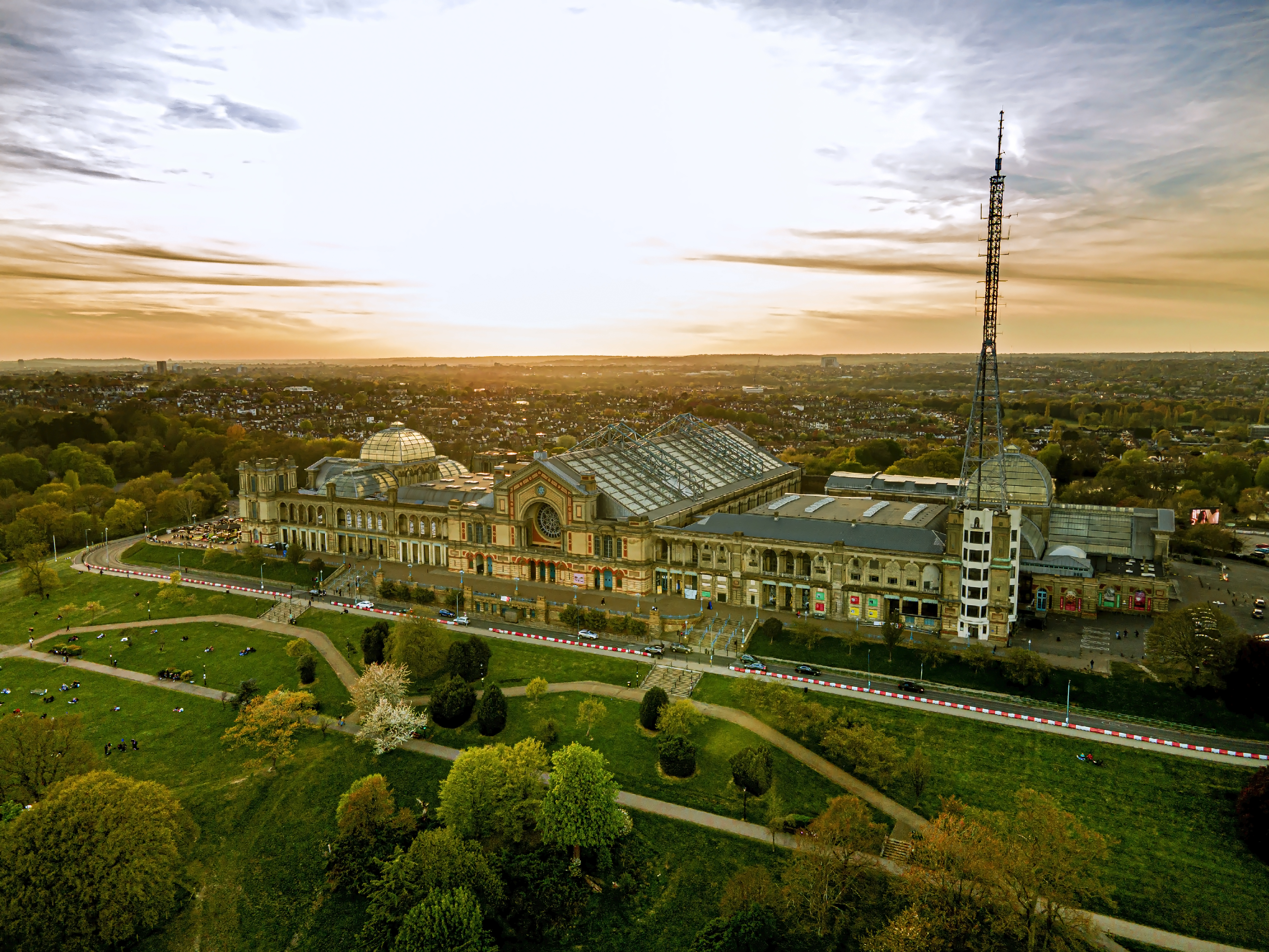
The event was held at the Alexandra Palace in London, England (pictured).

The Masters is an invitational snooker tournament first held in 1975. Organised by the World Snooker Tour, the 2022 Masters was the 48th staging of the tournament. It was the second Triple Crown event of the 2021–22 snooker season, following the 2021 UK Championship and preceding the 2022 World Snooker Championship. Held between 9 and 16 January 2022, the event returned to the Alexandra Palace in London, after the 2021 event was held at the Marshall Arena in Milton Keynes to facilitate compliance with COVID-19 regulations. Matches were played as the best-of-11 frames until the final, which was the best-of-19 frames played over two sessions. The event was sponsored for the first time by car retailer Cazoo, which replaced previous sponsor Betfred. The event's referees wore suits tailored by McCann Bespoke, as part of the London tailor's new partnership with the World Snooker Tour that is intended to restyle the appearance of referees and players.

The tournament was broadcast live in the United Kingdom by BBC Sport, as well as by Eurosport in Europe. Worldwide, the event was covered by China Central Television and Superstars Online in China and Sky Sport in New Zealand. It was simulcast in Hong Kong by Now TV with additional commentary; DAZN covered the event across Canada, Brazil and the United States. In all other territories, the event was streamed by Matchroom Sport.

=== Participants ===
The event featured the 16 players who were placed highest in the world rankings after the UK Championship in December 2021. The defending champion was Yan Bingtao, who won the 2021 Masters with a 10–8 victory over John Higgins in the final. Yan was seeded first for the event as defending champion. The next seven players in the world rankings were seeded and allocated fixed positions in the draw, with the remaining eight participants drawn randomly against them.

Both Higgins and Ronnie O'Sullivan took issue with the cutoff date for Masters eligibility, noting that the in-form Luca Brecel did not qualify even though he had entered the top 16 one week after the UK Championship by winning the 2021 Scottish Open. Zhao Xintong, who entered the top 16 for the first time after winning the UK Championship, made his Masters debut, the only player to do so at the 2022 event. The 2011 champion Ding Junhui, who made 15 consecutive Masters appearances between 2007 and 2021, fell out of the top 16 after the UK Championship and failed to qualify for the first time since he was 18 years old in 2006. Higgins made a record 28th appearance at the event, surpassing both Jimmy White and Steve Davis, who had both played at the Masters 27 times.

=== Prize money ===
The winner of the event won £250,000 from a total prize pool of £725,000. The breakdown of prize money for the event is shown below:

- Winner: £250,000
- Runner-up: £100,000
- Semi-finals: £60,000
- Quarter-finals: £30,000
- Last 16: £15,000
- Highest break: £15,000
- Total: £725,000

== Summary ==
=== First round ===
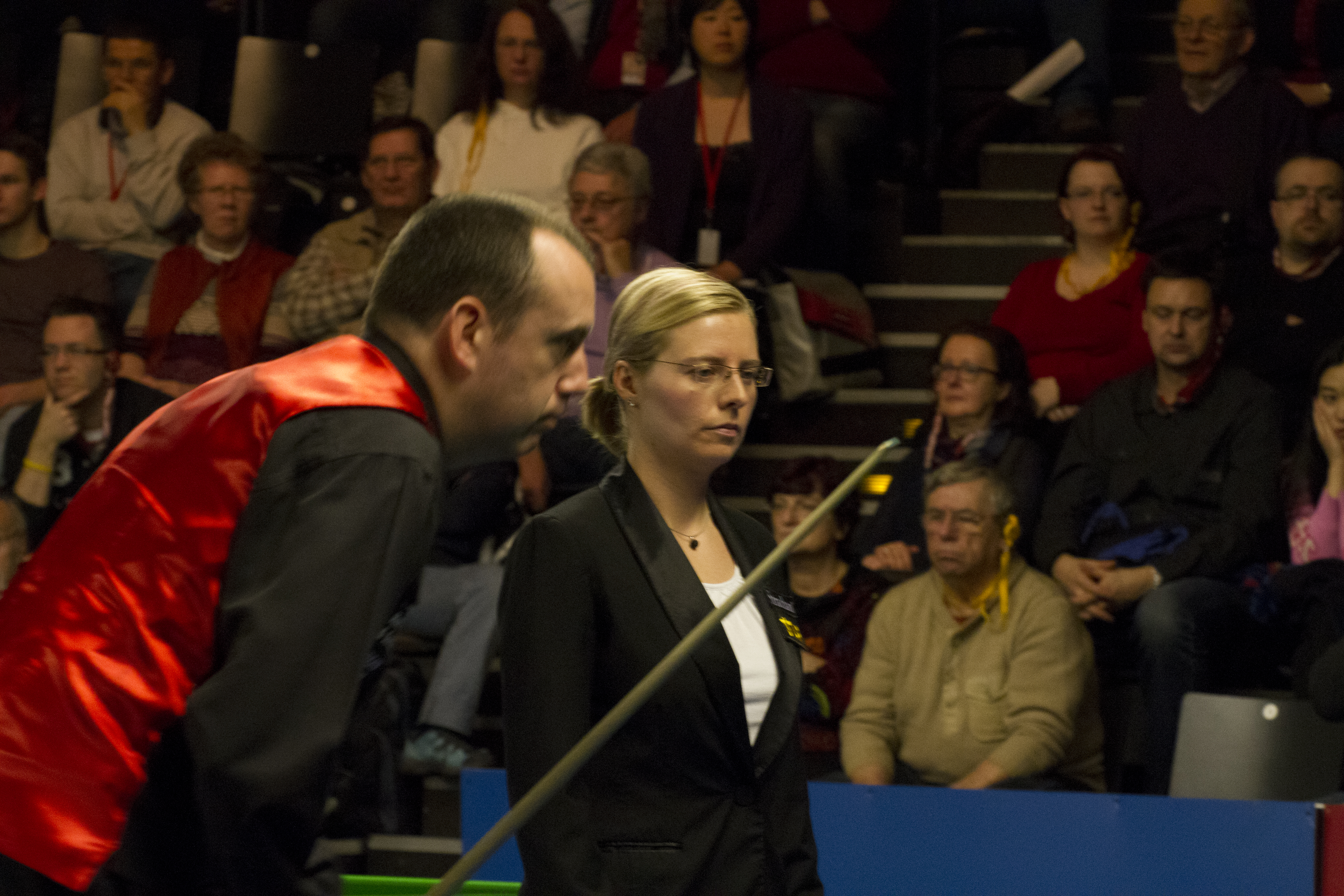
Mark Williams defeated the defending champion Yan Bingtao in the first round.

The first round was played between 9 and 12 January 2022 as the best-of-11 frames. In the opening afternoon's match, defending champion Yan faced two-time winner Mark Williams, who had lost in the first round in five of his six previous Masters appearances. Yan led 3–1 at the midsession interval, but Williams then won four consecutive frames to lead 5–3. Although Yan made a break of 122 to win the ninth frame, Williams clinched the match 6–4 with an 85 break in the tenth. During the evening session, the 2012 champion Neil Robertson, who had lost in the first round on his last two Masters appearances, played Anthony McGill. The match began with a 12-minute safety battle before the first pot was made. McGill played strongly at the outset, winning the first frame with a break of 78 and making a century in the third frame, but Robertson capitalised on his opponent's errors to win the second and fourth and then made a break of 95 in the fifth frame to lead 3–2. Although McGill tied the scores at 3–3 with a break of 75, Robertson won the next three frames to secure a 6–3 victory.

The following afternoon, two-time champion Higgins faced debutant Zhao. After Higgins had made a century break in the first frame, Zhao responded with a 128 total clearance in the second. Higgins then won three consecutive frames to lead 4–1, aided by another century break in the fifth frame. He closed out the match with a break of 78 to win 6–2. During the match, referee Jan Verhaas mistakenly spotted the green ball on the yellow spot. This was rectified after a member of the audience let Verhaas know. In the evening, 2015 champion Shaun Murphy faced Barry Hawkins. Murphy took a 2–1 lead but Hawkins then rallied to win five consecutive frames for a 6–2 victory. Hawkins's win meant that he had defeated Murphy in all three of their Masters encounters, even though their overall head-to-head record was 10–4 in favour of Murphy. Commentators noted that Murphy appeared to be suffering from neck, shoulder and back problems during the match, which Murphy had stated were limiting his ability to practice and compete in tournaments.

The next afternoon, seven-time champion O'Sullivan played Jack Lisowski, with O'Sullivan's friend Ronnie Wood watching from the VIP seats. After O'Sullivan won the first frame, Lisowski responded with a century break to win the second. In the third frame, Lisowski missed a thin cut on the green to a baulk corner pocket, allowing O'Sullivan to make a frame-winning break of 86. Lisowski later identified his missed green as a turning point in the match. O'Sullivan made another break of 63 to lead 3–1 at the midsession interval, after which he made a 127 clearance and further breaks of 64 and 125 to win the match 6–1. Lisowski's defeat meant that he had won just four frames in his three Masters appearances. In the evening, reigning world champion and three-time winner Mark Selby played Stephen Maguire. Selby won the 45-minute opening frame, and the players traded frames until the midsession interval, tying the scores at 2–2. The momentum shifted after the interval, with Selby winning four of the last five frames for a 6–3 victory.

The last two first-round matches both went to a deciding frame. The 2019 champion Judd Trump, who had missed the previous year's event after testing positive for COVID-19, played the 2018 champion Mark Allen. Both players scored heavily in the opening frames, with Trump making two 101 breaks and Allen a 92. The match was tied at 2–2 at the midsession interval. After play resumed, Trump took the lead with a break of 88, but Allen won the next two frames to go 4–3 in front and looked like extending his lead in frame eight, as Trump required a snooker with one red remaining. However, Allen failed to escape from a snooker and went in-off, allowing Trump to clear the table and level at 4–4. A 135 break in the ninth frame gave Trump the lead once more, but Allen won an error-filled tenth frame to force the decider. In the final frame, Allen was on a break of 23 before committing a foul as he bridged over the pack with the rest. Trump came from 25 points behind to win the match 6–5 with a break of 62.

Kyren Wilson faced the 2020 champion Stuart Bingham. Wilson won four of the first five frames to lead 4–1. In frame six, Wilson declared a foul on himself after feathering the cue ball, allowing Bingham to win the frame. Bingham also won the seventh frame, and then leveled the scores at 4–4 with the tournament's highest break of 139. Although Wilson won the ninth frame, Bingham responded with a 132 in the tenth to level again at 5–5. In the decider, Bingham missed a pot on the pink ball while on a break of 31, and the match was contested on a safety battle on the yellow ball. Wilson eventually potted the yellow and won the match 6–5.

=== Quarter-finals ===
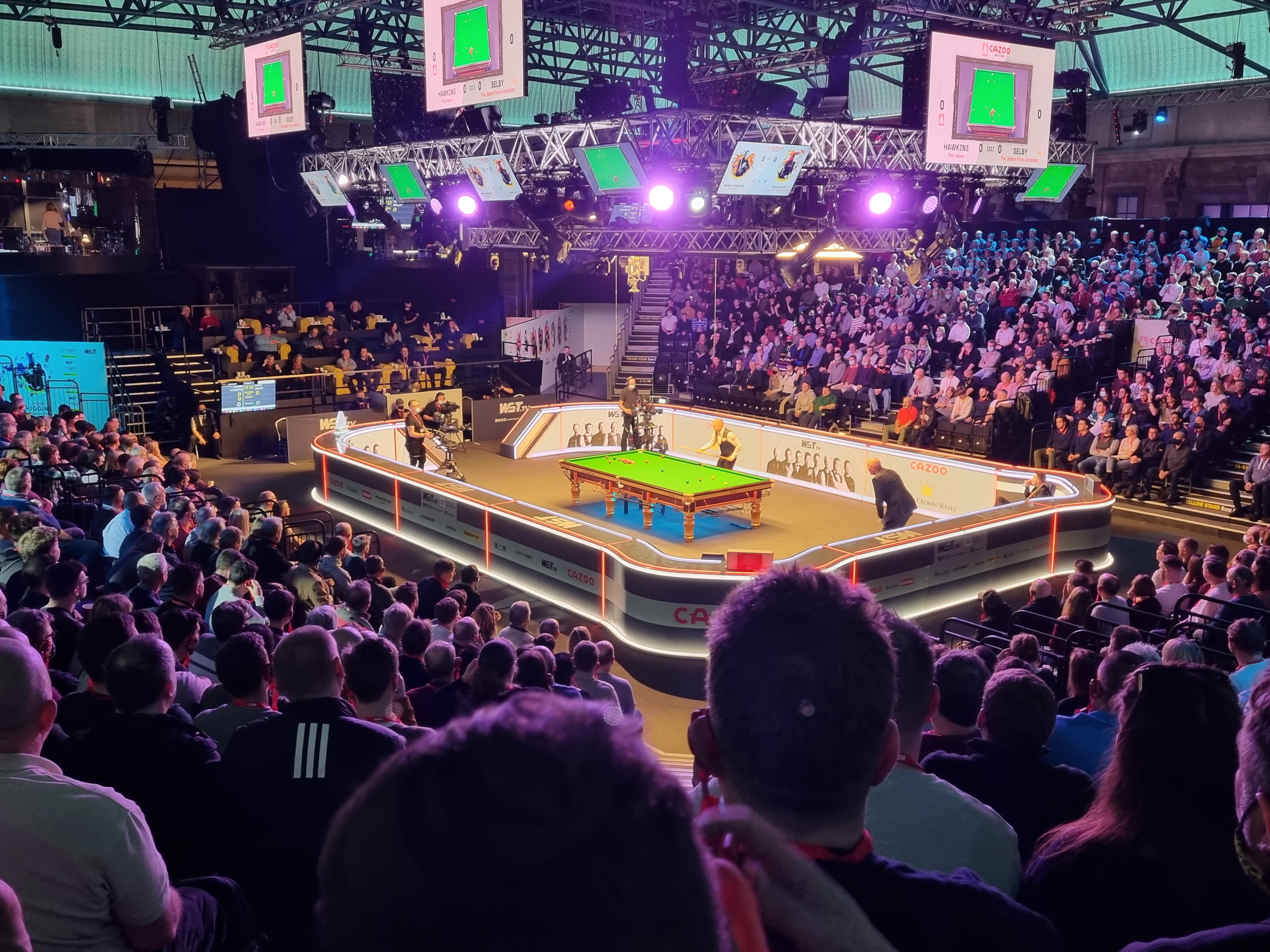
Barry Hawkins (pictured at the event) completed a 6–1 victory over Mark Selby.

The quarter-finals took place on 13 and 14 January as the best-of-11 frames. The quarter-finalists comprised six former champions — O'Sullivan, Williams, Higgins, Robertson, Trump and Selby (Note: For O'Sullivan, see "Ronnie O'Sullivan". WPBSA. Archived from the original on 15 January 2022.; for Williams, see "Mark Williams". WPBSA. Archived from the original on 17 January 2022.; For Higgins, see "John Higgins". WPBSA. Archived from the original on 2 February 2022.; For Robertson, see "Neil Robertson". WPBSA. Archived from the original on 2 February 2022.; For Trump, see "Judd Trump". WPBSA. Archived from the original on 2 February 2022.; For Selby, see "Mark Selby". WPBSA. Archived from the original on 16 May 2021.) — and two former runners-up — Hawkins, who lost to O'Sullivan in 2016, and Wilson, who lost to Allen in 2018. In the first quarter-final, Robertson began with 202 unanswered points against O'Sullivan, including a break of 119, to go 2–0 ahead. O'Sullivan then won the third and fourth frames to level at 2–2. Robertson won the fifth frame, before a 102 break by O'Sullivan, his 80th century break at the Masters. Robertson responded with a 130 break to win the seventh frame. A 68 break from O'Sullivan in the eighth frame tied the scores at 4–4 but Robertson then won two consecutive frames with breaks of 43, 49, and 54 to complete a 6–4 victory. Robertson noted the difficulty of competing at the Masters against O'Sullivan, commenting "[O'Sullivan] gets the crowd behind him and you get 2,000 people absolutely screaming," but stated that his Masters debut against Jimmy White had taught him how to respond in such a situation.

Higgins started his match against Williams with a 126 break in the first frame, and also won the second. Williams responded with three consecutive frames, including a 116 break in the third, to lead 3–2. Higgins leveled the match at 4–4 with a 127 break. On a break of 43 in the ninth frame, Higgins looked likely to take the lead, but he accidentally potted a red ball when playing a shot on the black, allowing Williams to win the frame with a 78 break. Higgins won the tenth frame, but Williams secured a 6–5 victory with a break of 91 to reach his first Masters semi-final since the 2010 event. Williams described the break he made in the deciding frame as "one of the best of my career".

Trump won the first two frames against Wilson with breaks of 68 and 74. Although Wilson won the third frame with a 71 break, he ran out of position in the fourth while on a break of 53, allowing Trump to make a frame-winning break of 50. Trump came from 45 points behind in the fifth frame to make a 76 and go 4–1 ahead. He won the sixth frame with a break of 67, and then closed out a 6–1 victory in the seventh frame. It was Trump's fifth consecutive victory over Wilson. Trump commented that he was "devastated to miss this last year so I was determined to enjoy it this time", whilst Wilson admitted that the "better player on the day won".

The final match of the quarter-finals saw Hawkins play Selby. Hawkins opened the match with a break of 58, and went to the midsession interval 3–1 ahead. Hawkins made a break of 65 in the next to lead by three frames. Hawkins also won frame six after Selby fouled and left a free ball, and won the match 6–1. Hawkins later commented that the scoreline "flattered him". Selby's highest break during the match was 49, and he described his performance as "pathetic". After the match, Selby commented that he had been struggling with mental health issues throughout the tournament. Fellow professional Gary Wilson praised Selby for speaking up about depression within the sport.

=== Semi-finals ===
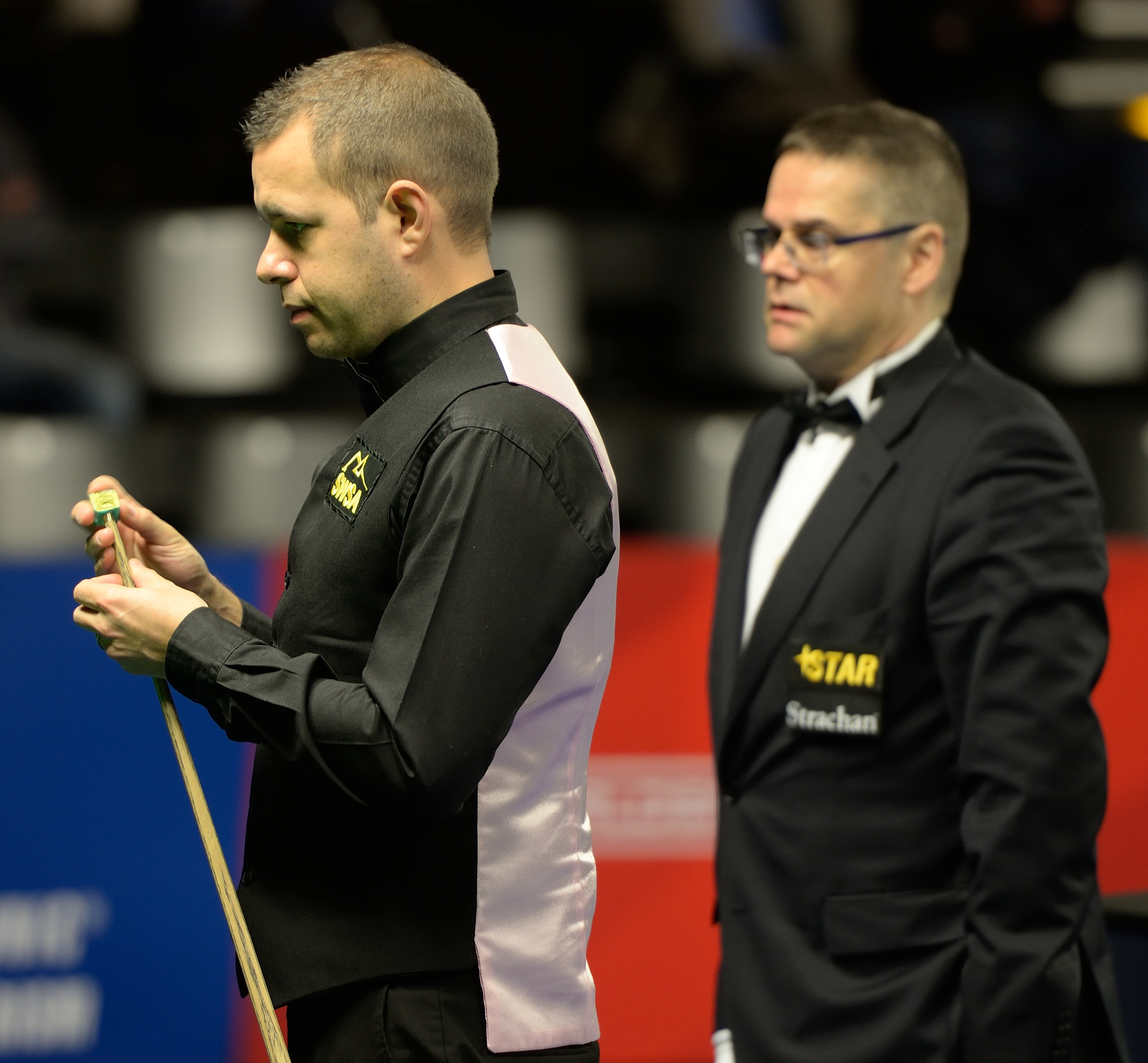
Barry Hawkins (pictured left, in 2015) reached the final of the event for the second time.

The semi-finals were played on 15 January as the best-of-11 frames. Robertson met Williams in the first semi-final. Robertson made a century break to win the opening frame, but he trailed 1–3 at the interval. Robertson, however, made breaks of 83, 95 and 119 to win four of the next six to force a deciding frame. Helped by a fluke, Williams led by 67 points to 26 in the decider with one red remaining on the table, meaning that Robertson required two snookers. After the black ball covered the pocket, with the last red close to the black, Robertson was able to obtain the first of the snookers he required. When playing the yellow ball, Williams misjudged a swerve shot, hitting the green ball and giving away another four foul points. Robertson then cleared the table to win the match 6–5. After the match, Robertson called the comeback "the greatest" of his career. The World Snooker Tour ranked the match as number one on its "Top Ten Matches of 2022" list.

Hawkins played Trump in the second semi-final. Hawkins won the opening frame after a prolonged safety battle, but Trump levelled the scores with a break of 86. Trump also won frame three with a 63 break before Hawkins won the next two frames to lead 3–2. After the fifth frame, the match was halted as one of the pockets had fallen apart. Hawkins made a 124 break in the sixth frame, his second century of the tournament, before Trump won the next two frames to tie the scores at 4–4. Trump made a break of 54 to lead for the first time in the match, but Hawkins won the tenth frame to force a decider, which he won with a break of 58. This was the twelfth meeting between the two players, with each having won six.

=== Final ===
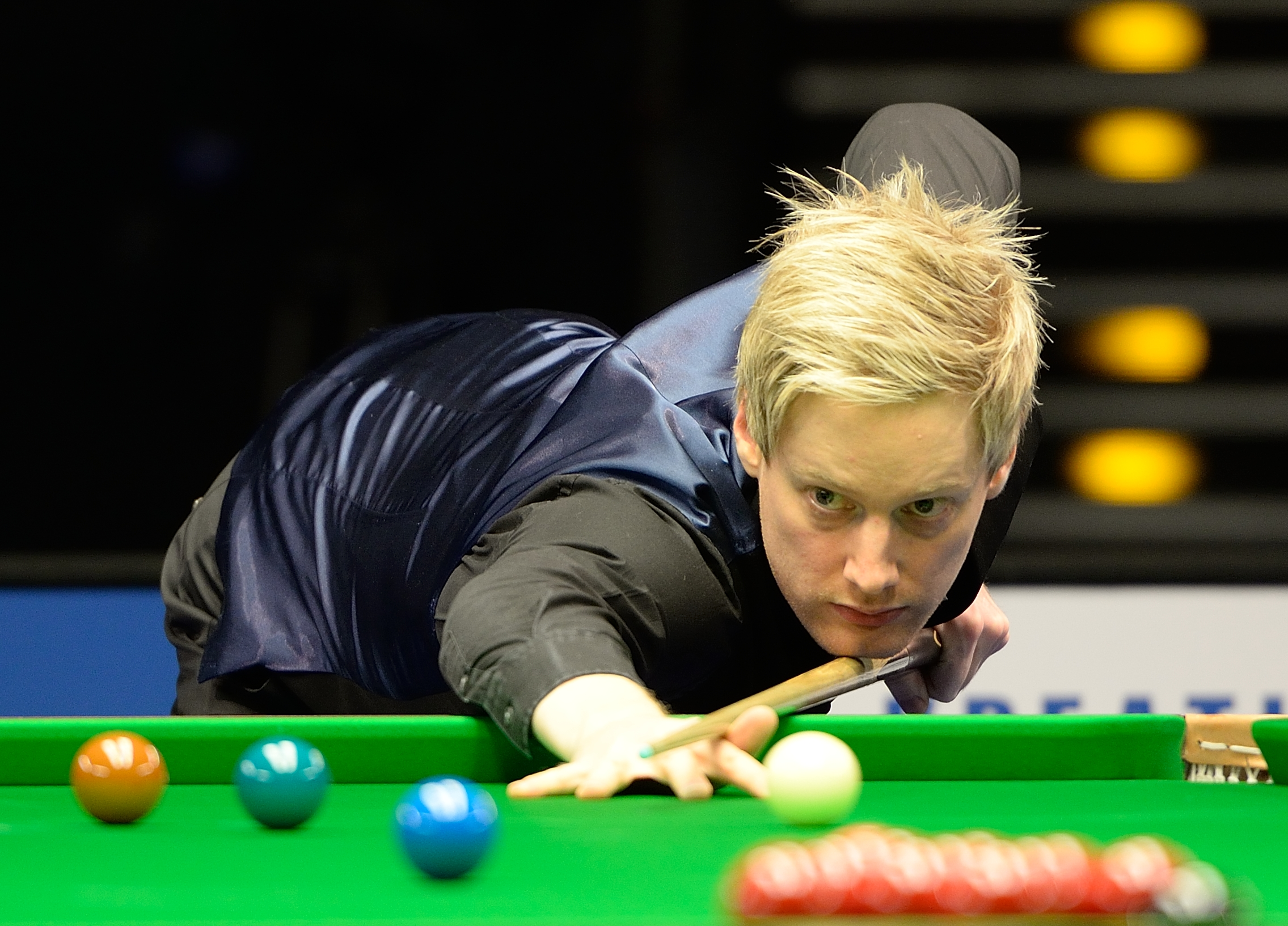
Neil Robertson won his second Masters title, defeating Barry Hawkins 10–4.

The final was played as the best-of-19 frames, held over two sessions on 16 January between Robertson and Hawkins. The match was officiated by Desislava Bozhilova, who took charge of her first Triple Crown final. Hawkins won the opening frame but Robertson responded with breaks of 50 and 105 to win the next two. Hawkins took the fourth, tying the scores at 2–2 at the midsession interval. A turning point came in the fifth frame when Hawkins, on a break of 60, missed the last red, which would have left Robertson requiring a snooker. Hawkins then fouled the green with his sleeve during a safety battle over the red, leaving a free ball that allowed Robertson to clear the table and win the frame. Robertson also won the sixth frame with two 54 breaks to go two frames ahead for the first time at 4–2. Hawkins won the seventh, but Robertson made a break of 73 in the eighth and final frame of the session to maintain his two-frame advantage at 5–3.

The first two frames of the evening session were shared, as Robertson won the ninth with a break of 50 and Hawkins responded with a 69 in the tenth, his highest break of the match. Robertson then won four consecutive frames to clinch a 10–4 victory and his second Masters title. He became the tenth player to win the tournament more than once, following Alex Higgins, Cliff Thorburn, Steve Davis, Stephen Hendry, Paul Hunter, Williams, O'Sullivan, John Higgins, and Selby. It was Robertson's sixth Triple Crown title, following his world title in 2010, his previous Masters victory in 2012, and his three UK Championship wins in 2013, 2015, and 2020. Robertson compiled two centuries and six other breaks of 50 or more in the final, while Hawkins made just two breaks over 50. Hawkins acknowledged that his performance in the final had been substandard, saying: "I made too many mistakes today and you can't do that against someone like Neil because he's a wonderful player." Hawkins's defeat meant that he had lost all three Triple Crown finals he had reached, having previously been runner-up to O'Sullivan in the 2013 World Snooker Championship and the 2016 Masters.

== Tournament draw ==
Numbers given on the left show the players' seedings in the tournament draw. Players in bold denote match winners.

**First round** Best of 11 frames
1	Yan Bingtao (CHN)	4
**9**	**Mark Williams (WAL)**	**6**
**8**	**John Higgins (SCO)**	**6**
10	Zhao Xintong (CHN)	2
**5**	**Neil Robertson (AUS)**	**6**
16	Anthony McGill (SCO)	3
**4**	**Ronnie O'Sullivan (ENG)**	**6**
14	Jack Lisowski (ENG)	1
**3**	**Judd Trump (ENG)**	**6**
12	Mark Allen (NIR)	5
**6**	**Kyren Wilson (ENG)**	**6**
15	Stuart Bingham (ENG)	5
7	Shaun Murphy (ENG)	2
**11**	**Barry Hawkins (ENG)**	**6**
**2**	**Mark Selby (ENG)**	**6**
13	Stephen Maguire (SCO)	3

**Quarter-finals**; Best of 11 frames
**9**	**(Wales) Mark Williams**	**6**
8	(Scotland) John Higgins	5
**5**	**(Australia) Neil Robertson**	**6**
4	(England) Ronnie O'Sullivan	4
**3**	**(England) Judd Trump**	**6**
6	(England) Kyren Wilson	1
**11**	**(England) Barry Hawkins**	**6**
2	(England) Mark Selby	1

**Semi-finals**; Best of 11 frames
9	(Wales) Mark Williams	5
**5**	**(Australia) Neil Robertson**	**6**
3	(England) Judd Trump	5
**11**	**(England) Barry Hawkins**	**6**

**Final**; Best of 19 frames
**5**	**(Australia) Neil Robertson**	**10**
11	(England) Barry Hawkins	4

=== Final ===
Final
Final: Best-of-19 frames. Referee: Desislava Bozhilova; Alexandra Palace, London, England, 16 January 2022.
**Neil Robertson** (5); Australia	**10**–4	Barry Hawkins (11); England
Afternoon: 30–**60**, **112**–7 (50), **105**–0 (105), 20–**65**, **77**–67 (Hawkins 60), **108**–16 (54, 54), 33–**67**, **73**–16 (73); Evening: **76**–4 (50), 14–**74** (69), **72**–0 (68), **62**–16, **114**–11 (114), **77**–0
**114**	Highest break	69
**2**	Century breaks	0
**8**	50+ breaks	2

== Century breaks ==
There were 26 century breaks made during the tournament. The highest was a 139 made by Bingham in his first round loss to Wilson.

- 139, 132 – Stuart Bingham
- 135, 101, 101 – Judd Trump
- 130, 119, 119, 114, 105, 102 – Neil Robertson
- 128 – Zhao Xintong
- 127, 126, 104, 100 – John Higgins
- 127, 125, 102 – Ronnie O'Sullivan
- 124, 103 – Barry Hawkins
- 122 – Yan Bingtao
- 116, 104 – Mark Williams
- 115 – Anthony McGill
- 104 – Jack Lisowski
