= 2021–22 snooker world rankings =

Preceded by 2020–21	2021–22	Succeeded by 2022–23

2021–22 snooker world rankings: The professional world rankings for all the professional snooker players who qualified for the 2021‍–‍22 season are listed below. The rankings work as a two-year rolling list. The points for each tournament two years ago are removed when the corresponding tournament during the current season finishes. The following table contains the rankings which were used to determine the seedings for certain tournaments. Note that the list given below are just those rankings that are used for seeding tournaments. Other rankings are produced after each ranking event which are not noted here.

Name	Country	Seeding revision 0 (Note: Seeding revision 0 was used for the seeding of the Championship League and the 2021 British Open.)		Seeding revision 1 (Note: Seeding revision 1 was used for the seeding of the 2021 Northern Ireland Open.)		Seeding revision 2 (Note: Seeding revision 2 was used for the seeding of the 2021 English Open, 2021 Scottish Open and 2022 German Masters.)		Seeding revision 3 (Note: Seeding revision 3 was used for the seeding of the 2022 European Masters.)		Seeding revision 4 (Note: Seeding revision 4 was used for the seeding of the 2021 UK Championship.)		Seeding revision 5 (Note: Seeding revision 5 was used for the seeding of the 2022 Masters.)		Seeding revision 6 (Note: Seeding revision 6 was used for the seeding of the 2022 Snooker Shoot Out.)		Seeding revision 7 (Note: Seeding revision 7 was used for the seeding of the 2022 Turkish Masters.)		Seeding revision 8 (Note: Seeding revision 8 was used for the seeding of the 2022 Welsh Open.)		Seeding revision 9 (Note: Seeding revision 9 was used for the seeding of the 2022 Gibraltar Open.)		Seeding revision 10 (Note: Seeding revision 10 was used for the seeding of the 2022 World Snooker Championship.)		Seeding revision 11	
Ronnie O'Sullivan	England	3	861,000	3	864,000	3	864,000	3	864,000	3	854,000	3	861,500	3	971,500	3	971,500	2	971,500	2	996,000	1	1,036,000	1	1,036,000
Judd Trump	England	1	1,370,000	1	1,376,000	2	1,206,000	1	1,199,000	2	989,000	2	989,000	2	994,000	2	994,000	3	924,000	3	825,500	4	859,500	2	1,009,500
Mark Selby	England	2	1,246,000	2	1,242,000	1	1,213,000	2	1,118,500	1	1,102,500	1	1,092,000	1	1,049,500	1	1,044,500	1	1,046,500	1	1,027,500	2	984,500	3	914,500
Neil Robertson	Australia	4	785,500	4	785,500	4	772,000	4	764,500	4	834,500	4	817,500	4	850,000	4	770,000	4	739,000	4	768,000	3	922,000	4	902,000
John Higgins	Scotland	7	418,000	7	420,000	7	411,500	6	428,500	7	406,000	7	393,500	6	421,000	6	415,000	6	411,000	6	396,500	6	467,000	5	537,000
Zhao Xintong	China	26	149,750	26	151,750	25	147,000	29	126,500	26	125,500	9	313,500	9	318,500	9	312,500	8	382,500	7	380,000	7	404,500	6	434,500
Mark Williams	Wales	11	314,000	11	305,250	8	400,500	11	330,000	9	330,000	8	330,000	8	335,000	8	351,000	9	350,000	8	356,000	8	373,500	7	423,500
Kyren Wilson	England	6	611,000	6	618,000	5	609,500	5	602,000	5	572,000	5	605,500	5	609,500	5	605,500	5	612,500	5	583,500	5	589,000	8	419,000
Shaun Murphy	England	5	643,500	5	649,500	6	574,500	7	427,000	6	413,000	6	413,000	7	408,500	7	406,000	7	391,000	10	296,000	10	316,000	9	316,000
Jack Lisowski	England	14	281,250	14	277,250	14	272,500	15	265,000	15	251,500	13	264,000	17	241,500	17	239,000	17	242,000	14	260,000	14	265,500	10	315,500
Barry Hawkins	England	13	292,750	12	296,750	12	292,000	14	267,500	14	256,000	10	289,500	10	294,500	11	284,000	11	287,000	9	341,000	9	339,000	11	309,000
Luca Brecel	Belgium	39	103,500	40	102,500	44	99,000	46	90,000	40	91,000	18	171,000	16	248,500	16	245,000	16	245,000	15	251,500	11	297,000	12	297,000
Stuart Bingham	England	15	281,000	13	287,000	13	281,500	12	286,000	13	265,000	14	260,000	12	280,000	13	278,000	14	275,000	12	274,000	12	276,000	13	296,000
Mark Allen	Northern Ireland	12	302,000	10	325,000	11	296,000	9	338,500	11	317,500	11	289,500	13	277,000	12	278,000	10	295,000	11	290,000	15	256,500	14	286,500
Yan Bingtao	China	10	314,000	15	270,000	15	261,500	13	274,000	12	271,000	16	238,000	15	250,500	15	246,500	13	278,500	17	225,500	16	233,000	15	253,000
Anthony McGill	Scotland	16	257,000	16	257,000	16	248,500	16	235,500	16	231,500	15	249,500	14	271,500	14	271,500	15	271,500	13	271,000	13	272,500	16	202,500
Hossein Vafaei	Iran	41	100,000	43	98,000	40	105,000	60	69,000	63	64,000	50	81,000	42	92,500	23	142,500	23	145,500	19	178,500	18	182,000	17	202,000
Ricky Walden	England	32	129,250	31	133,250	29	136,750	24	142,000	24	136,000	22	141,500	24	142,500	24	142,500	18	162,500	18	203,500	17	213,000	18	198,000
David Gilbert	England	23	162,500	19	195,500	18	194,000	21	154,000	22	138,000	20	155,000	21	150,000	20	150,500	21	154,500	20	175,000	19	175,000	19	195,000
Ali Carter	England	24	156,000	23	165,000	22	158,500	20	161,500	20	147,000	23	141,500	23	146,000	27	129,500	26	129,500	25	140,000	23	155,500	20	170,500
Matthew Selt	England	30	136,750	32	126,750	33	127,000	34	110,000	35	102,000	29	119,000	26	134,000	26	133,000	27	123,000	31	119,500	21	164,500	21	164,500
Jordan Brown	Northern Ireland	40	101,000	38	103,000	37	108,000	36	108,000	33	108,000	28	125,000	27	133,000	25	133,500	25	133,500	26	139,500	24	149,000	22	164,000
Zhou Yuelong	China	17	207,750	17	204,750	17	212,000	17	200,500	17	177,500	17	189,500	18	189,500	19	154,500	19	156,500	24	140,500	25	149,000	23	164,000
Stephen Maguire	Scotland	9	347,000	9	347,000	9	345,500	8	345,500	8	333,000	12	265,000	11	284,500	10	284,500	12	285,500	16	248,000	40	101,500	24	151,500
Jimmy Robertson	England	63	74,000	60	79,000	48	90,500	42	95,000	47	87,000	45	87,000	40	96,000	40	96,000	38	97,000	28	130,500	30	135,000	25	150,000
Joe Perry	England	20	187,500	20	186,500	21	173,000	22	149,000	30	115,500	32	110,000	33	105,500	35	105,500	36	101,500	23	146,000	26	148,500	26	148,500
Robert Milkins	England	37	109,500	37	109,500	41	101,000	38	104,000	34	104,000	34	104,000	36	101,000	38	97,000	43	93,000	44	89,000	27	142,500	27	142,500
Ryan Day	Wales	28	141,250	27	150,250	26	145,500	26	138,000	23	138,000	26	131,500	28	132,500	28	129,500	24	139,500	22	157,500	22	157,500	28	142,500
Martin Gould	England	25	151,250	25	152,250	23	150,500	23	146,000	19	150,000	21	150,000	19	161,000	18	158,000	20	155,000	21	159,000	20	168,500	29	138,500
Tom Ford	England	22	163,250	22	171,250	24	149,750	28	128,000	25	132,000	24	138,500	20	151,000	21	148,000	22	149,000	27	137,000	28	142,500	30	137,500
Jamie Jones	Wales	55	85,500	51	87,500	50	87,500	48	87,500	46	87,500	44	87,500	41	95,000	41	95,000	41	95,000	40	101,000	37	109,500	31	129,500
Ding Junhui	China	8	356,750	8	356,750	10	335,250	10	330,500	10	324,500	27	131,000	29	127,000	30	121,000	30	117,000	32	113,500	29	138,500	32	128,500
Gary Wilson	England	33	124,000	33	121,000	28	144,500	25	141,000	21	144,000	25	133,500	25	139,500	29	122,500	29	120,500	29	121,000	31	123,000	33	123,000
Lu Ning	China	35	116,250	36	114,250	34	126,250	30	122,500	28	121,500	31	115,000	31	111,000	33	107,000	32	110,000	33	112,500	33	119,000	34	119,000
Graeme Dott	Scotland	18	199,250	18	201,250	20	179,750	18	171,000	18	156,500	19	156,500	22	149,000	22	143,000	28	123,000	36	104,500	34	117,000	35	117,000
Fan Zhengyi	China	85	9,500	87	9,500	88	9,500	86	12,500	87	12,500	85	19,000	89	19,000	88	19,500	80	29,500	35	109,500	35	113,000	36	113,000
Noppon Saengkham	Thailand	44	97,500	41	102,500	39	105,500	40	95,500	45	87,500	42	92,500	37	100,500	36	100,500	37	100,500	38	103,500	38	109,500	37	105,500
Xiao Guodong	China	29	139,000	29	136,000	32	127,500	33	115,500	31	110,500	30	116,000	30	116,000	31	110,000	31	113,000	37	104,500	39	104,000	38	104,000
Liam Highfield	England	43	98,000	44	97,000	45	97,250	44	93,500	44	88,500	40	94,000	45	90,000	43	91,000	40	95,000	41	98,500	43	98,500	39	103,500
Liang Wenbo	China	27	142,500	28	142,500	30	132,000	27	135,000	27	124,000	37	99,500	34	103,500	32	107,500	33	108,500	30	120,500	32	121,000	40	101,000
Jak Jones	Wales	65	53,500	65	54,500	65	59,500	64	63,500	60	66,500	60	73,000	59	73,000	56	74,000	51	77,000	48	84,000	44	97,500	41	97,500
Ben Woollaston	England	46	96,250	45	95,250	52	86,750	53	82,000	53	77,000	48	82,000	44	91,500	45	88,500	44	88,500	45	88,000	45	91,500	42	91,500
Chris Wakelin	England	60	79,250	59	79,250	61	74,500	65	61,500	62	65,500	63	65,500	65	61,000	65	63,000	65	63,000	63	68,500	62	70,000	43	90,000
Sam Craigie	England	51	88,500	50	87,500	55	82,750	55	78,000	55	73,000	47	85,000	46	89,000	44	89,000	42	94,000	42	94,000	42	99,500	44	89,500
Lyu Haotian	China	53	86,250	58	83,250	54	83,250	50	86,000	51	81,000	57	74,500	57	74,500	61	70,500	56	74,500	66	63,500	64	67,000	45	87,000
Scott Donaldson	Scotland	34	121,750	34	119,750	35	114,250	35	109,500	32	108,500	35	102,000	39	99,500	46	88,500	48	83,500	49	80,500	49	81,000	46	86,000
Joe O'Connor	England	62	76,250	63	75,250	57	82,250	57	74,500	54	74,500	49	81,000	55	77,000	53	77,000	52	77,000	51	77,000	52	80,500	47	85,500
Li Hang	China	38	108,500	39	102,500	38	105,500	43	95,000	41	91,000	51	80,500	48	87,500	49	84,500	47	84,500	43	89,500	48	85,500	48	85,500
Jamie Clarke	Wales	67	43,000	67	44,000	67	44,000	67	44,000	67	51,500	67	51,500	67	51,500	67	55,500	67	58,500	65	64,500	66	64,500	49	84,500
Anthony Hamilton	England	54	85,750	54	85,750	47	90,750	52	83,000	56	72,000	55	77,000	47	87,500	47	88,000	45	88,000	46	86,000	46	89,500	50	84,500
Mark King	England	52	87,500	57	83,500	59	81,750	54	81,000	36	101,000	36	101,000	32	106,000	34	106,500	34	103,500	39	103,500	41	101,500	51	81,500
Thepchaiya Un-Nooh	Thailand	19	188,000	21	186,000	19	181,250	19	169,000	39	94,000	41	94,000	50	84,000	58	73,000	60	70,000	54	75,500	53	80,000	52	80,000
Pang Junxu	China	66	50,000	66	52,000	66	57,000	66	57,000	66	57,000	65	57,000	64	61,000	66	61,000	64	64,000	59	70,000	63	70,000	53	80,000
Mark Davis	England	49	91,000	46	95,000	49	89,500	47	89,500	48	86,000	59	74,000	58	74,000	57	74,000	57	74,000	52	76,500	54	80,000	54	80,000
David Grace	England	59	83,750	56	83,750	58	82,000	51	85,000	49	85,000	46	85,000	51	82,000	50	79,000	55	75,000	56	75,000	58	73,500	55	78,500
Matthew Stevens	Wales	36	109,750	35	114,750	36	110,000	37	106,500	37	98,500	58	74,000	61	71,000	60	71,000	59	71,000	60	69,500	55	77,000	56	77,000
Oliver Lines	England	72	25,500	69	31,500	69	36,500	69	40,500	69	43,500	68	43,500	68	46,500	68	48,500	68	48,500	69	48,500	67	63,000	57	73,000
Mark Joyce	England	42	98,750	62	76,750	63	72,000	63	64,500	65	63,500	56	75,500	56	75,500	55	76,000	53	76,000	53	76,000	60	73,000	58	73,000
Dominic Dale	Wales	61	77,250	61	78,250	60	81,250	59	72,500	59	67,500	52	79,500	53	79,500	54	76,500	58	73,500	64	65,500	65	65,500	59	70,500
Elliot Slessor	England	50	88,500	49	88,500	43	100,000	39	99,000	42	91,000	43	91,000	49	87,000	48	87,500	50	77,500	50	78,000	51	80,500	60	70,500
Robbie Williams	England	68	36,500	68	37,500	68	40,500	68	40,500	68	48,000	66	54,500	66	57,500	62	65,500	63	65,500	62	68,500	61	70,500	61	70,500
Alexander Ursenbacher	Switzerland	45	97,250	42	100,250	42	100,250	41	95,500	43	88,500	39	95,000	43	92,000	42	92,000	46	88,000	47	84,500	47	88,000	62	68,000
Tian Pengfei	China	58	83,750	55	83,750	53	83,750	58	73,000	57	72,000	61	72,000	62	69,000	63	65,500	66	61,500	67	57,000	68	56,500	63	66,500
Stuart Carrington	England	47	93,750	48	91,750	51	87,000	49	87,000	52	78,000	53	78,000	54	78,000	52	78,000	54	75,000	55	75,000	50	80,500	64	65,500
Michael Holt	England	31	136,000	30	135,000	31	130,250	31	121,500	38	98,500	38	98,500	35	101,500	39	96,500	39	96,500	68	49,500	69	52,000	65	62,000
Kurt Maflin	Norway	21	169,000	24	154,000	27	145,500	32	121,500	29	121,500	33	104,500	38	100,500	37	97,500	35	101,500	34	111,000	36	111,000	66	61,000
Martin O'Donnell	England	48	92,250	47	92,250	46	95,250	45	90,500	50	82,500	54	77,000	52	81,500	51	78,500	49	78,500	58	74,000	56	74,500	67	59,500
Cao Yupeng	China		0	88	8,000	86	11,000	85	14,000	83	17,000	75	29,000	74	34,000	74	34,500	72	37,500	71	43,500	70	49,000	68	59,000
Sunny Akani	Thailand	57	85,000	52	87,000	56	82,250	56	77,500	58	68,000	62	68,000	60	71,000	59	71,000	61	69,000	57	74,000	57	74,000	69	59,000
Ashley Hugill	England	81	13,500	79	17,500	79	20,500	80	20,500	81	20,500	79	27,000	80	27,000	80	27,000	81	27,000	81	33,000	77	38,500	70	58,500
Andrew Higginson	England	56	85,250	53	86,250	62	72,750	61	68,000	64	64,000	64	64,000	63	63,000	64	65,000	62	67,000	61	69,500	59	73,000	71	58,000
Jackson Page	Wales		0	99	2,000	110	2,000	91	9,500	93	9,500	98	9,500	95	13,500	95	14,000	96	14,000	96	17,000	90	24,500	72	54,500
Allan Taylor	England	77	15,500	78	17,500	75	22,500	75	25,500	73	28,500	76	28,500	76	31,500	76	32,500	75	35,500	74	38,500	80	38,500	73	53,500
Gao Yang	China	75	19,000	76	20,000	80	20,000	78	23,000	78	23,000	74	29,500	75	32,500	75	33,000	73	37,000	73	40,000	74	42,000	74	52,000
Simon Lichtenberg	Germany	71	26,500	72	28,500	72	28,500	71	29,500	72	31,500	72	31,500	78	31,500	78	32,000	78	35,000	80	35,000	79	38,500	75	48,500
Ashley Carty	England	70	27,000	71	29,000	71	29,000	70	33,000	70	36,000	70	36,000	71	36,000	71	36,000	69	39,000	70	46,000	71	46,000	76	46,000
Andy Hicks	England		0	109	0	106	3,000	99	6,000	102	6,000	73	30,500	72	35,500	72	35,500	76	35,500	75	38,500	72	44,000	77	44,000
Rory McLeod	Jamaica	78	15,500	77	17,500	78	20,500	77	23,500	76	26,500	80	26,500	81	26,500	81	26,500	82	26,500	82	29,500	83	32,500	78	42,500
Fergal O'Brien	Ireland	76	17,000	75	21,000	77	21,000	76	24,000	75	28,000	78	28,000	73	35,500	73	35,500	77	35,500	72	42,500	73	42,500	79	42,500
Yuan Sijun	China		0	100	2,000	111	2,000	103	5,000	103	5,000	104	5,000	106	5,000	106	5,500	106	8,500	93	18,500	86	27,000	80	42,000
Steven Hallworth	England	69	27,500	70	29,500	70	29,500	72	29,500	71	33,500	71	33,500	70	36,500	70	38,500	70	38,500	76	38,500	75	40,500	81	40,500
Nigel Bond	England	64	71,750	64	72,750	64	68,000	62	68,000	61	66,000	69	41,500	69	41,500	69	42,500	71	37,500	77	37,000	76	40,000	82	40,000
Lukas Kleckers	Germany	80	14,000	82	15,000	76	22,000	79	22,000	79	22,000	82	22,000	83	22,000	82	23,000	84	23,000	84	26,000	85	29,500	83	39,500
Wu Yize	China		0	116	0	107	3,000	111	3,000	101	6,000	87	18,000	86	21,000	86	21,000	83	24,000	83	28,000	82	33,500	84	38,500
Ken Doherty	Ireland	73	21,500	73	25,500	73	28,500	73	28,500	74	28,500	77	28,500	77	31,500	77	32,500	74	36,500	78	36,500	78	38,500	85	38,500
Zhao Jianbo	China	74	21,500	74	23,500	74	26,500	74	26,500	77	26,500	81	26,500	79	29,500	79	29,500	79	32,500	79	35,500	81	35,500	86	35,500
Zhang Anda	China		0	119	0	119	0	119	0	119	0	119	0	109	4,000	110	4,500	104	8,500	89	21,500	89	24,500	87	34,500
Ben Hancorn	England	84	10,000	86	10,000	84	15,000	84	15,000	86	15,000	91	15,000	88	19,000	89	19,000	86	22,000	86	25,000	84	30,000	88	30,000
Hammad Miah	England		0	117	0	91	7,000	90	10,000	92	10,000	88	16,500	87	20,500	87	20,500	89	20,500	87	23,500	92	23,500	89	28,500
Mitchell Mann	England		0	98	2,000	109	2,000	88	12,000	88	12,000	94	12,000	92	15,000	90	17,000	90	17,000	85	25,000	87	27,000	90	27,000
Lee Walker	Wales	86	9,500	84	10,500	83	15,500	82	18,500	82	18,500	86	18,500	84	21,500	84	21,500	87	21,500	90	21,500	93	21,500	91	26,500
Peter Devlin	England	82	13,500	81	15,500	82	15,500	81	18,500	80	21,500	84	21,500	85	21,500	85	21,500	88	21,500	91	21,500	94	21,500	92	26,500
Aaron Hill	Ireland	79	15,000	80	16,000	81	16,000	83	16,000	84	16,000	89	16,000	90	16,000	91	17,000	91	17,000	92	20,000	88	26,500	93	26,500
Peter Lines	England		0	92	5,000	95	5,000	100	5,000	106	5,000	83	22,200	82	22,000	83	22,500	85	22,500	88	22,500	91	24,500	94	24,500
Zhang Jiankang	China		0	105	1,000	90	8,000	96	8,000	98	8,000	102	8,000	103	8,000	103	8,000	102	11,000	102	14,000	104	14,000	95	24,000
Duane Jones	Wales		0	102	1,000	93	6,000	92	9,000	96	9,000	101	9,000	98	12,000	97	13,000	100	13,000	98	16,000	96	18,000	96	23,000
Xu Si	China		0	107	0	98	5,000	97	8,000	89	11,000	95	11,000	91	15,000	93	15,000	93	15,000	94	18,000	97	18,000	97	23,000
Lei Peifan	China		0	110	0	113	0	114	0	120	0	120	0	108	4,000	109	4,500	107	7,500	112	7,500	112	7,500	98	22,500
Farakh Ajaib	Pakistan	89	4,500	90	5,500	94	5,500	94	8,500	97	8,500	92	15,000	93	15,000	92	15,500	92	15,500	99	15,500	98	17,500	99	22,500
Jamie Wilson	England	83	12,000	83	12,000	85	12,000	87	12,000	85	15,000	90	15,000	94	15,000	94	15,000	95	15,000	101	15,000	99	17,000	100	22,000
Zak Surety	England	87	9,500	85	10,500	87	10,500	89	10,500	91	10,500	97	10,500	100	10,500	99	11,000	97	14,000	95	17,000	95	20,500	101	20,500
Louis Heathcote	England		0	97	2,000	97	5,000	93	9,000	95	9,000	100	9,000	101	9,000	101	9,000	103	9,000	105	12,000	101	15,000	102	20,000
Iulian Boiko	Ukraine	90	3,000	95	3,000	104	3,000	109	3,000	113	3,000	113	3,000	105	6,000	105	6,000	109	6,000	107	9,000	103	14,500	103	19,500
Gerard Greene	Northern Ireland		0	94	4,000	100	4,000	104	4,000	100	7,000	93	13,500	96	13,500	96	13,500	99	13,500	104	13,500	106	13,500	104	18,500
Craig Steadman	England		0	93	5,000	96	5,000	101	5,000	105	5,000	106	5,000	102	8,000	102	8,500	98	13,500	97	16,500	100	16,500	105	16,500
Chang Bingyu	China		0	89	6,000	92	6,000	98	6,000	94	9,000	99	9,000	97	12,000	98	12,000	94	15,000	100	15,000	102	15,000	106	15,000
Andrew Pagett	Wales		0	118	0	99	5,000	102	5,000	104	5,000	105	5,000	107	5,000	107	5,500	111	5,500	109	8,500	109	8,500	107	13,500
Barry Pinches	England		0	104	1,000	103	4,000	107	4,000	110	4,000	110	4,000	112	4,000	111	4,500	105	8,500	110	8,500	110	8,500	108	13,500
Fraser Patrick	Scotland		0	111	0	114	0	115	0	99	7,500	103	7,500	104	7,500	104	7,500	108	7,500	103	13,500	105	13,500	109	13,500
Ian Burns	England		0	101	1,000	101	4,000	105	4,000	108	4,000	108	4,000	113	4,000	108	5,000	112	5,000	111	8,000	111	8,000	110	13,000
Stephen Hendry	Scotland	88	5,000	91	5,000	89	8,000	95	8,000	90	11,000	96	11,000	99	11,000	100	11,000	101	11,000	106	11,000	107	11,000	111	11,000
Jamie O'Neill	England		0	112	0	115	0	116	0	111	3,000	111	3,000	115	3,000	115	3,000	110	6,000	108	9,000	108	9,000	112	9,000
Michael Judge	Ireland		0	121	0	121	0	121	0	118	0	118	0	114	3,000	114	3,000	115	3,000	117	3,000	117	3,000	113	8,000
Dean Young	Scotland		0	113	0	116	0	117	0	116	0	116	0	122	0	117	2,000	117	2,000	119	2,000	119	2,000	114	7,000
Alfie Burden	England		0	115	0	118	0	108	4,000	107	4,000	107	4,000	110	4,000	112	4,000	113	4,000	113	7,000	113	7,000	115	7,000
Jimmy White	England		0	103	1,000	102	4,000	106	4,000	109	4,000	109	4,000	111	4,000	113	4,000	114	4,000	115	4,000	114	6,000	116	6,000
Sean Maddocks	England	91	2,000	96	2,000	108	2,000	112	2,000	114	2,000	114	2,000	117	2,000	118	2,000	118	2,000	114	5,000	115	5,000	117	5,000
Ng On-yee	Hong Kong		0	122	0	122	0	122	0	117	0	117	0	118	0	119	0	119	0	116	3,000	116	3,000	118	3,000
Chen Zifan	China		0	108	0	105	3,000	110	3,000	112	3,000	112	3,000	116	3,000	116	3,000	116	3,000	118	3,000	118	3,000	119	3,000
Reanne Evans	England		0	114	0	117	0	118	0	115	0	115	0	121	0	120	0	120	0	120	0	120	0	120	0
Marco Fu	Hong Kong		0	120	0	120	0	120	0	122	0	122	0	120	0	122	0	121	0	122	0	121	0	121	0
Igor Figueiredo	Brazil		0	106	0	112	0	113	0	121	0	121	0	119	0	121	0	122	0	121	0	122	0	122	0
