= 2021–22 snooker world ranking points =

Preceded by 2020/2021	2021/2022	Succeeded by 2022/2023

The official 2021/2022 snooker world ranking points for the professional snooker players on the World Snooker Main Tour in the 2021–22 season are based on performances in ranking tournaments over a two-year rolling period. The rankings at the start of 2021/2022 season are determined by prize money earned in the 2019/2020 and 2020/2021 seasons and are updated after every tournament carrying ranking status; the players are re-ranked at the beginning of the current season after removing players relegated at the end of the previous season from the ranking list. As points are accrued from tournaments throughout the current season, the points from the corresponding tournaments from two seasons earlier are dropped. The rankings are used to set the official tournament seedings at various points throughout the season; even though the rankings are officially updated after every tournament carrying ranking status not all the rankings are used as seedings, and only the rankings officially used as seedings are documented below. The total points accumulated by the cut-off dates for the revised seedings are based on all the points up to that date in the 2021/2022 season, all of the points from the 2020/2021 season, and the points from the 2019/2020 season that have not yet been dropped.

== Seeding revisions ==
Cut-off point	Date	After	2019/2020 points dropped
1	14 August 2021	Championship League	Riga Masters
2	23 August 2021	British Open	International Championship
3	18 October 2021	Northern Ireland Open	China Championship; English Open
4	8 November 2021	English Open	World Open; Northern Ireland Open
5	6 December 2021	UK Championship	UK Championship
6	20 December 2021	World Grand Prix	Scottish Open
7	24 January 2022	Shoot Out	European Masters
8	31 January 2022	German Masters	German Masters
9	7 March 2022	Welsh Open	World Grand Prix; Welsh Open; Shoot Out; Players Championship
10	4 April 2022	Tour Championship	Gibraltar Open; Tour Championship
Total	3 May 2022	World Championship	World Championship

== Ranking points ==
No.	Ch (Note: "Ch" = Change since the beginning of the 2021/2022 season. See for the player rankings at the start of the season)	Player	Season (Note: The 2019/2020 points only include the ranking points that count towards the next seedings update. All new players or players regaining a place on the tour started on 0 points.)		Tournament (Note: Under World Snooker's rules players are not generally awarded points if they qualify for an event and then withdraw. However, World Snooker's appeals committee reserves the right to award points at their discretion and occasionally the finalised ranking list published after the tournament is inconsistent with the provisional list updated by the WPBSA during the tournament, in the event that discretionary points have been awarded. In such instances this table might include points not documented on the WPBSA's provisional list, which have been factored into the table so the overall totals and rankings match those on the finalised ranking list.)																Season	Cut-off point (Note: See for the rankings at the first seedings cut-off point; see for the second; see for the third; see for the fourth; see for the fifth; see for the sixth; see for the seventh; see for the eighth; see for the ninth; see for the tenth.)										Total
No.	Ch	Player	19/20	20/21	CL	BO	NIO	ENO	UK	SCO	WGP	SSO	GM	PC	EUM	WEO	TM	GO	TC	WC	21/22	1	2	3	4	5	6	7	8	9	10	Total
1	▲2	(England) Ronnie O'Sullivan	0	263500	3000		7500	20000	24500	20000	100000		0	15000	35000	7500		0	40000	500000	772500	864000	864000	864000	854000	861500	971500	971500	971500	996000	1036000	1036000
2	▼1	(England) Judd Trump	0	573500	6000	5000	10000	10000	12000	7500	7500		10000	10000	4000	30000	100000	4000	20000	200000	436000	1376000	1206000	1199000	989000	989000	994000	994000	924000	825500	859500	1009500
3	▼1	(England) Mark Selby	0	820500		3000	7500	7500	6500	7500	20000	1000	5000		3000	3000				30000	94000	1242000	1213000	1118500	1102500	1092000	1049500	1044500	1046500	1027500	984500	914500
4	Steady	(Australia) Neil Robertson	0	461000			4000	70000	0		40000		4000	125000	4000	10000		4000	150000	30000	441000	785500	772000	764500	834500	817500	850000	770000	739000	768000	922000	902000
5	▲2	(Scotland) John Higgins	0	229500	2000	5000	30000	30000	12000	30000	5000		0	15000	4000	4000	7500	3000	60000	100000	307500	420000	411500	428500	406000	393500	421000	415000	411000	396500	467000	537000
6	▲20	(China) Zhao Xintong	0	73000	2000	0	0	4000	200000	0	5000	0	80000	10000	0	3000	5500	2000	20000	30000	361500	151750	147000	126500	125500	313500	318500	312500	382500	380000	404500	434500
7	▲4	(Wales) Mark Williams	0	137000	2000	100000	7500		6500		5000	20000	4000	15000		3000	3500		20000	100000	286500	305250	400500	330000	330000	330000	335000	351000	350000	356000	373500	423500
8	▼2	(England) Kyren Wilson	0	261000	9000	0	4000	10000	40000	3000	5000		10000	10000	4000	7500	5500	20000		30000	158000	618000	609500	602000	572000	605500	609500	605500	612500	583500	589000	419000
9	▼4	(England) Shaun Murphy	0	260500	6000	0	10000	4000	0	3000		500	5000		3000	4000	20000			0	55500	649500	574500	427000	413000	413000	408500	406000	391000	296000	316000	316000
10	▲4	(England) Jack Lisowski	0	194500		0	4000	0	24500	0	7500	500	3000		3000	20000	5500	3000		50000	121000	277250	272500	265000	251500	264000	241500	239000	242000	260000	265500	315500
11	▲2	(England) Barry Hawkins	0	191500	4000	0	3000	4000	40000	0	5000	500	3000	50000	4000	4000	0	0		0	117500	296750	292000	267500	256000	289500	294500	284000	287000	341000	339000	309000
12	▲27	(Belgium) Luca Brecel	0	51500	1000	5000	4000	10000	80000	70000	7500	500	5000	10000	4000	0	5500	3000	40000	0	245500	102500	99000	90000	91000	171000	248500	245000	245000	251500	297000	297000
13	▲2	(England) Stuart Bingham	0	185500	6000	3000	7500	3000	12000	0	20000	1000	0		0	3000	0	5000		50000	110500	287000	281500	286000	265000	260000	280000	278000	275000	274000	276000	296000
14	▼2	(Northern Ireland) Mark Allen	0	76500	23000	3000	70000	0	12000	0	7500	4000	20000	10000	0	4000	3500	3000	20000	30000	210000	325000	296000	338500	317500	289500	277000	278000	295000	290000	256500	286500
15	▼5	(China) Yan Bingtao	0	77500	6000	0	20000	10000	6500	3000	12500	0	35000	15000	6000	4000	7500			50000	175500	270000	261500	274000	271500	238000	250500	246500	278500	225500	233000	253000
16	Steady	(Scotland) Anthony McGill	0	100500	0	0	0	4000	24500	20000	5000		4000		11000	0	3500			30000	102000	257000	248500	235500	231500	249500	271500	271500	271500	271000	272500	202500
17	▲24	(Iran) Hossein Vafaei	0	52000	0	7000	0	3000	17000	4000	7500	50000	3000	10000	3000	20000	5500	0		20000	150000	98000	105000	69000	64000	81000	92500	142500	145500	178500	182000	202000
18	▲14	(England) Ricky Walden	0	66500	6000	12000	20000	3000	12000	0	5000	0	20000	30000	4000	10000	3500	6000		0	131500	133250	136750	142000	136000	141500	142500	142500	162500	203500	213000	198000
19	▲4	(England) David Gilbert	0	58500	33000	12000	10000	4000	17000	10000	5000	500	4000	10000	11000	0	0	0		20000	136500	195500	194000	154000	138000	155000	150000	150500	154500	175000	175000	195000
20	▲4	(England) Ali Carter	0	84000	11000	7000	3000	3000	6500	0	7500	1000	3000		4000	10000	12500	3000		15000	86500	165000	158500	161500	147000	141500	146000	129500	129500	140000	155500	170500
21	▲9	(England) Matthew Selt	0	56500	5000	5000	0	0	17000	10000	5000	2000	0		0	4000	45000	0		15000	108000	126750	127000	110000	102000	119000	134000	133000	123000	119500	164500	164500
22	▲18	(Northern Ireland) Jordan Brown	0	101000	2000	5000	0	0	17000	3000	5000	500	0		6000	0	5500	4000		15000	63000	103000	108000	108000	108000	125000	133000	133500	133500	139500	149000	164000
23	▼6	(China) Zhou Yuelong	0	105500		12000	0		12000			0	5000		4000	0	7500	3000		15000	58500	204750	212000	200500	177500	189500	189500	154500	156500	140500	149000	164000
24	▼15	(Scotland) Stephen Maguire	0	45000	0	7000	7500	0	12000	10000	12500		4000		0	0	3500			50000	106500	347000	345500	345500	333000	265000	284500	284500	285500	248000	101500	151500
25	▲38	(England) Jimmy Robertson	0	25500	5000	20000	7500	3000	6500	4000	12500	0	4000	30000	0	7500	5500	4000		15000	124500	79000	90500	95000	87000	87000	96000	96000	97000	130500	135000	150000
26	▼6	(England) Joe Perry	0	57500	2000	0	0	0	6500	3000		0	0		4000	70000	3500	2000		0	91000	186500	173000	149000	115500	110000	105500	105500	101500	146000	148500	148500
27	▲10	(England) Robert Milkins	0	64500	0	0	3000	0	6500	0		0	0		0	0	3500	50000		15000	78000	109500	101000	104000	104000	104000	101000	97000	93000	89000	142500	142500
28	Steady	(Wales) Ryan Day	0	96000	9000	0	3000	0	0	4000		0	10000		11000	7500	0	2000		0	46500	150250	145500	138000	138000	131500	132500	129500	139500	157500	157500	142500
29	▼4	(England) Martin Gould	0	89500	1000	3000	3000	4000	6500	7500	7500	0	0		4000	0	12500			0	49000	152250	150500	146000	150000	150000	161000	158000	155000	159000	168500	138500
30	▼8	(England) Tom Ford	0	56000	11000	0	3000	4000	6500	4000	12500	0	5000		11000	0	5500	4000		15000	81500	171250	149750	128000	132000	138500	151000	148000	149000	137000	142500	137500
31	▲24	(Wales) Jamie Jones	0	85500	2000	0	0	0	0	7500		0	0		3000	3000	3500	5000		20000	44000	87500	87500	87500	87500	87500	95000	95000	95000	101000	109500	129500
32	▼24	(China) Ding Junhui	0	65500				7500	6500	0			0			4000	20000	5000		20000	63000	356750	335250	330500	324500	131000	127000	121000	117000	113500	138500	128500
33	Steady	(England) Gary Wilson	0	33000	1000	45000	4000	3000	6500	4000	5000	500	3000	10000	3000	3000	0	2000		0	90000	121000	144500	141000	144000	133500	139500	122500	120500	121000	123000	123000
34	▲1	(China) Lu Ning	0	83500		12000	4000	4000	0	0		0	3000		0	3000	7500	2000		0	35500	114250	126250	122500	121500	115000	111000	107000	110000	112500	119000	119000
35	▼17	(Scotland) Graeme Dott	0	48000	5000	0		3000	12000	0		0	0		17500	4000	12500			15000	69000	201250	179750	171000	156500	156500	149000	143000	123000	104500	117000	117000
36	▲51	(China) Fan Zhengyi	0	9500		0	3000	0	6500	0		500	10000		80000	0	3500	0		0	103500	9500	9500	12500	12500	19000	19000	19500	29500	109500	113000	113000
37	▲7	(Thailand) Noppon Saengkham	0	26500	5000	3000	3000	0	17000	3000	5000	0	4000		4000	3000		2000		30000	79000	102500	105500	95500	87500	92500	100500	100500	100500	103500	105500	105500
38	▼9	(China) Xiao Guodong	0	69500		0	3000	3000	12000	4000		0	3000		4000	0	3500	2000		0	34500	136000	127500	115500	110500	116000	116000	110000	113000	104500	104000	104000
39	▲4	(England) Liam Highfield	0	48500	2000	5000	4000	0	12000	0		1000	4000		3000	4000	0			20000	55000	97000	97250	93500	88500	94000	90000	91000	95000	98500	98500	103500
40	▼13	(China) Liang Wenbo	0	53000		3000	3000	0	0	4000		8000	4000		17500	3000	5500	0		0	48000	142500	132000	135000	124000	99500	103500	107500	108500	120500	121000	101000
41	▲24	(Wales) Jak Jones	0	53500	1000	5000	4000	3000	6500	0		1000	3000		3000	4000	7500	6000		0	44000	54500	59500	63500	66500	73000	73000	74000	77000	84000	97500	97500
42	▲4	(England) Ben Woollaston	0	38000	2000	0	3000	4000	17000	7500	5000	0	0		0	7500	3500	4000		0	53500	95250	86750	82000	77000	82000	91500	88500	88500	88000	91500	91500
43	▲17	(England) Chris Wakelin	0	42000	0	0	3000	4000	6500	3000		2000	0		0	3000	3500	3000		20000	48000	79250	74500	61500	65500	65500	61000	63000	63000	65500	70000	90000
44	▲7	(England) Sam Craigie	0	56000	2000	0	3000	0	12000	4000			5000				7500			0	33500	87500	82750	78000	73000	85000	89000	89000	94000	94000	99500	89500
45	▲8	(China) Lyu Haotian	0	48000		0	7500	0	0	0		0	4000		0	0	3500	4000		20000	39000	83250	83250	86000	81000	74500	74500	70500	74500	63500	67000	87000
46	▼12	(Scotland) Scott Donaldson	0	41500	0	3000	0	3000	0	7500		0	0		0	7500	3500	0		20000	44500	119750	114250	109500	108500	102000	99500	88500	83500	80500	81000	86000
47	▲15	(England) Joe O'Connor	0	49500	1000	7000	0	3000	6500	0		0	0		0	0	3500	0		15000	36000	75250	82250	74500	74500	81000	77000	77000	77000	77000	80500	85500
48	▼10	(China) Li Hang	0	53000		3000	0	4000	6500	10000		0	3000		3000	3000	0	0		0	32500	102500	105500	95000	91000	80500	87500	84500	84500	89500	85500	85500
49	▲18	(Wales) Jamie Clarke	0	43000	1000	0	0	7500	0	0		4000	3000		3000	3000	0	0		20000	41500	44000	44000	44000	51500	51500	51500	55500	58500	64500	64500	84500
50	▲4	(England) Anthony Hamilton	0	18000	2000	5000		4000	17000	3000	7500	500	3000		3000	3000	3500	0		15000	66500	85750	90750	83000	72000	77000	87500	88000	88000	86000	89500	84500
51	▲1	(England) Mark King	0	32000	2000	3000	4000	20000	12000	3000	5000	500	0		0	0	0	0		0	49500	83500	81750	81000	101000	101000	106000	106500	103500	103500	101500	81500
52	▼33	(Thailand) Thepchaiya Un-Nooh	0	32000	2000	0	0	4000	6500	0		0	0		3000	3000	7500	2000		20000	48000	186000	181250	169000	94000	94000	84000	73000	70000	75500	80000	80000
53	▲13	(China) Pang Junxu	0	50000	2000	5000	0	0	0	4000		0	3000		6000	0	0	0		10000	30000	52000	57000	57000	57000	57000	61000	61000	64000	70000	70000	80000
54	▼5	(England) Mark Davis	0	50000	4000	3000		7500	0	3000		0	3000		3000	3000	3500	0		0	30000	95000	89500	89500	86000	74000	74000	74000	74000	76500	80000	80000
55	▲4	(England) David Grace	0	45500	2000	3000	3000	0	6500	0			0		0	0	3500	0		15000	33000	83750	82000	85000	85000	85000	82000	79000	75000	75000	73500	78500
56	▼20	(Wales) Matthew Stevens	0	27000	5000	0	4000	0	0	0		0	3000		3000	7500	5500	2000		20000	50000	114750	110000	106500	98500	74000	71000	71000	71000	69500	77000	77000
57	▲15	(England) Oliver Lines	0	25500	6000	5000	4000	3000	0	3000		2000	0		0	0	12500	2000		10000	47500	31500	36500	40500	43500	43500	46500	48500	48500	48500	63000	73000
58	▼16	(England) Mark Joyce	0	41500	3000	0	0	3000	12000	0		500	0		0	3000	0	0		10000	31500	76750	72000	64500	63500	75500	75500	76000	76000	76000	73000	73000
59	▲2	(Wales) Dominic Dale	0	39500	1000	3000	0	0	12000	0		0	0		0	0	0	0		15000	31000	78250	81250	72500	67500	79500	79500	76500	73500	65500	65500	70500
60	▼10	(England) Elliot Slessor	0	27500	0	20000	3000	0	0	0		500	0		0	4000	5500	0		10000	43000	88500	100000	99000	91000	91000	87000	87500	77500	78000	80500	70500
61	▲7	(England) Robbie Williams	0	36500	1000	3000	0	7500	6500	3000		8000	0		0	3000		2000		0	34000	37500	40500	40500	48000	54500	57500	65500	65500	68500	70500	70500
62	▼17	(Switzerland) Alexander Ursenbacher	0	50000	5000	0	0	3000	6500	0			0		0	0	3500			0	18000	100250	100250	95500	88500	95000	92000	92000	88000	84500	88000	68000
63	▼5	(China) Tian Pengfei	0	39000		0	4000	3000	6500	0		500	0		0	0	3500	0		10000	27500	83750	83750	73000	72000	72000	69000	65500	61500	57000	56500	66500
64	▼17	(England) Stuart Carrington	0	40500	4000	0	0	3000	6500	3000		0	0		3000	0	3500	2000		0	25000	91750	87000	87000	78000	78000	78000	78000	75000	75000	80500	65500
65	▼34	(England) Michael Holt	0	31000	2000	0	0	0	6500	3000		1000	0		0	3000	5500	0		10000	31000	135000	130250	121500	98500	98500	101500	96500	96500	49500	52000	62000
66	▼45	(Norway) Kurt Maflin	0	47000		0		0	0	0			4000		6000	4000				0	14000	154000	145500	121500	121500	104500	100500	97500	101500	111000	111000	61000
67	▼19	(England) Martin O'Donnell	0	33000	0	3000	3000	3000	6500	7500		0	0		0	0	3500	0		0	26500	92250	95250	90500	82500	77000	81500	78500	78500	74000	74500	59500
68	New entry	(China) Cao Yupeng	0	0	8000	3000	3000	3000	12000	0	5000	500	3000		3000	3000	3500	2000		10000	59000	8000	11000	14000	17000	29000	34000	34500	37500	43500	49000	59000
69	▼12	(Thailand) Sunny Akani	0	31500	2000	0	3000	4000	6500	3000		0	3000		6000	0	0			0	27500	87000	82250	77500	68000	68000	71000	71000	69000	74000	74000	59000
70	▲12	(England) Ashley Hugill	0	13500	4000	3000	0	0	6500	0		0	0		6000	0	3500	2000		20000	45000	17500	20500	20500	20500	27000	27000	27000	27000	33000	38500	58500
71	▼15	(England) Andrew Higginson	0	38500	1000	0	0	0	0	3000		2000	5000		3000	0	5500	0		0	19500	86250	72750	68000	64000	64000	63000	65000	67000	69500	73000	58000
72	New entry	(Wales) Jackson Page	0	0	2000	0	7500	0	0	4000		500	0		3000	0	5500	2000		30000	54500	2000	2000	9500	9500	9500	13500	14000	14000	17000	24500	54500
73	▲4	(England) Allan Taylor	0	15500	2000	5000	3000	3000	0	3000		1000	3000		0	3000	0	0		15000	38000	17500	22500	25500	28500	28500	31500	32500	35500	38500	38500	53500
74	▲1	(China) Gao Yang	0	19000	1000	0	3000	0	6500	3000		500	4000		3000	0	0	2000		10000	33000	20000	20000	23000	23000	29500	32500	33000	37000	40000	42000	52000
75	▼4	(Germany) Simon Lichtenberg	0	26500	2000	0	3000	0	0	0		500	3000		0	0	3500			10000	22000	28500	28500	31500	31500	31500	31500	32000	35000	35000	38500	48500
76	▼6	(England) Ashley Carty	0	27000	2000	0	4000	3000	0	0		0	3000		4000	3000	0	0		0	19000	29000	29000	33000	36000	36000	36000	36000	39000	46000	46000	46000
77	New entry	(England) Andy Hicks	0	0	0	3000	3000	0	24500	0	5000	0	0		3000	0	3500	2000		0	44000	0	3000	6000	6000	30500	35500	35500	35500	38500	44000	44000
78	Steady	(Jamaica) Rory McLeod	0	15500	2000	3000	3000	3000	0	0			0		0	3000	0	3000		10000	27000	17500	20500	23500	26500	26500	26500	26500	26500	29500	32500	42500
79	▼3	(Republic of Ireland) Fergal O'Brien	0	17000	4000	0	3000	4000	0	7500		0	0		3000	4000	0	0		0	25500	21000	21000	24000	28000	28000	35500	35500	35500	42500	42500	42500
80	New entry	(China) Yuan Sijun	0	0	2000	0	3000	0	0	0		500	3000		6000	4000	5500	3000		15000	42000	2000	2000	5000	5000	5000	5000	5500	8500	18500	27000	42000
81	▼12	(England) Steven Hallworth	0	27500	2000	0	0	4000	0	3000		2000	0		0	0	0	2000		0	13000	29500	29500	29500	33500	33500	36500	38500	38500	38500	40500	40500
82	▼18	(England) Nigel Bond	0	32000	1000	0	0	3000	0	0		1000	0		0	0	0	3000		0	8000	72750	68000	68000	66000	41500	41500	42500	37500	37000	40000	40000
83	▼3	(Germany) Lukas Kleckers	0	14000	1000	7000	0	0	0	0		1000	0		0	3000	3500	0		10000	25500	15000	22000	22000	22000	22000	22000	23000	23000	26000	29500	39500
84	New entry	(China) Wu Yize	0	0		3000	0	3000	12000	3000			3000		4000	0	5500	0		5000	38500	0	3000	3000	6000	18000	21000	21000	24000	28000	33500	38500
85	▼12	(Republic of Ireland) Ken Doherty	0	21500	4000	3000	0	0	0	3000		1000	4000		0	0	0	2000		0	17000	25500	28500	28500	28500	28500	31500	32500	36500	36500	38500	38500
86	▼12	(China) Zhao Jianbo	0	21500	2000	3000	0	0	0	3000			3000		0	3000	0	0		0	14000	23500	26500	26500	26500	26500	29500	29500	32500	35500	35500	35500
87	New entry	(China) Zhang Anda	0	0		0	0	0	0	4000		500	4000		3000	10000	0	3000		10000	34500	0	0	0	0	0	4000	4500	8500	21500	24500	34500
88	▼4	(England) Ben Hancorn	0	10000	0	5000	0	0	0	4000		0	3000		0	3000	0	5000		0	20000	10000	15000	15000	15000	15000	19000	19000	22000	25000	30000	30000
89	New entry	(England) Hammad Miah	0	0	0	7000	3000	0	6500	4000			0		0	3000	0	0		5000	28500	0	7000	10000	10000	16500	20500	20500	20500	23500	23500	28500
90	New entry	(England) Mitchell Mann	0	0	2000	0	10000	0	0	3000		2000	0		4000	4000	0	2000		0	27000	2000	2000	12000	12000	12000	15000	17000	17000	25000	27000	27000
91	▼5	(Wales) Lee Walker	0	9500	1000	5000	3000	0		3000		0	0		0	0	0	0		5000	17000	10500	15500	18500	18500	18500	21500	21500	21500	21500	21500	26500
92	▼11	(England) Peter Devlin	0	13500	2000	0	3000	3000	0	0		0	0		0	0	0	0		5000	13000	15500	15500	18500	21500	21500	21500	21500	21500	21500	21500	26500
93	▼14	(Republic of Ireland) Aaron Hill	0	15000	1000	0	0	0	0	0		1000	0		3000	0	3500	3000		0	11500	16000	16000	16000	16000	16000	16000	17000	17000	20000	26500	26500
94	New entry	(England) Peter Lines	0	0	5000	0	0	0	17000	0		500	0		0	0	0	2000		0	24500	5000	5000	5000	5000	22000	22000	22500	22500	22500	24500	24500
95	New entry	(China) Zhang Jiankang	0	0	1000	7000	0		0	0		0	3000		3000	0	0			10000	24000	1000	8000	8000	8000	8000	8000	8000	11000	14000	14000	24000
96	New entry	(Wales) Duane Jones	0	0	1000	5000	3000	0	0	3000		1000	0		3000	0	0	2000		5000	23000	1000	6000	9000	9000	9000	12000	13000	13000	16000	18000	23000
97	New entry	(China) Xu Si	0	0		5000	3000	3000	0	4000		0	0		3000	0	0	0		5000	23000	0	5000	8000	11000	11000	15000	15000	15000	18000	18000	23000
98	New entry	(China) Lei Peifan	0	0		0	0		0	4000		500	3000		0	0	0	0		15000	22500	0	0	0	0	0	4000	4500	7500	7500	7500	22500
99	▼10	(Pakistan) Farakh Ajaib	0	4500	1000	0	3000	0	6500	0		500	0		0	0	0	2000		5000	18000	5500	5500	8500	8500	15000	15000	15500	15500	15500	17500	22500
100	▼17	(England) Jamie Wilson	0	12000	0	0	0	3000	0	0		0	0		0	0	0	2000		5000	10000	12000	12000	12000	15000	15000	15000	15000	15000	15000	17000	22000
101	▼16	(England) Zak Surety	0	9500	1000	0	0	0	0	0		500	3000		0	3000	3500			0	11000	10500	10500	10500	10500	10500	10500	11000	14000	17000	20500	20500
102	New entry	(England) Louis Heathcote	0	0	2000	3000	4000	0	0	0		0	0		3000	0	0	3000		5000	20000	2000	5000	9000	9000	9000	9000	9000	9000	12000	15000	20000
103	▼13	(Ukraine) Iulian Boiko	0	3000	0	0	0	0	0	3000		0	0		0	3000	3500	2000		5000	16500	3000	3000	3000	3000	3000	6000	6000	6000	9000	14500	19500
104	New entry	(Northern Ireland) Gerard Greene	0	0	4000	0	0	3000	6500	0		0	0		0	0	0	0		5000	18500	4000	4000	4000	7000	13500	13500	13500	13500	13500	13500	18500
105	New entry	(England) Craig Steadman	0	0	5000	0	0	0	0	3000		500	5000		0	3000	0	0		0	16500	5000	5000	5000	5000	5000	8000	8500	13500	16500	16500	16500
106	New entry	(China) Chang Bingyu	0	0	6000	0	0	3000	0	3000		0	3000		0	0	0	0		0	15000	6000	6000	6000	9000	9000	12000	12000	15000	15000	15000	15000
107	New entry	(Wales) Andrew Pagett	0	0	0	5000	0	0	0	0		500	0		0	3000	0	0		5000	13500	0	5000	5000	5000	5000	5000	5500	5500	8500	8500	13500
108	New entry	(England) Barry Pinches	0	0	1000	3000	0	0	0	0		500	4000		0	0	0	0		5000	13500	1000	4000	4000	4000	4000	4000	4500	8500	8500	8500	13500
109	New entry	(Scotland) Fraser Patrick	0	0	0	0	0	7500	0	0		0	0		6000	0	0	0		0	13500	0	0	0	7500	7500	7500	7500	7500	13500	13500	13500
110	New entry	(England) Ian Burns	0	0	1000	3000	0	0	0	0		1000	0		3000	0	0	0		5000	13000	1000	4000	4000	4000	4000	4000	5000	5000	8000	8000	13000
111	▼23	(Scotland) Stephen Hendry	0	5000		3000		3000	0	0			0		0						6000	5000	8000	8000	11000	11000	11000	11000	11000	11000	11000	11000
112	New entry	(England) Jamie O'Neill	0	0			3000	0	0	0		0	3000		3000	0	0			0	9000	0	0	3000	3000	3000	3000	3000	6000	9000	9000	9000
113	New entry	(Republic of Ireland) Michael Judge	0	0	0	0	0	0	0	3000		0	0		0	0	0			5000	8000	0	0	0	0	0	3000	3000	3000	3000	3000	8000
114	New entry	(Scotland) Dean Young	0	0	0	0	0	0	0	0		2000	0		0	0	0			5000	7000	0	0	0	0	0	0	2000	2000	2000	2000	7000
115	New entry	(England) Alfie Burden	0	0		0	4000	0	0	0		0	0		3000	0	0	0		0	7000	0	0	4000	4000	4000	4000	4000	4000	7000	7000	7000
116	New entry	(England) Jimmy White	0	0	1000	3000	0	0	0	0		0	0		0	0	0	2000		0	6000	1000	4000	4000	4000	4000	4000	4000	4000	4000	6000	6000
117	▼26	(England) Sean Maddocks	0	2000	0	0	0	0	0	0		0	0		3000	0	0	0		0	3000	2000	2000	2000	2000	2000	2000	2000	2000	5000	5000	5000
118	New entry	(Hong Kong) Ng On-yee	0	0				0	0	0			0		0	3000		0		0	3000	0	0	0	0	0	0	0	0	3000	3000	3000
119	New entry	(China) Chen Zifan	0	0	0	3000	0	0	0	0		0	0		0	0	0	0		0	3000	0	3000	3000	3000	3000	3000	3000	3000	3000	3000	3000
120	New entry	(England) Reanne Evans	0	0	0	0	0	0	0	0		0	0		0	0	0	0		0	0	0	0	0	0	0	0	0	0	0	0	0
121	New entry	(Hong Kong) Marco Fu	0	0																0	0	0	0	0	0	0	0	0	0	0	0	0
122	New entry	(Brazil) Igor Figueiredo	0	0	0	0	0														0	0	0	0	0	0	0	0	0	0	0	0
