= David Gilbert (snooker player) =

English professional snooker player (born 1981)

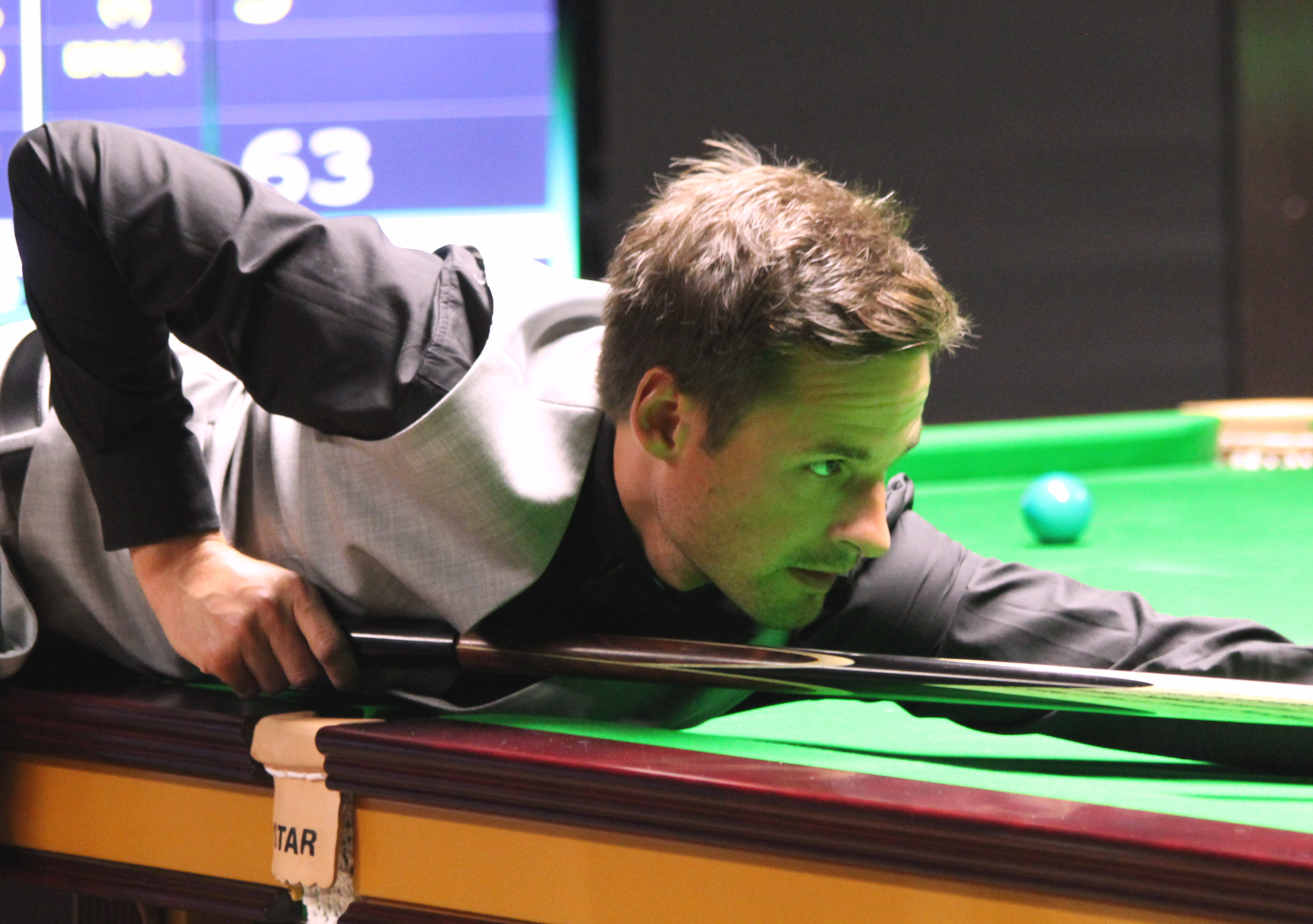
- Gilbert at the 2016 Paul Hunter Classic

Personal information
- Nickname: The Farmer
- Born: 12 June 1981 (age 45) Donisthorpe, Leicestershire, England

Sport
- Country: England
- Sport: Snooker
- Professional: 2002–2004, 2005–present
- Highest ranking: 10 (November 2019)
- Current ranking: 34 (as of 26 October 2026)
- Maximum breaks: 3
- Century breaks: 466 (as of 4 November 2026)

Tournament wins
- Ranking: 1

David Gilbert (born 12 June 1981) is an English professional snooker player who has won one ranking title. Never having previously been beyond the last 16 of a ranking event, Gilbert reached the final of the 2015 International Championship where he lost 5–10 to John Higgins. On 22 January 2019 he hit the milestone of the 147th maximum break, in the Championship League. On 4 May 2019 he narrowly missed out on his first World Snooker Championship final, losing 16–17 to John Higgins in the semi-final. On 13 August 2021 Gilbert won his first world ranking title, the 2021 Championship League, beating Mark Allen 3–1 in the final.

== Snooker career ==
=== Early career ===
Gilbert began his professional career by playing UK Tour in 1999, at the time the second-level professional tour. In the 2007–08 season Gilbert reached the last 32 of three tournaments without progressing further. Most notably he qualified for the 2007 World Championship where he led Stephen Hendry 5–1, before succumbing to a 7–10 defeat. To qualify he beat Alfie Burden, Gerard Greene and Mark King.

The other two were the 2007 Welsh Open – where he won his two qualifying matches then beat James Wattana in the last 48 in Newport, before losing 0–5 to Steve Davis – and the 2008 Grand Prix, where he again faced Hendry and again challenged him before succumbing 4–5.

Gilbert went one better at the 2009 Welsh Open, beating Mark Williams and Joe Perry before losing to Mark Selby in the last 16.

=== 2011–12 season ===
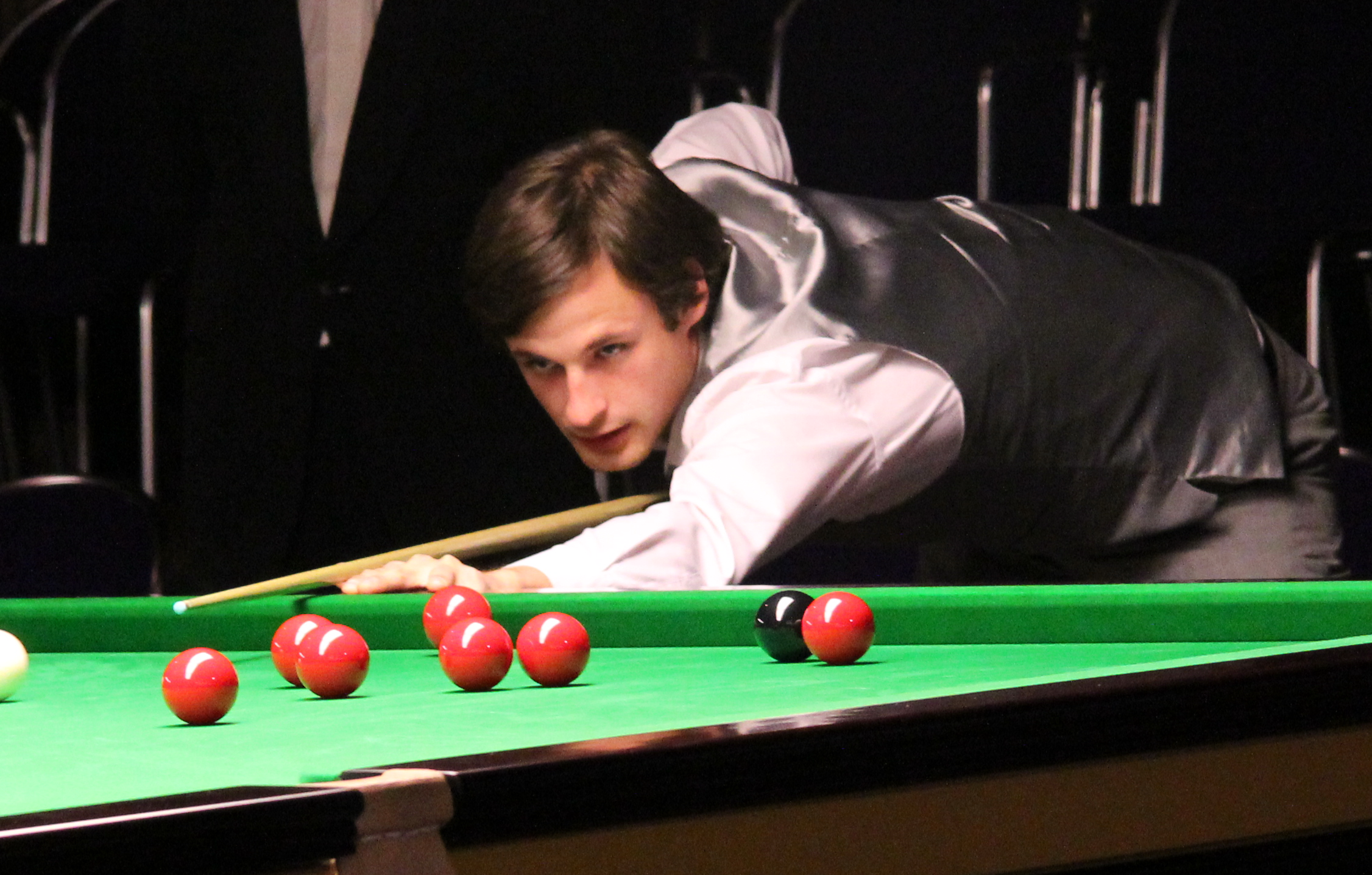
2011 Paul Hunter Classic

The 2011–12 season was somewhat of a breakthrough year for Gilbert as he reached the last 16 in two ranking event tournaments for the first time. He went from qualifying round one to the venue stage of the first tournament of the year, the Australian Goldfields Open, beating Passakorn Suwannawat 5–4, Alfie Burden 5–2, Dave Harold 5–4 and Mark King 5–0 to set up a wildcard round match at the venue against James Mifsud, which was later changed to a last 32 encounter due to the withdrawal of Graeme Dott. Gilbert won 5–1 to meet Mark Williams in the last 16, and was beaten 2–5.

Gilbert struggled to replicate the form he showed in Australia until the final and biggest tournament on the snooker calendar, the World Championship. He qualified with victories over Stuart Carrington, Jimmy Robertson (with a final frame decider), Mike Dunn and Fergal O'Brien and drew 11th seed Martin Gould in the first round. There he won his first-ever match at the Crucible 10–8, although he had to withstand two comebacks after leading 6–2 and 9–5. In the second round he was defeated by 2010 World Champion, Neil Robertson 9–13. Gilbert had led 3–1 after the first four frames, but then trailed 3–5 and 6–10 after the first and second session respectively. He finished the season ranked world number 57, inside the top 64 who automatically retained their places for the 2012–13 season.

=== 2012–13 season ===
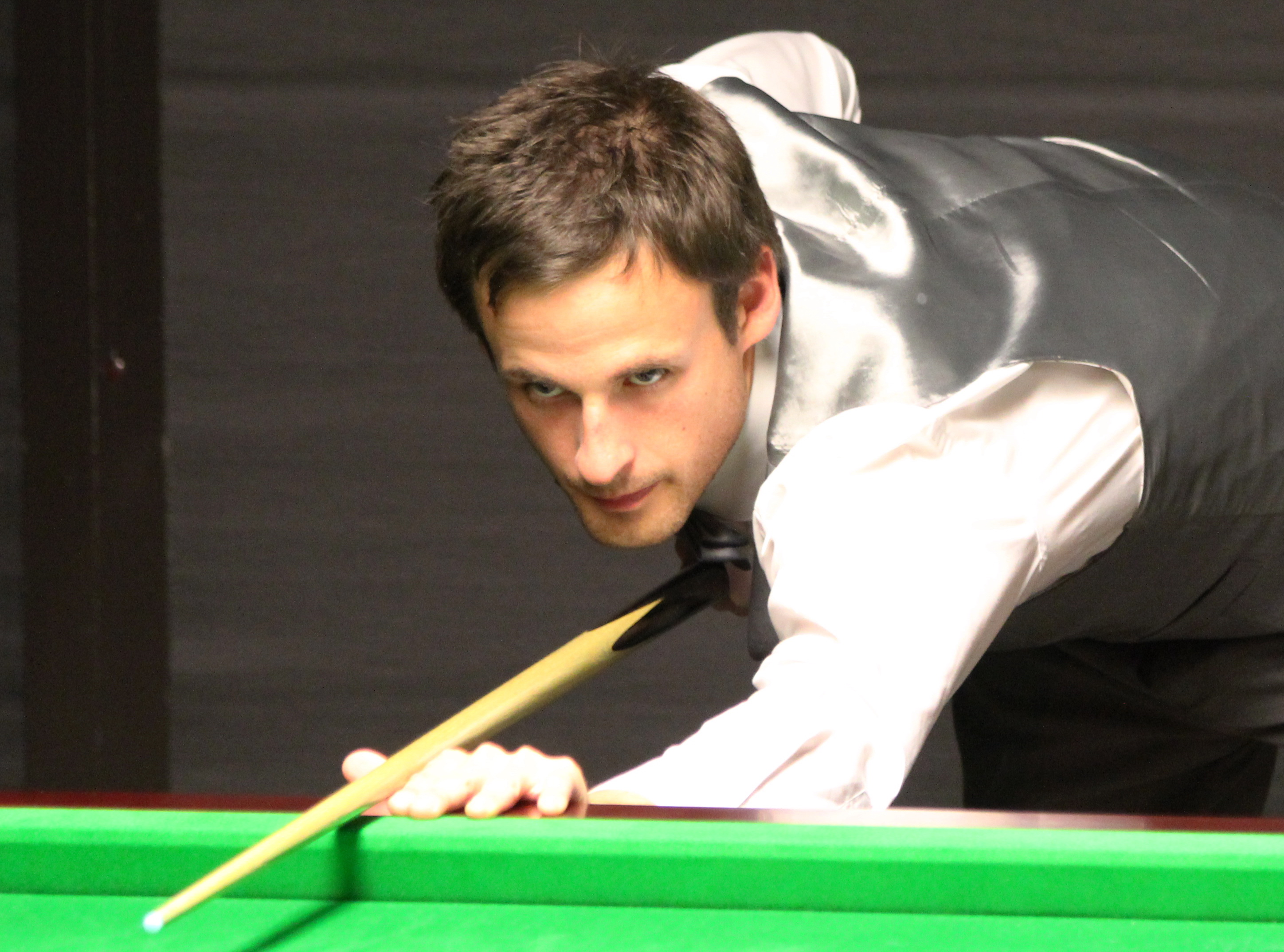
2012 Paul Hunter Classic

Following on from Gilbert's successful 2011–12 season, he struggled for form this season as he could only qualify for the World Open in Haikou, China. There, he beat Lu Ning 5–0 in the wildcard round, before losing 4–5 to Matthew Stevens in the first round. Gilbert played in eight of the ten minor-ranking Players Tour Championship events, but could only win three matches all year, to finish a lowly 86th on the Order of Merit. He couldn't repeat last season's run to The Crucible as he was defeated 6–10 by Marco Fu in the final round of World Championship Qualifying. He ended the campaign ranked world number 41.

=== 2013–14 season ===
Gilbert's 2013–14 season was his most consistent year to date as he qualified for all but two of the ranking events. In his opening match, he defeated Jak Jones 5–3 to qualify for the 2013 Wuxi Classic in China where he beat Andrew Pagett 5–2 in the first round. He went on to beat Alan McManus 5–2 to reach the last 16 of a ranking event for the fourth time but lost 2–5 to Joe Perry. A month later at the minor-ranking Rotterdam Open, he defeated Ryan Day 4–3 in the last 16 and Stephen Maguire 4–1 in the quarter-finals. Gilbert led Mark Selby 2–0 in his semi-final match, but was beaten 4–3. The tournament was one of the eight European Tour events on the calendar and Gilbert performed well in the others with two further last 16 runs to finish 16th on the Order of Merit and qualify for the Finals for the first time in his career. There, Gilbert gained revenge over Selby by whitewashing him 4–0, but lost 1–4 to Perry in the second round.

Gilbert played in his third World Championship this year after seeing off Jimmy Robertson in the final round of qualifying. He faced the previous year's runner-up Barry Hawkins in the first round but from 4–2 up he lost eight frames in a row to succumb to a 10–4 defeat in a performance he branded as useless.

=== 2014–15 season ===
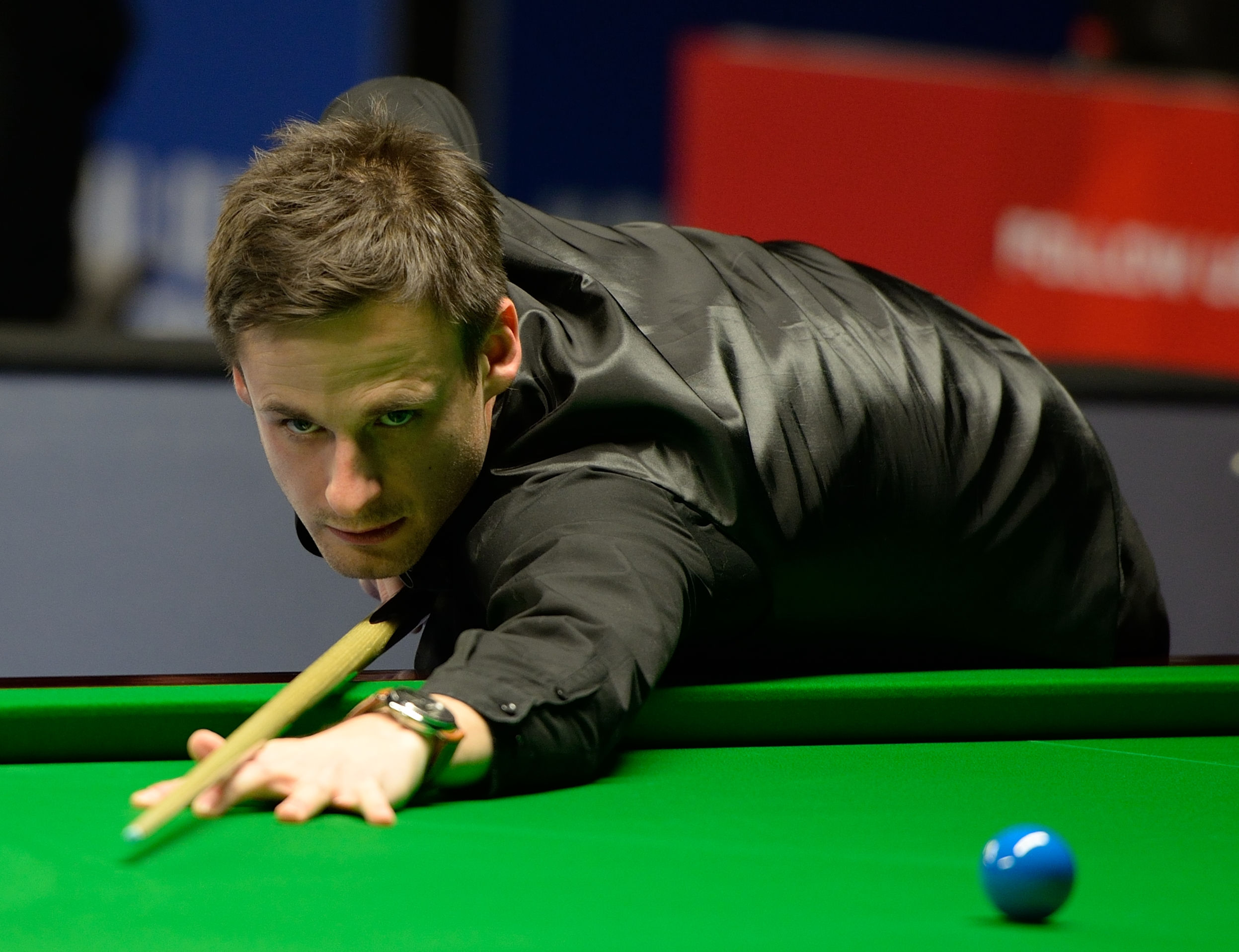
2015 German Masters

Gilbert lost 3–5 to Stephen Maguire in the first round of the 2014 Wuxi Classic and then failed to qualify for the next two ranking events. At the International Championship he defeated Zak Surety 6–4, before withstanding three century breaks from Marco Fu to take the match into a deciding frame which Gilbert lost. He won his first matches at the UK Championship 6–4 against Elliot Slessor and 6–2 against Mark Joyce, but lost in the third round 2–6 to David Morris. Gilbert was eliminated at the first round stage of the German Masters, Welsh Open and Indian Open. He faced the winner of the previous ranking event Joe Perry at the China Open and won the last three frames to defeat him 5–3 and then saw off Zhou Yuelong 5–2 to reach the last 16 of a ranking event for the sixth time. Gilbert's tournament ended with a 2–5 loss to reigning world champion Mark Selby. Gilbert was ranked 35th after the World Championship, the highest he had finished a season at that time.

=== 2015–16 season ===
Gilbert was eliminated in the qualifying rounds of the opening two ranking events of the season. At the minor-ranking Ruhr Open he won four matches to play in the quarter-finals where he beat Barry Hawkins 4–2, before losing 3–4 to Tian Pengfei in the semi-finals. Gilbert's form continued later in to the month at the International Championship as he knocked out Xiao Guodong 6–5, Oliver Lines 6–4 and Ryan Day 6–4 to play in the first ranking event quarter-final of his career. He came back from 2–4 down against Marco Fu to edge it 6–5 which included a 130 break and then saw off Thepchaiya Un-Nooh 9–5. In the final, Gilbert was level with John Higgins at 4–4, but lost 5–9. The £65,000 runner-up's cheque was the biggest of his career and he moved up to 21st in the world rankings afterwards. Gilbert stated that his newfound form was down to a new cue he acquired from fellow professional Matthew Selt six weeks previously. Gilbert was knocked out in the third round of both the UK Championship and China Open 3–6 to Marco Fu and 3–5 to Higgins respectively. Gilbert won three matches to qualify for the World Championship and faced Ronnie O'Sullivan in the first round. He was defeated 7–10, but said it was the best he had ever played without winning a match. He moved up to world number 22 at the end of the season.

=== 2016–17 season ===
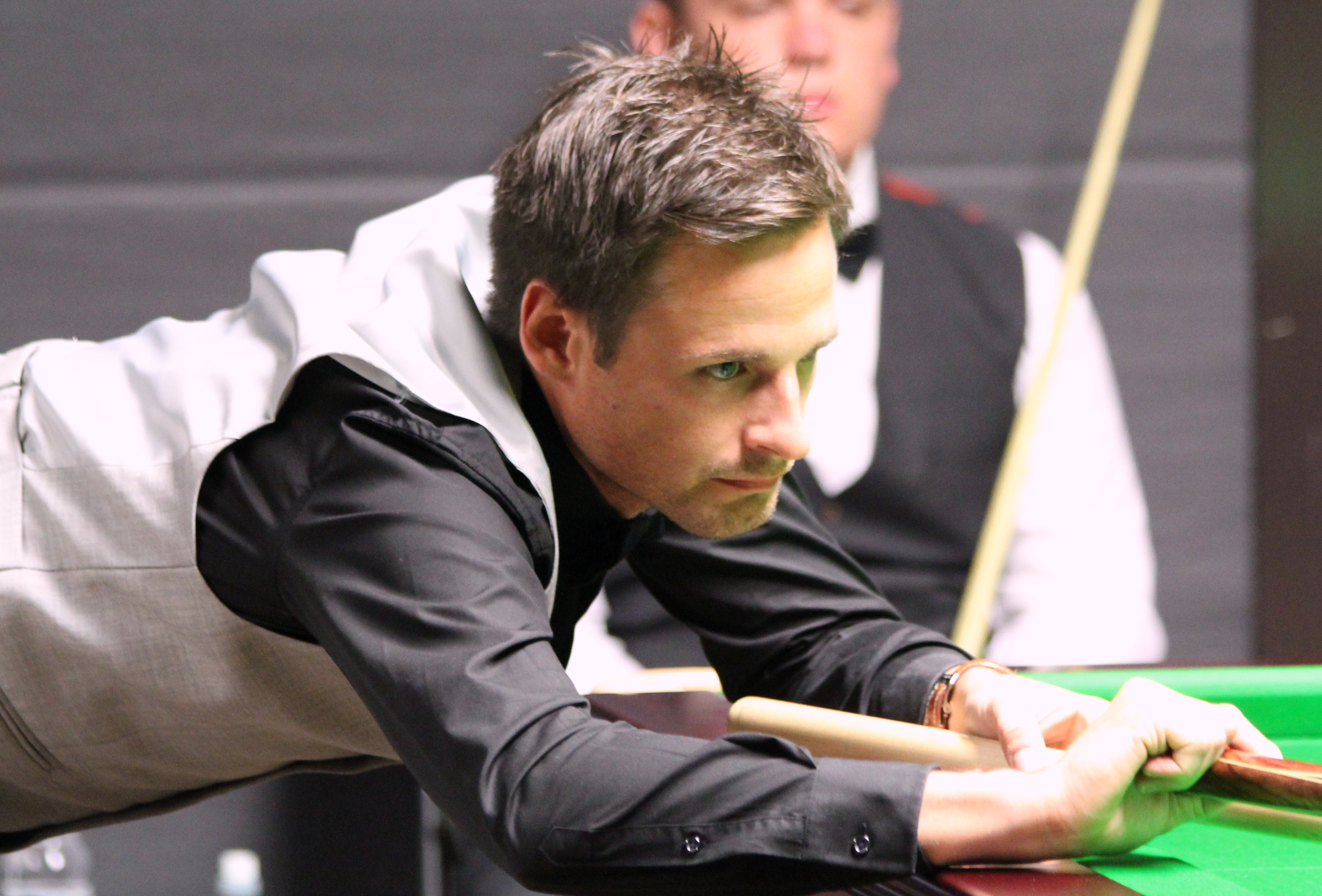
2016 Paul Hunter Classic

Gilbert saw off Rod Lawler 5–0, Zhou Yuelong 5–2 and Zhang Anda 5–0 to play in the quarter-finals of the World Open, where he was beaten 5–2 by Neil Robertson. He had a pair of 6–2 victories over Adam Duffy and Mark Joyce at the UK Championship and made two centuries from 0–3 down against Ali Carter to edge through 6–5. Gilbert lost 2–6 to Jamie Jones in the fourth round. He won two matches to qualify for the German Masters and eliminated Marco Fu 5–3 in the first round, but was then defeated 5–4 by Stuart Bingham despite holding a 4–2 advantage at one stage. After being 6–1 up on Fergal O'Brien in the final qualifying round for the World Championship the scores were locked at 9–9. The decider took 123 minutes and 41 seconds, breaking the record for the longest frame in snooker history, with O'Brien taking it on the final brown. He finished the season 19th in the world rankings, his highest to that date.

=== 2021–22 season ===
David Gilbert won his first ranking title at the 2021 Championship League. He defeated Mark Allen in the final 3–1. He made strong breaks of 59 in the second frame and 57 in the fourth. Gilbert's strong start to the season continued at the following tournament, the 2021 British Open, where he reached the quarter-finals, losing 3–4 to eventual runner-up Gary Wilson, despite leading 2–0 and 3–2. Gilbert also performed well in the qualifying held across August and September for the 2021 Northern Ireland, English, and Scottish opens, defeating Ian Burns, David Grace, and Simon Lichtenberg, 4–0, 4–2, and 4–1 respectively. At the 2022 World Championship, Gilbert lost in the first round to Ronnie O'Sullivan 5‍–‍10.

=== 2022–23 season ===
At the 2023 World Championship, Gilbert was defeated 4–10 by Stuart Bingham in the first round.

=== 2023–present ===
At the 2024 World Championship, Gilbert defeated defending champion Luca Brecel in the first round 10–9. After winning two more matches, Gilbert reached the semi-final where he was beaten 11–17 by Kyren Wilson.

At the 2026 World Championship, Gilbert exited in the first round following a 5–10 defeat by Ding Junhui.

== Personal life ==
Gilbert is married, and he and his wife Abigail have a daughter. He often helps out on his father's potato and general farm in Staffordshire and had planned to do so during the 2007 World Championships, had he not qualified for the event.

Gilbert is an avid philatelist, having appeared at an event with Maria Sharapova in London in 2022.

== Performance and rankings timeline ==
Tournament	1997/ 98	1998/ 99	2001/ 02	2002/ 03	2003/ 04	2004/ 05	2005/ 06	2006/ 07	2007/ 08	2008/ 09	2009/ 10	2010/ 11	2011/ 12	2012/ 13	2013/ 14	2014/ 15	2015/ 16	2016/ 17	2017/ 18	2018/ 19	2019/ 20		2020/ 21	2021/ 22	2022/ 23	2023/ 24	2024/ 25	2025/ 26	2026/ 27
Ranking (Note: It shows the ranking at the beginning of the season)	(Note: He was not an amateur)			(Note: New players don't have a ranking)	84			66	45	43	51	55	76	57	41	37	35	22	18	27	12		11	23	19	20	22	23	31
Ranking tournaments
Championship League	Tournament Not Held								Non-Ranking Event														2R	W	2R	2R	3R	2R	F
China Open (Note: The event was called the China International (1997/1998–1998/1999))	NR	A	A	Not Held		A	LQ	LQ	LQ	LQ	LQ	LQ	LQ	LQ	LQ	3R	3R	1R	2R	2R	Tournament Not Held								QF
Wuhan Open	Tournament Not Held																									WD	WD	2R	1R
British Open	A	A	A	LQ	LQ	A	Tournament Not Held																	QF	1R	3R	QF	LQ	3R
English Open	Tournament Not Held																	3R	2R	2R	F		1R	2R	1R	1R	2R	1R	1R
Shenzhen Open (Note: The event was called the Xi'an Grand Prix (2024/2025–2025/2026))	Tournament Not Held																										QF	1R	1R
Northern Ireland Open	Tournament Not Held																	3R	4R	QF	1R		1R	QF	QF	QF	1R	1R	QF
International Championship	Tournament Not Held													LQ	2R	2R	F	1R	1R	3R	3R		Not Held			1R	1R	WD	LQ
UK Championship	A	A	A	LQ	LQ	A	LQ	LQ	LQ	LQ	LQ	LQ	LQ	LQ	1R	3R	3R	4R	2R	3R	1R		2R	4R	1R	LQ	2R	1R	
Shoot Out	Tournament Not Held											Non-Ranking Event						QF	2R	2R	2R		QF	2R	1R	2R	3R	3R	
Scottish Open (Note: The event was called the Players Championship (2003/2004))	A	A	A	1R	LQ	Tournament Not Held								MR	Not Held			1R	1R	2R	SF		1R	QF	LQ	2R	WD	2R	
German Masters (Note: The event was called the German Open (1997/1998))	A	NR	Tournament Not Held									LQ	LQ	LQ	1R	1R	LQ	2R	1R	F	LQ		LQ	1R	LQ	1R	1R	1R	
Welsh Open	A	A	A	LQ	LQ	A	LQ	2R	1R	2R	LQ	LQ	LQ	LQ	2R	1R	2R	1R	1R	1R	1R		3R	LQ	2R	2R	2R	2R	
World Grand Prix	Tournament Not Held															NR	1R	1R	1R	QF	1R		DNQ	1R	1R	1R	2R	DNQ	
Players Championship (Note: The event was called the Players Tour Championship Grand Final (2010/2011–2015/2016))	Tournament Not Held											DNQ	DNQ	DNQ	2R	DNQ	1R	DNQ	DNQ	1R	1R		DNQ	1R	DNQ	DNQ	DNQ	DNQ	
World Open (Note: The event was called the Grand Prix (1997/1998–2000/2001 and 2004/2005–2009/2010) and the LG Cup (2001/2002–2003/2004))	A	A	A	LQ	LQ	A	LQ	LQ	LQ	1R	LQ	LQ	LQ	1R	1R	Not Held		QF	QF	F	QF		Not Held			WD	LQ	WD	
Tour Championship	Tournament Not Held																			DNQ	DNQ		DNQ	DNQ	DNQ	DNQ	DNQ	DNQ	
World Championship	LQ	LQ	LQ	LQ	LQ	LQ	LQ	1R	LQ	LQ	LQ	LQ	2R	LQ	1R	LQ	1R	LQ	LQ	SF	1R		2R	1R	1R	SF	1R	1R	
Non-ranking tournaments
Shanghai Masters	Tournament Not Held								Ranking Event											A	2R		Not Held			A	A	A	
Champion of Champions	Tournament Not Held														A	A	A	A	A	A	A		QF	1R	A	A	A	A	
The Masters	A	A	LQ	LQ	LQ	A	A	A	LQ	LQ	LQ	A	A	A	A	A	A	A	A	A	SF		SF	A	1R	A	A	A	
Championship League	Tournament Not Held								A	A	A	A	A	A	A	RR	RR	2R	RR	WD	RR	2R	RR	RR	RR	RR	RR	RR	
Former ranking tournaments
Irish Masters	Non-Ranking Event			LQ	LQ	A	NH	NR	Tournament Not Held																				
Northern Ireland Trophy	Tournament Not Held						NR	LQ	1R	2R	Tournament Not Held																		
Bahrain Championship	Tournament Not Held									LQ	Tournament Not Held																		
Wuxi Classic (Note: The event was called the Jiangsu Classic (2008/2009–2009/2010))	Tournament Not Held									Non-Ranking Event				LQ	3R	1R	Tournament Not Held												
Australian Goldfields Open	Tournament Not Held												2R	LQ	LQ	LQ	LQ	Tournament Not Held											
Shanghai Masters	Tournament Not Held								LQ	LQ	LQ	LQ	LQ	LQ	1R	LQ	LQ	2R	2R	Non-Ranking			Not Held			Non-Ranking Event			
Paul Hunter Classic (Note: The event was called the Grand Prix Fürth (2004/2005) and the Fürth German Open (2005/2006–2006/2007))	Tournament Not Held					Pro-am Event						Minor-Ranking Event						2R	3R	A	NR		Tournament Not Held						
Indian Open	Tournament Not Held														WD	1R	NH	LQ	QF	1R	Tournament Not Held								
Riga Masters (Note: The event was called the Riga Open (2014/2015–2015/2016))	Tournament Not Held															Minor-Rank		3R	1R	1R	LQ		Tournament Not Held						
China Championship	Tournament Not Held																	NR	2R	1R	QF		Tournament Not Held						
WST Pro Series	Tournament Not Held																						RR	Tournament Not Held					
Turkish Masters	Tournament Not Held																							LQ	Tournament Not Held				
Gibraltar Open	Tournament Not Held																MR	3R	A	QF	WD		4R	WD	Tournament Not Held				
WST Classic	Tournament Not Held																								3R	Tournament Not Held			
European Masters (Note: The event was called the Irish Open (1998/1999), the European Open (2001/2002–2003/2004) and the Malta Cup (2004/2005–2007/2008))	NH	A	A	LQ	LQ	A	LQ	LQ	NR	Tournament Not Held								1R	3R	1R	LQ		3R	QF	LQ	3R	Not Held		
Saudi Arabia Masters	Tournament Not Held																										5R	4R	NH
Former non-ranking tournaments
Shoot Out	Tournament Not Held											A	A	1R	2R	1R	2R	Ranking Event											
Paul Hunter Classic	Tournament Not Held					Pro-am Event						Minor-Ranking Event						Ranking Event			QF		Tournament Not Held						
Six-red World Championship (Note: The event was called the Six-red Snooker International (2008/2009) and the Six-red World Grand Prix (2009/2010))	Tournament Not Held									A	A	A	NH	A	A	A	A	2R	QF	RR	QF		Not Held		WD	Tournament Not Held			

Performance Table Legend
LQ	lost in the qualifying draw	#R	lost in the early rounds of the tournament (WR = Wildcard round, RR = Round robin)	QF	lost in the quarter-finals
SF	lost in the semi-finals	F	lost in the final	W	won the tournament
DNQ	did not qualify for the tournament	A	did not participate in the tournament	WD	withdrew from the tournament

NH / Not Held	means an event was not held.
NR / Non-Ranking Event	means an event is/was no longer a ranking event.
R / Ranking Event	means an event is/was a ranking event.
MR / Minor-Ranking Event	means an event is/was a minor-ranking event.
PA / Pro-am Event	means an event is/was a pro-am event.

== Career finals ==
=== Ranking finals: 6 (1 title) ===
Outcome	No	Year	Championship	Opponent in the final	Score
Runner-up	1.	2015	International Championship	(Scotland) John Higgins	5–10
Runner-up	2.	2018	World Open	(Wales) Mark Williams	9–10
Runner-up	3.	2019	German Masters	(England) Kyren Wilson	7–9
Runner-up	4.	2019	English Open	(England) Mark Selby	1–9
Winner	1.	2021	Championship League	(Northern Ireland) Mark Allen	3–1
Runner-up	5.	2026	Championship League	(Wales) Jak Jones	2–3

=== Non-ranking finals: 1 (1 title) ===
Outcome	No.	Year	Championship	Opponent in the final	Score
Winner	1.	2002	Challenge Tour - Event 4	(Wales) Ryan Day	6–3
