= 2020 Champion of Champions =

Snooker tournament

2020 888sport Champion of Champions
Tournament information
- Dates: 2–8 November 2020
- Venue: Marshall Arena
- City: Milton Keynes
- Country: England
- Organisation: Matchroom Sport
- Format: Non-ranking event
- Total prize fund: £440,000
- Winner's share: £150,000
- Highest break: Neil Robertson (AUS) (141)

Final
- Champion: Mark Allen (NIR)
- Runner-up: Neil Robertson (AUS)
- Score: 10–6

The 2020 Champion of Champions (officially the 2020 888sport Champion of Champions) was a professional snooker tournament that took place between 2 and 8 November 2020 at the Marshall Arena in Milton Keynes, England. It was the tenth Champion of Champions event, the first of which was held in 1978. The tournament featured 16 participants, primarily winners of important tournaments since the 2019 Champion of Champions. As an invitational event, the Champion of Champions tournament carries no world ranking points.

Neil Robertson was the defending champion, having defeated Judd Trump 10–9 in the 2019 final.

Robertson made the final again, but lost 10–6 to Mark Allen, who won the tournament for the first time.

On the first day, John Higgins made his 800th career century, although he lost the match to Ding Junhui.

== Prize fund ==
- Winner: £150,000
- Runner-up: £60,000
- Semi-final: £30,000
- Group runner-up: £17,500
- First round loser: £12,500
- Total: £440,000

== Qualification ==
Qualification for the 2020 Champion of Champions event was primarily determined by the winners of 20 tournaments over a one-year period, from the 2019 Champion of Champions to the ranking event edition of the 2020 Championship League, thereby including tournaments from both the 2019–20 and 2020–21 snooker seasons. The runner-up in the 2020 World Championship was also included. The field consisted of 16 players but with some players winning more than one qualifying event, there were less than 16 qualifying players. The remainder of the field was determined by the highest ranking player, not already qualified, at the time it was certain that a place would not be taken by a winner of the qualifying events. The first player to receive an entry this way was Mark Allen, who was ranked 5th after the 2020 European Masters (2020–21 season). The second player to receive an entry this way was John Higgins, who was ranked 8th after the 2020 English Open. The third and final player to receive an entry this way was David Gilbert, who was ranked 11th after the 2020 Championship League.

| Tournament | Date of tournament final | Winner |
|---|---|---|
| 2019 Champion of Champions | 10 November 2019 | Neil Robertson (AUS) |
| 2019 UK Championship | 8 December 2019 | Ding Junhui (CHN) |
| 2020 Masters | 19 January 2020 | Stuart Bingham (ENG) |
| 2020 World Championship | 16 August 2020 | Ronnie O'Sullivan (ENG) |
| 2020 European Masters (2019–20 season) | 26 January 2020 | Neil Robertson (AUS) |
| 2020 German Masters | 2 February 2020 | Judd Trump (ENG) |
| 2020 World Grand Prix (2019–20 season) | 9 February 2020 | Neil Robertson (AUS) |
| 2020 Players Championship | 1 March 2020 | Judd Trump (ENG) |
| 2020 Championship League Invitational (March) | 5 March 2020 | Scott Donaldson (SCO) |
| 2020 Championship League Invitational (June) | 11 June 2020 | Luca Brecel (BEL) |
| 2020 Tour Championship | 26 June 2020 | Stephen Maguire (SCO) |
| 2020 European Masters (2020–21 season) | 27 September 2020 | Mark Selby (ENG) |
| 2020 Championship League | 30 October 2020 | Kyren Wilson (ENG) |
| 2019 Northern Ireland Open | 17 November 2019 | Judd Trump (ENG) |
| 2019 Scottish Open | 15 December 2019 | Mark Selby (ENG) |
| 2020 Welsh Open | 16 February 2020 | Shaun Murphy (ENG) |
| 2020 English Open | 18 October 2020 | Judd Trump (ENG) |
| 2020 World Championship (runner-up) | 16 August 2020 | Kyren Wilson (ENG) |
| 2020 Gibraltar Open | 15 March 2020 | Judd Trump (ENG) |
| 2020 Shoot Out | 23 February 2020 | Michael Holt (ENG) |
| 2020 World Seniors Championship | 22 August 2020 | Jimmy White (ENG) |
| World Rankings | 27 September 2020 | Mark Allen (NIR) |
| World Rankings | 18 October 2020 | John Higgins (SCO) |
| World Rankings | 30 October 2020 | David Gilbert (ENG) |

| Player also qualified by winning a higher categorized event |

== Main draw ==
Group semi-finals (last 16); Best of 7 frames
(Australia) Neil Robertson (1) | 4
(England) Jimmy White | 0
Group 1 (2 November)
(Scotland) John Higgins | 3
(China) Ding Junhui | 4
(England) Kyren Wilson | 4
(Scotland) Stephen Maguire | 1
Group 4 (4 November)
(England) Mark Selby (4) | 4
(Belgium) Luca Brecel | 2
(England) Judd Trump (3) | 4
(England) Stuart Bingham | 0
Group 2 (3 November)
(England) Shaun Murphy | 2
(England) David Gilbert | 4
(Northern Ireland) Mark Allen | 4
(Scotland) Scott Donaldson | 3
Group 3 (5 November)
(England) Ronnie O'Sullivan (2) | 4
(England) Michael Holt | 1

Group finals (quarter-finals); Best of 11 frames
(Australia) Neil Robertson (1) | 6
(China) Ding Junhui | 4
(England) Kyren Wilson | 5
(England) Mark Selby (4) | 6
(England) Judd Trump (3) | 6
(England) David Gilbert | 3
(Northern Ireland) Mark Allen | 6
(England) Ronnie O'Sullivan (2) | 3

Semi-finals; Best of 11 frames
(Australia) Neil Robertson (1) | 6
(England) Mark Selby (4) | 5
(England) Judd Trump (3) | 1
(Northern Ireland) Mark Allen | 6

Final; Best of 19 frames
(Australia) Neil Robertson (1) | 6
(Northern Ireland) Mark Allen | 10

=== Final ===
Final: Best of 19 frames. Referee: Rob Spencer. Marshall Arena, Milton Keynes, England, 8 November 2020
| Neil Robertson (1); Australia | 6–10 | Mark Allen; Northern Ireland |
Afternoon: 27–101 (101), 122–1 (121), 33–71 (55), 46–59, 91–2 (63), 0–110 (110), 119–0 (108), 109–0 (109), 4–73 (67); Evening: 51–84 (84), 96–4 (67), 8–73 (53), 67–60, 7–119 (119), 51–76 (70), 7–123 (105)
| 121 | Highest break | 119 |
| 3 | Century breaks | 4 |
| 5 | 50+ breaks | 9 |

== Century breaks ==
A total of 31 century breaks were made during the tournament.

- 141, 139, 121, 121, 115, 109, 108, 104, 101, 100 – Neil Robertson
- 138, 119, 117, 112, 107, 103 – Judd Trump
- 137, 137, 131 – Mark Selby
- 130 – Kyren Wilson
- 125, 119, 110, 105, 104, 102, 102, 101 – Mark Allen
- 111 – John Higgins
- 107 – David Gilbert
- 107 – Michael Holt
