= 2020 Championship League (ranking) =

Snooker tournament held September and October 2020

2020 BetVictor Championship League
Tournament information
- Dates: 13 September – 30 October 2020
- Venue: Ballroom, Stadium MK
- City: Milton Keynes
- Country: England
- Organisation: Matchroom Sport
- Format: Ranking event
- Total prize fund: £328,000
- Winner's share: £33,000
- Highest break: Ryan Day (WAL) (147); John Higgins (SCO) (147)

Final
- Champion: Kyren Wilson (ENG)
- Runner-up: Judd Trump (ENG)
- Score: 3–1

The 2020 Championship League (also known as the BetVictor Championship League Snooker 2020) was a professional ranking snooker tournament that took place from 13 September to 30 October 2020 in the Ballroom, Stadium MK in Milton Keynes, England. The event featured 117 players from the World Snooker Tour as well as ten players from the 2020 Q School Order of Merit. It featured three rounds of round-robin groups of four, before a best-of-five final. It was the 15th edition of the Championship League, and it was a ranking tournament for the first time.

Ryan Day made his second career maximum break in the final frame of his match against Rod Lawler, and John Higgins made his 11th career maximum in the final frame of his match against Kyren Wilson.

Kyren Wilson won the tournament with a 3–1 final victory over Judd Trump. This was Wilson's fourth ranking title. He ended Trump's 10-final winning streak.

== Tournament format ==
There were 127 players taking part in the event. The competition began with 32 rounds of group matches with each group consisting of four players. Two groups were played to a finish every day during two blocks of eight days, from 13 to 20 September and from 28 September to 5 October, using a two-table setup in the arena. The groups were contested using a round-robin format, with six matches played in each group. All matches in group play were played as best-of-four frames, with three points awarded for a win and one point for a draw. Group positions were determined by points scored, frame difference and then head-to-head results between players who were tied. Places that were still tied were then determined by the highest break made in the group.

The 32 players that topped the group tables qualified for the group winners' stage, consisting of eight groups of four players. The eight winners from the group winners' stage qualified for the two final groups before the final took place later on the same day. The winner took the Championship League title and a place at the 2020 Champion of Champions.

=== Prize fund ===
The breakdown of prize money for the tournament is shown below.

Stage One

- Winner: £3,000
- Runner-up: £2,000
- Third place: £1,000
- Fourth place: £0

Stage Two

- Winner: £4,000
- Runner-up: £3,000
- Third place: £2,000
- Fourth place: £1,000

Stage Three

- Winner: £6,000
- Runner-up: £4,000
- Third place: £2,000
- Fourth place: £1,000

Final

- Winner: £20,000
- Runner-up: £10,000

- Tournament total: £328,000

== Stage One ==
Stage One consisted of 32 groups, each containing four players.

=== Order of play ===
| Date | Group |
|---|---|
| 13 September | Group 1 |
| 13 September | Group 2 |
| 14 September | Group 3 |
| 14 September | Group 4 |
| 15 September | Group 5 |
| 15 September | Group 6 |
| 16 September | Group 7 |
| 16 September | Group 8 |

| Date | Group |
|---|---|
| 17 September | Group 10 |
| 17 September | Group 21 |
| 18 September | Group 12 |
| 18 September | Group 18 |
| 19 September | Group 13 |
| 19 September | Group 14 |
| 20 September | Group 15 |
| 20 September | Group 16 |

| Date | Group |
|---|---|
| 28 September | Group 11 |
| 28 September | Group 17 |
| 29 September | Group 9 |
| 29 September | Group 19 |
| 30 September | Group 22 |
| 30 September | Group 23 |
| 1 October | Group 25 |
| 1 October | Group 26 |

| Date | Group |
|---|---|
| 2 October | Group 27 |
| 2 October | Group 28 |
| 3 October | Group 24 |
| 3 October | Group 30 |
| 4 October | Group 20 |
| 4 October | Group 29 |
| 5 October | Group 31 |
| 5 October | Group 32 |

=== Group 1 ===
Group 1 was played on 13 September.

==== Matches ====
- Judd Trump 3–1 Fan Zhengyi
- Alan McManus 1–3 David Lilley
- Alan McManus 2–2 Fan Zhengyi
- Judd Trump 3–0 David Lilley
- David Lilley 0–3 Fan Zhengyi
- Judd Trump 2–2 Alan McManus

==== Table ====
| Pos. | Player | P | W | D | L | FW | FL | FD | HB | Pts |
|---|---|---|---|---|---|---|---|---|---|---|
| 1 | Judd Trump (ENG) | 3 | 2 | 1 | 0 | 8 | 3 | +5 | 86 | 7 |
| 2 | Fan Zhengyi (CHN) | 3 | 1 | 1 | 1 | 6 | 5 | +1 | 73 | 4 |
| 3 | David Lilley (ENG) | 3 | 1 | 0 | 2 | 3 | 7 | −4 | 61 | 3 |
| 4 | Alan McManus (SCO) | 3 | 0 | 2 | 1 | 5 | 7 | −2 | 68 | 2 |

=== Group 2 ===
Group 2 was played on 13 September.

==== Matches ====
- Ryan Day 3–1 Rod Lawler
- Matthew Stevens 2–2 Paul Davison
- Matthew Stevens 2–2 Rod Lawler
- Ryan Day 3–0 Paul Davison
- Matthew Stevens 3–1 Ryan Day
- Rod Lawler 3–0 Paul Davison

==== Table ====
| Pos. | Player | P | W | D | L | FW | FL | FD | HB | Pts |
|---|---|---|---|---|---|---|---|---|---|---|
| 1 | Ryan Day (WAL) | 3 | 2 | 0 | 1 | 7 | 4 | +3 | 147 | 6 |
| 2 | Matthew Stevens (WAL) | 3 | 1 | 2 | 0 | 7 | 5 | +2 | 140 | 5 |
| 3 | Rod Lawler (ENG) | 3 | 1 | 1 | 1 | 6 | 5 | +1 | 90 | 4 |
| 4 | Paul Davison (ENG) | 3 | 0 | 1 | 2 | 2 | 8 | −6 | 31 | 1 |

=== Group 3 ===
Group 3 was played on 14 September.

==== Matches ====
- Robert Milkins 3–0 Chen Zifan
- Gary Wilson 3–0 Jamie Jones
- Gary Wilson 2–2 Chen Zifan
- Robert Milkins 0–3 Jamie Jones
- Gary Wilson 0–3 Robert Milkins
- Chen Zifan 1–3 Jamie Jones

==== Table ====
| Pos. | Player | P | W | D | L | FW | FL | FD | HB | Pts |
|---|---|---|---|---|---|---|---|---|---|---|
| 1 | Robert Milkins (ENG) | 3 | 2 | 0 | 1 | 6 | 3 | +3 | 63 | 6 |
| 2 | Jamie Jones (WAL) | 3 | 2 | 0 | 1 | 6 | 4 | +2 | 103 | 6 |
| 3 | Gary Wilson (ENG) | 3 | 1 | 1 | 1 | 5 | 5 | 0 | 62 | 4 |
| 4 | Chen Zifan (CHN) | 3 | 0 | 1 | 2 | 3 | 8 | −5 | 85 | 1 |

=== Group 4 ===
Group 4 was played on 14 September.

==== Matches ====
- Barry Hawkins 3–0 Ben Hancorn
- Sam Craigie 2–2 Jackson Page
- Sam Craigie 2–2 Ben Hancorn
- Barry Hawkins 3–1 Jackson Page
- Jackson Page 2–2 Ben Hancorn
- Barry Hawkins 0–3 Sam Craigie

==== Table ====
| Pos. | Player | P | W | D | L | FW | FL | FD | HB | Pts |
|---|---|---|---|---|---|---|---|---|---|---|
| 1 | Barry Hawkins (ENG) | 3 | 2 | 0 | 1 | 6 | 4 | +2 | 145 | 6 |
| 2 | Sam Craigie (ENG) | 3 | 1 | 2 | 0 | 7 | 4 | +3 | 89 | 5 |
| 3 | Jackson Page (WAL) | 3 | 0 | 2 | 1 | 5 | 7 | −2 | 63 | 2 |
| 4 | Ben Hancorn (ENG) | 3 | 0 | 2 | 1 | 4 | 7 | −3 | 80 | 2 |

=== Group 5 ===
Group 5 was played on 15 September.

==== Matches ====
- Stephen Maguire 1–3 Leo Fernandez
- Louis Heathcote 0–3 Dominic Dale
- Louis Heathcote 1–3 Leo Fernandez
- Stephen Maguire 2–2 Dominic Dale
- Dominic Dale 3–1 Leo Fernandez
- Stephen Maguire 2–2 Louis Heathcote

==== Table ====
| Pos. | Player | P | W | D | L | FW | FL | FD | HB | Pts |
|---|---|---|---|---|---|---|---|---|---|---|
| 1 | Dominic Dale (WAL) | 3 | 2 | 1 | 0 | 8 | 3 | +5 | 81 | 7 |
| 2 | Leo Fernandez (IRL) | 3 | 2 | 0 | 1 | 7 | 5 | +2 | 62 | 6 |
| 3 | Stephen Maguire (SCO) | 3 | 0 | 2 | 1 | 5 | 7 | −2 | 96 | 2 |
| 4 | Louis Heathcote (ENG) | 3 | 0 | 1 | 2 | 3 | 8 | −5 | 70 | 1 |

=== Group 6 ===
Group 6 was played on 15 September.

==== Matches ====
- Ricky Walden 3–1 Gerard Greene
- Zhou Yuelong 2–2 Zhao Jianbo
- Zhou Yuelong 3–0 Gerard Greene
- Ricky Walden 1–3 Zhao Jianbo
- Zhou Yuelong 2–2 Ricky Walden
- Gerard Greene 2–2 Zhao Jianbo

==== Table ====
| Pos. | Player | P | W | D | L | FW | FL | FD | HB | Pts |
|---|---|---|---|---|---|---|---|---|---|---|
| 1 | Zhou Yuelong (CHN) | 3 | 1 | 2 | 0 | 7 | 4 | +3 | 109 | 5 |
| 2 | Zhao Jianbo (CHN) | 3 | 1 | 2 | 0 | 7 | 5 | +2 | 54 | 5 |
| 3 | Ricky Walden (ENG) | 3 | 1 | 1 | 1 | 6 | 6 | 0 | 75 | 4 |
| 4 | Gerard Greene (NIR) | 3 | 0 | 1 | 2 | 3 | 8 | −5 | 132 | 1 |

=== Group 7 ===
Group 7 was played on 16 September.

==== Matches ====
- Ben Woollaston 0–3 Si Jiahui
- Matthew Selt 3–1 Gao Yang
- Matthew Selt 3–1 Si Jiahui
- Ben Woollaston 2–2 Gao Yang
- Matthew Selt 2–2 Ben Woollaston
- Si Jiahui 2–2 Gao Yang

==== Table ====
| Pos. | Player | P | W | D | L | FW | FL | FD | HB | Pts |
|---|---|---|---|---|---|---|---|---|---|---|
| 1 | Matthew Selt (ENG) | 3 | 2 | 1 | 0 | 8 | 4 | +4 | 71 | 7 |
| 2 | Si Jiahui (CHN) | 3 | 1 | 1 | 1 | 6 | 5 | +1 | 60 | 4 |
| 3 | Gao Yang (CHN) | 3 | 0 | 2 | 1 | 5 | 7 | −2 | 114 | 2 |
| 4 | Ben Woollaston (ENG) | 3 | 0 | 2 | 1 | 4 | 7 | −3 | 66 | 2 |

=== Group 8 ===
Group 8 was played on 16 September.

==== Matches ====
- Shaun Murphy 3–0 Peter Devlin
- Martin O'Donnell 3–1 Jimmy White
- Martin O'Donnell 3–0 Peter Devlin
- Shaun Murphy 3–0 Jimmy White
- Jimmy White 2–2 Peter Devlin
- Shaun Murphy 3–1 Martin O'Donnell

==== Table ====
| Pos. | Player | P | W | D | L | FW | FL | FD | HB | Pts |
|---|---|---|---|---|---|---|---|---|---|---|
| 1 | Shaun Murphy (ENG) | 3 | 3 | 0 | 0 | 9 | 1 | +8 | 111 | 9 |
| 2 | Martin O'Donnell (ENG) | 3 | 2 | 0 | 1 | 7 | 4 | +3 | 128 | 6 |
| 3 | Jimmy White (ENG) | 3 | 0 | 1 | 2 | 3 | 8 | −5 | 69 | 1 |
| 4 | Peter Devlin (ENG) | 3 | 0 | 1 | 2 | 2 | 8 | −6 | 81 | 1 |

=== Group 9 ===
Group 9 was played on 29 September.

==== Matches ====
- Mark Allen 2–2 Jamie Wilson
- Luo Honghao 3–1 Billy Castle
- Luo Honghao 3–0 Jamie Wilson
- Mark Allen 3–0 Billy Castle
- Billy Castle 2–2 Jamie Wilson
- Mark Allen 2–2 Luo Honghao

==== Table ====
| Pos. | Player | P | W | D | L | FW | FL | FD | HB | Pts |
|---|---|---|---|---|---|---|---|---|---|---|
| 1 | Luo Honghao (CHN) | 3 | 2 | 1 | 0 | 8 | 3 | +5 | 128 | 7 |
| 2 | Mark Allen (NIR) | 3 | 1 | 2 | 0 | 7 | 4 | +3 | 106 | 5 |
| 3 | Jamie Wilson (ENG) | 3 | 0 | 2 | 1 | 4 | 7 | −3 | 48 | 2 |
| 4 | Billy Castle (ENG) | 3 | 0 | 1 | 2 | 3 | 8 | −5 | 74 | 1 |

=== Group 10 ===
Group 10 was played on 17 September.

==== Matches ====
- Liam Highfield 2–2 Nigel Bond
- Zhao Xintong 3–0 Oliver Brown
- Zhao Xintong 3–1 Nigel Bond
- Liam Highfield 2–2 Oliver Brown
- Zhao Xintong 0–3 Liam Highfield
- Nigel Bond 2–2 Oliver Brown

==== Table ====
| Pos. | Player | P | W | D | L | FW | FL | FD | HB | Pts |
|---|---|---|---|---|---|---|---|---|---|---|
| 1 | Zhao Xintong (CHN) | 3 | 2 | 0 | 1 | 6 | 4 | +2 | 65 | 6 |
| 2 | Liam Highfield (ENG) | 3 | 1 | 2 | 0 | 7 | 4 | +3 | 80 | 5 |
| 3 | Nigel Bond (ENG) | 3 | 0 | 2 | 1 | 5 | 7 | −2 | 70 | 2 |
| 4 | Oliver Brown (ENG) | 3 | 0 | 2 | 1 | 4 | 7 | −3 | 79 | 2 |

=== Group 11 ===
Group 11 was played on 28 September.

==== Matches ====
- Alexander Ursenbacher 3–1 Riley Parsons
- Anthony McGill 2–2 Lukas Kleckers
- Anthony McGill 0–3 Riley Parsons
- Alexander Ursenbacher 3–0 Lukas Kleckers
- Alexander Ursenbacher 2–2 Anthony McGill
- Riley Parsons 2–2 Lukas Kleckers

==== Table ====
| Pos. | Player | P | W | D | L | FW | FL | FD | HB | Pts |
|---|---|---|---|---|---|---|---|---|---|---|
| 1 | Alexander Ursenbacher (SUI) | 3 | 2 | 1 | 0 | 8 | 3 | +5 | 80 | 7 |
| 2 | Riley Parsons (ENG) | 3 | 1 | 1 | 1 | 6 | 5 | +1 | 88 | 4 |
| 3 | Lukas Kleckers (GER) | 3 | 0 | 2 | 1 | 4 | 7 | −3 | 65 | 2 |
| 4 | Anthony McGill (SCO) | 3 | 0 | 2 | 1 | 4 | 7 | −3 | 29 | 2 |

=== Group 12 ===
Group 12 was played on 18 September.

==== Matches ====
- Stuart Bingham 3–0 Pang Junxu
- Yuan Sijun 1–3 James Cahill
- Yuan Sijun 3–1 Pang Junxu
- Stuart Bingham 3–0 James Cahill
- James Cahill 3–1 Pang Junxu
- Stuart Bingham 3–0 Yuan Sijun

==== Table ====
| Pos. | Player | P | W | D | L | FW | FL | FD | HB | Pts |
|---|---|---|---|---|---|---|---|---|---|---|
| 1 | Stuart Bingham (ENG) | 3 | 3 | 0 | 0 | 9 | 0 | +9 | 127 | 9 |
| 2 | James Cahill (ENG) | 3 | 2 | 0 | 1 | 6 | 5 | +1 | 96 | 6 |
| 3 | Yuan Sijun (CHN) | 3 | 1 | 0 | 2 | 4 | 7 | −3 | 78 | 3 |
| 4 | Pang Junxu (CHN) | 3 | 0 | 0 | 3 | 2 | 9 | −7 | 53 | 0 |

=== Group 13 ===
Group 13 was played on 19 September.

==== Matches ====
- Ian Burns 3–0 Fraser Patrick
- Jack Lisowski 0–3 Rory McLeod
- Jack Lisowski 3–1 Fraser Patrick
- Ian Burns 2–2 Rory McLeod
- Jack Lisowski 2–2 Ian Burns
- Fraser Patrick 0–3 Rory McLeod

==== Table ====
| Pos. | Player | P | W | D | L | FW | FL | FD | HB | Pts |
|---|---|---|---|---|---|---|---|---|---|---|
| 1 | Rory McLeod (JAM) | 3 | 2 | 1 | 0 | 8 | 2 | +6 | 54 | 7 |
| 2 | Ian Burns (ENG) | 3 | 1 | 2 | 0 | 7 | 4 | +3 | 114 | 5 |
| 3 | Jack Lisowski (ENG) | 3 | 1 | 1 | 1 | 5 | 6 | −1 | 139 | 4 |
| 4 | Fraser Patrick (SCO) | 3 | 0 | 0 | 3 | 1 | 9 | −8 | 36 | 0 |

=== Group 14 ===
Group 14 was played on 19 September.

==== Matches ====
- Graeme Dott 2–2 Zak Surety
- Liang Wenbo 3–1 Soheil Vahedi
- Liang Wenbo 3–0 Zak Surety
- Graeme Dott 3–1 Soheil Vahedi
- Soheil Vahedi 1–3 Zak Surety
- Graeme Dott 3–1 Liang Wenbo

==== Table ====
| Pos. | Player | P | W | D | L | FW | FL | FD | HB | Pts |
|---|---|---|---|---|---|---|---|---|---|---|
| 1 | Graeme Dott (SCO) | 3 | 2 | 1 | 0 | 8 | 4 | +4 | 103 | 7 |
| 2 | Liang Wenbo (CHN) | 3 | 2 | 0 | 1 | 7 | 4 | +3 | 105 | 6 |
| 3 | Zak Surety (ENG) | 3 | 1 | 1 | 1 | 5 | 6 | −1 | 83 | 4 |
| 4 | Soheil Vahedi (IRN) | 3 | 0 | 0 | 3 | 3 | 9 | −6 | 68 | 0 |

=== Group 15 ===
Group 15 was played on 20 September.

==== Matches ====
- Daniel Womersley 0–3 Jamie O'Neill
- Michael Holt 0–3 Sean Maddocks
- Michael Holt 3–0 Jamie O'Neill
- Daniel Womersley 2–2 Sean Maddocks
- Michael Holt 1–3 Daniel Womersley
- Jamie O'Neill 3–1 Sean Maddocks

==== Table ====
| Pos. | Player | P | W | D | L | FW | FL | FD | HB | Pts |
|---|---|---|---|---|---|---|---|---|---|---|
| 1 | Jamie O'Neill (ENG) | 3 | 2 | 0 | 1 | 6 | 4 | +2 | 63 | 6 |
| 2 | Sean Maddocks (ENG) | 3 | 1 | 1 | 1 | 6 | 5 | +1 | 56 | 4 |
| 3 | Daniel Womersley (ENG) | 3 | 1 | 1 | 1 | 5 | 6 | −1 | 87 | 4 |
| 4 | Michael Holt (ENG) | 3 | 1 | 0 | 2 | 4 | 6 | −2 | 100 | 3 |

Anthony Hamilton was originally due to take part in this group, but withdrew and was replaced by Daniel Womersley.

=== Group 16 ===
Group 16 was played on 20 September.

==== Matches ====
- Mark Selby 3–1 Fergal O'Brien
- Lyu Haotian 2–2 Brandon Sargeant
- Lyu Haotian 3–0 Fergal O'Brien
- Mark Selby 3–1 Brandon Sargeant
- Brandon Sargeant 2–2 Fergal O'Brien
- Mark Selby 2–2 Lyu Haotian

==== Table ====
| Pos. | Player | P | W | D | L | FW | FL | FD | HB | Pts |
|---|---|---|---|---|---|---|---|---|---|---|
| 1 | Mark Selby (ENG) | 3 | 2 | 1 | 0 | 8 | 4 | +4 | 81 | 7 |
| 2 | Lyu Haotian (CHN) | 3 | 1 | 2 | 0 | 7 | 4 | +3 | 102 | 5 |
| 3 | Brandon Sargeant (ENG) | 3 | 0 | 2 | 1 | 5 | 7 | −2 | 121 | 2 |
| 4 | Fergal O'Brien (IRL) | 3 | 0 | 1 | 2 | 3 | 8 | −5 | 33 | 1 |

=== Group 17 ===
Group 17 was played on 28 September.

==== Matches ====
- Neil Robertson 1–3 Ken Doherty
- Andrew Higginson 3–1 Eden Sharav
- Andrew Higginson 0–3 Ken Doherty
- Neil Robertson 2–2 Eden Sharav
- Eden Sharav 2–2 Ken Doherty
- Neil Robertson 3–0 Andrew Higginson

==== Table ====
| Pos. | Player | P | W | D | L | FW | FL | FD | HB | Pts |
|---|---|---|---|---|---|---|---|---|---|---|
| 1 | Ken Doherty (IRL) | 3 | 2 | 1 | 0 | 8 | 3 | +5 | 109 | 7 |
| 2 | Neil Robertson (AUS) | 3 | 1 | 1 | 1 | 6 | 5 | +1 | 125 | 4 |
| 3 | Andrew Higginson (ENG) | 3 | 1 | 0 | 2 | 3 | 7 | −4 | 96 | 3 |
| 4 | Eden Sharav (ISR) | 3 | 0 | 2 | 1 | 5 | 7 | −2 | 78 | 2 |

=== Group 18 ===
Group 18 was played on 18 September.

==== Matches ====
- Hossein Vafaei 3–1 Jak Jones
- Xiao Guodong 3–1 Farakh Ajaib
- Xiao Guodong 2–2 Jak Jones
- Hossein Vafaei 3–1 Farakh Ajaib
- Xiao Guodong 3–0 Hossein Vafaei
- Jak Jones 0–3 Farakh Ajaib

==== Table ====
| Pos. | Player | P | W | D | L | FW | FL | FD | HB | Pts |
|---|---|---|---|---|---|---|---|---|---|---|
| 1 | Xiao Guodong (CHN) | 3 | 2 | 1 | 0 | 8 | 3 | +5 | 105 | 7 |
| 2 | Hossein Vafaei (IRN) | 3 | 2 | 0 | 1 | 6 | 5 | +1 | 125 | 6 |
| 3 | Farakh Ajaib (ENG) | 3 | 1 | 0 | 2 | 5 | 6 | −1 | 55 | 3 |
| 4 | Jak Jones (WAL) | 3 | 0 | 1 | 2 | 3 | 8 | −5 | 84 | 1 |

=== Group 19 ===
Group 19 was played on 29 September.

==== Matches ====
- Sunny Akani 3–1 Peter Lines
- Thepchaiya Un-Nooh 3–1 Lee Walker
- Thepchaiya Un-Nooh 2–2 Peter Lines
- Sunny Akani 3–0 Lee Walker
- Thepchaiya Un-Nooh 3–1 Sunny Akani
- Peter Lines 2–2 Lee Walker

==== Table ====
| Pos. | Player | P | W | D | L | FW | FL | FD | HB | Pts |
|---|---|---|---|---|---|---|---|---|---|---|
| 1 | Thepchaiya Un-Nooh (THA) | 3 | 2 | 1 | 0 | 8 | 4 | +4 | 57 | 7 |
| 2 | Sunny Akani (THA) | 3 | 2 | 0 | 1 | 7 | 4 | +3 | 76 | 6 |
| 3 | Peter Lines (ENG) | 3 | 0 | 2 | 1 | 5 | 7 | −2 | 51 | 2 |
| 4 | Lee Walker (WAL) | 3 | 0 | 1 | 2 | 3 | 8 | −5 | 72 | 1 |

=== Group 20 ===
Group 20 was played on 4 October.

==== Matches ====
- Stuart Carrington 0–3 Jordan Brown
- Yan Bingtao 3–0 Michael White
- Yan Bingtao 2–2 Jordan Brown
- Stuart Carrington 0–3 Michael White
- Yan Bingtao 2–2 Stuart Carrington
- Jordan Brown 3–1 Michael White

==== Table ====
| Pos. | Player | P | W | D | L | FW | FL | FD | HB | Pts |
|---|---|---|---|---|---|---|---|---|---|---|
| 1 | Jordan Brown (NIR) | 3 | 2 | 1 | 0 | 8 | 3 | +5 | 56 | 7 |
| 2 | Yan Bingtao (CHN) | 3 | 1 | 2 | 0 | 7 | 4 | +3 | 98 | 5 |
| 3 | Michael White (WAL) | 3 | 1 | 0 | 2 | 4 | 6 | −2 | 130 | 3 |
| 4 | Stuart Carrington (ENG) | 3 | 0 | 1 | 2 | 2 | 8 | −6 | 64 | 1 |

=== Group 21 ===
Group 21 was played on 17 September.

==== Matches ====
- David Gilbert 3–1 Aaron Hill
- Lu Ning 2–2 Xu Si
- Lu Ning 3–1 Aaron Hill
- David Gilbert 2–2 Xu Si
- Xu Si 1–3 Aaron Hill
- David Gilbert 2–2 Lu Ning

==== Table ====
| Pos. | Player | P | W | D | L | FW | FL | FD | HB | Pts |
|---|---|---|---|---|---|---|---|---|---|---|
| 1 | David Gilbert (ENG) | 3 | 1 | 2 | 0 | 7 | 5 | +2 | 98 | 5 |
| 2 | Lu Ning (CHN) | 3 | 1 | 2 | 0 | 7 | 5 | +2 | 70 | 5 |
| 3 | Aaron Hill (IRL) | 3 | 1 | 0 | 2 | 5 | 7 | −2 | 58 | 3 |
| 4 | Xu Si (CHN) | 3 | 0 | 2 | 1 | 5 | 7 | −2 | 121 | 2 |

=== Group 22 ===
Group 22 was played on 30 September.

==== Matches ====
- Scott Donaldson 3–0 Ashley Carty
- Chris Wakelin 3–0 Barry Pinches
- Chris Wakelin 2–2 Ashley Carty
- Scott Donaldson 3–1 Barry Pinches
- Barry Pinches 2–2 Ashley Carty
- Scott Donaldson 2–2 Chris Wakelin

==== Table ====
| Pos. | Player | P | W | D | L | FW | FL | FD | HB | Pts |
|---|---|---|---|---|---|---|---|---|---|---|
| 1 | Scott Donaldson (SCO) | 3 | 2 | 1 | 0 | 8 | 3 | +5 | 107 | 7 |
| 2 | Chris Wakelin (ENG) | 3 | 1 | 2 | 0 | 7 | 4 | +3 | 76 | 5 |
| 3 | Ashley Carty (ENG) | 3 | 0 | 2 | 1 | 4 | 7 | −3 | 64 | 2 |
| 4 | Barry Pinches (ENG) | 3 | 0 | 1 | 2 | 3 | 8 | −5 | 69 | 1 |

=== Group 23 ===
Group 23 was played on 30 September.

==== Matches ====
- Mark King 2–2 David Grace
- Jimmy Robertson 3–1 Allan Taylor
- Jimmy Robertson 1–3 David Grace
- Mark King 3–1 Allan Taylor
- Jimmy Robertson 1–3 Mark King
- David Grace 1–3 Allan Taylor

==== Table ====
| Pos. | Player | P | W | D | L | FW | FL | FD | HB | Pts |
|---|---|---|---|---|---|---|---|---|---|---|
| 1 | Mark King (ENG) | 3 | 2 | 1 | 0 | 8 | 4 | +4 | 76 | 7 |
| 2 | David Grace (ENG) | 3 | 1 | 1 | 1 | 6 | 6 | 0 | 116 | 4 |
| 3 | Jimmy Robertson (ENG) | 3 | 1 | 0 | 2 | 5 | 7 | −2 | 80 | 3 |
| 4 | Allan Taylor (ENG) | 3 | 1 | 0 | 2 | 5 | 7 | −2 | 94 | 3 |

=== Group 24 ===
Group 24 was played on 3 October.

==== Matches ====
- Kyren Wilson 3–0 Kuldesh Johal
- Duane Jones 3–0 Kuldesh Johal
- Kyren Wilson 3–0 Duane Jones
- Kyren Wilson 3–0 Kuldesh Johal
- Duane Jones 1–3 Kuldesh Johal
- Kyren Wilson 3–0 Duane Jones

==== Table ====
| Pos. | Player | P | W | D | L | FW | FL | FD | HB | Pts |
|---|---|---|---|---|---|---|---|---|---|---|
| 1 | Kyren Wilson (ENG) | 4 | 4 | 0 | 0 | 12 | 0 | +12 | 125 | 12 |
| 2 | Duane Jones (WAL) | 4 | 1 | 0 | 3 | 4 | 9 | −5 | 47 | 3 |
| 3 | Kuldesh Johal (ENG) | 4 | 1 | 0 | 3 | 3 | 10 | −7 | 53 | 3 |

Daniel Wells was withdrawn from the group after a positive COVID-19 test.

=== Group 25 ===
Group 25 was played on 1 October.

==== Matches ====
- John Higgins 3–1 Brian Ochoiski
- Joe O'Connor 3–0 Amine Amiri
- Joe O'Connor 2–2 Brian Ochoiski
- John Higgins 3–0 Amine Amiri
- Amine Amiri 0–3 Brian Ochoiski
- John Higgins 2–2 Joe O'Connor

==== Table ====
| Pos. | Player | P | W | D | L | FW | FL | FD | HB | Pts |
|---|---|---|---|---|---|---|---|---|---|---|
| 1 | John Higgins (SCO) | 3 | 2 | 1 | 0 | 8 | 3 | +5 | 126 | 7 |
| 2 | Joe O'Connor (ENG) | 3 | 1 | 2 | 0 | 7 | 4 | +3 | 107 | 5 |
| 3 | Brian Ochoiski (FRA) | 3 | 1 | 1 | 1 | 6 | 5 | +1 | 85 | 4 |
| 4 | Amine Amiri (MAR) | 3 | 0 | 0 | 3 | 0 | 9 | −9 | 43 | 0 |

=== Group 26 ===
Group 26 was played on 1 October.

==== Matches ====
- Martin Gould 3–1 Igor Figueiredo
- Kurt Maflin 3–1 Simon Lichtenberg
- Kurt Maflin 2–2 Igor Figueiredo
- Martin Gould 1–3 Simon Lichtenberg
- Kurt Maflin 1–3 Martin Gould
- Igor Figueiredo 3–1 Simon Lichtenberg

==== Table ====
| Pos. | Player | P | W | D | L | FW | FL | FD | HB | Pts |
|---|---|---|---|---|---|---|---|---|---|---|
| 1 | Martin Gould (ENG) | 3 | 2 | 0 | 1 | 7 | 5 | +2 | 104 | 6 |
| 2 | Igor Figueiredo (BRA) | 3 | 1 | 1 | 1 | 6 | 6 | 0 | 70 | 4 |
| 3 | Kurt Maflin (NOR) | 3 | 1 | 1 | 1 | 6 | 6 | 0 | 60 | 4 |
| 4 | Simon Lichtenberg (GER) | 3 | 1 | 0 | 2 | 5 | 7 | −2 | 61 | 3 |

=== Group 27 ===
Group 27 was played on 2 October.

==== Matches ====
- Tom Ford 3–0 Ashley Hugill
- Luca Brecel 3–0 Mitchell Mann
- Luca Brecel 3–1 Ashley Hugill
- Tom Ford 2–2 Mitchell Mann
- Mitchell Mann 3–1 Ashley Hugill
- Tom Ford 3–1 Luca Brecel

==== Table ====
| Pos. | Player | P | W | D | L | FW | FL | FD | HB | Pts |
|---|---|---|---|---|---|---|---|---|---|---|
| 1 | Tom Ford (ENG) | 3 | 2 | 1 | 0 | 8 | 3 | +5 | 123 | 7 |
| 2 | Luca Brecel (BEL) | 3 | 2 | 0 | 1 | 7 | 4 | +3 | 83 | 6 |
| 3 | Mitchell Mann (ENG) | 3 | 1 | 1 | 1 | 5 | 6 | −1 | 65 | 4 |
| 4 | Ashley Hugill (ENG) | 3 | 0 | 0 | 3 | 1 | 9 | −8 | 25 | 0 |

=== Group 28 ===
Group 28 was played on 2 October.

==== Matches ====
- Mark Joyce 2–2 Jamie Clarke
- Jamie Clarke 3–0 Haydon Pinhey
- Mark Joyce 3–0 Haydon Pinhey
- Mark Joyce 1–3 Jamie Clarke
- Jamie Clarke 3–0 Haydon Pinhey
- Mark Joyce 3–1 Haydon Pinhey

==== Table ====
| Pos. | Player | P | W | D | L | FW | FL | FD | HB | Pts |
|---|---|---|---|---|---|---|---|---|---|---|
| 1 | Jamie Clarke (WAL) | 4 | 3 | 1 | 0 | 11 | 3 | +8 | 130 | 10 |
| 2 | Mark Joyce (ENG) | 4 | 2 | 1 | 1 | 9 | 6 | +3 | 82 | 7 |
| 3 | Haydon Pinhey (ENG) | 4 | 0 | 0 | 4 | 1 | 12 | −11 | 52 | 0 |

Mark Williams was to take part in this group, but withdrew and was replaced by Haydon Pinhey.

Lei Peifan was withdrawn from the group after an invalid COVID-19 test.

=== Group 29 ===
Group 29 was played on 4 October.

==== Matches ====
- Joe Perry 3–0 Steven Hallworth
- Elliot Slessor 3–0 Kacper Filipiak
- Elliot Slessor 1–3 Steven Hallworth
- Joe Perry 3–0 Kacper Filipiak
- Kacper Filipiak 0–3 Steven Hallworth
- Joe Perry 1–3 Elliot Slessor

==== Table ====
| Pos. | Player | P | W | D | L | FW | FL | FD | HB | Pts |
|---|---|---|---|---|---|---|---|---|---|---|
| 1 | Joe Perry (ENG) | 3 | 2 | 0 | 1 | 7 | 3 | +4 | 112 | 6 |
| 2 | Elliot Slessor (ENG) | 3 | 2 | 0 | 1 | 7 | 4 | +3 | 57 | 6 |
| 3 | Steven Hallworth (ENG) | 3 | 2 | 0 | 1 | 6 | 4 | +2 | 73 | 6 |
| 4 | Kacper Filipiak (POL) | 3 | 0 | 0 | 3 | 0 | 9 | −9 | 59 | 0 |

=== Group 30 ===
Group 30 was played on 3 October.

==== Matches ====
- Mark Davis 2–2 Chang Bingyu
- Ali Carter 3–1 Jamie Curtis-Barrett
- Ali Carter 2–2 Chang Bingyu
- Mark Davis 3–0 Jamie Curtis-Barrett
- Ali Carter 0–3 Mark Davis
- Chang Bingyu 3–1 Jamie Curtis-Barrett

==== Table ====
| Pos. | Player | P | W | D | L | FW | FL | FD | HB | Pts |
|---|---|---|---|---|---|---|---|---|---|---|
| 1 | Mark Davis (ENG) | 3 | 2 | 1 | 0 | 8 | 2 | +6 | 121 | 7 |
| 2 | Chang Bingyu (CHN) | 3 | 1 | 2 | 0 | 7 | 5 | +2 | 126 | 5 |
| 3 | Ali Carter (ENG) | 3 | 1 | 1 | 1 | 5 | 6 | −1 | 72 | 4 |
| 4 | Jamie Curtis-Barrett (ENG) | 3 | 0 | 0 | 3 | 2 | 9 | −7 | 35 | 0 |

=== Group 31 ===
Group 31 was played on 5 October.

==== Matches ====
- Tian Pengfei 2–2 Robbie Williams
- Noppon Saengkham 0–3 Oliver Lines
- Noppon Saengkham 2–2 Robbie Williams
- Tian Pengfei 2–2 Oliver Lines
- Noppon Saengkham 1–3 Tian Pengfei
- Robbie Williams 3–1 Oliver Lines

==== Table ====
| Pos. | Player | P | W | D | L | FW | FL | FD | HB | Pts |
|---|---|---|---|---|---|---|---|---|---|---|
| 1 | Tian Pengfei (CHN) | 3 | 1 | 2 | 0 | 7 | 5 | +2 | 122 | 5 |
| 2 | Robbie Williams (ENG) | 3 | 1 | 2 | 0 | 7 | 5 | +2 | 112 | 5 |
| 3 | Oliver Lines (ENG) | 3 | 1 | 1 | 1 | 6 | 5 | +1 | 133 | 4 |
| 4 | Noppon Saengkham (THA) | 3 | 0 | 1 | 2 | 3 | 8 | −5 | 52 | 1 |

=== Group 32 ===
Group 32 was played on 5 October.

==== Matches ====
- John Astley 2–2 Iulian Boiko
- Li Hang 3–1 Alex Borg
- Li Hang 3–1 Iulian Boiko
- John Astley 3–1 Alex Borg
- Alex Borg 2–2 Iulian Boiko
- John Astley 1–3 Li Hang

==== Table ====
| Pos. | Player | P | W | D | L | FW | FL | FD | HB | Pts |
|---|---|---|---|---|---|---|---|---|---|---|
| 1 | Li Hang (CHN) | 3 | 3 | 0 | 0 | 9 | 3 | +6 | 95 | 9 |
| 2 | John Astley (ENG) | 3 | 1 | 1 | 1 | 6 | 6 | 0 | 83 | 4 |
| 3 | Iulian Boiko (UKR) | 3 | 0 | 2 | 1 | 5 | 7 | −2 | 80 | 2 |
| 4 | Alex Borg (MLT) | 3 | 0 | 1 | 2 | 4 | 8 | −4 | 95 | 1 |

Ronnie O'Sullivan was originally due to take part in this group, but withdrew and was replaced by John Astley.

== Stage Two ==
Stage Two consisted of eight groups, each containing four players.

=== Order of play ===
| Date | Group |
|---|---|
| 26 October | Group A |
| 26 October | Group C |
| 27 October | Group B |
| 27 October | Group D |

| Date | Group |
|---|---|
| 28 October | Group E |
| 28 October | Group F |
| 29 October | Group G |
| 29 October | Group H |

=== Group A ===
Group A was played on 26 October.

==== Matches ====
- Judd Trump 3–1 Robert Milkins
- Barry Hawkins 3–0 Ryan Day
- Barry Hawkins 3–0 Robert Milkins
- Judd Trump 2–2 Ryan Day
- Ryan Day 3–1 Robert Milkins
- Judd Trump 3–0 Barry Hawkins

==== Table ====
| Pos. | Player | P | W | D | L | FW | FL | FD | HB | Pts |
|---|---|---|---|---|---|---|---|---|---|---|
| 1 | Judd Trump (ENG) | 3 | 2 | 1 | 0 | 8 | 3 | +5 | 124 | 7 |
| 2 | Barry Hawkins (ENG) | 3 | 2 | 0 | 1 | 6 | 3 | +3 | 143 | 6 |
| 3 | Ryan Day (WAL) | 3 | 1 | 1 | 1 | 5 | 6 | −1 | 100 | 4 |
| 4 | Robert Milkins (ENG) | 3 | 0 | 0 | 3 | 2 | 9 | −7 | 43 | 0 |

=== Group B ===
Group B was played on 27 October.

==== Matches ====
- Shaun Murphy 1–3 Dominic Dale
- Zhou Yuelong 3–1 Matthew Selt
- Zhou Yuelong 3–0 Dominic Dale
- Shaun Murphy 3–1 Matthew Selt
- Matthew Selt 3–1 Dominic Dale
- Shaun Murphy 2–2 Zhou Yuelong

==== Table ====
| Pos. | Player | P | W | D | L | FW | FL | FD | HB | Pts |
|---|---|---|---|---|---|---|---|---|---|---|
| 1 | Zhou Yuelong (CHN) | 3 | 2 | 1 | 0 | 8 | 3 | +5 | 134 | 7 |
| 2 | Shaun Murphy (ENG) | 3 | 1 | 1 | 1 | 6 | 6 | 0 | 102 | 4 |
| 3 | Matthew Selt (ENG) | 3 | 1 | 0 | 2 | 5 | 7 | −2 | 108 | 3 |
| 4 | Dominic Dale (WAL) | 3 | 1 | 0 | 2 | 4 | 7 | −3 | 79 | 3 |

=== Group C ===
Group C was played on 26 October.

==== Matches ====
- Zhao Xintong 2–2 Alexander Ursenbacher
- Stuart Bingham 1–3 Luo Honghao
- Stuart Bingham 2–2 Alexander Ursenbacher
- Zhao Xintong 3–1 Luo Honghao
- Stuart Bingham 0–3 Zhao Xintong
- Luo Honghao 2–2 Alexander Ursenbacher

==== Table ====
| Pos. | Player | P | W | D | L | FW | FL | FD | HB | Pts |
|---|---|---|---|---|---|---|---|---|---|---|
| 1 | Zhao Xintong (CHN) | 3 | 2 | 1 | 0 | 8 | 3 | +5 | 72 | 7 |
| 2 | Luo Honghao (CHN) | 3 | 1 | 1 | 1 | 6 | 6 | 0 | 111 | 4 |
| 3 | Alexander Ursenbacher (SUI) | 3 | 0 | 3 | 0 | 6 | 6 | 0 | 90 | 3 |
| 4 | Stuart Bingham (ENG) | 3 | 0 | 1 | 2 | 3 | 8 | −5 | 129 | 1 |

=== Group D ===
Group D was played on 27 October.

==== Matches ====
- Graeme Dott 3–0 Jamie O'Neill
- Mark Selby 3–0 Rory McLeod
- Mark Selby 3–0 Jamie O'Neill
- Graeme Dott 2–2 Rory McLeod
- Mark Selby 2–2 Graeme Dott
- Jamie O'Neill 3–1 Rory McLeod

==== Table ====
| Pos. | Player | P | W | D | L | FW | FL | FD | HB | Pts |
|---|---|---|---|---|---|---|---|---|---|---|
| 1 | Mark Selby (ENG) | 3 | 2 | 1 | 0 | 8 | 2 | +6 | 128 | 7 |
| 2 | Graeme Dott (SCO) | 3 | 1 | 2 | 0 | 7 | 4 | +3 | 139 | 5 |
| 3 | Jamie O'Neill (ENG) | 3 | 1 | 0 | 2 | 3 | 7 | −4 | 54 | 3 |
| 4 | Rory McLeod (JAM) | 3 | 0 | 1 | 2 | 3 | 8 | −5 | 63 | 1 |

=== Group E ===
Group E was played on 28 October.

==== Matches ====
- Xiao Guodong 3–1 Jordan Brown
- Thepchaiya Un-Nooh 2–2 Ken Doherty
- Thepchaiya Un-Nooh 3–1 Jordan Brown
- Xiao Guodong 1–3 Ken Doherty
- Thepchaiya Un-Nooh 2–2 Xiao Guodong
- Jordan Brown 2–2 Ken Doherty

==== Table ====
| Pos. | Player | P | W | D | L | FW | FL | FD | HB | Pts |
|---|---|---|---|---|---|---|---|---|---|---|
| 1 | Ken Doherty (IRL) | 3 | 1 | 2 | 0 | 7 | 5 | +2 | 139 | 5 |
| 2 | Thepchaiya Un-Nooh (THA) | 3 | 1 | 2 | 0 | 7 | 5 | +2 | 135 | 5 |
| 3 | Xiao Guodong (CHN) | 3 | 1 | 1 | 1 | 6 | 6 | 0 | 73 | 4 |
| 4 | Jordan Brown (NIR) | 3 | 0 | 1 | 2 | 4 | 8 | −4 | 92 | 1 |

=== Group F ===
Group F was played on 28 October.

==== Matches ====
- Kyren Wilson 3–0 Mark King
- David Gilbert 0–3 Scott Donaldson
- David Gilbert 3–1 Mark King
- Kyren Wilson 2–2 Scott Donaldson
- Scott Donaldson 1–3 Mark King
- Kyren Wilson 3–0 David Gilbert

==== Table ====
| Pos. | Player | P | W | D | L | FW | FL | FD | HB | Pts |
|---|---|---|---|---|---|---|---|---|---|---|
| 1 | Kyren Wilson (ENG) | 3 | 2 | 1 | 0 | 8 | 2 | +6 | 110 | 7 |
| 2 | Scott Donaldson (SCO) | 3 | 1 | 1 | 1 | 6 | 5 | +1 | 89 | 4 |
| 3 | Mark King (ENG) | 3 | 1 | 0 | 2 | 4 | 7 | −3 | 64 | 3 |
| 4 | David Gilbert (ENG) | 3 | 1 | 0 | 2 | 3 | 7 | −4 | 125 | 3 |

=== Group G ===
Group G was played on 29 October.

==== Matches ====
- John Higgins 3–0 Jamie Clarke
- Tom Ford 2–2 Martin Gould
- Tom Ford 2–2 Jamie Clarke
- John Higgins 0–3 Martin Gould
- Martin Gould 2–2 Jamie Clarke
- John Higgins 3–0 Tom Ford

==== Table ====
| Pos. | Player | P | W | D | L | FW | FL | FD | HB | Pts |
|---|---|---|---|---|---|---|---|---|---|---|
| 1 | John Higgins (SCO) | 3 | 2 | 0 | 1 | 6 | 3 | +3 | 70 | 6 |
| 2 | Martin Gould (ENG) | 3 | 1 | 2 | 0 | 7 | 4 | +3 | 70 | 5 |
| 3 | Tom Ford (ENG) | 3 | 0 | 2 | 1 | 4 | 7 | −3 | 69 | 2 |
| 4 | Jamie Clarke (WAL) | 3 | 0 | 2 | 1 | 4 | 7 | −3 | 54 | 2 |

=== Group H ===
Group H was played on 29 October.

==== Matches ====
- Mark Davis 2–2 Li Hang
- Joe Perry 3–1 Tian Pengfei
- Joe Perry 3–0 Li Hang
- Mark Davis 2–2 Tian Pengfei
- Joe Perry 2–2 Mark Davis
- Li Hang 2–2 Tian Pengfei

==== Table ====
| Pos. | Player | P | W | D | L | FW | FL | FD | HB | Pts |
|---|---|---|---|---|---|---|---|---|---|---|
| 1 | Joe Perry (ENG) | 3 | 2 | 1 | 0 | 8 | 3 | +5 | 138 | 7 |
| 2 | Mark Davis (ENG) | 3 | 0 | 3 | 0 | 6 | 6 | 0 | 78 | 3 |
| 3 | Tian Pengfei (CHN) | 3 | 0 | 2 | 1 | 5 | 7 | −2 | 82 | 2 |
| 4 | Li Hang (CHN) | 3 | 0 | 2 | 1 | 4 | 7 | −3 | 79 | 2 |

== Stage Three ==
Stage Three consisted of two groups, each containing four players.

=== Winners' group 1 ===
Winners' group 1 was played on 30 October.

==== Winners' group 1 matches ====
- Judd Trump 3–1 Zhao Xintong
- Mark Selby 1–3 Zhou Yuelong
- Mark Selby 0–3 Zhao Xintong
- Judd Trump 3–0 Zhou Yuelong
- Zhou Yuelong 2–2 Zhao Xintong
- Judd Trump 0–3 Mark Selby

==== Winners' group 1 table ====
| Pos. | Player | P | W | D | L | FW | FL | FD | HB | Pts |
|---|---|---|---|---|---|---|---|---|---|---|
| 1 | Judd Trump (ENG) | 3 | 2 | 0 | 1 | 6 | 4 | +2 | 60 | 6 |
| 2 | Zhao Xintong (CHN) | 3 | 1 | 1 | 1 | 6 | 5 | +1 | 117 | 4 |
| 3 | Zhou Yuelong (CHN) | 3 | 1 | 1 | 1 | 5 | 6 | −1 | 102 | 4 |
| 4 | Mark Selby (ENG) | 3 | 1 | 0 | 2 | 4 | 6 | −2 | 134 | 3 |

=== Winners' group 2 ===
Winners' group 2 was played on 30 October.

==== Winners' group 2 matches ====
- John Higgins 3–0 Joe Perry
- Kyren Wilson 3–1 Ken Doherty
- Kyren Wilson 3–0 Joe Perry
- John Higgins 0–3 Ken Doherty
- Kyren Wilson 1–3 John Higgins
- Joe Perry 2–2 Ken Doherty

==== Winners' group 2 table ====
| Pos. | Player | P | W | D | L | FW | FL | FD | HB | Pts |
|---|---|---|---|---|---|---|---|---|---|---|
| 1 | Kyren Wilson (ENG) | 3 | 2 | 0 | 1 | 7 | 4 | +3 | 100 | 6 |
| 2 | John Higgins (SCO) | 3 | 2 | 0 | 1 | 6 | 4 | +2 | 147 | 6 |
| 3 | Ken Doherty (IRL) | 3 | 1 | 1 | 1 | 6 | 5 | +1 | 122 | 4 |
| 4 | Joe Perry (ENG) | 3 | 0 | 1 | 2 | 2 | 8 | −6 | 74 | 1 |

Key: P = Matches played; W = Matches won; D = Matches drawn; L = Matches lost; FW = Frames won; FL = Frames lost; FD = Frame difference; HB = Highest break

== Final ==
Final: Best of 5 frames. Referee: Marcel Eckardt. Ballroom, Stadium MK, Milton Keynes, England, 30 October 2020.
| Judd Trump; England | 1–3 | Kyren Wilson; England |
Frame scores: 20–72, 118–0 (118), 11–69, 0–88
| 118 | Highest break | 88 |
| 1 | Century breaks | 0 |

== Century breaks ==
A total of 90 century breaks were made during the tournament.

- 147, 126, 123, 107 – John Higgins
- 147, 100, 100 – Ryan Day
- 145, 143, 133, 116, 101 – Barry Hawkins
- 140 – Matthew Stevens
- 139, 122, 109 – Ken Doherty
- 139, 103, 100 – Graeme Dott
- 139 – Jack Lisowski
- 138, 112, 109, 102 – Joe Perry
- 135, 108 – Thepchaiya Un-Nooh
- 134, 134, 122, 119, 114, 109, 102, 100 – Zhou Yuelong
- 134, 128, 118, 118, 109 – Mark Selby
- 133 – Oliver Lines
- 132 – Gerard Greene
- 130, 112 – Jamie Clarke
- 130 – Michael White
- 129, 127 – Stuart Bingham
- 128, 111 – Luo Honghao
- 128 – Martin O'Donnell
- 126, 120 – Chang Bingyu
- 125, 124, 100 – Neil Robertson
- 125, 110, 104, 103, 100 – Kyren Wilson
- 125 – David Gilbert
- 125 – Hossein Vafaei
- 124, 118, 110 – Judd Trump
- 123 – Tom Ford
- 122, 109 – Tian Pengfei
- 121, 100 – Mark Davis
- 121 – Brandon Sargeant
- 121 – Xu Si
- 117 – Zhao Xintong
- 116, 102 – David Grace
- 114, 107 – Gao Yang
- 114 – Ian Burns
- 112 – Robbie Williams
- 111, 102 – Shaun Murphy
- 108 – Matthew Selt
- 107 – Scott Donaldson
- 107 – Joe O'Connor
- 106 – Mark Allen
- 105, 102 – Liang Wenbo
- 105 – Xiao Guodong
- 104 – Martin Gould
- 103 – Jamie Jones
- 102 – Lyu Haotian
- 100 – Michael Holt
