= 2019–20 Championship League =

Snooker tournament, held 2019/20

2020 Championship League (March)

Tournament information
- Dates: 7 October 2019 – 5 March 2020
- Venue: Morningside Arena
- City: Leicester
- Country: England
- Format: Non-ranking event
- Total prize fund: £182,400
- Winner's share: £10,000 (plus bonuses)
- Highest break: Judd Trump (ENG) (145)

Final
- Champion: Scott Donaldson (SCO)
- Runner-up: Graeme Dott (SCO)
- Score: 3–0

The 2019–2020 Championship League was a professional snooker tournament, taking place over most of the 2019-20 snooker season from 7 October 2019 to 5 March 2020 at the Morningside Arena in Leicester, England. The event features seven group stages before a finals stage in March 2020; the first four played in October, two in January, and the final group played in March. It was the 13th staging of the Championship League. The event featured a total prize fund of £182,400 with the winner receiving £20,700. The losing finalist received £6,000 more than the winner due to having played in all groups starting from Group 3.

Martin Gould was the defending champion, having won the 2019 edition of the tournament, beating Jack Lisowski 3–1 in the final. However, Gould did not participate in this event. Scott Donaldson won the tournament, having qualified from group four and defeated Graeme Dott 3–0 in the final. This was the first professional snooker title of Donaldson's career.

== Tournament format ==
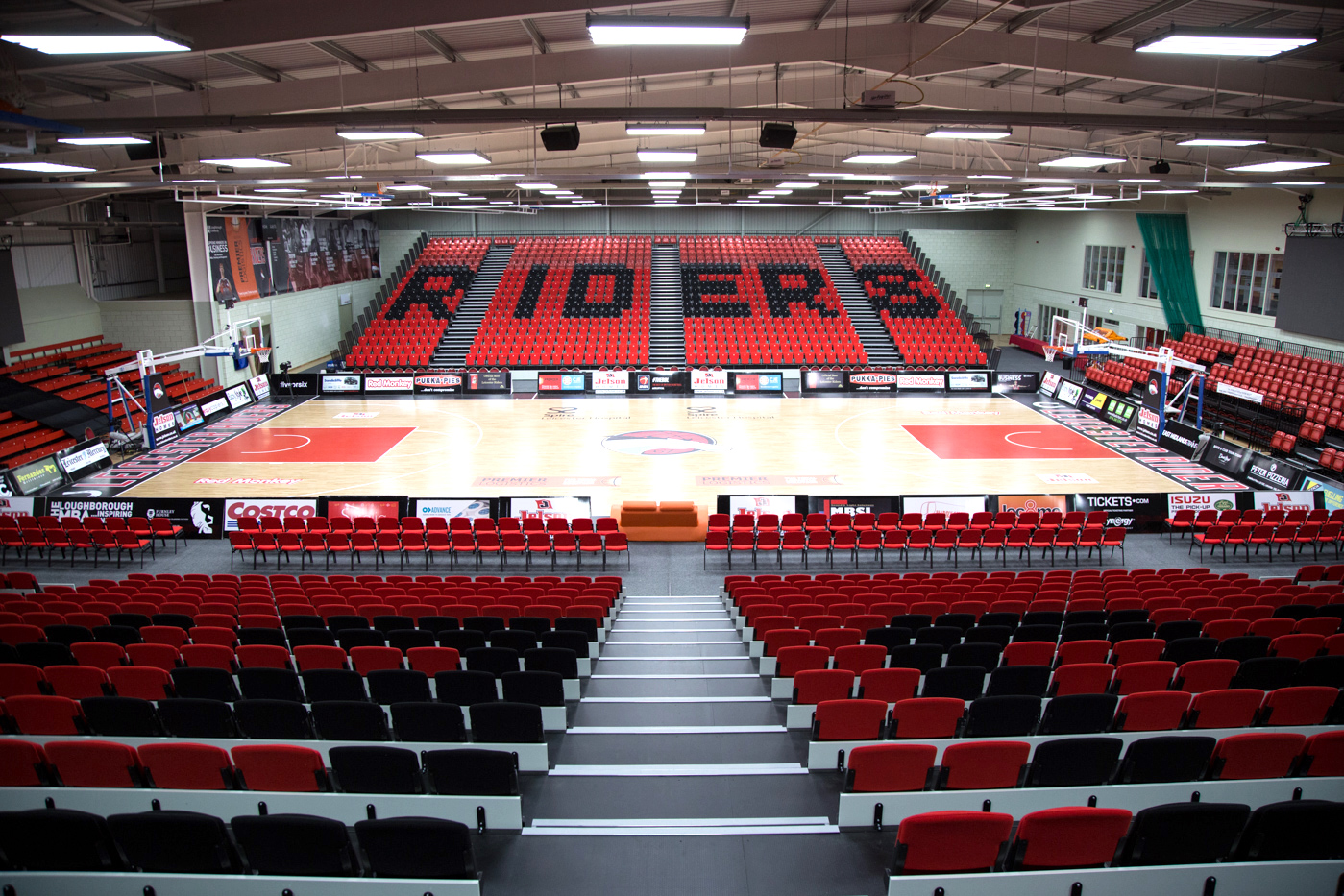
The event took place at the Morningside Arena in Leicester (shown setup for basketball).

The Championship League was a professional snooker event that took place between 7 October 2019 to 5 March 2020 at the Morningside Arena in Leicester, England. All matches were the best of 5 frames, and played as a round-robin, with seven groups consisting of seven players. From each group the top four players qualified for a knockout round, the winner of which qualified for an eighth "winners group". The lowest two players of each group are eliminated and the remaining four move to the next group, where they are joined by three more participants.

The winners group is played in the same way, with the winner of the knockout phase named as champion, and a place at the 2020 Champion of Champions. The event was sponsored by sports betting company BetVictor; and was broadcast via streaming on various betting websites, as well as on zhibo.tv in China.

=== Prize fund ===
The breakdown of prize money for the 2019–20 Championship League is shown below.

Group 1–7

- Winner: £3,000
- Runner-up: £2,000
- Semi-final: £1,000
- Frame-win (league stage): £100
- Frame-win (play-offs): £300
- Highest break: £500

Winners' Group

- Winner: £10,000
- Runner-up: £5,000
- Semi-final: £3,000
- Frame-win (league stage): £200
- Frame-win (play-offs): £300
- Highest break: £1,000

- Tournament total: £182,400

== Tournament summary ==
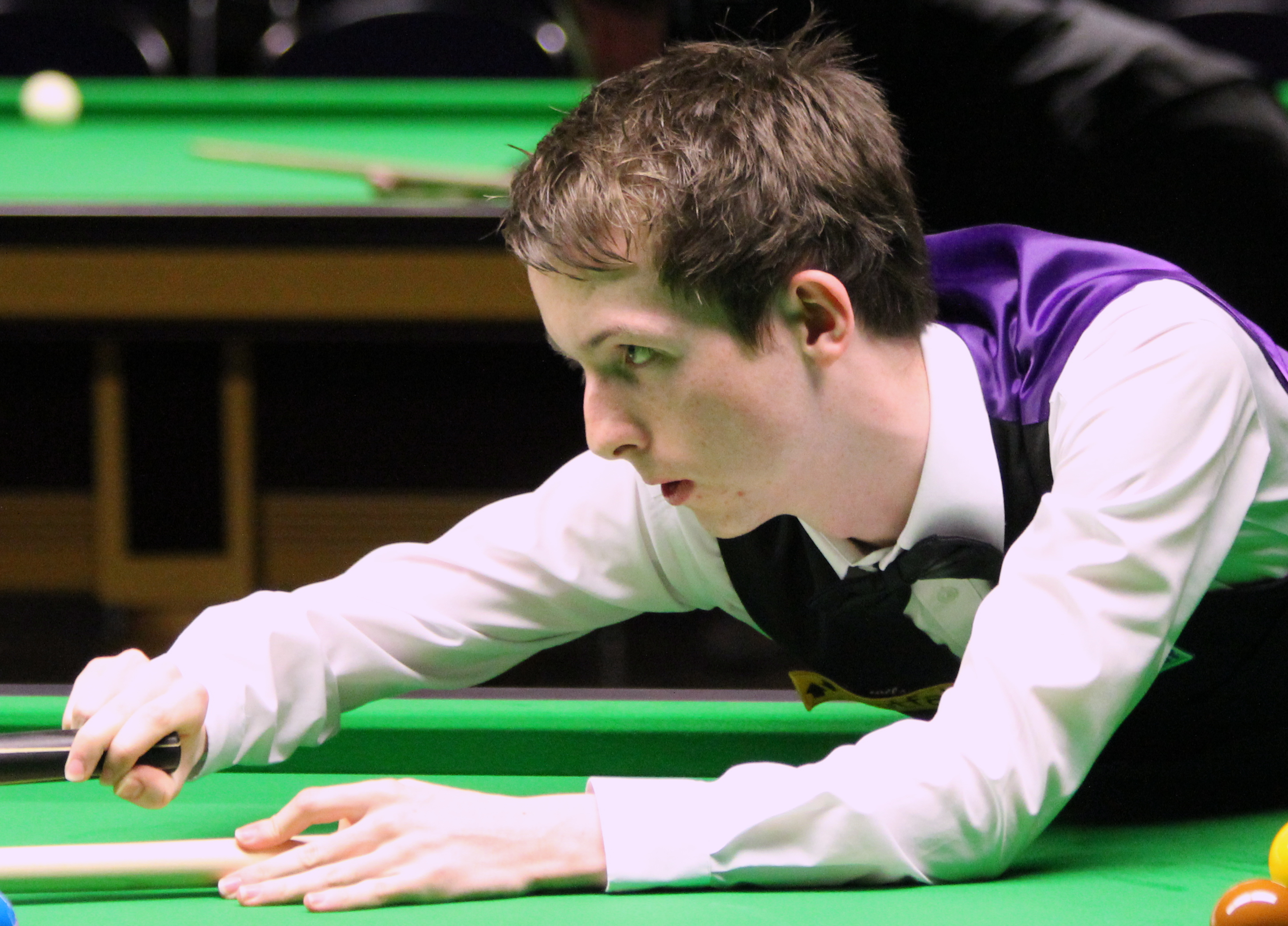
Scott Donaldson won his first professional championship at the event.

Group 1 was played on 7 and 8 October 2019, where Neil Robertson defeated Ryan Day 3–2 in the final. The second group was played on 9 and 10 October, with Stuart Bingham defeating Mark Selby 3–1 to win the group. After this, Selby and Barry Hawkins declined to continue, and were replaced by Xiao Guodong and Ben Woollaston, but both were eliminated in the third group. Group 3 was played on 21 and 22 October 2019, with Gary Wilson defeating Kyren Wilson 3–0. The group 3 matches saw a record number of century breaks made in a Championship League group with a total of 24, beating the record of 23 from the previous year's Winners' Group.

The fourth group was played on 23 and 24 October 2019. Scott Donaldson defeated compatriot Graeme Dott 3–0 in the final. Group 5 was played on 6 and 7 January 2020. Mark Williams won all six of his group matches, but lost in the first round against David Gilbert 2–3. Anthony McGill defeated Gilbert in the final to win the group. On 8 and 9 January 2020 in group six; Judd Trump won after a 3–1 victory over Graeme Dott. Trump also made the highest break of the tournament, a 145 in group six. Group 7 was played on 2 and 3 March 2020. Dott defeated Williams 3–1 to be the last qualifier.

The Winners' Group was played on 4 and 5 March 2020. On the first day, Trump made his 700th career century break in his round-robin match against McGill. The four players who qualified from the Winner's Group were Trump, Dott, McGill and Donaldson. Donaldson defeated Trump 3–1, whilst Dott beat Williams 3–2. Donaldson won his first professional tournament with a 3–0 victory over Dott in the final. Due to the additional prizes for frame wins, Donaldson was awarded a total of £20,700 throughout the tournament.

== Group 1 ==
Group 1 was played on 7 and 8 October 2019. Neil Robertson was the first player to qualify for the Winners' Group.

=== Matches ===
- Luca Brecel 0–3 Mark Selby
- Barry Hawkins 3–1 Neil Robertson
- Jack Lisowski 1–3 Luca Brecel
- Jimmy Robertson 1–3 Ryan Day
- Mark Selby 1–3 Barry Hawkins
- Neil Robertson 0–3 Jimmy Robertson
- Luca Brecel 2–3 Barry Hawkins
- Ryan Day 2–3 Jack Lisowski
- Mark Selby 2–3 Neil Robertson
- Jimmy Robertson 3–2 Jack Lisowski
- Ryan Day 1–3 Neil Robertson
- Barry Hawkins 3–2 Jack Lisowski
- Luca Brecel 1–3 Ryan Day
- Mark Selby 3–1 Jimmy Robertson
- Barry Hawkins 3–2 Ryan Day
- Neil Robertson 3–1 Jack Lisowski
- Luca Brecel 3–2 Jimmy Robertson
- Mark Selby 0–3 Jack Lisowski
- Barry Hawkins 3–0 Jimmy Robertson
- Mark Selby 3–2 Ryan Day
- Luca Brecel 1–3 Neil Robertson

=== Table ===
Pos	Player	Pld	W	L	FF	FA	FD	
1	Barry Hawkins (ENG)	6	6	0	18	8	+10	Qualification to Group 1 play-off
2	Neil Robertson (AUS)	6	4	2	13	11	+2	Qualification to Group 1 play-off
3	Mark Selby (ENG)	6	3	3	12	12	0	Qualification to Group 1 play-off
4	Ryan Day (WAL)	6	2	4	13	14	−1	Qualification to Group 1 play-off
5	Jack Lisowski (ENG)	6	2	4	12	14	−2	Advances into Group 2
6	Jimmy Robertson (ENG)	6	2	4	10	14	−4	Eliminated from the competition
7	Luca Brecel (BEL)	6	2	4	10	15	−5	Eliminated from the competition

Source: Championship League Snooker by Matchroom Sport

=== Play-offs ===
Semi-finals; Best of 5 frames
Barry Hawkins (ENG)	0
Ryan Day (WAL)	3
Neil Robertson (AUS)	3
Mark Selby (ENG)	2

Final; Best of 5 frames
Ryan Day (WAL)	2
Neil Robertson (AUS)	3

== Group 2 ==
Group 2 was played on 9 and 10 October 2019. Stuart Bingham was the second player to qualify for the Winners' Group.

=== Matches ===
- Kyren Wilson 3–0 Stuart Bingham
- Gary Wilson 3–0 Jack Lisowski
- Barry Hawkins 2–3 Kyren Wilson
- Mark Selby 3–0 Ryan Day
- Stuart Bingham 3–1 Gary Wilson
- Jack Lisowski 0–3 Mark Selby
- Kyren Wilson 2–3 Gary Wilson
- Ryan Day 3–0 Barry Hawkins
- Stuart Bingham 3–2 Jack Lisowski
- Mark Selby 2–3 Barry Hawkins
- Ryan Day 2–3 Jack Lisowski
- Gary Wilson 3–1 Barry Hawkins
- Kyren Wilson 3–0 Ryan Day
- Stuart Bingham 3–2 Mark Selby
- Gary Wilson 3–0 Ryan Day
- Jack Lisowski 1–3 Barry Hawkins
- Kyren Wilson 3–2 Mark Selby
- Stuart Bingham 1–3 Barry Hawkins
- Gary Wilson 0–3 Mark Selby
- Stuart Bingham 3–2 Ryan Day
- Kyren Wilson 3–0 Jack Lisowski

=== Table ===
Pos	Player	Pld	W	L	FF	FA	FD	
1	Kyren Wilson (ENG)	6	5	1	17	7	+10	Qualification to Group 2 play-off
2	Gary Wilson (ENG)	6	4	2	13	9	+4	Qualification to Group 2 play-off
3	Stuart Bingham (ENG)	6	4	2	13	13	0	Qualification to Group 2 play-off
4	Mark Selby (ENG)	6	3	3	15	9	+6	Qualification to Group 2 play-off
5	Barry Hawkins (ENG)	6	3	3	12	13	−1	Advances into Group 3
6	Ryan Day (WAL)	6	1	5	7	15	−8	Eliminated from the competition
7	Jack Lisowski (ENG)	6	1	5	6	17	−11	Eliminated from the competition

Source: Championship League Snooker by Matchroom Sport

=== Play-offs ===
Semi-finals; Best of 5 frames
Kyren Wilson (ENG)	1
Mark Selby (ENG)	3
Gary Wilson (ENG)	0
Stuart Bingham (ENG)	3

Final; Best of 5 frames
Mark Selby (ENG)	1
Stuart Bingham (ENG)	3

== Group 3 ==
Group 3 was played on 21 and 22 October 2019. Gary Wilson was the third player to qualify for the Winners' Group.

=== Matches ===
- Xiao Guodong 0–3 Tom Ford
- Ben Woollaston 0–3 Graeme Dott
- Kyren Wilson 2–3 Xiao Guodong
- Gary Wilson 3–2 Matthew Selt
- Tom Ford 3–1 Ben Woollaston
- Graeme Dott 2–3 Gary Wilson
- Xiao Guodong 2–3 Ben Woollaston
- Matthew Selt 3–2 Kyren Wilson
- Tom Ford 3–0 Graeme Dott
- Gary Wilson 1–3 Kyren Wilson
- Matthew Selt 0–3 Graeme Dott
- Ben Woollaston 3–1 Kyren Wilson
- Xiao Guodong 2–3 Matthew Selt
- Tom Ford 2–3 Gary Wilson
- Ben Woollaston 1–3 Matthew Selt
- Graeme Dott 2–3 Kyren Wilson
- Xiao Guodong 1–3 Gary Wilson
- Tom Ford 2–3 Kyren Wilson
- Ben Woollaston 1–3 Gary Wilson
- Tom Ford 3–1 Matthew Selt
- Xiao Guodong 3–1 Graeme Dott

Note

Barry Hawkins and Mark Selby withdrew from the tournament prior to group 3 play.

=== Table ===
Pos	Player	Pld	W	L	FF	FA	FD	
1	Gary Wilson (ENG)	6	5	1	16	11	+5	Qualification to Group 3 play-off
2	Tom Ford (ENG)	6	4	2	16	8	+8	Qualification to Group 3 play-off
3	Kyren Wilson (ENG)	6	3	3	14	14	0	Qualification to Group 3 play-off
4	Matthew Selt (ENG)	6	3	3	12	14	−2	Qualification to Group 3 play-off
5	Graeme Dott (SCO)	6	2	4	11	12	−1	Advances into Group 4
6	Xiao Guodong (CHN)	6	2	4	11	15	−4	Eliminated from the competition
7	Ben Woollaston (ENG)	6	2	4	9	15	−6	Eliminated from the competition

Source: Championship League Snooker by Matchroom Sport

=== Play-offs ===
Semi-finals; Best of 5 frames
Gary Wilson (ENG)	3
Matthew Selt (ENG)	1
Tom Ford (ENG)	2
Kyren Wilson (ENG)	3

Final; Best of 5 frames
Gary Wilson (ENG)	3
Kyren Wilson (ENG)	0

== Group 4 ==
Group 4 was played on 23 and 24 October 2019. Scott Donaldson was the fourth player to qualify for the Winners' Group.

=== Matches ===
- Joe Perry 1–3 Scott Donaldson
- Ali Carter 2–3 Graeme Dott
- Matthew Selt 2–3 Joe Perry
- Tom Ford 2–3 Kyren Wilson
- Scott Donaldson 3–1 Ali Carter
- Graeme Dott 3–2 Tom Ford
- Joe Perry 1–3 Ali Carter
- Kyren Wilson 3–1 Matthew Selt
- Scott Donaldson 3–1 Graeme Dott
- Tom Ford 2–3 Matthew Selt
- Kyren Wilson 3–2 Graeme Dott
- Ali Carter 3–2 Matthew Selt
- Joe Perry 2–3 Kyren Wilson
- Scott Donaldson 2–3 Tom Ford
- Ali Carter 2–3 Kyren Wilson
- Graeme Dott 3–1 Matthew Selt
- Joe Perry 3–0 Tom Ford
- Scott Donaldson 3–0 Matthew Selt
- Ali Carter 1–3 Tom Ford
- Scott Donaldson 3–2 Kyren Wilson
- Joe Perry 2–3 Graeme Dott

=== Table ===
Pos	Player	Pld	W	L	FF	FA	FD	
1	Scott Donaldson (SCO)	6	5	1	17	8	+9	Qualification to Group 4 play-off
2	Kyren Wilson (ENG)	6	5	1	17	12	+5	Qualification to Group 4 play-off
3	Graeme Dott (SCO)	6	4	2	15	13	+2	Qualification to Group 4 play-off
4	Joe Perry (ENG)	6	2	4	12	14	−2	Qualification to Group 4 play-off
5	Tom Ford (ENG)	6	2	4	12	15	−3	Advances into Group 5
6	Ali Carter (ENG)	6	2	4	12	15	−3	Eliminated from the competition
7	Matthew Selt (ENG)	6	1	5	9	17	−8	Eliminated from the competition

Source: Championship League Snooker by Matchroom Sport

=== Play-offs ===
Semi-finals; Best of 5 frames
Scott Donaldson (SCO)	3
Joe Perry (ENG)	2
Kyren Wilson (ENG)	2
Graeme Dott (SCO)	3

Final; Best of 5 frames
Scott Donaldson (SCO)	3
Graeme Dott (SCO)	0

== Group 5 ==
Group 5 was played on 6 and 7 January 2020. Anthony McGill was the fifth player to qualify for the Winners' Group.

=== Matches ===
- Anthony McGill 3–1 David Gilbert
- Mark Williams 3–1 Tom Ford
- Joe Perry 3–1 Anthony McGill
- Kyren Wilson 3–0 Graeme Dott
- David Gilbert 1–3 Mark Williams
- Tom Ford 3–2 Kyren Wilson
- Anthony McGill 0–3 Mark Williams
- Graeme Dott 3–2 Joe Perry
- David Gilbert 3–2 Tom Ford
- Kyren Wilson 3–2 Joe Perry
- Graeme Dott 3–0 Tom Ford
- Mark Williams 3–1 Joe Perry
- Anthony McGill 3–1 Graeme Dott
- David Gilbert 3–0 Kyren Wilson
- Mark Williams 3–2 Graeme Dott
- Tom Ford 2–3 Joe Perry
- Anthony McGill 3–1 Kyren Wilson
- David Gilbert 0–3 Joe Perry
- Mark Williams 3–0 Kyren Wilson
- David Gilbert 3–2 Graeme Dott
- Anthony McGill 1–3 Tom Ford

=== Table ===
Pos	Player	Pld	W	L	FF	FA	FD	
1	Mark Williams (WAL)	6	6	0	18	5	+13	Qualification to Group 5 play-off
2	Joe Perry (ENG)	6	3	3	14	12	+2	Qualification to Group 5 play-off
3	Anthony McGill (SCO)	6	3	3	11	12	−1	Qualification to Group 5 play-off
4	David Gilbert (ENG)	6	3	3	11	13	−2	Qualification to Group 5 play-off
5	Graeme Dott (SCO)	6	2	4	11	14	−3	Advances into Group 6
6	Tom Ford (ENG)	6	2	4	11	15	−4	Eliminated from the competition
7	Kyren Wilson (ENG)	6	2	4	9	14	−5	Eliminated from the competition

Source: Championship League Snooker by Matchroom Sport

=== Play-offs ===
Semi-finals; Best of 5 frames
Mark Williams (WAL)	2
David Gilbert (ENG)	3
Joe Perry (ENG)	2
Anthony McGill (SCO)	3

Final; Best of 5 frames
David Gilbert (ENG)	2
Anthony McGill (SCO)	3

== Group 6 ==
Group 6 was played on 8 and 9 January 2020. Judd Trump was the sixth player to qualify for the Winners' Group.

=== Matches ===
- John Higgins 1–3 Judd Trump
- Mark King 1–3 Graeme Dott
- Mark Williams 2–3 John Higgins
- Joe Perry 1–3 David Gilbert
- Judd Trump 3–1 Mark King
- Graeme Dott 3–1 Joe Perry
- John Higgins 3–2 Mark King
- David Gilbert 3–2 Mark Williams
- Judd Trump 3–1 Graeme Dott
- Joe Perry 2–3 Mark Williams
- David Gilbert 3–2 Graeme Dott
- Mark King 0–3 Mark Williams
- John Higgins 3–1 David Gilbert
- Judd Trump 3–1 Joe Perry
- Mark King 1–3 David Gilbert
- Graeme Dott 3–1 Mark Williams
- John Higgins 1–3 Joe Perry
- Judd Trump 1–3 Mark Williams
- Mark King 1–3 Joe Perry
- Judd Trump 1–3 David Gilbert
- John Higgins 3–2 Graeme Dott

=== Table ===
Pos	Player	Pld	W	L	FF	FA	FD	
1	David Gilbert (ENG)	6	5	1	16	10	+6	Qualification to Group 6 play-off
2	Judd Trump (ENG)	6	4	2	14	10	+4	Qualification to Group 6 play-off
3	John Higgins (SCO)	6	4	2	14	13	+1	Qualification to Group 6 play-off
4	Graeme Dott (SCO)	6	3	3	14	12	+2	Qualification to Group 6 play-off
5	Mark Williams (WAL)	6	3	3	14	12	+2	Advances into Group 7
6	Joe Perry (ENG)	6	2	4	11	14	−3	Eliminated from the competition
7	Mark King (ENG)	6	0	6	6	18	−12	Eliminated from the competition

Source: Championship League Snooker by Matchroom Sport

=== Play-offs ===
Semi-finals; Best of 5 frames
David Gilbert (ENG)	2
Graeme Dott (SCO)	3
Judd Trump (ENG)	3
John Higgins (SCO)	1

Final; Best of 5 frames
Graeme Dott (SCO)	2
Judd Trump (ENG)	3

== Group 7 ==
Group 7 was played on 2 and 3 March 2020. Graeme Dott was the seventh and final player to qualify for the Winners' Group.

=== Matches ===
- Lyu Haotian 1–3 Robert Milkins
- Ricky Walden 0–3 Mark Williams
- David Gilbert 3–1 Lyu Haotian
- John Higgins 2–3 Graeme Dott
- Robert Milkins 1–3 Ricky Walden
- Mark Williams 0–3 John Higgins
- Lyu Haotian 3–0 Ricky Walden
- Graeme Dott 3–1 David Gilbert
- Robert Milkins 1–3 Mark Williams
- John Higgins 3–0 David Gilbert
- Graeme Dott 1–3 Mark Williams
- Ricky Walden 2–3 David Gilbert
- Lyu Haotian 0–3 Graeme Dott
- Robert Milkins 0–3 John Higgins
- Ricky Walden 3–0 Graeme Dott
- Mark Williams 0–3 David Gilbert
- Lyu Haotian 1–3 John Higgins
- Robert Milkins 2–3 David Gilbert
- Ricky Walden 0–3 John Higgins
- Robert Milkins 0–3 Graeme Dott
- Lyu Haotian 3–2 Mark Williams

=== Table ===
Pos	Player	Pld	W	L	FF	FA	FD	
1	John Higgins (SCO)	6	5	1	17	4	+13	Qualification to Group 7 play-off
2	Graeme Dott (SCO)	6	4	2	13	9	+4	Qualification to Group 7 play-off
3	David Gilbert (ENG)	6	4	2	13	11	+2	Qualification to Group 7 play-off
4	Mark Williams (WAL)	6	3	3	11	11	0	Qualification to Group 7 play-off
5	Lyu Haotian (CHN)	6	2	4	9	14	−5	Eliminated from the competition
6	Ricky Walden (ENG)	6	2	4	8	13	−5	Eliminated from the competition
7	Robert Milkins (ENG)	6	1	5	7	16	−9	Eliminated from the competition

Source: Championship League Snooker by Matchroom Sport

=== Play-offs ===
Semi-finals; Best of 5 frames
John Higgins (SCO)	1
Mark Williams (WAL)	3
Graeme Dott (SCO)	3
David Gilbert (ENG)	0

Final; Best of 5 frames
Mark Williams (WAL)	1
Graeme Dott (SCO)	3

== Winners' Group ==
The Winners' Group was played on 4 and 5 March 2020. Scott Donaldson defeated Graeme Dott to win the tournament.

=== Matches ===
- Neil Robertson 3–1 Stuart Bingham
- Gary Wilson 2–3 Scott Donaldson
- Anthony McGill 2–3 Neil Robertson
- Judd Trump 3–2 Graeme Dott
- Stuart Bingham 3–0 Gary Wilson
- Scott Donaldson 1–3 Judd Trump
- Neil Robertson 3–1 Gary Wilson
- Graeme Dott 2–3 Anthony McGill
- Stuart Bingham 0–3 Scott Donaldson
- Judd Trump 3–2 Anthony McGill
- Graeme Dott 3–2 Scott Donaldson
- Gary Wilson 2–3 Anthony McGill
- Neil Robertson 1–3 Graeme Dott
- Stuart Bingham 1–3 Judd Trump
- Gary Wilson 0–3 Graeme Dott
- Scott Donaldson 0–3 Anthony McGill
- Neil Robertson 0–3 Judd Trump
- Stuart Bingham 3–1 Anthony McGill
- Gary Wilson 1–3 Judd Trump
- Stuart Bingham 0–3 Graeme Dott
- Neil Robertson 1–3 Scott Donaldson

=== Table ===
Pos	Player	Pld	W	L	FF	FA	FD	
1	Judd Trump (ENG)	6	6	0	18	7	+11	Qualification to Winners' Group play-off
2	Graeme Dott (SCO)	6	4	2	16	9	+7	Qualification to Winners' Group play-off
3	Anthony McGill (SCO)	6	3	3	14	13	+1	Qualification to Winners' Group play-off
4	Scott Donaldson (SCO)	6	3	3	12	12	0	Qualification to Winners' Group play-off
5	Neil Robertson (AUS)	6	3	3	11	13	−2	Eliminated from the competition
6	Stuart Bingham (ENG)	6	2	4	8	13	−5	Eliminated from the competition
7	Gary Wilson (ENG)	6	0	6	6	18	−12	Eliminated from the competition

Source: Championship League Snooker by Matchroom Sport

=== Play-offs ===
Semi-finals; Best of 5 frames
Judd Trump (ENG)	1
Scott Donaldson (SCO)	3
Graeme Dott (SCO)	3
Anthony McGill (SCO)	2

Final; Best of 5 frames
Scott Donaldson (SCO)	3
Graeme Dott (SCO)	0

== Century breaks ==
A total of 104 century breaks were made during the event.

- **145** (6), **139** (W), 132, 128, 127, 127, 122, 120, 117, 114, 107, 100 – Judd Trump
- **143** (4), 125, 121, 110, 109, 107, 106, 105, 105, 101, 100, 100, 100 – Kyren Wilson
- 140, 132, 126, 118, 106, 105, 103, 100 – Graeme Dott
- **139** (5), 126, 115, 109, 106 – Tom Ford
- 138, 128, 121, 114, 111 – Joe Perry
- 138, 117, 105, 103, 101 – David Gilbert
- 137, 135, 116, 109, 107, 105 – Mark Williams
- 137, 114, 114, 108 – Anthony McGill
- **134** (2), 133, **131** (1), 130, 117 – Mark Selby
- **134** (3), 132, 132, 125, 119, 108, 105, 103, 101, 100 – Gary Wilson
- 134, 130, 118, 108, 101 – Stuart Bingham
- **134** (3), 127, 113, 109 – Xiao Guodong
- 133, **130** (7), 121, 109, 107, 101 – John Higgins
- 132 – Ben Woollaston
- 129, 116, 102 – Barry Hawkins
- 126, 101 – Ryan Day
- 125 – Lyu Haotian
- 118, 111 – Neil Robertson
- 111 – Scott Donaldson
- 108, 101 – Jack Lisowski
- 107, 101, 101 – Jimmy Robertson
- 103 – Matthew Selt

Bold: highest break in the indicated group.

== Winnings ==
No.	Player	1	2	3	4	5	6	7	W	TOTAL
1	Graeme Dott (SCO) (21)			1,100	4,400	1,100	4,900	6,100	9,100	26,700
2	Scott Donaldson (SCO) (29)				6,500				14,200	20,700
3	Judd Trump (ENG) (1)						**6,700**		**7,900**	14,600
4	Anthony McGill (SCO) (26)					5,900			6,400	12,300
5	Kyren Wilson (ENG) (9)		3,000	4,300	**3,800**	900				12,000
6	Gary Wilson (ENG) (19)		2,300	**6,650**					1,200	10,150
7	David Gilbert (ENG) (12)					4,600	3,200	2,300		10,100
8	Mark Williams (WAL) (3)					3,400	1,400	4,300		9,100
9	Mark Selby (ENG) (5)	**3,300**	**5,200**							8,500
10	Neil Robertson (AUS) (4)	6,100							2,200	8,300
11	Stuart Bingham (ENG) (13)		6,100						1,600	7,700
12	Joe Perry (ENG) (16)				2,800	3,000	1,100			6,900
13	John Higgins (SCO) (6)						2,700	**3,500**		6,200
14	Tom Ford (ENG) (25)			3,200	1,200	**1,600**				6,000
15	Ryan Day (WAL) (20)	4,800	700							5,500
16	Barry Hawkins (ENG) (10)	2,800	1,200							4,000
17	Matthew Selt (ENG) (28)			2,500	900					3,400
18	Jack Lisowski (ENG) (11)	1,200	600							1,800
19	Xiao Guodong (CHN) (23)			**1,350**						1,350
20	Ali Carter (ENG) (17)				1,200					1,200
21	Jimmy Robertson (ENG) (22)	1,000								1,000
=	Luca Brecel (BEL) (27)	1,000								1,000
23	Ben Woollaston (ENG) (40)			900						900
=	Lyu Haotian (CHN) (24)							900		900
25	Ricky Walden (ENG) (30)							800		800
26	Robert Milkins (ENG) (39)							700		700
27	Mark King (ENG) (32)						600			600
	Total prize money	20,200	19,100	20,000	20,800	20,500	20,600	18,600	42,600	182,400

Green: Won the group. Bold: Highest break in the group. All prize money in GBP.
Parenthesis: Ranking prior to tournament start, 7 October 2019.
